= Donny Morelock =

American racing driver

- Born: August 29, 1962 (age 64); Clearwater, Florida, U.S.

NASCAR FedEx Freight Truck Series career
- 7 races run over 3 years
- Best finish: 48th (2000)
- First race: 2000 Sears 200 (Evergreen)
- Last race: 2002 Kroger 225 (Kentucky)
Wins	Top tens	Poles
0	0	0

ARCA Menards Series career
- 25 races run over 1 year
- Best finish: 8th (2001)
- First race: 2001 Discount Auto Parts 200 (Daytona)
- Last race: 2001 Pork The Other White Meat 400 (Atlanta)
Wins	Top tens	Poles
0	1	0
- Statistics up to date as of November 27, 2024.

Donny Morelock (born August 29, 1962) is an American former professional stock car racing driver who has competed in the NASCAR Craftsman Truck Series and the ARCA Re/Max Series.

Morelock has also previously competed in the NASCAR Southeast Series.

== Motorsports results ==
=== NASCAR ===
(key) (Bold - Pole position awarded by qualifying time. Italics - Pole position earned by points standings or practice time. * – Most laps led.)

==== Craftsman Truck Series ====
NASCAR Craftsman Truck Series results
Year	Team	No.	Make	1	2	3	4	5	6	7	8	9	10	11	12	13	14	15	16	17	18	19	20	21	22	23	24	NCTC	Pts	Ref
2000	Bobby Hamilton Racing	4	Dodge	DAY	HOM	PHO	MMR	MAR	PIR	GTY	MEM	PPR	EVG; 32	TEX	KEN	GLN; DNQ	MLW; 27	NHA	NZH; 21	MCH; 19	IRP; DNQ	NSV	CIC	RCH	DOV	TEX	CAL	48th	459	
2001	Troxell Racing	93	Chevy	DAY	HOM	MMR	MAR	GTY	DAR	PPR	DOV	TEX	MEM	MLW	KAN	KEN; 32	NHA	IRP										75th	177	
2001	Green Light Racing	07	Chevy																NSH; DNQ	CIC	NZH	RCH	SBO	TEX				75th	177	
2001	Richardson Motorsports	0	Chevy																						LVS; DNQ	PHO	CAL	75th	177	
2002	Ware Racing Enterprises	51	Dodge	DAY	DAR	MAR	GTY	PPR	DOV	TEX	MEM	MLW	KAN; 33	KEN; 35	NHA	MCH	IRP	NSH	RCH	TEX	SBO	LVS	CAL	PHO	HOM			78th	122	

=== ARCA Re/Max Series ===
(key) (Bold – Pole position awarded by qualifying time. Italics – Pole position earned by points standings or practice time. * – Most laps led. ** – All laps led.)

ARCA Re/Max Series results
Year	Team	No.	Make	1	2	3	4	5	6	7	8	9	10	11	12	13	14	15	16	17	18	19	20	21	22	23	24	25	ARMSC	Pts	Ref
2001	James Hylton Motorsports	48	Ford	DAY; 22	NSH; 22	WIN; 27	SLM; 14	GTY; 22	KEN; 11	CLT; 32	KAN; 13	MCH; 20	POC; 16	MEM; 27	GLN; 11	KEN; 25	MCH; 15	POC; 16		ISF; 9	CHI; 28	DSF; 23	SLM; 12	TOL; 13	BLN; 20	CLT; 33	TAL; 34		8th	4495	
2001	James Hylton Motorsports	48	Dodge																NSH; 13										8th	4495	
2001	Randy Fenley	15	Ford																									ATL; 28	8th	4495	
