= Michael Dokken =

American stock car racing driver

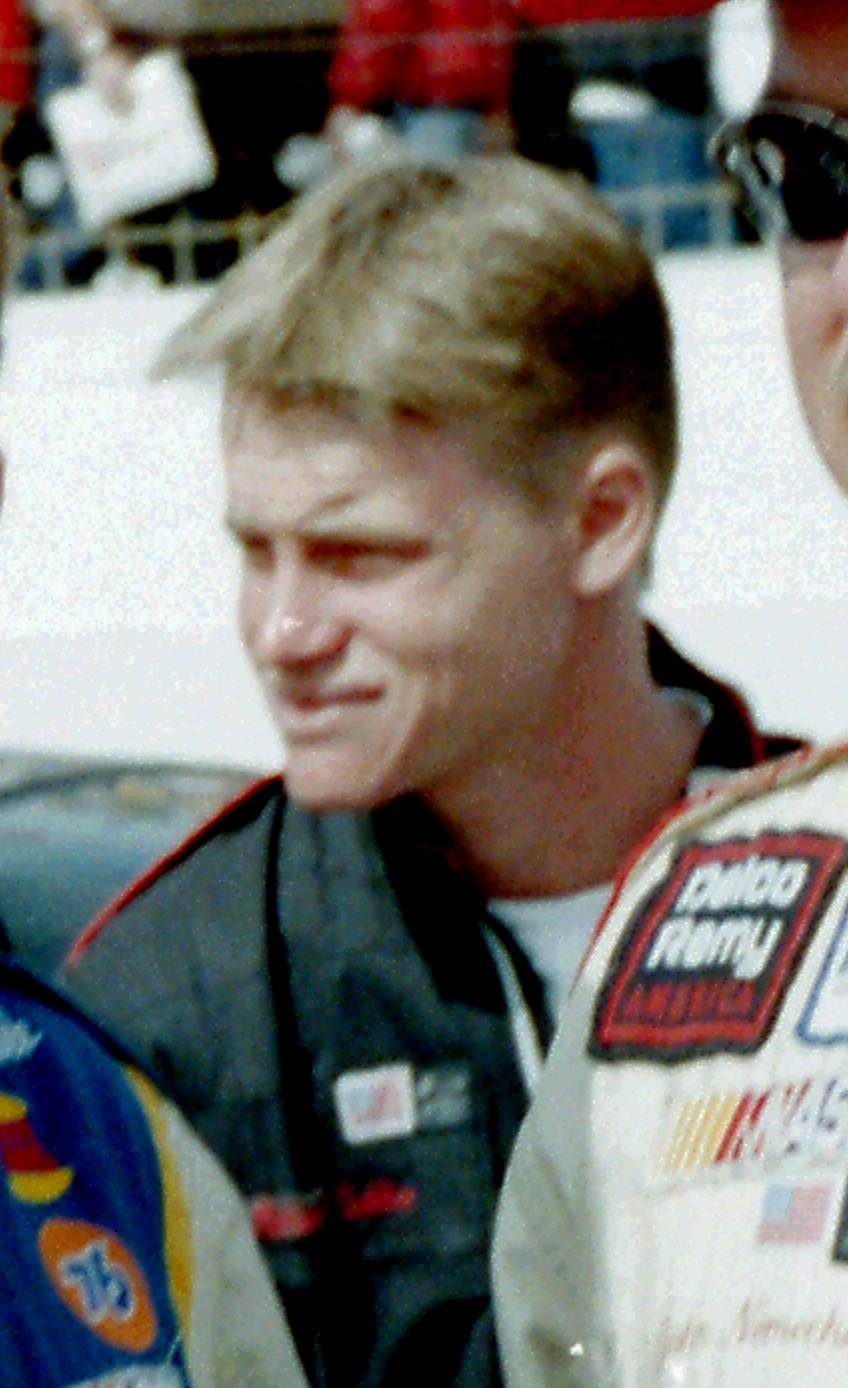
- Dokken in 1996
- Born: June 4, 1971 (age 55); Clearwater, Florida, U.S.

NASCAR O'Reilly Auto Parts Series career
- 3 races run over 1 year
- Best finish: 100th (2001)
- First race: 2001 NAPA Autocare 250 (Pikes Peak)
- Last race: 2001 Little Trees 300 (Charlotte)
Wins	Top tens	Poles
0	0	0

NASCAR FedEx Freight Truck Series career
- 74 races run over 8 years
- Best finish: 20th (1996)
- First race: 1995 Western Auto 200 (I-70)
- Last race: 2003 Ram Tough 200 (Gateway)
Wins	Top tens	Poles
0	6	1

Michael Dokken (born June 4, 1971) is an American former stock car racing driver and a former competitor in the NASCAR Craftsman Truck Series.

== Career ==
Dokken first achieved notice in 1990, when he won the first race he ever competed in at New Smyrna Speedway. He made his NASCAR Truck Series debut in 1995 at I-70, driving his own No. 64 Chevrolet he started the race in 25th and only completed 120 laps before his engine expired and finished 21st. Dokken made six other starts in 1995, his best finish being 15th at Flemington. His best start was third at Phoenix.

In 1996, Dokken competed in 20 of the 24 races. He started off by running 13th in points after Tucson, where he scored his first career top-ten of ninth, before missing several races. He earned a seventh in one of his last races for his team at Nashville Speedway USA, and then split the last part of the schedule with MB Motorsports, and Kurt Roehrig.

In 1997, Dokken signed to drive Roehrig's No. 18 Dana Holding Corporation Dodge Ram for the full season. At Tucson, Dokken won his first career pole, becoming the series' youngest pole winner until Kurt Busch in 2000, and led 95 of 200 laps, before late race problems relegated Dokken to 13th. Later on, Dokken would earn a third at Evergreen Speedway and fifth at Nazareth. However, mechanical problems plagued the team, falling out of multiple races, and the team only ran one of the last thirteen races due to limited funding.

Dokken skipped 1998, but returned for five races in 1999, splitting races between three teams. He DNF'd in every start however, with his best finish being a 27th place showing at Las Vegas.

Dokken made four more starts in 2000. where had an eighth-place run with Ware Racing Enterprises at NHIS. Dokken also finished in the top-21 in all his starts and finished all of them.

Dokken made starts in 2001, splitting time between Brevak Racing and Ware Racing. His best run was with Ware at Nazareth: an 11th-place finish. He closed 2001 with three straight top-20 finishes. Dokken also ran three Busch Series races in 2001, running for Armando Fitz. He made his debut at Pikes Peak, where he started 39th and finished 41st. He finished 42nd in his other two starts, but earned his best career start of 36th at Charlotte.

Dokken only made eight races in 2002, running with Ware, Troxell Racing, Richardson Racing, and Team Racing. He ran three races with Ware, where he had a 22nd and then a pair of 19ths. After his departure from Ware, his best run was a 32nd.

Dokken's last year was 2003, competing in six races, with Troxell, RDS Motorsports, and Team Racing. His best run was a 14th at Memphis, running the RDS truck. Dokken's final race at the series was at Gateway International Raceway in July of that year; he was injured in a practice crash the following week at Michigan International Speedway; he suffered a minor fracture to the base of the skull, and has not competed in NASCAR competition since.

== Post-NASCAR ==
Dokken ran a limited schedule in the Pro Cup Series in 2004, before retiring from driving and becoming a crew chief in the Craftsman Truck Series. Today, he works with his brother Chad to help run Chad Dokken Racing (CDR), a karting team based out of Mooresville, North Carolina.

== Motorsports career results ==
=== NASCAR ===
(key) (Bold – Pole position awarded by qualifying time. Italics – Pole position earned by points standings or practice time. * – Most laps led.)

==== Busch Series ====
NASCAR Busch Series results
Year	Team	No.	Make	1	2	3	4	5	6	7	8	9	10	11	12	13	14	15	16	17	18	19	20	21	22	23	24	25	26	27	28	29	30	31	32	33	34	NBSC	Pts	Ref
2001	HighLine Performance Group	8	Chevy	DAY	CAR	LVS	ATL	DAR	BRI	TEX	NSH	TAL	CAL	RCH	NHA	NZH	CLT	DOV	KEN	MLW	GLN	CHI	GTY	PPR; 41	IRP	MCH	BRI	DAR; 42	RCH	DOV	KAN	CLT; 42	MEM	PHO	CAR	HOM; DNQ		100th	114	
2002	MacDonald Motorsports	55	Chevy	DAY	CAR	LVS	DAR	BRI	TEX	NSH	TAL	CAL	RCH	NHA	NZH	CLT	DOV	NSH	KEN	MLW	DAY	CHI	GTY	PPR	IRP	MCH	BRI	DAR	RCH	DOV	KAN	CLT	MEM; DNQ	ATL	CAR	PHO	HOM	NA	-	
2003	MacDonald Motorsports	72	Chevy	DAY	CAR; DNQ	LVS	DAR	BRI	TEX	TAL	NSH	CAL	RCH	GTY	NZH	CLT	DOV	NSH	KEN	MLW	DAY	CHI	NHA	PPR	IRP	MCH	BRI	DAR	RCH	DOV	KAN	CLT	MEM	ATL	PHO	CAR	HOM	NA	-	

==== Craftsman Truck Series ====
NASCAR Craftsman Truck Series results
Year	Team	No.	Make	1	2	3	4	5	6	7	8	9	10	11	12	13	14	15	16	17	18	19	20	21	22	23	24	25	26	27	NCTC	Pts	Ref
1995	Dokken Racing	64	Chevy	PHO	TUS	SGS	MMR	POR	EVG	I70; 21	LVL	BRI	MLW	CNS	HPT; 18	IRP; 26	FLM; 15	RCH; DNQ	MAR; 21	NWS; 17	SON	MMR; 33	PHO; DNQ								31st	753	
1996	Dokken Racing	64	Chevy	HOM; 12	PHO; 10	POR; 17	EVG; 29	TUS; 9	CNS; 29	HPT; 32	BRI; 26	NZH; 23	MLW; 18	LVL; 20	I70; 25	IRP			NSV; 7	RCH; 31	NHA		NWS; 11	SON		PHO; 24	LVS; 35				20th	1977	
1996	MB Motorsports	26	Ford														FLM; 30	GLN													20th	1977	
1996	Roehrig Motorsports	18	Chevy																			MAR; 15									20th	1977	
1996	Bunce Engineering	9	Chevy																						MMR; 27						20th	1977	
1997	Roehrig Motorsports	18	Chevy	WDW; 35																											28th	1331	
1997	Roehrig Motorsports	18	Dodge		**TUS**; 13*	HOM; 35	PHO; 28	POR; 29	EVG; 3	I70; 26	NHA; 31	TEX; 24	BRI; 23	NZH; 5	MLW; 32	LVL; 17	CNS	HPT	IRP	FLM; 22	NSV	GLN	RCH	MAR	SON	MMR	CAL	PHO	LVS		28th	1331	
1998	Dokken Racing	64	Chevy	WDW; DNQ	HOM; DNQ	PHO	POR	EVG	I70	GLN	TEX	BRI	MLW	NZH	CAL	PPR	IRP	NHA	FLM	NSV	HPT	LVL	RCH	MEM	GTY	MAR	SON	MMR	PHO	LVS	NA	-	
1999	Dokken Racing	64	Chevy	HOM; 31	PHO	EVG	MMR	MAR; 32	MEM; DNQ	PPR	I70	BRI	TEX	PIR	GLN	MLW															44th	405	
1999	Black Tip Racing	69	Chevy														NSV; 32	NZH	MCH	NHA	IRP; 31	GTY	HPT	RCH							44th	405	
1999	Conely Racing	7	Chevy																						LVS; 27	LVL	TEX	CAL			44th	405	
2000	Black Tip Racing	69	Chevy	DAY	HOM; 21	PHO	MMR	MAR	PIR	GTY	MEM	PPR	EVG	TEX																	43rd	532	
2000	Conely Racing	17	Chevy												KEN; DNQ	GLN															43rd	532	
2000	Ware Racing Enterprises	51	Chevy														MLW; 16	NHA; 8	NZH; 15	MCH	IRP	NSV	CIC	RCH	DOV	TEX	CAL				43rd	532	
2001	Brevak Racing	31	Ford	DAY; 33	HOM; 22	MMR	MAR; 30	GTY; 32	DAR	PPR	DOV	TEX	MEM	MLW	KAN																34th	884	
2001	Ware Racing Enterprises	71	Chevy													KEN; DNQ			NSH; 31												34th	884	
2001	Ware Racing Enterprises	81	Chevy														NHA; 26	IRP		CIC; 27	NZH; 11	RCH	SBO; 16	TEX							34th	884	
2001	Team 23 Racing	23	Chevy																						LVS; DNQ	PHO					34th	884	
2001	Ware Racing Enterprises	91	Chevy																								CAL; 17				34th	884	
2002	Ware Racing Enterprises	51	Dodge	DAY; DNQ	DAR; 22	MAR; 19	GTY; 19	PPR	DOV	TEX	MEM																				36th	605	
2002	Troxell Racing	93	Chevy									MLW; 34	KAN			MCH; 36	IRP	NSH	RCH	TEX; 32	SBO	LVS									36th	605	
2002	Team Racing	25	Chevy											KEN; 36	NHA																36th	605	
2002	Richardson Motorsports	0	Chevy																				CAL; 35	PHO	HOM						36th	605	
2003	Troxell Racing	93	Chevy	DAY; 31	DAR	MMR	MAR	CLT; DNQ	DOV; 27	TEX; 34																					56th	410	
2003	MLB Motorsports	66	Dodge								MEM; 14	MLW; QL^{†}																			56th	410	
2003	MLB Motorsports	36	Dodge										KAN; 29	KEN																	56th	410	
2003	Team Racing	25	Chevy												GTW; 34	MCH	IRP	NSH	BRI	RCH	NHA	CAL	LVS	SBO	TEX	MAR	PHO	HOM			56th	410	
^{†} - Qualified but replaced by Trevor Boys

=== ARCA Hooters SuperCar Series ===
(key) (Bold – Pole position awarded by qualifying time. Italics – Pole position earned by points standings or practice time. * – Most laps led.)

ARCA Hooters SuperCar Series results
Year	Team	No.	Make	1	2	3	4	5	6	7	8	9	10	11	12	13	14	15	16	17	18	19	20	21	AHSC	Pts	Ref
1994	Dokken Racing	64	Chevy	DAY; 33	TAL; 18	FIF	LVL	KIL	TOL	FRS	MCH	DMS	POC	POC; 34	KIL	FRS	INF	I70	ISF	DSF	TOL	SLM	WIN	ATL; 28	47th	615	
1995	Dokken Racing	64	Olds	DAY; 33	ATL	TAL	FIF	KIL	FRS	MCH	I80	MCS	FRS	POC	POC	KIL	FRS	SBS	LVL	ISF	DSF	SLM	WIN	ATL	110th	-	
