= Mark Petty =

American racing driver

- Born: October 16, 1969 (age 57); Randleman, North Carolina, U.S.

NASCAR FedEx Freight Truck Series career
- 9 races run over 2 years
- Best finish: 34th (2000)
- First race: 2000 Power Stroke 200 (IRP)
- Last race: 2001 Florida Dodge Dealers 400K (Homestead-Miami)
Wins	Top tens	Poles
0	1	0

Mark Petty (born October 16, 1969) is an American former stock car racing driver from Randleman, North Carolina. He is the nephew of Richard Petty. He began competing in NASCAR Craftsman Truck Series in 2000 events in his career, earning one top-ten. He worked as a chassis specialist for Red Horse Racing.

== Motorsports results ==
=== NASCAR ===
(key) (Bold – Pole position awarded by qualifying time. Italics – Pole position earned by points standings or practice time. * – Most laps led.)

==== Craftsman Truck Series ====
NASCAR Craftsman Truck Series results
Year	Team	No.	Make	1	2	3	4	5	6	7	8	9	10	11	12	13	14	15	16	17	18	19	20	21	22	23	24	NCTC	Pts	Ref
2000	Petty Enterprises	44	Dodge	DAY	HOM	PHO	MMR	MAR	PIR	GTY	MEM	PPR	EVG	TEX	KEN	GLN	MLW	NHA	NZH	MCH	IRP; 22	NSV; 26	CIC; 18	RCH; 33	DOV; 18	TEX; 10	CAL; 14	34th	719	
2001	Tex Racing	10	Dodge	DAY; 32	HOM; 32	MMR	MAR	GTY	DAR	PPR	DOV	TEX	MEM	MLW	KAN	KEN	NHA	IRP	NSH	CIC	NZH	RCH	SBO	TEX	LVS	PHO	CAL	88th	134	
