= B. A. Wilson =

American racing driver

- Born: January 6, 1971 (age 55); Bonham, Texas
- Achievements: 1996 ValleyStar Credit Union 300 winner

NASCAR FedEx Freight Truck Series career
- 39 races run over 4 years
- Best finish: 21st (2000)
- First race: 1997 Virginia Is For Lovers 200 (Richmond)
- Last race: 2000 Motorola 200 (Fontana)
Wins	Top tens	Poles
0	2	0

B. A. Wilson (born January 6, 1971) is an American former stock car racing driver. He competed in the Craftsman Truck Series from 1997–2000.

== 1997 ==
Wilson made his debut in 1997, when he drove a personally-owned vehicle into the show at Richmond with a solid qualifying effort of 17th. He drove a smart race and came home with a 14th-place finish. Wilson qualified 17th in his other 1997 race, which came at Martinsville. However, transmission troubles sidelined him this time to 31st position.

== 1998 ==
Wilson ran eight more races in 1998, continuing to run his family-owned No. 85 Llumar Chevy. Wilson did a respectable job, putting the truck in the top-20 in half of his outings. His best run would end up being a 14th place at Richmond. Wilson also qualified well, getting a pair of ninth place starting positions, at Martinsville and Nashville. Bad news for Wilson was that he also did not finish half of the races and he would have to work on that to improve his 36th place in the point rankings.

== 1999 ==
Wilson did improve in 1999, finishing 32nd in points after another eight-race schedule. Wilson, though, did not really have his results improve on paper as he only finished three races. However, he did set his career best finish to that point (12th at Las Vegas and career best qualifying effort (seventh at Martinsville). In the season finale, at California, Wilson switched to Sonntag Racing. He finished 28th.

== 2000 ==
Wilson stayed with Sonntag for the full 2000 season, he was involved in the big one at Daytona in which Geoff Bodine had the horrific crash as well. competing in twenty-one of twenty-four races and finishing 21st in points. Wilson got his first career top-ten at Texas, where he finished ninth. He later matched that effort at Chicago Motor Speedway. Other highlights included a career best qualifying effort at Pikes Peak (fifth), first laps led (at Mesa Marin – 14) and then later at Chicago Motor (seven laps). However, it was not enough to keep Wilson's job and he was released following the season finale. He has not raced in NASCAR since.

== Motorsports career results ==
=== NASCAR ===
(key) (Bold – Pole position awarded by qualifying time. Italics – Pole position earned by points standings or practice time. * – Most laps led.)

==== Craftsman Truck Series ====
NASCAR Craftsman Truck Series results
Year	Team	No.	Make	1	2	3	4	5	6	7	8	9	10	11	12	13	14	15	16	17	18	19	20	21	22	23	24	25	26	27	NCTC	Pts	Ref
1997	Viper Motorsports	85	Ford	WDW	TUS	HOM	PHO	POR	EVG	I70	NHA	TEX	BRI	NZH	MLW	LVL	CNS	HPT	IRP	FLM	NSV	GLN	RCH; 14	MAR; 31	SON	MMR	CAL	PHO	LVS		81st	191	
1998	Viper Motorsports	85	Ford	WDW	HOM; DNQ	PHO	POR	EVG	I70	GLN	TEX; 34	BRI	MLW; DNQ	NZH	CAL	PPR	IRP; 19	NHA	FLM	NSV; 30	HPT	LVL	RCH; 14	MEM; 18	GTY	MAR; 26	SON				36th	820	
1998	Viper Motorsports	65	Ford																									MMR; 28	PHO	LVS; 19	36th	820	
1999	Viper Motorsports	85	Ford	HOM	PHO	EVG	MMR; 33	MAR; 29	MEM; 18	PPR	I70	BRI	TEX; 27	PIR	GLN	MLW	NSV; DNQ	NZH	MCH	NHA	IRP; 33	GTY	HPT	RCH; DNQ	LVS; 12	LVL	TEX; 24				32nd	796	
1999	Sonntag Racing	73	Chevy																									CAL; 28			32nd	796	
2000	Sonntag Racing	73	Chevy	DAY; 27	HOM; 19	PHO; 19	MMR; 18	MAR; 16	PIR	GTY; 13	MEM; 14	PPR; 14	EVG; 21	TEX; 9	KEN; 14	GLN; 33	MLW; 33	NHA	NZH	MCH; 32	IRP; 14	NSV; 27	CIC; 9	RCH; 27	DOV; 34	TEX; 27					21st	2047	
2000	Sonntag Racing	73	Dodge																								CAL; 22				21st	2047	

=== ARCA Hooters SuperCar Series ===
(key) (Bold – Pole position awarded by qualifying time. Italics – Pole position earned by points standings or practice time. * – Most laps led.)

ARCA Hooters SuperCar Series results
Year	Team	No.	Make	1	2	3	4	5	6	7	8	9	10	11	12	13	14	15	16	17	18	19	AHSS	Pts	Ref
1993	Wilson Motor Co.	12	Pontiac	DAY	FIF	TWS; 19	TAL	KIL	CMS	FRS	TOL	POC	MCH; 10	FRS	POC	KIL	ISF	DSF	TOL	SLM	WIN	ATL	97th	-	
