= Kenny Martin =

American racing driver

- Born: August 20, 1960 (age 66); Broadview Heights, Ohio, U.S.

NASCAR FedEx Freight Truck Series career
- 7 races run over 1 year
- Best finish: 37th (2000)
- First race: 2000 Daytona 250 (Daytona)
- Last race: 2000 Quaker State 200 (Memphis)
Wins	Top tens	Poles
0	2	0

Kenny Martin (born August 20, 1960 in Broadview Heights, Ohio) is an American racing driver who drove ARCA and NASCAR. He is better known by finishing fifth in his debut in the Craftsman Truck Series at the inaugural Daytona 250 which was filled by a number of trucks out of the race, driving the No. 98 truck. He only made six more starts since, and would finish ninth at Memphis Motorsports Park. That was Martin's last start in NASCAR until trying to attempt to make the race at Dover, where he did not make the field. Since then, he has not made a NASCAR start or ARCA as well. He is not related to NASCAR Sprint Cup driver Mark Martin.

== Motorsports career results ==
=== NASCAR ===
(key) (Bold – Pole position awarded by qualifying time. Italics – Pole position earned by points standings or practice time. * – Most laps led.)

==== Craftsman Truck Series ====
NASCAR Craftsman Truck Series results
Year	Team	No.	Make	1	2	3	4	5	6	7	8	9	10	11	12	13	14	15	16	17	18	19	20	21	22	23	24	NCTC	Pts	Ref
2000	Liberty Racing	98	Ford	DAY; 5	HOM; 29	PHO; 32	MMR; 33	MAR; 31	PIR	GTY; 22	MEM; 9	PPR	EVG	TEX	KEN	GLN	MLW	NHA	NZH	MCH	IRP	NSV	CIC	RCH	DOV; DNQ	TEX	CAL	37th	652	

==== Goody's Dash Series ====
NASCAR Goody's Dash Series results
Year	Team	No.	Make	1	2	3	4	5	6	7	8	9	10	11	12	13	14	15	16	17	18	19	20	NGDS	Pts	Ref
1998	N/A	54	Pontiac	DAY	HCY	CAR	CLT; DNQ	TRI	LAN	BRI	SUM	GRE	ROU	SNM	MYB	CON	HCY	LAN	STA	LOU	VOL	USA	HOM	102nd	1	

=== ARCA Bondo/Mar-Hyde Series ===
(key) (Bold – Pole position awarded by qualifying time. Italics – Pole position earned by points standings or practice time. * – Most laps led.)

ARCA Bondo/Mar-Hyde Series results
Year	Team	No.	Make	1	2	3	4	5	6	7	8	9	10	11	12	13	14	15	16	17	18	19	20	21	22	ABMSC	Pts	Ref
1997	Bob Schacht Motorsports	50	Ford	DAY; 34	ATL; 11	SLM													GTW; 7	SLM	WIN	CLT; 24	TAL; 29	ISF	ATL; 22	23rd	-	
1997	Bob Schacht Motorsports	75	Ford				CLT; 9	CLT; 10	POC	MCH	SBS	TOL	KIL	FRS	MIN	POC; 8	MCH; 5	DSF								23rd	-	
1998	Bob Schacht Motorsports	50	Ford	DAY; 39	ATL; 13	SLM	CLT; 12	MEM	MCH	POC	SBS	TOL	PPR	POC	KIL	FRS	ISF									NA	0	
1998	Bob Schacht Motorsports	75	Ford															ATL; 6	DSF	SLM	TEX	WIN	CLT	TAL; 14	ATL	NA	0	
1999		30	Ford	DAY	ATL	SLM	AND	CLT	MCH	POC	TOL	SBS	BLN	POC	KIL	FRS	FLM	ISF	WIN	DSF	SLM	CLT; 13	TAL	ATL; 23		75th	285	
