= John Young (racing driver) =

American racing driver (born 1968)

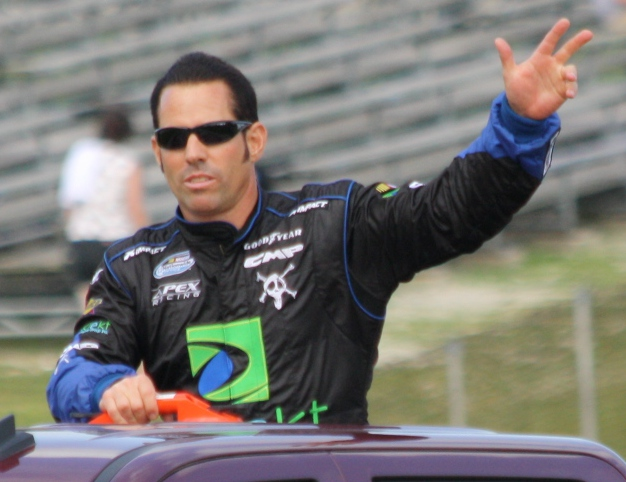
- Young at Road America in 2013
- Born: October 19, 1968 (age 58); Woodside, California, U.S.

NASCAR O'Reilly Auto Parts Series career
- 5 races run over 4 years
- Best finish: 73rd (2012)
- First race: 2007 Telcel-Motorola Mexico 200 (Mexico City)
- Last race: 2013 Johnsonville Sausage 200 (Road America)
| Wins | Top tens | Poles |
|---|---|---|
| 0 | 0 | 0 |

NASCAR FedEx Freight Truck Series career
- 12 races run over 2 years
- Best finish: 33rd (2000)
- First race: 1999 NAPA 300K (Pikes Peak)
- Last race: 2000 Pronto Auto Parts 400K (Texas)
| Wins | Top tens | Poles |
|---|---|---|
| 0 | 1 | 0 |
- Statistics up to date as of January 14, 2025.

John Young (born October 19, 1968) is an American professional auto racing driver who has competed in the NASCAR Nationwide Series and the NASCAR Craftsman Truck Series.

Young has also competed in the NASCAR Winston West Series, the NASCAR Southwest Series, the GT World Challenge America, the IMSA GT Championship, and the Trans Am Championship.

== Motorsports results ==
=== NASCAR ===
(key) (Bold - Pole position awarded by qualifying time. Italics - Pole position earned by points standings or practice time. * – Most laps led.)

==== Nationwide Series ====
NASCAR Nationwide Series results
| Year | Team | No. | Make | 1 | 2 | 3 | 4 | 5 | 6 | 7 | 8 | 9 | 10 | 11 | 12 | 13 | 14 | 15 | 16 | 17 | 18 | 19 | 20 | 21 | 22 | 23 | 24 | 25 | 26 | 27 | 28 | 29 | 30 | 31 | 32 | 33 | 34 | 35 | NNSC | Pts | Ref |
|---|---|---|---|---|---|---|---|---|---|---|---|---|---|---|---|---|---|---|---|---|---|---|---|---|---|---|---|---|---|---|---|---|---|---|---|---|---|---|---|---|---|
| 2007 | John Young Racing | 46 | Ford | DAY | CAL | MXC; 39 | LVS | ATL | BRI | NSH | TEX | PHO | TAL | RCH | DAR | CLT | DOV | NSH | KEN | MLW | NHA | DAY | CHI | GTY | IRP | CGV | GLN | MCH | BRI | CAL | RCH | DOV | KAN | CLT | MEM | TEX | PHO | HOM | 148th | 46 | |
| 2008 | Baker Curb Racing | 37 | Ford | DAY | CAL | LVS | ATL | BRI | NSH | TEX | PHO; 37 | MXC | TAL | RCH | DAR | CLT | DOV | NSH | KEN | MLW | NHA | DAY | CHI | GTY | IRP | CGV | GLN | MCH | BRI | CAL | RCH | DOV | KAN | CLT | MEM | TEX | PHO | HOM | 139th | 52 | |
| 2012 | Young Racing | 26 | Dodge | DAY | PHO | LVS | BRI | CAL | TEX | RCH | TAL | DAR | IOW | CLT | DOV | MCH | ROA; 28 | KEN | DAY | NHA | CHI | IND | IOW | GLN; DNQ | CGV; 31 | BRI | ATL | RCH | CHI | KEN | DOV | CLT | KAN | TEX | PHO | HOM | | | 73rd | 29 | |
| 2013 | Young Racing | 26 | Dodge | DAY | PHO | LVS | BRI | CAL | TEX | RCH | TAL | DAR | CLT | DOV | IOW | MCH | ROA; 28 | KEN | DAY | NHA | CHI | IND | IOW | GLN | MOH | BRI | ATL | RCH | CHI | KEN | DOV | KAN | CLT | TEX | PHO | HOM | | | 76th | 16 | |

==== Craftsman Truck Series ====
NASCAR Craftsman Truck Series results
| Year | Team | No. | Make | 1 | 2 | 3 | 4 | 5 | 6 | 7 | 8 | 9 | 10 | 11 | 12 | 13 | 14 | 15 | 16 | 17 | 18 | 19 | 20 | 21 | 22 | 23 | 24 | 25 | NCTC | Pts | Ref |
|---|---|---|---|---|---|---|---|---|---|---|---|---|---|---|---|---|---|---|---|---|---|---|---|---|---|---|---|---|---|---|---|
| 1999 | John Young Racing | 72 | Ford | HOM | PHO | EVG | MMR | MAR | MEM | PPR; 23 | I70 | BRI | TEX | PIR; 29 | GLN | MLW | NSV | NZH | MCH | NHA | IRP | GTY | HPT; 33 | RCH | LVS; 31 | LVL | TEX | CAL | 52nd | 304 | |
| 2000 | Brevak Racing | 31 | Ford | DAY; 21 | HOM; 23 | PHO | MMR | MAR; 24 | PIR; 10 | GTY; 28 | MEM; 24 | PPR | EVG; 29 | TEX; 36 | KEN | GLN | MLW | NHA | NZH | MCH | IRP | NSV | CIC | RCH | DOV | TEX | CAL | | 33rd | 720 | |

==== Winston West Series ====
NASCAR Winston West Series results
| Year | Team | No. | Make | 1 | 2 | 3 | 4 | 5 | 6 | 7 | 8 | 9 | 10 | 11 | 12 | 13 | 14 | NWWSC | Pts | Ref |
|---|---|---|---|---|---|---|---|---|---|---|---|---|---|---|---|---|---|---|---|---|
| 1999 | John Young | 76 | Ford | TUS | LVS | PHO | CAL | PPR | MMR; 11 | IRW | EVG | POR | IRW | RMR | LVS | MMR | MOT | 65th | 130 | |
