= Ricky Sanders (racing driver) =

American racing driver

- Born: July 30, 1966 (age 60); Stockbridge, Georgia, U.S.

NASCAR O'Reilly Auto Parts Series career
- 1 race run over 1 year
- Best finish: 145th (2001)
- First race: 2001 South Carolina 200 (Darlington)
Wins	Top tens	Poles
0	0	0

NASCAR FedEx Freight Truck Series career
- 27 races run over 4 years
- Best finish: 27th (2001)
- First race: 2000 Pronto Auto Parts 400K (Texas)
- Last race: 2003 Federated Auto Parts 200 (Nashville)
Wins	Top tens	Poles
0	0	0

Ricky Sanders (born July 30, 1966) is an American former stock car racing driver. He raced part-time in the NASCAR Craftsman Truck Series from 2000 to 2003.

== Racing career ==
=== Busch Series ===
Sanders only ran one career NASCAR Busch Series race. It came in 2001, when Jimmy Means allowed Sanders to pilot his No. 52 in a start-and-park deal. Sanders started 39th, but parked six laps into the race. He finished 41st.

=== Craftsman Truck Series ===
Sanders made his Truck debut in 2000, driving for Walsh Racing. He made his first start in the No. 9 Walsh Ford at Texas, where he started 32nd and wound up 30th. He also added on a 22nd at Kentucky before moving onto the No. 27 Hastings Filters Ford for three more starts. After finishes of 26th and 31st, Sanders set his season best finish of 16th in his return to Texas. It would wind up being his best career finish.

Sanders ran 13 races in 2001, en route to 27th in points. It was a miserable year for Sanders, who joined the No. 19 James Murphy Ford team. He only managed a best finish of 20th at Nashville, although he did finish in the top-25 in half of his starts. Sanders struggled with finishing races, as his team only completed seven of their 13 starts.

Sanders' low-budget team only managed to make three starts in 2002. However, Sanders had a productive year. He was 19th in the season opener at Daytona. After a 32nd at Las Vegas, Sanders managed a 21st at California, earning two top-21s in three 2002 starts.

Sanders' team made six starts in 2003. It was a decent year for Sanders and his team, as they earned top-20 finishes in half of their starts. Their best was a 17th at Texas, 19th at Kentucky and 20th at Gateway. However, the budget issue finally bit. Sanders and team had to close up shop following the Nashville race.

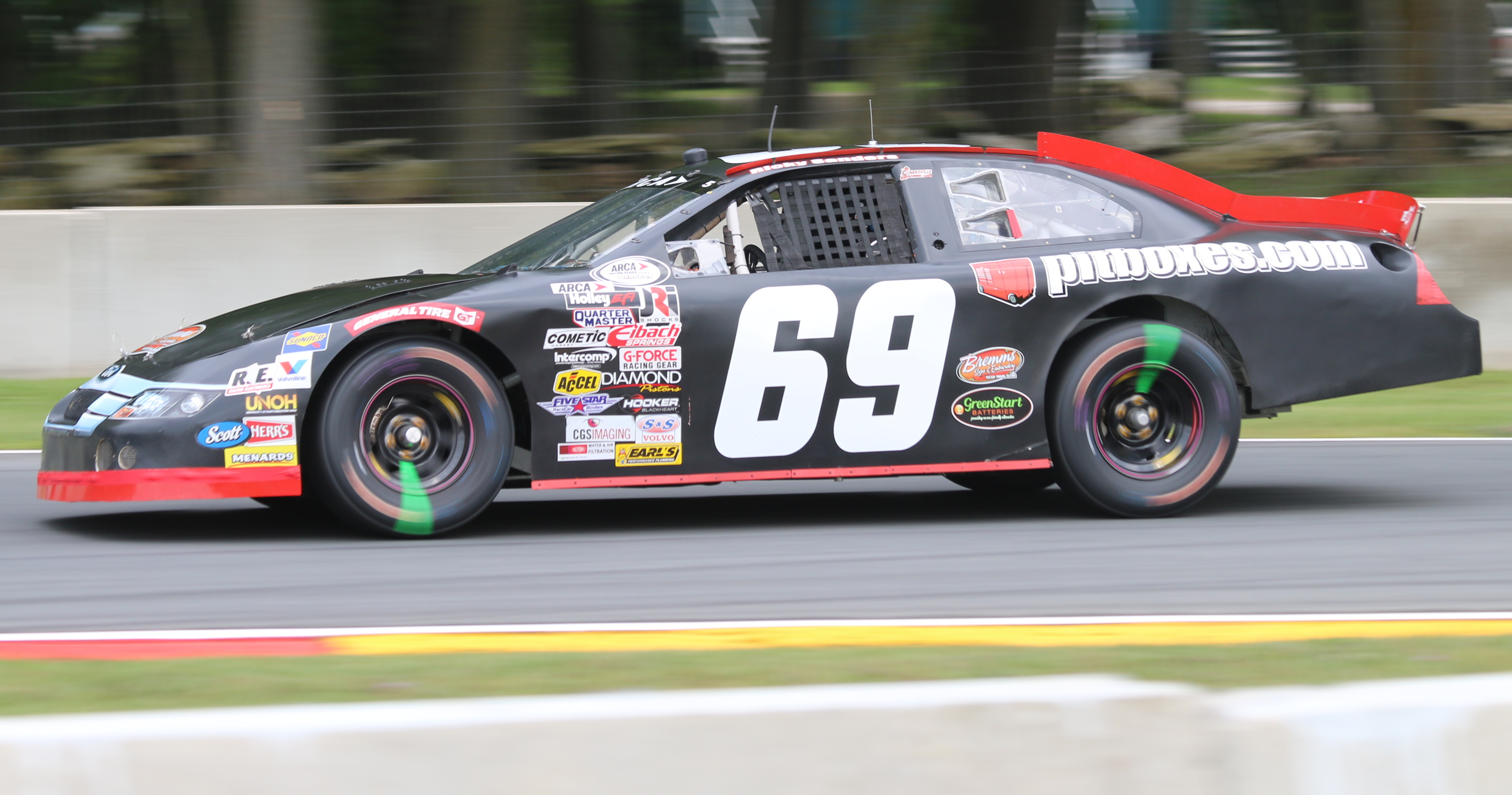
Sanders racing in a 2017 ARCA race at Road America

=== Sports car racing ===
Today, Sanders is a competitor in SCCA's Trans-Am competition, in TA2. He drives for his own single-car team which he self-sponsors through his company Pitboxes.com.

== Motorsports career results ==
=== NASCAR ===
(key) (Bold – Pole position awarded by qualifying time. Italics – Pole position earned by points standings or practice time. * – Most laps led.)

==== Busch Series ====
NASCAR Busch Series results
Year	Team	No.	Make	1	2	3	4	5	6	7	8	9	10	11	12	13	14	15	16	17	18	19	20	21	22	23	24	25	26	27	28	29	30	31	32	33	NBSC	Pts	Ref
2001	Jimmy Means Racing	52	Ford	DAY	CAR	LVS	ATL	DAR	BRI	TEX	NSH	TAL	CAL	RCH	NHA	NZH	CLT	DOV	KEN	MLW	GLN	CHI	GTY	PPR	IRP	MCH	BRI	DAR; 41	RCH	DOV	KAN	CLT	MEM	PHO	CAR	HOM	145th	40	

==== Craftsman Truck Series ====
NASCAR Craftsman Truck Series results
Year	Team	No.	Make	1	2	3	4	5	6	7	8	9	10	11	12	13	14	15	16	17	18	19	20	21	22	23	24	25	NCTC	Pts	Ref
2000	Ricky Sanders Racing	19	Ford	DAY; DNQ	HOM	PHO	MMR	MAR	PIR	GTY	MEM; DNQ	PPR	EVG							MCH; DNQ	IRP	NSV; DNQ							36th	667	
2000	Raptor Performance Motorsports	9	Ford											TEX; 30	KEN; 22	GLN	MLW	NHA	NZH										36th	667	
2000	CJ Racing	27	Ford																				CIC; 26	RCH; 31	DOV; DNQ	TEX; 16	CAL		36th	667	
2001	Ricky Sanders Racing	19	Ford	DAY; DNQ	HOM; 34	MMR	MAR; 34	GTY; 25	DAR; 32	PPR; 34	DOV; 22	TEX; 24	MEM	MLW	KAN; 35	KEN; 25	NHA	IRP	NSH; 20	CIC; 21	NZH; 23	RCH	SBO; 31	TEX	LVS	PHO	CAL		27th	1091	
2002	Ricky Sanders Racing	19	Ford	DAY; 19	DAR; DNQ	MAR	GTY	PPR; DNQ	DOV	TEX	MEM	MLW	KAN	KEN; DNQ	NHA	MCH	IRP	NSH	RCH	TEX	SBO	LVS; 32	CAL; 21	PHO; DNQ	HOM				58th	273	
2003	Ricky Sanders Racing	19	Ford	DAY; DNQ	DAR	MMR	MAR	CLT	DOV	TEX; 17	MEM	MLW	KAN; 30	KEN; 19	GTW; 20	MCH; 22	IRP	NSH; 27	BRI	RCH	NHA	CAL; DNQ	LVS; DNQ	SBO	TEX	MAR	PHO	HOM	41st	573	

=== ARCA Racing Series ===
(key) (Bold – Pole position awarded by qualifying time. Italics – Pole position earned by points standings or practice time. * – Most laps led.)

ARCA Racing Series results
Year	Team	No.	Make	1	2	3	4	5	6	7	8	9	10	11	12	13	14	15	16	17	18	19	20	21	22	23	ARSC	Pts	Ref
1992		18	Buick	DAY	FIF	TWS	TAL; 16	TOL	KIL	POC	MCH	FRS	KIL	NSH	DEL	POC	HPT	FRS	ISF	TOL	DSF	TWS	SLM	ATL			148th	-	
2003	Mark Gibson Racing	56	Chevy	DAY	ATL	NSH	SLM	TOL	KEN	CLT	BLN	KAN; 35	MCH	LER	POC	POC	NSH	ISF	WIN	DSF	CHI	SLM	TAL	CLT	SBO		185th	55	
2006	Hixson Motorsports	23	Chevy	DAY; DNQ														MCH; 30							TAL; 22		16th	3270	
2006	Hixson Motorsports	23	Pontiac		NSH; DNQ	SLM; 17	WIN; DNQ	KEN; 37	TOL; DNQ	POC; 37	MCH; 39	KAN; 36	KEN; 16	BLN; 14	POC; 17	GTW; 26	NSH; 37		ISF; 23	MIL; 30	TOL; 18	DSF; 24	CHI; 21	SLM; 17		IOW; 29	16th	3270	
2007	TC Motorsports	35	Chevy	DAY	USA	NSH	SLM	KAN	WIN	KEN	TOL	IOW	POC	MCH	BLN	KEN	POC	NSH	ISF	MIL	GTW	DSF	CHI	SLM	TAL	TOL; DNQ	185th	25	
2008	TC Motorsports	35	Chevy	DAY	SLM	IOW	KAN	CAR; 45	KEN	TOL	POC	MCH	CAY	KEN	BLN	POC	NSH	ISF	DSF	CHI	SLM	NJM	TAL	TOL			156th	30	
2017	Kimmel Racing	69	Ford	DAY; 7	NSH	SLM												ROA; 18	DSF	SLM	CHI	KEN	KAN				47th	420	
2017	Kimmel Racing	08	Ford				TAL; 29	TOL	ELK	POC	MCH	MAD	IOW	IRP	POC	WIN	ISF										47th	420	
