= Liberty Racing =

American auto racing team

Liberty Auto Group, Inc.
- Owner(s): Brad Daugherty; Jim Harrick
- Base: Lorain, Ohio
- Series: NASCAR Craftsman Truck Series
- Race drivers: Butch Miller (1995-1996); Kenny Irwin Jr. (1997); Wayne Anderson (1998); Kevin Harvick (1999) Kenny Martin (2000)
- Manufacturer: Ford
- Opened: 1995
- Closed: 2000

Career
- Race victories: 2 (1997 Homestead-Miami Speedway; 1997 Texas Motor Speedway)

Liberty Racing was an American auto racing team co-owned by former Cleveland Cavaliers player Brad Daugherty and owner of Liberty auto Group Jim Herrick. The team ran a single Ford in the NASCAR Craftsman Truck Series between 1995 and 2000. Notable drivers included Kevin Harvick and Kenny Irwin Jr.

== History ==
In 1995, Butch Miller joined the fledgling Craftsman Truck Series, driving the No. 98 Raybestos/Herrick Racing Ford. He would run full-time before leaving at the end of 1996. Kenny Irwin Jr would join, and score 2 wins at Homestead-Miami Speedway and Texas Motor Speedway, seven top-5s, and 10 top-10 finishes in 1997, on his way to a 10th-place finish in the final point standings. He also won Rookie of the Year honors that season. The manager in 1997 was Tim Stevens and the mechanic was Dave Carriere.

=== 1998 ===
Wayne Anderson drove the No. 84 truck in the 1998 season with Troy Selberg as crew chief.

=== 1999 ===
Kevin Harvick drove the No. 98 truck in the 1999 season with Roland Wlodyka as crew chief. Harvick got six top-five finishes. Before leaving the team after seasons end, to drive for Richard Childress Racing in the Busch Series. While Porter Cable left to sponsor Jeff Purvis at Joe Gibbs Racing.

=== 2000 ===
Kenny Martin was hired to replace Harvick, despite the team not having a sponsor. Martin would be released after Memphis when the team closed its doors due to sponsorship issues.

== Motorsports results ==
=== Craftsman Truck Series ===
==== Truck No. 62 results ====
Year	Driver	No.	Make	1	2	3	4	5	6	7	8	9	10	11	12	13	14	15	16	17	18	19	20	21	22	23	24	Owners	Pts
1996	Kenny Irwin Jr.	62	Ford	HOM	PHO	POR	EVG	TUS	CNS	HPT	BRI	NZH	MLW	LVL	I70	IRP	FLM	GLN	NSV	RCH; 5	NHA	MAR	NWS	SON	MMR	PHO	LVS		

==== Truck No. 84 results ====
Year	Driver	No.	Make	1	2	3	4	5	6	7	8	9	10	11	12	13	14	15	16	17	18	19	20	21	22	23	24	25	26	27	Owners	Pts
1997	Wayne Anderson	97	Ford	WDW	TUS	HOM	PHO	POR	EVG	I70	NHA	TEX	BRI	NZH	MLW	LVL	CNS	HPT	IRP	FLM	NSV; 31	GLN	RCH	MAR	SON	MMR	CAL	PHO	LVS; 29			
1998	Wayne Anderson	84	Ford	WDW; 15	HOM; 19	PHO; 20	POR; 25	EVG; 15	I70; 9	GLN; 26	TEX; 21	BRI; 34	MLW; 25	NZH; 26	CAL; 34	PPR; 25	IRP; 18	NHA; 23	FLM; 30	NSV; 18	HPT; 12	LVL; 26	RCH; 21	MEM; 10								
1998	Bryan Reffner	84	Ford																						GTY; 10							
1998	Randy Tolsma	84	Ford																							MAR; 14						
1998	Doug George	84	Ford																								SON; 10	MMR; 12	PHO; 14			
1998	Randy Renfrow	84	Ford																											LVS; 40		

==== Truck No. 98 results ====
Year	Driver	No.	Make	1	2	3	4	5	6	7	8	9	10	11	12	13	14	15	16	17	18	19	20	21	22	23	24	25	26	27	Owners	Pts
1995	Butch Miller	98	Ford	PHO; 7	TUS; 9	SGS; 4	MMR; 5	POR; 3	EVG; 3	I70; 3	LVL; 3	BRI; 3	MLW; 18	CNS; 1	HPT; 8	IRP; 12	FLM; 14	RCH; 35	MAR; 25	NWS; 2	SON; 7	MMR; 6	PHO; 22									
1996	Butch Miller	98	Ford	HOM; 24	PHO; 3	POR; 5	EVG; 27	TUS; 16	CNS; 2	HPT; 19	BRI; 11	NZH; 3	MLW; 27	LVL; 9	I70; 11	IRP; 13	FLM; 10	GLN; 11	NSV; 4	RCH; 7	NHA; 26	MAR; 2	NWS; 3									
1996	Dorsey Schroeder	98	Ford																					SON; 21								
1996	Kenny Irwin Jr.	98	Ford																						MMR; 15	PHO; 26	LVS; 40					
1997	Kenny Irwin Jr.	98	Ford	WDW; 7	TUS; 14	HOM; 1	PHO; 17	POR; 15	EVG; 5	I70; 14	NHA; 5	TEX; 1	BRI; 26	NZH; 27	MLW; 15	LVL; 18	CNS; 14	HPT; 18	IRP; 7	FLM; 25	NSV; 21	GLN; 28	RCH; 5	MAR; 8	SON; 31	MMR; 16	CAL; 3	PHO; 4	LVS; 25			
1998	Rob Rizzo	98	Ford	WDW	HOM; 30	PHO	POR	EVG	I70	GLN; 8	TEX; DNQ	BRI	MLW; DNQ	NZH	CAL	PPR	IRP	NHA	FLM	NSV												
1998	Bryan Reffner	98	Ford																		HPT; 34	LVL	RCH	MEM	GTY	MAR	SON	MMR	PHO			
1998	Doug George	98	Ford																											LVS; 15		
1999	Kevin Harvick	98	Ford	HOM; 27	PHO; 23	EVG; 9	MMR; 2	MAR; 10	MEM; 2*	PPR; 3	I70; 16	BRI; 6	TEX; 24	PIR; 20	GLN; 7	MLW; 17	NSV; 2	NZH; 25	MCH; 11	NHA; 15	IRP; 4	GTW; 27	HPT; 31	RCH; 22	LVS; 9	LVL; 4	TEX; 20	CAL; 15				
2000	Kenny Martin	98	Ford	DAY; 5	HOM; 29	PHO; 32	MMR; 33	MAR; 31	PIR	GTY; 22	MEM; 9	PPR	EVG	TEX	KEN	GLN	MLW	NHA	NZH	MCH	IRP	NSV	CIC		DOV; DNQ	TEX	CAL					
2000	Brian Rose	98	Ford																					RCH; DNQ								
