= Rick Ware =

American stock car racing driver and team owner

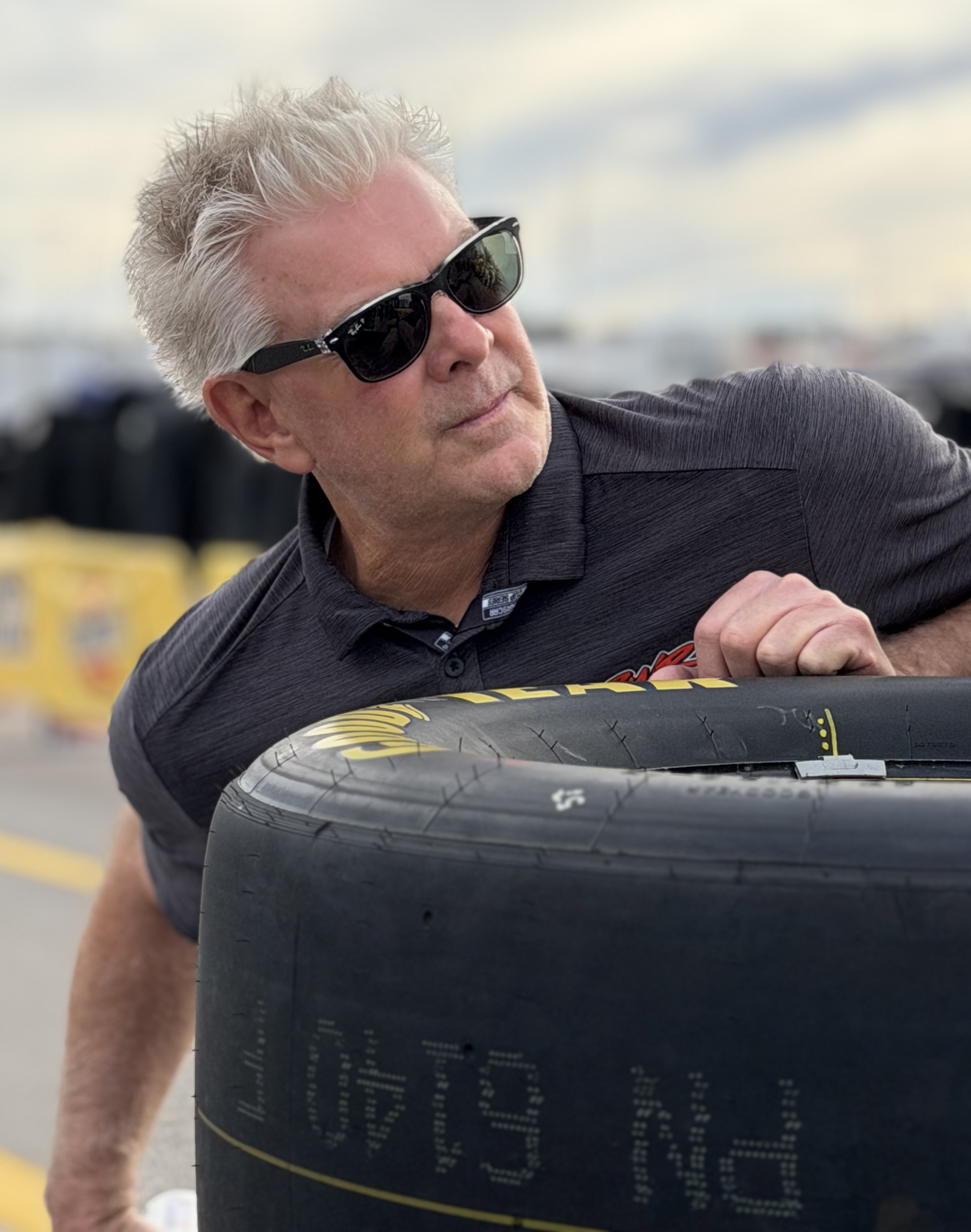
- Ware in 2026
- Born: August 6, 1963 (age 63); Los Angeles, California, U.S.
- Awards: West Coast Stock Car Hall of Fame (2025)

NASCAR Cup Series career
- 1 race run over 1 year
- Best finish: 97th (1990)
- First race: 1990 Budweiser at The Glen (Watkins Glen)
Wins	Top tens	Poles
0	0	0

NASCAR O'Reilly Auto Parts Series career
- 2 races run over 2 years
- Best finish: 95th (1990)
- First race: 1990 Pontiac 300 (Nazareth)
- Last race: 1995 Busch Light 300 (Atlanta)
Wins	Top tens	Poles
0	0	0

NASCAR FedEx Freight Truck Series career
- 16 races run over 3 years
- Best finish: 24th (2000)
- First race: 1999 NAPA Auto Parts 200 (Fontana)
- Last race: 2003 Sears 200 (Michigan)
Wins	Top tens	Poles
0	0	0

ARCA Menards Series career
- 1 race run over 1 year
- Best finish: N/A (1995)
- First race: 1995 Hoosier General Tire 500k (Atlanta)
Wins	Top tens	Poles
0	1	0

ARCA Menards Series West career
- 10 races run over 2 years
- Best finish: 19th (1999)
- First race: 1998 Sam's Town 125 (Las Vegas)
- Last race: 1999 Golden Coast 150 (Las Vegas)
Wins	Top tens	Poles
0	0	0
- Statistics up to date as of May 30, 2025.

Richard Shane Ware (born August 6, 1963) is an American professional racecar driver and owner of Rick Ware Racing.

When he was nine years old, Ware began racing motocross and moved up to the BMX class when he was twelve.

In 1983, Ware was named Rookie of the Year in the California Sports Car Club.

In 1990, Ware moved to North Carolina and made his NASCAR Winston Cup Series debut that year at The Bud at the Glen in the No. 22 owned by Buddy Baker. He spent the next decade running short tracks in the ARCA, and the Busch Series. He suffered injuries in 1996 at Watkins Glen International Raceway, while practicing a Winston Cup car, he crashed into the wall and was unconscious for 45 minutes. He made his return to NASCAR in 1998, when he was unable to qualify for the Save Mart/Kragen 350 in his No. 70 Ford Thunderbird.

Ware ran nine of the 14 races in NASCAR West Series in 1999, before he moved up to the Craftsman Truck Series in 2000, where he ran his own No. 51 Chevys, but ran a limited schedule due to sponsorship issues and injuries. Since then, he has run one Craftsman Truck race and is owner of Rick Ware Racing. He is the father of Cody Ware and Carson Ware.

== Motorsports career results ==
=== NASCAR ===
(key) (Bold – Pole position awarded by qualifying time. Italics – Pole position earned by points standings or practice time. * – Most laps led.)

==== Winston Cup Series ====
NASCAR Winston Cup Series results
Year	Team	No.	Make	1	2	3	4	5	6	7	8	9	10	11	12	13	14	15	16	17	18	19	20	21	22	23	24	25	26	27	28	29	30	31	32	33	NWCC	Pts	Ref
1990	U.S. Racing	22	Pontiac	DAY	RCH	CAR	ATL	DAR	BRI	NWS	MAR	TAL	CLT	DOV	SON	POC	MCH	DAY	POC	TAL	GLN; 36	MCH	BRI	DAR	RCH	DOV	MAR	NWS	CLT	CAR	PHO	ATL					97th	55	
1998	Ware Racing Enterprises	70	Ford	DAY	CAR	LVS	ATL	DAR	BRI	TEX	MAR	TAL	CAL	CLT	DOV	RCH	MCH	POC	SON; DNQ	NHA	POC	IND	GLN	MCH	BRI	NHA	DAR	RCH	DOV	MAR	CLT	TAL	DAY	PHO	CAR	ATL	NA	0	

==== Busch Series ====
NASCAR Busch Series results
Year	Team	No.	Make	1	2	3	4	5	6	7	8	9	10	11	12	13	14	15	16	17	18	19	20	21	22	23	24	25	26	27	28	29	30	31	NBSC	Pts	Ref
1990	Linville Racing	62	Chevy	DAY; DNQ	RCH	CAR	MAR	HCY	DAR	BRI	LAN	SBO	NZH; 25	HCY	CLT	DOV	ROU	VOL	MYB	OXF	NHA	SBO	DUB	IRP	ROU	BRI	DAR	RCH	DOV	MAR	CLT	NHA	CAR	MAR	95th	88	
1995	Ware Racing Enterprises	98	Chevy	DAY	CAR	RCH	ATL; 41	NSV	DAR	BRI	HCY	NHA	NZH	CLT	DOV	MYB	GLN	MLW	TAL	SBO	IRP	MCH	BRI	DAR	RCH	DOV	CLT; DNQ	CAR	HOM						110th	40	

==== Craftsman Truck Series ====
NASCAR Craftsman Truck Series results
Year	Team	No.	Make	1	2	3	4	5	6	7	8	9	10	11	12	13	14	15	16	17	18	19	20	21	22	23	24	25	NCTC	Pts	Ref
1999	Ware Racing Enterprises	51	Chevy	HOM	PHO	EVG	MMR	MAR	MEM	PPR	I70	BRI	TEX	PIR	GLN	MLW	NSV	NZH	MCH	NHA	IRP	GTY	HPT	RCH	LVS; DNQ	LVL	TEX; DNQ		71st	174	
1999	Ware Racing Enterprises	81	Chevy																									CAL; 24	71st	174	
2000	Ware Racing Enterprises	51	Chevy	DAY; DNQ	HOM	PHO; 23	MMR; DNQ	MAR; DNQ	PIR; 19	GTY; DNQ	MEM; 21	PPR; 31	EVG; 17	TEX; 18	KEN; 24	GLN; 22	MLW	NHA	NZH	MCH; 26	IRP; 34	NSV; 21	CIC; 21	RCH; 23	DOV	TEX; 13			24th	1585	
2000	Ware Racing Enterprises	81	Chevy																								CAL; DNQ		24th	1585	
2003	MLB Motorsports	66	Chevy	DAY	DAR	MMR	MAR	CLT	DOV	TEX	MEM	MLW	KAN	KEN	GTW	MCH; 36	IRP	NSH	BRI	RCH	NHA	CAL	LVS	SBO	TEX	MAR	PHO	HOM	129th	55	
