= Randy Tolsma =

American racing driver

- Born: May 4, 1966 (age 60); Meridian, Idaho, U.S.

NASCAR O'Reilly Auto Parts Series career
- 13 races run over 2 years
- Best finish: 45th (2001)
- First race: 2000 MBNA.com 200 (Dover)
- Last race: 2001 Sam's Club 200 (Rockingham)
Wins	Top tens	Poles
0	0	0

NASCAR FedEx Freight Truck Series career
- 107 races run over 7 years
- Best finish: 8th (2000)
- First race: 1996 GM Goodwrench/AC Delco 300 (Phoenix)
- Last race: 2002 Advance Auto Parts 250 (Martinsville)
- First win: 1997 Dodge California Truckstop 300 (Mesa Marin)
- Last win: 2000 Federated Auto Parts 250 (Nashville)
Wins	Top tens	Poles
2	46	2

Randy Tolsma (born May 4, 1966 in Meridian, Idaho) is an American former stock car racing driver. Tolsma began his racing career in go-karts at the age of nine, before moving into sprint cars, running as high as USAC, where he won four track championships. He failed to qualify for the 1996 Indianapolis 500 and then shifted his focus to NASCAR and made his first start in the Craftsman Truck Series later that year. From then until 2002, he made 107 starts in the Truck Series. He also made thirteen Busch Series starts in 2000 and 2001.

Tolsma made his NASCAR debut in 1996 at Phoenix International Raceway. Driving the No. 61 IWX Motor Freight Chevrolet Silverado for Steve Coulter's Xpress Motorsports team, he started sixteenth but finished 29th after wrecking early in the race. Tolsma returned to the team in 1997, running a limited schedule for Coulter. Running fifteen races, he had five top-tens, including his first career win at Mesa Marin Raceway, where he held off fellow rookie Stacy Compton for the final twelve laps. Tolsma teamed with Coulter to run full-time in 1998, grabbing his first career pole at Indianapolis Raceway Park, and had ten top-ten finishes. Late in the season, Coulter shut down his Truck team, and Tolsma split the year driving for Liberty Racing, Phil Bonifield, and Dominic Dobson. He ran 26 races total and finished fourteenth in points.

For 1999, Tolsma signed to drive the new No. 25 Supergard Motor Oil Dodge Ram for Impact Motorsports. He sat on the pole in the season-opening race at Homestead and posted ten top-ten finishes throughout the course of the season, finishing eleventh in points. In 2000, Tolsma grabbed fifteen top-tens and a win at Nashville. He finished eighth in points. He also made his Busch Series debut at Dover, driving the No. 25 Lance Snacks Chevy for Team Rensi Motorsports. He started 38th and finishing 28th.

After Impact began running into financial problems, Tolsma left to drive for Rensi's truck team. Unfortunately, their No. 16 was unsponsored, and despite Tolsma being in the top-ten in points, the team folded after the Power Stroke Diesel 200. He finished out the year driving twelve races for Rensi's Busch team, his best finish an eighteenth at Memphis. He was unable to keep his ride for the 2002 season, and ran one Truck race at Martinsville, where he finished eighteenth. He has not raced in NASCAR since.

== Motorsports career results ==
=== IRL IndyCar Series ===
Year	Team	Chassis	No.	Engine	1	2	3	Rank	Points	Ref
1996	Zunne Group Racing	Lola T93/00	24	Buick	WDW	PHX	INDY; DNQ	-	0	

=== NASCAR ===
(key) (Bold – Pole position awarded by qualifying time. Italics – Pole position earned by points standings or practice time. * – Most laps led.)

==== Busch Series ====
NASCAR Busch Series results
Year	Team	No.	Make	1	2	3	4	5	6	7	8	9	10	11	12	13	14	15	16	17	18	19	20	21	22	23	24	25	26	27	28	29	30	31	32	33	NBSC	Pts	Ref
2000	Team Rensi Motorsports	25	Chevy	DAY	CAR	LVS	ATL	DAR	BRI	TEX	NSV	TAL	CAL	RCH	NHA	CLT	DOV	SBO	MYB	GLN	MLW	NZH	PPR	GTY	IRP	MCH	BRI	DAR	RCH	DOV; 28	CLT	CAR	MEM	PHO	HOM		100th	79	
2001	Team Rensi Motorsports	25	Chevy	DAY	CAR	LVS	ATL	DAR	BRI	TEX	NSH	TAL	CAL	RCH	NHA	NZH	CLT	DOV	KEN	MLW	GLN	CHI	GTY	PPR; 23	IRP; 33	MCH; 33	BRI; 22	DAR; 29	RCH; 38	DOV; 26	KAN; 40	CLT; 25	MEM; 18	PHO; 25	CAR; 31	HOM	45th	924	

==== Craftsman Truck Series ====
NASCAR Craftsman Truck Series results
Year	Team	No.	Make	1	2	3	4	5	6	7	8	9	10	11	12	13	14	15	16	17	18	19	20	21	22	23	24	25	26	27	NCTC	Pts	Ref
1996	Xpress Motorsports	61	Chevy	HOM	PHO	POR	EVG	TUS	CNS	HPT	BRI	NZH	MLW	LVL	I70	IRP	FLM	GLN	NSV	RCH	NHA	MAR	NWS	SON	MMR	PHO; 29	LVS; DNQ				115th	77	
1997	Xpress Motorsports	61	Chevy	WDW; DNQ	TUS; 19	HOM; DNQ	PHO; DNQ	POR	EVG; 26	I70; DNQ	NHA	TEX; 8	BRI	NZH	MLW; 31	LVL	CNS	HPT; 15	IRP; 6	FLM	NSV; 32	GLN; 32	RCH; 9	MAR; 14	SON; 18	MMR; 1	CAL; 5	PHO; 33	LVS; 30		22nd	1802	
1998	Xpress Motorsports	61	Chevy	WDW; 20	HOM; 37	PHO; 10	POR; 2	EVG; 3	I70; 17	GLN; 9	TEX; 25	BRI; 5	MLW; 12	NZH; 18	CAL; 6	PPR; 9	**IRP**; 6	NHA; 25	FLM; 26	NSV; 6	HPT; 25	LVL; 22	RCH; 7	MEM; 13	GTY; 16						14th	3121	
1998	Liberty Racing	84	Ford																							MAR; 14					14th	3121	
1998	Team Racing	11	Chevy																								SON; 19				14th	3121	
1998	PacWest S/T Motorsports	78	Dodge																									MMR; 34	PHO; 34	LVS; 25	14th	3121	
1999	Impact Motorsports	25	Dodge	**HOM**; 17*	PHO; 15	EVG; 11	MMR; 13	MAR; 7	MEM; 8	PPR; 26	I70; 8	BRI; 16	TEX; 17	PIR; 6	GLN; 13	MLW; 8	NSV; 21	NZH; 5	MCH; 15	NHA; 10	IRP; 9	GTY; 16	HPT; 13	RCH; 8	LVS; 16	LVL; 25	TEX; 5	CAL; 12			11th	3173	
2000	Impact Motorsports	25	Dodge	DAY; 15	HOM; 6	PHO; 31	MMR; 25*	MAR; 7	PIR; 29	GTY; 3	MEM; 7	PPR; 12	EVG; 2*	TEX; 3	KEN; 6	GLN; 10	MLW; 2	NHA; 3	NZH; 31	MCH; 10	IRP; 10	NSV; 1	CIC; 10	RCH; 34	DOV; 16		CAL; 20				8th	3157	
2000	Impact Motorsports	25	Chevy																							TEX; 7					8th	3157	
2001	Team Rensi Motorsports	61	Chevy	DAY; 5	HOM; 6	MMR; 10	MAR; 5	GTY; 11	DAR; 13	PPR; 28	DOV; 28	TEX; 8	MEM; 13	MLW; 30	KAN; 13	KEN; 8	NHA; 12	IRP; 19	NSH	CIC	NZH	RCH	SBO	TEX	LVS	PHO	CAL				18th	1859	
2002	Team Rensi Motorsports	61	Chevy	DAY	DAR	MAR; 18	GTY	PPR	DOV	TEX	MEM	MLW	KAN	KEN	NHA	MCH	IRP	NSH	RCH	TEX	SBO	LVS	CAL	PHO	HOM						81st	109	
