= Randy Renfrow =

American stock car racing driver (born 1958)

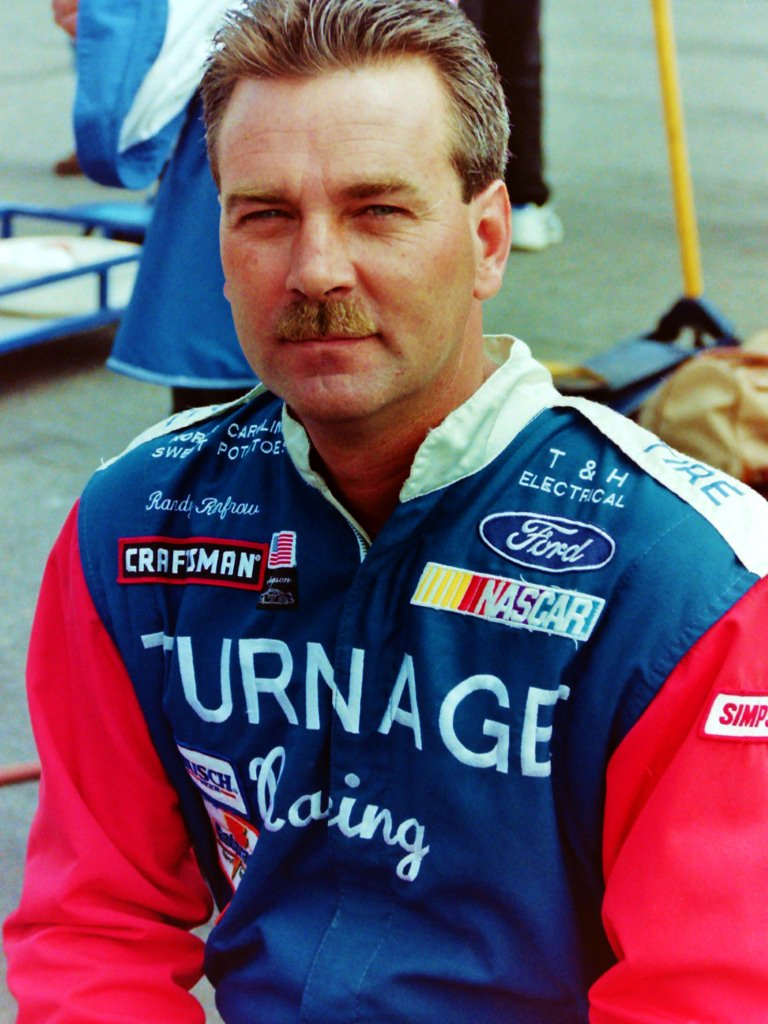
- Renfrow in 1996
- Born: January 28, 1958 (age 68); Wilson, North Carolina, U.S.

NASCAR Cup Series career
- 1 race run over 1 year
- Best finish: 85th (2002)
- First race: 2002 Pontiac Excitement 400 (Richmond)
Wins	Top tens	Poles
0	0	0

NASCAR FedEx Freight Truck Series career
- 48 races run over 6 years
- Best finish: 23rd (2000)
- First race: 1996 Coca-Cola 200 (Bristol)
- Last race: 2003 MBNA Armed Forces Family 200 (Dover)
Wins	Top tens	Poles
0	6	0

Randy Renfrow (born January 28, 1958) is an American former stock car racing driver. He raced many years in the NASCAR Craftsman Truck Series before retiring. Renfrow has won 237 late model races at 40 different tracks over his career.

== Winston Cup Series ==
Renfrow attempted numerous Winston Cup Series races in early 2002, all for Price Motorsports. However, Renfrow only made one race. He would start and finish 43rd (last) on the spring field at Richmond. He only competed 58 laps in that race before retiring due to oil pump failure.

== Craftsman Truck Series ==
Renfrow started his CTS career in 1996, running seven races. His debut came for the #41 George Turnage Dodge team at Bristol. He started the race in fifteenth position, but finished 27th after mechanical issues. In fact, Renfrow would only finish one race in 1996, a race at Richmond in which he would finish twelfth. It would prove to be his only top-twenty finish on the year. However, Renfrow qualified well. He had two top-ten starts, the best being a fifth at Nashville.

Renfrow competed in two races in 1997 for the Turnage team. He was 32nd at Bristol and 24th at Richmond, both without very much to comment on. He did not finish either race.

Renfrow began 1998 running Dominic Dobson's No. 78 Dodge. In his first race at California, Renfrow qualified fourth. Renfrow then led his first career CTS laps at Pikes Peak, leading ten laps before fuel issues forced him out. He would also lead nine laps at Loudon, but the results were not there and Renfrow left the team. He drove the No. 61 IWX Chevy at Martinsville in his next start. There, he drove a solid race to ninth place. It was his first career CTS top-ten. The run earned Renfrow a run in the No. 66 Ford for two races, and then the No. 84 Ford for the season finale. However, for those two teams, his best race was 26th at Vegas and neither ride resulted in a 1999 offer. Overall, he finished thirtieth in points.

Renfrow would once again finish thirtieth in points during 1999. He started off his season by replacing the injured Rick Carelli in his No. 6 RE/MAX Chevy for Chesrown Racing. However, in three starts, Renfrow only managed a best finish of fifteenth at I-70, before Carelli came back. Renfrow then moved back to the No. 41 Dodge, now owned by TKO Motorsports. He ran solidly in his six starts for that team. In his first start for the team, he started on the outside pole at Michigan, before finishing 26th. After that, he had five straight top-twenty finishes to close out the year. This included a ninth at Richmond, matching his career best.

The late season for TKO earned Renfrow the full ride in 2000. In fourteen starts for the team, Renfrow managed four top-tens. This included his first career top-five and eventual best career finish of fifth at Mesa Marin. Oddly, after the race at Milwaukee, Renfrow was released in favor of Jamie McMurray. Renfrow was fifteenth at that time in points, but only raced one more time in 2000. That was for Conely Motorsports at Texas, where he finished thirtieth.

Renfrow returned to the series for three races in 2003. He drove the No. 66 MLB Motorsports Dodge in all three starts. However, the team was low-budget and the best Renfrow managed was 25th at Dover, even though he did not finish that race or any other of his 2003 starts.

Renfrow has not raced in major NASCAR since. He continues to race Late Model cars occasionally at Wake County Speedway in Raleigh, North Carolina, owns Randy Renfrow Race Cars, and is a crew chief in late model racing for Coulter Motorsports.

== Motorsports career results ==
=== NASCAR ===
(key) (Bold - Pole position awarded by qualifying time. Italics - Pole position earned by points standings or practice time. * – Most laps led.)

==== Winston Cup Series ====
NASCAR Winston Cup Series results
Year	Team	No.	Make	1	2	3	4	5	6	7	8	9	10	11	12	13	14	15	16	17	18	19	20	21	22	23	24	25	26	27	28	29	30	31	32	33	34	35	36	NWCC	Pts	Ref
1998	Mansion Motorsports	85	Chevy	DAY; Wth	CAR	LVS	ATL	DAR	BRI	TEX	MAR	TAL	CAL	CLT	DOV	RCH	MCH	POC	SON	NHA	POC	IND	GLN	MCH	BRI	NHA	DAR	RCH	DOV	MAR	CLT	TAL	DAY	PHO	CAR	ATL				N/A	0	
2002	Price Motorsports	59	Dodge	DAY	CAR; DNQ	LVS	ATL	DAR	BRI	TEX	MAR; DNQ	TAL	CAL	RCH; 43	CLT; DNQ	DOV; DNQ	POC	MCH	SON	DAY	CHI	NHA	POC	IND	GLN	MCH	BRI	DAR	RCH	NHA	DOV	KAN	TAL	CLT	MAR	ATL	CAR	PHO	HOM	85th	34	

===== Daytona 500 =====
Year	Team	Manufacturer	Start	Finish
1998	Mansion Motorsports	Chevrolet	Wth	

==== Craftsman Truck Series ====
NASCAR Craftsman Truck Series results
Year	Team	No.	Make	1	2	3	4	5	6	7	8	9	10	11	12	13	14	15	16	17	18	19	20	21	22	23	24	25	26	27	NCTC	Pts	Ref
1996	Greg Turnage	41	Ford	HOM	PHO	POR	EVG	TUS	CNS	HPT	BRI; 27	NZH	MLW	LVL; 21	I70	IRP; DNQ	FLM; 28	GLN	NSV; 26	RCH; 12	NHA	MAR; 24	NWS; 35	SON	MMR	PHO; DNQ	LVS; DNQ				33rd	733	
1997	Greg Turnage	41	Ford	WDW; DNQ	TUS	HOM	PHO	POR	EVG	I70	NHA	TEX	BRI; 32	NZH	MLW	LVL	CNS	HPT	IRP	FLM	NSV	GLN	RCH; 36	MAR; DNQ	SON	MMR	CAL	PHO	LVS		77th	238	
1998	PacWest S/T Motorsports	78	Dodge	WDW	HOM	PHO	POR	EVG	I70	GLN	TEX	BRI	MLW	NZH	CAL; 33	PPR; 27	IRP; 16	NHA; 32	FLM; DNQ	NSV; 29	HPT	LVL; 18	RCH; 31	MEM	GTY; 25						30th	1074	
1998	Xpress Motorsports	61	Chevy																							MAR; 9	SON				30th	1074	
1998	Phelon Motorsports	66	Ford																									MMR; 29	PHO; 26		30th	1074	
1998	Liberty Racing	84	Ford																											LVS; 40	30th	1074	
1999	Chesrown Racing	6	Chevy	HOM	PHO	EVG	MMR	MAR	MEM	PPR; 22	I70; 15	BRI; 27	TEX; DNQ	PIR	GLN	MLW	NSV	NZH													30th	1055	
1999	TKO Motorsports	41	Dodge																MCH; 26	NHA	IRP	GTY; 12	HPT	RCH; 9	LVS; 20	LVL	TEX; 13	CAL; 17			30th	1055	
2000	TKO Motorsports	41	Dodge	DAY; 31	HOM; 25	PHO; 8	MMR; 5	MAR; 13	PIR; 14	GTY; 10	MEM; 30	PPR; 7	EVG; 11	TEX; 37	KEN; 28	GLN; 21	MLW; 15	NHA	NZH	MCH	IRP	NSV	CIC	RCH	DOV						23rd	1610	
2000	Conely Racing	7	Chevy																							TEX; 30	CAL				23rd	1610	
2003	MLB Motorsports	66	Dodge	DAY; 33	DAR; 31	MMR	MAR	CLT	DOV; 25	TEX	MEM	MLW	KAN	KEN	GTW	MCH	IRP	NSH	BRI	RCH	NHA	CAL	LVS	SBO	TEX	MAR	PHO	HOM			76th	222	

=== CARS Late Model Stock Car Tour ===
(key) (Bold – Pole position awarded by qualifying time. Italics – Pole position earned by points standings or practice time. * – Most laps led. ** – All laps led.)

CARS Late Model Stock Car Tour results
Year	Team	No.	Make	1	2	3	4	5	6	7	8	9	10	11	12	CLMSCTC	Pts	Ref
2018	Randy Renfrow	20	Chevy	TCM	MYB	ROU	HCY	BRI	ACE	CCS	KPT	HCY	WKS; 20	OCS	SBO	46th	23	
