= Phelon Motorsports =

Former American stock car team

- Owner: Dan Phelon
- Series: NASCAR Craftsman Truck Series
- Race drivers: Bryan Reffner, Rick Carelli, Mike Stefanik, Randy Renfrow, Johnny Chapman, Tom Hubert
- Manufacturer: Ford, Chevrolet
- Opened: 1997
- Closed: 2001

Career
- Drivers' Championships: 0
- Race victories: 1

Phelon Motorsports is a former American stock car racing team that ran from 1997 to 2001. It was most known for fielding entries in the NASCAR Craftsman Truck Series, primarily fielding the No. 66 Ford. The team won one race in 2000 with Rick Carelli at Richmond International Raceway.

Team owner Dan Phelon died on March 19, 2012 at the age of 70 after suffering from brain cancer.

== Motorsports results ==
=== Craftsman Truck Series ===
==== Truck No. 66 results ====
Year	Driver	No.	Make	1	2	3	4	5	6	7	8	9	10	11	12	13	14	15	16	17	18	19	20	21	22	23	24	25	26	27	Owners	Pts	Ref
1997	Bryan Reffner	66	Ford	WDW; 21	TUS; 31	HOM; 31	PHO; 34	POR; 21	EVG; 24	I70; 20	NHA; 8	TEX; 30	BRI; 10	NZH; 11	MLW; 13	LVL; 23	CNS; 15	HPT; 19	IRP; 15	FLM; 21	NSV; 29	GLN; 19	RCH; 15	MAR; 29	SON; 32	MMR; 32	CAL; 32	PHO; 30	LVS; 38		19th	2433	
1998	Bryan Reffner	66	Ford	WDW; 13	HOM; 31	PHO; 8	POR; 7	EVG; 8	I70; 4	GLN; 18	TEX; 35	BRI; 10	MLW; 19	NZH; 8	CAL; 13	PPR; 29	IRP; 12	NHA; 31	FLM; 3	NSV; 14											N/A	N/A	
1998	Tom Hubert	66	Ford																		HPT; 18*	LVL; 21			GTY; 5	MAR; 34	SON; 27				N/A	N/A	
1998	Johnny Chapman	66	Ford																				RCH; 36	MEM; 19							N/A	N/A	
1998	Randy Renfrow	66	Ford																									MMR; 29	PHO; 26		N/A	N/A	
1998	Mike Stefanik	66	Ford																											LVS; 8	N/A	N/A	
1999	Mike Stefanik	66	Ford	HOM; 2	PHO; 13	EVG; 24	MMR; 14	MAR; 12	MEM; 11	PPR; 11	I70; 7	BRI; 22	TEX; 28	PIR; 13	GLN; 11	MLW; 13	NSV; 8	NZH; 8	MCH; 7	NHA; 13	IRP; 16	GTY; 6	HPT; 10	RCH; 16	LVS; 32	LVL; 9	TEX; 31	CAL; 9			13th	3074	
2000	Rick Carelli	66	Ford	DAY; 7	HOM; 34	PHO; 26	MMR; 20	MAR; 33	PIR; 17	GTY; 29	MEM; 34	PPR; 20	EVG; 7	TEX; 31	KEN; 7	GLN; 32	MLW; 13	NHA; 11	NZH; 8	MCH; 31	IRP; 24	NSV; 23	CIC; 5	RCH; 1	DOV; 8	TEX; 9	CAL; 21				15th	2606	
2001	Rick Carelli	66	Ford	DAY; 13																											N/A	N/A	
2001	Rick Carelli	66	Chevy		HOM; 30	MMR; 4	MAR; 12	GTY	DAR	PPR	DOV	TEX	MEM	MLW	KAN	KEN	NHA	IRP	NSH	CIC	NZH	RCH	SBO	TEX	LVS	PHO	CAL				N/A	N/A	
