= 2000 NASCAR Craftsman Truck Series =

American motorsport season

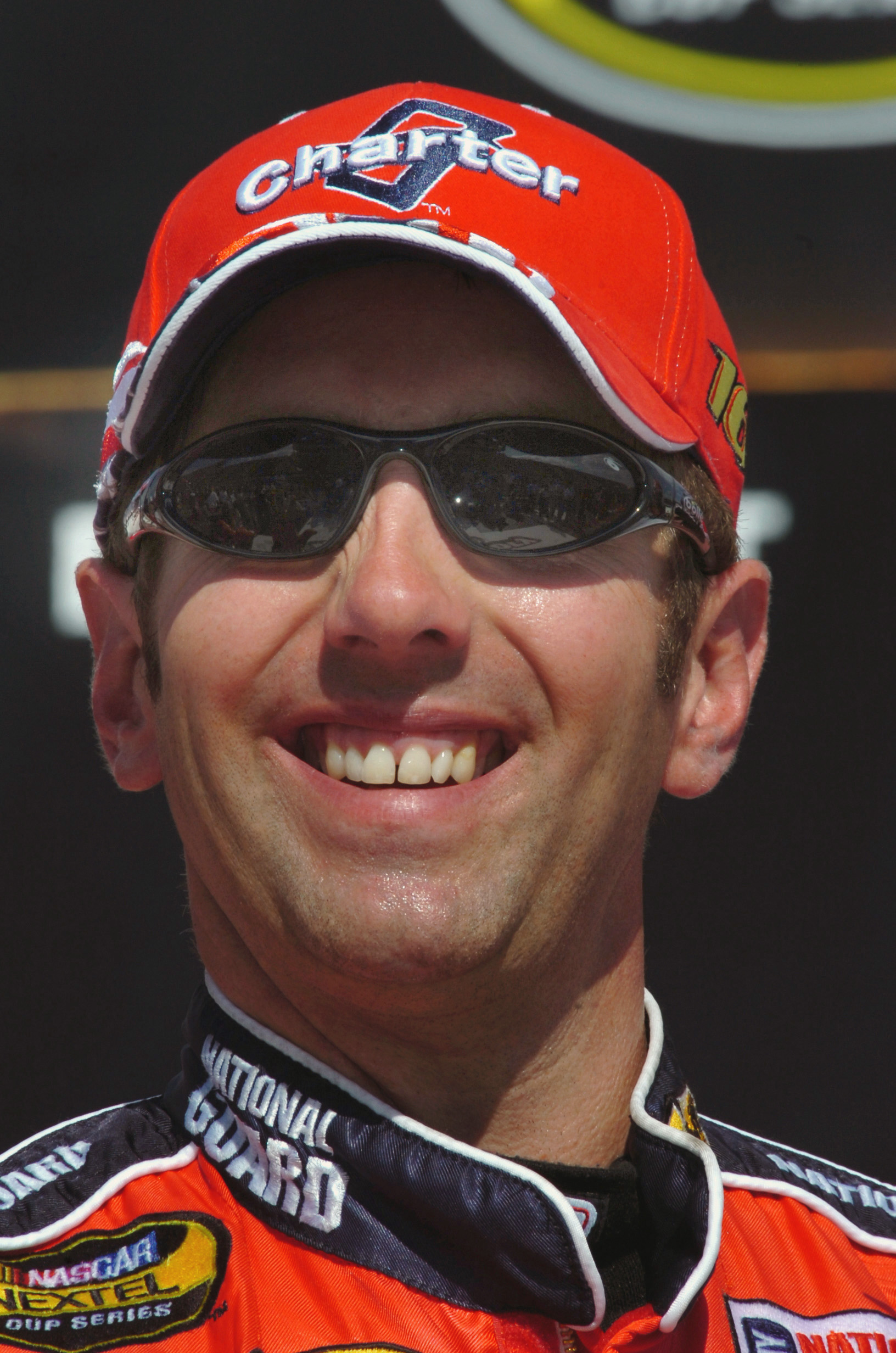
Greg Biffle, pictured in 2005, won the championship

The 2000 NASCAR Craftsman Truck Series was the sixth season of the Craftsman Truck Series, the third highest stock car racing series sanctioned by NASCAR in the United States. Greg Biffle of Roush Racing was crowned the series champion, giving Ford its first Truck Series championship and ending Chevrolet's five-year streak.

The season was marred by the death of Tony Roper in the penultimate race of the season at Texas Motor Speedway. His death was the third of three driver fatalities across the nationwide NASCAR circuits in 2000 that included Kenny Irwin Jr. and Adam Petty.

== Teams & Drivers ==
=== Complete schedule ===
Team	Truck(s)	#	Driver(s)	Listed owner(s)	Crew chief
Addington Racing	Chevrolet Silverado	60	Andy Houston	Mike Addington	Rick Ren
Bobby Hamilton Racing	Dodge Ram	18	Joe Ruttman	Bobby Hamilton	Danny Gill
Circle Bar Racing	Ford F-150	14	Rick Crawford	Tom Mitchell	Mike Cheek
Hendrick Motorsports	Chevrolet Silverado	24	Jack Sprague	Rick Hendrick	Dennis Connor
Impact Motorsports	Dodge Ram	12	Carlos Contreras (R) 23	Russell Kersh	Doug George
Impact Motorsports	Dodge Ram	12	Doug George 1	Russell Kersh	Doug George
Impact Motorsports	Dodge Ram	25	Randy Tolsma	David Hodson	Gary Showalter
Impact Motorsports	Dodge Ram	86	Mike Cope 6	David Hodson	Bryan Berry
Impact Motorsports	Dodge Ram	86	Doug George 1	David Hodson	Bryan Berry
Impact Motorsports	Dodge Ram	86	Scott Riggs 15	David Hodson	Bryan Berry
Impact Motorsports	Dodge Ram	86	Derrike Cope 2	David Hodson	Bryan Berry
K Automotive Racing	Dodge Ram	1	Dennis Setzer	Kay Keselowski	Howard Comstock
L&R Racing	Chevrolet Silverado	90	Lance Norick	Ron Norick	Paul Balmer
MacDonald Motorsports	Chevrolet Silverado	72	Randy MacDonald	Marrill MacDonald	Stu Beckett
Morgan-Dollar Motorsports	Chevrolet Silverado	46	Rob Morgan	David Dollar	Tim Murphy
Petty Enterprises	Dodge Ram	43	Steve Grissom	Richard Petty	Fred Wanke
Phelon Motorsports	Ford F-150	66	Rick Carelli	Dale Phelon	Roland Wlodyka
Roush Racing	Ford F-150	50	Greg Biffle	Jack Roush	Randy Goss
Roush Racing	Ford F-150	99	Kurt Busch (R)	Jack Roush	Matt Chambers
SealMaster Racing	Chevrolet Silverado	88	Terry Cook 23	Duke Thorson	Jerry Cook
SealMaster Racing	Chevrolet Silverado	88	Matt Crafton 1	Duke Thorson	Jerry Cook
Spears Motorsports	Chevrolet Silverado	75	Marty Houston	Wayne Spears	Freddy Fryar
Team Menard	Chevrolet Silverado	3	Bryan Reffner	John Menard Jr.	Les Back
Team Rensi Motorsports	Chevrolet Silverado	16	Jimmy Hensley	Ed Rensi	Troy Selberg
Ultra Motorsports	Ford F-150	2	Mike Wallace	Marlene Smith	Tim Kohuth

=== Partial schedule ===
Team	Truck(s)	#	Driver(s)	Listed owner(s)	Crew chief
Billy Ballew Motorsports	Ford F-150	15	Barry Bodine 3	Billy Ballew	Richie Wauters
Billy Ballew Motorsports	Ford F-150	15	Geoff Bodine 1	Billy Ballew	Richie Wauters
Billy Ballew Motorsports	Ford F-150	15	Bobby Gill 3	Billy Ballew	Richie Wauters
Black Tip Racing	Chevrolet Silverado	69	Jeff Spraker 1	Andy Campbell	N/A
Black Tip Racing	Chevrolet Silverado	69	Michael Dokken 1	Andy Campbell	N/A
Black Tip Racing	Chevrolet Silverado	69	Ron Barfield Jr. 1	Andy Campbell	N/A
Black Tip Racing	Chevrolet Silverado	69	Morgan Shepherd 1	Andy Campbell	N/A
Bobby Hamilton Racing	Dodge Ram	4	Bobby Hamilton 5	Bobby Hamilton	Tim Fowlkes
Bobby Hamilton Racing	Dodge Ram	4	Donny Morelock 6	Bobby Hamilton	Tim Fowlkes
Bobby Hamilton Racing	Dodge Ram	4	Chad Chaffin 1	Bobby Hamilton	Tim Fowlkes
Brevak Racing	Ford F-150	31	John Young (R) 8	Shelly Brevak	Jerry Hand
Brevak Racing	Ford F-150	31	Sean Woodside 2	Shelly Brevak	Jerry Hand
Brevak Racing	Ford F-150	31	Stevie Reeves 3	Shelly Brevak	Jerry Hand
Brevak Racing	Ford F-150	31	Robbie Thompson 1	Shelly Brevak	Jerry Hand
Brevak Racing	Ford F-150	31	Tony Ave 1	Shelly Brevak	Jerry Hand
Brevak Racing	Ford F-150	31	Brian Rose 1	Shelly Brevak	Jerry Hand
Brevak Racing	Ford F-150	31	Larry Gunselman 4	Shelly Brevak	Jerry Hand
Brevak Racing	Ford F-150	31	Scott Riggs 1	Shelly Brevak	Jerry Hand
CJ Racing	Ford F-150	27	Lonnie Rush Jr. 3	Mike Albernaz	Mike Albernaz
CJ Racing	Ford F-150	27	Andy Genzman 9	Mike Albernaz	Mike Albernaz
CJ Racing	Ford F-150	27	Jeff McClure 2	Mike Albernaz	Mike Albernaz
CJ Racing	Ford F-150	27	Jeff Beck 2	Mike Albernaz	Mike Albernaz
CJ Racing	Ford F-150	27	Ricky Sanders 4	Mike Albernaz	Mike Albernaz
Conely Racing	Chevrolet Silverado	7	Morgan Shepherd 2	John Conely	John Conely
Conely Racing	Chevrolet Silverado	7	Stan Boyd 2	John Conely	John Conely
Conely Racing	Chevrolet Silverado	7	David Starr 8	John Conely	John Conely
Conely Racing	Chevrolet Silverado	7	Dane Pitarresi 1	John Conely	John Conely
Conely Racing	Chevrolet Silverado	7	Ron Fellows 1	John Conely	John Conely
Conely Racing	Chevrolet Silverado	7	Randy Renfrow 1	John Conely	John Conely
Hover Motorsports	Ford F1-50	80	Gary Bradberry 1	Stan Hover	N/A
Hover Motorsports	Ford F1-50	80	Morgan Shepherd 3	Stan Hover	N/A
Jim Rosemblum Racing	Chevrolet Silverado	28	Kenny Allen 2	Jim Rosemblum	N/A
Jim Rosemblum Racing	Chevrolet Silverado	28	Conrad Burr 2	Jim Rosemblum	N/A
Joe Gibbs Racing	Chevrolet Silverado	20	Jason Small 1	Joe Gibbs	Clinton Cram
Joe Gibbs Racing	Chevrolet Silverado	20	Coy Gibbs (R) 12	Joe Gibbs	Clinton Cram
Joe Gibbs Racing	Chevrolet Silverado	20	J. D. Gibbs 5	Joe Gibbs	Clinton Cram
Ken Schrader Racing	Chevrolet Silverado	52	Lyndon Amick 2	Ken Schrader	Wally Brown
Ken Schrader Racing	Chevrolet Silverado	52	Ken Schrader 5	Ken Schrader	Wally Brown
Long Brothers Racing	Ford F-150	84	Donnie Neuenberger 1	Robert Long	N/A
Long Brothers Racing	Ford F-150	84	Scott Riggs 1	Robert Long	N/A
Long Brothers Racing	Ford F-150	84	Chad Chaffin 1	Robert Long	N/A
Long Brothers Racing	Ford F-150	84	Elliott Sadler 1	Robert Long	N/A
Mansion Motorsports	Ford F-150	91	Carl Long 2	Thee Dixon	Keith Montgomery
Liberty Racing	Ford F-150	98	Kenny Martin (R) 8	Angelo Martin	Bud Haefele
Liberty Racing	Ford F-150	98	Brian Rose 1	Angelo Martin	Bud Haefele
MB Motorsports	Ford F-150	26	Jamie McMurray (R) 10	Mike Mittler	Mike Mittler
MB Motorsports	Ford F-150	26	Tony Roper 5	Mike Mittler	Mike Mittler
McCray Racing	Dodge Ram	42	Jimmy Kitchens 1	Rick McCray	N/A
McGlynn Racing	Chevrolet Silverado	00	Ryan McGlynn 20	Raynard McGlynn	Bob Kocher
M-R Motorsports	Chevrolet Silverado	04	Brad Teague 1	William Rose	N/A
M-R Motorsports	Chevrolet Silverado	04	Jason Roche 1	William Rose	N/A
M-R Motorsports	Chevrolet Silverado	04	Tim Martin 1	William Rose	N/A
Nessa Motorsports	Ford F-150	8	Ron Barfield Jr. 3	Tammy Provence	N/A
Nessa Motorsports	Ford F-150	28	Ron Barfield Jr. 3	Tammy Provence	N/A
Nessa Motorsports	Ford F-150	28	David Starr 1	Tammy Provence	N/A
Petty Enterprises	Dodge Ram	44	Boris Said 1	Maurice Petty	N/A
Petty Enterprises	Dodge Ram	44	Mark Petty 7	Maurice Petty	N/A
Raptor Performance Motorsports	Ford F-150	9	Lance Hooper (R) 13	Marty Walsh	N/A
Raptor Performance Motorsports	Ford F-150	9	Brian Winters 1	Marty Walsh	N/A
Raptor Performance Motorsports	Ford F-150	9	Ricky Sanders 2	Marty Walsh	N/A
Raptor Performance Motorsports	Ford F-150	9	Tom Boston 2	Marty Walsh	N/A
Raptor Performance Motorsports	Ford F-150	9	Ryan McGlynn 1	Marty Walsh	N/A
Raptor Performance Motorsports	Ford F-150	9	Jason Thom 1	Marty Walsh	N/A
Raptor Performance Motorsports	Ford F-150	9	Jason Beck 3	Marty Walsh	N/A
Ultra Motorsports	Ford F-150	5	Jason Leffler (R) 1	Marlene Smith	N/A
Ultra Motorsports	Ford F-150	5	Eric Norris 1	Marlene Smith	N/A

== Schedule ==
No.	Race title	Track	Date
1	Daytona 250	Daytona International Speedway, Daytona Beach	February 18
2	Florida Dodge Dealers 400K	Homestead-Miami Speedway, Homestead	February 26
3	Chevy Trucks NASCAR 150	Phoenix International Raceway, Phoenix	March 18
4	Dodge California 250	Mesa Marin Raceway, Bakersfield	March 26
5	NAPA 250	Martinsville Speedway, Ridgeway	April 10
6	Line-X 225	Portland International Raceway, Portland	April 22
7	Ram Tough 200	Gateway International Raceway, Madison	May 7
8	Quaker State 200	Memphis International Raceway, Millington	May 13
9	Grainger.com 200	Pikes Peak International Raceway, Fountain	May 21
10	Sears 200	Evergreen Speedway, Monroe	June 3
11	Pronto Auto Parts 400K	Texas Motor Speedway, Fort Worth	June 9
12	Kroger 225	Kentucky Speedway, Sparta	June 17
13	Bully Hill Vineyards 150	Watkins Glen International, Watkins Glen	June 24
14	Sears DieHard 200	The Milwaukee Mile, West Allis	July 1
15	thatlook.com 200	New Hampshire International Speedway, Loudon	July 8
16	Chevy Silverado 200	Nazareth Speedway, Nazareth	July 15
17	Michigan 200	Michigan International Speedway, Brooklyn	July 22
18	Power Stroke Diesel 200	Indianapolis Raceway Park, Brownsburg	August 3
19	Federated Auto Parts 250	Nashville Speedway USA, Lebanon	August 12
20	Sears Craftsman 175	Chicago Motor Speedway, Cicero	August 27
21	Kroger 200	Richmond International Raceway, Richmond	September 7
22	MBNA e-commerce 200	Dover International Speedway, Dover	September 22
23	O'Reilly 400	Texas Motor Speedway, Fort Worth	October 13
24	Motorola 200	California Speedway, Fontana	October 28

== Races ==
=== Daytona 250 ===
The inaugural Daytona 250 was held on February 18 at Daytona International Speedway. Joe Ruttman won the pole.

Top ten results

1. #2 - Mike Wallace
2. #99 - Kurt Busch
3. #60 - Andy Houston
4. #88 - Terry Cook
5. #98 - Kenny Martin
6. #72 - Randy MacDonald
7. #66 - Rick Carelli
8. #1 - Dennis Setzer
9. #84 - Donnie Neuenberger
10. #43 - Steve Grissom

Failed to qualify: Brad Teague (#04), Lance Hooper (#9), Rick Ware (#51), Peter Gibbons (#01), Carl Long (#91), Ricky Sanders (#19), Brian Sockwell (#54), Matt Mullins (#09), Kenny Allen (#28), Wayne Edwards (#93), Jeff Spraker (#69), Gary Bradberry (#80), Tom Powers (#5), Tommy Croft (#71), Joe Buford (#11), Phil Bonifield (#23)

- During this race, Geoff Bodine was involved in a serious accident that collected many trucks and damaged the fence, causing his truck to flip over several times and become engulfed in flames. He survived the accident.
- Also, in this race, Kurt Busch makes his NASCAR Craftsman Truck Series debut, and ended up finishing second to Mike Wallace.

=== Florida Dodge Dealers 400K ===
The Florida Dodge Dealers 400K was held February 26 at Homestead-Miami Speedway. Joe Ruttman won the pole.

Top ten results

1. #60 - Andy Houston
2. #2 - Mike Wallace
3. #24 - Jack Sprague
4. #18 - Joe Ruttman
5. #50 - Greg Biffle
6. #25 - Randy Tolsma
7. #14 - Rick Crawford
8. #88 - Terry Cook
9. #99 - Kurt Busch
10. #75 - Marty Houston

Failed to qualify: none

=== Chevy Trucks NASCAR 150 ===
The Chevy Trucks NASCAR 150 was held March 18 at Phoenix International Raceway. Joe Ruttman won the pole.

Top ten results

1. #18 - Joe Ruttman
2. #24 - Jack Sprague
3. #60 - Andy Houston
4. #99 - Kurt Busch
5. #50 - Greg Biffle
6. #1 - Dennis Setzer
7. #43 - Steve Grissom
8. #41 - Randy Renfrow
9. #2 - Mike Wallace
10. #14 - Rick Crawford

Failed to qualify: Milan Garrett (#85), Bobby Hillis (#05)

=== Dodge California 250 ===
The Dodge California 250 was held March 26 at Mesa Marin Raceway. Mike Wallace won the pole.

Top ten results

1. #2 - Mike Wallace
2. #99 - Kurt Busch
3. #24 - Jack Sprague
4. #43 - Steve Grissom
5. #41 - Randy Renfrow
6. #3 - Bryan Reffner
7. #88 - Terry Cook
8. #1 - Dennis Setzer
9. #14 - Rick Crawford
10. #60 - Andy Houston

Failed to qualify: Rick Ware (#51), Milan Garrett (#85)

=== NAPA 250 ===
The NAPA 250 was held April 10 at Martinsville Speedway. Mike Wallace won the pole.

Top ten results

1. #4 - Bobby Hamilton*
2. #2 - Mike Wallace
3. #24 - Jack Sprague
4. #1 - Dennis Setzer
5. #43 - Steve Grissom
6. #18 - Joe Ruttman
7. #25 - Randy Tolsma
8. #3 - Bryan Reffner
9. #84 - Scott Riggs
10. #16 - Jimmy Hensley

Failed to qualify: Wayne Edwards (#91), Carl Long (#91), Andy Genzman (#27), Billy Venturini (#83), Rick Ware (#51), Tom Bambard (#30), Paul Carman (#08), Bobby Norfleet (#34)

- This was Hamilton's first career Truck Series victory.

=== Line-X 225 ===
The Line-X 225 was held April 22 at Portland International Raceway. Greg Biffle won the pole.

Top ten results

1. #60 - Andy Houston
2. #1 - Dennis Setzer
3. #24 - Jack Sprague
4. #2 - Mike Wallace
5. #14 - Rick Crawford
6. #16 - Jimmy Hensley
7. #3 - Bryan Reffner
8. #43 - Steve Grissom
9. #75 - Marty Houston
10. #31 - John Young

Failed to qualify: none

- Thirty-three drivers qualified for this race, 1 short of the usual 34.
- Two African-American drivers ran in this race, the first time in a national series: Bobby Norfleet and Bill Lester. Lester ran the entire race and finished 24th. Norfleet, who qualified 11 miles per hour slower than the pole and was black flagged three times for failing to maintain a reasonable pace, was credited with a 32nd-place finish.

=== Ram Tough 200 ===
The Ram Tough 200 was held May 7 at Gateway International Raceway. Greg Biffle won the pole.

Top ten results

1. #24 - Jack Sprague
2. #16 - Jimmy Hensley
3. #25 - Randy Tolsma
4. #50 - Greg Biffle
5. #18 - Joe Ruttman
6. #43 - Steve Grissom
7. #2 - Mike Wallace
8. #3 - Bryan Reffner
9. #88 - Terry Cook
10. #41 - Randy Renfrow

Failed to qualify: Morgan Shepherd (#23), Wayne Edwards (#93), Rick Ware (#51) Stan Boyd (#89), Steve Stevenson (#11)

=== Quaker State 200 ===
The Quaker State 200 was held May 13 at Memphis Motorsports Park. Bobby Hamilton won the pole.

Top ten results

1. #24 - Jack Sprague
2. #50 - Greg Biffle
3. #1 - Dennis Setzer
4. #43 - Steve Grissom
5. #14 - Rick Crawford
6. #25 - Randy Tolsma
7. #3 - Bryan Reffner
8. #98 - Kenny Martin
9. #16 - Jimmy Hensley

Failed to qualify: Stan Boyd (#89), R. D. Smith (#79), Patrick Lawler (#38), Tom Powers (#5), Ricky Sanders (#19), Thomas Boston (#81), Phil Bonifield (#23), Paul Carman (#08)

=== Grainger.com 200 ===
The Grainger.com 200 was held May 21 at Pikes Peak International Raceway. Andy Houston won the pole.

Top ten results

1. #50 - Greg Biffle
2. #99 - Kurt Busch
3. #60 - Andy Houston
4. #24 - Jack Sprague
5. #1 - Dennis Setzer
6. #17 - Ricky Hendrick
7. #41 - Randy Renfrow
8. #3 - Bryan Reffner
9. #86 - Scott Riggs
10. #75 - Marty Houston

Failed to qualify: Bobby Norfleet (#34)

=== Sears 200 ===
The Sears 200 was held June 3 at Evergreen Speedway. Joe Ruttman won the pole.

Top ten results

1. #24 - Jack Sprague
2. #25 - Randy Tolsma
3. #18 - Joe Ruttman
4. #50 - Greg Biffle
5. #99 - Kurt Busch
6. #1 - Dennis Setzer
7. #66 - Rick Carelli
8. #60 - Andy Houston
9. #86 - Scott Riggs
10. #3 - Bryan Reffner

Failed to qualify: Jason Roche (#04), Bobby Hillis (#05), Bobby Norfleet (#34)

=== Pronto Auto Parts 400K ===
The Pronto Auto Parts 400K was held June 9 at Texas Motor Speedway. Greg Biffle won the pole.

Top ten results

1. #50 - Greg Biffle
2. #2 - Mike Wallace
3. #25 - Randy Tolsma
4. #60 - Andy Houston
5. #3 - Bryan Reffner
6. #99 - Kurt Busch
7. #75 - Marty Houston
8. #14 - Rick Crawford
9. #73 - B. A. Wilson
10. #86 - Scott Riggs

Failed to qualify: none

=== Kroger 225 ===
The inaugural Kroger 225 was held June 17 at Kentucky Speedway. Bryan Reffner won the pole.

Top ten results

1. #50 - Greg Biffle
2. #24 - Jack Sprague
3. #2 - Mike Wallace
4. #75 - Marty Houston
5. #3 - Bryan Reffner
6. #25 - Randy Tolsma
7. #66 - Rick Carelli
8. #46 - Rob Morgan
9. #60 - Andy Houston
10. #14 - Rick Crawford

Failed to qualify: Michael Dokken (#17)

=== Bully Hill Vineyards 150 ===
The Bully Hill Vineyards 150 was held June 24 at Watkins Glen International. Greg Biffle won the pole.

Top ten results

1. #50 - Greg Biffle
2. #99 - Kurt Busch
3. #7 - Ron Fellows
4. #2 - Mike Wallace
5. #24 - Jack Sprague
6. #60 - Andy Houston
7. #1 - Dennis Setzer
8. #12 - Carlos Contreras
9. #14 - Rick Crawford
10. #25 - Randy Tolsma

Failed to qualify: Donny Morelock (#4), Jason Thom (#37)

- The race was the last Truck race on a road course until 2013, when the Chevrolet Silverado 250 was held at Canadian Tire Motorsport Park.
- The Truck Series would not return to Watkins Glen until 2021.

=== Sears DieHard 200 ===
The Sears DieHard 200 was held July 1 at The Milwaukee Mile. Kurt Busch won the pole.

Top ten results

1. #99 - Kurt Busch*
2. #25 - Randy Tolsma
3. #50 - Greg Biffle
4. #43 - Steve Grissom
5. #2 - Andy Houston
6. #75 - Marty Houston
7. #90 - Lance Norick
8. #24 - Jack Sprague
9. #86 - Scott Riggs
10. #3 - Bryan Reffner

Failed to qualify: none

- This was Busch's first career NASCAR victory, coming after finishing 2nd four previous times.

=== thatlook.com 200 ===
The thatlook.com 200 was held July 8 at New Hampshire International Speedway. Joe Ruttman won the pole.

Top ten results

1. #99 - Kurt Busch
2. #2 - Mike Wallace
3. #25 - Randy Tolsma
4. #50 - Greg Biffle
5. #60 - Andy Houston
6. #86 - Scott Riggs
7. #17 - Ricky Hendrick
8. #51 - Michael Dokken
9. #52 - Ken Schrader
10. #75 - Marty Houston

Failed to qualify: none

=== Chevy Silverado 200 ===
The Chevy Silverado 200 was held July 15 at Nazareth Speedway. Joe Ruttman won the pole.

Top ten results

1. #1 - Dennis Setzer
2. #18 - Joe Ruttman
3. #50 - Greg Biffle
4. #43 - Steve Grissom
5. #24 - Jack Sprague
6. #88 - Terry Cook
7. #16 - Jimmy Hensley
8. #66 - Rick Carelli
9. #3 - Bryan Reffner
10. #2 - Mike Wallace

Failed to qualify: none

=== Michigan 200 ===
The Michigan 200 was held July 22 at Michigan International Speedway. Jamie McMurray won the pole.

Top ten results

1. #50 - Greg Biffle
2. #99 - Kurt Busch
3. #2 - Mike Wallace
4. #60 - Andy Houston
5. #1 - Dennis Setzer
6. #41 - Jamie McMurray
7. #14 - Rick Crawford
8. #75 - Marty Houston
9. #29 - Terry Cook
10. #25 - Randy Tolsma

Failed to qualify: Ricky Sanders (#19)

=== Power Stroke Diesel 200 ===
The Power Stroke Diesel 200 was held August 3 at Indianapolis Raceway Park. Joe Ruttman won the pole.

Top ten results

1. #18 - Joe Ruttman
2. #52 - Lyndon Amick
3. #41 - Jamie McMurray
4. #2 - Mike Wallace
5. #50 - Greg Biffle
6. #99 - Kurt Busch
7. #1 - Dennis Setzer
8. #3 - Bryan Reffner
9. #16 - Jimmy Hensley
10. #25 - Randy Tolsma

Failed to qualify: Steve Prescott (#03), Coy Gibbs (#20), Phil Bonifield (#23), Morgan Shepherd (#7), Ronnie Hornaday (#92), Donny Morelock (#4), Ryan McGlynn (#00), Wes Russell (#47), Wayne Edwards (#93), Tony Ave (#31), Jason Thom (#37), Loni Richardson (#0)

=== Federated Auto Parts 250 ===
The Federated Auto Parts 250 was held August 12 at Nashville Speedway USA. Jamie McMurray won the pole.

Top ten results

1. #25 - Randy Tolsma*
2. #1 - Dennis Setzer
3. #84 - Chad Chaffin
4. #18 - Joe Ruttman
5. #43 - Steve Grissom
6. #60 - Andy Houston
7. #86 - Scott Riggs
8. #3 - Bryan Reffner
9. #17 - Ricky Hendrick
10. #14 - Rick Crawford

Failed to qualify: Brian Rose (#31), Ryan McGlynn (#00), Bobby Gill (#15), Ricky Sanders (#19), Wayne Edwards (#93), Jeff Beck (#27), Conrad Burr (#28), R. D. Smith (#79), Phil Bonifield (#23), Loni Richardson (#0), Tim Martin (#04)

- This was Tolsma's last Truck Series victory.

=== Sears Craftsman 175 ===
The inaugural Sears Craftsman 175 was held August 27 at Chicago Motor Speedway. Joe Ruttman won the pole.

Top ten results

1. #18 - Joe Ruttman
2. #50 - Greg Biffle
3. #2 - Mike Wallace
4. #60 - Andy Houston
5. #66 - Rick Carelli
6. #41 - Jamie McMurray
7. #3 - Bryan Reffner
8. #88 - Terry Cook
9. #73 - B.A. Wilson
10. #25 - Randy Tolsma

Failed to qualify: Wayne Edwards (#93), Stan Boyd (#89), Brad Payne (#33), Donnie Neuenberger (#21), Jay Stewart (#30), Phil Bonifield (#23), Brendan Gaughan (#62)

=== Kroger 200 ===
The Kroger 200 was held September 7 at Richmond International Raceway. Kurt Busch won the pole.

Top ten results

1. #66 - Rick Carelli*
2. #50 - Greg Biffle
3. #99 - Kurt Busch
4. #18 - Joe Ruttman
5. #86 - Scott Riggs
6. #24 - Jack Sprague
7. #52 - Ken Schrader
8. #1 - Dennis Setzer
9. #43 - Steve Grissom
10. #4 - Bobby Hamilton

Failed to qualify: Coy Gibbs (#20), Ricky Hendrick (#17), Morgan Shepherd (#80), Darren Shaw (#11), J. D. Gibbs (#48), Steve Prescott (#03), Brian Sockwell (#54), Brian Rose (#98), Wayne Edwards (#93), Bill Lester (#23), Jim Mills (#30), Loni Richardson (#0), Scotty Sands (#47)

- This would be Carelli's last career NASCAR victory, and his first since his near-fatal accident at Memphis the previous year. This was also the only NASCAR victory for Phelon Motorsports.

=== MBNA e-commerce 200 ===
The inaugural MBNA e-commerce 200 was held September 22 at Dover International Speedway. Kurt Busch won the pole.

Top ten results

1. #99 - Kurt Busch
2. #50 - Greg Biffle*
3. #14 - Rick Crawford
4. #60 - Andy Houston
5. #52 - Ken Schrader
6. #41 - Jamie McMurray
7. #75 - Marty Houston
8. #66 - Rick Carelli
9. #1 - Dennis Setzer
10. #12 - Carlos Contreras

Failed to qualify: Ron Barfield Jr. (#97), Kenny Martin (#98), Morgan Shepherd (#80), Larry Gunselman (#31), Tony Roper (#26), Ricky Sanders (#19), Ryan McGlynn (#00), Jerry Miller (#32), Michael Hamby (#0), Donnie Neuenberger (#84), Jim Mills (#30)

- Biffle's 2nd-place finish extended his points lead to 290 points over Mike Wallace. Biffle could mathematically win the championship if he finishes 27th or better at Texas.

=== O'Reilly 400 ===
The O'Reilly 400 was held October 13 at Texas Motor Speedway. Bryan Reffner won the pole. On lap 31, Tony Roper made contact with Steve Grissom, sending Roper's truck into the front stretch wall at high-speed. Roper was taken to a nearby hospital, where he died the next day.

Top ten results

1. #3 - Bryan Reffner*
2. #60 - Andy Houston
3. #99 - Kurt Busch
4. #16 - Jimmy Hensley
5. #1 - Dennis Setzer
6. #14 - Rick Crawford
7. #25 - Randy Tolsma
8. #17 - Ricky Hendrick
9. #66 - Rick Carelli
10. #44 - Mark Petty

Failed to qualify: Morgan Shepherd (#80), Bobby Dotter (#45), Wayne Edwards (#93), Ron Barfield Jr. (#97), Carl Long (#32), Jay Stewart (#33), Richie Hearn (#23), Gene Christensen (#92)

- Despite crashing out and finishing 25th, Greg Biffle clinched the championship with 1 race remaining. It was Jack Roush's first NASCAR championship of any kind. Biffle would suffer a cracked rib and bruised sternum in his accident.
- This was Reffner's only Truck Series victory, and the only NASCAR victory for Team Menard.
- This would be the final Truck race without Matt Crafton until 2026.

=== Motorola 200 ===
The Motorola 200 was held October 28 at California Speedway. Kurt Busch won the pole.

Top ten results

1. #99 - Kurt Busch
2. #60 - Andy Houston
3. #18 - Joe Ruttman
4. #24 - Jack Sprague
5. #50 - Greg Biffle
6. #3 - Bryan Reffner
7. #29 - Terry Cook
8. #75 - Marty Houston
9. #88 - Matt Crafton*
10. #16 - Jimmy Hensley

Failed to qualify: Tom Powers (#5), Rick Ware (#51), Michael Hamby (#0)

- First career start for eventual three-time series champion Matt Crafton.

== Full Drivers' Championship ==
(key) Bold – Pole position awarded by time. Italics – Pole position set by owner's points. * – Most laps led.

Pos	Driver	DAY	HOM	PHO	MMR	MAR	PIR	GTY	MEM	PPR	EVG	TEX	KEN	GLN	MLW	NHA	NZH	MCH	IRP	NSV	CIC	RCH	DOV	TEX	CAL	Points
1	Greg Biffle	11	5*	5	12	14	**13**	**4**	2	1*	4	**1***	1*	**1***	3	4	3	1*	5	14	2*	2	2	25	5	3826
2	Kurt Busch **(R)**	2	9	4	2	23	11	21	13*	2	5	6	29	2	**1***	1	14	2	6	12	19	**3***	**1**	3	**1**	3596
3	Andy Houston	3	1	3	10	11	1	24	15	**3**	8	4	9	6	5	5	11	4	26	6	4	25	4	2	2*	3566
4	Mike Wallace	1*	2	9	**1**	**2**	4	7	4	33	16	2	3	4	22	2	10	3	4	13	3	15	12*	21	32	3450
5	Jack Sprague	33	3	2	3	3	3	1*	1	4	1	28	2	5	8	34	5	13	17	30*	17	6	27	22*	4	3316
6	Joe Ruttman	**19**	**4**	**1***	16	6	12	5	19	22	**3**	26	25	15	24	**12**	**2***	14	**1***	4	**1**	4	17	11	3	3278
7	Dennis Setzer	8	32	6	8	4	2*	16	3	5	6	33	12	7	26	33	1	5	7	2	29	8	9	5	11	3214
8	Randy Tolsma	15	6	31	25*	7	29	3	7	12	2*	3	6	10	2	3	31	10	10	1	10	34	16	7	20	3157
9	Bryan Reffner	35	30	11	6	8	7	8	8	8	10	5	**5**	13	10	28	9	15	8	8	7	11	29	**1**	6	3153
10	Steve Grissom	10	11	7	4	5	8	6	5	21	26	15	18	12	4	14	4	16	11	5	24	9	13	28	18	3113
11	Rick Crawford	34	7	10	9	15	5	12	6	13	14	8	10	9	14	13	13	7	31	10	28	16	3	6	12	3053
12	Marty Houston	18	10	22	21	19	9	25	17	10	25	7	4	17	6	10	19	8	13	18	20	14	7	19	8	2942
13	Jimmy Hensley	29	12	15	14	10	6	2	10	11	12	12	13	14	12	27	7	12	9	29	25	13	32	4	10	2933
14	Terry Cook	4	8	14	7	30	22	9	31	17	13	19	35	11	21	17	6	9	28	11	8	30	14	17	7	2805
15	Rick Carelli	7	34	26	20	33	17	29	34	20	7	31	7	32	13	11	8	31	24	23	5	1	8	9	21	2606
16	Lance Norick	26	31	28	11	17	28	14	36	26	20	13	11	23	7	32	12	17	18	15	16	18	31	20	27	2430
17	Carlos Contreras **(R)**	13	33	21	27	22	18	18	18	30	19	20		8	11	21	18	20	27	19	15	19	10	15	26	2414
18	Rob Morgan	23	35	12	15	21	27	19	22	28	27	29	8	26	18	23	16	18	33	17	23	20	20	31	13	2353
19	Randy MacDonald	6	20	29	17	32	16	17	25	15	23	25	20	20	23	30	26	27	19	28	31	22	22	14	25	2321
20	Scott Riggs **(R)**					9			12	9	9	10	23	24	9	6	27	11	15	7	30	5	19		16	2078
21	B. A. Wilson	27	19	19	18	16		13	14	14	21	9	14	33	33			32	14	27	9	27	34	27	22	2047
22	Jamie McMurray **(R)**	20	22	33	30			23	20	32		14	17		31			**6**	3	**25**	6	32	6			1679
23	Randy Renfrow	31	25	8	5	13	14	10	30	7	11	37	28	21	15									30		1610
24	Rick Ware **(R)**	DNQ		23	DNQ	DNQ	19	DNQ	21	31	17	18	24	22				26	34	21	21	23		13	DNQ	1585
25	Ryan McGlynn	16	24	34	26	29	33	31	33	23	28	34	30	34	32	18	17	21	DNQ	DNQ	34		DNQ			1581
26	Wayne Edwards **(R)**	DNQ	27	25	34	DNQ		DNQ	23	25		23	32	27	29	19	20	33	DNQ	DNQ	DNQ	DNQ	23	DNQ		1391
27	Coy Gibbs **(R)**					18		32		19			19		28	16	24		DNQ	16	13	DNQ	33	34	29	1226
28	Lance Hooper	DNQ	18	16	31	28	30	20	16	27						29		28	32		33		15			1199
29	David Starr	36			29	20		15	11			11	15				29	29	21	33				12	34	1163
30	Ricky Hendrick									6						7			12	9		DNQ	25	8		846
31	Andy Genzman					DNQ	20	26	26	24	18		26		19	31										780
32	Jim Inglebright			18						18	15					24			16		27				15	742
33	John Young	21	23			24	10	28	24		29	36														720
34	Mark Petty																		22	26	18	33	18	10	14	719
35	Ken Schrader					12										9*						7	5		17	688
36	Ricky Sanders	DNQ							DNQ			30	22					DNQ		DNQ	26	31	DNQ	16		667
37	Kenny Martin **(R)**	5	29	32	33	31		22	9														DNQ			652
38	Tom Carey					35								19		25	25				12	17	30			652
39	Phil Bonifield	DNQ		35	32				DNQ	35	31		33	DNQ			30	34		DNQ	DNQ				36	617
40	Brendan Gaughan			13	13			11			24										DNQ				19	615
41	Mike Cope	12	15	20	22	36	23																			594
42	Bobby Hamilton	30				1*			**29**							20						10				586
43	Michael Dokken		21										DNQ		16	8	15									532
44	Ron Barfield Jr.	17							27				21						20	20			DNQ	DNQ		
45	Brad Bennett		14					34						30		15							21			473
46	Jeff Buck													28					23	DNQ		24	24		33	467
47	Morgan Shepherd	32	17					DNQ											DNQ	32		DNQ	DNQ	DNQ		465
48	Donny Morelock										32			DNQ	27		21	19	DNQ							459
49	J. D. Gibbs								28					31				30		24		DNQ	26			444
50	Brian Sockwell	DNQ				27			35												11	DNQ		24		435
51	Stan Boyd			27	19			DNQ	DNQ				34					25			DNQ				24	432
52	Chris Horn									16		16	36											18		394
53	Steve Prescott										22			29		22			DNQ			DNQ				371
54	Tony Roper																		30	34		21	DNQ	29		356
55	Chad Chaffin																			3	14			33		350
56	Rich Woodland Jr.	14						30										23							35	346
57	Barry Bodine		13	17	23																					330
58	Tom Boston								DNQ					25			22						28			301
59	Patrick Lawler								DNQ			24						22						32		301
60	Donnie Neuenberger	9																			DNQ		DNQ		30	291
61	Larry Gunselman																				32	26	DNQ	26		286
62	Jeff McClure						26					21					23									279
63	Lyndon Amick	22																	2							277
64	Bobby Hillis Jr.			DNQ			31			34	DNQ								DNQ					Wth		266
65	Hermie Sadler																					12	11			262
66	Lonnie Rush Jr.	25	16	36																						258
67	Tommy Croft	DNQ	26									22												36		250
68	R. D. Smith III					26			DNQ											DNQ		28				250
69	Stevie Reeves												27		30			24								246
70	Carl Long	DNQ				DNQ						17												DNQ		241
71	Jay Stewart											35	31								DNQ			DNQ		239
72	Bobby Dotter														17					31				DNQ		231
73	Billy Kann									29		32			25											231
74	Milan Garrett			DNQ	DNQ		21																			207
75	Matt Mullins	DNQ	28	24																						201
76	Tom Powers	DNQ						27	DNQ																DNQ	193
77	Jason Thom													DNQ					DNQ	22						183
78	Doug George							33			QL		16													179
79	Derrike Cope																							23	28	173
80	Ron Fellows													3												165
81	Sean Woodside			30	24																					164
82	Bobby Norfleet					DNQ	32			Wth	DNQ															156
83	Matt Crafton																								9	138
84	Conrad Burr					25														DNQ						128
85	Boris Said						15																			123
86	Bill Lester						24															DNQ				122
87	Jerry Miller																28						DNQ			116
88	Andy Santerre													16												115
89	Charles Morgan Jr.													18												109
90	Brad Mueller														20											103
91	Anthony Lazzaro																				22					97
92	Brian Rose																			DNQ		DNQ				95
93	Ronnie Hornaday III																		DNQ						23	94
94	Geoff Bodine	24																								91
95	Dane Pitarresi						25																			88
96	Robbie Thompson															26										85
97	Jimmy Kitchens	28																								84
98	Loni Richardson																		DNQ	DNQ		DNQ				84
99	Kenny Allen	DNQ	36																							83
100	Mike Hamby																						DNQ		DNQ	83
101	Joel White											27														82
102	Jason Small				28														25							79
103	Jason Leffler																		29							76
104	Elliott Sadler																					29				76
105	Brian Winters										30															73
106	Chuck Hossfeld																								31	70
107	Bobby Gill					34			32											DNQ						66
108	Paul Carman					DNQ			DNQ																	65
109	Jason Roche										DNQ															64
110	Eric Norris																							35		58
111	Jim Mills																					DNQ	DNQ			56
112	Brad Payne																				DNQ					55
113	Brad Teague	DNQ																								52
114	Darren Shaw																					DNQ				49
115	Steve Stevenson							DNQ																		46
116	Peter Gibbons	DNQ																								43
117	Billy Venturini					DNQ																				43
118	Wes Russell Jr.																		DNQ							40
119	Tom Bambard					DNQ																				37
120	Tony Ave																		DNQ							34
121	Richie Hearn																							DNQ		34
122	Gene Christensen																							DNQ		31
123	Tim Martin																			DNQ						28
124	Bobby Hamilton Jr.																			DNQ						25
125	Scotty Sands																					DNQ				25
126	Jeff Spraker	DNQ																								22
127	Gary Bradberry	DNQ																								19
128	Joe Buford	DNQ																								7
	Darren Law													QL												
Pos	Driver	DAY	HOM	PHO	MMR	MAR	PIR	GTY	MEM	PPR	EVG	TEX	KEN	GLN	MLW	NHA	NZH	MCH	IRP	NSV	CIC	RCH	DOV	TEX	CAL	Points

== Rookie of the Year ==
Kurt Busch, winner of Roush Racing's first Gong Show, took home Rookie of the Year honors in 2000, winning four races and finishing second in points. The top runner-up was Carlos Contreras, the first Mexican to compete full-time in the Truck Series. Scott Riggs started the year with several underfunded teams, before becoming Contreras' teammate at Impact Motorsports. Rick Ware, Wayne Edwards, Kenny Martin, and Coy Gibbs all declared for ROTY but struggled in qualifying, while Mark Petty made a delayed attempt at the award. Businessman Donny Morelock and Coy's brother J. D. rounded out the rookie class of 2000.

== See also ==
- 2000 NASCAR Winston Cup Series
- 2000 NASCAR Busch Series
- 2000 ARCA Bondo/Mar-Hyde Series
- 2000 NASCAR Goody's Dash Series
