= Loni Richardson =

American racing driver (born 1970)

- Born: November 11, 1970 (age 56); Paris, Texas, U.S.

NASCAR FedEx Freight Truck Series career
- 19 races run over 5 years
- 2004 position: 56th
- Best finish: 56th (2004)
- First race: 2001 Florida Dodge Dealers 400K (Homestead-Miami)
- Last race: 2004 American Racing Wheels 200 (California)
Wins	Top tens	Poles
0	0	0
- Statistics up to date as of November 11, 2020.

Loni Richardson (born November 11, 1970) is an American former stock car racing driver from Paris, Texas. Richardson competed in 19 NASCAR Craftsman Truck Series races between 2001 and 2004, earning a best finish of 20th at Kentucky Speedway in 2003.

== Motorsports career results ==
=== NASCAR ===
(key) (Bold – Pole position awarded by qualifying time. Italics – Pole position earned by points standings or practice time. * – Most laps led.)

==== Craftsman Truck Series ====
NASCAR Craftsman Truck Series results
Year	Team	No.	Make	1	2	3	4	5	6	7	8	9	10	11	12	13	14	15	16	17	18	19	20	21	22	23	24	25	NCTC	Pts	Ref
2000	Richardson Motorsports	0	Chevy	DAY	HOM	PHO	MMR	MAR	PIR	GTY	MEM	PPR	EVG	TEX	KEN	GLN	MLW	NHA	NZH	MCH	IRP; DNQ	NSV; DNQ	CIC	RCH; DNQ	DOV	TEX	CAL		N/A	0	
2001	Team 23 Racing	23	Chevy	DAY	HOM; 31	MMR; 34	MAR																						57th	326	
2001	Richardson Motorsports	0	Chevy					GTY; 28	DAR	PPR	DOV	TEX	MEM	MLW	KAN; DNQ	KEN	NHA	IRP	NSH	CIC	NZH	RCH	SBO	TEX	LVS				57th	326	
2001	Tagsby Racing	73	Chevy																							PHO; 33	CAL		57th	326	
2002	Tagsby Racing	73	Chevy	DAY	DAR; 36	MAR; 36	GTY; 26	PPR; 36	DOV; DNQ	TEX							IRP; 35	NSH; 27	RCH; DNQ	TEX	SBO								42nd	454	
2002	Richardson Motorsports	0	Chevy								MEM; DNQ	MLW; DNQ	KAN; DNQ	KEN; DNQ	NHA	MCH						LVS; 33	CAL	PHO; DNQ	HOM; DNQ				42nd	454	
2003	Richardson Motorsports	0	Chevy	DAY	DAR	MMR	MAR	CLT	DOV	TEX	MEM	MLW	KAN	KEN; 20	GTW	MCH; 21	IRP	NSH	BRI	RCH	NHA	CAL; 36	LVS; DNQ	SBO	TEX; DNQ	MAR	PHO	HOM	73rd	258	
2004	Richardson Motorsports	0	Chevy	DAY; DNQ	ATL; DNQ	MAR	MFD	CLT	DOV	TEX; 34	MEM	MLW	KAN	KEN	GTW	MCH; 34	IRP	NSH; 35	BRI; DNQ	RCH	NHA; 36	LVS; DNQ	CAL; 36	TEX; DNQ	MAR	PHO	DAR	HOM	56th	290	
