= David Dollar =

American economist (1954–2023)

- Born: November 21, 1954; St. Louis, Missouri, U.S.
- Died: October 6, 2023 (aged 68); Baltimore, Maryland, U.S.
- Other name: 杜大伟
- Education: Dartmouth College (BA), New York University (PhD)
- Occupation: Economist
- Employer: Brookings Institution
- Spouse: Paige Whitley
- Children: 2

David Dollar (November 21, 1954 – October 8, 2023) was an American economist and China scholar who served as a senior fellow at the Brookings Institution's John L. Thornton China Center between July 2017 and October 2023. His research focused on economic reform in China and US-China economic relations. He hosted Brookings' "Dollar and Sense" trade podcast.

== Early life and education ==
David Dollar was born on November 21, 1954. Originally from St. Louis, Missouri, he graduated with a BA in Chinese History and Language from Dartmouth College in 1975 and a PhD in economics from NYU in 1984. Subsequently, he joined UCLA as an assistant professor in the economics department.

== Career ==
Between 2009 and 2013 Dollar served as the U.S. Treasury Department's Economic and Financial Emissary to China. Prior to that he was the World Bank's country director for China and Mongolia.

== Publications ==
=== Articles ===
Creating a better environment for development as an objective of US policy, Brookings Institution, December 2022 (co-authored with Patricia Kim, Louison Sall, and Jonathan Stromseth)

What China needs to do if it wants to achieve its ambitious economic goals by 2049, CNN, June 21, 2021 (co-authored with Yiping Huang and Yang Yao)

The Foreign Policy Essay: Will China's Economy Dominate the 21st Century? Lawfare, January 4, 2015

The Creation of the Asian Infrastructure Investment Bank Is the Right Move for the Global Economy, NYT, October 22, 2014

Spreading the Wealth, Foreign Affairs, January 1, 2002 (co-authored with Aart Kraay)

=== Others ===
What's the best case scenario for US-China relations? Dollar & Sense Podcast, August 14, 2023 (with Ryan Hass)

== Death ==
Dollar died on October 6, 2023, of complications from a bone marrow transplant, at the age of 68.
