= 2000 Chevy Silverado 200 =

Race details
- Race 16 of 24 in the 2000 NASCAR Craftsman Truck Series season
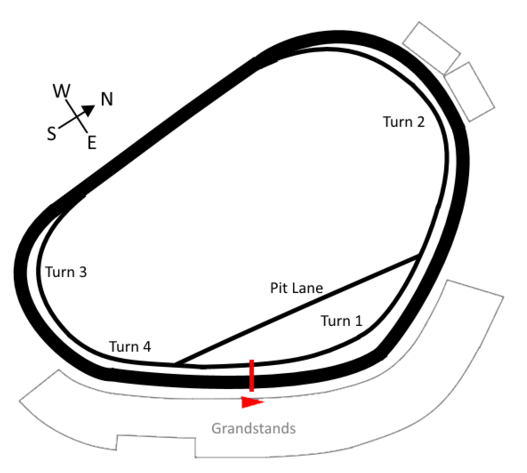
- Date: July 15, 2000
- Location: Nazareth Speedway, Nazareth, Pennsylvania
- Course: Permanent racing facility
- Course length: 1 miles (1.609 km)
- Distance: 200 laps, 200 mi (321.869 km)
- Average speed: 93.083 mph (149.803 km/h)

Pole position
Driver	Joe Ruttman	Bobby Hamilton Racing

Most laps led
Driver	Joe Ruttman	Bobby Hamilton Racing
- Laps: 106

Winner
No. 1	Dennis Setzer	Bob Keselowski Racing

Television in the United States
- Network: CBS
- Announcers: Mike Joy; Buddy Baker; Ned Jarrett

The 2000 Chevy Silverado 200 was a NASCAR Craftsman Truck Series race held on July 15, 2000. It was known for being the last NASCAR race broadcast by CBS. Dennis Setzer led 30 laps and won. Mike Joy, Buddy Baker, and Ned Jarrett called the action.

== Results ==
POS	ST	#	DRIVER	SPONSOR / OWNER	TRUCK	LAPS	MONEY	STATUS	LED	PTS
1	19	1	Dennis Setzer	Mopar Performance (Bob Keselowski)	Dodge	200	49735	running	30	180
2	1	18	Joe Ruttman	Dana Corporation (Bobby Hamilton Racing)	Dodge	200	37675	running	106	180
3	4	50	Greg Biffle	Grainger (Jack Roush)	Ford	200	22980	running	30	170
4	7	43	Steve Grissom	Dodge Motorsports (Petty Enterprises)	Dodge	200	15350	running	2	165
5	9	24	Jack Sprague	GMAC Financial Services (Rick Hendrick)	Chevrolet	200	14705	running	0	155
6	2	88	Terry Cook	PickupTruck.com (Duke Thorson)	Chevrolet	200	11975	running	8	155
7	11	16	Jimmy Hensley	Mobile Max2 (Ed Rensi)	Chevrolet	200	11275	running	0	146
8	3	66	Rick Carelli	Carlin Burners & Controls (Dale Phelon)	Ford	200	11225	running	0	142
9	17	3	Bryan Reffner	Johns Manville / Menards (John Menard)	Chevrolet	200	11150	running	0	138
10	13	2	Mike Wallace	Team ASE Racing (Jim Smith)	Ford	199	11700	running	0	134
11	14	60	Andy Houston	CAT Rental Stores (Mike Addington)	Chevrolet	199	11850	running	0	130
12	10	90	Lance Norick	Aventis Behring (Ron Norick)	Chevrolet	199	10750	running	0	127
13	5	14	Rick Crawford	Milwaukee Electric Tool (Tom Mitchell)	Ford	199	10700	running	19	129
14	15	99	Kurt Busch	Exide Batteries (Jack Roush)	Ford	198	11650	running	0	121
15	21	51	Michael Dokken	Dunlop Golf / Dunhams Sports (Rick Ware)	Chevrolet	198	9900	running	5	123
16	24	46	Rob Morgan	Acxiom (David Dollar)	Ford	198	9900	running	0	115
17	22	00	Ryan McGlynn	Attorney Stephen Fendler (Raynard McGlynn)	Chevrolet	198	9850	running	0	112
18	16	12	Carlos Contreras	Hot Wheels (Russell Kersh)	Dodge	197	9800	running	0	109
19	8	75	Marty Houston	Spears Manufacturing (Wayne Spears)	Chevrolet	170	9750	crash	0	106
20	27	93	Wayne Edwards	WorldBestBuy.com (Lonnie Troxell)	Chevrolet	138	8950	crash	0	103
21	26	4	Donny Morelock	Southern Thunder (Bobby Hamilton Racing)	Dodge	125	8675	clutch	0	100
22	29	9	Tom Boston	Berryman Chem Tool (Marty Walsh)	Ford	85	8650	handling	0	97
23	28	27	Jeff McClure	Hastings Premium Filters (Mike Albernaz)	Ford	72	8625	engine	0	94
24	23	20	Coy Gibbs	MBNA (Joe Gibbs)	Chevrolet	54	8600	engine	0	91
25	18	10	Tom Carey, Jr.	Detroit Locker (Kevin Banning)	Dodge	47	8575	crash	0	88
26	20	72	Randy MacDonald	3M / Greenfield (Doc MacDonald)	Dodge	47	9550	crash	0	85
27	6	86	Scott Riggs	Royal Crown Cola (David Hodson)	Dodge	45	8525	crash	0	82
28	31	32	Jerry Miller	Miller Brothers Garage (Jerry Miller)	Dodge	22	8500	crash	0	79
29	25	81	David Starr	Dunlop Golf / Dunhams Sports (Rick Ware)	Chevrolet	17	8475	vibration	0	0
30	30	23	Phil Bonifield	Red Line Synthetic Oil (Tom Mazzuchi)	Chevrolet	9	8450	clutch	0	73
31	12	25	Randy Tolsma	Citgo Supergard (David Hodson)	Dodge	4	9425	crash	0	70
