= NASCAR Craftsman Truck Series at Richmond Raceway =

NASCAR Truck Series race at Richmond Raceway

Black's Tire 250

NASCAR Craftsman Truck Series
- Venue: Richmond Raceway
- Location: Richmond, Virginia, U.S.
- Corporate sponsor: Black's Tire
- First race: 1995
- Last race: 2026
- Distance: 187.50 miles (301.8 km)
- Laps: 250; Stages 1/2: 70 each Final stage: 110
- Previous names: Fas Mart Supertruck Shootout (1995–1996); Virginia Is For Lovers 200 (1997–1999, 2003); Kroger 200 (2000–2001, 2004); Richmond Is For Lovers 200 (2002); Cheerios Betty Crocker 200 (2005); ToyotaCare 250 (2020–2021); Worldwide Express 250 (2022–2023); Clean Harbors 250 (2024) eero 250 (2025); Black's Tire 250 (2026)

Circuit information
- Surface: Asphalt
- Length: 0.75 mi (1.21 km)
- Turns: 4

The Black's Tire 250 was a NASCAR Craftsman Truck Series at Richmond Raceway. Kaden Honeycutt was the final race winner.

== History ==
The race was initially held from 1995 to 2005 before being removed from the schedule in 2006. In the race's first stint on the Truck Series schedule, it was 200 laps.

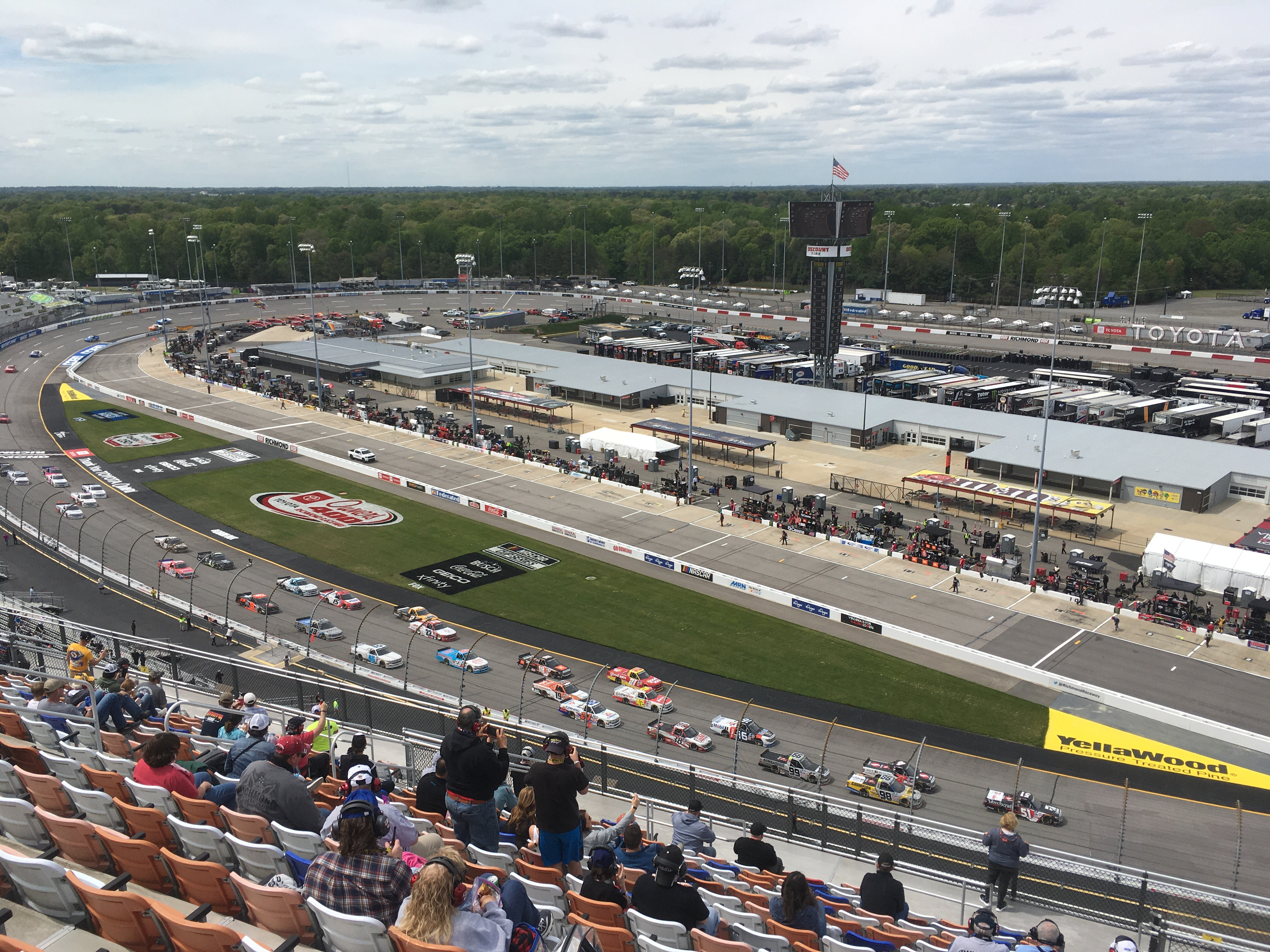
2021 ToyotaCare 250

In 2020, NASCAR removed the spring Truck Series race at Martinsville Speedway in favor of a race at Richmond Raceway in the spring. This schedule change was done in a swap with Martinsville, which previously had two Truck Series races and zero Xfinity Series races and would now have one Truck Series race and one Xfinity Series race. As a result, the Xfinity Series would lose their spring race at Richmond in favor of a race at Martinsville in the fall. In its first year back on the schedule in 2020, the race was extended to 250 laps and the race would be moved to September due to the COVID-19 pandemic. The race would be held as scheduled in April in 2021. In 2022, the race was moved to August. Worldwide Express would become the title sponsor of the race as Toyota moved their title sponsorship to the track's one Xfinity Series race (replacing GoBowling.com as the title sponsor of that race). From 2024–2026, the race was sponsored by different companies including Clean Harbors, eero and Black's Tire.

On August 13, 2026, it was announced that the series would not return to the track in 2027 in favor of the NASCAR O'Reilly Auto Parts Series.

== Past winners ==
Year	Date	No.	Driver	Team	Manufacturer	Race Distance		Race Time	Average Speed (mph)	Report	Ref
Year	Date	No.	Driver	Team	Manufacturer	Laps	Miles (km)	Race Time	Average Speed (mph)	Report	Ref
1995	September 7	5	Terry Labonte	Hendrick Motorsports	Chevrolet	150	112.5 (181.051)	1:25:53	78.595	Report	
1996	September 5	3	Mike Skinner	Richard Childress Racing	Chevrolet	124	93 (149.668)	1:10:56	78.665	Report	
1997	September 4	29	Bob Keselowski	K Automotive Racing	Dodge	200	150 (241.401)	1:26:21	104.227	Report	
1998	September 10	24	Jack Sprague	Hendrick Motorsports	Chevrolet	200	150 (241.401)	1:44:48	85.878	Report	
1999	September 9	50	Greg Biffle	Roush Racing	Ford	196*	147 (236.573)	1:42:28	86.007	Report	
2000	September 7	66	Rick Carelli	Phelon Motorsports	Ford	200	150 (241.401)	1:31:12	98.684	Report	
2001	September 6	24	Jack Sprague	Hendrick Motorsports	Chevrolet	200	150 (241.401)	1:34:04	95.677	Report	
2002	September 5	33	Tony Stewart	Andy Petree Racing	Chevrolet	200	150 (241.401)	1:38:32	91.34	Report	
2003	September 4	33	Tony Stewart	Andy Petree Racing	Chevrolet	200	150 (241.401)	1:38:50	91.062	Report	
2004	September 9	1	Ted Musgrave	Ultra Motorsports	Dodge	209*	156.75 (252.264)	1:51:43	84.186	Report	
2005	September 8	5	Mike Skinner	Bill Davis Racing	Toyota	201*	150.75 (242.608)	1:49:35	82.54	Report	
2006 – 2019	Not held										
2020	September 10*	98	Grant Enfinger	ThorSport Racing	Ford	250	187.50 (301.752)	1:58:59	94.551	Report	
2021	April 17	4	John Hunter Nemechek	Kyle Busch Motorsports	Toyota	250	187.50 (301.752)	2:25:58	77.072	Report	
2022	August 13	18	Chandler Smith	Kyle Busch Motorsports	Toyota	250	187.50 (301.752)	1:56:56	96.209	Report	
2023	July 29	42	Carson Hocevar	Niece Motorsports	Chevrolet	250	187.50 (301.752)	1:59:32	94.116	Report	
2024	August 10	98	Ty Majeski	ThorSport Racing	Ford	250	187.50 (301.752)	2:25:18	77.426	Report	
2025	August 15	11	Corey Heim	Tricon Garage	Toyota	250	187.50 (301.752)	2:13:12	84.459	Report	
2026	August 15*	11	Kaden Honeycutt	Tricon Garage	Toyota	250	187.50 (301.752)	2:00:46	93.155	Report	

- 1999: Race shortened due to rain.
- 2004 & 2005: Race extended due to NASCAR overtime.
- 2020: Race postponed from April 18 to September 10 due to the COVID-19 pandemic.
- 2026: Race postponed from August 14 to August 15 due to inclement weather.

=== Multiple winners (drivers) ===
# Wins	Driver	Years won
2	Mike Skinner	1996, 2005
2	Jack Sprague	1998, 2001
2	Tony Stewart	2002, 2003

=== Multiple winners (teams) ===
# Wins	Team	Years won
3	Hendrick Motorsports	1995, 1998, 2001
2	Andy Petree Racing	2002, 2003
2	Kyle Busch Motorsports	2021, 2022
2	ThorSport Racing	2020, 2024
2	Tricon Garage	2025, 2026

=== Manufacturer wins ===
# Wins	Make	Years won
7	(United States) Chevrolet	1995, 1996, 1998, 2001-2003, 2023
5	(Japan) Toyota	2005, 2021, 2022, 2025, 2026
4	(United States) Ford	1999, 2000, 2020, 2024
2	(United States) Dodge	1997, 2004
