= Sears Craftsman 175 =

NASCAR Craftsman Truck Series
- Venue: Chicago Motor Speedway
- Location: Cicero, Illinois, United States
- Corporate sponsor: Sears; Craftsman
- First race: 2000
- Last race: 2001
- Distance: 180.075 miles (289.803 km)
- Laps: 175

Circuit information
- Surface: Asphalt
- Length: 1.029 mi (1.656 km)
- Turns: 4

The Sears Craftsman 175 was a NASCAR Craftsman Truck Series race that took place at Chicago Motor Speedway. The race was only held during the 2000 and 2001 seasons.

In 2001, 16-year-old Kyle Busch dominated the race but ran out of fuel with 20 laps to go.

== Past winners ==
Year	Date	No.	Driver	Team	Manufacturer	Race Distance		Race Time	Average Speed (mph)	Report	Ref
Year	Date	No.	Driver	Team	Manufacturer	Laps	Miles (km)	Race Time	Average Speed (mph)	Report	Ref
2000	August 27	18	Joe Ruttman	Bobby Hamilton Racing	Dodge	177*	182.133 (293.114)	2:04:31	85.29	Report	
2001	August 18	2	Scott Riggs	Ultra Motorsports	Dodge	175	180.075 (289.803)	1:53:30	92.511	Report	

- 2000: Race extended due to a green–white–checker finish.

=== Manufacturer wins ===
# Wins	Make	Years won	Ref
2	(United States) Dodge	2000, 2001	
