= NASCAR Craftsman Truck Series at Portland International Raceway =

1999 Motor race held in Portland

Grainger Industrial Supply 225K

NASCAR Craftsman Truck Series
- Venue: Portland International Raceway
- Location: Portland, Oregon; 45°35′49″N 122°41′45″W
- Corporate sponsor: Grainger Industrial Supply
- First race: 1999
- Last race: 2000
- Distance: 143.591 miles (231 km) (1999); 142.35 miles (229 km) (2000)
- Laps: 73

The Grainger Industrial Supply 225K was an annual NASCAR Craftsman Truck Series race held at Portland International Raceway in 1999 and 2000. And it was the first time a top three NASCAR national series visited the track.

== Past winners ==
Year	Date	No.	Driver	Team	Manufacturer	Race distance		Race time	Average speed (mph)	Report	Ref
Year	Date	No.	Driver	Team	Manufacturer	Laps	Miles (km)	Race time	Average speed (mph)	Report	Ref
1.967 miles (3.166 km) Layout
1999	June 18	50	Greg Biffle	Roush Racing	Ford	73	143.591 (231.087)	1:59:43	71.343	Report	
1.950 miles (3.138 km) Layout
2000	April 22	60	Andy Houston	Addington Racing	Chevrolet	73	142.350 (229.090)	1:54:57	74.301	Report	
