= Wayne Edwards (racing driver) =

American racing driver (born 1967)

- Born: June 23, 1967 (age 59); Shepherdsville, Kentucky, U.S.

NASCAR O'Reilly Auto Parts Series career
- 2 races run over 2 years
- Best finish: 149th (2005)
- First race: 2003 Trim Spa Dream Body 250 (Pikes Peak)
- Last race: 2005 Meijer 300 (Kentucky)
Wins	Top tens	Poles
0	0	0

NASCAR FedEx Freight Truck Series career
- 78 races run over 16 years
- 2016 position: 43rd
- Best finish: 26th (2000)
- First race: 2000 Florida Dodge Dealers 400K (Homestead)
- Last race: 2016 DC Solar 350 (Las Vegas)
Wins	Top tens	Poles
0	1	0
- Statistics up to date as of April 18, 2020.

Wayne Edwards (born June 23, 1967) is an American professional stock car racing driver. He has driven for numerous teams over the past eight years. He is not related to fellow stock car driver Carl Edwards despite having the same last name.

== Racing career ==
Edwards made his Truck Series debut in 2000, driving the No. 93 WorldBestBuy.com Chevy for Troxell Racing. His debut came at Homestead-Miami, where he started 30th and finished 27th, fifteen laps down. In twelve other races, his best finish was a 19th at NHIS, and posting a best qualifying effort of 27th twice. He made another pair of starts in 2001, both coming again with Troxell Racing. He was 34th at Gateway and 35th at California, failing to finish both races. However, he did set his best career start of 21st at California.

In 2002, Edwards made three starts for Team Racing. His best finish came at Darlington Raceway, where he finished 25th. He also drove at Texas Motor Speedway for Steve Portenga, finishing 33rd after an early vibration. He followed that up with eight starts in 2003, his best finish a 22nd at Texas driving the No. 95 for Scott Upshaw. He also made his Busch Series debut at Pikes Peak International Raceway driving the No. 22 for Bost Motorsports. He started 38th but finished 43rd due to a transmission failure on the first lap. Edwards ran four more races in 2004. He set his best career finish to that point with a fifteenth at Daytona International Speedway, and then had a 28th finish in the inaugural race at Atlanta driving for Troxell, but did not finish either of his next two starts in the No. 0 Loni Richardson-owned Chevy. He attempted the Emerson Radio 250 in the No. 70 Davis Motorsports Chevy, but failed to qualify.

Edwards returned to Troxell full-time in 2005, which had been newly renamed Mighty Motorsports. He started the season by dodging a last lap wreck, and driving the No. 24 truck to a ninth place at Daytona, his best career finish. Also, Edwards was able to finish four of his other nine starts, the best of those being a 23rd at Loudon. He finished 33rd in points. He also made his second career Busch start at Kentucky Speedway driving the No. 91 Speed Zone Energy Drink Dodge, finishing 36th after suffering transmission failure. Edwards attempted to make the first handful of races in 2006 in Mighty's No. 24 Liquid Nitro Energy Drink truck, but failed. He made his first start of the season at Kentucky for Green Light finishing 33rd after suffering vibration problems in his No. 07 U.S. Restoration Chevy. He drove two more races for Green Light in the No. 03 Chevy, but did not finish higher than 35th. In 2007, Edwards started two races for Upshaw Racing, but left after the stopped running. He made three appearances for Green Light's No. 06 Chevy, and drove two races for Andy Hillenburg, with a best finish of 28th. He also attempted a race in Andy Belmont's truck, but failed to qualify.

In 2008, Edwards raced for FDNY Racing, and SS-Green Light Racing, making five starts altogether. Edwards raced the first two races of 2009 for GunBroker Racing finishing 36th at Daytona and 34th at Auto Club Speedway. For the rest of the 2009 season, Edwards start and parked in the No. 47 and No. 48 trucks owned by Andy Hillenburg.

== Motorsports career results ==
=== NASCAR ===
(key) (Bold – Pole position awarded by qualifying time. Italics – Pole position earned by points standings or practice time. * – Most laps led.)

==== Busch Series ====
NASCAR Busch Series results
Year	Team	No.	Make	1	2	3	4	5	6	7	8	9	10	11	12	13	14	15	16	17	18	19	20	21	22	23	24	25	26	27	28	29	30	31	32	33	34	35	NBSC	Pts	Ref
2003	Bost Motorsports	22	Chevy	DAY	CAR	LVS	DAR	BRI	TEX	TAL	NSH	CAL	RCH	GTY	NZH	CLT	DOV	NSH	KEN	MLW	DAY	CHI	NHA	PPR; 43	IRP	MCH	BRI	DAR	RCH	DOV	KAN	CLT	MEM	ATL	PHO	CAR	HOM		154th	34	
2004	JD Motorsports	70	Chevy	DAY	CAR	LVS	DAR	BRI	TEX	NSH	TAL	CAL	GTY	RCH	NZH	CLT	DOV	NSH	KEN	MLW; DNQ	DAY	CHI	NHA	PPR	IRP	MCH	BRI	CAL											NA	-	
2004	Ware Racing Enterprises	51	Dodge																										RCH; DNQ	DOV	KAN	CLT	MEM	ATL	PHO	DAR	HOM		NA	-	
2005	TommyRaz Motorsports	91	Dodge	DAY	CAL	MXC	LVS	ATL	NSH	BRI	TEX	PHO	TAL	DAR	RCH	CLT	DOV	NSH	KEN; 36	MLW	DAY	CHI	NHA	PPR	GTY														149th	-	
2005	TommyRaz Motorsports	9	Chevy																							IRP; DNQ	GLN	MCH	BRI	CAL	RCH	DOV	KAN	CLT	MEM	TEX	PHO	HOM	149th	-	

==== Camping World Truck Series ====
NASCAR Camping World Truck Series results
Year	Team	No.	Make	1	2	3	4	5	6	7	8	9	10	11	12	13	14	15	16	17	18	19	20	21	22	23	24	25	NCWTC	Pts	Ref
1999	Doran Racing	77	Chevy	HOM	PHO	EVG	MMR	MAR	MEM	PPR	I70	BRI	TEX	PIR	GLN	MLW	NSV	NZH	MCH	NHA	IRP	GTY	HPT	RCH	LVS	LVL; DNQ	TEX	CAL	114th	0	
2000	Troxell Racing	93	Chevy	DAY; DNQ	HOM; 27	PHO; 25	MMR; 34	MAR; DNQ	PIR	GTY; DNQ	MEM; 23	PPR; 25	EVG	TEX; 23	KEN; 32	GLN; 27	MLW; 29	NHA; 19	NZH; 20	MCH; 33	IRP; DNQ	NSV; DNQ	CIC; DNQ	RCH; DNQ	DOV; 23	TEX; DNQ	CAL		26th	1391	
2001	Troxell Racing	93	Chevy	DAY	HOM	MMR	MAR	GTY; 34	DAR	PPR	DOV	TEX	MEM	MLW	KAN	KEN	NHA	IRP	NSH	CIC	NZH	RCH	SBO	TEX	LVS	PHO	CAL; 35		91st	119	
2002	Team Racing	86	Chevy	DAY	DAR; 25	MAR	GTY	PPR	DOV				KAN; 36	KEN	NHA	MCH	IRP	NSH	RCH	TEX	SBO	LVS							57th	274	
2002	Portenga Motorsports	38	Chevy							TEX; 33	MEM	MLW																	57th	274	
2002	Team 23 Racing	23	Chevy																				CAL; 32	PHO	HOM				57th	274	
2003	Team Racing	25	Chevy	DAY	DAR	MMR	MAR	CLT	DOV	TEX; 36	MEM	MLW	KAN; DNQ	KEN	GTW	MCH	IRP	NSH											39th	595	
2003	Upshaw Racing	19	Ford																BRI; 23										39th	595	
2003	Upshaw Racing	95	Ford																	RCH; 24	NHA	CAL; 24	LVS; 28	SBO	TEX; 22	MAR; DNQ	PHO; 28	HOM; DNQ	39th	595	
2003	Brevak Racing	31	Ford																							MAR; 33			39th	595	
2004	Troxell Racing	93	Ford	DAY; 15	ATL; 28																								64th	198	
2004	Ron Rhodes Racing	48	Dodge			MAR; DNQ	MFD	CLT	DOV	TEX	MEM	MLW	KAN																64th	198	
2004	Richardson Motorsports	0	Dodge											KEN; 36															64th	198	
2004	Richardson Motorsports	0	Chevy												GTW; 33	MCH	IRP	NSH	BRI										64th	198	
2004	Troxell Racing	93	Chevy																	RCH; DNQ	NHA	LVS	CAL						64th	198	
2004	Welz Racing	77	Dodge																					TEX; DNQ	MAR	PHO	DAR	HOM	64th	198	
2005	Mighty Motorsports	24	Chevy	DAY; 9	CAL; 34	ATL; 33	MAR	GTY	MFD; 35	CLT; DNQ	DOV; 33	TEX	MCH	MLW	KAN; 34	KEN; 27	MEM	IRP				NHA; 23	LVS	MAR; 25	ATL; DNQ	TEX; DNQ	PHO; 28	HOM; DNQ	33rd	789	
2005	Welz Racing	68	Dodge																NSH; DNQ										33rd	789	
2005	Mighty Motorsports	24	Dodge																	BRI; DNQ	RCH								33rd	789	
2006	Mighty Motorsports	24	Chevy	DAY; DNQ	CAL; DNQ	ATL	MAR	GTY	CLT	MFD	DOV	TEX	MCH	MLW	KAN														84th	64	
2006	Green Light Racing	07	Chevy													KEN; 33	MEM	IRP	NSH	BRI	NHA								84th	64	
2006	Green Light Racing	03	Chevy																			LVS; 36	TAL; 35	MAR	ATL	TEX	PHO	HOM	84th	64	
2007	Upshaw Racing	95	Ford	DAY; DNQ	CAL; 33	ATL; 32	MAR	KAN	CLT	MFD	DOV	TEX	MCH	MLW															68th	222	
2007	Green Light Racing	0	Chevy												MEM; 36														68th	222	
2007	Green Light Racing	06	Chevy													KEN; 35	IRP						TAL; 36	MAR					68th	222	
2007	Fast Track Racing Enterprises	71	Chevy															NSH; 28	BRI	GTW	NHA	LVS							68th	222	
2007	Fast Track Racing Enterprises	71	Ford																						ATL; 29				68th	222	
2007	Andy Belmont Motorsports	12	Chevy																							TEX; DNQ	PHO	HOM	68th	222	
2008	FDNY Racing	28	Chevy	DAY; 17	CAL	ATL	MAR		CLT; DNQ	MFD	DOV	TEX	MCH	MLW		KEN; DNQ	IRP	NSH	BRI	GTW	NHA	LVS	TAL; 24	MAR					55th	267	
2008	SS-Green Light Racing	0	Chevy					KAN; 36							MEM; 35										ATL; 33	TEX	PHO	HOM	55th	267	
2009	GunBroker Racing	22	Dodge	DAY; 36	CAL; 34	ATL	MAR	KAN																					28th	1067	
2009	FDNY Racing	28	Chevy						CLT; DNQ																				28th	1067	
2009	Fast Track Racing Enterprises	48	Chevy							DOV; 32	TEX; 24	MCH; 23	MLW; 27	MEM	KEN; 24		NSH; 24		CHI; 26		GTW; 33	NHA	LVS; 27	MAR	TAL	TEX			28th	1067	
2009	Fast Track Racing Enterprises	47	Chevy													IRP; 29		BRI; 36		IOW; 30									28th	1067	
2009	Boys Will Be Boys Racing	05	Dodge																								PHO; 32	HOM	28th	1067	
2010	Lafferty Motorsports	89	Chevy	DAY; DNQ	ATL	MAR	NSH	KAN	DOV																				117th	61	
2010	FDNY Racing	28	Chevy							CLT; DNQ																			117th	61	
2010	Tagsby Racing	65	Chevy								TEX; 34	MCH	IOW	GTY	IRP	POC	NSH	DAR	BRI	CHI	KEN	NHA	LVS	MAR	TAL	TEX	PHO	HOM	117th	61	
2011	T3R Motorsports	99	Ford	DAY	PHO	DAR	MAR	NSH	DOV	CLT	KAN	TEX	KEN	IOW	NSH	IRP	POC	MCH	BRI	ATL; DNQ									103rd	0^{1}	
2011	Alger Motorsports	68	Dodge																		CHI; DNQ	NHA	KEN						103rd	0^{1}	
2011	JJC Racing	0	Ford																					LVS; 31	TAL	MAR	TEX	HOM	103rd	0^{1}	
2012	Glenden Enterprises	84	Chevy	DAY	MAR	CAR	KAN	CLT	DOV	TEX	KEN	IOW	CHI	POC	MCH	BRI	ATL	IOW; 24	KEN	LVS	TAL	MAR	TEX	PHO	HOM				67th	20	
2015	Premium Motorsports	94	Chevy	DAY	ATL	MAR	KAN	CLT	DOV	TEX	GTW	IOW	KEN	ELD	POC	MCH	BRI	MSP	CHI	NHA	LVS; 24	TAL	MAR	TEX	PHO	HOM			70th	20	
2016	Premium Motorsports	49	Chevy	DAY	ATL	MAR	KAN	DOV	CLT	TEX; 23	IOW	GTW	KEN	ELD; 18	POC	BRI	MCH	MSP	CHI	NHA	LVS; 28	TAL	MAR	TEX	PHO	HOM			43rd	30	

==== Goody's Dash Series ====
NASCAR Goody's Dash Series results
Year	Team	No.	Make	1	2	3	4	5	6	7	8	9	10	11	12	13	14	15	16	17	18	NGDS	Pts	Ref
2000	N/A	77	Toyota	DAY	MON	STA	JAC	CAR	CLT	SBO	ROU	LOU	SUM	GRE	SNM	MYB	BRI	HCY	JAC; 20	USA; 35	LAN	57th	161	
2001	N/A	21	Toyota	DAY; 19																		9th	2194	
2001	N/A	77	Toyota		ROU; 17	DAR; 14	CLT; 8	LOU; 11	JAC; 13	KEN; 10	SBO; 12	DAY; 13	GRE; 10	SNM; 14	NRV; 10	MYB; 15	BRI; 20					9th	2194	
2001	N/A	99	Pontiac															ACE; 22	JAC; 16	USA; 10	NSH; 15	9th	2194	
2002	N/A	7	Pontiac	DAY; 39	HAR	ROU	LON	CLT														26th	580	
2002	N/A	75	Toyota						KEN; 17	MEM	GRE; 22	SNM; 25	SBO	MYB; 26			ATL; DNQ					26th	580	
2002	N/A	22	Pontiac												BRI; DNQ	MOT						26th	580	

^{*} Season still in progress
^{1} Ineligible for series points

=== ARCA Racing Series ===
(key) (Bold – Pole position awarded by qualifying time. Italics – Pole position earned by points standings or practice time. * – Most laps led.)

ARCA Racing Series results
Year	Team	No.	Make	1	2	3	4	5	6	7	8	9	10	11	12	13	14	15	16	17	18	19	20	21	22	23	ARSC	Pts	Ref
2007	Drew White Motorsports	93	Chevy	DAY	USA	NSH	SLM; DNQ	KAN	WIN; 20	KEN; 29	TOL; DNQ	IOW	POC	MCH; 39	BLN	KEN	POC	NSH	ISF	MIL	GTW	DSF	CHI				70th	370	
2007	Lafferty Motorsports	0	Chevy																					SLM; 32	TAL	TOL	70th	370	
2014	Team BEAR	29	Dodge	DAY	MOB	SLM	TAL	TOL; 15	NJE	POC	MCH	ELK	WIN	CHI	IRP; 25	POC	BLN	ISF	MAD	DSF	SLM	KEN	KAN				62nd	260	
