= Conrad Burr =

American racing driver

- Nationality: (United States) American
- Born: November 23, 1968 (age 57) China Grove, North Carolina, U.S.

Previous series
- 1994–2001, 2003 1999: NASCAR Southeast Series NASCAR Southwest Series

NASCAR FedEx Freight Truck Series career
- 11 races run over 4 years
- Best finish: 46th (2002)
- First race: 2000 NAPA 250 (Martinsville)
- Last race: 2003 Virginia Is For Lovers 200 (Richmond)
Wins	Top tens	Poles
0	0	0
- Statistics up to date as of July 12, 2020.

Conrad Burr (born November 23, 1968) is an American former stock car racing driver. He competed part-time in the Craftsman Truck Series from 2000 to 2003. Burr also drove numerous races in the NASCAR Southeast Series, particularly in the mid and late 1990s, where he ran nearly full seasons and picked up one win in 1999.

== Racing career ==
Burr made his debut in 2000, when he drove the Jim Rosenblum Racing No. 28 Chevy into the field at Martinsville. He started the event in 31st, but only managed 25th. Yet, he did finish the event, a tall task at the short track.

Burr made another solo start in 2001, driving for his own team at Nashville. He started the event in last (36th) and only made it up to 34th before retiring early.

Burr returned to Rosenblum's team in 2002 for a five race schedule. He did well, finishing all but one race with the low-budget team. He had a good run at Las Vegas, earning his season best of 23rd, while at Texas Burr started 27th for his best start of the year. His 46th-place finish in points would prove to be his career high.

Burr made four starts as 2003 would prove to be his last year. Returning to a family-owned team, Burr earned two top-20 finishes in his starts. The better of those would prove to be a 15th at Dover, coupled with the 18th at Memphis. Also, at Charlotte, Burr earned his best career start of 25th.

Despite having his best year in 2003, Burr's team folded and he never made another NASCAR start after that.

== Motorsports career results ==
=== NASCAR ===
(key) (Bold – Pole position awarded by qualifying time. Italics – Pole position earned by points standings or practice time. * – Most laps led.)

==== Craftsman Truck Series ====
NASCAR Craftsman Truck Series results
Year	Team	No.	Make	1	2	3	4	5	6	7	8	9	10	11	12	13	14	15	16	17	18	19	20	21	22	23	24	25	NCTC	Pts	Ref
2000	Jim Rosenblum Racing	28	Chevy	DAY	HOM	PHO	MMR	MAR; 25	PIR	GTY	MEM	PPR	EVG	TEX	KEN	GLN	MLW	NHA	NZH	MCH	IRP	NSV; DNQ	CIC	RCH	DOV	TEX	CAL		84th	128	
2001	Burr Motorsports	87	Chevy	DAY	HOM	MMR	MAR	GTY	DAR	PPR	DOV	TEX	MEM	MLW	KAN	KEN; DNQ	NHA	IRP	NSH	CIC	NZH; 34	RCH	SBO	TEX	LVS	PHO	CAL; DNQ		101st	86	
2002	FDNY Racing	28	Chevy	DAY	DAR	MAR	GTY	PPR	DOV	TEX	MEM	MLW	KAN	KEN	NHA	MCH; 27	IRP	NSH; 26	RCH; DNQ	TEX; 26	SBO; 33	LVS; 23	CAL	PHO	HOM				46th	410	
2003	Burr Motorsports	87	Chevy	DAY	DAR	MMR	MAR; DNQ	CLT; 26	DOV; 15	TEX	MEM; 18	MLW; DNQ	KAN	KEN	GTW	MCH	IRP; DNQ	NSH	BRI	RCH; 28	NHA	CAL							58th	391	
2003	Upshaw Racing	94	Ford																				LVS; DNQ	SBO	TEX	MAR	PHO	HOM	58th	391	
