= Jason Hedlesky =

American racing driver (born 1974)

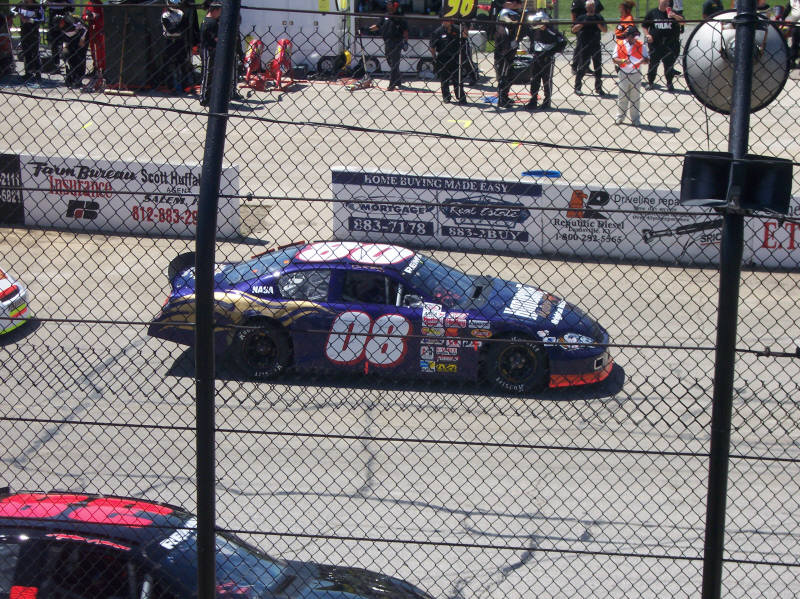
- Hedlesky's No. 08 ARCA car in 2006
- Born: February 20, 1974 (age 52); Clinton, Michigan, U.S.

NASCAR Cup Series career
- 1 race run over 1 year
- Best finish: 87th (2002)
- First race: 2002 UAW-GM Quality 500 (Lowe's)
Wins	Top tens	Poles
0	0	0

NASCAR FedEx Freight Truck Series career
- 1 race run over 1 year
- Best finish: 95th (2002)
- First race: 2002 Michigan 200 (Michigan)
Wins	Top tens	Poles
0	0	0

Jason Hedlesky (born February 20, 1974) is an American former professional stock car racing driver and spotter. He has previously competed in the NASCAR Winston Cup Series, the NASCAR Craftsman Truck Series, and the ARCA Re/Max Series.

== Career ==
Hedlesky has competed in select ARCA Re/Max races from 2000 to 2007, with the exception of 2004. Hedlesky's previous ARCA starts came behind the wheel of cars fielded by legendary team owner, Junie Donlavey.

Hedlesky was the general manager of Donlavey Racing in the Winston Cup Series from 1998 to 2004, the year Donlavey decided to retire from active competition. At the 2002 UAW-GM Quality 500 at Lowe's Motor Speedway, he was the last person to qualify Donlavey's legendary No. 90 Lucas Oil Ford, starting 41st and finishing 43rd after 31 laps for his only Cup start.

Hedlesky's last competitive race was in 2007 in the ARCA Series.

After his driving career, Hedlesky became a spotter in NASCAR, first working with Carl Edwards' No. 99 team for Roush Fenway Racing. He initially started spotting part time while continuing to race in ARCA, when the two series' schedules did not conflict with each other. Eventually, he also started spotting for Matt Crafton's No. 88 team for ThorSport Racing in the Truck Series. In 2015, when Edwards left Roush for the new fourth Joe Gibbs Racing car, the No. 19, Hedlesky moved over with him.

In 2017, Hedlesky became the spotter for Cup Series driver Matt Kenseth. He was swapped with Kenseth's previous spotter Chris Osborne after the surprise retirement of Edwards and the promotion of Daniel Suárez to the 19 car in the Monster Energy Cup Series. The duo of Osborne and Suarez had previously worked together in the Xfinity Series, winning the 2016 championship.

Hedlesky lost his job with JGR after Erik Jones and his spotter Rick Carelli moved over together from Furniture Row Racing to the No. 20 car for Gibbs, replacing Kenseth and Hedlesky. However, he continues to spot in the Truck Series for Crafton and ThorSport Racing. He also later started spotting for DGR-Crosley when the team was formed in 2018.

== Motorsports career results ==
=== NASCAR ===
(key) (Bold – Pole position awarded by qualifying time. Italics – Pole position earned by points standings or practice time. * – Most laps led.)

==== Winston Cup Series ====
NASCAR Winston Cup Series results
Year	Team	No.	Make	1	2	3	4	5	6	7	8	9	10	11	12	13	14	15	16	17	18	19	20	21	22	23	24	25	26	27	28	29	30	31	32	33	34	35	36	NWCC	Pts	Ref
2002	Donlavey Racing	90	Ford	DAY	CAR	LVS	ATL	DAR	BRI	TEX	MAR	TAL	CAL	RCH	CLT	DOV	POC	MCH	SON	DAY	CHI	NHA	POC	IND	GLN	MCH	BRI	DAR	RCH	NHA	DOV	KAN	TAL	CLT; 43	MAR	ATL	CAR	PHO	HOM	87th	34	

==== Busch Series ====
NASCAR Busch Series results
Year	Team	No.	Make	1	2	3	4	5	6	7	8	9	10	11	12	13	14	15	16	17	18	19	20	21	22	23	24	25	26	27	28	29	30	31	32	33	34	NBSC	Pts	Ref
2003	Stanton Barrett Motorsports	91	Pontiac	DAY	CAR	LVS	DAR	BRI	TEX	TAL	NSH	CAL; DNQ	RCH	GTY	NZH	CLT	DOV	NSH	KEN	MLW	DAY; DNQ	CHI	NHA	PPR	IRP	MCH	BRI	DAR	RCH	DOV	KAN	CLT						NA	-	
2003	MacDonald Motorsports	72	Chevy																														MEM; DNQ	ATL	PHO	CAR	HOM	NA	-	

==== Craftsman Truck Series ====
NASCAR Craftsman Truck Series results
Year	Team	No.	Make	1	2	3	4	5	6	7	8	9	10	11	12	13	14	15	16	17	18	19	20	21	22	23	24	25	NCTC	Pts	Ref
2002	Ware Racing Enterprises	5	Chevy	DAY	DAR	MAR	GTY	PPR	DOV	TEX	MEM	MLW	KAN	KEN	NHA	MCH; 31	IRP	NSH	RCH	TEX	SBO	LVS	CAL	PHO	HOM				95th	70	
2003	Ware Racing Enterprises	51	Chevy	DAY	DAR	MMR	MAR	CLT	DOV	TEX	MEM	MLW	KAN	KEN	GTW	MCH	IRP	NSH	BRI	RCH	NHA	CAL	LVS	SBO	TEX	MAR	PHO	HOM; DNQ	NA	-	

=== ARCA Re/Max Series ===
(key) (Bold – Pole position awarded by qualifying time. Italics – Pole position earned by points standings or practice time. * – Most laps led.)

ARCA Re/Max Series results
Year	Team	No.	Make	1	2	3	4	5	6	7	8	9	10	11	12	13	14	15	16	17	18	19	20	21	22	23	24	25	ARMC	Pts	Ref
2000	Donlavey Racing	90	Ford	DAY	SLM	AND	CLT; 38	KIL	FRS	MCH; 14	POC	TOL	KEN	BLN	POC; 25	WIN	ISF	KEN	DSF	SLM	CLT; 39	TAL	ATL; 15						54th	495	
2001	Donlavey Racing	90	Ford	DAY	NSH; DNQ	WIN	SLM	GTY	KEN	CLT; 29	KAN	MCH; 25	POC; Wth	MEM	GLN	KEN	MCH	POC; 33	NSH	ISF	CHI	DSF	SLM	TOL	BLN	CLT; 13	TAL	ATL; 31	67th	520	
2002	Donlavey Racing	90	Ford	DAY	ATL	NSH	SLM	KEN	CLT; 15	KAN	POC	MCH; 17	TOL	SBO	KEN	BLN	POC	NSH	ISF	WIN	DSF	CHI	SLM	TAL	CLT				92nd	300	
2003	Donlavey Racing	90	Ford	DAY	ATL	NSH	SLM	TOL	KEN	CLT; DNQ	BLN	KAN	MCH; 15	LER	POC	POC	NSH; 37	ISF	WIN; 24	DSF	CHI	SLM	TAL; 13	CLT	SBO				61st	505	
2005	Hardcore Motorsports	08	Chevy	DAY	NSH	SLM	KEN	TOL	LAN	MIL	POC	MCH	KAN	KEN	BLN	POC	GTW	LER	NSH	MCH	ISF	TOL	DSF	CHI	SLM; QL^{†}				150th	100	
2005	Hardcore Motorsports	08	Dodge																							TAL; 26			150th	100	
2006	Hardcore Motorsports	08	Dodge	DAY; 11	NSH; 33						MCH; 28	KAN; 14													TAL; 12				8th	4290	
2006	Hardcore Motorsports	08	Chevy			SLM; 22	WIN; 17	KEN; 24	TOL; 31	POC; 19				BLN; 22					ISF; 20		TOL; 15	DSF; 15		SLM; 13					8th	4290	
2006	Hardcore Motorsports	08	Ford										KEN; 28		POC; 13	GTW; 16	NSH; 8	MCH; 21		MIL; 25			CHI; 20			IOW; 23			8th	4290	
2007	Hardcore Motorsports	08	Dodge	DAY; 27																									18th	3010	
2007	Hardcore Motorsports	08	Ford		USA; 29	NSH; 15	SLM; 35	KAN; 20	WIN; 9	KEN; 19	TOL; 25	IOW; 10	POC; 11	MCH; 18	BLN; 21	KEN; 11													18th	3010	
2007	Frank Kimmel Racing	44	Ford														POC; DNQ												18th	3010	
2007	Carter 2 Motorsports	48	Dodge															NSH; 29	ISF	MIL									18th	3010	
2007	Bob Schacht Motorsports	75	Ford																		GTW; 28	DSF	CHI; 14	SLM					18th	3010	
2007	Yates Racing	7	Ford																						TAL; 14	TOL			18th	3010	
^{†} - Qualified but replaced by Stan Boyd
