= Jay Godley =

American racing driver

- Born: 1981 or 1982 (age 44–45); Charlotte, North Carolina, U.S.

NASCAR FedEx Freight Truck Series career
- 2 races run over 1 year
- Best finish: 80th (2003)
- First race: 2003 John Boy & Billy 250 (South Boston)
- Last race: 2003 Advance Auto Parts 200 (Martinsvilee)
Wins	Top tens	Poles
0	0	0
- Statistics up to date as of December 19, 2024.

Jay Godley (born 1981 or 1982) is an American former professional stock car racing driver who has competed in the NASCAR Craftsman Truck Series and the NASCAR Goody's Dash Series.

Godley has also previously competed in the IPOWER Dash Series, the ARA Late Model Stock All-Star Tour, the Allison Legacy Series, and the UARA STARS Late Model Series.

== Motorsports results ==
=== NASCAR ===
(key) (Bold - Pole position awarded by qualifying time. Italics - Pole position earned by points standings or practice time. * – Most laps led.)

==== Craftsman Truck Series ====
NASCAR Craftsman Truck Series results
Year	Team	No.	Make	1	2	3	4	5	6	7	8	9	10	11	12	13	14	15	16	17	18	19	20	21	22	23	24	25	NCTC	Pts	Ref
2003	MRD Motorsports	68	Chevy	DAY	DAR	MMR	MAR	CLT	DOV	TEX	MEM	MLW	KAN	KEN	GTW	MCH	IRP	NSH	BRI	RCH	NHA	CAL	LVS	SBO; 22	TEX	MAR; 20	PHO	HOM	80th	200	

==== Goody's Dash Series ====
NASCAR Goody's Dash Series results
Year	Team	No.	Make	1	2	3	4	5	6	7	8	9	10	11	12	13	14	NGDS	Pts	Ref
2002	MRD Motorsports	18	Pontiac	DAY	HAR; 15	ROU; 19	LON; 4	CLT	KEN	MEM	GRE; 12	SNM; 23	SBO; 21	MYB	BRI; 21	MOT	ATL	20th	805	
2003	MRD Motorsports	18	Pontiac	DAY; 37	OGL; 3	CLT; 12	SBO; 19	GRE; 7	KEN; 22	BRI; 25	ATL; 18							13th	890	
