= Ronnie Hornaday =

American racing driver (born 1979)

- Born: Ronald Lee Hornaday III; August 1, 1979 (age 47); Palmdale, California, U.S.

NASCAR O'Reilly Auto Parts Series career
- 1 race run over 1 year
- Best finish: 130th (2001)
- First race: 2001 Outback Steakhouse 300 (Kentucky)
Wins	Top tens	Poles
0	0	0

NASCAR FedEx Freight Truck Series career
- 14 races run over 6 years
- Best finish: 37th (1999)
- First race: 1999 Memphis 200 (Memphis)
- Last race: 2005 Hardee's 200 (Charlotte)
Wins	Top tens	Poles
0	0	0

Ronald Lee Hornaday III (born August 1, 1979) is an American NASCAR driver and the son of NASCAR Camping World Truck Series champion Ron Hornaday Jr. On May 12, 2001, he earned a career best finish of eleventh at Darlington Raceway, his best out of twelve starts.

== Motorsports career results ==
=== NASCAR ===
(key) (Bold – Pole position awarded by qualifying time. Italics – Pole position earned by points standings or practice time. * – Most laps led.)

==== Busch Series ====
NASCAR Busch Series results
Year	Team	No.	Make	1	2	3	4	5	6	7	8	9	10	11	12	13	14	15	16	17	18	19	20	21	22	23	24	25	26	27	28	29	30	31	32	33	NBSC	Pts	Ref
2001	Wyler Racing	41	Chevy	DAY	CAR	LVS	ATL	DAR	BRI	TEX	NSH	TAL	CAL	RCH	NHA	NZH	CLT	DOV	KEN; 37	MLW	GLN	CHI	GTY	PPR	IRP	MCH	BRI	DAR	RCH	DOV	KAN	CLT	MEM	PHO	CAR	HOM	130th	52	

==== Craftsman Truck Series ====
NASCAR Craftsman Truck Series results
Year	Team	No.	Make	1	2	3	4	5	6	7	8	9	10	11	12	13	14	15	16	17	18	19	20	21	22	23	24	25	NCTC	Pts	Ref
1999	Ron Hornaday Jr.	97	Chevy	HOM	PHO	EVG	MMR	MAR; DNQ	MEM; 24	PPR	I70	BRI	TEX	PIR	GLN	MLW													37th	534	
1999	Ron Hornaday Jr.	6	Chevy														NSV; 17	NZH; 16	MCH	NHA	IRP; 23	GTY	HPT	RCH	LVS	LVL; 28	TEX	CAL	37th	534	
2000	Cunningham Motorsports	92	Chevy	DAY	HOM	PHO	MMR	MAR	PIR	GTY	MEM	PPR	EVG	TEX	KEN	GLN	MLW	NHA	NZH	MCH	IRP; DNQ	NSV	CIC	RCH	DOV	TEX			93rd	94	
2000	Ron Hornaday Jr.	94	Chevy																								CAL; 23		93rd	94	
2001	Ron Hornaday Jr.	94	Chevy	DAY; 21	HOM; 18	MMR	MAR; 14	GTY	DAR; 11	PPR	DOV	TEX	MEM	MLW	KAN	KEN	NHA	IRP; 30	NSH	CIC	NZH	RCH	SBO	TEX	LVS	PHO			45th	585	
2001	Green Light Racing	07	Chevy																								CAL; DNQ		45th	585	
2002	Team Racing	25	Chevy	DAY	DAR	MAR	GTY	PPR	DOV; 28	TEX	MEM	MLW	KAN	KEN	NHA	MCH	IRP	NSH	RCH	TEX	SBO	LVS	CAL	PHO	HOM				89th	79	
2003	MB Motorsports	63	Ford	DAY; 27	DAR	MMR	MAR	CLT; 32	DOV	TEX	MEM	MLW	KAN	KEN	GTW	MCH	IRP	NSH	BRI	RCH	NHA	CAL	LVS	SBO	TEX	MAR	PHO	HOM	91st	149	
2005	Ultra Motorsports	7	Dodge	DAY	CAL	ATL	MAR	GTY	MFD	CLT	DOV	TEX	MCH	MLW	KAN	KEN	MEM	IRP	NSH	BRI	RCH; DNQ	NHA	LVS	MAR	ATL	TEX	PHO	HOM	NA	-	

=== ARCA Re/Max Series ===
(key) (Bold – Pole position awarded by qualifying time. Italics – Pole position earned by points standings or practice time. * – Most laps led.)

ARCA Re/Max Series results
Year	Team	No.	Make	1	2	3	4	5	6	7	8	9	10	11	12	13	14	15	16	17	18	19	20	21	22	23	24	25	ARSC	Pts	Ref
2000		97	Chevy	DAY; 14	SLM	AND	CLT	KIL	FRS	MCH	POC	TOL	KEN	BLN	POC	WIN	ISF	KEN	DSF	SLM	CLT	TAL	ATL						101st	160	
2001	Cunningham Motorsports	4	Chevy	DAY; 11	NSH	WIN	SLM	GTY	KEN	CLT	KAN	MCH	POC	MEM	GLN	KEN	MCH	POC	NSH	ISF	CHI	DSF	SLM	TOL	BLN	CLT	TAL	ATL	128th	175	
2005	Cunningham Motorsports	4	Dodge	DAY	NSH	SLM; 11	KEN	TOL	LAN; 8	MIL	POC	MCH	KAN	KEN	BLN	POC	GTW	LER	NSH	MCH	ISF	TOL	DSF	CHI	SLM	TAL			79th	380	
