= Randy Briggs =

American racing driver (born 1965)

- Born: Randall Briggs; March 10, 1965 (age 61); Kansas City, Kansas, U.S.

NASCAR O'Reilly Auto Parts Series career
- 1 race run over 1 year
- Best finish: 152nd (2004)
- First race: 2004 Sharpie Professional 250 (Bristol)
Wins	Top tens	Poles
0	0	0

NASCAR FedEx Freight Truck Series career
- 25 races run over 4 years
- Best finish: 19th (2003)
- First race: 1999 O'Reilly Auto Parts 200 (I-70)
- Last race: 2003 Silverado 350 (Texas)
Wins	Top tens	Poles
0	0	0

Randall Briggs (born March 10, 1965) is an American professional stock car racing driver. He most notably ran full-time in the NASCAR Craftsman Truck Series in 2003. He also competed part-time for one year in both the NASCAR Busch Series (in 2004) and the ARCA Re/Max Series (in 2001).

== Motorsports career results ==
=== NASCAR ===
(key) (Bold – Pole position awarded by qualifying time. Italics – Pole position earned by points standings or practice time. * – Most laps led.)

==== Busch Series ====
NASCAR Busch Series results
Year	Team	No.	Make	1	2	3	4	5	6	7	8	9	10	11	12	13	14	15	16	17	18	19	20	21	22	23	24	25	26	27	28	29	30	31	32	33	34	NBSC	Pts	Ref
2004	Premier Motorsports	85	Chevy	DAY	CAR	LVS; DNQ	DAR	BRI; 36	TEX	NSH	TAL	CAL	GTY; DNQ	RCH	NZH	CLT	DOV	NSH	KEN	MLW	DAY	CHI	NHA	PPR	IRP	MCH	BRI	CAL	RCH	DOV	KAN; DNQ	CLT	MEM	ATL	PHO	DAR; DNQ	HOM	152nd	-	

==== Craftsman Truck Series ====
NASCAR Craftsman Truck Series results
Year	Team	No.	Make	1	2	3	4	5	6	7	8	9	10	11	12	13	14	15	16	17	18	19	20	21	22	23	24	25	NCTC	Pts	Ref
1999	Joe Jenkins III	53	Chevy	HOM	PHO	EVG	MMR	MAR	MEM	PPR	I70; 29	BRI	TEX	PIR	GLN	MLW	NSV	NZH	MCH	NHA	IRP	GTY	HPT; DNQ	RCH	LVS	LVL; DNQ	TEX	CAL	69th	76	
2001	Impact Motorsports	86	Ford	DAY	HOM	MMR	MAR	GTY	DAR	PPR	DOV	TEX	MEM	MLW	KAN; 18	KEN	NHA	IRP	NSH	CIC	NZH	RCH	SBO						73rd	182	
2001	Pro Motion Motorsports	53	Ford																					TEX; 30	LVS	PHO	CAL		73rd	182	
2002	Troxell Racing	93	Dodge	DAY; 26	DAR	MAR	GTY	PPR	DOV	TEX; 32	MEM	MLW																	45th	416	
2002	Troxell Racing	93	Ford										KAN; 23	KEN; 26	NHA														45th	416	
2002	Rick Ware Racing	51	Dodge													MCH; 26	IRP	NSH	RCH	TEX	SBO	LVS	CAL	PHO	HOM				45th	416	
2003	Pro Motion Motorsports	53	Ford	DAY; 14	DAR; 13			CLT; 34	DOV; 16	TEX; 20	MEM; 17	MLW; 20	KAN; 21	KEN; 17	GTW; 25	MCH; 16	IRP; 17	NSH; 19	BRI; 24	RCH	NHA								19th	1618	
2003	Pro Motion Motorsports	53	Dodge			MMR; 34	MAR; DNQ																						19th	1618	
2003	Rick Ware Racing	51	Dodge																			CAL; 23	LVS	SBO; DNQ					19th	1618	
2003	Pro Motion Motorsports	35	Ford																						TEX; 17	MAR	PHO	HOM	19th	1618	

=== ARCA Re/Max Series ===
(key) (Bold – Pole position awarded by qualifying time. Italics – Pole position earned by points standings or practice time. * – Most laps led.)

ARCA Re/Max Series results
Year	Team	No.	Make	1	2	3	4	5	6	7	8	9	10	11	12	13	14	15	16	17	18	19	20	21	22	23	24	25	ARMC	Pts	Ref
2001	Pro Motion Motorsports	42	Ford	DAY	NSH; 15	WIN	SLM	GTY	KEN	CLT	KAN; 22	MCH	POC	MEM	GLN	KEN	MCH	POC	NSH	ISF	CHI	DSF	SLM	TOL	BLN	CLT	TAL	ATL	100th	275	
