= Jamie Aube =

American racing driver (born 1953)

- Born: August 4, 1953 (age 73); Charlotte, Vermont, U.S.
- Achievements: 1988, 1989, 1990 Busch North Series Champion
- Awards: 1989 Busch North Series Most Popular Driver

NASCAR O'Reilly Auto Parts Series career
- 46 races run over 14 years
- Best finish: 32nd (1990)
- First race: 1986 Oxford 250 (Oxford)
- Last race: 2003 Kroger 200 (IRP)
- First win: 1987 Oxford 250 (Oxford)
Wins	Top tens	Poles
1	4	0

NASCAR FedEx Freight Truck Series career
- 11 races run over 1 year
- Best finish: 39th (2003)
- First race: 2003 Hardee's 200 (Charlotte)
- Last race: 2003 Chevy Silverado 150 (Phoenix)
Wins	Top tens	Poles
0	0	0
- Statistics up to date as of November 24, 2012.

Jamie Aube (born August 4, 1953) is an American stock car racing driver. He raced in what is now the ARCA Menards Series East, where he has won three consecutive championships. He also has one career win in the NASCAR Busch Series, at Oxford Plains Speedway in 1987.

In 2003, Aube ran in the Craftsman Truck Series in a limited schedule, driving trucks fielded by Team Racing. In eleven starts, his best finish was seventeenth at New Hampshire International Speedway. He also served as crew chief of the team.

In 2006, Aube returned to the NASCAR Busch East Series driving the No. 67 Chevrolet, garnering one top-ten in seven starts.

Following his retirement from NASCAR competition, Aube worked as a crew chief in the K&N Pro Series East, as well as competing in selected American Canadian Tour races.

== Motorsports career results ==
=== NASCAR ===
(key) (Bold – Pole position awarded by qualifying time. Italics – Pole position earned by points standings or practice time. * – Most laps led.)

==== Winston Cup Series ====
NASCAR Winston Cup Series results
Year	Team	No.	Make	1	2	3	4	5	6	7	8	9	10	11	12	13	14	15	16	17	18	19	20	21	22	23	24	25	26	27	28	29	30	31	NWCC	Pts	Ref
1994	Doug Innis Racing	38	Ford	DAY	CAR	RCH	ATL	DAR	BRI	NWS	MAR	TAL	SON	CLT	DOV	POC	MCH	DAY	NHA; DNQ	POC	TAL	IND	GLN	MCH	BRI	DAR	RCH	DOV	MAR	NWS	CLT	CAR	PHO	ATL	NA	-	

==== Busch Series ====
NASCAR Busch Series results
Year	Team	No.	Make	1	2	3	4	5	6	7	8	9	10	11	12	13	14	15	16	17	18	19	20	21	22	23	24	25	26	27	28	29	30	31	32	33	34	NBSC	Pts	Ref
1986	Mountain Racing	41	Olds	DAY	CAR	HCY	MAR	BRI	DAR	SBO	LGY	JFC	DOV	CLT	SBO	HCY	ROU	IRP	SBO	RAL	OXF; 6	SBO	HCY	LGY	ROU	BRI	DAR	RCH	DOV	MAR	ROU	CLT	CAR	MAR				130th	0	
1987	Mountain Racing	41	Olds	DAY	HCY	MAR	DAR	BRI	LGY	SBO	CLT	DOV	IRP	ROU	JFC	OXF; 1	SBO	HCY	RAL	LGY	ROU	BRI	JFC	DAR	RCH	DOV	MAR	CLT	CAR	MAR								104th	0	
1988	Mountain Racing	41	Buick	DAY	HCY	CAR	MAR	DAR	BRI	LNG	NZH; 11	SBO	NSV	CLT	DOV; 16	ROU	LAN	LVL	MYB	OXF; 14	SBO	HCY	LNG	IRP; 20	ROU	BRI	DAR		DOV; 18	MAR	CLT	CAR	MAR					39th	587	
1988	Mountain Racing	1	Buick																									RCH; 11										39th	587	
1989	Mountain Racing	41	Buick	DAY	CAR; 37	MAR; 15	HCY	DAR	BRI	NZH; 28	SBO	LAN	NSV	CLT	DOV; 24	ROU	LVL	VOL	MYB	SBO	HCY	DUB	IRP; 24	ROU	BRI	DAR	RCH; 20	DOV; 17	MAR	CLT	CAR	MAR						43rd	646	
1990	Mountain Racing	41	Buick	DAY	RCH; 14	CAR; 30	MAR; 13	HCY; 14	DAR; 26	BRI	LAN	SBO; 29	NZH; 17	HCY	CLT	DOV; 19	ROU	VOL	MYB	OXF; 6	NHA; 17	SBO	DUB	IRP; 15	ROU	BRI	DAR	RCH	DOV	MAR	CLT	NHA; 29	CAR	MAR				32nd	1274	
1991	Mountain Racing	41	Buick	DAY	RCH; 20	CAR	MAR	VOL	HCY	DAR	BRI	LAN	SBO	NZH; 36	CLT	DOV	ROU	HCY	MYB	GLN	OXF; 26	NHA; 28	SBO	DUB	IRP	ROU	BRI	DAR	RCH	DOV; 18	CLT	NHA; 8	CAR	MAR				47th	573	
1992	Mountain Racing	41	Buick	DAY	CAR	RCH; 33	ATL	MAR	DAR	BRI	HCY	LAN	DUB	NZH; 23	CLT	DOV	ROU	MYB	GLN	VOL	NHA; 18	TAL	IRP	ROU	MCH	NHA; 23	BRI	DAR	RCH	DOV	CLT	MAR	CAR	HCY				57th	382	
1993	Mountain Racing	41	Chevy	DAY	CAR	RCH	DAR	BRI	HCY	ROU	MAR	NZH	CLT	DOV	MYB	GLN	MLW	TAL	IRP	MCH	NHA; 17	BRI	DAR	RCH	DOV	ROU	CLT	MAR	CAR	HCY	ATL							NC^{2}	112	
1994	Mountain Racing	4	Chevy	DAY	CAR	RCH	ATL	MAR	DAR	HCY	BRI	ROU	NHA; 23	NZH	CLT	DOV	MYB	GLN	MLW	SBO	TAL	HCY	IRP	MCH	BRI	DAR	RCH	DOV	CLT	MAR	CAR							NC^{2}	0	
1995	Ingram Racing	11	Chevy	DAY; 34	CAR	RCH	ATL	NSV	DAR	BRI	HCY																											NC^{2}	0	
1995	Mountain Racing	41	Chevy									NHA; 30	NZH	CLT	DOV	MYB	GLN	MLW	TAL	SBO	IRP	MCH	BRI	DAR	RCH	DOV	CLT	CAR	HOM									NC^{2}	0	
1996	Mountain Racing	41	Chevy	DAY; 20	CAR	RCH	ATL	NSV	DAR	BRI	HCY	NZH; 39	CLT	DOV	SBO	MYB	GLN	MLW	NHA	TAL	IRP	MCH	BRI	DAR	RCH	DOV	CLT	CAR	HOM									NC^{2}	0	
1997	Wegner Motorsports	68	Chevy	DAY; 25	CAR	RCH	ATL	LVS	DAR	HCY	TEX	BRI	NSV	TAL	NHA	NZH	CLT	DOV	SBO	GLN	MLW	MYB	GTY	IRP	MCH	BRI	DAR	RCH	DOV	CLT	CAL	CAR	HOM					NC^{2}	0	
2000	Verres Racing	67	Chevy	DAY	CAR	LVS	ATL	DAR	BRI	TEX	NSV	TAL	CAL	RCH	NHA	CLT	DOV	SBO	MYB	GLN; 34	MLW	NZH	PPR	GTY	IRP	MCH	BRI	DAR	RCH	DOV	CLT	CAR	MEM	PHO	HOM			NC^{2}	0	
2003	PF2 Motorsports	94	Chevy	DAY	CAR	LVS	DAR	BRI	TEX	TAL	NSH	CAL	RCH	GTY	NZH	CLT	DOV	NSH	KEN	MLW	DAY	CHI	NHA	PPR	IRP; 38	MCH	BRI	DAR	RCH	DOV	KAN	CLT	MEM	ATL	PHO	CAR	HOM	146th	49	

==== Craftsman Truck Series ====
NASCAR Craftsman Truck Series results
Year	Team	No.	Make	1	2	3	4	5	6	7	8	9	10	11	12	13	14	15	16	17	18	19	20	21	22	23	24	25	NCTSC	Pts	Ref
2003	Team Racing	25	Chevy	DAY	DAR	MMR	MAR	CLT; 36	DOV										BRI; 32				LVS; 35						31st	800	
2003	Team Racing	23	Chevy							TEX; 33	MEM; 34	MLW	KAN	KEN	GTW					RCH; 36				SBO; 34				HOM; DNQ	31st	800	
2003	Team Racing	86	Chevy													MCH; 24	IRP	NSH			NHA; 17	CAL			TEX; QL^{†}	MAR; 24	PHO; 26		31st	800	
^{†} - Qualified but replaced by Shane Wallace

^{2} Competed only in companion events with Busch North Series as BNS driver and ineligible for Busch Series points

Sporting positions
Preceded by Joey Kourafas	NASCAR Busch North Series champion 1988, 1989, 1990	Succeeded by Ricky Craven
