= Eric Jones (racing driver) =

American racing driver

- Born: July 12, 1977 (age 49); Granger, Iowa, U.S.

NASCAR O'Reilly Auto Parts Series career
- 9 races run over 6 years
- Best finish: 93rd (2002)
- First race: 1998 Carquest Auto Parts 250 (Gateway)
- Last race: 2005 Meijer 300 (Kentucky)
Wins	Top tens	Poles
0	0	0

NASCAR FedEx Freight Truck Series career
- 27 races run over 4 years
- Best finish: 27th (2003)
- First race: 2001 GNC Live Well 200 (Milwaukee)
- Last race: 2004 Silverado 350K (Texas)
Wins	Top tens	Poles
0	1	0

Eric Jones (born July 12, 1977) is an American former part-time NASCAR driver. He ran in the Busch Series and had some of his best success in the Craftsman Truck Series. He won one NASCAR Midwest Series race before moving up to major NASCAR.

== Motorsports career results ==
=== NASCAR ===
(key) (Bold – Pole position awarded by qualifying time. Italics – Pole position earned by points standings or practice time. * – Most laps led.)

==== Busch Series ====
NASCAR Busch Series results
Year	Team	No.	Make	1	2	3	4	5	6	7	8	9	10	11	12	13	14	15	16	17	18	19	20	21	22	23	24	25	26	27	28	29	30	31	32	33	34	35	NBSC	Pts	Ref
1998	Adrian Carriers Racing	70	Chevy	DAY	CAR	LVS	NSV	DAR	BRI	TEX	HCY	TAL	NHA	NZH	CLT	DOV	RCH	PPR	GLN	MLW	MYB	CAL	SBO	IRP	MCH	BRI	DAR	RCH	DOV	CLT	GTY; 36	CAR	ATL	HOM					115th	55	
1999	Adrian Carriers Racing	70	Chevy	DAY	CAR	LVS; DNQ	ATL	DAR	TEX	NSV	BRI	TAL	CAL	NHA	RCH	NZH	CLT	DOV	SBO	GLN; 44	MLW	MYB	PPR	GTY; DNQ	IRP	MCH	BRI	DAR	RCH	DOV	CLT	CAR	MEM	PHO	HOM				136th	31	
2001	Means Racing	52	Chevy	DAY	CAR	LVS	ATL	DAR	BRI	TEX	NSH	TAL	CAL	RCH	NHA	NZH	CLT	DOV	KEN	MLW	GLN	CHI	GTY; 39	PPR	IRP	MCH	BRI	DAR	RCH	DOV	KAN	CLT	MEM	PHO	CAR	HOM			138th	46	
2002	Means Racing	52	Chevy	DAY	CAR	LVS	DAR	BRI	TEX	NSH	TAL	CAL	RCH	NHA	NZH	CLT	DOV	NSH	KEN	MLW	DAY	CHI	GTY; 43	PPR	IRP	MCH	BRI	DAR	RCH	DOV									93rd	119	
2002	Moy Racing	77	Ford																												KAN; 26	CLT	MEM	ATL	CAR	PHO	HOM		93rd	119	
2004	Griffin Racing	73	Chevy	DAY	CAR	LVS	DAR	BRI	TEX	NSH	TAL	CAL	GTY	RCH	NZH	CLT	DOV	NSH	KEN	MLW	DAY	CHI	NHA	PPR	IRP	MCH	BRI	CAL	RCH	DOV	KAN; 23	CLT	MEM	ATL	PHO; DNQ	DAR	HOM; 41		105th	134	
2005	Griffin Racing	73	Chevy	DAY	CAL; DNQ	MXC; 29	LVS; DNQ	ATL	NSH	BRI	TEX	PHO	TAL	DAR	RCH	CLT	DOV	NSH																					102nd	122	
2005	Sadler Brothers Racing	95	Dodge																KEN; 39	MLW	DAY	CHI	NHA	PPR	GTY	IRP	GLN	MCH	BRI	CAL	RCH	DOV	KAN	CLT	MEM	TEX	PHO	HOM	102nd	122	

==== Craftsman Truck Series ====
NASCAR Craftsman Truck Series results
Year	Team	No.	Make	1	2	3	4	5	6	7	8	9	10	11	12	13	14	15	16	17	18	19	20	21	22	23	24	25	NCTC	Pts	Ref
2001	Ron Jones Racing	34	Chevy	DAY	HOM	MMR	MAR	GTY	DAR	PPR	DOV	TEX	MEM	MLW; 29	KAN	KEN	NHA	IRP	NSH	CIC; 30	NZH	RCH	SBO	TEX; DMQ	LVS; 23	PHO; DNQ	CAL; 28		54th	426	
2002	Ron Jones Racing	34	Chevy	DAY	DAR	MAR	GTY	PPR	DOV	TEX	MEM; DNQ	MLW; 32	KAN; 17	KEN; 30	NHA	MCH; 22	IRP	NSH; 24	RCH	TEX	SBO	LVS; 21	CAL; 22	PHO; 35	HOM; 36				29th	730	
2003	Ron Jones Racing	34	Chevy	DAY; DNQ	DAR	MMR	MAR																						27th	1058	
2003	Team EJP	03	Chevy					CLT; 16	DOV	TEX; 11	MEM	MLW; 17	KAN; 6	KEN	GTW	MCH; 18	IRP; DNQ	NSH	BRI	RCH	NHA; 26	CAL	LVS; 16	SBO	TEX; 14	MAR	PHO	HOM; 14	27th	1058	
2004	Team Chick Motorsports	74	Chevy	DAY	ATL	MAR	MFD	CLT	DOV	TEX	MEM	MLW	KAN; 17	KEN; 24	GTW	MCH	IRP	NSH	BRI	RCH	NHA	LVS; 25	CAL; 32	TEX; 20	MAR	PHO	DAR	HOM; DNQ	42nd	461	

=== ARCA Bondo/Mar-Hyde Series ===
(key) (Bold – Pole position awarded by qualifying time. Italics – Pole position earned by points standings or practice time. * – Most laps led.)

ARCA Bondo/Mar-Hyde Series results
Year	Team	No.	Make	1	2	3	4	5	6	7	8	9	10	11	12	13	14	15	16	17	18	19	20	21	ABMHSC	Pts	Ref
1998	Larry Clement Racing	6	Chevy	DAY	ATL	SLM	AND	CLT	MCH	POC	TOL	SBS	BLN	POC	KIL	FRS	FLM	ISF	WIN; 8	DSF	SLM	CLT	TAL		NA	-	
1998	Adrian Carriers Racing	30	Chevy																					ATL; 24	NA	-	
2000		40		DAY; DNQ	SLM; DNQ	AND; DNQ	CLT	KIL	FRS	MCH	POC	TOL	KEN	BLN	POC	WIN	ISF	KEN	DSF	SLM	CLT	TAL	ATL		NA	-	
