= Stephen Rhodes (racing driver) =

American racing driver (born 1984)

- Born: March 27, 1984 (age 42); Goldsboro, North Carolina
- Achievements: 2000 Four-Cylinder Stock Division Champion, Southern National Motorsports Park; 1997 Champ Star Division Champion, Johnston County Speedway

NASCAR FedEx Freight Truck Series career
- 2 races run over 1 year
- Best finish: 87th (2003)
- First race: 2003 Lucas Oil 250 (Mesa Marin)
- Last race: 2003 Advance Auto Parts 250 (Martinsville)
Wins	Top tens	Poles
0	0	0
- Statistics up to date as of September 26, 2013.

Stephen Rhodes (born March 27, 1984) is an American stock car racing driver. A former competitor in the NASCAR Craftsman Truck Series, he is seeking to return to competition in the sport. When he made his debut in 2003, he became the first openly gay NASCAR driver, and the first openly LGBTQ NASCAR driver since Lella Lombardi in 1976.

== Personal life ==
Rhodes was born in Goldsboro, North Carolina, where he attended Rosewood High School. Rhodes is openly gay. He came out at age seventeen, one year before he made his NASCAR Truck Series debut. He co-owned Brown Bag Cafe and Matchbox Restaurant & Bar in Goldsboro with his now ex-husband, Andy Mitchell. They were married in Manhattan on July 3, 2013.

== Racing career ==
Rhodes began his racing career in 1992 at the age of eight. He started his career in go-kart racing, competing on dirt tracks before switching over to racing on asphalt-surfaced circuits. In 2001, Rhodes moved up to the NASCAR Late Model Stock Division at Southern National Motorsports Park. In 2003, Rhodes competed in two Craftsman Truck Series races, driving the No. 66 Dodge Ram for MLB Motorsports; on March 23, four days before his 19th birthday, Rhodes made his Truck Series debut in the Lucas Oil 250 at Mesa Marin Raceway, where he started 33rd and finished 30th. On April 12, Rhodes competed in the Advance Auto Parts 250 at Martinsville Speedway, where he started 32nd and finished 21st. He finished 87th in the final season point standings.

Rhodes became the first openly gay driver to compete in NASCAR, in 2003. Rhodes later returned to the NASCAR Late Model Stock Division at SNMP, where he competed until 2010. In July 2013, Rhodes stated that he was seeking to return to full-time competition in the renamed Camping World Truck Series in 2014.

== In popular media ==
Rhodes is featured in the cover story for the "Ride Review" issue of Lavender Magazine (March 19–April 1, 2015).

== Motorsports career results ==
=== NASCAR ===
(key) (Bold – Pole position awarded by qualifying time. Italics – Pole position earned by points standings or practice time. * – Most laps led.)

==== Craftsman Truck Series ====
NASCAR Craftsman Truck Series results
Year	Team	No.	Make	1	2	3	4	5	6	7	8	9	10	11	12	13	14	15	16	17	18	19	20	21	22	23	24	25	NCTC	Pts	Ref
2003	MLB Motorsports	66	Dodge	DAY	DAR	MMR; 30	MAR; 21	CLT	DOV	TEX	MEM	MLW	KAN	KEN	GTW	MCH	IRP	NSH	BRI	RCH	NHA	CAL	LVS	SBO	TEX	MAR	PHO	HOM	87th	173	

^{*} Season still in progress
^{1} Ineligible for series points

== See also ==
- List of lesbian, gay, bisexual, or transgender firsts by year
- List of LGBT sportspeople
