= Lance Hooper =

American racing driver (born 1967)

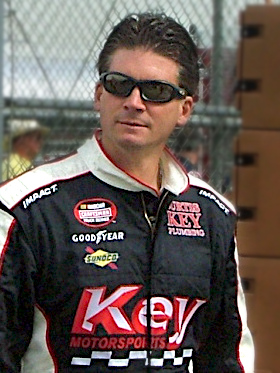
- Hooper at Auto Club Speedway in 2009
- Born: Lance Allen Hooper; June 1, 1967 (age 59); Palmdale, California, U.S.
- Achievements: 1996 Winston West Series Champion 1995 NASCAR Featherlite Southwest Tour Champion 1991, 1992 Winston Racing Series Champion
- Awards: 1996 Winston West Series Rookie of the Year 1993 NASCAR Featherlite Southwest Tour Rookie of the Year 1995 NASCAR Featherlite Southwest Tour Most Popular Driver

NASCAR Cup Series career
- 9 races run over 4 years
- Best finish: 48th (1997)
- First race: 1996 Dura Lube 500 (Phoenix)
- Last race: 2002 Sharpie 500 (Bristol)
Wins	Top tens	Poles
0	0	0

NASCAR O'Reilly Auto Parts Series career
- 22 races run over 6 years
- Best finish: 44th (1998)
- First race: 1998 Diamond Hill Plywood 200 (Darlington)
- Last race: 2004 O'Reilly 300 (Texas)
Wins	Top tens	Poles
0	0	0

NASCAR FedEx Freight Truck Series career
- 80 races run over 6 years
- Best finish: 19th (2001)
- First race: 2000 Florida Dodge Dealers 400K (Homestead)
- Last race: 2009 Ford EcoBoost 200 (Homestead)
Wins	Top tens	Poles
0	1	0
- Statistics up to date as of February 17, 2013.

Lance Allen Hooper (born June 1, 1967) is an American former race car driver and crew chief in NASCAR as well as several touring divisions. Hooper attended his first race when he was just two weeks old, and also came from a long line of racing champions, including his uncle, father, and brother. Hooper last served as the driver and crew chief of the No. 44 Key Motorsports Chevy in the Truck Series in 2009.

== Racing career ==
Hooper did not race much in 1999. He ran one Busch Series race for Jackson and made an unsuccessful attempt at the 1999 Brickyard 400 with Fenley-Moore Motorsports after replacing Jeff Davis during qualifying.

== Motorsports career results ==
=== NASCAR ===
(key) (Bold – Pole position awarded by qualifying time. Italics – Pole position earned by points standings or practice time. * – Most laps led.)

==== Winston Cup Series ====
NASCAR Winston Cup Series results
Year	Team	No.	Make	1	2	3	4	5	6	7	8	9	10	11	12	13	14	15	16	17	18	19	20	21	22	23	24	25	26	27	28	29	30	31	32	33	34	35	36	NWCC	Pts	Ref
1996	Golden West Motorsports	07	Pontiac	DAY	CAR	RCH	ATL	DAR	BRI	NWS	MAR	TAL	SON; DNQ	CLT	DOV	POC	MCH	DAY	NHA	POC	TAL	IND	GLN	MCH	BRI	DAR	RCH	DOV	MAR	NWS	CLT	CAR	PHO; 33	ATL						61st	64	
1997	Ranier-Walsh Racing	20	Ford	DAY	CAR	RCH	ATL	DAR	TEX	BRI	MAR; DNQ	SON; 42	TAL	CLT	DOV	POC	MCH	CAL	DAY	NHA	POC	IND																		48th	402	
1997	Precision Products Racing	1	Pontiac																				GLN; 24	MCH; 34	BRI; 24	DAR; 35	RCH; 33	NHA; DNQ	DOV	MAR	CLT	TAL	CAR	PHO	ATL					48th	402	
1998	Precision Products Racing	14	Pontiac	DAY	CAR	LVS	ATL	DAR	BRI	TEX	MAR	TAL	CAL	CLT	DOV	RCH	MCH	POC	SON	NHA	POC	IND; DNQ	GLN	MCH	BRI	NHA	DAR	RCH	DOV	MAR	CLT	TAL	DAY	PHO	CAR	ATL				NA	-	
1999	Fenley-Moore Motorsports	62	Ford	DAY	CAR	LVS	ATL	DAR	TEX	BRI	MAR	TAL	CAL	RCH	CLT	DOV	MCH	POC	SON	DAY	NHA	POC	IND; DNQ	GLN	MCH	BRI	DAR	RCH	NHA	DOV	MAR	CLT	TAL	CAR	PHO	HOM	ATL			NA	-	
2001	Dark Horse Motorsports	47	Ford	DAY	CAR	LVS	ATL	DAR	BRI	TEX	MAR	TAL	CAL	RCH	CLT	DOV; DNQ	MCH	POC	SON	DAY	CHI	NHA	POC	IND	GLN	MCH	BRI	DAR	RCH	DOV; DNQ	KAN	CLT	MAR	TAL	PHO	CAR	HOM			69th	37	
2001	Dark Horse Motorsports	47	Chevy																																			ATL; 42	NHA	69th	37	
2002	Donlavey Racing	90	Ford	DAY	CAR	LVS	ATL	DAR	BRI	TEX	MAR	TAL	CAL	RCH	CLT	DOV	POC	MCH	SON	DAY	CHI	NHA	POC	IND	GLN	MCH	BRI; 31	DAR	RCH	NHA	DOV	KAN	TAL	CLT	MAR	ATL	CAR			74th	70	
2002	Dark Horse Motorsports	47	Ford																																			PHO; Wth	HOM	74th	70	

==== Busch Series ====
NASCAR Busch Series results
Year	Team	No.	Make	1	2	3	4	5	6	7	8	9	10	11	12	13	14	15	16	17	18	19	20	21	22	23	24	25	26	27	28	29	30	31	32	33	34	NBGNC	Pts	Ref
1998	Precision Products Racing	23	Pontiac	DAY; DNQ	CAR; DNQ	LVS	NSV	DAR; 27	BRI; 16	TEX; 25	HCY	TAL	NHA; 41	NZH	CLT; 24	DOV; 39	RCH; 39	PPR	GLN; 21	MLW; 17	MYB	CAL; 25	SBO	IRP; 17	MCH; 30	BRI	DAR	RCH	DOV	CLT; DNQ	GTY	CAR	ATL; 34	HOM				44th	1059	
1999	Precision Products Racing	23	Pontiac	DAY; DNQ	CAR	LVS	ATL	DAR	TEX	NSV	BRI	TAL	CAL	NHA	RCH	NZH	CLT	DOV	SBO	GLN	MLW	MYB	PPR	GTY	IRP	MCH	BRI	DAR	RCH	DOV; DNQ	CLT	CAR; DNQ	MEM	PHO; 32	HOM			119th	67	
2000	Alumni Motorsports	0	Chevy	DAY	CAR	LVS	ATL	DAR	BRI	TEX	NSV	TAL	CAL; DNQ	RCH; DNQ	NHA	CLT; 43	DOV; 38	SBO; 18	MYB; DNQ	GLN	MLW; 39	NZH	PPR	GTY	IRP	MCH	BRI	DAR	RCH	DOV	CLT	CAR	MEM	PHO	HOM			79th	238	
2001	Whitaker Racing	07	Chevy	DAY	CAR	LVS	ATL	DAR	BRI	TEX	NSH	TAL	CAL	RCH	NHA	NZH	CLT	DOV	KEN	MLW; 41	GLN	CHI	GTY	PPR	IRP	MCH												134th	46	
2001	Big Fan Racing	89	Pontiac																								BRI; 39	DAR	RCH	DOV	KAN	CLT	MEM					134th	46	
2001	MacDonald Motorsports	75	Chevy																															PHO; DNQ	CAR	HOM		134th	46	
2002	Big Fan Racing	89	Chevy	DAY	CAR; DNQ	LVS	DAR	BRI	TEX	NSH	TAL	CAL	RCH	NHA	NZH	CLT	DOV; 23	NSH	KEN	MLW	DAY	CHI	GTY	PPR	IRP	MCH	BRI	DAR	RCH	DOV	KAN	CLT	MEM	ATL	CAR	PHO	HOM	100th	94	
2004	MacDonald Motorsports	72	Chevy	DAY	CAR	LVS	DAR	BRI	TEX; 35	NSH	TAL	CAL	GTY	RCH	NZH	CLT	DOV	NSH	KEN	MLW	DAY	CHI	NHA	PPR	IRP	MCH	BRI	CAL	RCH	DOV	KAN	CLT	MEM	ATL	PHO	DAR	HOM	134th	58	

==== Camping World Truck Series ====
NASCAR Camping World Truck Series results
Year	Team	No.	Make	1	2	3	4	5	6	7	8	9	10	11	12	13	14	15	16	17	18	19	20	21	22	23	24	25	26	NCWTC	Pts	Ref
1997	Gloy Racing	55	Ford	WDW	TUS; DNQ	HOM	PHO	POR	EVG	I70	NHA	TEX	BRI	NZH	MLW	LVL	CNS	HPT	IRP	FLM	NSV	GLN	RCH	MAR	SON	MMR	CAL	PHO	LVS	NA	-	
2000	Raptor Performance Motorsports	9	Ford	DAY; DNQ	HOM; 18	PHO; 16	MMR; 31	MAR; 28	PIR; 30	GTY; 20	MEM; 16	PPR; 27	EVG	TEX	KEN	GLN	MLW	NHA; 29	NZH	MCH; 28	IRP; 32	NSV	CIC; 33	RCH						28th	1199	
2000	Raptor Performance Motorsports	19	Ford																						DOV; 15	TEX	CAL			28th	1199	
2001	Raptor Performance Motorsports	9	Ford	DAY; DNQ	HOM; 15	MMR; 12	MAR; 24	GTY																						19th	1720	
2001	Sonntag Racing	73	Chevy						DAR; 30	PPR; 16	DOV; 16	TEX; 15	MEM; 22			KEN; 36	NHA	IRP		CIC; 14	NZH; 10	RCH; 17	SBO	TEX; 26	LVS; 31					19th	1720	
2001	SealMaster Racing	22	Chevy											MLW; 35	KAN															19th	1720	
2001	MacDonald Motorsports	72	Chevy																NSH; 12											19th	1720	
2001	Team 23 Racing	23	Chevy																							PHO; 36				19th	1720	
2001	Impact Motorsports	25	Chevy																								CAL; 33			19th	1720	
2002	Ware Racing Enterprises	5	Dodge	DAY; 22	DAR; 16	MAR; 16	GTY; 13	PPR; 18	DOV; 16	TEX; 15	MEM; 16	MLW; 30	KAN; 34	KEN; 19	NHA; 29															20th	2121	
2002	Team 23 Racing	23	Chevy													MCH; 20	IRP; 17													20th	2121	
2002	Team Racing	86	Chevy															NSH; 19	RCH; 18	TEX; 29	SBO; 16	LVS; 26	CAL; 34	PHO; 36	HOM; 31					20th	2121	
2003	Team Racing	86	Chevy	DAY; 20	DAR	MMR	MAR																							24th	1191	
2003	Fans Motorsports	01	Ford					CLT; 27	DOV		MEM; 32	MLW	KAN; 32	KEN; 31	GTW; 33	MCH; 27	IRP	NSH	BRI; 26	RCH; 31	NHA; 30	CAL; 32	LVS; 33	SBO; 31	TEX; 33	MAR; 32	PHO; 24	HOM; DNQ		24th	1191	
2003	Fasscore Motorsports	9	Ford							TEX; 35																				24th	1191	
2004	ThorSport Racing	13	Chevy	DAY	ATL	MAR	MFD	CLT	DOV; 33	TEX; 19	MEM; 25	MLW	KAN; 22	KEN	GTW	MCH; 20	IRP	NSH	BRI	RCH; DNQ	NHA	LVS	CAL	TEX	MAR	PHO	DAR	HOM		43rd	458	
2009	Key Motorsports	44	Chevy	DAY; 35	CAL; 36	ATL	MAR	KAN	CLT	DOV	TEX	MCH	MLW	MEM	KEN	IRP	NSH	BRI	CHI	IOW										48th	329	
2009	Tagsby Racing	65	Chevy																		GTW; 35	NHA				TEX; DNQ	PHO			48th	329	
2009	Tagsby Racing	73	Chevy																				LVS; 23	MAR	TAL			HOM; 33		48th	329	

==== Busch North Series ====
NASCAR Busch North Series results
Year	Team	No.	Make	1	2	3	4	5	6	7	8	9	10	11	12	13	14	15	16	17	18	19	20	NBNSC	Pts	Ref
1999		28		LEE	RPS	NHA	TMP	NZH	HOL	BEE	JEN	GLN	STA	NHA	NZH	STA	NHA	GLN	EPP	THU	BEE	NHA; DNQ	LRP	N/A	-	

==== Winston West Series ====
NASCAR Winston West Series results
Year	Team	No.	Make	1	2	3	4	5	6	7	8	9	10	11	12	13	14	15	Pos.	Pts	Ref
1993	Oliver Racing	00	Olds	TWS	MMR	SGS; 5	SON	TUS	SHA	EVG	POR	CBS	SSS	CAJ	TCR	MMR	PHO		40th	155	
1996	Golden West Motorsports	07	Chevy	TUS; 2															1st	2185	
1996	Golden West Motorsports	07	Pontiac		**AMP**; 1*	MMR; 7	SON; DNQ	MAD; 10	POR; 1*	TUS; 4	EVG; 4	CNS; 5	MAD; 1*	**MMR**; 16*	SON; 3	MMR; 1*	PHO; 33	LVS; 10	1st	2185	
1998	Precision Products Racing	14	Pontiac	TUS	LVS	PHO	CAL	HPT	MMR	AMP	POR	CAL; 4	PPR	EVG	SON	MMR	LVS		60th	160	
1999		39	Chevy	TUS; 8	LVS	PHO	CAL	PPR	MMR	IRW	EVG	POR	IRW	RMR	LVS	MMR	MOT		59th	142	
2000		95	Pontiac	PHO	MMR; 7	LVS	CAL	LAG	IRW	POR	EVG	IRW	RMR	MMR	IRW				47th	151	

=== ARCA Bondo/Mar-Hyde Series ===
(key) (Bold – Pole position awarded by qualifying time. Italics – Pole position earned by points standings or practice time. * – Most laps led.)

ARCA Bondo/Mar-Hyde Series results
Year	Team	No.	Make	1	2	3	4	5	6	7	8	9	10	11	12	13	14	15	16	17	18	19	20	21	22	ABSC	Pts	Ref
1998	Terry Motorsports	7	Pontiac	DAY	ATL	SLM	CLT; 11	MEM	MCH	POC	SBS	TOL	PPR	POC	KIL	FRS	ISF	ATL	DSF	SLM	TEX	WIN	CLT	TAL	ATL	NA	0	
1999	Precision Products Racing	47	Pontiac	DAY	ATL	SLM	AND	CLT; 8	MCH	POC; 30	TOL	SBS	BLN	POC; 6	KIL	FRS	FLM	ISF	WIN	DSF	SLM	CLT	TAL			50th	585	
1999		07	Chevy																					ATL; 24		50th	585	
2000	Roulo Brothers Racing	39	Pontiac	DAY	SLM	AND	CLT	KIL	FRS	MCH	POC	TOL	KEN	BLN	POC	WIN	ISF	KEN	DSF	SLM	CLT; 16	TAL	ATL; 10			65th	330	

Sporting positions
Preceded by Doug George	NASCAR Winston West Series champion 1996	Succeeded by Butch Gilliland
Preceded by Steve Portenga	NASCAR Featherlite Southwest Tour champion 1995	Succeeded by Chris Raudman
