= Jason York (racing driver) =

American racing driver

- Born: June 12, 1975 (age 51); Reidsville, North Carolina, U.S.

NASCAR FedEx Freight Truck Series career
- 2 races run over 1 year
- Best finish: 132nd (2003)
- First race: 2003 Virginia Is For Lovers 200 (Richmond)
- Last race: 2003 New Hampshire 200 (New Hampshire)
Wins	Top tens	Poles
0	0	0
- Statistics up to date as of December 22, 2024.

Jason York (born June 12, 1975) is an American professional stock car racing driver who has competed in the NASCAR Craftsman Truck Series and the NASCAR Goody's Dash Series.

York has also previously competed in series such as the CARS Late Model Stock Tour, the X-1R Pro Cup Series, the UARA STARS Late Model Series, and the IPOWER Dash Series.

== Motorsports results ==
=== NASCAR ===
(key) (Bold - Pole position awarded by qualifying time. Italics - Pole position earned by points standings or practice time. * – Most laps led.)

==== Busch Series ====
NASCAR Busch Series results
Year	Team	No.	Make	1	2	3	4	5	6	7	8	9	10	11	12	13	14	15	16	17	18	19	20	21	22	23	24	25	26	27	28	29	30	31	32	33	34	35	NBSC	Pts	Ref
2005	MacDonald Motorsports	72	Chevy	DAY	CAL	MXC	LVS	ATL	NSH	BRI	TEX	PHO	TAL	DAR	RCH	CLT	DOV	NSH	KEN	MLW	DAY	CHI	NHA	PPR	GTY	IRP	GLN	MCH	BRI	CAL	RCH; DNQ	DOV	KAN	CLT	MEM	TEX	PHO	HOM	N/A	0	

==== Craftsman Truck Series ====
NASCAR Craftsman Truck Series results
Year	Team	No.	Make	1	2	3	4	5	6	7	8	9	10	11	12	13	14	15	16	17	18	19	20	21	22	23	24	25	NCTC	Pts	Ref
2003	Troxell-MacDonald Racing	93	Chevy	DAY	DAR	MMR	MAR	CLT	DOV	TEX	MEM	MLW	KAN	KEN	GTW	MCH	IRP; DNQ	NSH	BRI										132nd	0	
2003	Ken Hunt	97	Chevy																	RCH; 17	NHA; 19	CAL	LVS; DNQ	SBO	TEX	MAR	PHO	HOM	132nd	0	

==== Goody's Dash Series ====
NASCAR Goody's Dash Series results
Year	Team	No.	Make	1	2	3	4	5	6	7	8	9	10	11	12	13	14	NGDS	Pts	Ref
2002	N/A	26	Pontiac	DAY	HAR	ROU	LON	CLT	KEN	MEM	GRE	SNM	SBO	MYB	BRI; 19	MOT	ATL	68th	106	
2003	N/A	22	Pontiac	DAY; DNQ	OGL													43rd	185	
2003	Watson Racing	12	Pontiac			CLT; 23	SBO	GRE	KEN; 24	BRI	ATL							43rd	185	

=== CARS Late Model Stock Car Tour ===
(key) (Bold – Pole position awarded by qualifying time. Italics – Pole position earned by points standings or practice time. * – Most laps led. ** – All laps led.)

CARS Late Model Stock Car Tour results
Year	Team	No.	Make	1	2	3	4	5	6	7	8	9	10	11	12	13	14	15	16	CLMSCTC	Pts	Ref
2019	Jason York	18	Chevy	SNM; DNQ	HCY	ROU	ACE; 25	MMS	LGY	DOM	CCS	HCY	ROU	SBO						61st	10	
2021	Jason York	18	Chevy	DIL	HCY	OCS	ACE	CRW; 21	LGY	DOM	HCY	MMS	TCM	FLC	WKS	SBO				62nd	12	
2022	Jason J. York Sr.	18	Chevy	CRW; 4	HCY	GRE	AAS; 21													29th	66	
2022	Jason York	18	Chevy					FCS; 21	LGY	DOM	HCY	ACE	MMS	NWS	TCM	ACE	SBO	CRW; 21		29th	66	
2023	Jason York	18	Chevy	SNM	FLC	HCY	ACE	NWS	LGY	DOM	CRW; 27	HCY	ACE	TCM	WKS	AAS	SBO	TCM	CRW	85th	6	
