= Team Racing =

American truck racing team

- Owner(s): Phil Bonifield; Tom Mazzuchi
- Base: Charlotte, North Carolina, United States
- Series: Camping World Truck Series

Career
- Drivers' Championships: 0

Team Racing was a NASCAR Camping World Truck Series team. It was owned by former driver Phil Bonifield. The team fielded multiple trucks, usually with sponsorship from Red Line Oil and the Coverall Carports.

== Truck No. 23 history ==
Team Racing made its debut in 1999 at Evergreen Speedway, under the banner Team 23 Racing. Bonifield qualified the No. 23 truck 29th but finished 30th after suffering fuel pump failure early in the race. Jerry Kobza ran the truck two races later at Memphis Motorsports Park, but dropped out early due to engine failure. Bonifield ran the truck for most of the year, posting thirteen more starts and a best finish of 30th twice, finishing 31st in points. Kobza was supposed to share the ride with Bonifield during the season, but did not qualify for his attempts and soon left the team. David Starr ran two races in the 23 at Portland and Watkins Glen, finishing 31st and 29th, respectively. Boris Said also drove in a one-race deal at Richmond International Raceway, finishing seventeenth, and Tom Bambard ran the 23 at California Speedway, finishing 22nd. Rick McCray attempted Texas Motor Speedway, but failed to qualify.

The team returned in 2000, with Bonifield as the primary driver. He ran eight races and had a best finish of 30th at Nazareth Speedway. Carl Long ran at Texas and finished seventeenth, and Bill Lester ran at Portland, finishing 24th. In 2001, Bonifield started the year running the 23, but moved over to pilot trucks owned by Impact Motorsports. Dana White took over at Memphis Motorsports Park, finishing 20th. Lance Hooper and Michael Dokken both ran one race apiece in the 23, before Bonifield finished out the year for the team.

Bonifield’s best finish in seven starts the No. 23 in 2002 was 31st at Milwaukee. Emerson Newton-John ran the truck for one race at Loudon, finishing 31st. Hooper ran the truck for a pair of races, before White, Bonifield, and Wayne Edwards took over for the rest of the year.

In 2003, White and Bonifield started out the year, before Jamie Aube took over briefly. Bonifield ran thirteen races in the 23 that season, his best finish 24th at Kentucky Speedway, White’s best finish was 32nd at Las Vegas Motor Speedway, and Aube’s best run a 33rd at Texas. Alex Müller also ran a race at Indianapolis Raceway Park, finishing 26th. At the end of the season, the 23 team stopped running in the Truck series, as its equipment was sold to Bill Davis Racing.

=== Truck No. 23 results ===
Year	Driver	No.	Make	1	2	3	4	5	6	7	8	9	10	11	12	13	14	15	16	17	18	19	20	21	22	23	24	25	26	27	NCTC	Pts
1997	Brett Bodine	11	Chevy	WDW	TUS	HOM	PHO	POR	EVG	I70	NHA	TEX	BRI	NZH	MLW	LVL	CNS	HPT	IRP	FLM	NSV	GLN	RCH	MAR	SON	MMR	CAL	PHO	LVS; DNQ			
1998	Brett Bodine	11	Chevy	WDW; 32	HOM	PHO	POR	EVG	I70	GLN	TEX												RCH; 32	MEM								
1998	Brett Bodine	71	Chevy																							MAR; 35						
1998	Ken Bouchard	11	Chevy									BRI; 16	MLW; DNQ	NZH; 17	CAL	PPR	IRP	NHA	FLM	NSV	HPT											
1998	Brandon Sperling	11	Chevy																			LVL; 30						MMR; 18				
1998	Matt Hutter	11	Chevy																						GTY; 22							
1998	Randy Tolsma	11	Chevy																								SON; 19					
1998	Scott Hansen	11	Chevy																										PHO; 31	LVS; 39		
1999	Nelson Richardson	23	Chevy	HOM	PHO; 31		MMR; 31	MAR																								
1999	Phil Bonifield	23	Chevy			EVG; 30				PPR; 35	I70; 32	BRI; 32	TEX; 32			MLW; 33	NSV; 34	NZH; 33	MCH; 30	NHA; 32	IRP; 32	GTY; 31	HPT; 34	RCH; QL	LVS; 34	LVL; DNQ						
1999	Jerry Kobza	23	Chevy						MEM; 35																							
1999	David Starr	23	Chevy											PIR; 31	GLN; 29																	
1999	Boris Said	23	Ford																					RCH; 17								
1999	Rick McCray	23	Chevy																								TEX; DNQ					
1999	Tom Bambard	23	Chevy																									CAL; 22				
2000	Phil Bonifield	23	Chevy	DAY; DNQ	HOM	PHO; 35	MMR; 32	MAR			MEM; DNQ	PPR; 35	EVG; 31		KEN; 33	GLN; DNQ	MLW	NHA	NZH; 30	MCH; 34		NSV; DNQ	CIC; DNQ				CAL; 36					
2000	Bill Lester	23	Chevy						PIR; 24															RCH; DNQ	DOV							
2000	Morgan Shepherd	23	Chevy							GTY; DNQ											IRP; DNQ											
2000	Carl Long	23	Chevy											TEX; 17																		
2000	Richie Hearn	23	Chevy																							TEX; DNQ						
2001	Loni Richardson	23	Chevy	DAY	HOM; 31	MMR; 34																										
2001	Dana White	23	Chevy				MAR; DNQ						MEM; 20																			
2001	Phil Bonifield	23	Chevy					GTY; 35		PPR; 33	DOV; 34	TEX; 31		MLW; 31	KAN; 31	KEN; DNQ	NHA; 32	IRP	NSH	CIC	NZH	RCH	SBO	TEX			CAL; DNQ					
2001	Ron Barfield Jr.	23	Chevy						DAR; 22																							
2001	Michael Dokken	23	Chevy																						LVS; DNQ							
2001	Lance Hooper	23	Chevy																							PHO; 36						
2002	Phil Bonifield	23	Chevy	DAY	DAR; DNQ	MAR	GTY; DNQ	PPR; 35	DOV; DNQ	TEX	MEM; 34	MLW; 31	KAN; 31	KEN; 32				NSH; DNQ		TEX; 33				PHO; 34								
2002	Emerson Newton-John	23	Chevy												NHA; 31																	
2002	Lance Hooper	23	Chevy													MCH; 20	IRP; 17															
2002	Dana White	23	Chevy																RCH; DNQ		SBO; 30	LVS; 34			HOM; DNQ							
2002	Wayne Edwards	23	Chevy																				CAL; 32									
2003	Phil Bonifield	23	Chevy	DAY; 34				CLT; DNQ	DOV; 29			MLW; 32	KAN; 28	KEN; 25	GTW; 30	MCH; 32		NSH; 28	BRI; 35		NHA; 32				TEX; 32	MAR; 35	PHO; 29					
2003	Dana White	23	Chevy		DAR; 34	MMR; 33	MAR; DNQ															CAL; 31	LVS; 31									
2003	Jamie Aube	23	Chevy							TEX; 33	MEM; 34									RCH; 36				SBO; 34				HOM; DNQ				
2003	Alex Müller	23	Chevy														IRP; 26															

== Truck No. 25 history ==
The 25 truck made its debut in 2002 after Bonifield purchased Impact's equipment when the team closed its doors. The organization, newly named Team Racing, debuted the 25 truck at the MBNA America 200. Ronnie Hornaday started and finished 28th after suffering engine failure. Dokken, Brian Tyler, White, Brian Rose, and Barry Bodine all ran one race apiece in the 25 before Bonifield finished out the year for the team. The 25 truck made its debut the next season when Aube finished 36th at Lowe's Motor Speedway. Wayne Edwards took over for a pair of races, his best finish 36th at Texas. Aube also ran two races in the 25, his best finish 35th at Las Vegas. In 2004, Bonifield ran four races in the 25, before the team closed its doors.

=== Truck No. 25 results ===
Year	Driver	No.	Make	1	2	3	4	5	6	7	8	9	10	11	12	13	14	15	16	17	18	19	20	21	22	23	24	25	NCTC	Pts
2002	Ronnie Hornaday	25	Chevy	DAY	DAR	MAR	GTY	PPR	DOV; 28	TEX	MEM	MLW	KAN	KEN																
2002	Michael Dokken	25	Chevy											KEN; 36	NHA															
2002	Brian Tyler	25	Chevy													MCH; 35	IRP													
2002	Dana White	25	Chevy															NSH; 34	RCH											
2002	Barry Bodine	25	Chevy																	TEX; 31	SBO									
2002	Brian Rose	25	Chevy																			LVS; 35								
2002	Phil Bonifield	25	Chevy																				CAL; 31	PHO	HOM; DNQ					
2003	Jamie Aube	25	Chevy	DAY	DAR	MMR	MAR	CLT; 36	DOV										BRI; 32	RCH	NHA	CAL	LVS; 35	SBO	TEX	MAR	PHO			
2003	Wayne Edwards	25	Chevy							TEX; 36	MEM	MLW	KAN; DNQ	KEN																
2003	Michael Dokken	25	Chevy												GTW; 34	MCH	IRP	NSH												
2003	Dana White	25	Chevy																									HOM; DNQ		
2004	Phil Bonifield	25	Chevy	DAY; DNQ	ATL	MAR	MFD	CLT	DOV; 34	TEX; 33	MEM	MLW	KAN; 33	KEN	GTW	MCH; 33	IRP	NSH	BRI	RCH	NHA	LVS	CAL	TEX	MAR	PHO	DAR	HOM		

== Truck No. 86 history ==
Like the 25, Bonifield and Mazzuchi purchased the 86's equipment from the defunct Impact Motorsports in 2002. Under the Team Racing banner, the 86 made its debut in the beginning of 2002 at the Florida Dodge Dealers 250 with Bonifield driving. He finished 35th. Wayne Edwards made two starts in the 86 in 2002, his best finish 25th at the Darlington 200. Then White drove the 86 for six races, his best finish a 24th twice. Donnie Neuenberger also attempted a race, but failed to qualify. Lance Hooper finished the year in the 86, his best finish a sixteenth at South Boston Speedway. After Hooper left during Daytona 2003, Bonifield drove the 86 in eight races, his best finish a 23rd in Memphis. Rookie T. J. Bell took over for nine races. His best finish was 12th at Dover, the best finish a Team Racing driver ever posted. Brad Teague finished sixteenth at Bristol in a one-race deal, and Shane Wallace had a 26th-place finish at Texas, before Aube and Bonifield finished out the year in the truck. The team dissolved at the end of the season, despite finishing in 20th in owner's points. In 2007, the team purchased equipment from R3 Racing, and returned at the Quaker State & Lube 200 with Clay Rogers finishing 35th after a clutch failure. Dana White and Kevin Lepage drove in several races for Team Racing as well that season.

=== Truck No. 86 results ===
Year	Driver	No.	Make	1	2	3	4	5	6	7	8	9	10	11	12	13	14	15	16	17	18	19	20	21	22	23	24	25	NCTC	Pts
2002	Phil Bonifield	86	Chevrolet	DAY; 35						TEX; 34						MCH; 33														
2002	Wayne Edwards	86	Chevrolet		DAR; 25								KAN; 36																	
2002	Dana White	86	Chevrolet			MAR; DNQ	GTY; 29	PPR; 32			MEM; 30	MLW; 25		KEN; DNQ	NHA; 24		IRP; 24													
2002	Donnie Neuenberger	86	Chevrolet						DOV; DNQ																					
2002	Lance Hooper	86	Chevrolet															NSH; 19	RCH; 18	TEX; 29	SBO; 16	LVS; 26	CAL; 34	PHO; 36	HOM; 31					
2003	Lance Hooper	86	Chevrolet	DAY; 20																										
2003	Phil Bonifield	86	Chevrolet		DAR; 29					TEX; 28	MEM; 23									RCH; 35		CAL; 31	LVS; 31	SBO; 30				HOM; 25		
2003	T. J. Bell	86	Chevrolet			MMR; 18	MAR; 28		DOV; 12			MLW; 28	KAN; 25	KEN; 29	GTW; 28		IRP; 25	NSH; 26												
2003	Dana White	86	Chevrolet					CLT; 35																						
2003	Jamie Aube	86	Chevrolet													MCH; 24					NHA; 17				TEX; QL	MAR; 24	PHO; 26			
2003	Brad Teague	86	Ford																BRI; 16											
2003	Shane Wallace	86	Ford																						TEX; 26					
2007	Clay Rogers	86	Chevy	DAY	CAL	ATL	MAR	KAN	CLT; 33	MFD																				
2007	Dana White	86	Chevy								DOV; 32	TEX			MEM; 34	KEN	IRP	NSH	BRI	GTW; 33	NHA	LVS; 33	TAL	MAR	ATL					
2007	Kevin Lepage	86	Chevy										MCH; 36	MLW												TEX; 35	PHO	HOM; DNQ		
