= David Stover =

David Stover may refer to:

- David Stover (racing driver)
- David Stover (politician) - state legislator from West Virginia
