= 2003 NASCAR Craftsman Truck Series =

American motorsport season

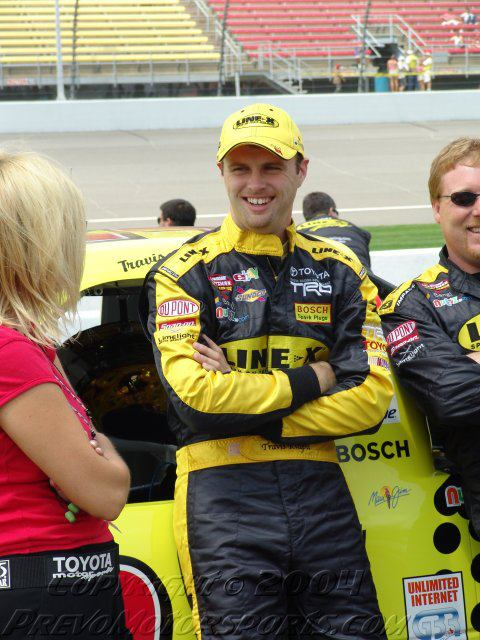
Travis Kvapil, shown here in 2004, the 2003 Craftsman Truck Series champion.

The 2003 NASCAR Craftsman Truck Series season was the ninth season of the pickup truck racing series sanctioned by NASCAR. The season included twenty-five races, beginning with the Florida Dodge Dealers 250 at Daytona International Speedway and ending with the Ford 200 at Homestead–Miami Speedway. Steve Coulter won the Owners' Championship, while Travis Kvapil won the Drivers' Championship during the final race of the season at Homestead-Miami Speedway. Dodge won the Manufacturers' Championship with 179 points.

== 2003 teams and drivers ==
=== Full-time teams ===
Manufacturer	Team	No.	Driver(s)	Crew chief
Chevrolet	Morgan-Dollar Motorsports	46	Dennis Setzer	Danny Gill
Chevrolet	SealMaster Racing	88	Matt Crafton 24	Jerry Cook
Chevrolet	SealMaster Racing	88	Buddy Rice 1	Jerry Cook
Chevrolet	Spears Motorsports	75	David Starr 21	Dave McCarty
Chevrolet	Spears Motorsports	75	Hank Parker Jr. 4	Dave McCarty
Chevrolet	Team Racing	23	Phil Bonifield 14	Tom Mazzuchi
Chevrolet	Team Racing	23	Dana White 5	Tom Mazzuchi
Chevrolet	Team Racing	23	Jamie Aube 5	Tom Mazzuchi
Chevrolet	Team Racing	23	Alex Mueller 1	Tom Mazzuchi
Chevrolet	Troxell-MacDonald Racing	93	Michael Dokken 4	Lonnie Troxell
Chevrolet	Troxell-MacDonald Racing	93	Teri MacDonald 1 (R)	Lonnie Troxell
Chevrolet	Troxell-MacDonald Racing	93	Trevor Boys 1	Lonnie Troxell
Chevrolet	Troxell-MacDonald Racing	93	Dana White 1	Lonnie Troxell
Chevrolet	Troxell-MacDonald Racing	93	Roland Isaacs 10 (R)	Lonnie Troxell
Chevrolet	Troxell-MacDonald Racing	93	Jason White 1	Lonnie Troxell
Chevrolet	Troxell-MacDonald Racing	93	Jonathon Price 3	Lonnie Troxell
Chevrolet	Troxell-MacDonald Racing	93	Jon Lemke 1	Lonnie Troxell
Chevrolet	Troxell-MacDonald Racing	93	Jason York 1	Lonnie Troxell
Chevrolet	Troxell-MacDonald Racing	93	Aaron Daniel 1	Lonnie Troxell
Chevrolet	Troxell-MacDonald Racing	93	Jerry Allec Jr. 1	Lonnie Troxell
Chevrolet	Troxell-MacDonald Racing	93	Derrike Cope 1	Lonnie Troxell
Chevrolet	Xpress Motorsports	16	Travis Kvapil	Chris Showalter
Chevrolet	Green Light Racing	08	Bobby Dotter 2	Tommy Morgan
Chevrolet	Green Light Racing	08	Jody Lavender (R) 21	Tommy Morgan
Chevrolet	Green Light Racing	08	Shane Sieg 2	Tommy Morgan
Chevrolet	Green Light Racing	07	Rich Bickle 1	Doug Howe
Chevrolet	Green Light Racing	07	Bobby Dotter 9	Doug Howe
Chevrolet	Green Light Racing	07	Stan Boyd 2	Doug Howe
Chevrolet	Green Light Racing	07	Blake Mallory 1	Doug Howe
Chevrolet	Green Light Racing	07	Johnny Chapman 6	Doug Howe
Chevrolet	Green Light Racing	07	Ryan Hanson 1	Doug Howe
Chevrolet	Green Light Racing	07	Mark McFarland 1	Doug Howe
Chevrolet	Green Light Racing	07	Shane Sieg 2	Doug Howe
Chevrolet	Green Light Racing	07	Alex Mueller 1	Doug Howe
Dodge	Green Light Racing	07	Jeremy Mayfield 1	Doug Howe
Dodge	Bobby Hamilton Racing	4	Bobby Hamilton	Newt Moore
Dodge	Bobby Hamilton Racing	8	Bill Lester	Danny Rollins
Dodge	Bobby Hamilton Racing	18	Chad Chaffin	Randy Seals
Dodge	HT Motorsports	59	Robert Pressley	Greg Conner
Dodge	Orleans Racing	62	Brendan Gaughan	Shane Wilson
Dodge	Ultra Motorsports	1	Ted Musgrave	Gene Nead
Dodge	Ultra Motorsports	2	Jason Leffler 16	Tim Kohuth
Dodge	Ultra Motorsports	2	Jimmy Spencer 3	Tim Kohuth
Dodge	Ultra Motorsports	2	Andy Houston 6	Tim Kohuth
Ford	Circle Bar Racing	14	Rick Crawford	Ray Stonkus
Ford	K Automotive Racing	29	Terry Cook	Rick Ren
Ford	Roush Racing	50	Jon Wood	John Monsam
Ford	Roush Racing	99	Carl Edwards (R)	Doug Richert
Ford Dodge	Fasscore Motorsports	15	Andy Houston 4	Gary Showalter
Ford Dodge	Fasscore Motorsports	15	Rich Bickle 10	Gary Showalter
Ford Dodge	Fasscore Motorsports	15	Mike Skinner 4	Gary Showalter
Ford Dodge	Fasscore Motorsports	15	Ryan Hemphill 3	Gary Showalter
Ford Dodge	Fasscore Motorsports	15	Robby Benton 3	Gary Showalter
Ford Dodge	Fasscore Motorsports	15	Patrick Lawler 1	Gary Showalter
Chevrolet Ford	Team Racing	86	Lance Hooper 1	Ethan Davis
Chevrolet Ford	Team Racing	86	Phil Bonifield 8	Ethan Davis
Chevrolet Ford	Team Racing	86	T. J. Bell (R) 9	Ethan Davis
Chevrolet Ford	Team Racing	86	Jamie Aube 5 (Note: Jamie Aube made the field in the No. 86 Ford for Team Racing at Texas II (Race 22) but he was replaced in the race by Shane Wallace, who failed to qualify his No. 04 Ford for Wallace Motorsports.)	Ethan Davis
Chevrolet Ford	Team Racing	86	Brad Teague 1	Ethan Davis
Chevrolet Ford	Team Racing	86	Shane Wallace 1	Ethan Davis
Chevrolet Dodge	Troxell-MacDonald Racing	72	Randy MacDonald	Cliff Button
Chevrolet Dodge	Ware Racing Enterprises	5	Jerry Hill 22	Doug Taylor
Chevrolet Dodge	Ware Racing Enterprises	5	Brian Sockwell 1	Doug Taylor
Chevrolet Dodge	Ware Racing Enterprises	5	Stan Boyd 1	Doug Taylor
Chevrolet Dodge	Ware Racing Enterprises	5	Carl Long 1	Doug Taylor

=== Part-time teams ===
Note: If under "team", the owner's name is listed and in italics, that means the name of the race team that fielded the truck is unknown.

Manufacturer	Team	No.	Driver(s)	Crew chief	Rounds
Chevrolet	2nd Chance Motorsports	79	Scott Hall	???	1
Chevrolet	Andy Petree Racing	33	Andy Petree	???	4
Chevrolet	Andy Petree Racing	33	Paul Menard	???	5
Chevrolet	Andy Petree Racing	33	Tony Stewart	???	1
Chevrolet	Bradberry Motorsports	78	Charlie Bradberry	Ted Kennedy	5
Chevrolet	Bradford Miller	68	Brandon Miller	???	3
Chevrolet	Bryan Reffner	80	Bryan Reffner	Walter Giles	2
Chevrolet	Clean Line Motorsports	38	Brandon Whitt	Jerry Pitts	7
Chevrolet	Conely Racing	7	Jay Sherston	John Conely	2
Chevrolet	Danny McCall	56	Matt McCall	???	1
Chevrolet	Dennis Sockwell	54	Brian Sockwell	Todd Hall	3
Chevrolet	Donald Thompson	92	Jeremy Thompson	???	2
Chevrolet	Hands-On Racing	94	Dennis Hannel	???	2
Chevrolet	Horn Auto Racing	58	Chris Horn	???	8
Chevrolet	Jody McCormick	77	Jody McCormick	Jeremy McCormick	2
Chevrolet	JRS Motorsports	39	Jason Small	???	4
Chevrolet	Keller Motorsports	77	Doug Keller (R)	???	1
Chevrolet	Keller Motorsports	27	Doug Keller (R)	David Bridgeman	8
Chevrolet	Keller Motorsports	27	Blake Mallory	David Bridgeman	1
Chevrolet	Ken Hunt	97	Jason York	???	3
Chevrolet	Ken Schrader Racing	52	Mike Wallace	Donnie Richeson	2
Chevrolet	Ken Schrader Racing	52	Ken Schrader	Donnie Richeson	11
Chevrolet	James Burr	87	Conrad Burr	Dan Glauz	7
Chevrolet	Kevin Harvick, Inc.	6	Ed Berrier	Wally Rogers	1
Chevrolet	Kevin Harvick, Inc.	6	Kevin Harvick	Wally Rogers	6
Chevrolet	Kevin Harvick, Inc.	6	Brandon Miller	Wally Rogers	1
Chevrolet	Kevin Harvick, Inc.	6	Randy LaJoie	Wally Rogers	1
Chevrolet	KW Racing	20	Ken Weaver	Raymond Newman	5
Chevrolet	LeRoy's Boys Racing	17	Darrell Waltrip	Bobby Kennedy; Buddy Barnes	3
Chevrolet	Mahlik Motorsports	09	Doug Mahlik	???	2
Chevrolet	McGlynn Racing	00	Ryan McGlynn	Allen Crestinger	5
Chevrolet	Midgley Racing	09	David Gilliland	Dick Midgley	1
Chevrolet	Morgan-Dollar Motorsports	47	Joe Varde	???	1
Chevrolet	MRD Motorsports	68	Jay Godley	???	2
Chevrolet	Ninety-Nine Racing, LLC	82	Gilbert King	Dan Glauz	1
Chevrolet	Ninety-Nine Racing, LLC	82	A. J. Fike	Dan Glauz	1
Chevrolet	Richardson Motorsports	0	Patrick Lawler	Larry Richardson	1
Chevrolet	Richardson Motorsports	0	Loni Richardson	Larry Richardson	5
Chevrolet	Ronald Jones	34	Eric Jones	Eddie Pearson	1
Chevrolet	RT Motorsports	13	Ray Polodna	???	4
Chevrolet	Scott Williams	98	Jarod Robie	???	1
Chevrolet	SealMaster Racing	98	Cory Kruseman	???	1
Chevrolet	SealMaster Racing	98	Matt Crafton	???	1
Chevrolet	Stellar Quest Racing	91	J. C. Stout	Steve Mollnow	4
Chevrolet	Sutton Motorsports	02	Kelly Sutton	Richard Broome	5
Chevrolet	Team EJP Racing	03	Eric Jones	Tom Pearl	10
Chevrolet	Team Racing	25	Jamie Aube	William Kehrer	3
Chevrolet	Team Racing	25	Wayne Edwards	William Kehrer	2
Chevrolet	Team Racing	25	Michael Dokken	William Kehrer	1
Chevrolet	Team Racing	25	Dana White	William Kehrer	1
Chevrolet	Team Texas Racing	49	Shawna Robinson	Mike Starr	3
Chevrolet	Troxell-MacDonald Racing	7	Stuart Kirby	???	1
Chevrolet	Xpress Motorsports	11	Jack Sprague	???	2
Chevrolet	Xpress Motorsports	11	Clay Brown	???	1
Chevrolet	Ware Racing Enterprises	51	Chase Montgomery (Note: Entry was fielded in a collaboration with Ray Montgomery Racing.)	Ken Glen	1
Dodge	Ware Racing Enterprises	51	G. J. Mennen Jr.	Ken Glen	2
Dodge	Ware Racing Enterprises	51	Rusty Alton	Ken Glen	1
Dodge	Ware Racing Enterprises	51	Stan Boyd	Ken Glen	5
Dodge	Ware Racing Enterprises	51	Brian Sockwell	Ken Glen	1
Dodge	Ware Racing Enterprises	51	Carl Long	Ken Glen	1
Dodge	Ware Racing Enterprises	51	Randy Briggs (R)	Ken Glen	2
Dodge	Ware Racing Enterprises	51	Blake Mallory	Ken Glen	1
Dodge	Ware Racing Enterprises	51	Jerry Hill	Ken Glen	1
Dodge	Ware Racing Enterprises	51	Jason Hedlesky	Ken Glen	1
Dodge	Ware Racing Enterprises	51	Doug Keller (R)	Ken Glen	1
Dodge	Ware Racing Enterprises	81	Doug Keller (R)	???	1
Dodge	Carl Long Racing	96	Matt Carter	???	1
Dodge	Carpenter Group Racing	57	Brian Rose	Patrick Wall	3
Dodge	Dean Motorsports	55	Mark McFarland	???	2
Dodge	Gerald Miller	32	Jerry Miller	Mike Seibert	1
Dodge	MLB Motorsports	36	Michael Dokken	???	1
Dodge	Orleans Racing	61	Scott Lynch	???	2
Dodge	Rick Bogart	70	Rick Bogart	???	3
Dodge	Ron Rhodes Racing	36	Trevor Boys	???	4
Dodge	Ron Rhodes Racing	36	Blake Mallory	???	1
Dodge	Ron Rhodes Racing	36	Pete Harding	???	1
Dodge	Ultra Motorsports	7	Tyler Walker	Matt Puccia	3
Dodge	Ultra Motorsports	7	Stuart Kirby	Matt Puccia	1
Dodge	Ultra Motorsports	7	Tracy Hines	Matt Puccia	3
Dodge	Ultra Motorsports	27	Tracy Hines	???	1
Dodge	Ultra Motorsports	27	P. J. Jones	???	1
Ford	Alvin Thompson	36	Geoff Bodine	Walter Giles	2
Ford	Alvin Thompson	36	James Stephenson	Walter Giles	1
Ford	Borneman Motorsports	81	Johnny Borneman III	Kevin Cram	1
Ford	Capital City Motorsports	83	Willie Green	???	1
Ford	Craig Wood	11; 73	Craig Wood	???	4
Ford	Dan Higgs	67	Gary Higgs	???	1
Ford	Fans Motorsports	01	Lance Hooper	Dan Kolanda	16
Ford	Fasscore Motorsports	9	Rich Bickle	???	1
Ford	Fasscore Motorsports	9	Andy Houston	???	1
Ford	Fasscore Motorsports	9	Lance Hooper	???	1
Ford	Fasscore Motorsports	9	Kenny Hendrick (R)	???	13
Ford	Fasscore Motorsports	9	Steadman Marlin	???	1
Ford	Fasscore Motorsports	9	Johnny Sauter	???	3
Ford	Four-Tech Racing	81	Danny Bagwell	???	1
Ford	J&J Motorsports	70	Andy Ponstein	???	2
Ford	Ken Davis	65	Nathan Wulff	???	4
Ford	Long Brothers Racing	84	Nick Woodward	Charlie Long	1
Ford	Long Brothers Racing	84	Elliott Sadler	Charlie Long	1
Ford	MB Motorsports	63	Ronnie Hornaday	Mike Mittler	2
Ford	MB Motorsports	63	David Stover	Mike Mittler	8
Ford	Pro Motion Motorsports	35	Jason White	???	1
Ford	Pro Motion Motorsports	35	L. W. Miller	???	1
Ford	Pro Motion Motorsports	35	Tim Sauter (Note: All of Tim Sauter's races with the team were fielded in a collaboration with Gary Keller Racing.)	???	2
Ford	Pro Motion Motorsports	35	Randy Briggs (R)	???	1
Ford	Ricky Sanders Racing	19	Ricky Sanders	???	9
Ford	Spraker Racing Enterprises	69	Frank Kimmel	???	1
Ford	Team Chick Motorsports	11	Aaron Daniel	Bud Haefele; Steve Chick Jr.	5
Ford	Tim Woods III	54	Tim Woods III	???	4
Ford	Upshaw Racing	19	Wayne Edwards	???	1
Ford	Upshaw Racing	94	Conrad Burr	???	1
Ford	Upshaw Racing	95	Wayne Edwards	Earl Ramey	7
Ford	Victory in Jesus Racing	21	Morgan Shepherd	Carl Saylor	16
Ford	Wallace Motorsports	04	Shane Wallace	Darren Shaw	7
Chevrolet Dodge Ford	Brevak Racing	31	Tina Gordon (R)	Todd Myers; Kevin Cram	13
Chevrolet Dodge Ford	Brevak Racing	31	Tommy Pistone	Todd Myers; Kevin Cram	1
Chevrolet Dodge Ford	Brevak Racing	31	Dallas Norman (Note: Dallas Norman made the field in the No. 31 Ford for Brevak Racing at Martinsville II (Race 23) but he was replaced in the race by Wayne Edwards, who failed to qualify his No. 95 Ford for Upshaw Racing.)	Todd Myers; Kevin Cram	1
Chevrolet Dodge Ford	Brevak Racing	31	Wayne Edwards	Todd Myers; Kevin Cram	1
Chevrolet Dodge Ford	Brevak Racing	31	Mike Wallace	Todd Myers; Kevin Cram	2
Chevrolet Dodge Ford	Pro Motion Motorsports	53	Randy Briggs (R)	Calvin Humphries	16
Chevrolet Dodge Ford	Pro Motion Motorsports	53	Tim Sauter	Calvin Humphries	1
Chevrolet Dodge Ford	Pro Motion Motorsports	53	T. J. Bell (R)	Calvin Humphries	3
Dodge Ford	Bobby Sands Racing	47	Scotty Sands	???	2
Dodge Ford	Fast Track Racing (Note: Entry was fielded in a collaboration with Gary Keller Racing at Kentucky (Race 11) and with Ultra Motorsports at Homestead (Race 25).)	10	Andy Hillenburg	???	2
Dodge Ford	Fast Track Racing	10	Marty Houston	???	1
Chevrolet Ford	FDNY Racing	28	L. W. Miller	Bob Rahilly	5
Chevrolet Ford	FDNY Racing	28	Tommy Pistone	Tom Pistone	1
Dodge Chevrolet	EVI Motorsports	89	Stan Boyd	Ed Huckabee	6
Dodge Chevrolet	MLB Motorsports	66	Michael Dokken (Note: Michael Dokken made the field in the No. 66 Dodge for MLB Motorsports at Milwaukee (Race 9) but he was replaced in the race by Trevor Boys, who failed to qualify his No. 36 Dodge for Ron Rhodes Racing.)	???	2
Dodge Chevrolet	MLB Motorsports	66	Randy Renfrow	???	3
Dodge Chevrolet	MLB Motorsports	66	Stephen Rhodes	???	2
Dodge Chevrolet	MLB Motorsports	66	Donnie Neuenberger	???	2
Dodge Chevrolet	MLB Motorsports	66	Trevor Boys	???	3
Dodge Chevrolet	MLB Motorsports	66	Blake Mallory	???	2
Dodge Chevrolet	MLB Motorsports	66	Rick Ware	???	1
Dodge Chevrolet	MLB Motorsports	66	Casey Kingsland	???	1

== Schedule ==
No.	Race title	Track	Date
1	Florida Dodge Dealers 250	Daytona International Speedway, Daytona Beach	February 14
2	Craftsman 200	Darlington Raceway, Darlington	March 14
3	Lucas Oil 250 presented by Glidden	Mesa Marin Raceway, Bakersfield	March 23
4	Advance Auto Parts 250	Martinsville Speedway, Ridgeway	April 12
5	Hardee's 200	Lowe's Motor Speedway, Concord	May 16
6	MBNA Armed Forces Family 200	Dover International Speedway, Dover	May 30
7	O'Reilly 400K	Texas Motor Speedway, Fort Worth	June 6
8	O'Reilly 200	Memphis International Raceway, Millington	June 21
9	GNC 200	The Milwaukee Mile, West Allis	June 28
10	O'Reilly Auto Parts 250	Kansas Speedway, Kansas City	July 5
11	Built Ford Tough 225	Kentucky Speedway, Sparta	July 12
12	Missouri-Illinois Dealers Ram Tough 200	Gateway International Raceway, Madison	July 19
13	Sears 200	Michigan International Speedway, Brooklyn	July 26
14	Power Stroke Diesel 200	Indianapolis Raceway Park, Brownsburg	August 1
15	Federated Auto Parts 200	Nashville Superspeedway, Lebanon	August 8
16	O'Reilly 200 presented by Valvoline Maxlife	Bristol Motor Speedway, Bristol	August 20
17	Virginia Is For Lovers 200	Richmond International Raceway, Richmond	September 4
18	New Hampshire 200	New Hampshire International Speedway, Loudon	September 13
19	American Racing Wheels 200	California Speedway, Fontana	September 20
20	Las Vegas 350	Las Vegas Motor Speedway, Las Vegas	September 27
21	John Boy & Billy 250	South Boston Speedway, South Boston	October 4
22	Silverado 350	Texas Motor Speedway, Fort Worth	October 11
23	Advance Auto Parts 200	Martinsville Speedway, Ridgeway	October 18
24	Chevy Silverado 150	Phoenix International Raceway, Phoenix	October 31
25	Ford 200	Homestead-Miami Speedway, Homestead	November 14

== Races ==
=== Florida Dodge Dealers 250 ===
The Florida Dodge Dealers 250 was held February 14 at Daytona International Speedway. Jason Leffler won the pole.

Top ten results

1. 14-Rick Crawford
2. 16-Travis Kvapil
3. 59-Robert Pressley
4. 4-Bobby Hamilton
5. 15-Andy Houston
6. 52-Mike Wallace
7. 46-Dennis Setzer
8. 50-Jon Wood
9. 29-Terry Cook
10. 62-Brendan Gaughan

Failed to qualify: Eric Jones (#34), Geoff Bodine (#36), Brian Rose (#57), Ricky Sanders (#19)

=== Craftsman 200 ===
The Craftsman 200 was held March 14 at Darlington Raceway. Travis Kvapil won the pole.

Top ten results

1. 4-Bobby Hamilton
2. 1-Ted Musgrave
3. 62-Brendan Gaughan
4. 16-Travis Kvapil
5. 18-Chad Chaffin
6. 2-Jason Leffler
7. 14-Rick Crawford
8. 29-Terry Cook
9. 75-David Starr
10. 59-Robert Pressley

Failed to qualify: none

=== Lucas Oil 250 presented by Glidden ===
The Lucas Oil 250 presented by Glidden was held March 23 at Mesa Marin Raceway. Ted Musgrave won the pole. Stephen Rhodes made his debut in this race, becoming the first openly gay person to compete in an official NASCAR event. Rhodes started 33th, and finished 30th. This was the last Truck Series race to be held at Mesa Marin.

Top ten results

1. 46-Dennis Setzer
2. 50-Jon Wood
3. 62-Brendan Gaughan
4. 4-Bobby Hamilton
5. 1-Ted Musgrave
6. 14-Rick Crawford
7. 2-Jason Leffler
8. 6-Brandon Miller
9. 75-David Starr
10. 29-Terry Cook

Failed to qualify: none

=== Advance Auto Parts 250 ===
The Advance Auto Parts 250 was held April 12 at Martinsville Speedway. Ted Musgrave won the pole.

Top ten results

1. 46-Dennis Setzer
2. 1-Ted Musgrave
3. 6-Kevin Harvick
4. 99-Carl Edwards
5. 4-Bobby Hamilton
6. 14-Rick Crawford
7. 17-Darrell Waltrip
8. 9-Rich Bickle
9. 29-Terry Cook
10. 33-Andy Petree

Failed to qualify: Conrad Burr (#87), Tina Gordon (#31), Dana White (#23), James Stephenson (#36), Randy Briggs (#53), Doug Keller (#27), Craig Wood (#11), Jody McCormick (#77), Ron Polodna (#13)

- Dana White replaced Roland Isaacs in the #93 car in the race, after failing to qualify his #23.

=== Hardee's 200 ===
The Hardee's 200 was held May 16 at Lowe's Motor Speedway. Bill Lester won the pole.

Top ten results

1. 1-Ted Musgrave
2. 62-Brendan Gaughan
3. 14-Rick Crawford
4. 16-Travis Kvapil
5. 6-Kevin Harvick
6. 07-Jeremy Mayfield
7. 4-Bobby Hamilton
8. 18-Chad Chaffin
9. 88-Matt Crafton
10. 15-Rich Bickle

Failed to qualify: Michael Dokken (#93), Phil Bonifield (#23)

=== MBNA Armed Forces Family 200 ===
The MBNA Armed Forces Family 200 was held May 30 at Dover International Speedway. Bobby Hamilton won the pole.

Top ten results

1. 2-Jason Leffler
2. 4-Bobby Hamilton
3. 75-David Starr
4. 50-Jon Wood
5. 16-Travis Kvapil
6. 52-Ken Schrader
7. 18-Chad Chaffin
8. 14-Rick Crawford
9. 46-Dennis Setzer
10. 59-Robert Pressley

Failed to qualify: none

- This was Leffler's only Truck series victory.

=== O'Reilly 400K ===
The O'Reilly 400K was held June 6 at Texas Motor Speedway. Bobby Hamilton won the pole.

Top ten results

1. 62-Brendan Gaughan
2. 99-Carl Edwards
3. 50-Jon Wood
4. 16-Travis Kvapil
5. 46-Dennis Setzer
6. 75-David Starr
7. 4-Bobby Hamilton
8. 18-Chad Chaffin
9. 29-Terry Cook
10. 88-Matt Crafton

Failed to qualify: none

=== O'Reilly 200 ===
The O'Reilly 200, the 200th race run in the truck series was held June 21 at Memphis Motorsports Park. Jon Wood won the pole.

Top ten results

1. 1-Ted Musgrave
2. 16-Travis Kvapil
3. 46-Dennis Setzer
4. 50-Jon Wood
5. 99-Carl Edwards
6. 2-Jason Leffler
7. 4-Bobby Hamilton
8. 62-Brendan Gaughan
9. 29-Terry Cook
10. 88-Matt Crafton

Failed to qualify: Stan Boyd (#51), Dennis Hannel (#94)

=== GNC 200 ===
The GNC 200 was held June 28 at The Milwaukee Mile. Terry Cook won the pole.

Top ten results

1. 62-Brendan Gaughan
2. 2-Jason Leffler
3. 14-Rick Crawford
4. 1-Ted Musgrave
5. 46-Dennis Setzer
6. 16-Travis Kvapil
7. 29-Terry Cook
8. 75-Hank Parker Jr.
9. 88-Matt Crafton
10. 50-Jon Wood

Failed to qualify: Trevor Boys (#36), Nathal Wulff (#65), Conrad Burr (#87).

- Note: Trevor Boys replaced Michael Dokken in the #66 in the race.

=== O'Reilly Auto Parts 250 ===
The O'Reilly Auto Parts 250 was held July 5 at Kansas Speedway. Chad Chaffin won the pole.

Top ten results

1. 50-Jon Wood
2. 99-Carl Edwards
3. 46-Dennis Setzer
4. 16-Travis Kvapil
5. 59-Robert Pressley
6. 03-Eric Jones
7. 2-Jason Leffler
8. 33-Paul Menard
9. 62-Brendan Gaughan
10. 8-Bill Lester

Failed to qualify: Doug Keller (#27), Aaron Daniel (#11), Wayne Edwards (#25), Bobby Dotter (#07)

• This was Jon Wood's first career Truck Series victory.

=== Built Ford Tough 225 ===
The Built Ford Tough 225 was held July 12 at Kentucky Speedway. Jon Wood won the pole.

Top ten results

1. 99-Carl Edwards
2. 1-Ted Musgrave
3. 46-Dennis Setzer
4. 50-Jon Wood
5. 2-Jason Leffler
6. 16-Travis Kvapil
7. 88-Matt Crafton
8. 59-Robert Pressley
9. 29-Terry Cook
10. 75-Hank Parker Jr.

Failed to qualify: Andy Hillenburg (#10), Blake Mallory (#36)

- This was Carl Edwards' first Truck Series victory, but he suffered a 100-point penalty after the race due to cylinder head infractions.

=== Missouri-Illinois Dealers Ram Tough 200 ===
The Missouri-Illinois Dealers Ram Tough 200 was held July 19 at Gateway International Raceway. Travis Kvapil won the pole.

Top ten results

1. 62-Brendan Gaughan
2. 2-Jason Leffler
3. 16-Travis Kvapil
4. 99-Carl Edwards
5. 14-Rick Crawford
6. 75-David Starr
7. 1-Ted Musgrave
8. 46-Dennis Setzer
9. 29-Terry Cook
10. 88-Matt Crafton

Failed to qualify: none

=== Sears 200 ===
The Sears 200 was held July 26 at Michigan International Speedway. Jason Leffler won the pole.

Top ten results

1. 62-Brendan Gaughan
2. 1-Ted Musgrave
3. 18-Chad Chaffin
4. 2-Jason Leffler
5. 99-Carl Edwards
6. 50-Jon Wood
7. 16-Travis Kvapil
8. 46-Dennis Setzer
9. 29-Terry Cook
10. 4-Bobby Hamilton

Failed to qualify: none

=== Power Stroke Diesel 200 ===
The Power Stroke Diesel 200 was held August 1 at Indianapolis Raceway Park. Terry Cook won the pole.

Top ten results

1. 99-Carl Edwards
2. 16-Travis Kvapil
3. 4-Bobby Hamilton
4. 62-Brendan Gaughan
5. 50-Jon Wood
6. 1-Ted Musgrave
7. 52-Ken Schrader
8. 46-Dennis Setzer
9. 29-Terry Cook
10. 88-Matt Crafton

Failed to qualify: Jason York (#93), Conrad Burr (#87), Casey Kingsland (#66), Jody McCormick (#77), Eric Jones (#03), Jay Sherston (#7), Scott Hall (#79), Doug Mahlik (#09), Ron Polodna (#13), Craig Wood (#11)

=== Federated Auto Parts 200 ===
The Federated Auto Parts 200 was held August 8 at Nashville Superspeedway. Chad Chaffin won the pole.

Top ten results

1. 99-Carl Edwards
2. 1-Ted Musgrave
3. 14-Rick Crawford
4. 75-David Starr
5. 62-Brendan Gaughan
6. 18-Chad Chaffin
7. 50-Jon Wood
8. 46-Dennis Setzer
9. 16-Travis Kvapil
10. 88-Matt Crafton

Failed to qualify: none

=== O'Reilly 200 presented by Valvoline Maxlife ===
The O'Reilly 200 presented by Valvoline Maxlife was held August 20 at Bristol Motor Speedway. Ted Musgrave won the pole.

Top ten results

1. 16-Travis Kvapil
2. 59-Robert Pressley
3. 14-Rick Crawford
4. 62-Brendan Gaughan
5. 46-Dennis Setzer
6. 88-Matt Crafton
7. 18-Chad Chaffin
8. 50-Jon Wood
9. 2-Jason Leffler
10. 6-Kevin Harvick

Failed to qualify: none

=== Virginia Is For Lovers 200 ===
The Virginia Is For Lovers 200 was held September 4 at Richmond International Raceway. Travis Kvapil won the pole.

Top ten results

1. 33-Tony Stewart
2. 59-Robert Pressley
3. 1-Ted Musgrave
4. 50-Jon Wood
5. 46-Dennis Setzer
6. 14-Rick Crawford
7. 62-Brendan Gaughan
8. 4-Bobby Hamilton
9. 16-Travis Kvapil
10. 9-Johnny Sauter

Failed to qualify: Brian Sockwell (#51)

=== New Hampshire 200 ===
The New Hampshire 200 was held September 13 at New Hampshire International Speedway. Jimmy Spencer won the pole.

Top ten results

1. 2-Jimmy Spencer
2. 99-Carl Edwards
3. 4-Bobby Hamilton
4. 46-Dennis Setzer
5. 62-Brendan Gaughan
6. 18-Chad Chaffin
7. 16-Travis Kvapil
8. 75-David Starr
9. 50-Jon Wood
10. 88-Matt Crafton

Failed to qualify: none

- This was Spencer's only Truck Series victory.

=== American Racing Wheels 200 ===
The American Racing Wheels 200 was held September 20 at California Speedway. Brendan Gaughan won the pole.

Top ten results

1. 1-Ted Musgrave
2. 62-Brendan Gaughan
3. 46-Dennis Setzer
4. 14-Rick Crawford
5. 75-David Starr
6. 2-Andy Houston
7. 99-Carl Edwards
8. 16-Travis Kvapil
9. 50-Jon Wood
10. 39-Jason Small

Failed to qualify: Doug Keller (#77), Blake Mallory (#27), Ricky Sanders (#19), Aaron Daniel (#93)

=== Las Vegas 350 ===
The Las Vegas 350 was held September 27 at Las Vegas Motor Speedway. Brendan Gaughan won the pole.

Top ten results

1. 62-Brendan Gaughan
2. 75-David Starr
3. 46-Dennis Setzer
4. 16-Travis Kvapil
5. 11-Jack Sprague
6. 2-Andy Houston
7. 29-Terry Cook
8. 1-Ted Musgrave
9. 88-Matt Crafton
10. 4-Bobby Hamilton

Failed to qualify: J. C. Stout (#91), Jason Small (#39), Trevor Boys (#36), Chris Horn (#58), Kelly Sutton (#02), Conrad Burr (#94), David Gilliland (#09), Rick Bogart (#70), Loni Richardson (#0), Tina Gordon (#31), Jason York (#97), David Stover (#63), Ricky Sanders (#19), Kenny Hendrick (#9), Tim Woods (#54)

=== John Boy & Billy 250 ===
The John Boy & Billy 250 was held October 4 at South Boston Speedway. Brendan Gaughan won the pole.

Top ten results

1. 46-Dennis Setzer
2. 16-Travis Kvapil
3. 1-Ted Musgrave
4. 50-Jon Wood
5. 14-Rick Crawford
6. 2-Andy Houston
7. 99-Carl Edwards
8. 4-Bobby Hamilton
9. 75-David Starr
10. 59-Robert Pressley

Failed to qualify: Randy Briggs (#51)

=== Silverado 350 ===
The Silverado 350 was held October 11 at Texas Motor Speedway. Andy Houston won the pole.

Top ten results

1. 62-Brendan Gaughan
2. 16-Travis Kvapil
3. 1-Ted Musgrave
4. 99-Carl Edwards
5. 2-Andy Houston
6. 50-Jon Wood
7. 29-Terry Cook
8. 46-Dennis Setzer
9. 14-Rick Crawford
10. 4-Bobby Hamilton

Failed to qualify: Shane Wallace (#04), Loni Richardson (#0).

- Note: Shane Wallace replaced Jamie Aube in the #86 in the race.

=== Advance Auto Parts 200 ===
The Advance Auto Parts 200 was held October 18 at Martinsville Speedway. Carl Edwards won the pole.

Top ten results

1. 50-Jon Wood
2. 99-Carl Edwards
3. 46-Dennis Setzer
4. 14-Rick Crawford
5. 4-Bobby Hamilton
6. 2-Jimmy Spencer
7. 17-Darrell Waltrip
8. 52-Ken Schrader
9. 75-David Starr
10. 1-Ted Musgrave

Failed to qualify: Jerry Hill (#51), Ron Polodna (#13), Wayne Edwards (#95), Jeremy Thompson (#92), Craig Wood (#73), Scotty Sands (#47).

- Note: Wayne Edwards replaced Dallas Norman in the #31 in the race.

=== Chevy Silverado 150 ===
The Chevy Silverado 150 was held October 31 at Phoenix International Raceway. Ted Musgrave won the pole.

Top ten results

1. 6-Kevin Harvick
2. 1-Ted Musgrave
3. 46-Dennis Setzer
4. 99-Carl Edwards
5. 4-Bobby Hamilton
6. 75-David Starr
7. 50-Jon Wood
8. 59-Robert Pressley
9. 16-Travis Kvapil
10. 2-Andy Houston

Failed to qualify: Nathan Wulff (#65), Tim Woods (#54), Pete Harding (#36), Tommy Pistone (#28), Stan Boyd (#5), Cory Kruseman (#98)

=== Ford 200 ===
The Ford 200 was held November 14 at Homestead–Miami Speedway. Bobby Hamilton won the pole.

This race saw the possibility of any one of the series' four top drivers in the points standings coming away with the championship. Going into the race Brendan Gaughan, driving the #62 Orleans Casino Dodge Ram for Orleans Racing, was leading the standings. Ted Musgrave, driving the #1 Mopar Dodge Ram for Ultra Motorsports, was sitting second. Third place was Dennis Setzer, in the #46 Acxiom Chevrolet Silverado for Morgan-Dollar Motorsports, and fourth was held by Travis Kvapil, driving the #16 IWX Motor Freight Chevrolet Silverado that Mike Bliss had won the series championship driving one year earlier for Xpress Motorsports.

Controversy was caused, however, by potential roadblocks caused by drivers' teammates. Setzer's team did not enter a second truck in the race. Kvapil's team was fielding the #11 IWX Silverado for Jack Sprague, who had joined the team after being fired by Haas CNC Racing in the Winston Cup Series. Gaughan's team was fielding the #61 Orleans Casino Ram driven by Scott Lynch, the team's developmental driver.

Ultra Motorsports, meanwhile, fielded a total of five trucks, two of which were cobbled together specifically for the event. In addition to Musgrave’s #1 Mopar Ram, Ultra fielded its other full time truck, the #2 Team ASE Ram driven by Andy Houston, and its usual part time #7 Dodge Motorsports Ram that was its driver development truck and was driven in this race by Tyler Walker. These trucks were joined by the #10 Team ASE Ram, which Smith tabbed Houston’s brother Marty to drive, and the #27 Ultra Wheels Ram that would be driven by former IndyCar driver P.J. Jones.

Among the critics of the move was the points leader, who felt that by fielding five trucks that Smith was trying to give Musgrave an unfair advantage; Marty Houston, who had been working on his brother’s pit crew at the time, had not raced in over two years and Jones, who ran primarily as a road course ringer in NASCAR, had not raced in the Truck Series since its inaugural season in 1995. Gaughan's complaints proved to be valid, as with thirty-four laps to go in the race, his day came to an end. The #62 made contact with the #10, who was running a lap down, and in the process Bryan Reffner in the #80 Emerson Electronics Ford F-150 was collected in the wreck. None of the three trucks were able to continue and the accident cost Gaughan his chance at the championship. An angry Gaughan blasted Houston for causing the accident and Smith for his tactics in an interview following the accident.

The next contender to run into trouble was Musgrave. With two laps to go in the race, the race restarted and Musgrave attempted to make a pass on Kvapil's inside before the cars reached the start/finish line. Musgrave completed the pass and then passed Setzer, but NASCAR threw the black flag as Musgrave was judged to have been in violation of race rules. Musgrave never answered the black flag, and when the checkered flag fell on the next lap he crossed it in sixth place behind Sprague and in front of Kvapil, who passed Setzer for seventh. With the penalty, however, Musgrave was listed as the last car on the lead lap in thirteenth place.

For several minutes, NASCAR held off on making the results official as they reviewed Musgrave's penalty. After a 23-minute delay, the black flag was upheld, and Kvapil was declared the series champion. The final margin was nine points, while Musgrave finished eighteen points behind and Gaughan forty (without the black flag, Musgrave would have been the champion over Kvapil by 12 points, with Setzer 21 behind, and Gaughan 52 back).

In a post-race interview, an obviously angry Musgrave, while acknowledging his infraction, blamed it on Kvapil putting the brakes on him and responded with, "That figures. Screw them. All I can say is that next year, you're going to see a whole new Ted Musgrave. He's going to be the dirtiest son of a gun going out there on the racetrack and you might as well throw that rulebook away. I ain't going by it no more."

Xpress Motorsports won its second consecutive Truck Series Championship as a team, as Mike Bliss had won the 2002 series championship driving the same truck Kvapil took to the championship.

Polesitter Bobby Hamilton won the race. Of the additional drivers that the Xpress, Ultra, and Orleans teams entered, Jack Sprague and P. J. Jones finished in the top ten, with Sprague fifth and Jones ninth. Scott Lynch finished twelfth, Tyler Walker twenty-third, and Marty Houston thirtieth. Gaughan finished the race in twenty-ninth.

IndyCar Series driver and future Indianapolis 500 winner Buddy Rice made his NASCAR debut in this race driving SealMaster Racing's #88 Chevrolet Silverado normally driven by Matt Crafton. Crafton drove the team's #98 entry for this race. Rice would finish 20th.

Top ten results (on the track)

1. 4-Bobby Hamilton
2. 14-Rick Crawford
3. 75-David Starr
4. 2-Andy Houston
5. 11-Jack Sprague
6. 1-Ted Musgrave
7. 16-Travis Kvapil
8. 46-Dennis Setzer
9. 50-Jon Wood
10. 27-P. J. Jones

Top ten results (official result)

1. 4-Bobby Hamilton
2. 14-Rick Crawford
3. 75-David Starr
4. 2-Andy Houston
5. 11-Jack Sprague
6. 16-Travis Kvapil
7. 46-Dennis Setzer
8. 50-Jon Wood
9. 27-P. J. Jones
10. 18-Chad Chaffin

Failed to qualify: Derrike Cope (#93), Jason Hedlesky (#51), Wayne Edwards (#95), Lance Hooper (#01), Dana White (#25), Jamie Aube (#23), Carl Long (#5), Danny Bagwell (#81)

== Full Drivers' Championship ==
(key) Bold – Pole position awarded by time. Italics – Pole position set by owner's points. * – Most laps led.

Pos	Driver	DAY	DAR	MMR	MAR	CLT	DOV	TEX	MEM	MIL	KAN	KEN	GTW	MCH	IRP	NSH	BRI	RCH	NHA	CAL	LVS	SBO	TEX	MAR	PHO	HOM	Points
1	Travis Kvapil	2	4	16	18	4	5	4	2	6	4	6	3	7	2	9	1	9	7	8	4	2	2	16	9	6	3837
2	Dennis Setzer	7	28	1*	1	23	9	5	3	5	3	3	8	8	8	8	5	5	4	3	3	1*	8	3*	3	7	3828
3	Ted Musgrave	29	2*	**5**	**2**	1	21	13	1*	4	15	2	7	2	6	2	**15**	3*	12*	1	8	3	3	10	**2**	13	3819
4	Brendan Gaughan	10	3	3	16	2	18	1	8	1*	9	22*	1*	1*	4	5	4	7	5	**2***	**1***	**15**	1*	11	12	29	3797
5	Jon Wood	8	19	2	22	22	4	3	**4**	10	1*	**4**	11	6	5	7	8	4	9	9	19	4	6	1*	7	8	3659
6	Bobby Hamilton	4	1	4	5*	7	**2**	**7***	7	29	16	18	14	10	3	11	12	8	3	16	10	8	10	5	5	**1***	3627
7	Rick Crawford	1*	7	6	6	3	8*	14	11	3	23	11	5	12	14	3	3	6	18	4	36	5	9	4	11	2	3578
8	Carl Edwards **(R)**	24	23	15	4	12	33	2	5	15	2	1	4	5	1*	1*	11	25	2	7	29	7	4	**2**	4	27	3416
9	Terry Cook	9	8	10	9	14	20	9	9	**7**	12	9	9	9	**9**	14	27	16	15	12	7	18	7	19	16	11	3212
10	Chad Chaffin	17	5	20	26*	8	7	8	28	13	**14**	26	13	3	12	**6**	7	11	6	17	18	13	15	14	18	10	3143
11	Matt Crafton	12	11	29	13	9	22	10	10	9	19	7	10	25	10	10	6	14	10	14	9	16	12	28	14	15	3074
12	Robert Pressley	3	10	11	17	31	10	26			5	8		14	18	15	2	2	14	11	11	10	13	27	8	26	2773
13	David Starr	36	9	9	12	17	3	6					6	13	11	4	18	32	8	5	2	9	31	9	6	3	2768
14	Bill Lester	18	12	13	19	**15**	11	12	26	12	10	12	22	11	28	16	19	30	13	28	20	23	28	22	20	18	2712
15	Randy MacDonald	32	22	23	20	19	14	16	36	14	17	16	17	28	13	21	20	18	28	21	24	25	23	23	25	24	2458
16	Jason Leffler	**30**	6	7	11	21	1	27	6	2	7	5	2	**4**	15	24	9										2209
17	Jody Lavender **(R)**		25	27	23	18	13	15	13	24	20	24	16	23	21	18	22	19				19	16	23	22	16	2168
18	Jerry Hill	35	20	24	32	28	31	21	20	23	18	33	29	20	27	29	34	23	21	27	25	28	20	DNQ			1882
19	Randy Briggs **(R)**	14	13	34	DNQ	34	16	20	17	20	21	17	25	16	17	19	24			23		DNQ	17				1618
20	Phil Bonifield	34	29			DNQ	29	28	23	32	28	25	30	32		28	35	35	32	31	31	30	32	35	29	25	1524
21	Andy Houston	5	21	12	15	30														6	6	6	**5**		10	4	1487
22	Rich Bickle	19			8	10	32	24	12	27	13											12		12	33	22	1288
23	Ken Schrader				14	11	6			21					7		13	33	11					8	17	32	1286
24	Lance Hooper	20				27		35	32		32	31	33	27			26	31	30	32	33	31	33	32	24	DNQ	1191
25	Tina Gordon **(R)**	22	18	17	DNQ	13	19	22		25	31	21				13		26			DNQ						1112
26	T. J. Bell **(R)**			18	28		12			28	25	29	28		25	26				30	23		27				1059
27	Eric Jones	DNQ				16		11		17	6			18	DNQ				26		16		14			14	1058
28	Morgan Shepherd	26	24		35	29	26		33	33	34	28			34	25	29		33					29	36	36	991
29	Bobby Dotter	11	32	25	34					30	DNQ								29	22	17	11			21		939
30	Kevin Harvick		26		3	5*				35							10*								1*		807
31	Jamie Aube					36		33	34					24			32	36	17		35	34	QL	24	26	DNQ	800
32	Stan Boyd	16	15				28	29	DNQ	36	33	34	36	29	30					20			21		DNQ		799
33	Shane Wallace								29	16			15		16					18			26		32		685
34	Doug Keller **(R)**	25	17	28	DNQ						DNQ		27	19		31	33			DNQ	30						674
35	Kenny Hendrick								35		36	36	35	34	31	32			33	35	DNQ		35	36	34		656
36	Chris Horn					33		30			22	14	31	17							DNQ		25				625
37	David Stover								25	18	27		26		35		17				DNQ		30				607
38	Roland Isaacs				QL				30	31						30	31	34	34			35		34	30		600
39	Wayne Edwards							36			DNQ						23	24		24	28		22	33	28	DNQ	595
40	Brandon Whitt			19							26	30								13	26		34			35	592
41	Ricky Sanders	DNQ						17			30	19	20	22		27				DNQ	DNQ						573
42	Paul Menard									11	8		21				21					21					572
43	L. W. Miller	21	16		27	20	24	32																			558
44	Hank Parker Jr.								15	8	11	10															524
45	Johnny Chapman											27		26	36	17	30			19							513
46	Mike Wallace	6														12									15	21	500
47	Ken Weaver			26			17			34			19							15							482
48	Mike Skinner											13	12	15	22												471
49	Trevor Boys			36					22	26	24	32								29	DNQ						471
50	Andy Petree			14	10										20									18			467
51	Brandon Miller			8																		26	14		19		454
52	Shane Sieg																		16		15		19			17	451
53	Charlie Bradberry				30				16						33			20				24					446
54	Tracy Hines														32								11	13	13		445
55	Jimmy Spencer																	29	**1***					6			416
56	Michael Dokken	31				DNQ	27	34	14	QL	29		34														410
57	Aaron Daniel							19			DNQ	15	18	35						DNQ							391
58	Conrad Burr				DNQ	26	15		18	DNQ					DNQ			28			DNQ						391
59	Darrell Waltrip				7										29									7			368
60	Ryan McGlynn				29							35		31					22			33					365
61	Brian Sockwell	28				24									19			DNQ						31			346
62	Blake Mallory								31			DNQ	24			23				DNQ			24				346
63	Kelly Sutton								27										23		DNQ				35	19	340
64	Jason Small			21																10	DNQ				23		328
65	Dana White		34	33	36	35														33	32					DNQ	314
66	Jack Sprague																				5					5	310
67	Mark McFarland																	12						15		34	306
68	Ryan Hemphill															20	28	15									300
69	Johnny Sauter																25	10								33	286
70	Johnathon Price											23		30									36				280
71	Tyler Walker																	27			21					23	276
72	Shawna Robinson							18													29		29				261
73	Loni Richardson											20		21						36	DNQ		DNQ				258
74	Scott Lynch																				12					12	254
75	J. C. Stout				31					19									31		DNQ						246
76	Randy Renfrow	33	31				25																				222
77	Tim Sauter														23		14	21									221
78	Brian Rose	DNQ	14		24																						212
79	Nathan Wulff			22					19	DNQ															DNQ		203
80	Jay Godley																					22		20			200
81	Bryan Reffner																	13								31	194
82	Stuart Kirby																		24			20					194
83	Andy Ponstein														24			22									188
84	Robby Benton																		25	25	22						185
85	Tony Stewart																	1									180
86	Donnie Neuenberger					25		25																			176
87	Stephen Rhodes			30	21																						173
88	Alex Müller														26									25			173
89	G. J. Mennen Jr.	23												33													158
90	Jeremy Mayfield					6																					155
91	Ronnie Hornaday	27				32																					149
92	P. J. Jones																									9	138
93	Rick Bogart																			34	DNQ				31		131
94	Ed Berrier	13																									124
95	Randy LaJoie																				13						124
96	Nick Woodward																					14					121
97	Andy Hillenburg	15										DNQ															118
98	Brad Teague																16										115
99	Clay Brown																					17					112
100	Matt Carter																							17			112
101	Patrick Lawler							31															18				109
102	Doug Mahlik														DNQ				18								103
103	Buddy Rice																									20	103
104	Jeremy Thompson								21															DNQ			100
105	Matt McCall																							21			100
106	Chase Montgomery															22											97
107	Jerry Miller						23																				94
108	Johnny Borneman III							23																			94
109	Ryan Hanson												23														94
110	Jay Sherston								24						DNQ												91
111	Tim Woods			31	25																DNQ				DNQ		88
112	Tommy Pistone																					26			DNQ		85
113	Geoff Bodine	DNQ	27																								82
114	Jarod Robie																		27								82
115	Ron Polodna				DNQ										DNQ							27		DNQ			82
116	A. J. Fike																								27		82
117	Frank Kimmel																									28	79
118	Gilbert King																					29					76
119	Teri MacDonald **(R)**		30																								73
120	Elliott Sadler																							30			73
121	Marty Houston																									30	73
122	Gary Higgs			32																							67
123	Jon Lemke												32														67
124	Craig Wood				DNQ										DNQ							32	DNQ				67
125	Rusty Alton				33																						64
126	Willie Green															33											64
127	Jerry Allec Jr.																				34						61
128	Dennis Hannel			35					DNQ																		58
129	Rick Ware													36													55
130	Carl Long																		36							DNQ	55
131	Scotty Sands																					36		DNQ			55
132	Jason York														DNQ			17	19		DNQ						
133	Steadman Marlin									22																	
134	Jason White						30				35																
135	Joe Varde		33																								
136	James Stephenson				DNQ																						
137	Jody McCormick				DNQ										DNQ												
138	Casey Kingsland														DNQ												
139	Scott Hall														DNQ												
140	David Gilliland																				DNQ						
141	Pete Harding																							DNQ			
142	Cory Kruseman																							DNQ			
143	Derrike Cope																									DNQ	
144	Jason Hedlesky																									DNQ	
145	Danny Bagwell																									DNQ	
146	Dallas Norman																							QL			
Pos	Driver	DAY	DAR	MMR	MAR	CLT	DOV	TEX	MEM	MIL	KAN	KEN	GTW	MCH	IRP	NSH	BRI	RCH	NHA	CAL	LVS	SBO	TEX	MAR	PHO	HOM	Points

== Rookie of the Year ==
Gong Show winner Carl Edwards was named Rookie of the Year, winning three races and finishing eighth in points for Roush Racing. The first runner-up was Jody Lavender, who competed in 21 of 25 races for Green Light Racing. Tina Gordon, T. J. Bell and Doug Keller made limited attempts at the award, while Teri MacDonald drove part-time for her brother Randy MacDonald in the Truck Series.

== See also ==
- 2003 NASCAR Winston Cup Series
- 2003 NASCAR Busch Series
- 2003 ARCA Re/Max Series
- 2003 NASCAR Goody's Dash Series
