= David Stover (racing driver) =

American racing driver (born 1979)

- Born: December 13, 1979 (age 46); Independence, Missouri, U.S.

NASCAR FedEx Freight Truck Series career
- 7 races run over 1 year
- 2003 position: 37th
- Best finish: 37th (2003)
- First race: 2003 O'Reilly 200 (Memphis)
- Last race: 2003 Silverado 350K (Texas)
Wins	Top tens	Poles
0	0	0
- Statistics up to date as of October 6, 2017.

David Stover (born December 13, 1979) is a former NASCAR driver.

Stover did a part-time schedule for MB Motorsports in 2003. He made his debut at the Memphis, starting 23rd and finishing 25th. He would earn his first career top-20 finish the next race at Milwaukee, finishing 18th. Stover's best run would come at Bristol, where he finished 15th. His best career start would come with a pair of 23rds. Four DNFs in the last five races, however, hindered his progress, and Chris Wimmer replaced him in 2004, and Stover has not raced since.

== Motorsports career results ==
=== NASCAR ===
(key) (Bold - Pole position awarded by qualifying time. Italics - Pole position earned by points standings or practice time. * – Most laps led.)

==== Camping World Truck Series ====
NASCAR Camping World Truck Series results
Year	Team	No.	Make	1	2	3	4	5	6	7	8	9	10	11	12	13	14	15	16	17	18	19	20	21	22	23	24	25	NCWTC	Pts	Ref
2003	MB Motorsports	63	Ford	DAY	DAR	MMR	MAR	CLT	DOV	TEX	MEM; 25	MLW; 18	KAN; 27	KEN	GTW; 26	MCH	IRP; 35	NSH	BRI; 17	RCH	NHA	CAL	LVS; DNQ	SBO	TEX; 30	MAR	PHO	HOM	37th	607	
