= John Boy & Billy 250 =

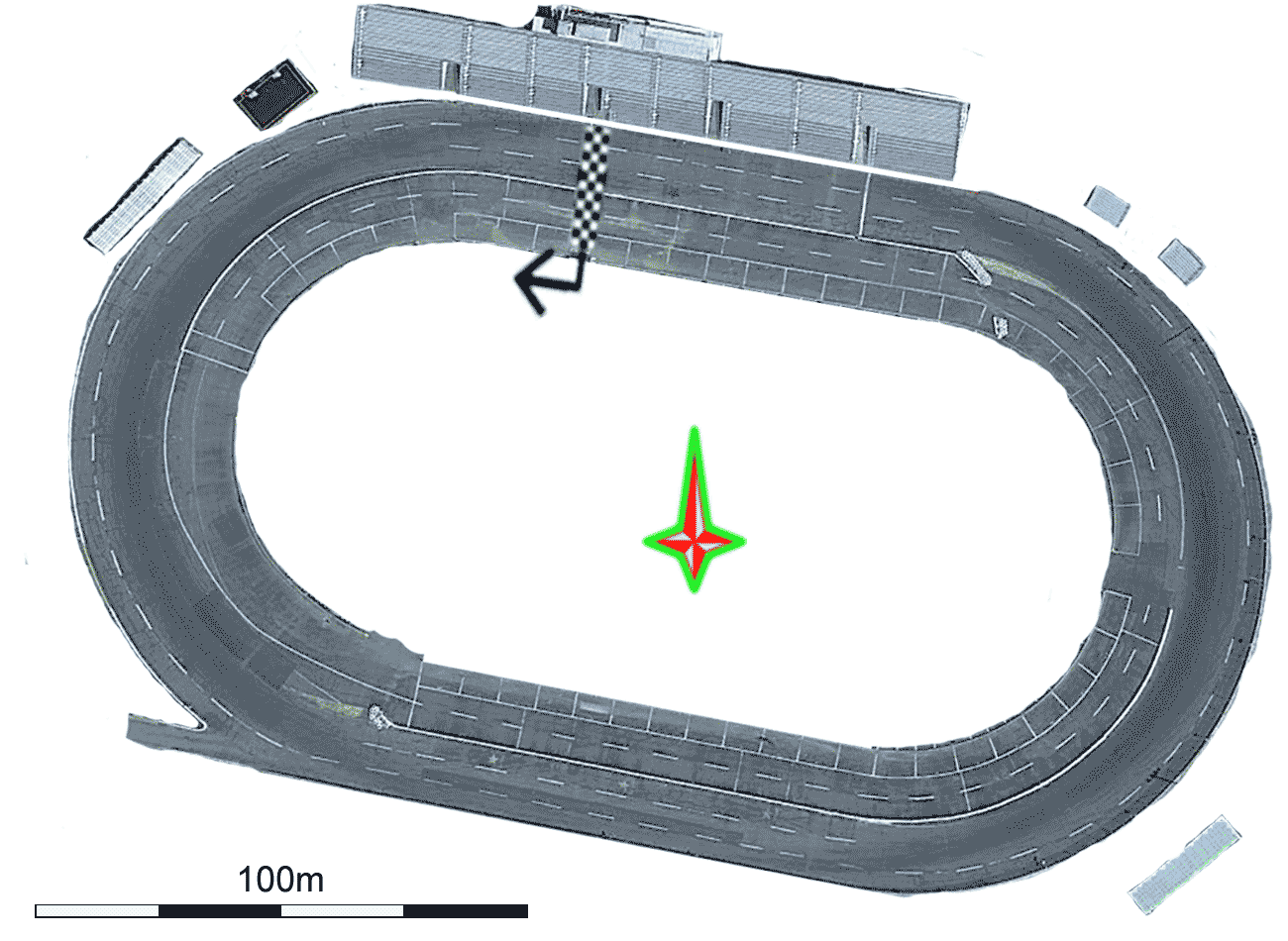

NASCAR Craftsman Truck Series
- Venue: South Boston Speedway
- First race: 2001
- Last race: 2003
- Distance: 100 miles (160.9 km)
- Laps: 250
- Previous names: John Boy & Billy 250 (2003); John Boy & Billy's Hardee's 250 Presented by TextiLease (2002); NetZero 250 Presented by John Boy & Billy (2001)

The John Boy & Billy 250 was a NASCAR Craftsman Truck Series stock car race held at South Boston Speedway, in South Boston, Virginia. First held in 2001, the series ran once a year at the track through 2003, after which South Boston Speedway departed the series schedule. The scheduled race distance was 250 laps (100 miles (160.9 km)) each year the race was held; no driver won the race more than once.

== Past winners ==
Year	Date	No.	Driver	Team	Manufacturer	Race Distance		Race Time	Average Speed (mph)	Report	Ref
Year	Date	No.	Driver	Team	Manufacturer	Laps	Miles (km)	Race Time	Average Speed (mph)	Report	Ref
2001	September 28	1	Ted Musgrave	Ultra Motorsports	Dodge	250	100 (160.93)	1:51:32	53.796	Report	
2002	September 21	16	Mike Bliss	Xpress Motorsports	Chevrolet	257*	102.8 (165.44)	1:43:50	59.403	Report	
2003	October 4	46	Dennis Setzer	Morgan-Dollar Motorsports	Chevrolet	253*	101.2 (162.87)	1:22:08	73.929	Report	

- 2002 and 2003: Race extended due to a green–white–checker finish.

=== Manufacturer wins ===
# Wins	Make	Years won
2	(United States) Chevrolet	2002, 2003
1	(United States) Dodge	2001
