= 2003 Sharpie 500 =

24th race of the 2003 NASCAR Winston Cup Series

Race details
- Race 24 of 36 in the 2003 NASCAR Winston Cup Series
- The 2003 Sharpie 500 program cover, celebrating the newly built Dale Earnhardt Terrance built at the track. Artwork by Sam Bass. The painting is called "Terrence Dedication".
- Date: August 23, 2003
- Official name: 43rd Annual Sharpie 500
- Location: Bristol, Tennessee, Bristol Motor Speedway
- Course: Permanent racing facility
- Course length: 0.533 miles (0.858 km)
- Distance: 500 laps, 266.5 mi (428.89 km)
- Scheduled distance: 500 laps, 266.5 mi (428.89 km)
- Average speed: 77.421 miles per hour (124.597 km/h)
- Attendance: 160,000

Pole position
| Driver | Jeff Gordon | Hendrick Motorsports |
- Time: 15.038

Most laps led
| Driver | Jeff Gordon | Hendrick Motorsports |
- Laps: 179

Winner
| No. 97 | Kurt Busch | Roush Racing |

Television in the United States
- Network: TNT
- Announcers: Allen Bestwick, Benny Parsons, Wally Dallenbach Jr.

Radio in the United States
- Radio: Performance Racing Network

The 2003 Sharpie 500 was the 24th stock car race of the 2003 NASCAR Winston Cup Series season and the 43rd iteration of the event. The race was held on Saturday, August 23, 2003, before a crowd of 160,000 in Bristol, Tennessee at Bristol Motor Speedway, a 0.533 miles (0.858 km) permanent oval-shaped racetrack. The race took the scheduled 500 laps to complete. At race's end, Kurt Busch of Roush Racing would win a caution-filled event, with 20 cautions that matched the track record to win his eighth career NASCAR Winston Cup Series win and his fourth and final win of the season. To fill out the podium, Kevin Harvick of Richard Childress Racing and Jamie McMurray of Chip Ganassi Racing would finish second and third, respectively.

== Background ==
The layout of Bristol Motor Speedway, the venue where the race was held.

The Bristol Motor Speedway, formerly known as Bristol International Raceway and Bristol Raceway, is a NASCAR short track venue located in Bristol, Tennessee. Constructed in 1960, it held its first NASCAR race on July 30, 1961. Despite its short length, Bristol is among the most popular tracks on the NASCAR schedule because of its distinct features, which include extraordinarily steep banking, an all concrete surface, two pit roads, and stadium-like seating. It has also been named one of the loudest NASCAR tracks.

=== Entry list ===
| # | Driver | Team | Make | Sponsor |
|---|---|---|---|---|
| 0 | Jason Leffler | Haas CNC Racing | Pontiac | NetZero HiSpeed |
| 1 | Jeff Green | Dale Earnhardt, Inc. | Chevrolet | Pennzoil Synthetic |
| 01 | Mike Skinner | MB2 Motorsports | Pontiac | U.S. Army |
| 2 | Rusty Wallace | Penske Racing South | Dodge | Miller Lite, Winston Victory Lap |
| 02 | Hermie Sadler | SCORE Motorsports | Pontiac | Virginia Cavaliers |
| 4 | Johnny Sauter | Morgan–McClure Motorsports | Pontiac | Kodak Perfect Touch |
| 5 | Terry Labonte | Hendrick Motorsports | Chevrolet | Kellogg's, Got Milk? |
| 6 | Mark Martin | Roush Racing | Ford | Viagra |
| 7 | Ted Musgrave | Ultra Motorsports | Dodge | Sirius Satellite Radio |
| 8 | Dale Earnhardt Jr. | Dale Earnhardt, Inc. | Chevrolet | Budweiser |
| 9 | Bill Elliott | Evernham Motorsports | Dodge | Dodge Summer Sales Deal |
| 10 | Johnny Benson Jr. | MB2 Motorsports | Pontiac | Valvoline |
| 12 | Ryan Newman | Penske Racing South | Dodge | Alltel |
| 15 | Michael Waltrip | Dale Earnhardt, Inc. | Chevrolet | NAPA Auto Parts |
| 16 | Greg Biffle | Roush Racing | Ford | Grainger |
| 17 | Matt Kenseth | Roush Racing | Ford | DeWalt |
| 18 | Bobby Labonte | Joe Gibbs Racing | Chevrolet | Interstate Batteries |
| 19 | Jeremy Mayfield | Evernham Motorsports | Dodge | Dodge Summer Sales Deal |
| 20 | Tony Stewart | Joe Gibbs Racing | Chevrolet | The Home Depot |
| 21 | Ricky Rudd | Wood Brothers Racing | Ford | Motorcraft |
| 22 | Ward Burton | Bill Davis Racing | Dodge | Caterpillar |
| 23 | Kenny Wallace | Bill Davis Racing | Dodge | Stacker 2 |
| 24 | Jeff Gordon | Hendrick Motorsports | Chevrolet | DuPont |
| 25 | Joe Nemechek | Hendrick Motorsports | Chevrolet | UAW, Delphi |
| 27 | Scott Wimmer | Bill Davis Racing | Chevrolet | YJ Stinger |
| 29 | Kevin Harvick | Richard Childress Racing | Chevrolet | GM Goodwrench |
| 30 | Steve Park | Richard Childress Racing | Chevrolet | America Online |
| 31 | Robby Gordon | Richard Childress Racing | Chevrolet | Cingular Wireless |
| 32 | Ricky Craven | PPI Motorsports | Pontiac | Tide |
| 37 | Derrike Cope | Quest Motor Racing | Chevrolet | Friendly's |
| 38 | Elliott Sadler | Robert Yates Racing | Ford | Combos |
| 40 | Sterling Marlin | Chip Ganassi Racing | Dodge | Coors Light |
| 41 | Casey Mears | Chip Ganassi Racing | Dodge | Target |
| 42 | Jamie McMurray | Chip Ganassi Racing | Dodge | Texaco, Havoline |
| 43 | Christian Fittipaldi | Petty Enterprises | Dodge | Cheerios Heart Health |
| 45 | Kyle Petty | Petty Enterprises | Dodge | Georgia-Pacific Brawny |
| 48 | Jimmie Johnson | Hendrick Motorsports | Chevrolet | Lowe's |
| 49 | Ken Schrader | BAM Racing | Dodge | SEM |
| 50 | Larry Foyt | A. J. Foyt Enterprises | Dodge | Harrah's "Oh Yeah!" |
| 54 | Todd Bodine | BelCar Motorsports | Ford | National Guard |
| 74 | Tony Raines | BACE Motorsports | Chevrolet | BACE Motorsports |
| 77 | Dave Blaney | Jasper Motorsports | Ford | First Tennessee Bank |
| 79 | Billy Bigley | Arnold Motorsports | Dodge | Arnold Development Companies |
| 88 | Dale Jarrett | Robert Yates Racing | Ford | UPS |
| 89 | Morgan Shepherd | Shepherd Racing Ventures | Ford | Racing with Jesus |
| 97 | Kurt Busch | Roush Racing | Ford | Sharpie Metallic Silver |
| 99 | Jeff Burton | Roush Racing | Ford | Citgo |
Official entry list

== Practice ==
Originally, three practice sessions were going to be held, with all three being held on Friday, August 22. However, due to a long rain delay during qualifying, the second practice session was canceled.

=== First practice ===
The first practice session was held on Friday, August 22, at 11:20 AM EST, and would last for two hours. Jeff Gordon of Hendrick Motorsports would set the fastest time in the session, with a lap of 15.095 and an average speed of 127.115 miles per hour (204.572 km/h).

| Pos. | # | Driver | Team | Make | Time | Speed |
|---|---|---|---|---|---|---|
| 1 | 24 | Jeff Gordon | Hendrick Motorsports | Chevrolet | 15.095 | 127.115 |
| 2 | 17 | Matt Kenseth | Roush Racing | Ford | 15.165 | 126.528 |
| 3 | 8 | Dale Earnhardt Jr. | Dale Earnhardt, Inc. | Chevrolet | 15.173 | 126.462 |
Full first practice results

=== Second and final practice ===
The second and final practice session, sometimes referred to as Happy Hour, was held on Friday, August 22, at 6:15 PM EST, and would last for 45 minutes. Kevin Harvick of Richard Childress Racing would set the fastest time in the session, with a lap of 15.598 and an average speed of 123.016 miles per hour (197.975 km/h).

| Pos. | # | Driver | Team | Make | Time | Speed |
|---|---|---|---|---|---|---|
| 1 | 29 | Kevin Harvick | Richard Childress Racing | Chevrolet | 15.598 | 123.016 |
| 2 | 24 | Jeff Gordon | Hendrick Motorsports | Chevrolet | 15.639 | 122.693 |
| 3 | 8 | Dale Earnhardt Jr. | Dale Earnhardt, Inc. | Chevrolet | 15.655 | 122.568 |
Full Happy Hour practice results

== Qualifying ==
Qualifying was held on Friday, August 22, at 3:05 PM EST. Each driver would have two laps to set a fastest time; the fastest of the two would count as their official qualifying lap. Positions 1-36 would be decided on time, while positions 37-43 would be based on provisionals. Six spots are awarded by the use of provisionals based on owner's points. The seventh is awarded to a past champion who has not otherwise qualified for the race. If no past champ needs the provisional, the next team in the owner points will be awarded a provisional.

Jeff Gordon of Hendrick Motorsports would win the pole, setting a time of 15.038 and an average speed of 127.597 miles per hour (205.347 km/h).

Hermie Sadler, Billy Bigley, Derrike Cope, and Morgan Shepherd would fail to qualify.

=== Full qualifying results ===
| Pos. | # | Driver | Team | Make | Time | Speed |
|---|---|---|---|---|---|---|
| 1 | 24 | Jeff Gordon | Hendrick Motorsports | Chevrolet | 15.038 | 127.597 |
| 2 | 6 | Mark Martin | Roush Racing | Ford | 15.039 | 127.588 |
| 3 | 15 | Michael Waltrip | Dale Earnhardt, Inc. | Chevrolet | 15.069 | 127.334 |
| 4 | 01 | Mike Skinner | MB2 Motorsports | Pontiac | 15.089 | 127.165 |
| 5 | 97 | Kurt Busch | Roush Racing | Ford | 15.096 | 127.106 |
| 6 | 12 | Ryan Newman | Penske Racing South | Dodge | 15.100 | 127.073 |
| 7 | 7 | Ted Musgrave | Ultra Motorsports | Dodge | 15.101 | 127.064 |
| 8 | 21 | Ricky Rudd | Wood Brothers Racing | Ford | 15.105 | 127.031 |
| 9 | 8 | Dale Earnhardt Jr. | Dale Earnhardt, Inc. | Chevrolet | 15.109 | 126.997 |
| 10 | 17 | Matt Kenseth | Roush Racing | Ford | 15.128 | 126.838 |
| 11 | 23 | Kenny Wallace | Bill Davis Racing | Dodge | 15.145 | 126.695 |
| 12 | 74 | Tony Raines | BACE Motorsports | Chevrolet | 15.161 | 126.562 |
| 13 | 5 | Terry Labonte | Hendrick Motorsports | Chevrolet | 15.164 | 126.536 |
| 14 | 32 | Ricky Craven | PPI Motorsports | Pontiac | 15.168 | 126.503 |
| 15 | 77 | Dave Blaney | Jasper Motorsports | Ford | 15.175 | 126.445 |
| 16 | 48 | Jimmie Johnson | Hendrick Motorsports | Chevrolet | 15.180 | 126.403 |
| 17 | 38 | Elliott Sadler | Robert Yates Racing | Ford | 15.181 | 126.395 |
| 18 | 20 | Tony Stewart | Joe Gibbs Racing | Chevrolet | 15.198 | 126.254 |
| 19 | 18 | Bobby Labonte | Joe Gibbs Racing | Chevrolet | 15.201 | 126.229 |
| 20 | 2 | Rusty Wallace | Penske Racing South | Dodge | 15.204 | 126.204 |
| 21 | 4 | Johnny Sauter | Morgan–McClure Motorsports | Pontiac | 15.207 | 126.179 |
| 22 | 31 | Robby Gordon | Richard Childress Racing | Chevrolet | 15.217 | 126.096 |
| 23 | 29 | Kevin Harvick | Richard Childress Racing | Chevrolet | 15.218 | 126.088 |
| 24 | 22 | Ward Burton | Bill Davis Racing | Dodge | 15.226 | 126.021 |
| 25 | 9 | Bill Elliott | Evernham Motorsports | Dodge | 15.232 | 125.972 |
| 26 | 49 | Ken Schrader | BAM Racing | Dodge | 15.235 | 125.947 |
| 27 | 88 | Dale Jarrett | Robert Yates Racing | Ford | 15.249 | 125.831 |
| 28 | 27 | Scott Wimmer | Bill Davis Racing | Chevrolet | 15.252 | 125.807 |
| 29 | 19 | Jeremy Mayfield | Evernham Motorsports | Dodge | 15.262 | 125.724 |
| 30 | 0 | Jason Leffler | Haas CNC Racing | Pontiac | 15.265 | 125.699 |
| 31 | 42 | Jamie McMurray | Chip Ganassi Racing | Dodge | 15.268 | 125.675 |
| 32 | 10 | Johnny Benson Jr. | MB2 Motorsports | Pontiac | 15.269 | 125.666 |
| 33 | 50 | Larry Foyt | A. J. Foyt Enterprises | Dodge | 15.276 | 125.609 |
| 34 | 16 | Greg Biffle | Roush Racing | Ford | 15.279 | 125.584 |
| 35 | 30 | Steve Park | Richard Childress Racing | Chevrolet | 15.302 | 125.395 |
| 36 | 40 | Sterling Marlin | Chip Ganassi Racing | Dodge | 15.317 | 125.273 |
Provisionals
| 37 | 99 | Jeff Burton | Roush Racing | Ford | 15.334 | 125.134 |
| 38 | 25 | Joe Nemechek | Hendrick Motorsports | Chevrolet | 15.352 | 124.987 |
| 39 | 1 | Jeff Green | Dale Earnhardt, Inc. | Chevrolet | 15.339 | 125.093 |
| 40 | 54 | Todd Bodine | BelCar Racing | Ford | 15.463 | 124.090 |
| 41 | 41 | Casey Mears | Chip Ganassi Racing | Dodge | 15.322 | 125.232 |
| 42 | 45 | Kyle Petty | Petty Enterprises | Dodge | 15.410 | 124.517 |
| 43 | 43 | Christian Fittipaldi | Petty Enterprises | Dodge | 15.388 | 124.695 |
Failed to qualify
| 44 | 02 | Hermie Sadler | SCORE Motorsports | Pontiac | 15.373 | 124.816 |
| 45 | 79 | Billy Bigley | Arnold Motorsports | Dodge | 15.397 | 124.622 |
| 46 | 37 | Derrike Cope | Quest Motor Racing | Chevrolet | 15.667 | 122.474 |
| 47 | 89 | Morgan Shepherd | Shepherd Racing Ventures | Ford | — | — |
Official qualifying results

== Race results ==
| Fin | St | # | Driver | Team | Make | Laps | Led | Status | Pts | Winnings |
|---|---|---|---|---|---|---|---|---|---|---|
| 1 | 5 | 97 | Kurt Busch | Roush Racing | Ford | 500 | 121 | running | 180 | $237,565 |
| 2 | 23 | 29 | Kevin Harvick | Richard Childress Racing | Chevrolet | 500 | 39 | running | 175 | $174,223 |
| 3 | 31 | 42 | Jamie McMurray | Chip Ganassi Racing | Dodge | 500 | 0 | running | 165 | $127,390 |
| 4 | 10 | 17 | Matt Kenseth | Roush Racing | Ford | 500 | 0 | running | 160 | $122,905 |
| 5 | 16 | 48 | Jimmie Johnson | Hendrick Motorsports | Chevrolet | 500 | 0 | running | 155 | $100,775 |
| 6 | 6 | 12 | Ryan Newman | Penske Racing South | Dodge | 500 | 30 | running | 155 | $111,940 |
| 7 | 27 | 88 | Dale Jarrett | Robert Yates Racing | Ford | 500 | 0 | running | 146 | $122,418 |
| 8 | 14 | 32 | Ricky Craven | PPI Motorsports | Pontiac | 500 | 0 | running | 142 | $102,740 |
| 9 | 9 | 8 | Dale Earnhardt Jr. | Dale Earnhardt, Inc. | Chevrolet | 500 | 0 | running | 138 | $116,107 |
| 10 | 29 | 19 | Jeremy Mayfield | Evernham Motorsports | Dodge | 500 | 0 | running | 134 | $88,740 |
| 11 | 13 | 5 | Terry Labonte | Hendrick Motorsports | Chevrolet | 500 | 0 | running | 130 | $102,346 |
| 12 | 26 | 49 | Ken Schrader | BAM Racing | Dodge | 500 | 0 | running | 127 | $74,090 |
| 13 | 24 | 22 | Ward Burton | Bill Davis Racing | Dodge | 500 | 0 | running | 124 | $105,996 |
| 14 | 32 | 10 | Johnny Benson Jr. | MB2 Motorsports | Pontiac | 500 | 0 | running | 121 | $98,415 |
| 15 | 11 | 23 | Kenny Wallace | Bill Davis Racing | Dodge | 500 | 0 | running | 118 | $85,735 |
| 16 | 25 | 9 | Bill Elliott | Evernham Motorsports | Dodge | 500 | 0 | running | 115 | $106,018 |
| 17 | 36 | 40 | Sterling Marlin | Chip Ganassi Racing | Dodge | 500 | 61 | running | 117 | $121,035 |
| 18 | 4 | 01 | Mike Skinner | MB2 Motorsports | Pontiac | 500 | 5 | running | 114 | $81,175 |
| 19 | 38 | 25 | Joe Nemechek | Hendrick Motorsports | Chevrolet | 500 | 0 | running | 106 | $70,325 |
| 20 | 12 | 74 | Tony Raines | BACE Motorsports | Chevrolet | 500 | 0 | running | 103 | $68,885 |
| 21 | 41 | 41 | Casey Mears | Chip Ganassi Racing | Dodge | 500 | 0 | running | 100 | $86,249 |
| 22 | 34 | 16 | Greg Biffle | Roush Racing | Ford | 500 | 0 | running | 97 | $69,610 |
| 23 | 18 | 20 | Tony Stewart | Joe Gibbs Racing | Chevrolet | 494 | 0 | running | 94 | $119,138 |
| 24 | 28 | 27 | Scott Wimmer | Bill Davis Racing | Chevrolet | 494 | 0 | running | 91 | $65,085 |
| 25 | 21 | 4 | Johnny Sauter | Morgan–McClure Motorsports | Pontiac | 459 | 0 | running | 88 | $67,990 |
| 26 | 30 | 0 | Jason Leffler | Haas CNC Racing | Pontiac | 458 | 0 | running | 85 | $66,815 |
| 27 | 19 | 18 | Bobby Labonte | Joe Gibbs Racing | Chevrolet | 448 | 0 | running | 82 | $107,688 |
| 28 | 1 | 24 | Jeff Gordon | Hendrick Motorsports | Chevrolet | 444 | 179 | crash | 89 | $118,973 |
| 29 | 35 | 30 | Steve Park | Richard Childress Racing | Chevrolet | 440 | 0 | running | 76 | $72,185 |
| 30 | 15 | 77 | Dave Blaney | Jasper Motorsports | Ford | 436 | 0 | running | 73 | $72,335 |
| 31 | 7 | 7 | Ted Musgrave | Ultra Motorsports | Dodge | 430 | 0 | running | 70 | $63,715 |
| 32 | 37 | 99 | Jeff Burton | Roush Racing | Ford | 419 | 0 | running | 67 | $96,547 |
| 33 | 8 | 21 | Ricky Rudd | Wood Brothers Racing | Ford | 415 | 0 | running | 64 | $68,595 |
| 34 | 42 | 45 | Kyle Petty | Petty Enterprises | Dodge | 400 | 0 | running | 61 | $68,560 |
| 35 | 22 | 31 | Robby Gordon | Richard Childress Racing | Chevrolet | 392 | 0 | running | 58 | $86,602 |
| 36 | 2 | 6 | Mark Martin | Roush Racing | Ford | 346 | 49 | crash | 60 | $94,813 |
| 37 | 40 | 54 | Todd Bodine | BelCar Racing | Ford | 315 | 0 | running | 52 | $60,420 |
| 38 | 17 | 38 | Elliott Sadler | Robert Yates Racing | Ford | 305 | 0 | crash | 49 | $94,600 |
| 39 | 33 | 50 | Larry Foyt | A. J. Foyt Enterprises | Dodge | 273 | 0 | crash | 46 | $60,300 |
| 40 | 39 | 1 | Jeff Green | Dale Earnhardt, Inc. | Chevrolet | 193 | 16 | engine | 48 | $85,412 |
| 41 | 43 | 43 | Christian Fittipaldi | Petty Enterprises | Dodge | 175 | 0 | crash | 40 | $95,953 |
| 42 | 3 | 15 | Michael Waltrip | Dale Earnhardt, Inc. | Chevrolet | 87 | 0 | crash | 37 | $78,430 |
| 43 | 20 | 2 | Rusty Wallace | Penske Racing South | Dodge | 87 | 0 | crash | 34 | $94,737 |
Failed to qualify
| 44 | | 02 | Hermie Sadler | SCORE Motorsports | Pontiac | | | | | |
| 45 | | 79 | Billy Bigley | Arnold Motorsports | Dodge | | | | | |
| 46 | | 37 | Derrike Cope | Quest Motor Racing | Chevrolet | | | | | |
| 47 | | 89 | Morgan Shepherd | Shepherd Racing Ventures | Ford | | | | | |
Official race results

| Previous race: 2003 GFS Marketplace 400 | NASCAR Winston Cup Series; 2003 season | Next race: 2003 Mountain Dew Southern 500 |
