= Tim Woods (racing driver) =

American racing driver (born 1974)

- Born: November 11, 1974 (age 51); Chino Hills, California, U.S.

NASCAR FedEx Freight Truck Series career
- 4 races run over 2 years
- Best finish: 77th (2001)
- First race: 2001 John Boy & Billy 250 (South Boston)
- Last race: 2003 Advance Auto Parts 250 (Martinsville)
| Wins | Top tens | Poles |
|---|---|---|
| 0 | 0 | 0 |
- Statistics up to date as of November 12, 2024.

Tim Woods III (born November 11, 1974) is an American former professional stock car racing driver who has previously competed in the NASCAR Craftsman Truck Series and the NASCAR Camping World West Series.

Woods is best known for replacing Kyle Busch during the Truck Series weekend at California Speedway in 2001 due to the event running alongside the CART event, which was sponsored by Marlboro.

Woods has also competed in the NASCAR Southwest Series.

== Motorsports career results ==
=== NASCAR ===
(key) (Bold - Pole position awarded by qualifying time. Italics - Pole position earned by points standings or practice time. * – Most laps led.)

==== Craftsman Truck Series ====
NASCAR Craftsman Truck Series results
| Year | Team | No. | Make | 1 | 2 | 3 | 4 | 5 | 6 | 7 | 8 | 9 | 10 | 11 | 12 | 13 | 14 | 15 | 16 | 17 | 18 | 19 | 20 | 21 | 22 | 23 | 24 | 25 | NCTC | Pts | Ref |
|---|---|---|---|---|---|---|---|---|---|---|---|---|---|---|---|---|---|---|---|---|---|---|---|---|---|---|---|---|---|---|---|
| 2001 | Tim Woods | 54 | Ford | DAY | HOM | MMR | MAR | GTY | DAR | PPR | DOV | TEX | MEM | MLW | KAN | KEN | NHA | IRP | NSH | CIC | NZH | RCH | SBO; 29 | TEX | LVS | PHO | | | 77th | 164 | |
| 2001 | Roush Racing | 99 | Ford | | | | | | | | | | | | | | | | | | | | | | | | CAL; 25 | | 77th | 164 | |
| 2003 | Tim Woods | 54 | Ford | DAY | DAR | MMR; 31 | MAR; 25 | CLT | DOV | TEX | MEM | MLW | KAN | KEN | GTW | MCH | IRP | NSH | BRI | RCH | NHA | CAL | LVS; DNQ | SBO | TEX | MAR | PHO; DNQ | HOM | 111th | 88 | |

==== Busch East Series ====
NASCAR Busch East Series results
| Year | Team | No. | Make | 1 | 2 | 3 | 4 | 5 | 6 | 7 | 8 | 9 | 10 | 11 | 12 | 13 | NBESC | Pts | Ref |
|---|---|---|---|---|---|---|---|---|---|---|---|---|---|---|---|---|---|---|---|
| 2007 | Tim Woods | 54 | Ford | GRE | ELK | IOW; DNQ | SBO | STA | NHA | TMP | NSH | ADI | LRP | MFD | NHA | DOV | N/A | 0 | |

==== Camping World West Series ====
NASCAR Camping World West Series results
| Year | Team | No. | Make | 1 | 2 | 3 | 4 | 5 | 6 | 7 | 8 | 9 | 10 | 11 | 12 | 13 | 14 | NCWWSC | Pts | Ref |
|---|---|---|---|---|---|---|---|---|---|---|---|---|---|---|---|---|---|---|---|---|
| 2000 | Timothy Woods | 51 | Ford | PHO | MMR | LVS | CAL | LAG | IRW | POR | EVG | IRW | RMR | MMR | IRW; 27 | | | 71st | 82 | |
| 2001 | Timothy Woods | 54 | Ford | PHO; 20 | LVS; 16 | TUS; 21 | MMR; 12 | CAL; 22 | IRW; 12 | LAG; 22 | KAN; 13 | EVG | CNS; 14 | IRW; 14 | RMR; 17 | | IRW; 7 | 14th | 1487 | |
| 2001 | Timothy Woods | 51 | Ford | | | | | | | | | | | | | LVS; 27 | | 14th | 1487 | |
| 2002 | Timothy Woods | 54 | Ford | PHO; 10 | LVS; 24 | CAL; 7 | KAN; 14 | EVG; 12 | IRW; 15 | S99 | RMR | DCS | LVS; DNQ | | | | | 15th | 742 | |
| 2003 | Timothy Woods | 54 | Ford | PHO | LVS | CAL; 20 | MAD | TCR | EVG | IRW; 8 | S99; 16 | RMR; 7 | DCS; 8 | PHO; 13 | MMR; 25 | | | 16th | 860 | |
| 2004 | Tim Woods | 54 | Ford | PHO; 6 | MMR; 13 | CAL; 19 | S99; 19 | EVG; 19 | IRW; 2 | S99; 14 | RMR; 22 | DCS; 13 | PHO; 9 | CNS; 13 | MMR; 10 | IRW; 8 | | 9th | 1642 | |
| 2005 | Tim Woods | 54 | Ford | PHO; 11 | MMR; 17 | PHO; 7 | S99; 9 | IRW; 20 | EVG; 4 | S99; 15 | PPR; 6 | CAL; 13 | DCS; 5 | CTS; 12 | MMR; 9 | | | 8th | 1601 | |
| 2006 | Tim Woods | 54 | Ford | PHO | PHO; 15 | S99; 8 | IRW; 4 | SON; 35 | DCS; 4 | IRW; 17* | EVG; 13 | S99; 6 | CAL; 31 | CTS; 7 | AMP; 4 | | | 12th | 1425 | |
| 2007 | Tim Woods | 54 | Ford | CTS; 7 | PHO; 10 | AMP; 3 | ELK; 6 | IOW; DNQ | CNS | SON | DCS | IRW; 24 | MMP | EVG | CSR | AMP | | 20th | 710 | |
| 2008 | Tim Woods | 54 | Ford | AAS; 24 | PHO | CTS | IOW | CNS | SON | IRW; 31 | DCS | EVG | MMP | IRW | AMP | AAS | | 49th | 161 | |
