= Tom Powers (racing driver) =

American racing driver

- Born: September 18, 1959 (age 67); Clayton, Georgia

NASCAR FedEx Freight Truck Series career
- 27 races run over 5 years
- Best finish: 21st (2001)
- First race: 2000 Ram Tough 200 (Gateway)
- Last race: 2002 O'Reilly Auto Parts 250 (Kansas)
Wins	Top tens	Poles
0	0	0

Tom Powers (born September 18, 1959) is an American former stock car racing driver. He drove for his own team in the NASCAR Craftsman Truck Series from 2000 to 2002.

Powers made his debut in the series in 2000. He started 28th and finished 27th in a lone start at Gateway.

Powers stepped it up in 2001, running sixteen races. On the downside, his team was low-budget and struggled throughout the entire season. However, he did have a best finish of 16th at Chicago Motor and had two other top-20 finishes: at Nashville and Kentucky. Powers' main problem was finishing races. His team only finished half of the races they started, leading the team to 21st in 2001 points.

Powers' team still ran on a limited schedule and budget in 2002, only managing to make ten starts. The results were none too bright. His best finishes on the year were a pair of 20ths at Dover and Kansas. Oddly, despite the loss of results, Powers was much more consistent, finishing all but one race in the year. However, the low budget finally forced Powers out of NASCAR after 2002 and Powers has not raced in major NASCAR since.
