= 2001 NASCAR Craftsman Truck Series =

American motorsport season

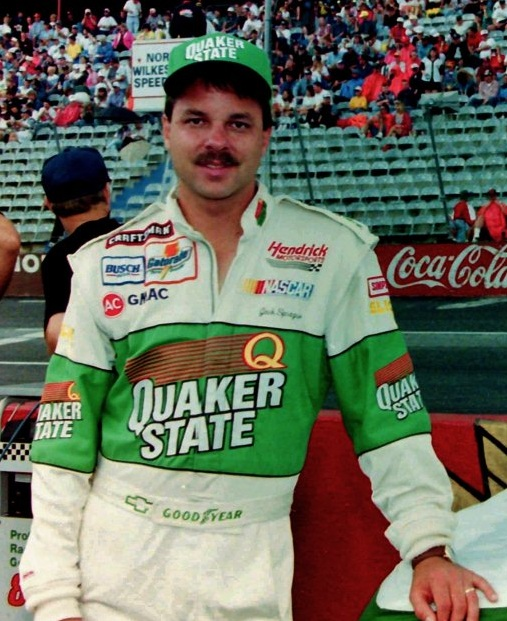
Jack Sprague, the 2001 champion

The 2001 NASCAR Craftsman Truck Series was the seventh season of the Craftsman Truck Series, the third highest stock car racing series sanctioned by NASCAR in the United States. Jack Sprague of Hendrick Motorsports was crowned drivers' champion for the third time.

== 2001 teams and drivers ==
=== Full-time teams ===
Manufacturer	Team	No.	Driver(s)	Crew chief
Chevrolet	Addington Racing	60	Travis Kvapil (R)	Rick Ren
Chevrolet	Green Light Racing	08	Bobby Dotter (R)	Doug Howe
Chevrolet	Hendrick Motorsports	17	Ricky Hendrick (R)	Lance McGrew
Chevrolet	Hendrick Motorsports	24	Jack Sprague	Dennis Connor
Chevrolet	Joe Gibbs Racing	20	Coy Gibbs (R)	Gary Showalter
Chevrolet	L&R Racing	90	Lance Norick	Paul Balmer 10; John Monsam 14
Chevrolet	Morgan-Dollar Motorsports	46	Dennis Setzer	Bill Ingle
Chevrolet	SealMaster Racing	88	Matt Crafton (R)	Jerry Cook
Chevrolet	Spears Motorsports	75	Billy Bigley Jr. (R)	Dave McCarty
Chevrolet	Ware Racing Enterprises	51	Donnie Neuenberger (R) 4	Ken Glen
Chevrolet	Ware Racing Enterprises	51	Michael Ritch 2	Ken Glen
Chevrolet	Ware Racing Enterprises	51	Jonathon Price 2 (Note: Jonathon Price qualified the truck at Martinsville, but was replaced by Coy Gibbs after he failed to qualify in his own No. 20 truck.)	Ken Glen
Chevrolet	Ware Racing Enterprises	51	Coy Gibbs 1	Ken Glen
Chevrolet	Ware Racing Enterprises	51	Jerry Robertson 1	Ken Glen
Chevrolet	Ware Racing Enterprises	51	Brian Rose (R) 15	Ken Glen
Chevrolet	Ware Racing Enterprises	81	Nathan Buttke 8	Cal Northrop
Chevrolet	Ware Racing Enterprises	81	Rich Woodland Jr. 2	Cal Northrop
Chevrolet	Ware Racing Enterprises	81	Sammy Ragan 1	Cal Northrop
Chevrolet	Ware Racing Enterprises	81	Jonathon Price 1	Cal Northrop
Chevrolet	Ware Racing Enterprises	81	Brian Sockwell 2	Cal Northrop
Chevrolet	Ware Racing Enterprises	81	Michael Dokken 4	Cal Northrop
Chevrolet	Ware Racing Enterprises	81	Travis Clark 1	Cal Northrop
Chevrolet	Ware Racing Enterprises	81	Donnie Neuenberger (R) 2	Cal Northrop
Chevrolet	Ware Racing Enterprises	81	Trent Owens 3	Cal Northrop
Dodge	Bobby Hamilton Racing	8	Willy T. Ribbs (R)	James Cox
Dodge	Bobby Hamilton Racing	18	Joe Ruttman	Danny Rollins
Dodge	Petty Enterprises	43	Carlos Contreras	Howard Comstock
Dodge	Ultra Motorsports	1	Ted Musgrave	Fred Wanke
Dodge	Ultra Motorsports	2	Scott Riggs	Tim Kohuth
Ford	Circle Bar Racing	14	Rick Crawford	Ray Stonkus
Ford	K Automotive Racing	29	Terry Cook	Bob Keselowski
Ford	Roush Racing	50	Chuck Hossfeld (R) 9	Dan Binks
Ford	Roush Racing	50	Jon Wood 15	Dan Binks
Ford	Roush Racing	99	Nathan Haseleu (R) 12	Jeff Campey
Ford	Roush Racing	99	Greg Biffle 4	Jeff Campey
Ford	Roush Racing	99	Kurt Busch 1	Jeff Campey
Ford	Roush Racing	99	Kyle Busch 6 (Note: Kyle Busch was entered for Fontana but was declared ineligible to compete after the practice because of his age and the title sponsor the racetrack (Marlboro), and was replaced by Tim Woods III for the rest of the weekend.)	Jeff Campey
Ford	Roush Racing	99	Tim Woods III 1	Jeff Campey
Chevrolet Dodge	MacDonald Motorsports	72	Randy MacDonald 1	Stu Beckett
Chevrolet Dodge	MacDonald Motorsports	72	Rob Morgan 1	Stu Beckett
Chevrolet Dodge	MacDonald Motorsports	72	Steve Portenga 2	Stu Beckett
Chevrolet Dodge	MacDonald Motorsports	72	Jimmy Hensley 17	Stu Beckett
Chevrolet Dodge	MacDonald Motorsports	72	Jerry Hill 2	Stu Beckett
Chevrolet Dodge	MacDonald Motorsports	72	Lance Hooper 1	Stu Beckett

=== Part-time teams ===
Note: If under "team", the owner's name is listed and in italics, that means the name of the race team that fielded the truck is unknown.

Manufacturer	Team	No.	Driver(s)	Crew chief	Rounds
Chevrolet	Bo-Co Performance	74	Bobby Coffey	???	3
Chevrolet	Ken Small	74	Jason Small	???	2
Chevrolet	Burr Motorsports	87	Conrad Burr	????	3
Chevrolet	Conely Racing	7	Stan Boyd	John Conely	1
Chevrolet	Conely Racing	7	Bryan Reffner	John Conely	1
Chevrolet	Dennis Sockwell	54	Brian Sockwell	Todd Hall	2
Chevrolet	EVI Motorsports	89	Stan Boyd	Ed Huckabee	10
Chevrolet	Green Light Racing	07	Gene Christensen	????	7
Chevrolet	Green Light Racing	07	Aaron Daniel	????	1
Chevrolet	Green Light Racing	07	Mike Olsen	????	2
Chevrolet	Green Light Racing	07	Mike Harmon	????	1
Chevrolet	Green Light Racing	07	Donny Morelock	????	1
Chevrolet	Green Light Racing	07	Ronnie Hornaday	????	1
Chevrolet	Hill Motorsports	47	Jerry Hill	????	1
Chevrolet	Horn Auto Racing	58	Chris Horn	????	5
Chevrolet	Jim Mills	70	Jim Mills	????	3
Chevrolet	Jim Mills	70	Morris Coffman	????	1
Chevrolet	Jim Mills	70	Auggie Vidovich	????	1
Chevrolet	Jim Mills	71	Morris Coffman	????	2
Chevrolet	Ware Racing Enterprises	71	Jonathon Price	????	3
Chevrolet	Ware Racing Enterprises	71	Jason Thom	????	3
Chevrolet	Ware Racing Enterprises	71	Michael Dokken	????	2
Chevrolet	Ware Racing Enterprises	71	Brian Sockwell	????	1
Chevrolet	Ware Racing Enterprises	71	G. J. Mennen Jr.	????	1
Chevrolet	Ware Racing Enterprises	91	Jonathon Price	????	1
Chevrolet	Ware Racing Enterprises	91	Michael Ritch	????	1
Chevrolet	Ware Racing Enterprises	91	Michael Dokken	????	1
Chevrolet	Joe Gibbs Racing	48	J. D. Gibbs	????	2
Chevrolet	Keller Motorsports	27	Doug Keller	????	5
Chevrolet	Ken Schrader Racing	52	Lyndon Amick	Kevin Buskirk	2
Chevrolet	Ken Schrader Racing	52	Ken Schrader	Kevin Buskirk	8
Chevrolet	Kevin Harvick Motorsports	6	Kevin Harvick	????	1
Chevrolet	Kevin Harvick Motorsports	6	Rick Carelli	????	1
Chevrolet	Kim Hansen	38	Patrick Lawler	????	1
Chevrolet	Matt Stowe	32	Eric Norris	????	3
Chevrolet	Midgley Racing	09	Mike Hamby	????	3
Chevrolet	McGlynn Racing	00	Ryan McGlynn	Bob Kocher	4
Chevrolet	McGlynn Racing	0	Ed Spencer III	????	1
Chevrolet	Richardson Motorsports	0	Loni Richardson	????	2
Chevrolet	Richardson Motorsports	0	Brian Sockwell	????	1
Chevrolet	Richardson Motorsports	0	Terry Fisher	????	1
Chevrolet	Richardson Motorsports	0	Donny Morelock	????	1
Chevrolet	Portenga Motorsports	39	Steve Portenga	????	1
Chevrolet	Roadrunner Motorsports	02	Jim Inglebright	Rodney Haygood	10
Chevrolet	Ron Hornaday Jr.	94	Ronnie Hornaday	???	5
Chevrolet	Rosenblum Racing	28	Kenny Allen	Nathan Hunter	1
Chevrolet	SealMaster Racing	22	Lance Hooper	????	1
Chevrolet	Spraker Racing	69	Jeff Spraker	????	1
Chevrolet	Tagsby Racing	64	Frog Hall	????	2
Chevrolet	Tagsby Racing	73	Jason Small	Joey Sonntag	4
Chevrolet	Tagsby Racing	73	Frank Kimmel	Joey Sonntag	1
Chevrolet	Tagsby Racing	73	Lance Hooper	Joey Sonntag	11
Chevrolet	Tagsby Racing	73	Frog Hall	Joey Sonntag	1
Chevrolet	Tagsby Racing	73	Sammy Ragan	Joey Sonntag	1
Chevrolet	Tagsby Racing	73	Loni Richardson	Joey Sonntag	1
Chevrolet	Team EJP Racing	03	Tom Carey Jr.	????	8
Chevrolet	Team Menard	3	Bryan Reffner	Les Back	4
Chevrolet	Team Menard	3	David Starr	Les Back	4
Chevrolet	Ronald Jones	34	Eric Jones	????	6
Chevrolet	Team Rensi Motorsports	61	Randy Tolsma	Craig Huartson	15
Chevrolet	Team Rensi Motorsports	61	Vince Whitmire	Craig Huartson	3
Chevrolet	Team Rensi Motorsports	61	Sammy Sanders	Craig Huartson	1
Chevrolet	Team Rensi Motorsports	16	David Donohue (R)	Walter Giles	3
Chevrolet	Xpress Motorsports	16	Mike Bliss	Dave Fuge	1
Dodge	Bobby Hamilton Racing	4	Bobby Hamilton	???	5
Dodge	Bobby Hamilton Racing	4	Bill Lester	???	5
Dodge	Bobby Hamilton Racing	4	Bobby Hamilton Jr.	???	1
Dodge	Bobby Hamilton Racing	4	Sammy Sanders	???	2
Dodge	Bobby Hamilton Racing	4	Preston Tutt	???	1
Dodge	Gerald Miller	32	Jerry Miller	Mike Seibert	2
Dodge	Melling Racing	92	Stacy Compton	Chad Knaus	4
Dodge	Petty Enterprises	44	Rick Carelli	Ritchie Petty	1
Dodge	Powers Motorsports	55	Tom Powers (R)	Bryan Berry	22
Dodge	Tex Racing	10	Mark Petty (R)	Ritchie Petty; Roger Chilton	2
Dodge	TKO Motorsports	41	David Starr	Todd Myers	1
Dodge	TKO Motorsports	41	Brendan Gaughan	Todd Myers	4
Dodge	TKO Motorsports	41	Bryan Reffner	Todd Myers	3
Ford	Billy Ballew Motorsports	15	Jon Wood	Richie Wauters	1
Ford	Billy Ballew Motorsports	15	Derrick Gilchrist	Richie Wauters	1
Ford	Billy Ballew Motorsports	15	Rick Beebe	Richie Wauters	1
Ford	Brevak Racing	31	Michael Dokken	Robert Hamke	4
Ford	Brevak Racing	31	Brad Mueller	Robert Hamke	1
Ford	Covenant Racing Team	49	Trent Owens	???	3
Ford	Doug Hoelzle	85	D. J. Hoelzle	???	2
Ford	Milan Garrett	85	Milan Garrett	???	1
Ford	Frank Cioppettini	53	G. J. Mennen Jr.	Gary Montesi	3
Ford	Pro Motion Motorsports	53	Randy Briggs	????	1
Ford	Ferrell Lee	10	Mark Gibson	???	1
Ford	Genzman Racing 1 Shepherd Racing 15	21	Morgan Shepherd	???	16
Ford	Left Turns Motorsports	19	Ricky Sanders (R)	Tom Broome	14
Ford	Hill Motorsports	41	Jerry Hill	????	3
Ford	Hill Motorsports	41	Jimmy Burns	????	1
Ford	James Stephenson	36	James Stephenson	???	1
Ford	Long Brothers Racing	84	Richard Landreth	Charlie Long	1
Ford	Long Brothers Racing	84	Chad Chaffin	Charlie Long	2
Ford	Long Brothers Racing	84	Nick Woodward	Charlie Long	2
Ford	Long Brothers Racing	84	Elliott Sadler	Charlie Long	1
Ford	PVR Motorsports	35	Phillip Young	????	1
Ford	PVR Motorsports	35	Clay Young	????	2
Ford	Quest Motor Racing	37	Damon Lusk	????	1
Ford	Raptor Performance Motorsports	9	Lance Hooper	Marty Walsh	4
Ford	Team BCR Racing	30	Howard Bixman	????	2
Ford	Tim Woods III	54	Tim Woods III	????	1
Ford	Vicki Morgan	47	Scotty Sands	????	1
Chevrolet Dodge	Bill McAnally Racing	62	Brendan Gaughan	Shane Wilson	3
Chevrolet Dodge	R&J Racing	68	Rodney Sawyers	????	8
Chevrolet Dodge	Troxell Racing	93	Wayne Edwards	????	2
Chevrolet Dodge	Troxell Racing	93	Jonathon Price	????	1
Chevrolet Dodge	Troxell Racing	93	Tim Zock	????	1
Chevrolet Dodge	Troxell Racing	93	Larry Gunselman	????	1
Chevrolet Dodge	Troxell Racing	93	Mike Leffingwell	????	1
Chevrolet Dodge	Troxell Racing	93	Mike Harmon	????	1
Chevrolet Dodge	Troxell Racing	93	Jason White	????	1
Chevrolet Dodge	Troxell Racing	93	Donny Morelock	????	1
Chevrolet Dodge	Troxell Racing	93	Dale Shaw	????	1
Chevrolet Dodge	Troxell Racing	93	Roland Isaacs	????	1
Chevrolet Dodge	Troxell Racing	93	Jerry Hill	????	8
Chevrolet Ford	MB Motorsports	63	Larry Gunselman (R)	Mike Mittler	17
Chevrolet Ford	MB Motorsports	63	Mike Harmon	Mike Mittler	1
Chevrolet Ford	Phelon Motorsports	66	Rick Carelli	John Monsam	4
Chevrolet Ford	Team 23 Racing	23	Loni Richardson	Phil Bonifield	2
Chevrolet Ford	Team 23 Racing	23	Dana White	Phil Bonifield	2
Chevrolet Ford	Team 23 Racing	23	Ron Barfield Jr.	Phil Bonifield	1
Chevrolet Ford	Team 23 Racing	23	Michael Dokken	Phil Bonifield	1
Chevrolet Ford	Team 23 Racing	23	Lance Hooper	Phil Bonifield	1
Chevrolet Ford	Team 23 Racing	23	Phil Bonifield	???	9
Dodge Ford Chevrolet	Impact Motorsports	12	Rich Woodland Jr.	???	1
Dodge Ford Chevrolet	Impact Motorsports	12	Jason Thom	???	1
Dodge Ford Chevrolet	Impact Motorsports	25	Barry Bodine	???	2
Dodge Ford Chevrolet	Impact Motorsports	25	Phil Bonifield	???	4 (Note: Entries were fielded in a collaboration with Team 23 Racing.)
Dodge Ford Chevrolet	Impact Motorsports	25	Jonathon Price	???	1
Dodge Ford Chevrolet	Impact Motorsports	25	Lance Hooper	???	1
Dodge Ford Chevrolet	Impact Motorsports	86	Derrike Cope	Dave Fuge Jr.	2
Dodge Ford Chevrolet	Impact Motorsports	86	Jason White	Dave Fuge Jr.	6
Dodge Ford Chevrolet	Impact Motorsports	86	Randy Briggs	Dave Fuge Jr.	1
Dodge Ford Chevrolet	Impact Motorsports	86	Dana White	Dave Fuge Jr.	5
Dodge Ford Chevrolet	Impact Motorsports	86	Rich Woodland Jr.	Dave Fuge Jr.	1
Dodge Ford Chevrolet	Impact Motorsports	86	Phil Bonifield	Dave Fuge Jr.	2

== Schedule ==
No.	Race title	Track	Date
1	Florida Dodge Dealers 250	Daytona International Speedway, Daytona Beach	February 16
2	Florida Dodge Dealers 400K	Homestead-Miami Speedway, Homestead	March 4
3	OSH 250	Mesa Marin Raceway, Bakersfield	March 17
4	Advance Auto Parts 250	Martinsville Speedway, Ridgeway	April 7
5	Ram Tough 200 presented by Pepsi	Gateway International Raceway, Madison	May 6
6	Darlington 200	Darlington Raceway, Darlington	May 12
7	Jelly Belly 200	Pikes Peak International Raceway, Fountain	May 20
8	MBNA E-Commerce 200	Dover International Speedway, Dover	June 2
9	O'Reilly 400K	Texas Motor Speedway, Fort Worth	June 8
10	Memphis 200	Memphis International Raceway, Millington	June 23
11	GNC Live Well 200	The Milwaukee Mile, West Allis	June 30
12	O'Reilly Auto Parts 250	Kansas Speedway, Kansas City	July 7
13	Kroger 225	Kentucky Speedway, Sparta	July 14
14	New England 200	New Hampshire International Speedway, Loudon	July 21
15	Power Stroke Diesel 200	Indianapolis Raceway Park, Brownsburg	August 3
16	Federated Auto Parts 200	Nashville Superspeedway, Lebanon	August 10
17	Sears Craftsman 175	Chicago Motor Speedway, Cicero	August 18
18	Chevy Silverado 200	Nazareth Speedway, Nazareth	August 26
19	Kroger 200	Richmond International Raceway, Richmond	September 6
20	John Boy & Billy's Hardee's 250	South Boston Speedway, South Boston	September 28
21	Silverado 350K	Texas Motor Speedway, Fort Worth	October 5
22	Orleans 350	Las Vegas Motor Speedway, Las Vegas	October 14
23	Chevy Silverado 150	Phoenix International Raceway, Phoenix	October 26
24	Auto Club 200	California Speedway, Fontana	November 3

== Races ==
=== Florida Dodge Dealers 250 ===
The Florida Dodge Dealers 250 was held on February 16 at Daytona International Speedway. Joe Ruttman won the pole.

Top 10 Results

1. #18 - Joe Ruttman
2. #17 - Ricky Hendrick
3. #2 - Scott Riggs
4. #90 - Lance Norick
5. #61 - Randy Tolsma
6. #29 - Terry Cook
7. #20 - Coy Gibbs
8. #3 - Bryan Reffner
9. #52 - Lyndon Amick
10. #14 - Rick Crawford

Failed to qualify: Ricky Sanders (#19), Tom Powers (#55), Jason Small (#73), Lance Hooper (#9), Kenny Allen (#28), Ryan McGlynn (#00)

=== Florida Dodge Dealers 400K ===
The Florida Dodge Dealers 400K was held March 4 at Homestead-Miami Speedway. Scott Riggs won the pole.

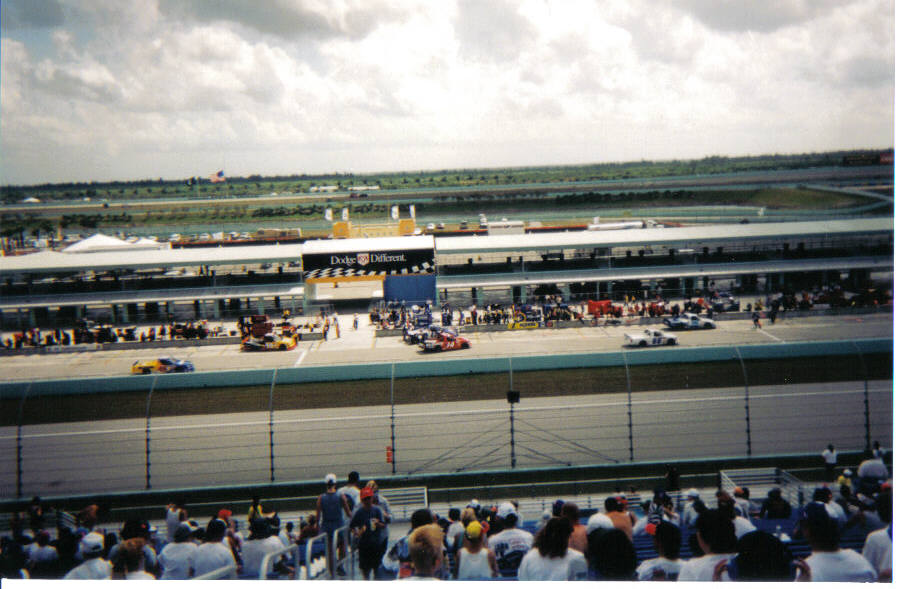
Pit Stops during the 2001 Florida Dodge Dealers 400k at the Homestead-Miami Speedway.

Top 10 Results

1. #1 - Ted Musgrave*
2. #60 - Travis Kvapil
3. #24 - Jack Sprague
4. #2 - Scott Riggs
5. #17 - Ricky Hendrick
6. #61 - Randy Tolsma
7. #43 - Carlos Contreras
8. #14 - Rick Crawford
9. #18 - Joe Ruttman
10. #29 - Terry Cook

Failed to qualify: none

- This was Musgrave's first victory in a NASCAR top-touring series.

=== OSH 250 ===
The OSH 250 was held March 17 at Mesa Marin Raceway. Ted Musgrave won the pole.

Top 10 Results

1. #1 - Ted Musgrave
2. #24 - Jack Sprague
3. #62 - Brendan Gaughan
4. #66 - Rick Carelli
5. #2 - Scott Riggs
6. #18 - Joe Ruttman
7. #29 - Terry Cook
8. #17 - Ricky Hendrick
9. #75 - Billy Bigley Jr.
10. #61 - Randy Tolsma

Failed to qualify: none

=== Advance Auto Parts 250 ===
The Advance Auto Parts 250 was held April 7 at Martinsville Speedway. Joe Ruttman won the pole.

Top 10 Results

1. #2 - Scott Riggs*
2. #60 - Travis Kvapil
3. #29 - Terry Cook
4. #18 - Joe Ruttman
5. #61 - Randy Tolsma
6. #88 - Matt Crafton
7. #14 - Rick Crawford
8. #3 - Bryan Reffner
9. #17 - Ricky Hendrick
10. #99 - Nathan Haseleu

Failed to qualify: Brian Sockwell (#54), Willy T. Ribbs (#8), Coy Gibbs (#20), Stan Boyd (#7), Dana White (#23), Jim Mills (#70), Rodney Sawyers (#68).

- This was Riggs' first career Truck Series victory.
- Coy Gibbs drove the #51 qualified by Jonathon Price for the race after failing to qualify his regular #20.

=== Ram Tough 200 presented by Pepsi ===
The Ram Tough 200 presented by Pepsi was held May 6 at Gateway International Raceway. Ted Musgrave won the pole.

Top 10 Results

1. #1 - Ted Musgrave
2. #2 - Scott Riggs
3. #29 - Terry Cook
4. #14 - Rick Crawford
5. #60 - Travis Kvapil
6. #17 - Ricky Hendrick
7. #88 - Matt Crafton
8. #24 - Jack Sprague
9. #46 - Dennis Setzer
10. #75 - Billy Bigley Jr.

Failed to qualify: none

=== Darlington 200 ===
The Darlington 200 was held May 12 at Darlington Raceway. Jack Sprague won the pole.

Top 10 Results

1. #4 - Bobby Hamilton
2. #52 - Ken Schrader
3. #2 - Scott Riggs
4. #14 - Rick Crawford
5. #18 - Joe Ruttman
6. #60 - Travis Kvapil
7. #29 - Terry Cook
8. #88 - Matt Crafton
9. #75 - Billy Bigley Jr.
10. #99 - Nathan Haseleu

Failed to qualify: none

=== Jelly Belly 200 ===
The Jelly Belly 200 was held May 20 at Pikes Peak International Raceway. Scott Riggs won the pole.

Top 10 Results

1. #18 - Joe Ruttman
2. #2 - Scott Riggs
3. #24 - Jack Sprague
4. #1 - Ted Musgrave
5. #17 - Ricky Hendrick
6. #88 - Matt Crafton
7. #60 - Travis Kvapil
8. #46 - Dennis Setzer
9. #14 - Rick Crawford
10. #50 - Chuck Hossfeld

Failed to qualify: none, only 34 entries

=== MBNA E-Commerce 200 ===
The MBNA E-Commerce 200 was held June 2 at Dover International Speedway. Scott Riggs won the pole.

Top 10 Results

1. #2 - Scott Riggs
2. #24 - Jack Sprague
3. #17 - Ricky Hendrick
4. #1 - Ted Musgrave
5. #20 - Coy Gibbs
6. #92 - Stacy Compton
7. #52 - Ken Schrader
8. #18 - Joe Ruttman
9. #88 - Matt Crafton
10. #60 - Travis Kvapil

Failed to qualify: none

=== O'Reilly 400K ===
The O'Reilly 400K was held June 8 at Texas Motor Speedway. Scott Riggs won the pole.

Top 10 Results

1. #24 - Jack Sprague
2. #41 - Brendan Gaughan
3. #3 - David Starr
4. #18 - Joe Ruttman
5. #17 - Ricky Hendrick
6. #1 - Dennis Setzer
7. #20 - Coy Gibbs
8. #61 - Randy Tolsma
9. #43 - Carlos Contreras
10. #99 - Nathan Haseleu

Failed to qualify: Frog Hall (#64)

=== Memphis 200 ===
The Memphis 200 was held June 23 at Memphis Motorsports Park. Jack Sprague won the pole.

Top 10 Results

1. #46 - Dennis Setzer
2. #2 - Scott Riggs
3. #18 - Joe Ruttman
4. #84 - Chad Chaffin
5. #20 - Coy Gibbs
6. #1 - Ted Musgrave
7. #17 - Ricky Hendrick
8. #90 - Lance Norick
9. #99 - Greg Biffle
10. #88 - Matt Crafton

Failed to qualify: none, only 32 entries

=== GNC Live Well 200 ===
The GNC Live Well 200 was held June 30 at The Milwaukee Mile. Jack Sprague won the pole.

Top 10 Results

1. #1 - Ted Musgrave
2. #24 - Jack Sprague
3. #60 - Travis Kvapil
4. #29 - Terry Cook
5. #99 - Kurt Busch
6. #18 - Joe Ruttman
7. #75 - Billy Bigley Jr.
8. #52 - Ken Schrader
9. #88 - Matt Crafton
10. #17 - Ricky Hendrick

Failed to qualify: none, only 35 entries

=== O'Reilly Auto Parts 250 ===
The O'Reilly Auto Parts 250 was held July 7 at Kansas Speedway. Dennis Setzer won the pole.

Top 10 Results

1. #17 - Ricky Hendrick*
2. #1 - Ted Musgrave
3. #46 - Dennis Setzer
4. #50 - Jon Wood
5. #75 - Billy Bigley Jr.
6. #60 - Travis Kvapil
7. #2 - Scott Riggs
8. #14 - Rick Crawford
9. #20 - Coy Gibbs
10. #99 - Nathan Haseleu

Failed to qualify: Doug Keller (#27), Loni Richardson (#0)

- This was Hendrick's first and only career NASCAR top-touring series victory.

=== Kroger 225 ===
The Kroger 225 was held July 14 at Kentucky Speedway. Jack Sprague won the pole.

Top 10 Results

1. #2 - Scott Riggs
2. #18 - Joe Ruttman
3. #24 - Jack Sprague
4. #60 - Travis Kvapil
5. #46 - Dennis Setzer
6. #17 - Ricky Hendrick
7. #50 - Jon Wood
8. #61 - Randy Tolsma
9. #29 - Terry Cook
10. #75 - Billy Bigley Jr.

Failed to qualify: Michael Dokken (#71), Phil Bonifield (#23), Conrad Burr (#87), Rodney Sawyers (#68)

=== New England 200 ===
The New England 200 was held July 21 at New Hampshire International Speedway. Jack Sprague won the pole.

Top 10 Results

1. #24 - Jack Sprague
2. #60 - Travis Kvapil
3. #46 - Dennis Setzer
4. #17 - Ricky Hendrick
5. #1 - Ted Musgrave
6. #29 - Terry Cook
7. #52 - Ken Schrader
8. #18 - Joe Ruttman
9. #92 - Stacy Compton
10. #88 - Matt Crafton

Failed to qualify: none, only 33 entries

=== Power Stroke Diesel 200 ===
The Power Stroke Diesel 200 was held August 3 at Indianapolis Raceway Park. Joe Ruttman won the pole.

Top 10 Results

1. #24 - Jack Sprague
2. #29 - Terry Cook
3. #18 - Joe Ruttman
4. #4 - Bobby Hamilton
5. #60 - Travis Kvapil
6. #14 - Rick Crawford
7. #88 - Matt Crafton
8. #46 - Dennis Setzer
9. #99 - Kyle Busch*
10. #08 - Bobby Dotter

Failed to qualify: Jim Mills (#70), Howard Bixman (#30), Mike Harmon (#07), G. J. Mennen Jr. (#53), Scotty Sands (#47), Morris Coffman (#71), Bobby Coffey (#74)

- Sixteen-year old Kyle Busch made his NASCAR debut in this race.

=== Federated Auto Parts 200 ===
The Federated Auto Parts 200 was held August 10 at Nashville Superspeedway. Scott Riggs won the pole.

Top 10 Results

1. #2 - Scott Riggs
2. #1 - Ted Musgrave
3. #14 - Rick Crawford
4. #18 - Joe Ruttman
5. #60 - Travis Kvapil
6. #29 - Terry Cook
7. #99 - Greg Biffle
8. #1 - Dennis Setzer
9. #90 - Lance Norick
10. #20 - Coy Gibbs

Failed to qualify: Donny Morelock (#07) - Withdrew

=== Sears Craftsman 175 ===
The Sears Craftsman 175 was held August 18 at Chicago Motor Speedway. Joe Ruttman won the pole.

Top 10 Results

1. #2 - Scott Riggs
2. #46 - Dennis Setzer
3. #90 - Lance Norick
4. #60 - Travis Kvapil
5. #14 - Rick Crawford
6. #29 - Terry Cook
7. #1 - Ted Musgrave
8. #18 - Joe Ruttman
9. #24 - Jack Sprague
10. #41 - Brendan Gaughan

Failed to qualify: Mark Gibson (#10), Mike Hamby (#09)

=== Chevy Silverado 200 ===
The Chevy Silverado 200 was held August 26 at Nazareth Speedway. Terry Cook won the pole.

Top 10 Results

1. #99 - Greg Biffle
2. #29 - Terry Cook
3. #24 - Jack Sprague
4. #14 - Rick Crawford
5. #17 - Ricky Hendrick
6. #50 - Jon Wood
7. #75 - Billy Bigley Jr.
8. #1 - Ted Musgrave
9. #18 - Joe Ruttman
10. #90 - Lance Hooper

Failed to qualify: Clay Young (#35), Ed Spencer III (#0)

=== Kroger 200 ===
The Kroger 200 was held September 6 at Richmond International Raceway. Dennis Setzer won the pole.

Top 10 Results

1. #24 - Jack Sprague
2. #6 - Kevin Harvick
3. #46 - Dennis Setzer
4. #1 - Ted Musgrave
5. #14 - Rick Crawford
6. #92 - Stacy Compton
7. #4 - Bobby Hamilton
8. #17 - Ricky Hendrick
9. #18 - Joe Ruttman
10. #75 - Billy Bigley Jr.

Failed to qualify: Tom Powers (#55), Jimmy Burns (#41), Bobby Coffey (#74), Jeff Spraker (#69)

=== NetZero 250 presented by John Boy & Billy ===
The NetZero 250 presented by John Boy & Billy was held September 28 at South Boston Speedway. Jack Sprague won the pole.

Top 10 Results

1. #1 - Ted Musgrave
2. #46 - Dennis Setzer
3. #2 - Scott Riggs
4. #24 - Jack Sprague
5. #18 - Joe Ruttman
6. #17 - Ricky Hendrick
7. #29 - Terry Cook
8. #60 - Travis Kvapil
9. #16 - Mike Bliss
10. #88 - Matt Crafton

Failed to qualify: James Stephenson (#36)

=== Silverado 350K ===
The Silverado 350 was held October 5 at Texas Motor Speedway. Scott Riggs won the pole.

Top 10 Results

1. #60 - Travis Kvapil*
2. #14 - Rick Crawford
3. #24 - Jack Sprague
4. #3 - David Starr
5. #90 - Lance Norick
6. #46 - Dennis Setzer
7. #20 - Coy Gibbs
8. #17 - Ricky Hendrick
9. #18 - Joe Ruttman
10. #1 - Ted Musgrave

Failed to qualify: Eric Jones (#34), Tom Powers (#55)

- This was Kvapil's first truck series victory.

=== Orleans 350 ===
The Orleans 350 was held October 14 at Las Vegas Motor Speedway. Jack Sprague won the pole.

Top 10 Results

1. #1 - Ted Musgrave
2. #24 - Jack Sprague
3. #60 - Travis Kvapil
4. #2 - Scott Riggs
5. #14 - Rick Crawford
6. #17 - Ricky Hendrick
7. #3 - David Starr
8. #18 - Joe Ruttman
9. #99 - Kurt Busch
10. #46 - Dennis Setzer

Failed to qualify: Tom Powers (#55), Michael Dokken (#23), Mike Hamby (#09), Donny Morelock (#0)

=== Chevy Silverado 150 ===
The Chevy Silverado 150 was held October 26 at Phoenix International Raceway. Stacy Compton won the pole.

Top 10 Results

1. #99 - Greg Biffle
2. #24 - Jack Sprague
3. #14 - Rick Crawford
4. #92 - Stacy Compton
5. #41 - Bryan Reffner
6. #1 - Ted Musgrave
7. #29 - Terry Cook
8. #2 - Scott Riggs
9. #60 - Travis Kvapil
10. #52 - Ken Schrader

Failed to qualify: Eric Jones (#34), Auggie Vidovich (#70), D. J. Hoelzle (#85), G. J. Mennen Jr. (#53), Tom Powers (#55), Jerry Hill (#93), Phil Bonifield (#25), Gene Christensen (#07)

=== Auto Club 200 ===
The Auto Club 200 was held November 3 at California Speedway. Scott Riggs won the pole.

Top 10 Results

1. #1 - Ted Musgrave
2. #14 - Rick Crawford
3. #50 - Jon Wood
4. #46 - Dennis Setzer
5. #3 - David Starr
6. #29 - Terry Cook
7. #60 - Travis Kvapil
8. #02 - Jim Inglebright
9. #88 - Matt Crafton
10. #17 - Ricky Hendrick
- Kyle Busch was the fastest in practice when he was ejected from the track by CART officials because the American Racing Wheels 200 was part of a CART weekend featuring the Marlboro 500 CART FedEx Championship Series event. Marlboro threw Busch out of the garage because of an interpretation of the Master Settlement Agreement of 1998, prohibiting persons under 18 years of age in participating in events sponsored by tobacco companies. Tim Woods III ultimately took over Busch's #99 truck for the race. In the aftermath, NASCAR subsequently set a minimum age limit of 18 across all top three national series the following season, primarily as the Cup Series was also then sponsored by another cigarette brand.
- This was the last time the Truck Series concluded at California. From 2002 to 2019, all three series have had the season finale at the Homestead-Miami Speedway.

Failed to qualify: Ronnie Hornaday (#07), Mike Hamby (#09), Tom Powers (#55), Conrad Burr (#87), G. J. Mennen Jr. (#71), Phil Bonifield (#23)

- Phil Bonifield replaced an unknown driver in the #86 car in the race, after failing to qualify his #23.

== Full Drivers' Championship ==
(key) Bold – Pole position awarded by time. Italics – Pole position set by owner's points. * – Most laps led.

Pos	Driver	DAY	HOM	MMR	MAR	GTY	DAR	PPR	DOV	TEX	MEM	MLW	KAN	KEN	NHA	IRP	NSH	CIC	NZH	RCH	SBO	TEX	LVS	PHO	CAL	Points
1	Jack Sprague	12	3	2	20	8	**12**	3*	2*	1*	**23***	**2***	23*	**3**	**1***	1*	21	9	3	1*	**4**	3	**2***	2*	31	3670
2	Ted Musgrave	22	1*	**1***	22	**1***	31	4	4	14	6	1	2	24*	5	23	2	7	8	4	1*	10	1	6	1	3597
3	Joe Ruttman	**1***	9	6	**4**	12	5	1	8	4	3	6	24	2	8	**3**	4	**8**	9	9	5	9	8	12	16	3570
4	Travis Kvapil **(R)**	25	2	11	2	5	6	7	10	11	12	3	6	4	2	5	5	4	24	11	8	1	3	9	7	3547
5	Scott Riggs	3	**4**	5	1*	2	3	2	**1**	26	2	24	7	1	24	21	**1***	1	13	14	3	**13***	4	8	**32**	3526
6	Ricky Hendrick **(R)**	2	5	8	9	6	34	5	3	5	7	10	1	6	4	18	11	11	5	8	6	8	6	28	10	3412
7	Terry Cook	6	10	7	3	3	7	11	11	13	25	4	20	9	6	2	6	6	**2**	31	7	22	13	7	6	3327
8	Rick Crawford	10	8	19	7	4	4	9	14	20	16	25	8	27	27	6	3	5*	4	5	24	2	5	3	2	3320
9	Dennis Setzer	24	17	31	19	9	14	8	13	6	1	11	**3**	5	3	8	8	2	15	**3**	2	6	10	29	4	3306
10	Coy Gibbs	7	11	13	26	22	15	31	5	7	5	13	9	19	14	13	10	23	20	18	12	7	12	31	14	2875
11	Lance Norick	4	13	27	27	14	20	23	17	12	8	17	11	18	16	15	9	3	21	28	13	5	14	16	27	2820
12	Matt Crafton **(R)**	27	26	30	6	7	8	6	9	16	10	9	22	21	10	7	25	26	22	32	10	12	28	15	9	2778
13	Billy Bigley Jr. **(R)**	26	24	9	16	10	9	25	25	22	11	7	5	10	15	29	23	32	7	10	15	18	16	32	11	2718
14	Carlos Contreras	20	7	22	11	21	27	29	12	9	27	22	12	16	21	14	17	15	16	23	17	23	20	21	22	2586
15	Bobby Dotter	14	21	17	33	24	16	15	15	23	18	27	25	26	20	10	18	13	25	15	11	15	19	27	15	2537
16	Willy T. Ribbs **(R)**	23	19	28	DNQ	20	29	13	19	25	17	18	15	30	18	20	24	28	18	20	28	19	25	19	18	2319
17	Jon Wood **(R)**				31						14	12	4	7	19	27	16	12	6	13	14	24	29	14	3	1917
18	Randy Tolsma	5	6	10	5	11	13	28	28	8	13	30	13	8	12	19										1859
19	Lance Hooper	DNQ	15	12	24		30	16	16	15	22	35		36			12	14	10	17		26	31	36	33	1720
20	Jimmy Hensley				25	13	33	14	26	32	15	26		13				25	14	16	25	14	15	20	30	1708
21	Tom Powers	DNQ	29	35		33	35	30	32	33	21	23	21	20	22	25	19	16	29	DNQ		DNQ	DNQ	DNQ	DNQ	1627
22	Brian Rose **(R)**										28	28	19	15	23	22	15	19	19	24	20	28	26	23	12	1487
23	Larry Gunselman **(R)**	18	36	26	17	23	36	32		30		19	16	22	31	31		24	33			35	33		29	1461
24	Nathan Haseleu **(R)**	29	14	14	10	27	10	12	21	10			10	12	13											1419
25	Jerry Hill						26		27					17	28	24	28	18	26	29	21	17	32	DNQ	21	1214
26	Morgan Shepherd	11			36		21		24	21	29		32	31	17	33	26	33	28	21	27			30		1146
27	Ricky Sanders	DNQ	34		34	25	32	34	22	24			35	25			20	21	23		31					1091
28	Ken Schrader				29	17	2		7			8			7					12				10		1053
29	Jim Inglebright			15		29		26				14		14		16		31					30	17	8	1033
30	Bryan Reffner	8	28	18	8																	20	18	5	20	952
31	Brendan Gaughan			3		15				2			26					10					11	13		946
32	Chuck Hossfeld **(R)**	19	20	20	18	19	24	10	23	27																933
33	Phil Bonifield					35		33	34	31		31	31	DNQ	32		27				36	31	24	DNQ	24	932
34	Michael Dokken	33	22		30	32								DNQ	26		31	27	11		16		DNQ		17	884
35	Stan Boyd				DNQ	30				28				29		36		36	35			16	17	35	13	848
36	Tom Carey Jr.							27				21			11	12			12	19				26	26	847
37	Nathan Buttke	31	16	29	23	26	19	17	18																	767
38	Bobby Hamilton				15*		1*								25	4				7						707
39	Rodney Sawyers				DNQ		18		20					DNQ		17			17	33	18					689
40	Rick Carelli	13	30	4	12															34				11		675
41	Greg Biffle										9						7		1*					1*		664
42	Kyle Busch															9		17		22	33	25	9		RP	642
43	Jason White **(R)**			16	13	31	25	18	29				36													637
44	Stacy Compton								6						9					6				**4**		598
45	Ronnie Hornaday	21	18		14		11									30									DNQ	585
46	Jonathon Price			23	QL			22	33			20			30	32			32				36			556
47	David Starr	34								3												4	7		5	541
48	Dana White				DNQ						20					26		34		35	23			25		529
49	Trent Owens							19		18			34										27	34	19	525
50	Donnie Neuenberger	15					28		30	19										26		36				516
51	Brian Sockwell	17			DNQ					35			33	28								21				465
52	Chris Horn							24				16	27	33									21			457
53	Jason Small **(R)**	DNQ	25	33	28								29											24		444
54	Eric Jones											29						30				DNQ	23	DNQ	28	426
55	Doug Keller												DNQ	23				22				29	22			413
56	Jason Thom				21						19							20					34			370
57	Loni Richardson		31	34		28							DNQ											33		326
58	Ryan McGlynn	DNQ			35									11					27							307
59	Bill Lester **(R)**					36		20									30				32			18		304
60	Chad Chaffin										4						14									281
61	Rich Woodland Jr.	35								34							22					33				280
62	Eric Norris									17												32			23	273
63	Gene Christensen									36	30	32		35				35					35	DNQ		272
64	Michael Ritch		33			16															26					269
65	Lyndon Amick	9															13									267
66	Vince Whitmore																			27	30			22		252
67	Steve Portenga			32									14												34	249
68	David Donohue	28	35	21																						237
69	Nick Woodward															11					19					236
70	G. J. Mennen Jr.															DNQ					22			DNQ	DNQ	223
71	Derrike Cope	16	23																							209
72	Barry Bodine	36	12																							182
73	Randy Briggs												18									30				182
74	Jim Mills			24	DNQ											DNQ										180
75	Donny Morelock													32			DNQ						DNQ			177
76	Mike Harmon								35			34				DNQ										165
77	Tim Woods III																				29				25	164
78	Frog Hall									DNQ			28									27				161
79	Kurt Busch											5														155
80	Bobby Coffey										32					DNQ				DNQ						150
81	J. D. Gibbs						23													36						149
82	Mike Olsen														29				30							149
83	Sammy Ragan										26					34										146
84	Kevin Harvick																			2						
85	Howard Bixman										24					DNQ										140
86	Mike Bliss																				9					138
87	D. J. Hoelzle																			25				DNQ		134
88	Mark Petty **(R)**	32	32																							134
89	Damon Lusk																					11				130
90	Sammy Sanders													34					31						36	125
91	Wayne Edwards					34																			35	119
92	Brad Mueller											15														118
93	Clay Young																		DNQ		34					113
94	Derrick Gilchrist						17																			112
95	Aaron Daniel												17													112
96	Jerry Miller								36										36							110
97	Frank Kimmel					18																				109
98	Jerry Robertson							21																		100
99	Ron Barfield Jr.						22																			97
100	Milan Garrett			25																						88
101	Conrad Burr													DNQ					34						DNQ	86
102	Rob Morgan		27																							82
103	Travis Clark															28										79
104	Patrick Lawler									29																76
105	Preston Tott																	29								76
106	Randy MacDonald	30																								73
107	Elliott Sadler																			30						73
108	Mike Leffingwell										31															70
109	Richard Landreth				32																					67
110	Dale Shaw														33											64
111	Terry Fisher																					34				61
112	Roland Isaacs															35										58
113	Morris Coffman			36												DNQ					35					55
114	Phillip Young																29									
115	Rick Beebe												30													
116	Tim Zock								31																	
117	Bobby Hamilton Jr.											33														
118	Kenny Allen	DNQ																								
119	Scotty Sands															DNQ										
120	Mark Gibson																	DNQ								
121	Mike Hamby																	DNQ					DNQ		DNQ	
122	Ed Spencer III																		DNQ							
123	Jimmy Burns																			DNQ						
124	Jeff Spraker																			DNQ						
125	James Stephenson																				DNQ					
126	Auggie Vidovich																							DNQ		
Pos	Driver	DAY	HOM	MMR	MAR	GTY	DAR	PPR	DOV	TEX	MEM	MLW	KAN	KEN	NHA	IRP	NSH	CIC	NZH	RCH	SBO	TEX	LVS	PHO	CAL	Points

== Rookie of the Year ==
After winning once and finishing fourth in points, Travis Kvapil of Addington Racing was named the Truck Series Rookie of the Year, narrowly defeating Ricky Hendrick, teammate to champion Jack Sprague. Matt Crafton and Billy Bigley Jr. both posted several top-tens during the season and finished close to each other in points. Jon Wood, Brian Rose, Larry Gunselman, and Ricky Sanders all made limited runs, while Willy T. Ribbs became the first African American to make a full-time bid for the Craftsman Truck Series championship. Chuck Hossfeld and Nathan Haseleu signed to drive for Roush Racing after winning its "Gong Show" competition, but were released early in the season.

== See also ==
- 2001 NASCAR Winston Cup Series
- 2001 NASCAR Busch Series
- 2001 ARCA Re/Max Series
- 2001 NASCAR Goody's Dash Series
