= Billy Bigley =

American racing driver (born 1962)

Billy Bigley Jr.
- Born: June 9, 1962 (age 64)

NASCAR FedEx Freight Truck Series career
- 24 races run over 1 year
- Best finish: 13th (2001)
- First race: 2001 Florida Dodge Dealers 250 (Daytona)
- Last race: 2001 Auto Club 200 (Fontana)
Wins	Top tens	Poles
0	8	0
- Statistics up to date as of July 22, 2011.

Billy Bigley Jr. (born June 9, 1962) is an American racing driver who resides in Naples, Florida and competed in the NASCAR Craftsman Truck Series.

Bigley competed in the entire 2001 NASCAR Craftsman Truck Series schedule for Spears Motorsports. He finished thirteenth in points with a best finish of fifth at Kansas Speedway. He also made two ARCA starts that year for Spears Motorsports, winning his debut at the Memphis Motorsports Park and finishing seventh at Kentucky Speedway.

Bigley later competed in the USARacing Pro Cup Series Southern Division.

== Motorsports career results ==
=== NASCAR ===
(key) (Bold – Pole position awarded by qualifying time. Italics – Pole position earned by points standings or practice time. * – Most laps led.)

==== Winston Cup Series ====
NASCAR Winston Cup Series results
Year	Team	No.	Make	1	2	3	4	5	6	7	8	9	10	11	12	13	14	15	16	17	18	19	20	21	22	23	24	25	26	27	28	29	30	31	32	33	34	35	36	NWCC	Pts	Ref
2003	Arnold Motorsports	79	Dodge	DAY	CAR	LVS	ATL	DAR	BRI	TEX	TAL	MAR	CAL	RCH	CLT	DOV	POC	MCH	SON	DAY	CHI	NHA	POC	IND; DNQ	GLN	MCH	BRI; DNQ	DAR	RCH; DNQ	NHA	DOV; DNQ	TAL	KAN	CLT	MAR	ATL; DNQ	PHO	CAR	HOM	NA	-	

==== Busch Series ====
NASCAR Busch Series results
Year	Team	No.	Make	1	2	3	4	5	6	7	8	9	10	11	12	13	14	15	16	17	18	19	20	21	22	23	24	25	26	NBSC	Pts	Ref
1995		0	Chevy	DAY	CAR	RCH	ATL	NSV	DAR	BRI	HCY	NHA	NZH	CLT	DOV	MYB	GLN	MLW	TAL	SBO	IRP	MCH	BRI	DAR	RCH	DOV	CLT	CAR	HOM; DNQ	NA	-	

==== Craftsman Truck Series ====
NASCAR Craftsman Truck Series results
Year	Team	No.	Make	1	2	3	4	5	6	7	8	9	10	11	12	13	14	15	16	17	18	19	20	21	22	23	24	25	26	27	NCTC	Pts	Ref
1998	MB Motorsports	26	Ford	WDW; DNQ	HOM	PHO	POR	EVG	I70	GLN	TEX	BRI	MLW	NZH	CAL	PPR	IRP	NHA	FLM	NSV	HPT	LVL	RCH	MEM	GTY	MAR	SON	MMR	PHO	LVS	NA	-	
2001	Spears Motorsports	75	Chevy	DAY; 26	HOM; 24	MMR; 9	MAR; 16	GTY; 10	DAR; 9	PPR; 25	DOV; 25	TEX; 22	MEM; 11	MLW; 7	KAN; 5	KEN; 10	NHA; 15	IRP; 29	NSH; 23	CIC; 32	NZH; 7	RCH; 10	SBO; 15	TEX; 18	LVS; 16	PHO; 32	CAL; 11				13th	2718	

=== ARCA Re/Max Series ===
(key) (Bold – Pole position awarded by qualifying time. Italics – Pole position earned by points standings or practice time. * – Most laps led.)

ARCA Re/Max Series results
Year	Team	No.	Make	1	2	3	4	5	6	7	8	9	10	11	12	13	14	15	16	17	18	19	20	21	22	23	24	25	ARMC	Pts	Ref
1992		81	Olds	DAY; 20	FIF	TWS	TAL; 30	TOL	KIL	POC	MCH	FRS	KIL	NSH	DEL	POC	HPT	FRS	ISF	TOL	DSF	TWS; DNQ	SLM						61st	-	
1992		81	Chevy																					ATL; 32					61st	-	
1993				DAY; DNQ	FIF	TWS	TAL	KIL	CMS	FRS	TOL	POC	MCH	FRS	POC	KIL	ISF	DSF	TOL	SLM	WIN	ATL							NA	-	
1994		81	Chevy	DAY; DNQ	TAL	FIF	LVL	KIL	TOL	FRS	MCH	DMS	POC	POC	KIL	FRS	IND	I70	ISF	DSF	TOL	SLM	WIN	ATL					NA	-	
2001	Spears Motorsports	79	Chevy	DAY	NSH	WIN	SLM	GTY	KEN	CLT	KAN	MCH	POC	MEM; 1*	GLN	KEN; 7	MCH	POC	NSH	ISF	CHI	DSF	SLM	TOL	BLN	CLT	TAL	ATL	78th	440	
