= RFK Racing =

NASCAR racing team

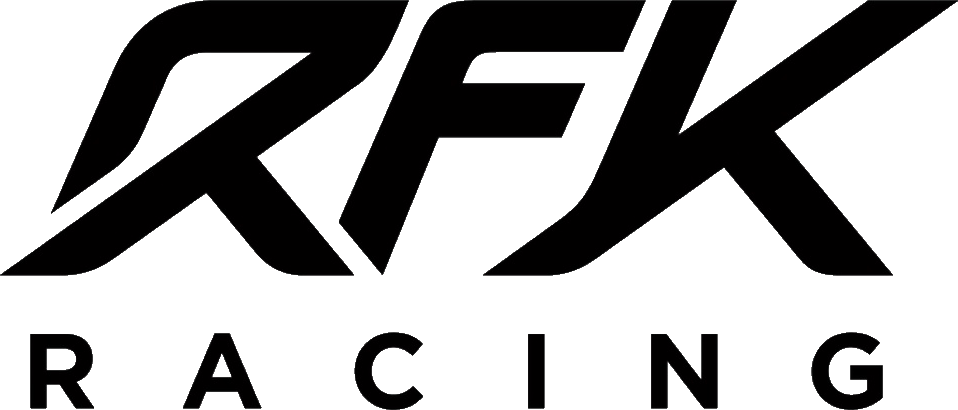
- Owner: Jack Roush|John W. Henry (Fenway Sports Group)|
- Principal: Chip Bowers
- Base: Concord, North Carolina
- Series: NASCAR Cup Series
- Race drivers: 6. Ryan Preece; 17. Chris Buescher; 60. T.B.A
- Manufacturer: Ford
- Opened: 1988
- Website: rfkracing.com

Career
- Debut: Cup Series: 1988 Daytona 500 (Daytona); O’Reilly Auto Parts Series: 1992 Goody's 300 (Daytona); Craftsman Truck Series: 1995 Heartland Tailgate 175 (Topeka); ARCA Menards Series: 2005 Advance Discount Auto Parts 200 (Daytona)
- Latest race: Cup Series: 2026 Season Finale 400 (Homestead); O'Reilly Auto Parts Series: 2018 Ford EcoBoost 300 (Homestead); Craftsman Truck Series: 2009 Ford 200 (Homestead); ARCA Menards Series: 2008 Hantz Group 200 (Toledo)
- Races competed: Total: 2,443; Cup Series: 1,334; O’Reilly Auto Parts Series: 726; Craftsman Truck Series: 353; ARCA Menards Series: 30
- Drivers' Championships: Total: 8 Cup Series: 2; 2003, 2004; O'Reilly Auto Parts Series: 5; 2002, 2007, 2011, 2012, 2015; Craftsman Truck Series: 1; 2000; ARCA Menards Series: 0
- Race victories: Total: 335; Cup Series: 144; O’Reilly Auto Parts Series: 138; Craftsman Truck Series: 50; ARCA Menards Series: 4
- Pole positions: Total: 236; Cup Series: 92; O'Reilly Auto Parts Series: 96; Craftsman Truck Series: 45; ARCA Menards Series: 3

Roush Fenway Keselowski Racing, doing business as RFK Racing, is an American professional stock car organization that currently competes in the NASCAR Cup Series. One of NASCAR's largest racing teams in the 2000s and early 2010s, Roush formerly ran teams in the NASCAR O'Reilly Auto Parts Series, NASCAR Craftsman Truck Series, ARCA Menards Series, Trans-Am Series and IMSA Camel GT. The team currently fields the No. 6 Ford Mustang Dark Horse full-time for Ryan Preece, the No. 17 Mustang full-time for Chris Buescher, and the No. 60 full-time with the driver to be announced.

The team was originally Roush Racing and was renamed Roush Fenway Racing in 2007 when John W. Henry and the Fenway Sports Group became co-owners and RFK Racing in 2022 when Brad Keselowski became a co-owner.

Since its inception, Roush has competed exclusively in Ford brand automobiles. The team also operates Roush-Yates Engines, which provides engines for most Ford teams in NASCAR and ARCA.

== History ==
Roush Racing was founded by Jack Roush, former employee of the Ford Motor Company and founder of Roush Performance. Prior to entering NASCAR competition, Roush had competed and won championships in various drag racing and sports car racing series since the mid-1960s, including the NHRA, SCCA Trans-Am Series, IMSA GT Championship, and the 24 Hours of Daytona. The racing business was originally a small branch of co-owner Jack Roush's successful automotive engineering and road-racing equipment business based in Livonia, Michigan. Early Roush drivers included Tommy Kendall, Scott Pruett and Willy T. Ribbs.

The NASCAR operation, founded in 1988 and based in Concord, North Carolina, has since become the cornerstone and centerpiece of the company. The team won back to back Championships in the NASCAR Cup Series in 2003 and 2004; the final Winston Cup championship with driver Matt Kenseth, and the first Nextel Cup championship with driver Kurt Busch. The team also has amassed many wins and championships in the Nationwide/Xfinity Series and Craftsman Truck Series competition.

In 2007, sports investor John W. Henry, owner of the Fenway Sports Group which operates the Boston Red Sox, Liverpool F.C., and the New England Sports Network bought a 50% stake in the team, renamed Roush Fenway Racing. Jack Roush continues to head day-to-day operations of the team.

Roush restarted its road racing program in 2006, called Roush Road Racing (previously Roush Performance Racing or Roush Performance). The team fielded the No. 61 Ford Mustang in the IMSA Continental Tire Sports Car Challenge and Rolex Sports Car Series for Billy Johnson and Jack Roush's son, Jack Roush Jr., and since 2014 fields the No. 60 Mustang in the Pirelli World Challenge sponsored by Roush Performance and driven by Roush Jr. Since 2015, the team has been fielded in a partnership with Capaldi Racing, moving from the Roush Fenway shops in North Carolina to Michigan near Roush Performance headquarters.

After several months of speculation, Roush-Fenway announced on July 20, 2021, at the NASCAR Hall of Fame that the 2010 Nationwide Series and 2012 Sprint Cup Series Champion Brad Keselowski would depart from Team Penske after the 2021 season to join the organization as a driver (replacing Ryan Newman in the No. 6) and co-owner. On September 29, 2026, Keselowski announced he would leave RFK Racing as a co-owner and driver.

== Cup Series ==
Logo of Roush Racing used from 1999 to 2006

Founded in 1988, the NASCAR program is built around having multiple cars and providing engine, engineering, and race car build services to other NASCAR teams fielding Ford-branded vehicles. The multi-team aspect of the company allows for information and resources to be shared across the enterprise, improving the performance of all of the teams. Since the 2004 season, engines for the cars have been provided by Roush-Yates Engines, a partnership between Roush Fenway Racing and now-closed rival Yates Racing, with Doug Yates as a head engine builder. Roush-Yates also provides engines, cars and parts to other Cup teams, including Wood Brothers Racing, Team Penske, and Front Row Motorsports.

Between 1998 and 2000 and 2003–2009, Roush Racing operated five full-time Cup teams (6, 16, 17, 26/97, 99), more than any other organization including Hendrick Motorsports and Richard Childress Racing, which have both operated as many as four full-time teams. Beginning in 2001, after years of operating in separate facilities, the teams were moved into a single shop in Concord, North Carolina to improve performance and communication. Roush Racing set a NASCAR record by putting all five of its race teams in the Chase for the Nextel Cup in 2005. Following the 2009 season, Roush Fenway was ordered by NASCAR to shrink its operation to four Sprint Cup Series teams, ceding the No. 26 team. The team would later shrink to three teams after the 2011 season, and would shrink again to two teams after the 2016 season. For 2025, RFK went back to a 3-car operation for the first time since 2016.

On November 29, 2023, it was announced that the number 60 would be brought up from the O'Reilly Auto Parts Series, to enter the 2024 Daytona 500 with David Ragan. The team raced under the banner of Stage 60. It also competed on a part-time schedule with different drivers. In 2025, RFK expanded the 60 team into a full time operation with driver Ryan Preece, and Kroger was the main sponsor.

== O'Reilly Auto Parts Series ==
The O'Reilly Auto Parts Series operation began in 1992 with the No. 60 driven by Mark Martin. The No. 60 team has been dominant throughout its history, amassing many wins with Martin; three driver's championships with Greg Biffle in 2002, Carl Edwards in 2007, and Chris Buescher in 2015; and an owner's championship with Edwards in 2011. The No. 6 team won back-to-back driver's championships in 2011 and 2012 with Ricky Stenhouse Jr. Following the departures of Ryan Reed, Chase Briscoe, and Austin Cindric, Roush's O'Reilly Auto Parts program was closed following the 2018 season.

Between 2008 and 2010 RFK set a record with 79 consecutive Top 10 Finishes from a driver. A feet that was broken by Jr Motorsports that was broken in August 2026.

== Craftsman Truck Series ==
From 1995 until 2009 Roush fielded teams in the NASCAR Truck Series, fielding trucks for drivers such as Kurt Busch, Greg Biffle, Kyle Busch, Carl Edwards, Ricky Craven, David Ragan, Mark Martin, Travis Kvapil, and various others. Many of these drivers went on to drive for the team at the Cup level. Roush's trucks won fifty races and the 2000 series championship (Biffle).

=== Truck No. 09 history ===
Joey Clanton began the 2008 season driving the No. 09 full-time in 2008, but after the season-opening race, he was released. Travis Kvapil returned to Roush and shared this ride with Bobby East and John Wes Townley for the rest of the season. Jamie McMurray piloted the truck at the fall Martinsville race. Kvapil managed two top-five finishes at Dover and New Hampshire during the season. Roush shut down the No. 09 team after the 2008 season.

==== Truck No. 09 results ====
Year	Driver	No.	Make	1	2	3	4	5	6	7	8	9	10	11	12	13	14	15	16	17	18	19	20	21	22	23	24	25	Owners	Pts
2008	Joey Clanton	09	Ford	DAY; 32																									—	2845
2008	Travis Kvapil	09	Ford		CAL; 7	ATL; 18	MAR; 7		CLT; 18		DOV; 4										NHA; 3				ATL; 11	TEX; 7		HOM; 6	—	2845
2008	Bobby East	09	Ford					KAN; 24				TEX; 8	MCH; 18		MEM; 8		IRP; 19			GTW; 25		LVS; 25							—	2845
2008	John Wes Townley	09	Ford							MFD; 27				MLW; 18		KEN; 21		NSH; 30	BRI; 35				TAL; 18				PHO; 24		—	2845
2008	Jamie McMurray	09	Ford																					MAR; 18					—	2845

=== Truck No. 6 history ===
==== Multiple drivers (2006) ====
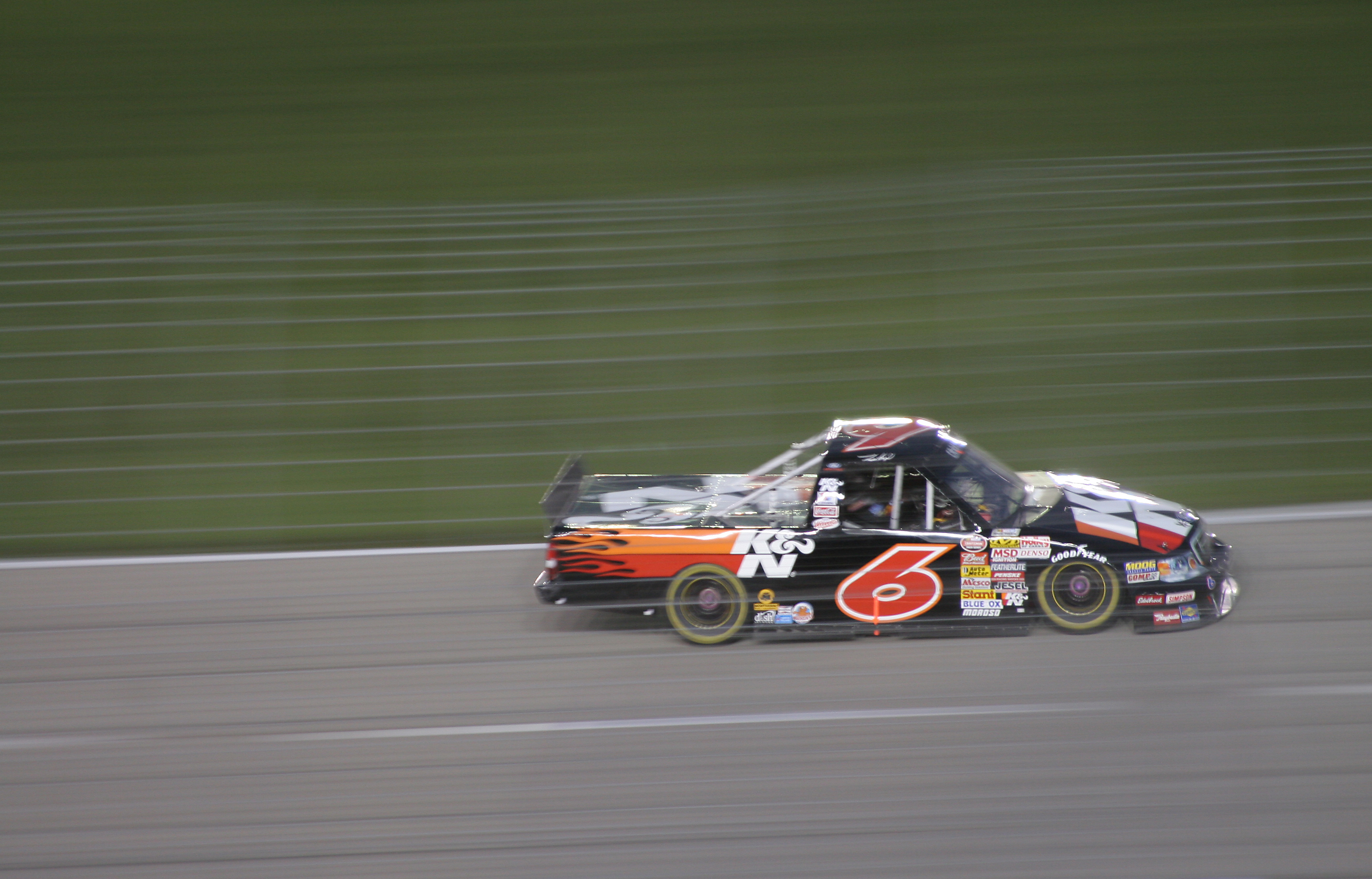
Travis Kvapil in 2007

The truck switched to No. 6 and was shared by Nextel Cup veteran Mark Martin and rookie David Ragan. The No. 6 truck's was piloted by Martin, won the first two races of the 2006 season. Martin then decided to race more races than he originally intended, and he only skipped races without a corresponding Nextel Cup event. Auggie Vidovich II drove for the Mansfield race after Ragan crashed the truck in practice, finishing nineteenth. Ragan shared the truck with Martin for the balance of the season and had six top-tens and one pole in the 6 truck. Martin had the most success in the truck, winning five races. Overall, the team finished second in the owner's points.

==== Travis Kvapil (2007) ====
In 2007, Mark Martin moved on to a new role with another team. In his place, Roush-Fenway hired 2003 NCTS Champion Travis Kvapil. Kvapil, after two years of struggling to launch his Cup Series career, returned to the Truck Series in 2007. During the season, Kvapil almost won the opening race at Daytona, and won four races en route to a sixth-place finish in points.

==== Colin Braun (2008–2009) ====
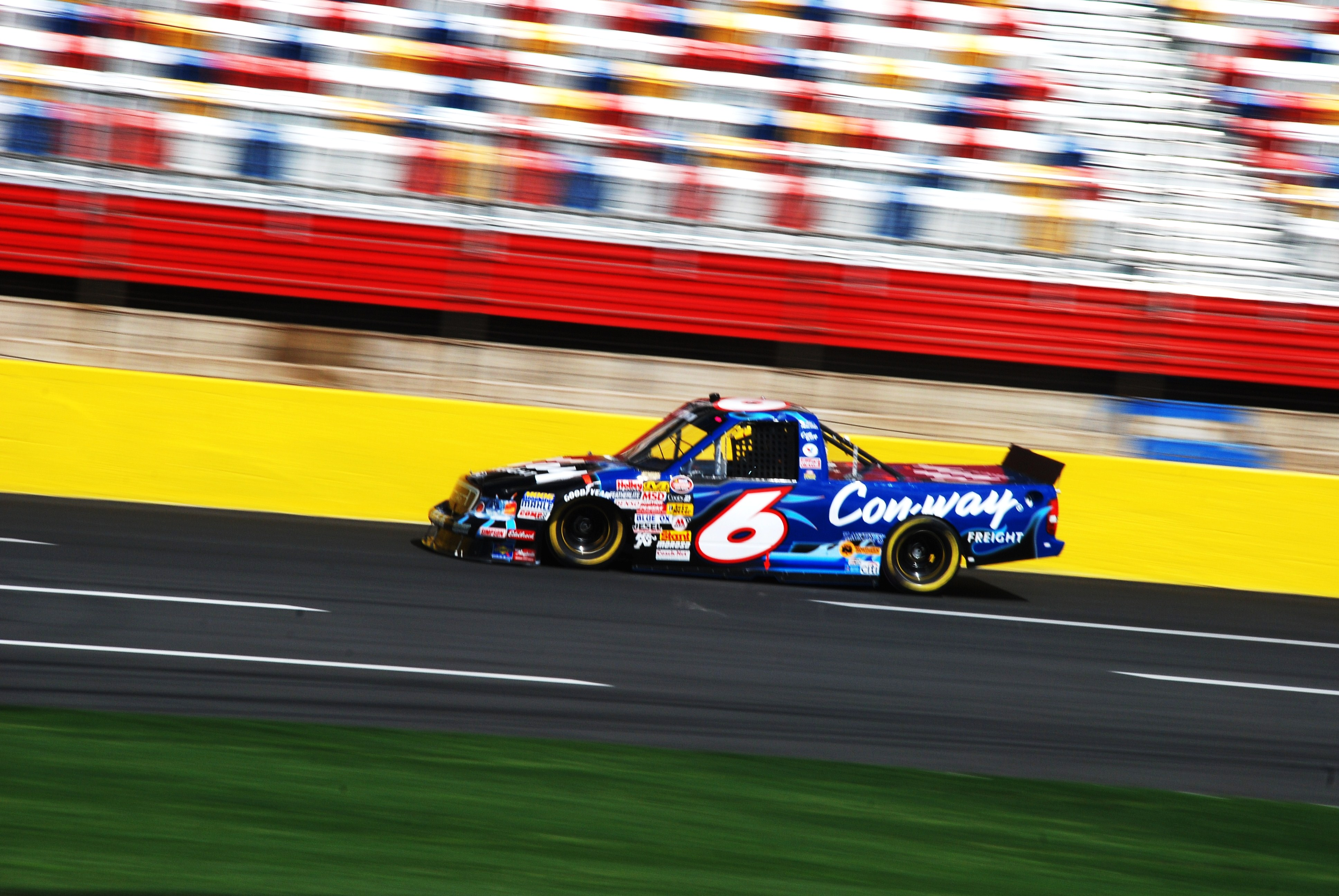
Colin Braun in 2008

As Kvapil heads back to the Sprint Cup Series with Yates Racing, former Rolex Sports Car Series driver Colin Braun took Kvapil's place in the No. 6 truck. In his rookie season, Braun had three top-fives and finished thirteenth in points, winning Rookie of the Year. In 2009, he won at Michigan and finished 5th in points. With moving Braun to the Nationwide Series for the 2010 season, Roush shut down this team and ended its Truck Series program. He later sold the remaining trucks to Cup Series driver Kyle Busch for him to start his own truck team.

==== Truck No. 6 results ====
Year	Driver	No.	Make	1	2	3	4	5	6	7	8	9	10	11	12	13	14	15	16	17	18	19	20	21	22	23	24	25	Owners	Pts
2006	Mark Martin	6	Ford	DAY; 1*	CAL; 1*	ATL; 2*	MAR; 4		CLT; 13		DOV; 1*		MCH; 2*							BRI; 1*	NHA; 10		TAL; 1*	MAR; 4	ATL; 36		PHO; 2*	HOM; 1*	—	—
2006	David Ragan	6	Ford					GTY; 28				TEX; 8		MLW; 30	KAN; 6	KEN; 5	MEM; 6	IRP; 9	NSH; 34							TEX; 6			—	—
2006	Auggie Vidovich	6	Ford							MFD; 19																			—	—
2006	Peter Shepherd	6	Ford																			LVS; 18							—	—
2007	Travis Kvapil	6	Ford	DAY; 3	CAL; 16	ATL; 15	MAR; 14	KAN; 13	CLT; 13	MFD; 7	DOV; 3	TEX; 6	MCH; 1	MLW; 8	MEM; 1*	KEN; 2	IRP; 3	NSH; 1	BRI; 11*	GTW; 6	NHA; 15	LVS; 1	TAL; 26	MAR; 13	ATL; 11	TEX; 26	PHO; 23	HOM; 21	6th	3511
2008	Colin Braun	6	Ford	DAY; 31	CAL; 9	ATL; 28	MAR; 14	KAN; 3	CLT; 15	MFD; 16	DOV; 8	TEX; 22	MCH; 6	MLW; 31	MEM; 29	KEN; 16	IRP; 15	NSH; 6	BRI; 32	GTW; 9	NHA; 28	LVS; 12	TAL; 4	MAR; 25	ATL; 20	TEX; 5	PHO; 28	HOM; 14	13th	2856
2009	Colin Braun	6	Ford	DAY; 9	CAL; 20	ATL; 26	MAR; 35	KAN; 6	CLT; 26	DOV; 22	TEX; 3	MCH; 1	MLW; 8	MEM; 9	KEN; 20	IRP; 5	NSH; 3	BRI; 12	CHI; 3	IOW; 3	GTW; 19	NHA; 9	LVS; 17	MAR; 3	TAL; 12	TEX; 5	PHO; 28	HOM; 3	5th	3338

=== Truck No. 33 history ===
The No. 33 truck began running in 2005 as a research and development entry for Ford. Bobby East attempted three races in the truck but failed to qualify for two of them. He crashed out of his only start at Phoenix, finishing 30th. Mark Martin ran the Ford 200, where he started fourteenth and finished eighth.

==== Truck No. 33 results ====
Year	Driver	No.	Make	1	2	3	4	5	6	7	8	9	10	11	12	13	14	15	16	17	18	19	20	21	22	23	24	25	Owners	Pts
2005	Bobby East	33	Ford	DAY	CAL	ATL	MAR	GTY	MFD	CLT	DOV	TEX	MCH	MLW	KAN	KEN	MEM	IRP; DNQ	NSH	BRI	RCH; DNQ	NHA	LVS	MAR	ATL	TEX	PHO; 30		—	—
2005	Mark Martin	33	Ford																									HOM; 8	—	—

=== Truck No. 49 history ===
Chuck Hossfeld drove the final race of 2000 at California Speedway in the No. 49 as a third Roush entry in preparation to take over the No. 50 from Greg Biffle in the 2001 season. He finished 31st after losing an engine during the event.

==== Truck No. 49 results ====
Year	Driver	No.	Make	1	2	3	4	5	6	7	8	9	10	11	12	13	14	15	16	17	18	19	20	21	22	23	24	Owners	Pts
2000	Chuck Hossfeld	49	Ford	DAY	HOM	PHO	MMR	MAR	PIR	GTY	MEM	PPR	EVG	TEX	KEN	GLN	MLW	NHA	NZH	MCH	IRP	NSV	CIC	RCH	DOV	TEX	CAL; 31	106th	70

=== Truck No. 50 history ===
==== Greg Biffle (1998–2000) ====
For the first race in 1998 at Walt Disney World Speedway, Ruttman piloted the No. 50, rookie Greg Biffle drove the No. 80, and Chuck Bown ran the No. 99. After Bown departed the team, Ruttman took over the No. 99, and Biffle moved from the No. 80, which was discontinued, to the No. 50. Biffle had been hired by Roush under the recommendation of Benny Parsons. Although he failed to win a race, Biffle won four poles and finished eighth in points.

Biffle would go on a tear in 1999 when he won nine times and was in contention for the championship for much of the season before finally losing to Jack Sprague. His 2000 season was less dominant with only five wins, but he was able to win the championship by 230 points over teammate Kurt Busch.

==== Chuck Hossfeld (2001) ====
With Biffle moving up to the Busch Series, in 2001, Roush hired Winston Modified Tour driver Chuck Hossfeld to drive the truck after he won 2000 Roush "Gong Show" competition. Hossfeld struggled in his rookie year, and soon he was released, with Jon Wood driving the truck for the remainder of the season.

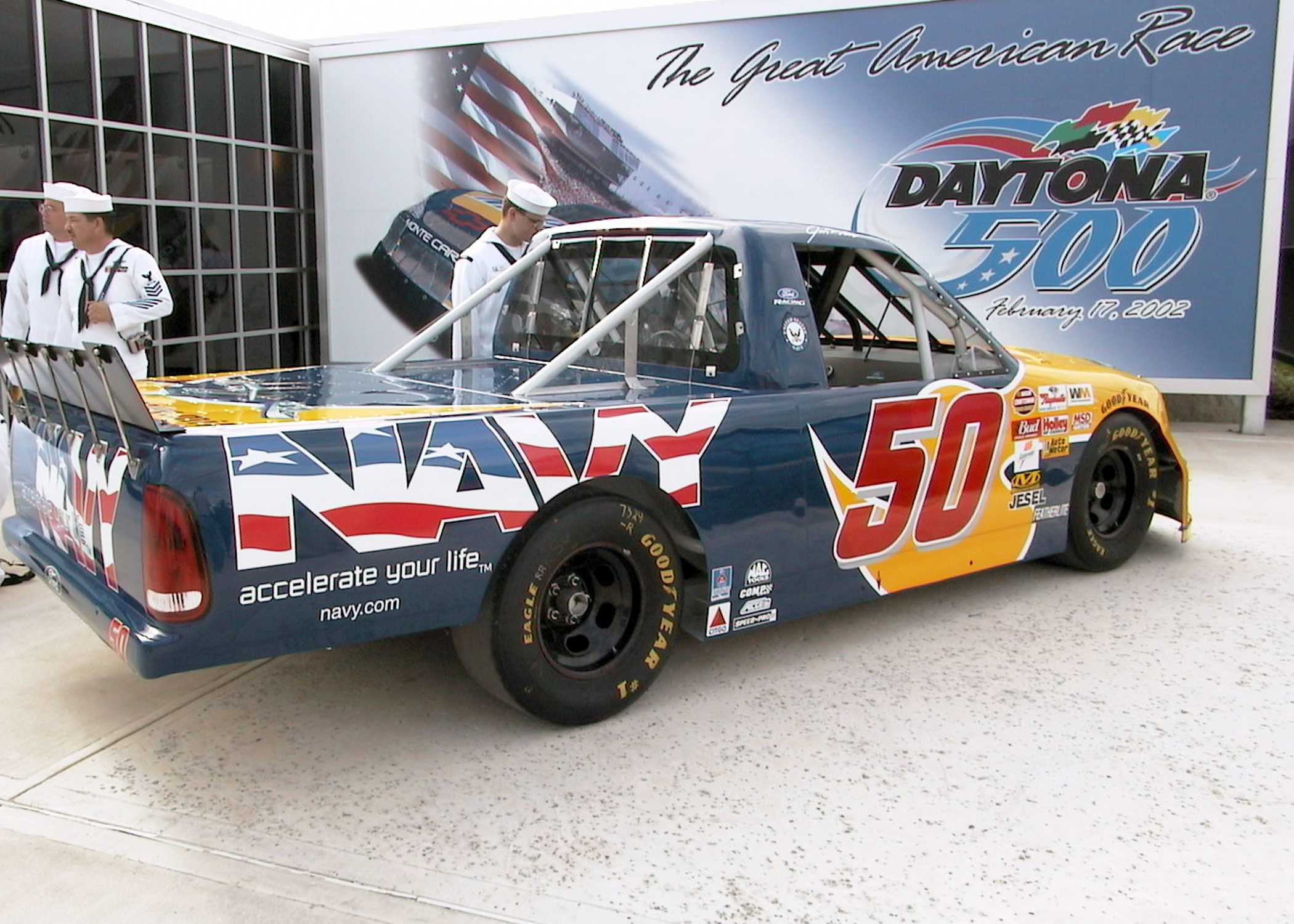
Jon Wood's No. 50 truck in 2002

==== Jon Wood (2001–2004) ====
Wood's audition was impressive enough to earn him a full-time run in 2002, and he posted twelve top-ten finishes and finished twelfth in points in his first full year. Wood had two wins the next year and finished 15th in points in 2004 before moving on to JTG Racing in the Busch Series.

==== Todd Kluever (2005) ====
In 2005, Todd Kluever, another "Gong Show" winner, piloted the truck. Kluever earned six top five and twelve top ten finishes in his rookie season, winning the Rookie of the Year award.

==== Multiple drivers (2006–2007) ====
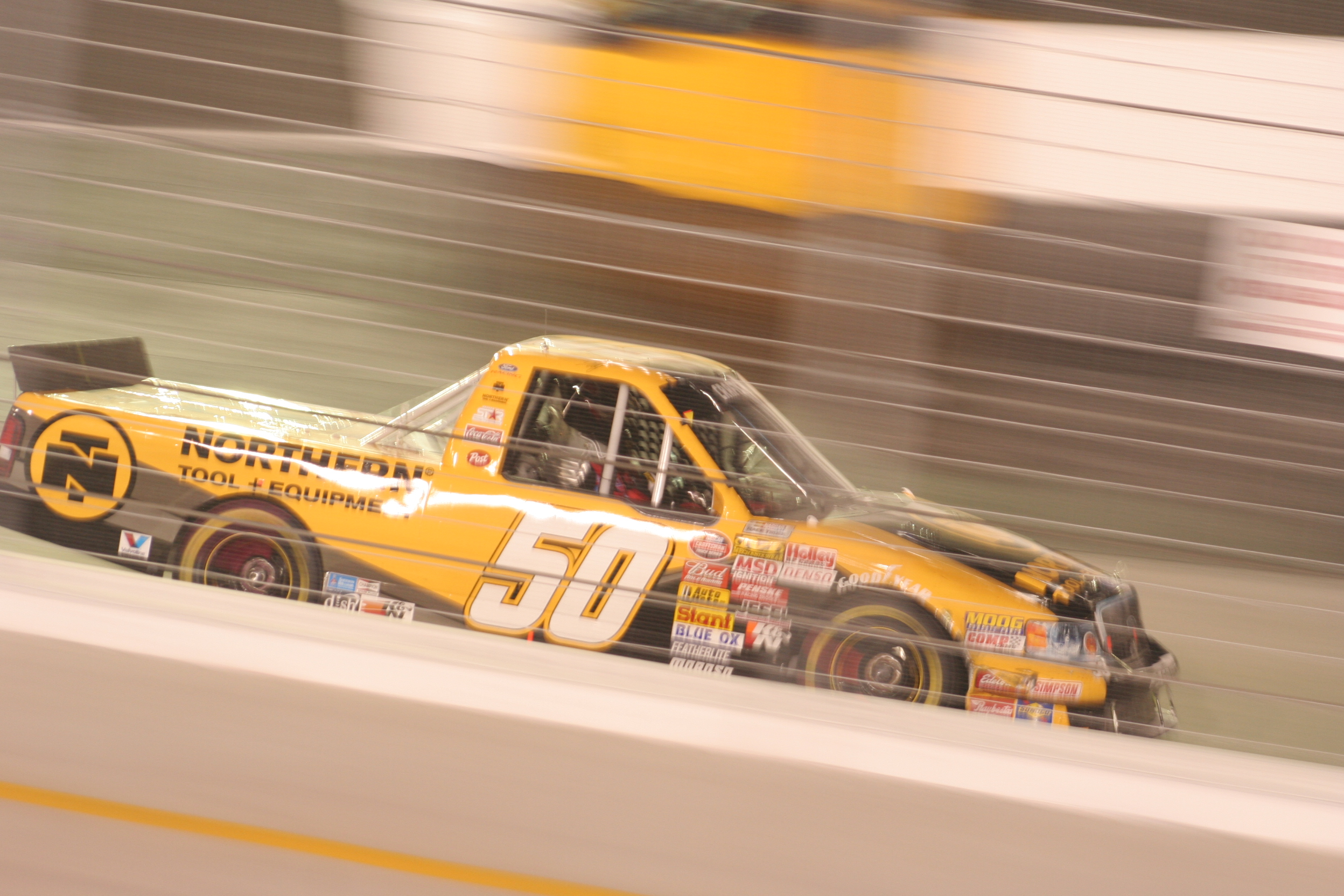
The 50 truck in 2007 driven by Danny O’Quinn Jr.

After Martin's strong start to the 2006 season, his original limited schedule in the No. 6 was expanded. Roush decided to run another part-time team for rookie David Ragan to fill out his original schedule. Ragan took the No. 50 to a 22nd-place finish at Atlanta, but struggled in his next few starts in both the No. 50 and the No. 6. Carl Edwards ran the No. 50 at the Dover race, achieving the team's only top five of the season, and Ragan returned at the Michigan race. Ragan's best finish in the No. 50 came at Atlanta where he finished sixth. Peter Shepherd and Michel Jourdain Jr. also drove the No. 50 on a part-time basis during the season. Edwards drove the truck for the first two races of the 2007 season unsponsored, scoring the team's only top five of the season at California Speedway. It was then announced that T. J. Bell would drive the truck for sixteen races. Development drivers Peter Shepherd, Danny O'Quinn Jr., and Colin Braun also drove the No. 50 truck.

==== Truck No. 50 results ====
Year	Driver	No.	Make	1	2	3	4	5	6	7	8	9	10	11	12	13	14	15	16	17	18	19	20	21	22	23	24	25	26	27	Owners	Pts
1998	Joe Ruttman	50	Ford	WDW; 2																											8th	3872
1998	Greg Biffle	50	Ford		HOM; 4	PHO; 36	POR; 26	EVG; 17	I70; 21	GLN; 27	TEX; 22	BRI; 29	MLW; 5	NZH; 30	CAL; 7	PPR; 17	IRP; 7	NHA; 2	FLM; 24	NSV; 4	HPT; 21	LVL; 8	RCH; 3	MEM; 22	GTY; 19	MAR; 8	SON; 20	MMR; 14	PHO; 2	LVS; 5	8th	3872
1999	Greg Biffle	50	Ford	HOM; 11	PHO; 11	EVG; 10	MMR; 24	MAR; 5	MEM; 1	PPR; 14	I70; 10	BRI; 9	TEX; 3	PIR; 1	GLN; 4	MLW; 1*	NSV; 22	NZH; 1	MCH; 1*	NHA; 4	IRP; 1	GTY; 1	HPT; 8	RCH; 1	LVS; 1	LVL; 14	TEX; 2	CAL; 7			2nd	3739
2000	Greg Biffle	50	Ford	DAY; 11	HOM; 5*	PHO; 5	MMR; 12	MAR; 14	PIR; 13	GTY; 4	MEM; 2	PPR; 1*	EVG; 4	TEX; 1*	KEN; 1*	GLN; 1*	MLW; 3	NHA; 4	NZH; 3	MCH; 1*	IRP; 5	NSV; 14	CIC; 2*	RCH; 2	DOV; 2	TEX; 25	CAL; 5				1st	3826
2001	Chuck Hossfeld	50	Ford	DAY; 19	HOM; 20	MMR; 20	MAR; 18	GTY; 19	DAR; 24	PPR; 10	DOV; 23	TEX; 27																			—	—
2001	Jon Wood	50	Ford										MEM; 14	MLW; 12	KAN; 4	KEN; 7	NHA; 19	IRP; 27	NSH; 16	CIC; 12	NZH; 6	RCH; 13	SBO; 14	TEX; 24	LVS; 29	PHO; 14	CAL; 3				—	—
2002	Jon Wood	50	Ford	DAY; 21	DAR; 9	MAR; 10	GTY; 7	PPR; 12	DOV; 29	TEX; 9	MEM; 11	MLW; 9	KAN; 9	KEN; 13	NHA; 11	MCH; 10	IRP; 8	NSH; 8	RCH; 28	TEX; 12	SBO; 6	LVS; 18	CAL; 13	PHO; 11	HOM; 14						12th	2782
2003	Jon Wood	50	Ford	DAY; 8	DAR; 19	MMR; 2	MAR; 22	CLT; 22	DOV; 4	TEX; 3	MEM; 4	MLW; 10	KAN; 1*	KEN; 4	GTW; 11	MCH; 6	IRP; 5	NSH; 7	BRI; 8	RCH; 4	NHA; 9	CAL; 9	LVS; 19	SBO; 4	TEX; 6	MAR; 1	PHO; 7	HOM; 8			5th	3659
2004	Jon Wood	50	Ford	DAY; 7	ATL; 27	MAR; 4	MFD; 8	CLT; 17	DOV; 10	TEX; 13	MEM; 8	MLW; 11	KAN; 6	KEN; 12	GTW; 30	MCH; 30	IRP; 27	NSH; 18	BRI; 18	RCH; 14	NHA; 29	LVS; 12	CAL; 13	TEX; 26	MAR; 4	PHO; 26	DAR; 22	HOM; 36			15th	2835
2005	Todd Kluever	50	Ford	DAY; 32	CAL; 4	ATL; 36	MAR; 16	GTY; 32	MFD; 4	CLT; 20	DOV; 20	TEX; 25	MCH; 15	MLW; 9	KAN; 2	KEN; 12	MEM; 10	IRP; 2	NSH; 5	BRI; 13	RCH; 32	NHA; 28	LVS; 8	MAR; 2	ATL; 6	TEX; 10	PHO; 12	HOM; 7			11th	3074
2006	David Ragan	50	Ford	DAY	CAL	ATL; 22	MAR; 34	GTY	CLT; 25				MCH; 19							BRI; 15	NHA; 11		TAL; 7	MAR; 20	ATL; 6		PHO; 17				—	—
2006	Michel Jourdain Jr.	50	Ford							MFD; DNQ		TEX; 13		MLW; DNQ	KAN; 32	KEN; 26		IRP; 19				LVS; 30				TEX; 24		HOM; 31			—	—
2006	Carl Edwards	50	Ford								DOV; 2																				—	—
2006	Peter Shepherd	50	Ford														MEM; 23		NSH; 31												—	—
2007	Carl Edwards	50	Ford	DAY; 24	CAL; 4																										—	—
2007	T. J. Bell	50	Ford			ATL; 26	MAR; 23	KAN; 22	CLT; 9	MFD; 13	DOV; 30	TEX; 23	MCH; 20							GTW; 24	NHA; 16	LVS; 31	TAL; 31		ATL; 30	TEX; 17	PHO; 15	HOM; 17			—	—
2007	Peter Shepherd	50	Ford											MLW; 32	MEM; 15	KEN; 32	IRP; 21														—	—
2007	Danny O'Quinn Jr.	50	Ford															NSH; 17	BRI; 10												—	—
2007	Colin Braun	50	Ford																					MAR; 34							—	—

=== Truck No. 61 history ===
==== Todd Bodine and Ted Musgrave (1995) ====
The original truck in Roush's stable debuted in 1995 at the Heartland Park Topeka road course. It was No. 61 and driven to a fourth-place finish by Todd Bodine. Bodine had four more top ten runs before Ted Musgrave drove to a fourth-place finish at Phoenix.

==== Truck No. 61 results ====
Year	Driver	No.	Make	1	2	3	4	5	6	7	8	9	10	11	12	13	14	15	16	17	18	19	20	21	22	23	24	25	26	27	Owners	Pts
1995	Todd Bodine	61	Ford	PHO	TUS	SGS	MMR	POR	EVG	I70	LVL	BRI	MLW	CNS	HPT; 4	IRP	FLM	RCH; 6	MAR; 6	NWS; 7	SON	MMR; 8									32nd	748
1995	Ted Musgrave	61	Ford																				PHO; 4								32nd	748

=== Truck No. 80 history ===
==== Joe Ruttman (1996–1997) ====
In 1996, the car switched to No. 80, and Joe Ruttman was at the wheel, nailing down sixteen top-tens and finishing fourth in points. In 1997, Ruttman won five times and finished third in points.

==== Truck No. 80 results ====
Year	Driver	No.	Make	1	2	3	4	5	6	7	8	9	10	11	12	13	14	15	16	17	18	19	20	21	22	23	24	25	26	27	Owners	Pts
1996	Joe Ruttman	80	Ford	HOM; 19	PHO; 7	POR; 9	EVG; 8	TUS; 15	CNS; 6	HPT; 23	BRI; 6	NZH; 7	MLW; 17	LVL; 5	I70; 20	IRP; 22	FLM; 27	GLN; 6	NSV; 13	RCH; 4	NHA; 8	MAR; 6	NWS; 5	SON; 4	MMR; 3	PHO; 3	LVS; 3				4th	3275
1997	Joe Ruttman	80	Ford	WDW; 1	TUS; 28	HOM; 26	PHO; 2	POR; 13	EVG; 4	I70; 6	NHA; 9	TEX; 9	BRI; 5	NZH; 2	MLW; 9	LVL; 2	CNS; 12	HPT; 1	IRP; 4	FLM; 2	NSV; 19	GLN; 4	RCH; 12	MAR; 12	SON; 1	MMR; 19	CAL; 29	PHO; 1	LVS; 1		3rd	3736
1998	Greg Biffle	80	Ford	WDW; 5	HOM	PHO	POR	EVG	I70	GLN	TEX	BRI	MLW	NZH	CAL	PPR	IRP	NHA	FLM	NSV	HPT	LVL	RCH	MEM	GTY	MAR	SON	MMR	PHO	LVS		

=== Truck No. 99 history ===
==== Early years (1996–2002) ====
The No. 99 truck debuted at Heartland Park Topeka in 1996. It was driven to an eighth-place finish by Jeff Burton. Posting three top tens in four races that year, he shared the ride with Mark Martin, who won at North Wilkesboro Speedway. The next year, Chuck Bown was hired to drive full-time, posting thirteen top tens and finishing ninth in points. Bown drove the first race of the 1998 season at Walt Disney World Speedway, before Joe Ruttman moved over to the truck for the remainder of the year, winning once and finishing third in points. Mike Bliss was next to tackle the ride, scoring a win at Heartland Park Topeka but only finishing ninth in points. When Bliss left for an ill-fated rookie year in Winston Cup, Kurt Busch was named the new driver for 2000. Busch won four times and finished second to teammate Biffle in the championship, easily winning Rookie of the Year.

Both Busch and Exide exited after that season (Busch moving to the Cup Series), and rookie Nathan Haseleu took over. The truck was largely unsponsored at the beginning of the year, with Eldon becoming the sponsor after nine races. Despite posting four top ten finishes in twelve starts, Hasleau was waived mid-season, replaced initially by former Truck Series drivers Greg Biffle and Kurt Busch. Biffle scored two wins in the truck. Kurt's younger brother Kyle would also run six races in the second half of the season, earning two top tens at the age of sixteen. Kyle Busch was scheduled to race the truck full-time in 2002, but during the 2001 season finale at Fontana he was ejected from the race due to conflicts with track sponsor Marlboro. Afterwards, NASCAR announced all drivers in its top three series must be at least eighteen years of age. Tim Woods III would replace Busch in the race.

After Tim Fedewa ran the 2002 season-opener in the truck, and with the now seventeen-year-old Busch not able to compete, the team did not run for the rest of the year due to lack of sponsorship.

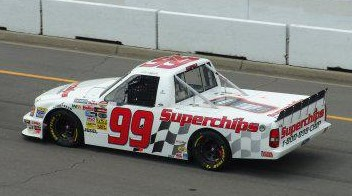
Carl Edwards in 2004

==== Carl Edwards (2003–2004) ====
The truck returned in 2003 with Carl Edwards driving; Edwards won three races and the Rookie of the Year title. He repeated his win total in 2004 and moved up to fourth in points, and following Jeff Burton's departure from Roush Racing he began splitting time between the Truck Series and the Nextel Cup Series.

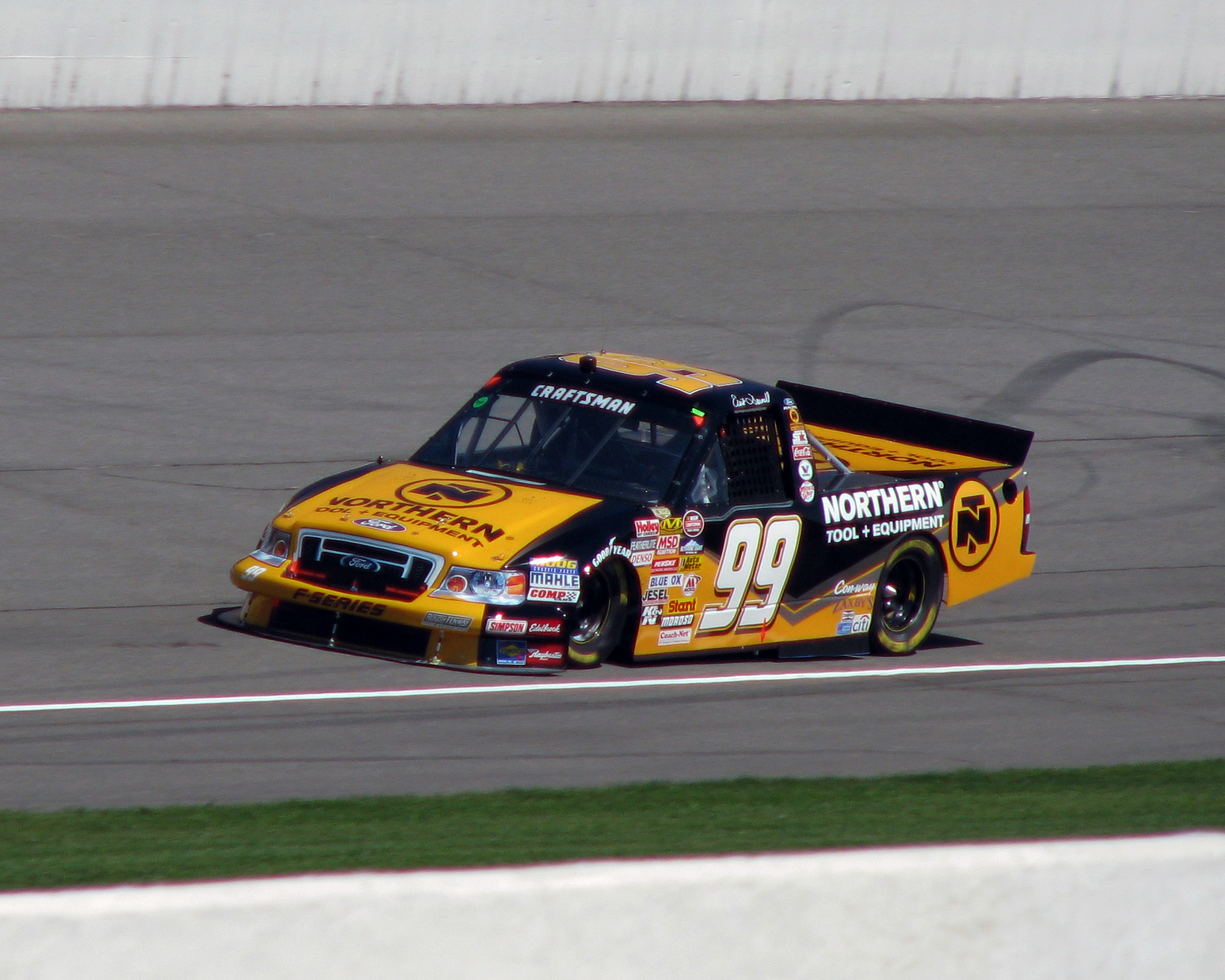
Erik Darnell in 2008

==== Ricky Craven (2005) ====
When Edwards moved up to Nextel Cup for 2005, Roush hired a former Cup driver, Ricky Craven, to take his place. Despite posting seven top tens and winning at Martinsville, Roush and Craven announced they would not be back together in 2006.

==== Erik Darnell (2006–2008) ====
Erik Darnell piloted the No. 99 truck full-time in 2006. 2007 brought about Darnell's first win at Kansas, but inconsistency left the team twelfth in points at season's end. In 2008, Darnell captured one win at Michigan by only .005 seconds over eventual champion Johnny Benson and ended the season fourth in the standings. This team was shut down after the 2008 season, as the team was being moved up for a part-time schedule in the Nationwide Series.

==== Truck No. 99 results ====
Year	Driver	No.	Make	1	2	3	4	5	6	7	8	9	10	11	12	13	14	15	16	17	18	19	20	21	22	23	24	25	26	27	Owners	Pts
1996	Jeff Burton	99	Ford	HOM	PHO	POR	EVG	TUS	CNS	HPT; 8	BRI	NZH; 4	MLW	LVL	I70	IRP; 14	FLM	GLN	NSV			MAR; 8									—	1125
1996	Mark Martin	99	Ford																	RCH; 3	NHA		NWS; 1	SON	MMR						—	1125
1996	Ted Musgrave	99	Ford																							PHO; 5	LVS; 36				—	1125
1997	Chuck Bown	99	Ford	WDW; 12	TUS; 9	HOM; 3	PHO; 8	POR; 27	EVG; 14	I70; 3	NHA; 10	TEX; 4	BRI; 9	NZH; 7	MLW; 10	LVL; 22	CNS; 26	HPT; 20	IRP; 12	FLM; 12	NSV; 7	GLN; 34	RCH; 8	MAR; 16	SON; 14	MMR; 14	CAL; 16	PHO; 2	LVS; 9		9th	3320
1998	Chuck Bown	99	Ford	WDW; 25*																											3rd	3874
1998	Joe Ruttman	99	Ford		HOM; 22	PHO; 7	POR; 9	EVG; 12	I70; 2	GLN; 1	TEX; 3	BRI; 3	MLW; 7	NZH; 5	CAL; 11	PPR; 3	IRP; 3	NHA; 3	FLM; 4	NSV; 24	HPT; 9	LVL; 27	RCH; 4	MEM; 4	GTY; 18	MAR; 21	SON; 4	MMR; 13	PHO; 4	LVS; 7	3rd	3874
1999	Mike Bliss	99	Ford	HOM; 28	PHO; 10	EVG; 8	MMR; 12	MAR; 6	MEM; 12	PPR; 15	I70; 9	BRI; 28	TEX; 6	PIR; 2	GLN; 19	MLW; 5	NSV; 15	NZH; 2	MCH; 22	NHA; 6	IRP; 5	GTY; 8	HPT; 1	RCH; 13	LVS; 30	LVL; 11	TEX; 26	CAL; 5			9th	3294
2000	Kurt Busch	99	Ford	DAY; 2	HOM; 9	PHO; 4	MMR; 2	MAR; 23	PIR; 11	GTY; 21	MEM; 13	PPR; 2	EVG; 5	TEX; 6	KEN; 29	GLN; 2	MLW; 1*	NHA; 1	NZH; 14	MCH; 2	IRP; 6	NSV; 12	CIC; 19	RCH; 3*	DOV; 1	TEX; 3	CAL; 1				2nd	3596
2001	Nathan Haseleu	99	Ford	DAY; 29	HOM; 14	MMR; 14	MAR; 10	GTY; 27	DAR; 10	PPR; 12	DOV; 21	TEX; 10			KAN; 10	KEN; 12	NHA; 13														—	2968
2001	Greg Biffle	99	Ford										MEM; 9						NSH; 7		NZH; 1					PHO; 1					—	2968
2001	Kurt Busch	99	Ford											MLW; 5																	—	2968
2001	Kyle Busch	99	Ford															IRP; 9		CIC; 17		RCH; 22	SBO; 33	TEX; 25	LVS; 9		CAL; QL^{†}				—	2968
2001	Tim Woods III	99	Ford																								CAL; 25				—	2968
2002	Tim Fedewa	99	Ford	DAY; 27	DAR	MAR	GTY	PPR	DOV	TEX	MEM	MLW	KAN	KEN	NHA	MCH	IRP	NSH	RCH	TEX	SBO	LVS	CAL	PHO	HOM						86th	82
2003	Carl Edwards	99	Ford	DAY; 24	DAR; 23	MMR; 15	MAR; 4	CLT; 12	DOV; 33	TEX; 2	MEM; 5	MLW; 15	KAN; 2	KEN; 1	GTW; 4	MCH; 5	IRP; 1*	NSH; 1*	BRI; 11	RCH; 25	NHA; 2	CAL; 7	LVS; 27	SBO; 7	TEX; 4	MAR; 2	PHO; 4	HOM; 27			8th	3416
2004	Carl Edwards	99	Ford	DAY; 1*	ATL; 7	MAR; 6	MFD; 17	CLT; 2*	DOV; 14	TEX; 6	MEM; 5	MLW; 23	KAN; 1	KEN; 33	GTW; 18	MCH; 6	IRP; 5	NSH; 20	BRI; 1	RCH; 5	NHA; 4	LVS; 33	CAL; 10	TEX; 9	MAR; 8	PHO; 10	DAR; 4	HOM; 12			4th	3493
2005	Ricky Craven	99	Ford	DAY; 4	CAL; 3	ATL; 18	MAR; 2	GTY; 10	MFD; 8	CLT; 10	DOV; 7	TEX; 13	MCH; 33	MLW; 21	KAN; 13	KEN; 13	MEM; 27	IRP; 25	NSH; 24	BRI; 32	RCH; 20	NHA; 11	LVS; 23	MAR; 1*	ATL; 9	TEX; 21	PHO; 32	HOM; 21			14th	2976
2006	Erik Darnell	99	Ford	DAY; 6	CAL; 11	ATL; 8	MAR; 11	GTY; 31	CLT; 10	MFD; 13	DOV; 25	TEX; 35	MCH; 12	MLW; 27	KAN; 26	KEN; 9	MEM; 2	IRP; 10	NSH; 12	BRI; 18	NHA; 9	LVS; 17	TAL; 19	MAR; 3	ATL; 3	TEX; 9	PHO; 10	HOM; 3			12th	3136
2007	Erik Darnell	99	Ford	DAY; 12	CAL; 13	ATL; 24	MAR; 18	KAN; 1*	CLT; 30	MFD; 15	DOV; 18	TEX; 32	MCH; 26	MLW; 6	MEM; 9	KEN; 29	IRP; 7	NSH; 9	BRI; 13	GTW; 7	NHA; 2	LVS; 5	TAL; 29	MAR; 25	ATL; 26	TEX; 14	PHO; 35	HOM; 24			12th	2875
2008	Erik Darnell	99	Ford	DAY; 21	CAL; 11	ATL; 12	MAR; 5	KAN; 28	CLT; 4	MFD; 11	DOV; 25	TEX; 24	MCH; 1	MLW; 4	MEM; 2	KEN; 29	IRP; 3	NSH; 2	BRI; 15	GTW; 6	NHA; 4	LVS; 2*	TAL; 12*	MAR; 19	ATL; 6	TEX; 18	PHO; 7	HOM; 11			4th	3412
^{†} – Busch was declared ineligible to compete at Fontana due to his age and sponsorship reasons and was replaced by Tim Woods III.

== ARCA Re/Max Series ==
=== Car No. 39 history ===
In 2006, Danny O'Quinn Jr. drove the No. 39 car at Daytona, finishing 37th after completing less than half the laps.

==== Car No. 39 results ====
Year	Driver	No.	Make	1	2	3	4	5	6	7	8	9	10	11	12	13	14	15	16	17	18	19	20	21	22	23	ARMC	Pts
2006	Danny O'Quinn Jr.	39	Ford	DAY; 37	NSH	SLM	WIN	KEN	TOL	POC	MCH	KAN	KEN	BLN	POC	GTW	NSH	MCH	ISF	MIL	TOL	DSF	CHI	SLM	TAL	IOW	—	1360

=== Car No. 60 history ===
Todd Kluever drove the No. 60 car in 2005 at Daytona, crashing out of the event.

==== Car No. 60 results ====
Year	Driver	No.	Make	1	2	3	4	5	6	7	8	9	10	11	12	13	14	15	16	17	18	19	20	21	22	23	ARMC	Pts
2005	Todd Kluever	60	Ford	DAY; 11	NSH	SLM	KEN	TOL	LAN	MIL	POC	MCH	KAN	KEN	BLN	POC	GTW	LER	NSH	MCH	ISF	TOL	DSF	CHI	SLM	TAL	111th	180

=== Car No. 99 history ===
In 2007, Erik Darnell drove the No. 99 in three races, finishing second at Kansas and winning at Kentucky and Michigan. Travis Kvapil drove one race at Pocono, failing to finish, and Colin Braun drove three races later in the year, collecting three top tens. For 2008, Ricky Stenhouse Jr. drove the No. 99 to compete in the championship, winning two races at Kentucky and Pocono and collecting ten top-fives. During the last race at Toledo Speedway, he and Scott Speed battled for the championship, and Stenhouse ran Speed up the track causing a caution. Speed later wrecked in retaliation, knocking Stenhouse and himself out of the race. Justin Allgaier won the championship, while Stenhouse and Speed slipped to fourth and fifth in the final standings.

==== Car No. 99 results ====
Year	Driver	No.	Make	1	2	3	4	5	6	7	8	9	10	11	12	13	14	15	16	17	18	19	20	21	22	23	ARMC	Pts
2007	Erik Darnell	99	Ford	DAY	USA	NSH	SLM	KAN; 2	WIN	KEN; 1*	TOL	IOW		MCH; 1*	BLN	KEN	POC	NSH	ISF	MIL								
2007	Travis Kvapil	99	Ford										POC; 33															
2007	Colin Braun	99	Ford																		GTW; 9	DSF	CHI; 3	SLM	TAL; 9	TOL		
2008	Ricky Stenhouse Jr.	99	Ford	DAY; 25	SLM; 6	IOW; 19	KAN; 2	CAR; 3	KEN; 1	TOL; 7	POC; 1*	MCH; 2	CAY; 3*	KEN; 13	BLN; 7	POC; 30	NSH; 7	ISF; 2	DSF; 5	CHI; 2*	SLM; 17	NJM; 2	TAL; 28	TOL; 25			4th	5155
2008	Colin Braun	99	Ford																			NJM; RL^{†}					4th	5155
^{†} – Relieved Ricky Stenhouse Jr. during race.

== Partnerships ==
=== Roush–Yates Engines ===
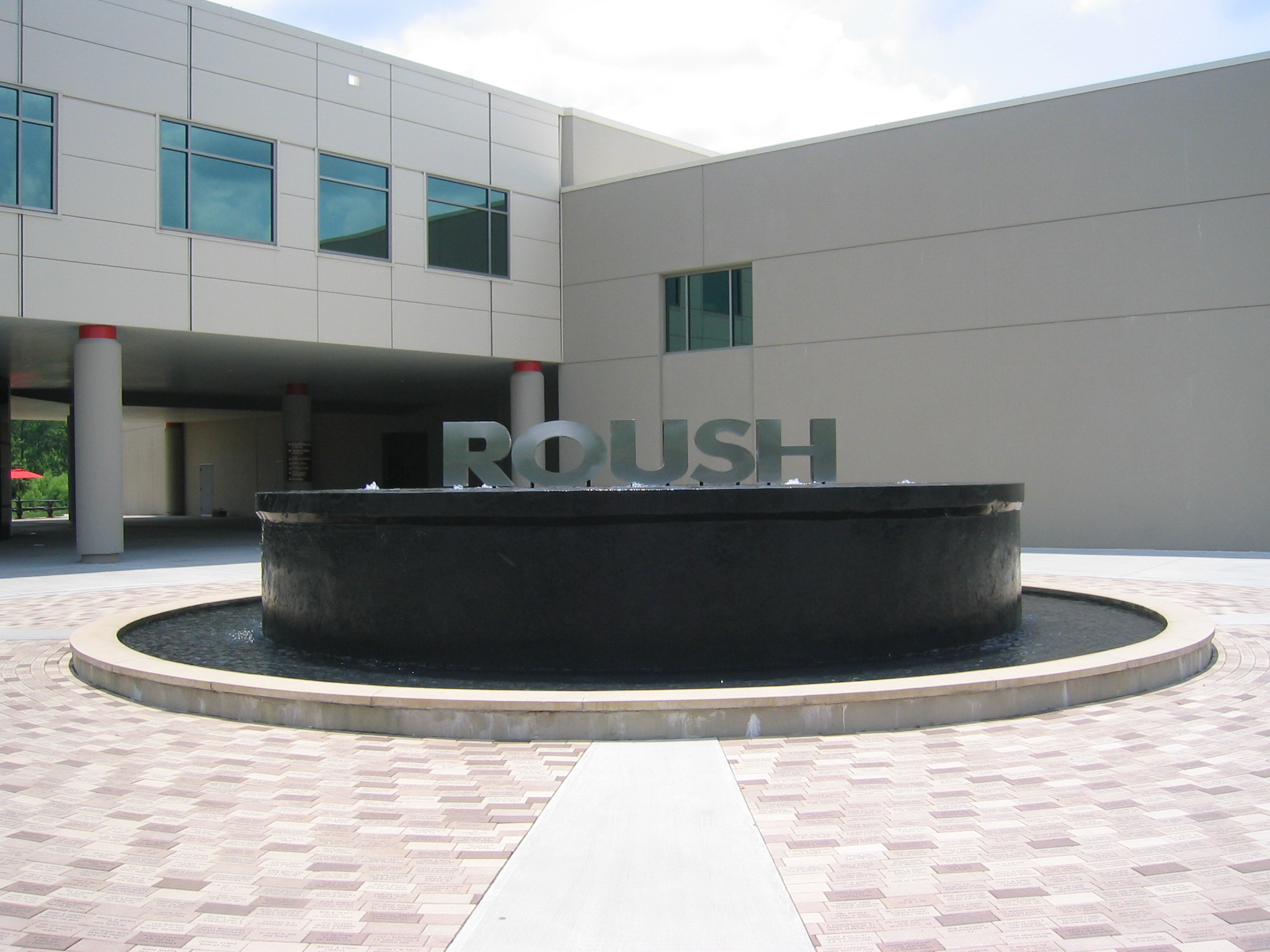
Outside Roush headquarters

Perhaps Roush Racing's most famous partnership is with the now defunct Yates Racing, a longtime rival Ford team. In 2004, the two teams announced a program to combine their engine divisions, now known as Roush–Yates Engines (RYE), a move which greatly improved the power of both organizations' engines. By 2006, most Ford teams were using the Roush–Yates engines, including long-time Ford team and Roush affiliate Wood Brothers Racing (then Wood Brothers/JTG Racing). Current Roush–Yates clients include Team Penske (TP), Wood Brothers Racing (WBR), and Front Row Motorsports (FRM).

Roush Fenway also has technical alliances with Front Row Motorsports, providing engines, chassis, and bodies as well as technical support. Roush also provided heavy technical support to Yates Racing from 2008 to the team's closure at the end of 2009, when it merged with Richard Petty Motorsports. As of 2017, Roush supplies engines and chassis to 13 Cup teams.

=== Wood Brothers Racing ===
The first technical alliance between Roush Racing and another organization was with Wood Brothers Racing, another longtime Ford team and the oldest active team in the sport. The Wood Brothers alliance began in mid-2000, after Roush had provided the team with engines the previous two seasons. The relationship later expanded when the team fielded Roush development driver Trevor Bayne from late-2010 to 2014. It would end after that season, with the Wood Brothers currently receiving equipment and support (other than engines) from Team Penske.

=== Tim Brown partnership ===
In 2005, nine-time Pro Bowl NFL wide receiver Tim Brown announced that he intended to start his own NASCAR team, most likely No. 81, and receive equipment from Roush Racing. Brown also stated that he will let Roush select his driver. The series the team will run will depend on how much sponsorship money the team gets.

Brown had said that his team will most likely not enter NASCAR until 2007, but as of October 2006, no further announcements have been made about the status of this partnership.

=== No Fear Racing ===
In 2006, SoBe No Fear energy drink announced that it was forming a new team to run full-time in 2007, with a car driven by road racing specialist Boris Said. It was also announced that this new team would be affiliated with Roush Racing. This allows Roush to sell No Fear Racing cars and equipment, as well as help them with engineering. In return, Said is tutoring Roush's younger drivers on road course racing. The team began running a limited schedule with the Sonoma road course in 2006.

=== Robby Gordon ===
Starting with the 2007 season, Robby Gordon switched from Chevrolet to Ford vehicles after signing a contract with Ford Racing. He leased engines from the Roush/Yates engine program through the 2007 season, until he switched to Gillett Evernham engines and a Dodge Charger.

=== Creation of Roush Fenway Racing ===
On February 14, 2007, the Fenway Sports Group, owner of the Boston Red Sox baseball team, purchased 50% of Roush Racing to create a new corporate entity, Roush Fenway Racing.

Mike Dee, president of the Fenway Sports Group was quoted as saying, "Although there have been many instances of cross-ownership in the world of professional sports, this partnership marks the first time that owners of a professional franchise in one of the four major leagues have crossed over into the world of NASCAR."

== Aerospace industry ==
Roush became involved in the aerospace industry in the 2010s. In April 2015, United Launch Alliance announced that they were contracting with Roush Racing to produce the lightweight internal combustion engine to be used to power the long-life on orbit system of the Advanced Cryogenic Evolved Stage to be flown in the 2020s as the second stage of the Vulcan launch vehicle.

== The Gong Show ==
For many years, Roush Racing recruited its developmental drivers through an elimination-style of testing entitled The Gong Show. The first competition was held in 1985 for Roush's road racing program. The first combine for the stock car program was held in 1999. The process would begin when Roush solicited applications from thousands of drivers from all levels of racing. They would then be put through a series of tests, gauging not only driving skills but also public relations talent and personality traits. Eventually, the field would be narrowed down to an elite group who are allowed to race Roush vehicles, often Truck Series vehicles, in an attempt to assess racecraft. Those with the fastest times progress, and ultimately the best drivers are awarded a contract to drive for Roush in the Truck Series or Busch Series (now Xfinity Series). In 2005, the process was documented in the Discovery Channel television series Roush Racing: Driver X, which followed the stories of those involved in the 2005 Gong Show. Winners of the program include Kurt Busch, Carl Edwards and David Ragan.

The term "Gong Show" comes from the 1970s talent show spoof The Gong Show.

== See also ==
- Roush Performance
- Ford Racing
- RFK Racing in the NASCAR Cup Series
- RFK Racing in the NASCAR Xfinity Series

== Sources ==
- NASCAR.com Driver list
- Racing-Reference.info
