= 1999 California 200 =

4th race of the 1999 NASCAR Winston West Series

Race details
- Race 4 of 14 in the 1999 NASCAR Winston West Series season
- Date: May 1, 1999
- Location: California Speedway in Fontana, California
- Course: Permanent racing facility
- Course length: 2.00 miles (3.218 km)
- Distance: 100 laps, 200.00 mi (321.869 km)
- Average speed: 113.583 miles per hour (182.794 km/h)

Pole position
| Driver | Austin Cameron | AC Motorsports |

Most laps led
| Driver | Ken Schrader | Andy Petree Racing |
- Laps: 43

Winner
| No. 58 | Ricky Craven | SBIII Motorsports |

The 1999 California 200 was the fourth stock car race of the 1999 NASCAR Winston West Series. The race was held on Saturday, May 1, 1999, at California Speedway, a 2-mile D-shaped oval shaped racetrack in Fontana, California. The race took the scheduled 100 laps to complete. The race was won by Ricky Craven, his first win of the season and first of his career, coming in his second career start. On the final restart, Craven took advantage of a battle between Mike Chase and Mike Wallace to grow the lead he had, and would defeat eventual second-place finisher Ken Schrader by 2.6 seconds. Rick Carelli climbed up to finish third, with Wallace falling to fourth and Chase to fifth. The race was the final attempt for long time driver St. James Davis; he failed to qualify.

== Report ==
=== Background ===
Auto Club Speedway (known as California Speedway before and after the 2008–2023 corporate sponsorship by the Automobile Club of Southern California) was a 2-mile (3.219 km), D-shaped oval superspeedway in unincorporated San Bernardino County, California, near Fontana. It hosted National Association for Stock Car Auto Racing (NASCAR) racing annually from 1997 until 2023. It was also previously used for open wheel racing events.

==== Entry list ====
| # | Driver | Owner | Manufacturer |
|---|---|---|---|
| 00 | Scott Gaylord | Geoff Burney | Chevrolet |
| 1 | Butch Gilliland | Richard Hilton | Ford |
| 2 | Craig Raudman | Dave Reed | Chevrolet |
| 3 | Steve Portenga | James Offenbach | Chevrolet |
| 04 | Kurt Busch | Charlene Spilsbury | Ford |
| 05 | John Metcalf | Randy Morse | Chevrolet |
| 6 | Wayne Jacks | Doc Faustina | Chevrolet |
| 7 | Gary Smith | Bernie Hilber | Pontiac |
| 10 | Tony Toste | Daniel Toste | Chevrolet |
| 12 | Austin Cameron | Terry Cameron | Chevrolet |
| 13 | Dean Kuhn | Dan Chittenden | Chevrolet |
| 14 | Jason Small | Ken Small | Chevrolet |
| 15 | Ken Schrader | Andy Petree | Chevrolet |
| 16 | Sean Woodside | Bill McAnally | Chevrolet |
| 18 | Mike Chase | Gene Christensen | Chevrolet |
| 19 | Billy Kann | Billy Kann | Chevrolet |
| 20 | Brendan Gaughan | Walker Evans | Chevrolet |
| 22 | St. James Davis | LaDonna Davis | Pontiac |
| 23 | Brandon Ash | Ed Ash | Ford |
| 26 | Mike Wallace | Jim Smith | Ford |
| 30 | Christian Elder | John Elder | Pontiac |
| 32 | Eric Norris | Matt Stowe | Ford |
| 33 | Darrel Krentz | Robert Wood | Ford |
| 35 | David Starr | Mike Starr | Chevrolet |
| 43 | Kenny Smith | Kenny Smith | Chevrolet |
| 44 | Bill Sedgwick | Tim Buckley | Chevrolet |
| 51 | Rick Ware | Rick Ware | Pontiac |
| 56 | Bobby Dotter | Sammy Potashnick | Ford |
| 57 | Rick Carelli | Marshall Chesrown | Chevrolet |
| 58 | Ricky Craven | Scott Barbour | Ford |
| 65 | Sammy Potashnick | Sammy Potashnick | Chevrolet |
| 66 | Billy Turner | Sheri Turner | Chevrolet |
| 67 | Mike Duncan | Mike Duncan | Ford |
| 71 | Jerry Cain | Jerry Cain | Chevrolet |
| 77 | Joe Bean | Joe Nava | Ford |
| 81 | Jerry Glanville | Jerry Glanville | Ford |
| 83 | Rick Bogart | Rick Bogart | Chevrolet |
| 85 | Kevin Richards | Gene Monaco | Chevrolet |
| 92 | Ross Thompson | Dan Selznick | Ford |
| 96 | Bobby Pangonis | Darcy Pangonis | Chevrolet |

== Qualifying ==
Qualifying was held on Thursday, April 29, where Austin Cameron won the pole with a record lap of 180.664 mph. Four drivers failed to qualify, those being Billy Kann, St. James Davis, Kenny Smith, and Bobby Pangonis.

== Race results ==
| Fin | St | # | Driver | Owner | Make | Laps | Led | Status | Pts |
|---|---|---|---|---|---|---|---|---|---|
| 1 | 5 | 58 | Ricky Craven | Scott Barbour | Ford | 100 | 41 | Running | 180 |
| 2 | 2 | 15 | Ken Schrader | Andy Petree | Chevrolet | 100 | 43 | Running | 180 |
| 3 | 4 | 57 | Rick Carelli | Marshall Chesrown | Chevrolet | 100 | 0 | Running | 165 |
| 4 | 9 | 26 | Mike Wallace | Jim Smith | Ford | 100 | 0 | Running | 160 |
| 5 | 3 | 18 | Mike Chase | Gene Christensen | Chevrolet | 100 | 0 | Running | 155 |
| 6 | 7 | 1 | Butch Gilliland | Richard Hilton | Ford | 100 | 0 | Running | 150 |
| 7 | 12 | 3 | Steve Portenga | James Offenbach | Chevrolet | 100 | 5 | Running | 151 |
| 8 | 23 | 77 | Joe Bean | Joe Nava | Ford | 100 | 0 | Running | 142 |
| 9 | 15 | 16 | Sean Woodside | Bill McAnally | Chevrolet | 100 | 0 | Running | 138 |
| 10 | 22 | 92 | Ross Thompson | Dan Selznick | Ford | 100 | 0 | Running | 134 |
| 11 | 21 | 23 | Brandon Ash | Ed Ash | Ford | 100 | 0 | Running | 130 |
| 12 | 16 | 32 | Eric Norris | Matt Stowe | Ford | 100 | 4 | Running | 132 |
| 13 | 20 | 56 | Bobby Dotter | Sammy Potashnick | Ford | 100 | 0 | Running | 124 |
| 14 | 36 | 2 | Craig Raudman | Dave Reed | Chevrolet | 100 | 0 | Running | 121 |
| 15 | 13 | 71 | Jerry Cain | Jerry Cain | Chevrolet | 100 | 0 | Running | 118 |
| 16 | 24 | 81 | Jerry Glanville | Jerry Glanville | Ford | 100 | 0 | Running | 115 |
| 17 | 25 | 67 | Mike Duncan | Mike Funcan | Ford | 99 | 4 | Running | 117 |
| 18 | 14 | 10 | Tony Toste | Daniel Toste | Chevrolet | 99 | 0 | Running | 109 |
| 19 | 33 | 6 | Wayne Jacks | Doc Faustina | Chevrolet | 99 | 0 | Running | 106 |
| 20 | 31 | 13 | Dean Kuhn | Dan Chittenden | Chevrolet | 97 | 0 | Running | 103 |
| 21 | 28 | 66 | Billy Turner | Sheri Turner | Chevrolet | 97 | 0 | Running | 100 |
| 22 | 27 | 65 | Sammy Potashnick | Sammy Potashnick | Chevrolet | 96 | 0 | Running | 97 |
| 23 | 10 | 85 | Kevin Richards | Gene Monaco | Chevrolet | 83 | 0 | Running | 94 |
| 24 | 29 | 44 | Bill Sedgwick | Tim Buckley | Chevrolet | 75 | 0 | Engine | 91 |
| 25 | 35 | 33 | Darrel Krentz | Robert Wood | Ford | 74 | 0 | Accident | 88 |
| 26 | 19 | 30 | Christian Elder | John Elder | Pontiac | 69 | 0 | Engine | 85 |
| 27 | 6 | 04 | Kurt Busch | Charlene Spilsbury | Ford | 61 | 0 | Engine | 82 |
| 28 | 17 | 05 | John Metcalf | Randy Morse | Chevrolet | 58 | 0 | Accident | 79 |
| 29 | 1 | 12 | Austin Cameron | Terry Cameron | Chevrolet | 58 | 3 | Accident | 81 |
| 30 | 26 | 83 | Rick Bogart | Rick Bogart | Chevrolet | 49 | 0 | Running | 73 |
| 31 | 30 | 20 | Brendan Gaughan | Walker Evans | Chevrolet | 47 | 0 | Accident | 70 |
| 32 | 34 | 7 | Gary Smith | Bernie Hilber | Pontiac | 47 | 0 | Accident | 67 |
| 33 | 18 | 14 | Jason Small | Ken Small | Chevrolet | 21 | 0 | Engine | 64 |
| 34 | 11 | 51 | Rick Ware | Rick Ware | Pontiac | 19 | 0 | Drivetrain | 61 |
| 35 | 8 | 35 | David Starr | Mike Starr | Chevrolet | 10 | 0 | Engine | 58 |
| 36 | 32 | 00 | Scott Gaylord | Geoff Burney | Chevrolet | 3 | 0 | Ignition | 55 |

== Standings after the race ==
| | Pos | Driver | Points |
|---|---|---|---|
| | 1 | Mike Chase | 625 |
| | 2 | Brandon Ash | 593 (–32) |
| 1 | 3 | Sean Woodside | 582 (–43) |
| 1 | 4 | Austin Cameron | 527 (–98) |
| 2 | 5 | Steve Portenga | 524 (–101) |
| | 6 | Joe Bean | 509 (–116) |
| 1 | 7 | Bobby Dotter | 499 (–126) |
| 3 | 8 | Sammy Potashnick | 482 (–143) |
| 4 | 9 | Butch Gilliland | 480 (–145) |
| 2 | 10 | Eric Norris | 474 (–151) |

| Previous race: 1999 NAPA Auto Parts 100 | NASCAR Winston West Series; 1999 season | Next race: 1999 King Soopers 150 |
