= Cory Kruseman =

- Born: September 20, 1970 (age 56); Ventura, California, U.S.
- Achievements: 2001 SCRA Champion; 2002 USAC Indiana Sprint Week Champion

NASCAR FedEx Freight Truck Series career
- 1 race run over 1 year
- Best finish: 96th (2002)
- First race: 2002 Chevy Silverado 150 (Phoenix)
Wins	Top tens	Poles
0	0	0

IndyCar Series career
- 1 race run over 1 year
- Best finish: 48th (2002)
- First race: 2002 Chevy 500 (Texas)
Wins	Podiums	Poles
0	0	0
- Statistics up to date as of September 10, 2012.

Cory Lee Kruseman (born September 20, 1970) is an American racing driver. A two-time Chili Bowl champion in midget car racing, he has also competed in the NASCAR Craftsman Truck Series and the Firestone Indy Racing League.

== Personal life ==
Born in Ventura, California, Kruseman was married, to Carri, and has one daughter. He currently operates the Cory Kruseman Sprint Car and Midget Driving School. He is a graduate of Buena High School.

== Racing career ==
Kruseman has raced for most of his career in midget and sprint cars, racing in United States Auto Club (USAC) and Sprint Car Racing Association (SCRA) competition. A serious accident in 1995 nearly ended Kruseman's career, but after six months of rehabilitation he returned to racing.

Kruseman won the famous Chili Bowl midget car race in 2000; in 2004, he was champion of the event for a second time. Kruseman was also the 2001 SCRA Champion, and the 2002 USAC Indiana Sprint Week Championship champion.

In 2002, Kruseman made one start each in the NASCAR Craftsman Truck Series at Phoenix International Raceway, where he finished 31st, and in the Firestone Indy Racing League at Texas Motor Speedway, finishing 26th. Kruseman also attempted to qualify for Craftsman Truck Series races at Homestead-Miami Speedway in 2002, and at Phoenix in 2003, but failed to qualify for either race.

A frequent visitor to Australia to race Midgets (known as Speedcars down under), Kruseman won the 2002/03 Australian Speedcar Championship at the Speedway City in Adelaide.

Kruseman was inducted into the National Sprint Car Hall of Fame in 2023.

== Motorsports career results ==
=== NASCAR ===
(key) (Bold – Pole position awarded by qualifying time. Italics – Pole position earned by points standings or practice time. * – Most laps led.)

==== Craftsman Truck Series ====
NASCAR Craftsman Truck Series results
Year	Team	No.	Make	1	2	3	4	5	6	7	8	9	10	11	12	13	14	15	16	17	18	19	20	21	22	23	24	25	NCTC	Pts	Ref
2002	SealMaster Racing	98	Chevy	DAY	DAR	MAR	GTY	PPR	DOV	TEX	MEM	MLW	KAN	KEN	NHA	MCH	IRP	NSH	RCH	TEX	SBO	LVS	CAL	PHO; 31	HOM; DNQ				96th	70	
2003	SealMaster Racing	98	Chevy	DAY	DAR	MMR	MAR	CLT	DOV	TEX	MEM	MLW	KAN	KEN	GTW	MCH	IRP	NSH	BRI	RCH	NHA	CAL	LVS	SBO	TEX	MAR	PHO	HOM; DNQ	NA	-	

=== American open–wheel racing results ===
(key) (Races in bold indicate pole position)

==== IndyCar Series ====
IndyCar Series results
Year	Team	Chassis	No.	Engine	1	2	3	4	5	6	7	8	9	10	11	12	13	14	15	Rank	Points	Ref
2002	PDM Racing	Dallara	18	Chevrolet	HMS	PHX	FON	NZR	INDY	TXS	PPIR	RIR	KAN	NSH	MIS	KTY	STL	CHI; DNP	TX2; 26	48th	4	
