= Trent Owens =

American racing driver and crew chief

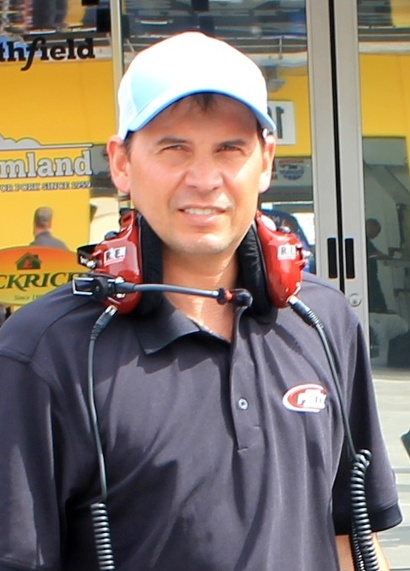
- Owens in 2014
- Born: William Trent Owens; January 4, 1975 (age 51); Darlington, South Carolina, U.S.

NASCAR FedEx Freight Truck Series career
- 12 races run over 2 years
- 2002 position: 34th
- Best finish: 34th (2002)
- First race: 2001 Jelly Belly 200 (Pikes Peak)
- Last race: 2002 O'Reilly 400K (Texas)
Wins	Top tens	Poles
0	0	0
- Statistics up to date as of March 2, 2025.

William Trent Owens (born January 4, 1975) is an American former stock car racing driver and crew chief who works for Kaulig Racing as the crew chief for their No. 16 Chevrolet Camaro ZL1 driven by A. J. Allmendinger in the NASCAR Cup Series. He was previously a driver in the NASCAR Craftsman Truck Series and the ARCA Bondo/Mar-Hyde Series. He is also the nephew of seven-time Cup Series champion Richard Petty. Owens previously crew chiefed for Petty's team as well as JTG Daugherty Racing, Braun Racing/Turner Motorsports/Turner Scott Motorsports and Bobby Gerhart Racing.

== Racing career ==
=== Driving career ===
Owens started his career while still in high school, working for Petty Enterprises, owned by his uncle Richard. He also worked at the Richard Petty Driving Experience.

In 2000, Owens attempted to qualify for the season-finale for the ARCA Bondo/Mar-Hyde Series at Atlanta in a No. 37 car owned by crew chief Barry Dodson, but he failed to qualify. He would not attempt to make any other ARCA starts. Owens made his debut in the NASCAR Craftsman Truck Series in 2001, driving the No. 49 Ford at Pikes Peak. He started 32nd, but managed a good day, finishing 19th. He then topped that run with an eighteenth at Texas before finishing 34th at Kansas. He then switched rides, competing in three events for Ware Racing Enterprises. His best run was a nineteenth, coming in the season-finale at California.

In 2002, Owens became the driver of the No. 15 Ford for Countryman Ballew Racing. He failed to qualify for the season-opener at Daytona. In the rest of the races he ran for the team (the next six races), he scored top-twenties in all but one of his starts. His best finish of the year was a fourteenth at Pikes Peak (where he had his best career start of 12th), but he also had a pair of fifteenths at Darlington and Dover. After the race at Texas, Owens was released due to funding issues. He was without a ride for the rest of the season.

=== Crew chiefing career ===
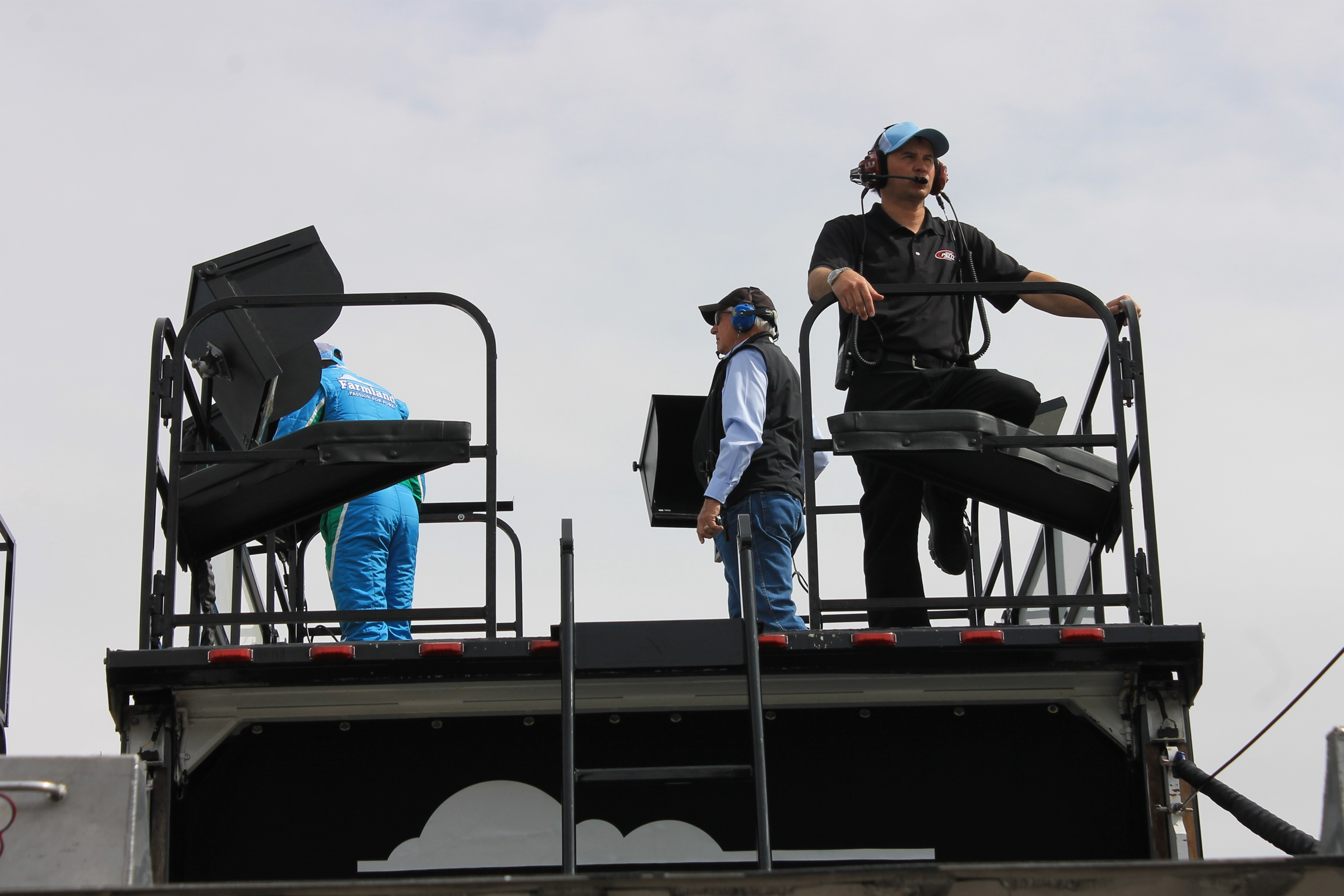
Owens atop the No. 43 RPM hauler at Las Vegas in 2014

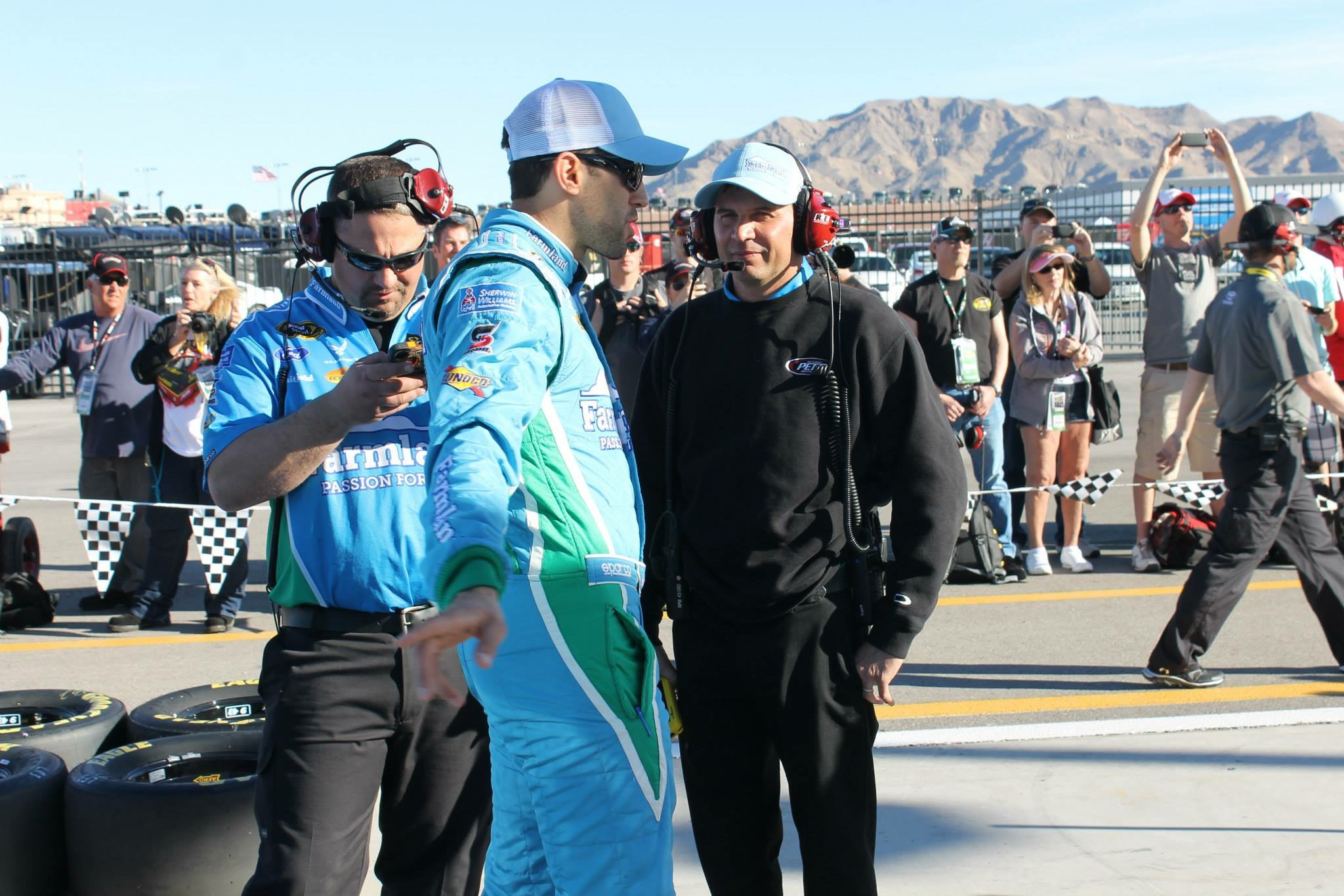
Owens and Aric Almirola talking in the garage area at Las Vegas in 2014

After being unable to find another ride, in 2003, Owens took his first crew chiefing job for Scott Traylor Motorsports's No. 5 car in the ARCA Re/Max Series, working with a young Clint Bowyer as he made his series debut at Nashville Superspeedway, helping him pull off an eye-opening second-place finish with Richard Childress in attendance, which led to Childress signing Bowyer to become a development driver for his team. Bowyer would go on to become a Cup Series driver for RCR.

Starting in 2006, Owens worked for Braun Racing, later Turner Motorsports and then Turner Scott Motorsports as a crew chief in the NASCAR Nationwide Series, scoring wins with Mark Martin, Dave Blaney, Reed Sorenson, James Buescher, and Nelson Piquet Jr. He was also the crew chief for Kyle Larson in 2013, and although he did not win any races that year, he won Rookie of the Year and moved up to a Cup Series ride with Chip Ganassi Racing the following year.

On December 2, 2013, it was announced that Owens would be moving up to the NASCAR Sprint Cup Series in 2014, having been hired by Richard Petty Motorsports to crew chief the team's No. 43 entry for driver Aric Almirola.

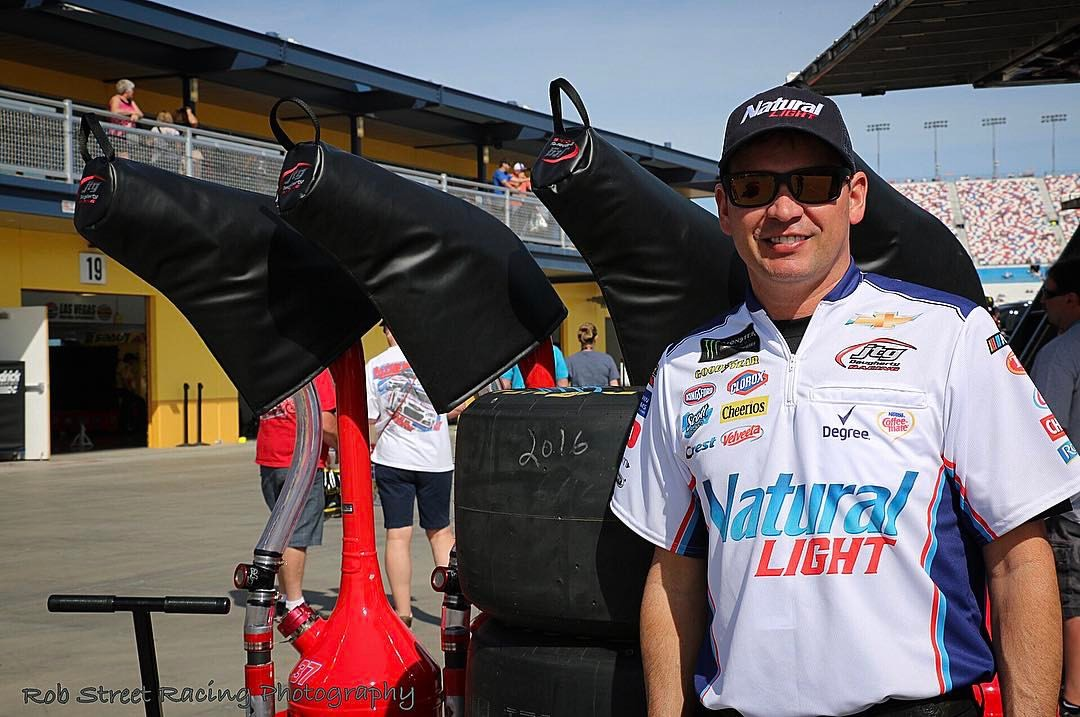
Owens in the garage area at Las Vegas in 2017

Owens was released from his contract at Richard Petty Motorsports at the end of the 2016 season. He was then hired to crew chief JTG Daugherty Racing's new second car, the No. 37, driven by Chris Buescher, in 2017.

In 2020, Buescher left for Roush Fenway Racing and he was replaced by Ryan Preece (previously the driver of JTGD's No. 47 car), and Owens remained the crew chief of the No. 37 car. Prior to the 2020 Auto Club 400 at Fontana, Owens was suspended after the car was discovered to have an illegal modification during pre-race inspection. The team was also docked 10 owner and driver points.

When the No. 37 car was closed down after the 2021 season, Owens lost his job with JTGD and moved to Kaulig Racing to crew chief their new No. 31 car in the Cup Series, driven by Justin Haley, who is the nephew of Todd Braun, the owner of Braun Racing, who Owens used to crew chief for. On February 23, 2022, Owens was suspended for four races after the No. 31 lost a wheel during the 2022 Daytona 500. On May 17, Owens was once again suspended for four races due to a tire and wheel loss during the 2022 AdventHealth 400 at Kansas.

On December 5, 2024, Kaulig announced that Owens would move to their No. 16 car in the Cup Series in 2025 where he would crew chief A. J. Allmendinger in his return to the series full-time.

== Personal life ==
Owens is married and has two children. He is the nephew of Richard Petty. His father Randy Owens, the brother of Petty's late wife Lynda, was a member of Petty's pit crew at age 19 and killed during a pit road accident when a water tank exploded due to a faulty pressure relief valve during the 1975 Winston 500. Trent was four months old at the time. His step father is fellow NASCAR crew chief Barry Dodson who won the 1989 Cup championship with driver Rusty Wallace.

== Motorsports career results ==
=== NASCAR ===
(key) (Bold – Pole position awarded by qualifying time. Italics – Pole position earned by points standings or practice time. * – Most laps led.)

==== Craftsman Truck Series ====
NASCAR Craftsman Truck Series results
Year	Team	No.	Make	1	2	3	4	5	6	7	8	9	10	11	12	13	14	15	16	17	18	19	20	21	22	23	24	NCTSC	Pts	Ref
2001	Covenant Racing Team	49	Ford	DAY	HOM	MMR	MAR	GTY	DAR	PPR; 19	DOV	TEX; 18	MEM	MLW	KAN; 34	KEN	NHA	IRP	NSH	CIC	NZH	RCH	SBO	TEX				49th	525	
2001	Ware Racing Enterprises	81	Chevy																						LVS; 27	PHO; 34	CAL; 19	49th	525	
2002	Billy Ballew Motorsports	15	Ford	DAY; DNQ	DAR; 15	MAR; 17	GTY; 20	PPR; 14	DOV; 15	TEX; 26	MEM	MLW	KAN	KEN	NHA	MCH	IRP	NSH	RCH	TEX	SBO	LVS	CAL	PHO	HOM			34th	657	

=== ARCA Bondo/Mar-Hyde Series ===
(key) (Bold – Pole position awarded by qualifying time. Italics – Pole position earned by points standings or practice time. * – Most laps led.)

ARCA Bondo/Mar-Hyde Series results
Year	Team	No.	Make	1	2	3	4	5	6	7	8	9	10	11	12	13	14	15	16	17	18	19	20	ABMSC	Pts	Ref
2000	Dodson Motorsports	37	Info not available	DAY	SLM	AND	CLT	KIL	FRS	MCH	POC	TOL	KEN	BLN	POC	WIN	ISF	KEN	DSF	SLM	CLT	TAL	ATL; DNQ	N/A	0	
