= NetZero 250 =

There have been two NASCAR races named NetZero 250:

- NetZero 250 presented by John Boy & Billy, a Craftsman Truck Series race run at South Boston Speedway in 2001
- NetZero 250 (PPIR), a Busch Series race run at Pikes Peak International Raceway in 2002
