= Brian Rose (racing driver) =

American stock car racing driver

- Born: October 19, 1979 (age 47); Bowling Green, Kentucky, U.S.

NASCAR FedEx Freight Truck Series career
- 41 races run over 5 years
- Best finish: 22nd (2001, 2002)
- First race: 2001 Memphis 200 (Memphis)
- Last race: 2010 Lucas Oil 200 (Iowa)
Wins	Top tens	Poles
0	5	0

ARCA Menards Series career
- 3 races run over 2 years
- Best finish: 86th (2011)
- First race: 2011 Lucas Oil Slick Mist 200 (Daytona)
- Last race: 2014 Lucas Oil 200 Presented by MAVTV (Daytona)
Wins	Top tens	Poles
0	1	0
- Statistics up to date as of June 28, 2014.

Brian Christopher Rose (born October 19, 1979) is an American former stock car racing driver.

== Racing career ==
Rose began his NASCAR career in 2001 in the NASCAR Craftsman Truck Series. He ran fifteen races for Rick Ware in the No. 51, scoring a best finish of twelfth.

In 2002, Rose went in a new direction, joining Bobby Hamilton Racing. Driving the No. 4, he scored a career best finish of third in the season opener at Daytona International Speedway. However Rose was released later in the season. He raced for Billy Ballew Motorsports and Rick Ware Racing to finish off the season. He finished the season racing 21 races, with one top-five, five top-tens, finishing 22nd in points.

In 2003, Rose raced in two races before being suspended by NASCAR for failing to take a drug test; this followed an arrest that included charges for possession of marijuana and a handgun.

In 2010, NASCAR lifted the indefinite suspension, and Rose tried to make his first race at Nashville Superspeedway, but failed to qualify. However, the following race, he made the race at Kansas Speedway, but was caught up in a crash to end his day; he has not competed in NASCAR since 2010.

== Legal troubles ==
On June 27, 2014, Rose was indicted on charges of running a Ponzi scheme involving an allegedly fraudulent coal mining operation starting in 2011. In 2016, Rose was sentenced to prison for nine years.

== Motorsports career results ==
=== NASCAR ===
(key) (Bold – Pole position awarded by qualifying time. Italics – Pole position earned by points standings or practice time. * – Most laps led.)

==== Winston Cup Series ====
NASCAR Winston Cup Series results
Year	Team	No.	Make	1	2	3	4	5	6	7	8	9	10	11	12	13	14	15	16	17	18	19	20	21	22	23	24	25	26	27	28	29	30	31	32	33	34	35	36	NWCC	Pts	Ref
2002	Ware Racing Enterprises	51	Dodge	DAY	CAR	LVS	ATL	DAR	BRI	TEX	MAR	TAL	CAL	RCH	CLT	DOV	POC	MCH	SON	DAY	CHI	NHA	POC	IND	GLN	MCH	BRI	DAR	RCH	NHA	DOV	KAN	TAL	CLT	MAR; DNQ	ATL	CAR	PHO	HOM	N/A	0	

==== Camping World Truck Series ====
NASCAR Camping World Truck Series results
Year	Team	No.	Make	1	2	3	4	5	6	7	8	9	10	11	12	13	14	15	16	17	18	19	20	21	22	23	24	25	NCWTC	Pts	Ref
2000	Brevak Racing	31	Dodge	DAY	HOM	PHO	MMR	MAR	PIR	GTY	MEM	PPR	EVG	TEX	KEN	GLN	MLW	NHA	NZH	MCH	IRP	NSV; DNQ	CIC						N/A	0	
2000	Liberty Racing	98	Ford																					RCH; DNQ	DOV	TEX	CAL		N/A	0	
2001	Ware Racing Enterprises	51	Chevy	DAY	HOM	MMR	MAR	GTY	DAR	PPR	DOV	TEX	MEM; 28	MLW; 28	KAN; 19	KEN; 15	NHA; 23	IRP; 22	NSH; 15	CIC; 19	NZH; 19	RCH; 24	SBO; 20	TEX; 28	LVS; 26	PHO; 23			22nd	1487	
2001	Ware Racing Enterprises	51	Dodge																								CAL; 12		22nd	1487	
2002	Bobby Hamilton Racing	4	Dodge	DAY; 3	DAR; 8	MAR; 27	GTY; 8	PPR; 10	DOV; 30	TEX; 35	MEM; 10	MLW; 19	KAN; 21	KEN; 24	NHA; 25	MCH; 23	IRP												22nd	2110	
2002	Ware Racing Enterprises	51	Dodge															NSH; 25					CAL; 27	PHO; 23	HOM; 33				22nd	2110	
2002	Billy Ballew Motorsports	15	Ford																RCH; 25	TEX; 16	SBO; 22								22nd	2110	
2002	Team Racing	25	Chevy																			LVS; 35							22nd	2110	
2003	Carpenter Group Racing	57	Dodge	DAY; DNQ	DAR; 14	MMR	MAR; 24	CLT	DOV	TEX	MEM	MLW	KAN	KEN	GTW	MCH	IRP	NSH	BRI	RCH	NHA	CAL	LVS	SBO	TEX	MAR	PHO	HOM	78th	212	
2010	Rick Ware Racing	6	Chevy	DAY	ATL	MAR	NSH; DNQ	KAN; 32	DOV	CLT																			70th	258	
2010	Team Gill Racing	46	Dodge								TEX; 26	MCH	IOW; 19	GTY	IRP	POC	NSH	DAR	BRI	CHI	KEN	NHA	LVS	MAR	TAL	TEX	PHO	HOM	70th	258	

=== ARCA Racing Series ===
(key) (Bold – Pole position awarded by qualifying time. Italics – Pole position earned by points standings or practice time. * – Most laps led.)

ARCA Racing Series results
Year	Team	No.	Make	1	2	3	4	5	6	7	8	9	10	11	12	13	14	15	16	17	18	19	20	ARSC	Pts	Ref
2011	Brian Rose Motorsports	19	Toyota	DAY; 42	TAL; 7	SLM	TOL	NJE	CHI	POC	MCH	WIN	BLN	IOW	IRP	POC	ISF	MAD	DSF	SLM	KAN	TOL		86th	225	
2014	Brian Rose Motorsports	19	Dodge	DAY; 15	MOB	SLM	TAL	TOL	NJE	POC	MCH	ELK	WIN	CHI	IRP	POC	BLN	ISF	MAD	DSF	SLM	KEN	KAN	103rd	155	
