= Rodney Sawyers =

Former NASCAR driver

- Born: July 27, 1967 (age 59); Ridgeway, Virginia, U.S.

NASCAR O'Reilly Auto Parts Series career
- 2 races run over 1 year
- Best finish: 135th (2001)
- First race: 2001 Carquest Auto Parts 250 (Gateway)
- Last race: 2001 Kroger 200 (IRP)
Wins	Top tens	Poles
0	0	0

NASCAR FedEx Freight Truck Series career
- 12 races run over 2 years
- Best finish: 37th (2002)
- First race: 2001 Darlington 200 (Darlington)
- Last race: 2002 GNC Live Well 200 (Milwaukee)
Wins	Top tens	Poles
0	0	0
- Statistics up to date as of June 15, 2010.

Rodney Sawyers (born July 27, 1967) is an American former NASCAR driver. He competed limited schedules in the racing series in 2001 and 2002.

== Early stock car career ==
In a chaotic pair of qualifying races for the 1993 Goody's 150 Late Model Stock Car, Sawyers took first place as a regional racer. The event involved the disqualification of 13 drivers for drive-shaft sizing issues.

== Busch Series career ==
Sawyers ran an R & D Ford for two races in 2001 NASCAR Busch Series, helping out Hensley Racing. He made his first career race at Gateway, qualifying 34th. However, he fell out of the race extremely early and finishing 43rd, last place on the field. Sawyers then had a solid qualifying effort of 20th at IRP, before finishing 39th in the event due to clutch problems. Those were his only career starts in that series.

== Craftsman Truck Series career ==
Sawyers ran six races a piece in this series in 2001 and 2002 seasons of the NASCAR Craftsman Truck Series. Sawyers drove his own #68 truck in 2001, making his series debut at Darlington. It was a good run for his team, as he started 26th, but managed an 18th-place run. In fact, all around it was a good year for Sawyers. He was in the top-20 five times in his six starts. Those were highlighted by a pair of 17ths at IRP and Nazareth.

Sawyers had another solid year in 2002, finishing no worse than 27th. His best career finish was set. He was 15th at Martinsville, one week before rolling to another solid run of 18th at Gateway. Sawyers other top-20 was a 19th at Pikes Peak.

Unfortunately, Sawyers team ran out of funding midway through 2002, and a promising career was axed. He has not raced in major NASCAR since a 27th-place finish at the Milwaukee Mile.
