= Chris Horn (racing driver) =

American stock car racing driver

- Born: Chris Horn; November 11, 1973 (age 52); Cedar Rapids, Iowa, U.S.

NASCAR O'Reilly Auto Parts Series career
- 8 races run over 4 years
- Best finish: 110th (2007)
- First race: 2005 Meijer 300 (Kentucky)
- Last race: 2009 Meijer 300 (Kentucky)
Wins	Top tens	Poles
0	0	0

NASCAR FedEx Freight Truck Series career
- 29 races run over 7 years
- Best finish: 36th (2003)
- First race: 1998 Tempus Resorts 300K (Pikes Peak)
- Last race: 2003 Silverado 350 (Texas)
Wins	Top tens	Poles
0	0	0
- Statistics up to date as of April 11, 2023.

Chris Horn (born November 11, 1973) is a retired American stock car racing driver. Horn competed in eight NASCAR Xfinity Series races and twenty-nine NASCAR Camping World Truck Series races.

== Motorsports career results ==
=== NASCAR ===
(key) (Bold – Pole position awarded by qualifying time. Italics – Pole position earned by points standings or practice time. * – Most laps led.)

==== Nationwide Series ====
NASCAR Nationwide Series results
Year	Team	No.	Make	1	2	3	4	5	6	7	8	9	10	11	12	13	14	15	16	17	18	19	20	21	22	23	24	25	26	27	28	29	30	31	32	33	34	35	NNSC	Pts	Ref
2004	Horn Auto Racing	58	Chevy	DAY	CAR	LVS	DAR	BRI	TEX	NSH	TAL	CAL	GTY	RCH	NZH	CLT	DOV	NSH	KEN; DNQ	MLW	DAY	CHI	NHA	PPR	IRP	MCH	BRI	CAL	RCH	DOV									N/A	0	
2004	Horn Auto Racing	80	Chevy																												KAN; DNQ	CLT	MEM	ATL	PHO	DAR	HOM		N/A	0	
2005	Horn Auto Racing	80	Chevy	DAY	CAL	MXC	LVS	ATL	NSH	BRI	TEX	PHO	TAL	DAR	RCH	CLT	DOV	NSH	KEN; 43	MLW	DAY	CHI; DNQ	NHA	PPR	GTY	IRP	GLN	MCH	BRI	CAL	RCH	DOV	KAN; DNQ	CLT	MEM	TEX	PHO	HOM	146th	34	
2006	Horn Auto Racing	58	Chevy	DAY	CAL	MXC	LVS	ATL	BRI	TEX	NSH	PHO	TAL	RCH	DAR	CLT	DOV	NSH	KEN; 37	MLW; 39	DAY	CHI; Wth	NHA	MAR	GTY	IRP	GLN	MCH	BRI	CAL	RCH	DOV	KAN; 38	CLT	MEM	TEX	PHO	HOM	112th	104	
2007	Horn Auto Racing	58	Chevy	DAY	CAL	MXC	LVS	ATL	BRI	NSH	TEX	PHO	TAL	RCH	DAR	CLT	DOV	NSH	KEN; 35	MLW; 40	NHA	DAY	CHI; DNQ	GTY	IRP	CGV	GLN	MCH	BRI	CAL	RCH	DOV	KAN; 30	CLT	MEM	TEX	PHO	HOM	110th	174	
2009	Horn Auto Racing	58	Chevy	DAY	CAL	LVS	BRI	TEX	NSH	PHO	TAL	RCH	DAR	CLT	DOV	NSH	KEN; 38	MLW	NHA	DAY	CHI	GTY	IRP	IOW; DNQ	GLN	MCH	BRI	CGV	ATL	RCH	DOV	KAN; DNQ	CAL	CLT	MEM	TEX	PHO	HOM	144th	49	

==== Craftsman Truck Series ====
NASCAR Craftsman Truck Series results
Year	Team	No.	Make	1	2	3	4	5	6	7	8	9	10	11	12	13	14	15	16	17	18	19	20	21	22	23	24	25	26	27	NCTC	Pts	Ref
1997	?	?	?	WDW	TUS	HOM	PHO	POR	EVG	I70	NHA	TEX	BRI	NZH	MLW	LVL	CNS	HPT; DNQ													N/A	0	
1997	?	58	?																IRP; DNQ	FLM	NSV	GLN	RCH	MAR	SON	MMR	CAL	PHO	LVS		N/A	0	
1998	Horn Auto Racing	58	Chevy	WDW	HOM	PHO	POR	EVG	I70	GLN	TEX; DNQ	BRI	MLW; DNQ	NZH	CAL	PPR; 28	IRP	NHA	FLM	NSV	HPT; 17	LVL	RCH	MEM	GTY; 27	MAR	SON	MMR	PHO	LVS; DNQ	47th	375	
1999	Horn Auto Racing	58	Chevy	HOM	PHO	EVG	MMR	MAR	MEM	PPR; 32	I70	BRI	TEX; 37	PIR	GLN	MLW	NSV	NZH	MCH	NHA	IRP	GTY; DNQ	HPT	RCH			TEX; 30	CAL			51st	308	
1999	Mike Albernaz	27	Chevy																						LVS; 36	LVL					51st	308	
2000	Horn Auto Racing	58	Chevy	DAY	HOM	PHO	MMR	MAR	PIR	GTY	MEM	PPR; 16	EVG	TEX; 16	KEN; 36	GLN	MLW	NHA	NZH	MCH	IRP	NSV	CIC	RCH	DOV	TEX; 18	CAL				52nd	394	
2001	Horn Auto Racing	58	Chevy	DAY	HOM	MMR	MAR	GTY	DAR	PPR; 24	DOV	TEX	MEM	MLW; 16	KAN; 27	KEN; 33	NHA	IRP	NSH	CIC	NZH	RCH	SBO	TEX	LVS; 21	PHO	CAL				52nd	457	
2002	Horn Auto Racing	58	Chevy	DAY	DAR	MAR	GTY	PPR; 31	DOV	TEX	MEM	MLW	KAN; 14	KEN; 33	NHA	MCH; 30	IRP	NSH	RCH	TEX	SBO	LVS; 30	CAL; 25	PHO	HOM						39th	489	
2003	Horn Auto Racing	58	Chevy	DAY	DAR	MMR	MAR	CLT; 33	DOV	TEX; 30	MEM	MLW	KAN; 22	KEN; 14	GTW; 31	MCH; 17	IRP	NSH	BRI	RCH	NHA	CAL	LVS; DNQ	SBO	TEX; 25	MAR	PHO	HOM			36th	625	
