= Coy Gibbs =

American stock car racing driver and owner (1972–2022)

- Born: Coy Randall Gibbs; December 9, 1972; Fayetteville, Arkansas, U.S.
- Died: November 6, 2022 (aged 49); Avondale, Arizona, U.S.

NASCAR O'Reilly Auto Parts Series career
- 39 races run over 2 years
- Best finish: 14th (2003)
- First race: 2002 Aaron's 312 (Talladega)
- Last race: 2003 Ford 300 (Homestead)
Wins	Top tens	Poles
0	2	0

NASCAR FedEx Freight Truck Series career
- 58 races run over 3 years
- Best finish: 10th (2001, 2002)
- First race: 2000 NAPA 250 (Martinsville)
- Last race: 2002 Ford 200 (Homestead)
Wins	Top tens	Poles
0	21	0

Coy Randall Gibbs (December 9, 1972 – November 6, 2022) was an American racing driver, assistant coach with the Washington Redskins, and co-owner of Joe Gibbs Racing. He was the son of Joe Gibbs, five-time NASCAR Cup Series championship-winning owner and Pro Football Hall of Famer.

== Football ==
Gibbs played college football as a linebacker at Stanford University from 1991 to 1994. He led the Cardinal in tackles as a senior. In 2004, after his father was re-hired as the Redskins coach, he joined the team as an offensive quality control assistant, serving in that capacity until 2007.

== Racing career ==
Gibbs made his NASCAR debut in the Craftsman Truck Series in 2000, sharing the driving duties of the No. 20 Chevrolet with his brother J. D. In 2001, he began racing a full-time schedule, posting two top-five finishes, and finishing tenth in points both in 2001 and 2002. In 2003, he replaced Mike McLaughlin in the Busch Series, nailing down two top-ten finishes and being named runner-up in the Rookie of the Year race to David Stremme. He retired from racing at the conclusion of the season.

=== Kevin Harvick incident ===
One of Gibbs' more notable moments in NASCAR came in 2002, when he and Kevin Harvick raced in the spring Truck Series race at Martinsville Speedway. Gibbs, driving the No. 20 truck for his father's team, made contact with Harvick, who was driving the No. 6 truck that he owned, during the race. Harvick retaliated later on by intentionally wrecking Gibbs' after a restart, which resulted in the No. 6 being parked for the remainder of the race. Although Harvick denied his actions were intentional, radio communications proved otherwise and, since Harvick was already on probation after he got into a physical altercation with Greg Biffle after the Busch Series race at Bristol Motor Speedway two weeks earlier, the incident with Gibbs resulted in Harvick being suspended from the Cup Series race at Martinsville one day later. Harvick was also fined $35,000 and was put into another probation for the rest of the year.

== Motorcycle racing team ==
In August 2007, Gibbs announced the formation of Joe Gibbs Racing Motocross (JGRMX) competing in the AMA motocross and supercross championships. The race shop for JGRMX was less than a 1-mile away from the NASCAR Cup Series teams located in Huntersville, North Carolina. Gibbs headed up the operation along with help from motocross industry veteran David Evans.

== Personal life and death ==
Originally from Fayetteville, Arkansas, Gibbs lived in Cornelius, North Carolina with his wife Heather and their four children, sons Ty, Case, and Jett, and daughter Elle.

Gibbs died in his sleep of unknown causes on November 6, 2022, at the age of 49, the night during which his son Ty won the 2022 NASCAR Xfinity Series championship. His death was announced just prior to the 2022 NASCAR Cup Series Championship Race, and a moment of silence was held in his honor. Multiple drivers, including Christopher Bell, Denny Hamlin, Kyle Busch, and eventual race winner Joey Logano, a former Joe Gibbs Racing driver, paid tribute to Gibbs before and after the race, with Logano dedicating his race victory and championship to him. The death prompted Ty to withdraw from the Cup Series season finale scheduled for the next day; he was replaced by Daniel Hemric for the race.

== Motorsports career results ==
=== NASCAR ===
(key) (Bold – Pole position awarded by qualifying time. Italics – Pole position earned by points standings or practice time. * – Most laps led.)

==== Busch Series ====
NASCAR Busch Series results
Year	Team	No.	Make	1	2	3	4	5	6	7	8	9	10	11	12	13	14	15	16	17	18	19	20	21	22	23	24	25	26	27	28	29	30	31	32	33	34	NBSC	Pts	Ref
2002	Joe Gibbs Racing	20	Pontiac	DAY	CAR	LVS	DAR	BRI	TEX	NSH	TAL; 41	CAL	RCH	NHA	NZH	CLT	DOV	NSH	KEN; 14	MLW	DAY	CHI	GTY	PPR	IRP	MCH	BRI; 27	DAR	RCH	DOV								61st	416	
2002	Joe Gibbs Racing	20	Chevy																												KAN; 21	CLT	MEM; 30	ATL	CAR	PHO	HOM	61st	416	
2003	Joe Gibbs Racing	18	Pontiac	DAY; 39						TAL; 9											DAY; 17																	14th	3213	
2003	Joe Gibbs Racing	18	Chevy		CAR; 14	LVS; 16	DAR; 14	BRI; 27	TEX; 10		NSH; 30	CAL; 13	RCH; 24	GTY; 36	NZH; 21	CLT; 24	DOV; 25	NSH; 31	KEN; 15	MLW; 24		CHI; 20	NHA; 19	PPR; 17	IRP; 25	MCH; 37	BRI; 22	DAR; 23	RCH; 20	DOV; 18	KAN; 21	CLT; 26	MEM; 25	ATL; 25	PHO; 28	CAR; 33	HOM; 31	14th	3213	

==== Craftsman Truck Series ====
NASCAR Craftsman Truck Series results
Year	Team	No.	Make	1	2	3	4	5	6	7	8	9	10	11	12	13	14	15	16	17	18	19	20	21	22	23	24	NCTC	Pts	Ref
2000	Joe Gibbs Racing	20	Chevy	DAY	HOM	PHO	MMR	MAR; 18	PIR	GTY; 32	MEM	PPR; 19	EVG	TEX	KEN; 19	GLN	MLW; 28	NHA; 16	NZH; 24	MCH	IRP; DNQ		CIC; 13	RCH; DNQ	DOV; 33	TEX; 34	CAL; 29	27th	1226	
2000	Joe Gibbs Racing	48	Chevy																			NSV; 16						27th	1226	
2001	Joe Gibbs Racing	20	Chevy	DAY; 7	HOM; 11	MMR; 13	MAR; DNQ	GTY; 22	DAR; 15	PPR; 31	DOV; 5	TEX; 7	MEM; 5	MLW; 13	KAN; 9	KEN; 19	NHA; 14	IRP; 13	NSH; 10	CIC; 23	NZH; 20	RCH; 18	SBO; 12	TEX; 7	LVS; 12	PHO; 31	CAL; 14	10th	2875	
2001	Ware Racing Enterprises	51	Chevy				MAR; 26																					10th	2875	
2002	Joe Gibbs Racing	20	Chevy	DAY; 28	DAR; 23	MAR; 21	GTY; 22	PPR; 9	DOV; 6	TEX; 8	MEM; 8	MLW; 3	KAN; 3	KEN; 7	NHA; 6	MCH; 7	IRP; 18	NSH; 12	RCH; 6	TEX; 2	SBO; 4	LVS; 15	CAL; 6	PHO; 6	HOM; 12			10th	3010	
