= Rick Bogart (racing driver) =

American racing driver (born 1974)

- Born: December 27, 1974 (age 51); El Cajon, California, U.S.

NASCAR FedEx Freight Truck Series career
- 4 races run over 3 years
- Best finish: 93rd (2003)
- First race: 2002 American Racing Wheels 200 (Fontana)
- Last race: 2004 Las Vegas 350 (Las Vegas)
| Wins | Top tens | Poles |
|---|---|---|
| 0 | 0 | 0 |
- Statistics up to date as of November 5, 2024.

Richard Bogart (born December 27, 1974) is an American professional stock car racing driver who has competed in the NASCAR Craftsman Truck Series and the NASCAR Winston West Series.

Bogart has also competed in series such as the Late Model Truck Series and the South West Tour Truck Series.

== Motorsports career results ==
=== NASCAR ===
(key) (Bold - Pole position awarded by qualifying time. Italics - Pole position earned by points standings or practice time. * – Most laps led.)

==== Winston Cup Series ====
NASCAR Winston Cup Series results
| Year | Team | No. | Make | 1 | 2 | 3 | 4 | 5 | 6 | 7 | 8 | 9 | 10 | 11 | 12 | 13 | 14 | 15 | 16 | 17 | 18 | 19 | 20 | 21 | 22 | 23 | 24 | 25 | 26 | 27 | 28 | 29 | 30 | 31 | 32 | 33 | 34 | 35 | 36 | NWCC | Pts | Ref |
|---|---|---|---|---|---|---|---|---|---|---|---|---|---|---|---|---|---|---|---|---|---|---|---|---|---|---|---|---|---|---|---|---|---|---|---|---|---|---|---|---|---|---|
| 2001 | Bogart Racing | 70 | Dodge | DAY | CAR | LVS | ATL | DAR | BRI | TEX | MAR | TAL | CAL | RCH | CLT | DOV | MCH | POC | SON | DAY | CHI | NHA | POC | IND | GLN | MCH | BRI | DAR | RCH | DOV | KAN | CLT | MAR | TAL | PHO; DNQ | CAR | HOM | ATL | NHA | N/A | 0 | |

==== Craftsman Truck Series ====
NASCAR Craftsman Truck Series results
| Year | Team | No. | Make | 1 | 2 | 3 | 4 | 5 | 6 | 7 | 8 | 9 | 10 | 11 | 12 | 13 | 14 | 15 | 16 | 17 | 18 | 19 | 20 | 21 | 22 | 23 | 24 | 25 | NCTC | Pts | Ref |
|---|---|---|---|---|---|---|---|---|---|---|---|---|---|---|---|---|---|---|---|---|---|---|---|---|---|---|---|---|---|---|---|
| 2002 | Bobby Hamilton Racing | 4 | Dodge | DAY | DAR | MAR | GTY | PPR | DOV | TEX | MEM | MLW | KAN | KEN | NHA | MCH | IRP | NSH | RCH | TEX | SBO | LVS | CAL; 36 | PHO | HOM | | | | 109th | 55 | |
| 2003 | Bogart Racing | 70 | Dodge | DAY | DAR | MMR | MAR | CLT | DOV | TEX | MEM | MLW | KAN | KEN | GTW | MCH | IRP | NSH | BRI | RCH | NHA | CAL; 34 | LVS; DNQ | SBO | TEX | MAR | PHO; 31 | HOM | 93rd | 131 | |
| 2004 | ThorSport Racing | 13 | Chevy | DAY | ATL | MAR | MFD | CLT | DOV | TEX | MEM | MLW | KAN | KEN | GTW | MCH | IRP | NSH | BRI | RCH | NHA | LVS; 30 | CAL | TEX | MAR | PHO | DAR | HOM | 104th | 73 | |

==== Winston West Series ====
NASCAR Winston West Series results
| Year | Team | No. | Make | 1 | 2 | 3 | 4 | 5 | 6 | 7 | 8 | 9 | 10 | 11 | 12 | 13 | 14 | NWWSC | Pts | Ref |
|---|---|---|---|---|---|---|---|---|---|---|---|---|---|---|---|---|---|---|---|---|
| 1999 | Bogart Racing | 83 | Chevy | TUS; DNQ | LVS | PHO; 30 | CAL; 30 | PPR; 25 | MMR | IRW | EVG | POR | IRW | RMR | LVS; 11 | MMR | MOT | 34th | 425 | |
| 2000 | Bogart Racing | 83 | Chevy | PHO; 7 | MMR; 24 | LVS; 22 | CAL; 21 | LAG; 17 | IRW; 24 | POR; 15 | EVG; 16 | IRW; 16 | RMR; 9 | MMR; 22 | IRW; 10 | | | 12th | 1359 | |
| 2002 | Tom Puskarich | 68 | Chevy | PHO | LVS; 17 | | | | | | | | | | | | | 25th | 371 | |
| 2002 | Bogart Racing | 70 | Dodge | | | CAL; 18 | KAN | EVG | IRW | S99 | RMR | DCS | LVS; 6 | | | | | 25th | 371 | |
| 2003 | Bogart Racing | 70 | Dodge | PHO | LVS | CAL; 14 | MAD | TCR | EVG | IRW | S99 | RMR | DCS | PHO | MMR | | | 50th | 121 | |
