= 2002 NASCAR Craftsman Truck Series =

American motorsport season

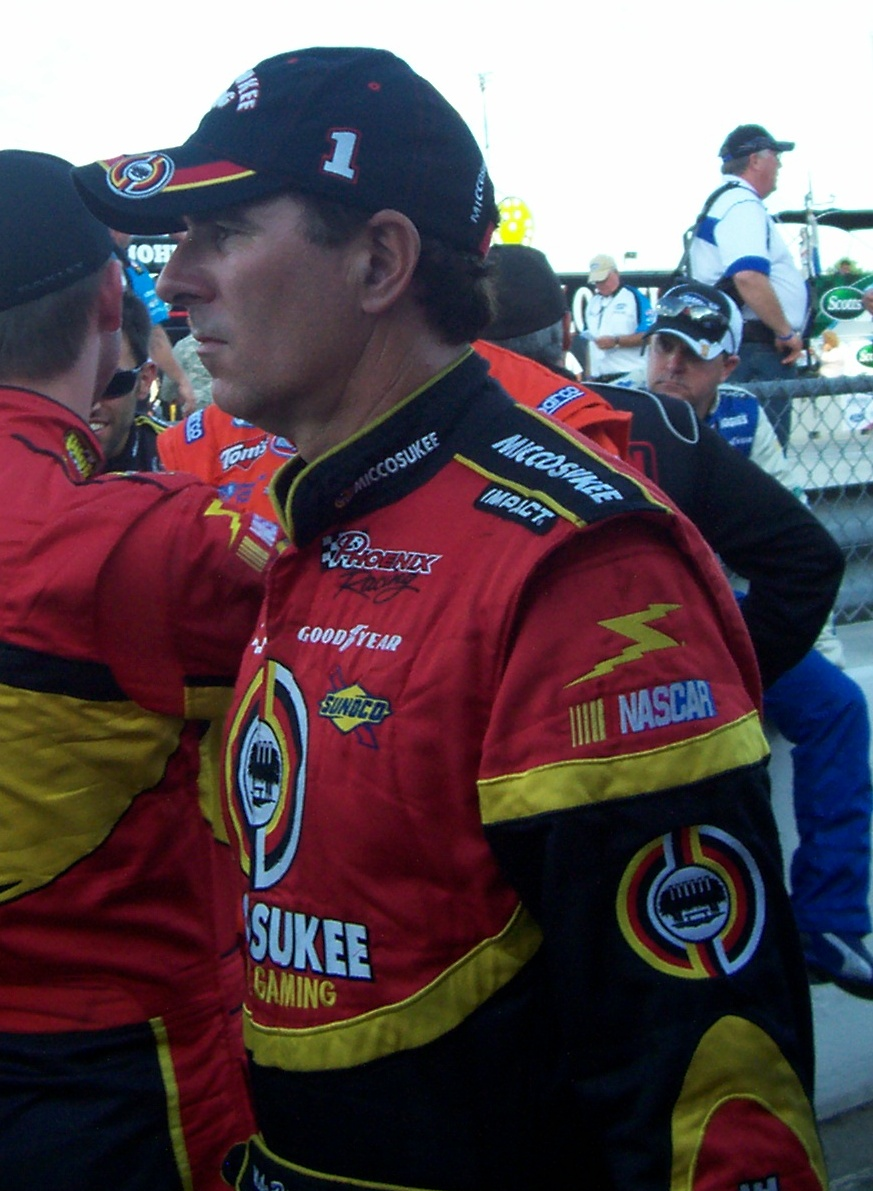
Mike Bliss, shown here in 2009, the 2002 Craftsman Truck Series champion.

The 2002 NASCAR Craftsman Truck Series was the eighth season of the Craftsman Truck Series, the third highest stock car racing series sanctioned by NASCAR in the United States. Mike Bliss of Xpress Motorsports was crowned the champion at season's end.

== 2002 teams and drivers ==
=== Full-time teams ===
| Manufacturer | Team | No. | Driver(s) | Crew chief |
Chevrolet
| Chevrolet | Addington Racing | 60 | Travis Kvapil | Rick Ren |
| Chevrolet | Green Light Racing | 07 | Jason Small (R) | Mark Blessing |
| Chevrolet | Green Light Racing | 08 | Bobby Dotter | Doug Howe |
| Chevrolet | Joe Gibbs Racing | 20 | Coy Gibbs | Doug Hewitt |
| Chevrolet | L&R Racing | 90 | Lance Norick | Gary Showalter |
| Chevrolet | MacDonald Motorsports | 72 | Randy MacDonald 18 | Steve Bird |
| Chevrolet | MacDonald Motorsports | 72 | Teri MacDonald 2 | Steve Bird |
| Chevrolet | MacDonald Motorsports | 72 | Aaron Daniel 1 | Steve Bird |
| Chevrolet | MacDonald Motorsports | 72 | Blake Mallory 1 | Steve Bird |
| Chevrolet | Morgan-Dollar Motorsports | 46 | Dennis Setzer | John Monsam 7 Danny Gill 15 |
| Chevrolet | Portenga Motorsports | 39 | Steve Portenga | George Church |
| Chevrolet | SealMaster Racing | 88 | Matt Crafton | Jerry Cook |
| Chevrolet | Spears Motorsports | 75 | David Starr | Dave McCarty |
| Chevrolet | Team Racing | 86 | Phil Bonifield 3 | Bernie Taft |
| Chevrolet | Team Racing | 86 | Wayne Edwards 2 | Bernie Taft |
| Chevrolet | Team Racing | 86 | Dana White (R) 8 | Bernie Taft |
| Chevrolet | Team Racing | 86 | Donnie Neuenberger 1 | Bernie Taft |
| Chevrolet | Team Racing | 86 | Lance Hooper 8 | Bernie Taft |
| Chevrolet | Xpress Motorsports | 16 | Mike Bliss | Dave Fuge 7 John Monsam 15 |
| Dodge | Bobby Hamilton Racing | 4 | Brian Rose 13 | Danny Rollins 6 Randy Seals 16 |
| Dodge | Bobby Hamilton Racing | 4 | Bobby Hamilton 2 | Danny Rollins 6 Randy Seals 16 |
| Dodge | Bobby Hamilton Racing | 4 | Bobby Hamilton Jr. 1 | Danny Rollins 6 Randy Seals 16 |
| Dodge | Bobby Hamilton Racing | 4 | Joe Ruttman 1 | Danny Rollins 6 Randy Seals 16 |
| Dodge | Bobby Hamilton Racing | 4 | Ryan Hemphill 4 | Danny Rollins 6 Randy Seals 16 |
| Dodge | Bobby Hamilton Racing | 4 | Rick Bogart 1 | Danny Rollins 6 Randy Seals 16 |
| Dodge | Bobby Hamilton Racing | 8 | Bill Lester (R) | Kip McCord |
| Dodge | Bobby Hamilton Racing | 18 | Robert Pressley | Danny Gill 6 Danny Rollins 16 |
| Dodge | Orleans Racing | 62 | Brendan Gaughan (R) | Shane Wilson |
| Dodge | Petty Enterprises | 43 | Carlos Contreras | Howard Comstock |
| Dodge | RDS Motorsports | 79 | Joe Ruttman 1 | Ralph Wingfield; Sammy Ware |
| Dodge | RDS Motorsports | 79 | Jerry Hill 21 | Ralph Wingfield; Sammy Ware |
| Dodge | Ultra Motorsports | 1 | Ted Musgrave | Gene Nead |
| Dodge | Ultra Motorsports | 2 | Jason Leffler | Tim Kohuth |
| Ford | Circle Bar Racing | 14 | Rick Crawford | Ray Stonkus |
| Ford | Countryman Motorsports | 15 | Trent Owens 7 | Craig Osbourne |
| Ford | Countryman Motorsports | 15 | Rich Bickle 6 | Craig Osbourne |
| Ford | Countryman Motorsports | 15 | Mark Gibson 2 | Craig Osbourne |
| Ford | Countryman Motorsports | 15 | Brian Rose 3 | Craig Osbourne |
| Ford | Countryman Motorsports | 15 | Andy Houston 4 | Craig Osbourne |
| Ford | K Automotive Racing | 29 | Terry Cook | Bob Keselowski |
| Ford | Roush Racing | 50 | Jon Wood | Dan Binks |
| Chevrolet Ford | Troxell Racing | 93 | Randy Briggs 4 | Cliff Button |
| Chevrolet Ford | Troxell Racing | 93 | Mike Harmon 1 | Cliff Button |
| Chevrolet Ford | Troxell Racing | 93 | Jerry Allec Jr. 3 | Cliff Button |
| Chevrolet Ford | Troxell Racing | 93 | Mike Leffingwell 1 (Note: Mike Leffingwell was scheduled to drive the No. 93 Chevrolet truck in the race at Gateway (race #4) but he crashed in the practice and the team did not have a backup truck. So Aaron Daniel, who failed to qualify his own No. 11 Ford truck, renumbered his own truck as No. 93 for the race.) | Cliff Button |
| Chevrolet Ford | Troxell Racing | 93 | Aaron Daniel 1 | Cliff Button |
| Chevrolet Ford | Troxell Racing | 93 | Larry Gunselman 1 | Cliff Button |
| Chevrolet Ford | Troxell Racing | 93 | Randy MacDonald 4 (Note: Entries were fielded in a collaboration with MacDonald Motorsports.) | Cliff Button |
| Chevrolet Ford | Troxell Racing | 93 | Teri MacDonald 2 | Cliff Button |
| Chevrolet Ford | Troxell Racing | 93 | Michael Dokken 3 | Cliff Button |
| Chevrolet Ford | Troxell Racing | 93 | Norm Benning 1 | Cliff Button |
| Chevrolet Ford | Troxell Racing | 93 | Jody Lavender 1 | Cliff Button |
| Chevrolet Ford | Troxell Racing | 93 | Brad Bennett 1 | Cliff Button |

=== Part-time teams ===
Note: If under "team", the owner's name is listed and in italics, that means the name of the race team that fielded the truck is unknown.

| Manufacturer | Team | No. | Driver(s) | Crew chief | Rounds |
|---|---|---|---|---|---|
| Chevrolet | Andy Petree Racing | 33 | Andy Petree | ??? | 2 |
| Chevrolet | Andy Petree Racing | 33 | Tony Stewart | ??? | 1 |
| Chevrolet | Bo-Co Performance | 74 | Bobby Coffey | ??? | 8 |
| Chevrolet | Cavin Councilor | 56 | Mike Swaim Jr. | Lee Leslie | 2 |
| Chevrolet | Conely Racing | 7 | Bryan Reffner | John Conely | 3 |
| Chevrolet | Dennis Sockwell | 54 | Brian Sockwell | Todd Hall | 6 |
| Chevrolet | Donald Thompson | 92 | Jeremy Thompson | ??? | 1 |
| Chevrolet | EVI Motorsports | 89 | Stan Boyd | Ed Huckabee | 13 |
| Chevrolet | FDNY Racing | 28 | Kenny Allen | Bob Rahilly | 1 |
| Chevrolet | FDNY Racing | 28 | Joe Ruttman | Bob Rahilly | 1 |
| Chevrolet | FDNY Racing | 28 | L. W. Miller | Bob Rahilly | 1 |
| Chevrolet | FDNY Racing | 28 | Conrad Burr | Bob Rahilly | 6 |
| Chevrolet | Fierce Creature Racing | 05 | Bobby Hillis Jr. | Duane Drummand | 2 |
| Chevrolet | Gerald Miller | 32 | Jerry Miller | Mike Seibert | 1 |
| Chevrolet | Harvick Motorsports | 6 | Rick Carelli | Ed Berrier | 1 |
| Chevrolet | Harvick Motorsports | 6 | Kevin Harvick | Ed Berrier | 5 |
| Chevrolet | Hendrick Motorsports | 24 | Ron Hornaday Jr. | ??? | 1 |
| Chevrolet | Horn Auto Racing | 58 | Chris Horn | Kevin Cram | 6 |
| Chevrolet | Jody McCormick | 77 | Jody McCormick | Jeremy McCormick | 4 |
| Chevrolet | Joe Gibbs Racing | 48 | J. D. Gibbs | ??? | 1 |
| Chevrolet | Keller Motorsports | 27 | Doug Keller | David Bringham | 5 |
| Chevrolet | Ken Schrader Racing | 52 | Mike Wallace | Donnie Richeson | 4 |
| Chevrolet | Ken Schrader Racing | 52 | Ken Schrader | Donnie Richeson | 8 |
| Chevrolet | Maurtco Motorsports | 59 | Joe Cooksey | ??? | 2 |
| Chevrolet | McGlynn Racing | 00 | Ryan McGlynn | Bob Kocher | 4 |
| Chevrolet | Midgley Racing | 09 | Mike Hamby | Dick Midgley | 1 |
| Chevrolet | Midgley Racing | 09 | John Mickel | Dick Midgley | 2 |
| Chevrolet | Portenga Motorsports | 38 | Wayne Edwards | ??? | 1 |
| Chevrolet | ReyBen Racing | 40 | Brad Bennett | ??? | 1 |
| Chevrolet | Richardson Motorsports | 0 | Stan Boyd | Larry Richardson | 2 |
| Chevrolet | Richardson Motorsports | 0 | Jason White | Larry Richardson | 1 |
| Chevrolet | Richardson Motorsports | 0 | Loni Richardson (R) | Larry Richardson | 7 |
| Chevrolet | Richardson Motorsports | 0 | Patrick Lawler | Larry Richardson | 1 |
| Chevrolet | Richardson Motorsports | 0 | Michael Dokken | Larry Richardson | 1 |
| Chevrolet | Richardson Motorsports | 37 | Blake Mallory | ??? | 1 |
| Chevrolet | Roadrunner Motorsports | 02 | Jim Inglebright | Rodney Haygood | 1 |
| Chevrolet | Ronald Jones | 34 | Eric Jones | Eddie Pearson | 10 |
| Chevrolet | SealMaster Racing | 98 | Cory Kruseman | ??? | 2 |
| Chevrolet | Tagsby Racing | 73 | Loni Richardson (R) | Joey Sonntag | 8 |
| Chevrolet | Tagsby Racing | 73 | Frog Hall | Joey Sonntag | 8 |
| Chevrolet | Team EJP Racing | 03 | Tom Carey Jr. | Tom Pearl | 3 |
| Chevrolet | Team EJP Racing | 03 | Barry Bodine | Tom Pearl | 2 |
| Chevrolet | Team Racing | 23 | Phil Bonifield | Tom Mazzuchi | 11 |
| Chevrolet | Team Racing | 23 | Emerson Newton-John | Tom Mazzuchi | 1 |
| Chevrolet | Team Racing | 23 | Lance Hooper | Tom Mazzuchi | 2 |
| Chevrolet | Team Racing | 23 | Dana White | Tom Mazzuchi | 4 |
| Chevrolet | Team Racing | 23 | Wayne Edwards | Tom Mazzuchi | 1 |
| Chevrolet | Team Racing | 25 | Ronnie Hornaday | William Kehrer | 1 |
| Chevrolet | Team Racing | 25 | Michael Dokken | William Kehrer | 1 |
| Chevrolet | Team Racing | 25 | Brian Tyler | William Kehrer | 1 |
| Chevrolet | Team Racing | 25 | Dana White | William Kehrer | 1 |
| Chevrolet | Team Racing | 25 | Barry Bodine | William Kehrer | 1 |
| Chevrolet | Team Racing | 25 | Brian Rose | William Kehrer | 1 |
| Chevrolet | Team Racing | 25 | Phil Bonifield | William Kehrer | 2 |
| Chevrolet | Team Rensi Motorsports | 61 | Butch Miller (Note: Entry was fielded in a collaboration with Whitmire Motorsports.) | Mark Staples | 1 |
| Chevrolet | Team Rensi Motorsports | 61 | Randy Tolsma | ??? | 1 |
| Chevrolet | Whitmire Motorsports | 40 | Vince Whitmire | Mark Staples | 2 |
| Chevrolet | Xpress Motorsports | 11 | Ron Hornaday Jr. | ??? | 1 |
| Dodge | Bobby Wellmon | 49 | Scott Kuhn | ??? | 1 |
| Dodge | Jim Collier | 41 | Clay Collier | ??? | 4 |
| Dodge | HT Motorsports with Melling Racing | 17 | Darrell Waltrip | James Harris | 2 |
| Dodge | HT Motorsports with Melling Racing | 17 | Stacy Compton | James Harris | 3 |
| Dodge | HT Motorsports with Melling Racing | 17 | Andy Houston | James Harris | 1 |
| Dodge | Mansion Motorsports | 85 | Carl Long | Keith Montgomery | 1 |
| Dodge | Petty Enterprises | 45 | Joe Ruttman | ??? | 1 |
| Dodge | Petty Enterprises | 45 | Adam Clarke | ??? | 3 |
| Dodge | Powers Motorsports | 55 | Tom Powers | Bryan Berry | 14 |
| Dodge | R&J Racing | 68 | Rodney Sawyers (R) | Jerry Sawyers | 8 |
| Dodge | RDS Motorsports | 41 | Jerry Hill | Ralph Wingfield | 1 |
| Dodge | RDS Motorsports | 41 | R. D. Smith | Ralph Wingfield | 2 |
| Dodge | Ware Racing Enterprises | 5 | Lance Hooper | Dan Kolanda | 12 |
| Dodge | Ware Racing Enterprises | 5 | Jason Hedlesky | Dan Kolanda | 1 |
| Dodge | Ware Racing Enterprises | 5 | Andy Thurman | Dan Kolanda | 2 |
| Dodge | Ware Racing Enterprises | 5 | Scott Kuhn | Dan Kolanda | 1 |
| Dodge | Ware Racing Enterprises | 5 | Scott Kirkpatrick | Dan Kolanda | 1 |
| Dodge | Ware Racing Enterprises | 5 | Mike Cofer | Dan Kolanda | 1 |
| Dodge | Ware Racing Enterprises | 51 | Michael Dokken | Ken Glen | 4 |
| Dodge | Ware Racing Enterprises | 51 | Michael Ritch | Ken Glen | 3 |
| Dodge | Ware Racing Enterprises | 51 | Ryan Hemphill | Ken Glen | 2 |
| Dodge | Ware Racing Enterprises | 51 | Donny Morelock | Ken Glen | 2 |
| Dodge | Ware Racing Enterprises | 51 | Morgan Shepherd | Ken Glen | 1 |
| Dodge | Ware Racing Enterprises | 51 | Randy Briggs | Ken Glen | 1 |
| Dodge | Ware Racing Enterprises | 51 | Blake Mallory | Ken Glen | 1 |
| Dodge | Ware Racing Enterprises | 51 | Brian Rose | Ken Glen | 4 |
| Dodge | Ware Racing Enterprises | 51 | Carl Long | Ken Glen | 1 |
| Ford | Brevak Racing | 31 | Jake Hobgood | Curt Coffey | 1 |
| Ford | Brevak Racing | 31 | Dude Teate | Curt Coffey | 2 |
| Ford | Dan Higgs | 66 | Lonnie Cox | Gary Higgs | 6 |
| Ford | Howard Bixman | 30 | Jay Sherston | ??? | 2 |
| Ford | James Bailey | 70 | Jeff Finley | ??? | 1 |
| Ford | James Bailey | 70 | Brian Ross | ??? | 2 |
| Ford | Johnny Myers | 36 | James Stephenson | ??? | 4 |
| Ford | Johnny Myers | 36 | Robby Benton | ??? | 1 |
| Ford | Ken Davis | 65 | Nathan Wulff | ??? | 1 |
| Ford | Long Brothers Racing | 84 | Richard Landreth | Charlie Long | 1 |
| Ford | Long Brothers Racing | 84 | Jamey Caudill | Charlie Long | 2 |
| Ford | MB Motorsports | 63 | Larry Gunselman | Mike Mittler | 3 |
| Ford | MB Motorsports | 63 | Carl Edwards | Mike Mittler | 7 |
| Ford | MB Motorsports | 63 | Regan Smith | Mike Mittler | 2 |
| Ford | Neil Chaffin | 87 | Chad Chaffin | ??? | 2 |
| Ford | Quality Motorsports | 04 | Mike Cofer | ??? | 2 |
| Ford | Quest Motor Racing | 37 | Matt Mullins | Ted Kennedy | 1 |
| Ford | RDR Racing | 97 | Ron Barfield Jr. | Ron Barfield Sr. | 2 |
| Ford | Ricky Sanders Racing | 19 | Ricky Sanders | ??? | 7 |
| Ford | Roush Racing | 99 | Tim Fedewa | ??? | 1 |
| Ford | Shepherd Racing | 21 | Morgan Shepherd | Carl Saylor | 15 |
| Ford | Team Chick Motorsports | 11 | Aaron Daniel | ??? | 7 |
| Ford | Tom Pistone | 59 | Tommy Pistone | Tom Pistone | 3 |
| Dodge Chevrolet | Ware Racing Enterprises | 81 | Donnie Neuenberger | Calvin Humphries | 2 |
| Dodge Chevrolet | Ware Racing Enterprises | 81 | Jonathon Price | Calvin Humphries | 2 |
| Dodge Chevrolet | Ware Racing Enterprises | 81 | Angie Wilson (R) | Calvin Humphries | 4 |
| Dodge Chevrolet | Ware Racing Enterprises | 81 | Michael Ritch | Calvin Humphries | 1 |
| Dodge Chevrolet | Ware Racing Enterprises | 81 | Jason Thom | Calvin Humphries | 1 |
| Dodge Chevrolet | Ware Racing Enterprises | 81 | Morgan Shepherd | Calvin Humphries | 1 |
| Dodge Chevrolet | Ware Racing Enterprises | 81 | Jason White | Calvin Humphries | 1 |

== Schedule ==
| No. | Race title | Track | Date |
|---|---|---|---|
| 1 | Florida Dodge Dealers 250 | Daytona International Speedway, Daytona Beach | February 15 |
| 2 | Craftsman Anniversary 200 | Darlington Raceway, Darlington | March 15 |
| 3 | Advance Auto Parts 250 | Martinsville Speedway, Ridgeway | April 13 |
| 4 | Missouri-Illinois Dodge Dealers Ram Tough 200 | Gateway International Raceway, Madison | May 5 |
| 5 | Rocky Mountain 200 presented by Dodge | Pikes Peak International Raceway, Fountain | May 19 |
| 6 | MBNA America 200 | Dover Downs International Speedway, Dover | May 31 |
| 7 | O'Reilly 400K | Texas Motor Speedway, Fort Worth | June 7 |
| 8 | O'Reilly Auto Parts 200 | Memphis Motorsports Park, Millington | June 22 |
| 9 | GNC Live Well 200 | The Milwaukee Mile, West Allis | June 29 |
| 10 | O'Reilly Auto Parts 250 | Kansas Speedway, Kansas City | July 6 |
| 11 | Kroger 225 | Kentucky Speedway, Sparta | July 13 |
| 12 | New England 200 | New Hampshire International Speedway, Loudon | July 20 |
| 13 | Michigan 200 | Michigan International Speedway, Brooklyn | July 27 |
| 14 | Power Stroke Diesel 200 | Indianapolis Raceway Park, Brownsburg | August 2 |
| 15 | Federated Auto Parts 200 | Nashville Superspeedway, Lebanon | August 10 |
| 16 | Richmond Is For Lovers 200 | Richmond International Raceway, Richmond | September 5 |
| 17 | Silverado 350 | Texas Motor Speedway, Fort Worth | September 13 |
| 18 | John Boy & Billy's Hardee's 250 | South Boston Speedway, South Boston | September 21 |
| 19 | Las Vegas 350 | Las Vegas Motor Speedway, Las Vegas | October 13 |
| 20 | American Racing Wheels 200 | California Speedway, Fontana | November 2 |
| 21 | Chevy Silverado 150 | Phoenix International Raceway, Phoenix | November 8 |
| 22 | Ford 200 | Homestead-Miami Speedway, Homestead | November 15 |

- Originally it was supposed to have a race at Chicago Motor Speedway on August 25 but the race was later cancelled.

== Races ==
=== Florida Dodge Dealers 250 ===
The Florida Dodge Dealers 250 was held February 15 at Daytona International Speedway. Ted Musgrave won the pole.

Top ten results

1. #18 - Robert Pressley*
2. #1 - Ted Musgrave
3. #4 - Brian Rose
4. #79 - Joe Ruttman
5. #6 - Rick Carelli
6. #29 - Terry Cook*
7. #75 - David Starr
8. #43 - Carlos Contreras
9. #07 - Jason Small
10. #90 - Lance Norick

Failed to qualify: Mike Swaim Jr. (#56), Jim Inglebright (#02), Trent Owens (#15), Ryan McGlynn (#00), Michael Dokken (#51), Ken Allen (#28), Ron Barfield Jr. (#97), Stan Boyd (#89), Morgan Shepherd (#21), Jerry Hill (#41), Jake Hobgood (#31)

- This was Pressley's first truck series victory. This race was also Pressley's truck series debut.
- Terry Cook suffered a 100-point penalty for a cylinder head infraction found in his truck after the race.

=== Craftsman Anniversary 200 ===
The Craftsman Anniversary 200 was March 15 at Darlington Raceway. Jason Leffler won the pole.

Top ten results

1. #1 - Ted Musgrave
2. #18 - Robert Pressley
3. #16 - Mike Bliss
4. #6 - Kevin Harvick
5. #14 - Rick Crawford
6. #75 - David Starr
7. #60 - Travis Kvapil
8. #4 - Brian Rose
9. #50 - Jon Wood
10. #52 - Ken Schrader

Failed to qualify: Mike Swaim Jr. (#56), Ron Barfield Jr. (#97), Rodney Sawyers (#68), Mike Harmon (#93), Ricky Sanders (#19), Phil Bonifield (#23)

=== Advance Auto Parts 250 ===
The Advance Auto Parts 250 was held April 13 at Martinsville Speedway. Ted Musgrave won the pole. The race is best known for an incident involving Kevin Harvick and Coy Gibbs, in which Harvick spun Gibbs out after previous contact. NASCAR responded by parking Harvick for the rest of the race. In the post-race interview, Harvick claimed that he did not intentionally crash Gibbs despite radio transmissions stating otherwise. This resulted in Harvick being suspended from the cup race the next day, as he was already on probation for a previous run-in with Greg Biffle in the Busch Series.

Top ten results

1. #46 - Dennis Setzer
2. #16 - Mike Bliss
3. #14 - Rick Crawford
4. #08 - Bobby Dotter
5. #29 - Terry Cook
6. #2 - Jason Leffler
7. #60 - Travis Kvapil
8. #75 - David Starr
9. #62 - Brendan Gaughan
10. #50 - Jon Wood

Failed to qualify: Steve Portenga (#39), L. W. Miller (#28), Brian Sockwell (#54), Dana White (#86), Tommy Pistone (#59), Jody McCormick (#77), Jerry Allec Jr. (#93), Vince Whitmire (#40), James Stephenson (#36), Bobby Coffey (#74), R. D. Smith (#41)

=== Missouri-Illinois Dodge Dealers Ram Tough 200 ===
The Missouri-Illinois Dodge Dealers Ram Tough 200 was held May 5 at Gateway International Raceway. Mike Bliss won the pole.

Top ten results

1. #29 - Terry Cook*
2. #2 - Jason Leffler
3. #16 - Mike Bliss
4. #14 - Rick Crawford
5. #75 - David Starr
6. #46 - Dennis Setzer
7. #50 - Jon Wood
8. #4 - Brian Rose
9. #90 - Lance Norick
10. #88 - Matt Crafton

Failed to qualify: R.D. Smith (#41), Aaron Daniel (#11), Phil Bonifield (#23), Scott Kuhn (#49)

- Aaron Daniel replaced Mike Leffingwell in the #93 car in the race, after failing to qualify his #11.
- This was Cook's first Truck Series victory since 1998.

=== Rocky Mountain 200 presented by Dodge ===
The Rocky Mountain 200 presented by Dodge was held May 19 at Pikes Peak International Raceway. Jason Leffler won the pole.

Top ten results

1. #16 - Mike Bliss
2. #2 - Jason Leffler
3. #60 - Travis Kvapil
4. #29 - Terry Cook
5. #75 - David Starr
6. #14 - Rick Crawford
7. #46 - Dennis Setzer
8. #39 - Steve Portenga
9. #20 - Coy Gibbs
10. #4 - Brian Rose

Failed to qualify: Ricky Sanders (#19), Bobby Coffey (#74)

=== MBNA America 200 ===
The MBNA America 200 was held May 31 at Dover International Speedway. Rick Crawford won the pole.

Top ten results

1. #1 - Ted Musgrave
2. #18 - Robert Pressley
3. #14 - Rick Crawford
4. #75 - David Starr
5. #16 - Mike Bliss
6. #20 - Coy Gibbs
7. #62 - Brendan Gaughan
8. #03 - Tom Carey
9. #2 - Jason Leffler
10. #29 - Terry Cook

Failed to qualify: Donnie Neuenberger (#86), Phil Bonifield (#23), Loni Richardson (#73), Bobby Coffey (#74)

=== O'Reilly 400K ===
The O'Reilly 400K was held June 7 at Texas Motor Speedway. Jason Leffler won the pole.

Top ten results

1. #62 - Brendan Gaughan*
2. #60 - Travis Kvapil
3. #75 - David Starr
4. #14 - Rick Crawford
5. #1 - Ted Musgrave
6. #18 - Robert Pressley
7. #88 - Matt Crafton
8. #20 - Coy Gibbs
9. #50 - Jon Wood
10. #90 - Lance Norick

Failed to qualify: none

- This was Gaughan's first career Truck Series victory.

=== O'Reilly Auto Parts 200 ===
The O'Reilly Auto Parts 200 was held June 22 at Memphis Motorsports Park. Jason Leffler won the pole.

Top ten results

1. #60 - Travis Kvapil
2. #29 - Terry Cook
3. #1 - Ted Musgrave
4. #2 - Jason Leffler
5. #46 - Dennis Setzer
6. #15 - Rich Bickle
7. #75 - David Starr
8. #20 - Coy Gibbs
9. #14 - Rick Crawford
10. #4 - Brian Rose

Failed to qualify: Aaron Daniel (#11), Joe Cooksey (#59), Jody McCormick (#77), Eric Jones (#34), Nathan Wulff (#65), Loni Richardson (#0), Bobby Coffey (#74), David Hall (#73), James Stephenson (#36), Blake Mallory (#37)

- Carl Edwards made his Truck Series debut in this race, starting 16th and finishing 23rd, 2 laps down. This was his first of seven truck races he made in the 2002 season.

=== GNC Live Well 200 ===
The GNC Live Well 200 was held June 29 at The Milwaukee Mile. Terry Cook won the pole.

Top ten results

1. #29 - Terry Cook
2. #2 - Jason Leffler
3. #20 - Coy Gibbs
4. #62 - Brendan Gaughan
5. #1 - Ted Musgrave
6. #75 - David Starr
7. #18 - Robert Pressley
8. #16 - Mike Bliss
9. #50 - Jon Wood
10. #60 - Travis Kvapil

Failed to qualify: Loni Richardson (#0), Aaron Daniel (#11)

=== O'Reilly Auto Parts 250 ===
The O'Reilly Auto Parts 250 was held July 6 at Kansas Speedway. Jason Leffler won the pole.

Top ten results

1. #16 - Mike Bliss
2. #46 - Dennis Setzer
3. #20 - Coy Gibbs
4. #2 - Jason Leffler
5. #1 - Ted Musgrave
6. #29 - Terry Cook
7. #18 - Robert Pressley
8. #63 - Carl Edwards
9. #50 - Jon Wood
10. #88 - Matt Crafton

Failed to qualify: Lonnie Cox (#66), Loni Richardson (#0), David Hall (#73)

=== Kroger 225 ===
The Kroger 225 was held July 13 at Kentucky Speedway. Jason Leffler won the pole.

Top ten results

1. #16 - Mike Bliss
2. #46 - Dennis Setzer
3. #18 - Robert Pressley
4. #14 - Rick Crawford
5. #2 - Jason Leffler
6. #29 - Terry Cook
7. #20 - Coy Gibbs
8. #75 - David Starr
9. #1 - Ted Musgrave
10. #39 - Steve Portenga

Failed to qualify: Morgan Shepherd (#21), Rodney Sawyers (#68), Vince Whitmire (#40), Dana White (#86), Lonnie Cox (#66), Ricky Sanders (#19), Tom Powers (#55), David Hall (#73), Loni Richardson (#0)

=== New England 200 ===
The New England 200 was held July 20 at New Hampshire International Speedway. Jason Leffler won the pole.

Top ten results

1. #29 - Terry Cook
2. #46 - Dennis Setzer
3. #75 - David Starr
4. #1 - Ted Musgrave
5. #62 - Brendan Gaughan
6. #20 - Coy Gibbs
7. #60 - Travis Kvapil
8. #6 - Kevin Harvick
9. #18 - Robert Pressley
10. #16 - Mike Bliss

Failed to qualify: none

=== Michigan 200 ===
The Michigan 200 was held July 27 at Michigan International Speedway. Ted Musgrave won the pole.

Top ten results

1. #18 - Robert Pressley
2. #2 - Jason Leffler
3. #60 - Travis Kvapil
4. #16 - Mike Bliss*
5. #75 - David Starr
6. #29 - Terry Cook
7. #20 - Coy Gibbs
8. #90 - Lance Norick
9. #14 - Rick Crawford
10. #50 - Jon Wood

Failed to qualify: none

- Ted Musgrave suffered a blown engine and finished 32nd, losing the championship points lead to Mike Bliss, who would go on to hold it for the rest of the season.

=== Power Stroke Diesel 200 ===
The Power Stroke Diesel 200 was held August 2 at Indianapolis Raceway Park. Terry Cook won the pole.

Top ten results

1. #29 - Terry Cook*
2. #2 - Jason Leffler
3. #60 - Travis Kvapil
4. #52 - Mike Wallace
5. #18 - Robert Pressley
6. #17 - Darrell Waltrip
7. #90 - Lance Norick
8. #50 - Jon Wood
9. #08 - Bobby Dotter
10. #88 - Matt Crafton

Failed to qualify: Dude Teate (#31), Clay Collier (#41), Jay Sherston (#30), Bobby Coffey (#74), Tom Powers (#55)

- This would be Cook's last Truck Series victory until 2006, and the last victory for K-Automotive Racing.

=== Federated Auto Parts 200 ===
The Federated Auto Parts 200 was held August 10 at Nashville Superspeedway. Mike Bliss won the pole.

Top ten results

1. #16 - Mike Bliss
2. #14 - Rick Crawford
3. #1 - Ted Musgrave
4. #4 - Bobby Hamilton Jr.
5. #46 - Dennis Setzer
6. #62 - Brendan Gaughan
7. #29 - Terry Cook
8. #50 - Jon Wood
9. #18 - Robert Pressley
10. #2 - Mike Wallace

Failed to qualify: Tom Powers (#55), Phil Bonifield (#23)

=== Richmond Is For Lovers 200 ===
The Richmond Is For Lovers 200 was held September 5 at Richmond International Raceway. Jason Leffler won the pole.

Top ten results

1. #33 - Tony Stewart*
2. #6 - Kevin Harvick
3. #16 - Mike Bliss
4. #14 - Rick Crawford
5. #29 - Terry Cook
6. #20 - Coy Gibbs
7. #1 - Ted Musgrave
8. #17 - Stacy Compton
9. #08 - Bobby Dotter
10. #52 - Ken Schrader

Failed to qualify: Stan Boyd (#89), Brad Bennett (#40), Dana White (#23), Clay Collier (#41), Loni Richardson (#73), Tommy Pistone (#59), James Stephenson (#36), Jody McCormick (#77), Bobby Coffey (#74), Conrad Burr (#28)

- This was Stewart's first career Truck Series victory, coming in his second career start.
- Bobby Hamilton sustained injuries in a last-lap crash that caused him to miss several races of the 2002 Winston Cup season.

=== Silverado 350 ===
The Silverado 350 was held September 13 at Texas Motor Speedway. Mike Bliss won the pole.

Top ten results

1. #62 - Brendan Gaughan
2. #20 - Coy Gibbs
3. #75 - David Starr
4. #14 - Rick Crawford
5. #60 - Travis Kvapil
6. #1 - Ted Musgrave
7. #18 - Robert Pressley
8. #2 - Jason Leffler
9. #16 - Mike Bliss
10. #46 - Dennis Setzer

Failed to qualify: none

=== John Boy & Billy's Hardee's 250 ===
The John Boy & Billy's Hardee's 250 was held September 21 at South Boston Speedway. Ted Musgrave won the pole.

Top ten results

1. #16 - Mike Bliss
2. #46 - Dennis Setzer
3. #14 - Rick Crawford
4. #20 - Coy Gibbs
5. #60 - Travis Kvapil
6. #50 - Jon Wood
7. #75 - David Starr
8. #08 - Bobby Dotter
9. #2 - Jason Leffler
10. #4 - Ryan Hemphill

Failed to qualify: Jeremy Thompson (#92), Dude Teate (#31), Jay Sherston (#30), Bobby Coffey (#74), James Stephenson (#36)

=== Las Vegas 350 ===
The Las Vegas 350 was held October 13 at Las Vegas Motor Speedway. David Starr won the pole.

Top ten results

1. #75 - David Starr*
2. #16 - Mike Bliss
3. #46 - Dennis Setzer
4. #60 - Travis Kvapil
5. #2 - Jason Leffler
6. #14 - Rick Crawford
7. #18 - Robert Pressley
8. #62 - Brendan Gaughan
9. #1 - Ted Musgrave
10. #07 - Jason Small

Failed to qualify: Jerry Allec Jr. (#93), Tom Powers (#55)

- This was Starr's first career Truck Series victory, and the first victory for Spears Motorsports.

=== American Racing Wheels 200 ===
The American Racing Wheels 200 was held November 2 at California Speedway. David Starr won the pole.

Top ten results

1. #1 - Ted Musgrave
2. #2 - Jason Leffler
3. #62 - Brendan Gaughan
4. #60 - Travis Kvapil
5. #14 - Rick Crawford
6. #20 - Coy Gibbs
7. #18 - Robert Pressley
8. #46 - Dennis Setzer
9. #16 - Mike Bliss
10. #29 - Terry Cook

Failed to qualify: Bobby Hillis Jr. (#05)

- Ryan Hemphill wrecked his #4 truck in practice and was not medically cleared to race. He was replaced in the race by Rick Bogart.

=== Chevy Silverado 150 ===
The Chevy Silverado 150 was held November 8 at Phoenix International Raceway. Rick Crawford won the pole.

Top ten results

1. #6 - Kevin Harvick*
2. #1 - Ted Musgrave
3. #14 - Rick Crawford
4. #60 - Travis Kvapil
5. #29 - Terry Cook
6. #20 - Coy Gibbs
7. #52 - Ken Schrader
8. #46 - Dennis Setzer
9. #88 - Matt Crafton
10. #16 - Mike Bliss

Failed to qualify: Clay Collier (#41), Lonnie Cox (#66), Ricky Sanders (#19), Loni Richardson (#0), John Mickel (#09), Bobby Hillis Jr. (#05)

- This was Harvick's first career Truck Series victory.

=== Ford 200 ===
The Ford 200 was held November 15 at Homestead-Miami Speedway. Mike Bliss won the pole.

Top ten results

1. #11 - Ron Hornaday Jr.
2. #1 - Ted Musgrave
3. #2 - Jason Leffler
4. #18 - Robert Pressley
5. #16 - Mike Bliss
6. #46 - Dennis Setzer
7. #14 - Rick Crawford
8. #75 - David Starr
9. #88 - Matt Crafton
10. #29 - Terry Cook

Failed to qualify: Robby Benton (#36), Adam Clarke (#45), Cory Kruseman (#98), Phil Bonifield (#25), Loni Richardson (#0), John Mickel (#09), Dana White (#23)

- This was the last NASCAR race broadcast on ESPN in any of NASCAR's top three series until 2007.

== Full Drivers' Championship ==
(key) Bold – Pole position awarded by time. Italics – Pole position set by owner's points. * – Most laps led.

| Pos | Driver | DAY | DAR | MAR | GTW | PPR | DOV | TEX | MEM | MIL | KAN | KEN | NHA | MCH | IRP | NSH | RCH | TEX | SBO | LVS | CAL | PHO | HOM | Points |
|---|---|---|---|---|---|---|---|---|---|---|---|---|---|---|---|---|---|---|---|---|---|---|---|---|
| 1 | Mike Bliss | 33 | 3 | 2 | **3** | 1 | 5 | 12 | 18 | 8 | 1 | 1* | 10 | 4 | 15 | **1** | 3 | **9** | 1 | 2* | 9 | 10 | **5** | 3359 |
| 2 | Rick Crawford | 24 | 5 | 3 | 4 | 6 | **3** | 4 | 9 | 14 | 12* | 4 | 17 | 9 | 11 | 2 | 4 | 4* | 3 | 6 | 5 | **3*** | 7 | 3313 |
| 3 | Ted Musgrave | 2 | 1* | **24*** | 12 | 16 | 1* | 5 | 3 | 5 | 5 | 9 | 4 | 32 | 16 | 3* | 7 | 6 | **14*** | 9 | 1* | 2 | 2* | 3308 |
| 4 | Jason Leffler | 11 | **30** | 6 | 2 | **2*** | 9 | **27** | **4** | 2 | **4** | **5** | **27** | 2 | 2 | 28 | **12*** | 8 | 9 | 5 | 2 | 16 | 3 | 3156 |
| 5 | David Starr | 7 | 6 | 8 | 5 | 5 | 4 | 3 | 7 | 6 | 24 | 8 | 3 | 5 | 34 | 11 | 13 | 3 | 7 | **1** | **11** | 18 | 8 | 3144 |
| 6 | Dennis Setzer | 34 | 11 | 1 | 6 | 7 | 11 | 14 | 5 | 15 | 2 | 2 | 2 | 14 | 13 | 5 | 20 | 10 | 2 | 3 | 8 | 8 | 6 | 3132 |
| 7 | Robert Pressley | 1* | 2 | 14 | 31 | 30 | 2 | 6 | 12 | 7 | 7 | 3 | 9 | 1* | 5 | 9 | 15 | 7 | 24 | 7 | 7 | 14 | 4 | 3097 |
| 8 | Terry Cook | 6 | 29 | 5 | 1* | 4 | 10 | 13 | 2 | **1*** | 6 | 6 | 1 | 6 | **1*** | 7 | 5 | 22 | 25 | 27 | 10 | 5 | 10 | 3070 |
| 9 | Travis Kvapil | 20 | 7 | 7 | 33 | 3 | 19 | 2 | 1* | 10 | 25 | 16 | 7 | 3 | 3 | 30 | 11 | 5 | 5 | 4 | 4 | 4 | 15 | 3039 |
| 10 | Coy Gibbs | 28 | 23 | 21 | 22 | 9 | 6 | 8 | 8 | 3 | 3 | 7 | 6 | 7 | 18 | 12 | 6 | 2 | 4 | 15 | 6 | 6 | 12 | 3010 |
| 11 | Brendan Gaughan **(R)** | 13 | 20 | 9 | 11 | 26 | 7 | 1* | 13 | 4 | 27 | 11 | 5 | 18 | 29 | 6 | 16 | 1 | 11 | 8 | 3 | 13 | 11 | 2893 |
| 12 | Jon Wood | 21 | 9 | 10 | 7 | 12 | 29 | 9 | 11 | 9 | 9 | 13 | 11 | 10 | 8 | 8 | 28 | 12 | 6 | 18 | 13 | 11 | 14 | 2782 |
| 13 | Lance Norick | 10 | 13 | 12 | 9 | 11 | 36 | 10 | 14 | 13 | 22 | 12 | 18 | 8 | 7 | 20 | 22 | 13 | 15 | 11 | 16 | 28 | 21 | 2574 |
| 14 | Bobby Dotter | 36 | 12 | 4 | 15 | 20 | 14 | 17 | 19 | 12 | 15 | 27 | 19 | 28 | 9 | 14 | 9 | 15 | 8 | 16 | 15 | 12 | 20 | 2534 |
| 15 | Matt Crafton | 23 | 14 | 20 | 10 | 29 | 27 | 7 | 21 | 29 | 10 | 17 | 13 | 16 | 10 | 18 | 32 | 23 | 12 | 25 | 17 | 9 | 9 | 2424 |
| 16 | Carlos Contreras | 8 | 17 | 28 | 16 | 13 | 23 | 18 | 15 | 22 | 16 | 22 | 15 | 17 | 31 | 13 | 19 | 30 | 23 | 13 | 18 | 19 | 24 | 2334 |
| 17 | Bill Lester **(R)** | 18 | 28 | 25 | 17 | 15 | 12 | 11 | 17 | 18 | 29 | 14 | 14 | 15 | 28 | 16 | 36 | 28 | 17 | 17 | 14 | 15 | 18 | 2320 |
| 18 | Steve Portenga | 32 | 26 | DNQ | 14 | 8 | 13 | 28 | 27 | 17 | 11 | 10 | 16 | 11 | 23 | 22 | 29 | 25 | 13 | 28 | 26 | 22 | 19 | 2167 |
| 19 | Randy MacDonald | 14 | 19 | 32 | 24 | 24 | 22 | 23 | 20 | 20 | 18 | 23 | 21 | 29 | 14 | 36 | 27 | 17 | 18 | 22 | 20 | 20 | 23 | 2128 |
| 20 | Lance Hooper | 22 | 16 | 16 | 13 | 18 | 16 | 15 | 16 | 30 | 34 | 19 | 29 | 20 | 17 | 19 | 18 | 29 | 16 | 26 | 34 | 36 | 31 | 2121 |
| 21 | Jason Small **(R)** | 9 | 21 | 13 | 21 | 22 | 21 | 25 | 36 | 26 | 30 | 29 | 32 | 19 | 25 | 15 | 24 | 14 | 27 | 10 | 24 | 29 | 22 | 2116 |
| 22 | Brian Rose | 3 | 8 | 27 | 8 | 10 | 30 | 35 | 10 | 19 | 21 | 24 | 25 | 23 | | 25 | 25 | 16 | 22 | 35 | 27 | 23 | 33 | 2110 |
| 23 | Jerry Hill | DNQ | 18 | 22 | 34 | 23 | 18 | 20 | 25 | 21 | 19 | 20 | 20 | 21 | 22 | 29 | 35 | 18 | 19 | 24 | 19 | 25 | 25 | 1992 |
| 24 | Morgan Shepherd | DNQ | 34 | 33 | 36 | 34 | 32 | 31 | 35 | | 32 | DNQ | 30 | | | 35 | 17 | | | 29 | 28 | 33 | 32 | 974 |
| 25 | Stan Boyd | DNQ | | | 32 | 21 | 31 | 16 | | | 35 | 28 | | 25 | | 33 | DNQ | 34 | | 31 | 23 | 24 | 35 | 915 |
| 26 | Tom Powers | 29 | 27 | 30 | 28 | 33 | 20 | 21 | 28 | 23 | 20 | DNQ | | | DNQ | DNQ | | | | DNQ | | | | 853 |
| 27 | Ken Schrader | | 10 | 11 | | | 33 | | | 33 | | | 33 | | | | 10 | | | | | 7 | 30 | 809 |
| 28 | Rich Bickle | | | | | | | | 6 | 11 | 13 | 15 | 12 | 12 | | | | | | | | | | 776 |
| 29 | Eric Jones | | | | | | | | DNQ | 32 | 17 | 30 | | 22 | | 24 | | | | 21 | 22 | 35 | 36 | 750 |
| 30 | Kevin Harvick | | 4 | 29 | | | | | | | | | 8* | | | | 2 | | | | | 1* | | 748 |
| 31 | Phil Bonifield | 35 | DNQ | | DNQ | 35 | DNQ | 34 | 34 | 31 | 31 | 32 | | 33 | | DNQ | | 33 | | | 31 | 34 | DNQ | 704 |
| 32 | Dana White | | | DNQ | 29 | 32 | | | 30 | 25 | | DNQ | 24 | | 24 | 34 | DNQ | | 30 | 34 | | | DNQ | 681 |
| 33 | Carl Edwards | | | | | | | | 23 | 28 | 8 | 18 | | | 19 | | | 24 | | 36 | | | | 676 |
| 34 | Trent Owens **(R)** | DNQ | 15 | 17 | 20 | 14 | 15 | 26 | | | | | | | | | | | | | | | | 657 |
| 35 | Ryan Hemphill | | | | | | | | 26 | 16 | | | | | | | | | 10 | 14 | QL | 26 | 28 | 624 |
| 36 | Michael Dokken | DNQ | 22 | 19 | 19 | | | | | 34 | | 36 | | 36 | | | | 32 | | | 35 | | | 605 |
| 37 | Rodney Sawyers **(R)** | | DNQ | 15 | 18 | 19 | 24 | | 24 | 27 | | DNQ | | | | | | | | | | | | 597 |
| 38 | Andy Houston | | | | | QL | | | | | | | | | | | | | 21 | 12 | 12 | 17 | 17 | 578 |
| 39 | Chris Horn | | | | | 31 | | | | | 14 | 33 | | 30 | | | | | | 30 | 25 | | | 489 |
| 40 | Joe Ruttman | 4 | 35 | | | | | | | | | | | | | 17 | | 11 | | | | | | 465 |
| 41 | Doug Keller | | | | | | | | | | 28 | 21 | | 24 | | | | 27 | | 20 | | | | 455 |
| 42 | Loni Richardson **(R)** | | 36 | 36 | 26 | 36 | DNQ | | DNQ | DNQ | DNQ | DNQ | | | 35 | 27 | DNQ | | | 33 | | DNQ | DNQ | 454 |
| 43 | Aaron Daniel | | | | 27 | | | 19 | DNQ | DNQ | 26 | 25 | | | | | | 21 | | | 29 | | | 431 |
| 44 | Mike Wallace | 30 | | | 35 | | | | | | | | | | 4 | 10 | | | | | | | | 430 |
| 45 | Randy Briggs **(R)** | 26 | | | | | | 32 | | | 23 | 26 | | 26 | | | | | | | | | | 416 |
| 46 | Conrad Burr | | | | | | | | | | | | | 27 | | 26 | DNQ | 26 | 33 | 23 | | | | 410 |
| 47 | Brian Sockwell | 15 | | DNQ | | | | | 22 | | | | | | | | 21 | | 31 | | | | 29 | 391 |
| 48 | Michael Ritch | | | | | 17 | 17 | 24 | 36 | | | | | | | | | | | | | | | 370 |
| 49 | Frog Hall | | | | | | | 30 | DNQ | 35 | DNQ | DNQ | | 34 | | | | 20 | | | 30 | | | 368 |
| 50 | Stacy Compton | | | | | | | | | | | | | | | | 8 | | | | | 32 | 13 | 333 |
| 51 | Angie Wilson **(R)** | | | 23 | 25 | 25 | 34 | | | | | | | | | | | | | | | | | 331 |
| 52 | Tom Carey Jr. | | | | | | 8 | | | 24 | | | 28 | | | | | | | | | | | 312 |
| 53 | Ron Hornaday Jr. | 12 | | | | | | | | | | | | | | | | | | | | | 1 | 307 |
| 54 | Larry Gunselman | 31 | 32 | | 30 | | 25 | | | | | | | | | | | | | | | | | 298 |
| 55 | Teri MacDonald | | | | | | | | 29 | | | | 26 | | 36 | | | | | | | | 34 | 277 |
| 56 | Lonnie Cox | | | | | | | | | | DNQ | DNQ | | | | | | 19 | | 19 | 33 | DNQ | | 276 |
| 57 | Wayne Edwards | | 25 | | | | | 33 | | | 36 | | | | | | | | | | 32 | | | 274 |
| 58 | Ricky Sanders | 19 | DNQ | | | DNQ | | | | | | DNQ | | | | | | | | 32 | 21 | DNQ | | 273 |
| 59 | Barry Bodine | | | | | | | | | | | | | | | | 26 | 31 | | | | | 16 | 270 |
| 60 | Ryan McGlynn | DNQ | 24 | | | | | | | | | | 22 | | | | | | 32 | | | | | 255 |
| 61 | Mike Cofer | | | | | | | | | | | | | | 33 | | | | | | | 21 | 26 | 249 |
| 62 | Darrell Waltrip | | | 34 | | | | | | | | | | | 6 | | | | | | | | | 211 |
| 63 | Bryan Reffner | | | | | | | | | | | 31 | | 13 | | | | | | | | | 27 | 206 |
| 64 | Andy Petree | | | 31 | | | | | | | | | | | 12 | | | | | | | | | 202 |
| 65 | Mark Gibson | | | | | | | | | | | | | | 20 | 23 | | | | | | | | 197 |
| 66 | Bobby Hamilton | | | | | | | | | | | | | | 30 | | 14 | | | | | | | 194 |
| 67 | Blake Mallory | | | | | | | | DNQ | | | | | | 21 | | | | | | | 27 | | 182 |
| 68 | Andy Thurman | | | | | | | | | | | | | | 27 | 21 | | | | | | | | 182 |
| 69 | Tony Stewart | | | | | | | | | | | | | | | | 1 | | | | | | | 180 |
| 70 | Bobby Hamilton Jr. | | | | | | | | | | | | | | | 4 | | | | | | | | 165 |
| 71 | Donnie Neuenberger **(R)** | 25 | | | | | DNQ | 29 | | | | | | | | | | | | | | | | 164 |
| 72 | Rick Carelli | 5 | | | | | | | | | | | | | | | | | | | | | | 160 |
| 73 | Jason White | | | | | | | 22 | | | | 34 | | | | | | | | | | | | 158 |
| 74 | Johnathon Price | | 33 | | | | | | | | | | 23 | | | | | | | | | | | 158 |
| 75 | Brian Ross | | | | | | | | | | | | | | 26 | | 31 | | | | | | | 155 |
| 76 | Regan Smith | | | | | | | | | | | | | | | | | | 29 | | | 30 | | 149 |
| 77 | Chad Chaffin | | | | | | | | 32 | | | | | | | 31 | | | | | | | | 137 |
| 78 | Donny Morelock | | | | | | | | | | 33 | 35 | | | | | | | | | | | | 122 |
| 79 | Matt Mullins | 16 | | | | | | | | | | | | | | | | | | | | | | 115 |
| 80 | Butch Miller | 17 | | | | | | | | | | | | | | | | | | | | | | 112 |
| 81 | Randy Tolsma | | | 18 | | | | | | | | | | | | | | | | | | | | 109 |
| 82 | Adam Clarke | | | | | | | | | | | | | | | | 23 | | 20 | | | | DNQ | 94 |
| 83 | Joe Cooksey | | | | 23 | | | | DNQ | | | | | | | | | | | | | | | 94 |
| 84 | Jeff Finley | | | 26 | | | | | | | | | | | | | | | | | | | | 85 |
| 85 | Tommy Pistone | | | DNQ | | | | | | | | | | | | | DNQ | | 26 | | | | | 85 |
| 86 | Tim Fedewa | 27 | | | | | | | | | | | | | | | | | | | | | | 82 |
| 87 | Jerry Allec Jr. | | | DNQ | | 27 | | | | | | | | | | | | | | DNQ | | | | 82 |
| 88 | Mike Hamby | | | | | 28 | | | | | | | | | | | | | | | | | | 79 |
| 89 | Ronnie Hornaday | | | | | | 28 | | | | | | | | | | | | | | | | | 79 |
| 90 | Clay Collier | | | | | | | | | | | | | | DNQ | | DNQ | | 28 | | | DNQ | | 79 |
| 91 | Carl Long | | | | | | 26 | | | | | | | | | | 30 | | | | | | | 73 |
| 92 | Jamey Caudill | | | | | | | | 31 | | | | | | | | | | 34 | | | | | 70 |
| 93 | J. D. Gibbs | | 31 | | | | | | | | | | | | | | | | | | | | | 70 |
| 94 | Emerson Newton-John | | | | | | | | | | | | 31 | | | | | | | | | | | 70 |
| 95 | Jason Hedlesky | | | | | | | | | | | | | 31 | | | | | | | | | | 70 |
| 96 | Cory Kruseman | | | | | | | | | | | | | | | | | | | | | 31 | DNQ | 70 |
| 97 | Jody McCormick | | | DNQ | | | | | DNQ | | | | | | 32 | | DNQ | | | | | | | 67 |
| 98 | Norm Benning | | | | | | | | | | | | | | | 32 | | | | | | | | 67 |
| 99 | Jody Lavender | | | | | | | | | | | | | | | | 33 | | | | | | | 64 |
| 100 | Bobby Coffey | | | DNQ | | DNQ | DNQ | | DNQ | | | | 34 | | DNQ | | DNQ | | DNQ | | | | | 61 |
| 101 | Scott Kuhn | | | | DNQ | | | | | | | | | | | | 34 | | | | | | | 61 |
| 102 | Richard Landreth | | | 35 | | | | | | | | | | | | | | | | | | | | 58 |
| 103 | Jerry Miller | | | | | | 35 | | | | | | | | | | | | | | | | | 58 |
| 104 | Brian Tyler | | | | | | | | | | | | | 35 | | | | | | | | | | 58 |
| 105 | Patrick Lawler | | | | | | | | | | | | | | | | | 35 | | | | | | 58 |
| 106 | Scott Kirkpatrick | | | | | | | | | | | | | | | | | | 35 | | | | | 58 |
| 107 | Jason Thom | | | | | | | | | 36 | | | | | | | | | | | | | | 55 |
| 108 | Brad Bennett | | | | | | | | | | | | | | | | DNQ | | 36 | | | | | 55 |
| 109 | Rick Bogart | | | | | | | | | | | | | | | | | | | | 36 | | | 55 |
| 110 | Jim Inglebright | DNQ | | | | | | | | | | | | | | | | | | | | | | |
| 111 | Jake Hobgood | DNQ | | | | | | | | | | | | | | | | | | | | | | |
| 112 | Kenny Allen | DNQ | | | | | | | | | | | | | | | | | | | | | | |
| 113 | Ron Barfield Jr. | DNQ | DNQ | | | | | | | | | | | | | | | | | | | | | |
| 114 | Mike Swaim Jr. | DNQ | DNQ | | | | | | | | | | | | | | | | | | | | | |
| 115 | Mike Harmon | | DNQ | | | | | | | | | | | | | | | | | | | | | |
| 116 | L. W. Miller | | | DNQ | | | | | | | | | | | | | | | | | | | | |
| 117 | R. D. Smith | | | DNQ | DNQ | | | | | | | | | | | | | | | | | | | |
| 118 | James Stephenson | | | DNQ | | | | | DNQ | | | | | | | | DNQ | | DNQ | | | | | |
| 119 | Vince Whitmire | | | DNQ | | | | | | | | DNQ | | | | | | | | | | | | |
| 120 | Nathan Wulff | | | | | | | | DNQ | | | | | | | | | | | | | | | |
| 121 | Dude Teate | | | | | | | | | | | | | | DNQ | | | | DNQ | | | | | |
| 122 | Jay Sherston | | | | | | | | | | | | | | DNQ | | | | DNQ | | | | | |
| 123 | Jeremy Thompson | | | | | | | | | | | | | | | | | | DNQ | | | | | |
| 124 | Bobby Hillis Jr. | | | | | | | | | | | | | | | | | | | | DNQ | DNQ | | |
| 125 | John Mickel | | | | | | | | | | | | | | | | | | | | | DNQ | DNQ | |
| 126 | Robby Benton | | | | | | | | | | | | | | | | | | | | | | DNQ | |
| 127 | Mike Leffingwell | | | | QL | | | | | | | | | | | | | | | | | | | |
| Pos | Driver | DAY | DAR | MAR | GTW | PPR | DOV | TEX | MEM | MIL | KAN | KEN | NHA | MCH | IRP | NSH | RCH | TEX | SBO | LVS | CAL | PHO | HOM | Points |

== Rookie of the Year ==
Brendan Gaughan captured two wins and the Rookie of the Year title in 2002, driving for his family-owned Orleans Racing team. Bill Lester came in second followed by Jason Small. Loni Richardson also declared for the award, but did not compete in enough races to be eligible for rookie points.

== See also ==
- 2002 NASCAR Winston Cup Series
- 2002 NASCAR Busch Series
- 2002 ARCA Re/Max Series
- 2002 NASCAR Goody's Dash Series
