= Jason Small (racing driver) =

American racing driver (born 1979)

- Born: June 7, 1979 (age 47); Bakersfield, California, U.S.

NASCAR Cup Series career
- 1 race run over 1 year
- Best finish: 80th (2002)
- First race: 2002 Sirius Satellite Radio 400 (Michigan)
Wins	Top tens	Poles
0	0	0

NASCAR FedEx Freight Truck Series career
- 36 races run over 5 years
- 2004 position: 52nd
- Best finish: 21st (2002)
- First race: 2000 Dodge California 250 (Mesa Marin)
- Last race: 2004 Darlington 200 (Darlington)
Wins	Top tens	Poles
0	3	0
- Statistics up to date as of March 21, 2017.

Jason Small (born June 7, 1979) is an American former stock car racing driver.

== Winston Cup Series ==
Small made his only career NASCAR Cup Series (then called the Winston Cup Series) start in 2002 at Michigan for Price Motorsports. He started 41st and ended up finishing there, after his brakes failed early.

== Craftsman Truck Series ==
Small made his NASCAR Craftsman Truck Series debut in 2000, running at Mesa Marin. That race he started 20th in the truck owned by Walker Evans, but struggled to a 28th-place finish. He then switched to Green Light Racing, where he competed one race for the team at O'Reilly Raceway Park with a 25th place result.

Small started three races then for Sonntag Racing in 2001. His best run for the team came in his debut with them, where he started nineteenth and finished 25th at Homestead-Miami. Small then moved onto a family owned team for two late races in the year. He earned his then best career run at Phoenix, when he came home 19th.

Small reunited with Green Light Racing in 2002 and his runs with the team earned him 21st in the points as he competed in all the races. Immediately, Small started out with a ninth place in the season opener at Daytona. Small, though, would only earn one more top-ten on the year: a tenth at Las Vegas. Small's meager 22nd in points could largely be blamed to inconsistency. Small did not finish seven races. At one point, he did not even finish six consecutive races. Such inconsistency led to Small's release at the end of the season.

Small did not go away, however, and once again he restarted his family team for three 2003 races. After a 21st place season debut, Small earned his third career top-ten: a tenth at California. A 23rd place finish at Phoenix would be his last start of the year.

Small was called upon in mid-2004 to drive the No. 13 ThorSport Racing Chevy in place of Tina Gordon. Small did his fill-in role decently, earning a best finish of 21st at Darlington. However, the ride did not convert into any more races and Small has not raced in NASCAR since.

== Motorsports career results ==
=== NASCAR ===
(key) (Bold – Pole position awarded by qualifying time. Italics – Pole position earned by points standings or practice time. * – Most laps led.)

==== Winston Cup Series ====
NASCAR Winston Cup Series results
Year	Team	No.	Make	1	2	3	4	5	6	7	8	9	10	11	12	13	14	15	16	17	18	19	20	21	22	23	24	25	26	27	28	29	30	31	32	33	34	35	36	NWCC	Pts	Ref
2002	Price Motorsports	59	Dodge	DAY	CAR	LVS	ATL	DAR	BRI	TEX	MAR	TAL	CAL	RCH	CLT	DOV	POC	MCH; 41	SON	DAY	CHI	NHA	POC	IND	GLN	MCH	BRI	DAR	RCH	NHA	DOV	KAN	TAL	CLT	MAR	ATL	CAR	PHO	HOM	80th	40	

==== Craftsman Truck Series ====
NASCAR Craftsman Truck Series results
Year	Team	No.	Make	1	2	3	4	5	6	7	8	9	10	11	12	13	14	15	16	17	18	19	20	21	22	23	24	25	NCTC	Pts	Ref
2000	Walker Evans Racing	20	Chevy	DAY	HOM	PHO	MMR; 28	MAR	PIR	GTY	MEM	PPR	EVG	TEX	KEN	GLN	MLW	NHA	NZH	MCH									102nd	79	
2000	Green Light Racing	45	Chevy																		IRP; 25	NSV	CIC	RCH	DOV	TEX	CAL		102nd	79	
2001	Tagsby Racing	73	Chevy	DAY; DNQ	HOM; 25	MMR; 33	MAR; 28	GTY	DAR	PPR	DOV	TEX	MEM	MLW															53rd	444	
2001	Ken Small	74	Chevy												KAN; 29	KEN	NHA	IRP	NSH	CIC	NZH	RCH	SBO	TEX	LVS	PHO; 24	CAL		53rd	444	
2002	Green Light Racing	07	Chevy	DAY; 9	DAR; 21	MAR; 13	GTY; 21	PPR; 22	DOV; 21	TEX; 25	MEM; 33	MLW; 26	KAN; 30	KEN; 29	NHA; 32	MCH; 19	IRP; 25	NSH; 15	RCH; 24	TEX; 14	SBO; 27	LVS; 10	CAL; 24	PHO; 29	HOM; 22				21st	2116	
2003	JRS Motorsports	39	Chevy	DAY	DAR	MMR; 21	MAR	CLT	DOV	TEX	MEM	MLW	KAN	KEN	GTW	MCH	IRP	NSH	BRI	RCH	NHA	CAL; 10	LVS; DNQ	SBO	TEX	MAR	PHO; 23	HOM	64th	328	
2004	ThorSport Racing	13	Chevy	DAY	ATL	MAR	MFD	CLT	DOV	TEX	MEM	MLW	KAN	KEN	GTW	MCH	IRP	NSH	BRI	RCH	NHA	LVS	CAL; 22	TEX; 33	MAR	PHO	DAR; 21	HOM; 31	52nd	331	
