= Bobby Dotter =

American racing driver (born 1960)

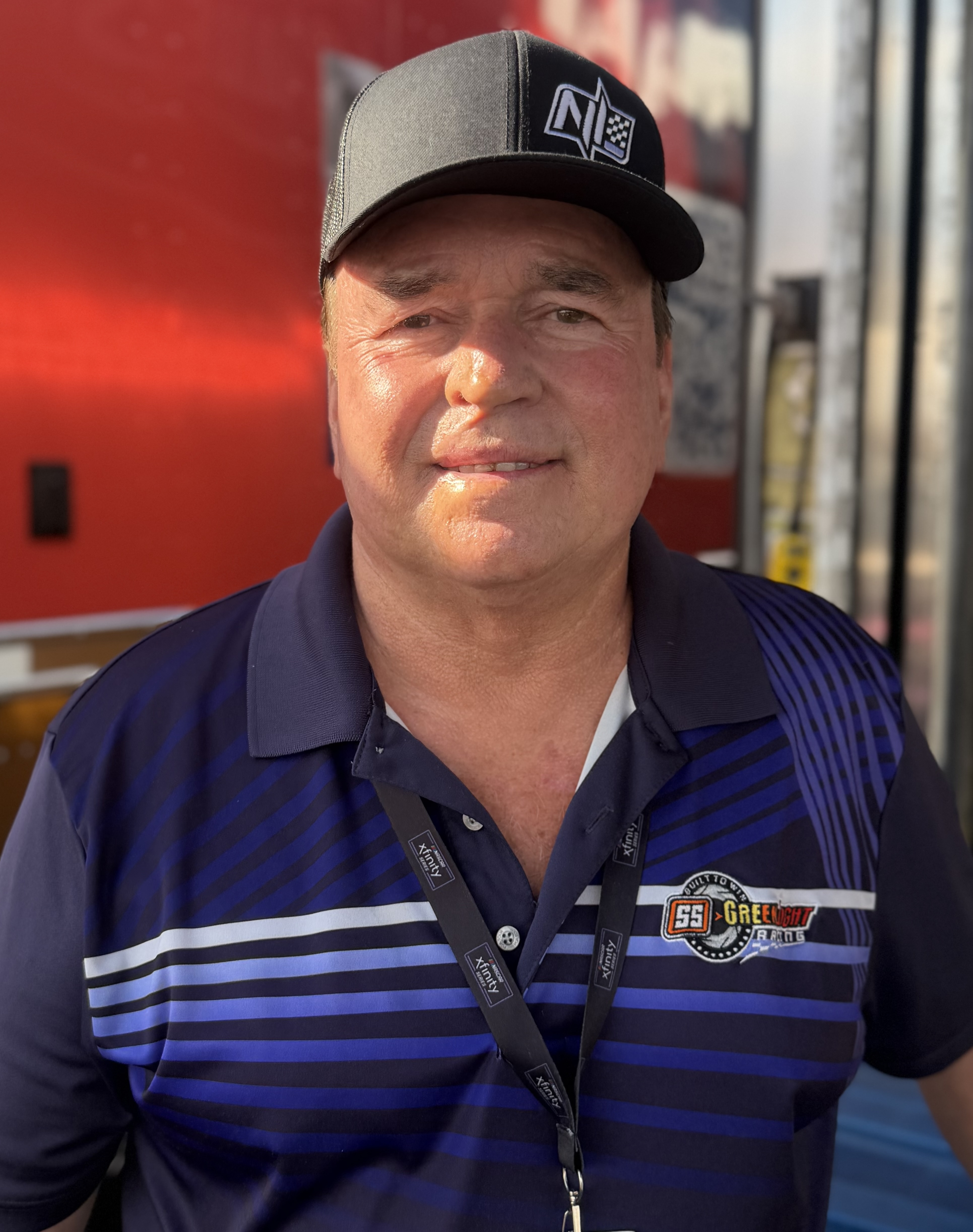
- Dotter in 2025
- Born: Robert Dotter; July 11, 1960 (age 66); Chicago, Illinois, U.S.
- Awards: 2000 NASCAR Winston West Series Most Popular Driver

NASCAR O'Reilly Auto Parts Series career
- 209 races run over 13 years
- Best finish: 7th (1993, 1994)
- First race: 1988 Mountain Dew 400 (Hickory)
- Last race: 2004 Alan Kulwicki 250 (Milwaukee)
- First win: 1992 Granger Select 200 (Dublin)
Wins	Top tens	Poles
1	42	4

NASCAR FedEx Freight Truck Series career
- 73 races run over 10 years
- Best finish: 14th (2002)
- First race: 1996 GM Goodwrench / AC Delco 300 (Phoenix)
- Last race: 2008 Camping World RV Rental 200 (Loudon)
Wins	Top tens	Poles
0	5	0
- Statistics up to date as of November 28, 2012.

Bobby Dotter (born July 11, 1960) is an American former professional stock car racing driver. His father, Bob Dotter, is a three-time champion of the Automobile Racing Club of America. Dotter has made 209 starts in the NASCAR Busch Series, posting 42 top-tens and four poles. In 2000, Dotter began running in the NASCAR West Series for Gene Christensen, winning four races and the Most Popular Driver Title. He finished second in points.

Dotter is also a veteran of the NASCAR Craftsman Truck Series. He has seventy-three starts and five top-tens. He currently owns SS-Green Light Racing.

== Racing career ==
Dotter got his start racing as a sixteen-year-old in 1977 driving one of his dad's late model cars at tracks like Waukegan Speedway and Raceway Park (Blue Island, Illinois). Success came instantly with numerous wins, including seventeen feature wins at Raceway Park during his rookie season.

In 1992, Dotter won a Busch Series race at New River Valley Speedway after Jeff Burton was stripped of his win for a non-compliant part. He has also won races in the ASA series, All Pro series, and All American Challenge series. Dotter was involved in a crash at the Daytona International Speedway during the ARCA race in 1989. While driving his father's race car, he suffered a flat tire, and the car hit the wall and caught fire. Bobby climbed onto the roof of the race car while still at speed to avoid the flames. He rode on the roof until the car slowed enough that he could jump off. He suffered second and third degree burns to his face and arms.

== Motorsports career results ==
=== NASCAR ===
(key) (Bold – Pole position awarded by qualifying time. Italics – Pole position earned by points standings or practice time. * – Most laps led.)

==== Busch Series ====
NASCAR Busch Series results
Year	Team	No.	Make	1	2	3	4	5	6	7	8	9	10	11	12	13	14	15	16	17	18	19	20	21	22	23	24	25	26	27	28	29	30	31	32	33	34	NBSC	Pts	Ref
1988	Bob Dotter Racing	79	Buick	DAY; DNQ	HCY; 13	CAR; 21	MAR; 24	DAR	BRI; 24	LNG; 19	NZH; 21	SBO; 24	NSV; 24	CLT	DOV	ROU; 17	LAN	**LVL**; 24	MYB; 17	OXF	SBO	HCY; 6	LNG	IRP; 6	ROU	BRI; 16	DAR	RCH	DOV	MAR; 29	CLT	CAR	MAR					27th	1600	
1989	Team R Racing	08	Buick	DAY	CAR	MAR	HCY	DAR	BRI	NZH	SBO	LAN	NSV	CLT	DOV	ROU	LVL	VOL	MYB	SBO	HCY	DUB	IRP	ROU	BRI	DAR	RCH	DOV	MAR	CLT	CAR	MAR; 9						101st	0	
1990	Team R Racing	08	Buick	DAY; DNQ	RCH; 19	CAR; 22	MAR; 6	HCY; 22	DAR; 24	BRI; 22	LAN; 8	SBO; 17	NZH; 13	HCY; 13	CLT	DOV; 18	ROU; 16	VOL; 9	MYB; 4	OXF; 14	NHA; 9	SBO; 13		IRP; 21			DAR; 29	RCH; 28	DOV; 17		CLT; 39	NHA; 7	CAR; 23					14th	3351	
1990	Beard Motorsports	00	Olds																				DUB; 16															14th	3351	
1990	Team R Racing	08	Olds																						ROU; 7	BRI; 13				MAR; 9				MAR; 11				14th	3351	
1991	Team R Racing	08	Buick	DAY; 18	RCH; 23	CAR; 19	MAR; 20	VOL; 15	HCY; 9	DAR; 15	BRI; 15	LAN; 25	SBO; 4	NZH; 20	CLT; 21	DOV; 22	ROU; 18	HCY; 9	MYB; 16	GLN; 12	OXF; 5	NHA; 29	SBO; 24		IRP; 11	ROU; 19	BRI; 29	DAR; 18	RCH; 28	DOV; 24	CLT; 36	NHA; 14	CAR; 30	MAR; 17				14th	3327	
1991	Shoemaker Racing	64	Pontiac																					DUB; 17														14th	3327	
1992	Team R Racing	08	Buick	DAY; DNQ		RCH; 21	ATL; 29	MAR; 11									ROU; 15		GLN; 16					ROU; 11	MCH	NHA; 41	BRI; 16							HCY; 23				16th	2961	
1992	Team R Racing	08	Olds		CAR; 33				DAR; 18	BRI; 3	HCY; 19	LAN; 12	DUB; 1	NZH; 15		DOV; 24		MYB; 20		VOL; 13	NHA; 15	TAL; 34	IRP; 9					DAR; 33	RCH; 28			MAR; 9	CAR; 29					16th	2961	
1992	Day Enterprises	16	Chevy												CLT; 32																							16th	2961	
1992	Shoemaker Racing	64	Pontiac																											DOV; 16	CLT; DNQ							16th	2961	
1993	Team R Racing	08	Chevy	DAY; 25		RCH; 14			HCY; 11	ROU; 9	MAR; 17	NZH; 13	CLT; 21		MYB; 18		**MLW**; 14	TAL; 11	IRP; 23	MCH; 21	NHA; 3	BRI; 3		RCH; 6	DOV; 14	ROU; 5	**CLT**; 9	MAR; 13	CAR; 11	HCY; 6	ATL; 37							7th	3406	
1993	Team R Racing	08	Olds		CAR; 15		DAR; 38	BRI; 12						DOV; 12		GLN; 9							DAR; 11															7th	3406	
1994	Team R Racing	08	Chevy	DAY; 13	CAR; 11	RCH; 27	ATL; 15	MAR; 17	DAR; 23	HCY; 15	BRI; 16	ROU; 10	NHA; 2	NZH; 6	CLT; 14	DOV; 36	MYB; 7	GLN; 2	MLW; 19	SBO; 11	TAL; 25	HCY; 9	IRP; 10	MCH; 26	BRI; 16	DAR; 18	RCH; 12	DOV; 31	CLT; 23	MAR; 7	CAR; 15							7th	3299	
1995	Dotter Racing	08	Chevy	DAY; 15	CAR; 39	RCH; 8	ATL; 23	NSV; 17	DAR; 25	BRI; 17	HCY; 5	NHA; 28	NZH; 6	CLT; 33	DOV; 32	MYB; 5	GLN; 12	MLW; 12	TAL; 24		IRP; 7	MCH; 23	BRI; 11	DAR; 12	RCH; DNQ	DOV; 33	**CLT**; 32	CAR; 32	HOM; 33									14th	2636	
1995	Shoemaker Racing	64	Chevy																	SBO; 6																		14th	2636	
1996	Shoemaker Racing	64	Chevy	DAY; 14	CAR; DNQ	RCH; DNQ																																24th	1832	
1996	Dotter Racing	08	Chevy				ATL; DNQ				HCY; 13																											24th	1832	
1996	D-R Racing	55	Chevy					NSV; 10				NZH; 18			SBO; 17	MYB; 33	GLN	MLW; 17	NHA; 14	TAL; 19	IRP; 31	MCH; 39	BRI; 18	DAR; 43	RCH; 29	DOV; 35	CLT	CAR	HOM									24th	1832	
1996	D-R Racing	55	Ford						DAR; 24	BRI; 18																												24th	1832	
1996	Ken Schrader Racing	52	Chevy										CLT; 18	DOV; 12																								24th	1832	
1997	Dotter Racing	08	Chevy	DAY	CAR	RCH	ATL	LVS	DAR	HCY	TEX	BRI	NSV	TAL	NHA	NZH	CLT	DOV	SBO	GLN	MLW; 23	MYB	GTY	IRP	MCH	BRI	DAR	RCH	DOV	CLT	CAL	CAR	HOM					91st	94	
1998	Dotter Racing	08	Chevy	DAY	CAR	LVS	NSV	DAR	BRI	TEX	HCY	TAL	NHA; 25	NZH	CLT	DOV	RCH	PPR	GLN	MLW; 15	MYB	CAL	SBO	IRP	MCH	BRI	DAR	RCH	DOV	CLT	GTY	CAR	ATL	HOM				75th	206	
1999	Dotter Racing	08	Chevy	DAY	CAR	LVS	ATL	DAR	TEX	NSV	BRI	TAL	CAL	NHA; DNQ	RCH	NZH	CLT	DOV	SBO	GLN	MLW; DNQ	MYB	PPR	GTY	IRP	MCH	BRI	DAR	RCH	DOV	CLT	CAR	MEM	PHO	HOM			NA	-	
2001	PF2 Motorsports	94	Chevy	DAY	CAR	LVS	ATL	DAR	BRI	TEX	NSH	TAL	CAL	RCH	NHA	NZH	CLT	DOV	KEN	MLW	GLN	CHI	GTY	PPR	IRP	MCH	BRI	DAR	RCH	DOV	KAN	CLT	MEM	PHO; 27	CAR	HOM		113th	82	
2004	Ware Racing Enterprises	51	Chevy	DAY	CAR	LVS	DAR	BRI	TEX	NSH	TAL	CAL	GTY	RCH	NZH	CLT	DOV	NSH	KEN	MLW; 26	DAY	CHI	NHA	PPR	IRP	MCH	BRI	CAL	RCH	DOV	KAN	CLT	MEM	ATL	PHO	DAR	HOM	125th	85	

==== Craftsman Truck Series ====
NASCAR Craftsman Truck Series results
Year	Team	No.	Make	1	2	3	4	5	6	7	8	9	10	11	12	13	14	15	16	17	18	19	20	21	22	23	24	25	26	27	NCTC	Pts	Ref
1996	Wegner Racing	68	Chevy	HOM	PHO	POR	EVG	TUS	CNS	HPT	BRI	NZH	MLW	LVL	I70	IRP	FLM	GLN	NSV	RCH	NHA	MAR	NWS	SON	MMR	PHO; 20	LVS; DNQ				95th	131	
1997	Wegner Racing	68	Chevy	WDW; 16	TUS; 23	HOM; DNQ	PHO; 31	POR	EVG	I70	NHA; 16	TEX	BRI	NZH						FLM; 27	NSV	GLN	RCH	MAR	SON	MMR	CAL	PHO; 23	LVS		37th	677	
1997	TKO Motorsports	60	Chevy												MLW; 24	LVL	CNS	HPT	IRP												37th	677	
1998	Potashnick Racing	08	Chevy	WDW	HOM	PHO	POR	EVG	I70	GLN	TEX	BRI	MLW	NZH	CAL	PPR	IRP	NHA	FLM	NSV	HPT	LVL	RCH	MEM	GTY	MAR	SON	MMR	PHO; 19	LVS	91st	106	
2000	Green Light Racing	45	Chevy	DAY	HOM	PHO	MMR	MAR	PIR	GTY	MEM	PPR	EVG	TEX	KEN	GLN	MLW; 17	NHA	NZH	MCH	IRP	NSV; 31	CIC	RCH	DOV	TEX; DNQ	CAL				72nd	231	
2001	Green Light Racing	08	Chevy	DAY; 14	HOM; 21	MMR; 17	MAR; 33	GTY; 24	DAR; 16	PPR; 15	DOV; 15	TEX; 23	MEM; 18	MLW; 27	KAN; 25	KEN; 26	NHA; 20	IRP; 10	NSH; 18	CIC; 13	NZH; 25	RCH; 15	SBO; 11	TEX; 15	LVS; 19	PHO; 27	CAL; 15				15th	2537	
2002	Green Light Racing	08	Chevy	DAY; 36	DAR; 12	MAR; 4	GTY; 15		DOV; 14	TEX; 17	MEM; 19	MLW; 12	KAN; 15	KEN; 27	NHA; 19	MCH; 28	IRP; 9	NSH; 14	RCH; 9	TEX; 15	SBO; 8	LVS; 16	CAL; 15	PHO; 12	HOM; 20						14th	2534	
2002	Green Light Racing	08	Dodge					PPR; 20																							14th	2534	
2003	Green Light Racing	08	Chevy	DAY; 11																		CAL; 22									29th	939	
2003	Green Light Racing	07	Chevy		DAR; 32	MMR; 25	MAR; 34	CLT	DOV	TEX	MEM	MLW; 30	KAN; DNQ	KEN	GTW	MCH	IRP	NSH	BRI	RCH	NHA; 29		LVS; 17	SBO; 11	TEX	MAR	PHO; 21	HOM			29th	939	
2004	Ken Weaver Racing	20	Chevy	DAY	ATL	MAR	MFD	CLT	DOV	TEX	MEM	MLW	KAN; 34	KEN	GTW	MCH	IRP	NSH	BRI	RCH											75th	146	
2004	Green Light Racing	08	Chevy																		NHA; 26	LVS	CAL; 34	TEX	MAR	PHO	DAR	HOM			75th	146	
2007	Green Light Racing	06	Chevy	DAY	CAL	ATL	MAR	KAN	CLT	MFD	DOV	TEX	MCH	MLW	MEM; 35	KEN	IRP	NSH	BRI	GTW	NHA	LVS; 35	TAL	MAR	ATL	TEX	PHO	HOM			118th	0	
2008	SS-Green Light Racing	08	Dodge	DAY	CAL	ATL	MAR	KAN	CLT	MFD	DOV	TEX	MCH	MLW	MEM	KEN	IRP	NSH	BRI	GTW	NHA; 30	LVS	TAL	MAR	ATL	TEX	PHO	HOM			95th	73	

=== ARCA Re/Max Series ===
(key) (Bold – Pole position awarded by qualifying time. Italics – Pole position earned by points standings or practice time. * – Most laps led.)

ARCA Re/Max Series results
Year	Team	No.	Make	1	2	3	4	5	6	7	8	9	10	11	12	13	14	15	16	17	18	19	20	21	22	23	ARMC	Pts	Ref
1981	Hahnlein Racing	7	Buick	DAY; 37	DSP	FRS	FRS	BFS	TAL	FRS	COR																NA	-	
1983	Pennington Racing	89	Chevy	DAY	NSV	TAL	LPR	LPR	ISF	IRP	SSP	FRS	BFS	WIN	LPR; 19												NA	-	
1983	Goudie Racing	83	Dodge													POC; 5	TAL	MCS	FRS	MIL	DSF	ZAN					NA	-	
1983	Goudie Racing	83	Pontiac																				SND; 7				NA	-	
1984	Fortier Racing	40	Buick	DAY; 34	ATL; 30	TAL	CSP																				NA	-	
1984		19	Chevy					SMS; 15*	FRS	MCS	LCS	IRP	TAL	FRS													NA	-	
1984	Hahnlein Racing	76	Olds												ISF; 24	DSF; DNQ	TOL	MGR									NA	-	
1985	Hahnlein Racing	76	Olds	ATL; 15	DAY	ATL	TAL	ATL	SSP	IRP	CSP	FRS	IRP	OEF	ISF	DSF											81st	-	
1985			Pontiac														TOL; 9										81st	-	
1986		40	Chevy	ATL; 25																							48th	-	
1986	Gail Marmor	50	Chevy		DAY; 6																						48th	-	
1986			Chevy			ATL; 31	TAL	SIR	SSP	FRS	KIL	CSP	TAL	BLN	ISF	DSF	TOL	MCS	ATL								48th	-	
1987	Gunderman Racing	79	Ford	DAY; 7	ATL	TAL	DEL	ACS	TOL	ROC	POC	FRS	KIL	TAL	FRS	ISF	INF	DSF	SLM								63rd	-	
1987	Gunderman Racing	79	Pontiac																	ATL; 33							63rd	-	
1988	Churchill Motorsports	61	Olds	DAY	ATL	TAL	FRS	PCS	ROC	POC	WIN	KIL	ACS	SLM	POC	TAL; 42	DEL	FRS	ISF	DSF	SLM	ATL					101st	-	
1992	Dotter & Davis Racing	18	Chevy	DAY	FIF	TWS	TAL	TOL	KIL	POC	MCH	FRS	KIL	NSH	DEL	POC	HPT	FRS	ISF	TOL	DSF	TWS	SLM; 32	ATL			121st	-	
1995	Fast Track Racing	01	Olds	DAY	ATL	TAL	FIF	KIL	FRS	MCH	I80	MCS	FRS	POC	POC	KIL	FRS	SBS	LVL	ISF	DSF	SLM; 32	WIN	ATL			111th	-	
1998	Potashnick Racing	65	Chevy	DAY	ATL	SLM	CLT	MEM	MCH	POC	SBS	TOL	PPR; 6	POC	KIL	FRS	ISF	ATL	DSF	SLM	TEX	WIN	CLT	TAL; 15	ATL		NA	0	
1999	Roulo Brothers Racing	39	Ford	DAY	ATL	SLM	AND	CLT	MCH	POC	TOL	SBS	BLN	POC	KIL; 19	FRS; 4	FLM	ISF	WIN	DSF	SLM	CLT	TAL	ATL			68th	355	
2000	Henriksen Racing	71	Chevy	DAY	SLM	AND	CLT	KIL; 7	FRS; 4	MCH	POC	TOL	KEN	BLN	POC	WIN	ISF	KEN	DSF	SLM	CLT	TAL	ATL				58th	415	
2005	Fast Track Racing	10	Chevy	DAY	NSH	SLM	KEN	TOL	LAN	MIL	POC	MCH	KAN	KEN	BLN	POC	GTW	LER	NSH	MCH	ISF	TOL; 24	DSF	CHI	SLM	TAL	145th	110	
