= Cameron Dodson =

American racing driver (1988–2021)

- Born: July 28, 1988; Greenfield, Indiana, U.S.
- Died: December 19, 2021 (aged 33)
- Achievements: 2007 USAC Silver Crown Rookie of the Year

NASCAR FedEx Freight Truck Series career
- 4 races run over 1 year
- 2006 position: 51st
- Best finish: 51st (2006)
- First race: 2006 Power Stroke Diesel 200 (IRP)
- Last race: 2006 Casino Arizona 150 (Phoenix)
| Wins | Top tens | Poles |
|---|---|---|
| 0 | 0 | 0 |

Cameron Dodson (July 28, 1988 – December 19, 2021) was an American professional USAC Silver Crown and stock car racing driver. Dodson won the 2007 USAC Silver Crown Rookie of the Year award, and competed in four Truck races in 2006. He last competed part-time in the NASCAR Craftsman Truck Series, driving the No. 63 for MB Motorsports.

On December 19, 2021, Dodson was hit by a motorist while crossing the street and died instantly.

== Motorsports career results ==
=== NASCAR ===
(key) (Bold – Pole position awarded by qualifying time. Italics – Pole position earned by points standings or practice time. * – Most laps led.)

==== Craftsman Truck Series ====
NASCAR Craftsman Truck Series results
| Year | Team | No. | Make | 1 | 2 | 3 | 4 | 5 | 6 | 7 | 8 | 9 | 10 | 11 | 12 | 13 | 14 | 15 | 16 | 17 | 18 | 19 | 20 | 21 | 22 | 23 | 24 | 25 | NCTC | Pts | Ref |
|---|---|---|---|---|---|---|---|---|---|---|---|---|---|---|---|---|---|---|---|---|---|---|---|---|---|---|---|---|---|---|---|
| 2006 | MB Motorsports | 63 | Ford | DAY | CAL | ATL | MAR | GTY | CLT | MFD | DOV | TEX | MCH | MLW | KAN | KEN | MEM | IRP; 29 | NSH | BRI | NHA; 24 | LVS | TAL | MAR; 30 | ATL | TEX | PHO; 30 | HOM | 51st | 313 | |
