= J. R. Patton =

American racing driver (born 1983)

- Born: September 12, 1983 (age 43); Las Cruces, New Mexico, U.S.
- Awards: 2003 NASCAR Featherlite Southwest Tour Rookie of the Year

NASCAR FedEx Freight Truck Series career
- 7 races run over 1 year
- Best finish: 35th (2004)
- First race: 2004 Las Vegas 350 (Las Vegas)
- Last race: 2004 Ford 200 (Homestead)
Wins	Top tens	Poles
0	0	0
- Statistics up to date as of March 26, 2014.

J. R. Patton (born September 12, 1983) is an American professional stock car racing driver. He has competed in NASCAR competition in the Featherlite Southwest Tour and the Craftsman Truck Series.

== Career ==
Educated at New Mexico State University, where he majored in business marketing, and a member of the Zia people, Patton won the Rookie of the Year award in 2003 in the NASCAR Featherlite Southwest Tour.

Patton made seven starts late in the 2004 NASCAR Craftsman Truck Series season for Fiddleback Racing. In his debut, Patton ran a second Fiddleback truck, the No. 66, to a 15th-place finish at Las Vegas Motor Speedway. Patton drove for the rest of 2004, but the 15th at Vegas would prove to be Patton's best. He also finished all but one of his starts.

In 2006, MB Motorsports announced Patton would drive their No. 63 Ford for a limited schedule, running for Rookie of the Year. Despite four attempts, Patton missed every race he tried to make.

== Motorsports career results ==
=== NASCAR ===
(key) (Bold - Pole position awarded by qualifying time. Italics - Pole position earned by points standings or practice time. * – Most laps led.)

==== Craftsman Truck Series ====
NASCAR Craftsman Truck Series results
Year	Team	No.	Make	1	2	3	4	5	6	7	8	9	10	11	12	13	14	15	16	17	18	19	20	21	22	23	24	25	NCTC	Pts	Ref
2004	Fiddleback Racing	66	Ford	DAY	ATL	MAR	MFD	CLT	DOV	TEX	MEM	MLW	KAN	KEN	GTW	MCH	IRP	NSH	BRI	RCH	NHA	LVS; 15							35th	637	
2004	Fiddleback Racing	67	Ford																				CAL; 26	TEX; 31	MAR; 18	PHO; 25	DAR; 31	HOM; 22	35th	637	
2005	MB Motorsports	63	Ford	DAY; DNQ	CAL	ATL	MAR	GTY	MFD	CLT	DOV	TEX	MCH	MLW	KAN	KEN	MEM	IRP	NSH	BRI	RCH	NHA	LVS	MAR	ATL	TEX	PHO	HOM	N/A	0	
2006	MB Motorsports	63	Ford	DAY; DNQ	CAL	ATL	MAR	GTY; DNQ	CLT; DNQ	MFD	DOV	TEX; DNQ	MCH	MLW	KAN	KEN	MEM	IRP	NSH	BRI	NHA	LVS	TAL	MAR	ATL	TEX	PHO	HOM	N/A	0	

==== West Series ====
NASCAR West Series results
Year	Team	No.	Make	1	2	3	4	5	6	7	8	9	10	11	12	13	NWSC	Pts	Ref
2004	Midgley Motorsports	09	Pontiac	PHO	MMR	CAL; 12	S99	EVG	IRW	S99	RMR	DCS	PHO	CNS	MMR	IRW	56th	127	

=== ARCA Re/Max Series ===
(key) (Bold – Pole position awarded by qualifying time. Italics – Pole position earned by points standings or practice time. * – Most laps led.)

ARCA Re/Max Series results
Year	Team	No.	Make	1	2	3	4	5	6	7	8	9	10	11	12	13	14	15	16	17	18	19	20	21	22	23	ARMC	Pts	Ref
2005	Mike Buckley Racing	28	Chevy	DAY; DNQ	NSH	SLM	KEN	TOL	LAN	MIL	POC	MCH	KAN	KEN	BLN	POC	GTW	LER	NSH	MCH	ISF	TOL	DSF	CHI	SLM	TAL	N/A	0	
