= Bill Lester =

American racing driver

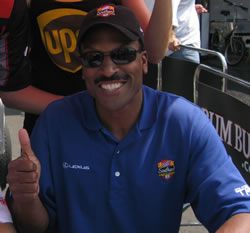
- Lester in 2008
- Born: William Alexander Lester III; February 6, 1961 (age 65); Washington, D.C., U.S.
- Achievements: First African-American to win a Rolex Sports Car Series race (Virginia International Raceway, 2011, GT Class)

NASCAR Cup Series career
- 2 races run over 1 year
- Best finish: 68th (2006)
- First race: 2006 Golden Corral 500 (Atlanta)
- Last race: 2006 3M Performance 400 (Michigan)
Wins	Top tens	Poles
0	0	0

NASCAR O'Reilly Auto Parts Series career
- 1 race run over 1 year
- Best finish: 111th (1999)
- First race: 1999 Lysol 200 (Watkins Glen)
Wins	Top tens	Poles
0	0	0

NASCAR FedEx Freight Truck Series career
- 143 races run over 9 years
- 2021 position: 89th
- Best finish: 13th (2003)
- First race: 2000 Line-X 225 (Portland)
- Last race: 2021 Fr8Auctions 200 (Atlanta)
Wins	Top tens	Poles
0	7	3

Rolex Sports Car Series
- Years active: 1998–2001, 2007–2012
- Starts: 52
- Wins: 1
- Poles: 2
- Best finish: 3rd in 2011
- Statistics up to date as of December 30, 2021.

William Alexander Lester III (born February 6, 1961) is an American semi-retired professional racing driver. He last competed part-time in the NASCAR Camping World Truck Series, driving the No. 17 Ford F-150 for David Gilliland Racing. Lester previously competed full-time in the Truck Series from 2002 to midway through 2007. Lester was the NASCAR's only full-time African-American driver during that time. After that, he moved to sports car racing, competing in the Rolex Sports Car Series from 2007 to 2012. Lester had also competed part-time in the same series from 1998 to 2001.

Lester also made two NASCAR Cup Series starts in 2006 and one Busch Series (now Xfinity) start in 1999.

Since his retirement from driving, Lester has worked as a member of the NASCAR National Motorsports Appeals Panel.

== Racing career ==
=== Early career ===
Lester began racing in the road course circuits, running in the SCCA and IMSA series. He made his IMSA debut in 1990 at Sears Point International Raceway, qualifying ninth and finishing first in a Chevrolet Camaro. He also picked up a victory that year in an endurance race at Sears Point. In 1990, he began running the SCCA, running an unsponsored Oldsmobile Cutlass for Rocketsports at Portland, and one race for Tom Gloy at Mid-Ohio. He did not race professionally again until 1996, running SCCA events at Watkins Glen, Elkhart Lake, Wisconsin, Sears Point, and Reno, Nevada. He competed in the 24 Hours of Daytona in 1998 and 1999, finishing fifth and tenth, respectively.

=== NASCAR ===
In 1999, Lester became the first African-American to run a Busch Series race, when he ran at Watkins Glen in the No. 8 Dura Lube Chevrolet Monte Carlo owned by Bobby Hillin Jr. He started 24th and ran near a top-ten most of the day before an accident relegated him back to 21st. The next season, he made his Craftsman Truck debut at Portland, starting 31st and finishing 24th in the No. 23 Red Line Oil truck owned by Team 23 Racing. He also competed against Bobby Norfleet in that race, marking the first time in NASCAR two African-Americans competed in the same race. He ran five races the next season in the No. 4 for Bobby Hamilton Racing, his best finish an eighteenth at Phoenix International Raceway.

In 2002, Lester ran in the Craftsman Truck series full-time for Hamilton. While he did not finish in the top-ten, he had sixteen finishes between eleventh-eighteenth, leading to a seventeenth place points finish and runner-up to Brendan Gaughan for NASCAR Craftsman Truck Series Rookie of the Year. The next season, he grabbed his first career pole at Lowe's Motor Speedway and had a tenth-place run at Kansas Speedway, garnering a fourteenth place finish in the championship standings.

Lester switched over to Bill Davis Racing in 2004. He had a best finish of tenth and finished 22nd in points. In 2005, he won two consecutive poles, and had his first top-five finishes. Lester raced in his first Nextel Cup race in the Golden Corral 500 at Atlanta Motor Speedway, driving the No. 23 Waste Management Dodge Charger for Davis in 2006. The race was supposed to be run on March 19, but was postponed for a day due to rain. He qualified nineteenth, becoming the first African-American to make a Cup race since 1986, and the sixth in series history. He finished 38th, six laps down. He ran another race that season at Michigan, finishing 32nd. He later DNQed at California after spinning in qualifying.

After failing to finish in the top-ten in 2006, Lester departed Davis to drive the No. 15 Billy Ballew Motorsports Chevy. His best finish was an eighth at Kentucky, when he stepped out of the truck due to sponsor problems. After he was unable to find another ride in NASCAR, he left in 2008 to return to sports car racing.

On February 26, 2021, Lester announced on NASCAR Race Hub that he would be coming out of retirement to compete in the Truck Series race at his home track of Atlanta, which was also the same track where he made his Cup Series debut at in 2006. The team was revealed as David Gilliland Racing on March 12, with local Ford dealerships and Camping World as his sponsors. He finished 36th.

=== Return to sports cars ===
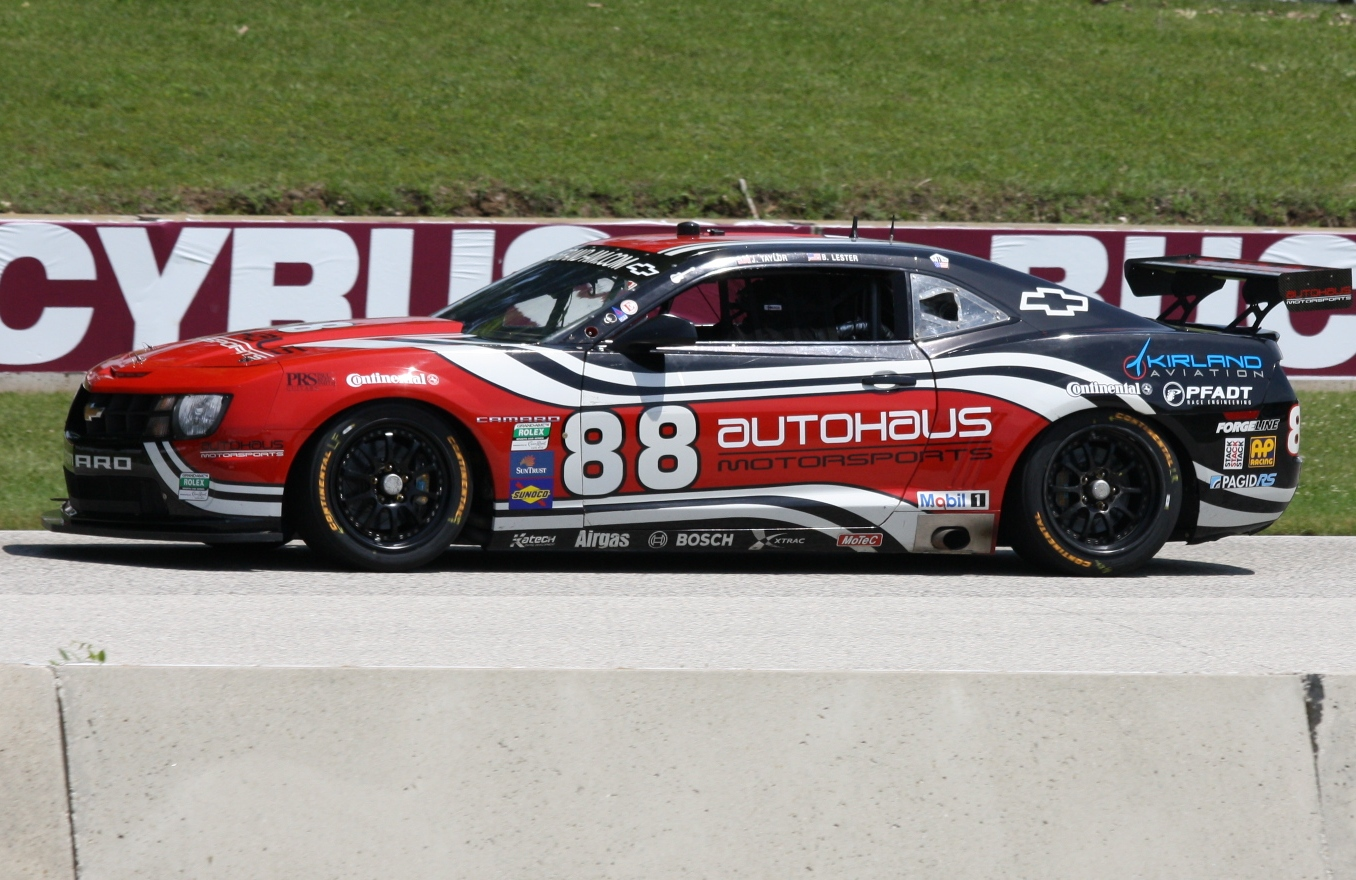
2011 Rolex Sports Car Series GT car

In 2008, Lester drove the No. 3 Riley Daytona Prototype for Southard Motorsports in the Grand-Am Rolex Sports Car Series, partnering with Shane Lewis. He moved to Orbit Racing for 2009, finishing third at the summer Daytona race. The next year, Lester moved to a new team in Starworks Motorsport driving the No. 7 BMW Riley for the full season, finishing seventeenth in points.

For 2011, Lester moved to the GT category with Autohaus Motorsports and their Chevrolet Camaro team. On May 14, 2011, Lester made sports car history by becoming the first African-American driver to win in any Grand-Am division. Fittingly, Lester won at the Virginia International Raceway, located close to the home of NASCAR's first African-American winner, Wendell Scott.

== Personal life ==
Lester's father is William A. Lester.

In 1984, Lester earned a Bachelor of Science degree in EECS from the University of California, Berkeley. Fresh out of college, he worked at Hewlett-Packard for 15 years before deciding to focus full-time on auto racing.

Lester lives in Windermere, Florida with his wife Cheryl, and their sons William Alexander IV (Alex) and Austin Richard.

Lester published an autobiography, Winning in Reverse, in February 2021.

== Motorsports career results ==
=== NASCAR ===
(key) (Bold – Pole position awarded by qualifying time. Italics – Pole position earned by points standings or practice time. * – Most laps led.)

==== Nextel Cup Series ====
NASCAR Nextel Cup Series results
Year	Team	No.	Make	1	2	3	4	5	6	7	8	9	10	11	12	13	14	15	16	17	18	19	20	21	22	23	24	25	26	27	28	29	30	31	32	33	34	35	36	NNCC	Pts	Ref
2006	Bill Davis Racing	23	Dodge	DAY	CAL	LVS	ATL; 38	BRI	MAR	TEX	PHO	TAL	RCH	DAR	CLT	DOV	POC	MCH; 32	SON	DAY	CHI	NHA	POC	IND	GLN	MCH	BRI	CAL; DNQ	RCH	NHA	DOV	KAN	TAL	CLT	MAR	ATL	TEX	PHO	HOM	68th	67	

==== Busch Series ====
NASCAR Busch Series results
Year	Team	No.	Make	1	2	3	4	5	6	7	8	9	10	11	12	13	14	15	16	17	18	19	20	21	22	23	24	25	26	27	28	29	30	31	32	NBSC	Pts	Ref
1999	Robert Hayes Racing	8	Chevy	DAY	CAR	LVS	ATL	DAR	TEX	NSV	BRI	TAL	CAL	NHA	RCH	NZH	CLT	DOV	SBO	GLN; 21	MLW	MYB	PPR	GTY	IRP	MCH	BRI	DAR	RCH	DOV	CLT	CAR	MEM	PHO	HOM	111th	100	

==== Camping World Truck Series ====
NASCAR Camping World Truck Series results
Year	Team	No.	Make	1	2	3	4	5	6	7	8	9	10	11	12	13	14	15	16	17	18	19	20	21	22	23	24	25	NCWTC	Pts	Ref
2000	Team 23 Racing	23	Chevy	DAY	HOM	PHO	MMR	MAR	PIR; 24	GTY	MEM	PPR	EVG	TEX	KEN	GLN	MLW	NHA	NZH	MCH	IRP	NSV	CIC	RCH; DNQ	DOV	TEX	CAL		86th	122	
2001	Bobby Hamilton Racing	4	Dodge	DAY	HOM	MMR	MAR	GTY; 36	DAR	PPR; 20	DOV	TEX	MEM	MLW	KAN	KEN	NHA	IRP	NSH; 30	CIC	NZH	RCH	SBO; 32	TEX	LVS	PHO; 18	CAL		59th	304	
2002	Bobby Hamilton Racing	8	Dodge	DAY; 18	DAR; 28	MAR; 25	GTY; 17	PPR; 15	DOV; 12	TEX; 11	MEM; 17	MLW; 18	KAN; 29	KEN; 14	NHA; 14	MCH; 15	IRP; 28	NSH; 16	RCH; 36	TEX; 28	SBO; 17	LVS; 17	CAL; 14	PHO; 15	HOM; 18				17th	2320	
2003	Bobby Hamilton Racing	8	Dodge	DAY; 18	DAR; 12	MMR; 13	MAR; 19	**CLT**; 15	DOV; 11	TEX; 12	MEM; 26	MLW; 12	KAN; 10	KEN; 12	GTW; 22	MCH; 11	IRP; 28	NSH; 16	BRI; 19	RCH; 30	NHA; 13	CAL; 28	LVS; 20	SBO; 23	TEX; 28	MAR; 22	PHO; 20	HOM; 18	14th	2712	
2004	Bill Davis Racing	22	Toyota	DAY; 16	ATL; 15	MAR; 17	MFD; 30	CLT; 21	DOV; 25	TEX; 12	MEM; 23	MLW; 34	KAN; 28	KEN; 29	GTW; 10	MCH; 18	IRP; 31	NSH; 31	BRI; 14	RCH; 29	NHA; 27	LVS; 24	CAL; 28	TEX; 28	MAR; 14	PHO; 18	DAR; 16	HOM; 24	22nd	2400	
2005	Bill Davis Racing	22	Toyota	DAY; 29	CAL; 16	ATL; 21	MAR; 26	GTY; 12	MFD; 18	CLT; 6	DOV; 30	TEX; 22	MCH; 16	MLW; 15	**KAN**; 5	**KEN**; 22	MEM; 35	IRP; 18	NSH; 7	BRI; 25	RCH; 14	NHA; 25	LVS; 32	MAR; 32	ATL; 19	TEX; 11	PHO; 21	HOM; 5	17th	2672	
2006	Bill Davis Racing	22	Toyota	DAY; 35	CAL; 15	ATL; 29	MAR; 24	GTY; 30	CLT; DNQ	MFD; 24	DOV; 30	TEX; 22	MCH; 33	MLW; 15	KAN; 23	KEN; 28	MEM; 25	IRP; 14	NSH; 21	BRI; 16	NHA; 35	LVS; 19	TAL; 31	MAR; 12	ATL; 22	TEX; 21	PHO; 20	HOM; 11	20th	2252	
2007	Billy Ballew Motorsports	15	Chevy	DAY; 11	CAL; 20	ATL; 30	MAR; 36	KAN; 16	CLT; 19	MFD; 21	DOV; 35	TEX; 18	MCH; 15	MLW; 24	MEM; 12	KEN; 8	IRP; 16	NSH; 20	BRI	GTW	NHA	LVS	TAL	MAR	ATL	TEX	PHO	HOM	23rd	1550	
2021	David Gilliland Racing	17	Ford	DAY	DAY	LVS	ATL; 36	BRI	RCH	KAN	DAR	COA	CLT	TEX	NSH	POC	KNX	GLN	GTW	DAR	BRI	LVS	TAL	MAR	PHO				89th	1	

^{*} Season still in progress
^{1} Ineligible for series points
