= Garrett Liberty =

American racing driver

- Born: November 29, 1979 (age 46) Jonesboro, Georgia, U.S.

ARCA Re/Max Series career
- Debut season: 2004
- Starts: 5
- Wins: 0
- Poles: 0
- Best finish: 59th in 2004
- Finished last season: 59th (2004)

Previous series
- 2007: NASCAR Busch East Series

NASCAR O'Reilly Auto Parts Series career
- 1 race run over 1 year
- 2004 position: 130th
- Best finish: 130th (2004)
- First race: 2004 Sam's Town 250 (Memphis)
Wins	Top tens	Poles
0	0	0

NASCAR FedEx Freight Truck Series career
- 1 race run over 2 years
- 2006 position: N/A
- Best finish: 84th (2005)
- First race: 2005 Sylvania 200 (New Hampshire)
Wins	Top tens	Poles
0	0	0
- Statistics up to date as of July 4, 2020.

Garrett Liberty (born November 29, 1979) is an American professional stock car racing driver. He competed in one NASCAR Busch Series in 2004, one East Series race in 2007, and also made one NASCAR Truck Series start in 2005 (with a second attempt in 2006) and five ARCA starts (and a sixth attempt) in 2004.

== Racing career ==
Liberty competed part-time in the ARCA Re/Max Series in 2004, attempting six races, which were at both Toledo races, Berlin, Gateway (which he wouldn't qualify for), Lake Erie, and Nashville. He drove the No. 6 Pontiac and No. 4 Ford for Andy Belmont's team in his first three races, the No. 58 Pontiac for Day Enterprise Racing in his next two, and his final start of the season came in Wayne Peterson's No. 06 Chevrolet. His best finish was a 21st at Berlin, which was the only race he was running at the finish in.

== Motorsports career results ==
=== NASCAR ===
(key) (Bold – Pole position awarded by qualifying time. Italics – Pole position earned by points standings or practice time. * – Most laps led.)

==== Busch Series ====
NASCAR Busch Series results
Year	Team	No.	Make	1	2	3	4	5	6	7	8	9	10	11	12	13	14	15	16	17	18	19	20	21	22	23	24	25	26	27	28	29	30	31	32	33	34	NBSC	Pts	Ref
2004	SCORE Motorsports	02	Chevy	DAY	CAR	LVS	DAR	BRI	TEX	NSH	TAL	CAL	GTY	RCH	NZH	CLT	DOV	NSH	KEN	MLW	DAY	CHI	NHA	PPR	IRP	MCH	BRI	CAL	RCH	DOV	KAN	CLT	MEM; 31	ATL	PHO	DAR	HOM	130th	70	

==== Craftsman Truck Series ====
NASCAR Craftsman Truck Series results
Year	Team	No.	Make	1	2	3	4	5	6	7	8	9	10	11	12	13	14	15	16	17	18	19	20	21	22	23	24	25	NCTC	Pts	Ref
2005	Bobby Hamilton Racing	4	Dodge	DAY	CAL	ATL	MAR	GTY	MFD	CLT	DOV	TEX	MCH	MLW	KAN	KEN	MEM	IRP	NSH	BRI	RCH	NHA; 31	LVS	MAR	ATL	TEX	PHO	HOM	84th	70	
2006	Lafferty Motorsports	89	Chevy	DAY	CAL	ATL	MAR	GTY	CLT	MFD	DOV	TEX	MCH	MLW	KAN	KEN	MEM	IRP	NSH	BRI	NHA; DNQ	LVS	TAL	MAR	ATL	TEX	PHO	HOM	N/A	0	

==== Busch East Series ====
NASCAR Busch East Series results
Year	Team	No.	Make	1	2	3	4	5	6	7	8	9	10	11	12	13	NBEC	Pts	Ref
2007	Ginn Racing	13	Chevy	GRE	ELK	IOW	SBO	STA	NHA; 31	TMP	NSH	ADI	LRP	MFD	NHA	DOV	72nd	70	

=== ARCA Re/Max Series ===
(key) (Bold – Pole position awarded by qualifying time. Italics – Pole position earned by points standings or practice time. * – Most laps led.)

ARCA Re/Max Series results
Year	Team	No.	Make	1	2	3	4	5	6	7	8	9	10	11	12	13	14	15	16	17	18	19	20	21	22	ARMC	Pts	Ref
2004	Andy Belmont Racing	6	Pontiac	DAY	NSH	SLM	KEN	TOL; 28	CLT	KAN	POC	MCH	SBO													59th	500	
2004	Andy Belmont Racing	4	Ford											BLN; 21	KEN	GTW; DNQ	POC									59th	500	
2004	Day Enterprise Racing	58	Pontiac															LER; 27	NSH; 28	ISF						59th	500	
2004	Wayne Peterson Racing	06	Chevy																		TOL; 31	DSF	CHI	SLM	TAL	59th	500	
