= Todd Shafer =

American racing driver (born 1976)

- Born: November 29, 1976 (age 49); Ashland, Ohio, U.S.

NASCAR O'Reilly Auto Parts Series career
- 0 races run over 3 years
Wins	Top tens	Poles
0	0	0

NASCAR FedEx Freight Truck Series career
- 4 races run over 3 years
- 2014 position: 60th
- Best finish: 60th (2014)
- First race: 2006 Power Stroke Diesel 200 (IRP)
- Last race: 2014 Lucas Oil 225 (Chicagoland)
Wins	Top tens	Poles
0	0	0
- Statistics up to date as of July 16, 2020.

Todd Shafer (born November 29, 1976) is an American professional stock car racing driver. He last competed part-time in the NASCAR Camping World Truck Series, driving the Nos. 07 and 08 Chevrolet Silverados for SS-Green Light Racing. He is the father of fellow driver Jonathan Shafer.

== Motorsports career results ==
=== NASCAR ===
(key) (Bold – Pole position awarded by qualifying time. Italics – Pole position earned by points standings or practice time. * – Most laps led.)

==== Busch Series ====
NASCAR Xfinity Series results
Year	Team	No.	Make	1	2	3	4	5	6	7	8	9	10	11	12	13	14	15	16	17	18	19	20	21	22	23	24	25	26	27	28	29	30	31	32	33	34	35	NBSC	Pts	Ref
2004	Tri-City Motorsports	40	Ford	DAY	CAR	LVS	DAR	BRI	TEX	NSH	TAL	CAL	GTY	RCH	NZH	CLT	DOV	NSH	KEN	MLW	DAY	CHI	NHA	PPR	IRP	MCH	BRI	CAL	RCH	DOV	KAN	CLT	MEM; DNQ	ATL	PHO	DAR	HOM		N/A	0	
2005	Tri-City Motorsports	91	Ford	DAY	CAL	MXC	LVS	ATL	NSH	BRI	TEX	PHO	TAL	DAR	RCH	CLT	DOV	NSH	KEN	MLW; DNQ	DAY	CHI	NHA	PPR	GTY	IRP; DNQ	GLN	MCH	BRI	CAL	RCH	DOV	KAN	CLT	MEM	TEX	PHO	HOM	N/A	0	
2006	Jay Robinson Racing	28	Ford	DAY	CAL	MXC	LVS	ATL	BRI	TEX	NSH	PHO	TAL	RCH	DAR	CLT	DOV	NSH	KEN	MLW	DAY	CHI	NHA	MAR	GTY	IRP; DNQ	GLN	MCH	BRI	CAL	RCH	DOV	KAN	CLT	MEM	TEX	PHO	HOM	N/A	0	

==== Camping World Truck Series ====
NASCAR Camping World Truck Series results
Year	Team	No.	Make	1	2	3	4	5	6	7	8	9	10	11	12	13	14	15	16	17	18	19	20	21	22	23	24	25	NCWTC	Pts	Ref
2006	Tri-City Motorsports	91	Ford	DAY	CAL	ATL	MAR	GTY	CLT	MFD; DNQ	DOV	TEX	MCH	MLW	KAN			IRP; 36	NSH	BRI	NHA	LVS	TAL						N/A	0	
2006	Tri-City Motorsports	19	Ford													KEN; DNQ	MEM							MAR; DNQ	ATL	TEX	PHO	HOM	N/A	0	
2012	Arrington Racing	15	Toyota	DAY	MAR	CAR	KAN	CLT	DOV	TEX	KEN	IOW; 32	CHI	POC	MCH	BRI	ATL	IOW	KEN	LVS	TAL	MAR	TEX	PHO	HOM				75th	12	
2014	SS-Green Light Racing	08	Chevy	DAY	MAR	KAN; 26	CLT	DOV	TEX	GTW	KEN	IOW	ELD	POC	MCH	BRI	MSP												60th	37	
2014	SS-Green Light Racing	07	Chevy															CHI; 25	NHA	LVS	TAL	MAR	TEX	PHO	HOM				60th	37	

=== ARCA Re/Max Series ===
(key) (Bold – Pole position awarded by qualifying time. Italics – Pole position earned by points standings or practice time. * – Most laps led.)

ARCA Re/Max Series results
Year	Team	No.	Make	1	2	3	4	5	6	7	8	9	10	11	12	13	14	15	16	17	18	19	20	21	22	23	24	25	ARMSC	Pts	Ref
2000	Info not available	26	Info not available	DAY	SLM	AND	CLT	KIL	FRS	MCH	POC	TOL	KEN	BLN	POC	WIN	ISF	KEN	DSF	SLM	CLT	TAL	ATL; DNQ						N/A	0	
2001	Al Richmond	29	Ford	DAY; DNQ	NSH	WIN	SLM	GTY	KEN																				125th	180	
2001	Capital City Motorsports	38	Ford							CLT; 28	KAN																		125th	180	
2001	Cunningham Motorsports	4	Ford									MCH; 33	POC	MEM	GLN	KEN	MCH	POC	NSH	ISF	CHI	DSF	SLM	TOL	BLN	CLT	TAL	ATL	125th	180	
2002	Shafer Racing	29	Ford	DAY; DNQ	ATL	NSH	SLM	KEN	CLT	KAN	POC; 28	MCH	TOL	SBO	KEN	BLN	POC	NSH	ISF	WIN	DSF	CHI	SLM	TAL	CLT				145th	115	
