= Chase Montgomery =

American racing driver (born 1983)

- Born: September 29, 1983 (age 43); Mt. Juliet, Tennessee, U.S.

NASCAR O'Reilly Auto Parts Series career
- 15 races run over 1 year
- Best finish: 41st (2003)
- First race: 2003 Koolerz 300 (Daytona)
- Last race: 2003 Ford 300 (Homestead)
Wins	Top tens	Poles
0	1	0

NASCAR FedEx Freight Truck Series career
- 53 races run over 4 years
- Best finish: 21st (2004)
- First race: 2003 Federated Auto Parts 200 (Nashville)
- Last race: 2006 Smith's Las Vegas 350 (Las Vegas)
Wins	Top tens	Poles
0	0	0
- Statistics up to date as of November 25, 2012.

Chase Montgomery (born September 29, 1983) is an American professional stock car racing driver. He currently owns a small business and continues to pursue a racing career. He lives in Wilson County, Tennessee. He is now married and a father.

== Career before NASCAR ==
Montgomery began racing go-karts at the age of 13. He began rising through the ranks very quickly and by 2000, he was a regular weekly driver at Nashville Speedway USA. In 2002, he joined the ARCA Re/MAX Series, posting four top-fives and finishing fourth in points, runner-up in the Rookie of the Year points. He also became the youngest driver to win the pole for an ARCA race at Daytona that same season. That year, rock singer Alice Cooper came on board as a co-owner and marketing partner of his race team. The next season, he won the season opening-race at Daytona International Speedway.

== NASCAR career ==
Montgomery began his NASCAR career in 2003 with 15 starts in the Busch Series with Brewco Motorsports, posting a top-ten in his series debut at the Koolerz 300. After that season came to a close, he signed to drive the No. 8 Dodge for Bobby Hamilton Racing. He finished 21st in points that year, and 23rd in 2005 in the No. 18. In 2006, he was to drive part-time for Curry Racing, however, after finishing the season opener at Daytona 19th, the deal fell through and Montgomery left the team. He has not raced since.

== Motorsports career results ==
=== NASCAR ===
(key) (Bold – Pole position awarded by qualifying time. Italics – Pole position earned by points standings or practice time. * – Most laps led.)

==== Busch Series ====
NASCAR Busch Series results
Year	Team	No.	Make	1	2	3	4	5	6	7	8	9	10	11	12	13	14	15	16	17	18	19	20	21	22	23	24	25	26	27	28	29	30	31	32	33	34	NBSC	Pts	Ref
2003	Brewco Motorsports	27	Pontiac	DAY; 10	CAR	LVS; 36	DAR	BRI; 22	TEX; 12	TAL; 13	NSH; 39	CAL; 25	RCH	GTY	NZH	CLT	DOV	NSH	KEN	MLW											KAN; 27	CLT; 34	MEM; 26	ATL; 34	PHO; 30	CAR; 31	HOM; 33	41st	1219	
2003	Montgomery Motorsports	80	Chevy																		DAY; 37	CHI	NHA	PPR	IRP	MCH	BRI	DAR	RCH	DOV								41st	1219	

==== Craftsman Truck Series ====
NASCAR Craftsman Truck Series results
Year	Team	No.	Make	1	2	3	4	5	6	7	8	9	10	11	12	13	14	15	16	17	18	19	20	21	22	23	24	25	NCTC	Pts	Ref
2003	Ware Racing Enterprises	51	Chevy	DAY	DAR	MMR	MAR	CLT	DOV	TEX	MEM	MLW	KAN	KEN	GTW	MCH	IRP	NSH; 22	BRI	RCH	NHA	CAL	LVS	SBO	TEX	MAR	PHO	HOM	106th	97	
2004	Bobby Hamilton Racing	8	Dodge	DAY; 31	ATL; 23	MAR; 16	MFD; 29	CLT; 24	DOV; 28	TEX; 17	MEM; 18	MLW; 27	KAN; 13	KEN; 20	GTW; 12	MCH; 15	IRP; 32	NSH; 23	BRI; 20	RCH; 27	NHA; 17	LVS; 27	CAL; 16	TEX; 17	MAR; 19	PHO; 36	DAR; 29	HOM; 21	21st	2404	
2005	Bobby Hamilton Racing	18	Dodge	DAY; 31	CAL; 29	ATL; 26	MAR; 30	GTY; 19	MFD; 24	CLT; 13	DOV; 18	TEX; 33	MCH; 20	MLW; 33	KAN; 20	KEN; 34	MEM; 25	IRP; 22	NSH; 22	BRI; 22	RCH; 22	NHA; 34	LVS; 19	MAR; 20	ATL; 31	TEX; 19	PHO; 26	HOM; 23	23rd	2230	
2006	Bobby Hamilton Racing	8	Dodge	DAY; 19	CAL	ATL; DNQ	MAR	GTY	CLT	MFD	DOV	TEX	MCH	MLW	KAN	KEN	MEM	IRP	NSH	BRI	NHA								59th	188	
2006	Jeff Milburn Racing	76	Chevy																			LVS; 27	TAL	MAR	ATL	TEX	PHO	HOM	59th	188	

=== ARCA Re/Max Series ===
(key) (Bold – Pole position awarded by qualifying time. Italics – Pole position earned by points standings or practice time. * – Most laps led.)

ARCA Re/Max Series results
Year	Team	No.	Make	1	2	3	4	5	6	7	8	9	10	11	12	13	14	15	16	17	18	19	20	21	22	23	24	25	ARMC	Pts	Ref
2001	Montgomery Motorsports	6	Chevy	DAY	NSH; 34	WIN	SLM	GTY	KEN; 12	CLT	KAN; 29	MCH	POC	MEM	GLN	KEN; 5	MCH	POC	NSH; 35	ISF	CHI	DSF	SLM	TOL	BLN	CLT; 6	TAL	ATL; 24	40th	910	
2002	Montgomery Motorsports	27	Pontiac	**DAY**; 21																				TAL; 27					4th	4755	
2002	Montgomery Motorsports	27	Chevy		ATL; 34	NSH; 5		KEN; 11	CLT; 8	KAN; 12	POC; 8	MCH; 10	TOL; 22	SBO; 5	KEN; 29	BLN; 6	POC; 8	NSH; 3	ISF; 11	WIN; 22	DSF; 32		SLM; 4						4th	4755	
2002	Capital City Motorsports	38	Ford				SLM; 18																						4th	4755	
2002	Montgomery Motorsports	27	Ford																			CHI; 6			CLT; 25				4th	4755	
2003	Montgomery Motorsports	27	Pontiac	DAY; 1																			TAL; 31	CLT	SBO				34th	765	
2003	Montgomery Motorsports	27	Chevy		ATL; 23	NSH; 25	SLM	TOL	KEN; 31	CLT	BLN	KAN	MCH	LER	POC	POC	NSH	ISF	WIN; 17	DSF	CHI	SLM							34th	765	
