= Bobby Hamilton Racing =

Former NASCAR team

Bobby Hamilton-Racing Virginia
- Owner(s): Bobby Hamilton, Lori Hamilton, Mac Bailey, Mark Melling, Clay Campbell, Stacy Compton, Joey Arrington
- Base: Mt. Juliet, Tennessee (1996–2007); Martinsville, Virginia (2008)
- Series: Sprint Cup, Craftsman Truck Series)
- Race drivers: Bobby Hamilton, Joe Ruttman, Deborah Renshaw, Robert Pressley, Bill Lester, Dennis Setzer, Stacy Compton
- Manufacturer: Dodge
- Opened: 1996
- Closed: 2008

Career
- Drivers' Championships: 1 (2004 Trucks)
- Race victories: 20

Bobby Hamilton Racing-Virginia is a disbanded NASCAR racing team. It was owned by four-time Winston Cup winner and 2004 NASCAR Craftsman Truck Series champion Bobby Hamilton until his death on January 7, 2007. Bobby Hamilton Jr. was given ownership after the death of his father, but the younger Hamilton disavowed his relationship with the company. The company was last run by Bobby Hamilton, Sr's widow, Lori Hamilton.

The company, formerly based in Mt. Juliet, Tennessee made plans to move to Martinsville, Virginia after announcing a partnership with Arrington Manufacturing in December 2007 as its new owners were based in the Virginia area, with Mac Bailey, Stacy Compton, Clay Campbell, and Joey Arrington all being Virginians.

== History ==
BHR was originally started by Hamilton and a friend in 1996 in the fledgling Truck Series as an after hours project for Hamilton as well as to serve as development program for Bobby Hamilton Jr.. The elder Hamilton debuted the team in 1997 at Heartland Park Topeka, as the No. 1 Chevrolet sponsored by Southern Pride Trucking. He qualified sixteenth and finished sixth. He ran another race that year at Martinsville Speedway, as the No. 51. He finished fifth in that race. Hamilton ran three races the next year, but suffered mechanical failures in each of them. Meanwhile, Bobby Hamilton Jr., whom the team was originally designed for, was building up a successful career in the ARCA series, then signed on to drive for Sadler Brothers Racing in the Busch Series.

=== Cup Series ===
The team made its first start in the Cup Series at the 2000 Pennzoil 400 as the No. 57 Chevrolet. Bobby Hamilton Jr. started thirtieth and finished thirty-third, six laps down. BHR did not run the Cup Series again until 2005, when the No. 04 Dodge ran for two races. Hamilton Sr. had a best finish of 27th at the Allstate 400.

==== Car No. 04 results ====
Year	Driver	No.	Make	1	2	3	4	5	6	7	8	9	10	11	12	13	14	15	16	17	18	19	20	21	22	23	24	25	26	27	28	29	30	31	32	33	34	35	36	Owners	Pts
2000	Bobby Hamilton Jr.	57	Chevy	DAY	CAR	LVS	ATL	DAR	BRI	TEX	MAR	TAL	CAL	RCH	CLT	DOV	MCH	POC	SON	DAY	NHA	POC	IND	GLN	MCH	BRI	DAR	RCH	NHA	DOV	MAR	CLT	TAL	CAR	PHO	HOM; 33	ATL			57th	64
2005	Bobby Hamilton	04	Dodge	DAY	CAL	LVS	ATL	BRI	MAR	TEX	PHO	TAL	DAR	RCH	CLT	DOV	POC	MCH	SON	DAY	CHI	NHA	POC	IND; 27	GLN	MCH	BRI	CAL	RCH	NHA	DOV	TAL	KAN	CLT	MAR	ATL; 30	TEX	PHO	HOM	60th	155
2006	Bobby Hamilton Jr.	04	Dodge	DAY	CAL	LVS; DNQ	ATL	BRI	MAR	TEX	PHO	TAL	RCH	DAR	CLT	DOV	POC	MCH	SON	DAY	CHI	NHA	POC; DNQ	IND; DNQ	GLN	MCH	BRI	CAL	RCH	NHA	DOV	KAN	TAL	CLT	MAR	ATL	TEX	PHO	HOM	73rd	16

=== Truck Series ===
==== Truck No. 04 history ====
The No. 04 truck made its debut as a brand new team in 2004. Bobby Hamilton Jr. was the driver and won the pole at Nashville Superspeedway. With sponsorship from Hyde Park Electronics, Hamilton Jr. won the pole and finished 4th. Hamilton Sr. was the full-time driver in 2005 and won two races total that season and finished 6th in points. Hamilton moved to the No. 18 in 2006, and rookie Scott Lagasse Jr. took over with Dodge Hemi as the sponsor. Lagasse made a total of ten starts and did not finish higher than 18th. Sammy Sanders, David Stremme, and Timothy Peters drove the truck in one race in addition. The team did not run the first half of the 2007 schedule, and ran two races with Joe Ruttman driving, with a best finish of 33rd. Patrick Carpentier drove at Bristol in 2008 for one race. He finished 26th after a late crash.

==== Truck No. 04 results ====
NASCAR Craftsman Truck Series results
Year	Team	No.	Make	1	2	3	4	5	6	7	8	9	10	11	12	13	14	15	16	17	18	19	20	21	22	23	24	25	NCTC	Pts	Ref
2004	Bobby Hamilton Jr.	04	Dodge	DAY	ATL	MAR	MFD	CLT	DOV	TEX	MEM	MLW	KAN	KEN	GTW	MCH	IRP	NSH; 4	BRI	RCH	NHA	LVS	CAL	TEX	MAR	PHO	DAR		46th	395	
2004	Sammy Sanders	04	Dodge																									HOM; DNQ	46th	395	
2005	Bobby Hamilton	04	Dodge	DAY; 1	CAL; 2	ATL; 3	MAR; 20	GTY; 6	MFD; 1*	CLT; 28	DOV; 21	TEX; 17	MCH; 3	MLW; 6	KAN; 12	KEN; 31	MEM; 6	IRP; 13	NSH; 9	BRI; 31	RCH; 24	NHA; 30	LVS; 5	MAR; 14	ATL; 7	TEX; 9	PHO; 17	HOM; 31	6th	3164	
2006	Kevin Hamlin	04	Dodge	DAY; 11																									34th	1073	
2006	Scott Lagasse Jr.	04	Dodge		CAL; 30	ATL; 31		GTY; 21	CLT; 32	MFD; 20	DOV; 35	TEX; 29					MEM; 26	IRP					TAL; 34	MAR	ATL; 18	TEX	PHO	HOM	34th	1073	
2006	David Stremme	04	Dodge				MAR; 32																						34th	1073	
2006	Timothy Peters	04	Dodge										MCH; 35	MLW	KAN	KEN													34th	1073	
2006	Sammy Sanders	04	Dodge																NSH; 25	BRI; 22	NHA	LVS							34th	1073	
2007	Joe Ruttman	04	Dodge	DAY	CAL	ATL	MAR	KAN	CLT	MFD	DOV	TEX	MCH	MLW	MEM	KEN	IRP	NSH; 33	BRI	GTY; 35	NHA	LVS	TAL	MAR	ATL	TEX	PHO	HOM	77th	170	
2008	Patrick Carpentier	04	Dodge	DAY	CAL	ATL	MAR	KAN	CLT	MFD	DOV	TEX	MCH	MLW	MEM	KEN	IRP	NSH	BRI; 25	GTY	NHA	LVS	TAL	MAR	ATL	TEX	PHO	HOM	89th	88	

==== Truck No. 4 history ====
Hamilton began racing the No. 4 in 1999 with sponsorship from Dana Holding Corporation. Driving in five races, Hamilton won the pole at Richmond International Raceway and had a best finish of fourth. Olivier Beretta drove the truck in one race at Heartland Park Topeka, finishing seventeenth. Hamilton drove another five races in 2000, winning at Martinsville Speedway. Donny Morelock made an additional four starts that year, his best finish 19th at Michigan International Speedway. In 2001, Hamilton picked up another win at Darlington Raceway, while Hamilton Jr. made his Truck Series debut at The Milwaukee Mile, finishing 33rd.

In 2002, the No. 4 team began running full-time with Brian Rose as the driver. He began the season with four top-tens in the Perry Construction truck, but was released midway through the season. Hamilton, Hamilton Jr., Joe Ruttman, Rick Bogart, and Ryan Hemphill finished the season in the truck, allowing the team to finish seventeenth in the standings. In 2003, Hamilton Sr. left his Andy Petree Racing Winston Cup ride to drive the No. 4 full-time with sponsorship Square D. He picked up two wins and finished sixth in points. The following season, he won an additional four races (including one at his "home track", Nashville Superspeedway) and was named the Craftsman Truck Series champion.

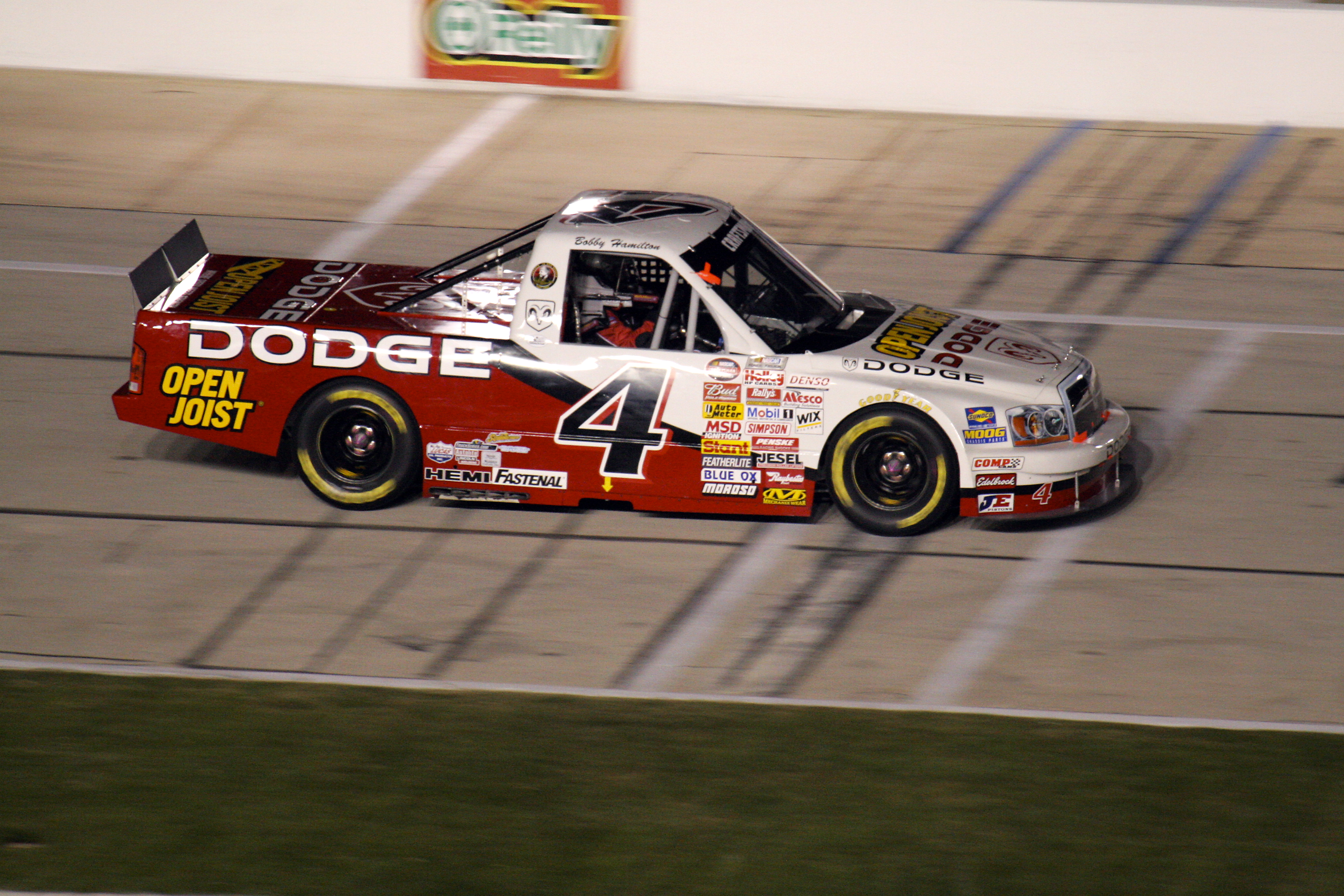
The No. 4 truck in 2007.

Hamilton moved to the No. 04 team in 2005. Casey Atwood signed to drive the No. 4 Baileys truck for three races, finishing 11th at Atlanta Motor Speedway. Development driver Timothy Peters took over and drove for seventeen races, finishing in the top-ten twice and was runner-up to Todd Kluever for Rookie of the Year. Chris Fontaine, Erin Crocker, and John Mickel in other races towards the end of the season. Peters was named the team's full-time driver in 2006 and competed in sixteen races in the truck (driving the No. 04 at Michigan when Bobby Labonte drove the No. 4) with a sixth-place finish at The Milwaukee Mile. When he signed a contract with Richard Childress Racing, Peters was removed from the ride and replaced with Dodge driver Chase Miller. He had a best finish of tenth but was released before the 2007 Quaker Steak and Lube 200. 2002 Truck Series Champion Mike Bliss drove the No. 4 in 11 out of the final 14 races of the 2007 season, with Kevin Hamlin supplementing the rest of the schedule. Ruttman raced the 4 at Texas, finishing 27th after a crash. New co-owner Stacy Compton drove the No. 4 full-time in 2008 with sponsorship from various Dodge dealerships across America. After the fall Bristol race, the No. 4 team closed due to a lack of funding.

==== Truck No. 4 results ====
NASCAR Craftsman Truck Series results
Year	Driver	No.	Make	1	2	3	4	5	6	7	8	9	10	11	12	13	14	15	16	17	18	19	20	21	22	23	24	25	NCTC	Pts	Ref
1999	Bobby Hamilton	4	Dodge	HOM	PHO	EVG	MMR	MAR; 22	MEM; 21	PPR	I70	BRI	TEX	PIR	GLN	MLW	NSV	NZH	MCH	NHA; 22	IRP	GTY	HPT	RCH; 31	LVS	LVL	TEX	CAL	36th	539	
1999	Olivier Beretta	4	Dodge																				HPT; 17						36th	539	
2000	Bobby Hamilton	4	Dodge	DAY; 30	HOM	PHO	MMR	MAR; 1*	PIR	GTY	MEM; 29	PPR						NHA; 20						RCH; 10	DOV	TEX	CAL		30th	1045	
2000	Donny Morelock	4	Dodge										EVG; 32	TEX	KEN	GLN; DNQ	MLW; 27		NZH; 21	MCH; 19	IRP; DNQ	NSV	CIC						30th	1045	
2001	Bobby Hamilton	4	Dodge	DAY	HOM; 15*	MMR	MAR	GTY	DAR; 1*	PPR	DOV	TEX	MEM	MLW	KAN	KEN	NHA; 25	IRP; 4	NSH	CIC	NZH	RCH; 7	SBO	TEX	LVS	PHO	CAL		38th	707	
2002	Brian Rose	4	Dodge	DAY; 3	DAR; 8	MAR; 27	GTY; 8	PPR; 10	DOV; 30	TEX; 35	MEM; 10	MLW; 19	KAN; 21	KEN; 24	NHA; 25	MCH; 23													22nd	2110	
2002	Bobby Hamilton	4	Dodge														IRP; 30		RCH; 14										22nd	2110	
2002	Bobby Hamilton Jr.	4	Dodge															NSH; 4											22nd	2110	
2002	Joe Ruttman	4	Dodge																	TEX; 11									22nd	2110	
2002	Ryan Hemphill	4	Dodge																		SBO; 10	LVS; 14		PHO; 26	HOM; 28				22nd	2110	
2002	Rick Bogart	4	Dodge																				PHO; 31						22nd	2110	
2003	Bobby Hamilton	4	Dodge	DAY; 4	DAR; 1	MMR; 4	MAR; 5	CLT; 7	DOV; 2	TEX; 7	MEM; 7	MLW; 29	KAN; 16	KEN; 18	GTW; 14	MCH; 10	IRP; 3	NSH; 11	BRI; 12	RCH; 8	NHA; 3	CAL; 16	LVS; 10	SBO; 8	TEX; 10	MAR; 5	PHO; 5	HOM; 1*	6th	3627	
2004	Bobby Hamilton	4	Dodge	DAY; 11	ATL; 1	MAR; 31	MFD; 4	CLT; 10	DOV; 19	TEX; 7	MEM; 1	MLW; 6	KAN; 2	KEN; 1	GTW; 17	MCH; 5	IRP; 3	NSH; 1	BRI; 12	RCH; 26	NHA; 15	LVS; 5	CAL; 5	TEX; 3	MAR; 26	PHO; 7	DAR; 2	HOM; 16	1st	3624	
2005	Casey Atwood	4	Dodge	DAY; 14	CAL; 11	ATL; 22																							20th	2528	
2005	Timothy Peters	4	Dodge				MAR; 18	GTW; 16		CLT; 32	DOV; 6	TEX; 32	MCH; 25			KEN; 28	MEM; 18	IRP; 28	NSH; 33	BRI; 19	RCH; 29		LVS; 26	MAR; 8	ATL; 18			HOM; 15	20th	2528	
2005	Chris Fontaine	4	Dodge						MFD; 17					MLW; 25	KAN; 29														20th	2528	
2005	Garrett Liberty	4	Dodge																			NHA; 31							20th	2528	
2005	John Mickel	4	Dodge																							TEX; 29			20th	2528	
2005	Erin Crocker	4	Dodge																								PHO; 36		20th	2528	
2006	Timothy Peters	4	Dodge	DAY; 12	CAL; 24	ATL; 33	MAR; 35	GTW; 32	CLT; 23	MFD; 11	DOV; 14	TEX; 20		MLW; 6	KAN; 19	KEN; 25	MEM; 12	IRP; 15	NSH; 19	BRI; 33									17th	2607	
2006	Bobby Labonte	4	Dodge										MCH; 3																17th	2607	
2006	Chase Miller	4	Dodge																		NHA; 17	LVS; 32	TAL; 21	MAR; 10	ATL; 33	TEX; 30	PHO; 35	HOM; 32	17th	2607	
2007	Chase Miller	4	Dodge	DAY; 22	CAL; 14	ATL; 34	MAR; 32	KAN; 19																					14th	2638	
2007	Kevin Hamlin	4	Dodge						CLT; 25	MFD; 10					MEM; 21							LVS; 17							14th	2638	
2007	Mike Bliss	4	Dodge								DOV; 5			MLW; 7		KEN; 9	IRP; 11	NSH; 24	BRI; 7	GTY; 25	NHA; 5		TAL; 34	MAR; 6		TEX; 4	PHO; 3*	HOM; 32	14th	2638	
2007	Joe Ruttman	4	Dodge									TEX; 27																	14th	2638	
2007	Bobby Labonte	4	Dodge										MCH; 18																14th	2638	
2007	Ryan Matthews	4	Dodge																						ATL; 16				14th	2638	
2008	Stacy Compton	4	Dodge	DAY; 6	CAL; 21	ATL; 19	MAR; 35	KAN; 20	CLT; 28	MFD; 10	DOV; 23	TEX; 30	MCH; 21	MLW; 24	MEM; 10	KEN; 12	IRP; 23	NSH; 7	BRI; 31	GTW	NHA	LVS	TAL						24th	1748	
2008	Sam Hornish Jr.	4	Dodge																					MAR; 9	ATL	TEX	PHO	HOM	24th	1748	

==== Truck No. 8 history ====
The No. 8 truck debuted in 2001 with Willy T. Ribbs as the driver. In his rookie season, Ribbs drove in 23 races and had three top-twenty finishes, finishing 16th in points, but was replaced by Bill Lester in 2002. He finished seventeenth in points and ended the season with three consecutive top-ten qualifying runs. The following season, Lester won his first career pole at Lowe's Motor Speedway and scored his first top-ten finish at Kansas Speedway. Lester left for Bill Davis Racing at the end of the year.

Chase Montgomery was hired to drive the No. 8 in 2004, which now ran under the moniker BHR2 as Montgomery's father Ray had purchased an ownership stake in the team. Montgomery failed to finish in the top-ten that season and finished 21st in points. He was moved to the No. 18 truck and Deborah Renshaw took his place, bringing sponsorship from Easy Care. She had a best finish of twelfth and earned a 24th-place points finish. A lack of sponsorship would cost her the ride. Montgomery returned to run the 8 at Daytona, and finished 19th. The team was then sold to Julius Curry, and attempted the spring race at Atlanta with Montgomery, but failed to qualify.

==== Truck No. 8 results ====
NASCAR Craftsman Truck Series results
Year	Driver	No.	Make	1	2	3	4	5	6	7	8	9	10	11	12	13	14	15	16	17	18	19	20	21	22	23	24	25	NCTC	Pts	Ref
2001	Willy T. Ribbs	8	Dodge	DAY; 23	HOM; 19	MMR; 28	MAR; DNQ	GTY; 20	DAR; 29	PPR; 13	DOV; 19	TEX; 25	MEM; 17	MLW; 18	KAN; 15	KEN; 30	NHA; 18	IRP; 20	NSH; 24	CIC; 28	NZH; 18	RCH; 20	SBO; 28	TEX; 19	LVS; 25	PHO; 19	CAL; 18		16th	2319	
2002	Bill Lester	8	Dodge	DAY; 18	DAR; 28	MAR; 25	GTY; 17	PPR; 15	DOV; 12	TEX; 11	MEM; 17	MLW; 18	KAN; 29	KEN; 14	NHA; 14	MCH; 15	IRP; 28	NSH; 16	RCH; 36	TEX; 28	SBO; 17	LVS; 17	CAL; 14	PHO; 15	HOM; 18				17th	2320	
2003	Bill Lester	8	Dodge	DAY; 18	DAR; 12	MMR; 13	MAR; 19	CLT; 15	DOV; 11	TEX; 12	MEM; 26	MLW; 12	KAN; 10	KEN; 12	GTW; 22	MCH; 11	IRP; 28	NSH; 16	BRI; 19	RCH; 30	NHA; 13	CAL; 28	LVS; 20	SBO; 23	TEX; 28	MAR; 22	PHO; 20	HOM; 18	14th	2712	
2004	Chase Montgomery	8	Dodge	DAY; 31	ATL; 23	MAR; 16	MFD; 29	CLT; 24	DOV; 28	TEX; 17	MEM; 18	MLW; 27	KAN; 13	KEN; 20	GTW; 12	MCH; 15	IRP; 32	NSH; 23	BRI; 20	RCH; 27	NHA; 17	LVS; 27	CAL; 16	TEX; 17	MAR; 19	PHO; 36	DAR; 29	HOM; 21	21st	2404	
2005	Deborah Renshaw	8	Dodge	DAY; 27	CAL; 20	ATL; 25	MAR; 28	GTY; 34	MFD; 34	CLT; DNQ	DOV; 12	TEX; 18	MCH; 21	MLW; 24	KAN; 26	KEN; 19	MEM; 24	IRP; 27	NSH; 26	BRI; 27	RCH; 35	NHA; 20	LVS; 25	MAR; 26	ATL; 24	TEX; 20	PHO; 31	HOM; 25	24th	2123	

==== Truck No. 18 history ====
The 18 truck became the team's first full-time entry into the Truck series. In 1999, Butch Miller was hired to drive the entry full-time with sponsorship from the Dana. Miller had posted four top-tens when he was hired to drive in the Busch Series. Joe Ruttman took over and had nine top-tens in the remaining sixteen races of the season. He opened the 2000 season with three straight poles and a win, and finished sixth in points. In 2001, he won an additional two races and ended the season third in points.

Ruttman left with Dana at the end of 2001, and Robert Pressley took over and won in his debut at Daytona. He followed it up with another win at Michigan and a seventh-place points finish. He left for HT Motorsports, and was replaced by Chad Chaffin. With Dickies sponsorship, Chaffin won two poles and finished tenth in points. He followed that up in 2004 with wins at Dover International Speedway and Indianapolis Raceway Park and another tenth-place points finish. Chase Montgomery took over the No. 18 in 2005, but did not post a top-ten and fell to 23rd in the standings. For 2006, Fastenal became the team's primary sponsor and Hamilton was slated to drive it. After three races, Hamilton was diagnosed with neck cancer and was forced to exit the ride. His son Bobby Hamilton Jr. took over for him. Hamilton Jr. won the pole at Martinsville in his first start in the truck and had a total of five top-ten finishes, finishing sixteenth in points. Ken Schrader was announced as the driver of the truck for the 2007 season, and has posted two top-five finishes. Ruttman drove the 18 in one race while filling in for Schrader, before Dennis Setzer took over the truck late in the season. Dennis drove the No. 18 full-time in 2008, with sponsorship from Dodge and Tahoe Smokeless. Setzer scored BHR-VA's final victory that year at the Kroger 250 and finished eighth in points with five top-fives and eight top tens.

==== Truck No. 18 results ====
NASCAR Craftsman Truck Series results
Year	Driver	No.	Make	1	2	3	4	5	6	7	8	9	10	11	12	13	14	15	16	17	18	19	20	21	22	23	24	25	NCTC	Pts	Ref
1999	Butch Miller	18	Dodge	HOM; 9	PHO; 26	EVG; 16	MMR; 9	MAR; 27	MEM; 10	PPR; 10	I70; 20	BRI; 13																	10th	3263	
1999	Joe Ruttman	18	Dodge										TEX; 11	PIR; 10	GLN; 25	MLW; 15	NSV; 4	NZH; 22	MCH; 5	NHA; 25	IRP; 10	GTY; 7	HPT; 7	RCH; 29	LVS; 23	LVL; 10	TEX; 7	CAL; 2	10th	3263	
2000	Joe Ruttman	18	Dodge	DAY; 19	HOM; 4	PHO; 1*	MMR; 16	MAR; 6	PIR; 12	GTY; 5	MEM; 19	PPR; 22	EVG; 3	TEX; 26	KEN; 25	GLN; 15	MLW; 24	NHA; 12	NZH; 2*	MCH; 14	IRP; 1*	NSV; 4	CIC; 1	RCH; 4	DOV; 17	TEX; 11	CAL; 3		6th	3278	
2001	Joe Ruttman	18	Dodge	DAY; 1*	HOM; 9	MMR; 6	MAR; 4	GTY; 12	DAR; 5	PPR; 1	DOV; 8	TEX; 4	MEM; 3	MLW; 6	KAN; 24	KEN; 2	NHA; 8	IRP; 3	NSH; 4	CIC; 8	NZH; 9	RCH; 9	SBO; 5	TEX; 9	LVS; 8	PHO; 12	CAL; 16		3rd	3570	
2002	Robert Pressley	18	Dodge	DAY; 1*	DAR; 2	MAR; 14	GTW; 31	PPR; 30	DOV; 2	TEX; 6	MEM; 12	MLW; 7	KAN; 7	KEN; 3	NHA; 9	MCH; 1*	IRP; 5	NSH; 9	RCH; 15	TEX; 7	SBO; 24	LVS; 7	CAL; 7	PHO; 14	HOM; 4				7th	3097	
2003	Chad Chaffin	18	Dodge	DAY; 17	DAR; 5	MMR; 20	MAR; 26*	CLT; 8	DOV; 7	TEX; 8	MEM; 28	MLW; 13	KAN; 14	KEN; 26	GTW; 13	MCH; 3	IRP; 12	NSH; 6	BRI; 7	RCH; 11	NHA; 6	CAL; 17	LVS; 18	SBO; 13	TEX; 15	MAR; 14	PHO; 18	HOM; 10	10th	3143	
2004	Chad Chaffin	18	Dodge	DAY; 13	ATL; 9	MAR; 10	MFD; 31	CLT; 30	DOV; 1	TEX; 5	MEM; 9	MLW; 2	KAN; 9	KEN; 5	GTW; 4	MCH; 11	IRP; 1	NSH; 12	BRI; 29	RCH; 22	NHA; 16	LVS; 16	CAL; 11	TEX; 16	MAR; 30	PHO; 30	DAR; 15	HOM; 15	10th	3122	
2005	Chase Montgomery	18	Dodge	DAY; 31	CAL; 29	ATL; 26	MAR; 30	GTY; 19	MFD; 24	CLT; 13	DOV; 18	TEX; 33	MCH; 20	MLW; 33	KAN; 20	KEN; 34	MEM; 25	IRP; 22	NSH; 22	BRI; 22	RCH; 22	NHA; 34	LVS; 19	MAR; 20	ATL; 31	TEX; 19	PHO; 26	HOM; 23	23rd	2230	
2006	Bobby Hamilton	18	Dodge	DAY; 21	CAL; 23	ATL; 14																							16th	2671	
2006	Bobby Hamilton Jr.	18	Dodge				MAR; 10	GTY; 7	CLT; 21	MFD; 18	DOV; 13	TEX; 25	MCH; 28	MLW; 31	KAN; 15	KEN; 24	MEM; 35	IRP; 31	NSH; 13	BRI; 9	NHA; 26	LVS; 26	TAL; 13	MAR; 32	ATL; 9	TEX; 12	PHO; 32	HOM; 4	16th	2671	
2007	Ken Schrader	18	Dodge	DAY; 34	CAL; 15	ATL; 14	MAR; 12		CLT; 12	MFD; 3	DOV; 33	TEX; 8	MCH; 30	MLW; 18	MEM; 18	KEN; 17	IRP; 5	NSH; 22	BRI; 18	GTY; 17	NHA; 17								13th	2804	
2007	Joe Ruttman	18	Dodge					KAN; 25																					13th	2804	
2007	Dennis Setzer	18	Dodge																			LVS; 7	TAL; 5	MAR; 10	ATL; 13	TEX; 15	PHO; 9	HOM; 29	13th	2804	
2008	Dennis Setzer	18	Dodge	DAY; 10	CAL; 16	ATL; 13	MAR; 1*	KAN; 25	CLT; 7	MFD; 34	DOV; 18	TEX; 11	MCH; 16	MLW; 11	MEM; 12	KEN; 4	IRP; 26	NSH; 18	BRI; 8	GTW; 2	NHA; 16	LVS; 16	TAL; 13	MAR; 2	ATL; 19	TEX; 13	PHO; 15	HOM; 5	8th	3197	

== Demise ==
At the close of the 2008 season, Dodge and Tahoe decided to no longer sponsor BHR-VA due to the struggling economy. During Speed's broadcast of the Ford 200 pit reporter Ray Dunlap reported that Setzer was looking for a ride for 2009. Lori Hamilton confirmed on November 24 that BHR-VA would cease all operations at the end of the week. One truck from the team’s stable, named “Freak”, which had won at Daytona three times, was used by HT Motorsports and Glenden Enterprises up until 2018.
