= 2006 NASCAR Craftsman Truck Series =

American motorsport season

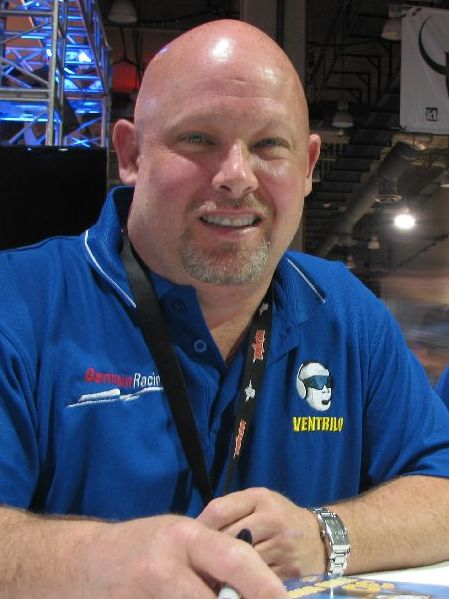
Todd Bodine, the 2006 Craftsman Truck Series champion.

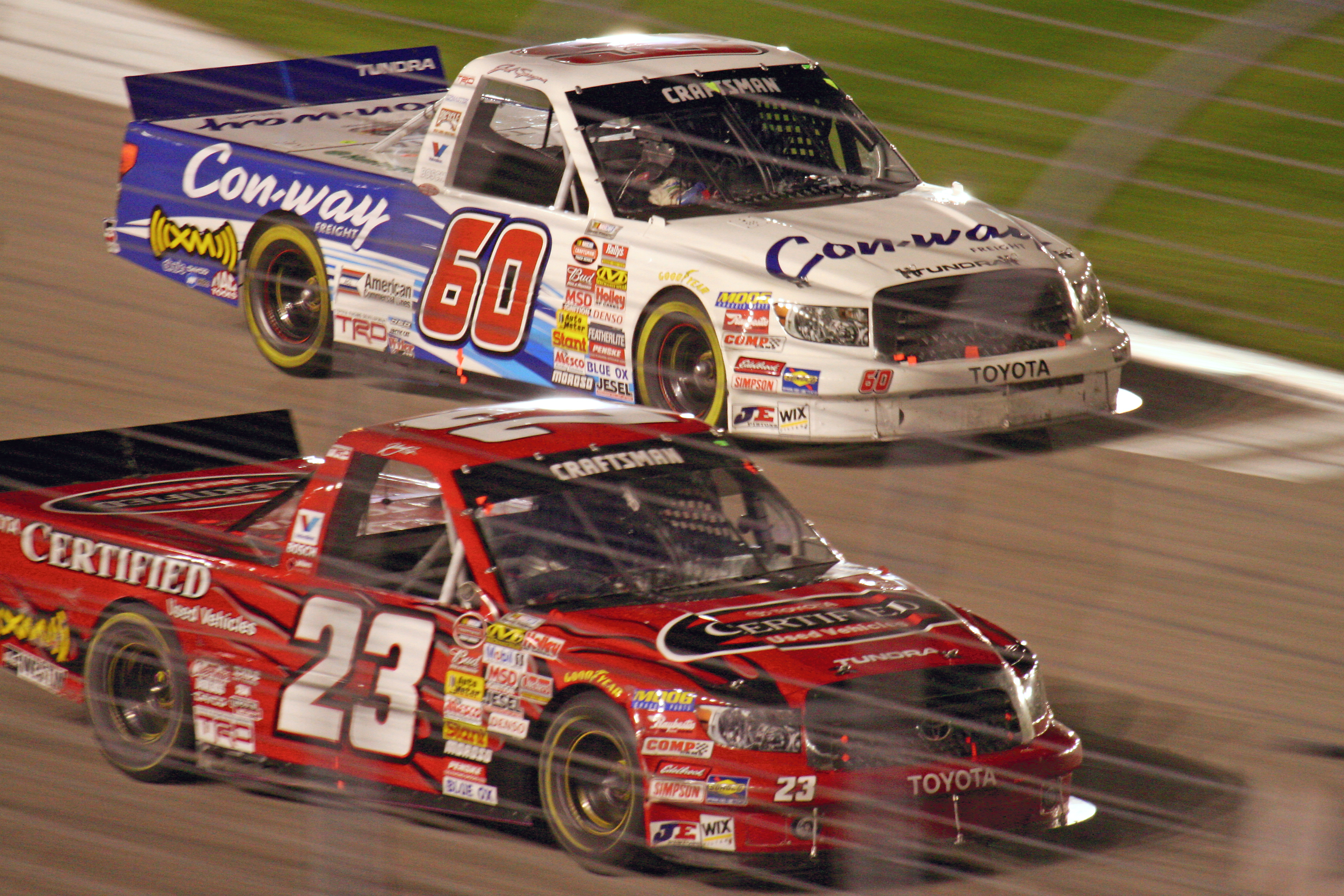
Johnny Benson, driving the No. 23 truck, shown here in 2007, finished second behind Bodine.

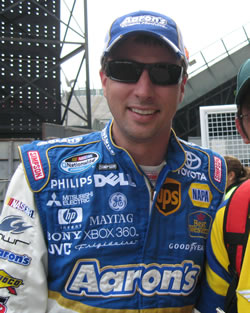
David Reutimann finished third in the championship.

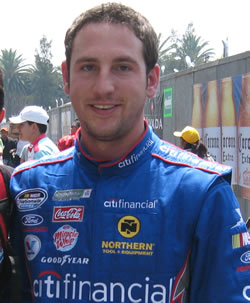
Erik Darnell, the Craftsman Truck Series Rookie of the Year.

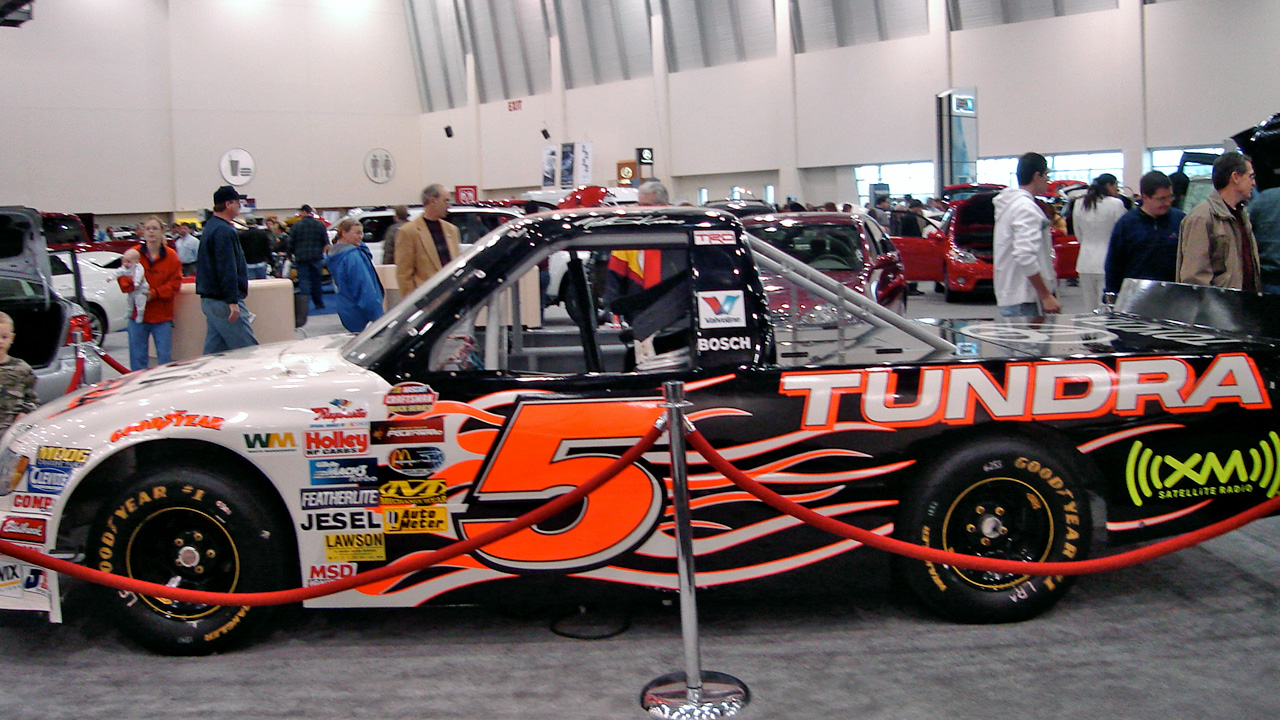
Toyota won the manufacturers' championship with 12 wins, the first international manufacturer to win the title in any series.

The 2006 NASCAR Craftsman Truck Series was the twelfth season of the Craftsman Truck Series, the third highest stock car racing series sanctioned by NASCAR in the United States. It was contested over twenty-five races, beginning with the GM Flex Fuel 250 at Daytona International Speedway and ending with the Ford 200 at Homestead-Miami Speedway. Todd Bodine of Germain Racing won the drivers' championship, making him the first driver to win a top-three NASCAR championship in a foreign make vehicle (Toyota).

== 2006 teams and drivers ==
=== Full-time teams ===
Manufacturer	Team	No.	Driver(s)	Crew chief
Chevrolet	Billy Ballew Motorsports	15	Kyle Krisiloff 12 (R)	Richie Wauters 19; Buddy Barnes 6
Chevrolet	Billy Ballew Motorsports	15	Kevin Grubb 4	Richie Wauters 19; Buddy Barnes 6
Chevrolet	Billy Ballew Motorsports	15	Kyle Busch 5	Richie Wauters 19; Buddy Barnes 6
Chevrolet	Billy Ballew Motorsports	15	Jeremy Mayfield 2	Richie Wauters 19; Buddy Barnes 6
Chevrolet	Billy Ballew Motorsports	15	Mike Wallace 2	Richie Wauters 19; Buddy Barnes 6
Chevrolet	Green Light Racing	07	Sean Murphy 3	Bobby Dotter 12; Greg Tester 1 Todd Brewer 2 Gene Christensen 1 Gary Roulo 1 Wayne Edwards 2
Chevrolet	Green Light Racing	07	Eric Norris 1	Bobby Dotter 12; Greg Tester 1 Todd Brewer 2 Gene Christensen 1 Gary Roulo 1 Wayne Edwards 2
Chevrolet	Green Light Racing	07	Clint Bowyer 1	Bobby Dotter 12; Greg Tester 1 Todd Brewer 2 Gene Christensen 1 Gary Roulo 1 Wayne Edwards 2
Chevrolet	Green Light Racing	07	Justin Martz 1	Bobby Dotter 12; Greg Tester 1 Todd Brewer 2 Gene Christensen 1 Gary Roulo 1 Wayne Edwards 2
Chevrolet	Green Light Racing	07	Johnny Chapman 2	Bobby Dotter 12; Greg Tester 1 Todd Brewer 2 Gene Christensen 1 Gary Roulo 1 Wayne Edwards 2
Chevrolet	Green Light Racing	07	Robert Turner 2	Bobby Dotter 12; Greg Tester 1 Todd Brewer 2 Gene Christensen 1 Gary Roulo 1 Wayne Edwards 2
Chevrolet	Green Light Racing	07	Kevin Lepage 2	Bobby Dotter 12; Greg Tester 1 Todd Brewer 2 Gene Christensen 1 Gary Roulo 1 Wayne Edwards 2
Chevrolet	Green Light Racing	07	Butch Miller 1	Bobby Dotter 12; Greg Tester 1 Todd Brewer 2 Gene Christensen 1 Gary Roulo 1 Wayne Edwards 2
Chevrolet	Green Light Racing	07	Chad McCumbee 2 (R)	Bobby Dotter 12; Greg Tester 1 Todd Brewer 2 Gene Christensen 1 Gary Roulo 1 Wayne Edwards 2
Chevrolet	Green Light Racing	07	Wayne Edwards 1	Bobby Dotter 12; Greg Tester 1 Todd Brewer 2 Gene Christensen 1 Gary Roulo 1 Wayne Edwards 2
Chevrolet	Green Light Racing	07	Travis Kittleson 3	Bobby Dotter 12; Greg Tester 1 Todd Brewer 2 Gene Christensen 1 Gary Roulo 1 Wayne Edwards 2
Chevrolet	Green Light Racing	07	T. J. Bell 1	Bobby Dotter 12; Greg Tester 1 Todd Brewer 2 Gene Christensen 1 Gary Roulo 1 Wayne Edwards 2
Chevrolet	Green Light Racing	07	John Mickel 5	Allen Mickel
Chevrolet	Kevin Harvick, Inc.	33	Ron Hornaday Jr.	Chris Rice; Stacy Johnson; Wally Rogers
Chevrolet	Key Motorsports	40	Chad Chaffin 6	Lance Hooper 3 Barry Dodson 22
Chevrolet	Key Motorsports	40	Ryan Moore 12	Lance Hooper 3 Barry Dodson 22
Chevrolet	Key Motorsports	40	Tim Fedewa 1	Lance Hooper 3 Barry Dodson 22
Chevrolet	Key Motorsports	40	Derrike Cope 2	Lance Hooper 3 Barry Dodson 22
Chevrolet	Key Motorsports	40	Shane Huffman 4	Lance Hooper 3 Barry Dodson 22
Chevrolet	Morgan-Dollar Motorsports	46 (Note: The team's entry at Atlanta and Martinsville in April (Races 3 and 4) were in a collaboration with K Automotive Racing. At that races, the team ran the No. 29 truck (K Automotive Racing's number))	Kraig Kinser (R) 19	Randy Goss 16; Eric Phillips 9
Chevrolet	Morgan-Dollar Motorsports	46	Clint Bowyer 2	Randy Goss 16; Eric Phillips 9
Chevrolet	Morgan-Dollar Motorsports	46	Joe Nemechek 3	Randy Goss 16; Eric Phillips 9
Chevrolet	Morgan-Dollar Motorsports	46	Denny Hamlin 1	Randy Goss 16; Eric Phillips 9
Chevrolet	Morgan-Dollar Motorsports	85	Dennis Setzer	Eric Phillips 16; Randy Goss 9
Chevrolet	Spears Motorsports	75	Aric Almirola (R)	Dave McCarty
Chevrolet	ThorSport Racing	13	Kerry Earnhardt (R)	Shane Tesch 2 Steve May 1 Lance Hooper 22
Chevrolet	ThorSport Racing	88	Matt Crafton	Bud Haefele
Chevrolet	Xpress Motorsports	16	Mike Bliss	Dave Fuge
Dodge	Bobby Hamilton Racing	4	Timothy Peters 16	Jerry McCormick 1 Kip McCord 6 Bob Bissinger 3 Randy Seals 2 Marcus Richmond 13
Dodge	Bobby Hamilton Racing	4	Bobby Labonte 1	Jerry McCormick 1 Kip McCord 6 Bob Bissinger 3 Randy Seals 2 Marcus Richmond 13
Dodge	Bobby Hamilton Racing	4	Chase Miller 8	Jerry McCormick 1 Kip McCord 6 Bob Bissinger 3 Randy Seals 2 Marcus Richmond 13
Dodge	Bobby Hamilton Racing	18	Bobby Hamilton 3	Danny Rollins 12; Kip McCord 13
Dodge	Bobby Hamilton Racing	18	Bobby Hamilton Jr. 22	Danny Rollins 12; Kip McCord 13
Dodge	Evernham Motorsports	98	Erin Crocker (R)	Dan Glauz 3 Ronnie Hornaday 1 Patrick Donahue 21
Dodge	Orleans Racing	77	Brendan Gaughan	Tony Liberati
Dodge	Woodard & Sharp Racing 4 Woodard Racing 21	25	Boston Reid 20 (R)	Patrick Donahue 4 Mark Nelson 12; Tim Weiss 6 Wayne Setterington Jr. 2
Dodge	Woodard & Sharp Racing 4 Woodard Racing 21	25	Damon Lusk 5	Patrick Donahue 4 Mark Nelson 12; Tim Weiss 6 Wayne Setterington Jr. 2
Ford	Circle Bar Racing	14	Rick Crawford	Kevin Starland
Ford	ppc Racing	10	Terry Cook	Dennis Connor
Ford	Roush Racing	6	Mark Martin 14	Mike Beam
Ford	Roush Racing	6	David Ragan 9	Mike Beam
Ford	Roush Racing	6	Auggie Vidovich 1	Mike Beam
Ford	Roush Racing	6	Peter Shepherd III 1	Mike Beam
Ford	Roush Racing	99	Erik Darnell (R)	John Quinn
Ford	Wood Brothers/JTG Racing	20	Jon Wood 2	John Monsam
Ford	Wood Brothers/JTG Racing	20	Bobby East 1 (R)	John Monsam
Ford	Wood Brothers/JTG Racing	20	Marcos Ambrose 22 (R)	John Monsam
Ford	Wood Brothers/JTG Racing	21	Stacy Compton 2	Gary Cogswell
Ford	Wood Brothers/JTG Racing	21	Jon Wood 1	Gary Cogswell
Ford	Wood Brothers/JTG Racing	21	Bobby East 22 (R)	Gary Cogswell
Toyota	Bill Davis Racing	5	Mike Skinner	Jeff Hensley
Toyota	Bill Davis Racing	22	Bill Lester	Doug Wolcott
Toyota	Bill Davis Racing	23	Johnny Benson	Rick Ren
Toyota	Darrell Waltrip Motorsports	17	David Reutimann	Jason Overstreet
Toyota	Germain Racing	9	Ted Musgrave	Tom Ackerman
Toyota	Germain Racing	30	Todd Bodine	Mike Hillman Jr.
Toyota	Red Horse Racing	11	David Starr	Jamie Jones
Toyota	Wyler Racing	60	Jack Sprague	Tony Furr
Chevrolet Dodge	Green Light Racing	08	Bobby Hamilton Jr. 3 (Note: Entries were fielded in a collaboration with Bobby Hamilton Racing.)	Danny Gill
Chevrolet Dodge	Green Light Racing	08	Butch Miller 1	Todd Brewer
Chevrolet Dodge	Green Light Racing	08	Boris Jurkovic 1	Bobby Dotter 4 Wayne Edwards 7 Gene Christensen 1 Kevin Cram 9
Chevrolet Dodge	Green Light Racing	08	Sean Murphy 1	Bobby Dotter 4 Wayne Edwards 7 Gene Christensen 1 Kevin Cram 9
Chevrolet Dodge	Green Light Racing	08	Mike Greenwell 2	Bobby Dotter 4 Wayne Edwards 7 Gene Christensen 1 Kevin Cram 9
Chevrolet Dodge	Green Light Racing	08	Johnny Chapman 1	Bobby Dotter 4 Wayne Edwards 7 Gene Christensen 1 Kevin Cram 9
Chevrolet Dodge	Green Light Racing	08	Chad McCumbee 15 (R)	Bobby Dotter 4 Wayne Edwards 7 Gene Christensen 1 Kevin Cram 9
Chevrolet Dodge	Green Light Racing	08	Chris Wimmer 1	Bobby Dotter 4 Wayne Edwards 7 Gene Christensen 1 Kevin Cram 9
Chevrolet Dodge	Richardson Racing	1	Robert Richardson Jr. (R)	Buddy Barnes 2 Wayne Setterington Jr. 5 Kevin Caldwell 18
Dodge Ford Toyota	HT Motorsports	59	Mike Wallace 2	Kevin Cram 14; Danny Rollins 11
Dodge Ford Toyota	HT Motorsports	59	Steve Park 10	Kevin Cram 14; Danny Rollins 11
Dodge Ford Toyota	HT Motorsports	59	Chad Chaffin 13	Kevin Cram 14; Danny Rollins 11

=== Part-time teams ===
Note: If under "team", the owner's name is listed and in italics, that means the name of the race team that fielded the truck is unknown.

Manufacturer	Team	No.	Driver(s)	Crew chief	Rounds
Chevrolet	Billy Ballew Motorsports	51	Kyle Busch	Richie Wauters	2
Chevrolet	Billy Ballew Motorsports	51	Martin Truex Jr.	Richie Wauters	1
Chevrolet	Billy Ballew Motorsports	51	Johnny Sauter	Richie Wauters	1
Chevrolet	FDNY Racing	28	Carl Long	Dick Rahilly	3
Chevrolet	Green Light Racing	03	Wayne Edwards	Gene Christensen	2
Chevrolet	Green Light Racing	03	Johnny Chapman	Gene Christensen	1
Chevrolet	Jeff Milburn Racing	76	Blake Mallory	Jeff Milburn	1
Chevrolet	Jeff Milburn Racing	76	Chase Montgomery	Jeff Milburn	1
Chevrolet	Jeff Milburn Racing	76	Chris Wimmer	Jeff Milburn	1
Chevrolet	Lafferty Motorsports	89	Norm Benning	Chris Lafferty	1
Chevrolet	Lafferty Motorsports	89	Chuck Maitlen	Chris Lafferty	2
Chevrolet	Lafferty Motorsports	89	Garrett Liberty	Chris Lafferty	1
Chevrolet	Mighty Motorsports	24	Wayne Edwards	Cliff Button	2
Chevrolet	MRD Motorsports	06	Chad McCumbee (R)	Bryan Berry	8
Chevrolet	Pennington Motorsports	7	Casey Kingsland	Gary Showalter	3
Chevrolet	Prime Development Group Racing	64	Jimmy Simpson	Robert McVay	1
Chevrolet	Stellar Quest Racing	91	J. C. Stout	Steve Mollnow	5
Chevrolet	Sutton Motorsports	02	Kelly Sutton	Gary Showalter	13
Chevrolet	Sutton Motorsports	02	Chad Chaffin	Gary Showalter	1
Chevrolet	Sutton Motorsports	02	Johnny Sauter	Gary Showalter	1
Chevrolet	Sutton Motorsports	02	Brad Keselowski	Gary Showalter	2
Chevrolet	ThorSport Racing	87	Willie Allen	Bob Good	1
Chevrolet	Tracy Cline	70	Tam Topham	Mark Prater	2
Dodge	Bobby Hamilton Racing (Note: Montgomery's No. 8 truck was run by this team under the name BHR2.)	04	Kevin Hamlin	Randy Seals 10; Bob Bissinger 4	1
Dodge	Bobby Hamilton Racing	04	Scott Lagasse Jr. (R)	Randy Seals 10; Bob Bissinger 4	10
Dodge	Bobby Hamilton Racing	04	David Stremme	Randy Seals 10; Bob Bissinger 4	1
Dodge	Bobby Hamilton Racing	04	Sammy Sanders	Randy Seals 10; Bob Bissinger 4	2
Dodge	Bobby Hamilton Racing	04	Timothy Peters	Sammy Sanders	1
Dodge	Bobby Hamilton Racing	8	Chase Montgomery	Jack Johnson 1 Scott Fetcho 1	2
Dodge	Brevak Racing	31	Nick Tucker	Joe Slonkasky	2
Dodge	Brevak Racing	31	Mike Wallace	Joe Slonkasky	1
Dodge	Trotter Racing	49	Bradley Riethmeyer	Gary Huffman	1
Ford	Roush Racing	50	David Ragan	Matt Puccia	10
Ford	Roush Racing	50	Michel Jourdain Jr.	Matt Puccia	9
Ford	Roush Racing	50	Carl Edwards	Matt Puccia	1
Ford	Roush Racing	50	Peter Shepherd III	Matt Puccia	2
Ford	K Automotive Racing	29	Brad Keselowski	Bob Keselowski	2
Ford	MB Motorsports	63	J. R. Patton	Mike Mittler	4
Ford	MB Motorsports	63	Justin Martz	Mike Mittler	1
Ford	MB Motorsports	63	Justin Allgaier	Mike Mittler	3
Ford	MB Motorsports	63	Brad Keselowski	Mike Mittler	2
Ford	MB Motorsports	63	Cameron Dodson	Mike Mittler	4
Ford	MB Motorsports	63	Scott Lynch	Mike Mittler	1
Ford	Tri-City Motorsports	19; 91	Todd Shafer	Carl Riggenbach	4
Ford	Wood Brothers/JTG Racing	19	Kelly Bires	Michael McSwain	1
Toyota	Darrell Waltrip Motorsports	12	Joey Miller (R)	Johnny Allen	15
Toyota	Darrell Waltrip Motorsports	12	Michael Waltrip	Johnny Allen	1
Toyota	Bill Davis Racing	24	A. J. Allmendinger	Ricky Viers	3
Toyota	Bill Davis Racing	24	Justin Labonte	Derrick Finley	1

== Schedule ==
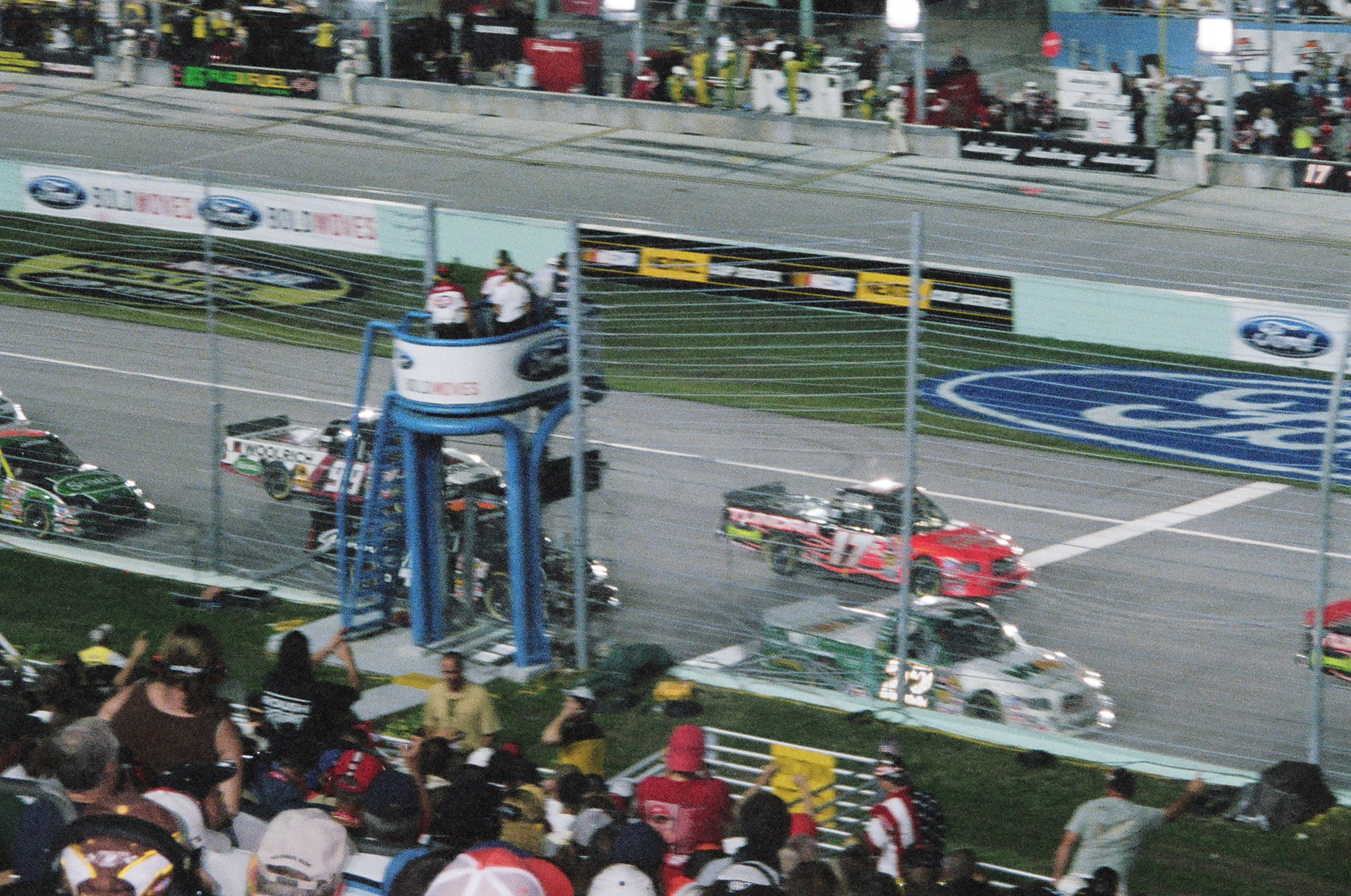
The field for the Ford 200 getting the one to go signal from the flag stand during pace laps before the race.

Speed Channel, an entity of Fox, was the exclusive broadcaster of the series for the 2006 season. (Starting in 2007, two of the 25 races, the spring race at Martinsville and Mansfield, would be aired on Fox with the remainder on Speed). All races were held in the United States and carried live on Speed, except for the race at Dover, which started at 4 pm EST but was aired on tape delay at 8 pm EST.

Note: All times are Eastern Time.

No.	Event	Venue	Date
1	GM FlexFuel 250	Daytona International Speedway	February 17
2	racetickets.com 200	California Speedway	February 24
3	John Deere 200	Atlanta Motor Speedway	March 17
4	Kroger 250	Martinsville Speedway	April 1
5	Missouri/Illinois Dodge Dealers Ram Tough 200	Gateway International Raceway	April 29
6	Quaker Steak & Lube 200	Lowe's Motor Speedway	May 19
7	City of Mansfield 250	Mansfield Motorsports Speedway	May 27
8	AAA Insurance 200	Dover International Speedway	June 2
9	Sam's Town 400	Texas Motor Speedway	June 9
10	Con-way Freight 200	Michigan International Speedway	June 17
11	Toyota Tundra Milwaukee 200	Milwaukee Mile	June 23
12	O'Reilly Auto Parts 250	Kansas Speedway	July 1
13	Built Ford Tough 225 presented by the Greater Cincinnati Ford Dealers	Kentucky Speedway	July 8
14	O'Reilly 200	Memphis Motorsports Park	July 15
15	Power Stroke Diesel 200 presented by Ford and International	O'Reilly Raceway Park	August 4
16	Toyota Tundra 200	Nashville Superspeedway	August 12
17	O'Reilly Auto Parts 200 presented by Valvoline	Bristol Motor Speedway	August 23
18	New Hampshire 200	New Hampshire International Speedway	September 16
19	Smith's Las Vegas 350	Las Vegas Motor Speedway	September 23
20	John Deere 250	Talladega Superspeedway	October 7
21	Kroger 200	Martinsville Speedway	October 21
22	EasyCare Vehicle Service Contracts 200	Atlanta Motor Speedway	October 28
23	Silverado 350K	Texas Motor Speedway	November 3
24	Casino Arizona 150	Phoenix International Raceway	November 10
25	Ford 200	Homestead-Miami Speedway	November 17

== Races ==
=== GM Flex Fuel 250 ===
The GM Flex Fuel 250 was held on February 17 at Daytona International Speedway. Mark Martin won the pole.

1. 6 - Mark Martin
2. 30 - Todd Bodine
3. 9 - Ted Musgrave
4. 5 - Mike Skinner
5. 60 - Jack Sprague
6. 99 - Erik Darnell
7. 08 - Bobby Hamilton Jr.
8. 14 - Rick Crawford
9. 17 - David Reutimann
10. 10 - Terry Cook

Failed to qualify: Chad McCumbee (#06), Chad Chaffin (#40), J. R. Patton (#63), Carl Long (#28), Wayne Edwards (#24), Norm Benning (#89)

=== racetickets.com 200 ===
This race was held February 24 at California Speedway. The polesitter was David Reutimann. Chad McCumbee, who finished 25th, suffered a 25-point penalty for an illegal modification of the carburetor's main body.

1. 6 - Mark Martin
2. 30 - Todd Bodine
3. 9 - Ted Musgrave
4. 17 - David Reutimann
5. 60 - Jack Sprague
6. 23 - Johnny Benson
7. 16 - Mike Bliss
8. 14 - Rick Crawford
9. 21 - Jon Wood
10. 85 - Dennis Setzer

Failed to qualify: Kraig Kinser (#47), Wayne Edwards (#24)

=== John Deere 200 ===
The John Deere 200 was held March 17 at Atlanta Motor Speedway. Todd Bodine sat on pole and the race win was determined by a green-white-checker finish for the third consecutive race. This race was the final career start for Bobby Hamilton, who retired after being diagnosed with neck cancer and died in January 2007.

Top ten results

1. 30 - Todd Bodine
2. 6 - Mark Martin
3. 23 - Johnny Benson
4. 9 - Ted Musgrave
5. 17 - David Reutimann
6. 21 - Jon Wood
7. 16 - Mike Bliss
8. 99 - Erik Darnell
9. 88 - Matt Crafton
10. 14 - Rick Crawford

Failed to qualify: Chad Chaffin (#40), Chase Montgomery (#8), Carl Long (#28)

- Chad Chaffin replaced Kelly Sutton in the #02 car in the race, after failing to qualify his #40.

=== Kroger 250 ===
This race was held April 1 at Martinsville Speedway. Bobby Hamilton Jr. won the pole.

Top ten results

1. 11 - David Starr
2. 9 - Ted Musgrave
3. 88 - Matt Crafton
4. 6 - Mark Martin
5. 16 - Mike Bliss
6. 77 - Brendan Gaughan
7. 07 - Clint Bowyer
8. 5 - Mike Skinner
9. 85 - Dennis Setzer
10. 18 - Bobby Hamilton Jr.

Failed to qualify: Tam Topham (#70), Chad Chaffin (#40), Justin Martz (#63).

=== Dodge Ram Tough 200 ===
April 29 at Gateway International Raceway. Qualifying was rained out and the field was set by owner's points. As a result, David Ragan sat on the pole.

Top ten results

1. 30 - Todd Bodine
2. 9 - Ted Musgrave
3. 17 - David Reutimann
4. 60 - Jack Sprague
5. 23 - Johnny Benson
6. 10 - Terry Cook
7. 18 - Bobby Hamilton Jr.
8. 11 - David Starr
9. 16 - Mike Bliss
10. 75 - Aric Almirola

Failed to qualify: J. R. Patton (#63), J. C. Stout (#91), Nick Tucker (#31)

=== Quaker Steak & Lube 200 ===
The Quaker Steak & Lube 200 was held May 19 at Lowe's Motor Speedway. Mike Skinner won the pole.

Top ten results

1. 51 - Kyle Busch
2. 10 - Terry Cook
3. 30 - Todd Bodine
4. 9 - Ted Musgrave
5. 33 - Ron Hornaday Jr.
6. 17 - David Reutimann
7. 85 - Dennis Setzer
8. 88 - Matt Crafton
9. 75 - Aric Almirola
10. 99 - Erik Darnell

Failed to qualify: Robert Richardson Jr. (#1), Chad Chaffin (#40), J. R. Patton (#63), Nick Tucker (#31), Bill Lester (#22)

=== City of Mansfield 250 ===
The City of Mansfield 250 was held May 27 at Mansfield Motorsports Speedway. Todd Bodine won the pole. Qualifying for this event was rained out. A series record of 18 caution flags was set during this running of the City of Mansfield 250.

Top ten results

1. 33 - Ron Hornaday Jr.
2. 60 - Jack Sprague
3. 11 - David Starr
4. 23 - Johnny Benson
5. 12 - Joey Miller
6. 88 - Matt Crafton
7. 85 - Dennis Setzer
8. 16 - Mike Bliss
9. 17 - David Reutimann
10. 59 - Steve Park

Failed to qualify: Michel Jourdain Jr. (#50), Todd Shafer (#91)

=== AAA Insurance 200 ===
The AAA Insurance 200 was held June 2 at Dover International Speedway. David Reutimann won the pole.

Top ten results

1. 6 - Mark Martin
2. 50 - Carl Edwards
3. 30 - Todd Bodine
4. 16 - Mike Bliss
5. 17 - David Reutimann
6. 23 - Johnny Benson
7. 33 - Ron Hornaday Jr.
8. 14 - Rick Crawford
9. 60 - Jack Sprague
10. 51 - Kyle Busch

Failed to qualify: Robert Richardson Jr. (#1), Ryan Moore (#40)

=== Sam's Town 400 ===
The Sam's Town 400 was held June 9 at Texas Motor Speedway. Mike Skinner won the pole.

Top ten results

1. 30 - Todd Bodine
2. 5 - Mike Skinner
3. 14 - Rick Crawford
4. 17 - David Reutimann
5. 23 - Johnny Benson
6. 85 - Dennis Setzer
7. 9 - Ted Musgrave
8. 6 - David Ragan
9. 08 - Chad McCumbee
10. 16 - Mike Bliss

Failed to qualify: J. R. Patton (#63), Blake Mallory (#76)

=== Con-way Freight 200 ===
This race was held June 17 at Michigan International Speedway. Mike Skinner won the pole. Johnny Benson captured his first Truck Series win and first NASCAR win in his home state.

Top ten results

1. 23 - Johnny Benson
2. 6 - Mark Martin
3. 4 - Bobby Labonte
4. 30 - Todd Bodine
5. 88 - Matt Crafton
6. 14 - Rick Crawford
7. 33 - Ron Hornaday Jr.
8. 85 - Dennis Setzer
9. 10 - Terry Cook
10. 60 - Jack Sprague

Failed to qualify: Robert Richardson Jr. (#1)

=== Toyota Tundra Milwaukee 200 ===
The Toyota Tundra Milwaukee 200 was held June 23 at The Milwaukee Mile. Ron Hornaday Jr. won the pole.

Top ten results

1. 23 - Johnny Benson
2. 16 - Mike Bliss
3. 33 - Ron Hornaday Jr.
4. 60 - Jack Sprague
5. 17 - David Reutimann
6. 4 - Timothy Peters
7. 85 - Dennis Setzer
8. 11 - David Starr
9. 14 - Rick Crawford
10. 10 - Terry Cook

Failed to qualify: Mike Wallace (#31), Michel Jourdain Jr. (#50)

=== O'Reilly Auto Parts 250 ===
This race was held July 1 at Kansas Speedway. Mike Skinner won the pole. This race was marred by a hard crash involving Kelly Sutton, who had to be extracted from her truck by medical personnel. Sutton would suffer a minor concussion, and would miss the next two races.

Top ten results:

1. 10 - Terry Cook*
2. 14 - Rick Crawford
3. 20 - Marcos Ambrose
4. 77 - Brendan Gaughan
5. 5 - Mike Skinner
6. 6 - David Ragan
7. 30 - Todd Bodine
8. 11 - David Starr
9. 23 - Johnny Benson
10. 17 - David Reutimann
- This would be Terry Cook's last career Truck Series victory, and his first since 2002.

Failed to qualify: none

=== Built Ford Tough 225 ===
This race was held July 8 at Kentucky Speedway. Marcos Ambrose won his first career pole. Unsponsored Ron Hornaday Jr. captured his second win of the year.

Top ten results:

1. 33 - Ron Hornaday Jr.
2. 14 - Rick Crawford
3. 77 - Brendan Gaughan
4. 23 - Johnny Benson
5. 6 - David Ragan
6. 9 - Ted Musgrave
7. 88 - Matt Crafton
8. 11 - David Starr
9. 99 - Erik Darnell
10. 30 - Todd Bodine
- Brad Keselowski replaced Kelly Sutton in the #02 truck for this race and the next race, as Sutton was still recovering from her crash at Kansas.

Failed to qualify: Robert Richardson Jr. (#1), Todd Shafer (#19)

=== O'Reilly 200 ===
The O'Reilly 200 was held July 15 at Memphis Motorsports Park. Jack Sprague won the pole.

Top ten results

1. 60 - Jack Sprague
2. 99 - Erik Darnell
3. 88 - Matt Crafton
4. 33 - Ron Hornaday Jr.
5. 16 - Mike Bliss
6. 6 - David Ragan
7. 17 - David Reutimann
8. 10 - Terry Cook
9. 5 - Mike Skinner
10. 85 - Dennis Setzer

Failed to qualify: none

=== Power Stroke Diesel 200 ===
The Power Stroke Diesel 200 was held August 4 at O'Reilly Raceway Park. David Ragan won the pole.

Top ten results

1. 14 - Rick Crawford*
2. 85 - Dennis Setzer
3. 33 - Ron Hornaday Jr.
4. 11 - David Starr
5. 16 - Mike Bliss
6. 10 - Terry Cook
7. 30 - Todd Bodine
8. 9 - Ted Musgrave
9. 6 - David Ragan
10. 99 - Erik Darnell
- This would be Crawford's last career Truck Series victory.

Failed to qualify: Chuck Maitlen (#89), Rick Craig (#31)-Withdrew

=== Toyota Tundra 200 ===
This race was held August 12 at Nashville Superspeedway. Erik Darnell won the pole.

Top ten results:

1. 23 - Johnny Benson
2. 60 - Jack Sprague
3. 20 - Marcos Ambrose
4. 9 - Ted Musgrave
5. 77 - Brendan Gaughan
6. 17 - David Reutimann
7. 08 - Chad McCumbee
8. 30 - Todd Bodine
9. 88 - Matt Crafton
10. 10 - Terry Cook

Failed to qualify: None

=== O'Reilly Auto Parts 200 presented by Valvoline ===
This race was held on August 23 at Bristol Motor Speedway. Mark Martin won the pole.

Top ten results:

1. #6 - Mark Martin
2. #30 - Todd Bodine
3. #9 - Ted Musgrave
4. #23 - Johnny Benson
5. #11 - David Starr
6. #15 - Kyle Busch
7. #5 - Mike Skinner
8. #16 - Mike Bliss
9. #18 - Bobby Hamilton Jr.
10. #17 - David Reutimann

Failed to qualify: Chuck Maitlen (#89)

=== New Hampshire 200 ===
The New Hampshire 200 was held September 16 at New Hampshire International Speedway. Mike Skinner won the pole.

Top ten results

1. #23 - Johnny Benson
2. #5 - Mike Skinner
3. #15 - Kyle Busch
4. #30 - Todd Bodine
5. #11 - David Starr
6. #33 - Ron Hornaday Jr.
7. #14 - Rick Crawford
8. #88 - Matt Crafton
9. #99 - Erik Darnell
10. #6 - Mark Martin

Failed to qualify: Garrett Liberty (#89)

=== Las Vegas 350 ===
The Las Vegas 350 was held September 23 at Las Vegas Motor Speedway. Mike Skinner won the pole.

Top ten results

1. #5 - Mike Skinner
2. #9 - Ted Musgrave
3. #16 - Mike Bliss
4. #23 - Johnny Benson
5. #33 - Ron Hornaday Jr.
6. #17 - David Reutimann
7. #20 - Marcos Ambrose
8. #85 - Dennis Setzer
9. #46 - Kraig Kinser
10. #75 - Aric Almirola

Failed to qualify: none

=== John Deere 250 ===
The John Deere 250 was held October 7 at Talladega Superspeedway. Mark Martin won the pole.

Top ten results:

1. 6 - Mark Martin
2. 5 - Mike Skinner
3. 9 - Ted Musgrave
4. 30 - Todd Bodine
5. 24 - A. J. Allmendinger
6. 17 - David Reutimann
7. 50 - David Ragan
8. 59 - Chad Chaffin
9. 23 - Johnny Benson
10. 33 - Ron Hornaday Jr.

Failed to qualify: none

=== Kroger 200 ===
The Kroger 200 was held October 21 at Martinsville Speedway. Jack Sprague won the pole.

Top ten results:

1. #60 - Jack Sprague
2. #11 - David Starr
3. #99 - Erik Darnell
4. #6 - Mark Martin
5. #23 - Johnny Benson
6. #15 - Kyle Busch
7. #5 - Mike Skinner
8. #46 - Denny Hamlin
9. #14 - Rick Crawford
10. #4 - Chase Miller

Failed to qualify: Bradley Riethmeyer (#49), Casey Kingsland (#7), Todd Shafer (#19), Jimmy Simpson (#64)

=== EasyCare 200 ===
The EasyCare Vehicle Service Contracts 200 was held October 28 at Atlanta Motor Speedway. Mike Skinner won the pole.

Top ten results:

1. 16 - Mike Bliss
2. 10 - Terry Cook
3. 99 - Erik Darnell
4. 17 - David Reutimann
5. 14 - Rick Crawford
6. 50 - David Ragan
7. 08 - Chad McCumbee
8. 5 - Mike Skinner
9. 18 - Bobby Hamilton Jr.
10. 60 - Jack Sprague

Failed to qualify: none

=== Silverado 350K ===
This race was held November 3 at Texas Motor Speedway. Clint Bowyer won the race from the pole.

Top ten results:

1. 46 - Clint Bowyer
2. 51 - Kyle Busch
3. 23 - Mike Skinner
4. 60 - Jack Sprague
5. 33 - Ron Hornaday Jr.
6. 6 - David Ragan
7. 17 - David Reutimann
8. 10 - Terry Cook
9. 99 - Erik Darnell
10. 20 - Marcos Ambrose

Failed to qualify: none

=== Casino Arizona 150 ===
The Casino Arizona 150 was held November 10 at Phoenix International Raceway. Johnny Benson won the pole. This race was unusual in that there was a short field starting this race (only 35 trucks started the race instead of the normal 36).

Top ten results:

1. #23 - Johnny Benson
2. #6 - Mark Martin
3. #5 - Mike Skinner
4. #30 - Todd Bodine
5. #88 - Matt Crafton
6. #11 - David Starr
7. #60 - Jack Sprague
8. #17 - David Reutimann
9. #15 - Kyle Busch
10. #99 - Erik Darnell

Failed to qualify: none

=== Ford 200 ===
This race will be held on November 17 at Homestead-Miami Speedway. Mike Skinner won the pole. Todd Bodine won the championship, and Erik Darnell won the Rookie of the Year.

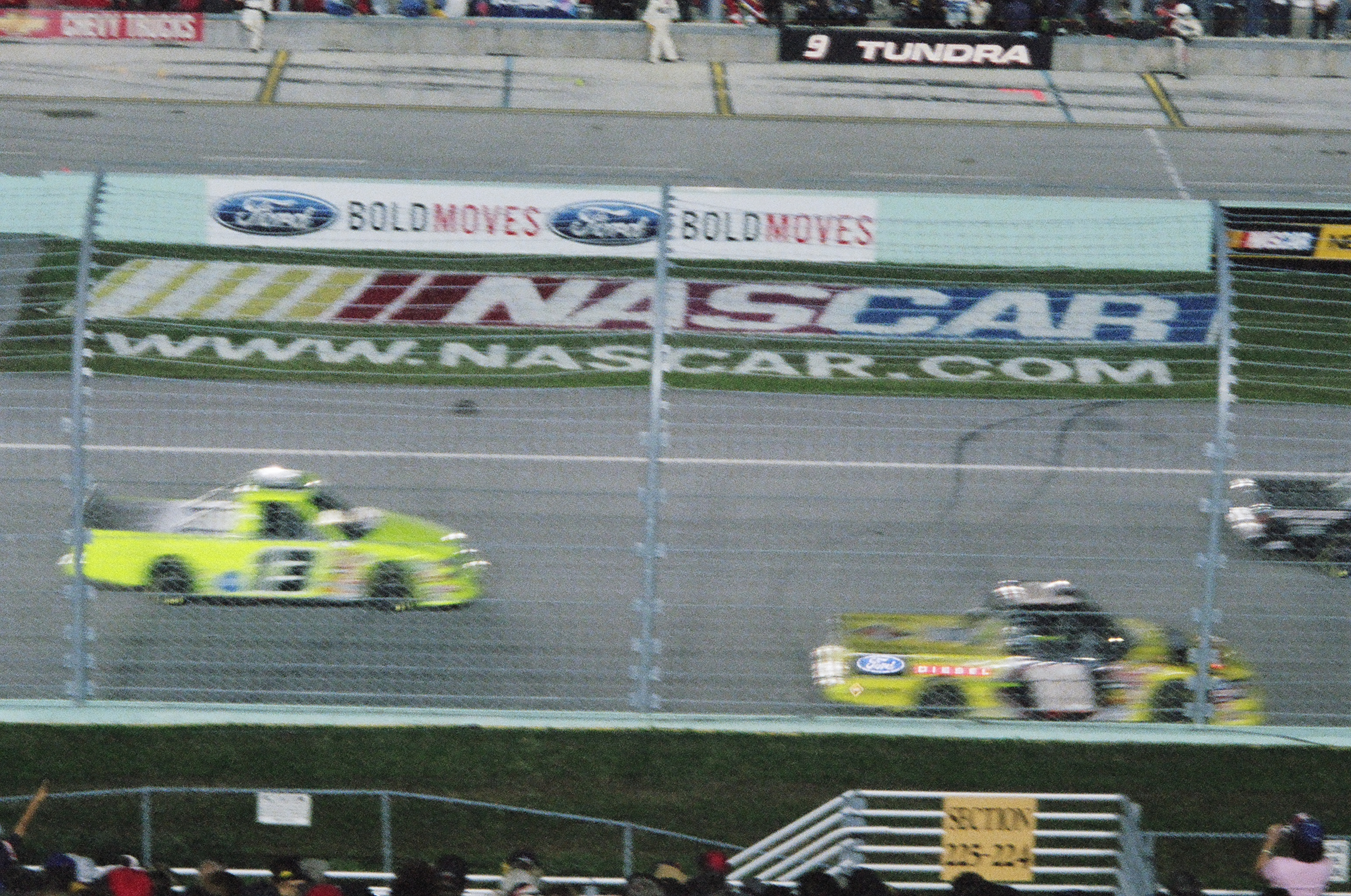
Terry Cook (10) and Kerry Earnhardt (13) line up before the Ford 200.

Top ten results:

1. #6 - Mark Martin
2. #77 - Brendan Gaughan
3. #99 - Erik Darnell
4. #18 - Bobby Hamilton Jr.
5. #60 - Jack Sprague
6. #46 - Joe Nemechek
7. #11 - David Starr
8. #17 - David Reutimann
9. #85 - Dennis Setzer
10. #10 - Terry Cook

Failed to qualify: Robert Richardson Jr. (#1)

== Full Drivers' Championship ==
(key) Bold – Pole position awarded by time. Italics – Pole position set by owner's points. * – Most laps led.

Pos	Driver	DAY	CAL	ATL	MAR	GTY	CLT	MFD	DOV	TEX	MCH	MIL	KAN	KEN	MEM	IRP	NSH	BRI	NHA	LVS	TAL	MAR	ATL	TEX	PHO	HOM	Points
1	Todd Bodine	2	2	**1**	12	1*	3	15*	3	1	4	20	7	10	15	7	8	2	4	12	4	14	25	14	4	21	3666
2	Johnny Benson	15	6	3	30	5	12	4	6	5	1	1	9	4	32	12	1	4	1*	4	9	5	29	31	**1**	26	3539
3	David Reutimann	9	**4**	5	15	3	6	9	**5**	4	15	5	10	12	7	34	6	10	12	6	6	18	4	7	8	8	3530
4	David Starr	14	12	15	1*	8	26	3	11	18	13	8	8	8	11	4	20	5	5	20	24	2	11	16	6	7	3355
5	Jack Sprague	5	5	17	17	4	34	2	9	11	10	4	29	11	**1***	28	2	23	18	13	33	**1***	10	4	7	5	3328
6	Ted Musgrave	3	3	4	2	2	4	16	18	7	23	24	22	6	19	8	4	3	31	2	3	15*	24	11	19	33	3314
7	Ron Hornaday Jr.	23	32	20	14	15	5	1*	7	15	7	**3***	12	1	4	3	33	27	6	5	10	13	13	5	13	14	3313
8	Terry Cook	10	14	12	19	6	2	22	16	16	9	10	1	16	8	6	10	21	22	16	14	17	2	8	14	10	3268
9	Rick Crawford	8	8	10	26	24	11	12	8	3	6	9	2	2	13	1*	28	13	7	14	15	9	5	33	33	15	3252
10	Mike Skinner	4	17	35	8	35	**31**	29	22	**2***	**11**	11	**5***	31	9	18	17*	7	**2**	**1***	2	7	**8**	3	3	**35**	3219
11	Mike Bliss	22	7	7	5	9	33	8	4	10	14	2	31	15	5	5	30	8	16	3	25	22	1*	27	11	30	3151
12	Erik Darnell **(R)**	6	11	8	11	31	10	13	25	35	12	27	26	9	2	10	**12**	18	9	17	19	3	3	9	10	3	3136
13	Dennis Setzer	13	10	11	9	23	7	7	20	6	8	7	11	20	10	2	35	14	14	8	11	23	14	32	12	9	3129
14	Matt Crafton	26	20	9	3	12	8	6	15	12	5	34	20	7	3	20	9	12	8	21	18	34	12	15	5	12	3102
15	Brendan Gaughan	24	36	13	6	14	14	17	19	26	16	19	4	3	17	16	5	17	34	15	12	19	26	17	21	2	2894
16	Bobby Hamilton Jr.	7	22	19	**10**	7	21	18	13	25	28	31	15	24	35	31	13	9	26	26	13	32	9	12	32	4	2671
17	Chad McCumbee **(R)**	DNQ	25	27	21	11	15	31	23	9	18	14	13	18	22	17	7	25	20	34	30	27	7	13	29	13	2515
18	Aric Almirola **(R)**	32	21	18	18	10	9	30	12	32	36	13	18	22	18	21	22	32	29	10	22	16	30	20	22	23	2471
19	Mark Martin	**1***	1*	2*	4		13		1*		2*							**1***	10		**1***	4	36		2*	1*	2313
20	Bill Lester	35	15	29	24	30	DNQ	24	30	22	33	15	23	28	25	14	21	16	35	19	31	12	22	21	20	11	2252
21	Marcos Ambrose **(R)**				33	34	36	23	26	27	26	18	3	**19***	34	22	3	26	23	7	17	25	16	10	15	27	2228
22	Kerry Earnhardt **(R)**	18	29	34	20	27	20	27	29	34	29	35	25	23	28	23	11	20	19	11	36	33	21	29	27	19	2199
23	Bobby East **(R)**			23	13	13	24	34	17	28	30	17	24	34	21	11	36	29	30	22	23	21	15	22	18	16	2186
24	David Ragan			22	34	28	25			8	19	30	6	5	6	**9**	34	15	11		7	20	6	6	17		2122
25	Erin Crocker **(R)**	27	27	26	25	22	18	28	24	33	24	25	16	27	30	27	29	35	32	24	20	26	23	36	16	34	2113
26	Boston Reid **(R)**	36	34	24	31	16	16	14	33	17	17	26	28	14	24	24	14	28	33	33	29						1792
27	Timothy Peters **(R)**	12	24	33	35	32	23	11	14	20	35	6	19	25	12	15	19	33									1672
28	Chad Chaffin	DNQ	18	21	DNQ	26	DNQ							17	29	32	15	11	27	25	8	11	32	19	23	36	1566
29	Kraig Kinser **(R)**	30	DNQ	28	29	17	19	35	31	36	22	28	35	35	27	13	23	24		9					24		1541
30	Robert Richardson Jr. **(R)**	17	33	30	33	36	DNQ	33	DNQ	23	DNQ	33	27	DNQ	36	30	27	36	36	28	16	24	27	28	34	DNQ	1514
31	Joey Miller **(R)**	33	13	36	16	29	22	5	32	30	20	23	30	13	20			19									1429
32	Kyle Busch						1*		10*									6	3			6		2	9		1107
33	Kyle Krisiloff	28	19	16	23	33	17	25	27	19	32	29	17														1106
34	Kelly Sutton	29	28	QL		19	27	21	36	24	25	32	36			25	26										977
35	Steve Park			25	36	18	28	10	21	21	31	16	14														971
36	Ryan Moore **(R)**							36	DNQ	14	27	21	34	32	31	35	18	31	15								911
37	Scott Lagasse Jr. **(R)**		30	31		21	32	20	35	29					26						34		18				741
38	Chase Miller																		17	32	21	10	33	30	35	32	675
39	Michel Jourdain Jr.							DNQ		13		DNQ	32	26		19				30				24		31	616
40	Brad Keselowski	34	16											30	16			34								24	521
41	Damon Lusk																					36	17	18	26	18	470
42	Clint Bowyer				7														25					**1***			434
43	John Mickel																					31	20	25	25	29	430
44	Jon Wood	16	9	6																							408
45	Kevin Grubb													21	14	33	24										376
46	A. J. Allmendinger																		13		5		34				350
47	Mike Wallace	31	31									DNQ									26					22	327
48	Shane Huffman																					35		26	28	20	325
49	Bobby Hamilton	21	23	14																							315
50	Sean Murphy	20		32			30														32						315
51	Cameron Dodson															29			24			30			30		313
52	J. C. Stout					DNQ								29			32		28			28					301
53	Joe Nemechek																				28		35			6	292
54	Peter Shepherd III														23		31			18							273
55	Travis Kittleson																16	30		31							263
56	Justin Allgaier											22	21	36													252
57	Johnny Sauter				22							12															224
58	Johnny Chapman						29		34				33											35			201
59	Chase Montgomery	19		DNQ																27							188
60	Sammy Sanders																25	22									185
61	Kevin Lepage								28		21																179
62	Stacy Compton	25	26																								173
63	Carl Edwards								2																		170
64	Bobby Labonte										3																170
65	Jeremy Mayfield																			23			31				164
66	Derrike Cope																				27		28				161
67	Robert Turner							32								26											152
68	Butch Miller				27					31																	152
69	Mike Greenwell							26							33												149
70	Casey Kingsland																					DNQ			31	28	149
71	Denny Hamlin																					8					142
72	Kevin Hamlin	11																									135
73	Chris Wimmer											36												34			116
74	Michael Waltrip																									17	112
75	Auggie Vidovich							19																			106
76	Kelly Bires																						19				106
77	T. J. Bell																		21								105
78	Justin Martz				DNQ	20																					103
79	Justin Labonte																							23			94
80	Boris Jurkovic					25																					88
81	Tim Fedewa																			29							76
82	Tam Topham				DNQ																	29					76
83	David Stremme				32																						67
84	Wayne Edwards	DNQ	DNQ											33						36	35						64
85	Martin Truex Jr.										34																61
86	Eric Norris		35																								58
87	Carl Long	DNQ		DNQ			35																				58
88	Scott Lynch																			35							58
89	Willie Allen																									25	
90	Todd Shafer							DNQ						DNQ		36						DNQ					
91	Norm Benning	DNQ																									
92	J. R. Patton	DNQ				DNQ	DNQ			DNQ																	
93	Nick Tucker					DNQ	DNQ																				
94	Blake Mallory									DNQ																	
95	Chuck Maitlen															DNQ		DNQ									
96	Garrett Liberty																		DNQ								
97	Jimmy Simpson																					DNQ					
98	Bradley Riethmeyer																					DNQ					
99	Rick Craig															Wth											
Pos	Driver	DAY	CAL	ATL	MAR	GTY	CLT	MFD	DOV	TEX	MCH	MIL	KAN	KEN	MEM	IRP	NSH	BRI	NHA	LVS	TAL	MAR	ATL	TEX	PHO	HOM	Points

== Rookie of the Year ==
Erik Darnell of Roush Racing took home ROTY honors. Despite missing the season opener at Daytona and switching teams after Dover, Chad McCumbee was runner up in the ROTY fight. Finishing a surprising 3rd in ROTY was former V8 Supercars driver Marcos Ambrose, who missed the first three races of the season. Joe Gibbs Racing development driver Aric Almirola was fourth and rounding out the top five was Bobby East. Third generation driver Kerry Earnhardt and female driver Erin Crocker were expected to make runs for the title, but did not perform to expectation. Rookies such as Boston Reid, Joey Miller and Timothy Peters all attempted ROTY but were released from their rides.

== See also ==
- 2006 NASCAR Nextel Cup Series
- 2006 NASCAR Busch Series
- 2006 ARCA Re/Max Series
- 2006 NASCAR Whelen Modified Tour
- 2006 NASCAR Whelen Southern Modified Tour
