= Sammy Sanders =

American racing driver

Sammy Sanders (born July 17, 1967) is an American former NASCAR driver from Mount Juliet, Tennessee. He last drove the No. 04 Camp Courageous Dodge for Bobby Hamilton Racing on occasion in the Craftsman Truck Series. He has a couple of Busch Series starts in his career as well.

== Racing career ==
=== Busch Series ===
Sanders has made three NASCAR Busch Series starts in his career, all of which came in the 2001 series. Driving for Day Racing Enterprises, Sanders started 38th at Rockingham in his debut. He would finish the race, despite being twelve laps down in 36th. Then, Sanders went to Las Vegas and Bristol. It was the same song both times, as Sanders started and finished 41st falling out of the event early.

== Craftsman Truck Series ==
Sanders started 34th at Kentucky Speedway in 2001, his first career race in NASCAR Craftsman Truck Series. Driving for Bobby Hamilton Racing, Sanders would finish 34th with electrical problems. Sanders would make one more start for BHR in 2001, finishing 31st at Nazareth. Then, Sanders moved to Team Rensi Motorsports for the 2001 finale at California. It was a poor showing, though, for Sanders' team after an engine forced him to last (36th) in the event.

Sanders returned to the series in 2004, driving for HT Motorsports at Texas Motor Speedway. Starting the event in 35th, Sanders finished his first race in good fashion, on the lead lap. Sanders would go on to finish twenty-second in the event.

In 2006, Bobby Hamilton Racing announced that Sanders would drive the No. 04 Dodge in three events through the 2006. He earned a career best 30th place start in his season debut at Nashville and then finished 25th. As stated, Sanders would be in two more races on the year.

=== ARCA Racing Series ===
Sanders attempted four races in the ARCA Bondo/Mar-Hyde Series in the 2000 season, driving the No. 31 Chevrolet but he failed to qualify in all of them.

=== NASCAR Southeast Series ===
Sanders attempted four races in the NASCAR Southeast Series, all of them in his home track, at Nashville Fairgrounds, he failed to qualify in 1992, and made the event in 1995, 1996 and 2000. His best finish was 20th in 2000.
