= 2006 Golden Corral 500 =

Race details
- Race 4 of 36 in the 2006 NASCAR Nextel Cup Series season
- 2006 Golden Corral 500 program cover
- Date: March 20, 2006
- Official name: Golden Corral 500
- Location: Atlanta Motor Speedway, Hampton, Georgia
- Course: Permanent racing facility
- Course length: 1.54 miles (2.48 km)
- Distance: 325 laps, 500.5 mi (805.476 km)
- Weather: Cold with temperatures approaching 59 °F (15 °C); wind speeds up to 8.9 miles per hour (14.3 km/h)
- Average speed: 144.098 miles per hour (231.903 km/h)

Pole position
| Driver | Kasey Kahne | Evernham Motorsports |

Most laps led
| Driver | Greg Biffle | Roush Racing |
- Laps: 128

Winner
| No. 9 | Kasey Kahne | Evernham Motorsports |

Television in the United States
- Network: Fox Broadcasting Company
- Announcers: Mike Joy, Darrell Waltrip and Larry McReynolds

The 2006 Golden Corral 500 was the fourth race in the 2006 NASCAR Nextel Cup season which took place on March 20, 2006, at Atlanta Motor Speedway. Rain showers forced the green flag to be moved back to Monday. Television coverage moved to cable's FX channel for the race (with some exceptions).

== Race recap ==
Kasey Kahne sat on the pole with a speed of 192.553 mph, edging Ryan Newman by .002 seconds. Bill Lester qualified 19th in the #23 Dodge Charger, becoming the first African-American to start a NASCAR Nextel Cup race since 1986. He finished 38th, six laps down.

For the first time during the season there were no extra laps at the end of the race. Last year's Atlanta winner, Carl Edwards eliminated himself from contention early. He damaged the front end of the 99 car after hitting Dave Blaney on pit road on lap 45 during a caution to address the stopped car of Kyle Busch. Bobby Labonte ran in the top 10 for the first 50 laps before his engine failed on lap 55. Another scary incident took place on pit road during the sixth caution of the day (laps 189–197), when Reed Sorenson hit John Slusher, catch can man for Robby Gordon's crew, as he pulled out of his pit stall. Slusher was attached to a backboard but treated at the infield care center.

Several rookies had good days at Atlanta. Paul Menard and Reed Sorenson finished in the top ten, and Denny Hamlin led 16 laps. He was forced to make an unscheduled pit stop because of a loose condition, and finished 31st.

On the track, the 9 car was near the front all day. Kahne took the lead from Greg Biffle with 79 laps to go. Despite a challenge from Mark Martin, Kahne was not seriously challenged down the stretch and visited victory lane for the second time in his career. Kahne was the first driver to win from the pole since Matt Kenseth in the 2005 Sharpie 500.

== Qualifying ==
| Pos | Car # | Driver | Make | Speed | Time | Behind |
|---|---|---|---|---|---|---|
| 1 | 9 | Kasey Kahne | Dodge | 192.553 | 28.792 | 0.000 |
| 2 | 12 | Ryan Newman | Dodge | 192.540 | 28.794 | -0.002 |
| 3 | 31 | Jeff Burton | Chevrolet | 191.973 | 28.879 | -0.087 |
| 4 | 43 | Bobby Labonte | Dodge | 191.914 | 28.888 | -0.096 |
| 5 | 18 | J. J. Yeley | Chevrolet | 191.854 | 28.897 | -0.105 |
| 6 | 29 | Kevin Harvick | Chevrolet | 191.794 | 28.906 | -0.114 |
| 7 | 11 | Denny Hamlin | Chevrolet | 191.695 | 28.921 | -0.129 |
| 8 | 16 | Greg Biffle | Ford | 191.496 | 28.951 | -0.159 |
| 9 | 2 | Kurt Busch | Dodge | 191.357 | 28.972 | -0.180 |
| 10 | 42 | Casey Mears | Dodge | 191.245 | 28.989 | -0.197 |
| 11 | 6 | Mark Martin | Ford | 190.968 | 29.031 | -0.239 |
| 12 | 24 | Jeff Gordon | Chevrolet | 190.962 | 29.032 | -0.240 |
| 13 | 1 | Joe Nemechek | Chevrolet | 190.922 | 29.038 | -0.246 |
| 14 | 48 | Jimmie Johnson | Chevrolet | 190.817 | 29.054 | -0.262 |
| 15 | 41 | Reed Sorenson | Dodge | 190.804 | 29.056 | -0.264 |
| 16 | 07 | Clint Bowyer | Chevrolet | 190.765 | 29.062 | -0.270 |
| 17 | 5 | Kyle Busch | Chevrolet | 190.633 | 29.082 | -0.290 |
| 18 | 99 | Carl Edwards | Ford | 190.568 | 29.092 | -0.300 |
| 19 | 23 | Bill Lester | Dodge | 190.502 | 29.102 | -0.310 |
| 20 | 19 | Jeremy Mayfield | Dodge | 189.928 | 29.190 | -0.398 |
| 21 | 20 | Tony Stewart | Chevrolet | 189.895 | 29.195 | -0.403 |
| 22 | 15 | Paul Menard | Chevrolet | 189.785 | 29.212 | -0.420 |
| 23 | 61 | Kevin Lepage | Ford | 189.720 | 29.222 | -0.430 |
| 24 | 55 | Michael Waltrip | Dodge | 189.649 | 29.233 | -0.441 |
| 25 | 21 | Ken Schrader | Ford | 189.441 | 29.265 | -0.473 |
| 26 | 8 | Dale Earnhardt Jr. | Chevrolet | 189.396 | 29.272 | -0.480 |
| 27 | 17 | Matt Kenseth | Ford | 189.357 | 29.278 | -0.486 |
| 28 | 38 | Elliott Sadler | Ford | 189.286 | 29.289 | -0.497 |
| 29 | 10 | Scott Riggs | Dodge | 189.131 | 29.313 | -0.521 |
| 30 | 22 | Dave Blaney | Dodge | 189.092 | 29.319 | -0.527 |
| 31 | 88 | Dale Jarrett | Ford | 188.552 | 29.403 | -0.611 |
| 32 | 45 | Kyle Petty | Dodge | 188.398 | 29.427 | -0.635 |
| 33 | 14 | Sterling Marlin | Chevrolet | 188.398 | 29.427 | -0.635 |
| 34 | 26 | Jamie McMurray | Ford | 188.341 | 29.436 | -0.644 |
| 35 | 1 | Martin Truex Jr. | Chevrolet | 188.264 | 29.448 | -0.656 |
| 36 | 7 | Robby Gordon | Chevrolet | 188.162 | 29.464 | -0.672 |
| 37 | 25 | Brian Vickers | Chevrolet | 188.041 | 29.483 | -0.691 |
| 38 | 40 | David Stremme | Dodge | 187.970 | 29.494 | -0.702 |
| 39 | 66 | Jeff Green | Chevrolet | 187.843 | 29.514 | -0.722 |
| 40 | 49 | Brent Sherman | Dodge | 187.614 | 29.550 | -0.758 |
| 41 | 00 | Hermie Sadler | Ford | 187.304 | 29.599 | -0.807 |
| 42 | 4 | Scott Wimmer | Chevrolet | 187.139 | 29.625 | -0.833 |
| 43 | 96 | Terry Labonte | Chevrolet | | 29.902 | |
Failed to qualify
| 44 | 51 | Mike Garvey | Chevrolet | | 29.651 | |
| 45 | 95 | Stanton Barrett | Chevrolet | | 29.862 | |
| 46 | 34 | Chad Chaffin | Chevrolet | | 29.895 | |
| 47 | 74 | Derrick Cope | Dodge | | 29.898 | |
| 48 | 78 | Kenny Wallace | Chevrolet | | 29.899 | |
| 49 | 32 | Travis Kvapil | Chevrolet | | 29.980 | |
| 50 | 37 | Mike Skinner | Dodge | | 30.039 | |
| 51 | 13 | Greg Sacks | Ford | | 30.110 | |
| 52 | 92 | Chad Blount | Chevrolet | | 30.919 | |

== Race results ==
| Fin | St | Car # | Driver | Make | Points | Bonus | Laps | Winnings |
|---|---|---|---|---|---|---|---|---|
| 1 | 1 | 9 | Kasey Kahne | Dodge | 185 | 5 | 325 | $197,664 |
| 2 | 11 | 6 | Mark Martin | Ford | 170 | | 325 | $127,800 |
| 3 | 26 | 8 | Dale Earnhardt Jr. | Chevrolet | 165 | | 325 | $138,841 |
| 4 | 12 | 24 | Jeff Gordon | Chevrolet | 165 | 5 | 325 | $137,236 |
| 5 | 21 | 20 | Tony Stewart | Chevrolet | 160 | 5 | 325 | $154,961 |
| 6 | 14 | 48 | Jimmie Johnson | Chevrolet | 150 | | 325 | $121,761 |
| 7 | 22 | 15 | Paul Menard | Chevrolet | 146 | | 325 | $78,625 |
| 8 | 32 | 45 | Kyle Petty | Dodge | 142 | | 325 | $108,133 |
| 9 | 31 | 88 | Dale Jarrett | Ford | 138 | | 325 | $109,850 |
| 10 | 15 | 41 | Reed Sorenson * | Dodge | 134 | | 325 | $89,225 |
| 11 | 29 | 10 | Scott Riggs | Dodge | 130 | | 325 | $74,650 |
| 12 | 17 | 5 | Kyle Busch | Chevrolet | 127 | | 325 | $88,025 |
| 13 | 27 | 17 | Matt Kenseth | Ford | 124 | | 325 | $118,616 |
| 14 | 34 | 26 | Jamie McMurray | Ford | 121 | | 325 | $108,350 |
| 15 | 5 | 18 | J. J. Yeley * | Chevrolet | 118 | | 325 | $109,050 |
| 16 | 8 | 16 | Greg Biffle | Ford | 125 | 10 | 325 | $104,175 |
| 17 | 13 | 1 | Joe Nemechek | Chevrolet | 112 | | 325 | $99,020 |
| 18 | 2 | 12 | Ryan Newman | Dodge | 114 | 5 | 325 | $115,033 |
| 19 | 35 | 1 | Martin Truex Jr. * | Chevrolet | 106 | | 324 | $92,608 |
| 20 | 24 | 55 | Michael Waltrip | Dodge | 108 | 5 | 324 | $85,158 |
| 21 | 10 | 42 | Casey Mears | Dodge | 100 | | 324 | $105,908 |
| 22 | 43 | 96 | Terry Labonte | Chevrolet | 102 | 5 | 324 | $67,850 |
| 23 | 37 | 25 | Brian Vickers | Chevrolet | 94 | | 324 | $80,200 |
| 24 | 25 | 21 | Ken Schrader | Ford | 91 | | 324 | $98,164 |
| 25 | 3 | 31 | Jeff Burton | Chevrolet | 93 | 5 | 324 | $97,870 |
| 26 | 39 | 66 | Jeff Green | Chevrolet | 85 | | 324 | $90,033 |
| 27 | 16 | 07 | Clint Bowyer * | Chevrolet | 82 | | 324 | $78,060 |
| 28 | 36 | 7 | Robby Gordon | Chevrolet | 79 | | 324 | $69,810 |
| 29 | 28 | 38 | Elliott Sadler | Ford | 76 | | 324 | $97,433 |
| 30 | 42 | 4 | Scott Wimmer | Chevrolet | 73 | | 323 | $69,900 |
| 31 | 7 | 11 | Denny Hamlin * | Chevrolet | 75 | 5 | 323 | $70,125 |
| 32 | 30 | 22 | Dave Blaney | Dodge | 67 | | 323 | $75,797 |
| 33 | 38 | 40 | David Stremme * | Dodge | 64 | | 322 | $75,125 |
| 34 | 33 | 14 | Sterling Marlin | Chevrolet | 61 | | 322 | $66,130 |
| 35 | 23 | 61 | Kevin Lepage | Ford | 63 | 5 | 322 | $66,190 |
| 36 | 40 | 49 | Brent Sherman * | Dodge | 55 | | 322 | $66,055 |
| 37 | 9 | 2 | Kurt Busch | Dodge | 57 | 5 | 321 | $99,153 |
| 38 | 19 | 23 | Bill Lester | Dodge | PE | | 319 | $65,985 |
| 39 | 6 | 29 | Kevin Harvick | Chevrolet | 46 | | 313 | $102,876 |
| 40 | 18 | 99 | Carl Edwards | Ford | 43 | | 313 | $85,700 |
| 41 | 20 | 19 | Jeremy Mayfield | Dodge | 40 | | 235 | $95,846 |
| 42 | 41 | 0 | Hermie Sadler | Ford | 37 | | 166 | $65,815 |
| 43 | 4 | 43 | Bobby Labonte | Dodge | 39 | 5 | 56 | $103,725 |

Failed to qualify: Mike Garvey (#51), Stanton Barrett (#95), Chad Chaffin (#34), Derrike Cope (#74), Kenny Wallace (#78), Travis Kvapil (#32), Mike Skinner (#37), Greg Sacks (#13), Chad Blount (#92)

| Previous race: 2006 UAW-DaimlerChrysler 400 | Nextel Cup Series; 2006 season | Next race: 2006 Food City 500 |
