= Ohio 250 =

NASCAR truck race at Mansfield Motorsports Park

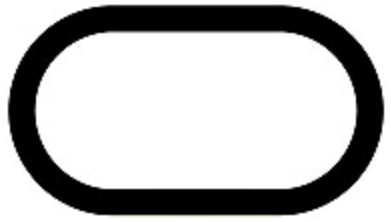

NASCAR Craftsman Truck Series
- Venue: Mansfield Motorsports Park
- Location: Mansfield, Ohio, United States
- First race: 2004
- Last race: 2008
- Distance: 110 miles (177.03 km)
- Laps: 250
- Previous names: UAW / GM Ohio 250 (2004–2005); City of Mansfield 250 (2006); Ohio 250 (2007–2008)
- Most wins (manufacturer): Chevrolet (4)

Circuit information
- Surface: Asphalt
- Length: 0.44 mi (0.71 km)
- Turns: 4

The Ohio 250 was a NASCAR Craftsman Truck Series race that was held at Mansfield Motorsports Park on Memorial Day weekend between 2004 and 2008.

== History ==
The 2006 race saw 18 caution flags flown during the race, setting a series record. Dennis Setzer won the 2007 race without making a fuel stop, which took place with a 22-gallon fuel cell. This race took over seven hours to run due to three rain delays and was the final Craftsman Truck Series victory for Spears Motorsports, who ceased operations following the 2007 season.

The 2008 edition was won by Donny Lia, who became the first rookie in nearly five seasons to win a Craftsman Truck Series race. The race was formerly known as the UAW/GM Ohio 250. General Motors operated a plant in Mansfield and a number of its residents used to work there. Appropriately, Chevrolet has won four of the five races, with Bobby Hamilton giving Dodge its only Mansfield victory in 2005. NASCAR announced it will not return to Mansfield for 2009, replacing the race with one to be held at Iowa Speedway.

== Past winners ==
Year	Date	No.	Driver	Team	Manufacturer	Race distance		Race time	Average speed (mph)	Report	Ref
Year	Date	No.	Driver	Team	Manufacturer	Laps	Miles (km)	Race time	Average speed (mph)	Report	Ref
2004	May 16	16	Jack Sprague	Xpress Motorsports	Chevrolet	252*	110.88 (178.444)	2:02:43	54.706	Report	
2005	May 15	04	Bobby Hamilton*	Bobby Hamilton Racing	Dodge	254*	111.76 (179.86)	1:55:37	65.907	Report	
2006	May 27	33	Ron Hornaday Jr.	Kevin Harvick Inc.	Chevrolet	250	110 (177.027)	1:59:03	62.999	Report	
2007	May 26	75	Dennis Setzer	Spears Motorsports	Chevrolet	250	110 (177.027)	2:11:51	52.873	Report	
2008	May 24	71	Donny Lia	TRG Motorsports	Chevrolet	250	110 (177.027)	1:59:58	62.517	Report	

- 2004 and 2005: Race extended due to a green–white–checker finish; 2005 marked Hamilton's last NASCAR win before his death in early 2007.

=== Manufacturer wins ===
# Wins	Make	Years won
4	(United States) Chevrolet	2004, 2006, 2007, 2008
1	(United States) Dodge	2005
