= NASCAR Truck Series at Indianapolis Raceway Park =

NASCAR Truck Series race at Lucas Oil Indianapolis Raceway Park

TSport 200

NASCAR Truck Series
- Venue: Lucas Oil Indianapolis Raceway Park
- Corporate sponsor: TSport
- First race: 1995
- Distance: 137.2 miles (220.801 km)
- Laps: 200
- Previous names: Action Packed Racing Cards 150 (1995); Cummins 200 (1996–1998); Power Stroke 200 by Ford (1999); Power Stroke Diesel 200 (2000–2008); AAA Insurance 200 presented by JD Byrider (2009–2011)

The TSport 200 is a NASCAR Truck Series race at Lucas Oil Indianapolis Raceway Park in the suburb of Clermont, Indiana, located west of Indianapolis. Layne Riggs is the defending race winner, having won the 2026 event.

The event has been held on the same weekend as the NASCAR Cup Series Brickyard 400 weekend at the nearby Indianapolis Motor Speedway.

== History ==
=== 1995–2011 ===
It was held each year starting in 1995 (the first season of the Truck Series) until 2011. From 1995 to 2000, the race was held on Thursday night. Notable moments including Kyle Busch making his first Truck series start in the 2001 edition of the race at the age of 16. In 2011 Ross Chastain had his first Truck Series start at that year's version of the race. On December 10, 2021, TSport, a company co-owned by Southern Off-Road Specialists as well as Truck Series team ThorSport Racing, was announced as the race's title sponsor in its return in 2022. From 2001 to 2011, and again in 2022–present, the race was held on Friday night.

== Past winners ==
Year	Date	Driver	Team	Manufacturer	Race Distance		Race Time	Average Speed (mph)	Report	Ref
Year	Date	Driver	Team	Manufacturer	Laps	Miles (km)	Race Time	Average Speed (mph)	Report	Ref
1995	August 3	Mike Skinner	Richard Childress Racing	Chevrolet	150	102.9 (165.601)	1:18:23	78.767	Report	
1996	August 1	Mike Skinner	Richard Childress Racing	Chevrolet	200	137.2 (220.801)	1:36:02	85.720	Report	
1997	July 31	Ron Hornaday Jr.	Dale Earnhardt, Inc.	Chevrolet	202*	138.572 (223.01)	1:41:40	81.753	Report	
1998	July 30	Jack Sprague	Hendrick Motorsports	Chevrolet	200	137.2 (220.801)	1:46:41	77.235	Report	
1999	August 5	Greg Biffle	Roush Racing	Ford	201*	137.886 (221.906)	1:33:16	88.704	Report	
2000	August 3	Joe Ruttman	Bobby Hamilton Racing	Dodge	200	137.2 (220.801)	1:49:38	75.084	Report	
2001	August 3	Jack Sprague	Hendrick Motorsports	Chevrolet	200	137.2 (220.801)	1:41:57	80.745	Report	
2002	August 2	Terry Cook	K Automotive Racing	Ford	200	137.2 (220.801)	1:51:13	74.018	Report	
2003	August 1	Carl Edwards	Roush Racing	Ford	200	137.2 (220.801)	1:33:25	88.121	Report	
2004	August 6	Chad Chaffin	Bobby Hamilton Racing	Dodge	200	137.2 (220.801)	1:46:54	77.007	Report	
2005	August 5	Dennis Setzer	Morgan-Dollar Motorsports	Chevrolet	200	137.2 (220.801)	1:36:57	84.910	Report	
2006	August 4	Rick Crawford	Circle Bar Racing	Ford	200	137.2 (220.801)	1:48:37	75.789	Report	
2007	July 27	Ron Hornaday Jr.	Kevin Harvick Inc.	Chevrolet	201*	137.886 (221.906)	1:48:14	76.438	Report	
2008	July 25	Johnny Benson Jr.	Bill Davis Racing	Toyota	200	137.2 (220.801)	1:49:58	74.859	Report	
2009	July 24	Ron Hornaday Jr.	Kevin Harvick Inc.	Chevrolet	200	137.2 (220.801)	1:36:43	85.115	Report	
2010	July 23	Ron Hornaday Jr.	Kevin Harvick Inc.	Chevrolet	200	137.2 (220.801)	1:37:18	84.604	Report	
2011	July 29	Timothy Peters	Red Horse Racing	Toyota	200	137.2 (220.801)	1:38:49	83.306	Report	
2012 – 2021	Not held									
2022	July 29	Grant Enfinger	GMS Racing	Chevrolet	207*	142.002 (228.529)	2:01:47	69.961	Report	
2023	August 11	Ty Majeski	ThorSport Racing	Ford	200	137.2 (220.801)	1:49:39	75.075	Report	
2024	July 19	Ty Majeski	ThorSport Racing	Ford	200	137.2 (220.801)	1:40:06	82.238	Report	
2025	July 25	Layne Riggs	Front Row Motorsports	Ford	200	137.2 (220.801)	1:40:14	82.128	Report	
2026	July 24	Layne Riggs	Front Row Motorsports	Ford	200	137.2 (220.801)	1:42:08	80.601	Report	
2027	July 23								Report	

- 1997, 1999, 2007, & 2022: Race extended due to NASCAR Overtime.

=== Multiple winners (drivers) ===
# Wins	Driver	Years won
4	Ron Hornaday Jr.	1997, 2007, 2009, 2010
2	Mike Skinner	1995, 1996
2	Jack Sprague	1998, 2001
2	Ty Majeski	2023, 2024
2	Layne Riggs	2025, 2026

=== Multiple winners (teams) ===
# Wins	Team	Years won
3	Kevin Harvick Inc.	2007, 2009, 2010
2	Richard Childress Racing	1995, 1996
2	Hendrick Motorsports	1998, 2001
2	Roush Racing	1999, 2003
2	Bobby Hamilton Racing	2000, 2004
2	ThorSport Racing	2023, 2024
2	Front Row Motorsports	2025, 2026

=== Manufacturer wins ===
# Wins	Make	Years won
10	(United States) Chevrolet	1995–1998, 2001, 2005, 2007, 2009, 2010, 2022
8	(United States) Ford	1999, 2002, 2003, 2006, 2023–2026
2	(United States) Dodge	2000, 2004
2	(Japan) Toyota	2008, 2011

Previous race: TBA	NASCAR Truck Series; TSport 200	Next race: UNOH 250
