= 2007 Ohio 250 =

Seventh race of the 2007 NASCAR Craftman Truck Series

2007 NASCAR Craftsman Truck Series Ohio 250
Race details
- Race 7 of 25 of the 2007 NASCAR Craftsman Truck Series
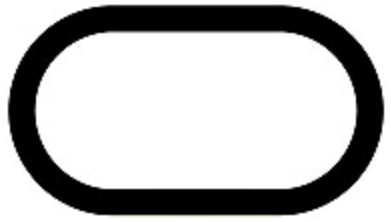
- Date: May 26, 2007
- Official name: Fourth Annual NASCAR Craftsman Truck Series Ohio 250
- Location: Mansfield, Ohio, Mansfield Motorsports Speedway
- Course: Permanent racing facility
- Course length: 0.71 km (0.44 miles)
- Distance: 250 laps, 110 mi (177.027 km)
- Scheduled distance: 250 laps, 110 mi (177.027 km)
- Average speed: 52.873 miles per hour (85.091 km/h)
- Attendance: 15,000

Pole position
Driver	Mike Skinner	Bill Davis Racing
- Time: 16.382

Most laps led
Driver	Rick Crawford	Circle Bar Racing
- Laps: 117

Winner
No. 75	Dennis Setzer	Spears Motorsports

Television in the United States
- Network: FOX
- Announcers: Rick Allen, Phil Parsons, Michael Waltrip

Radio in the United States
- Radio: Motor Racing Network

The 2007 NASCAR Craftsman Truck Series Ohio 250 was the seventh stock car race of the 2007 NASCAR Craftsman Truck Series and the fourth iteration of the event. The race was held on Saturday, May 26, 2007, before a crowd of 15,000 in Mansfield, Ohio, at Mansfield Motorsports Speedway, a 0.44 miles (0.71 km) permanent oval-shaped racetrack. The race took the scheduled 250 laps to complete. At race's end, Dennis Setzer, driving for Spears Motorsports, would perform fuel mileage mastery, performing no pitstops throughout the race to win his 17th career NASCAR Craftsman Truck Series win and his only win of the season. To fill out the podium, Jack Sprague, driving for Wyler Racing, and Ken Schrader, driving for Bobby Hamilton Racing, would finish second and third, respectively.

== Background ==
Mansfield Motor Speedway (formerly Mansfield Motorsports Park and Mansfield Motorsports Speedway) was a 0.44 mile dirt track located in Mansfield, Ohio, United States. The track hosted an ARCA RE/MAX Series race in 2009, and it also hosted the NASCAR Camping World Truck Series from 2004 to 2008.

=== Entry list ===
- (R) denotes rookie driver.

#	Driver	Team	Make	Sponsor
00	Ken Butler III	Darrell Waltrip Motorsports	Toyota	Aaron's
1	Aaron Fike (R)	Red Horse Racing	Toyota	Red Horse Racing
2	Daniel Pope	Kevin Harvick Incorporated	Chevrolet	Dollar General
4	Kevin Hamlin (R)	Bobby Hamilton Racing	Dodge	Dodge
5	Mike Skinner	Bill Davis Racing	Toyota	Toyota Tundra
6	Travis Kvapil	Roush Fenway Racing	Ford	K&N
7	Jason White (R)	Pennington Motorsports	Chevrolet	Hooters Energy Drink
07	Tim Sauter (R)	Green Light Racing	Chevrolet	Lester Buildings
8	Blake Bjorklund (R)	MRD Motorsports	Chevrolet	MRD Motorsports
08	Chad McCumbee	Green Light Racing	Chevrolet	The GPS Store, Garmin
9	Ted Musgrave	Germain Racing	Toyota	Automotive Service Excellence
09	Joey Clanton (R)	Wood Brothers/JTG Racing	Ford	Zaxby's
10	David Starr	Circle Bar Racing	Ford	International Maxx Force Diesel
13	Willie Allen (R)	ThorSport Racing	Chevrolet	Pork. The Other White Meat
14	Rick Crawford	Circle Bar Racing	Ford	Ford Power Stroke Diesel
15	Bill Lester	Billy Ballew Motorsports	Chevrolet	Christian Debt Consolidation
16	Chris Fontaine	Xpress Motorsports	Ford	Xpress Motorsports
18	Ken Schrader	Bobby Hamilton Racing	Dodge	Fastenal
21	Kelly Bires (R)	Wood Brothers/JTG Racing	Ford	U.S. Air Force
23	Johnny Benson Jr.	Bill Davis Racing	Toyota	Toyota Certified Used Vehicles, 360 OTC
30	Todd Bodine	Germain Racing	Toyota	Lumber Liquidators
33	Ron Hornaday Jr.	Kevin Harvick Incorporated	Chevrolet	Camping World
36	Ryan Mathews	Bill Davis Racing	Toyota	Bill Davis Racing
40	Clay Rogers	Key Motorsports	Chevrolet	Curtis Key Plumbing
42	Tim Cowen	Cowen Racing	Ford	Cowen Logistics
44	Frank Kreyer	Key Motorsports	Chevrolet	Culver's
47	Kraig Kinser	Morgan-Dollar Motorsports	Chevrolet	Ginn Resorts
49	Bradley Riethmeyer	Trotter Racing	Dodge	All American Driver Challenge
50	T. J. Bell	Roush Fenway Racing	Ford	Heathcliff's Cat Litter
51	Kelly Sutton	Billy Ballew Motorsports	Chevrolet	Copaxone
59	Terry Cook	HT Motorsports	Toyota	Harris Trucking
60	Jack Sprague	Wyler Racing	Toyota	Con-way
63	Jack Smith	MB Motorsports	Ford	Dave Porter Truck Sales
75	Dennis Setzer	Spears Motorsports	Chevrolet	Spears Manufacturing
77	Brendan Gaughan	South Point Racing	Chevrolet	South Point Hotel, Casino & Spa
88	Matt Crafton	ThorSport Racing	Chevrolet	Menards, Johns Manville
99	Erik Darnell	Roush Fenway Racing	Ford	Northern Tool & Equipment
Official entry list

== Practice ==
=== First practice ===
The first practice session was held on Friday, May 25, at 11:30 AM EST. The session would last for one hour. Ken Schrader, driving for Bobby Hamilton Racing, would set the fastest time in the session, with a lap of 16.866 and an average speed of 106.724 miles per hour (171.756 km/h).

Pos.	#	Driver	Team	Make	Time	Speed
1	18	Ken Schrader	Bobby Hamilton Racing	Dodge	16.866	106.724
2	33	Ron Hornaday Jr.	Kevin Harvick Incorporated	Chevrolet	16.870	106.698
3	59	Terry Cook	HT Motorsports	Toyota	16.875	106.667
Full first practice results

=== Second and final practice ===
The final practice session, sometimes referred to as Happy Hour, was held on Friday, May 25, at 1:30 PM EST. The session would last for one hour. Mike Skinner of Bill Davis Racing would set the fastest time in the session, with a lap of 16.453 and an average speed of 109.403 miles per hour (176.067 km/h).

Pos.	#	Driver	Team	Make	Time	Speed
1	5	Mike Skinner	Bill Davis Racing	Toyota	16.453	109.403
2	60	Jack Sprague	Wyler Racing	Toyota	16.535	108.860
3	33	Ron Hornaday Jr.	Kevin Harvick Incorporated	Chevrolet	16.585	108.532
Full Happy Hour practice results

== Qualifying ==
Qualifying was held on Friday, May 25, at 6:30 PM EST. Each driver would have two laps to set a fastest time; the fastest of the two would count as their official qualifying lap.

Mike Skinner, driving for Bill Davis Racing, would win the pole, setting a time of 16.382 and an average speed of 109.877 miles per hour (176.830 km/h).

Kelly Sutton was the only driver to fail to qualify.

=== Full qualifying results ===
Pos.	#	Driver	Team	Make	Time	Speed
1	5	Mike Skinner	Bill Davis Racing	Toyota	16.382	109.877
2	14	Rick Crawford	Circle Bar Racing	Ford	16.463	109.336
3	30	Todd Bodine	Germain Racing	Toyota	16.538	108.840
4	23	Johnny Benson Jr.	Bill Davis Racing	Toyota	16.565	108.663
5	6	Travis Kvapil	Roush Fenway Racing	Ford	16.582	108.551
6	59	Terry Cook	HT Motorsports	Toyota	16.598	108.447
7	99	Erik Darnell	Roush Fenway Racing	Ford	16.610	108.368
8	1	Aaron Fike (R)	Red Horse Racing	Toyota	16.619	108.310
9	33	Ron Hornaday Jr.	Kevin Harvick Incorporated	Chevrolet	16.622	108.290
10	88	Matt Crafton	ThorSport Racing	Chevrolet	16.639	108.180
11	60	Jack Sprague	Wyler Racing	Toyota	16.639	108.180
12	21	Kelly Bires (R)	Wood Brothers/JTG Racing	Ford	16.656	108.069
13	15	Bill Lester	Billy Ballew Motorsports	Chevrolet	16.661	108.037
14	18	Ken Schrader	Bobby Hamilton Racing	Dodge	16.664	108.017
15	40	Clay Rogers	Key Motorsports	Chevrolet	16.786	107.232
16	09	Joey Clanton (R)	Wood Brothers/JTG Racing	Ford	16.787	107.226
17	16	Chris Fontaine	Xpress Motorsports	Ford	16.826	106.977
18	75	Dennis Setzer	Spears Motorsports	Chevrolet	16.846	106.850
19	50	T. J. Bell	Roush Fenway Racing	Ford	16.918	106.396
20	13	Willie Allen (R)	ThorSport Racing	Chevrolet	16.935	106.289
21	9	Ted Musgrave	Germain Racing	Toyota	16.960	106.132
22	44	Frank Kreyer	Key Motorsports	Chevrolet	16.965	106.101
23	10	David Starr	Circle Bar Racing	Ford	16.978	106.020
24	36	Ryan Mathews	Bill Davis Racing	Toyota	16.986	105.970
25	00	Ken Butler III	Darrell Waltrip Motorsports	Toyota	16.993	105.926
26	47	Kraig Kinser	Morgan-Dollar Motorsports	Chevrolet	16.999	105.889
27	4	Kevin Hamlin (R)	Bobby Hamilton Racing	Dodge	17.000	105.882
28	08	Chad McCumbee	Green Light Racing	Chevrolet	17.020	105.758
29	49	Bradley Riethmeyer	Trotter Racing	Dodge	17.090	105.325
30	7	Jason White (R)	Pennington Motorsports	Chevrolet	17.103	105.245
31	8	Blake Bjorklund (R)	MRD Motorsports	Chevrolet	17.196	104.676
32	07	Tim Sauter (R)	Green Light Racing	Chevrolet	17.203	104.633
33	42	Tim Cowen	Cowen Racing	Ford	17.259	104.293
34	2	Daniel Pope	Kevin Harvick Incorporated	Chevrolet	17.260	104.287
35	77	Brendan Gaughan	South Point Racing	Chevrolet	17.359	103.693
Last car to qualify on time
36	63	Jack Smith	MB Motorsports	Ford	17.282	104.155
Failed to qualify
37	51	Kelly Sutton	Billy Ballew Motorsports	Chevrolet	17.394	103.484
Official qualifying results

== Race results ==
Fin	St	#	Driver	Team	Make	Laps	Led	Status	Pts	Winnings
1	18	75	Dennis Setzer	Spears Motorsports	Chevrolet	250	12	running	190	$52,150
2	11	60	Jack Sprague	Wyler Racing	Toyota	250	0	running	170	$32,125
3	14	18	Ken Schrader	Bobby Hamilton Racing	Dodge	250	0	running	165	$21,515
4	1	5	Mike Skinner	Bill Davis Racing	Toyota	250	53	running	165	$15,975
5	4	23	Johnny Benson Jr.	Bill Davis Racing	Toyota	250	0	running	155	$12,475
6	9	33	Ron Hornaday Jr.	Kevin Harvick Incorporated	Chevrolet	250	0	running	150	$11,025
7	5	6	Travis Kvapil	Roush Fenway Racing	Ford	250	0	running	146	$11,175
8	21	9	Ted Musgrave	Germain Racing	Toyota	250	0	running	142	$10,825
9	35	77	Brendan Gaughan	South Point Racing	Chevrolet	250	0	running	138	$10,775
10	27	4	Kevin Hamlin (R)	Bobby Hamilton Racing	Dodge	250	0	running	134	$12,600
11	16	09	Joey Clanton (R)	Wood Brothers/JTG Racing	Ford	250	0	running	130	$11,000
12	6	59	Terry Cook	HT Motorsports	Toyota	250	0	running	127	$10,525
13	19	50	T. J. Bell	Roush Fenway Racing	Ford	250	0	running	124	$10,475
14	28	08	Chad McCumbee	Green Light Racing	Chevrolet	250	0	running	121	$10,425
15	7	99	Erik Darnell	Roush Fenway Racing	Ford	250	0	running	118	$10,875
16	15	40	Clay Rogers	Key Motorsports	Chevrolet	250	0	running	115	$10,275
17	17	16	Chris Fontaine	Xpress Motorsports	Ford	250	0	running	112	$10,575
18	24	36	Ryan Mathews	Bill Davis Racing	Toyota	250	0	running	109	$10,175
19	23	10	David Starr	Circle Bar Racing	Ford	250	0	running	106	$8,875
20	32	07	Tim Sauter (R)	Green Light Racing	Chevrolet	250	0	running	103	$8,975
21	13	15	Bill Lester	Billy Ballew Motorsports	Chevrolet	250	0	running	100	$8,100
22	29	49	Bradley Riethmeyer	Trotter Racing	Dodge	250	0	running	97	$7,750
23	2	14	Rick Crawford	Circle Bar Racing	Ford	250	117	running	104	$9,525
24	8	1	Aaron Fike (R)	Red Horse Racing	Toyota	248	0	running	91	$7,700
25	12	21	Kelly Bires (R)	Wood Brothers/JTG Racing	Ford	248	0	running	88	$7,625
26	30	7	Jason White (R)	Pennington Motorsports	Chevrolet	248	0	running	85	$7,600
27	36	63	Jack Smith	MB Motorsports	Ford	246	0	running	82	$7,575
28	20	13	Willie Allen (R)	ThorSport Racing	Chevrolet	245	0	running	79	$7,550
29	34	2	Daniel Pope	Kevin Harvick Incorporated	Chevrolet	245	0	running	76	$7,500
30	33	42	Tim Cowen	Cowen Racing	Ford	244	0	running	73	$7,475
31	3	30	Todd Bodine	Germain Racing	Toyota	238	0	running	70	$8,125
32	31	8	Blake Bjorklund (R)	MRD Motorsports	Chevrolet	219	0	running	67	$7,100
33	26	47	Kraig Kinser	Morgan-Dollar Motorsports	Chevrolet	206	0	running	64	$7,075
34	22	44	Frank Kreyer	Key Motorsports	Chevrolet	205	0	engine	61	$7,050
35	10	88	Matt Crafton	ThorSport Racing	Chevrolet	172	68	running	63	$7,025
36	25	00	Ken Butler III	Darrell Waltrip Motorsports	Toyota	167	0	engine	55	$6,996
Failed to qualify
37		51	Kelly Sutton	Billy Ballew Motorsports	Chevrolet					
Official race results

Previous race: 2007 Quaker Steak & Lube 200	NASCAR Craftsman Truck Series; 2007 season	Next race: 2007 AAA Insurance 200
