= Puccia =

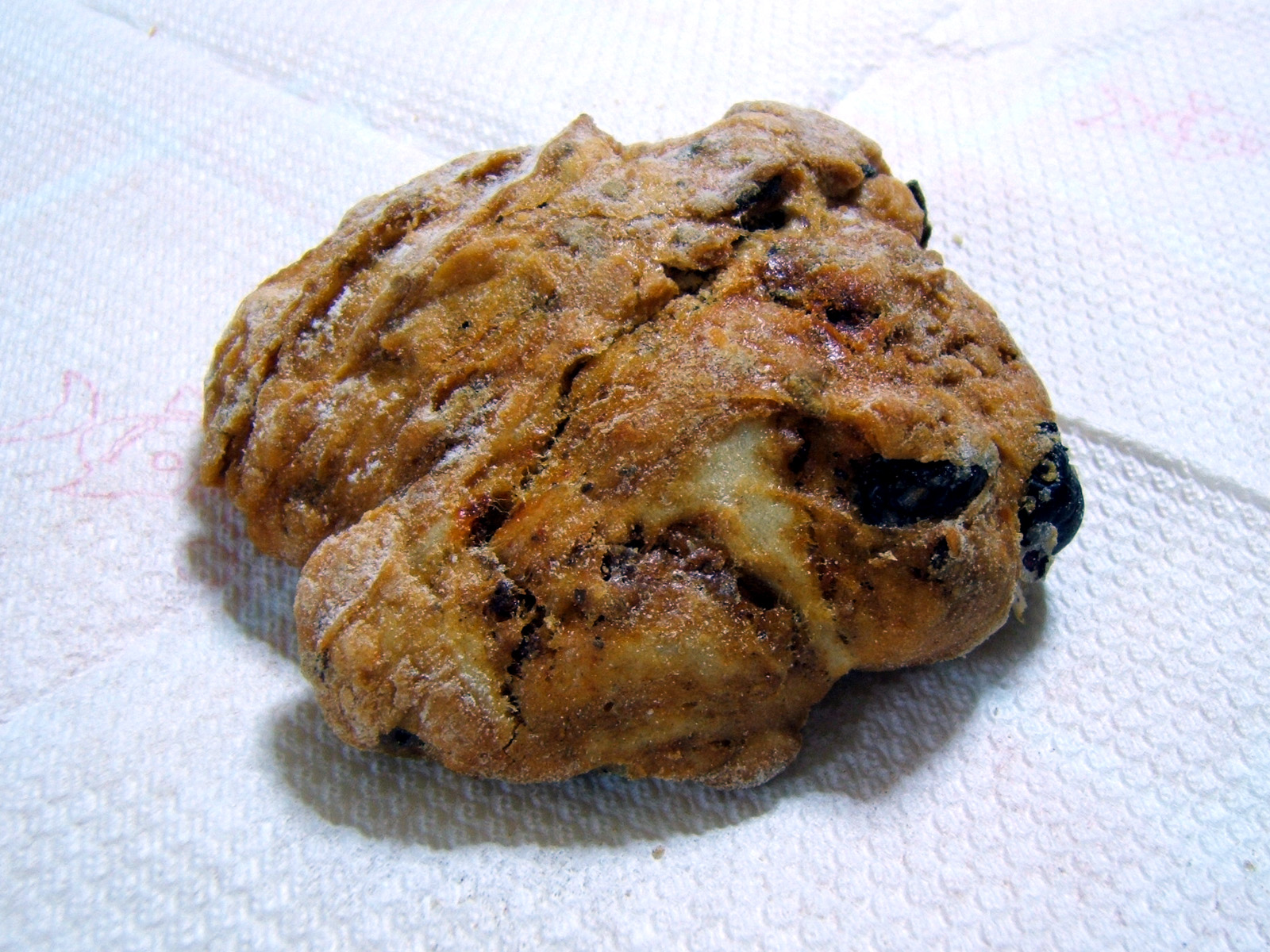
A puccia

Puccia is an Italian surname. Notable people with the surname include:

- Matt Puccia, American stock car racing crew chief.
