= 2007 NASCAR Craftsman Truck Series =

American motorsport season

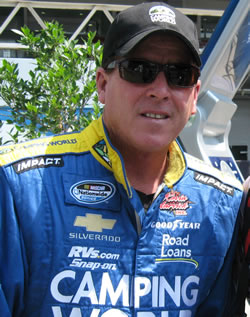
Ron Hornaday Jr., the 2007 Craftsman Truck Series champion.

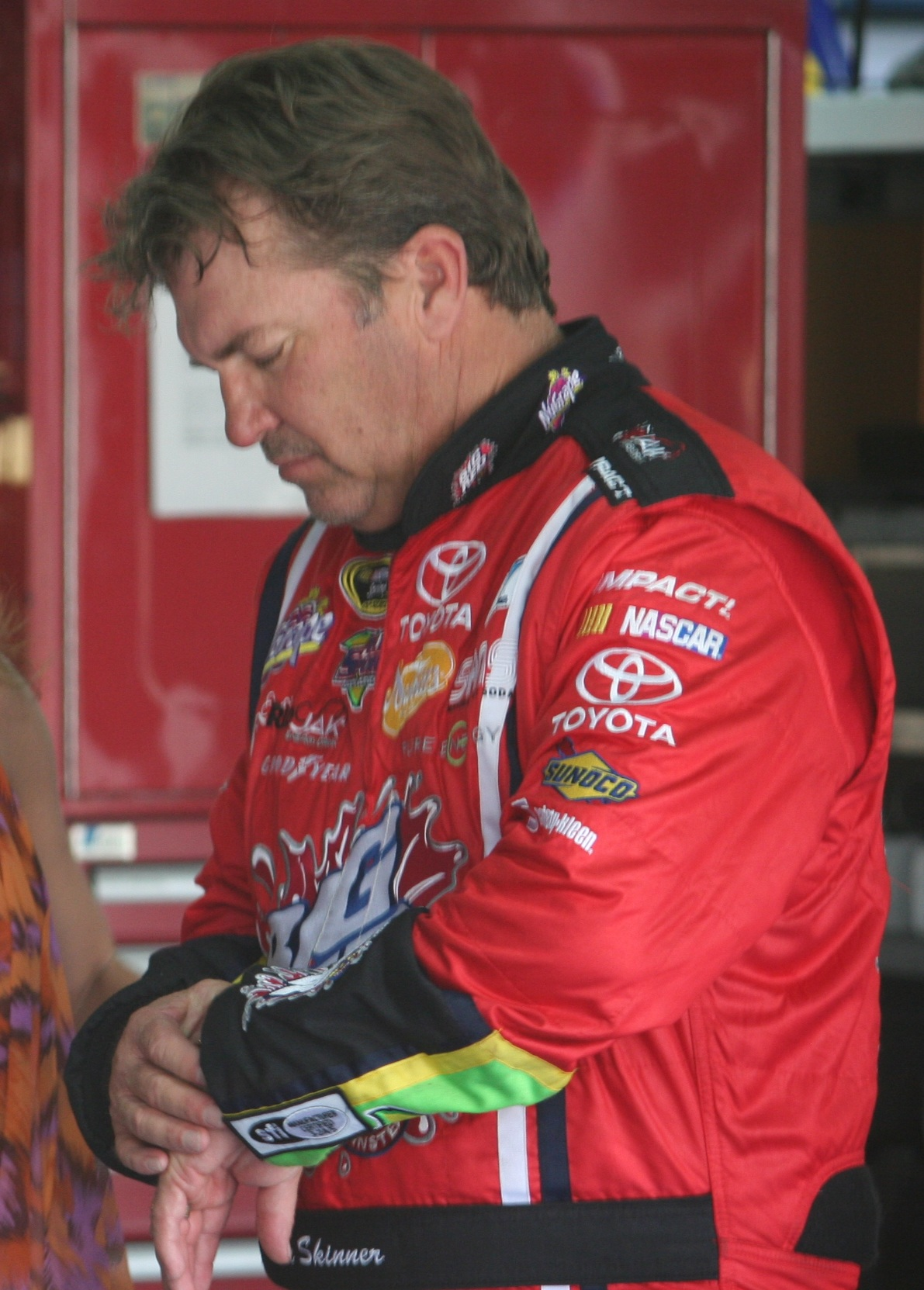
Mike Skinner finished second behind Hornaday.

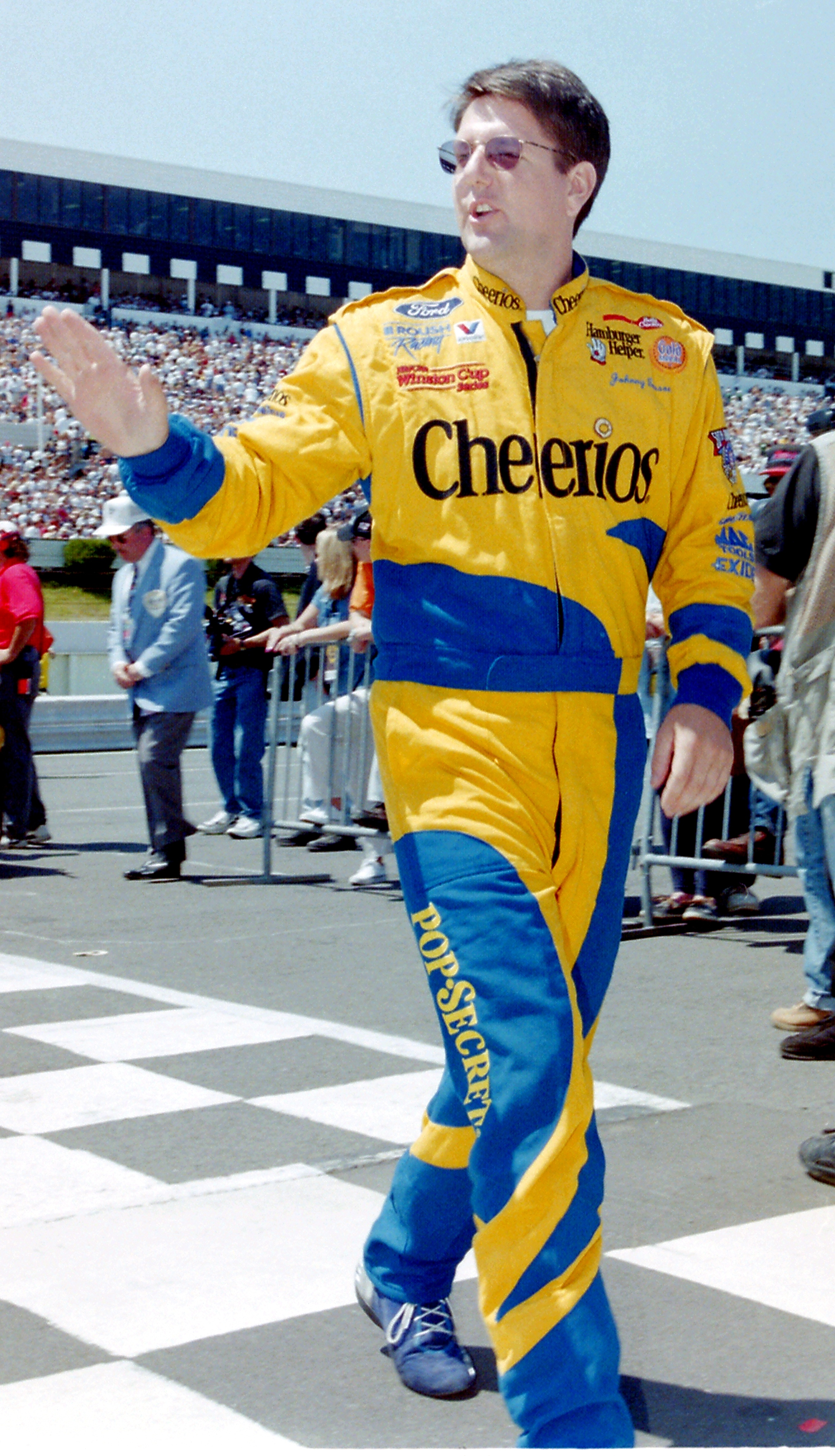
Johnny Benson finished third in the championship.

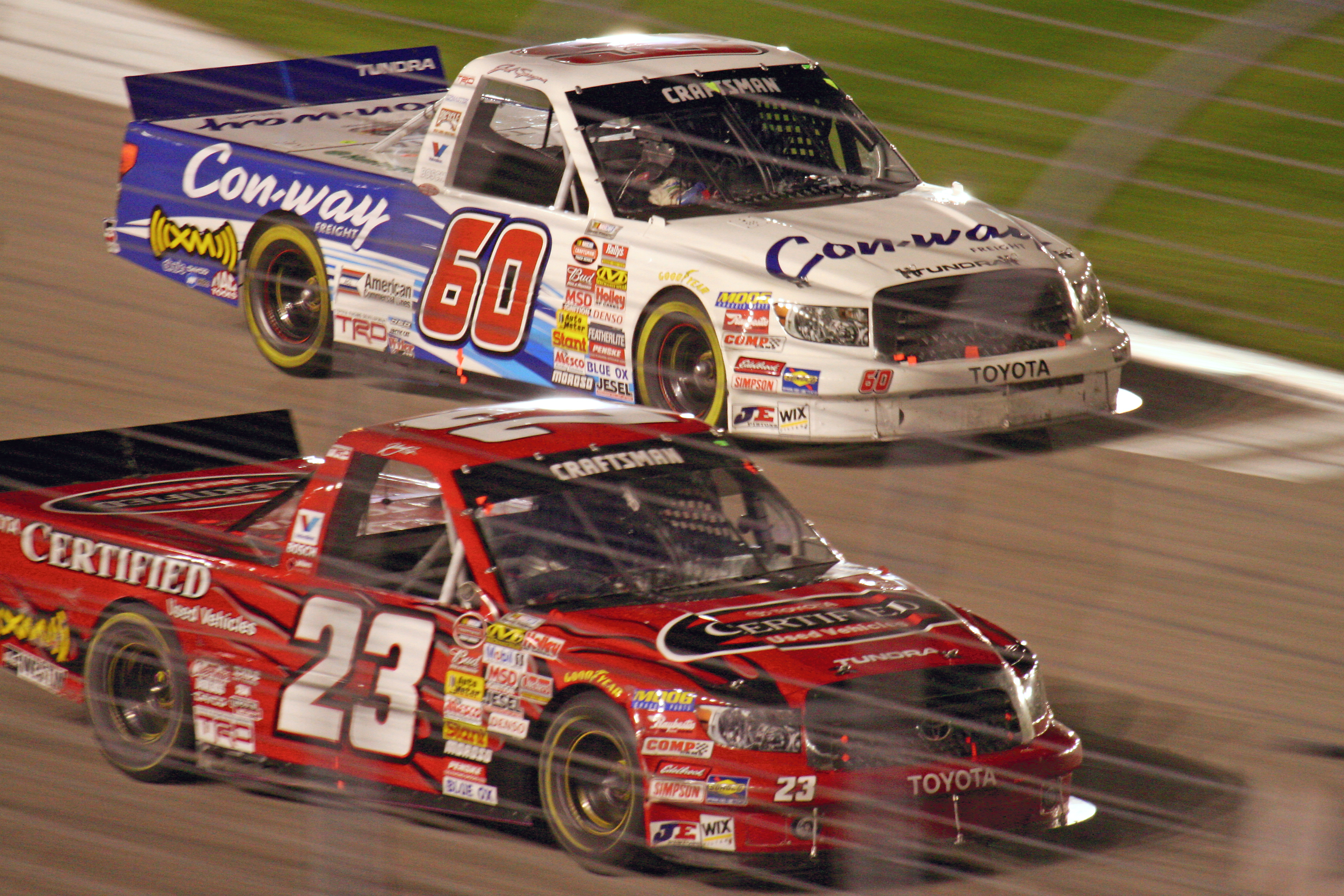
Toyota won their second consecutive manufacturers' championship with 13 wins.

The 2007 NASCAR Craftsman Truck Series season was the 13th season of the NASCAR Craftsman Truck Series, a pickup truck racing series sanctioned by NASCAR in the United States. the season began on February 16, 2007, at Daytona International Speedway with the Chevy Silverado HD 250, and ended on November 16, 2007, with the Ford 200 at Homestead–Miami Speedway. Ron Hornaday Jr. of Kevin Harvick, Inc. was crowned champion, tying Jack Sprague for most Truck Series championships at three.

== Top storylines ==
- One month before the season started, team owner and driver Bobby Hamilton succumbed to cancer.
- Two series drivers, Tyler Walker and Aaron Fike, were suspended by NASCAR indefinitely for violations of the organization's substance abuse program. Fike's suspension came after he and his girlfriend were arrested on possession charges at the parking lot of the Kings Island theme park near Cincinnati, Ohio.
- Ted Musgrave, the 2005 champion, was suspended for one race due to an altercation with Kelly Bires during a caution period at the Toyota Tundra Milwaukee 200 at the Milwaukee Mile. In the race Musgrave sat out, Brad Keselowski almost drove the No. 9 truck to victory until a late-race crash with Travis Kvapil took him out. Keselowski's performance is credited with his discovery by JR Motorsports and eventually signing with that Busch Series team.
- Mike Skinner won three straight races (California, Atlanta and the first at Martinsville) and led in poles as well. Skinner led the standings all season until the race at Gateway International Raceway, when he was overtaken by Ron Hornaday Jr.
- Tripp Bruce, crew chief for the No. 23 team and driver Johnny Benson, was suspended for two races for allowing a driver not licensed by NASCAR to test the truck at Lowe's Motor Speedway. The team and Benson Jr. also lost 25 points in the respective standings and Bruce was fined.
- Speed Channel began a new eight-year contract to continue NCTS telecasts, but two races were moved to Fox. The second of those, the Ohio 250 at Mansfield Motorsports Park, aired on that network for only 19 laps before rain came and the rest of the event aired on Speed Channel while MLB on Fox aired on the main network. However, most of the race was moved to tape delay due to more rain and a conflict with the Busch Series race at Lowe's Motor Speedway running simultaneously (NASCAR prohibits more than one national series from being televised at the same time). The other Fox telecast was the Kroger 250 at Martinsville Speedway.

== Schedule ==
The season schedule consisted of 25 races held at tracks across the United States.

No.	Race title	Track	Location	Date	TV
1	Chevy Silverado HD 250	Daytona International Speedway	Daytona Beach, Florida	February 16	Speed
2	San Bernardino County 200	California Speedway	Fontana, California	February 23	Speed
3	American Commercial Lines 200	Atlanta Motor Speedway	Hampton, Georgia	March 16	Speed
4	Kroger 250	Martinsville Speedway	Ridgeway, Virginia	March 31	Fox
5	O'Reilly Auto Parts 250	Kansas Speedway	Kansas City, Kansas	April 28	Speed
6	Quaker Steak & Lube 200	Lowe's Motor Speedway	Concord, North Carolina	May 18	Speed
7	City of Mansfield 250	Mansfield Motorsports Park	Mansfield, Ohio	May 26	Fox
8	AAA Insurance 200	Dover International Speedway	Dover, Delaware	June 1	Speed
9	Sam's Town 400	Texas Motor Speedway	Fort Worth, Texas	June 8	Speed
10	Michigan 200	Michigan International Speedway	Cambridge Township, Michigan	June 16	Speed
11	Toyota Tundra Milwaukee 200	Milwaukee Mile	West Allis, Wisconsin	June 22	Speed
12	O'Reilly 200	Memphis Motorsports Park	Millington, Tennessee	June 30	Speed
13	Built Ford Tough 225	Kentucky Speedway	Sparta, Kentucky	July 14	Speed
14	Power Stroke Diesel 200	O'Reilly Raceway Park	Brownsburg, Indiana	July 27	Speed
15	Toyota Tundra 200	Nashville Superspeedway	Lebanon, Tennessee	August 11	Speed
16	O'Reilly Auto Parts 200	Bristol Motor Speedway	Bristol, Tennessee	August 22	Speed
17	Missouri/Illinois Dodge Dealers Ram Tough 200	Gateway International Raceway	Madison, Illinois	September 1	Speed
18	New Hampshire 200	New Hampshire International Speedway	Loudon, New Hampshire	September 15	Speed
19	Smith's Las Vegas 350	Las Vegas Motor Speedway	Las Vegas, Nevada	September 22	Speed
20	Mountain Dew 250	Talladega Superspeedway	Lincoln, Alabama	October 6	Speed
21	Kroger 200	Martinsville Speedway	Ridgeway, Virginia	October 20	Speed
22	EasyCare Vehicle Service Contracts 200	Atlanta Motor Speedway	Hampton, Georgia	October 27	Speed
23	Silverado 350K	Texas Motor Speedway	Fort Worth, Texas	November 2	Speed
24	Phoenix 150	Phoenix International Raceway	Avondale, Arizona	November 9	Speed
25	Ford 200	Homestead–Miami Speedway	Homestead, Florida	November 16	Speed

=== Television coverage ===
Fox-owned Speed again covered the entire 2007 Truck Series season, except for two races on Fox.

== Teams and drivers ==
=== Complete schedule ===
Manufacturer	Team	No.	Driver(s)	Crew chief
Chevrolet	Billy Ballew Motorsports	15	Bill Lester 15	Richie Wauters 22; Doug George 3
Chevrolet	Billy Ballew Motorsports	15	Nate Monteith 1	Richie Wauters 22; Doug George 3
Chevrolet	Billy Ballew Motorsports	15	J. R. Norris 2	Richie Wauters 22; Doug George 3
Chevrolet	Billy Ballew Motorsports	15	Shane Sieg 3	Richie Wauters 22; Doug George 3
Chevrolet	Billy Ballew Motorsports	15	Buddy Lazier 1	Richie Wauters 22; Doug George 3
Chevrolet	Billy Ballew Motorsports	15	Denny Hamlin 1	Richie Wauters 22; Doug George 3
Chevrolet	Billy Ballew Motorsports	15	Andrew Myers 2	Richie Wauters 22; Doug George 3
Chevrolet	Green Light Racing	07	Tim Sauter (R)	Jim Sauter 4 Doug Howe 21
Chevrolet	Green Light Racing	08	Chad McCumbee 14	Dan Glauz 18; Bobby Dotter 7
Chevrolet	Green Light Racing	08	Eric Norris 1	Dan Glauz 18; Bobby Dotter 7
Chevrolet	Green Light Racing	08	Shane Sieg 1	Dan Glauz 18; Bobby Dotter 7
Chevrolet	Green Light Racing	08	Boris Jurkovic 1	Dan Glauz 18; Bobby Dotter 7
Chevrolet	Green Light Racing	08	Dennis Setzer 1	Dan Glauz 18; Bobby Dotter 7
Chevrolet	Green Light Racing	08	Johnny Chapman 1	Dan Glauz 18; Bobby Dotter 7
Chevrolet	Green Light Racing	08	Marc Mitchell 1	Dan Glauz 18; Bobby Dotter 7
Chevrolet	Green Light Racing	08	Chris Jones 3	Dan Glauz 18; Bobby Dotter 7
Chevrolet	Green Light Racing	08	Travis Kittleson 2	Dan Glauz 18; Bobby Dotter 7
Chevrolet	Kevin Harvick, Inc.	33	Ron Hornaday Jr.	Rick Ren
Chevrolet	Key Motorsports	40	Mike Bliss 4	Barry Dodson 6 Tommy Morgan 2 Gary Showalter 17
Chevrolet	Key Motorsports	40	Clay Rogers 4	Barry Dodson 6 Tommy Morgan 2 Gary Showalter 17
Chevrolet	Key Motorsports	40	Shane Huffman 3	Barry Dodson 6 Tommy Morgan 2 Gary Showalter 17
Chevrolet	Key Motorsports	40	Stacy Compton 1	Barry Dodson 6 Tommy Morgan 2 Gary Showalter 17
Chevrolet	Key Motorsports	40	Brandon Miller 5	Barry Dodson 6 Tommy Morgan 2 Gary Showalter 17
Chevrolet	Key Motorsports	40	Chad Chaffin 8	Barry Dodson 6 Tommy Morgan 2 Gary Showalter 17
Chevrolet	Morgan-Dollar Motorsports	47	Kraig Kinser 13	Rodney McGehee 9 Chris Showalter 9 Eric Phillips 7
Chevrolet	Morgan-Dollar Motorsports	47	Regan Smith 10	Rodney McGehee 9 Chris Showalter 9 Eric Phillips 7
Chevrolet	Morgan-Dollar Motorsports	47	Aric Almirola 2	Rodney McGehee 9 Chris Showalter 9 Eric Phillips 7
Chevrolet	MRD Motorsports	8	Blake Bjorklund (R) 15	Dan Glauz 5 Steve Genenbacher 20
Chevrolet	MRD Motorsports	8	Chad McCumbee 8	Dan Glauz 5 Steve Genenbacher 20
Chevrolet	MRD Motorsports	8	Travis Dassow 2	Dan Glauz 5 Steve Genenbacher 20
Chevrolet	Spears Motorsports	75	Dennis Setzer 17	Dave McCarty 2 Tom Ackerman 23
Chevrolet	Spears Motorsports	75	Clay Rogers 8	Dave McCarty 2 Tom Ackerman 23
Chevrolet	ThorSport Racing	13	Willie Allen (R)	Lance Hooper 14; Danny Gill 11
Chevrolet	ThorSport Racing	88	Matt Crafton	Bud Haefele
Dodge	Bobby Hamilton Racing	4	Chase Miller 5	Marcus Richmond
Dodge	Bobby Hamilton Racing	4	Kevin Hamlin (R) 4	Marcus Richmond
Dodge	Bobby Hamilton Racing	4	Mike Bliss 13	Marcus Richmond
Dodge	Bobby Hamilton Racing	4	Joe Ruttman 1	Marcus Richmond
Dodge	Bobby Hamilton Racing	4	Bobby Labonte 1	Marcus Richmond
Dodge	Bobby Hamilton Racing	4	Ryan Mathews (R) 1	Marcus Richmond
Dodge	Bobby Hamilton Racing	18	Ken Schrader 17	Jeff White
Dodge	Bobby Hamilton Racing	18	Joe Ruttman 1	Jeff White
Dodge	Bobby Hamilton Racing	18	Dennis Setzer 7	Jeff White
Dodge	South Point Racing	77	Brendan Gaughan	Bryan Berry
Ford	Circle Bar Racing	10	David Starr	Dennis Conner
Ford	Circle Bar Racing	14	Rick Crawford	Kevin Starland
Ford	Roush Fenway Racing	6	Travis Kvapil	Mike Beam
Ford	Roush Fenway Racing	50	Carl Edwards 2	Matt Puccia 20; John Quinn 5
Ford	Roush Fenway Racing	50	T. J. Bell 16	Matt Puccia 20; John Quinn 5
Ford	Roush Fenway Racing	50	Peter Shepherd III (R) 4	Matt Puccia 20; John Quinn 5
Ford	Roush Fenway Racing	50	Danny O'Quinn Jr. 2	Matt Puccia 20; John Quinn 5
Ford	Roush Fenway Racing	50	Colin Braun 1	Matt Puccia 20; John Quinn 5
Ford	Roush Fenway Racing	99	Erik Darnell	John Quinn 20; Matt Puccia 5
Ford	Wood Brothers/JTG Racing	09	Joey Clanton (R) 16	Dennis Conner 16; Gary Cogswell 9
Ford	Wood Brothers/JTG Racing	09	Stacy Compton 9	Dennis Conner 16; Gary Cogswell 9
Ford	Wood Brothers/JTG Racing	21	Kelly Bires (R) 6	Jon Monsam
Ford	Wood Brothers/JTG Racing	21	Mark Martin 6	Jon Monsam
Ford	Wood Brothers/JTG Racing	21	Stacy Compton 1	Jon Monsam
Ford	Wood Brothers/JTG Racing	21	Keven Wood 1	Jon Monsam
Ford	Wood Brothers/JTG Racing	21	Jon Wood 11	Jon Monsam
Toyota	Bill Davis Racing	5	Mike Skinner	Jeff Hensley
Toyota	Bill Davis Racing	23	Johnny Benson	Trip Bruce 14; Billy Hagerthy 11
Toyota	Bill Davis Racing	27 1	Tyler Walker (R) 6	Doug Wolcott
Toyota	Bill Davis Racing	27 1	Ryan Mathews (R) 12	Doug Wolcott
Toyota	Bill Davis Racing	27 1	Jacques Villeneuve 7	Doug Wolcott
Toyota	Darrell Waltrip Motorsports	00	A. J. Allmendinger 9	Jason Overstreet 19; Randy Goss 6
Toyota	Darrell Waltrip Motorsports	00	Josh Wise 9	Jason Overstreet 19; Randy Goss 6
Toyota	Darrell Waltrip Motorsports	00	Ken Butler III 2	Jason Overstreet 19; Randy Goss 6
Toyota	Darrell Waltrip Motorsports	00	Justin Labonte 2	Jason Overstreet 19; Randy Goss 6
Toyota	TRG Motorsports	00	Andy Lally 3	Jason Overstreet 19; Randy Goss 6
Toyota	Germain Racing	9	Ted Musgrave 24	Rick Gay 21; Mike Hillman 1 Mike Abner 3
Toyota	Germain Racing	9	Brad Keselowski 1	Rick Gay 21; Mike Hillman 1 Mike Abner 3
Toyota	Germain Racing	30	Todd Bodine	Mike Hillman Jr.
Toyota	HT Motorsports	59	Terry Cook 24	Danny Rollins
Toyota	HT Motorsports	59	Donny Lia 1	Danny Rollins
Toyota	Red Horse Racing	1	Aaron Fike (R) 12	Jamie Jones
Toyota	Red Horse Racing	1	David Green 7	Jamie Jones
Toyota	Red Horse Racing	1	Jason Leffler 5	Jamie Jones
Toyota	Red Horse Racing	1	Brandon Whitt 1	Jamie Jones
Toyota	Wyler Racing	60	Jack Sprague	Tony Furr 21; Rick Gay 4
Chevrolet 12 Dodge 13	Pennington Motorsports	7	Derrike Cope 1	Gary Showalter 18; Barry Dodson 3 Steve Kuykendall 4
Chevrolet 12 Dodge 13	Pennington Motorsports	7	Casey Kingsland (R) 1	Gary Showalter 18; Barry Dodson 3 Steve Kuykendall 4
Chevrolet 12 Dodge 13	Pennington Motorsports	7	Brad Keselowski 2	Gary Showalter 18; Barry Dodson 3 Steve Kuykendall 4
Chevrolet 12 Dodge 13	Pennington Motorsports	7	Jason White (R) 21	Gary Showalter 18; Barry Dodson 3 Steve Kuykendall 4
Ford 23 Chevrolet 2	Xpress Motorsports	16	Stacy Compton 3	Dave Fuge
Ford 23 Chevrolet 2	Xpress Motorsports	16	Kelly Bires (R) 1	Dave Fuge
Ford 23 Chevrolet 2	Xpress Motorsports	16	Kenny Hendrick 4	Dave Fuge
Ford 23 Chevrolet 2	Xpress Motorsports	16	Mike Bliss 1	Dave Fuge
Ford 23 Chevrolet 2	Xpress Motorsports	16	Chris Fontaine 2	Dave Fuge
Ford 23 Chevrolet 2	Xpress Motorsports	16	Scott Lagasse Jr. 1	Dave Fuge
Ford 23 Chevrolet 2	Xpress Motorsports	16	Derrike Cope 4	Dave Fuge
Ford 23 Chevrolet 2	Xpress Motorsports	16	Boston Reid 1	Dave Fuge
Ford 23 Chevrolet 2	Xpress Motorsports	16	Benny Gordon 1	Dave Fuge
Ford 23 Chevrolet 2	Xpress Motorsports	16	Brian Scott 7	Dave Fuge

=== Limited Schedule ===
Manufacturer	Team	No.	Driver(s)	Crew Chief	Rounds
Chevrolet	Andy Belmont Racing	12	Patrick Sheltra	Andy Belmont	1
Chevrolet	Andy Belmont Racing	12	Wayne Edwards	Andy Belmont	1
Chevrolet	Billy Ballew Motorsports	51	Paul Menard	Richie Wauters	1
Chevrolet	Billy Ballew Motorsports	51	Kelly Sutton	Richie Wauters	4
Chevrolet	Billy Ballew Motorsports	51	Kyle Busch	Richie Wauters	11
Chevrolet	Billy Ballew Motorsports	51	Aric Almirola	Richie Wauters	1
Chevrolet	Billy Ballew Motorsports	51	Kenny Wallace	Richie Wauters	1
Chevrolet	Coffman Motorsports	58	John Coffman		1
Chevrolet	Green Light Racing	0	Brandon Knupp	Paul Rice	1
Chevrolet	Green Light Racing	0	Wayne Edwards	Paul Rice	1
Chevrolet	Green Light Racing	06	Morgan Shepherd	Bobby Dotter 5 Josh Cummings 3	1
Chevrolet	Green Light Racing	06	Blake Mallory	Bobby Dotter 5 Josh Cummings 3	1
Chevrolet	Green Light Racing	06	Randy MacDonald	Bobby Dotter 5 Josh Cummings 3	1
Chevrolet	Green Light Racing	06	Bobby Dotter (Note: Casey Kingsland made the field at Las Vegas (Race 19) but he was replaced in the race by Bobby Dotter.)	Bobby Dotter 5 Josh Cummings 3	2
Chevrolet	Green Light Racing	06	Wayne Edwards	Bobby Dotter 5 Josh Cummings 3	2
Chevrolet	Green Light Racing	06	Brandon Knupp	Bobby Dotter 5 Josh Cummings 3	1
Chevrolet	Green Light Racing	06	Casey Kingsland (R)	Bobby Dotter 5 Josh Cummings 3	1
Chevrolet	Green Light Racing	06	Davin Scites	Mike Davis	1
Chevrolet	Green Light Racing	78	Johnny Chapman	Bobby Dotter	1
Chevrolet	Jeff Milburn Racing	76	Chris Wimmer	Jeff Milburn	2
Chevrolet	Jeff Milburn Racing	76	Peyton Sellers	Jeff Milburn	1
Chevrolet	Jim Rosenblum Racing	28	Brandon Knupp	Dick Rahilly	2
Chevrolet	Jim Rosenblum Racing	28	Shane Sieg	Dick Rahilly	1
Chevrolet	Kevin Harvick, Inc.	2	Cale Gale	Charlie Wilson	5
Chevrolet	Kevin Harvick, Inc.	2	Kevin Harvick	Charlie Wilson	6
Chevrolet	Kevin Harvick, Inc.	2	Clint Bowyer	Charlie Wilson	4
Chevrolet	Kevin Harvick, Inc.	2	Daniel Pope	Charlie Wilson	1
Chevrolet	Key Motorsports	44	Larry Foyt	Tony Lambert	1
Chevrolet	Key Motorsports	44	Morgan Shepherd	Tony Lambert	2
Chevrolet	Key Motorsports	44	Frank Kreyer	Tony Lambert	2
Chevrolet	LCS Motorsports	87	Chris Jones	Greg Tester	1
Chevrolet	Morgan-Dollar Motorsports	46	Mike Wallace	Eric Phillips 4 Rodney McGehee 1 Kurt Binkley 1	1
Chevrolet	Morgan-Dollar Motorsports	46	Timothy Peters	Eric Phillips 4 Rodney McGehee 1 Kurt Binkley 1	2
Chevrolet	Morgan-Dollar Motorsports	46	Travis Kittleson	Eric Phillips 4 Rodney McGehee 1 Kurt Binkley 1	2
Chevrolet	Morgan-Dollar Motorsports	46	Scott Wimmer	Eric Phillips 4 Rodney McGehee 1 Kurt Binkley 1	1
Chevrolet	Prime Development Group Racing	64	Jimmy Simpson	Robert McVay	1
Chevrolet	Stellar-Quest Racing	91	J. C. Stout	Steve Mollnow	5
Chevrolet	Team Racing	86	Clay Rogers	Phil Bonifield 4 Steve Mollnow 4	1
Chevrolet	Team Racing	86	Dana White	Phil Bonifield 4 Steve Mollnow 4	4
Chevrolet	Team Racing	86	Kevin Lepage	Phil Bonifield 4 Steve Mollnow 4	3
Dodge	Blankenbaker Motorsports	53	Bradley Riethmeyer	Dan Patrick	2
Dodge	Blankenbaker Motorsports	53	Joe Ruttman	Dan Patrick	1
Dodge	Bobby Hamilton Racing	04	Joe Ruttman	Bob Bissinger	2
Dodge	Cunningham Motorsports	41	Dario Franchitti	Brian Pattie	1
Dodge	Reary Racing	54	Brian Sockwell (R)	Steven Barfield	2
Dodge	Thompson Motorsports	61	Brett Thompson	Lonnie Rush	3
Dodge	Trotter Racing	49	Bradley Riethmeyer	Gary Huffman	4
Dodge	Windward Racing	29	Scott Lynch	Larry Pryor	5
Dodge	Windward Racing	63	Scott Lynch	Mike Mittler	1
Ford	Collum Motorsports	32	Cory Collum		1
Ford	Cowen Racing	42	Tim Cowen		3
Ford	MB Motorsports	63	Jason White (R)	Mike Mittler 9 Tim Weiss 1	1
Ford	MB Motorsports	63	Scott Lynch	Mike Mittler 9 Tim Weiss 1	6
Ford	MB Motorsports	63	Jack Smith	Mike Mittler 9 Tim Weiss 1	3
Ford	MB Motorsports	68	Jack Smith	Mike Mittler	1
Ford	Upshaw Racing	95	Wayne Edwards	Robert Ulery	3
Ford	Xpress Motorsports	19	Travis Kittleson	Kenny Hendrick	1
Toyota	Bill Davis Racing	22	Dave Blaney	Doug Wolcott	1
Toyota	Bill Davis Racing	36	Donny Lia	Tommy Baldwin Jr.	1
Toyota	Darrell Waltrip Motorsports	17	Michael McDowell	Patrick Donahue	1
Toyota	Germain Racing	03	Justin Hobgood		1
Toyota	Germain Racing	03	Sean Caisse		1
Toyota	Germain Racing	03	Mike Wallace		1
Toyota	Germain Racing	03	Justin Marks	Jason Overstreet	4
Toyota	HT Motorsports	92	Terry Cook	Jason Miller	1
Dodge 3 Chevrolet 1	Brevak Racing	31	Brad Mueller	Tony Ave	1
Dodge 3 Chevrolet 1	Brevak Racing	31	Tim Schendel	Tony Mitchell	3
Chevrolet 10 Ford 1	Fast Track Racing	71	Bryan Silas	Rodney Jackisch 4 Tony Blanchard 7	7
Chevrolet 10 Ford 1	Fast Track Racing	71	Pierre Bourque	Rodney Jackisch 4 Tony Blanchard 7	1
Chevrolet 10 Ford 1	Fast Track Racing	71	Wayne Edwards	Rodney Jackisch 4 Tony Blanchard 7	2
Chevrolet 10 Ford 1	Fast Track Racing	71	Hermie Sadler	Rodney Jackisch 4 Tony Blanchard 7	1

=== Driver changes ===
- On May 29, Bill Davis Racing driver Tyler Walker was suspended indefinitely by NASCAR for failing to follow its substance abuse policy. Driver Ryan Mathews took his place.
- On June 27, Germain Racing driver Ted Musgrave was suspended for one race by NASCAR following an altercation with Kelly Bires at the Milwaukee Mile. Brad Keselowski replaced him at Memphis.
- On July 9, Red Horse Racing driver Aaron Fike, along with his fiancée were stopped in Warren County, Ohio, and were arrested for possession of heroin. Fike along with his fiancée were later suspended by NASCAR for the incident. Busch Series champion David Green and Jason Leffler split time in the RHR truck for the rest of the season.
- On August 14, Green Light Racing dropped driver Chad McCumbee from the No. 08 team. Shane Sieg drove the No. 08 at Bristol.
- On August 20, McCumbee replaced Blake Bjorklund at MRD Motorsports in the No. 8 Truck.

Also, beginning this season, the trucks will be identical from the windshield to the rear of the truck. However, the noses will continue to be branded as the Chevrolet Silverado, Dodge Ram, Ford F-150, and Toyota Tundra.

== Races ==
=== Chevrolet Silverado HD 250 ===
This race was held February 16 at Daytona International Speedway. Jack Sprague won the pole and would win the race from the pole. On the final lap, Travis Kvapil, only a few yards short of taking the second consecutive victory at Daytona for the 6 truck, was passed by the Toyota Tundras of Sprague on the high side and Johnny Benson, who had given Sprague a bump, near (but not on) the apron in a three-wide finish reminiscent of the 2003 Daytona race which ironically Kvapil also lost.

Top ten results:

Pos.	No.	Driver	Truck	Team
1.	60	Jack Sprague	Toyota	Wyler Racing
2.	23	Johnny Benson	Toyota	Bill Davis Racing
3.	6	Travis Kvapil	Ford	Roush Fenway Racing
4.	5	Mike Skinner	Toyota	Bill Davis Racing
5.	30	Todd Bodine	Toyota	Germain Racing
6.	09	Joey Clanton	Ford	Wood Brothers/JTG Racing
7.	33	Ron Hornaday Jr.	Chevrolet	Kevin Harvick, Inc.
8.	88	Matt Crafton	Chevrolet	ThorSport Racing
9.	9	Ted Musgrave	Toyota	Germain Racing
10.	14	Rick Crawford	Ford	Circle Bar Racing

Failed to qualify: Wayne Edwards (No. 95)

=== San Bernardino County 200 ===
This race was held February 23 at California Speedway. Carl Edwards won the pole in the Roush Fenway Racing No. 50 truck. On one of the 2nd from the final restart No. 33 Ron Hornaday Jr. spun out No. 21 Mark Martin due to a slow restart, the caution flag was soon waved but not until after No. 5 Mike Skinner made the pass for the lead. NASCAR did not issue any penalties to the No. 33 team and Mark Martin after the spin ended up finishing 23rd. On the final restart, Skinner held off No. 33 Ron Hornaday to get his first truck series win since last year at Las Vegas.

Top ten results:

Pos.	No.	Driver	Truck	Team
1.	5	Mike Skinner	Toyota	Bill Davis Racing
2.	33	Ron Hornaday Jr.	Chevrolet	Kevin Harvick, Inc.
3.	60	Jack Sprague	Toyota	Wyler Racing
4.	50	Carl Edwards	Ford	Roush Fenway Racing
5.	9	Ted Musgrave	Toyota	Germain Racing
6.	23	Johnny Benson	Toyota	Bill Davis Racing
7.	30	Todd Bodine	Toyota	Germain Racing
8.	2	Kevin Harvick	Chevrolet	Kevin Harvick, Inc.
9.	14	Rick Crawford	Ford	Circle Bar Racing
10.	40	Mike Bliss	Chevrolet	Key Motorsports

Failed to qualify: None (34 entries)

=== American Commercial Lines 200 ===
The American Commercial Lines 200 was held March 16 at Atlanta Motor Speedway. Mike Skinner won the pole. In another exciting race for the NCTS, Nextel Cup Series regular Clint Bowyer held the lead on a restart with seven laps to go. While he tried to bunch up the field on a restart, California winner Mike Skinner bumped Bowyer out of the way and went on to win his second consecutive race. Despite the bump and run, Bowyer finished 5th.

Top ten results:

Pos.	No.	Driver	Truck	Team
1.	5	Mike Skinner	Toyota	Bill Davis Racing
2.	30	Todd Bodine	Toyota	Germain Racing
3.	88	Matt Crafton	Chevrolet	ThorSport Racing
4.	10	Rick Crawford	Ford	Circle Bar Racing
5.	2	Clint Bowyer	Chevrolet	Kevin Harvick, Inc.
6.	77	Brendan Gaughan	Chevrolet	South Point Racing
7.	75	Dennis Setzer	Chevrolet	Spears Motorsports
8.	9	Ted Musgrave	Toyota	Germain Racing
9.	09	Joey Clanton	Ford	Wood Brothers/JTG Racing
10.	21	Kelly Bires	Ford	Wood Brothers/JTG Racing

Failed to qualify: None (35 entries)

=== Kroger 250 ===
The Kroger 250 was held on March 31 at Martinsville Speedway. Mike Skinner won the pole. Skinner would win his third consecutive race and second in a row from pole. Skinner dominated the Martinsville short track, leading 246 laps, easily breaking Rich Bickle's old record of leading 204 laps en route to victory in 1997.

Top ten results:

Pos.	No.	Driver	Truck	Team
1.	5	Mike Skinner	Toyota	Bill Davis Racing
2.	30	Todd Bodine	Toyota	Germain Racing
3.	14	Rick Crawford	Ford	Circle Bar Racing
4.	2	Kevin Harvick	Chevrolet	Kevin Harvick, Inc.
5.	9	Ted Musgrave	Toyota	Germain Racing
6.	33	Ron Hornaday Jr.	Chevrolet	Kevin Harvick, Inc.
7.	1	Aaron Fike	Toyota	Red Horse Racing
8.	36	Tyler Walker	Toyota	Bill Davis Racing
9.	46	Timothy Peters	Chevrolet	Morgan-Dollar Motorsports
10.	23	Johnny Benson	Toyota	Bill Davis Racing

Failed to qualify: Bradley Riethmeyer (No. 49), Brian Sockwell (No. 54), Shane Sieg (No. 28), Chris Jones (No. 87), Tim Cowen (No. 42)

=== O'Reilly Auto Parts 250 ===
The O'Reilly Auto Parts 250 was held on April 28 at Kansas Speedway. This race was moved from its traditional July weekend to late April in hopes of cooler temperatures. It was also held in conjunction with the IndyCar Series' event, the Kansas Indy 300. The race was dominated by 2006 Raybestos Rookie of the Year Erik Darnell, who would lead 91 of 166 laps en route to his first career NCTS victory. Darnell's win ended the win streak of Mike Skinner, who started from the pole but had trouble in the pits.

Top ten results:

Pos.	No.	Driver	Truck	Team
1.	99	Erik Darnell	Ford	Roush Fenway Racing
2.	14	Rick Crawford	Ford	Circle Bar Racing
3.	60	Jack Sprague	Toyota	Wyler Racing
4.	23	Johnny Benson	Toyota	Bill Davis Racing
5.	5	Mike Skinner	Toyota	Bill Davis Racing
6.	33	Ron Hornaday Jr.	Chevrolet	Kevin Harvick, Inc.
7.	30	Todd Bodine	Toyota	Germain Racing
8.	1	Aaron Fike	Toyota	Red Horse Racing
9.	59	Terry Cook	Toyota	HT Motorsports
10.	88	Matt Crafton	Chevrolet	ThorSport Racing

Failed to qualify: None (36 entries)

=== Quaker Steak & Lube 200 ===
The Quaker Steak & Lube 200 was held on May 18 at Lowe's Motor Speedway. Mike Skinner won the pole. The race saw a classic showdown between truck series veteran Ron Hornaday Jr. and Nextel Cup Series rookie A. J. Allmendinger. However, the veteran stole the show by passing Allmendinger with 36 laps to go. It looked like Hornaday might coast to victory, but Johnny Benson, who had already been in controversy during the week, cut a tire with 11 laps to go. However, Hornaday held off Allmendinger and Todd Bodine to take his first truck victory of the season. The win also gave Chevrolet its first truck win since Texas last year.

Top ten results:

Pos.	No.	Driver	Truck	Team
1.	33	Ron Hornaday Jr.	Chevrolet	Kevin Harvick, Inc.
2.	00	A. J. Allmendinger	Toyota	Darrell Waltrip Motorsports
3.	30	Todd Bodine	Toyota	Germain Racing
4.	21	Mark Martin	Ford	Wood Brothers/JTG Racing
5.	9	Ted Musgrave	Toyota	Germain Racing
6.	16	Mike Bliss	Ford	Xpress Motorsports
7.	88	Matt Crafton	Chevrolet	ThorSport Racing
8.	5	Mike Skinner	Toyota	Bill Davis Racing
9.	50	T. J. Bell	Ford	Roush Fenway Racing
10.	14	Rick Crawford	Ford	Circle Bar Racing

Failed to qualify: Jason White (No. 7)

Johnny Benson allowed a non-licensed NASCAR driver to test his truck, and was assessed a 50-point penalty.

=== NCTS Ohio 250 ===
The NCTS Ohio 250 was held on May 26 at Mansfield Motorsports Park. Mike Skinner won the pole. In a race that featured much attrition and varying strategies, it seemed as though Matt Crafton would be able to end his 154 race winless drought by going on an unbelievable no-stop strategy. However, two six-hour rain delays held up his goal. Although Crafton had the lead after the delay, he soon lost the top spot to Rick Crawford and would eventually blow out a tire. Crawford, meanwhile, dominated the race, leading the most laps, as his only contenders were rookie Aaron Fike and "Short Track Slayer" Dennis Setzer. When it seemed as though Crawford would sail to an easy win, he cut down a tire with 11 laps to go, handing the lead to Setzer. For Setzer, it had been almost 2 years since he last won a race, and for his Spears Racing team, they had not won since Phoenix in 2004. The crafty veteran outlasted the competition on a shocking no stop strategy to win. Second-place finisher Jack Sprague said that it was unbelievable that Setzer won without pitting.

Top ten results:

Pos.	No.	Driver	Truck	Team
1.	75	Dennis Setzer	Chevrolet	Spears Motorsports
2.	60	Jack Sprague	Toyota	Wyler Racing
3.	18	Ken Schrader	Dodge	Bobby Hamilton Racing
4.	5	Mike Skinner	Toyota	Bill Davis Racing
5.	23	Johnny Benson	Toyota	Bill Davis Racing
6.	33	Ron Hornaday Jr.	Chevrolet	Kevin Harvick, Inc.
7.	6	Travis Kvapil	Ford	Roush Fenway Racing
8.	9	Ted Musgrave	Toyota	Germain Racing
9.	77	Brendan Gaughan	Chevrolet	South Point Racing
10.	4	Kevin Hamlin	Dodge	Bobby Hamilton Racing

Failed to qualify: Kelly Sutton (No. 51)

=== AAA Insurance 200 ===
The AAA Insurance 200 was held June 1 at Dover International Speedway. Mike Skinner won his sixth consecutive pole. This race was a historic milestone for the NASCAR Craftsman Truck Series, as it was the series' 300th race. The race featured early attrition, including a six-truck pileup on the first lap involving Cup drivers Clint Bowyer and Ken Schrader, along with truck drivers Brendan Gaughan, Bill Lester, Erik Darnell, and Jack Sprague. From the outset, it appeared as though Kyle Busch would walk away with another victory at Dover. However, Ron Hornaday Jr. began to catch up to Busch, who was having handling problems. Hornaday would eventually win by 7 seconds over Stacy Compton.

Top ten results:

Pos.	No.	Driver	Truck	Team
1.	33	Ron Hornaday Jr.	Chevrolet	Kevin Harvick, Inc.
2.	09	Stacy Compton	Ford	Wood Brothers/JTG Racing
3.	6	Travis Kvapil	Ford	Roush Fenway Racing
4.	23	Johnny Benson	Toyota	Bill Davis Racing
5.	4	Mike Bliss	Dodge	Bobby Hamilton Racing
6.	21	Mark Martin	Ford	Wood Brothers/JTG Racing
7.	5	Mike Skinner	Toyota	Bill Davis Racing
8.	59	Terry Cook	Toyota	HT Motorsports
9.	00	A. J. Allmendinger	Toyota	Darrell Waltrip Motorsports
10.	1	Aaron Fike	Toyota	Red Horse Racing

Failed to qualify: None (36 entries)

=== Sam's Town 400 ===
The Sam's Town 400 was held June 8 at Texas Motor Speedway. Todd Bodine won the pole, breaking Mike Skinner's six pole streak. The race was action-packed, and fuel mileage and strategy became a factor late in the race. With only a few laps to go, Travis Kvapil, looking for his first NCTS victory since 2004, was leading on a restart when he was bumped by Todd Bodine. Points leader Mike Skinner chased Bodine down but did not have enough for the eventual winner.

Top ten results:

Pos.	No.	Driver	Truck	Team
1.	30	Todd Bodine	Toyota	Germain Racing
2.	5	Mike Skinner	Toyota	Bill Davis Racing
3.	14	Rick Crawford	Ford	Circle Bar Racing
4.	33	Ron Hornaday Jr.	Chevrolet	Kevin Harvick, Inc.
5.	10	David Starr	Ford	Circle Bar Racing
6.	6	Travis Kvapil	Ford	Roush Fenway Racing
7.	88	Matt Crafton	Chevrolet	ThorSport Racing
8.	18	Ken Schrader	Dodge	Bobby Hamilton Racing
9.	9	Ted Musgrave	Toyota	Germain Racing
10.	21	Stacy Compton	Ford	Wood Brothers/JTG Racing

Failed to qualify: None (35 entries)

=== Michigan 200 ===
The Michigan 200 was held on June 16 at Michigan International Speedway. Travis Kvapil won the pole. The race was dominated by part-time Nextel Cup Series driver Mark Martin, who led for 35 laps before retiring with a blown engine. After Martin's exit, the race lead was handed over to another Cup driver, Kyle Busch, who appeared to have another truck win in sight but was battling an extremely loose truck. Eventually, after 99 laps of hard racing, polesitter Travis Kvapil took advantage of Busch's problems and passed him coming to the white flag. Kvapil would hold on to win his first race since 2004.

Top ten results:

Pos.	No.	Driver	Truck	Team
1.	6	Travis Kvapil	Ford	Roush Fenway Racing
2.	51	Kyle Busch	Chevrolet	Billy Ballew Motorsports
3.	77	Brendan Gaughan	Chevrolet	South Point Racing
4.	5	Mike Skinner	Toyota	Bill Davis Racing
5.	9	Ted Musgrave	Toyota	Germain Racing
6.	14	Rick Crawford	Ford	Circle Bar Racing
7.	30	Todd Bodine	Toyota	Germain Racing
8.	2	Kevin Harvick	Chevrolet	Kevin Harvick, Inc.
9.	23	Johnny Benson	Toyota	Bill Davis Racing
10.	33	Ron Hornaday Jr.	Chevrolet	Kevin Harvick, Inc.

Failed to qualify: Bryan Silas (No. 71)

=== Toyota Tundra Milwaukee 200 ===
The Toyota Tundra Milwaukee 200 took place June 22 at the Milwaukee Mile. Mike Skinner won the pole. Like most races of the 2007 NCTS season, Mike Skinner dominated the first half of the race, leading 103 laps. However, defending winner Johnny Benson was looking to jumpstart his season. Benson Jr. would eventually pass Skinner just past the halfway mark and would not look back, leading 96 laps en route to his first victory of the season. Ted Musgrave suffered a 50-point penalty after intentionally wrecking another truck while under caution.

Top ten results:

Pos.	No.	Driver	Truck	Team
1.	23	Johnny Benson	Toyota	Bill Davis Racing
2.	33	Ron Hornaday Jr.	Chevrolet	Kevin Harvick, Inc.
3.	30	Todd Bodine	Toyota	Germain Racing
4.	5	Mike Skinner	Toyota	Bill Davis Racing
5.	14	Rick Crawford	Ford	Circle Bar Racing
6.	99	Erik Darnell	Ford	Roush Fenway Racing
7.	4	Mike Bliss	Dodge	Bobby Hamilton Racing
8.	6	Travis Kvapil	Ford	Roush Fenway Racing
9.	88	Matt Crafton	Chevrolet	ThorSport Racing
10.	10	David Starr	Ford	Circle Bar Racing

Failed to qualify: None (36 entries)

=== O'Reilly 200 ===
The O'Reilly 200 was held June 30 at Memphis Motorsports Park. Brad Keselowski won his first career pole. Subbing for a suspended Ted Musgrave, Keselowski had, as race analyst Phil Parsons called it, "the biggest night of his career". Keselowski was recommended by NASCAR veterans such as Mark Martin and Todd Bodine. He led the first 20 laps from pole before being passed by veteran Ron Hornaday Jr. However, as Ron's truck faded, Keselowski's got better and had the truck to beat, with his only competitor being 2002 Memphis winner Travis Kvapil. Brad was leading with 9 laps to go until Kvapil took advantage of Keselowski's loose truck and unintentionally spun him off at turn 4. Keselowski would end the bittersweet night in 16th, but his performance would catch the attention of Dale Earnhardt Jr., who offered Keselowski a seat at JR Motorsports in the Busch Series. With the polesitter out of contention, the race was in the hands of Kvapil, who held off a hard charging Jack Sprague to win.

Top ten results:

Pos.	No.	Driver	Truck	Team
1.	6	Travis Kvapil	Ford	Roush Fenway Racing
2.	60	Jack Sprague	Toyota	Wyler Racing
3.	33	Ron Hornaday Jr.	Chevrolet	Kevin Harvick, Inc.
4.	5	Mike Skinner	Toyota	Bill Davis Racing
5.	1	Aaron Fike	Toyota	Red Horse Racing
6.	36	Ryan Mathews	Toyota	Bill Davis Racing
7.	23	Johnny Benson	Toyota	Bill Davis Racing
8.	30	Todd Bodine	Toyota	Germain Racing
9.	99	Erik Darnell	Ford	Roush Fenway Racing
10.	88	Matt Crafton	Chevrolet	ThorSport Racing

Failed to qualify: None (36 entries)

=== Built Ford Tough 225 presented by Greater Cincinnati Ford Dealers ===
The Built Ford Tough 225 took place on July 14 at Kentucky Speedway. Ryan Mathews won his first career pole. However, it was African American driver Bill Lester to lead the first lap as Mathews struggled on restarts all night. As a testament to the competitive nature at Kentucky Speedway, there were four lead changes in the first eight laps of the race. The race, like many others, would end up being dominated by Mike Skinner, who led the field for 135 of 150 laps en route to cruising to his fourth win of the season. Travis Kvapil suffered a 25-point penalty for an illegal part found in his truck during post race inspection.

Top ten results:

Pos.	No.	Driver	Truck	Team
1.	5	Mike Skinner	Toyota	Bill Davis Racing
2.	6	Travis Kvapil	Ford	Roush Fenway Racing
3.	9	Ted Musgrave	Toyota	Germain Racing
4.	22	Ryan Mathews	Toyota	Bill Davis Racing
5.	1	David Green	Toyota	Red Horse Racing
6.	21	Jon Wood	Ford	Wood Brothers/JTG Racing
7.	09	Joey Clanton	Ford	Wood Brothers/JTG Racing
8.	15	Bill Lester	Chevrolet	Billy Ballew Motorsports
9.	4	Mike Bliss	Dodge	Bobby Hamilton Racing
10.	33	Ron Hornaday Jr.	Chevrolet	Kevin Harvick, Inc.

Failed to qualify: None (36 entries)

=== Power Stroke Diesel 200 ===
The Power Stroke Diesel 200 took place July 27 at O'Reilly Raceway Park. Mike Skinner won the pole as qualifying was rained out and set by owners points.

Top ten results:

Pos.	No.	Driver	Truck	Team
1.	33	Ron Hornaday Jr.	Chevrolet	Kevin Harvick, Inc.
2.	23	Johnny Benson	Toyota	Bill Davis Racing
3.	6	Travis Kvapil	Ford	Roush Fenway Racing
4.	14	Rick Crawford	Ford	Circle Bar Racing
5.	18	Ken Schrader	Dodge	Bobby Hamilton Racing
6.	30	Todd Bodine	Toyota	Germain Racing
7.	99	Erik Darnell	Ford	Roush Fenway Racing
8.	47	Regan Smith	Chevrolet	Morgan-Dollar Motorsports
9.	60	Jack Sprague	Toyota	Wyler Racing
10.	77	Brendan Gaughan	Chevrolet	South Point Racing

Failed to qualify: Bradley Riethmeyer (No. 53)

=== Toyota Tundra 200 ===
The Toyota Tundra 200 took place August 11 at Nashville Superspeedway. Mike Skinner won the pole. Skinner dominated the race, leading the first 102 laps. However, multiple encounters with lap traffic hampered his chances for victory, and 2003 NCTS champ Travis Kvapil took the lead from him on a green flag run. During the final 50 lap stretch, Kvapil held off restart master Ron Hornaday Jr. to take his first win at Nashville. Kvapil later dedicated the race to Bobby Hamilton who won the race in 2004 en route to his championship.

Top ten results:

Pos.	No.	Driver	Truck	Team
1.	6	Travis Kvapil	Ford	Roush Fenway Racing
2.	33	Ron Hornaday Jr.	Chevrolet	Kevin Harvick, Inc.
3.	5	Mike Skinner	Toyota	Bill Davis Racing
4.	10	David Starr	Ford	Circle Bar Racing
5.	30	Todd Bodine	Toyota	Germain Racing
6.	14	Rick Crawford	Ford	Circle Bar Racing
7.	21	Jon Wood	Ford	Wood Brothers/JTG Racing
8.	9	Ted Musgrave	Toyota	Germain Racing
9.	99	Erik Darnell	Ford	Roush Fenway Racing
10.	09	Joey Clanton	Ford	Wood Brothers/JTG Racing

Failed to qualify: None (36 entries)

=== O'Reilly Auto Parts 200 presented by Valvoline Maxlife ===
The O'Reilly 200 presented by Valvoline Maxlife was held August 22 at the newly repaved Bristol Motor Speedway. Travis Kvapil won the pole. The resurfacing of BMS would present exciting racing in the 200-lap race. With the old concrete, there was much more single file racing on the bottom groove, but the new progressively banked surface allowed for the use of the outside lane, which had not been used in years. From the start, it seemed as though Kvapil would walk away with another victory. However, crew chief for the No. 23 Toyota, Trip Bruce, had other ideas. Calling his driver, Johnny Benson, onto pit road on lap 40 with other trucks having pitted on a previous caution, race analyst Michael Waltrip criticized his plan, writing them out of contention. With 30 to go, however, the entire race would change. Nextel Cup Series regular Kyle Busch and Kvapil battled for the lead, but Busch's loose truck caused him to slide into Kvapil, sending them both spinning. This incident handed the lead to a charging Benson Jr.. Not even a red flag for a spin by Todd Bodine could stop "JB" who held off Brendan Gaughan and defending winner Mark Martin for his second victory in 2007.

Top ten results:

Pos.	No.	Driver	Truck	Team
1.	23	Johnny Benson	Toyota	Bill Davis Racing
2.	77	Brendan Gaughan	Chevrolet	South Point Racing
3.	21	Mark Martin	Ford	Wood Brothers/JTG Racing
4.	5	Mike Skinner	Toyota	Bill Davis Racing
5.	14	Rick Crawford	Ford	Circle Bar Racing
6.	33	Ron Hornaday Jr.	Chevrolet	Kevin Harvick, Inc.
7.	4	Mike Bliss	Dodge	Bobby Hamilton Racing
8.	60	Jack Sprague	Toyota	Wyler Racing
9.	2	Cale Gale	Chevrolet	Kevin Harvick, Inc.
10.	50	Danny O'Quinn Jr.	Ford	Roush Fenway Racing

Failed to qualify: Brian Sockwell (No. 54)

=== Missouri/Illinois Dodge Dealers Ram Tough 200 ===
The Missouri/Illinois Dodge Dealers Ram Tough 200 was held September 1 at Gateway International Raceway. Mike Skinner won the pole. Although Skinner would lead the first 19 laps, his chances of victory would end with a cut right front tire, sending him hard into the wall. Skinner, with his crew, would repair the truck and later return to the race. With Skinner in the garage, the race lead would turn to his championship rival, Ron Hornaday Jr., who dominated the race. However, fellow contender Johnny Benson took advantage of Hornaday's loose truck, passing him with 13 laps to go and holding of the "Restart Master" for his second consecutive win, albeit under caution, as Ryan Mathews crashed on the final lap.

Top ten results:

Pos.	No.	Driver	Truck	Team
1.	23	Johnny Benson	Toyota	Bill Davis Racing
2.	33	Ron Hornaday Jr.	Chevrolet	Kevin Harvick, Inc.
3.	9	Ted Musgrave	Toyota	Germain Racing
4.	30	Todd Bodine	Toyota	Germain Racing
5.	47	Regan Smith	Chevrolet	Morgan-Dollar Motorsports
6.	6	Travis Kvapil	Ford	Roush Fenway Racing
7.	99	Erik Darnell	Ford	Roush Fenway Racing
8.	00	Josh Wise	Toyota	Michael Waltrip Racing
9.	88	Matt Crafton	Chevrolet	ThorSport Racing
10.	77	Brendan Gaughan	Chevrolet	South Point Racing

Failed to qualify: None (36 entries)

=== New Hampshire 200 ===
The New Hampshire 200 was held September 15 at New Hampshire International Speedway. As qualifying was rained out, Ron Hornaday Jr. won the pole based on owners points. From pole, Hornaday crushed the field, leading 174 of 200 laps en route to his second win of the season. Hornaday also became the first repeat NCTS winner at Loudon and extended his points lead over Mike Skinner by 29 points.

Top ten results:

Pos.	No.	Driver	Truck	Team
1.	33	Ron Hornaday Jr.	Chevrolet	Kevin Harvick, Inc.
2.	99	Erik Darnell	Ford	Roush Fenway Racing
3.	5	Mike Skinner	Toyota	Bill Davis Racing
4.	30	Todd Bodine	Toyota	Germain Racing
5.	4	Mike Bliss	Dodge	Bobby Hamilton Racing
6.	14	Rick Crawford	Ford	Circle Bar Racing
7.	9	Ted Musgrave	Toyota	Germain Racing
8.	23	Johnny Benson	Toyota	Bill Davis Racing
9.	21	Jon Wood	Ford	Wood Brothers/JTG Racing
10.	15	Shane Sieg	Chevrolet	Billy Ballew Motorsports

Failed to qualify: Sean Caisse (No. 03)

=== Smith's Las Vegas 350 ===
The Smith's Las Vegas 350 was held September 22 at the Las Vegas Motor Speedway. Travis Kvapil won the pole. This race marked the historic debut of two open wheel drivers, 1995 Indianapolis 500 winner Jacques Villeneuve and 1996 Indianapolis 500 winner Buddy Lazier. This race also highlighted the tight points championship between two former champions in Ron Hornaday Jr. and Mike Skinner, with Skinner trailing by 29 points. With the new repaved surface, exciting 2 and 3 wide racing was expected. In his debut, Villeneuve impressed many by starting 7th. However, he was involved in an altercation with the No. 16 of Brian Scott and would finish 21st. Lazier would also struggle, going down a lap early and finishing 24th. The early run had the typical affair of Todd Bodine, Travis Kvapil, Ron Hornaday Jr., and even Chad McCumbee running up front. However, trucks such as those of Jon Wood and Stacy Compton would later reach the front. Wood, who was running part-time in the trucks after an illness, took command of the race, holding off championship contenders such as Johnny Benson and Kvapil. With Skinner struggling with his truck, it looked like Hornaday would extend his points lead heading into Talladega. However, a blown tire with 11 to go not only erased Hornaday's point lead, but gave Mike Skinner a 3-point advantage. Within the race, the win would come down to the trucks of Jon Wood, Travis Kvapil, and Johnny Benson. Wood exhausted the truck throughout the run and would have nothing left for Kvapil and Benson Jr., settling for 3rd. Benson Jr., going for his fourth win of the season, charged Kvapil from the low line, but Kvapil had enough momentum to hold off Benson Jr. for his fourth win of 2007.

Top ten results:

Pos.	No.	Driver	Truck	Team
1.	6	Travis Kvapil	Ford	Roush Fenway Racing
2.	23	Johnny Benson	Toyota	Bill Davis Racing
3.	21	Jon Wood	Ford	Wood Brothers/JTG Racing
4.	59	Terry Cook	Toyota	HT Motorsports
5.	99	Erik Darnell	Ford	Roush Fenway Racing
6.	00	Josh Wise	Toyota	Michael Waltrip Racing
7.	18	Dennis Setzer	Dodge	Bobby Hamilton Racing
8.	09	Stacy Compton	Ford	Wood Brothers/JTG Racing
9.	14	Rick Crawford	Ford	Circle Bar Racing
10.	8	Chad McCumbee	Chevrolet	MRD Motorsports

Failed to qualify: None (36 entries)

NOTE: Bobby Dotter replaced Casey Kingsland in the No. 06 in the race.

=== Mountain Dew 250 ===
The Mountain Dew 250 was held on October 6 at Talladega Superspeedway. Todd Bodine won the pole. Of note, 1997 Formula One world champion Jacques Villeneuve made another strong statement in qualifying 10th for the race. Tight packs of 2, 3, and even 4 wide racing was anticipated, based on the excitement of the inaugural race in 2006. The championship race between Mike Skinner, Ron Hornaday Jr., Travis Kvapil, and defending champion Todd Bodine continued to tighten. The pivotal point in the race came on lap 73 as Jack Sprague, who is in the midst of a difficult year, cut a tire down while leading. Johnny Benson, who ironically pushed Sprague to the win at Daytona, got into the back of his slowing car, triggering "The Big One". The crash collected contenders Hornaday and Kvapil, although the former was able to rally to a top 10 finish. After the crash, points leader Skinner had problems in the form of a loosened hood pin. The pin eventually broke off and his hood began to flap wildly, prompting NASCAR to black flag him. However, as soon as Skinner was about to pit under green, the truck of Mike Wallace spun, allowing Skinner to remain on the lead lap. With only two laps to go, the racing became tighter than ever, as Rick Crawford and Benson Jr. would use the draft to go three wide with Bodine in the tri-oval, but Crawford would come up short by only 0.014 seconds.

Top ten results:

Pos.	No.	Driver	Truck	Team
1.	30	Todd Bodine	Toyota	Germain Racing
2.	14	Rick Crawford	Ford	Circle Bar Racing
3.	23	Johnny Benson	Toyota	Bill Davis Racing
4.	1	Jason Leffler	Toyota	Red Horse Racing
5.	18	Dennis Setzer	Dodge	Bobby Hamilton Racing
6.	13	Willie Allen	Chevrolet	ThorSport Racing
7.	33	Ron Hornaday Jr.	Chevrolet	Kevin Harvick, Inc.
8.	40	Chad Chaffin	Chevrolet	Key Motorsports
9.	47	Regan Smith	Chevrolet	Dale Earnhardt, Inc.
10.	21	Jon Wood	Ford	Wood Brothers/JTG Racing

Failed to qualify: None (36 entries)

=== Kroger 200 ===
The Kroger 200 was held October 20 at Martinsville Speedway. Defending winner Jack Sprague won the pole. This race marked the NASCAR debut of 2007 Indianapolis 500 winner and 2007 IndyCar Series champion Dario Franchitti. The race would be dominated by Terry Cook, using a no stop strategy similar to the one Dennis Setzer used to win earlier in the year at Mansfield Motorsports Speedway. With huge accidents taking out both Franchitti and Jacques Villeneuve, and a scary crash involving Tim Sauter, the race would be decided by a bump. Exiting the second turn with two to go, Sprague tried to pull a bump and run on Cook. It was successful, but it allowed former points leader Mike Skinner to slip past both drivers and sweep both races at Martinsville.

Top ten results:

Pos.	No.	Driver	Truck	Team
1.	5	Mike Skinner	Toyota	Bill Davis Racing
2.	60	Jack Sprague	Toyota	Wyler Racing
3.	33	Ron Hornaday Jr.	Chevrolet	Kevin Harvick, Inc.
4.	10	David Starr	Ford	Circle Bar Racing
5.	14	Rick Crawford	Ford	Circle Bar Racing
6.	4	Mike Bliss	Dodge	Bobby Hamilton Racing
7.	40	Chad Chaffin	Chevrolet	Key Motorsports
8.	9	Ted Musgrave	Toyota	Germain Racing
9.	23	Johnny Benson	Toyota	Bill Davis Racing
10.	18	Dennis Setzer	Dodge	Bobby Hamilton Racing

Failed to qualify: Jason White (No. 7), Tim Cowen (No. 42), Davin Scites (No. 06), Cory Collum (No. 32), Joe Ruttman (No. 53), John Coffman (No. 58)

=== EasyCare Vehicle Service Contracts 200 ===
The EasyCare Vehicle Service Contracts 200 was held October 27 at Atlanta Motor Speedway. Ron Hornaday Jr. won the pole. As the epic points battle between Hornaday and Mike Skinner continued, the battle would seem to run in favor of Hornaday, who led 51 laps. However, lurking would be the No. 51 truck of Kyle Busch, who led the race high of 65 laps. However, before sailing to his second consecutive Atlanta victory, Kyle would have a major problem. For most of the latter half of the race, Busch put on a stellar performance, not only running up front but holding up his window net up with his left hand. In the end, it would be of no use, as NASCAR officials eventually black flagged Busch. Right before he pitted, Busch got a break in the form of a caution. This allowed him to rectify the window net problem and stay in contention. Busch would later pull off the pass of "King of Restarts" Hornaday with 7 laps to go, ironically on a restart. Busch would hold on to become the first Nextel Cup Series driver to win a Truck Series race in 2007.

Top ten results:

Pos.	No.	Driver	Manu.	Team
1.	51	Kyle Busch	Chevrolet	Billy Ballew Motorsports
2.	33	Ron Hornaday Jr.	Chevrolet	Kevin Harvick, Inc.
3.	23	Johnny Benson	Toyota	Bill Davis Racing
4.	21	Mark Martin	Ford	Wood Brothers/JTG Racing
5.	5	Mike Skinner	Toyota	Bill Davis Racing
6.	09	Joey Clanton	Ford	Wood Brothers/JTG Racing
7.	88	Matt Crafton	Chevrolet	ThorSport Racing
8.	77	Brendan Gaughan	Chevrolet	South Point Racing
9.	9	Ted Musgrave	Toyota	Germain Racing
10.	59	Terry Cook	Toyota	HT Motorsports

Failed to qualify: None (36 entries)

=== Silverado 350K ===
The Silverado 350K was held November 2 at Texas Motor Speedway. Mike Skinner won the pole. Although the early part of the race would be dominated by Ted Musgrave, the overall race would primarily be dominated by championship contenders Skinner and Ron Hornaday Jr., with Skinner leading the most laps at 40. This race also saw the championship hopes of Travis Kvapil and Todd Bodine end. As with most Friday night truck races under the lights, the final few laps created a fast and crazy finish. On a restart with 8 to go, Skinner would challenge the Hornaday for the lead on the outside heading onto the backstretch. However, Chad McCumbee made a bold move on both championship contenders, making it three wide heading into turn 3. As McCumbee took the lead, Hornaday sailed up the racetrack and into Skinner, causing a pileup involving Musgrave, Matt Crafton, and Erik Darnell. After the red flag was lifted, McCumbee spun his tires on the green-white-checkered restart. With two-time Texas winner Jack Sprague right behind him, McCumbee attempted to block Sprague, who subsequently hooked his quarter panel, sending them both into the wall. McCumbee would take 13th place while Sprague got 6th. Avoiding the carnage, Musgrave would take the checkered flag for the first time in 66 races. After the first wreck, polesitter Skinner would amazingly rally to finish third and extend his points lead.

Top ten results:

Pos.	No.	Driver	Manu.	Team
1	9	Ted Musgrave	Toyota	Germain Racing
2	77	Brendan Gaughan	Chevrolet	South Point Racing
3	5	Mike Skinner	Toyota	Bill Davis Racing
4	4	Mike Bliss	Dodge	Bobby Hamilton Racing
5	14	Rick Crawford	Ford	Circle Bar Racing
6	60	Jack Sprague	Toyota	Wyler Racing
7	88	Matt Crafton	Chevrolet	ThorSport Racing
8	21	Jon Wood	Ford	Wood Brothers/JTG Racing
9	1	Jason Leffler	Toyota	Red Horse Racing
10	07	Tim Sauter	Chevrolet	Green Light Racing

Failed to qualify: Wayne Edwards (No. 12)

=== Casino Arizona 150 ===
The Casino Arizona 150 was held November 9 at Phoenix International Raceway. Mike Skinner won his record-breaking eleventh pole. The Skinner vs. Hornaday title fight would continue here, as controversy was throughout the race. First, Hornaday's teammate/owner, Kevin Harvick, drove through Skinner's pit stall to get to his pit. Although this is legal, it caused Skinner's entire crew to lose their timing, dropping him out of the top 10. The biggest crash of the night came with only 13 laps left. Jacques Villeneuve made contact with Stacy Compton, turning him into the frontstretch wall. Grand-Am driver Andy Lally was struck by Compton's truck, forcing him hard into the inside barrier, which broke apart. After the subsequent red flag to fix the wall, Kyle Busch would come into the picture, holding off Hornaday and Mike Bliss for the win. More controversy would occur outside of the top 5, as Johnny Benson, Skinner's teammate, passed him late in the race despite the looming championship.

Top ten results:

Pos.	No.	Driver	Manu.	Team
1	51	Kyle Busch	Chevrolet	Billy Ballew Motorsports
2	33	Ron Hornaday Jr.	Chevrolet	Kevin Harvick, Inc.
3	4	Mike Bliss	Dodge	Bobby Hamilton Racing
4	1	Jason Leffler	Toyota	Red Horse Racing
5	2	Kevin Harvick	Chevrolet	Kevin Harvick, Inc.
6	30	Todd Bodine	Toyota	Germain Racing
7	23	Johnny Benson	Toyota	Bill Davis Racing
8	5	Mike Skinner	Toyota	Bill Davis Racing
9	18	Dennis Setzer	Dodge	Bobby Hamilton Racing
10	60	Jack Sprague	Toyota	Wyler Racing

Failed to qualify: Tim Schendel (No. 31), Jason White (No. 7)

=== Ford 200 ===
The Ford 200 was held November 16 at Homestead-Miami Speedway. The championship battle between Mike Skinner and Ron Hornaday Jr. concluded here. This also kicked off the first of the three days known as "Ford Championship Weekend". The three-way fight for Rookie of the Year concluded here, the contestants being Busch Series veteran Tim Sauter, and short track racers Willie Allen and Joey Clanton. Jon Wood won the pole, setting a new track record with a time of 31.180 at a speed of 173.188 mph. Open wheel export Jacques Villeneuve continued to show his qualifying expertise, starting third. Championship contenders Skinner and Hornaday started fourth and eighth, respectively.

Skinner would prove to have a difficult race, first having to pit for a flat right side tire and then having a left rear tire come completely off the truck. Due to these problems Skinner would finish 35th, while Hornaday would finish 7th and take the championship. Johnny Benson would pass Kyle Busch at the white flag to take his fourth win of '07. Hornaday's championship would tie future teammate Jack Sprague for most NCTS championships with 3.

Top ten results:

Pos.	No.	Driver	Manu.	Team
1	23	Johnny Benson	Toyota	Bill Davis Racing
2	51	Kyle Busch	Chevrolet	Billy Ballew Motorsports
3	14	Rick Crawford	Ford	Circle Bar Racing
4	2	Kevin Harvick	Chevrolet	Kevin Harvick, Inc.
5	1	Jason Leffler	Toyota	Red Horse Racing
6	10	David Starr	Ford	Circle Bar Racing
7	33	Ron Hornaday Jr.	Chevrolet	Kevin Harvick, Inc.
8	03	Justin Marks	Toyota	Germain Racing
9	47	Regan Smith	Chevrolet	Dale Earnhardt, Inc.
10	22	Dave Blaney	Toyota	Bill Davis Racing

Failed to qualify: Scott Lynch (No. 63), Kevin Lepage (No. 86), Tim Schendel (No. 31), Jason White (No. 7), Bryan Silas (No. 71)

== Full Drivers' Championship ==
(key) Bold – Pole position awarded by time. Italics – Pole position set by owner's points. * – Most laps led.

Pos	Driver	DAY	CAL	ATL	MAR	KAN	CLT	MFD	DOV	TEX	MCH	MIL	MEM	KEN	IRP	NSH	BRI	GTW	NHA	LVS	TAL	MAR	ATL	TEX	PHO	HOM	Points
1	Ron Hornaday Jr.	7	2	11	6	6	1*	6	1*	4*	10	2	3	10	1	2	6	2*	1*	22	7	3	**2**	18	2	7	3982
2	Mike Skinner	4	1	**1***	**1***	**5**	**8**	**4**	**7**	2	4	**4**	4	1*	20	**3**	4	28	3	13	13	1*	5	**3***	**8**	35	3928
3	Johnny Benson	2	6	28	10	4	27	5	4	29	9	1*	7	14	2	30	1*	1	8	2	3	9	3	27	7	1	3557
4	Todd Bodine	5	7	2	2	7	3	31	11	**1**	7	3	8	11	6	5	24	4	4	28	**1***	20	24	16	6	14	3525
5	Rick Crawford	10	9	4	3	2	10	23*	23	3	6	5	28	30	4	6	5	11	6	9	2	5	12	5	12	3	3523
6	Travis Kvapil	3*	16	15	14	13	13	7	3	6	**1**	8	1*	2	3*	1	11*	6	15	**1**	26	13	11	26	23	21	3511
7	Ted Musgrave	9	5	8	5	12	5	8	20	9	5	34		3	12	8	27	3	7	15	25	8	9	1	11	18	3183
8	Matt Crafton	8	11	3	17	10	7	35	26	7	34	9	10	16	14	11	12	9	11	26	18	18	7	7	14	12	3060
9	Jack Sprague	**1**	3	23	16	3	34	2	28	26	29	11	2	13	9	15	8	32	24	32	27	**2**	25	6	10	16	3001
10	David Starr	20	28	22	11	15	23	19	25	5	13	10	13	12	17	4	17	22	14	14	11	4	15	19	36	6	2921
11	Brendan Gaughan	21	21	6	25	11	35	9	36	24	3	28	22	22	10	12	2	10	25	30	16	11	8	2	13	19	2876
12	Erik Darnell	12	13	24	18	1*	30	15	18	32	26	6	9	29	7	9	13	7	2	5	29	25	26	14	35	24	2875
13	Dennis Setzer	19	19	7	13	26	22	1	19	16	24	19	19	18	13	26	26	19	30	7	5	10	13	15	9	29	2851
14	Terry Cook	27	30	17	15	9	16	12	8	12	11	13	29	31	26	18	32	30	18	4	28	29*	10	12	21	20	2568
15	Willie Allen **(R)**	29	22	13	22	18	21	28	14	28	22	31	23	15	29	29	19	12	28	23	6	14	20	11	17	28	2524
16	Tim Sauter **(R)**	28	26	21	29	30	17	20	17	14	23	16	11	26	18	21	28	31	23	20	21	27	21	10	24	11	2497
17	Mike Bliss	23	10	25	35		6		5			7		9	11	24	7	25	5		34	6		4	3*	32	2186
18	Chad McCumbee	13	27	18	24	27	18	14	13		19	23	26	20	34	32	35	15	26	10	24		27	13		22	2172
19	Ken Schrader	34	15	14	12		12	3	33	8	30	18	18	17	5	22	18	17	17								1913
20	Joey Clanton **(R)**	6		9	31		31	11		17			30	7		10	23	34			19	28	6	32		26	1670
21	Stacy Compton	17	12	16	21	14			2	10	12	12	24		22				22	8					32		1632
22	T. J. Bell			26	23	22	9	13	30	23	20							24	16	31	31		30	17	15	17	1569
23	Bill Lester	11	20	30	36	16	19	21	35	18	15	24	12	8	16	20											1550
24	Ryan Mathews							18	15	21	16	14	6	**4**	25	16	31	18	13				18				1494
25	Aaron Fike **(R)**	16	18	12	7	8	14	24	10	11	17	21	5														1487
26	Kyle Busch						11		12		2*						15		33		14	31	1*	29	1	2	1466
27	Jon Wood													6	28	7		14	9	3	10	16		8	20	**13**	1432
28	Jason White **(R)**	35				28	DNQ	26	22	22	27	26	31	23	32	27	34	23	27	27	35	DNQ	31	34	DNQ	DNQ	1404
29	Blake Bjorklund **(R)**	25	31	20	19	34	20	32	16	19	21	27	25	33	30	13											1355
30	Clay Rogers					21	33	16		25	25								12	11	15	26	34	33	16	27	1237
31	Kraig Kinser	30	17	29	30	24	29	33	31	15	14	17	14	28													1186
32	Regan Smith														8		14	5		12	9	36	18	30	34	9	1119
33	Josh Wise					17				13		29		21		19		8		6	23		35				962
34	A. J. Allmendinger	15	25	27	27		2		9		32						21		34								916
35	Scott Lynch					20			27			33			31			26	31	19		24	33	28	28	DNQ	893
36	Kevin Harvick		8		4		28				8														5	4	848
37	David Green													5	15	14	16	20	19	18							832
38	Mark Martin		23*				4		6		33						3						4				808
39	Chad Chaffin																		36	16	8	7	36	24	22	30	774
40	Brian Scott																		21	29		15	19	21	18	15	727
41	Jason Leffler																				4	23		9	4	5	707
42	Jacques Villeneuve																			21	30	32	14	25	19	36	615
43	Tyler Walker **(R)**	31	24	31	8	23	15																				585
44	Kelly Bires **(R)**	26	29	10	34	31		25				35															572
45	Cale Gale	14				32									24		9				22						514
46	Brandon Miller													19	23	25	22	27									467
47	Chase Miller	22	14	34	32	19																					452
48	Shane Sieg				DNQ												25		10		20		17				437
49	Kevin Hamlin **(R)**						25	10					21							17							434
50	Justin Marks																						22	23	25	8	421
51	Derrike Cope	33								31							29	29			12						413
52	J. C. Stout						26				31			24		31			29								392
53	Clint Bowyer			5					34										35			17					391
54	Bryan Silas					29	32				DNQ			25			30				32					DNQ	371
55	Peter Shepherd III **(R)**											32	15	32	21												352
56	Bradley Riethmeyer				DNQ			22					32		DNQ		20								26		352
57	Brad Keselowski			19	20								**16**														329
58	Kenny Hendrick					35								34	19	34											286
59	Shane Huffman						24		24			22															279
60	Aric Almirola												17			23			32								273
61	Travis Kittleson					36					28					36							28	36			268
62	Chris Jones				DNQ																	21			27	31	252
63	Jack Smith							27				25		27				36									252
64	Carl Edwards	24	**4**																								251
65	Danny O'Quinn Jr.															17	10										246
66	Kelly Sutton					33		DNQ		33		20															231
67	Andy Lally																							22	31	23	231
68	Wayne Edwards	DNQ	33	32									36	35		28					36		29	DNQ			222
69	J. R. Norris																	16						20			218
70	Brett Thompson														33					25					33		216
71	Chris Fontaine							17					20														215
72	Justin Labonte														27							12					209
73	Morgan Shepherd		34	33					29																		201
74	Timothy Peters				9												36										193
75	Donny Lia																		20							25	191
76	Travis Dassow																					22			29		173
77	Joe Ruttman					25				27						33		35				DNQ					170
78	Mike Wallace	36																			17						167
79	Frank Kreyer				28			34																			140
80	Dave Blaney																									10	139
81	Andrew Myers																								30	34	134
82	Dana White								32				34					33		33							131
83	Kenny Wallace																	13									124
84	Ken Butler III							36					33														119
85	Benny Gordon											15															118
86	Brandon Knupp	18								34				36		35											109
87	Bobby Labonte										18																109
88	Denny Hamlin																					19					106
89	Eric Norris									20																	103
90	Scott Lagasse Jr.								21																		100
91	Boris Jurkovic																	21									100
92	Brandon Whitt																						23				94
93	Buddy Lazier																			24							91
94	Jimmy Simpson				26																						85
95	Keven Wood												27														82
96	Daniel Pope							29																			76
97	Tim Cowen				DNQ			30														DNQ					73
98	Chris Wimmer									30										36							73
99	Brad Mueller											30															73
100	Peyton Sellers																							31			70
101	Larry Foyt	32																									67
102	Casey Kingsland **(R)**		32																	QL							67
103	Patrick Sheltra																						32				67
104	Paul Menard				33																						64
105	Nate Monteith																33										64
106	Marc Mitchell																				33						64
107	Dario Franchitti																					33					64
108	Johnny Chapman			35																34							61
109	Colin Braun																					34					61
110	Boston Reid										35																58
111	Tim Schendel														35										DNQ	DNQ	58
112	Hermie Sadler																					35					58
113	Kevin Lepage										36													35		DNQ	55
114	Justin Hobgood						36																				55
115	Pierre Bourque														36												
116	Scott Wimmer																									23	
117	Michael McDowell																					30					
118	Bobby Dotter												35							35							
119	Blake Mallory									35																	
120	Randy MacDonald											36															
121	Brian Sockwell **(R)**				DNQ												DNQ										
122	Sean Caisse																		DNQ								
123	Davin Scites																					DNQ					
124	Cory Collum																					DNQ					
125	John Coffman																					DNQ					
Pos	Driver	DAY	CAL	ATL	MAR	KAN	CLT	MFD	DOV	TEX	MCH	MIL	MEM	KEN	IRP	NSH	BRI	GTW	NHA	LVS	TAL	MAR	ATL	TEX	PHO	HOM	Points

== Rookies ==
As noted above, the two main contenders for ROTY, Aaron Fike and Tyler Walker, were both suspended by NASCAR for violating its drug abuse policy. The two main contenders for the title would then be ex-Busch Series driver Tim Sauter and sprint car driver Willie Allen. The fight would come down to the final race, where Allen would prevail by nine points over Sauter. Although Joey Clanton was in contention for the rookie title, he was running only a partial season in the No. 09. Other contenders, such as Jason White, Ryan Mathews, and Blake Bjorklund also ran partial seasons.

== See also ==
- 2007 NASCAR Nextel Cup Series
- 2007 NASCAR Busch Series
- 2007 NASCAR Busch East Series
- 2007 ARCA Re/Max Series
- 2007 NASCAR Whelen Modified Tour
- 2007 NASCAR Whelen Southern Modified Tour
- 2007 NASCAR Canadian Tire Series
- 2007 NASCAR Corona Series
