= Casey Kingsland =

American racing driver

- Born: December 14, 1984 (age 41); Las Vegas, Nevada, U.S.

NASCAR FedEx Freight Truck Series career
- 4 races run over 5 years
- 2007 position: 102nd
- Best finish: 70th (2006)
- First race: 2005 Kroger 250 (Martinsville)
- Last race: 2007 San Bernardino County 200 (Auto Club)
Wins	Top tens	Poles
0	0	0
- Statistics up to date as of September 7, 2019.

Casey Kingsland (born December 14, 1984) is an American professional stock car racing driver. The Las Vegas native has competed in four NASCAR Craftsman Truck Series races, one for Mighty Motorsports and three for Pennington Motorsports.

== Racing career ==
Growing up as a native of Las Vegas, Nevada, Kingsland raced the Las Vegas Motor Speedway Bullring, winning the track's Mini Cup division championship in 2000 at age 15. He also raced late models and super trucks at the track before breaking on to the national scene.

For the 2003 NASCAR Craftsman Truck Series season, Kingsland and MLB Motorsports announced a five-race schedule for Kingsland in the No. 66 Dodge. The schedule included Kingsland's home track, Las Vegas Motor Speedway. Kingsland hoped the limited schedule in 2003 would turn into a full-time schedule with the team in 2004. He failed to qualify in his debut attempt at Lucas Oil Raceway in an eventful weekend that started with the team's truck having to be assembled at the track. After the race, Kingsland and MLB convinced NASCAR to jump normal approval protocol and let Kingsland attempt a race at Bristol Motor Speedway with no prior NASCAR experience. The move was made in order to keep with normal approval protocol for other scheduled races at Richmond International Raceway and LVMS. Kingsland left MLB before the attempt, and the team closed soon afterward. Kingsland hoped to race Martinsville Speedway, Phoenix International Raceway and Homestead-Miami Speedway to close out the 2003 season in an attempt to gain approval for the 2004 season-opening race at Daytona International Speedway, though no attempts were ever made.

In 2004, Kingsland signed with startup team DCCS Motorsports, with funding from Langers Juices. Kingsland's first two attempts would come at Lucas Oil and Bristol, and if those went well, Kingsland would run Las Vegas and other races, but still keep his rookies status and make a run for Rookie of the Year in 2005. After not being able to make a qualifying attempt in his first race due to an incomplete truck and being notified that a truck would not be ready for his second attempt, Kingsland left the team.

Kingsland finally made his Truck debut in 2005, running with Mighty Motorsports at Martinsville Speedway in spring. After being involved in multiple on-track incidents, officials parked Kingsland's No. 24 truck just short of halfway through the race for failing to maintain minimum speed. Later in the year, he ran with TommyRaz Motorsports to raise awareness of missing children, though the team failed to qualify at Lucas Oil and Bristol.

The following year, Kingsland moved to North Carolina from Las Vegas and made two starts with Pennington Motorsports, enjoying the stability that an established team brought. Building on that, Kingsland declared for Rookie of the Year in 2007 and made his debut in the San Bernardino County 200, since he wasn't approved to run the season-opening race at Daytona. After finishing 32nd after a crash, Kingsland was made a test driver for the team and was replaced by Brad Keselowski for the next race. Jason White later became Pennington's full-time driver, ending Kingsland's tenure with the team.

Going back to local racing, Kingsland drove late models at the Bullring in 2010 but was sidelined after the season due to health issues.

== Personal life ==
Kingsland graduated from Eldorado High School.

== Motorsports career results ==
=== NASCAR ===
==== Craftsman Truck Series ====
NASCAR Craftsman Truck Series results
Year	Team	No.	Make	1	2	3	4	5	6	7	8	9	10	11	12	13	14	15	16	17	18	19	20	21	22	23	24	25	NCTC	Pts	Ref
2003	MLB Motorsports	66	Dodge	DAY	DAR	MMR	MAR	CLT	DOV	TEX	MEM	MLW	KAN	KEN	GTW	MCH	IRP; DNQ	NSH	BRI	RCH	NHA	CAL	LVS	SBO	TEX	MAR	PHO	HOM	N/A	0	
2004	DCCS Motorsports	55	Dodge	DAY	ATL	MAR	MFD	CLT	DOV	TEX	MEM	MLW	KAN	KEN	GTW	MCH	IRP; DNQ	NSH	BRI	RCH	NHA	LVS	CAL	TEX	MAR	PHO	DAR	HOM	N/A	0	
2005	Mighty Motorsports	24	Dodge	DAY	CAL	ATL	MAR; 36	GTY	MFD	CLT	DOV	TEX	MCH	MLW	KAN	KEN	MEM												92nd	55	
2005	TommyRaz Motorsports	91	Dodge															IRP; DNQ	NSH	BRI; DNQ	RCH	NHA	LVS	MAR	ATL	TEX	PHO	HOM	92nd	55	
2006	Pennington Motorsports	7	Chevy	DAY	CAL	ATL	MAR	GTY	CLT	MFD	DOV	TEX	MCH	MLW	KAN	KEN	MEM	IRP	NSH	BRI	NHA	LVS	TAL	MAR; DNQ	ATL	TEX	PHO; 31	HOM; 28	70th	149	
2007	Pennington Motorsports	7	Chevy	DAY	CAL; 32	ATL	MAR	KAN	CLT	MFD	DOV	TEX	MCH	MLW	MEM	KEN	IRP	NSH	BRI	GTW	NHA								102nd	67	
2007	Green Light Racing	06	Chevy																			LVS; QL^{†}	TAL	MAR	ATL	TEX	PHO	HOM	102nd	67	
^{†} – Qualified but replaced by Bobby Dotter
