= Kevin Hamlin =

American racing driver

- Hamlin at Nashville in 2007
- Born: June 22, 1979 (age 47); Snohomish, Washington, U.S.

NASCAR O'Reilly Auto Parts Series career
- 43 races run over 6 years
- 2010 position: 95th
- Best finish: 45th (2005)
- First race: 2005 ITT Industries & Goulds Pumps Salute to the Troops 250 (Pikes Peak)
- Last race: 2010 5-Hour Energy 250 (Gateway)
Wins	Top tens	Poles
0	2	0

NASCAR FedEx Freight Truck Series career
- 6 races run over 3 years
- 2007 position: 49th
- Best finish: 49th (2007)
- First race: 2005 O'Reilly Auto Parts 250 (Kansas)
- Last race: 2007 Smith's Las Vegas 350 (Las Vegas)
Wins	Top tens	Poles
0	1	0
- Statistics up to date as of October 1, 2013.

Kevin Hamlin (born June 22, 1979) is an American professional stock car racing driver who has competed in the NASCAR Nationwide Series and NASCAR Camping World Truck Series divisions. He currently is a spotter for Alex Bowman in the NASCAR Cup Series and Cleetus McFarland in the ARCA Menards Series.

Starting at Pikes Peak in 2005, he piloted the No. 4 GEICO Dodge for the Biagi Brothers Racing team in the Busch Series, scoring several top fifteen finishes, and was rumored to be in the car full-time for the 2006 season, but was released in late November 2005, replaced by Mark Green when team owner Fred Biagi declined to renew his relationship with Chip Ganassi Racing.

He is not related to former Richard Childress Racing crew chief Kevin Hamlin or current NASCAR driver Denny Hamlin.

== Racing career ==
Hamlin's driving career starting in the Pacific Northwest at the age of three, racing dirt ovals on a 50cc 3-wheeler. By the age of six, he had moved up to Quarter midgets where he won eight regional and one national championship. At the age of fourteen, his family purchased a late model to pursue Kevin's career. In 1996, Hamlin began racing at the Super Stock division at Evergreen Speedway becoming the youngest winner in the division capturing three feature victories in 1997.

In 1998, Hamlin moved up to the NASCAR Northwest Series, where in 103 career starts he captured eleven wins, 41 top-five and 62 top-ten finishes. He was also crowned the 2001 and 2002 Northwest Series Champion and also was named the 2001 and 2003 Most Popular Driver. Hamlin owns NASCAR Northwest Series records for the youngest ever race winner at nineteen years and eleven months, the youngest ever champion at 21 years and six months and most consecutive laps led at 275 spanning over three races.

In 2006, Hamlin ran Daytona in the Craftsman Truck Series driving the No. 04 Dodge Hemi Dodge for Bobby Hamilton Racing. He also drove the No. 4 Biagi Brothers Racing Dodge in the Daytona Winn-Dixie 250, due to Biagi's driver Auggie Vidovich not having superspeedway clearance. Hamlin also practiced and qualified the No. 41 Ganassi Busch car for several races that Sorenson could not attend due to schedule conflicts with the Cup Series events. During the year, he filled in for teammate Reed Sorenson in five non-companion Nextel Cup/Busch Series events, practicing and qualifying Sorenson's No. 41 Busch car which resulted in two top-five finishes and three top-ten finishes for Sorenson.

In early 2007, it was announced that Hamlin and Nextel Cup rookie Juan Pablo Montoya would split time driving the No. 42 Texaco Havoline Dodge for Ganassi in the Busch Series. During the Gateway 250, Hamlin earned his first career top-ten finish, a sixth, despite a spin caused by Carl Edwards near the later stages of the race. The next week he followed up with a solid eighth place finish at the Kroger 200 at O'Reilly Raceway Park at Indianapolis. It was announced later the next week that the No. 42 Busch team would be shutting down, effectively ending Hamlin's season. However, Ganassi said that he would keep Hamlin in the car for the following two races at Michigan and Bristol, but the week after the Michigan race, David Stremme was slated to drive the car at Bristol due to a last minute sponsor change.

Hamlin ran three Nationwide races in 2008 for Pat MacDonald. He finished 24th at Fontana, 21st in Dover, and crashed at Memphis.

In 2009, Hamlin ran a limited Nationwide schedule for a number of teams. At Kentucky, he led two laps while driving for Jay Robinson. Hamlin, normally a spotter for John Andretti, failed to qualify for the Kansas Sprint Cup race for Front Row Motorsports.

Starting at Texas in the Fall of 2010 and through the 2011 season, Kevin was the spotter for NASCAR Sprint Cup driver Clint Bowyer. He started 2012 as the spotter for Ty Dillon in the Camping World Truck Series and occasionally for Brendan Gaughan in the Nationwide series. In July 2012, he became the full-time spotter for Kasey Kahne.

Hamlin was a spotter for Change Racing in the 2016 and 2017 24 Hours of Daytona.

Hamlin would move to the No. 88 team in 2018, spotting for Alex Bowman.

== Motorsports career results ==
=== NASCAR ===
(key) (Bold – Pole position awarded by qualifying time. Italics – Pole position earned by points standings or practice time. * – Most laps led.)

==== Sprint Cup Series ====
NASCAR Sprint Cup Series results
Year	Team	No.	Make	1	2	3	4	5	6	7	8	9	10	11	12	13	14	15	16	17	18	19	20	21	22	23	24	25	26	27	28	29	30	31	32	33	34	35	36	NSCC	Pts	Ref
2009	Front Row Motorsports	37	Dodge	DAY	CAL	LVS	ATL	BRI	MAR	TEX	PHO	TAL	RCH	DAR	CLT	DOV	POC	MCH	SON	NHA	DAY	CHI	IND	POC	GLN	MCH	BRI	ATL	RCH	NHA	DOV	KAN; DNQ	CAL	CLT	MAR	TAL	TEX	PHO	HOM	NA	-	

==== Nationwide Series ====
NASCAR Nationwide Series results
Year	Team	No.	Make	1	2	3	4	5	6	7	8	9	10	11	12	13	14	15	16	17	18	19	20	21	22	23	24	25	26	27	28	29	30	31	32	33	34	35	NNSC	Pts	Ref
2005	Biagi Brothers Racing	4	Dodge	DAY	CAL	MXC	LVS	ATL	NSH	BRI	TEX	PHO	TAL	DAR	RCH	CLT	DOV	NSH	KEN	MLW	DAY	CHI	NHA	PPR; 17	GTY; 23	IRP; 26	GLN	MCH; 31	BRI; 22	CAL; 42	RCH; 20	DOV; 34	KAN; 31	CLT; 15	MEM; 14	TEX; 28	PHO; 23	HOM; 35	45th	1204	
2006	Biagi Brothers Racing	4	Dodge	DAY	CAL	MXC	LVS	ATL	BRI	TEX	NSH	PHO	TAL	RCH	DAR	CLT	DOV	NSH	KEN	MLW	DAY; 27	CHI	NHA																120th	82	
2006	Chip Ganassi Racing	41	Dodge																					MAR; QL^{†}											MEM; QL^{†}	TEX	PHO	HOM	120th	82	
2006	FitzBradshaw Racing	12	Dodge																						GTY; DNQ	IRP	GLN	MCH	BRI	CAL	RCH	DOV	KAN	CLT					120th	82	
2007	Chip Ganassi Racing	42	Dodge	DAY	CAL	MXC	LVS	ATL	BRI	NSH; 18	TEX	PHO	TAL	RCH	DAR	CLT	DOV	NSH; 23	KEN; 21	MLW; 16	NHA	DAY	CHI	GTY; 7	IRP; 8	CGV	GLN	MCH; 42	BRI	CAL	RCH	DOV	KAN	CLT	MEM	TEX	PHO	HOM	54th	748	
2008	MacDonald Motorsports	81	Dodge	DAY	CAL	LVS	ATL	BRI	NSH	TEX	PHO	MXC	TAL	RCH	DAR	CLT	DOV	NSH	KEN	MLW	NHA	DAY	CHI	GTY	IRP	CGV	GLN	MCH	BRI	CAL; 24	RCH	DOV; 21	KAN	CLT					83rd	249	
2008	Chip Ganassi Racing	40	Dodge																																MEM; 35	TEX	PHO	HOM	83rd	249	
2009	MacDonald Motorsports	81	Dodge	DAY	CAL	LVS	BRI; 33	TEX; 31	NSH					DAR; 26	CLT; 35	DOV	NSH																	CLT; 36	MEM	TEX			70th	589	
2009	Means Racing	52	Chevy							PHO; 41	TAL										CHI; DNQ											KAN; DNQ							70th	589	
2009	Means Racing	52	Ford									RCH; DNQ																											70th	589	
2009	Jay Robinson Racing	49	Chevy														KEN; 36	MLW	NHA	DAY																			70th	589	
2009	Smith-Ganassi Racing	42	Dodge																			GTY; 43	IRP																70th	589	
2009	Front Row Motorsports	34	Chevy																					IOW; QL^{‡}	GLN														70th	589	
2009	Rick Ware Racing	31	Chevy																							MCH; 41	BRI	CGV	ATL	RCH									70th	589	
2009	Rick Ware Racing	41	Chevy																												DOV; 43		CAL; 38						70th	589	
2009	Baker-Curb Racing	37	Ford																																		PHO; 37	HOM; 43	70th	589	
2010	Means Racing	52	Chevy	DAY	CAL	LVS	BRI	NSH	PHO	TEX	TAL	RCH	DAR	DOV; 41	CLT	NSH	KEN	ROA	NHA	DAY																			95th	183	
2010	TriStar Motorsports	36	Chevy																		CHI; DNQ	GTY			GLN; 42	MCH	BRI	CGV							GTY; 43	TEX	PHO	HOM	95th	183	
2010	RAB Racing	09	Ford																				IRP; 27	IOW															95th	183	
2010	Baker-Curb Racing	43	Ford																										ATL; 42	RCH	DOV	KAN	CAL	CLT					95th	183	
^{†} - Qualified for Reed Sorenson · ^{‡} - Qualified for Tony Raines

==== Craftsman Truck Series ====
NASCAR Craftsman Truck Series results
Year	Team	No.	Make	1	2	3	4	5	6	7	8	9	10	11	12	13	14	15	16	17	18	19	20	21	22	23	24	25	NCTC	Pts	Ref
2005	Green Light Racing	07	Chevy	DAY	CAL	ATL	MAR	GTY	MFD	CLT	DOV	TEX	MCH	MLW	KAN; 23	KEN	MEM	IRP	NSH	BRI	RCH	NHA	LVS	MAR	ATL	TEX	PHO	HOM	80th	94	
2006	Bobby Hamilton Racing	04	Dodge	DAY; 11	CAL	ATL	MAR	GTY	CLT	MFD	DOV	TEX	MCH	MLW	KAN	KEN	MEM	IRP	NSH	BRI	NHA	LVS	TAL	MAR	ATL	TEX	PHO	HOM	72nd	135	
2007	Bobby Hamilton Racing	4	Dodge	DAY	CAL	ATL	MAR	KAN	CLT; 25	MFD; 10	DOV	TEX	MCH	MLW	MEM; 21	KEN	IRP	NSH	BRI	GTW	NHA	LVS; 17	TAL	MAR	ATL	TEX	PHO	HOM	49th	434	

=== ARCA Re/Max Series ===
(key) (Bold – Pole position awarded by qualifying time. Italics – Pole position earned by points standings or practice time. * – Most laps led.)

ARCA Re/Max Series results
Year	Team	No.	Make	1	2	3	4	5	6	7	8	9	10	11	12	13	14	15	16	17	18	19	20	21	22	23	ARMC	Pts	Ref
2005	Ken Schrader Racing	99	Dodge	DAY	NSH	SLM	KEN; 5	TOL	LAN	MIL	POC	MCH; 8	KAN	KEN	BLN	POC	GTW	LER	NSH	MCH	ISF	TOL	DSF	CHI	SLM	TAL	70th	400	
