= Bradley Riethmeyer =

American racing driver (born 1984)

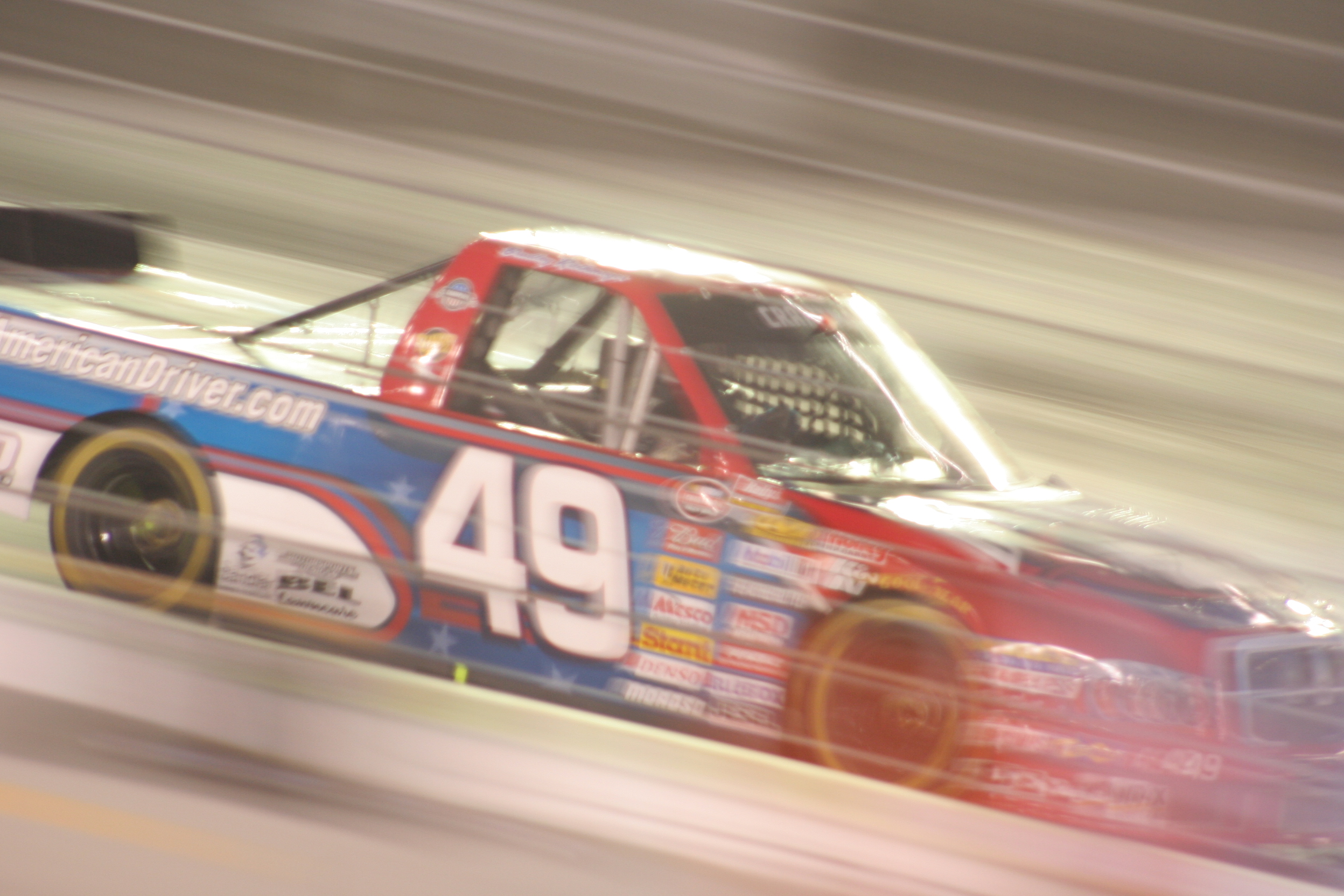
- Reithmeyer's No. 49 truck at Bristol Motor Speedway in 2007
- Born: January 14, 1984 (age 42) Hutto, Texas, U.S.

ARCA Racing Series career
- Debut season: 2008
- Former teams: Win-Tron Racing
- Starts: 3
- Wins: 0
- Poles: 0
- Best finish: 105th in 2008
- Finished last season: 144th (2012)

Previous series
- 2004 2008 2018: NASCAR Southeast Series; X-1R Pro Cup Series; CARS Super Late Model Tour

NASCAR FedEx Freight Truck Series career
- 6 races run over 4 years
- 2013 position: 80th
- Best finish: 56th (2007)
- First race: 2007 Ohio 250 (Mansfield)
- Last race: 2013 Kroger 200 (Martinsville)
| Wins | Top tens | Poles |
|---|---|---|
| 0 | 0 | 0 |
- Statistics up to date as of March 24, 2020.

Bradley "Brad" Riethmeyer (born January 14, 1984) is an American former professional stock car racing driver. He has raced in the United States Auto Club (USAC), NASCAR Camping World Truck Series, and the ARCA Racing Series.

== Racing career ==
Riethmeyer began racing in quarter midgets at the age of nine, eventually working his way into super late models owned by his family, including winning the 2003 ROMCO SLM Series Rookie of the Year honors followed by the series championship in 2004, though financial issues threatened to end his operations. In 2005, he entered the All-American Driver Challenge contest with the winner receiving a USAC midget ride from Tracy Trotter. Riethmeyer ultimately won the challenge after defeating the other finalists at Hickory Motor Speedway in March 2006, which allowed him to start competing in the United States Auto Club (USAC) Midget Series. Midget chassis builder and challenge judge Bob East described Riethmeyer as "an extraordinary amount of talent for never stepping foot (sic) in an open-wheel car before."

During his first year in the USAC Midgets, Riethmeyer battled with Chase Scott for the championship. In 2008, he won the USAC Carolina Ford Focus Midget Series title. During his title run, he joined Win-Tron Racing for his maiden ARCA Re/Max Series start at the Illinois State Fairgrounds.

Riethmeyer attempted to make his Truck Series debut in 2006 at Martinsville Speedway for Robert Richardson Racing in an alliance with the All-American Driver Challenge, but failed to qualify. The following season saw his first Truck start at Mansfield Motorsports Park, where he finished 22nd. He joined Reary Racing for the Gateway Motorsports Park race in 2008, finishing 31st with radiator issues. He would not return to the series until 2013 for MAKE Motorsports and Mike Harmon Racing at Martinsville. He exited the race on lap 52 with clutch problems and was classified in 34th.

== Personal life ==
Riethmeyer is an alumnus of Texas A&M University.

== Motorsports career results ==
=== NASCAR ===
(key) (Bold – Pole position awarded by qualifying time. Italics – Pole position earned by points standings or practice time. * – Most laps led.)

==== Camping World Truck Series ====
NASCAR Camping World Truck Series results
| Year | Team | No. | Make | 1 | 2 | 3 | 4 | 5 | 6 | 7 | 8 | 9 | 10 | 11 | 12 | 13 | 14 | 15 | 16 | 17 | 18 | 19 | 20 | 21 | 22 | 23 | 24 | 25 | NCWTC | Pts | Ref |
|---|---|---|---|---|---|---|---|---|---|---|---|---|---|---|---|---|---|---|---|---|---|---|---|---|---|---|---|---|---|---|---|
| 2006 | Trotter Racing | 49 | Dodge | DAY | CAL | ATL | MAR | GTY | CLT | MFD | DOV | TEX | MCH | MLW | KAN | KEN | MEM | IRP | NSH | BRI | NHA | LVS | TAL | MAR; DNQ | ATL | TEX | PHO | HOM | N/A | 0 | |
| 2007 | Trotter Racing | 49 | Dodge | DAY | CAL | ATL | MAR; DNQ | KAN | CLT | MFD; 22 | DOV | TEX | MCH | MLW | | | | | BRI; 20 | GTW | NHA | LVS | TAL | MAR | ATL | TEX | PHO; 26 | HOM | 56th | 352 | |
| 2007 | Blankenbaker Motorsports | 53 | Dodge | | | | | | | | | | | | MEM; 32 | KEN | IRP; DNQ | NSH | | | | | | | | | | | 56th | 352 | |
| 2008 | Reary Racing | 54 | Chevy | DAY | CAL | ATL | MAR | KAN | CLT | MFD | DOV | TEX | MCH | MLW | MEM | KEN | IRP | NSH | BRI | GTW; 31 | NHA | LVS | TAL | MAR | ATL | TEX | PHO | HOM | 101st | 70 | |
| 2013 | MAKE Motorsports | 84 | Chevy | DAY | MAR | CAR | KAN | CLT | DOV | TEX | KEN | IOW | ELD | POC | MCH | BRI | MSP | IOW | CHI | LVS | TAL | MAR; 34 | TEX | PHO | | | | | 80th | 10 | |
| 2013 | MAKE Motorsports | 50 | Chevy | | | | | | | | | | | | | | | | | | | | | | HOM; DNQ | | | | 80th | 10 | |

^{*} Season still in progress
^{1} Ineligible for series points

=== ARCA Racing Series ===
(key) (Bold – Pole position awarded by qualifying time. Italics – Pole position earned by points standings or practice time. * – Most laps led.)

ARCA Racing Series results
| Year | Team | No. | Make | 1 | 2 | 3 | 4 | 5 | 6 | 7 | 8 | 9 | 10 | 11 | 12 | 13 | 14 | 15 | 16 | 17 | 18 | 19 | 20 | 21 | ARSC | Pts | Ref |
|---|---|---|---|---|---|---|---|---|---|---|---|---|---|---|---|---|---|---|---|---|---|---|---|---|---|---|---|
| 2008 | Win-Tron Racing | 32 | Dodge | DAY | SLM | IOW | KEN | CAR | KEN | TOL | POC | MCH | CAY | KEN | BLN | POC | NSH | ISF; 11 | DSF | CHI | SLM | NJE | TAL | TOL | 105th | 175 | |
| 2009 | Win-Tron Racing | 32 | Toyota | DAY | SLM | CAR | TAL | KEN | TOL | POC | MCH | MFD | IOW | KEN; 31 | BLN | POC | ISF | CHI | TOL | DSF | NJE | SLM | KAN | CAR | 148th | 80 | |
| 2012 | Win-Tron Racing | 32 | Chevy | DAY | MOB | SLM | TAL | TOL | ELK | POC | MCH | WIN | NJE | IOW | CHI; 34 | IRP | POC | BLN | ISF | MAD | SLM | DSF | KAN | | 144th | 60 | |

=== CARS Super Late Model Tour ===
(key)

CARS Super Late Model Tour results
| Year | Team | No. | Make | 1 | 2 | 3 | 4 | 5 | 6 | 7 | 8 | 9 | CSLMTC | Pts | Ref |
|---|---|---|---|---|---|---|---|---|---|---|---|---|---|---|---|
| 2018 | Keith Riethmeyer | 2R | Chevy | MYB | NSH | ROU | HCY; 18 | BRI | AND | HCY | ROU | SBO | 48th | 15 | |
