= Jack Smith (American racing driver, born 1973) =

American racing driver

- Born: March 18, 1973 (age 53); Medina, Ohio, U.S.

NASCAR FedEx Freight Truck Series career
- 17 races run over 4 years
- 2011 position: 36th
- Best finish: 36th (2011)
- First race: 2007 City of Mansfield 250 (Mansfield)
- Last race: 2011 WinStar World Casino 350K (Texas)
Wins	Top tens	Poles
0	0	0

Jack Smith (born March 18, 1973) is an American former professional stock car racing driver. He last competed part-time in the NASCAR Camping World Truck Series, driving the No. 63 for MB Motorsports. Smith has been under an indefinite suspension from NASCAR since November 2011, for violation of the sport's Substance Abuse Policy. Smith was previously suspended in 2010 after attempting to purchase a controlled substance.
