= Joey Clanton =

American stock car racing driver

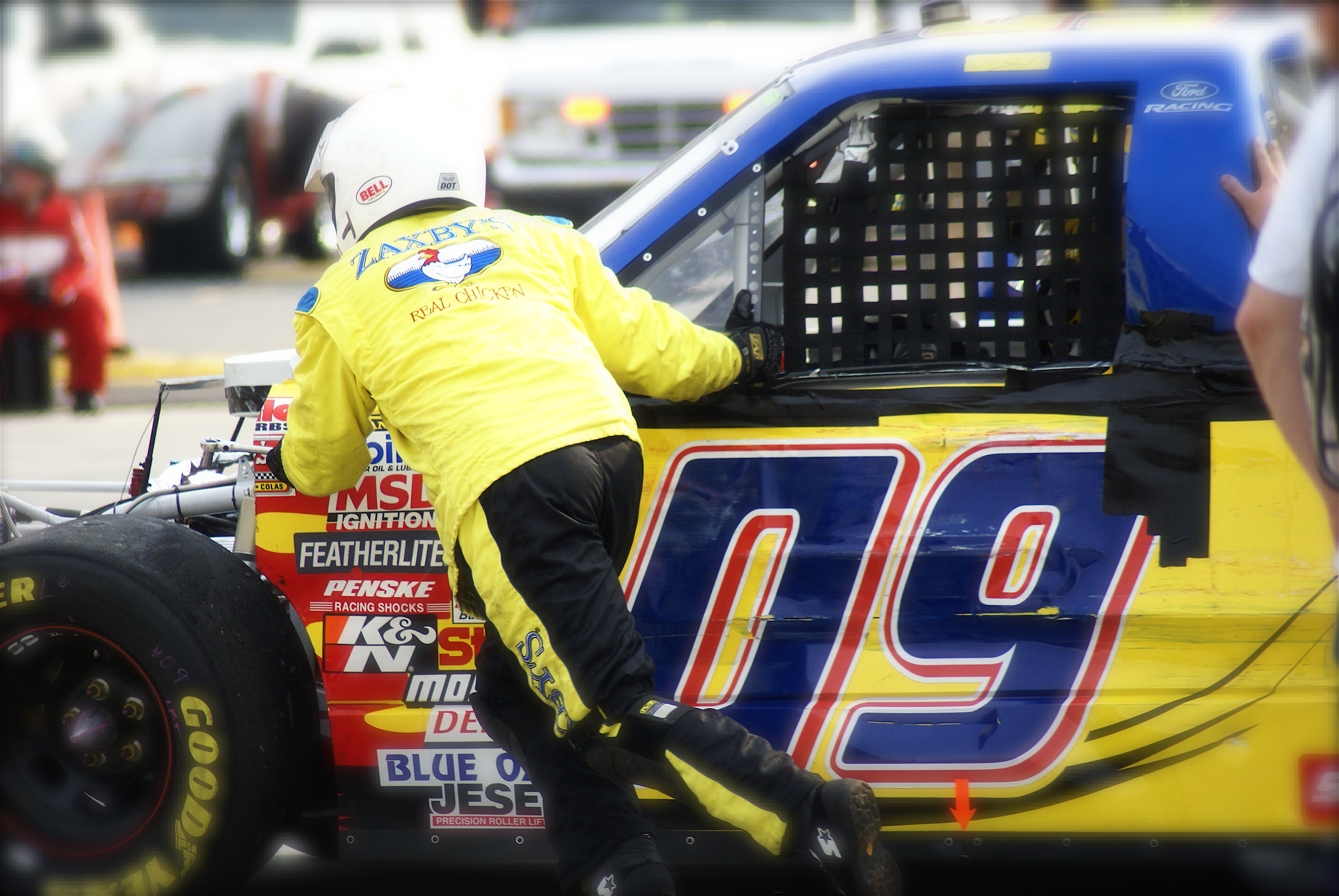
- Clanton's truck after a wreck at Martinsville in 2007.
- Born: Joseph Clanton; November 1, 1972 (age 54); Stockbridge, Georgia, U.S.
- Achievements: 2002 American Speed Association Champion

NASCAR O'Reilly Auto Parts Series career
- 18 races run over 1 year
- Best finish: 30th (2003)
- First race: 2003 Hardee's 250 (Richmond)
- Last race: 2003 Stacker 200 (Dover)
Wins	Top tens	Poles
0	1	0

NASCAR FedEx Freight Truck Series career
- 19 races run over 3 years
- Best finish: 20th (2007)
- First race: 2004 Florida Dodge Dealers 250 (Daytona)
- Last race: 2008 Chevy Silverado HD 250 (Daytona)
Wins	Top tens	Poles
0	5	0
- Statistics up to date as of February 10, 2012.

Joseph Clanton (born November 1, 1972) is an American race car driver and businessman. He was the 2002 champion in the now-defunct American Speed Association stock car series. He is also the owner of two Zaxby's franchises.

== Busch Series ==
Clanton made his debut in the then-NASCAR Busch Series in the 2003 Hardee's 250 at Richmond International Raceway. Driving the No. 27 Trim Spa Pontiac for Brewco Motorsports, he started and finished 22nd. Clanton would drive in seventeen more races and earn one top-ten finish, a career-best fifth at Pikes Peak. After the Stacker 200 Presented by YJ Stinger, Clanton was replaced in the car by Chase Montgomery, whom he had replaced earlier in the season. He has not returned to the series since then.

== Craftsman Truck Series ==
In 2004, Clanton made his debut in the NASCAR Craftsman Truck Series, driving the No. 40 Chevrolet for Key Motorsports. In his first race at Daytona International Speedway, he crashed and finished 32nd. He also crashed the next race, finishing 31st at Atlanta. Clanton would not return to the series until 2007, when he brought Zaxby's sponsorship to the No. 09 Ford of JTG Racing. Sharing the ride with Stacy Compton, he ran in 16 of the 25 series events and earned five top-tens, including a career best of sixth at both Daytona and Atlanta.

During the offseason, it was announced that Clanton would take the sponsorship and number and run full-time for Roush Fenway Racing in 2008. After wrecking himself and teammate Colin Braun in offseason testing and then crashing out of the season-opening race at Daytona, he was released and replaced by Travis Kvapil effective immediately.

== Motorsports career results ==
=== NASCAR ===
(key) (Bold – Pole position awarded by qualifying time. Italics – Pole position earned by points standings or practice time. * – Most laps led.)

==== Busch Series ====
NASCAR Busch Series results
Year	Team	No.	Make	1	2	3	4	5	6	7	8	9	10	11	12	13	14	15	16	17	18	19	20	21	22	23	24	25	26	27	28	29	30	31	32	33	34	NBSC	Pts	Ref
2003	Brewco Motorsports	27	Pontiac	DAY	CAR	LVS	DAR	BRI	TEX	TAL	NSH	CAL	RCH; 22		NZH; 18	CLT; 26		NSH; 27	KEN; 16	MLW; 20	DAY; 11	CHI; 14	NHA; 27	PPR; 5	IRP; 41	MCH; 24	BRI; 31	DAR; 22	RCH; 37	DOV; 27	KAN	CLT	MEM	ATL	PHO	CAR	HOM	30th	1716	
2003	Brewco Motorsports	27	Chevy											GTY; 15			DOV; 27																					30th	1716	

==== Craftsman Truck Series ====
NASCAR Craftsman Truck Series results
Year	Team	No.	Make	1	2	3	4	5	6	7	8	9	10	11	12	13	14	15	16	17	18	19	20	21	22	23	24	25	NCTC	Pts	Ref
2004	Key Motorsports	40	Chevy	DAY; 32	ATL; 31	MAR	MFD	CLT	DOV	TEX	MEM	MLW	KAN	KEN	GTW	MCH	IRP	NSH	BRI	RCH	NHA	LVS	CAL	TEX	MAR	PHO	DAR	HOM	79th	137	
2007	JTG Racing	09	Ford	DAY; 6	CAL	ATL; 9	MAR; 31	KAN	CLT; 31	MFD; 11	DOV	TEX; 17	MCH	MLW	MEM; 30	KEN; 7	IRP	NSH; 10	BRI; 23	GTW; 34	NHA	LVS	TAL; 19	MAR; 28	ATL; 6	TEX; 32	PHO	HOM; 26	20th	1670	
2008	Roush Fenway Racing	09	Ford	DAY; 32	CAL	ATL	MAR	KAN	CLT	MFD	DOV	TEX	MCH	MLW	MEM	KEN	IRP	NSH	BRI	GTW	NHA	LVS	TAL	MAR	ATL	TEX	PHO	HOM	102nd	67	

Sporting positions
Preceded by Johnny Sauter	ASA National Tour Champion; 2002	Succeeded by Kevin Cywinski
