= MRD Motorsports =

NASCAR team

- Owner: Dave Malcolmson
- Series: Truck Series
- Closed: 2009

MRD Motorsports is an American NASCAR team. The team is owned by Dave Malcolmson but has been inactive as of 2009.

Malcolmson originally started the team in the Allison Legacy Series as a driver before retiring as an owner. Malcolmson would debut his team in the Goody's Dash Series before moving up to the Truck Series in 2003. The team would field the No. 06 for Regan Smith in 2004 and 2005, with his best finish being 9th at Homestead-Miami Speedway. Smith would leave the team for the Busch Series, and Malcolmson tapped ARCA RE/MAX Series driver Chad McCumbee for the 2006 season. McCumbee and MRD struggled, missing the season opening GM Flex Fuel 250. After a few races, McCumbee left the team for Green Light Racing. The operation would run out of money after Dover. Malcolmson would revive the team for the 2007 season in a partnership with Nextel Cup Series team Haas CNC Racing. MRD fielded another ARCA driver, this time for Rookie of the Year Blake Bjorklund in 12 races because of a driver development partnership with Haas CNC Racing. However, owner Gene Haas decided to move Bjorklund up to the Busch Series to pilot Jay Robinson Racing's No. 28. Chad McCumbee would return to MRD after struggling with Green Light Racing, taking his sponsors The GPS Store and Garmin with him. His best finish with MRD was a 10th place at Las Vegas Motor Speedway. McCumbee took the team to a near upset victory at Texas before spinning his tires which led to being spun on a green-white-checkered finish and finishing 13th.

For 2009, MRD cut back to a partial schedule with Dennis Setzer driving starting at Atlanta. The team grabbed a few top tens and was sitting in the top 10 in points when was forced to miss six races due to sponsorship issues. Todd Kluever drove for the team at Gateway, but nothing has been heard of the team since.

== Truck No. 8 results ==
Year	Driver	No.	Make	1	2	3	4	5	6	7	8	9	10	11	12	13	14	15	16	17	18	19	20	21	22	23	24	25	Owners	Pts
2003	Jay Godley	68	Chevy	DAY	DAR	MMR	MAR	CLT	DOV	TEX	MEM	MLW	KAN	KEN	GTW	MCH	IRP	NSH	BRI	RCH	NHA	CAL	LVS	SBO; 22	TEX	MAR; 20	PHO	HOM	64th	200
2004	Derrick Kelley	06	Chevy	DAY	ATL	MAR	MFD	CLT	DOV; 26	TEX	MEM																		38th	785
2004	Erik Darnell	06	Ford									MLW; 26	KAN																38th	785
2004	Jay Sauter	06	Chevy											KEN; 31	GTW	MCH	IRP	NSH; 21	BRI; 15	RCH; DNQ	NHA	LVS	CAL	TEX; DNQ	MAR	PHO	DAR; 26		38th	785
2004	Regan Smith	06	Chevy																									HOM; 9	38th	785
2005	Jimmy Kite	06	Chevy	DAY	CAL	ATL; 19	MAR	GTY; 18	MFD	CLT; DNQ	DOV	TEX; 24	MCH	MLW	KAN; 22	KEN	MEM	IRP	NSH										39th	835
2005	Mike Bliss	06	Chevy																	BRI; 11	RCH; DNQ	NHA	LVS	MAR					39th	835
2005	Regan Smith	06	Chevy																						ATL; 29	TEX; 33	PHO	HOM; 32	39th	835
2006	Chad McCumbee	06	Chevy	DAY; DNQ	CAL; 25	ATL; 27	MAR; 21	GTY; 11	CLT; 15	MFD; 31	DOV; 23	TEX	MCH	MLW	KAN	KEN	MEM	IRP	NSH	BRI	NHA	LVS	TAL	MAR	ATL	TEX	PHO	HOM	38th	709
2007	Blake Bjorklund	8	Chevy	DAY; 25	CAL; 31	ATL; 20	MAR; 19	KAN; 34	CLT; 20	MFD; 32	DOV; 16	TEX; 19	MCH; 21	MLW; 27	MEM; 25	KEN; 33	IRP; 27	NSH; 13											29th	2322
2007	Chad McCumbee	8	Chevy																BRI; 35	GTW; 15	NHA; 26	LVS; 10	TAL; 24		ATL; 27	TEX; 13		HOM; 22	29th	2322
2007	Travis Dassow	8	Chevy																					MAR; 31			PHO; 29		29th	2322
2008	Chad McCumbee	8	Chevy	DAY; 7	CAL; 18	ATL; 5	MAR; 32	KAN; 7	CLT; 2	MFD; 24	DOV; 12	TEX; 6	MCH; 9	MLW; 27	MEM; 15	KEN; 30	IRP; 31	NSH; 10	BRI; 11	GTW; 11	NHA; 11	LVS; 11	TAL; 10	MAR; 24	ATL; 15	TEX; 23	PHO; 12	HOM; 13	13th	2999
2009	Dennis Setzer	8	Chevy	DAY	CAL	ATL; 28	MAR; 7	KAN; 15	CLT; 10	DOV; 2	TEX; 17	MCH; 9	MLW; 2	MEM; 15	KEN; 10	IRP; 4	NSH; 8	BRI; 21	CHI; 6	IOW		NHA; 11	LVS	MAR; 7	TAL; 8	TEX	PHO	HOM	21st	2416
2009	Todd Kluever	8	Chevy																		GTW; 12								21st	2416
