= Matt Puccia =

American stock car racing crew chief

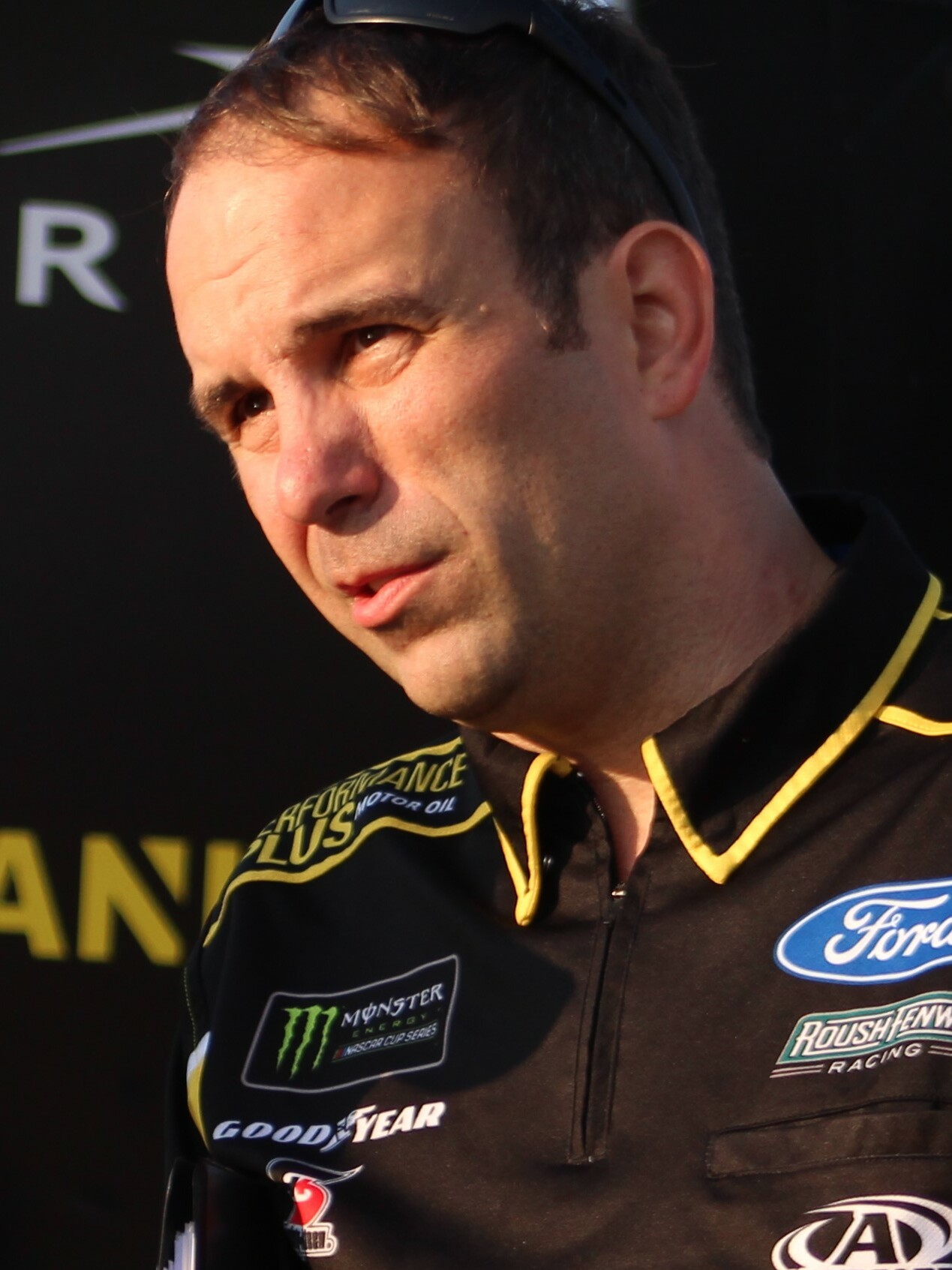
- Puccia at Richmond Raceway in 2018

Personal information
- Nationality: American
- Born: March 17, 1977 (age 49) Watertown, New York, U.S.

Sport
- Country: United States
- Sport: NASCAR Craftsman Truck Series
- Team: Tricon Garage

Matt Puccia (born March 17, 1977) is the Competition Director for the Tricon Garage racing team and former crew chief and Director of Operations for Roush Fenway Keslowski Racing.

== Racing career ==
Puccia began working in Ken Schrader’s race shop in the mid-1990's, and by 2004 had joined the Roush organization.

In 2006, Puccia was assigned to crew chief with the NASCAR Truck Series team, and three years later he became the crew chief for Paul Menard in the NASCAR Xfinity Series.

Puccia moved to Greg Biffle’s NASCAR Cup Series team mid-season in 2011 from Roush's research and development organization. He was named the Sprint Cup Series' 2012 Crew Chief of the Year. Puccia called 269 Cup Series events as a crew chief for Roush and notched three career victories and three Playoff appearances. He was named Director of Operations for Roush Fenway Keslowski Racing in October 2021.

In 2023, Puccia, moved to Tricon Garage, where he serves as the organizations Competition Director.
