= List of defunct NASCAR teams =

The following is a list of notable NASCAR teams that have officially closed down, with their last team name and driver. The list does not contain teams that have temporarily suspended operations. For those, see List of NASCAR teams. Some teams that are listed here no longer run that particular series, but may still be active in another series.

== NASCAR Cup Series ==
- A. J. Foyt Racing
- AK Racing
- Andy Petree Racing
- Arnold Motorsports
- Bahari Racing/Eel River Racing
- Bill Davis Racing
- Bill Elliott Racing
- BK Racing
- Blue Max Racing
- Brett Bodine Racing
- Buckshot Racing
- Bud Moore Engineering
- Competitive Edge Motorsports
- Dale Earnhardt, Inc.
- Darrell Waltrip Motorsports
- David Blair Motorsports
- Diamond Ridge Motorsports
- DiGard Motorsports
- Donlavey Racing
- Evernham Motorsports
- FILMAR Racing
- Furniture Row Racing
- Galaxy Motorsports
- HScott Motorsports
- Jasper Motorsports
- Lake Speed Racing
- Larry Hedrick Motorsports
- Mayfield Motorsports
- McGlynn Racing
- Melling Racing
- Michael Waltrip Racing
- Midwest Transit Racing
- Morgan–McClure Motorsports
- NEMCO Motorsports
- PE2 Motorsports
- Phoenix Racing
- PPI Motorsports
- Ppc Racing
- Precision Products Racing
- Red Bull Racing Team
- Robby Gordon Motorsports
- Rudd Performance Motorsports
- Stavola Brothers Racing
- Stewart–Haas Racing
- Swan Racing
- Triad Motorsports
- Yates Racing

== O'Reilly Auto Parts Series ==
- AP Performance Racing
- A. J. Foyt Racing
- Alumni Motorsports
- AM Racing
- Andy Petree Racing
- BACE Motorsports
- Bang! Racing
- Barrett-Cope Racing
- BLV Motorsports
- Bost Motorsports
- Carroll Racing
- Chance 2 Motorsports
- Chip Ganassi Racing
- Clay Andrews Racing
- Dale Earnhardt, Inc.
- DF2 Motorsports
- Emerald Performance Group
- FILMAR Racing
- Glynn Motorsports
- Hensley Motorsports
- Hillin Racing
- Herzog–Jackson Motorsports
- Hettinger Racing
- Hispanic Racing Team
- Innovative Motorsports
- J&J Racing
- JD Motorsports
- JG Motorsports
- Jim & Judie Motorsports
- Joe Bessey Racing
- Keith Coleman Racing
- Kevin Harvick Incorporated
- Labonte Motorsports
- Larry Hedrick Motorsports
- Lockamy Racing
- Marsh Racing
- MB2 Motorsports
- Michael Waltrip Racing
- Moy Racing
- NorthStar Motorsports
- Our Motorsports
- Parker Racing
- Precision Performance Motorsports
- Roush Fenway Racing
- Shoemaker Racing
- Specialty Racing
- Spencer Motor Ventures
- Stewart–Haas Racing
- Team Bristol Motorsports
- Washington-Erving Motorsports
- Whitaker Racing
- Xpress Motorsports

== Craftsman Truck Series ==
- Addington Racing
- Andy Petree Racing
- AM Racing
- Bang! Racing
- Brad Keselowski Racing
- Bret Holmes Racing
- Clean Line Racing
- CJ Racing
- Dale Earnhardt, Inc.
- Faction46
- Faith Motorsports
- Fiddleback Racing
- Germain Racing
- Glynn Motorsports
- GMS Racing
- Hendrick Motorsports
- Hill Motorsports
- Impact Motorsports
- Innovative Motorsports
- Joe Gibbs Racing
- JR Motorsports
- Kevin Harvick Incorporated
- Kyle Busch Motorsports
- Mansion Motorsports
- McGlynn Racing
- Orleans Racing
- On Point Motorsports
- Petty Enterprises
- Phelon Racing
- Rackley W.A.R.
- Red Horse Racing
- Rev Racing
- Richard Childress Racing
- Richardson Motorsports
- Roadrunner Motorsports
- Roehig Racing
- Roush Fenway Racing
- Sharp Gallaher Racing
- Spears Motorsports
- Sutton Motorsports
- Tagsby Racing
- Team EJP Racing
- Team Rensi Motorsports
- TKO Motorsports
- Ultra Motorsports
- Victory in Jesus Racing
- Ware Racing Enterprises
