= Larry McReynolds =

NASCAR crew chief and TV broadcaster

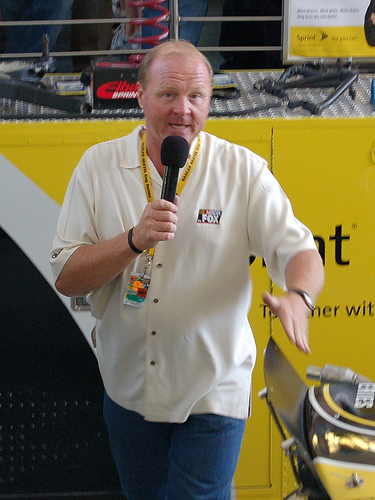
- McReynolds on NASCAR Performance in 2005
- Born: Lawrence Joseph McReynolds III; January 10, 1959 (age 67); Birmingham, Alabama, U.S.
- Other names: Larry Mac, America's Crew Chief, Larry McNuggets
- Occupations: NASCAR crew chief Fox NASCAR commentator
- Years active: 1975–present
- Known for: Winning the Daytona 500 as a crew chief twice (1992 with Davey Allison and 1998 with Dale Earnhardt)

Lawrence Joseph McReynolds III (born January 10, 1959) is an American NASCAR television commentator for NASCAR on Fox and NASCAR on TNT, also for the freedom 500 and a semi-retired crew chief.

As a full-time NASCAR Cup Series crew chief from the 1980s until 2000, he won 23 races, including 2 Daytona 500's. He has been a commentator for NASCAR on Fox ever since the network started covering NASCAR in 2001. He was a color commentator in their Cup Series booth from 2001 to 2015 and since 2016 has been their rules and technical analyst.

McReynolds also briefly served as an advisor to Petty Enterprises in 2002, and was a minority owner of Bang! Racing, a team that competed in the NASCAR Craftsman Truck Series for 1 year in 2004.

== Career ==
=== Crew chiefing ===
McReynolds was born in Birmingham, Alabama, and is an only child. His NASCAR career began in 1975. He worked his way up the ladder and took his first crew chief job in 1985.

He served as a Winston Cup crew chief from 1985 to 2000, amassing 23 Cup wins, 21 poles, 122 top-five and 209 top-ten finishes. In 1988, McReynolds earned his first Cup win at Watkins Glen International with driver Ricky Rudd.

McReynolds began 1991 with King Racing and driver Brett Bodine, but after the spring Atlanta race, left to become the crew chief for Robert Yates Racing and its famed No. 28, with driver Davey Allison. McReynolds and Allison combined to win 11 races and three pole positions between 1991 and mid-1993, establishing himself as one of the sport's elite crew chiefs. He led Allison to a win in the 1992 Daytona 500, and the two swept the NASCAR All-Star Race (then The Winston) in 1991–92. He nearly won the series points championship with Allison in 1992, with the title chase going down to the final race.

After Allison died in 1993 following a helicopter crash, McReynolds began working with driver Ernie Irvan, who left his ride at Morgan-McClure Motorsports under controversial circumstances to take over for his fallen friend. Immediately the partnership paid dividends, as Irvan won two of the nine races he drove the No. 28 and recorded six top five finishes. McReynolds helped drive the success of the No. 28 the next year as Irvan won three times and was a strong contender to unseat Dale Earnhardt as champion.

Then, on the morning before the spring race at Michigan, tragedy struck again. McReynolds, in an interview for The Scene Vault Podcast in 2020 described the situation as such. The Saturday morning prior to the race, the No. 28 was on the track for a practice session. After ten laps, McReynolds called Irvan to bring the car back in because he did not like the way it was running. Irvan would run one lap at highest speed before bringing the car in, as was his habit. McReynolds did not see Irvan blow a tire and crash on the backstretch, which caused a massive head injury. He said, once he found out of the extent of Irvan's injury and the likelihood that he might not survive, he was ready to leave motorsports altogether having had two of his drivers die while he was leading their pit crews.

After running the rest of the season with substitute drivers, McReynolds convinced team owner Robert Yates to sign Dale Jarrett to drive for him in 1995; although Jarrett finished outside of the top ten in points McReynolds did lead him to victory at Pocono.

After one more season as crew chief for the returning Irvan, who missed most of 1995 recovering from his injuries, McReynolds took over as Earnhardt's crew chief for 1997 after his former crew chief Andy Petree left to form his own racing team. Despite not winning a race, McReynolds brought the team a top ten points finish and he was on the pit box for what was Earnhardt's biggest win as a driver, his victory in the 1998 Daytona 500. He was then moved over to the No. 31 car driven by Mike Skinner. He led the No. 31 team to a top ten points finish in 1999, and a 12th place finish in the points in 2000. McReynolds ended his career as a crew chief after the 2000 season. During his career as a crew chief, his cars had 23 victories in 417 starts.

McReynolds' success and thorough approach to his profession earned him selection to the Copenhagen/Skoal All-Pro Team, an all-star "who's who" of crew members, for five straight years (1991–1995), and the 1998 UAW GM Teamwork of Excellence award.

While working as a color commentator for Fox, McReynolds did serve as an advisor for Petty Enterprises in 2002, working to improve the performance of the team's No. 44 car driven by Buckshot Jones at the beginning of the season.

In 2004, McReynolds was a co-owner of the Bang! Racing team that competed in the NASCAR Craftsman Truck Series. The team was one of the original Toyota Truck Series teams in the manufacturer's first season in NASCAR. He left the ownership group halfway through the season. After only 1 year, the team closed down prior to the 2005 season due to financial problems and controversies.

On April 17, 2022, McReynolds announced that he would make his return as a NASCAR crew chief, working with Jeffrey Earnhardt at the 2022 Ag-Pro 300 for Richard Childress Racing. It would be the first time in 22 years that McReynolds would call the race from the pit box. The team ended up winning the pole during qualifying, posting a record time of 52.454. The team led 10 laps in the 124 lap race extended by overtime, finishing in 2nd.

In 2023, McReynolds would be the crew chief for Jordan Anderson in the 2023 Wawa 250. Anderson started 37th and finished 15th.

In 2024, McReynolds would return to crew chief for Anderson for both races at Daytona. Anderson would start the 2024 United Rentals 300 29th and finish in 4th. He would start the 2024 Wawa 250 25th and finish in 6th.

=== Broadcasting ===
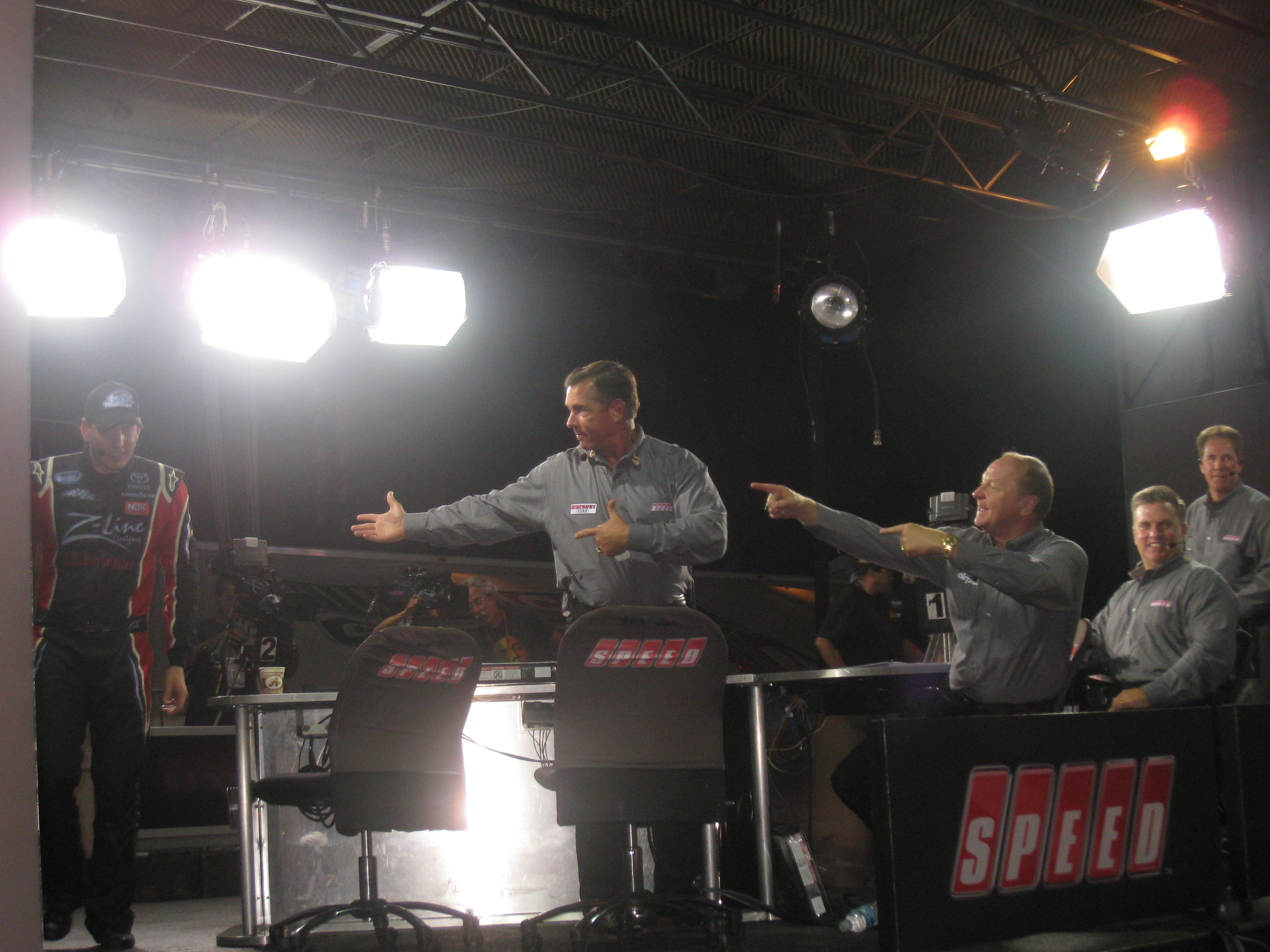
McReynolds on a NASCAR on Speed broadcast in 2009 alongside Jeff Hammond, Steve Byrnes and Darrell Waltrip

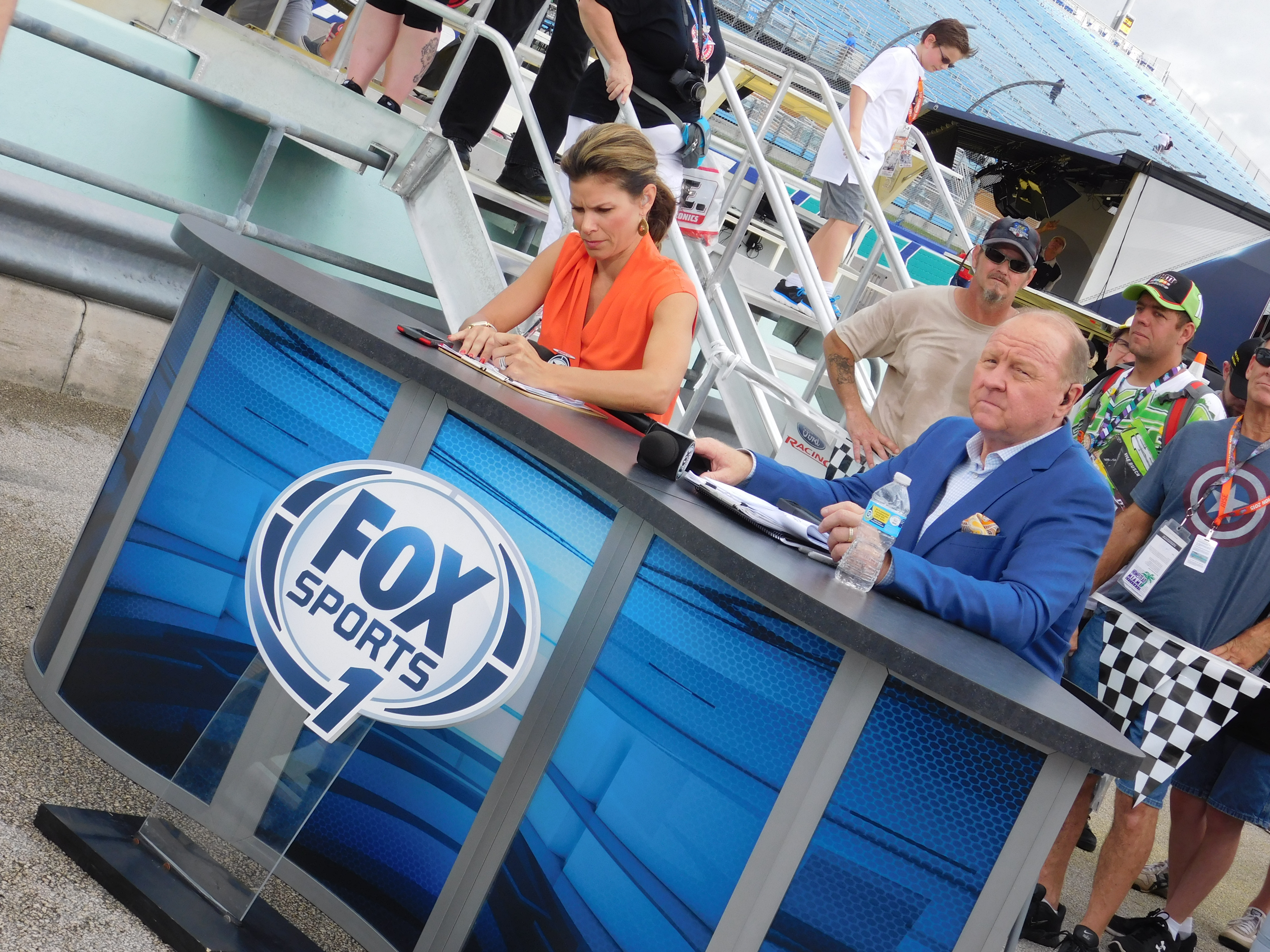
McReynolds and Jamie Little on a Fox broadcast in 2015

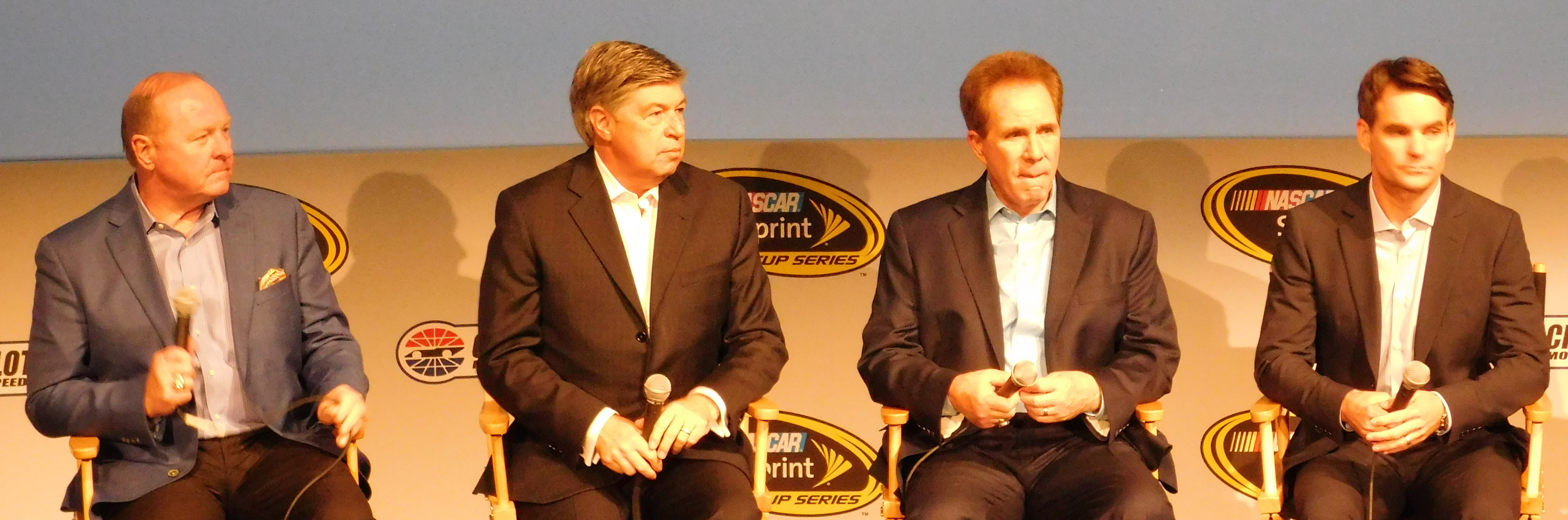
McReynolds, Mike Joy, Darrell Waltrip and Jeff Gordon in 2016

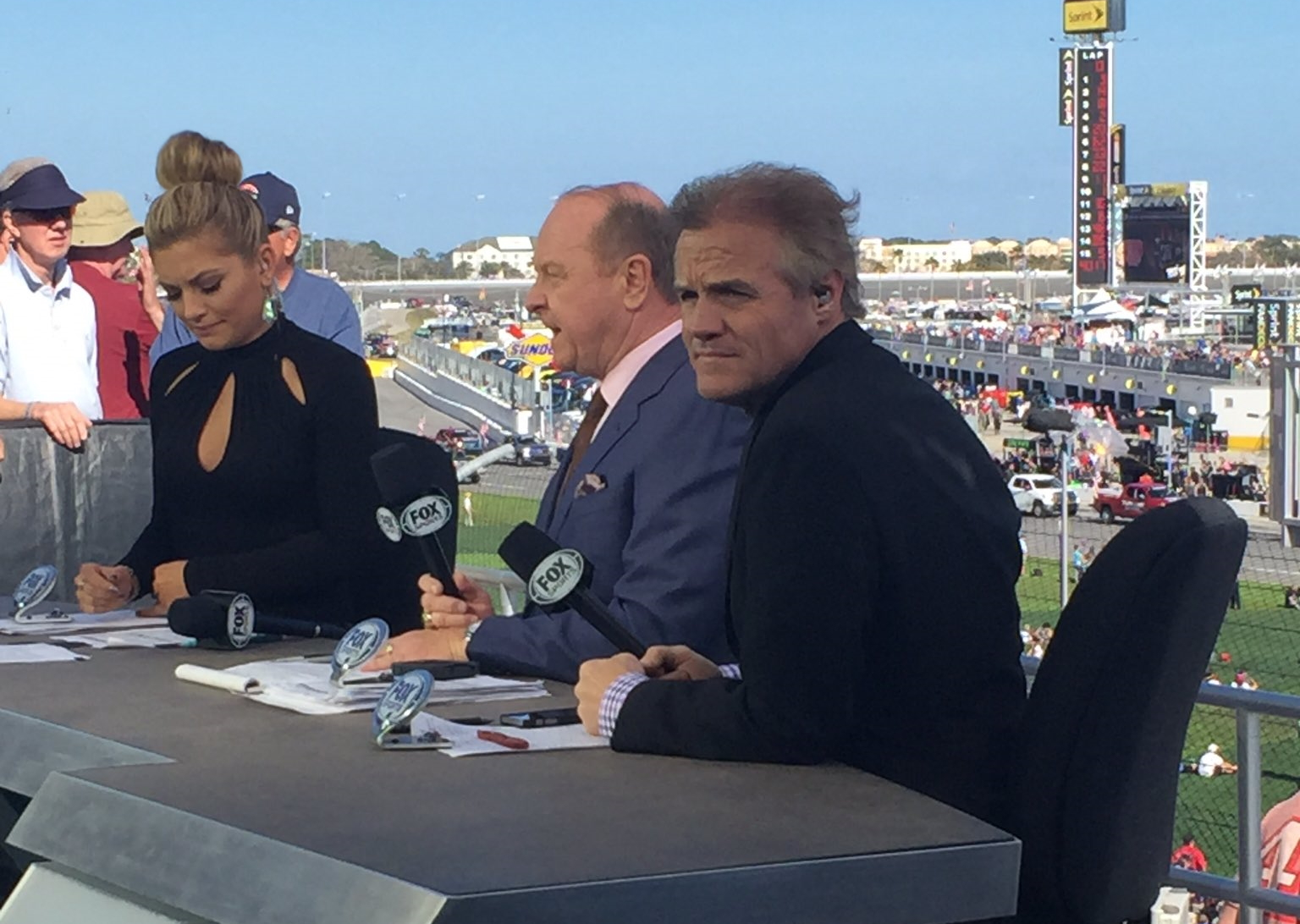
McReynolds, Danielle Trotta and Kenny Wallace on NASCAR RaceDay at Daytona in February 2016

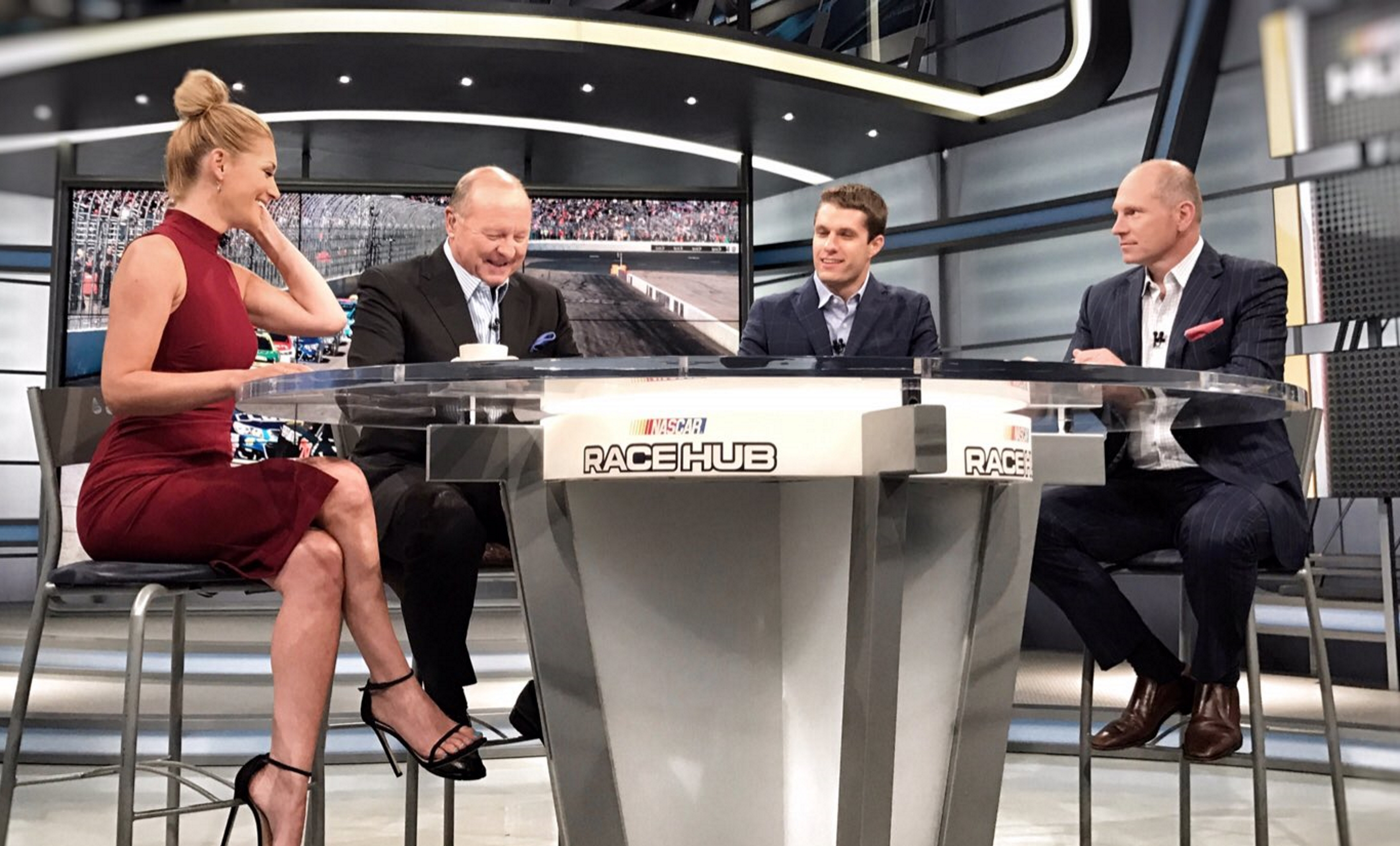
McReynolds, Trotta, David Ragan and Adam Alexander on an episode of NASCAR Race Hub in September 2016

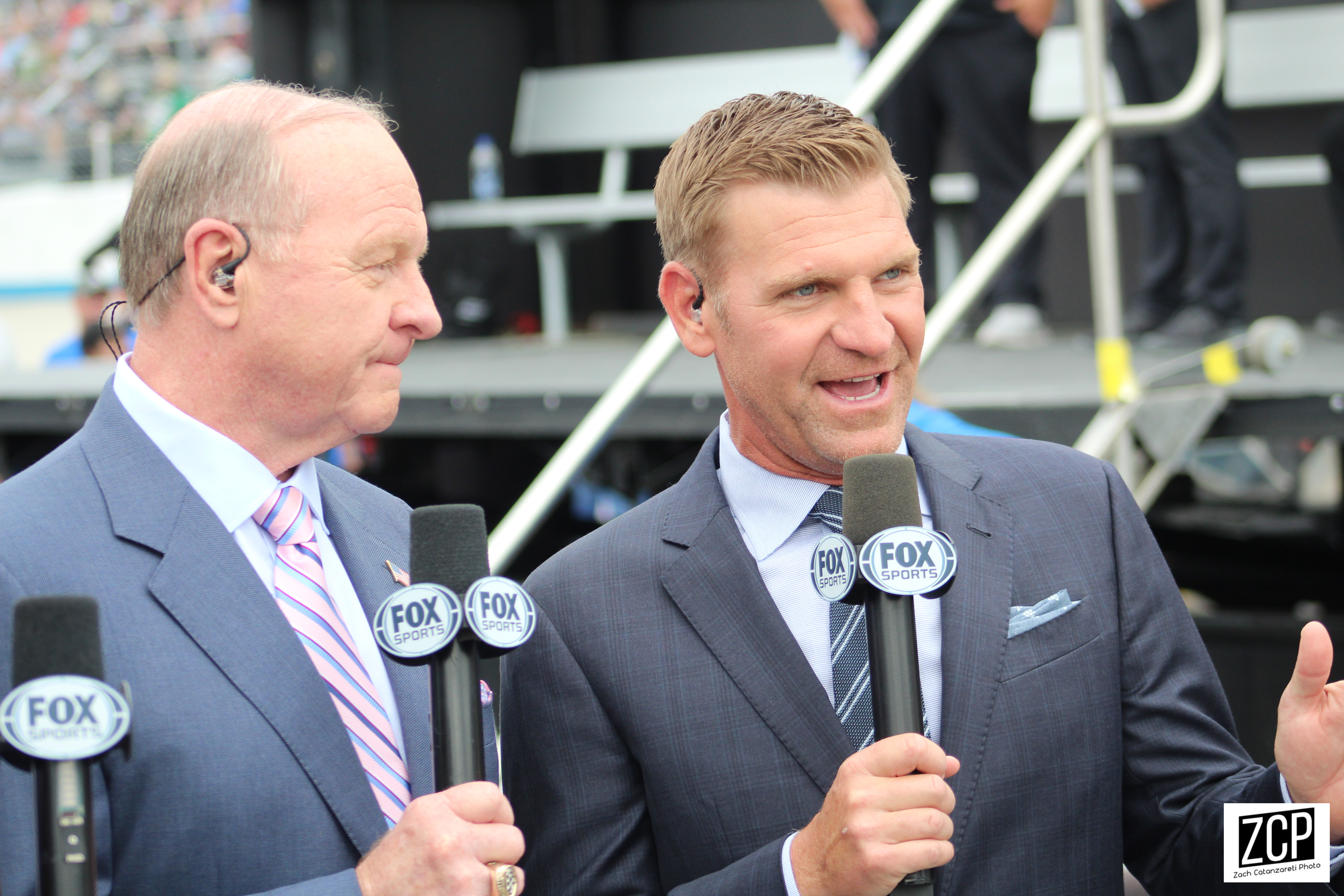
McReynolds and Clint Bowyer on a Fox broadcast in 2022

At the end of the 2000 season, McReynolds left the Richard Childress-owned No. 31 Chevrolet and ventured into the Fox Sports broadcast booth with Mike Joy and 3-time Winston Cup champion Darrell Waltrip. The three called the NASCAR Cup Series races for NASCAR on Fox from 2001 through 2015 and also called Busch Series races from 2001 to 2006. In 2015, he served as an analyst for Fox Sports 1's live race coverage of the Xfinity Series, in addition to serving as an analyst on FS1's NASCAR RaceDay and NASCAR RaceDay-Xfinity, the network's pre-race shows for the Monster Energy Cup Series and Xfinity Series, and NASCAR Race Hub, its daily NASCAR news and highlight show. McReynolds, who was inducted into the Alabama Auto Racing Pioneers Hall of Fame in December 2013, was a longtime panelist on NASCAR Trackside and NASCAR Performance on Speed. Starting in 2016, McReynolds served as an in-race analyst for Fox as Jeff Gordon replaced him as a color commentator in the booth alongside Joy and Waltrip after he retired from full-time driving in NASCAR after the 2015 season.

McReynolds is co-host with Danielle Trotta on SiriusXM NASCAR Radio on their show On Track. The program runs 11:00 a.m. to 1:00 p.m. Eastern Time Monday-Friday. During the first half of the racing season when FOX Sports carries the broadcast, he sometimes misses broadcasts due to conflicts with his television schedule.

He was a roving reporter for the six Cup Series races on TNT during the 2007, 2008, 2009, 2010, and 2011 Cup seasons. From 2012 to 2014, he worked as a co-host (along with Kyle Petty and Adam Alexander) for the pre-race segments on TNT. When TNT re-gained TV rights to NASCAR in the new Cup Series TV contract from 2025 to 2031, McReynolds returned to TNT and would work alongside Jeff Burton on their alternate broadcast on TruTV.

== Personal life ==
McReynolds was inducted into The Oceanside Rotary Club Hall of Fame in Daytona Beach, Florida in 2008. In 2009, McReynolds received the Living Legends of Auto Racing Russ Moyer Media Award.

He played himself in the 2006 movie Talladega Nights: The Ballad of Ricky Bobby. McReynolds also co-hosted the NASCAR Performance Show with Steve Post on Motor Racing Network (MRN) between 2004 and 2013, and co-authored the books The Big Picture: My Life from Pit Road to the Broadcast Booth and How to Become a Winning Crew Chief.

McReynolds' son Brandon McReynolds is a racing driver and spotter. His daughter Kendall is married to NASCAR Xfinity Series owner and driver Jordan Anderson.
