= Sean Murphy (racing driver) =

New Zealand racing driver (born 1984)

- Born: June 29, 1984 (age 42); Auckland, New Zealand
- Awards: 2007 Pat Burdow Memorial Rookie of the Year Award

NASCAR O'Reilly Auto Parts Series career
- 3 races run over 1 year
- Best finish: 87th (2009)
- First race: 2009 U.S. Cellular 250 (Iowa)
- Last race: 2009 Food City 250 (Bristol)
Wins	Top tens	Poles
0	0	0

NASCAR FedEx Freight Truck Series career
- 26 races run over 6 years
- Best finish: 37th (2005)
- First race: 2004 Kroger 200 (Martinsville)
- Last race: 2010 NextEra Energy Resources 250 (Daytona)
Wins	Top tens	Poles
0	1	0
- Statistics up to date as of March 22, 2020.

Sean Murphy (born June 29, 1984) is an American former professional stock car racing driver who competed in the NASCAR Nationwide Series, NASCAR Camping World Truck Series, IMSA and the ASA Series. He currently is an entrepreneur.

== Racing career ==
Murphy ran two races (at the Miami street course and Road Atlanta) in Konrad Motorsports' No. 25 Saleen S7R in the 2002 American Le Mans Series season, teaming up with Charles Slater in both races as well as Jean-François Yvon at Road Atlanta. He also drove for Konrad in one Grand-Am race at the Daytona road course that year in their No. 31, sharing the car with Franz Konrad.

Murphy made his first start in the NASCAR Craftsman Truck Series at Martinsville Speedway in late 2004 driving for Green Light Racing in the No. 07 Chevrolet Silverado. He had a solid debut, qualifying 19th and finishing 22nd. The deal gave Murphy an opportunity to race for the remaining three races of the season for the team (two races in the No. 07 and one in the No. 08). At the next race at Phoenix, Murphy finished 24th, but also led two laps. At Homestead-Miami, Murphy led ten laps due to pit strategy before his engine expired.

Murphy ran a total of 14 races in 2005-2006, once again all for Green Light Racing. His best finish was a 13th at Atlanta. He earned his first career lead-lap finish at Fontana that year. Also, at Atlanta, Murphy led his only lap on the season. However, sponsorship did not materialize and after the race at Michigan, Green Light found other drivers to drive the truck for the rest of the year.

In February 2007, Murphy competed in the 41st Annual World Series of Asphalt Stock Car Racing at New Smyrna Speedway in New Smyrna Beach, Florida. Murphy was scheduled to race in three races that took place on consecutive nights. Murphy qualified on the pole for the Thursday night race, but rain and thunder caused that night's activities to be canceled. On Friday night, Murphy qualified on the outside pole, but did not start the race due to a mechanical problem with his car. Murphy qualified on the pole for the second time on Saturday, but due to a problem he was forced to start in the rear of the pack. After a long week of frustration and disappointment, the team's hard work finally paid off when Murphy crossed the finish line in fifth place.

Murphy spent 2007 racing with SS Racing and competing for the ASA Super Late Model Challenge Series division title. He was awarded the ASA-Late Model Series Pat Burdow Memorial Rookie of the Year Title on Saturday at Five Flags Speedway. Murphy qualified with the fastest time for the fourth time and set a new ASALMS track record for the three times during the season (all divisions).

Returning to the No. 07 truck of the renamed SS-Green Light Racing in 2008, Murphy earned his first and only top-ten in the Truck Series at Mansfield, which was also his best finish of the season. He drove in five other races after that: Milwaukee, IRP, Bristol, Las Vegas, and Talladega.

Murphy made his Nationwide Series debut in 2009, running three races (Iowa, Watkins Glen, and Bristol) in the No. 81 Dodge for MacDonald Motorsports. His best finish was a 20th at Bristol. He continued to compete in the Truck Series for SSGLR, this year in the No. 08 in all his starts (due to Chad McCumbee driving the No. 07 full-time in 2009). After running three races in that truck, he drove the No. 21 Dodge for GunBroker Racing at Talladega that year, substituting for Nick Tucker, the normal driver of that truck, who had never raced on a restrictor plate track before and was not cleared to race that weekend.

Murphy returned to SS-Green Light again in 2010, driving the No. 07 truck in the season-opener at Daytona. The team indicated that they wanted him to run the full season if sponsorship could be found, but it was not. The team ended up having multiple drivers in the No. 07 that year, and that race, which Murphy finished 13th in, ended up being his last start in NASCAR.

== Personal life ==
Although he was born in Auckland, New Zealand, Murphy currently resides in Fort Lauderdale, Florida with girlfriend, Julie DeVries, and their two dogs. He works as an entrepreneur. He graduated from Broward College.

== Motorsports career results ==
=== NASCAR ===
(key) (Bold – Pole position awarded by qualifying time. Italics – Pole position earned by points standings or practice time. * – Most laps led.)

==== Nationwide Series ====
NASCAR Nationwide Series results
Year	Team	No.	Make	1	2	3	4	5	6	7	8	9	10	11	12	13	14	15	16	17	18	19	20	21	22	23	24	25	26	27	28	29	30	31	32	33	34	35	NNSC	Pts	Ref
2009	MacDonald Motorsports	81	Dodge	DAY	CAL	LVS	BRI	TEX	NSH	PHO	TAL	RCH	DAR	CLT	DOV	NSH	KEN	MLW	NHA	DAY	CHI	GTY	IRP	IOW; 27	GLN; 23	MCH	BRI; 20	CGV	ATL	RCH	DOV	KAN	CAL	CLT	MEM	TEX	PHO	HOM	87th	279	

^{*} Season still in progress
^{1} Ineligible for series points

==== Camping World Truck Series ====
NASCAR Camping World Truck Series results
Year	Team	No.	Make	1	2	3	4	5	6	7	8	9	10	11	12	13	14	15	16	17	18	19	20	21	22	23	24	25	NCWTC	Pts	Ref
2004	Groove Motorsports	30	Chevy	DAY	ATL	MAR	MFD; DNQ	CLT	DOV	TEX	MEM	MLW	KAN	KEN	GTW	MCH	IRP; DNQ	NSH	BRI	RCH	NHA	LVS	CAL	TEX					51st	338	
2004	Green Light Racing	07	Chevy																						MAR; 22	PHO; 24		HOM; 30	51st	338	
2004	Green Light Racing	08	Chevy																								DAR; 32		51st	338	
2005	Green Light Racing	07	Chevy	DAY; 24	CAL; 19	ATL; 13	MAR; 31	GTY; 29	MFD	CLT; 29	DOV	TEX	MCH; 18	MLW	KAN	KEN	MEM	IRP	NSH	BRI	RCH	NHA	LVS	MAR	ATL	TEX	PHO	HOM	37th	657	
2006	Green Light Racing	07	Chevy	DAY; 20	CAL	ATL; 32	MAR	GTY															TAL; 32	MAR	ATL	TEX	PHO	HOM	50th	315	
2006	Green Light Racing	08	Chevy						CLT; 30	MFD	DOV	TEX	MCH	MLW	KAN	KEN	MEM	IRP	NSH	BRI	NHA	LVS							50th	315	
2008	SS-Green Light Racing	07	Chevy	DAY	CAL	ATL	MAR	KAN	CLT	MFD; 9	DOV	TEX	MCH	MLW; 26	MEM	KEN	IRP; 27	NSH	BRI; 17	GTW	NHA	LVS; 15	TAL; 30	MAR	ATL	TEX	PHO	HOM	40th	608	
2009	SS-Green Light Racing	08	Chevy	DAY	CAL	ATL	MAR; 36	KAN	CLT	DOV	TEX	MCH; 35	MLW	MEM	KEN; 31	IRP	NSH	BRI	CHI	IOW	GTW	NHA	LVS	MAR					61st	247	
2009	GunBroker Racing	21	Dodge																						TAL; 33	TEX	PHO	HOM	61st	247	
2010	SS-Green Light Racing	07	Chevy	DAY; 13	ATL	MAR	NSH	KAN	DOV	CLT	TEX	MCH	IOW	GTY	IRP	POC	NSH	DAR	BRI	CHI	KEN	NHA	LVS	MAR	TAL	TEX	PHO	HOM	90th	124	
