= Kevin Love (racing driver) =

American racing driver (born 1979)

- Born: June 8, 1979 (age 47); Concord, NC, U.S.

NASCAR FedEx Freight Truck Series career
- 5 races run over 1 year
- Best finish: 41st (2004)
- First race: 2004 Kroger 250 (Martinsville)
- Last race: 2004 O'Reilly Auto Parts 250 (Kansas
Wins	Top tens	Poles
0	0	0

Kevin Love (born June 8, 1979) is an American former stock car racing driver. He ran five races in the 2004 Craftsman Truck Series season, all for Fiddleback Racing.

== Racing career ==
Born in Concord, NC, Love raced late models in North Carolina. Love was a two-time champion in the Coca-Cola Cup Late Model Stock Car Championship, a member of the NASCAR Weekly Racing Series.

Love first raced in the Hooters Pro Cup Series in 2002, driving the No. 60 Chevrolet, finishing twelfth in his debut at Jennerstown Speedway. He made two more starts in 2002, finishing seventh and 30th at Lonesome Pine Speedway and Concord Speedway, respectively, the latter ending with a DNF due to a mechanical failure. Love returned to the series in 2003 at Concord, but finished 28th due to another mechanical failure.

In 2004, Love made his NASCAR Truck Series debut in the No. 67 Fiddleback Ford in the Kroger 250 at Martinsville Speedway, starting 30th and finishing 27th at the short track, two laps down. Love failed to qualify for the UAW/GM Ohio 250 at Mansfield Motorsports Park after qualifying was rained out, and the No. 67 had no owners' points, and Todd Bodine took over the No. 67 for the Infineon 200 at Lowe's Motor Speedway, though Love returned for his next start at Dover. He finished 24th after crashing on the frontstretch on lap 152. He ran with Fiddleback again at Memphis, finishing 21st. After a 24th at the Milwaukee Mile, Love finished a career-best eleventh at Kansas Speedway. However, this would be his final start in the No. 67.

In 2006, Love competed in the Pro All-Stars Series, finishing thirteenth in the championship.

== Motorsports career results ==
=== NASCAR ===
(key) (Bold - Pole position awarded by qualifying time. Italics - Pole position earned by points standings or practice time. * – Most laps led.)

==== Craftsman Truck Series ====
NASCAR Craftsman Truck Series results
Year	Team	No.	Make	1	2	3	4	5	6	7	8	9	10	11	12	13	14	15	16	17	18	19	20	21	22	23	24	25	NCTC	Pts	Ref
2004	Fiddle Back Racing	67	Ford	DAY	ATL	MAR; 27	MFD; DNQ	CLT	DOV; 24	TEX	MEM; 21	MLW; 24	KAN; 11	KEN	GTW	MCH	IRP	NSH	BRI	RCH	NHA	LVS	CAL	TEX	MAR	PHO	DAR	HOM	41st	494	
