= Richard Hampton =

American racing driver

- Born: June 30, 1956 (age 70); Seymour, Indiana, U.S.

ARCA Menards Series career
- 88 races run over 13 years
- Best finish: 11th (1985)
- First race: 1983 Texaco-Lomax Piggyback American 100 (Springfield)
- Last race: 2001 BetOnUSA.com 150 (Watkins Glen)
Wins	Top tens	Poles
0	19	0
- Statistics up to date as of December 3, 2024.

Richard Hampton (born June 30, 1956) is an American former professional stock car racing driver who has previously competed in the ARCA Re/Max Series from 1983 to 2005.

Hampton has also competed in the X-1R Pro Cup Series, the ASA National Tour, and the ASA National Late Model Sportsman Series.

== Motorsports career results ==
=== NASCAR ===
(key) (Bold - Pole position awarded by qualifying time. Italics - Pole position earned by points standings or practice time. * – Most laps led.)

==== Busch Series ====
NASCAR Busch Series results
Year	Team	No.	Make	1	2	3	4	5	6	7	8	9	10	11	12	13	14	15	16	17	18	19	20	21	22	23	24	25	26	27	NBSC	Pts	Ref
1985	N/A	3	Pontiac	DAY	CAR	HCY	BRI	MAR	DAR	SBO	LGY	DOV	CLT	SBO	HCY	ROU	IRP; DNQ	SBO	LGY	HCY	MLW	BRI	DAR	RCH	NWS	ROU	CLT	HCY	CAR	MAR	N/A	0	

==== Craftsman Truck Series ====
NASCAR Craftsman Truck Series results
Year	Team	No.	Make	1	2	3	4	5	6	7	8	9	10	11	12	13	14	15	16	17	18	19	20	21	22	23	24	25	NCTC	Pts	Ref
2004	Richard Hampton	19	Chevy	DAY	ATL	MAR; DNQ	MFD; DNQ	CLT	DOV	TEX	MEM	MLW	KAN	KEN	GTW	MCH	IRP	NSH	BRI	RCH	NHA	LVS	CAL	TEX	MAR	PHO	DAR	HOM	N/A	0	

=== ARCA Re/Max Series ===
(key) (Bold – Pole position awarded by qualifying time. Italics – Pole position earned by points standings or practice time. * – Most laps led. ** – All laps led.)

ARCA Re/Max Series results
Year	Team	No.	Make	1	2	3	4	5	6	7	8	9	10	11	12	13	14	15	16	17	18	19	20	21	22	23	24	25	ARMSC	Pts	Ref
1983	Dan Bowdon	12	Ford	DAY	NSV	TAL	LPR	LPR	ISF; 6	IRP; 17	SSP; 10	FRS; 14	BFS; 7	WIN; 12	LPR; 14	POC; 10	TAL; 23	MCS	FRS	MIL	DSF; 12	ZAN	SND; 15						12th	890	
1984	Richard Hampton	12	Ford	DAY; 27	ATL; 23	TAL; 35	CSP; 12	SMS; 17	FRS; 15	MCS; 21	LCS; 18	IRP; 14	TAL	FRS	ISF	DSF	TOL	MGR; 13											17th	660	
1985	John Litton	3	Olds	ATL; 39																									11th	1550	
1985	John Litton	3	Pontiac		DAY; 32	ATL; 16	TAL; 19	ATL; 15	SSP; 12	IRP	CSP; 8	FRS; 8	IRP; 9	OEF; 12	ISF; 17	DSF; 35	TOL; 13												11th	1550	
1988	N/A	53	Ford	DAY	ATL	TAL	FRS	PCS	ROC	POC	WIN	KIL	ACS	SLM	POC	TAL	DEL	FRS	ISF	DSF	SLM; 16	ATL							N/A	0	
1991	N/A	32	Ford	DAY	ATL	KIL	TAL	TOL	FRS	POC	MCH	KIL; 8	FRS; 6	DEL; 13	POC	TAL	HPT	MCH	ISF	TOL	DSF	TWS	ATL						N/A	0	
1992	N/A	32	Ford	DAY	FIF	TWS	TAL	TOL; 12	KIL	POC	MCH	FRS	KIL	NSH	DEL	POC	HPT	FRS	ISF	TOL	DSF	TWS	SLM	ATL					N/A	0	
1996	Richard Hampton	0	Chevy	DAY	ATL	SLM	TAL	FIF	LVL	CLT	CLT	KIL	FRS	POC	MCH	FRS; 18	TOL; 9	POC	MCH	INF; 24	SBS	ISF	DSF	KIL	SLM	WIN	CLT	ATL	N/A	0	
1997	Richard Hampton	0	Chevy	DAY	ATL	SLM; 5	CLT	CLT	POC	MCH	SBS; 16	TOL; 27	KIL; 15	FRS; 17	MIN	POC	MCH	DSF; 18		SLM; 8	WIN; 9	CLT	TAL						N/A	0	
1997	N/A	8	Chevy																GTW; 19										N/A	0	
1997	Richard Hampton	0	Buick																					ISF; 26	ATL				N/A	0	
1998	Richard Hampton	0	Chevy	DAY	ATL	SLM; 28	CLT	MEM; 11	MCH	POC	SBS; 8	TOL; 30	PPR	POC	KIL; 14	FRS; 11	ISF; 16	ATL	DSF; 16	SLM; 26	TEX; 22	WIN; 18	CLT; DNQ	TAL	ATL				N/A	0	
1999	Richard Hampton	0	Chevy	DAY	ATL	SLM; 25	AND; 11	CLT	MCH	POC	TOL; 27	SBS; 9	BLN; 15	POC	KIL; 16	FRS; 9	FLM; 26	ISF; 27	WIN; 15	DSF; 19	SLM; 14	CLT	TAL	ATL					20th	1695	
2000	Richard Hampton	0	Chevy	DAY	SLM; 19	AND; 9	CLT; DNQ	KIL; 13	FRS; 10	MCH	POC	TOL; 18	KEN; 27	BLN; 11	POC	WIN; 18	ISF; 13	KEN; 22	DSF; 8	SLM; 12	CLT	TAL	ATL						18th	1860	
2001	Richard Hampton	0	Chevy	DAY	NSH	WIN	SLM	GTY	KEN	CLT	KAN	MCH	POC	MEM	GLN; 20	KEN	MCH	POC	NSH	ISF	CHI	DSF	SLM	TOL	BLN	CLT	TAL	ATL	147th	130	
2005	Hixson Motorsports	2	Chevy	DAY	NSH	SLM; DNQ	KEN	TOL; DNQ	LAN	MIL	POC	MCH	KAN	KEN	BLN	POC	GTW	LER	NSH	MCH	ISF	TOL	DSF	CHI	SLM	TAL			N/A	0	
