= Jamey Caudill =

American racing driver

- Born: January 8, 1970 (age 56); Four Oaks, North Carolina, U.S.

NASCAR O'Reilly Auto Parts Series career
- 1 race run over 1 year
- Best finish: 143rd (2004)
- First race: 2004 Sam's Town 250 benefitting St. Jude (Memphis)
Wins	Top tens	Poles
0	0	0

NASCAR FedEx Freight Truck Series career
- 4 races run over 2 years
- Best finish: 66th (2004)
- First race: 2002 O'Reilly Auto Parts 200 (Memphis)
- Last race: 2004 O'Reilly 200 (Memphis)
Wins	Top tens	Poles
0	0	0
- Statistics up to date as of October 21, 2025.

Jamey Caudill (born January 8, 1970) is an American professional stock car racing driver. He has previously competed in the NASCAR Busch Series and NASCAR Craftsman Truck Series between 2002 and 2004.

Caudill has also previously competed in series such as the CARS Tour, the Virginia Late Model Triple Crown Series, the Dirty Dozen Series, the UARA STARS Late Model Series, and the NASCAR Weekly Series, and is a former track champion at Southern National Motorsports Park.

== Motorsports results ==
=== NASCAR ===
(key) (Bold – Pole position awarded by qualifying time. Italics – Pole position earned by points standings or practice time. * – Most laps led.)

==== Busch Series ====
NASCAR Busch Series results
Year	Team	No.	Make	1	2	3	4	5	6	7	8	9	10	11	12	13	14	15	16	17	18	19	20	21	22	23	24	25	26	27	28	29	30	31	32	33	34	NBSC	Pts	Ref
2004	Long Brothers Racing	83	Ford	DAY	CAR	LVS	DAR	BRI	TEX	NSH	TAL	CAL	GTY	RCH	NZH	CLT	DOV	NSH	KEN	MLW	DAY	CHI	NHA	PPR	IRP	MCH	BRI	CAL	RCH	DOV	KAN	CLT	MEM; 38	ATL	PHO	DAR	HOM	143rd	49	

==== Craftsman Truck Series ====
NASCAR Craftsman Truck Series results
Year	Team	No.	Make	1	2	3	4	5	6	7	8	9	10	11	12	13	14	15	16	17	18	19	20	21	22	23	24	25	NCTS	Pts	Ref
2002	Long Brothers Racing	84	Ford	DAY	DAR	MAR	GTY	PPR	DOV	TEX	MEM; 31	MLW	KAN	KEN	NHA	MCH	IRP	NSH	RCH	TEX	SBO; 34	LVS	CAL	PHO	HOM				92nd	70	
2004	Long Brothers Racing	84	Ford	DAY	ATL	MAR; 19	MFD	CLT	DOV	TEX	MEM; 29	MLW	KAN	KEN	GTW	MCH	IRP	NSH	BRI	RCH	NHA	LVS	CAL	TEX	MAR	PHO	DAR	HOM	66th	182	

=== CARS Late Model Stock Car Tour ===
(key) (Bold – Pole position awarded by qualifying time. Italics – Pole position earned by points standings or practice time. * – Most laps led. ** – All laps led.)

CARS Late Model Stock Car Tour results
Year	Team	No.	Make	1	2	3	4	5	6	7	8	9	10	11	12	13	14	15	16	17	CLMSCTC	Pts	Ref
2015	Atlantic Resources	50	Ford	SNM; 19	ROU; 5	HCY; 19	SNM; 4	TCM; 3	MMS; 4	ROU; 4	CON; 10	MYB	HCY; 21								6th	220	
2024	Bobby Hall Motorsports	50	Chevy	SNM; 24	HCY	AAS	OCS	ACE	TCM	LGY	DOM	CRW	HCY	NWS	ACE	WCS	FLC	SBO	TCM	NWS	N/A	0	
2025	Bobby Hall Motorsports	50	Chevy	AAS	WCS	CDL	OCS	ACE	NWS	LGY	DOM	CRW	HCY	AND	FLC	SBO	TCM	NWS; 13			66th	29	
2026	Bobby Hall Motorsports	50	Chevy	SNM; 21	WCS	NSV	CRW	ACE	LGY	DOM	NWS	HCY	AND	FLC	TCM	NPS	SBO				80th	21	
