= Paul White (racing driver) =

American racing driver

- Born: April 9, 1963 (age 63); Temple, Texas
- Achievements: 2001 USAC Silver Crown champion

NASCAR FedEx Freight Truck Series career
- 6 races run over 1 year
- 2004 position: 39th
- Best finish: 39th (2004)
- First race: 2004 Black Cat Fireworks 200 (Milwaukee)
- Last race: 2004 O'Reilly 200 (Bristol)
| Wins | Top tens | Poles |
|---|---|---|
| 0 | 0 | 0 |

Paul White (born April 9, 1963) is an American former professional racing driver who competed in USAC, the NASCAR Craftsman Truck Series, and the ARCA Re/Max Series.

== Racing career ==
White won the 2001 United States Auto Club (USAC) Silver Crown championship after winning three races that season, which came at the one mile dirt races at DuQuoin and Springfield and the Copper World Classic on asphalt at Phoenix. He continued racing in the series until 2004.

Following his time in USAC, White made his debut in NASCAR in 2004, competing in six Truck Series races in the No. 13 Chevrolet Silverado for ThorSport Racing. His best finish was a 14th at Gateway. However, he finished outside the top-20 in all his other starts. Despite this, he never recorded a DNF in any of those races. Additionally, White attempted to make another start that year in the No. 77 for truck owner Dave Payton at Memphis. However, he did not qualify. If he had done so, that race would have been his Truck debut.

What lured White to try racing in NASCAR was likely the fact that he competed against some NASCAR drivers in USAC races, such as J. J. Yeley and Boston Reid. His ThorSport teammate Tracy Hines, who drove the team's No. 88 truck that year, had also raced in USAC before. When the team had an opening in their No. 13 truck after the departure of its original full-time driver for the season, Tina Gordon, Hines could have been the one to suggest to ThorSport to sign White to drive it for some races.

White's last start came in an attempt at the ARCA Re/Max Series season-opener at Daytona in 2005. White drove a part-time second car for Christi Passmore's team, the No. 92 Ford, and failed to qualify for the race, which had a large 60-car entry list. This was his only ARCA attempt.

== Motorsports career results ==
=== NASCAR ===
(key) (Bold – Pole position awarded by qualifying time. Italics – Pole position earned by points standings or practice time. * – Most laps led.)

==== Craftsman Truck Series ====
NASCAR Craftsman Truck Series results
| Year | Team | No. | Make | 1 | 2 | 3 | 4 | 5 | 6 | 7 | 8 | 9 | 10 | 11 | 12 | 13 | 14 | 15 | 16 | 17 | 18 | 19 | 20 | 21 | 22 | 23 | 24 | 25 | NCTC | Pts | Ref |
|---|---|---|---|---|---|---|---|---|---|---|---|---|---|---|---|---|---|---|---|---|---|---|---|---|---|---|---|---|---|---|---|
| 2004 | Dave Payton | 77 | Chevy | DAY | ATL | MAR | MFD | CLT | DOV | TEX | MEM; DNQ | | | | | | | | | | | | | | | | | | 39th | 516 | |
| 2004 | ThorSport Racing | 13 | Chevy | | | | | | | | | MLW; 30 | KAN | KEN; 28 | GTW; 14 | MCH | IRP; 30 | NSH; 30 | BRI; 22 | RCH | NHA | LVS | CAL | TEX | MAR | PHO | DAR | HOM | 39th | 516 | |

^{*} Season still in progress
^{1} Ineligible for series points

=== ARCA Re/Max Series ===
(key) (Bold – Pole position awarded by qualifying time. Italics – Pole position earned by points standings or practice time. * – Most laps led.)

ARCA Re/Max Series results
| Year | Team | No. | Make | 1 | 2 | 3 | 4 | 5 | 6 | 7 | 8 | 9 | 10 | 11 | 12 | 13 | 14 | 15 | 16 | 17 | 18 | 19 | 20 | 21 | 22 | 23 | ARSC | Pts | Ref |
|---|---|---|---|---|---|---|---|---|---|---|---|---|---|---|---|---|---|---|---|---|---|---|---|---|---|---|---|---|---|
| 2005 | Christi Passmore Racing | 92 | Ford | DAY; DNQ | NSH | SLM | KEN | TOL | LAN | MIL | POC | MCH | KAN | KEN | BLN | POC | GTW | LER | NSH | MCH | ISF | TOL | DSF | CHI | SLM | TAL | N/A | 0 | |
