= Ken Weaver (racing driver) =

American racing driver (born 1956)

- Born: February 10, 1956 (age 70); Dallas, Texas, U.S.

NASCAR FedEx Freight Truck Series career
- 24 races run over 3 years
- Best finish: 29th (2004)
- First race: 2003 Lucas Oil 250 (Mesa Marin)
- Last race: 2005 Dodge Ram Tough 200 (Gateway)
Wins	Top tens	Poles
0	1	0

Ken Weaver (born February 10, 1956) is an American former stock car racing driver and team owner from Dallas, Texas. He drove the No. 20 PhoneCo – Industrial Lightspeed Chevrolet in the ARCA Re/MAX Series series. He ran in NASCAR in 2004 and 2005, before returning to ARCA.

== Craftsman Truck Series career ==
Weaver has 24 career starts in the Truck Series. Running his No. 20 PhoneCo Chevy, Weaver made his debut in the 2003 race at Mesa Marin Raceway. It was a decent first race, as Weaver started 26th and finished 29th.

Those runs earned him a new ride in 2004, driving a Green Light Racing No. 08 Chevy, with funding from PhoneCo. He had a best of 18th at Texas and by midseason, Weaver was scaled back to a limited schedule.

Weaver continued to race in the trucks in 2005. This time at Daytona, he scored his first top-ten finish a 6th at Daytona. Weaver made three more races in 2005. He did not finish two of the three races, and his best finish was a 28th at Atlanta Motor Speedway.

== ARCA career ==
Weaver began racing in the ARCA Re/Max Series in 2002. In 2005 and 2006, after modest results to start his career, his performance significantly, highlighted by 15 top-tens and four second-place finishes in 2005. He drove the No. 20 PhoneCo Dodge for the 2006 season.

== Business career ==
Weaver purchased Freedom Power Electric in 2006 which provides pre-paid electricity to Texas consumers with credit problems. During August 2009, he transferred his ownership to an irrevocable trust controlled by his ex-wife after it was exposed by the Dallas Morning News that he had a criminal past that he failed to disclose on his initial application with the Texas Public Utilities Commission, a fact that could have affected his ability to purchase the regulated company. It was also discovered that while he claimed to have dual Bachelor degrees from the University of North Texas, he actually had only taken a few classes and dropped out, never obtaining a degree from any university.

== Motorsports career results ==
=== NASCAR ===
(key) (Bold – Pole position awarded by qualifying time. Italics – Pole position earned by points standings or practice time. * – Most laps led.)

==== Craftsman Truck Series ====
NASCAR Craftsman Truck Series results
Year	Team	No.	Make	1	2	3	4	5	6	7	8	9	10	11	12	13	14	15	16	17	18	19	20	21	22	23	24	25	NCTC	Pts	Ref
2003	KW Racing	20	Chevy	DAY	DAR	MMR; 26	MAR	CLT	DOV; 17	TEX	MEM	MLW; 34	KAN	KEN	GTW; 19	MCH	IRP	NSH	BRI	RCH	NHA	CAL; 15	LVS	SBO	TEX	MAR	PHO	HOM	47th	482	
2004	Green Light Racing	08	Chevy	DAY; 35	ATL	MAR; 28	MFD; 33	CLT; 23	DOV; 22	TEX; 18	MEM; 34	MLW; 31	KAN; 20	KEN; 26	GTW; 22	MCH	IRP; DNQ	NSH; 34	BRI	RCH	NHA	LVS; 29	CAL	TEX; 24	MAR	PHO; 32	DAR	HOM; DNQ	29th	1212	
2005	Green Light Racing	08	Chevy	DAY; 6	CAL; 35	ATL; 28	MAR																						51st	357	
2005	KW Racing	20	Chevy					GTY; 31	MFD	CLT	DOV	TEX	MCH	MLW	KAN	KEN	MEM	IRP	NSH	BRI	RCH	NHA	LVS	MAR	ATL	TEX	PHO	HOM	51st	357	

==== Winston West Series ====
NASCAR Winston West Series results
Year	Team	No.	Make	1	2	3	4	5	6	7	8	9	10	11	12	NWWSC	Pts	Ref
2003	Norris Racing	32	Ford	PHO; 24	LVS											37th	188	
2003	Norris Racing	32	Pontiac			CAL; 22	MAD	TCR	EVG	IRW	S99	RMR	DCS	PHO	MMR	37th	188	

=== ARCA Re/Max Series ===
(key) (Bold – Pole position awarded by qualifying time. Italics – Pole position earned by points standings or practice time. * – Most laps led.)

ARCA Re/Max Series results
Year	Team	No.	Make	1	2	3	4	5	6	7	8	9	10	11	12	13	14	15	16	17	18	19	20	21	22	23	ARMC	Pts	Ref
2003	Ken Weaver Racing	22	Pontiac	DAY	ATL	NSH	SLM	TOL	KEN	CLT; 37	BLN	KAN															38th	720	
2003	Ken Weaver Racing	96	Pontiac										MCH; 40	LER	POC	POC; 9	NSH; 13	ISF	WIN	DSF							38th	720	
2003	Ken Weaver Racing	96	Ford																		CHI; 12	SLM					38th	720	
2003	Ken Weaver Racing	96	Chevy																				TAL; 26	CLT	SBO		38th	720	
2004	Bob Schacht Motorsports	75	Chevy	DAY	NSH; 25	SLM			CLT; DNQ	KAN	POC	MCH	SBO	BLN													25th	1020	
2004	Bob Schacht Motorsports	75	Ford				KEN; 4	TOL																			25th	1020	
2004	Gibson Racing	56	Pontiac												KEN; 29												25th	1020	
2004	Bob Schacht Motorsports	75	Pontiac													GTW; DNQ	POC; 31	LER									25th	1020	
2004	Ken Weaver Racing	20	Chevy																NSH; 17	ISF	TOL				TAL; DNQ		25th	1020	
2004	Ken Weaver Racing	20	Ford																			DSF; 11					25th	1020	
2004	Ken Weaver Racing	20	Pontiac																				CHI; 23	SLM			25th	1020	
2005	Ken Weaver Racing	20	Chevy	DAY; 15		SLM; 9		TOL; 15	LAN; 26	MIL; 15			KAN; 33		BLN; 23		GTW; 11	LER; 3			ISF; 9	TOL; 5	DSF; 24	CHI; 26	SLM; 2	TAL; 14	3rd	5140	
2005	Ken Weaver Racing	20	Pontiac		NSH; 6						POC; 27	MCH; 3		KEN; 10		POC; 5			NSH; 2	MCH; 6							3rd	5140	
2005	Ken Weaver Racing	10	Pontiac				KEN; 4																				3rd	5140	
2006	Eddie Sharp Racing	20	Dodge	DAY; 6	NSH; 17	SLM; 26	WIN; 9	KEN; 35	TOL; 8	POC; 6	MCH; 6	KAN; 31	KEN; 12	BLN; 5	POC; 34	GTW; 40	NSH	MCH	ISF	MIL	TOL	DSF	CHI	SLM	TAL	IOW	21st	2335	
2009	Cunningham Motorsports	4	Dodge	DAY; 5	SLM; 20	CAR; 24	TAL; 38	KEN; 11	TOL; 28	POC	MCH	MFD	IOW	KEN	BLN	POC	ISF	CHI	TOL	DSF	NJE	SLM	KAN	CAR			33rd	975	
