= Ricky Gonzalez =

American racing driver (born 1966)

- Nationality: (United States) American
- Born: Richard Gonzalez; February 3, 1966 (age 60) South Plainfield, New Jersey, U.S.

ARCA Re/Max Series career
- Debut season: 2004
- Former teams: Wayne Peterson Racing, Richardson-Netzloff-Harmon Racing, Darrell Basham Racing
- Starts: 12
- Wins: 0
- Poles: 0
- Best finish: 25th in 2005
- Finished last season: 106th (2007)

NASCAR FedEx Freight Truck Series career
- 1 race run over 1 year
- Best finish: 98th (2004)
- First race: 2004 UAW/GM Ohio 250 (Mansfield)
Wins	Top tens	Poles
0	0	0
- Statistics up to date as of June 26, 2020.

Richard Gonzalez (born February 3, 1966) is an American former professional stock car racing driver who competed in one NASCAR Craftsman Truck Series race in 2004 and a number of ARCA Re/Max Series races from 2004 to 2007. He became the first Hispanic-American driver to compete in ARCA and NASCAR.

== Racing career ==
=== Early career and Truck Series ===
Gonzalez became interested in racing when he attended a race that his father's friend was competing in at Flemington Speedway. Gonzalez started racing motocross bikes and moved up the racing ladder, where he would then progress to racing go-karts, microstocks, and Legends cars. He then competed in the American Race Trucks Series and the (now defunct) NASCAR Goody's Dash Series. In order to have enough money to move up the ranks, Gonzalez had to sell all his equipment from the previous series he had raced in, as well as his own personal motorcycle.

Gonzalez reached the NASCAR Craftsman Truck Series in 2004 and would attempt two races for Troxell Racing in a partnership with Rick Ware Racing. Driving their No. 93 Dodge, he failed to qualify in his first attempt at Martinsville. In the next race at Mansfield, which was his other start, he did qualify for the race and finished 26th, nine laps down.

Gonzalez's next race of the year was scheduled to be in the NASCAR Busch Series' race at IRP, the Kroger 200, in August. It would have been his debut in that series. He was to drive for a team called Coqui Motorsports. This planned start did not happen, and Gonzalez would never get to make a start in the Busch Series. Coqui was a new team that had not made any Busch starts previously. Unfortunately, the team would never have the chance, after the race deal fell through. Gonzalez would not make another start in the Truck Series either, and the rest of his stock car starts came in the ARCA Re/Max Series.

=== ARCA ===
Gonzalez made his ARCA debut at Chicago in Wayne Peterson Racing's No. 06 Chevrolet, and would make one other start in that car in the next race at Salem. He crashed out of both races and would finish 27th and 26th, respectively. With these starts, Gonzalez became the first Hispanic American to start an ARCA race. In 2005, Gonzalez would run full-time and for rookie of the year with the Peterson team split between their various entries (No. 6, No. 16 and No. 06). He was not eligible to run at Daytona, so his first start of the year came in the second race of the season at Nashville, which he did not qualify for along with a staggering twelve other races. The Peterson team was underfunded and had to start and park in a large number of Gonzalez's starts. In the race at Pocono which Gonzalez was going to run the full race in, he was running in the top 10 until he suffered a broken transmission and radiator and did not finish the race. For the final two races of the season, Gonzalez fielded his own team instead. Although he had his own car and equipment, he still used Peterson's car numbers (No. 06 at Salem and No. 16 at Talladega) and owner points. Gonzalez's team partnered with Lafferty Motorsports to field his Talladega entry.

Gonzalez would not make any NASCAR or ARCA starts in 2006, but did return in 2007 in ARCA, when he attempted three races. He first returned to the Peterson team, with a DNQ in the No. 0 at Nashville. The first race in which he did qualify for was at the Milwaukee Mile, where the team got to run the full race in Darrell Basham's No. 94 car thanks to support from Richardson-Netzloff-Harmon Racing (co-owned by driver Mike Harmon, who at the time was competing in ARCA full-time). Although Gonzalez finished eight laps down, he picked up a solid 18th-place finish. He returned to the same car the following race at Gateway, which was without RNH support. Gonzalez failed to qualify the No. 94, but was given a chance to return to the Peterson No. 0 again when team owner-driver Wayne Peterson stepped out of the start and park ride for Gonzalez, who would do the same. This would end up being Gonzalez's last ARCA start.

== Personal life ==
Gonzalez is of Puerto Rican descent and was a member of NASCAR's Diversity Council when he was competing in the sport. After being born in Aguada, Puerto Rico, he moved to South Plainfield, New Jersey. In his Truck Series debut in 2004 at Martinsville, Gonzalez was sponsored by two local businesses, one of which was located in his hometown of South Plainfield and the other one was in Manville, New Jersey. When he ran full-time in ARCA in 2005, he moved from New Jersey to Mooresville, North Carolina (near where most NASCAR teams are based) with the hopes of getting a ride in the NASCAR Busch or Truck Series again, which did not end up happening.

== Motorsports career results ==
=== NASCAR ===
(key) (Bold – Pole position awarded by qualifying time. Italics – Pole position earned by points standings or practice time. * – Most laps led.)

==== Craftsman Truck Series ====
NASCAR Craftsman Truck Series results
Year	Team	No.	Make	1	2	3	4	5	6	7	8	9	10	11	12	13	14	15	16	17	18	19	20	21	22	23	24	25	NCTC	Pts	Ref
2004	Troxell Racing	93	Dodge	DAY	ATL	MAR; DNQ	MFD; 26	CLT	DOV	TEX	MEM	MLW	KAN	KEN	GTW	MCH	IRP	NSH	BRI	RCH	NHA	LVS	CAL	TEX	MAR	PHO	DAR	HOM	98th	85	

==== Goody's Dash Series ====
NASCAR Goody's Dash Series results
Year	Team	No.	Make	1	2	3	4	5	6	7	8	9	10	11	12	13	14	NGDS	Pts	Ref
2002	N/A	13	Pontiac	DAY	HAR	ROU	LON	CLT	KEN	MEM	GRE; 14	SNM	SBO	MYB	BRI	MOT; 21	ATL	45th	220	
2003	N/A	13	Pontiac	DAY; 31	OGL	CLT; DNQ	SBO	GRE	KEN	BRI	ATL; 12							38th	216	

=== ARCA Re/Max Series ===
(key) (Bold – Pole position awarded by qualifying time. Italics – Pole position earned by points standings or practice time. * – Most laps led.)

ARCA Re/Max Series results
Year	Team	No.	Make	1	2	3	4	5	6	7	8	9	10	11	12	13	14	15	16	17	18	19	20	21	22	23	ARMC	Pts	Ref
2004	Wayne Peterson Racing	06	Chevy	DAY	NSH	SLM	KEN	TOL	CLT	KAN	POC	MCH	SBO	BLN	KEN	GTW	POC	LER	NSH	ISF	TOL	DSF	CHI; 27	SLM; 26	TAL		114th	195	
2005	Wayne Peterson Racing	6	Chevy	DAY	NSH; DNQ	SLM; 32	KEN; DNQ	TOL; DNQ	LAN; DNQ			MCH; DNQ	KAN														25th	1885	
2005	Wayne Peterson Racing	16	Chevy							MIL; 34	POC; 20												DSF; 38				25th	1885	
2005	Wayne Peterson Racing	06	Chevy											KEN; DNQ	BLN; DNQ	POC; 31	GTW; 35	LER; DNQ	NSH; 38	MCH; DNQ	ISF; 33	TOL; DNQ		CHI; DNQ			25th	1885	
2005	Ricky Gonzalez	06	Chevy																						SLM; DNQ		25th	1885	
2005	Ricky Gonzalez	16	Chevy																							TAL; DNQ	25th	1885	
2007	Wayne Peterson Racing	0	Chevy	DAY	USA	NSH	SLM	KAN	WIN	KEN	TOL	IOW	POC	MCH	BLN	KEN	POC	NSH; DNQ	ISF		GTW; 38						106th	205	
2007	Richardson-Netzloff-Harmon Racing	94	Chevy																	MIL; 18							106th	205	
2007	Darrell Basham Racing	94	Chevy																		GTW; DNQ	DSF	CHI	SLM	TAL	TOL	106th	205	
