= Charlie Bradberry =

American racing driver (1982–2006)

- Born: June 28, 1982; Chelsea, Alabama, U.S.
- Died: October 7, 2006 (aged 24); Chelsea, Alabama, U.S.
- Cause of death: Automobile accident
- Achievements: 2003 Snowball Derby Winner; 2003 NASCAR Southeast Series Champion

NASCAR FedEx Freight Truck Series career
- 11 races run over 2 years
- Best finish: 45th – 2004
- First race: 2003 Advance Auto Parts 250 (Martinsville)
- Last race: 2004 Kroger 200 (Martinsville)
Wins	Top tens	Poles
0	0	0

Charlie Bradberry (June 28, 1982 – October 7, 2006) was an American NASCAR driver who ran part-time in the NASCAR Craftsman Truck Series in 2003 and 2004. His best finish was 16th at Memphis Motorsports Park in 2003. He was the brother of Gary Bradberry, who ran a number of Winston Cup races in the 1990s.

On October 7, 2006, Bradberry was killed in a one-truck accident while returning home from working on his racing vehicles. At the time of his death, his son was still in the womb. He was born Charles Tucker Bradberry on February 8, 2007.

Bradberry, a star in late model stock cars on various tracks in the Southeast, had garnered some interest among Busch Series team owners and could have run in that series in 2007, had he lived.

== Motorsports career results ==
=== NASCAR ===
(key) (Bold – Pole position awarded by qualifying time. Italics – Pole position earned by points standings or practice time. * – Most laps led.)

==== Busch Series ====
NASCAR Busch Series results
Year	Team	No.	Make	1	2	3	4	5	6	7	8	9	10	11	12	13	14	15	16	17	18	19	20	21	22	23	24	25	26	27	28	29	30	31	32	33	34	35	NBSC	Pts	Ref
2004	Gary Keller Racing	85	Chevy	DAY	CAR	LVS	DAR	BRI	TEX	NSH	TAL	CAL	GTY	RCH	NZH	CLT	DOV	NSH	KEN	MLW	DAY	CHI	NHA	PPR	IRP	MCH	BRI	CAL	RCH	DOV	KAN	CLT	MEM	ATL	PHO; DNQ	DAR	HOM		NA	-	
2005	TommyRaz Motorsports	92	Dodge	DAY	CAL	MXC	LVS	ATL	NSH	BRI	TEX	PHO	TAL	DAR	RCH	CLT	DOV	NSH	KEN	MLW	DAY	CHI	NHA	PPR	GTY	IRP	GLN	MCH	BRI	CAL	RCH	DOV	KAN	CLT	MEM; DNQ	TEX			NA	-	
2005	TommyRaz Motorsports	91	Dodge																																		PHO; DNQ	HOM	NA	-	

==== Craftsman Truck Series ====
NASCAR Craftsman Truck Series results
Year	Team	No.	Make	1	2	3	4	5	6	7	8	9	10	11	12	13	14	15	16	17	18	19	20	21	22	23	24	25	NCTC	Pts	Ref
2003	Bradberry Motorsports	78	Chevy	DAY	DAR	MMR	MAR; 30	CLT	DOV	TEX	MEM; 16	MLW	KAN	KEN	GTW	MCH	IRP; 33	NSH	BRI	RCH; 20	NHA	CAL	LVS	SBO; 24	TEX	MAR	PHO	HOM	53rd	446	
2004	Bradberry Motorsports	78	Chevy	DAY	ATL	MAR	MFD; 21	CLT; 29	DOV	TEX	MEM	MLW	KAN	KEN; 35	GTW	MCH	IRP; DNQ	NSH; 36	BRI	RCH; 34	NHA	LVS	CAL	TEX	MAR; 32	PHO	DAR	HOM	45th	417	

Achievements
Preceded by Ricky Turner	Snowball Derby Winner; 2003	Succeeded by Steve Wallace
