= Kelly Sutton =

American racing driver (born 1971)

- Born: Kelly Ranae Sutton; September 24, 1971 (age 55); Crownsville, Maryland, U.S.
- Achievements: First female Allison Legacy Series race winner (1997)
- Awards: 2007 Dorthy Corwin "Spirit of Life" Award; 2005 Trailblazer Award; 2004 Jimmy V Award; 2004 Gene Autry Courage Award; 2003 Wilma Rudolph Courage Award; 2002 NASCAR Goody's Series Most Popular Driver; 1998 Pars Pro Truck Series Oral B Close Brush Award; 1997 Allison Legacy Pennsylvania Series Most Popular Driver; 1992–1994 Old Dominion Speedway Most Popular Driver; 1993 Metropolitan Auto Racing Fan Club Of Maryland, Delaware and Virginia Award; 1992 Old Dominion Speedway Hard Charger Award; 1992 Old Dominion Speedway Sportsmanship Award

NASCAR FedEx Freight Truck Series career
- 54 races run over 5 years
- Best finish: 26th (2004)
- First race: 2003 O'Reilly 200 (Memphis)
- Last race: 2007 Toyota Tundra Milwaukee 200 (Milwaukee)
Wins	Top tens	Poles
0	0	0
- Statistics up to date as of May 22, 2010.

Kelly Renae "Girl" Sutton (born September 24, 1971) is an American former NASCAR driver. Sutton started 54 races, mostly in her family-owned No. 02 Chevrolet Silverado, in the Craftsman Truck Series. She was the only stock-car racer, male or female, known to race with multiple sclerosis before Trevor Bayne's diagnosis in 2013.

== Beginnings ==
Sutton began racing at the age of ten before her career was halted due to her diagnosis of MS at the age of sixteen. She resumed racing in 1992 at Old Dominion Speedway, driving in the Pro Mini Stock Series. During her first year of competition, Sutton won the Hard Charger and Sportsmanship awards. During her three years competing in the series, she won seven feature races and won the Most Popular Driver award all three years.

== Return to racing ==
Sutton would not race again until 1997 in the Allison Pennsylvania Legacy Series. She won two feature races and the Most Popular Driver Award. The next year, she competed in the Parts Pro Truck Series, where she won one qualifying race and the Oral B Close Brush Award.

In 2000, Sutton advanced to the NASCAR Dash Series, where she competed in two races and had a sixteenth-place finish. She posted her first top-ten in the division the following year, before competing full-time in 2002, winning the Most Popular Driver award and finishing third in rookie standings.

== Craftsman Truck Series ==
Sutton made her NASCAR Craftsman Truck Series debut in 2003 at Memphis Motorsports Park, where she started 34th and finished 27th after suffering early transmission failure. She ran three more races that year, her best finish being a 19th at the season-ending Ford 200. She made her first full-time bid for the championship in 2004, with sponsorship from Copaxone. She finished seventh for NASCAR Rookie of the Year honors and 26th in championship points, her best points finish to date. Her best finish that season came at Mansfield Motorsports Speedway, where she finished 20th. She returned in 2005, posting a career-best fifteenth-place run at the Quaker Steak and Lube 200, despite dropping to 29th in points. She had a big accident at Kansas during the season when she went upside down in turns 3 and 4 during the O'Reilly 250 after contact with Chris Fontaine, who had wrecked in front of her earlier.

In 2006, she competed in twelve races. During the O'Reilly 250 at Kansas, the same race she flipped in a year earlier, she had another bad accident, this time losing control of her truck on the backstretch and just missing an opening on the inside wall before slamming into the wall, almost flattening the driver's side of the truck. She was extracted from the truck to a local hospital, but she survived with minor injuries. Fellow NASCAR driver Jeff Fuller would have an accident almost similar to this later in the year in a Busch series race at Kentucky when he spun to avoid a spinning Jason Leffler and slammed into an opening on the inside wall, only it was the passenger side door that was flattened, and he survived with minor injuries. Brad Keselowski was hired to drive in two races that her team was entered in, but that she could not race in due to her injury. Her best finish was a nineteenth at Gateway International Raceway.

For 2007, Sutton drove three races in the No. 51 truck for Billy Ballew Motorsports. In June 2007, Sutton finished 20th at the Toyota Tundra Milwaukee 200, her last race to date.

== Motorcycle accident ==
On Sunday, April 7, 2013, Sutton was severely injured in a motorcycle accident while riding as a passenger. The person she was riding with died. She was taken to an area hospital in critical condition.

== Motorsports career results ==
=== NASCAR ===
(key) (Bold – Pole position awarded by qualifying time. Italics – Pole position earned by points standings or practice time. * – Most laps led.)

==== Craftsman Truck Series ====
NASCAR Craftsman Truck Series results
Year	Team	No.	Make	1	2	3	4	5	6	7	8	9	10	11	12	13	14	15	16	17	18	19	20	21	22	23	24	25	NCTC	Pts	Ref
2003	Sutton Motorsports	02	Chevy	DAY	DAR	MMR	MAR	CLT	DOV	TEX	MEM; 27	MLW	KAN	KEN	GTW	MCH	IRP	NSH	BRI	RCH	NHA; 23	CAL	LVS; DNQ	SBO	TEX	MAR	PHO; 35	HOM; 19	63rd	340	
2004	Sutton Motorsports	02	Chevy	DAY; DNQ	ATL; 32	MAR; DNQ	MFD; 20	CLT; DNQ	DOV; 27	TEX; 30	MEM; 31	MLW; 25	KAN; 35	KEN; 23	GTW; 21	MCH; 25	IRP; DNQ	NSH; 28	BRI; DNQ	RCH; DNQ	NHA; 24	LVS; 35	CAL; 25	TEX; 35	MAR; 34	PHO; 35	DAR; 36	HOM; 34	26th	1432	
2005	Sutton Motorsports	02	Chevy	DAY; 17	CAL; 26	ATL; 31	MAR; 27	GTY; 28	MFD; 26	CLT; 15	DOV; 31	TEX; 29	MCH; DNQ	MLW; DNQ	KAN; 31	KEN; 26	MEM; 20	IRP; 31	NSH; 36	BRI; DNQ	RCH; DNQ	NHA; 29	LVS; 28	MAR; DNQ	ATL; DNQ	TEX; DNQ	PHO; DNQ	HOM; DNQ	29th	1315	
2006	Sutton Motorsports	02	Chevy	DAY; 29	CAL; 28	ATL; QL^{†}	MAR	GTY; 19	CLT; 27	MFD; 21	DOV; 36	TEX; 24	MCH; 25	MLW; 32	KAN; 36	KEN	MEM	IRP; 25	NSH; 26	BRI	NHA	LVS	TAL	MAR	ATL	TEX	PHO	HOM	34th	977	
2007	Billy Ballew Motorsports	51	Chevy	DAY	CAL	ATL	MAR	KAN; 33	CLT	MFD; DNQ	DOV	TEX; 33	MCH	MLW; 20	MEM	KEN	IRP	NSH	BRI	GTW	NHA	LVS	TAL	MAR	ATL	TEX	PHO	HOM	66th	231	
^{†} - Qualified but replaced by Chad Chaffin.

==== Goody's Dash Series ====
NASCAR Goody's Dash Series results
Year	Team	No.	Make	1	2	3	4	5	6	7	8	9	10	11	12	13	14	15	16	17	18	19	NGDS	Pts	Ref
1995	N/A	02	Pontiac	DAY	FLO	LAN	MYB	SUM	HCY	CAR	STH; 21	BRI	SUM	GRE	BGS	MYB	NSV	FLO	NWS	VOL	HCY	HOM	N/A	0	
2000	N/A	02	Pontiac	DAY; DNQ	MON	STA	JAC	CAR	CLT; DNQ	SBO	ROU	LOU	SUM	GRE	SNM	MYB; 26	BRI	HCY	JAC	USA; 16	LAN		46th	229	
2001	N/A	02	Pontiac	DAY; 21	ROU; 10	DAR	CLT; 29	LOU	JAC	KEN	SBO	DAY; 27	GRE	SNM; 12	NRV	MYB	BRI	ACE	JAC	USA; 14	NSH		32nd	640	
2002	N/A	02	Pontiac	DAY; 11	HAR; 21	ROU; 22	LON; 19	CLT; 17	KEN; 11	MEM; 9	GRE; 18	SNM; 22	SBO; 20	MYB; 22	BRI; 12	MOT; 14	ATL; 15						12th	1585	
2003	N/A	02	Pontiac	DAY; 17	OGL; 11	CLT; 19	SBO; 10	GRE; 10	KEN; 10	BRI; 15	ATL; 22												8th	965	
