= Bang! Racing =

Former NASCAR team

BANG Racing
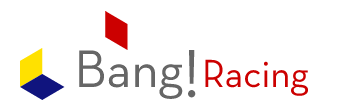
- Owner(s): Alex Meshkin, Larry McReynolds, George Blacker
- Base: Mooresville, North Carolina
- Series: Craftsman Truck Series
- Race drivers: Travis Kvapil, Mike Skinner
- Manufacturer: Toyota
- Opened: 2003
- Closed: 2005

Career
- Drivers' Championships: 0
- Race victories: 2

Bang! Racing is a former NASCAR team. It was majority owned by entrepreneur Alex Meshkin, and minority owned by both crew chief and analyst Larry McReynolds and its 'hands off' seed investor George Blacker, LTD- each with a 5% minority equity share. Bang! Racing fielded entries in the NASCAR Craftsman Truck Series. It only ran one full season, in 2004.

== History ==
=== Truck No. 24/42 history ===
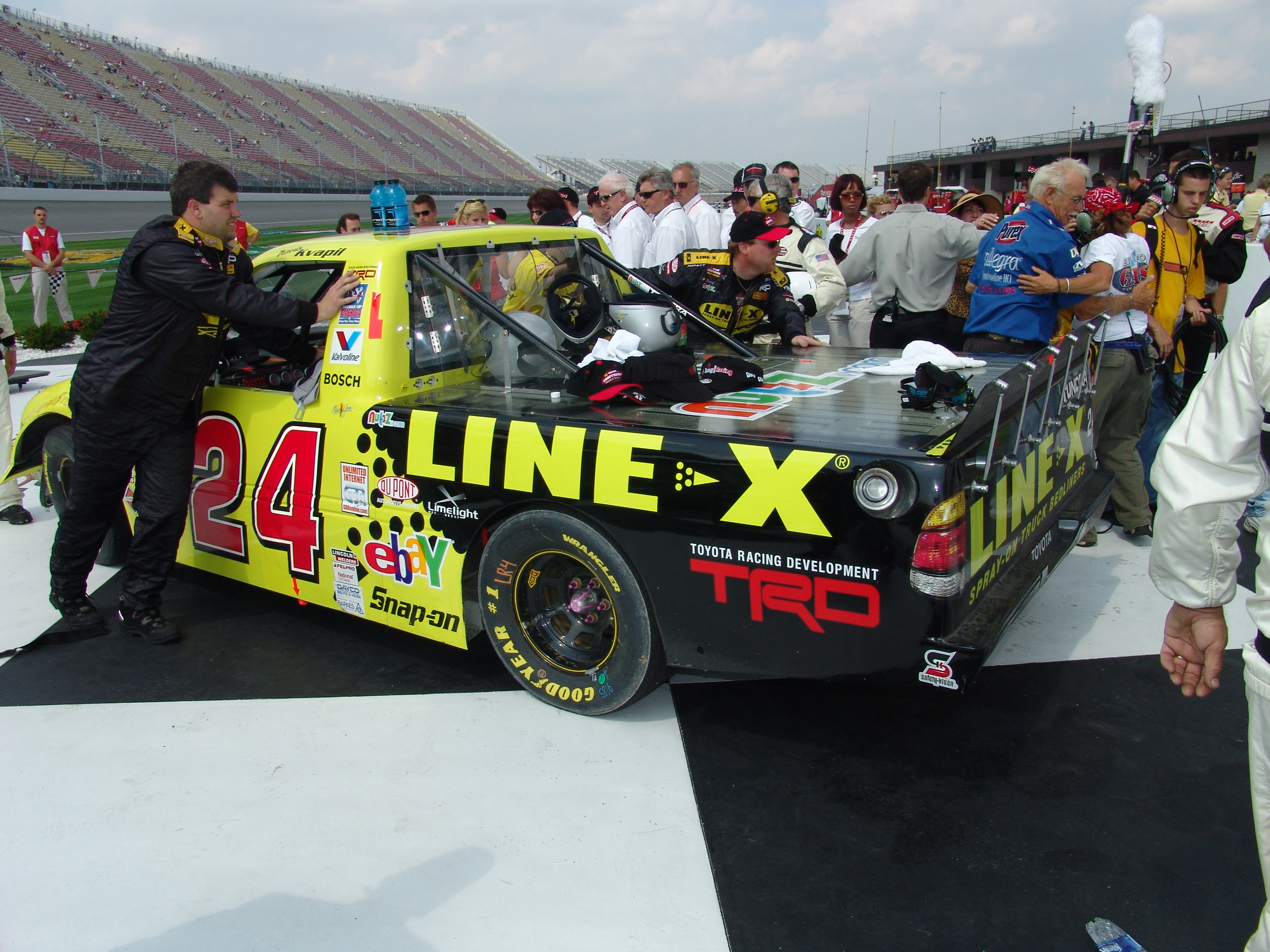
Travis Kvapil's No. 24 truck after winning the team's first race

The team was founded in 2003 by Alex Meshkin, an internet entrepreneur who had achieved notoriety by losing more than $3 million of investors' money in his failed Surfbuzz.com venture. Initially planning to race in the then-Winston Cup Series by purchasing Andy Petree Racing, the team instead signed a three-year contract with manufacturer Toyota to run in the Craftsman Truck Series as one of four new and independent of Toyota race teams to utilize Toyota Tundra's for Toyota's debut into NASCAR. Meshkin also recruited Larry McReynolds as a part-owner and vice president and he received $400,000 of seed money from investor George Blacker's investor group which was used to procure a racing shop which was a contingent requirement dictated by Toyota in order to be granted a Toyota race team contract. Accordingly, the team then leased operating race shop space from veteran driver Jimmy Spencer. The team was named after one of Meshkin's companies, Bang Technology Software.

The team made its debut at a Daytona International Speedway race in February 2004. Its two drivers were Travis Kvapil in the No. 24 Line-X Truck and Mike Skinner in the No. 42 Toyota Truck. It marked the first time in series history two former champions raced for the same operation. By lap 15 of the race, both Bang! Racing drivers had already led the race. Kvapil finished second in the race, while Skinner finished 28th due to a crash. Bang! also announced plans to run several late-season Cup Series races, with sponsorship from eBay. From then on, Bang! lived up to its namesake, with Kvapil racking up two victories, including the first NASCAR win for a Toyota at Michigan, earning one "fast time" qualifier pole, and finished in eighth-place in season points. Skinner, despite not winning a race, had two poles during his tenure with the team. Meshkin meanwhile was credited for his salesmanship abilities, as he recruited sponsors such as Line-X and eBay. Later in the year Meshkin announced he would field the No. 82 Dodge in the Busch Series in 2005, with Kvapil at the wheel. He also began negotiations for a potential NEXTEL Cup Series team (the No. 28 Dodge) with driver Ward Burton and NetZero sponsoring; both were with Haas CNC Racing at the time. The Cup Series deal ultimately fell through.

However, trouble soon began brewing within the organization. Despite the team's success, McReynolds left the team in July due to funding and financial disagreements with Meshkin, including unpaid bills to suppliers. In August, Toyota ended its factory support of the team due to the departure of McReynolds, with the No. 42 team shutting down and driver Mike Skinner moving to Bill Davis Racing. Toyota later maintained its agreement until the end of the season which saw Bang! Racing end that season as the first race team to both lead a lap and win a race for Toyota Racing in a major NASCAR series. But after the season, several key executives at Bang resigned, and in January 2005, Bang let all of its help go and closed down its shop. Blacker wrote off his Bang! Racing seed investment money as a complete loss.

==== Truck No. 24 results ====
| Year | Driver | No. | Make | 1 | 2 | 3 | 4 | 5 | 6 | 7 | 8 | 9 | 10 | 11 | 12 | 13 | 14 | 15 | 16 | 17 | 18 | 19 | 20 | 21 | 22 | 23 | 24 | 25 | Owners | Pts |
|---|---|---|---|---|---|---|---|---|---|---|---|---|---|---|---|---|---|---|---|---|---|---|---|---|---|---|---|---|---|---|
| 2004 | Travis Kvapil | 24 | Toyota | DAY; 2 | ATL; 4 | MAR; 13 | MFD; 32 | CLT; 8 | DOV; 16 | TEX; 27 | MEM; 13 | MLW; 5 | KAN; 7 | KEN; 15 | GTW; 7 | MCH; 1 | IRP; 4 | NSH; 13 | BRI; 8 | RCH; 31 | NHA; 1 | LVS; 28 | CAL; 18 | TEX; 23 | MAR; 21 | PHO; 15 | DAR; 19 | HOM; 19 | 8th | 3152 |

==== Truck No. 42 results ====
| Year | Driver | No. | Make | 1 | 2 | 3 | 4 | 5 | 6 | 7 | 8 | 9 | 10 | 11 | 12 | 13 | 14 | 15 | 16 | 17 | 18 | 19 | 20 | 21 | 22 | 23 | 24 | 25 | Owners | Pts |
|---|---|---|---|---|---|---|---|---|---|---|---|---|---|---|---|---|---|---|---|---|---|---|---|---|---|---|---|---|---|---|
| 2004 | Mike Skinner | 42 | Toyota | DAY; 28 | ATL; 2* | MAR; 5 | MFD; 11 | CLT; 15 | DOV; 4* | TEX; 11 | MEM; 26 | MLW; 29 | KAN; 12 | KEN; 18 | GTW; 28 | MCH; 3 | IRP; 13 | NSH; 10 | BRI; 23* | RCH; 10 | NHA; 10 | LVS | CAL | TEX | MAR | PHO | DAR | HOM | 12th | 3037 |
