= 2004 NASCAR Craftsman Truck Series =

American motorsport season

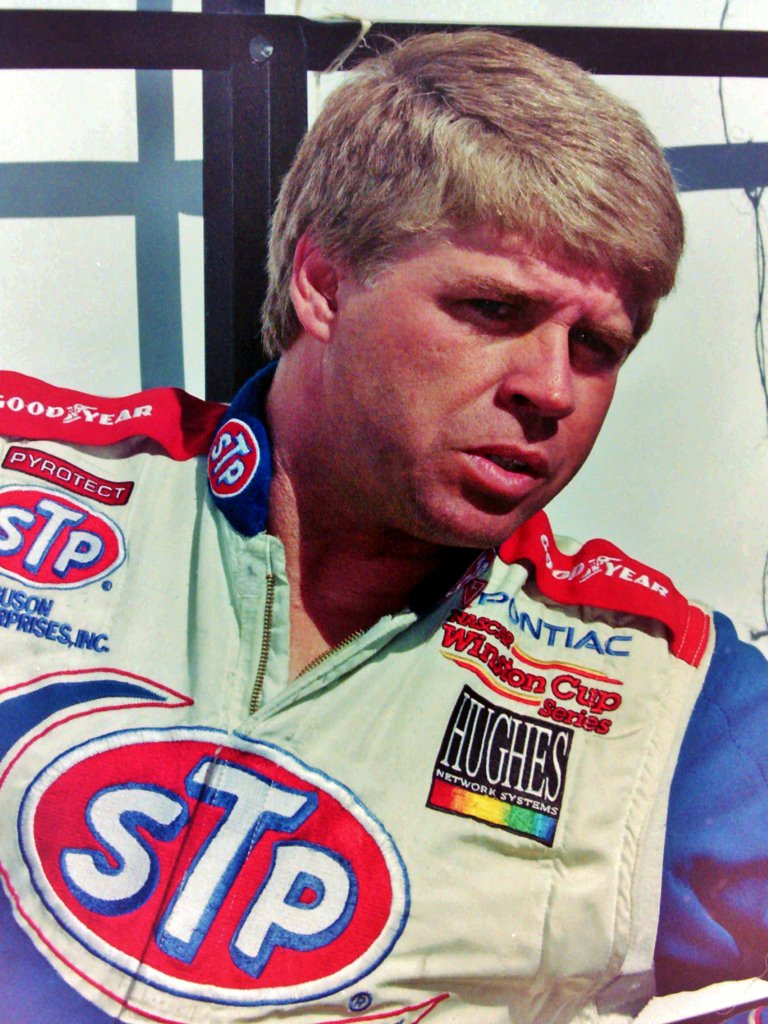
Bobby Hamilton, the 2004 Craftsman Truck Series champion.

The 2004 NASCAR Craftsman Truck Series was the tenth season of the Craftsman Truck Series, the third highest stock car racing series sanctioned by NASCAR in the United States. Bobby Hamilton of Bobby Hamilton Racing won the championship, giving Dodge its first Trucks Series championship.

== 2004 teams and drivers ==
=== Full-time teams ===
Manufacturer	Team	No.	Driver(s)	Crew chief
Chevrolet	Billy Ballew Motorsports	15	Shane Hmiel	Richie Wauters
Chevrolet	Green Light Racing with KW Racing	07	Shane Sieg (R) 19	Doug Howe 23; Greg Tester 2
Chevrolet	Green Light Racing with KW Racing	07	Johnny Chapman 1	Doug Howe 23; Greg Tester 2
Chevrolet	Green Light Racing with KW Racing	07	Andy Houston 2	Doug Howe 23; Greg Tester 2
Chevrolet	Green Light Racing with KW Racing	07	Sean Murphy 3	Doug Howe 23; Greg Tester 2
Chevrolet	Green Light Racing with KW Racing	08	Ken Weaver (R) 17	Tommy Morgan 18; Bobby Dotter 1 Jerry Cook 5
Chevrolet	Green Light Racing with KW Racing	08	Tony Raines 1	Tommy Morgan 18; Bobby Dotter 1 Jerry Cook 5
Chevrolet	Green Light Racing with KW Racing	08	Johnny Chapman 1	Tommy Morgan 18; Bobby Dotter 1 Jerry Cook 5
Chevrolet	Green Light Racing with KW Racing	08	A. J. Fike 1	Tommy Morgan 18; Bobby Dotter 1 Jerry Cook 5
Chevrolet	Green Light Racing with KW Racing	08	Bobby Dotter 2	Tommy Morgan 18; Bobby Dotter 1 Jerry Cook 5
Chevrolet	Green Light Racing with KW Racing	08	Bill Manfull 1	Tommy Morgan 18; Bobby Dotter 1 Jerry Cook 5
Chevrolet	Green Light Racing with KW Racing	08	Sean Murphy 1	Tommy Morgan 18; Bobby Dotter 1 Jerry Cook 5
Chevrolet	Green Light Racing with KW Racing	08	Butch Miller 1	Deon Deneau
Chevrolet	Kevin Harvick, Inc.	6	Matt Crafton	Wally Rogers
Chevrolet	Morgan-Dollar Motorsports	46	Dennis Setzer	Danny Gill
Chevrolet	Spears Motorsports	75	David Starr	Dave McCarty
Chevrolet	Sutton Motorsports	02	Kelly Sutton (R)	Tim Shutt
Chevrolet	ThorSport Racing	13	Tina Gordon 5	Jerry Cook 11; Lance Hooper 10; Bud Haefele 4
Chevrolet	ThorSport Racing	13	Lance Hooper 5	Jerry Cook 11; Lance Hooper 10; Bud Haefele 4
Chevrolet	ThorSport Racing	13	Paul White 6	Jerry Cook 11; Lance Hooper 10; Bud Haefele 4
Chevrolet	ThorSport Racing	13	Jimmy Spencer 1	Jerry Cook 11; Lance Hooper 10; Bud Haefele 4
Chevrolet	ThorSport Racing	13	Rick Bogart 1	Jerry Cook 11; Lance Hooper 10; Bud Haefele 4
Chevrolet	ThorSport Racing	13	Jason Small 4	Jerry Cook 11; Lance Hooper 10; Bud Haefele 4
Chevrolet	ThorSport Racing	13	Andy Houston 2	Jerry Cook 11; Lance Hooper 10; Bud Haefele 4
Chevrolet	ThorSport Racing	88	Tracy Hines (R)	Tim Kohuth 11; Jerry Cook 8 Bud Haefele 1 Dennis Connor 5
Chevrolet	Xpress Motorsports	16	Jack Sprague	Chris Showalter
Dodge	Bobby Hamilton Racing	4	Bobby Hamilton	Danny Rollins
Dodge	Bobby Hamilton Racing	8	Chase Montgomery (R)	Randy Seals
Dodge	Bobby Hamilton Racing	18	Chad Chaffin	Kip McCord
Dodge	Orleans Racing	62	Steve Park	Johnny Allen 4 Charlie Wilson 21
Dodge	Ultra Motorsports	1	Ted Musgrave	Gene Nead
Dodge	Ultra Motorsports	2	Andy Houston 15	Tripp Bruce
Dodge	Ultra Motorsports	2	Jimmy Spencer 1	Tripp Bruce
Dodge	Ultra Motorsports	2	Jamie McMurray 3	Tripp Bruce
Dodge	Ultra Motorsports	2	Brandon Miller 1	Tripp Bruce
Dodge	Ultra Motorsports	2	P. J. Jones 2	Tripp Bruce
Dodge	Ultra Motorsports	2	Chad Blount 1	Tripp Bruce
Dodge	Ultra Motorsports	2	Kasey Kahne 2	Tripp Bruce
Ford	Circle Bar Racing	14	Rick Crawford	Craig Huartson 15; Todd Myers 5 Ronnie White 5
Ford	Clean Line Motorsports	38	Brandon Whitt (R)	Jerry Pitts 17; Richie Letendre 5 Jamie Jones 3
Ford	Fiddleback Racing	67	Steadman Marlin 2	Gary Showalter
Ford	Fiddleback Racing	67	Kevin Love 6	Gary Showalter
Ford	Fiddleback Racing	67	Todd Bodine 1	Gary Showalter
Ford	Fiddleback Racing	67	David Ragan 10	Gary Showalter
Ford	Fiddleback Racing	67	J. R. Patton 6	Gary Showalter
Ford	K Automotive Racing	29	Frank Kimmel 3	Bob Keselowski
Ford	K Automotive Racing	29	Brad Keselowski 8	Bob Keselowski
Ford	K Automotive Racing	29	Deborah Renshaw 14	Bob Keselowski
Ford	ppc Racing	10	Terry Cook	Fred Wanke 11; Jamie Jones 11; Wes Ward 3
Ford	Roush Racing	50	Jon Wood	John Monsam 12; Tony Price 13
Ford	Roush Racing	99	Carl Edwards	Kevin Starland
Toyota	Bang! Racing	24	Travis Kvapil	Eric Phillips 23; Rick Ren 2
Toyota	Bang! Racing 18; Bill Davis Racing 7	42; 5	Mike Skinner	Rick Ren 10; Eric Phillips 2 John Monsam 12
Toyota	Bill Davis Racing	22	Bill Lester	Jeff Hensley
Toyota	Darrell Waltrip Motorsports	17	David Reutimann (R)	Jason Overstreet
Toyota	Innovative Motorsports	12	Robert Huffman (R)	Rick Gay
Toyota	Innovative Motorsports	21	Hank Parker Jr.	Wesley Sherrill 13; Gere Kennon Jr. 12

=== Part-time teams ===
Note: If under "team", the owner's name is listed and in italics, that means the name of the race team that fielded the truck is unknown.

Manufacturer	Team	No.	Driver(s)	Crew chief	Rounds
Chevrolet	Andy Petree Racing	33	Andy Petree	???	1
Chevrolet	Andy Petree Racing	33	Michael Waltrip	Andy Petree	1
Chevrolet	Bradberry Motorsports	78	Charlie Bradberry	Ted Kennedy	7
Chevrolet	Darren Shaw	04	Darren Shaw	Mark Eheler	2
Chevrolet	Dave Payton	77	Paul White	???	1
Chevrolet	David Froelich Sr.	57	David Froelich Jr.	???	3
Chevrolet	FDNY Racing	28	L. W. Miller	Dick Rahilly	2
Chevrolet	FDNY Racing	28	Buddy Davis	Dick Rahilly	1
Chevrolet	Grape Racing	35	Blake Mallory	Sparky Grape	1
Chevrolet	Groove Motorsports	30	Sean Murphy	Greg Tester	2
Chevrolet	Hands-On Racing	94	Dennis Hannel	???	1
Chevrolet	Jeff Vaughn	00	Eric King	Jeff Vaughn	1
Chevrolet	Ken Schrader Racing	52	Mike Wallace	Kevin Buskirk 5 Donnie Richeson 8	1
Chevrolet	Ken Schrader Racing	52	Ken Schrader	Kevin Buskirk 5 Donnie Richeson 8	12
Chevrolet	Key Motorsports	40	Joey Clanton	Freddie Faulk	2
Chevrolet	Key Motorsports	40	Tony Raines	Freddie Faulk	2
Chevrolet	KW Racing with SS-Green Light Racing	20	Johnny Chapman	Bobby Dotter	2
Chevrolet	KW Racing with SS-Green Light Racing	20	Andy Houston	Bobby Dotter	1
Chevrolet	KW Racing with SS-Green Light Racing	20	Bobby Dotter	Deon Deneau	1
Chevrolet	KW Racing with SS-Green Light Racing	20	Butch Miller	Deon Deneau	1
Chevrolet	KW Racing with SS-Green Light Racing	20	Davin Scites	Butch Miller	1
Chevrolet	Kevin Harvick, Inc.	92	Kevin Harvick	Ed Berrier	2
Chevrolet	Lafferty Motorsports	89	Greg Pope	Brandon Pope	1
Chevrolet	MacDonald Motorsports	72	Randy MacDonald	Michael Dokken	1
Chevrolet	MacDonald Motorsports	72	Jerry Hill	Michael Dokken	2
Chevrolet	MacDonald Motorsports	72	Teri MacDonald	Michael Dokken	2
Chevrolet	MacDonald Motorsports	72	Ryck Sanders	Michael Dokken	2
Chevrolet	McGlynn Racing	00	Ryan McGlynn	Dom Turse	1
Chevrolet	Morgan-Dollar Motorsports	47	Michael Waltrip	Randy Goss	1
Chevrolet	Morgan-Dollar Motorsports	47	J. J. Yeley	Randy Goss	1
Chevrolet	Morgan-Dollar Motorsports	47	Kyle Busch	Randy Goss	1
Chevrolet	Morgan-Dollar Motorsports	47	Robby Gordon	Randy Goss	1
Chevrolet	Morgan-Dollar Motorsports	47	Tony Stewart	Randy Goss	1
Chevrolet	Morgan-Dollar Motorsports	47	Ricky Craven	Randy Goss	1
Chevrolet	Morgan-Dollar Motorsports	47	Bobby Labonte	Randy Goss	2
Chevrolet	Morgan-Dollar Motorsports	47	Ron Hornaday Jr.	Randy Goss	1
Chevrolet	Morgan-Dollar Motorsports	47	Jason Leffler	Randy Goss	1
Chevrolet	RAW Racing	27	Eric McClure	Tim Weiss	1
Chevrolet	RAW Racing	72	Dana White	Unknown 3 Danny Axe 1 Cliff Button 1	2
Chevrolet	RAW Racing	72	Eric McClure	Unknown 3 Danny Axe 1 Cliff Button 1	1
Chevrolet	RAW Racing	72	Brad Teague	Unknown 3 Danny Axe 1 Cliff Button 1	2
Chevrolet	Richard Hampton	19	Richard Hampton	???	2
Chevrolet	Scott Eiklor	97	Scotty Sands	Jimmy Edlin	2
Chevrolet	Scott Racing, Inc.	98	Jarod Robie	???	1
Chevrolet	Stellar Quest Racing	91	J. C. Stout	Steve Mollnow	3
Chevrolet	Tam Topham	70	Tam Topham	Ed Berrier	1
Chevrolet	Team Chick Motorsports	74	Eric Jones	??? 2 Steve Chick Jr. 2 Freddy Fryar 2	6
Chevrolet	Team EJP Racing	03	Geoff Bodine	Steve May	5
Chevrolet	Team EJP Racing	03	Denny Hamlin	Steve May	5
Chevrolet	Team EJP Racing	03	Jeff Jefferson	Steve May	1
Chevrolet	Team Racing	25	Phil Bonifield	William Kehrer	5
Dodge	Bobby Hamilton Racing	04	Bobby Hamilton Jr.	Harold Holly	1
Dodge	Bobby Hamilton Racing	04	Sammy Sanders	Bobby Riddle	1
Dodge	Brevak Racing	31	Joe Aramendia	Kevin Cram	3
Dodge	Brevak Racing	31	Tim Schendel	Kevin Cram	2
Dodge	DCCS Motorsports	55	Casey Kingsland	Tom Powers	1
Dodge	HT Motorsports	59	Randy LaJoie	Greg Conner	6
Dodge	HT Motorsports	59	Mark McFarland (R)	Greg Conner	8
Dodge	HT Motorsports	59	Andy Houston	Greg Conner	4
Dodge	HT Motorsports	59	Todd Bodine	Greg Conner	1
Dodge	HT Motorsports	59	Sammy Sanders (Note: Entries were fielded in a collaboration with Bobby Hamilton Racing.)	Chris Atwood	1
Dodge	HT Motorsports	59	Bobby Hamilton Jr.	Sammy Sanders 3 Jim Horton 1	2
Dodge	HT Motorsports	59	Scott Lynch	Sammy Sanders 3 Jim Horton 1	2
Dodge	Orleans Racing	61	Scott Lynch	Robert Strmiska	1
Dodge	Phoenix Racing	09	Jimmy Spencer	Marc Reno	1
Dodge	Ron Rhodes Racing	48	Greg Sacks	James Hylton	3
Dodge	Ron Rhodes Racing	48	Wayne Edwards	James Hylton	1
Dodge	Ron Rhodes Racing	48	Kevin Dowler	James Hylton	1
Dodge	Ron Rhodes Racing	48	Derrike Cope	James Hylton	3
Dodge	Ron Rhodes Racing	48	Jeff Jefferson	James Hylton	1
Dodge	Ron Rhodes Racing	48	Geoff Bodine	James Hylton	1
Dodge	Ron Rhodes Racing	48	Nick Tucker	James Hylton	3
Dodge	Ron Rhodes Racing	48	James Hylton	???	1
Dodge	Ultra Motorsports	7	Eric Norris	Matt Puccia	2
Dodge	Welz Racing	77	James Hylton	Paul Carman	1
Dodge	Welz Racing	77	Wayne Edwards	Paul Carman	1
Ford	Capital City Motorsports	83	Randy van Zant	???	1
Ford	Circle Bar Racing	44	Greg Biffle	Ray Stonkus	1
Ford	Craig Wood	73	Craig Wood	Tony Oscar	5
Ford	Crazy Horse Racing	05	Chris Winter	Pete Epple 1 Mark Diehl 1	2
Ford	Fiddleback Racing	66	David Ragan	???	1
Ford	Fiddleback Racing	66	J. R. Patton	???	1
Ford	Four-Tech Racing	41	Danny Bagwell	Ray Paprota 2 Joe Smith 1	3
Ford	H.R.A. Racing	77	Jimmy Mullins	Gene Allnut	1
Ford	Long Brothers Racing	84	Jamey Caudill	Charlie Long	2
Ford	MB Motorsports	26	Patrick Lawson	Steve Chick Jr.	1
Ford	MB Motorsports	63	Chris Wimmer	Mike Mittler	15
Ford	MB Motorsports	63	Brad Keselowski	Joe Rhyne	1
Ford	Paul Brown	90	Brad Teague	J. J. Porter	1
Ford	Stephen Smith	74	Jim Walker	Freddy Fryar	3
Ford	Upshaw Racing	95	Travis Powell	Bill Shaw	1
Toyota	Bill Davis Racing	23	Shelby Howard (R)	Greg Ely	8
Toyota	Bill Davis Racing	23	Dave Blaney	Greg Ely	1
Toyota	Bill Davis Racing	23	Johnny Benson Jr.	Greg Ely	13
Toyota	Darrell Waltrip Motorsports	11	Darrell Waltrip	Jeff Hammond1; Todd Holbert2	3
Toyota	Germain Racing	30	Todd Bodine	Mike Hillman Jr.	9
Toyota	Hattori Racing Enterprises	01	Shigeaki Hattori	Todd Holbert	1
Chevrolet Dodge	Richardson Motorsports	0	Loni Richardson	Steve Hartz	10
Chevrolet Dodge	Richardson Motorsports	0	Wayne Edwards	Steve Hartz	2
Chevrolet Dodge	Richardson Motorsports	0	Dennis Hannel	Steve Hartz	1
Chevrolet Dodge	Richardson Motorsports	0	Kyle Beattie	Steve Hartz	1
Chevrolet Ford	Edge Performance Group	43	Johnny Sauter	Joe Shear Jr.	3
Chevrolet Ford	Edge Performance Group	43	Jim Sauter	Joe Shear Jr.	1
Chevrolet Ford	Edge Performance Group	43	Josh Richeson	John Bailey	1
Chevrolet Ford	Edge Performance Group	43	Tim Schendel	Johnny Sauter	1
Chevrolet Ford	MRD Motorsports	06	Derrick Kelley	Bryan Berry	1
Chevrolet Ford	MRD Motorsports	06	Erik Darnell	Bryan Berry	1
Chevrolet Ford	MRD Motorsports	06	Jay Sauter	Bryan Berry	6
Chevrolet Ford	MRD Motorsports	06	Regan Smith	Bryan Berry	1
Chevrolet Dodge Ford	Troxell Racing	93	Wayne Edwards	Steve Kuykendall 2 Lonnie Troxell 1	3
Chevrolet Dodge Ford	Troxell Racing	93	Ricky Gonzalez		2
Chevrolet Dodge Ford	Troxell Racing	93	Robbie Ferguson	Randy Anderson	1

== Schedule ==
No.	Race title	Track	Date
1	Florida Dodge Dealers 250	Daytona International Speedway, Daytona Beach	February 13
2	Easycare Vehicle Contracts 200	Atlanta Motor Speedway, Hampton	March 13
3	Kroger 250	Martinsville Speedway, Ridgeway	April 17
4	UAW/GM Ohio 250	Mansfield Motorsports Speedway, Mansfield	May 16
5	Infineon 200	Lowe's Motor Speedway, Concord	May 21
6	MBNA America 200	Dover International Speedway, Dover	June 4
7	O'Reilly 400K	Texas Motor Speedway, Fort Worth	June 11
8	O'Reilly 200	Memphis International Raceway, Millington	June 19
9	Black Cat Fireworks 200	The Milwaukee Mile, West Allis	June 25
10	O'Reilly Auto Parts 250	Kansas Speedway, Kansas City	July 3
11	Built Ford Tough 225	Kentucky Speedway, Sparta	July 10
12	Missouri-Illinois Dodge Dealers Ram Tough 200	Gateway International Raceway, Madison	July 17
13	Line-X Spray-On Truck Bedliners 200	Michigan International Speedway, Brooklyn	July 31
14	Power Stroke Diesel 200	Indianapolis Raceway Park, Brownsburg	August 6
15	Toyota Tundra 200	Nashville Superspeedway, Lebanon	August 14
16	O'Reilly 200 presented by Valvoline Maxlife	Bristol Motor Speedway, Bristol	August 25
17	Kroger 200	Richmond International Raceway, Richmond	September 9
18	Sylvania 200	New Hampshire International Speedway, Loudon	September 18
19	Las Vegas 350	Las Vegas Motor Speedway, Las Vegas	September 25
20	American Racing Wheels 200	California Speedway, Fontana	October 2
21	Silverado 350K	Texas Motor Speedway, Fort Worth	October 16
22	Kroger 200	Martinsville Speedway, Ridgeway	October 23
23	Chevy Silverado 150	Phoenix International Raceway, Phoenix	November 5
24	Darlington 200	Darlington Raceway, Darlington	November 13
25	Ford 200	Homestead–Miami Speedway, Homestead	November 19

== Races ==
=== Florida Dodge Dealers 250 ===
The Florida Dodge Dealers 250 was held February 13 at Daytona International Speedway. Terry Cook won the pole.

Top ten results

1. #99 - Carl Edwards
2. #24 - Travis Kvapil
3. #52 - Mike Wallace
4. #14 - Rick Crawford
5. #10 - Terry Cook
6. #46 - Dennis Setzer
7. #50 - Jon Wood
8. #29 - Frank Kimmel
9. #17 - David Reutimann
10. #03 - Geoff Bodine

Failed to qualify: Kelly Sutton (#02), Phil Bonifield (#25), L. W. Miller (#28), Greg Sacks (#48), Loni Richardson (#0)

=== Easycare Vehicle Contracts 200 ===
The inaugural EasyCare Vehicle Service Contracts 200 was held March 13 at Atlanta Motor Speedway. David Reutimann won the pole. Toyota's First Pole in the Truck series.

Top ten results

1. #4 - Bobby Hamilton
2. #42 - Mike Skinner
3. #17 - David Reutimann
4. #24 - Travis Kvapil
5. #6 - Matt Crafton
6. #15 - Shane Hmiel
7. #99 - Carl Edwards
8. #1 - Ted Musgrave
9. #18 - Chad Chaffin
10. #52 - Ken Schrader

Failed to qualify: Greg Sacks (#48), L. W. Miller (#28), Loni Richardson (#0)

- This race saw a scary crash on lap 45, involving Rick Crawford, Tina Gordon, and Hank Parker Jr.

=== Kroger 250 ===
The Kroger 250 was held April 17 at Martinsville Speedway. Jack Sprague won the pole. Top ten results

1. #14 - Rick Crawford
2. #46 - Dennis Setzer
3. #16 - Jack Sprague
4. #50 - Jon Wood
5. #42 - Mike Skinner
6. #99 - Carl Edwards
7. #6 - Matt Crafton
8. #17 - David Reutimann
9. #75 - David Starr
10. #18 - Chad Chaffin

Failed to qualify: Geoff Bodine (#03), Chris Wimmer (#63), Johnny Sauter (#43), David Froelich Jr. (#57), Kelly Sutton (#02), Wayne Edwards (#48), Richard Hampton (#19), Ricky Gonzalez (#93), Craig Wood (#73)

- Future Cup Series champion Brad Keselowski made his NASCAR debut in this race, driving the #29 Ford for his father's team. Keselowski started 26th and finished 33rd.

=== UAW/GM Ohio 250 ===
For the first time in 50 years a NASCAR race was held in Ohio. The UAW/GM Ohio 250 was held May 16 at Mansfield Motorsports Speedway. Jack Sprague was awarded the pole after rain washed out qualifying.

Top ten results

1. #16 - Jack Sprague
2. #46 - Dennis Setzer
3. #10 - Terry Cook
4. #4 - Bobby Hamilton
5. #88 - Tracy Hines
6. #59 - Mark McFarland
7. #14 - Rick Crawford
8. #50 - Jon Wood
9. #75 - David Starr
10. #6 - Matt Crafton

Failed to qualify: Kevin Love (#67), Robert Huffman (#12), David Froelich Jr. (#57), Richard Hampton (#19), Craig Wood (#73), J. C. Stout (#91), Sean Murphy (#30), David Ragan (#66), Chris Winter (#05), Randy van Zant (#83), Jim Walker (#74)

=== Infineon 200 ===
The Infineon 200 was held May 21 at Lowe's Motor Speedway. David Starr won the pole.

Top ten results

1. #46 - Dennis Setzer
2. #99 - Carl Edwards
3. #75 - David Starr
4. #92 - Kevin Harvick
5. #47 - Michael Waltrip
6. #15 - Shane Hmiel
7. #14 - Rick Crawford
8. #24 - Travis Kvapil
9. #6 - Matt Crafton
10. #4 - Bobby Hamilton

Failed to qualify: Kelly Sutton (#02), Derrike Cope (#48)

=== MBNA America 200 ===
The MBNA America 200 was held June 4 at Dover International Speedway. Carl Edwards won the pole.

Top ten results

1. #18 - Chad Chaffin*
2. #14 - Rick Crawford
3. #21 - Hank Parker Jr.
4. #42 - Mike Skinner
5. #52 - Ken Schrader
6. #23 - Dave Blaney
7. #2 - Andy Houston
8. #75 - David Starr
9. #16 - Jack Sprague
10. #50 - Jon Wood

Failed to qualify: none

- This was Chaffin's first career victory.

=== O'Reilly 400K ===
The O'Reilly 400K was held June 11 at Texas Motor Speedway. Ted Musgrave won the pole.

Top ten results

1. #46 - Dennis Setzer
2. #1 - Ted Musgrave
3. #17 - David Reutimann
4. #16 - Jack Sprague
5. #18 - Chad Chaffin
6. #99 - Carl Edwards
7. #4 - Bobby Hamilton
8. #6 - Matt Crafton
9. #2 - Andy Houston
10. #62 - Steve Park

Failed to qualify: none

=== O'Reilly 200 ===
The O'Reilly 200 was held June 19 at Memphis Motorsports Park. Jack Sprague won the pole.

Top ten results

1. #4 - Bobby Hamilton
2. #15 - Shane Hmiel
3. #1 - Ted Musgrave
4. #46 - Dennis Setzer
5. #99 - Carl Edwards
6. #6 - Matt Crafton
7. #16 - Jack Sprague
8. #50 - Jon Wood
9. #18 - Chad Chaffin
10. #75 - David Starr

Failed to qualify: Darren Shaw (#04), Jarod Robie (#98), Paul White (#77), Scotty Sands (#97), Dennis Hannel (#94)

=== Black Cat Fireworks 200 ===
The Black Cat Fireworks 200 was held June 25 at The Milwaukee Mile. Ted Musgrave won the pole.

Top ten results

1. #1 - Ted Musgrave
2. #18 - Chad Chaffin
3. #46 - Dennis Setzer
4. #62 - Steve Park
5. #24 - Travis Kvapil
6. #4 - Bobby Hamilton
7. #10 - Terry Cook
8. #07 - Shane Sieg
9. #14 - Rick Crawford
10. #6 - Matt Crafton

Failed to qualify: none

=== O'Reilly Auto Parts 250 ===
The O'Reilly Auto Parts 250 was held July 3 at Kansas Speedway. Dennis Setzer won the pole.

Top ten results

1. #99 - Carl Edwards
2. #4 - Bobby Hamilton
3. #14 - Rick Crawford
4. #62 - Steve Park
5. #6 - Matt Crafton
6. #50 - Jon Wood
7. #24 - Travis Kvapil
8. #16 - Jack Sprague
9. #18 - Chad Chaffin
10. #10 - Terry Cook

Failed to qualify: none

=== Built Ford Tough 225 ===
The Built Ford Tough 225 was held July 10 at Kentucky Speedway. Dennis Setzer won the pole.

Top ten results

1. #4 - Bobby Hamilton
2. #16 - Jack Sprague
3. #75 - David Starr
4. #6 - Matt Crafton
5. #18 - Chad Chaffin
6. #62 - Steve Park
7. #1 - Ted Musgrave
8. #2 - Andy Houston
9. #17 - David Reutimann
10. #12 - Robert Huffman

Failed to qualify: none

=== Missouri-Illinois Dodge Dealers Ram Tough 200 ===
The Missouri-Illinois Dodge Dealers Ram Tough 200 was held July 17 at Gateway International Raceway. Jack Sprague won the pole.

Top ten results

1. #75 - David Starr
2. #46 - Dennis Setzer
3. #1 - Ted Musgrave
4. #18 - Chad Chaffin
5. #21 - Hank Parker Jr.
6. #6 - Matt Crafton
7. #24 - Travis Kvapil
8. #59 - Randy LaJoie
9. #17 - David Reutimann
10. #22 - Bill Lester

Failed to qualify: none

- This race was infamous for its chaotic finish, which saw four Green-White-Checkered attempts to finish under green. As a result, NASCAR would begin limiting the number of GWC attempts in future races. Unlimited Green-White-Checkered finishing attempts would not return until 2017.

=== Line-X Spray-On Truck Bedliners 200 ===
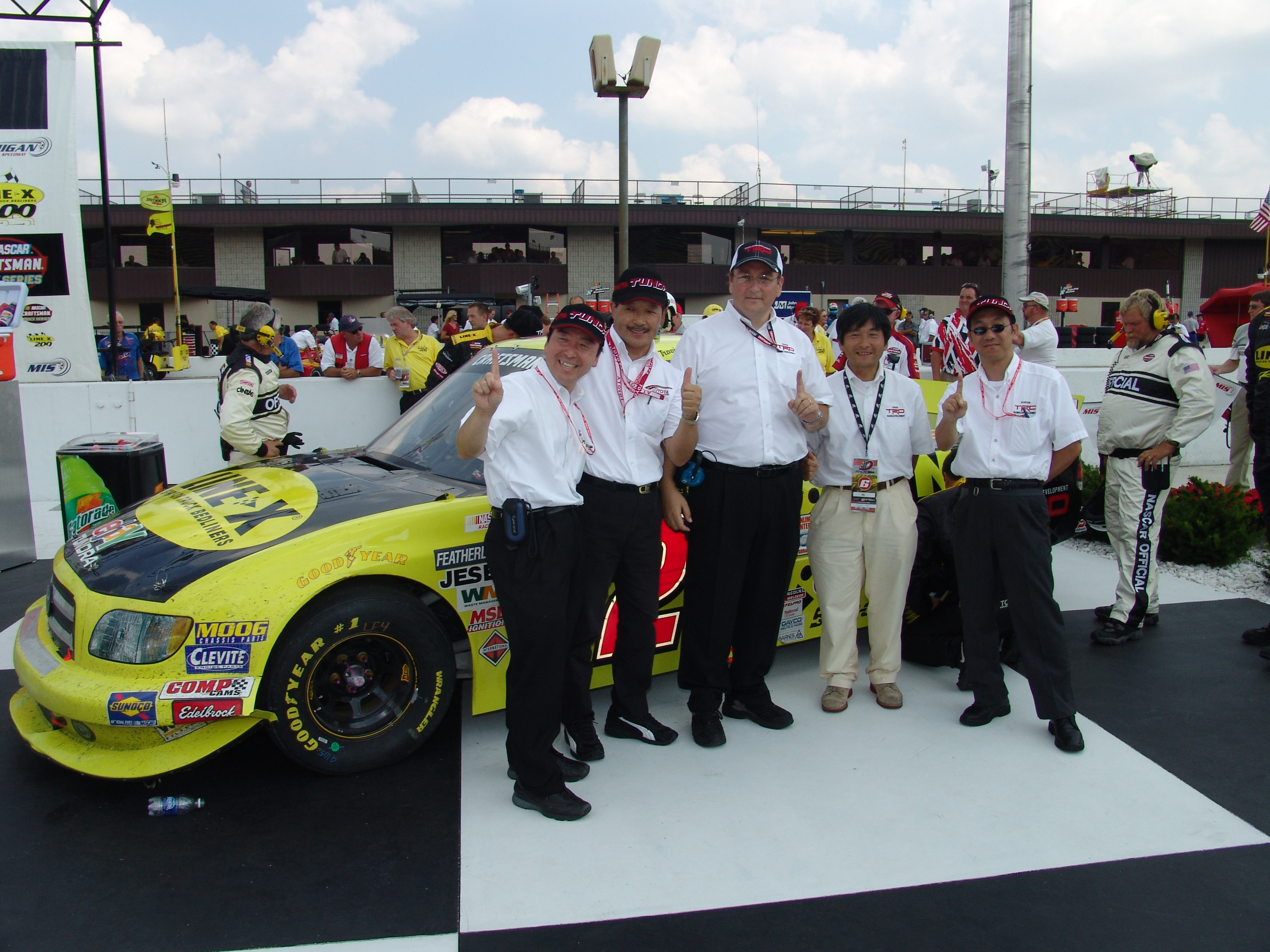
Toyota executives in victory lane with Travis Kvapil's race winning truck at Michigan

The Line-X Spray-On Truck Bedliners 200 was held July 31 at Michigan International Speedway. Dennis Setzer won the pole.

Top ten results

1. #24 - Travis Kvapil*
2. #1 - Ted Musgrave
3. #42 - Mike Skinner
4. #23 - Johnny Benson
5. #4 - Bobby Hamilton
6. #99 - Carl Edwards
7. #10 - Terry Cook
8. #15 - Shane Hmiel
9. #12 - Robert Huffman
10. #46 - Dennis Setzer

Failed to qualify: none

- Kvapil's victory marked the first NASCAR victory for Toyota.

=== Power Stroke Diesel 200 ===
The Power Stroke Diesel 200 was held August 6 at Indianapolis Raceway Park. Jack Sprague won the pole.

Top ten results

1. #18 - Chad Chaffin
2. #43 - Johnny Sauter
3. #4 - Bobby Hamilton
4. #24 - Travis Kvapil
5. #99 - Carl Edwards
6. #15 - Shane Hmiel
7. #6 - Matt Crafton
8. #14 - Rick Crawford
9. #88 - Tracy Hines
10. #03 - Denny Hamlin*

Failed to qualify: Chris Wimmer (#63), Tim Schendel (#31), Kelly Sutton (#02), Ken Weaver (#08), Charlie Bradberry (#78), Buddy Davis (#28), Sean Murphy (#30), Greg Pope (#89), Nick Tucker (#48), Eric McClure (#27), Scotty Sands (#97), Jim Walker (#74), Patrick Lawson (#26), Dennis Hannel (#0), Casey Kingsland (#55)

- Denny Hamlin made his NASCAR debut in this race, driving the #03 Chevy for Team EJP Racing. Hamlin impressed many by started 7th and finishing 10th.
- This race marked the final NASCAR appearance of Andy Petree Racing, fielding the #33 Chevy with Michael Waltrip driving. Waltrip qualified 15th, but finished last after crashing out early.

=== Toyota Tundra 200 ===
The Toyota Tundra 200 was held August 14 at Nashville Superspeedway. Bobby Hamilton Jr. won the pole.

Top ten results

1. #4 - Bobby Hamilton
2. #75 - David Starr
3. #1 - Ted Musgrave
4. #04 - Bobby Hamilton Jr.
5. #62 - Steve Park
6. #23 - Johnny Benson
7. #6 - Matt Crafton
8. #12 - Robert Huffman
9. #17 - David Reutimann
10. #42 - Mike Skinner

Failed to qualify: James Hylton (#77)

=== O'Reilly 200 presented by Valvoline Maxlife ===
The O'Reilly 200 presented by Valvoline Maxlife was held August 25 at Bristol Motor Speedway. Ken Schrader won the pole.

Top ten results

1. #99 - Carl Edwards
2. #15 - Shane Hmiel
3. #6 - Matt Crafton
4. #47 - Robby Gordon
5. #92 - Kevin Harvick
6. #21 - Hank Parker Jr.
7. #75 - David Starr
8. #24 - Travis Kvapil
9. #62 - Steve Park
10. #52 - Ken Schrader

Failed to qualify: Kelly Sutton (#02), Eric McClure (#72), Darren Shaw (#04), Ryan McGlynn (#00), Loni Richardson (#0), Nick Tucker (#48), Chris Winter (#05), Craig Wood (#73)

=== Kroger 200 ===
The Kroger 200 was held September 9 at Richmond International Raceway. Jamie McMurray won the pole.

Top ten results

1. #1 - Ted Musgrave
2. #2 - Jamie McMurray
3. #47 - Tony Stewart
4. #30 - Todd Bodine*
5. #99 - Carl Edwards
6. #12 - Robert Huffman
7. #15 - Shane Hmiel
8. #16 - Jack Sprague
9. #10 - Terry Cook
10. #42 - Mike Skinner

Failed to qualify: Jay Sauter (#06), Lance Hooper (#13), Tony Raines (#40), Mark McFarland (#59), Kelly Sutton (#02), Wayne Edwards (#93), Kyle Beattie (#0), Craig Wood (#73), J. C. Stout (#91), James Hylton (#48)

- This race marked the debut of Germain Racing, fielding the #30 Toyota with Todd Bodine driving.

=== Sylvania 200 ===
The Sylvania 200 was held September 18 at New Hampshire International Speedway. Jack Sprague won the pole.

Top ten results

1. #24 - Travis Kvapil
2. #16 - Jack Sprague
3. #23 - Johnny Benson
4. #99 - Carl Edwards
5. #17 - David Reutimann
6. #46 - Dennis Setzer
7. #1 - Ted Musgrave
8. #75 - David Starr
9. #21 - Hank Parker Jr.
10. #42 - Mike Skinner*

Failed to qualify: Travis Powell (#95)

- Despite starting several hours later than scheduled due to rain from Hurricane Ivan and with the threat of darkness, all 200 laps were completed. The race ended under caution at the scheduled distance after it was deemed too dark to have an attempt at a Green-White-Checkered finish due to a crash with less than 3 to go.
- The race was Mike Skinner's last start driving for Bang! Racing, as the #42 team would shut down due to internal issues within the team. Skinner would move to Bill Davis Racing, driving the #5 Toyota starting next week at Las Vegas.

=== Las Vegas 350 ===
The Las Vegas 350 was held September 25 at Las Vegas Motor Speedway. Mike Skinner won the pole.

Top ten results

1. #15 - Shane Hmiel*
2. #30 - Todd Bodine
3. #62 - Steve Park
4. #23 - Johnny Benson
5. #4 - Bobby Hamilton
6. #5 - Mike Skinner
7. #46 - Dennis Setzer
8. #1 - Ted Musgrave
9. #10 - Terry Cook
10. #75 - David Starr

Failed to qualify: Chris Wimmer (#63), Loni Richardson (#0)

- This was Hmiel's first career victory, and the first victory for Billy Ballew Motorsports.

=== American Racing Wheels 200 ===
The American Racing Wheels 200 was held October 2 at California Speedway. Travis Kvapil won the pole.

Top ten results

1. #30 - Todd Bodine*
2. #1 - Ted Musgrave
3. #16 - Jack Sprague
4. #75 - David Starr
5. #4 - Bobby Hamilton
6. #17 - David Reutimann
7. #23 - Johnny Benson
8. #62 - Steve Park
9. #46 - Dennis Setzer
10. #99 - Carl Edwards

Failed to qualify: none

- This was Bodine's first career victory, and the first victory for Germain Racing, coming in the team's fourth Series start.

=== Silverado 350K ===
The Silverado 350K was held October 16 at Texas Motor Speedway. Mike Skinner won the pole.

Top ten results

1. #30 - Todd Bodine
2. #23 - Johnny Benson
3. #4 - Bobby Hamilton
4. #75 - David Starr
5. #16 - Jack Sprague
6. #1 - Ted Musgrave
7. #14 - Rick Crawford
8. #46 - Dennis Setzer
9. #99 - Carl Edwards
10. #15 - Shane Hmiel

Failed to qualify: Jay Sauter (#06), Wayne Edwards (#77), Loni Richardson (#0), Blake Mallory (#35)

=== Kroger 200 ===
The Kroger 200 was held October 23 at Martinsville Speedway. Bobby Hamilton won the pole.

Top ten results

1. #2 - Jamie McMurray*
2. #46 - Dennis Setzer
3. #47 - Bobby Labonte
4. #50 - Jon Wood
5. #1 - Ted Musgrave
6. #6 - Matt Crafton
7. #30 - Todd Bodine
8. #99 - Carl Edwards
9. #59 - Bobby Hamilton Jr.
10. #12 - Robert Huffman

Failed to qualify: Robbie Ferguson (#93), Tony Raines (#40), Davin Scites (#20), Darrell Waltrip (#11), Jim Walker (#74), Eric King (#00), Tam Topham (#70), Craig Wood (#73), Jimmy Mullins (#77)

- This was McMurray's first career victory.

=== Chevy Silverado 150 ===
The Chevy Silverado 150 was held November 5 at Phoenix International Raceway. Jack Sprague won the pole.

Top ten results

1. #75 - David Starr
2. #16 - Jack Sprague
3. #6 - Matt Crafton
4. #15 - Shane Hmiel
5. #23 - Johnny Benson
6. #62 - Steve Park
7. #4 - Bobby Hamilton
8. #2 - P. J. Jones
9. #46 - Dennis Setzer
10. #99 - Carl Edwards

Failed to qualify: Brad Teague (#72), Danny Bagwell (#41)

=== Darlington 200 ===
The Darlington 200 was held November 13 at Darlington Raceway after rain washed out the race November 12. The race was moved to Saturday as part of a day-night doubleheader on the Southern 500 weekend. Carl Edwards won the pole.

Top ten results

1. #2 - Kasey Kahne*
2. #4 - Bobby Hamilton
3. #1 - Ted Musgrave
4. #99 - Carl Edwards
5. #62 - Steve Park
6. #23 - Johnny Benson
7. #75 - David Starr
8. #88 - Matt Crafton
9. #12 - Robert Huffman
10. #52 - Ken Schrader

Failed to qualify: Danny Bagwell (#41)

- This was Kahne's first Truck series victory in his first start.

=== Ford 200 ===
The Ford 200 was held November 19 at Homestead-Miami Speedway. David Reutimann won the pole.

Top ten results

1. #2 - Kasey Kahne
2. #1 - Ted Musgrave
3. #75 - David Starr
4. #17 - David Reutimann
5. #6 - Matt Crafton
6. #5 - Mike Skinner
7. #16 - Jack Sprague
8. #44 - Greg Biffle
9. #06 - Regan Smith
10. #46 - Dennis Setzer

Failed to qualify: Sammy Sanders (#04), Brad Keselowski (#63), Shigeaki Hattori (#01), Derrike Cope (#48), Todd Bodine (#30), Jeff Jefferson (#03), Eric Jones (#74), Scott Lynch (#59), Ken Weaver (#08), Danny Bagwell (#41)

== Full Drivers' Championship ==
(key) Bold – Pole position awarded by time. Italics – Pole position set by owner's points. * – Most laps led.

Pos	Driver	DAY	ATL	MAR	MFD	CLT	DOV	TEX	MEM	MIL	KAN	KEN	GTW	MCH	IRP	NSH	BRI	RCH	NHA	LVS	CAL	TEX	MAR	PHO	DAR	HOM	Points
1	Bobby Hamilton	11	1	31	4	10	19	7	1	6	2*	1*	17	5*	3	1	12	26	15	5	5	3	26	7	2	16	3624
2	Dennis Setzer	6	11	2	2	1	18	1	4	3	25	11	2	10	12	19	16	13	6	7	9	8	2	9	17	10	3578
3	Ted Musgrave	26	8	15	13	31	12	**2***	3*	**1***	30	7	3	2	25	3	27	1*	7	8	2	6	5*	19*	3	2	3554
4	Carl Edwards	1*	7	6	17	2*	**14**	6	5	23	1	33	18	6	5	20	1	5	4	33	10	9	8	10	**4**	12	3493
5	Matt Crafton	19	5	7	10	9	29	8	6	10	5	4	6	12	7	7	3	21	13	22	24	21	6	3	8	5	3379
6	David Starr	12	36	9	9	3	8	29	10	33	19	3	1	21	16	2	7	23	8	10	4	4	29	1	7	3	3298
7	Jack Sprague	25	24	**3***	1*	26	9	4	**7**	35	8	2	**29**	27	**18**	14	28	8	**2***	36	3	5	28	**2**	11	7	3167
8	Travis Kvapil	2	4	13	32	8	16	27	13	5	7	15	7	1	4	13	8	31	1	28	**18**	23	21	15	19	19	3152
9	Steve Park	27	12	26	27	12	13	10	11	4	4	6	31	17	22	5	9	12	14	3*	8	12	23	6	5	23	3138
10	Chad Chaffin	13	9	10	31	30	1	5	9	2	9	5	4	11	1	12	29	22	16	16	11	16	30	30	15	15	3122
11	Mike Skinner	28	2*	5	11	15	4*	11	26	29	12	18	28	3	13	10	23*	10	10	**6**	33	**11**	33	17	23	6	3037
12	Rick Crawford	4	34	1	7	7	2	15	19	9	3	16	25	32	8	24	17	24	25	11	12	7	16	11	18	28	3030
13	Shane Hmiel	14	6	35	35	6	23	26	2	12	26	34	16*	8	6	11	2	7	20	1	30	10	24	4	33	27	2954
14	David Reutimann **(R)**	9	**3**	8	14	36	17	3	17	32	29	9	9	24	17	9	11	30	5	17	6	30	27	21	28	**4**	2904
15	Jon Wood	7	27	4	8	17	10	13	8	11	6	12	30	30	27	18	18	14	29	12	13	26	4	26	22	36	2835
16	Terry Cook	**5**	18	22	3	14	20	24	27	7	10	30	26	7	14	16	24	9	35	9	19	32	13	14	12	25	2821
17	Hank Parker Jr.	18	33	12	19	22	3	23	12	17	21	22	5	29	15	15	6	20	9	21	15	13	31	23	35	17	2737
18	Tracy Hines **(R)**	20	16	29	5	34	21	16	14	14	14	17	15	16	9	22	21	19	30	18	31	19	35	34	13	13	2604
19	Brandon Whitt **(R)**	22	20	14	18	18	31	22	15	15	23	14	23	28	20	17	31	17	19	13	35	15	12	20	14	26	2569
20	Andy Houston	30	19	11	15	19	7	9	20	19	31	8	13	23	19	25	19		33	14	21	14	25	16	34	18	2540
21	Chase Montgomery **(R)**	31	23	16	29	24	28	17	18	27	13	20	12	15	32	23	20	27	17	27	16	17	19	36	29	21	2404
22	Bill Lester	16	15	17	30	21	25	12	23	34	28	29	10	18	31	31	14	29	27	24	28	28	14	18	16	24	2400
23	Robert Huffman **(R)**	36	29	34	DNQ	16	11	28	16	36	24	10	27	9	23	8	32	6	32	31	17	29	10	34	9	35	2314
24	Shane Sieg **(R)**	23	13	20	12	32	15	14	22	8	16	13	11	26	21	26	26	18	23	26							2020
25	Johnny Benson													4	24	6	13	25	3	4	7	2	11	5	6	11	1818
26	Kelly Sutton **(R)**	DNQ	32	DNQ	20	DNQ	27	30	31	25	35	23	21	25	DNQ	28	DNQ	DNQ	24	35	25	35	34	35	36	34	1432
27	Todd Bodine					20					15							4	34	2	1	1*	7	29	20	DNQ	1317
28	Ken Schrader		10	36		11	5								34		**10**	33	12				17	12	10	33	1297
29	Ken Weaver **(R)**	35		28	33	23	22	18	34	31	20	26	22		DNQ	34				29		24		32		DNQ	1212
30	Deborah Renshaw											25		22	33	27	36	32	22	32	23	34	15	28	30	20	1150
31	Chris Wimmer **(R)**			DNQ	36				36	20	18	21	24		DNQ	33	25	36		DNQ	29	27		33			942
32	David Ragan				DNQ			20				19	19	31	35	32	30	35	21	34							802
33	Shelby Howard **(R)**	29	25	23	23	33		21	24	21																	707
34	Brad Keselowski **(R)**			33	16		30	25	35	18	27		20													DNQ	692
35	J. R. Patton																			15	26	31	18	25	31	22	637
36	Mark McFarland			21	6	28	35		33						29	29		DNQ									603
37	Denny Hamlin														10			16	11	23		18					582
38	Randy LaJoie	34	14									32	8	14			35										570
39	Paul White								DNQ	30		28	14		30	30	22										516
40	Geoff Bodine	10	21	DNQ	22	27						27															495
41	Kevin Love			27	DNQ		24		21	24	11																494
42	Eric Jones										19	24								25	32	20				DNQ	461
43	Lance Hooper						33	19	25		22			20				DNQ									458
44	Jamie McMurray																	**2**	28				1				444
45	Charlie Bradberry				21	29						31			DNQ	36		34					32				417
46	Bobby Hamilton Jr.															**4***							9		27		395
47	Kasey Kahne																								1*	1*	380
48	Jay Sauter											31				21	15	DNQ				DNQ			26		373
49	Tina Gordon	24	35	30	34	25																					371
50	Frank Kimmel	8	30			13																					344
51	Sean Murphy				DNQ										DNQ								22	24	32	30	338
52	Jason Small																				22	33			21	31	331
53	Kevin Harvick					4											5										315
54	Johnny Sauter			DNQ											2*			11									310
55	Jimmy Spencer									16								28	18								303
56	Loni Richardson	DNQ	DNQ					34						34		35	DNQ		36	DNQ	36	DNQ					290
57	Johnny Chapman							31					34	19							20						284
58	P. J. Jones																				14			8			263
59	Bobby Labonte																						3			29	246
60	Joe Aramendia	33		25	28																						231
61	Michael Waltrip					5									36												215
62	Butch Miller														24			17									209
63	Steadman Marlin	17	22																								209
64	Wayne Edwards	15	28	DNQ								36	33					DNQ				DNQ					198
65	Scott Lynch																			19				27		DNQ	188
66	Jamey Caudill			19					29																		182
67	Eric Norris																					36				14	176
68	Mike Wallace	3																									170
69	Tony Stewart																	3									165
70	Tim Schendel									22					DNQ											32	164
71	Robby Gordon																4										160
72	Teri MacDonald				25				32																		155
73	Jerry Hill		26				32																				152
74	Dave Blaney						6																				150
75	Bobby Dotter										34								26		34						146
76	Brad Teague																34				27			DNQ			143
77	Greg Biffle																									8	142
78	Regan Smith																									9	138
79	Joey Clanton	32	31																								137
80	Ryck Sanders										32		32														134
81	Kyle Busch														11												130
82	Dana White			32		35																					125
83	Jim Sauter									13																	124
84	J. J. Yeley													13													124
85	Ron Hornaday Jr.																							13			124
86	Tony Raines		17															DNQ					DNQ				112
87	Andy Petree			18																							109
88	Brandon Miller																			20							103
89	Nick Tucker														DNQ		DNQ						20				103
90	Randy MacDonald	21																									100
91	Sammy Sanders																					22				DNQ	97
92	Derrike Cope					DNQ																		22		DNQ	97
93	Darrell Waltrip			24											28								DNQ				91
94	Kevin Dowler				24																						91
95	Jason Leffler																								24		91
96	Chad Blount																					25					88
97	Josh Richeson																								25		88
98	Ricky Gonzalez			DNQ	26																						85
99	Derrick Kelley						26																				85
100	Erik Darnell									26																	85
101	David Froelich Jr.			DNQ	DNQ				28																		79
102	Jeff Jefferson									28																DNQ	79
103	J. C. Stout				DNQ				30									DNQ									73
104	Rick Bogart																			30							73
105	Ricky Craven																		31								70
106	Greg Sacks	DNQ	DNQ					32																			67
107	Phil Bonifield	DNQ					34	33			33			33													64
108	A. J. Fike																33										64
109	Bill Manfull																						36				55
110	L. W. Miller	DNQ	DNQ																								
111	Richard Hampton			DNQ	DNQ																						
112	Craig Wood			DNQ	DNQ												DNQ	DNQ					DNQ				
113	Randy van Zant				DNQ																						
114	Jim Walker				DNQ										DNQ								DNQ				
115	Chris Winter				DNQ												DNQ										
116	Jarod Robie								DNQ																		
117	Scotty Sands								DNQ						DNQ												
118	Dennis Hannel								DNQ						DNQ												
119	Darren Shaw								DNQ								DNQ										
120	Buddy Davis														DNQ												
121	Greg Pope														DNQ												
122	Patrick Lawson														DNQ												
123	Casey Kingsland														DNQ												
124	Eric McClure														DNQ		DNQ										
124	James Hylton															DNQ		DNQ									
125	Ryan McGlynn																DNQ										
126	Kyle Beattie																	DNQ									
127	Travis Powell																		DNQ								
128	Blake Mallory																					DNQ					
129	Robbie Ferguson																						DNQ				
130	Tam Topham																						DNQ				
131	Eric King																						DNQ				
132	Davin Scites																						DNQ				
133	Jimmy Mullins																						DNQ				
134	Danny Bagwell																							DNQ	DNQ	DNQ	
135	Shigeaki Hattori																									DNQ	
Pos	Driver	DAY	ATL	MAR	MFD	CLT	DOV	TEX	MEM	MIL	KAN	KEN	GTW	MCH	IRP	NSH	BRI	RCH	NHA	LVS	CAL	TEX	MAR	PHO	DAR	HOM	Points

== Rookie of the Year ==
34-year-old David Reutimann, driving for the start-up Darrell Waltrip Motorsports, clinched the 2004 Rookie of the Year title, posting four top-fives and winning two poles. Runner-up Tracy Hines had two top-tens for ThorSport Racing, while neither Brandon Whitt nor Chase Montgomery had a top-ten. Shane Sieg, Kelly Sutton, Ken Weaver, Chris Wimmer and Brad Keselowski had only part-time runs, while Shelby Howard was released from his ride early in the season.

== See also ==
- 2004 NASCAR Nextel Cup Series
- 2004 NASCAR Busch Series
