= East (surname) =

East is an English surname. Notable people with the surname include:

- Andrew East (born 1991), American football player
- Angela East, British cellist
- Bobby East (born 1984), American racing driver
- Danny East (born 1991), English footballer
- David East, British police officer and rugby union official
- David East (artist), American artist
- Edward Hyde East (1764–1847), British politician
- Edward Murray East (1879–1938), American plant geneticist, botanist, and eugenicist
- Elyssa East, American writer
- Fleur East, English singer
- Guy East (cyclist) (born 1987), American; brother of Andrew East
- Ida Horton East (1842–1915), American philanthropist
- Jamie East (born 1974), English television presenter
- Jeff East (born 1957), American actor
- John Porter East, US Senator
- Katherine East, Canadian-British actress
- Kevin East (born 1971), American soccer player
- May East, Brazilian musician
- Michael East (composer) (c. 1580–1648), English organist and composer
- Michael East (athlete) (born 1978), English middle-distance runner
- Morris East (born 1973), Filipino boxer
- Nathan East (born 1955), American musician
- Paul East (1946–2023), New Zealand politician
- Ray East (born 1947), English cricketer
- Robert East (actor) (born 1943), Welsh actor
- Ron East (1943–2023), American football player
- Sean East II (born 2000), American basketball player
- Shawn Johnson East (born 1992), American gymnast; wife of Andrew East
- Thomas East, English printer and music publisher
- Warren East (born 1961), British businessman
- William East (disambiguation)
