= 2005 NASCAR Craftsman Truck Series =

American motorsport season

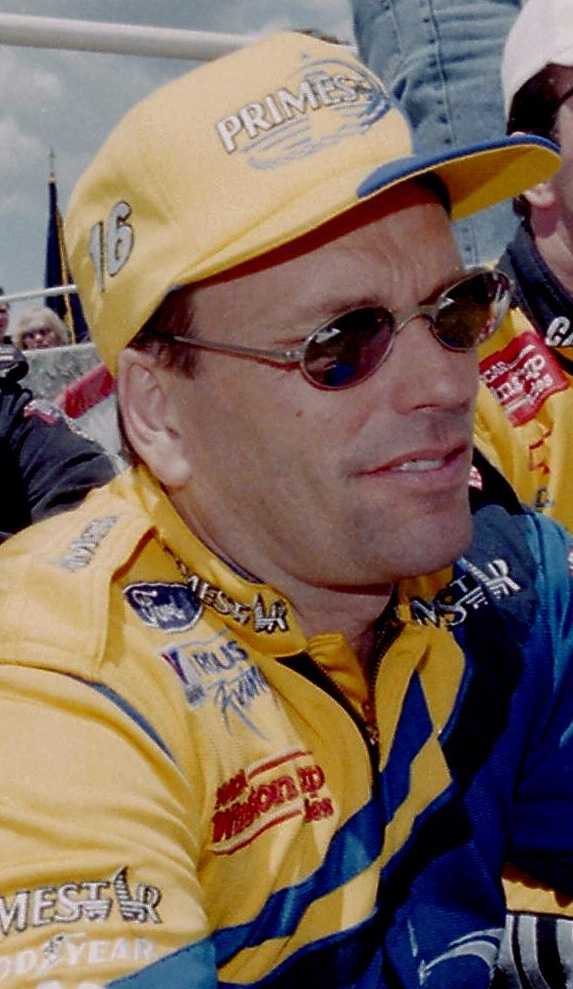
Ted Musgrave, the 2005 Craftsman Truck Series champion.

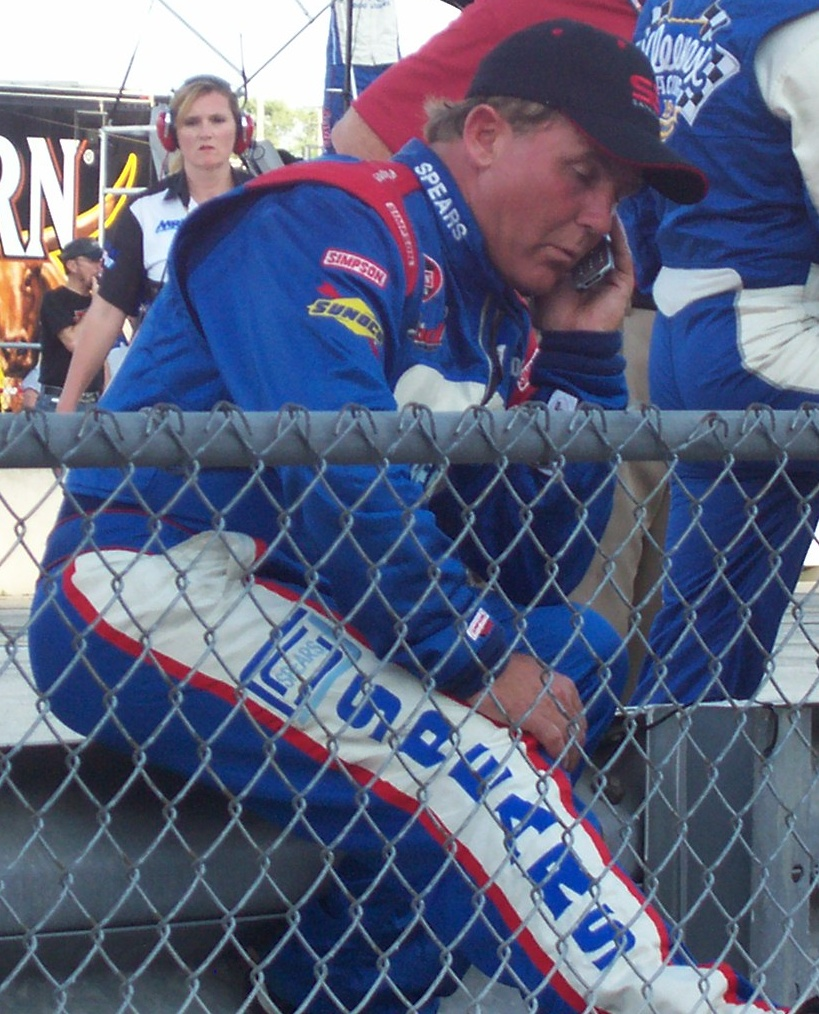
Dennis Setzer finished second behind Musgrave.

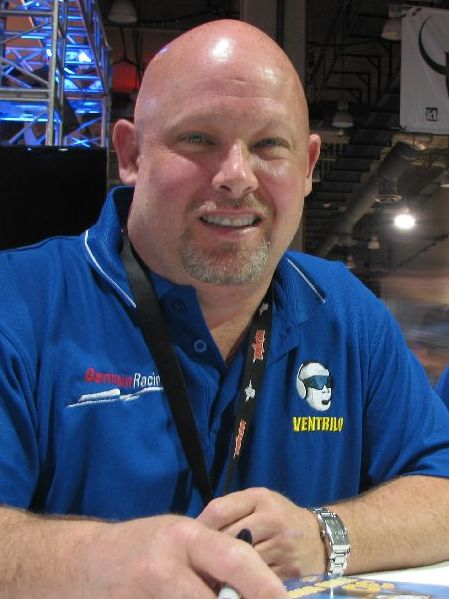
Todd Bodine finished third in the championship.

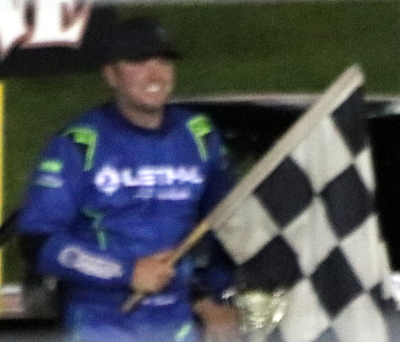
Todd Kluever, shown here in 2019, the Craftsman Truck Series Rookie of the Year.

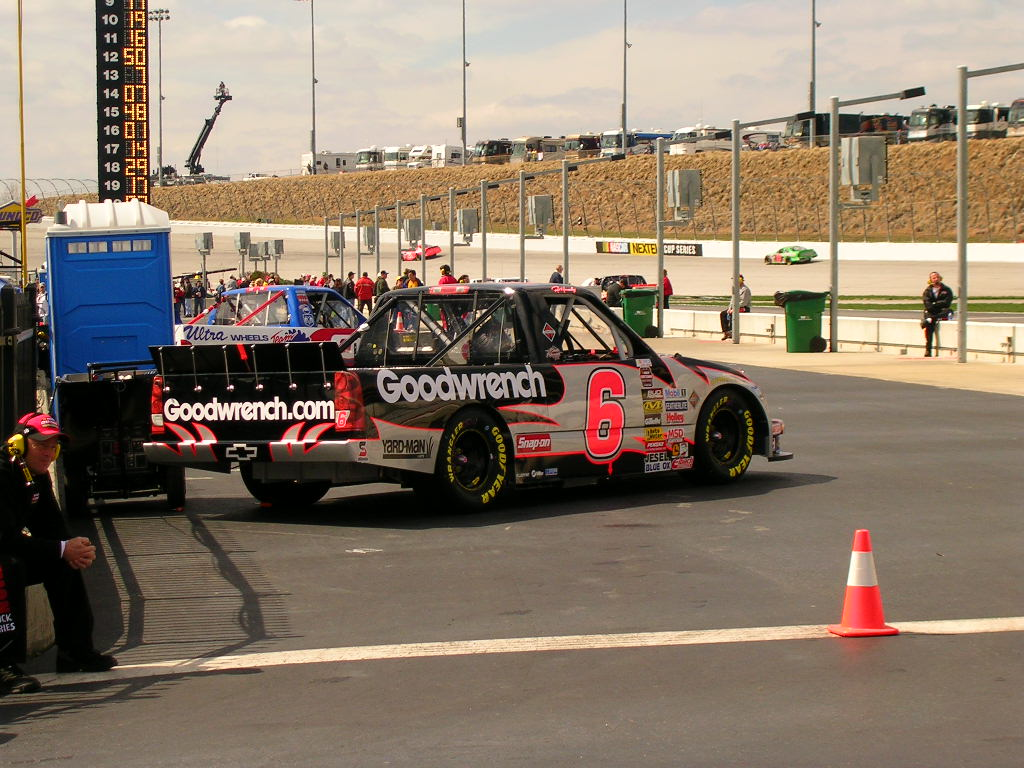
Chevrolet won the manufacturers' championship with 9 wins.

The 2005 NASCAR Craftsman Truck Series was the eleventh season of the Craftsman Truck Series, the pickup truck racing series sanctioned by NASCAR in the United States. Ted Musgrave of Ultra Motorsports was crowned the season's champion.

A rule change affected the qualification process in 2005. The top 30 teams in the owners' standings at the end of the 2004 season saw their drivers qualify automatically for the first four races of the season, provided they attempted all races in the previous year. However, only 29 teams met the criteria, so at the start of the season, one additional spot was available for the remaining teams on the entry list. After the fourth race, current standings were used to determine the teams guaranteed to have their drivers in the field.

== 2005 teams and drivers ==
=== Full-time teams ===
Manufacturer	Team	No.	Driver(s)	Crew chief
Chevrolet	Billy Ballew Motorsports	15	Kerry Earnhardt 2	Richie Wauters
Chevrolet	Billy Ballew Motorsports	15	Shane Hmiel 4	Richie Wauters
Chevrolet	Billy Ballew Motorsports	15	Kyle Busch 11	Richie Wauters
Chevrolet	Billy Ballew Motorsports	15	Johnny Sauter 1	Richie Wauters
Chevrolet	Billy Ballew Motorsports	15	Martin Truex Jr. 1	Richie Wauters
Chevrolet	Billy Ballew Motorsports	15	John Andretti 4	Richie Wauters
Chevrolet	Billy Ballew Motorsports	15	Blake Feese 1	Richie Wauters
Chevrolet	Billy Ballew Motorsports	15	David Gilliland 1	Richie Wauters
Chevrolet	Kevin Harvick, Inc.	6	Ron Hornaday Jr.	Wally Rogers
Chevrolet	Morgan-Dollar Motorsports	46	Dennis Setzer	Eric Phillips
Chevrolet	Spears Motorsports	75	David Starr	Dave McCarty
Chevrolet	Sutton Motorsports	02	Kelly Sutton	Jason Weissman 8 Franklin Hinson 3 Pete Hinson 3 Cal Boprey 11
Chevrolet	ThorSport Racing	13	Tracy Hines 23	Lance Hooper 1 Kevin Cram 1 Shane Tesch 23
Chevrolet	ThorSport Racing	13	Chad Chaffin 1	Lance Hooper 1 Kevin Cram 1 Shane Tesch 23
Chevrolet	ThorSport Racing	13	Johnny Sauter 1	Lance Hooper 1 Kevin Cram 1 Shane Tesch 23
Chevrolet	ThorSport Racing	88	Matt Crafton	Bud Haefele
Chevrolet	Xpress Motorsports	16	Jack Sprague 20	Chris Showalter
Chevrolet	Xpress Motorsports	16	Bobby Labonte 1	Chris Showalter
Chevrolet	Xpress Motorsports	16	Mike Bliss 4	Chris Showalter
Dodge	Bobby Hamilton Racing (Note: Renshaw's No. 8 truck was run by this team under the name BHR2.)	04	Bobby Hamilton	Danny Rollins
Dodge	Bobby Hamilton Racing	4	Casey Atwood 3	Randy Seals 24; Sammy Sanders 1
Dodge	Bobby Hamilton Racing	4	Timothy Peters (R) 16	Randy Seals 24; Sammy Sanders 1
Dodge	Bobby Hamilton Racing	4	Chris Fontaine 3	Randy Seals 24; Sammy Sanders 1
Dodge	Bobby Hamilton Racing	4	Garrett Liberty 1	Randy Seals 24; Sammy Sanders 1
Dodge	Bobby Hamilton Racing	4	John Mickel 1	Randy Seals 24; Sammy Sanders 1
Dodge	Bobby Hamilton Racing	4	Erin Crocker 1	Randy Seals 24; Sammy Sanders 1
Dodge	Bobby Hamilton Racing	8	Deborah Renshaw	Bob Bissinger 17; Shawn Parker 8
Dodge	Bobby Hamilton Racing	18	Chase Montgomery	Kip McCord
Dodge	HT Motorsports	59	Robert Pressley	Fred Graves 24; Kevin Cram 1
Dodge	Orleans Racing	62	Steve Park 20	Charlie Wilson 24; Tony Liberati 1
Dodge	Orleans Racing	62	Scott Lynch 5	Charlie Wilson 24; Tony Liberati 1
Dodge	Orleans Racing	77	Brendan Gaughan	Billy Wilburn 6 Tony Liberati 20
Dodge	Ultra Motorsports	1	Ted Musgrave	Gene Nead
Dodge	Ultra Motorsports	2	Jimmy Spencer	Buddy Barnes 9 John McQueen 1 Dan Glauz 15
Ford	Circle Bar Racing	14	Rick Crawford 24	Kevin Starland
Ford	Circle Bar Racing	14	Boris Said 1	Kevin Starland
Ford	K Automotive Racing	29	Brad Keselowski (R)	Bob Keselowski
Ford	ppc Racing	10	Terry Cook	Rick Gay
Ford	Roush Racing	50	Todd Kluever (R)	John Monsam 12; Mike Beam 13
Ford	Roush Racing	99	Ricky Craven	Mike Beam 12; John Monsam 3 John Quinn 10
Toyota	Bill Davis Racing	5	Mike Skinner	Jeff Hensley
Toyota	Bill Davis Racing	22	Bill Lester	Doug Wolcott
Toyota	Bill Davis Racing	23	Johnny Benson	Greg Ely 14; Rick Ren 11
Toyota	Darrell Waltrip Motorsports	12	Robert Huffman 14	Glenn Funderburk 20; Johnny Allen 5
Toyota	Darrell Waltrip Motorsports	12	Mike Wallace 5	Glenn Funderburk 20; Johnny Allen 5
Toyota	Darrell Waltrip Motorsports	12	Joey Miller 5	Glenn Funderburk 20; Johnny Allen 5
Toyota	Darrell Waltrip Motorsports	12	Darrell Waltrip 1	Glenn Funderburk 20; Johnny Allen 5
Toyota	Darrell Waltrip Motorsports	17	David Reutimann	Jason Overstreet
Toyota	Fiddleback Racing 10; Wyler Racing 15	66; 60	Todd Bodine 10	Tony Furr
Toyota	Fiddleback Racing 10; Wyler Racing 15	66; 60	Chad Chaffin 10	Tony Furr
Toyota	Fiddleback Racing 10; Wyler Racing 15	66; 60	Jack Sprague 5	Tony Furr
Toyota	Germain Racing with Arnold Motorsports	30	Chad Chaffin 10	Mike Hillman Jr.
Toyota	Germain Racing with Arnold Motorsports	30	Todd Bodine 15	Mike Hillman Jr.
Toyota	Red Horse Racing	38	Brandon Whitt	Jamie Jones
Chevrolet Dodge	Mighty Motorsports	24	Wayne Edwards 15	Lonnie Troxell 2 Cliff Button 23
Chevrolet Dodge	Mighty Motorsports	24	Casey Kingsland 1	Lonnie Troxell 2 Cliff Button 23
Chevrolet Dodge	Mighty Motorsports	24	Brandon Bendele 2	Lonnie Troxell 2 Cliff Button 23
Chevrolet Dodge	Mighty Motorsports	24	Blake Mallory 2	Lonnie Troxell 2 Cliff Button 23
Chevrolet Dodge	Mighty Motorsports	24	Roland Isaacs 2	Lonnie Troxell 2 Cliff Button 23
Chevrolet Dodge	Mighty Motorsports	24	Robbie Ferguson 2	Lonnie Troxell 2 Cliff Button 23
Chevrolet Dodge	Mighty Motorsports	24	Robert Richardson Jr. 1	Lonnie Troxell 2 Cliff Button 23
Chevrolet Ford	Green Light Racing	07	Sean Murphy (R) 7	Doug Howe 23; Scott Neal 2
Chevrolet Ford	Green Light Racing	07	Butch Miller 1	Doug Howe 23; Scott Neal 2
Chevrolet Ford	Green Light Racing	07	Rich Bickle 2	Doug Howe 23; Scott Neal 2
Chevrolet Ford	Green Light Racing	07	Eric Norris 4	Doug Howe 23; Scott Neal 2
Chevrolet Ford	Green Light Racing	07	Chris Wimmer 4	Doug Howe 23; Scott Neal 2
Chevrolet Ford	Green Light Racing	07	Kevin Hamlin 1	Doug Howe 23; Scott Neal 2
Chevrolet Ford	Green Light Racing	07	Jack Bailey 4	Doug Howe 23; Scott Neal 2
Chevrolet Ford	Green Light Racing	07	Chase Pistone 1	Doug Howe 23; Scott Neal 2
Chevrolet Ford	Green Light Racing	07	José Luis Ramírez 1	Doug Howe 23; Scott Neal 2
Chevrolet Ford	Green Light Racing	08	Ken Weaver 3	Scott Neal; Bobby Dotter; Doug Howe 2
Chevrolet Ford	Green Light Racing	08	Tam Topham 2	Scott Neal; Bobby Dotter; Doug Howe 2
Chevrolet Ford	Green Light Racing	08	Rich Bickle 3	Scott Neal; Bobby Dotter; Doug Howe 2
Chevrolet Ford	Green Light Racing	08	Butch Miller 2	Scott Neal; Bobby Dotter; Doug Howe 2
Chevrolet Ford	Green Light Racing	08	Kevin Lepage 1	Scott Neal; Bobby Dotter; Doug Howe 2
Chevrolet Ford	Green Light Racing	08	Johnny Chapman 4	Scott Neal; Bobby Dotter; Doug Howe 2
Chevrolet Ford	Green Light Racing	08	Chris Wimmer 2	Scott Neal; Bobby Dotter; Doug Howe 2
Chevrolet Ford	Green Light Racing	08	Bill Manfull 1	Scott Neal; Bobby Dotter; Doug Howe 2
Chevrolet Ford	Green Light Racing	08	José Luis Ramírez 1	Scott Neal; Bobby Dotter; Doug Howe 2
Chevrolet Ford	Green Light Racing	08	Jack Bailey 2	Scott Neal; Bobby Dotter; Doug Howe 2
Chevrolet Ford	Green Light Racing	08	Mark McFarland 1	Scott Neal; Bobby Dotter; Doug Howe 2
Chevrolet Ford	Green Light Racing	08	Willie Allen 1	Scott Neal; Bobby Dotter; Doug Howe 2
Chevrolet Ford	Green Light Racing	08	Jarit Johnson 2	Carl Hartman

=== Part-time teams ===
Note: If under "team", the owner's name is listed and in italics, that means the name of the race team that fielded the truck is unknown.

Manufacturer	Team	No.	Driver(s)	Crew chief	Rounds
Chevrolet	Alex Yontz Racing	61	Alex Yontz	Ed Berrier	4
Chevrolet	Billy Ballew Motorsports	32	Bill Manfull	Gary Crooks	1
Chevrolet	Curb Agajanian Racing	43	Johnny Sauter	Phil Edgar 1 Joe Shear Jr. 1	2
Chevrolet	FDNY Racing	28	David Ragan	Dick Rahilly	2
Chevrolet	Jeff Milburn Racing	76	Blake Mallory	Jeff Milburn	2
Chevrolet	Ken Schrader Racing	52	Mike Wallace	Donnie Richeson	1
Chevrolet	Ken Schrader Racing	52	Ken Schrader	Donnie Richeson	9
Chevrolet	Ken Schrader Racing	52	Mark McFarland	Donnie Richeson	1
Chevrolet	Kevin Harvick, Inc.	92	Kevin Harvick	Butch Hylton 1 Lance Dieters 3	2
Chevrolet	Kevin Harvick, Inc.	92	Burney Lamar	Butch Hylton 1 Lance Dieters 3	2
Chevrolet	Kevin Harvick, Inc.	92	Tony Stewart	Mark Tutor	1
Chevrolet	Key Motorsports	40	Andy Houston	Lance Hooper	2
Chevrolet	KW Racing	20	Ken Weaver	Doug George	1
Chevrolet	Lafferty Motorsports	89	Tom Powers	Tommy Owens	1
Chevrolet	Maverick Motorsports	82	Robert Richardson Jr.	Gary Crooks	1
Chevrolet	Morgan-Dollar Motorsports	47	Bobby Labonte	Randy Goss	4
Chevrolet	Morgan-Dollar Motorsports	47	Tony Stewart	Randy Goss	2
Chevrolet	Morgan-Dollar Motorsports	47	Aric Almirola	Randy Goss	4
Chevrolet	Morgan-Dollar Motorsports	47	Kevin Harvick	Randy Goss	1
Chevrolet	Morgan-Dollar Motorsports	47	Willie Allen	Randy Goss	1
Chevrolet	MRD Motorsports	06	Jimmy Kite	Bryan Berry	5
Chevrolet	MRD Motorsports	06	Mike Bliss	Bryan Berry	2
Chevrolet	MRD Motorsports	06	Regan Smith (R)	Bryan Berry	3
Chevrolet	Oostlander Racing	21	Mike Harmon	Steve Kuykendall	5
Chevrolet	Oostlander Racing	21	Blake Mallory	Steve Kuykendall	1
Chevrolet	Oostlander Racing	21	Shane Wallace	Darren Shaw	1
Chevrolet	Prime Development Group Racing	64	Sam Beam	Richard Broome	2
Chevrolet	Richardson Racing	35	Robert Richardson Jr.	Joey Cudmore	1
Chevrolet	Shaw Racing	45	Rick Markle	Del Markle	1
Chevrolet	Stellar Quest Racing	91	J. C. Stout	Steve Mollnow	4
Chevrolet	Tam Topham	70	Tam Topham	Mark Prater	3
Chevrolet	Xpress Motorsports	19	Regan Smith (R)	Doug George	3
Chevrolet	Wilson Motorsports	27	Frank Wilson Jr.	Larry Harris 5 David Hackathorn 1	6
Chevrolet	Wilson Motorsports	31	Frank Wilson Jr.	Kevin Cram 1 Randy Nelson 2 Ted Kennedy 3 Ernie Cope 1 Terry Shirley 2 Joe Slonkasky 1	1
Dodge	Brevak Racing	31	Jason Rudd	Kevin Cram 1 Randy Nelson 2 Ted Kennedy 3 Ernie Cope 1 Terry Shirley 2 Joe Slonkasky 1	2
Dodge	Brevak Racing	31	Steve Grissom	Kevin Cram 1 Randy Nelson 2 Ted Kennedy 3 Ernie Cope 1 Terry Shirley 2 Joe Slonkasky 1	1
Dodge	Brevak Racing	31	Nick Tucker	Kevin Cram 1 Randy Nelson 2 Ted Kennedy 3 Ernie Cope 1 Terry Shirley 2 Joe Slonkasky 1	6
Dodge	Bobby Hamilton Racing	05	John Mickel	Sammy Sanders	1
Dodge	Bobby Hamilton Racing	05	Erin Crocker	Randy Seals	1
Dodge	Glynn Motorsports	65	Regan Smith (R)	Lance Hooper 7 Charles Wright 7 Steve Plattenberger 6	4
Dodge	Glynn Motorsports	65	Clay Rogers (R)	Lance Hooper 7 Charles Wright 7 Steve Plattenberger 6	5
Dodge	Glynn Motorsports	65	T. J. Bell	Lance Hooper 7 Charles Wright 7 Steve Plattenberger 6	1
Dodge	Glynn Motorsports	65	Brad Rogers	Lance Hooper 7 Charles Wright 7 Steve Plattenberger 6	1
Dodge	Glynn Motorsports	65	Tim Fedewa	Lance Hooper 7 Charles Wright 7 Steve Plattenberger 6	9
Dodge	Jeff Vaughn	00	Eric King	Jeff Vaughn	2
Dodge	MB3 Motorsports	53	Michael Faulk	Mario Gosselin	1
Dodge	Ron Rhodes Racing	48	Derrike Cope	James Hylton	3
Dodge	Ron Rhodes Racing	48	Joey McCarthy	James Hylton	1
Dodge	Ron Rhodes Racing	48	Eric Norris	James Hylton	1
Dodge	Ron Rhodes Racing	48	Mike Osgar	James Hylton	1
Dodge	TommyRaz Motorsports	91	Casey Kingsland	Steve Kuykendall	2
Dodge	Ultra Motorsports	7	Ronnie Hornaday	Skip Duggan	1
Dodge	Welz Racing	68	Kelly Thacker	Paul Carman	1
Dodge	Welz Racing	68	Wayne Edwards	Paul Carman	1
Ford	Craig Wood	73	Craig Wood	Tony Oscar	1
Ford	East Coast Motorsports	44	Clay Rogers (R)	Bill Boder 2 David Hinson 1	3
Ford	MB Motorsports	63	J. R. Patton	Mike Mittler	1
Ford	MB Motorsports	63	Justin Allgaier	Mike Mittler	9
Ford	Roush Racing	33	Bobby East	Jeff Campey	3
Ford	Roush Racing	33	Mark Martin	Jeff Campey	1
Ford	Stephen Smith	74	Jim Walker	Freddy Fryar 1 Steve Kuykendall 1	2
Ford	Wood Brothers/JTG Racing	21	Bobby East	Dan Deeringhoff	1
Toyota	Bill Davis Racing	67	Steve Park	Dwayne Krieger	2
Toyota	Darrell Waltrip Motorsports	11	Darrell Waltrip	Todd Holbert	1
Toyota	Darrell Waltrip Motorsports	11	Ken Schrader	Todd Holbert	1
Toyota	Germain Racing with Arnold Motorsports	9	Shigeaki Hattori (R)	Tom Ackerman	12
Toyota	Germain Racing with Arnold Motorsports	9	Justin Hobgood	Tom Ackerman	5

== Schedule ==
No.	Race title	Track	Location	Date
1	Florida Dodge Dealers 250	Daytona International Speedway	Daytona Beach, Florida	February 18
2	American Racing Wheels 200	California Speedway	Fontana, California	February 25
3	World Financial Group 200	Atlanta Motor Speedway	Hampton, Georgia	March 18
4	Kroger 250	Martinsville Speedway	Ridgeway, Virginia	April 9
5	Dodge Ram Tough 200	Gateway International Raceway	Madison, Illinois	April 30
6	UAW-GM Ohio 250	Mansfield Motorsports Speedway	Mansfield, Ohio	May 15
7	Quaker Steak & Lube 200 presented by Click It or Ticket	Lowe's Motor Speedway	Concord, North Carolina	May 20
8	MBNA RacePoints 200	Dover International Speedway	Dover, Delaware	June 4
9	Chex 400K	Texas Motor Speedway	Fort Worth, Texas	June 10
10	Paramount Health Insurance 200	Michigan International Speedway	Cambridge Township, Michigan	June 18
11	Toyota Tundra Milwaukee 200	Milwaukee Mile	West Allis, Wisconsin	June 24
12	O'Reilly Auto Parts 250	Kansas Speedway	Kansas City, Kansas	July 2
13	Built Ford Tough 225	Kentucky Speedway	Sparta, Kentucky	July 9
14	O'Reilly 200 presented by Valvoline	Memphis International Raceway	Millington, Tennessee	July 23
15	Power Stroke Diesel 200	Indianapolis Raceway Park	Brownsburg, Indiana	August 5
16	Toyota Tundra 200	Nashville Superspeedway	Lebanon, Tennessee	August 13
17	O'Reilly 200 presented by Valvoline Maxlife	Bristol Motor Speedway	Bristol, Tennessee	August 24
18	Cheerios Betty Crocker 200	Richmond International Raceway	Richmond, Virginia	September 8
19	Sylvania 200 presented by Lowe's	New Hampshire International Speedway	Loudon, New Hampshire	September 17
20	Las Vegas 350	Las Vegas Motor Speedway, Las Vegas	Las Vegas, Nevada	September 24
21	Kroger 200	Martinsville Speedway	Ridgeway, Virginia	October 22
22	EasyCare Vehicle Service Contracts 200	Atlanta Motor Speedway, Hampton	Hampton, Georgia	October 29
23	Silverado 350K	Texas Motor Speedway	Fort Worth, Texas	November 4
24	Chevy Silverado 150	Phoenix International Raceway	Avondale, Arizona	November 11
25	Ford 200	Homestead–Miami Speedway	Homestead, Florida	November 19

== Races ==
=== Florida Dodge Dealers 250 ===
The Florida Dodge Dealers 250 was held February 18 at Daytona International Speedway. Kerry Earnhardt won the pole.

Top ten results

1. #04 - Bobby Hamilton*
2. #2 - Jimmy Spencer*
3. #66 - Todd Bodine
4. #99 - Ricky Craven
5. #1 - Ted Musgrave
6. #08 - Ken Weaver
7. #29 - Brad Keselowski
8. #75 - David Starr
9. #24 - Wayne Edwards
10. #23 - Johnny Benson

Failed to qualify: J. R. Patton (#63), Rick Markle (#45), David Ragan (#28), Jason Rudd (#31), Derrike Cope (#48), Mike Wallace (#52)

- A late-race wreck resulted in the race ending under caution, with Bobby Hamilton and Jimmy Spencer side-by-side when the field was frozen. Spencer, thinking he was the winner, drove his truck to Victory Lane before NASCAR officials reviewed the finish and determined Hamilton was the leader at the time the caution was called, resulting in Hamilton being declared the winner.

=== American Racing Wheels 200 ===
The American Racing Wheels 200 was held February 25 at California Speedway. Mike Skinner won the pole.

Top ten results

1. #62 - Steve Park*
2. #04 - Bobby Hamilton
3. #99 - Ricky Craven
4. #50 - Todd Kluever
5. #1 - Ted Musgrave
6. #88 - Matt Crafton
7. #2 - Jimmy Spencer
8. #6 - Ron Hornaday Jr.
9. #12 - Robert Huffman
10. #46 - Dennis Setzer

Failed to qualify: Derrike Cope (#48), Jason Rudd (#31)

- This was Park's first and only career Truck Series victory, and the last victory for Orleans Racing.

=== World Financial Group 200 ===
The World Financial Group 200 was held March 18 at Atlanta Motor Speedway. Rick Crawford won the pole.

Top ten results

1. #6 - Ron Hornaday Jr.*
2. #47 - Bobby Labonte
3. #04 - Bobby Hamilton
4. #46 - Dennis Setzer
5. #75 - David Starr
6. #1 - Ted Musgrave
7. #30 - Chad Chaffin
8. #16 - Jack Sprague
9. #10 - Terry Cook
10. #12 - Robert Huffman

Failed to qualify: Regan Smith (#19), Derrike Cope (#48), Brendan Gaughan (#77), Steve Grissom (#31)

- This race was known for the intense final lap battle between Ron Hornaday Jr. and Bobby Labonte, which ended with Hornaday barely beating Labonte by 0.008 seconds, making it one of the closest finishes in Truck Series history.

=== Kroger 250 ===
The Kroger 250 was held April 9 at Martinsville Speedway. Bobby Hamilton won the pole.

Top ten results

1. #47 - Bobby Labonte*
2. #99 - Ricky Craven
3. #6 - Ron Hornaday Jr.
4. #66 - Todd Bodine
5. #30 - Chad Chaffin
6. #15 - Shane Hmiel
7. #1 - Ted Musgrave
8. #2 - Jimmy Spencer
9. #5 - Mike Skinner
10. #10 - Terry Cook

Failed to qualify: Brendan Gaughan (#77), Darrell Waltrip (#11), Shigeaki Hattori (#9), Eric King (#00), Nick Tucker (#31), Justin Allgaier (#63), Joey McCarthy (#48), Bill Manfull (#32)

- This was Labonte's first and only career Truck Series victory, making him the fourth driver in 2005 to become a winner in all three of NASCAR's top series.

=== Dodge Ram Tough 200 ===
The Dodge Ram Tough 200 was held April 30 at Gateway International Raceway. Ted Musgrave won the pole.

Top ten results

1. #1 - Ted Musgrave
2. #46 - Dennis Setzer
3. #2 - Jimmy Spencer
4. #5 - Mike Skinner
5. #14 - Rick Crawford
6. #04 - Bobby Hamilton
7. #66 - Todd Bodine
8. #59 - Robert Pressley
9. #30 - Chad Chaffin
10. #99 - Ricky Craven

Failed to qualify: Shane Wallace (#21), Brandon Bendele (#24), Justin Allgaier (#63), Eric Norris (#48), J. C. Stout (#91)

=== UAW-GM Ohio 250 ===
The UAW-GM Ohio 250 was held May 15 at Mansfield Motorsports Speedway. Ron Hornaday Jr. won the pole.

Top ten results

1. #04 - Bobby Hamilton*
2. #16 - Jack Sprague
3. #15 - Shane Hmiel
4. #50 - Todd Kluever
5. #08 - Rich Bickle
6. #14 - Rick Crawford
7. #46 - Dennis Setzer
8. #99 - Ricky Craven
9. #75 - David Starr
10. #07 - Butch Miller

Failed to qualify: Mike Osgar (#48), Frank Wilson Jr. (#31), Sam Beam (#64), Blake Mallory (#21), Jim Walker (#74), Kelly Thacker (#68)

- This would be Hamilton's last career NASCAR victory.

=== Quaker Steak & Lube 200 ===
The Quaker Steak & Lube 200 presented by Click It or Ticket was held May 20 at Lowe's Motor Speedway. Mike Skinner won the pole.

Top ten results

1. #15 - Kyle Busch*
2. #10 - Terry Cook
3. #1 - Ted Musgrave
4. #23 - Johnny Benson
5. #62 - Steve Park
6. #22 - Bill Lester
7. #46 - Dennis Setzer
8. #77 - Brendan Gaughan
9. #88 - Matt Crafton
10. #99 - Ricky Craven

Failed to qualify: Jimmy Kite (#06), Deborah Renshaw (#8), Nick Tucker (#31), David Ragan (#28), Wayne Edwards (#24), Mike Harmon (#21)

- This was Busch's first career Truck Series victory.

=== MBNA RacePoints 200 ===
The MBNA RacePoints 200 was held June 4 at Dover International Speedway. David Starr won the pole.

Top ten results

1. #15 - Kyle Busch
2. #47 - Tony Stewart
3. #10 - Terry Cook
4. #6 - Ron Hornaday Jr.
5. #17 - David Reutimann
6. #4 - Timothy Peters
7. #99 - Ricky Craven
8. #75 - David Starr
9. #88 - Matt Crafton
10. #5 - Mike Skinner

Failed to qualify: none

=== Chex 400K ===
The Chex 400K was held June 10 at Texas Motor Speedway. Mike Skinner won the pole.

Top ten results

1. #16 - Jack Sprague
2. #23 - Johnny Benson
3. #46 - Dennis Setzer
4. #5 - Mike Skinner
5. #88 - Matt Crafton
6. #6 - Ron Hornaday Jr.
7. #10 - Terry Cook
8. #65 - Clay Rogers
9. #75 - David Starr
10. #17 - David Reutimann

Failed to qualify: none

=== Paramount Health Insurance 200 ===
The Paramount Health Insurance 200 was held June 18 at Michigan International Speedway. Kyle Busch won the pole.

Top ten results

1. #46 - Dennis Setzer
2. #15 - Kyle Busch
3. #04 - Bobby Hamilton
4. #92 - Kevin Harvick
5. #5 - Mike Skinner
6. #14 - Rick Crawford
7. #30 - Chad Chaffin
8. #17 - David Reutimann
9. #66 - Todd Bodine*
10. #16 - Jack Sprague

Failed to qualify: Kelly Sutton (#02), Blake Mallory (#24)

- Ted Musgrave and Ricky Craven, who entered this race 1st and 2nd in points, would lose those spots after both trucks failed to finish, with Craven finishing 33rd after crashing out, and Musgrave finishing 28th after blowing an engine with two laps to go.
- This would be Todd Bodine's last start with Fiddleback Racing, as the team would shut down after this race.

=== Toyota Tundra Milwaukee 200 ===
The Toyota Tundra Milwaukee 200 was held June 24 at The Milwaukee Mile. Jack Sprague won the pole.

Top ten results

1. #46 - Dennis Setzer
2. #16 - Jack Sprague
3. #1 - Ted Musgrave
4. #6 - Ron Hornaday Jr.
5. #77 - Brendan Gaughan
6. #04 - Bobby Hamilton
7. #62 - Steve Park
8. #14 - Rick Crawford
9. #50 - Todd Kluever
10. #10 - Terry Cook

Failed to qualify: Brandon Bendele (#24), Kelly Sutton (#02), Shigeaki Hattori (#9), Tom Powers (#89)

- This race saw Todd Bodine return to Germain Racing after the shutdown of Fiddleback Racing. Bodine replaced Chad Chaffin in the #30 truck, with Chaffin moving over to drive for the newly-formed Wyler Racing.

=== O'Reilly Auto Parts 250 ===
The O'Reilly Auto Parts 250 was held July 2 at Kansas Speedway. Bill Lester won the pole.

Top ten results

1. #30 - Todd Bodine
2. #50 - Todd Kluever
3. #17 - David Reutimann
4. #5 - Mike Skinner
5. #22 - Bill Lester
6. #2 - Jimmy Spencer
7. #10 - Terry Cook
8. #77 - Brendan Gaughan
9. #15 - John Andretti
10. #14 - Rick Crawford

Failed to qualify: none

- This race was marred by a large wreck involving Kelly Sutton, who's truck flipped onto its roof after slamming into Chris Fontaine's truck. Both drivers were uninjured.

=== Built Ford Tough 225 ===
The Built Ford Tough 225 pres. by Greater Cincinnati Ford Dealers was held July 9 at Kentucky Speedway. Bill Lester won the pole.

Top ten results

1. #46 - Dennis Setzer
2. #30 - Todd Bodine
3. #17 - David Reutimann
4. #5 - Mike Skinner
5. #1 - Ted Musgrave
6. #38 - Brandon Whitt
7. #88 - Matt Crafton
8. #62 - Steve Park
9. #23 - Johnny Benson
10. #75 - David Starr

Failed to qualify: Justin Allgaier (#63), Blake Mallory (#76)

- Rick Crawford suffered a hard crash in practice and was not cleared to race, being replaced in the #14 in the race by Boris Said, ending Crawford's streak of 210 consecutive starts.

=== O'Reilly 200 presented by Valvoline ===
The O'Reilly 200 presented by Valvoline was held July 23 at Memphis Motorsports Park. Brandon Whitt won the pole.

Top ten results

1. #38 - Brandon Whitt*
2. #17 - David Reutimann
3. #77 - Brendan Gaughan
4. #46 - Dennis Setzer
5. #75 - David Starr
6. #04 - Bobby Hamilton
7. #88 - Matt Crafton
8. #15 - John Andretti
9. #23 - Johnny Benson
10. #50 - Todd Kluever

Failed to qualify: Justin Allgaier (#63), Jim Walker (#74), Sam Beam (#64), Frank Wilson Jr. (#27)

- Ron Hornaday Jr. led the race coming off through the final two corners, but a wreck had occurred leaving smoke on the track. Hornaday slowed down and was hit from behind by Whitt, spinning Hornaday's truck around. Hornaday finished 21st.
- This was Whitt's first and only career Truck Series victory, and the first victory for Red Horse Racing.

=== Power Stroke Diesel 200 ===
The Power Stroke Diesel 200 was held on August 5 at Indianapolis Raceway Park. Dennis Setzer won the pole.

Top ten results

1. #46 - Dennis Setzer
2. #50 - Todd Kluever
3. #6 - Ron Hornaday Jr.
4. #88 - Matt Crafton*
5. #2 - Jimmy Spencer
6. #14 - Rick Crawford
7. #59 - Robert Pressley
8. #77 - Brendan Gaughan
9. #16 - Jack Sprague
10. #47 - Aric Almirola

Failed to qualify: Clay Rogers (#44), Frank Wilson Jr. (#27), Bobby East (#33), Johnny Sauter (#43), Michael Faulk (#53), Casey Kingsland (#91)

- Matt Crafton suffered a 25-point penalty for an unapproved adjustment to his truck.

=== Toyota Tundra 200 ===
The Toyota Tundra 200 was held on August 13 at Nashville Superspeedway. Mike Skinner won the pole.

Top ten results

1. #17 - David Reutimann*
2. #1 - Ted Musgrave
3. #30 - Todd Bodine
4. #5 - Mike Skinner
5. #50 - Todd Kluever
6. #77 - Brendan Gaughan
7. #22 - Bill Lester
8. #23 - Johnny Benson
9. #04 - Bobby Hamilton
10. #14 - Rick Crawford

Failed to qualify: Roland Isaacs (#24), Wayne Edwards (#68)

- This was Reutimann's first and only Truck Series victory.

=== O'Reilly 200 presented by Valvoline Maxlife ===
The O'Reilly 200 presented by Valvoline Maxlife was held on August 24 at Bristol Motor Speedway. David Reutimann won the pole.

Top ten results

1. #5 - Mike Skinner*
2. #30 - Todd Bodine
3. #16 - Jack Sprague
4. #23 - Johnny Benson
5. #15 - Kyle Busch
6. #1 - Ted Musgrave
7. #2 - Jimmy Spencer
8. #75 - David Starr
9. #12 - Mike Wallace
10. #52 - Ken Schrader

Failed to qualify: Wayne Edwards (#24), Kelly Sutton (#02), Tam Topham (#70), Casey Kingsland (#91), Eric King (#00), Frank Wilson Jr. (#27)

- This was Skinner's first victory since returning to the Craftsman Truck Series in 2004, after spending 1997 to 2003 racing in the Cup Series.

=== Cheerios Betty Crocker 200 ===
The Cheerios Betty Crocker 200 was held on September 8 at Richmond International Raceway. David Starr won the pole.

Top ten results

1. #5 - Mike Skinner
2. #30 - Todd Bodine
3. #47 - Kevin Harvick
4. #1 - Ted Musgrave
5. #13 - Tracy Hines
6. #12 - Mike Wallace
7. #88 - Matt Crafton
8. #59 - Robert Pressley
9. #2 - Jimmy Spencer
10. #6 - Ron Hornaday Jr.

Failed to qualify: Tony Stewart (#92), Bobby East (#33), Ronnie Hornaday (#7), Mike Bliss (#06), Andy Houston (#40), Tam Topham (#70), Kelly Sutton (#02), Robbie Ferguson (#24), Craig Wood (#73)

=== Sylvania 200 presented by Lowe's ===
The Sylvania 200 presented by Lowe's was held on September 17 at New Hampshire International Speedway. Matt Crafton won the pole.

Top ten results

1. #14 - Rick Crawford
2. #46 - Dennis Setzer
3. #1 - Ted Musgrave
4. #65 - Clay Rogers
5. #6 - Ron Hornaday Jr.
6. #2 - Jimmy Spencer
7. #15 - Kyle Busch
8. #47 - Aric Almirola
9. #60 - Chad Chaffin
10. #77 - Brendan Gaughan

Failed to qualify: Frank Wilson Jr. (#27), J. C. Stout (#91)

=== Las Vegas 350 ===
The Las Vegas 350 was held September 24 at Las Vegas Motor Speedway. Mike Skinner won the pole.

Top ten results

1. #30 - Todd Bodine
2. #1 - Ted Musgrave
3. #75 - David Starr
4. #16 - Jack Sprague
5. #04 - Bobby Hamilton
6. #5 - Mike Skinner
7. #14 - Rick Crawford
8. #50 - Todd Kluever
9. #38 - Brandon Whitt
10. #65 - Tim Fedewa

Failed to qualify: none

=== Kroger 200 ===
The Kroger 200 was held October 22 at Martinsville Speedway. Rick Crawford won the pole.

Top ten results

1. #99 - Ricky Craven*
2. #50 - Todd Kluever
3. #38 - Brandon Whitt
4. #1 - Ted Musgrave*
5. #15 - Kyle Busch
6. #47 - Willie Allen
7. #10 - Terry Cook
8. #4 - Timothy Peters
9. #6 - Ron Hornaday Jr.
10. #30 - Todd Bodine

Failed to qualify: Kelly Sutton (#02), Frank Wilson Jr. (#27)

- This was Craven's first and only Truck Series victory, becoming the seventh and final driver in 2005 to have won a race in all three of NASCAR's top series in his career.
- Ted Musgrave finished 4th while Dennis Setzer finished 19th, allowing Musgrave to retake the championship points lead, and he would hold it for the rest of the season.

=== EasyCare Vehicle Service Contracts 200 ===
The EasyCare Vehicle Service Contracts 200 was held October 29 at Atlanta Motor Speedway. Mike Skinner won the pole,

Top ten results

1. #15 - Kyle Busch
2. #30 - Todd Bodine
3. #23 - Johnny Benson
4. #60 - Jack Sprague*
5. #47 - Bobby Labonte
6. #50 - Todd Kluever
7. #04 - Bobby Hamilton
8. #38 - Brandon Whitt
9. #99 - Ricky Craven
10. #12 - Joey Miller

Failed to qualify: John Mickel (#05), Kelly Sutton (#02), Justin Hobgood (#9), Clay Rogers (#44), Mark McFarland (#52), Wayne Edwards (#24)

- This race ended in chaotic fashion, with Jack Sprague spinning out while battling Kyle Busch for the lead in turn 4 on the last lap, resulting in the multi-truck crash involving Sprague, Bobby Labonte, Johnny Benson, Todd Kluever, David Starr, and Bobby Hamilton. All drivers escaped without serious injury.

=== Silverado 350K ===
The Silverado 350K was held November 4 at Texas Motor Speedway. Mike Skinner won the pole.

Top ten results

1. #30 - Todd Bodine
2. #5 - Mike Skinner
3. #15 - Kyle Busch
4. #75 - David Starr
5. #17 - David Reutimann
6. #16 - Jack Sprague
7. #6 - Ron Hornaday Jr.
8. #14 - Rick Crawford
9. #04 - Bobby Hamilton
10. #50 - Todd Kluever

Failed to qualify: Kelly Sutton (#02), Tim Fedewa (#65), Justin Hobgood (#9), Blake Mallory (#76), Wayne Edwards (#24)

=== Chevy Silverado 150 ===
The Chevy Silverado 150 was held November 11 at Phoenix International Raceway. Brandon Whitt won the pole.

Top ten results

1. #30 - Todd Bodine
2. #6 - Ron Hornaday Jr.
3. #23 - Johnny Benson
4. #14 - Rick Crawford
5. #46 - Dennis Setzer
6. #1 - Ted Musgrave*
7. #17 - David Reutimann
8. #88 - Matt Crafton
9. #5 - Mike Skinner
10. #16 - Mike Bliss

Failed to qualify: Frank Wilson Jr. (#27), Kelly Sutton (#02)

- Dennis Setzer finished one position ahead of Ted Musgrave, reducing Musgrave's points lead to 58 points entering the season finale at Homestead.

=== Ford 200 ===
The Ford 200 was held November 19 at Homestead-Miami Speedway due to rain. David Reutimann won the pole.

Top ten results

1. #30 - Todd Bodine
2. #60 - Jack Sprague
3. #23 - Johnny Benson
4. #26 - Mike Bliss
5. #22 - Bill Lester
6. #15 - Kyle Busch
7. #50 - Todd Kluever
8. #33 - Mark Martin
9. #6 - Ron Hornaday Jr.
10. #88 - Matt Crafton

Failed to qualify: Tim Fedewa (#65), Justin Allgaier (#63), Kelly Sutton (#02), Wayne Edwards (#24), Bobby East (#21)

- Ted Musgrave finished one position behind Dennis Setzer in 19th, allowing Musgrave to clinch the 2005 Craftsman Truck Series championship by 55 points over Setzer. The championship victory vindicated both Musgrave and Ultra Motorsports after their controversial defeat in the 2003 championship.
- This would be Ultra Motorsports' final race, as the team would shut down in early 2006 after a planned deal with Ford fell through.

== Full Drivers' Championship ==
(key) Bold – Pole position awarded by time. Italics – Pole position set by owner's points. * – Most laps led.

Pos	Driver	DAY	CAL	ATL	MAR	GTY	MFD	CLT	DOV	TEX	MCH	MIL	KAN	KEN	MEM	IRP	NSH	BRI	RCH	NHA	LVS	MAR	ATL	TEX	PHO	HOM	Points
1	Ted Musgrave	5	5	6	7	**1***	12	3	17	14	28	3	14	5	26	14	2	6	4	3	2	4	14	14	6	19	3535
2	Dennis Setzer	16	10	4	33	2	7	7	13	3	1*	1*	11	1	4	1*	14	16	34	2	14	19	13	18	5	18	3480
3	Todd Bodine	3*	36	12	4*	7	16	31	28	30	9	34	1*	2	23	15	3	2	2	22	1*	10	2*	1	1	1*	3462
4	Ron Hornaday Jr.	26	8	1	3	30	**11***	11	4*	6	30	4	17	14	21*	3	12	14	10	5*	13	9	21	7	2	9	3369
5	Mike Skinner	25	**18**	34	9	4	28	**26**	10	**4***	5	16	4	4	29	19	**4***	1*	1*	24	**6**	33	**12**	**2***	9	12	3273
6	Bobby Hamilton	1	2	3	**20**	6	1	28	21	17	3	6	12	31	6	13	9	31	24	30	5	14	7	9	17	31	3164
7	David Starr	8	27*	5	22	21	9	19	**8**	9	12	11	24	10	5	17	17	8	**21**	13	3	21	11	4	14	11	3148
8	Jack Sprague	13	22	8	11	20	2	27	29	1	10	**2**	30	36	13	9	21	3	26	15	4	29	4	6	16	2	3137
9	Matt Crafton	11	6	14	15	17	19	9	9	5	22	18	27	7	7	4	13	12	7	**35**	11	12	22	17	8	10	3095
10	Johnny Benson	10	12	11	17	11	23	4	34	2	24	35	28	9	9	16	8	4	13	32	33	15	3	13	3*	3	3076
11	Todd Kluever **(R)**	32	4	36	16	32	4	20	20	25	15	9	2	12	10	2	5	13	32	28	8	2	6	10	12	7	3074
12	Jimmy Spencer	2	7	17	8	3	14	12	24	21	14	12	6	11	22	5	16	7	9	6	31	27	23	24	33	14	3050
13	David Reutimann	12	13	24	23	24	21	17	5	10	8	23	3	3	2	11	1	**29**	17	33	12	34	33	5	7	**36**	2979
14	Ricky Craven	4	3	18	2	10	8	10	7	13	33	21	13	13	27	25	24	32	20	11	23	1*	9	21	32	21	2976
15	Terry Cook	20	15	9	10	23	31	2	3	7	13	10	7	25*	15	12	32	30	19	16	18	7	16	12	25	26	2936
16	Rick Crawford	36	14	**29***	21	5	6	25	11	19	6	8	10	QL	11	6	10	21	28	1	7	**16**	32	8	4	27	2917
17	Bill Lester	29	16	21	26	12	18	6	30	22	16	15	**5**	**22**	35	18	7	25	14	25	32	32	19	11	21	5	2672
18	Brandon Whitt	28	23	15	29	33	30	23	32	15	34	13	16	6	**1**	24	23	20	33	27	9	3	8	15	**19**	29	2602
19	Brendan Gaughan	30	21	DNQ	DNQ	22	15	8	16	27	11	5	8	29	3	8	6	36	11	10	35	24	15	32	23	16	2564
20	Robert Pressley	15	24	20	25	8	25	22	26	31	17	14	33	17	32	7	25	17	8	14	24	31	27	26	22	24	2493
21	Brad Keselowski	7	31	23	35	15	13	24	15	20	35	27	21	18	14	34	30	18	16	21	34	18	30	31	27	22	2367
22	Steve Park	23	1	35	24	13	20	5	36	16	31	7	32	8	12	30	15	15	18	12	30		34	16			2275
23	Chase Montgomery	31	29	26	30	19	24	13	18	33	20	33	20	34	25	22	22	22	22	34	19	20	31	19	26	23	2230
24	Deborah Renshaw	27	20	25	28	34	34	DNQ	12	18	21	24	26	19	24	27	26	27	35	20	25	26	24	20	31	25	2123
25	Tracy Hines	22	33	16	13	25	27	18	25	26	36	32	19	20	16	32	29	24	5	19	36	17	26	35			2108
26	Chad Chaffin	21	28	7	5	9	32	30	23	23	7	17	15	33	28	21	20	23	27	9	16				35		2068
27	Kyle Busch							1*	1		**2**							5	30	7		5	1*	3	11	6	1734
28	Timothy Peters **(R)**				18	16		32	6	32	25			28	18	28	33	19	29		26	8	18			15	1568
29	Kelly Sutton	17	26	31	27	28	26	15	31	29	DNQ	DNQ	31	26	20	31	36	DNQ	DNQ	29	28	DNQ	DNQ	DNQ	DNQ	DNQ	1315
30	Robert Huffman	19	9	10	19	35	33	21	35	28	19	31	18	30	31												1271
31	Ken Schrader				14			36	14		29					35		10	15	18		11			24		1013
32	Tim Fedewa															20	19	26			10	23	20	DNQ	13	DNQ	749
33	Wayne Edwards	9	34	33			35	DNQ	33				34	27			DNQ	DNQ		23		25	DNQ	DNQ	28	DNQ	731
34	Clay Rogers **(R)**							14		8	26		25			DNQ			12	4			DNQ				723
35	Shigeaki Hattori **(R)**	34	30	27	DNQ	27	36	34		35	27	DNQ		24			35										703
36	Bobby Labonte			2	1						32											22	5				679
37	Sean Murphy	24	19	13	31	29		29			18																657
38	Regan Smith **(R)**	33	32	DNQ		QL	22	35	22			20											29	33		32	640
39	Mike Wallace	DNQ														26	18	9	6	17							604
40	Joey Miller																				15		10	25	15	13	587
41	Mike Bliss		QL															11	DNQ				36	22	10	4	581
42	Shane Hmiel			32	6	14	3																				513
43	Chris Wimmer											22			17		34	35					17			33	504
44	Jack Bailey															29			31	26	17			36		28	477
45	Scott Lynch																					30	25	23	18	17	476
46	John Andretti												9		8	36	11										465
47	Rich Bickle					36	5		27			28					27										458
48	Aric Almirola														30	10				8				34			410
49	Jimmy Kite **(R)**			19		18		DNQ		24			22														403
50	Eric Norris					DNQ				12				32							20		35				360
51	Ken Weaver	6	35	28		31																					357
52	Casey Atwood	14	11	22																							348
53	Butch Miller						10	16								23											343
54	Mike Harmon	18	25	30	32			DNQ																			337
55	Kevin Harvick				12						4								3								335
56	Nick Tucker **(R)**				DNQ	26		DNQ				29		23				28									334
57	Johnny Chapman									36	23		35	21													317
58	Justin Allgaier				DNQ	DNQ						26	36	DNQ	DNQ						27			27		DNQ	304
59	Johnny Sauter									11						DNQ			36							20	288
60	Chris Fontaine						17					25	29														276
61	Tony Stewart							33	2										DNQ								234
62	Robert Richardson Jr.																				29			28		34	216
63	Willie Allen																					6			34		211
64	Alex Yontz						29					36			33		28										198
65	Burney Lamar																				21		28				179
66	Tam Topham				34										34			DNQ	DNQ			36					177
67	Kerry Earnhardt **(R)**	**35**	17																								175
68	Jarit Johnson																		25			28					167
69	Justin Hobgood																		23				DNQ	DNQ	20	35	152
70	Mark Martin																									8	147
71	J. C. Stout					DNQ						30					31			DNQ							143
72	José Luis Ramírez																			36					29		131
73	Darrell Waltrip				DNQ																	13					124
74	Blake Feese													15													118
75	T. J. Bell													16													115
76	Kevin Lepage								19																		106
77	Martin Truex Jr.											19															106
78	Brad Rogers														19												106
79	David Gilliland																				23						97
80	Kevin Hamlin												23														94
81	John Mickel																						DNQ	29			76
82	Mark McFarland																						DNQ	30			73
83	Bobby East															DNQ			DNQ						30	DNQ	73
84	Garrett Liberty																			31							70
85	Robbie Ferguson															33			DNQ								64
86	Andy Houston																	33	DNQ								64
87	Blake Mallory						DNQ			34	DNQ			DNQ										DNQ			61
88	Bill Manfull				DNQ													34									61
89	Boris Said													35													58
90	Chase Pistone																					35					58
91	Erin Crocker																								36	30	55
92	Casey Kingsland				36											DNQ		DNQ									55
93	Roland Isaacs														36		DNQ										55
94	Rick Markle	DNQ																									
95	J. R. Patton	DNQ																									
96	Jason Rudd	DNQ	DNQ																								
97	Derrike Cope	DNQ	DNQ	DNQ																							
98	David Ragan	DNQ						DNQ																			
99	Steve Grissom			DNQ																							
100	Joey McCarthy				DNQ																						
101	Eric King				DNQ													DNQ									
102	Shane Wallace					DNQ																					
103	Brandon Bendele					DNQ						DNQ															
104	Mike Osgar						DNQ																				
105	Kelly Thacker						DNQ																				
106	Jim Walker						DNQ								DNQ												
107	Sam Beam						DNQ								DNQ												
108	Frank Wilson Jr.						DNQ								DNQ	DNQ		DNQ		DNQ		DNQ			DNQ		
109	Tom Powers											DNQ															
110	Michael Faulk															DNQ											
111	Craig Wood																		DNQ								
112	Ronnie Hornaday																		DNQ								
Pos	Driver	DAY	CAL	ATL	MAR	GTY	MFD	CLT	DOV	TEX	MCH	MIL	KAN	KEN	MEM	IRP	NSH	BRI	RCH	NHA	LVS	MAR	ATL	TEX	PHO	HOM	Points

== Rookie of the Year ==
The 2005 NASCAR Craftsman Truck Series Rookie of the Year battle was virtually one-sided, as Todd Kluever of Roush Racing was the only candidate to attempt a full schedule, and he posted twelve top-tens, and three second-place finishes. Timothy Peters and Shigeaki Hattori were the only other drivers to fulfill the Rookie of the Year Award's requirement that drivers compete in at least eight of the first 20 races to be eligible. Peters had two top-tens, while Hattori struggled and was released from Germain Racing. Regan Smith was the only other rookie to run more than ten races, as Clay Rogers, Nick Tucker, Jimmy Kite, and Kerry Earnhardt saw their seasons end early.

== See also ==
- 2005 NASCAR Nextel Cup Series
- 2005 NASCAR Busch Series
- 2005 ARCA Re/Max Series
- 2005 NASCAR Whelen Modified Tour
- 2005 NASCAR Whelen Southern Modified Tour
