= David East =

David East may refer to:

- David East (police officer), former Chief Constable of South Wales and secretary of the Welsh Rugby Union
- David East (artist), American ceramic artist
- David East (cricketer) (born 1959), English cricketer
- David Warren East (born 1961), British businessman
