= 2007 AT&T 250 =

2007 NASCAR stock car race

Race details
- Race 17 of 35 of the 2007 NASCAR Busch Series season
- Map of the Milwaukee Mile
- Date: June 23, 2007
- Official name: AT&T 250
- Location: Milwaukee Mile in West Allis, Wisconsin, U.S.
- Course: Permanent racing facility
- Course length: 1.000 miles (1.609 km)
- Distance: 250 laps, 250.0 mi (402.25 km)
- Weather: Temperatures hovering between 66 °F (19 °C) and 55 °F (13 °C); wind speeds reaching up to 13.8 miles per hour (22.2 km/h)
- Average speed: 85.203 mph (137.121 km/h)

Pole position
Driver	Aric Almirola	Joe Gibbs Racing
- Time: 29.608

Most laps led
Driver	Carl Edwards	Roush Fenway Racing
- Laps: 123

Winner
No. 20	Aric Almirola	Joe Gibbs Racing

Television in the United States
- Network: ESPN2
- Announcers: Allen Bestwick, Rusty Wallace, Andy Petree

The 2007 AT&T 250 was a NASCAR Busch Series stock car race that took place on June 23, 2007. Held at the Milwaukee Mile in West Allis, Wisconsin, United States, the race was the 17th of 35 in the 2007 NASCAR Busch Series season. Aric Almirola of Joe Gibbs Racing (JGR) was the listed winner of the race, Richard Childress Racing's Scott Wimmer finished second, and Braun Racing's Jason Leffler finished third.

The race became controversial because of a driver change made by the No. 20 JGR team. Almirola qualified the car on pole position, though Gibbs intended to have NASCAR Nextel Cup Series regular Denny Hamlin run the race. The Cup Series was racing that weekend at Infineon Raceway in Sonoma, California, and Hamlin's helicopter could not find a landing spot at Milwaukee Mile in time for the start of the race. Almirola was thus forced to start the race and ran the first 59 laps before he was pulled out of the car under caution; Hamlin finished the race and came from behind to win after losing a lap to the leaders during the driver change. NASCAR rules say the driver who starts the race gets credit for the result, making Almirola the official race winner. The driver change frustrated Almirola, who proceeded to leave the track before the race ended, and it was further criticized by ESPN writer Terry Blount, who called the substitution "a Busch-league move".

The win for which Almirola was given credit was the first of his Busch Series career. Carl Edwards, who led nearly half of the race for Roush Fenway Racing (RFR), recovered from a flat tire to finish eighth, maintaining a significant lead in the Drivers' Championship. Edwards's No. 60 RFR team also maintained their Owners' Championship lead, and Chevrolet continued to lead the Manufacturers' Championship.

== Background ==
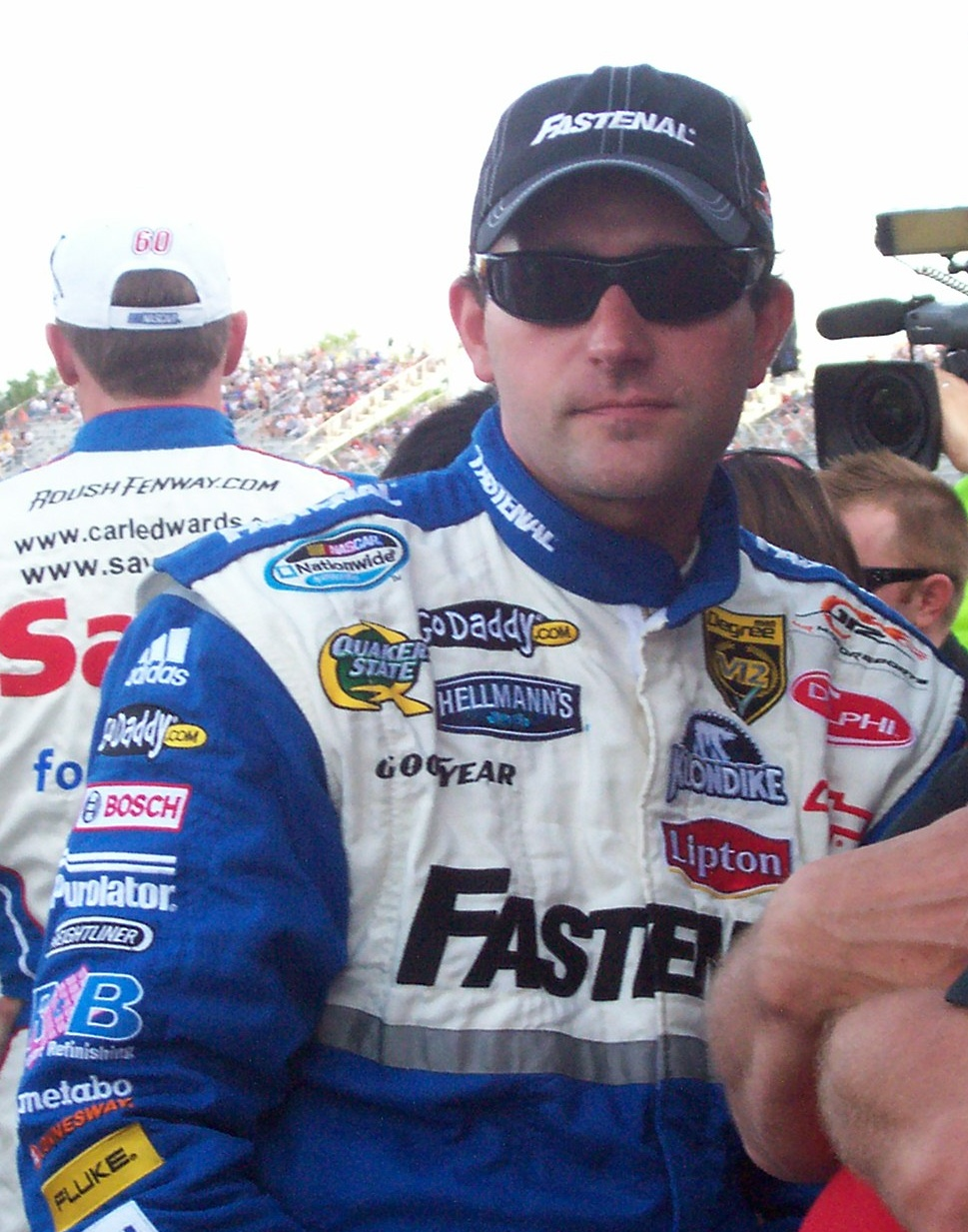
Wisconsin native Scott Wimmer (pictured in 2009) entered the race optimistic about performing well at his home track.

The Busch Series first came to the Milwaukee Mile in the 1984 and 1985 seasons before taking a seven-year absence from visiting the track. It returned to the schedule in 1993 and had been on the series calendar every year since then leading up to the 2007 edition of the race. The track itself was originally built as a horse racing track, and it later held its first automobile race in 1903, making it the oldest motor racing track in the United States.

Entering the race, the last two Busch Series races at Milwaukee had been won by Johnny Sauter and Paul Menard, both from Wisconsin. Four Wisconsin-born drivers entered the race hoping to continue the trend: Scott Wimmer, Todd Kluever, Kelly Bires, and Frank Kreyer. Wimmer, who entered the race with three consecutive top-five finishes and five straight top-tens, stated, "It's really exciting anytime I go back to Wisconsin for racing, especially The Milwaukee Mile. I've been going there since I can remember and watching a lot of great drivers racing out there." He also expressed excitement at the prospect of winning the upcoming race, saying, "It would really be neat to win a race there. I think that any Wisconsin driver, no matter what series, wants to win there."

Carl Edwards led the Drivers' Championship entering the race with 2,534 points. Dave Blaney followed in second with 1,833, while Kevin Harvick was third with 1,798. David Reutimann, Regan Smith, David Ragan, Greg Biffle, Marcos Ambrose, Bobby Hamilton Jr., and Jason Leffler rounded out the top ten. Jack Roush, owner of Edwards' No. 60 car, led the Owners' Championship, also with 2,534 points. Richard Childress's No. 29 team, shared by Wimmer and Jeff Burton, followed in second with 2,323, while Joe Gibbs's No. 20, Childress's No. 21, and DeLana Harvick's No. 33 teams completed the top-five. Chevrolet led the Manufacturers' Championship with 115 points; Ford, Dodge, and Toyota followed with 109, 69, and 59 respectively. Menard, the defending race winner, did not participate.

=== Standings before the race ===
Drivers' Championship standings
Rank	Driver	Points
1	Carl Edwards	2,534
2	Dave Blaney	1,833 (–701)
3	Kevin Harvick	1,798 (–736)
4	David Reutimann	1,764 (–770)
5	Regan Smith	1,744 (–790)
6	David Ragan	1,713 (–821)
7	Greg Biffle	1,647 (–887)
8	Marcos Ambrose	1,638 (–896)
9	Bobby Hamilton Jr.	1,629 (–905)
10	Jason Leffler	1,603 (–931)

Owners' Championship standings
Rank	Owner	No.	Points
1	Jack Roush	60	2,534
2	Richard Childress	29	2,323 (–211)
3	Joe Gibbs	20	2,092 (–442)
4	Richard Childress	21	1,979 (–555)
5	DeLana Harvick	33	1,912 (–622)

Manufacturers' Championship standings
Rank	Manufacturer	Points
1	Chevrolet	115
2	Ford	109 (–6)
3	Dodge	69 (–46)
4	Toyota	59 (–56)

- Note: Only the top ten and five positions are included for the driver and owner standings respectively.

== Report ==
=== Practice and qualifying ===
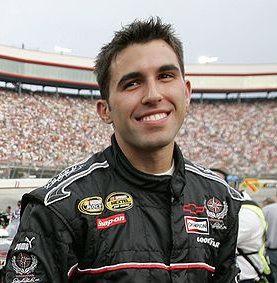
Aric Almirola qualified the car on pole position and was expected to hand the car over to Denny Hamlin for the race.

Two practice sessions were held in the morning and in the afternoon before the evening race. With a time of 29.981 seconds, Wimmer was the quickest in the opening session ahead of Aric Almirola, Stephen Leicht, Reutimann, and Shane Huffman. Positions six through ten were occupied by Hamilton, Erik Darnell, Travis Kvapil, Todd Bodine, and Kelly Bires. In the second practice session, Wimmer was once again quickest with a lap time of 29.821 seconds, followed by Almirola, Johnny Benson Jr., Brad Coleman, Jason Keller, Leffler, Darnell, Huffman, Scott Lagasse Jr., and Leicht.

Forty-four cars entered qualifying; due to NASCAR's qualifying procedure, only forty-three could race. Almirola qualified his No. 20 car on pole position with a time of 29.608 seconds. Almirola was set to step aside for the race, however, as Nextel Cup Series regular Denny Hamlin was scheduled to travel from Infineon Raceway in Sonoma, California to compete in the Saturday night event in Milwaukee. Almirola, who also qualified Hamlin's car on the pole the year before, commented, "Man, two poles in a row at Milwaukee and I don't get to race. Something's got to be set for that. I'll sit on the pit box and watch. I've got a lot to learn about racing these Busch cars and Denny is really, really good, so I'll just sit there and listen and learn all I can from Denny."

Almirola was joined on the front row by Leffler, while Wimmer, Coleman, and Huffman rounded out the top-five qualifiers. Bodine, Benson, Reutimann, Edwards, and Lagasse made up positions six through ten. Danny Efland was the only driver who failed to qualify as he did not set a qualifying time. Edwards replaced Kvapil in the No. 60 car after practice, qualifying in ninth. Like Hamlin, Edwards was also traveling from Sonoma and nearly missed qualifying, later remarking, "One minute later, we wouldn't have made it."

=== Race ===
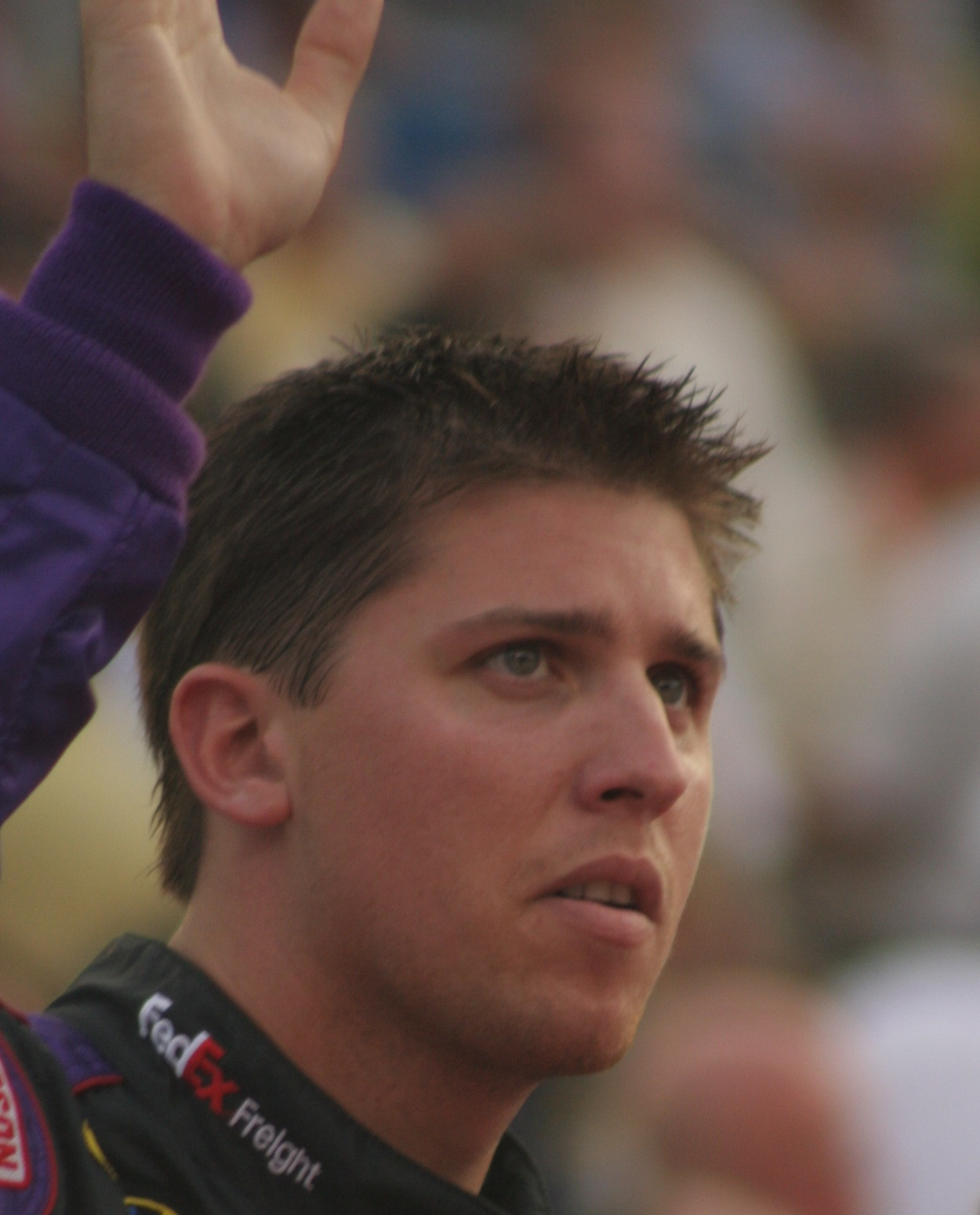
Denny Hamlin stepped into Almirola's car on lap 59 and proceeded to win the race.

The 250-lap race began at 8:00 p.m. EDT, and was televised live in the United States on ESPN2. Hamlin's helicopter could not find a place to land in the infield; the helicopter pad was blocked by parked cars, forcing Hamlin to land elsewhere and arrive late via ground transportation. Hamlin was thus unable to start the race in Almirola's car, forcing Almirola to start the race himself. Ragan, the third Nextel Cup regular traveling to the track from Sonoma along with Hamlin and Edwards, replaced Darnell in Roush's No. 6 car; Ragan was forced to move to the rear of the field because of the driver swap and an engine change, as was Chase Miller who went to a backup car.

Almirola maintained his lead from pole position for the first 43 laps before being passed by Edwards. The caution had been displayed on lap 30 due to oil on the track in turn four, and shortly after the lap 43 restart, Edwards took over the lead of the race. On lap 57, Ron Hornaday Jr. was involved in an accident, prompting another caution period. It was under this caution period that the Gibbs team elected to make the driver change, and Hamlin took over driving the car for the remainder of the race.

Hamlin lost a lap and fell to 34th place, remaining a lap down until lap 149 when he received the free pass, allowing him to return to the lead lap. Edwards continued to lead the race for a total of 123 laps, before Mike Wallace assumed the race lead. Six laps later, on lap 173, Hamlin completed his comeback drive to retake the lead for the No. 20 team. Edwards, meanwhile, suffered misfortune in the form of a flat right rear tire around the same period in the race, forcing him to pit with 77 laps remaining.

On lap 223, Kreyer was involved in an accident, causing the caution to be displayed again. Wimmer assumed the lead after pit stops, holding it until the caution came out again for Kevin Hamlin's accident. On the restart, Wimmer battled for the lead with Leffler, while Hamlin made it three-wide to retake the lead with thirteen laps to go. Marc Mitchell, Richard Johns, and Brent Sherman crashed on lap 244, requiring another caution to be displayed. The race restarted with four laps remaining, with Hamlin retaining the lead to the finish. Since NASCAR rules credit the finishing position to the starting driver, Almirola was awarded the win. Wimmer, Leffler, and Coleman followed in second through fourth, while Keller, Bodine, Reutimann, Edwards, Benson, and Huffman completed the top-ten. Hamlin's margin of victory over Wimmer was .502 seconds.

=== Post-race comments ===
"I didn't want to do it. I knew he would be really upset."

— Hamlin after the race, explaining his hesitancy to get in the car

Hamlin appeared in Victory Lane to represent Almirola's first career win in front of a crowd of 41,900 attendants, earning $66,823 for the victory; both the win and the prize money were credited to Almirola, while team president J. D. Gibbs confirmed that Almirola would receive the winner's check. Hamlin credited Almirola for putting the team in a good position prior to the race, saying Almirola "did all the hard work". Runner-up Wimmer was taken aback that Gibbs elected to make the driver change: "I was surprised they did it, because Aric was running a good race." He also believed fewer caution periods may have given him a better chance to win the race, saying, "I just drove as hard as I could, and unfortunately we weren't as good on the short runs. We'd get going after twenty laps, and I didn't need those cautions. Maybe we'll get a win one day. Maybe we won't. I don't know." Gibbs explained that Almirola was frustrated after being taken out of the car: "He's upset. I left a message for him [Saturday] night. I know he's upset. I would be too if I'm in his shoes." He also expressed relief that Hamlin was able to win the race, arguing, "Thank goodness he won. It would have looked bad if he didn't."

When explaining why the team made the decision to put Hamlin in the car, Gibbs said, "I told those guys as a group, if you think Denny can get in the car and win the race, let's go. Let's do that. If you don't think he can do that, let Aric run it out. Our guys kind of thought about it as a group and said, 'OK, we think Denny can run well and we're fast enough to win the race.' That was a huge discouragement of course to Aric." Other reasons included sponsorship obligations with Rockwell Automation, which sponsored the No. 20 car. Coleman, a Joe Gibbs Racing teammate, believed, "That might have had something to do with it." Almirola also expressed his belief that Rockwell, who are headquartered in Wisconsin, wanted Hamlin to drive during the race. "I totally understand the Gibbs side of the situation. You need that Cup superstar to sell sponsorship. It's not easy to sell sponsorship for somebody who hasn't proven themselves yet, and I understand that. At the time, in the heat of the moment, I was deep in the battle of the race. I didn't totally agree and understand the situation. But looking back on it now, I understand it. Rockwell's invested a lot in Denny Hamlin and Joe Gibbs Racing, so they deserved everything they got there at Milwaukee. They deserved to have their racecar in the spotlight and I was happy that I got the pole for them and that Denny won the race." He also said he did not consider himself to have won his first career race. "I feel like I was a part of it, but by no way, shape or form do I feel like that was my first victory. I feel like my first victory is still to come and I'll actually be in the car when it crosses the start-finish line for that one."

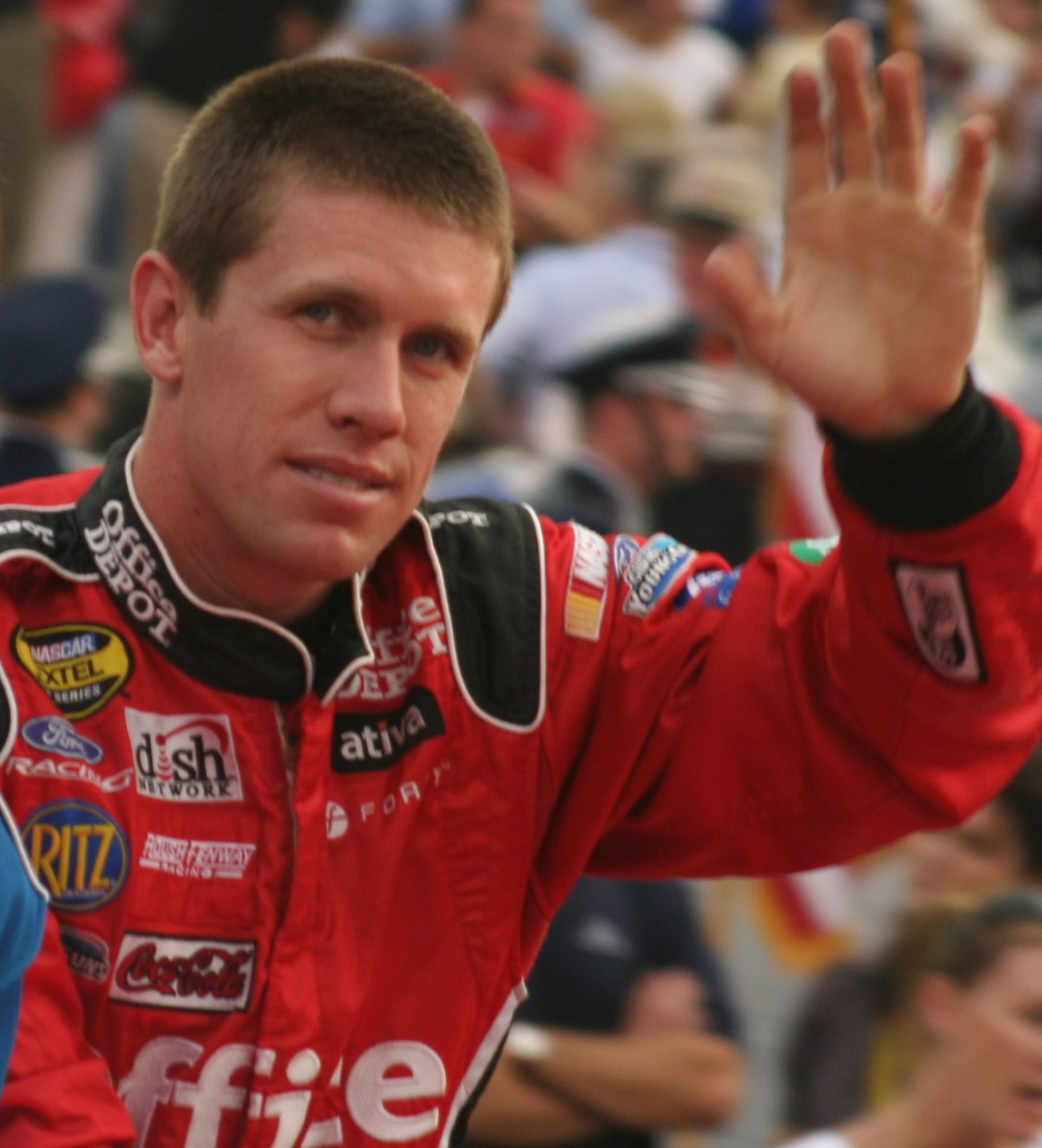
Carl Edwards remained the Drivers' Championship leader after the race with 2,686 points.

The driver change also attracted criticism from ESPN journalist Terry Blount, who called it "a Busch-league move", writing: "As if we don't have enough Cup dominance in the Busch Series, now they're replacing Busch drivers after a race starts." He continued, "Almirola was furious. Good for him. He should be furious. If a driver isn't angry about getting pulled from the car in the middle of a race, then he needs to take up another profession."

Edwards, who led the most laps and recovered to finish eighth after dominating the early stages of the race, insisted the night was "still fun", saying: "It was pretty frustrating. But you know what's cool? We raced hard and we had a lot of fun racing here at Milwaukee. Congratulations to Denny Hamlin. I can't believe they did a driver switch and he still won the race; that's pretty awesome ... we just kind of had a bad luck night."

The result kept Edwards in the lead in the Drivers' Championship with a new total of 2,686 points. Reutimann and Ragan improved their positions to second and third (albeit 776 and 846 points behind) respectively, while Blaney and Kevin Harvick fell to fourth and fifth. Leffler, Ambrose, Hamilton, Smith, and Leicht rounded out the top ten. Roush's No. 60 team also maintained the lead in a much closer Owners' Championship with 2,686 points; Wimmer's strong second-place finish left Childress's No. 29 team only 188 points behind Roush, while Gibbs's No. 20, Childress's No. 21, and DeLana Harvick's No. 33 remained third, fourth, and fifth. Chevrolet maintained their lead in the Manufacturers' Championship with 124 points; Ford, Dodge, and Toyota followed with 113, 72, and 65 respective points.

== Results ==
=== Qualifying ===
Qualifying results
Grid	No.	Driver	Team	Manufacturer	Time	Speed
1	20	Aric Almirola	Joe Gibbs Racing	Chevrolet	29.608	121.589
2	38	Jason Leffler	Braun Racing	Toyota	29.613	121.568
3	29	Scott Wimmer	Richard Childress Racing	Chevrolet	29.642	121.449
4	18	Brad Coleman	Joe Gibbs Racing	Chevrolet	29.675	121.314
5	88	Shane Huffman	JR Motorsports	Chevrolet	29.718	121.139
6	10	Todd Bodine	Braun Racing	Toyota	29.777	120.899
7	1	Johnny Benson Jr.	Phoenix Racing	Chevrolet	29.797	120.817
8	99	David Reutimann	Michael Waltrip Racing	Toyota	29.824	120.708
9	60	Carl Edwards	Roush Fenway Racing	Ford	29.835	120.664
10	41	Scott Lagasse Jr.	Chip Ganassi Racing	Dodge	29.866	120.538
11	35	Bobby Hamilton Jr.	Team Rensi Motorsports	Ford	29.901	120.397
12	59	Marcos Ambrose	JTG Racing	Ford	29.924	120.305
13	6	Erik Darnell	Roush Fenway Racing	Ford	29.952	120.192
14	47	Kelly Bires	JTG Racing	Ford	29.952	120.192
15	90	Stephen Leicht	Robert Yates Racing	Ford	29.971	120.116
16	66	Steve Wallace	Rusty Wallace Racing	Dodge	29.980	120.080
17	37	Bobby East	Brewco Motorsports	Ford	30.018	119.928
18	22	Mike Bliss	Fitz Motorsports	Dodge	30.026	119.896
19	9	Chase Miller	Evernham Motorsports	Dodge	30.050	119.800
20	7	Mike Wallace	Phoenix Racing	Chevrolet	30.059	119.765
21	27	Jason Keller	Brewco Motorsports	Ford	30.111	119.558
22	42	Kevin Hamlin	Chip Ganassi Racing	Dodge	30.181	119.280
23	16	Todd Kluever	Roush Fenway Racing	Ford	30.201	119.201
24	21	Tim McCreadie	Richard Childress Racing	Chevrolet	30.202	119.197
25	25	Richard Johns	Team Rensi Motorsports	Ford	30.207	119.178
26	70	Mark Green	ML Motorsports	Chevrolet	30.233	119.075
27	77	Ron Hornaday Jr.	Kevin Harvick Incorporated	Chevrolet	30.234	119.071
28	33	Cale Gale	Kevin Harvick Incorporated	Chevrolet	30.238	119.055
29	14	Kyle Krisiloff	Carl A. Haas Motorsports	Ford	30.260	118.969
30	36	Brent Sherman	McGill Motorsports	Chevrolet	30.368	118.546
31	11	Marc Mitchell	CJM Racing	Chevrolet	30.606	117.624
32	56	Frank Kreyer	Mac Hill Motorsports	Chevrolet	30.712	117.218
33	72	D. J. Kennington	MacDonald Motorsports	Dodge	30.800	116.883
34	49	Derrike Cope	Jay Robinson Racing	Chevrolet	30.879	116.584
35	0	Eric McClure	D.D.L. Motorsports	Chevrolet	30.889	116.546
36	44	Mike Harmon	Mike Harmon Racing	Chevrolet	31.194	115.407
37	89	Morgan Shepherd	Faith Motorsports	Dodge	31.763	115.339
38	28	Robert Richardson Jr.	Jay Robinson Racing	Chevrolet	31.953	112.665
39	52	Ian Henderson	Jimmy Means Racing	Ford	32.201	111.798
40	71	Trevor Boys	MacDonald Motorsports	Chevrolet	32.493	110.793
41	76	Jerick Johnson	Team Johnson Racing	Chevrolet	32.613	110.385
42	58	Chris Horn	Horn Auto Racing	Chevrolet	32.616	110.375
43	00	Mike Potter	Davis Motorsports	Chevrolet	32.674	110.179
Failed to qualify
44	01	Danny Efland	D.D.L. Motorsports	Chevrolet	No time set	

=== Race results ===
Race results
Pos.	Grid	No.	Driver	Team	Manufacturer	Laps	Points
1	1	20	Aric Almirola^{1}	Joe Gibbs Racing	Chevrolet	250	190^{2}
2	3	29	Scott Wimmer	Richard Childress Racing	Chevrolet	250	175^{2}
3	2	38	Jason Leffler	Braun Racing	Toyota	250	165
4	4	18	Brad Coleman	Joe Gibbs Racing	Chevrolet	250	160
5	21	27	Jason Keller	Brewco Motorsports	Ford	250	155
6	6	10	Todd Bodine	Braun Racing	Toyota	250	150
7	8	99	David Reutimann	Michael Waltrip Racing	Toyota	250	146
8	9	60	Carl Edwards	Roush Fenway Racing	Ford	250	152^{3}
9	7	1	Johnny Benson Jr.	Phoenix Racing	Chevrolet	250	138
10	5	88	Shane Huffman	JR Motorsports	Chevrolet	250	134
11	20	7	Mike Wallace	Phoenix Racing	Chevrolet	250	135^{2}
12	13	6	David Ragan	Roush Fenway Racing	Ford	250	127
13	11	35	Bobby Hamilton Jr.	Team Rensi Motorsports	Ford	250	124
14	15	90	Stephen Leicht	Robert Yates Racing	Ford	250	121
15	12	59	Marcos Ambrose	JTG Racing	Ford	250	118
16	22	42	Kevin Hamlin	Chip Ganassi Racing	Dodge	250	115
17	19	9	Chase Miller	Evernham Motorsports	Dodge	249	112
18	23	16	Todd Kluever	Roush Fenway Racing	Ford	249	109
19	25	25	Richard Johns	Team Rensi Motorsports	Ford	249	106
20	31	11	Marc Mitchell	CJM Racing	Chevrolet	249	103
21	26	70	Mark Green	ML Motorsports	Chevrolet	248	100
22	17	37	Bobby East	Brewco Motorsports	Ford	248	97
23	28	33	Cale Gale	Kevin Harvick Incorporated	Chevrolet	248	94
24	29	14	Kyle Krisiloff	Carl A. Haas Motorsports	Ford	248	91
25	18	22	Mike Bliss	Fitz Motorsports	Dodge	247	88
26	33	72	D. J. Kennington	MacDonald Motorsports	Dodge	247	85
27	16	66	Steve Wallace	Rusty Wallace Racing	Dodge	246	82
28	24	21	Tim McCreadie	Richard Childress Racing	Chevrolet	241	79
29	40	71	Trevor Boys	MacDonald Motorsports	Chevrolet	241	76
30	14	47	Kelly Bires	JTG Racing	Ford	241	73
31	35	0	Eric McClure	D.D.L. Motorsports	Chevrolet	238	70
32	30	36	Brent Sherman	McGill Motorsports	Chevrolet	236	67
33	38	28	Robert Richardson Jr.	Jay Robinson Racing	Chevrolet	232	64
34	32	56	Frank Kreyer	Mac Hill Motorsports	Chevrolet	217	61
35	10	41	Scott Lagasse Jr.	Chip Ganassi Racing	Dodge	163	58
36	27	77	Ron Hornaday Jr.	Kevin Harvick Incorporated	Chevrolet	56	55
37	39	52	Ian Henderson	Jimmy Means Racing	Ford	29	52
38	36	44	Mike Harmon	Mike Harmon Racing	Chevrolet	10	49
39	37	89	Morgan Shepherd	Faith Motorsports	Ford	9	46
40	42	58	Chris Horn	Horn Auto Racing	Chevrolet	4	43
41	41	76	Jerick Johnson	Team Johnson Racing	Chevrolet	4	40
42	43	00	Mike Potter	Davis Motorsports	Chevrolet	4	37
43	34	49	Derrike Cope	Jay Robinson Racing	Chevrolet	0	34
^{1} Denny Hamlin relieved Almirola on lap 59; due to NASCAR rules, Almirola was given credit for the finish
^{2} Includes five bonus points for leading a lap
^{3} Includes ten bonus points for leading the most laps

== Standings after the race ==
Drivers' Championship standings
Rank	+/–	Driver	Points
1		Carl Edwards	2,686
2	2	David Reutimann	1,910 (–776)
3	3	David Ragan	1,840 (–846)
4	2	Dave Blaney	1,833 (–853)
5	2	Kevin Harvick	1,798 (–888)
6	4	Jason Leffler	1,768 (–918)
7	1	Marcos Ambrose	1,756 (–930)
8	1	Bobby Hamilton Jr.	1,753 (–933)
9	4	Regan Smith	1,744 (–942)
10	1	Stephen Leicht	1,696 (–990)

Owners' Championship standings
Rank	+/–	Owner	No.	Points
1		Jack Roush	60	2,686
2		Richard Childress	29	2,498 (–188)
3		Joe Gibbs	20	2,282 (–404)
4		Richard Childress	21	2,058 (–628)
5		DeLana Harvick	33	2,006 (–670)

Manufacturers' Championship standings
Rank	+/–	Manufacturer	Points
1		Chevrolet	124
2		Ford	113 (–11)
3		Dodge	72 (–52)
4		Toyota	65 (–59)

- Note: Only the top ten and five positions are included for the driver and owner standings respectively.
