= Robert East =

Robert East may refer to:

- Robert East (actor) (born 1943), Welsh actor, known for playing Harry, Prince of Wales in British TV series Blackadder
- Bobby East (1984–2022), Robert East, racing driver
