= Deborah Renshaw =

American racing driver

Deborah Renshaw-Parker
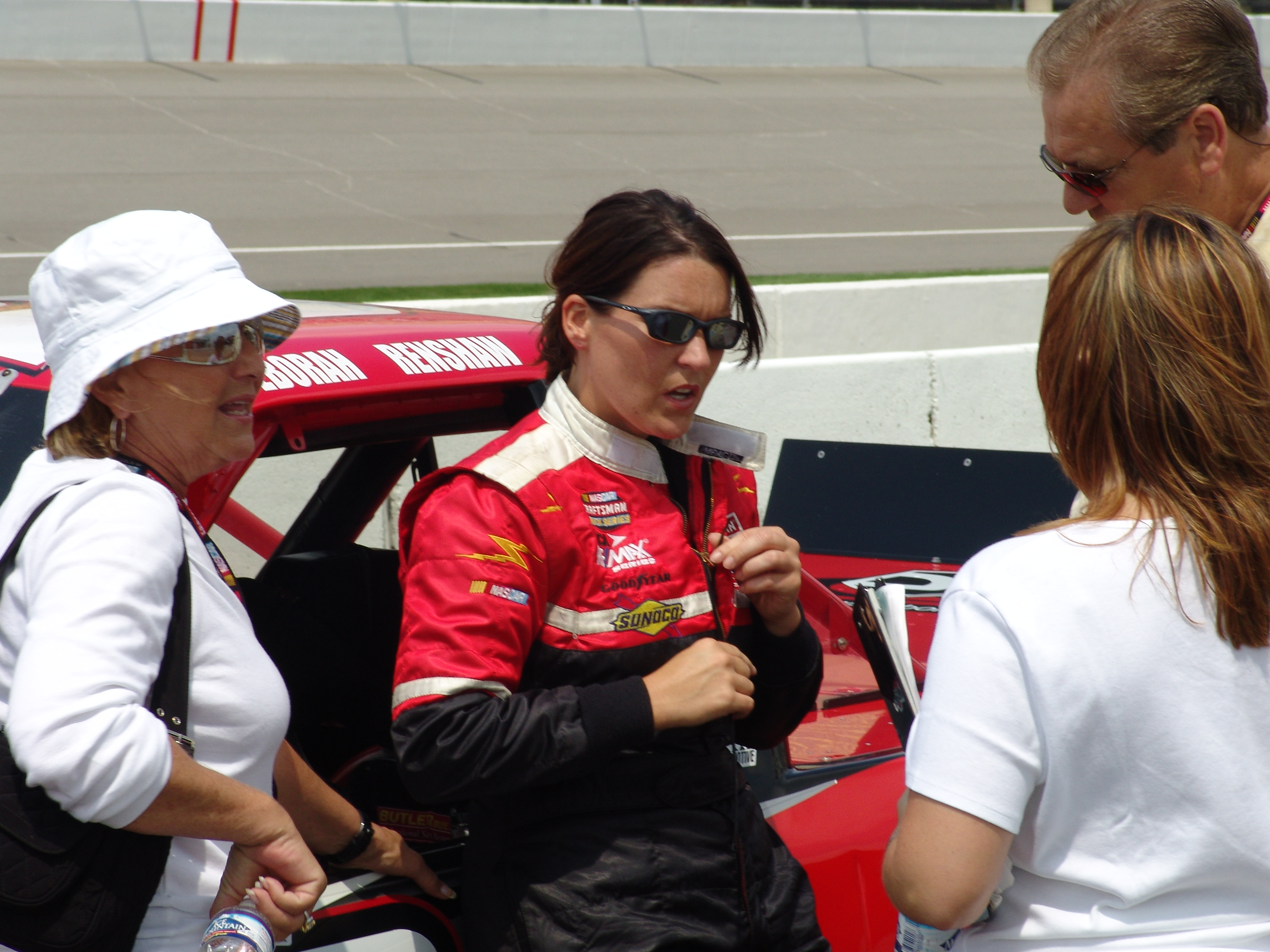
- Renshaw in 2004 at Michigan International Speedway
- Born: Deborah Renshaw; October 28, 1975 (age 51); Bowling Green, Kentucky, U.S.

NASCAR FedEx Freight Truck Series career
- 38 races run over 2 years
- 2005 position: 24th
- Best finish: 24th (2005)
- First race: 2004 Built Ford Tough 225 (Kentucky)
- Last race: 2005 Ford 200 (Homestead)
Wins	Top tens	Poles
0	0	0
- Statistics up to date as of February 27, 2007.

Deborah Renshaw-Parker (born October 28, 1975) is an American former NASCAR Craftsman Truck Series driver.

== Background and family life ==
Renshaw grew up in Bowling Green, Kentucky and has two brothers. She raced and drove in several types of motor vehicles (motorcycles, ATVs, and eventually Legends cars). She attended a 1996 driving school for Legends at Charlotte and at performance driving schools in Charlotte and Atlanta in 1998. Renshaw graduated from Northwood University in 1997 with a bachelor's degree in Business and an associate degree in Automotive Marketing. She began racing in the Late Model Stock class at Highland Rim Speedway finishing second the 1999 Rookie of the Year standings.

== Pre-CTS ==
Renshaw first participated in NASCAR when she began racing in the NASCAR Dodge Weekly Series in 2000. In two seasons, she finished in the top 10 three times and also set a qualifying record when she won the pole at Riverview Speedway. She also became the first woman to ever lead a NASCAR sanctioned series at Nashville Fairgrounds Speedway in 2002. Later that summer, she gained the spotlight when some fellow drivers entered a car in a race for the sole purpose of finishing behind her so her car could be protested. She sat out the next two races but resumed the season and ended up finishing tenth in the race for the track championship.

According to the book Along For The Ride by Larry Woody (Chapter "Lap XIX: Women, Wendell and Willie"), "[Mark] Day admitted early on that he was not convinced that women belonged on a race track" but that his problem was not with Renshaw because she was female, instead because she was a "bad driver." The protest covered both Renshaw and her male teammate Chevy White. Woody noted that track promoter Dennis Glau had "gotten wind of the scheme prior to the race" and contacted NASCAR, who instructed him to disallow the protest. Her father Dan Renshaw, however, felt there was nothing to lose and allowed officials to search the engine. A minor violation was found and her car was declared illegal.

Renshaw would spend the 2002 season in the ARCA RE/MAX Series, where she finished in the top ten three times. However, during her tenure there, she was involved in an accident that claimed the life of fellow driver Eric Martin, another controversial event during her career. After Martin had originally spun out during a practice session in Charlotte, he was alive and talking to his crew over the radio. Three cars that approached Martin's car were unaware that he was there because their spotters were not in the stands; however, they avoided Martin's car as it slowly rolled across the track and into the wall. Nearly fifteen seconds after it came to rest Renshaw, also without a spotter, collided with him at full speed, causing Martin's death. The incident prompted a mandate for spotters whenever their driver was on the track in NASCAR and ARCA.

== Craftsman Truck Series ==
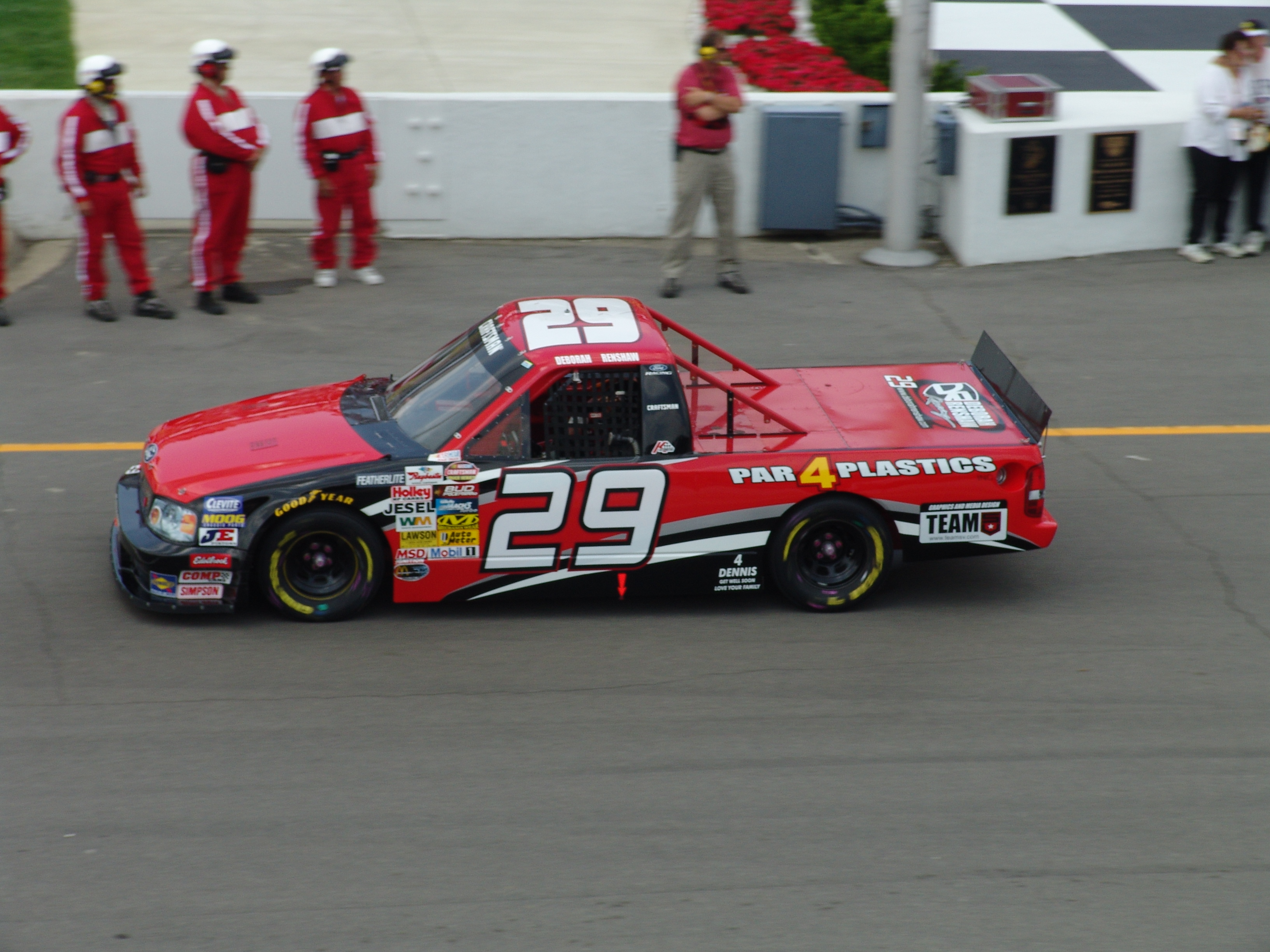
The number 29 truck in 2004 @ Michigan International Speedway.

Renshaw ran in 14 of the last 15 races of the 2004 NASCAR Craftsman Truck Series season, driving the #29 Ford F-150 for K-Automotive Motorsports. Although she finished no higher than 15th in any race, she became the first woman to ever lead a race in the series when she led one lap in the Darlington 200. Renshaw joined Bobby Hamilton Racing's driver development program in December 2004. Replacing Chase Montgomery in the No. 8, Renshaw became the first woman to ever attempt a complete schedule in one of NASCAR's three premier series, missing only one race in the 2005 season. She had two top-ten starts, the highest being eighth at Nashville Superspeedway in August. Her final position in the points standings was 24th.

Afterwards, Renshaw's future with Bobby Hamilton Racing (BHR) was unknown. BHR was forced to search for a replacement for EasyCare, who pulled out as the primary sponsor. Furthermore, the team announced Bobby Hamilton Jr. was going to run a limited schedule in the truck for the 2006 season, with Montgomery returning for the first race at Daytona; no plans for Renshaw were announced. Finally, on February 1, 2006, The Tennessean reported the pullout by EasyCare cost Deborah her ride at Bobby Hamilton Racing, which effectively ended her racing career. In November 2006, she married NASCAR crew chief Shawn Parker.

== Motorsports career results ==
=== NASCAR ===
(key) (Bold – Pole position awarded by qualifying time. Italics – Pole position earned by points standings or practice time. * – Most laps led.)

==== Craftsman Truck Series ====
NASCAR Craftsman Truck Series results
Year	Team	No.	Make	1	2	3	4	5	6	7	8	9	10	11	12	13	14	15	16	17	18	19	20	21	22	23	24	25	NCTC	Pts	Ref
2004	K-Automotive Motorsports	29	Ford	DAY	ATL	MAR	MFD	CLT	DOV	TEX	MEM	MLW	KAN	KEN; 25	GTW	MCH; 22	IRP; 33	NSH; 27	BRI; 36	RCH; 32	NHA; 22	LVS; 32	CAL; 23	TEX; 34	MAR; 15	PHO; 28	DAR; 30	HOM; 20	30th	1150	
2005	BHR2	8	Dodge	DAY; 27	CAL; 20	ATL; 25	MAR; 28	GTY; 34	MFD; 34	CLT; DNQ	DOV; 12	TEX; 18	MCH; 21	MLW; 24	KAN; 26	KEN; 19	MEM; 24	IRP; 27	NSH; 26	BRI; 27	RCH; 35	NHA; 20	LVS; 25	MAR; 26	ATL; 24	TEX; 20	PHO; 31	HOM; 25	24th	2123	

=== ARCA Re/Max Series ===
(key) (Bold – Pole position awarded by qualifying time. Italics – Pole position earned by points standings or practice time. * – Most laps led.)

ARCA Re/Max Series results
Year	Team	No.	Make	1	2	3	4	5	6	7	8	9	10	11	12	13	14	15	16	17	18	19	20	21	22	23	ARSC	Pts	Ref
2002	Bob Schacht Motorsports	75	Ford	DAY	ATL	NSH	SLM	KEN	CLT	KAN	POC	MCH	TOL	SBO	KEN; 8	BLN	POC; 11	NSH; 7	ISF	WIN	DSF	CHI; 9	SLM	TAL; 11	CLT; Wth		27th	1195	
2003	Bob Schacht Motorsports	75	Ford	DAY; 24	ATL	NSH; 38			KEN; 33	CLT	BLN	KAN	MCH	LER	POC	POC	NSH	ISF	WIN	DSF	CHI	SLM	TAL	CLT	SBO		78th	340	
2003	Ray Montgomery Racing	27	Chevy				SLM; 21	TOL																			78th	340	
2004	Braun Racing	64	Dodge	DAY; QL^{†}	NSH	SLM	KEN	TOL	CLT	KAN	POC	MCH	SBO	BLN	KEN	GTW	POC	LER	NSH	ISF	TOL	DSF	CHI	SLM	TAL		N/A	-	
2007	Bob Schacht Motorsports	75	Ford	DAY	USA	NSH	SLM	KAN	WIN	KEN	TOL	IOW	POC	MCH	BLN	KEN	POC	NSH; 26	ISF	MIL	GTW	DSF	CHI	SLM	TAL	TOL	148th	100	
^{†} – Qualified but replaced by Chad Blount.
