= Alex Yontz =

American racing driver

- Born: Alexander Kenneth Yontz; July 13, 1986 (age 40); Walnut Cove, North Carolina, U.S.
- Achievements: 2006 ValleyStar Credit Union 300 winner

NASCAR FedEx Freight Truck Series career
- 4 races run over 1 year
- 2005 position: 64th
- Best finish: 64th (2005)
- First race: 2005 UAW/GM Ohio 250 (Mansfield)
- Last race: 2005 Toyota Tundra 200 (Nashville)
Wins	Top tens	Poles
0	0	0
- Statistics up to date as of February 25, 2023.

Alexander Kenneth Yontz (born July 13, 1986) is an American professional stock car racing crew chief and former driver who works for Kaulig Racing as the crew chief of their No. 10 Ram 1500 driven by Corey LaJoie. He also previously crew chiefed Kaulig's No. 16 car in the NASCAR Xfinity Series, driven by Christian Eckes, No. 11 car in the Xfinity Series, driven by Justin Haley and Daniel Hemric, and their No. 10 car driven by multiple drivers, as well as Kaulig's No. 25 truck from February to July 2026.

== Racing career ==
=== Crew chiefing career ===
Yontz began crew chiefing in the Xfinity Series midway through 2019 after the unexpected death of Nick Harrison, the crew chief of Kaulig Racing's No. 11 car driven by Justin Haley. He continued in that role in 2020 and 2021. When Haley moved up to Kaulig's new No. 31 car in the Cup Series in 2022, Yontz did not move up with him and he continued to crew chief the No. 11 car in the Xfinity Series, now driven by Daniel Hemric.

On September 9, 2022, it was announced that Yontz would be switching cars, moving from the No. 11 of Hemric to the No. 10 of Landon Cassill starting with the race at Kansas the next day. Both the No. 10 and No. 11 cars had struggled during the season compared to Kaulig's No. 16 car driven by A. J. Allmendinger and were close to the bottom of the playoff grid and in danger of falling out. (Even after the crew chief swap, Cassill's No. 10 car ended up missing the playoffs.) Jason Trinchere, who was the crew chief of Cassill's No. 10 car, switched cars with Yontz and became the crew chief for Hemric's No. 11 car. Yontz continued as crew chief of the No. 10 car in 2023 when it was driven by multiple drivers.

On December 19, 2023, Kaulig announced that Yontz would move from their No. 10 car to their No. 16 car in 2024 where he would crew chief A. J. Allmendinger, who returned to the Xfinity Series full-time after 1 year of running full-time in the Cup Series for the team. On December 19, 2024, the team confirmed that Yontz would return to the No. 16 car in 2025 with new driver Christian Eckes as Allmendinger moved back up to the Cup Series full-time for Kaulig.

In 2026, Kaulig closed down their Xfinity Series (now O'Reilly Auto Parts Series) program while they started a NASCAR Craftsman Truck Series program with Ram Trucks as the manufacturer, who re-entered NASCAR after having left after the 2012 season. Yontz would move to crew chief one of the new Kaulig trucks, the No. 25, driven by a rotation of noteworthy NASCAR stars as part of the "Free Agent" program, starting with Tony Stewart at Daytona. On July 9, 2026, Kaulig Racing announced that Yontz would switch trucks with Dan Stillman starting at Lime Rock Park. Yontz would move to their No. 10 truck driven by Corey LaJoie and Stillman would now crew chief the No. 25.

== Motorsports career results ==
=== NASCAR ===
(key) (Bold – Pole position awarded by qualifying time. Italics – Pole position earned by points standings or practice time. * – Most laps led.)

==== Craftsman Truck Series ====
NASCAR Craftsman Truck Series results
Year	Team	No.	Make	1	2	3	4	5	6	7	8	9	10	11	12	13	14	15	16	17	18	19	20	21	22	23	24	25	NCTC	Pts	Ref
2005	Alex Yontz Racing	61	Chevy	DAY	CAL	ATL	MAR	GTY	MFD; 29	CLT	DOV	TEX	MCH	MLW; 36	KAN	KEN	MEM; 33	IRP	NSH; 28	BRI	RCH	NHA	LVS	MAR	ATL	TEX	PHO	HOM	64th	198	

=== ARCA Re/Max Series ===
(key) (Bold – Pole position awarded by qualifying time. Italics – Pole position earned by points standings or practice time. * – Most laps led.)

ARCA Re/Max Series results
Year	Team	No.	Make	1	2	3	4	5	6	7	8	9	10	11	12	13	14	15	16	17	18	19	20	21	22	23	ARSC	Pts	Ref
2007	Richard Childress Racing	31	Chevy	DAY	USA	NSH	SLM	KAN	WIN	KEN; 38	TOL	IOW	POC	MCH	BLN	KEN; 4	POC	NSH	ISF	MIL	GTW	DSF	CHI; 36	SLM	TAL	TOL	85th	300	
2009	Venturini Motorsports	15	Chevy	DAY	SLM	CAR; 9	TAL	KEN; 10	TOL	POC	MCH	MFD	IOW	KEN	BLN	POC	ISF	CHI	TOL	DSF	NJE	SLM	KAN	CAR			71st	380	
