= Frank Wilson Jr. =

American racing driver

- Born: June 29, 1966 (age 60); St. Marys, West Virginia, U.S.

ARCA Menards Series career
- 4 races run over 2 years
- Best finish: 53rd (2010)
- First race: 2010 Lucas Oil Slick Mist 200 (Daytona)
- Last race: 2011 Federated Car Care 200 (Toledo)
Wins	Top tens	Poles
0	0	0
- Statistics up to date as of January 14, 2025.

Frank Wilson Jr. (born June 29, 1966) is an American former professional stock car racing driver who competed in the ARCA Racing Series from 2009 to 2010. He previously attempted races in the NASCAR Craftsman Truck Series in 2005.

Wilson Jr. has also competed in the ARCA Truck Series and the Northern Xtreme DirtCar Series.

== Motorsports results ==
=== NASCAR ===
(key) (Bold - Pole position awarded by qualifying time. Italics - Pole position earned by points standings or practice time. * – Most laps led.)

==== Craftsman Truck Series ====
NASCAR Craftsman Truck Series results
Year	Team	No.	Make	1	2	3	4	5	6	7	8	9	10	11	12	13	14	15	16	17	18	19	20	21	22	23	24	25	NCTC	Pts	Ref
2005	Brevak Racing	31	Chevy	DAY	CAL	ATL	MAR	GTY	MFD; DNQ	CLT	DOV	TEX	MCH	MLW	KAN	KEN													N/A	0	
2005	Frank Wilson Sr.	27	Chevy														MEM; DNQ	IRP; DNQ	NSH	BRI; DNQ	RCH	NHA; DNQ	LVS	MAR; DNQ	ATL	TEX	PHO; DNQ	HOM	N/A	0	

=== ARCA Racing Series ===
(key) (Bold – Pole position awarded by qualifying time. Italics – Pole position earned by points standings or practice time. * – Most laps led.)

ARCA Racing Series results
Year	Team	No.	Make	1	2	3	4	5	6	7	8	9	10	11	12	13	14	15	16	17	18	19	20	ARSC	Pts	Ref
2010	Hixson Motorsports	23	Chevy	DAY; 18	PBE	SLM	TEX; 16	TAL	TOL	POC	MCH; 22	IOW	MFD	POC	BLN	NJE								53rd	435	
2010	Hixson Motorsports	13	Chevy														ISF; 32	CHI	DSF	TOL	SLM	KAN	CAR	53rd	435	
2011	Fast Track Racing	11	Chevy	DAY	TAL	SLM	TOL	NJE	CHI	POC	MCH	WIN	BLN	IOW	IRP	POC	ISF	MAD	DSF	SLM	KAN	TOL; 35		160th	55	
