= William East =

William East may refer to:

- William East (1695–1737), British politician
- Sir William East, 1st Baronet of Hall Place, Maidenhead (1738–1819), of the East baronets
- William East (rower) (1866–1933), English sculling champion
- William East (cricketer) (1872–1926), English cricketer
- William Gordon East (1902–1998), English geographer and writer
- William G. East (1908–1985), American jurist

== See also ==
- East (surname)
