= Todd Kluever =

American racing driver

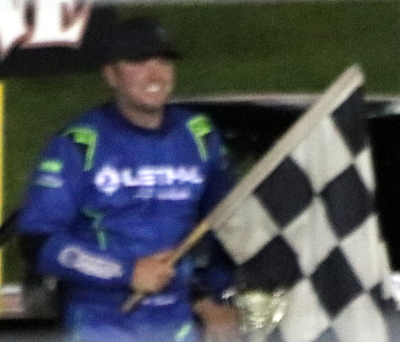
- Kluever in 2019 after winning a Midwest Truck Series event
- Born: July 6, 1978 (age 48); Sun Prairie, Wisconsin, U.S.
- Awards: 2005 NASCAR Craftsman Truck Series Rookie of the Year

NASCAR Cup Series career
- 4 races run over 1 year
- Best finish: 56th (2006)
- First race: 2006 USG Sheetrock 400 (Chicago)
- Last race: 2006 Bank of America 500 (Charlotte)
Wins	Top tens	Poles
0	0	0

NASCAR O'Reilly Auto Parts Series career
- 51 races run over 2 years
- Best finish: 17th (2006)
- First race: 2006 Hershey's Kissables 300 (Daytona)
- Last race: 2007 Zippo 200 at the Glen (Watkins Glen)
Wins	Top tens	Poles
0	5	1

NASCAR FedEx Freight Truck Series career
- 26 races run over 2 years
- Best finish: 11th (2005)
- First race: 2005 Florida Dodge Dealers 250 (Daytona)
- Last race: 2009 Copart 200 (Gateway)
Wins	Top tens	Poles
0	12	0
- Statistics up to date as of June 20, 2012.

Todd Alan Kluever (/ˈkliːvər/ KLEE-vər; born July 6, 1978) is an American former stock car racing driver. He raced in all of the top three NASCAR series in the 2000s.

== Early career ==
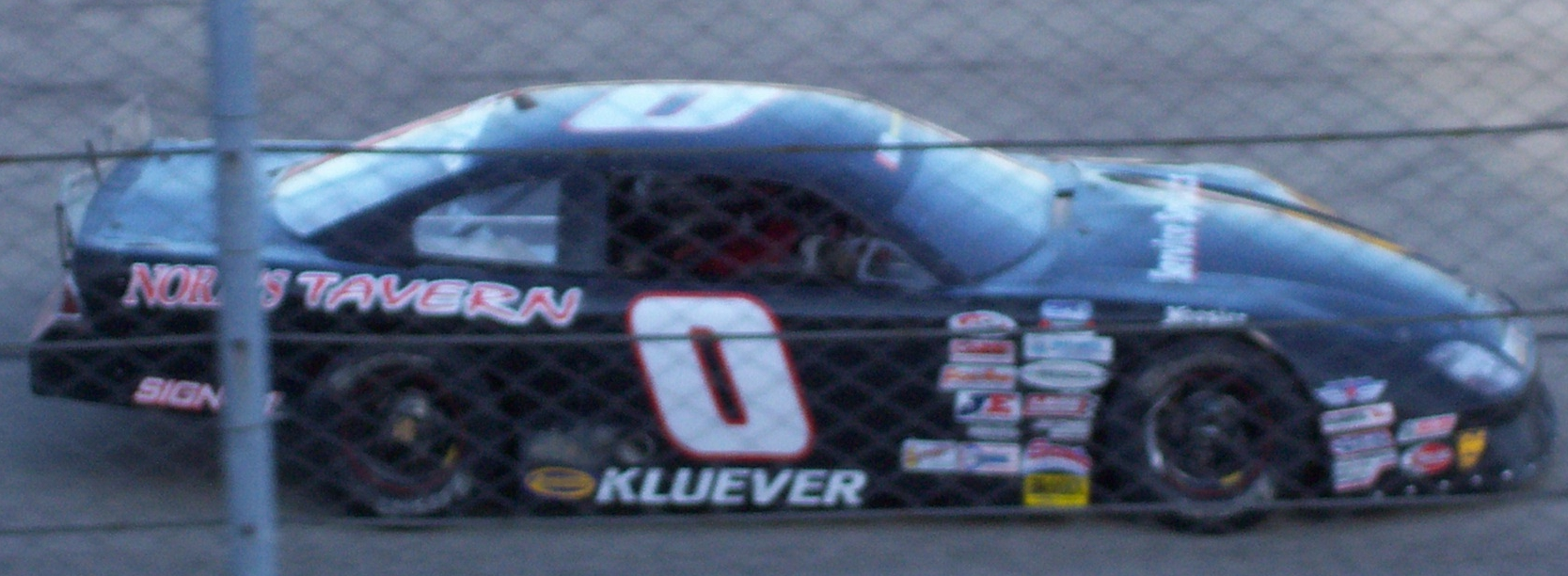
Kluever in 2008 ASA Midwest Tour race at Milwaukee

Kluever began his career by racing motorcycles for over nine years before he moved into full-bodied stock cars at a local track. He raced stock cars in the summer and snowmobiles during the Wisconsin winters. Kluever was the 2000 Rookie of the Year at Dells Motor Speedway in Wisconsin. In 2001, he won the Madison International Speedway Late Model Track Champion, and the Midwest All Racing Series (MARS) Championship and Rookie of the Year. He began racing in the American Speed Association in 2002, and finished tenth in the final points standings. He finished seventh in the 2003 final points standings. In 2004, he had four top-ten finishes in thirteen races, but the series' existence ended during the season. In October 2004, he was given the opportunity to participate in the Race for the Ride at North Wilkesboro Speedway. He beat out 25 drivers to make the final round at Darlington Speedway. He beat out nine other drivers to win the seat in a Roush truck.

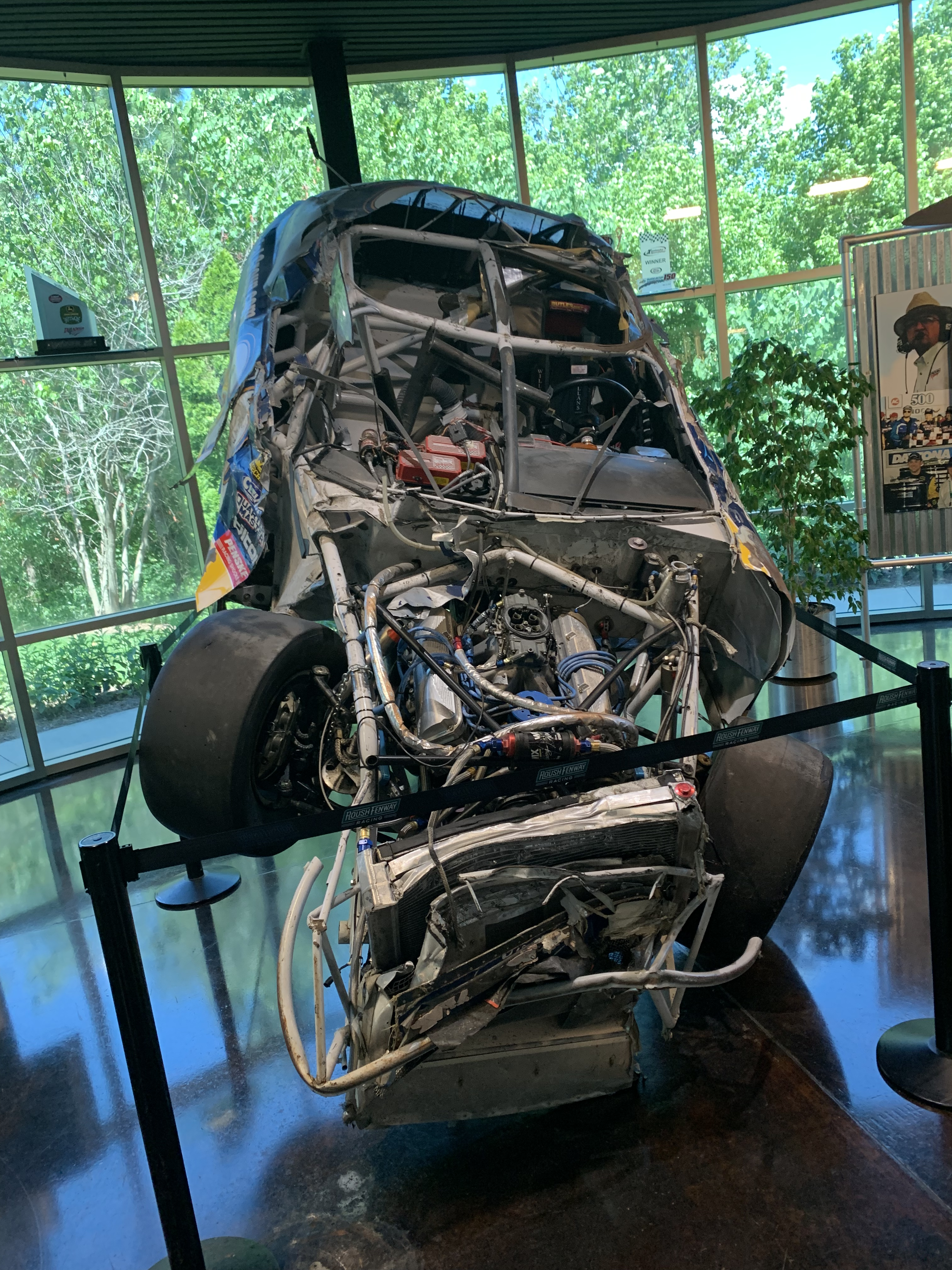
Kluever's wrecked ARCA car from 2005 on display at RFK Racing.

== NASCAR career ==
=== Nextel Cup Series ===
In 2006, Kluever was slated to race in six NASCAR Nextel Cup events in the No. 06 car during the season in preparation for a full season in 2007, beginning with the 2006 USG Sheetrock 400. However, Kluever struggled mightily in the car in four races, scoring a best finish of 32nd at Kansas Speedway with an average finish of 38.8 while DNFing in two of those races along with three DNQs. David Ragan, who Kluever shared the ride with, instead replaced the departing Mark Martin in the No. 6 AAA-sponsored Ford full-time in Nextel Cup in 2007.

=== Busch Series ===
For the 2006 season, Kluever moved to the Busch Series to drive the Roush Racing No. 06 3M Ford. In 2006, he had four top tens, an average finish of 23rd, seven DNFs, and finished seventeenth in points. In 2007, he drove sixteen races in the Busch Series for Roush Racing, in the No. 16 3M Ford Fusion with Greg Biffle and the No. 26 Dish Network Ford Fusion with Jamie McMurray. Kluever only scored one top-ten and had an average finish of 19.6. He did not race in NASCAR during the 2008 season. For 2009, Kluever drove the Team 42 Racing car at Memphis Motorsports Park, but failed to qualify.

=== Craftsman Truck Series ===
In 2005, he drove the No. 50 World Financial Group / Shell Rotella T Ford for Roush Fenway Racing in the Craftsman Truck Series. His twelve top-ten finishes and six top five finishes with an average finish of 14.5 earned him eleventh place in the final points standings and the Rookie of the Year award. In 2009, he ran the Camping World Truck Series race at Gateway in the No. 8 for MRD Motorsports. He finished twelfth.

== Racing after NASCAR ==
Kluever went back into racing at local and regional races. He raced in a variety of vehicles such as a IMCA Modified dirt car and in a Midwest Truck Series asphalt truck. In 2021, he raced in the Badger Midget series.

== Motorsports career results ==
=== NASCAR ===
(key) (Bold – Pole position awarded by qualifying time. Italics – Pole position earned by points standings or practice time. * – Most laps led.)

==== Nextel Cup Series ====
NASCAR Nextel Cup Series results
Year	Team	No.	Make	1	2	3	4	5	6	7	8	9	10	11	12	13	14	15	16	17	18	19	20	21	22	23	24	25	26	27	28	29	30	31	32	33	34	35	36	NNCC	Pts	Ref
2006	Roush Racing	06	Ford	DAY	CAL	LVS	ATL	BRI	MAR	TEX	PHO	TAL	RCH	DAR	CLT	DOV	POC	MCH	SON	DAY	CHI; 41	NHA	POC	IND	GLN	MCH; 43	BRI	CAL; DNQ	RCH	NHA	DOV	KAN; 32	TAL	CLT; 39	MAR	ATL	TEX	PHO; DNQ	HOM; DNQ	56th	187	

==== Nationwide Series ====
NASCAR Nationwide Series results
Year	Driver	No.	Make	1	2	3	4	5	6	7	8	9	10	11	12	13	14	15	16	17	18	19	20	21	22	23	24	25	26	27	28	29	30	31	32	33	34	35	NNSC	Pts	Ref
2006	Roush Racing	06	Ford	DAY; 7	CAL; 12	MXC; 32	LVS; 21	ATL; 18	BRI; 34	TEX; 21	NSH; 32	PHO; 42	TAL; 27	RCH; 22	DAR; 32	CLT; 9	DOV; 18	**NSH**; 17	KEN; 17	MLW; 23	DAY; 25	CHI; 18	NHA; 13	MAR; 30	GTY; 13	IRP; 24	GLN; 38	MCH; 37	BRI; 39	CAL; 27	RCH; 36	DOV; 13	KAN; 37	CLT; 18	MEM; 16	TEX; 10	PHO; 18	HOM; 9	17th	3304	
2007	Roush Racing	16	Ford	DAY; 14	CAL	MXC; 11	LVS	ATL; 33	BRI; 12	NSH; 13	TEX	PHO; 33	TAL	RCH	DAR; 38			NSH; 8	KEN; 23	MLW; 18	NHA; 17	DAY		GTY; 11	IRP	CGV; 21	GLN; 20	MCH	BRI	CAL	RCH	DOV	KAN	CLT	MEM	TEX	PHO	HOM	36th	1687	
2007	Roush Racing	26	Ford													CLT; 15	DOV						CHI; 26																36th	1687	
2009	Smith-Ganassi Racing	42	Dodge	DAY	CAL	LVS	BRI	TEX	NSH	PHO	TAL	RCH	DAR	CLT	DOV	NSH	KEN	MLW	NHA	DAY	CHI	GTY	IRP	IOW	GLN	MCH	BRI	CGV	ATL	RCH	DOV	KAN	CAL	CLT	MEM; DNQ	TEX	PHO	HOM	-	0	

==== Camping World Truck Series ====
NASCAR Camping World Truck Series results
Year	Team	No.	Make	1	2	3	4	5	6	7	8	9	10	11	12	13	14	15	16	17	18	19	20	21	22	23	24	25	NCWTC	Pts	Ref
2005	Roush Racing	50	Ford	DAY; 32	CAL; 4	ATL; 36	MAR; 16	GTY; 32	MFD; 4	CLT; 20	DOV; 20	TEX; 25	MCH; 15	MLW; 9	KAN; 2	KEN; 12	MEM; 10	IRP; 2	NSH; 5	BRI; 13	RCH; 32	NHA; 28	LVS; 8	MAR; 2	ATL; 6	TEX; 10	PHO; 12	HOM; 7	11th	3074	
2009	MRD Motorsports	8	Chevy	DAY	CAL	ATL	MAR	KAN	CLT	DOV	TEX	MCH	MLW	MEM	KEN	IRP	NSH	BRI	CHI	IOW	GTW; 12	NHA	LVS	MAR	TAL	TEX	PHO	HOM	80th	27	

=== ARCA Re/Max Series ===
(key) (Bold – Pole position awarded by qualifying time. Italics – Pole position earned by points standings or practice time. * – Most laps led.)

ARCA Re/Max Series results
Year	Team	No.	Make	1	2	3	4	5	6	7	8	9	10	11	12	13	14	15	16	17	18	19	20	21	22	23	ARSC	Pts	Ref
2005	Roush Racing	60	Ford	DAY; 11	NSH	SLM	KEN	TOL	LAN	MIL	POC	MCH	KAN	KEN	BLN	POC	GTW	LER	NSH	MCH	ISF	TOL	DSF	CHI	SLM	TAL	111th	180	
