= Jeff Milburn =

NASCAR team owner

Jeff Milburn (born in Washington, D.C.) is an American stunt driver and car designer. He has appeared as a stuntman on Prison Break and developed vehicles for Dusk. He is also the owner of Jeff Milburn Racing, a racing team that competes part-time in the NASCAR Craftsman Truck Series.
