= Bobby East =

American racing driver (1984–2022)

- Born: Robert John East; December 17, 1984; Torrance, California, U.S.
- Died: July 13, 2022 (aged 37); Westminster, California, U.S.
- Cause of death: Murder by stabbing
- Achievements: 2012 USAC Silver Crown Series Champion, 2013 USAC Silver Crown Series Champion; 2004 USAC National Midget Series Champion; 2008 Copper World Classic Winner; 2004 Belleville Midget Nationals Winner
- Awards: 2004 USAC Driver of the Year

NASCAR O'Reilly Auto Parts Series career
- 11 races run over 2 years
- Best finish: 52nd (2007)
- First race: 2005 Sam's Town 250 (Memphis)
- Last race: 2007 Ford 300 (Homestead)
Wins	Top tens	Poles
0	0	0

NASCAR FedEx Freight Truck Series career
- 31 races run over 3 years
- Best finish: 23rd (2006)
- First race: 2005 Chevy Silverado 150 (Phoenix)
- Last race: 2008 Qwik Liner Las Vegas 350 (Las Vegas)
Wins	Top tens	Poles
0	2	1
- Statistics up to date as of June 8, 2020.

Robert John East (December 17, 1984 – July 13, 2022) was an American professional stock car racing driver. He raced in USAC, ARCA, and NASCAR. During his career in the latter two, East was a member of Ford's driver development program.

== Racing career ==
In 2001, East became the youngest driver at sixteen years old to win a feature USAC National Midget event at the Illiana Motor Speedway in Schererville, Indiana.

East competed full-time in the USAC National Midget Series where he was the champion in 2004 driving the Steve Lewis Racing No. 9. The car's chassis was built by his father, Bob East, who is a renowned short-track car builder of midgets, sprints, and silver crown machines. The title gave him the distinction of being the youngest national champion in the series' history at the age of nineteen.

East was the most victorious driver during the 2004 USAC season with 15 victories among the series' three divisions. He wound up in victory lane seven times in national midgets, five times in national sprint cars, and once each in the Silver Crown, Western States Sprint Car, and Speedrome Regional Midget Series during the season. The highlights of the season were winning the Hut Hundred and the Turkey Night Grand Prix. During this prestigious time he attained the nickname 'Beast' among his loyal fans, which is an amalgamation of the first letter of his first-name 'B' combined alongside his last-name 'East', which is unlike his kind demeanor and character to those that know him, but better describes his victorious 2004 season on Team Lewis placing 1st overall in his No. 9 car.

East then moved on to racing stock cars. He first attempted to qualify for three races in the NASCAR Craftsman Truck Series in Roush Racing's No. 33 Ford, but failed to qualify for two of those races. In the one where he did qualify (at Phoenix), he wrecked late in that event and finished 30th. Additionally, he drove the No. 21 for Wood Brothers/JTG Racing at the Homstead season-finale, but failed to qualify for that race, too. Also that year, East made his ARCA Re/Max Series debut, where he competed at Talladega in October 2005, driving the No. 29 Ford for K Automotive Racing. A few weeks later, he made his NASCAR Busch Series debut at Memphis in the No. 46 for ST Motorsports and had a solid race, finishing 17th.

In 2006, East competed nearly full-time in the same truck, where he was teammates in the team's driver development program with fellow rookie Marcos Ambrose, who drove the team's No. 20 truck. East would finish the year 23rd in points despite missing the first two races of the season.

In 2007, East ran part-time in the Busch Series with Brewco Motorsports, splitting time in the team's No. 27, No. 37 and No. 43 cars. During the season, Brewco became Baker Curb Racing after a change in ownership.

East returned to the Truck Series part-time in 2008, reuniting with Roush to driving their No. 09 Zaxby's Ford F-150. This included him winning the pole for the race at IRP. Roush also tasked East with qualifying Cup Series Carl Edwards' Nationwide (formerly Busch) Series No. 60 car for the race at Memphis, the same track he made his debut at three years earlier. However, East was not able to qualify very high in the field, placing 34th, although Edwards would go on to win the race after making his way through the field to the front, taking the lead on lap 69 and staying there for the rest of the race. This effort would end up being East's last outing in NASCAR.

== Personal life ==
East was born in Torrance, California, and had also been living in Brownsburg, Indiana. Following the conclusion of his motorsports career, East experienced depression, used alcohol, and was diagnosed with schizophrenia by medical professionals. His parents believed these were caused or exacerbated by chronic traumatic encephalopathy from repeated head trauma suffered in racing accidents. As East was a homicide victim, an autopsy could not be performed to confirm whether the disease was present in his brain within the required timeframe after death.

== Death ==
On July 13, 2022, while filling his car with gas at a 76 gas station in Westminster, California, East was accosted by Trent Millsap, a transient who had a warrant for a parole violation out on him. The two exchanged words and Millsap stabbed East in his chest; East was rushed to the hospital, but died from his injuries shortly thereafter. Millsap was later found hiding in an apartment in nearby Anaheim and was killed in a shootout with Orange County police.

== Motorsports career results ==
=== NASCAR ===
(key) (Bold – Pole position awarded by qualifying time. Italics – Pole position earned by points standings or practice time. * – Most laps led.)

==== Nationwide Series ====
NASCAR Nationwide Series results
Year	Team	No.	Make	1	2	3	4	5	6	7	8	9	10	11	12	13	14	15	16	17	18	19	20	21	22	23	24	25	26	27	28	29	30	31	32	33	34	35	NNSC	Pts	Ref
2005	ST Motorsports	46	Ford	DAY	CAL	MXC	LVS	ATL	NSH	BRI	TEX	PHO	TAL	DAR	RCH	CLT	DOV	NSH	KEN	MLW	DAY	CHI	NHA	PPR	GTY	IRP	GLN	MCH	BRI	CAL	RCH	DOV	KAN	CLT	MEM; 17	TEX	PHO	HOM	106th	112	
2007	Brewco Motorsports	37	Ford	DAY	CAL	MXC	LVS	ATL	BRI	NSH	TEX	PHO	TAL	RCH	DAR	CLT	DOV	NSH; 24	KEN	MLW; 22	NHA	DAY	CHI	GTY; 16	IRP; 39	CGV	GLN	MCH; 38	BRI										52nd	806	
2007	Baker Curb Racing	37	Ford																											CAL; 24			KAN; 22	CLT					52nd	806	
2007	Baker Curb Racing	27	Ford																												RCH; 25	DOV						HOM; 12	52nd	806	
2007	Baker Curb Racing	43	Ford																																MEM; 36	TEX	PHO		52nd	806	
2008	Roush Fenway Racing	60	Ford	DAY	CAL	LVS	ATL	BRI	NSH	TEX	PHO	MXC	TAL	RCH	DAR	CLT	DOV	NSH	KEN	MLW	NHA	DAY	CHI	GTY	IRP	CGV	GLN	MCH	BRI	CAL	RCH	DOV	KAN	CLT	MEM; QL^{†}	TEX	PHO	HOM	N/A	0	
^{†} – Qualified for Carl Edwards

==== Craftsman Truck Series ====
NASCAR Craftsman Truck Series results
Year	Team	No.	Make	1	2	3	4	5	6	7	8	9	10	11	12	13	14	15	16	17	18	19	20	21	22	23	24	25	NCTC	Pts	Ref
2005	Roush Racing	33	Ford	DAY	CAL	ATL	MAR	GTY	MFD	CLT	DOV	TEX	MCH	MLW	KAN	KEN	MEM	IRP; DNQ	NSH	BRI	RCH; DNQ	NHA	LVS	MAR	ATL	TEX	PHO; 30		83rd	73	
2005	Wood Brothers/JTG Racing	21	Ford																									HOM; DNQ	83rd	73	
2006	Wood Brothers/JTG Racing	20	Ford	DAY	CAL	ATL; 23																							23rd	2186	
2006	Wood Brothers/JTG Racing	21	Ford				MAR; 13	GTY; 13	CLT; 24	MFD; 34	DOV; 17	TEX; 28	MCH; 30	MLW; 17	KAN; 24	KEN; 34	MEM; 21	IRP; 11	NSH; 36	BRI; 29	NHA; 30	LVS; 22	TAL; 23	MAR; 21	ATL; 15	TEX; 22	PHO; 18	HOM; 16	23rd	2186	
2008	Roush Fenway Racing	09	Ford	DAY	CAL	ATL	MAR	KAN; 24	CLT	MFD	DOV	TEX; 8	MCH; 18	MLW	MEM; 8	KEN	**IRP**; 19	NSH	BRI	GTW; 25	NHA	LVS; 25	TAL	MAR	ATL	TEX	PHO	HOM	34th	771	

=== ARCA Re/Max Series ===
(key) (Bold – Pole position awarded by qualifying time. Italics – Pole position earned by points standings or practice time. * – Most laps led.)

ARCA Re/Max Series results
Year	Team	No.	Make	1	2	3	4	5	6	7	8	9	10	11	12	13	14	15	16	17	18	19	20	21	22	23	ARSC	Pts	Ref
2005	K Automotive Racing	29	Ford	DAY	NSH	SLM	KEN	TOL	LAN	MIL	POC	MCH	KAN	KEN	BLN	POC	GTW	LER	NSH	MCH	ISF	TOL	DSF	CHI	SLM	TAL; 36	169th	50	
