= David East (artist) =

David East is a visual artist and the Chair of Ceramics at the Maryland Institute College of Art. He has received an Individual Artist Award from the Maryland State Arts Council, a Lighton International Artists Exchange Program Grant, and was an artist-in-residence at the European Ceramic Work Centre in The Netherlands. His work is in many collections including the Faenza International Ceramic Museum in Faenza, Italy.
