= 2009 ASA Midwest Tour season =

2009 ASA Midwest Tour

Seasons
- ← 2008 2010 →

The 2009 ASA Kwik-Trip Midwest Tour presented by Echo Outdoor Power Equipment was the third season of the American Speed Association's Midwest Tour. The championship was held over 12 races, beginning May 3 in Oregon, Wisconsin, and ending October 11 in West Salem, Wisconsin. Steve Carlson was the champion.

== Schedule and results ==
| Rnd | Date | Race Name | Track | Location | Fast Qualifier | Winner |
|---|---|---|---|---|---|---|
| 1 | May 3 | Joe Shear Classic 136 presented by ECHO Chain Saws | Madison International Speedway | Oregon, Wisconsin | Jeremy Lepak | Nathan Haseleu |
| 2 | May 16 | Pride Of Iowa 100 | Iowa Speedway | Newton, Iowa | Tim Schendel | Chris Wimmer |
| 3 | May 23 | Elko 125 | Elko Speedway | Elko, Minnesota | Steve Carlson | Steve Carlson |
| 4 | May 30 | "Race For The Gold" Bronze 125 | Dells Raceway Park | Wisconsin Dells, Wisconsin | Dan Fredrickson | Steve Carlson |
| 5 | June 20 | Elmer Musgrave Memorial 100 | Illiana Motor Speedway | Schererville, Indiana | Nathan Haseleu | Jacob Goede |
| 6 | July 3 | Keith Fleck/Miller 100 | Hawkeye Downs Speedway | Cedar Rapids, Iowa | Nathan Haseleu | Steve Carlson |
| 7 | July 18 | "Race For The Gold" Silver 125 | Dells Raceway Park | Wisconsin Dells, Wisconsin | Jeff Kendall | Frank Kreyer |
| 8 | August 4 | Dixieland 150 | Wisconsin International Raceway | Kaukauna, Wisconsin | Nathan Haseleu | Steve Carlson |
| 9 | August 16 | Shakopee 100 | Raceway Park | Shakopee, Minnesota | Ryan Johnson | Donny Reuvers |
| 10 | September 6 | Labor Day 100 | Norway Speedway | Norway, Michigan | Steve Carlson | Jamie Iverson |
| 11 | September 26 | "Race For The Gold" Elko 125 | Elko Speedway | Elko, Minnesota | Jacob Goede | Dan Fredrickson |
| 12 | October 11 | Oktoberfest 100 | La Crosse Fairgrounds Speedway | West Salem, Wisconsin | Steve Carlson | Travis Sauter |

== Championship points ==
| Pos | Driver | Points |
|---|---|---|
| 1 | Steve Carlson | 1468 |
| 2 | Nathan Haseleu | 1449 |
| 3 | Chris Wimmer | 1403 |
| 4 | Tim Schendel | 1239 |
| 5 | Jonathan Eilen | 1215 |
| 6 | Dan Fredrickson | 1143 |
| 7 | Jeff Storm | 1095 |
| 8 | Jacob Goede (R) | 1092 |
| 9 | Nick Neville (R) | 1087 |
| 10 | Mark Kraus | 1084 |
| 11 | Blake Brown (R) | 1043 |
| 12 | Nick Murgic | 1040 |
| 13 | Jamie Iverson | 1035 |
| 14 | Andrew Morrissey | 990 |
| 15 | Nick Panitzke (R) | 979 |
| 16 | Kyle Calmes | 918 |
| 17 | Donny Reuvers | 591 |
| 18 | Steve Holzhausen | 552 |
| 19 | Matt Kocourek | 542 |
| 20 | Dalton Zehr (R) | 534 |
| 21 | Bryan Reffner | 491 |
| 22 | Frank Kreyer | 483 |
| 23 | Travis Sauter | 441 |
| 24 | Mark Eswein | 401 |
| 25 | Gregg Haese (R) | 386 |
| 26 | Blake Hortsman | 354 |
| 27 | Brent Kirchner | 349 |
| 28 | Kris Kelly | 329 |
| 29 | Dan Lensing | 302 |
| 30 | Adam Royle | 290 |
| 31 | Russ Blakeley | 285 |
| 32 | Joey Johnson (R) | 273 |
| 33 | Eugene Gregorich Jr. | 267 |
| 34 | Gary LaMonte (R) | 256 |
| 35 | Jake Ryan | 242 |
| 36 | Josh Vadnais | 238 |
| 37 | Todd Hansen | 236 |
| 38 | Jeremy Lepak | 235 |
| 39 | Michael Bilderback | 231 |
| 40 | Joel Theisen (R) | 223 |
| 41 | Jeff Kendall | 222 |
| 42 | Don Turner | 213 |
| 43 | Kenny Reiser | 210 |
| 44 | Mark Lamoreux | 201 |
| 45 | Paul Paine | 191 |
| 46 | Thor Anderson | 177 |
| 47 | Bryan Roach | 175 |
| 48 | Griffin McGrath | 171 |
| 49 | Gregg Van Grool | 164 |
| 50 | Tom Gee Jr. | 163 |
| 51 | Ricky Baker | 153 |
| 52 | Mike Gunderson | 151 |
| 53 | Joey Gase | 150 |
| 54 | Dave Gentile | 147 |
| 55 | Anthony Danta | 142 |
| 56 | Larry Schuler | 136 |
| 57 | Andy Monday | 134 |
| 58 | Ron Hornaday Jr. | 132 |
| 59 | Curt Tillman | 131 |
| 60 | Jason Schneider | 130 |
| 61 | Jon Olson | 128 |
| 62 | Kelly Bires | 124 |
| 63 | Tom Lindquist | 120 |
| 64 | Jamie Farrell | 118 |
| 65 | Boris Jurkovic | 117 |
| 66 | Landon Cassill | 110 |
| 67 | Jack Kalwasinski | 110 |
| 68 | Doug Mahlik | 109 |
| 69 | Brad Osborn | 108 |
| 70 | Chris Weinkauf | 102 |
| 71 | Dave Feiler | 101 |
| 72 | Jim Ross | 101 |
| 73 | Ryan Johnson | 100 |
| 74 | Tim Sauter | 99 |
| 75 | Kevin Harvick | 98 |
| 76 | Joey Miller | 96 |
| 77 | Dean Corneilus | 94 |
| 78 | Mike Carlson | 92 |
| 79 | Dan Lindsey | 89 |
| 80 | Johnny Sauter | 88 |
| 81 | Chad Whalen | 88 |
| 82 | Bobby Wilberg | 84 |
| 83 | Robb Vanderloop | 84 |
| 84 | Joe Ross | 83 |
| 85 | Gene Coleman | 78 |
| 86 | Billy Mohn | 76 |
| 87 | Steve Rubeck | 74 |
| 88 | Trent Snyder | 72 |
| 89 | John Meidam | 72 |
| 90 | Johnny Spaw | 70 |
| 91 | John Ostermann | 70 |
| 92 | Skylar Holzhausen | 70 |
| 93 | Jenny White | 69 |
| 94 | Brett Piontek | 68 |
| 95 | Gordie Swanson | 68 |
| 96 | Ryan Hood | 68 |
| 97 | Shane Morrissey | 67 |
| 98 | Tony Brewer | 66 |
| 99 | Mitch Curran | 66 |
| 100 | Dudley Fleck | 65 |
| 101 | Krista Bumbera | 64 |
| 102 | Shawn Majkrzak | 62 |
| 103 | Jon Lemke | 60 |
| 104 | Brian Johnson Jr. | 60 |
| 105 | Austin Siebert | 56 |
| 106 | Scott Stanchina | 56 |
| 107 | Josh Krug | 47 |
| 108 | Dean Varda | 47 |
| 109 | Joe Berthiaume | 47 |
| 110 | Tim Cox | 47 |
| 111 | Jerick Johnson | 46 |
| 112 | Tyler Sjoman | 46 |
| 113 | Ronnie Rihn | 45 |
| 114 | Cameron Dodson (R) | 44 |
| 115 | Brad Dvorak | 44 |
| 116 | Dean LaPointe | 44 |
| 117 | Paul Neisus | 43 |
| 118 | Stevie Campbell | 43 |
| 119 | Conrad Jorgenson | 41 |
| 120 | Steve Anderson | 39 |
| 121 | Eric Fransen | 24 |
