= 2007 ASA Midwest Tour season =

2007 ASA Midwest Tour

Seasons
- ← none 2008 →

The 2007 ASA Kwik-Trip Midwest Tour presented by Echo Outdoor Power Equipment was the first season of the American Speed Association's Midwest Tour. The championship was held over 11 races, beginning April 28 in Elko, Minnesota, and ending October 7 in West Salem, Wisconsin. Nathan Haseleu was the champion.

== Schedule and results ==
Rnd	Date	Race Name	Track	Location	Fast Qualifier	Winner
1	April 28	Elko 125	Elko Speedway	Elko, Minnesota	Dan Fredrickson	Jonathan Eilen
2	May 20	Jefferson 100	Jefferson Speedway	Cambridge, Wisconsin	Dan Lensing	Nathan Haseleu
3	June 1	Keith Fleck/Miller 100	Hawkeye Downs Speedway	Cedar Rapids, Iowa	Steve Carlson	Steve Carlson
4	June 12	Back Home 100	Dells Raceway Park	Wisconsin Dells, Wisconsin	Travis Sauter	Kenny Richards
5	June 22	Norway 100	Norway Speedway	Norway, Michigan	Nathan Haseleu	Jamie Iverson
NC	July 3	Independence Day Kwik Trip 100	La Crosse Fairgrounds Speedway	West Salem, Wisconsin	Josh Vadnais	Dan Fredrickson
6	July 7	July Spectacular 100	I-94 Speedway	Sauk Centre, Minnesota	Jacob Goede	Jacob Goede
7	July 13	Appleton Memorial/Echo Power Blower 100	Grundy County Speedway	Morris, Illinois	Dan Fredrickson	Dan Fredrickson
8	July 20	Echo Chain Saw/Five Star Race Car Bodies No Bull 100	Madison International Speedway	Oregon, Wisconsin	Nathan Haseleu	Brandon Hill
9	August 7	Factory Motor Parts 150	Wisconsin International Raceway	Kaukauna, Wisconsin	Nathan Haseleu	Kyle Busch
10	August 12	Shakopee 100	Raceway Park	Shakopee, Minnesota	Donny Reuvers	Dan Fredrickson
11	October 7	Oktoberfest 100	La Crosse Fairgrounds Speedway	West Salem, Wisconsin	Steve Holzhausen	Dan Fredrickson

== Championship points ==
Pos	Driver	Points
1	Nathan Haseleu	1293
2	Donny Reuvers	1253
3	Dave Feiler	1194
4	Jamie Iverson	1137
5	Kenny Richards	1133
6	Jonathan Eilen (R)	1125
7	Dan Fredrickson	1095
8	Travis Sauter (R)	1090
9	Steve Carlson	1040
10	Brian Johnson Jr. (R)	1023
11	Brandon Hill (R)	907
12	Doug Mahlik (R)	825
13	Kris Kelly (R)	797
14	Rich Loch	795
15	Russ Blakely	780
16	Josh Vadnais	778
17	Kyle Calmes (R)	757
18	Mark Kraus	756
19	Bryan Roach	755
20	Jacob Goede (R)	561
21	Adam Royle	522
22	Dan Lensing (R)	442
23	Rod Wheeler	390
24	Steve Anderson	355
25	Johnny Sauter	345
26	Michael Pickens (R)	343
27	Rich Bickle	343
28	J. J. Mueller	330
29	Dean Cornelius (R)	314
30	Steve Holzhausen	293
31	AJ Rhoads	291
32	Kyle Busch	285
33	Jim Duchow	278
34	Jason Schneider (R)	273
35	Frank Kreyer	273
36	Dick Trickle	266
37	Andrew Morrissey	253
38	Trevor Stewart	242
39	Chris Grimes	225
40	Ron Hornaday Jr.	213
41	Jeremy Lepak	201
42	Nick Mahlik	199
43	Chad Walen	198
44	Tony Strupp	196
45	Jon Olson	192
46	Bobby Wilberg	187
47	Brian Hoppe	187
48	Rob Vanderloop	185
49	Nick Murgic	184
50	Don Turner	176
51	Collin Bamke	173
52	Tim Schendel	168
53	Jacob Humphrey	167
54	Benny VanCleve	161
55	Joe Berthiaume	152
56	Zac Davids	151
57	Molly Rhoads	148
58	Chris Wimmer	139
59	Jeff Kendall	137
60	Mike Gunderson	128
61	Kenny Reiser	126
62	Robert Maynor	126
63	Kevin Cywinski	126
64	Andy Hanson	126
65	Joey Johnson	124
66	Jeff Lofquist	123
67	Ken Schrader	122
68	John Nutley	116
69	Mike Heiss	111
70	Jeff Way	108
71	Steve Dobbratz	106
72	Mark Hartline	104
73	Eddie Hoffman	104
74	Andy Monday	102
75	Trent Snyder	102
76	Pat Kelly	100
77	Neil Knobloch	100
78	Thor Anderson	98
79	Todd Stapleman	96
80	Boris Jurkovic	96
81	Bob Menor	92
82	Mike Tetzlaff	89
83	Bruce White	88
84	Nick Panitzke	88
85	Jesse Saunders	86
86	Jake Ryan	84
87	Jeff VanOudenhoven	82
88	Brad Osborn	82
89	Travis Kvapil	82
90	Steve Rubeck	82
91	Darren Giles	80
92	Tom Lindquist	80
93	John Meidam	80
94	Bryan Turtle	80
95	Marshall Beck	80
96	Dylan Schuyler	78
97	Zach Riddle	78
98	John Baumerister	78
99	Kyle Kinder	78
100	Kevin Nuttleman	78
101	Lane Brenden	77
102	Kyle Hinrichs	76
103	Charlie Menard	74
104	Scott Wimmer	74
105	Jeff Green	74
106	Blake Horstman	74
107	Mike Gardner	72
108	Jamie Wallace	70
109	Fran Prestay	70
110	Eugene Gregorich Jr.	68
111	Joey Miller	67
112	Corey Flynn	65
113	John Wood	64
114	Jason Weinkauf	64
115	Tim Sauter	63
116	Scott Blake	62
117	Scott Stanchina	62
118	Tommy Knippenberg	62
119	Bill Rode	60
120	Jack Kalwasinski	60
121	Jason Erickson	59
122	Jim Carlson	59
123	Dudley Fleck	58
124	Ritch Johnson	58
125	Jason Vandenberg	58
126	Mark Eswein	58
127	Eric Fransen	57
128	Jeff Storm	56
129	Eddie May	53
130	Mike Richer	53
131	JR Norris	52
132	Matt Kocourek	51
133	Erik Darnell	50
134	Dalton Zehr	50
135	Darren Bucklen	50
136	Jerry Cowan	49
137	Brad Keith	48
138	Bob White	48
139	Jerry Kobza	48
140	Wade Lynn	46
141	Pete Moore	46
142	Billy Mohn	44
143	Dave Finney	42
144	Dean LaPointe	42
145	Tyler Sjoman	41
146	Tim Hintz	41
147	Griffen McGrath	40
148	Trevor Millikan	39
149	Dan Savage	37
150	Randy Coghlan	34
151	Brad Dvorak	34
152	Jerry Einhaus	34
153	Andy Niles	34
154	Eugene Dick	32
155	Gordy Swanson	32
156	Dave Weltmeyer	28
157	Michael Bilderback	26
158	Nick Schumacher	26
159	Chris Sevey	24
160	Gregg Ruffalo	24
161	Race McComb	24
162	Joel Theisen	24
163	Tim Rothe	22
164	Mike White	22
165	Bruce Yackey	20
