= 2008 ASA Midwest Tour season =

2008 ASA Midwest Tour

Seasons
- ← 2007 2009 →

The 2008 ASA Kwik-Trip Midwest Tour presented by Echo Outdoor Power Equipment was the second season of the American Speed Association's Midwest Tour. The championship was held over 14 races, beginning April 19 in Elko, Minnesota, and ending October 5 in West Salem, Wisconsin. Dan Fredrickson was the champion.

== Schedule and results ==
Rnd	Date	Race Name	Track	Location	Fast Qualifier	Winner
1	April 19	Kwik Trip 125	Elko Speedway	Elko, Minnesota	Dan Fredrickson	Jake Ryan
2	May 4	Echo Chain Saw 100	Madison International Speedway	Oregon, Wisconsin	Jacob Goede	Dan Fredrickson
3	May 17	KwikTrip Stores 100	Jefferson Speedway	Cambridge, Wisconsin	Blake Horstman	Jonathan Eilen
4	June 1	Miller Lite 100	Dells Raceway Park	Wisconsin Dells, Wisconsin	Dan Fredrickson	Donny Reuvers
5	June 22	Echo Power Blower 100	Grundy County Speedway	Morris, Illinois	Johnny Sauter	Donny Reuvers
6	July 5	Echo Bear Cat July Spectacular 100	I-94 Speedway	Sauk Centre, Minnesota	Chris Wimmer	Dan Fredrickson
7	July 18	36th Annual Keith Fleck Miller 100	Hawkeye Downs Speedway	Cedar Rapids, Iowa	Johnny Sauter	Steve Carlson
8	July 20	Rasmussen Group Twin 75's	Iowa Speedway	Newton, Iowa	Tim Schendel	Tim Schendel
9	August 5	SCAG Dixieland 150	Wisconsin International Raceway	Kaukauna, Wisconsin	Kyle Busch	Steve Carlson
10	August 17	Shakopee 100	Raceway Park	Shakopee, Minnesota	Travis Sauter	Donny Reuvers
11	August 24	Wisconsin All-Star 100	Milwaukee Mile	West Allis, Wisconsin	Kyle Busch	Kyle Busch
12	August 31	Labor Day 100	Norway Speedway	Norway, Michigan	Chris Wimmer	Jamie Iverson
13	September 7	Kim Parsons Memorial 100	Marshfield Super Speedway	Marshfield, Wisconsin	Donny Reuvers	Tim Schendel
14	October 5	Oktoberfest 100	La Crosse Fairgrounds Speedway	West Salem, Wisconsin	Steve Carlson	Dan Fredrickson

== Championship points ==
Pos	Driver	Points
1	Dan Fredrickson	1707
2	Donny Reuvers	1605
3	Tim Schendel	1488
4	Chris Wimmer	1463
5	Jamie Iverson	1417
6	Andrew Morrisey	1417
7	Travis Sauter	1413
8	Nathan Haseleu	1401
9	Jonathan Eilen	1396
10	Blake Horstman	1296
11	Kyle Calmes	1214
12	Nick Murgic (R)	1185
13	Jeff Storm	1145
14	Steve Carlson	1139
15	Russ Blakeley	1065
16	Bryan Roach	1007
17	Mark Kraus	954
18	Rich Loch	927
19	Kris Kelly	842
20	Brandon Hill	711
21	Matt Kocourek (R)	639
22	Frank Kreyer	618
23	Adam Hensel (R)	557
24	Paul Paine	548
25	Jacob Goede	525
26	Kyle Busch	427
27	Jake Ryan	421
28	Doug Mahlik	381
29	Gordy Swanson	379
30	Josh Vadnais	377
31	Johnny Sauter	349
32	Joey Johnson	348
33	Steve Holzhausen	347
34	Eugene Gregorich Jr	343
35	Nick Neville	314
36	Don Turner	278
37	Steve Anderson	247
38	Matt Kenseth	246
39	Mark Eswein	244
40	Derek Neville	238
41	Brett Moffitt	238
42	Tim Hintz	214
43	Dalton Zehr	186
44	Andy Monday	183
45	Kenny Reiser	181
46	Dave Feiler	178
47	Joel Thiesen (R)	173
48	Tim Rothe	171
49	Todd Hansen	162
50	Mark Lamoreaux	162
51	Adam Royle	160
52	Jamie Farrell	157
53	Joey Gase	150
54	Jon Olson	150
55	Joe Berthiaume	150
56	Thor Anderson	143
57	Robb Vanderloop	141
58	Chris Grimes	136
59	Todd Kluever	129
60	Jason Schneider	128
61	Brett Sontag	125
62	Billy Mohn (R)	123
63	Kenny Richards	115
64	Cameron Dodson	115
65	Josh Bauer	114
66	Jason Weinkauf	114
67	Eugene Dick	113
68	Tom Gee, Jr.	112
69	Michael Gunderson	111
70	Greg Haese	111
71	Dean Cornelius	106
72	Chris Skrede	106
73	Gary LaMonte (R)	101
74	Mike Reichenber	101
75	Jerick Johnson	98
76	Mike Richter	98
77	Clint Sillars	97
78	Darrin Giles	96
79	Steve Dobbratz	96
80	Jeff Kendall	96
81	Jim Ross	96
82	Tom Lindquist	95
83	John Meidam	94
84	Shane Morrisey	93
85	Jason Vandenberg	93
86	Tim Sauter	92
87	Joey Miller	92
88	Dean LaPointe	89
89	Nick Panitzke	88
90	Landon Cassill	88
91	Dillon Kralovetz	86
92	Jeremy Lepak	86
93	Chris Weinkauf	86
94	Mike Gardner	84
95	Bryan Turtle	84
96	Stevie Campbell	82
97	Boris Jurkovic	80
98	Matt Frazer	78
99	Griffin McGrath	77
100	Johnny Spaw	76
101	Jeff VanOudenhouven	76
102	Bob Danes	76
103	Mike Heiss	74
104	Tyler Sjoman	74
105	Brett Piontek	74
106	Rick Burns	72
107	Rich Snyder	72
108	Dylan Schuyler	70
109	Steve Schultz	68
110	Zach Riddle	68
111	Dudley Fleck	68
112	Molly Rhoads	68
113	Rich Bickle	66
114	Jill George	62
115	Tom Knippenburg	60
116	Ryan Lee Johnson	60
117	Dan Jung	60
118	Bruce White	59
119	Scott Stanchia	58
120	Dave Weltmeyer	57
121	Brad Dvorak	57
122	Doug Hahn	56
123	Brad Osborn	54
124	Kyle Kinder	53
125	Trent Snyder	52
126	Dagnan Scott	52
127	Terry Baldry	52
128	Kevin Cywinski	49
129	Jerry Sharp	47
130	Terry Patnode	46
131	Jim Larkin	45
132	Gordy Mason	43
133	Michael Hoeft	42
134	Jeff Lofquist	41
135	Jeff McDonald	38
136	Neil Knoblock	26
137	Greg Van Grool	24
138	Chris Sevey	22
139	Nick Hammer	20
