= Grool =

Grool may refer to:

== Fiction ==
- Grool (monster), see List of Goosebumps episodes
- Grool, planet on Bubble and Squeak (video game)

== Surname ==
- Josef Grool, character played by Peter Outerbridge
- Greg Van Grool, see 2008 ASA Midwest Tour season

== See also ==
- Gruel, a food
