= Elko Speedway =

Motorsport track in Elko New Market, Minnesota, U.S.

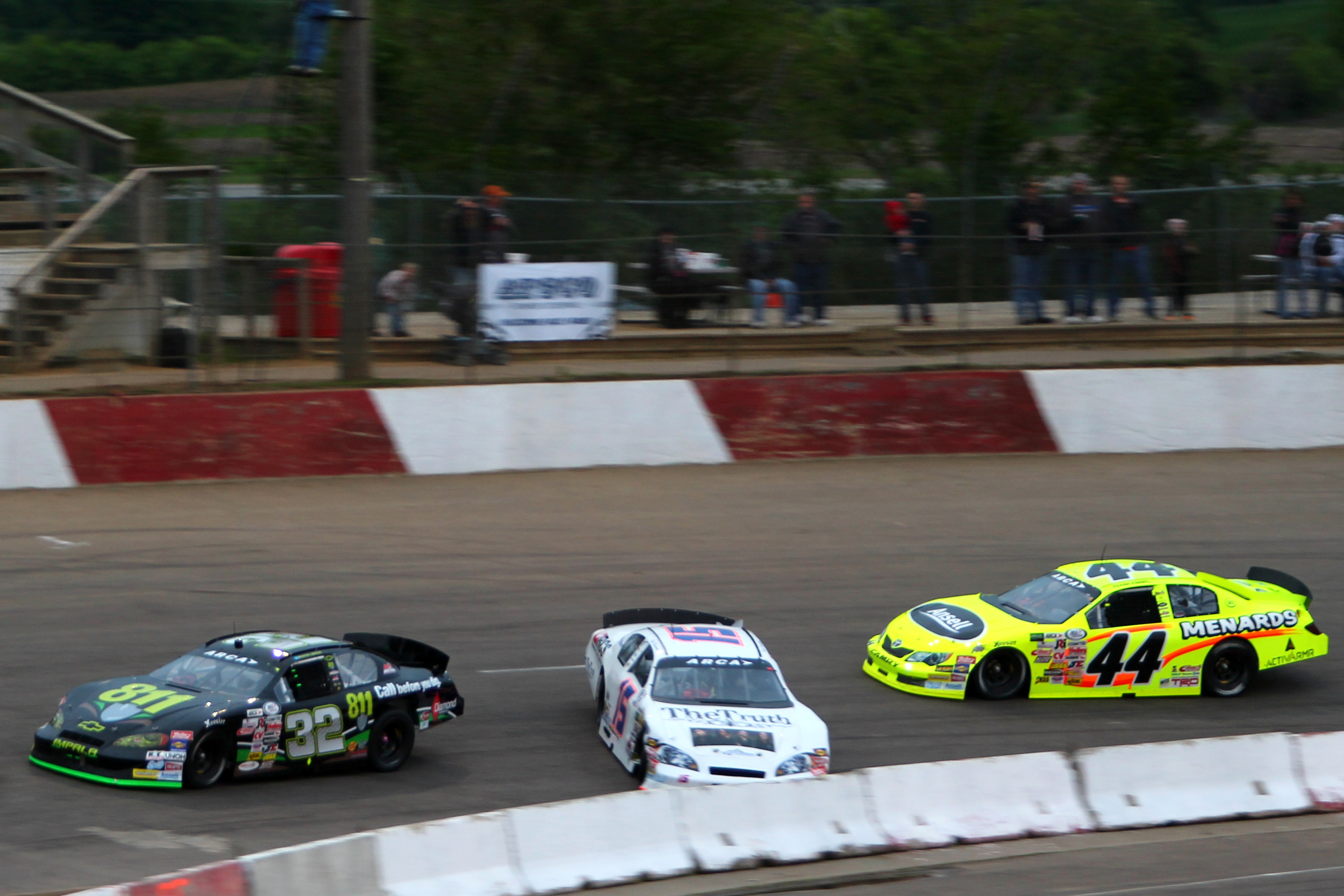
- 2013 ARCA race: Akona 250
- Location: Elko New Market, Minnesota
- Coordinates: 44°34′9.67″N 93°19′52.52″W
- Owner: MEGA properties
- Broke ground: 1964
- Opened: 1965
- Major events: Current: ARCA Menards Series; Shore Lunch 250 (2012–2014, 2017–2019, 2021–present); ASA Midwest Tour (2007–2017, 2024–present); Former: NASCAR K&N Pro Series West (2007); NASCAR K&N Pro Series East (2007); ASA National Tour (2002–2004); NASCAR Midwest Series (2001–2003)

Oval (1965–present)
- Surface: Asphalt
- Length: 0.375 mi (0.603 km)
- Turns: 4
- Race lap record: 0:14.754 ( (United States) Lavar Scott, Chevrolet Camaro SS, 2024, ARCA Menards)

Elko Speedway is a 3/8 mile asphalt oval NASCAR-sanctioned race track located in Elko New Market, Minnesota. Elko Speedway is a track in the NASCAR Advance Auto Parts Weekly Series. The track is located in the former Elko portion of the merged city.

== Divisions ==
The track divisions include Limited Late Models, Thunder Car, Legends, Power Stocks, and Bandoleros on regular Saturday Nights.

== Traveling series ==
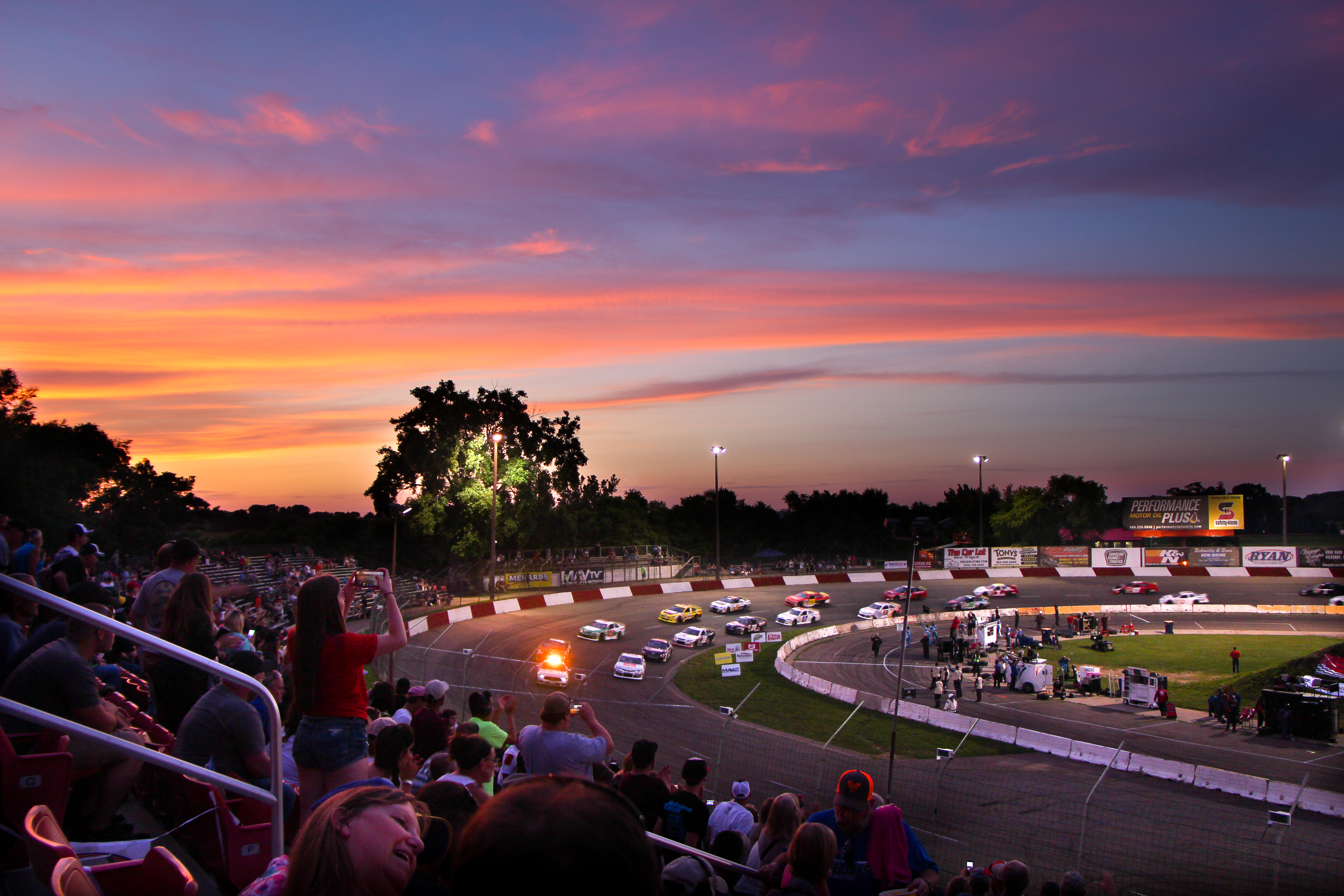
2019 ARCA race

The ASA held races at the track, and its successor the ARCA Midwest Tour still holds events. The track has held Mid-American Stock Car Series events as well as their now-defunct Super Truck division.

The ARCA Racing Series held the Akona 200, their first ever race in Minnesota, at Elko Speedway on June 2, 2012. The series returned in 2013 and 2014 for the Akona 250, adding 50 laps to the event. Elko is the shortest track ARCA currently races on.

== Eve of Destruction ==
Elko Speedway commonly hosts an event called "Eve of Destruction" which would have traditional racing, as well as events such as using a Jet Truck to melt a car, Burn Out competitions, School Bus Figure-8 Racing, and Trailer racing. all with the intent of showing cars being damaged or on fire.

== Drive in Movie Theater ==
Elko Speedway has a Drive-in theater in which films are shown, most commonly after races.

== See also ==
- 2007 Elko 125
- 2008 Kwik Trip 125
- 2009 Elko 125 (Spring)
- Demolition derby
