= ASA Midwest Tour =

Racing series

- Category: Stock car racing
- Country: United States
- Inaugural season: 2007
- Drivers' champion: Casey Johnson (4th title)
- Official website: starsnationaltour.com/midwest

The ASA Midwest Tour (known between 2012 and 2022 as the ARCA Midwest Tour) is a pavement Super Late Model auto racing series based in the Midwestern United States with its headquarters in Oregon, Wisconsin. It was a developmental series of the Automobile Racing Club of America (ARCA), and currently of the American Speed Association, along with the CRA Super Series.

== History ==
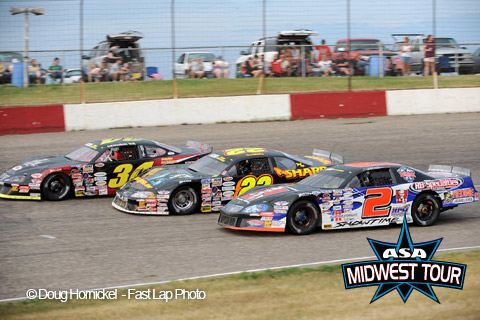
The Midwest Tour under ASA sanction

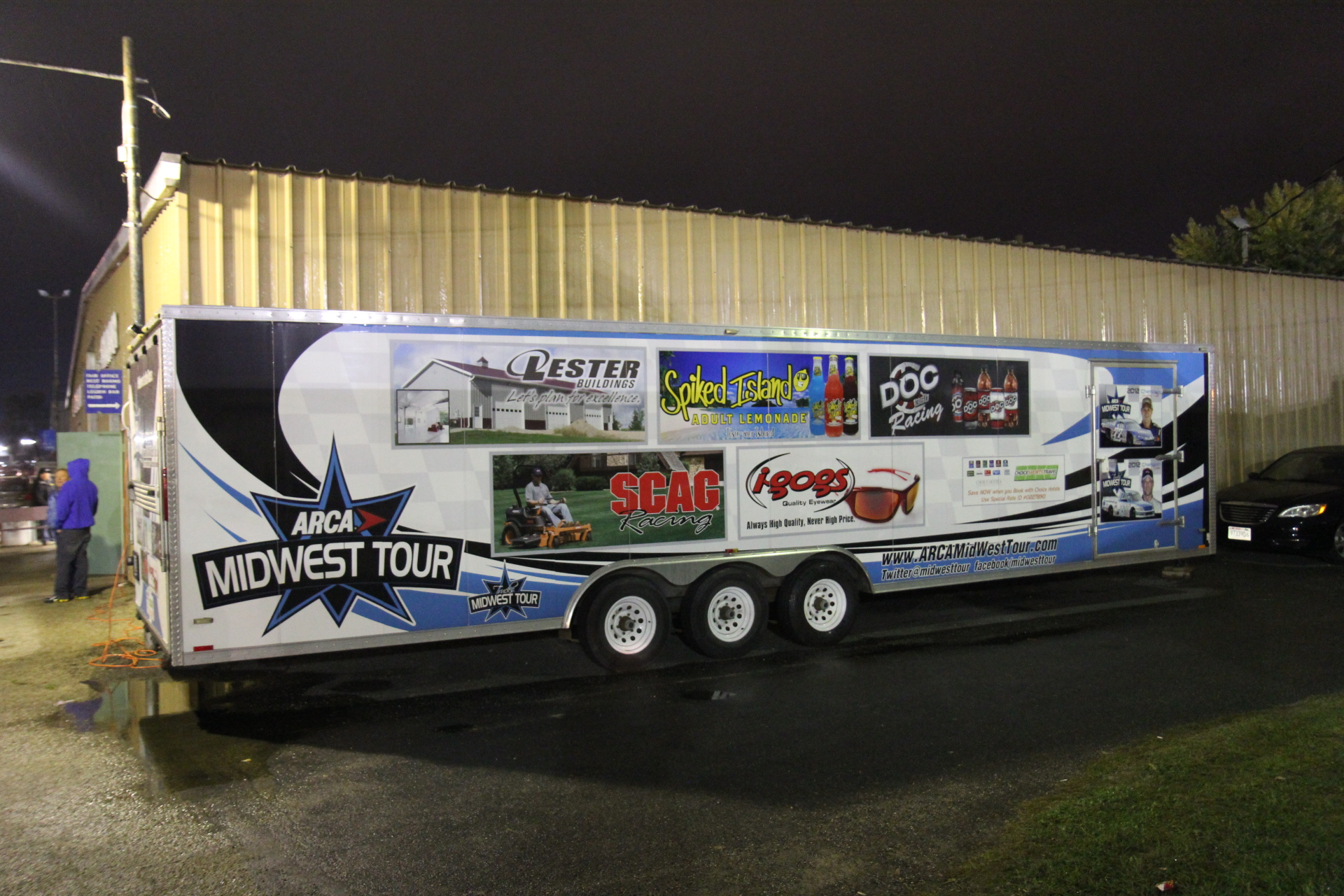
Trailer in 2013

The series can trace its roots back to the ARTGO series which was formed in 1975. NASCAR sanctioned the tour from 1998 until 2006. During that time, it was known as the RE/MAX Challenge Series, International Truck & Engine Midwest Series and finally the NASCAR AutoZone Elite Division, Midwest Series. NASCAR discontinued the series in 2006 as car counts dwindled.

Tim Olson and Stephen Einhaus formed Cars and Stars Promotions in 2006 to begin a separate series that replaced the defunct ARTGO/NASCAR series. It was sanctioned by the American Speed Association (ASA) and was known as the ASA Midwest Tour. ARCA took over sanctioning the series in 2013 when it began to be known as the ARCA Midwest Tour. Tim Olson, President of the ARCA Midwest Tour, announced that he has sold the ownership of the ARCA Midwest Tour to former Big 8 series director and Rockford Speedway general manager Gregg McKarns. The purchase of ARCA by NASCAR on April 27, 2018 indirectly reunited the series with the series' former sanctioning body. Bob Sargent's Track Enterprises announced to purchase the ARCA Midwest Tour from McKarns at the end of 2022, and rebranded it the ASA Midwest Tour.

== Drivers ==
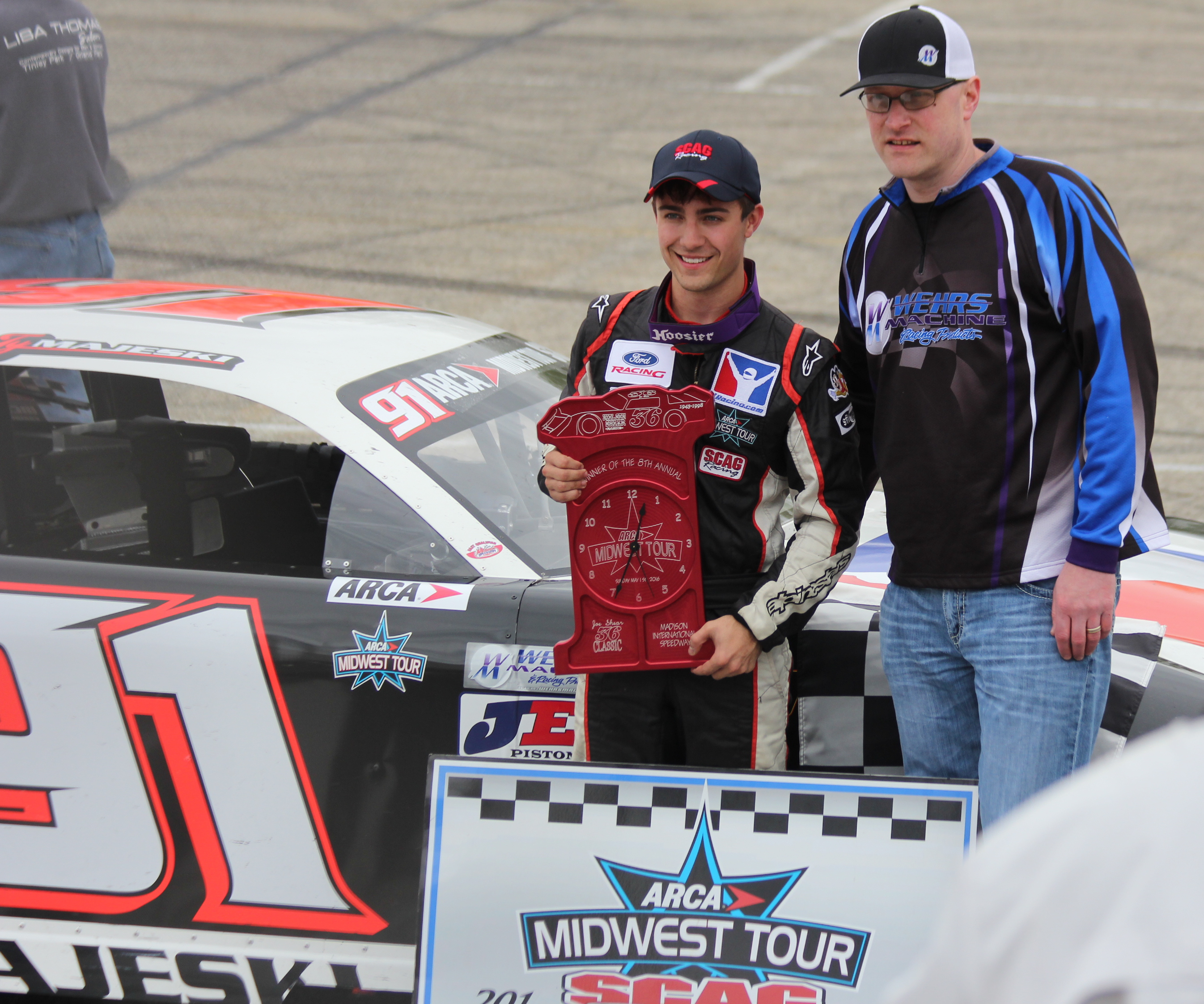
Ty Majeski

The series has its "Touring Stars" program, which recognizes the top drivers committed to racing the whole schedule. The "Touring Stars" are featured throughout the year on posters and event fliers promoting the series, as well as are eligible for pay bonuses at each race.

There have also been many NASCAR stars that have made appearances in the ASA Midwest Tour, such as Aric Almirola, David Ragan, David Stremme, Rusty Wallace, Tony Stewart, Kelly Bires, Kevin Harvick, Landon Cassill, Matt Kenseth, Jeff Green, Ron Hornaday Jr., Kyle Busch, Travis Kvapil, Todd Kluever, Johnny Sauter, Erik Darnell, Scott Wimmer, Ken Schrader, Tim Sauter, Jay Sauter, Dick Trickle, Natalie Decker, Rich Bickle and William Byron.

== 2026 ASA Midwest Tour Schedule ==
Date	Track	Location	Winner
April 26	Slinger Super Speedway	Slinger, Wisconsin	Ty Majeski
May 3	Madison International Speedway	Oregon, Wisconsin	
May 23	Jefferson Speedway	Jefferson, Wisconsin	
June 6	Norway Speedway	Norway, Michigan	
July 11	Hawkeye Downs Speedway	Cedar Rapids, Iowa	
July 24	Madison International Speedway	Oregon, Wisconsin	
August 4	Wisconsin International Raceway	Kaukauna, Wisconsin	
August 15	Dells Raceway Park	Wisconsin Dells, Wisconsin	
September 5	Elko Speedway	Elko, Minnesota	
September 19	Grundy County Speedway	Morris, Illinois	
October 11	La Crosse Fairgrounds Speedway	West Salem, Wisconsin	

== 2025 ASA Midwest Tour Schedule ==
Date	Track	Location	Winner
May 4	Madison International Speedway	Oregon, Wisconsin	Casey Johnson
May 24	Jefferson Speedway	Jefferson, Wisconsin	Jevin Guralski
June 21	Norway Speedway	Norway, Michigan	Dalton Zehr
July 12	Hawkeye Downs Speedway	Cedar Rapids, Iowa	Casey Johnson
July 25	Madison International Speedway	Oregon, Wisconsin	Casey Johnson
August 5	Wisconsin International Raceway	Kaukauna, Wisconsin	Luke Fenhaus
August 16	Grundy County Speedway	Morris, Illinois	Ty Fredrickson
August 30	Dells Raceway Park	Wisconsin Dells, Wisconsin	Gabe Sommers
September 20	Elko Speedway	Elko, Minnesota	Ty Fredrickson
October 5	La Crosse Fairgrounds Speedway	West Salem, Wisconsin	Ty Majeski

== 2024 ASA Midwest Tour Schedule ==
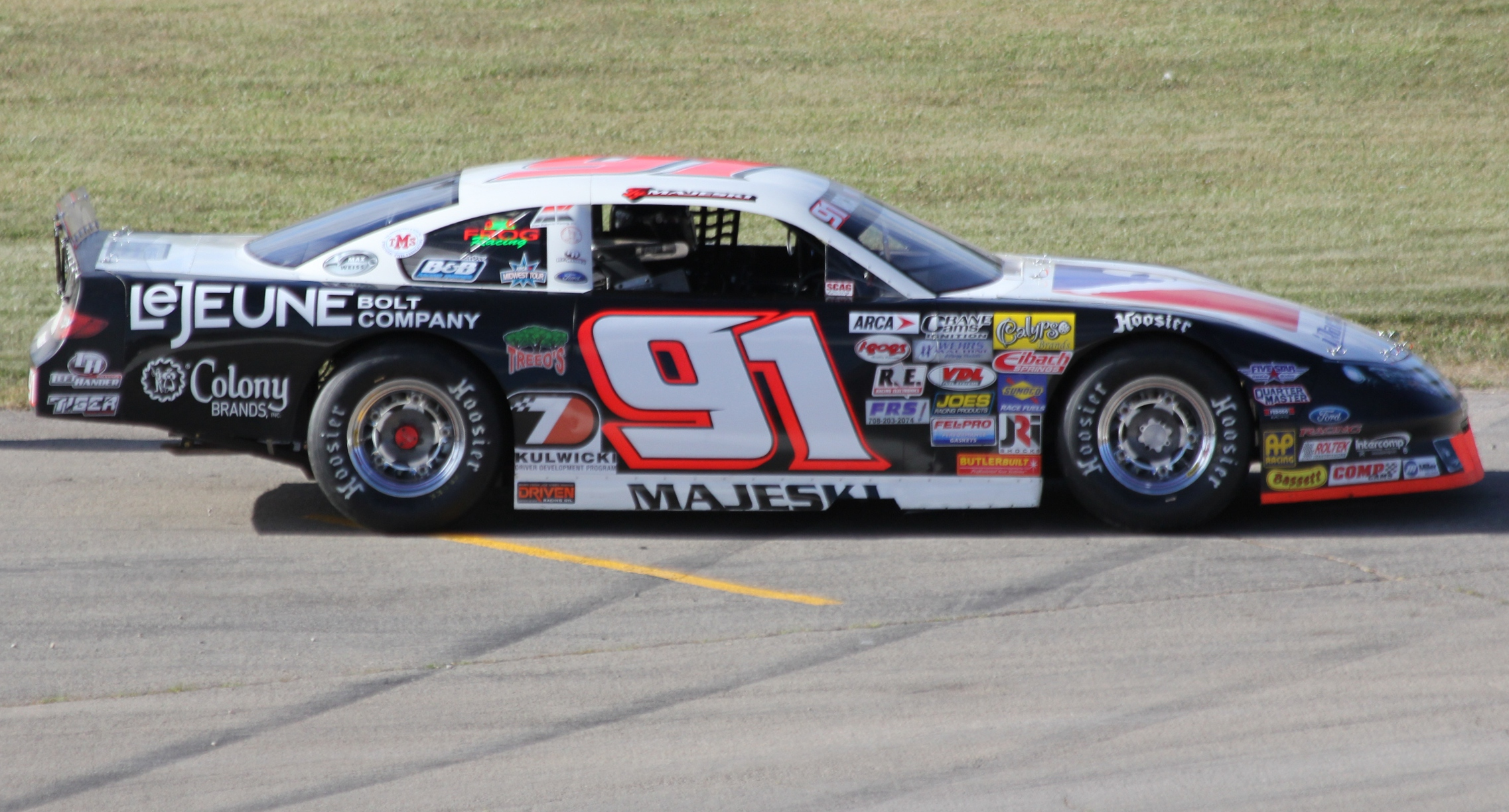
2015 car of champion Ty Majeski

Rnd	Date	Race Name	Track	Location	Fast Qualifier	Winner
1	April 21	Jerry 'The Bear' Priesgen Memorial	Slinger Speedway	Slinger, Wisconsin	Alex Prunty	Ty Majeski
2	May 5	Joe Shear Classic 200	Madison International Speedway	Oregon, Wisconsin	Ty Fredrickson	Ty Majeski
3	May 25	Salute the Troops 100	Jefferson Speedway	Cambridge, Wisconsin	Levon Van der Geest	Ty Majeski
4	July 13	Wayne Carter Classic 100	Grundy County Speedway	Morris, Illinois	Race weekend cancelled due to rain	
5	July 27	Larry Detjens Memorial 125	State Park Speedway	Wausau, Wisconsin	Levon Van der Geest	Justin Mondeik
6	August 1	Gandrud Auto Group 250	Wisconsin International Raceway	Kaunauna, Wisconsin	Ty Majeski	Ty Majeski
7	August 17	Hawkeye 100	Hawkeye Downs Speedway	Cedar Rapids, Iowa	John Beale	Gabe Sommers
8	August 23	Howie Lettow Classic 100	Madison International Speedway	Oregon, Wisconsin	Luke Fenhaus	Dalton Zehr
9	August 31	Jim Sauter Classic 200	Dells Raceway Park	Wisconsin Dells, Wisconsin	Ryan Farrell	Max Kahler
10	September 21	Thunderstruck 93	Elko Speedway	Elko New Market, Minnesota	Jacob Goede	Justin Mondeik
11	October 6	Oktoberfest 200	La Crosse Fairgrounds Speedway	West Salem, Wisconsin	Andrew Morrissey	Ty Majeski

== Champions and Rookies of the Year ==
Season	Champion	Rookie of the Year
2007	Nathan Haseleu	Jonathan Eilen
2008	Dan Fredrickson	Nick Murgic
2009	Steve Carlson	Jacob Goede
2010	Steve Carlson (2)	Ross Kenseth
2011	Andrew Morrissey	Skylar Holzhausen
2012	Jonathan Eilen	Matt Tifft
2013	Dan Fredrickson (2)	James Swan
2014	Ty Majeski	Ty Majeski
2015	Ty Majeski (2)	Austin Nason
2016	Ty Majeski (3)	Casey Johnson
2017	Ty Majeski (4)	Michael Ostdiek
2018	Dalton Zehr	Billy Mohn
2019	Casey Johnson	Gabe Sommers
2020	Casey Johnson (2)	
2021	Ty Majeski (5)	Luke Fenhaus
2022	Casey Johnson (3)	Harley Jankowski
2023	Gabe Sommers	Bryan Syre-Keske
2024	Gabe Sommers (2)	Ty Fredrickson
2025	Casey Johnson (4)	Kody King

== Tracks ==
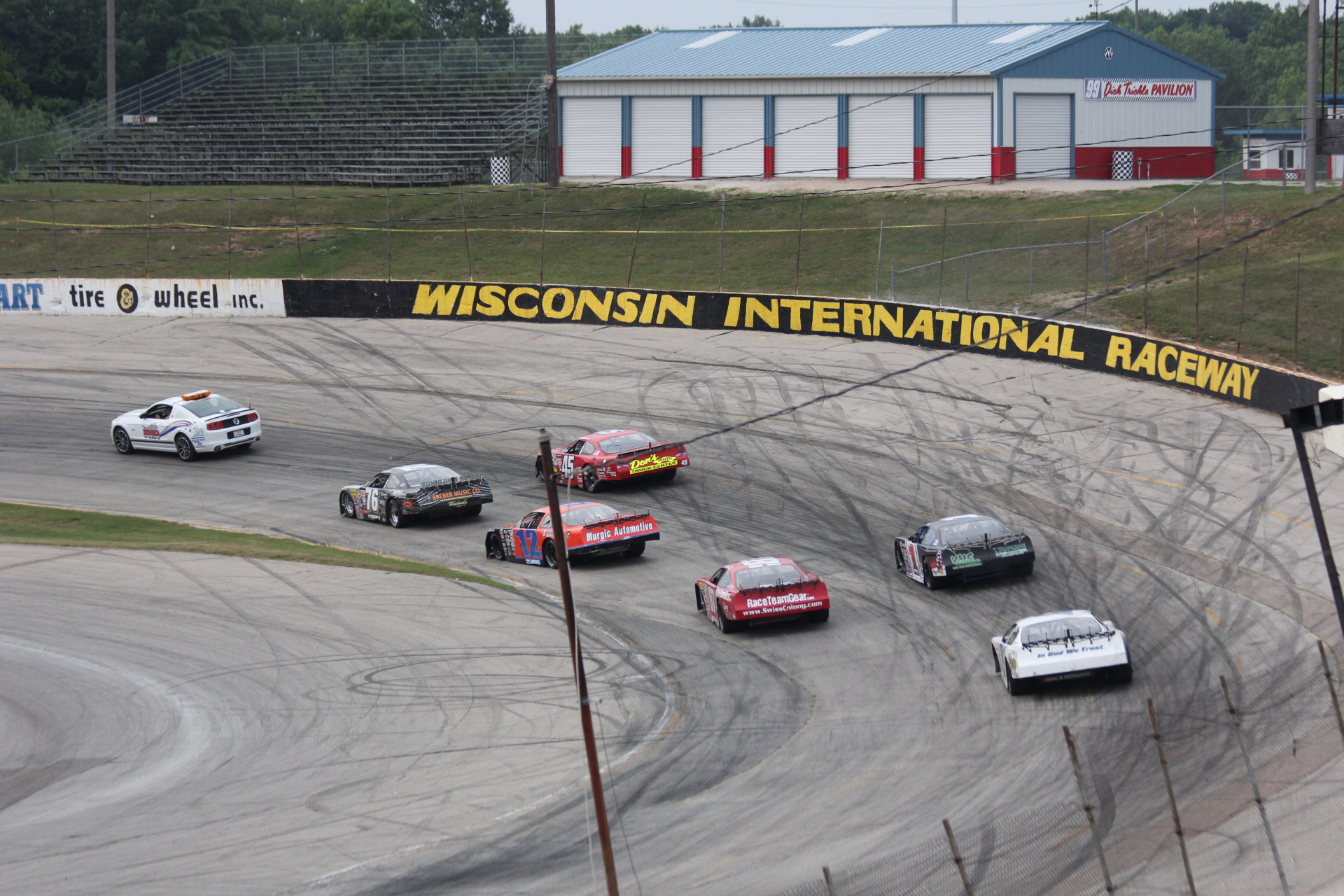
2014 race at Wisconsin International Raceway

The series has raced at 23 different race tracks, mainly in the Upper Midwest:

Track	Town	State	Races
Madison International Speedway	Oregon	Wisconsin	21
La Crosse Fairgrounds Speedway	West Salem	Wisconsin	16
Elko Speedway	Elko	Minnesota	14
Wisconsin International Raceway	Kaukauna	Wisconsin	14
Dells Raceway Park	Wisconsin Dells	Wisconsin	14
Grundy County Speedway	Morris	Illinois	12
State Park Speedway	Wausau	Wisconsin	12
Hawkeye Downs Speedway	Cedar Rapids	Iowa	8
Marshfield Superspeedway	Marshfield	Wisconsin	8
Norway Speedway	Norway	Michigan	8
Jefferson Speedway	Cambridge	Wisconsin	7
Milwaukee Mile	West Allis	Wisconsin	7
Rockford Speedway	Loves Park	Illinois	6
Illiana Motor Speedway	Schererville	Indiana	5
Raceway Park	Shakopee	Minnesota	5
Iowa Speedway	Newton	Iowa	4
Toledo Speedway	Toledo	Ohio	2
Gateway International Speedway	Madison	Illinois	2
Golden Sands Speedway	Plover	Wisconsin	2
Berlin Raceway	Marne	Michigan	1
I-94 Speedway	Sauk Centre	Minnesota	1
Nashville Fairgrounds Speedway	Nashville	Tennessee	1
Slinger Speedway	Slinger	Wisconsin	1

== See also ==
- ACT
- CARS Tour
- PASS
- SRL Southwest Tour
