= Marshfield Motor Speedway =

- Location: Marshfield, Wisconsin
- Coordinates: 44.65444°N 90.25481°W
- Opened: 1977
- Former names: Marshfield Super Speedway; Yellow River Speedway
- Major events: ARCA Midwest Tour, Mid-American Stock Car Series, TUNDRA Super Late Models, Midwest Truck Series

Oval
- Surface: asphalt
- Length: 0.5 miles (0.8 km)
- Turns: 4

Marshfield Motor Speedway is a half-mile asphalt oval motor racetrack built by Jim Langreck that is located at 10853 County Rd H, 3.5 miles west of Marshfield, Wisconsin. The land the track sits on was originally purchased by Mr. Langreck in 1972. The track opened as a half-mile clay oval in 1977. It held a Dairyland Midget Series race in 1985.

In 1995 the track was paved for the start of the 1996 racing season. Wayne Brevik managed the track starting in 2006. The track features Late Models, Super Stocks, Pure Stocks, and two 4-cylinder classes.

Several touring series have visited the track including ARCA Midwest Tour and the Mid-American Stock Car Series.

== Notable drivers ==
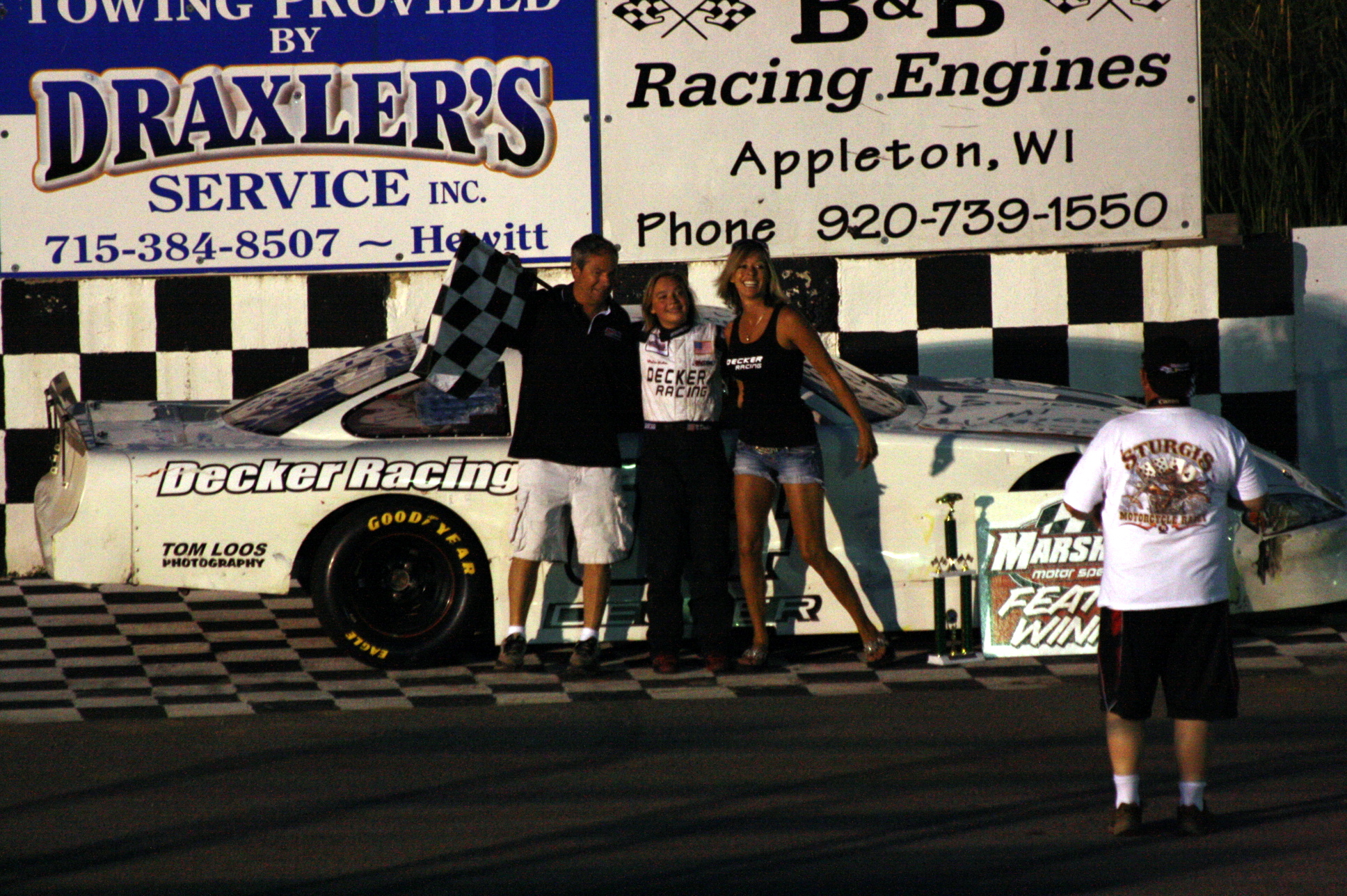
Natalie Decker in victory lane with her 2012 Super Stock

Drivers from the track who have progressed to NASCAR:

- Claire Decker
- Paige Decker
- Natalie Decker
- Paul Menard

== Images ==
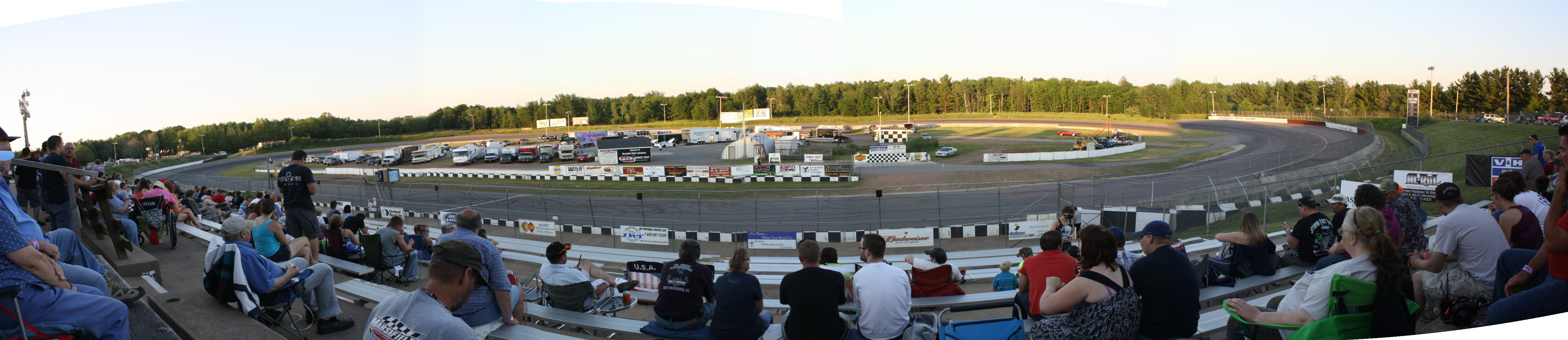
Panorama in 2012
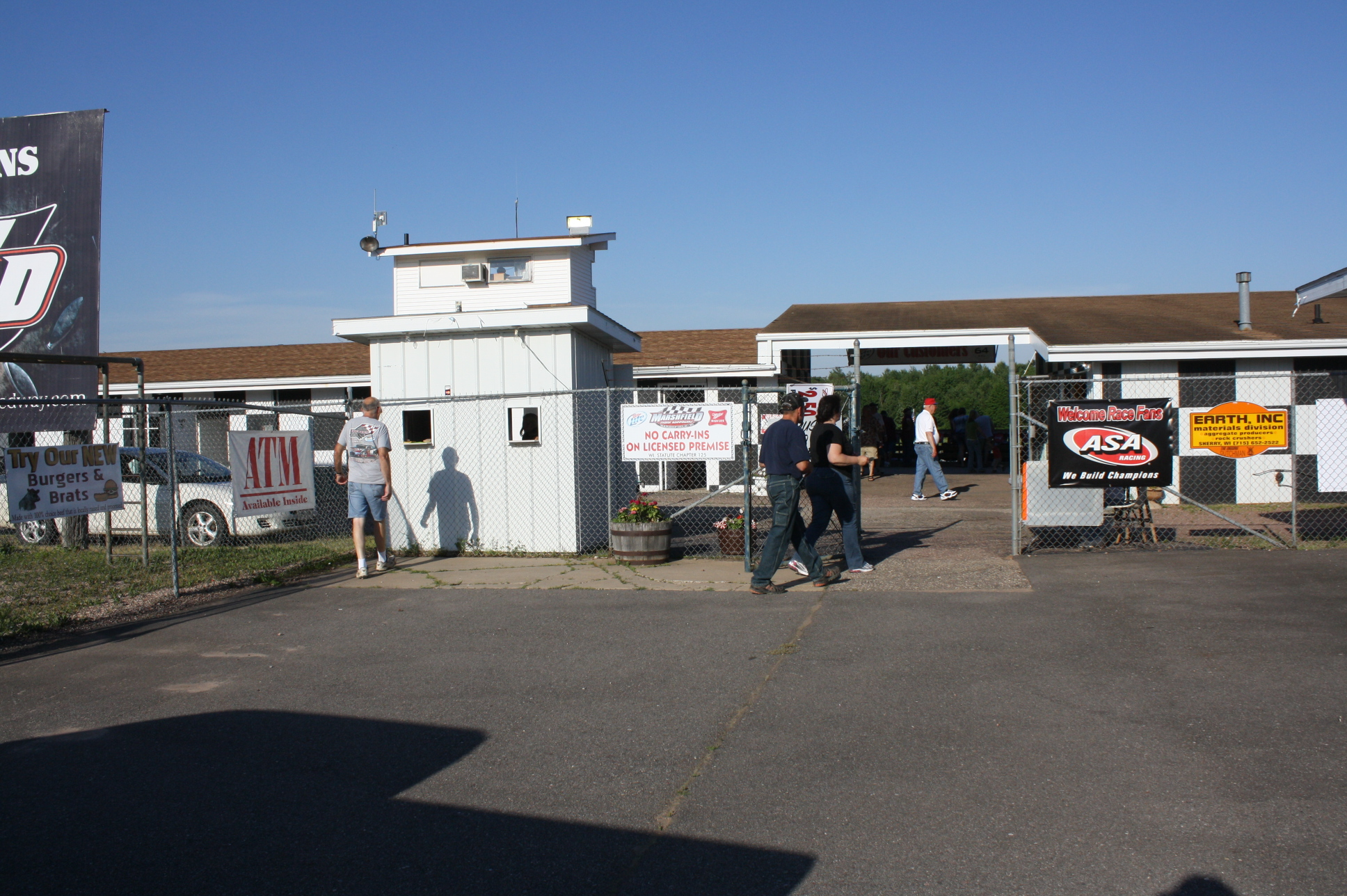
Ticket booth in 2012

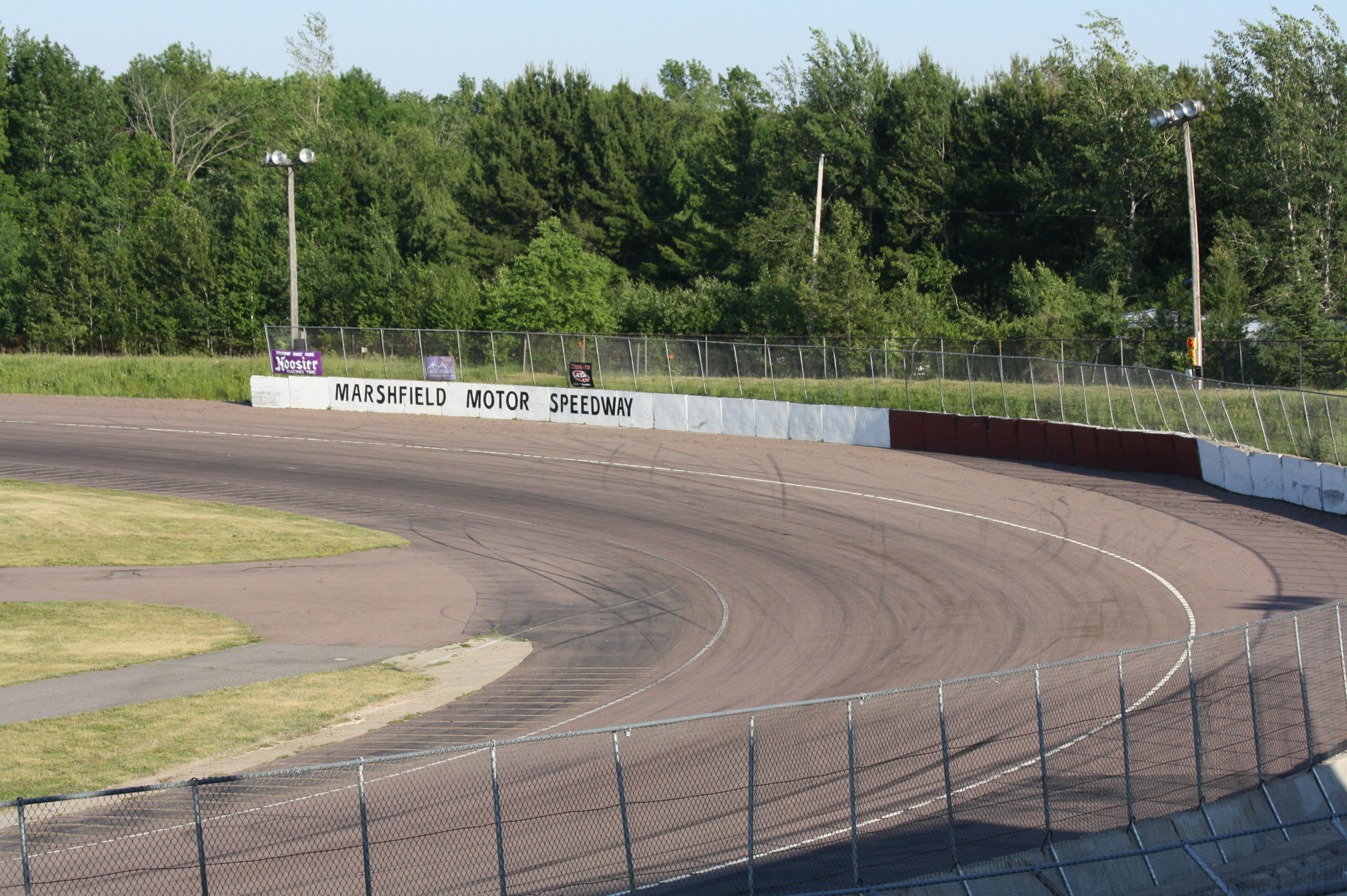
Turn 1 in 2012

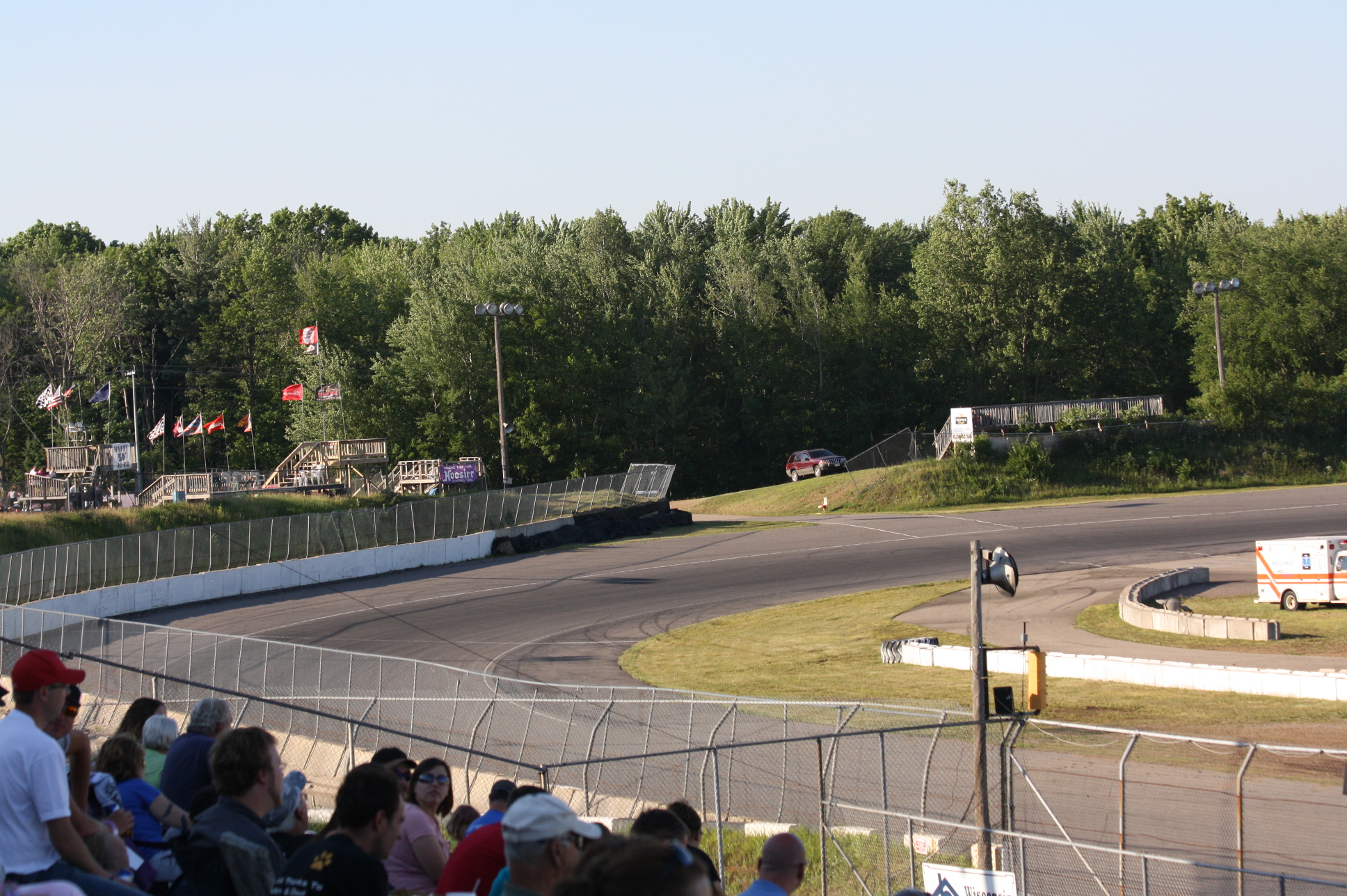
Turn 4 in 2012

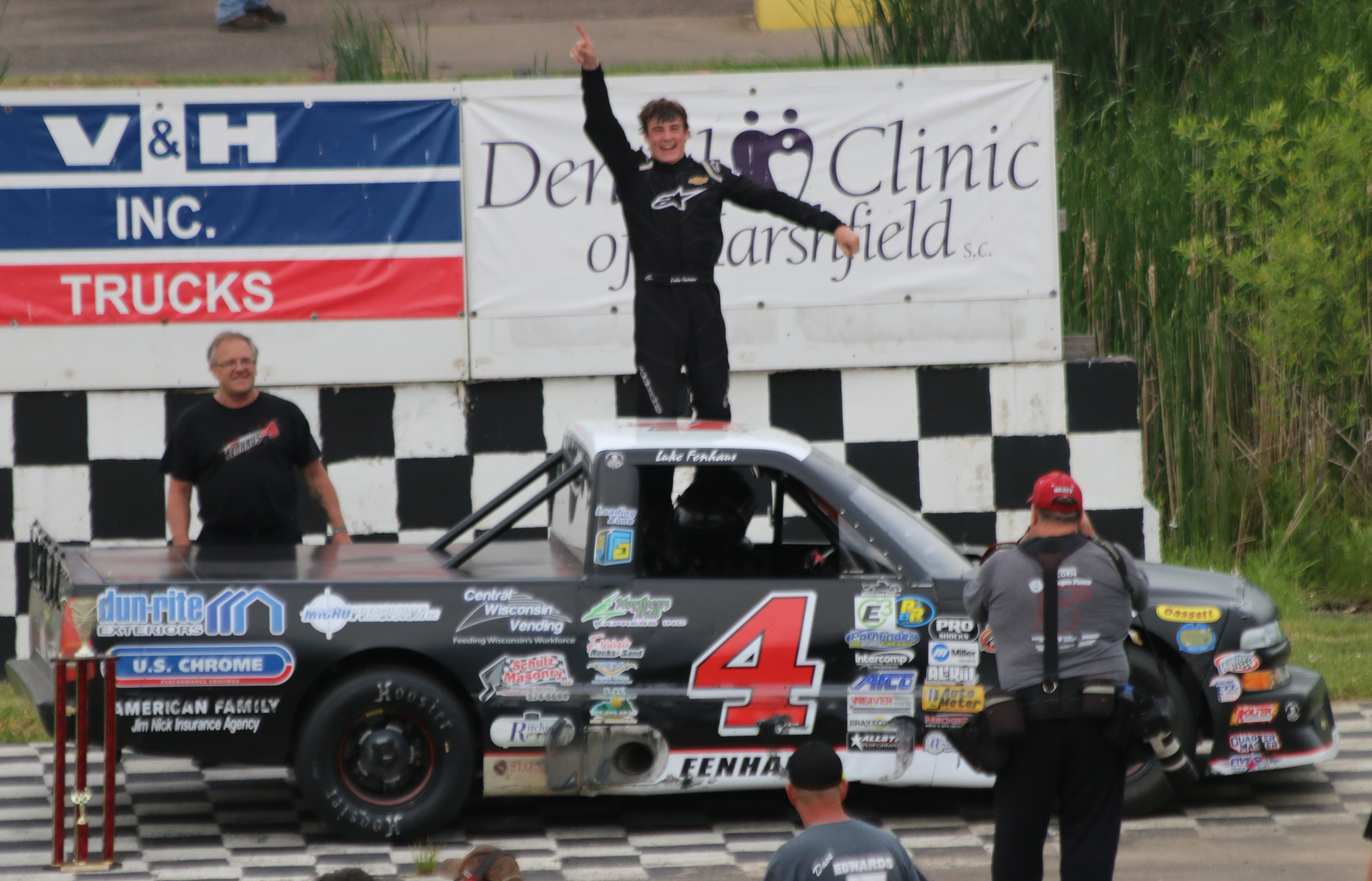
2018 Midwest Truck series winner Luke Fenhaus in Victory lane

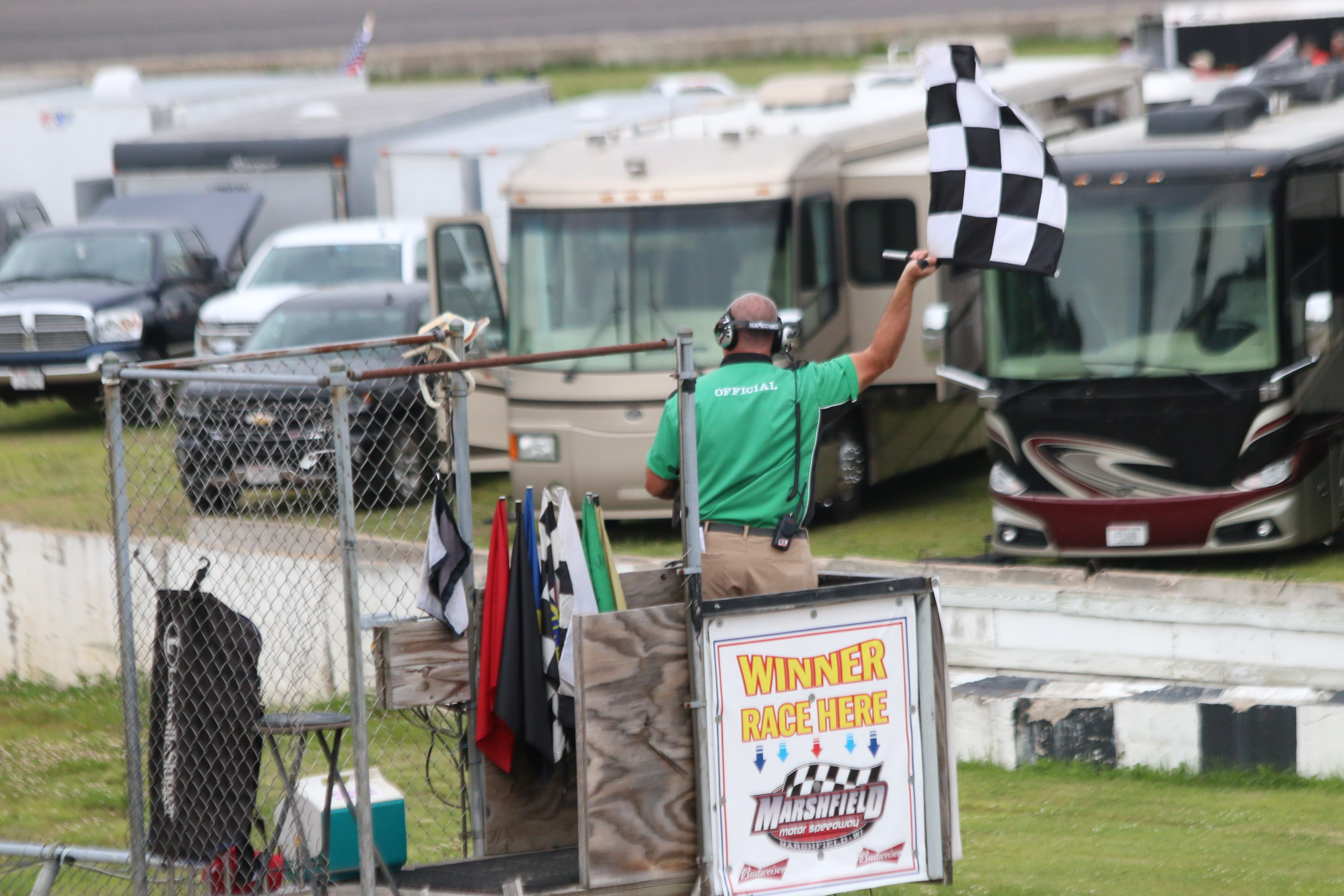
The flagman displays the checkered flag in 2018
