= Todd Hansen =

American racing driver

- Born: February 15, 1982 (age 44); Minneapolis, Minnesota, U.S.

ARCA Menards Series career
- 19 races run over 4 years
- Best finish: 43rd (2006)
- First race: 2006 PFG Lester 150 (Nashville)
- Last race: 2009 Prairie Meadows 200 (Iowa)
Wins	Top tens	Poles
0	3	0
- Statistics up to date as of June 12, 2024.

Todd Hansen (born February 15, 1982) is an American professional stock car racing driver who has previously competed in the ARCA Re/Max Series.

== Racing career ==
Prior to his ARCA career, Hansen competed in the NASCAR Midwest Series from 2001 to 2005, where he got a best points finish of seventeenth in 2002, and a best result of eighth at Kentucky Speedway.

In 2006, Hansen made his debut in the ARCA Re/Max Series at Nashville Superspeedway, driving the No. 39 Chevrolet for his own team in Bill Hansen Racing, where he qualified in eighth and finished in seventh place. He then made four more starts that year, getting two top-ten finishes at Nashville and Michigan International Speedway, it was also during this year that he ran in select NASCAR Midwest Series starts, where he achieved a best finish of seventh at La Crosse Fairgrounds Speedway, as well as a select start in the Southwest Series at Phoenix International Raceway, where he finished in 43rd due a crash on the opening lap. After both the Midwest and Southwest Series both folded, Hansen remained in ARCA in 2007, this time running two races for Country Joe Racing in the No. 32 Dodge, where he finished thirteenth at Kansas Speedway and 36th at Kentucky due to a crash. He then ran four races for Bill Hansen Racing, failing to finish in all events with best result of 31st at Iowa Speedway due to a crash.

In 2008, Hansen remained with the now renamed Hansen Motorsports, this time solely driving the No. 77 Chevrolet, where he ran in five races and got a best result of twelfth at Kentucky. Afterwards, he ran only two ARCA races in 2009, finishing fifteenth at Michigan whilst driving the No. 17, and a finishing thirteenth at Iowa whilst driving the No. 28. He has not competed in the series since then, as he has since competed in series such as the United States Modified Touring Series, the Mastell Brothers Touring Series, the Northern Renegades Non-Winged Sprint Car Series, the UMSS Traditional Sprint Car Series, and the Upper Midwest Sprint Car Series.

== Motorsports results ==
=== ARCA Re/Max Series ===
(key) (Bold – Pole position awarded by qualifying time. Italics – Pole position earned by points standings or practice time. * – Most laps led. ** – All laps led.)

ARCA Re/Max Series results
Year	Team	No.	Make	1	2	3	4	5	6	7	8	9	10	11	12	13	14	15	16	17	18	19	20	21	22	23	ARMC	Pts	Ref
2006	Bill Hansen Racing	39	Chevy	DAY	NSH; 7	SLM	WIN	KEN; 38	TOL	POC	MCH; DNQ																43rd	895	
2006	Bill Hansen Racing	53	Chevy									KAN; DNQ	KEN	BLN	POC	GTW	NSH; 10	MCH; 11	ISF	MIL; 8	TOL	DSF	CHI; 33	SLM	TAL	IOW	43rd	895	
2007	Country Joe Racing	32	Dodge	DAY	USA	NSH	SLM	KAN; 14	WIN	KEN; 36	TOL																56th	490	
2007	Bill Hansen Racing	39	Chevy									IOW; 31	POC	MCH	BLN	KEN; 33	POC	NSH; 34	ISF	MIL; 35	GTW	DSF					56th	490	
2007	Bill Hansen Racing	53	Chevy																				CHI; DNQ	SLM	TAL	TOL	56th	490	
2008	Hansen Motorsports	77	Chevy	DAY	SLM	IOW; 31	KAN; 40	CAR	KEN; 12	TOL	POC	MCH; 36	CAY	KEN; DNQ	BLN	POC	NSH	ISF	DSF	CHI; 18	SLM	NJE	TAL	TOL			55th	485	
2009	Hansen Motorsports	17	Chevy	DAY	SLM	CAR	TAL	KEN	TOL	POC	MCH; 15	MFD															78th	320	
2009	Hansen Motorsports	28	Chevy										IOW; 13	KEN	BLN	POC	ISF	CHI	TOL	DSF	NJE	SLM	KAN	CAR			78th	320	
