= Raceway Park (Minnesota) =

Race track in Shakopee, Minnesota

Coordinates: 44°47′38″N 93°26′07″W

"Minnesota's Action Attraction"
- Location: Shakopee, Minnesota
- Capacity: Not Known
- Owner: John Hellendrung
- Broke ground: 1950
- Opened: 1954, as dirt
- Closed: 2013
- Major events: ASA Midwest Tour

Oval
- Surface: Asphalt
- Length: 0.40 km (0.25 mi)
- Turns: 4

Raceway Park, was a 1/4 mile Asphalt oval race track located near Valleyfair in Shakopee, Minnesota. Raceway Park was sanctioned by NASCAR Home Tracks. It earlier was a dirt track. The track announced on its Facebook page that it was permanently closing after the 2013 season on September 1, 2013.

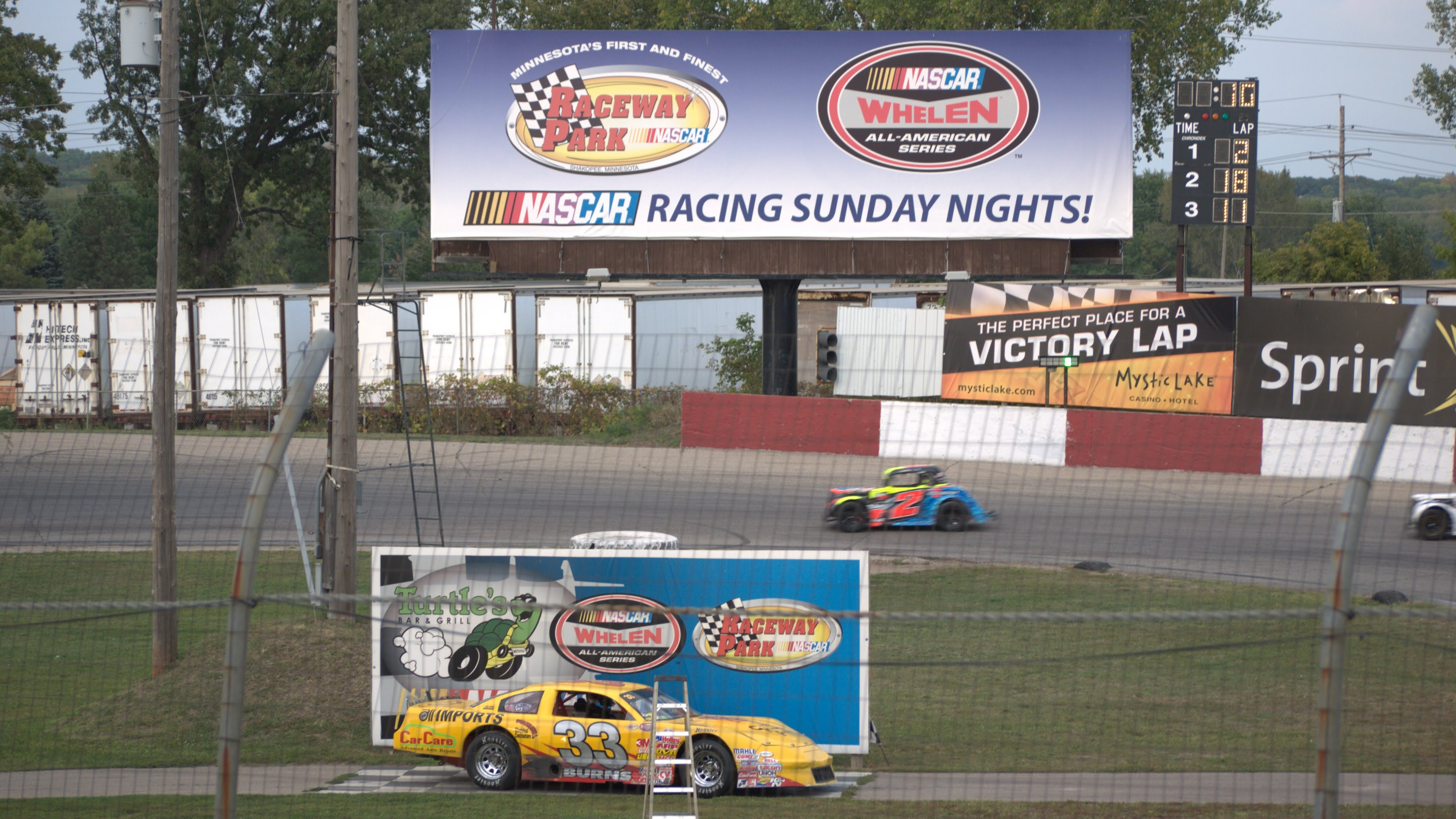
Raceway Park, September 2, 2012

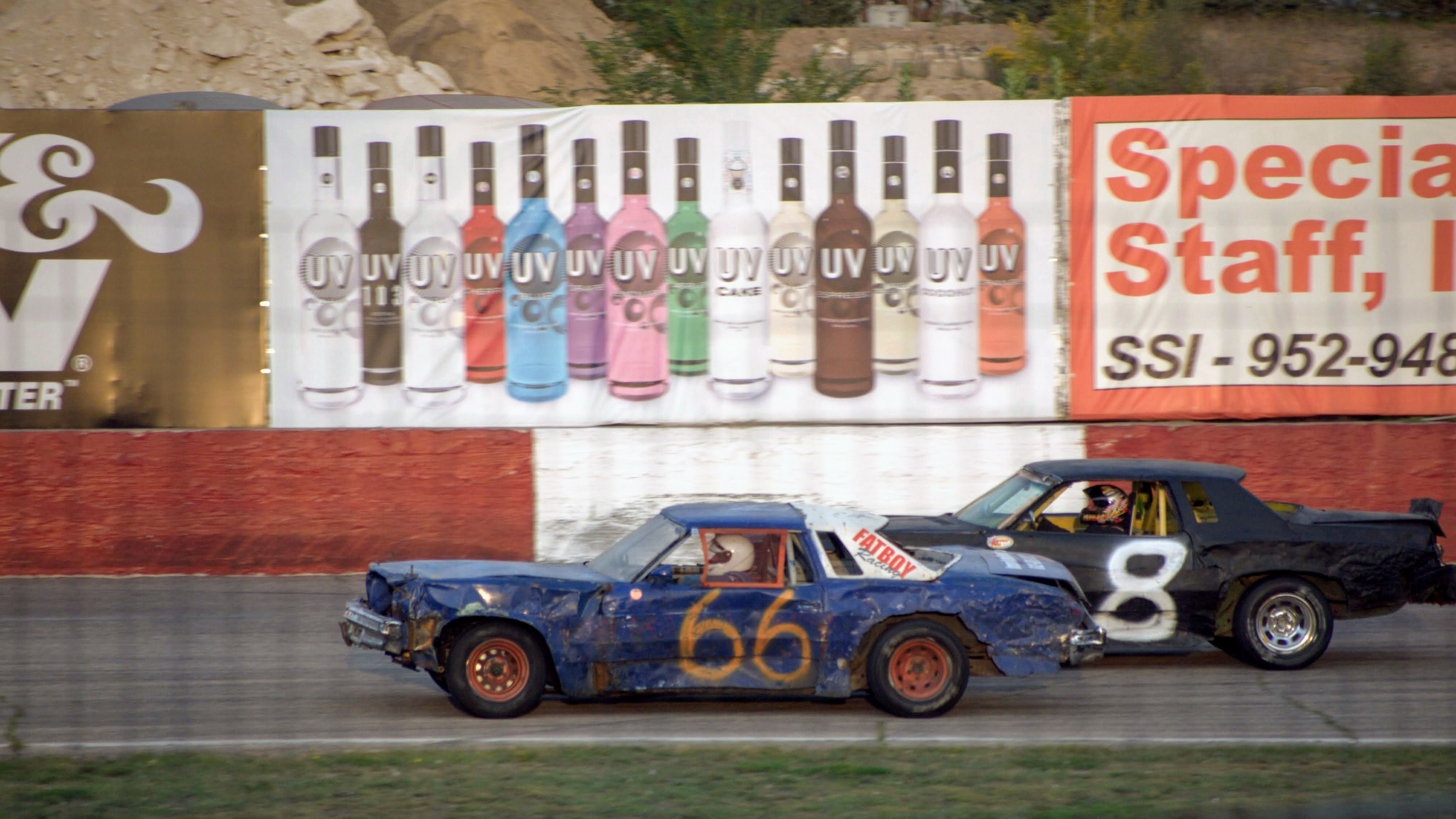
From September 2, 2012

A short clip of a figure 8 race at Raceway Park on 2 September, 2012

== Divisions ==
Super Late Models, Hobby Stocks, Short Trackers, Bombers, Figure 8s, Mini Stocks, Front Wheel Flyers, bus racing, and demolition derby, Flag Pole.

== Traveling series ==
The ASA Midwest Tour held events at the track. The track has held Mid-American Stock Car Series events in their now-defunct Super Truck division. The NASCAR Midwest Series ran two races at the track, between 2005 and 2006.

== See also ==
- 2008 Shakopee 100
