= Boris Jurkovic =

American racing driver (born 1969)

- Born: November 8, 1969 (age 57); Monee, Illinois, U.S.

NASCAR FedEx Freight Truck Series career
- 2 races run over 2 years
- Best finish: 80th (2006)
- First race: 2006 Missouri-Illinois Dodge Dealers Ram Tough 200 (Gateway)
- Last race: 2007 Missouri-Illinois Dodge Dealers Ram Tough 200 (Gateway)
Wins	Top tens	Poles
0	0	0
- Statistics up to date as of March 28, 2026.

Boris Jurkovic (born November 8, 1969) is an American professional stock car racing driver who has competed in the NASCAR Craftsman Truck Series for two races from 2006 to 2007, both for SS-Green Light Racing.

In 2021, Jurkovic was involved in a crash at Berlin Raceway, where he was hit by oncoming car while being stationary, and suffered patella fractures in both of his legs.

Jurkovic has also previously competed in series such as the CARS Pro Late Model Tour, the ASA STARS National Tour, the ASA CRA Super Series, and the World Series of Asphalt Stock Car Racing, and is a former winner of both the All American 400 at Nashville Fairgrounds Speedway, and the Winchester 400 at Winchester Speedway.

== Motorsports results ==
=== NASCAR ===
(key) (Bold - Pole position awarded by qualifying time. Italics - Pole position earned by points standings or practice time. * – Most laps led.)

==== Craftsman Truck Series ====
NASCAR Craftsman Truck Series results
Year	Team	No.	Make	1	2	3	4	5	6	7	8	9	10	11	12	13	14	15	16	17	18	19	20	21	22	23	24	25	NCTC	Pts	Ref
2006	Green Light Racing	08	Chevy	DAY	CAL	ATL	MAR	GTY; 25	CLT	MFD	DOV	TEX	MCH	MLW	KAN	KEN	MEM	IRP	NSH	BRI	NHA	LVS	TAL	MAR	ATL	TEX	PHO	HOM	80th	88	
2007	Green Light Racing	08	Chevy	DAY	CAL	ATL	MAR	KAN	CLT	MFD	DOV	TEX	MCH	MLW	MEM	KEN	IRP	NSH	BRI	GTW; 21	NHA	LVS	TAL	MAR	ATL	TEX	PHO	HOM	91st	100	

=== CARS Super Late Model Tour ===
(key)

CARS Super Late Model Tour results
Year	Team	No.	Make	1	2	3	4	5	6	7	8	9	CSLMTC	Pts	Ref
2018	N/A	53	Toyota	MYB	NSH; 35	ROU	HCY	BRI	AND	HCY	ROU	SBO	N/A	0	
2020	N/A	53	Toyota	SNM	HCY	JEN	HCY	FCS	BRI	FLC	NSH; 31		N/A	0	

=== ASA STARS National Tour ===
(key) (Bold – Pole position awarded by qualifying time. Italics – Pole position earned by points standings or practice time. * – Most laps led. ** – All laps led.)

ASA STARS National Tour results
Year	Team	No.	Make	1	2	3	4	5	6	7	8	9	10	11	12	ASNTC	Pts	Ref
2023	Reliable Recovery Sources	53	Toyota	FIF; 32	MAD	NWS	HCY	MLW	AND	WIR	TOL	WIN	NSV			113th	5	
2024	Boris Jurkovic	53	Toyota	NSM	FIF	HCY	MAD	MLW	AND	OWO	TOL	WIN	NSV; 24			87th	28	
2025	Boris Jurkovic	53	Toyota	NSM	FIF	DOM	HCY	NPS	MAD	SLG	AND	OWO	TOL	WIN	NSV; 26	71st	26	
