= Hawkeye Downs Speedway =

Motorsport track in the United States

- Location: Cedar Rapids, Iowa, USA
- Coordinates: 41°56′6″N 91°40′51″W
- Owner: Roger Cassill
- Operator: Hawkeye Downs board (non-profit)
- Opened: 1925
- Major events: Current: NASCAR Local Racing Series; ASA Midwest Tour; Mid-Am Racing Series; Former: American Indycar Series (1989-1990, 1997-1998)
- Website: www.hawkeyedowns.org

Half-Mile
- Surface: Asphalt
- Length: 0.80 km (0.5 mi)
- Turns: 4

Quarter-Mile
- Surface: Asphalt/Dirt
- Length: 0.40 km (0.25 mi)
- Turns: 4

Hawkeye Downs Speedway is a short track in Cedar Rapids, Iowa featuring 0.5 mile (0.8 km) and 0.25 mile (0.4 km) oval layouts. It is one of two primarily asphalt racing tracks in the state of Iowa (the other being Iowa Speedway), although Hawkeye Downs has also featured dirt racing on its quarter-mile oval since 2025.

Hawkeye Downs hosts regional NASCAR and ASA races, as well as drag races and drift events, and previously hosted IMCA, ARTGO, and the American Indycar Series.

== Description ==
Hawkeye Downs has two banked ovals. The smaller, quarter-mile oval is contained on the infield of the larger, half-mile oval. Both ovals converge on the front stretch, and a banking of grass fills the space between them.

== History ==
The half-mile oval of Hawkeye Downs initially opened in 1925 as a dirt track called Frontier Park. It has primarily been used for car racing since its opening, although it also hosted horse races and motorcycle races early in its history. Ownership of the track was initially under the Cedar Rapids Chamber of Commerce.

The track was renamed to Cedar Rapids Speedway in 1932. In 1937, a statewide contest was held to update its name again. The winning name, "Hawkeye Downs", was a merger of the two final options: "Hawkeye Park" and "Cedar Downs."

Also in 1937, the city of Cedar Rapids took ownership of the track from a business men's group. In 1949, the city turned this ownership over to the All-Iowa Fair Association, who hosted the All-Iowa Fair at Hawkeye Downs from 1936 to the mid-1960s, when the venue of the fair was changed to Central City.

The quarter-mile dirt oval was added to the infield of the existing track in 1950. In 1989, both ovals were paved and converted to permanent asphalt surfaces. The track was used exclusively for asphalt racing from that point until 2025, when the quarter-mile oval was temporarily converted for dirt racing.

== Events ==
=== NASCAR ===
Hawkeye Downs was sanctioned by NASCAR in 2023, and since then has hosted the NASCAR Local Racing Series.

=== Super Late Models ===
Hawkeye Downs hosted an annual super late model race, the Miller 100, from 1973 to 2011. In 2025, Hawkeye Downs again hosted the Miller 100 as part of the 2025 ASA Midwest Tour.
