= Norway Speedway =

Motorsport track in Michigan, United States

Coordinates: 45.7744°N 87.9091°W

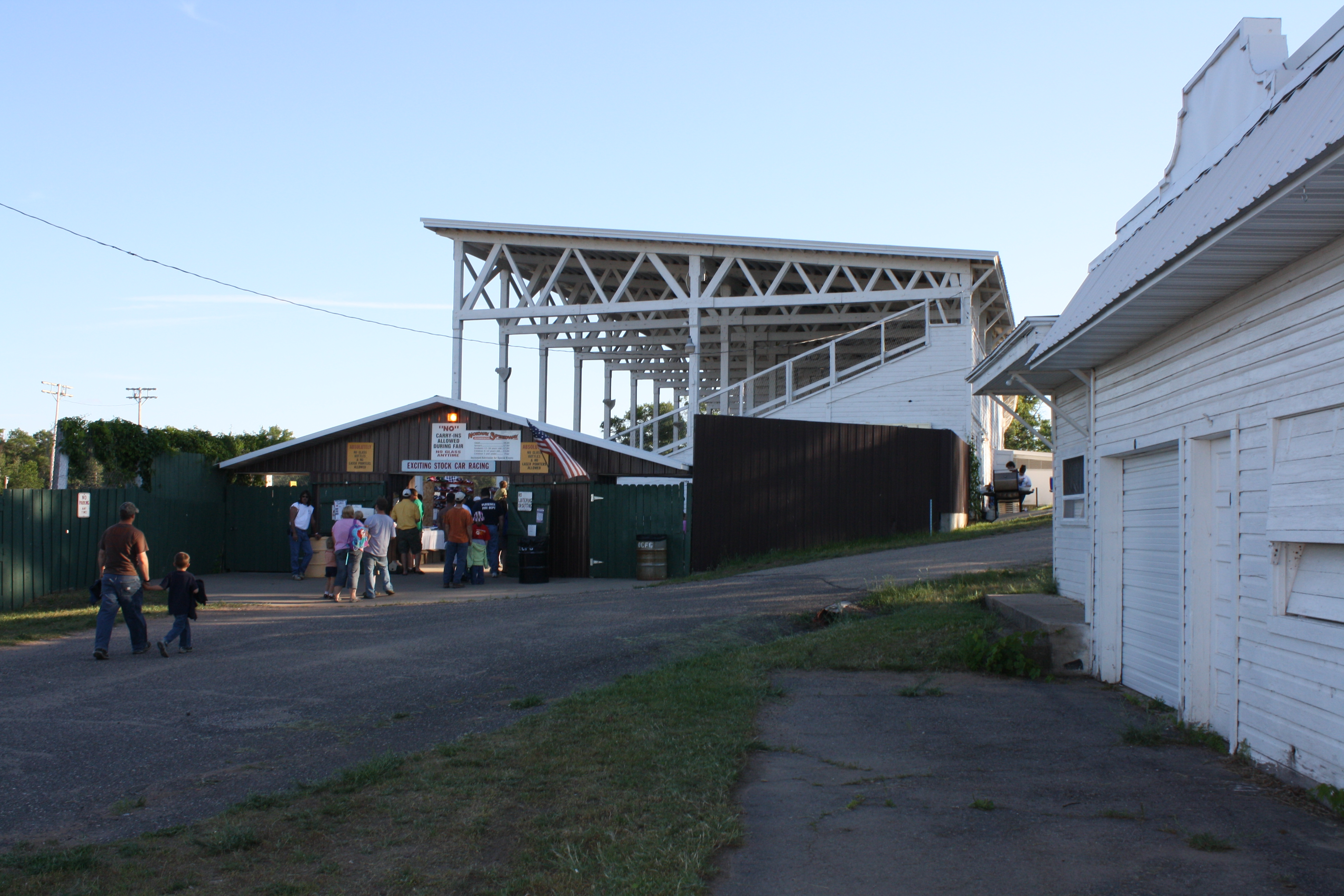
- Grandstand
- Location: Norway, Michigan
- Owner: Dickinson County Fairgrounds
- Operator: Dickinson County Racing Association
- Major events: Labor Day 100, Stateline Challenge
- Surface: Asphalt
- Length: 0.54 km (1/3 mi)
- Turns: 4
- Race lap record: 13.925 (John Beale, 2026, Late Model)
- Race lap record: 15.674 (John Komp, 2022, Super Stock)
- Race lap record: 15.345 (Brian Back, 2010, Mid American Stock Car Series)

Norway Speedway, located in Norway, Michigan, is a one-third mile asphalt oval track that is slightly banked. The speedway is located at the Dickinson County fairgrounds along U.S. Route 8. Norway Speedway began as a dirt track in 1942 and was paved in 1978. The track held American Speed Association sanction before the sanctioning body closed. The track holds stock car races on Friday nights from mid-May through Labor Day Weekend which is the weekend of the Dickinson County Fair. The fair has games, carnival rides, a demolition derby, and a livestock building filled with animals. Events include the Auto-Value Challenge Series, Race to a Cure Cancer, the Stateline Challenge and the Labor Day 100 championship race held during the Dickinson County Fair. The ARCA Midwest Tour, Mid-American Stock Car Series, and the TUNDRA Super Late Models have raced at the track. The track also features a "Spectator Eliminator" series, which participants can register to compete in a single lap, best of three race format, organized as a bracket style elimination tournament.

As of 2025, the track also features a livestream, that fans at home can utilize to enjoy watching the events every Friday, in the event they cannot make it to the track physically.

On September 6th, 2026, the 13 year Late Model track record (5/18/2013) of 13.951 by Dalton Zehr (119), was beaten by John Beale (5), with a time of 13.925, which was followed up with a 13.940.

The speedway currently has five divisions:

- Late Models (1978 - Present)
- Sportsman (1968 - 1980, 2015 - Present)
- Super Stocks (2001 - Present)
- Stock 4 Cylinders (2001 - Present)
- Wisconsin Sport Trucks (occasional)

The speedway also has six retired divisions:

- Modified (1968 - 1976)
- Hobbystock (1981 - 1984)
- Bomber (1985 - 1989)
- Street Stock (1990 - 2000)
- Slammer (1991 - 2010)
- 4 Cylinder Mods (2014 - 2016)

Track Record Holders (Record times are counted only during Qualifying)

- Late Model - John Beale - 13.925 (9/6/2026)
- Super Stock - John Komp - 15.674 (6/3/2022)
- Mid-American Stock Car Series - Brian Back - 15.345 (7/16/2010)

Track Champions
Year	Late Model	Modified	Superstock	Sportsman	Hobbystock	Bomber	Street Stock	Slammer	4 Cylinder	4 Cylinder (Mods)
1968		Bob Iverson		Jim Barron						
1969		Bob Iverson		Ron Paquette						
1970		Wally Jors		Ron Paquette						
1971		Bob Iverson		Ron Paquette						
1972		Bob Iverson		Ron Paquette						
1973		Bob Iverson		Ron Paquette						
1974		Herb Iverson		Kent Pearson						
1975		Herb Iverson		Kent Pearson						
1976		Jim Peterson		Kent Pearson						
1977				Duke Gardiner						
1978	Bob Iverson			Kent Pearson						
1979	Don Britton			Mike Kelly						
1980	Bob Iverson			Mark Miller						
1981	Bob Iverson				Harold Gagon					
1982	Bob Iverson				Spud Sillis					
1983	Kent Pearson				Al Richie					
1984	Kent Pearson				Al Richie					
1985	Mark Miller					Terry Mott				
1986	Gene Coleman					Don Okler Jr.				
1987	Gene Coleman					Mike Bandini				
1988	Bob Menor					John Osterman				
1989	Gene Coleman					Mark Bubloni				
1990	Bob Menor						Dave Mentel			
1991	Gene Coleman						Pat Temple	David Green		
1992	Bob Menor						Mike Gardner	Dave Clement		
1993	Bob Iverson						Tim Jarvis	Mike Ackerman		
1994	Steve DeBakker						Earl Possi	Greg Pollard		
1995	Jamie Iverson						Mike Gardner	Tim Pollard		
1996	Jamie & Bob Iverson						Tim Jarvis	Greg Pollard		
1997	Dale Peterson						Kris Kelly	Tim Pollard		
1998	Jamie Iverson						Kris Kelly	Tim Pollard		
1999	Mike Gardner						Kris Kelly	Tim Faull		
2000	Mark Schroeder						Bear Stankowicz	Tim Pollard		
2001	Jamie Iverson		Jeff Boettcher					Nick Anderson	Tim Schultz Jr.	
2002	Jamie Iverson		Jeff Boettcher					Jim Stachowicz	Jesse Hedlund	
2003	Kris Kelly		Ryan Windell					Ryan Pollard	Matt Wilcox	
2004	Kris Kelly		Ryan Windell					Travis Reidell	Gary Dubord Jr.	
2005	Jamie Iverson		Ryan Windell					Travis Reidell	Tim Wilcox	
2006	Jamie Iverson		Ron Jenshak					Brian Smith	Bill Delfosse	
2007	Mike Reichenberger		Ron Jenshak					Jim Stachowicz	Jaime Hedlund	
2008	Troy Nelson		Ron Jenshak					John Mattia Jr.	Brian Stanchina	
2009	Troy Nelson		Ron Jenshak					John Mattia Jr.	Mark Moraska	
2010	Troy Nelson		Mark Jenshak					Jim Stachowicz	Cody Skog	
2011	Mike Reichenberger		Mark Jenshak						Fran Berube	
2012	Jay Baumler Jr.		Mark Jenshak						Cody Skog	
2013	Dalton Zehr		Brett Bray						Cody Skog	
2014	Dan Lindsley		Ryan Wender						Bradley Ostermann	Anthony Schiefelbein
2015	Dillon Kralovetz		Brett Bray	Joe Ostermann					Jesse Dolfurd	Anthony Schiefelbein
2016	Dillon Kralovetz		Brett Bray	Joe Ostermann					Elliot Reed	Anthony Schiefelbein
2017	Dillon Kralovetz		Tim Schultz Jr.	Preston Weddel					Cody Skog	
2018	Dillon Kralovetz		Tim Schultz Jr.	Joe Ostermann					Adam Faull	
2019	Dillon Kralovetz		Tim Schultz Jr.	Preston Weddel					Ron Linder / Jake Dulford	
2020	Dan Lindsley		Ryan Wender	Preston Weddel					Dean Bellmore	
2021	Chad Butz / Mike D'Angelo Jr.		Joey Pontbriand	B.J. Schoneck					Dean Bellmore	
2022	Justin Mondeik		Anthony Schiefelbein	Joe Ostermann					Dean Bellmore	
2023	Scott Stanchina		Joey Pontbriand	B.J. Schoneck					Alex Bellmore	
2024	Joey Pontbriand		Ryan Wender	Gary Thom					Eli Whittkopf	
2025	Joey Pontbriand		Ryan Wender	Travis Hulsizer					Trever Cronick	
2026	Joey Pontbriand / Dan Lindsley		Ryan Wender	John Ostermann					Cody Gunville	

Stateline Challenge Winners
Year	Winner	Location	Notes
2026	John Beale	Verona, WI	
2025	Braison Bennett	Neenah, WI	
2024	Andy Monday	Appleton, WI	
2023	Chad Butz	Howard, WI	
2022	Justin Mondeik	Gleason, WI	
2021	Justin Mondeik	Gleason, WI	
2020	Justin Mondeik	Gleason, WI	
2019	Travis Sauter	Prairie Du Sac, WI	
2018	Johnny Sauter	Necedah, WI	
2017	Dalton Zehr	Menominee, MI	
2016	Kris Kelly	Norway, MI	
2015	Dalton Zehr	Menominee, MI	
2014			Tundra Race
2013	Dillon Kralovetz	Bonduel, WI	
2012	Jamie Iverson	Escanaba, MI	
2011	Jamie Iverson	Escanaba, MI	
2010			No Race
2009			No Race
2008			No Race
2007	Mike Reichenberger	Appleton, WI	
2006	Jamie Iverson	Escanaba, MI	
2005	Jamie Iverson	Escanaba, MI	
2004	Jamie Iverson	Escanaba, MI	
2003	Terry Baldry	Omro, WI	
2002	Dale Peterson	Escanaba, MI	
2001	Mark Schroeder	Green Bay, WI	
1999	Mark Schroeder	Green Bay, WI	
1998	Dale Peterson	Bark River, MI	
1997	Terry Baldry	Omro, WI	
1996	Kevin Cywinski	Mosinee, WI	
1995	Kevin Cywinski	Mosinee, WI	
1994	Kevin Cywinski	Mosinee, WI	
1993	Matt Kenseth	Cambridge, WI	
1992	Bob Menor	Wausaukee, WI	
1991	Bob Menor	Wausaukee, WI	
1990	Terry Baldry	Omro, WI	
1989	Allen Check	Stevens Point, WI	
1988	Dick Trickle	Wisconsin Rapids, WI	
1987	Scott Hansen	Green Bay, WI	
1986	Scott Hansen	Green Bay, WI	
1985	Mike Mattson	Marquette, MI	
1984	Mike Kelly	Norway, MI	
1983	Kent Pearson	Kingsford, MI	
1982	Kent Pearson	Kingsford, MI	
1981	Dick Trickle	Wisconsin Rapids, WI	

Spectator Eliminator Champions
Year	Winner
2026	Derek Hansen
2025	Paul Elertson
2024	Paul Elertson
2023	Gerald Dugree Jr.
2022	Ryan Okler
2021	Jim Chartre
2020	Austin McConnell
2019	Austin McConnell
2018	Jim Chartre
2017	Jim Chartre
2016	Jim Chartre

== Images ==
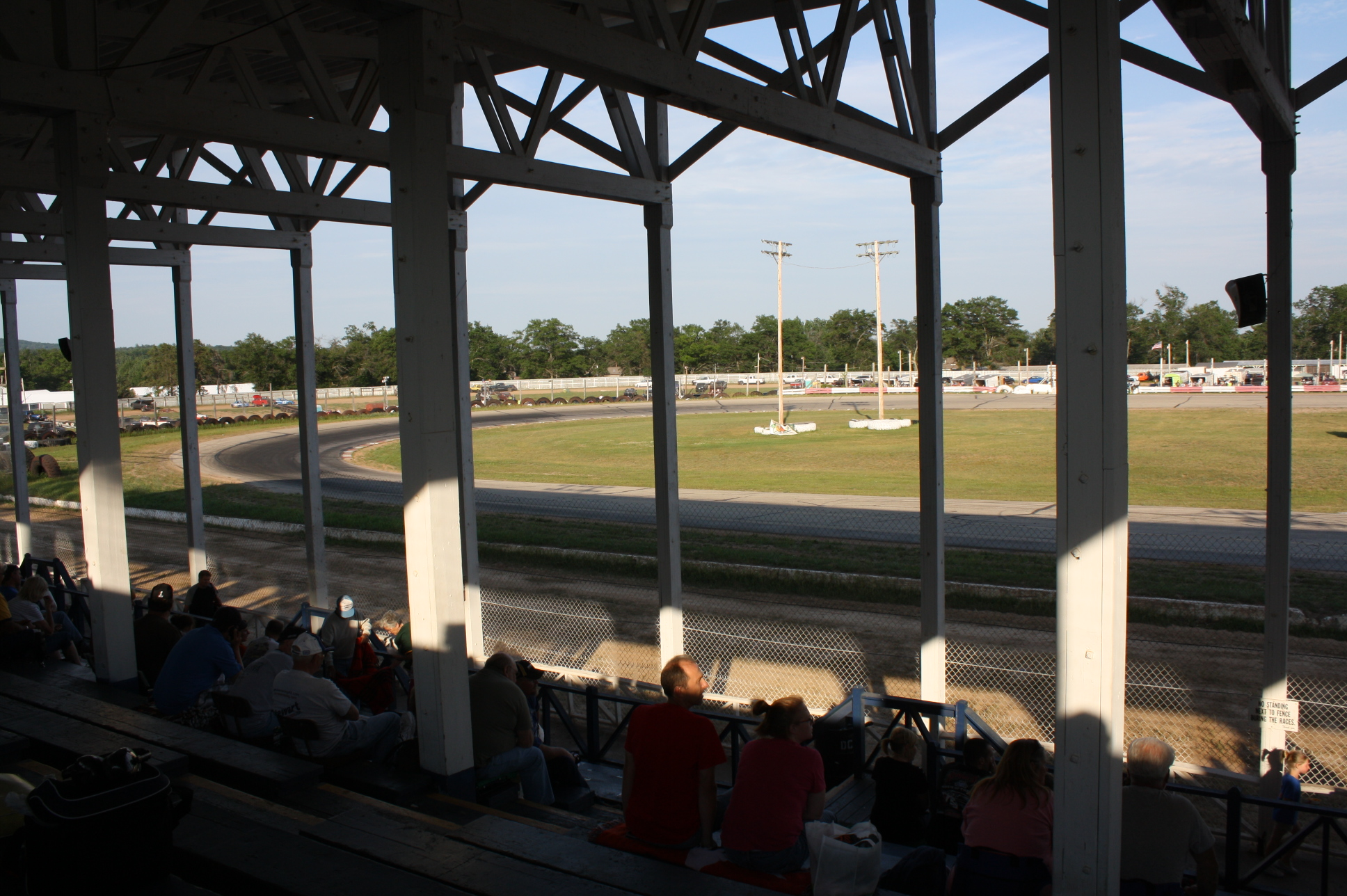
Turns 3 and 4

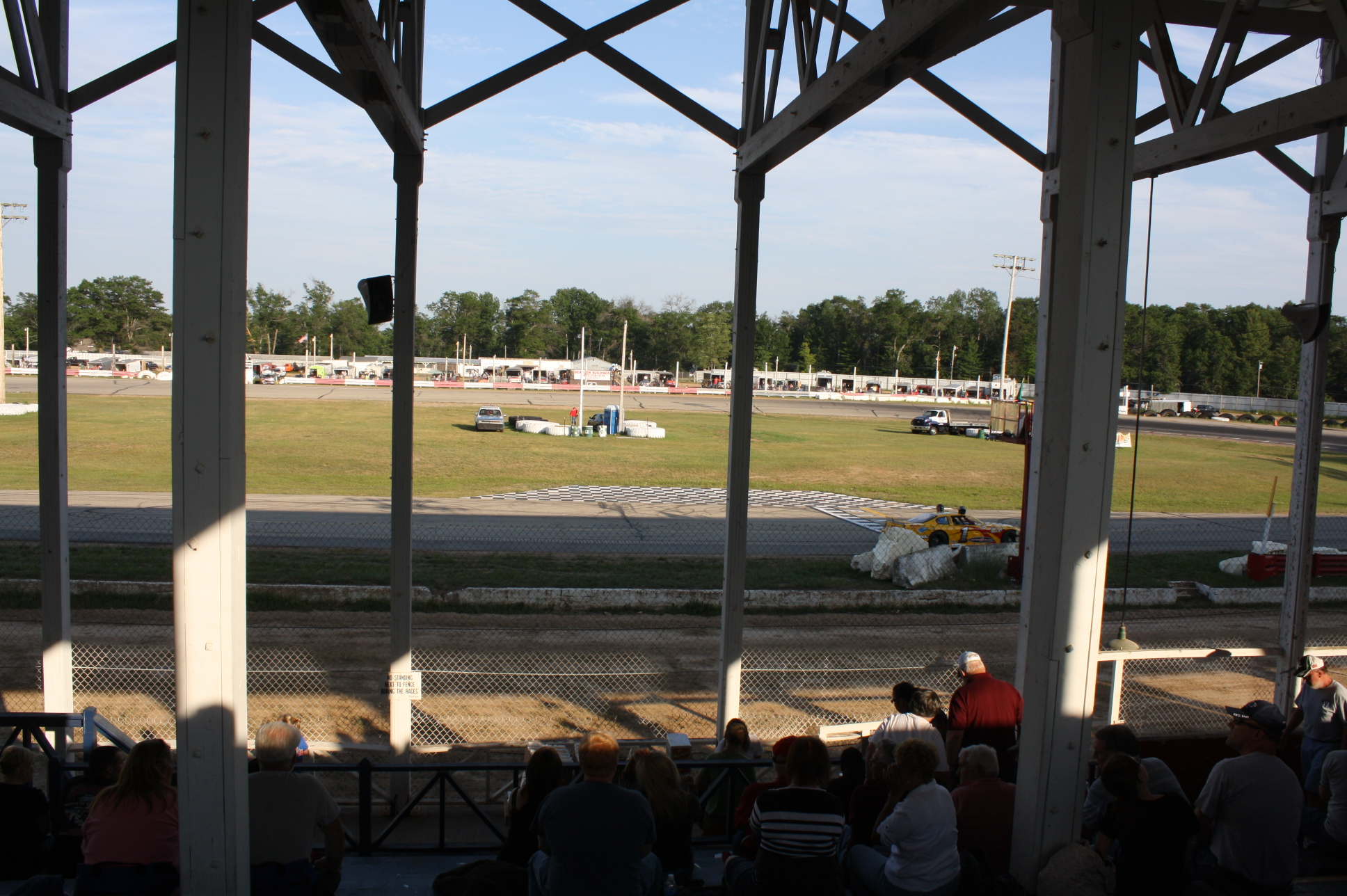
Frontstretch

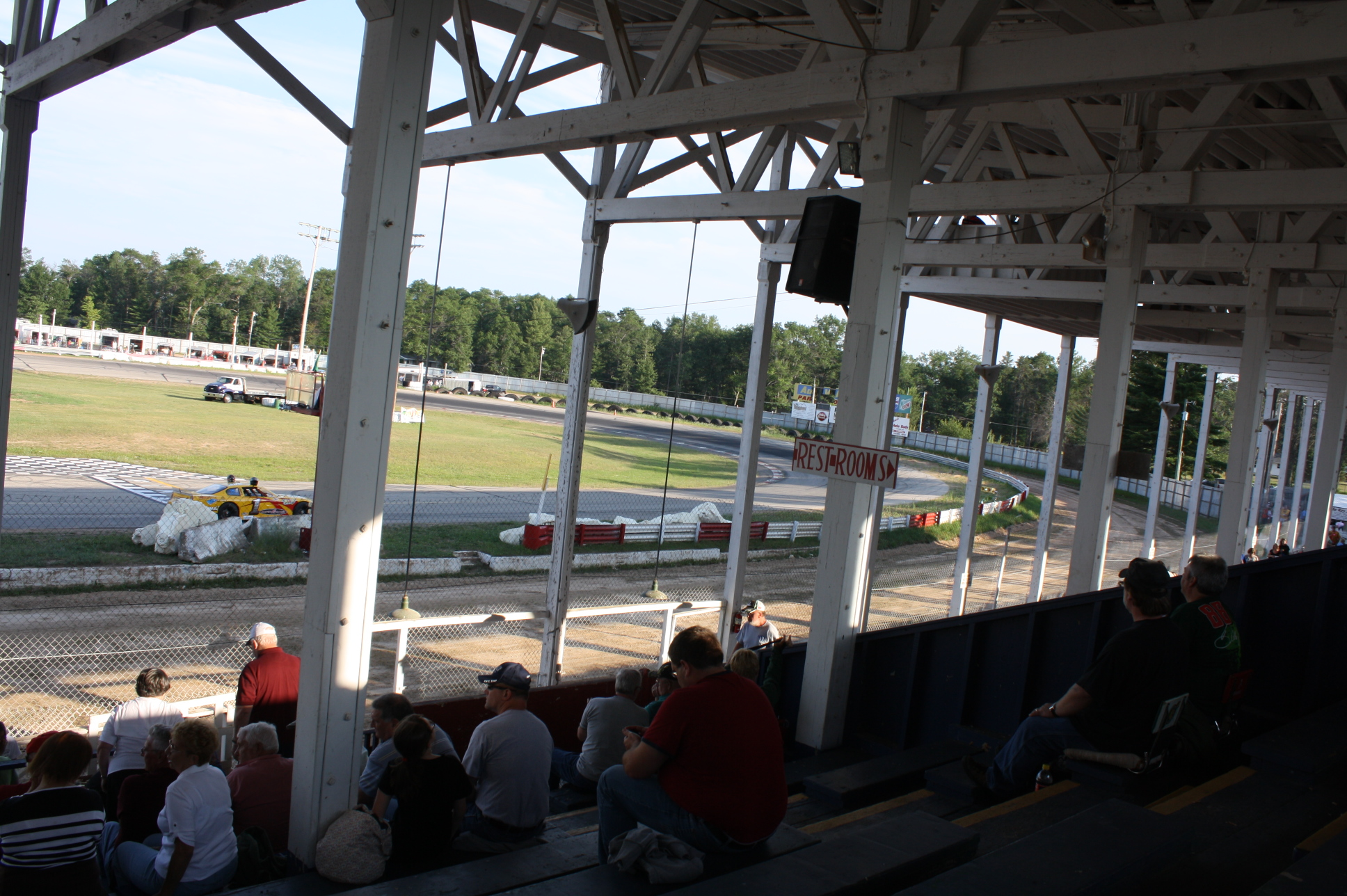
Turns 1 and 2

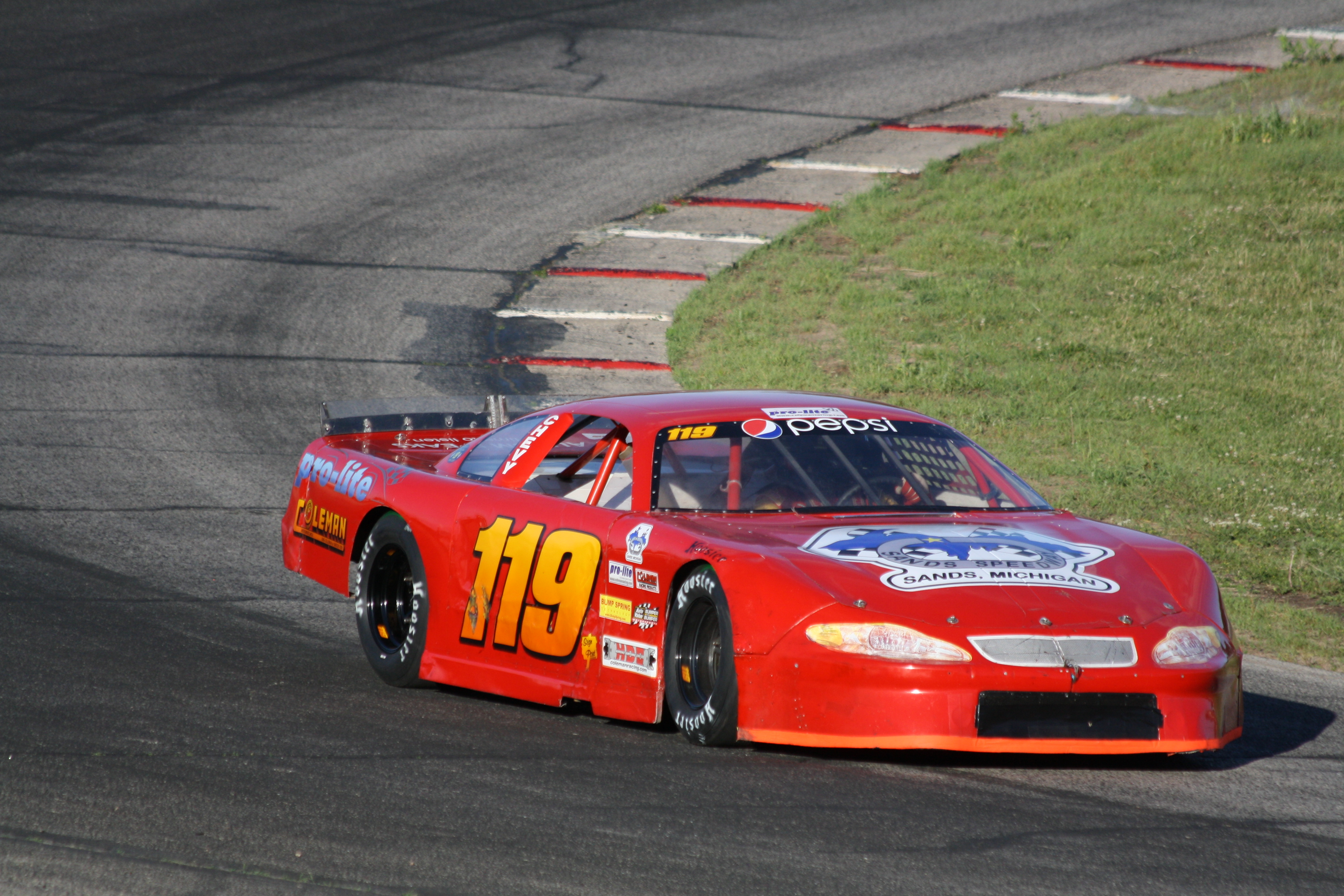
2013 Late Model champion Dalton Zehr racing in Turn 4

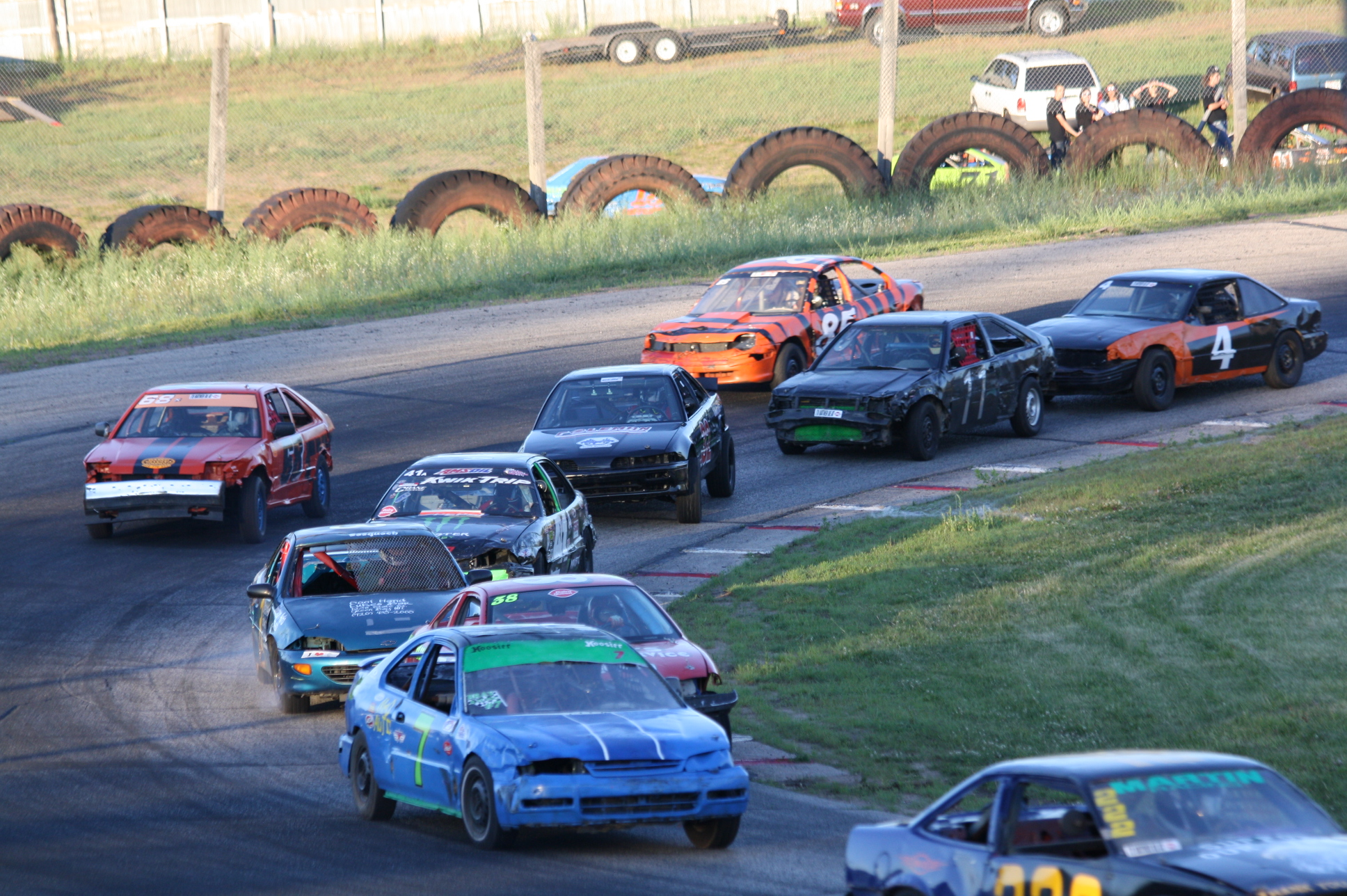
4 cylinders

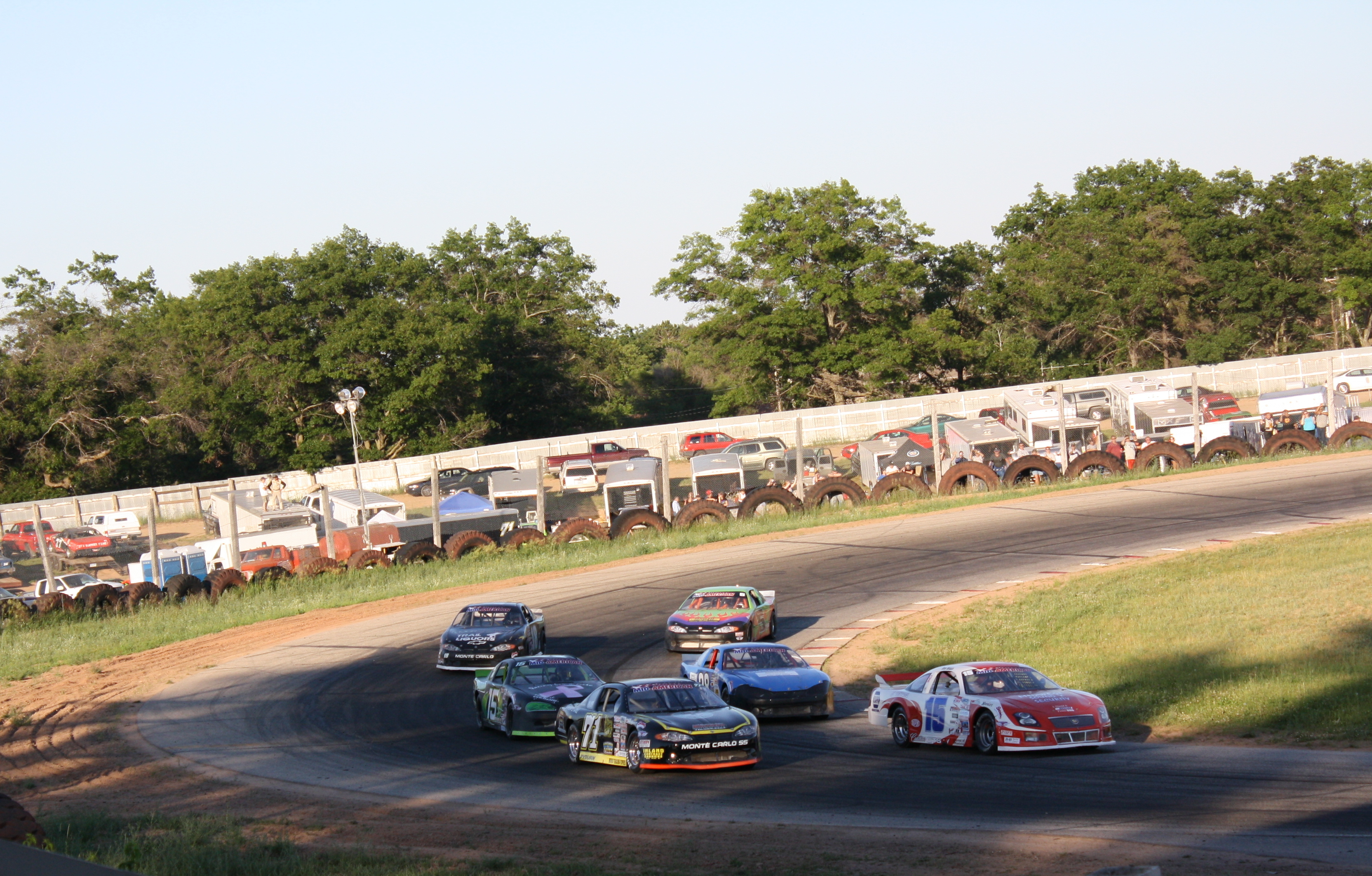
Mid American Stock Car Series cars in 2009
