= Frank Kreyer =

American racing driver

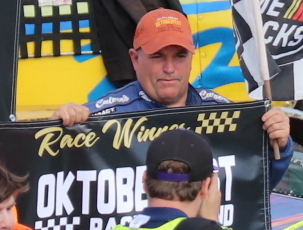
- Kreyer in victory lane at La Crosse in 2019
- Born: May 8, 1970 (age 56); Lyndon Station, Wisconsin, U.S.

NASCAR O'Reilly Auto Parts Series career
- 4 races run over 1 year
- Best finish: 100th (2007)
- First race: 2007 AT&T 250 (Milwaukee)
- Last race: 2007 Arizona Travel 200 (Phoenix)
Wins	Top tens	Poles
0	0	0

NASCAR FedEx Freight Truck Series career
- 2 races run over 1 year
- Best finish: 79th (2007)
- First race: 2007 Kroger 250 (Martinsville)
- Last race: 2007 Ohio 250 (Mansfield)
Wins	Top tens	Poles
0	0	0

Frank Kreyer (born May 8, 1970) is an American racing driver from Wisconsin Dells, Wisconsin. He has started in NASCAR's Craftsman Truck Series and Busch Series.

== Racing career ==
Kreyer began racing in half scale NASCAR cars in the Junior Cup series in 1995. He won four straight championships in 1995 to 1998. He competed in the series part-time in the 1999 season while working on the pit crew for NASCAR Midwest Series driver Jason Schuler.

Kreyer started racing Super Late Models at Madison International Speedway (MIS) and Wisconsin Dells Speedway (now Dells Raceway Park). Kreyer won his first Super Late Model feature at Wisconsin Dells, and was the track's Rookie of the Year.

Kreyer competed full-time at Wisconsin Dells in 2001, finishing third in the final points. He also competed part-time in the Wisconsin Challenge Series that season. Kreyer competed at several tracks in Wisconsin in 2002.

In 2003, Kreyer competed at full-time in the Wisconsin Challenge Series, and at Wisconsin Dells. He finished fourth at both the track and the roaming series. Kreyer competed in the Wisconsin Challenge Series and CRA Super Series in 2004.

Kreyer competed in the Wisconsin Challenge Series for the entire 2005 season, and finished tenth in the final points standings.

Kreyer competed in half of the American Speed Association late model races in 2006, but he was able to score enough points to finish in the Top 20 in points. Kreyer purchased Wisconsin Dells Speedway with two other co-owners, closing on the purchase of the track in February 2007, and renamed the track Dells Raceway Park. The new owners have brought the American Speed Association sanction to the track.

=== NASCAR career ===
Kreyer made his first NASCAR start in the Craftsman Truck Series at the Kroger 250 at Martinsville Speedway on March 31, 2007. He started 27th and finished 28th seven laps behind the leader. He also started 22nd at Mansfield Motorsports Speedway, and finished 34th with motor problems.

Kreyer started two Busch series races in 2007. He started 32nd and crashed out finishing 34th in his home race at the Milwaukee Mile. He started 38th at Gateway International Raceway, and finished 38th with brake problems.

Early in 2007, Kreyer announced that he would be attempting to qualify the Mac Hill Motorsports car for four NASCAR Busch Series races in 2007. He made all four races and had a best finish of 28th at O'Reilly Raceway Park.

== Images ==
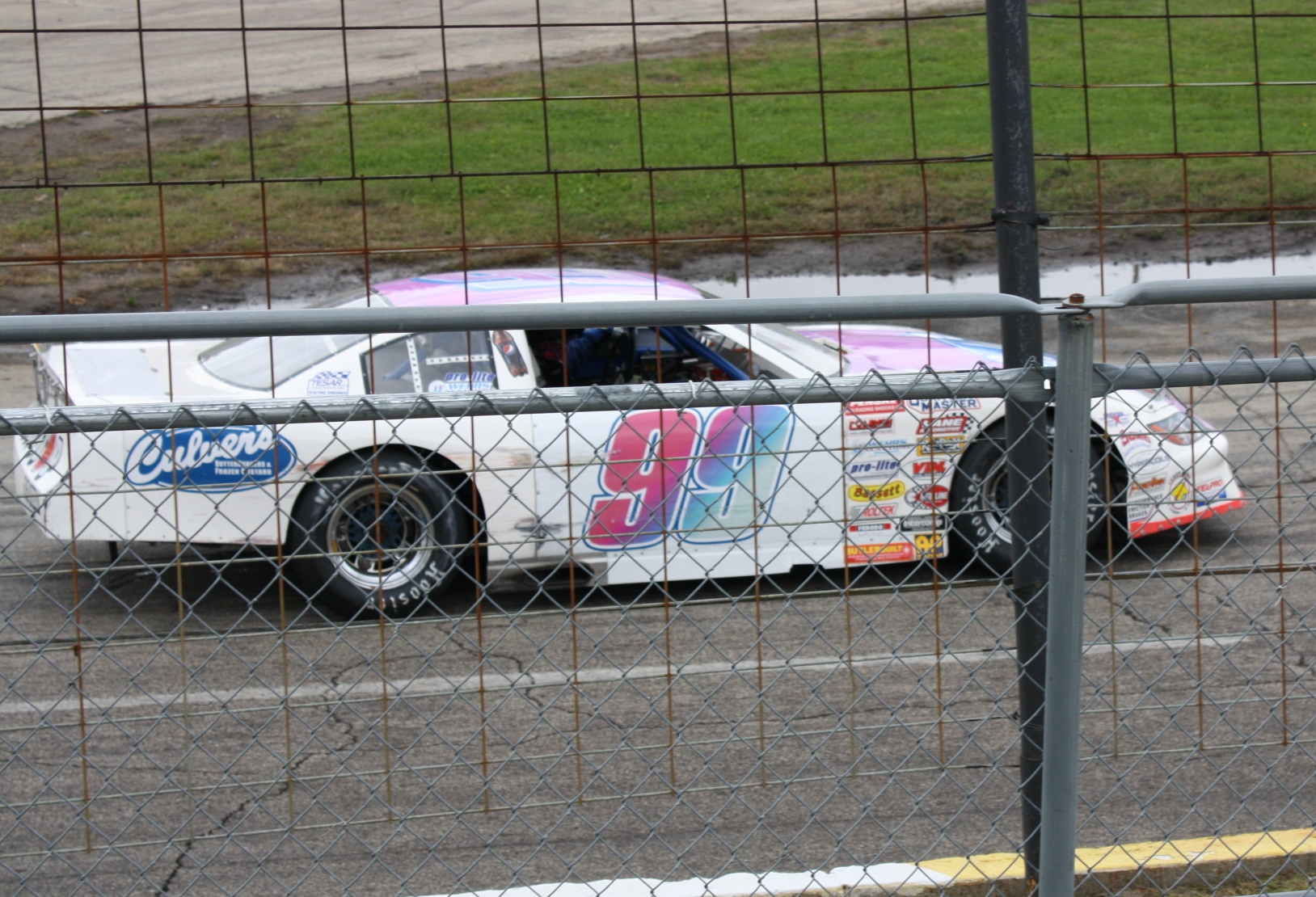
Kreyer's 2009 late model

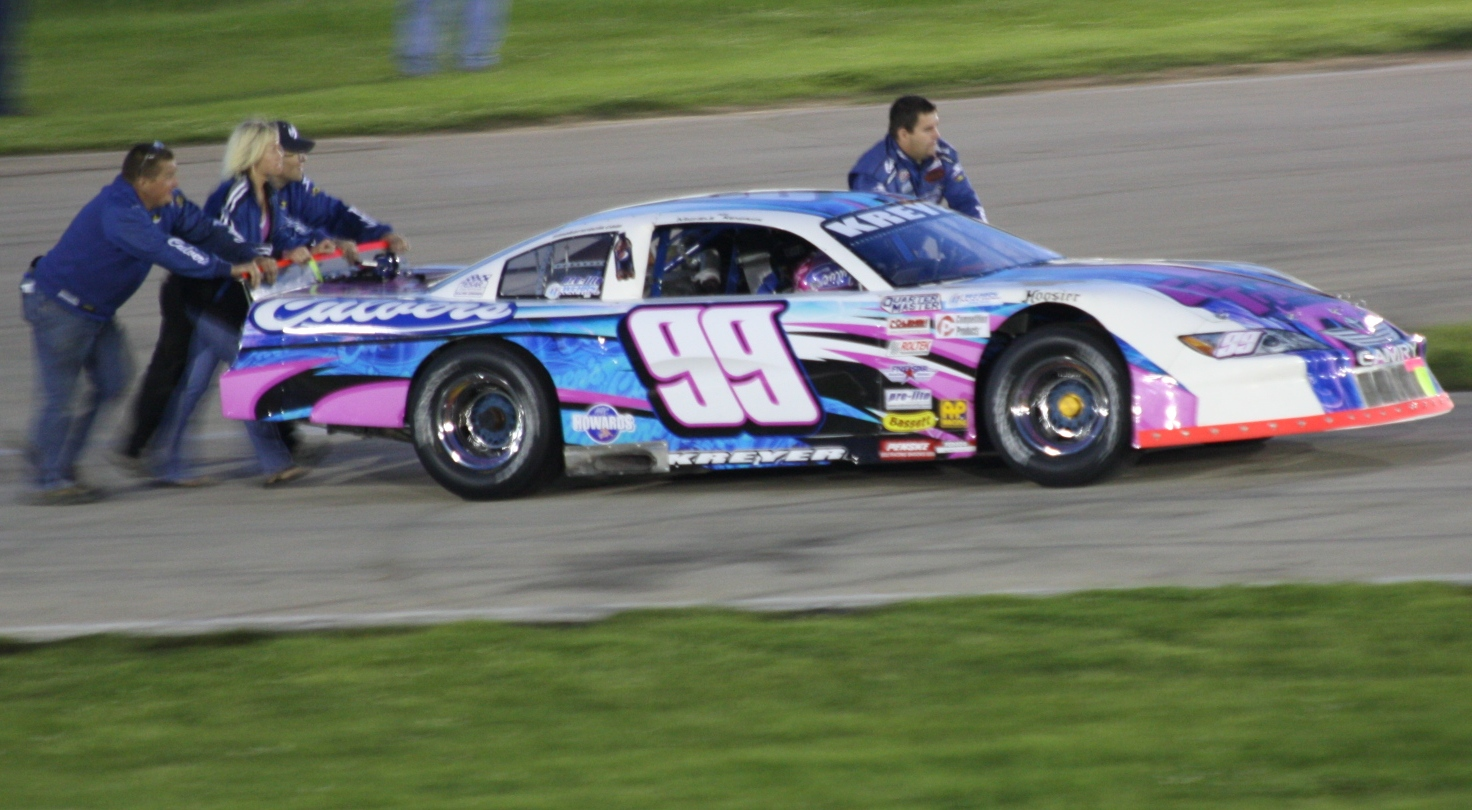
Kreyer and his team pushing his super late model in 2010

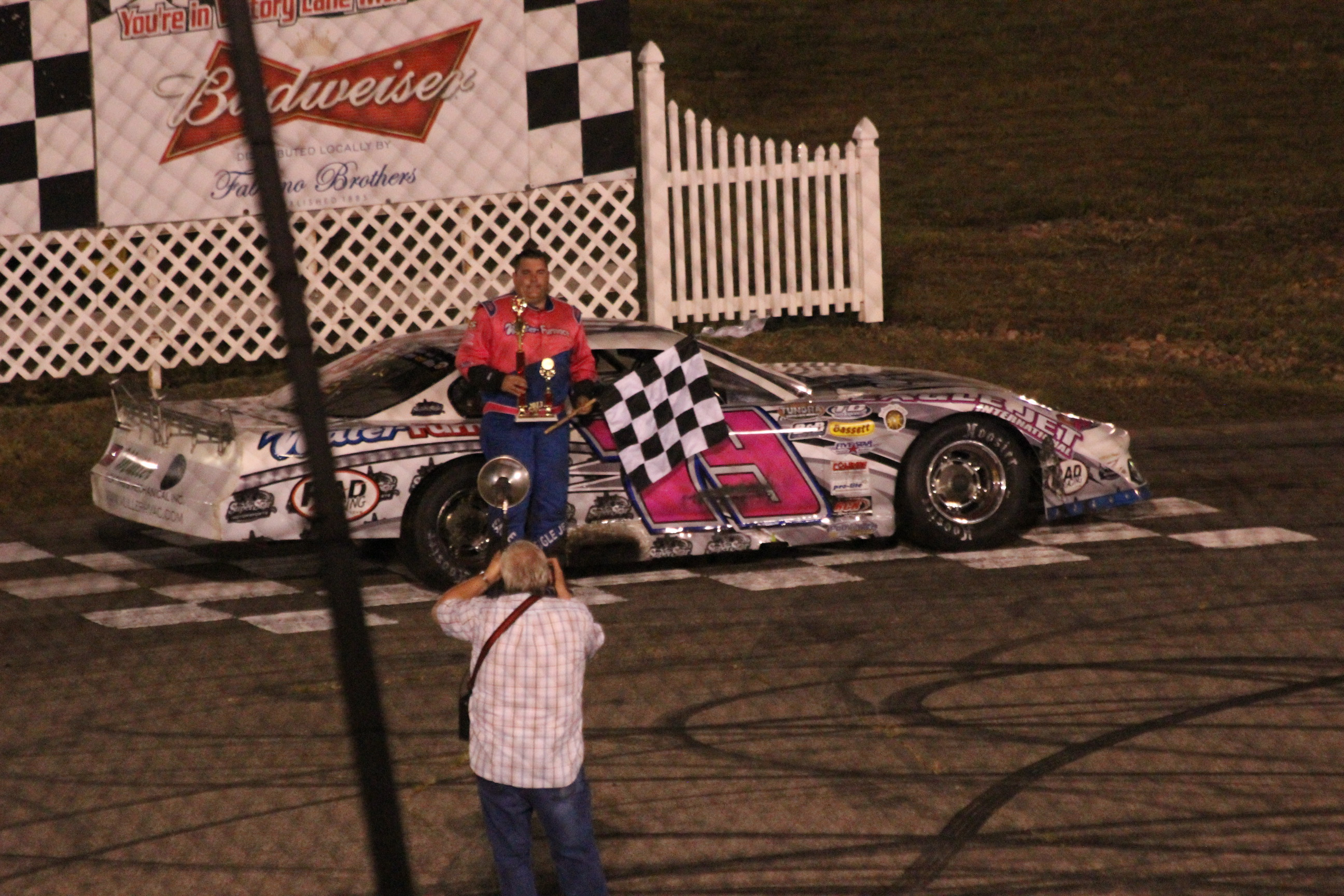
Kreyer in victory lane at Golden Sands Speedway in 2013

== Motorsports career results ==
=== NASCAR ===
(key) (Bold – Pole position awarded by qualifying time. Italics – Pole position earned by points standings or practice time. * – Most laps led.)

==== Busch Series ====
NASCAR Busch Series results
Year	Team	No.	Make	1	2	3	4	5	6	7	8	9	10	11	12	13	14	15	16	17	18	19	20	21	22	23	24	25	26	27	28	29	30	31	32	33	34	35	NBSC	Pts	Ref
2007	Mac Hill Motorsports	56	Chevy	DAY	CAL	MXC	LVS	ATL	BRI	NSH	TEX	PHO	TAL	RCH	DAR	CLT	DOV	NSH	KEN	MLW; 34	NHA	DAY	CHI	GTY; 38	IRP; 28	CGV	GLN	MCH	BRI	CAL	RCH	DOV	KAN	CLT	MEM	TEX	PHO; 42	HOM	100th	226	

==== Craftsman Truck Series ====
NASCAR Craftsman Truck Series results
Year	Team	No.	Make	1	2	3	4	5	6	7	8	9	10	11	12	13	14	15	16	17	18	19	20	21	22	23	24	25	NCTC	Pts	Ref
2007	Key Motorsports	44	Chevy	DAY	CAL	ATL	MAR; 28	KAN	CLT	MFD; 34	DOV	TEX	MCH	MLW	MEM	KEN	IRP	NSH	BRI	GTW	NHA	LVS	TAL	MAR	ATL	TEX	PHO	HOM	79th	140	
