= Dells Raceway Park =

Racetrack

Coordinates: 43°40′34″N 89°50′43″W

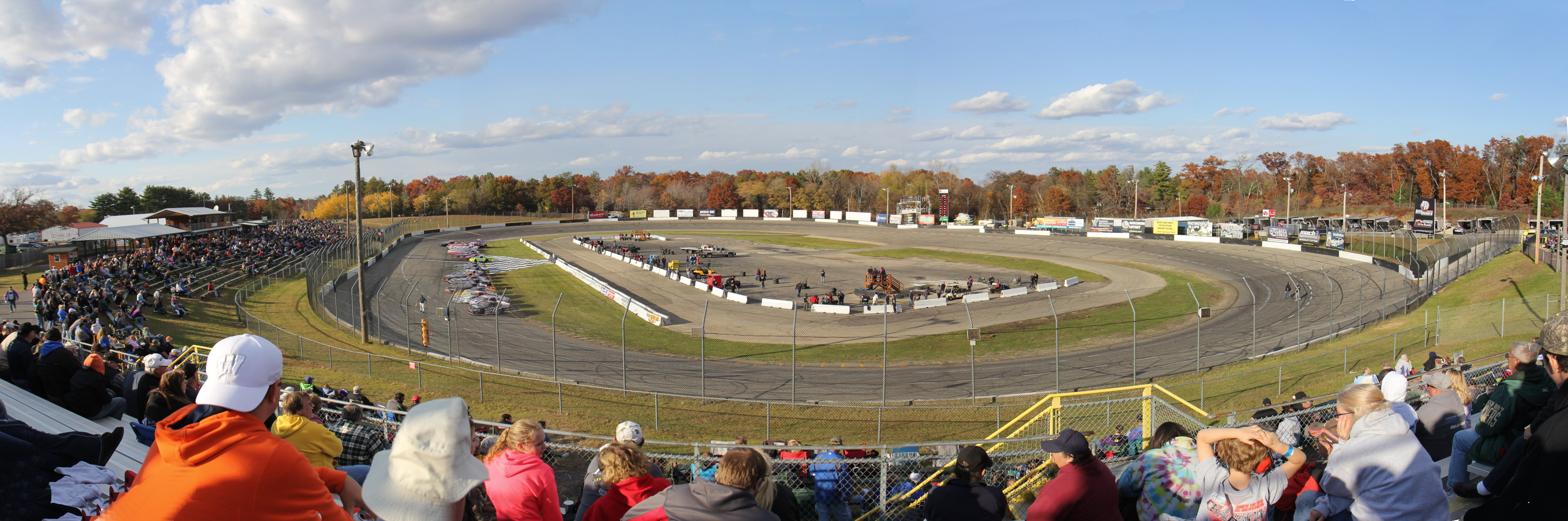
- Panorama from turn 1 in 2015 Panorama from turn 1 in 2015
- Location: N1070 Smith Rd., Wisconsin Dells, Wisconsin 53965
- Owner: Jerry Auby
- Opened: 1958
- Former names: Dells Motor Speedway
- Major events: Lyle Nabbefeldt Memorial, ARCA Midwest Tour Jim Sauter Classic 200, Icebreaker 100, Falloween 150, Dairyland 150, Badger State 125, Dick Trickle 99, National Short Track Championship

oval
- Surface: asphalt
- Length: 0.333 mi (0.536 km)
- Turns: 4
- Banking: 9 degrees (corners), 6 degrees (straights)
- Race lap record: 13.068 seconds (Michael Bilderback, Michael Bilderback Motorsports, 2025, Super Late Model)

Dells Raceway Park (DRP), formerly known as the Dells Motor Speedway, is a car racing raceway located in Wisconsin Dells, Wisconsin, in Juneau County just off of U.S. Route 12/Wisconsin Highway 16. It is a 1/3 mile asphalt track that is used for stock car racing. The track has hosted races featuring the ARTGO Challenge Series, the NASCAR AutoZone Elite Division, Midwest Series, the ARCA Midwest Tour, the Mid-American Stock Car Series, the Wisconsin Challenge Series, the Must See Racing.com Xtreme Sprint Car Series, Alive for Five Series, TUNDRA Super Late Models, and the Central Wisconsin Racing Association. The track, which opened in 1958, sits on 38 acres (150,000 m^{2}) of

The track closed during the middle of the 2006 season over a bank fraud case, but the track was purchased during the following off-season by a group of three investors led by Chicago businessman Joe Graziano, and that included one-time NASCAR driver and Dells area native Frank Kreyer. It reopened in 2007. In 2012, Graziano sold the track to Rockford, IL businessman and race car builder Wayne Lensing. Lensing divided the property and built a campground to the south of the track. The track was sold to Jerry Auby on March 26, 2021.

Howard Johnson, one of the original track owners, like to call the track "Home of the Biggies". The track has a reputation of being "what a short track should be." Dick Trickle described driving the track, "You drop low in the corners and then drift high on the straights. You try to make the track into the roundest oval possible."

In 2025, the track became a part of the NASCAR Local Racing Series Powered by O'Reilly Auto Parts, allowing drivers to participate for NASCAR's national championship.

== Track shutdown in 2006 ==
Bryan Severson, the owner of 5 County Towing in Reedsburg, bought the track from then owner Luke Herring in 2002. During the 2006 season, the track was having financial difficulties with paying the drivers, and by mid-July Severson shut down the track after his arrest on federal charges of bank fraud. Further investigation found that in 2002 and 2003, Severson had received bank loans from Mark Hardyman, the president of the First National Bank of Blanchardville, and used his towing business and Dells Raceway Park as collateral. To cover up the loans from the bank's board of directors, Severson had written several worthless checks worth millions of dollars. The bank eventually did collapse in 2003. Severson was sentenced in February 2008 to nearly 12 years in federal prison after being convicted of 28 felony counts. Severson was ordered to repay the Federal Deposit Insurance Corporation about $6.4 million that he was responsible for in the intended loss to the bank, less about $700,000 the FDIC received from another bank that bought some of Severson's loans which used the track as collateral.

== Lyle Nabbefeldt Memorial and special events ==
On May 26, 1973 Wisconsin Rapids driver Lyle Nabbefeldt lost control of his car entering turn one during time trials, crashed into the outside wall and was killed instantly. The Lyle Nabbefeldt Memorial began in 1974 as a tribute to the driver, and it became the Dells' annual marquee event until its last running in the late 1990s. The first running of the event was a 100-lap feature, but the feature format was changed the next year to running two 55-lap features with an overall champion being declared. The change was made to reflect the number 55s that Nabbefeldt ran throughout his racing career. Another unique part of the Nabbefeldt Memorial was the winner's trophy, known as the Nabbefeldt Traveling Trophy. The overall champion of the Nabbefeldt Memorial was allowed to keep the trophy until the following year's running of the race. If any one driver was able to win the Nabbefeldt Memorial three years in a row, that driver would take permanent possession of the trophy and a new one would be introduced. Dick Trickle won the event two years in a row on two occasions, but Rick Wateski is the only driver to have won the event three years in a row (1991/1992/1993). Wayne Lensing, the current owner of Dells Raceway Park, announced that The Nabbefeldt Memorial was being revived for 2015, as part of a series of CWRA Challenge Series races.

The track also announced two new marquee Super Late Model events in 2015. The first event was the Icebreaker 100, an event held in April before other tracks opened. The second event was the Falloween 150, which was held in late October after all other late model events in the state of Wisconsin had concluded.

In 2020, the Joe Shear Classic, normally held at Madison International Speedway, was held at Dells in September as a result of pandemic restrictions in Dane County that restricted Madison to one race in late August with spectators only on the hillside in vehicles. In September of 2021 the ARCA Midwest Tour stop at Dells Raceway Park became the Jim Sauter Classic, a 200-lap feature named in honor of the late veteran Necedah, Wisconsin racer.

In 2024, the National Short Track Championship, which had been held at Rockford Speedway in Illinois since 1966 until its closure and demolition after the 2023 season, was moved to Dells Raceway Park.

== Track records ==
- Super Late Model: Casey Johnson--13.047 on 5-30-26
- TUNDRA Super Late Model Series: Mike Litchfeld--13.191 on 9-25-22
- Late Model: Rich Schumann, Jr.--13.925 on 5-7-16
- Modifieds: Weston Marthaler—14.168 on 6-3-23
- Sportsman: Dave Trute--14.475 on 5-6-17
- UMA 602 Late Models: Tanner Berge--13.813 on 4-12-26
- Mid-American Stock Car Series: Brian Back--14.361 on 7-24-10
- Great Northern Sportsmen Series: Dave Trute--14.475 on 5-06-17
- Midwest Dash Series: Kyle Stark--15.334 on 9-14-24
- Pure Stock: Mark Hohl--15.444 on 9-22-12
- Super Stock: Mike Lichtfeld--14.695 on 8-09-08
- Bandit: Abe Bires--16.215 on 8-26-17
- Midwest Trucks: Jason Stark--13.904 on 10-23-21
- Outlaw Bandits: Brandon DeLacy--15.561 on 8-18-18
- Hobby Stocks: Dave Trute--15.441 on 8-1-20
- Big 8 Late Model Series: Tim Sargent--14.362 on 7-4-14
- INEX Legend Cars: Brady Fox-Rohde--15.362 on 5-13-17
- Super Trucks: Camden Murphy--13.787 on 5-16-15
- Vores Compact Touring Series: Adam Kryzkowski--15.825 on 6-6-15
- Midwest Bandoleros: Alex Hartwig--16.536 on 8-6-22
- 600 Mod Lites: John Griffin--14.998 on 7-11-15
- Midwest Pavement Midget Series Midgets: Ryan Probst--13.723 on 6-17-17

== Notable weekly drivers ==
- Tim Schendel, 2015 Super Late Model champion 2016 Super Late Model.

== Images ==
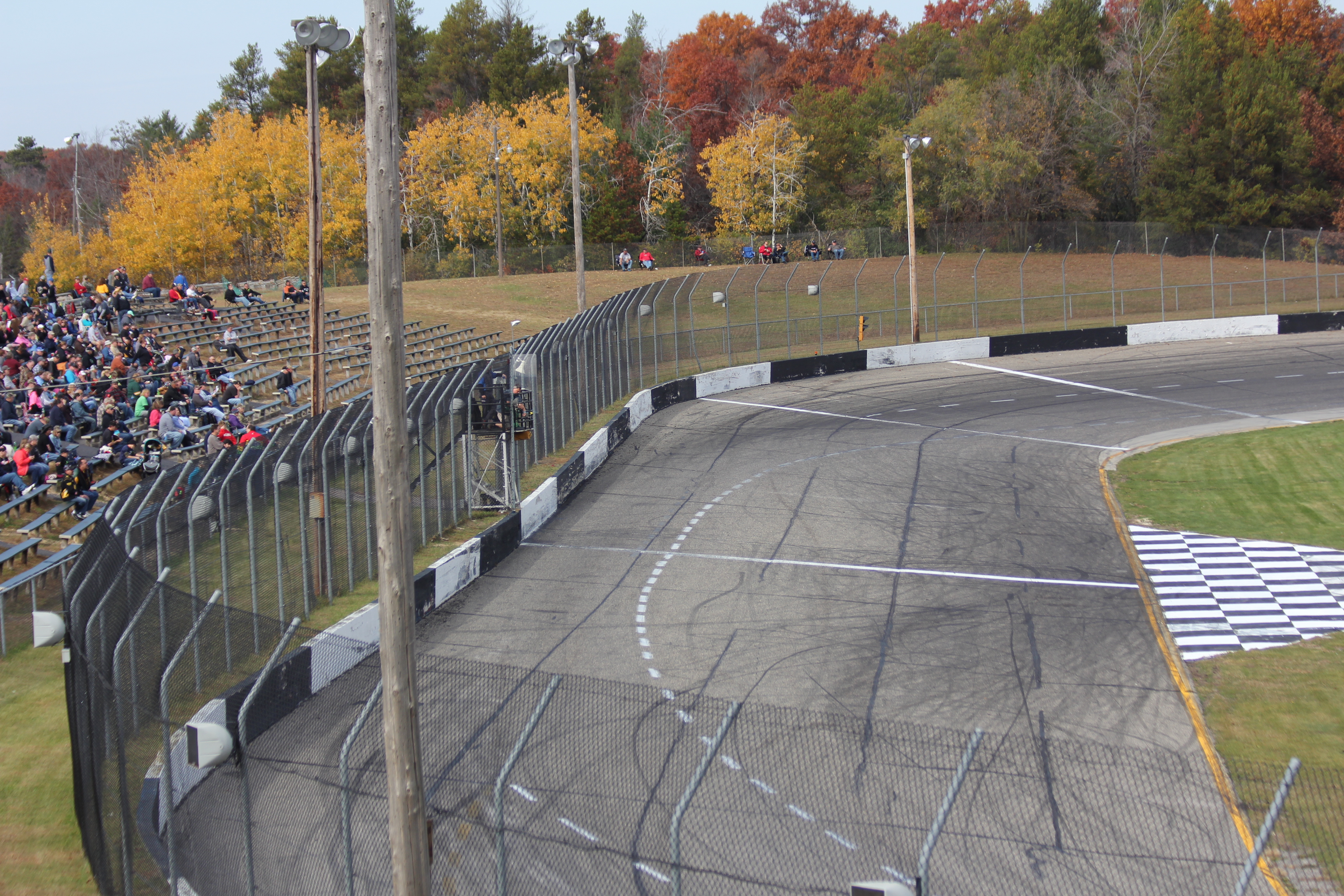
Frontstretch

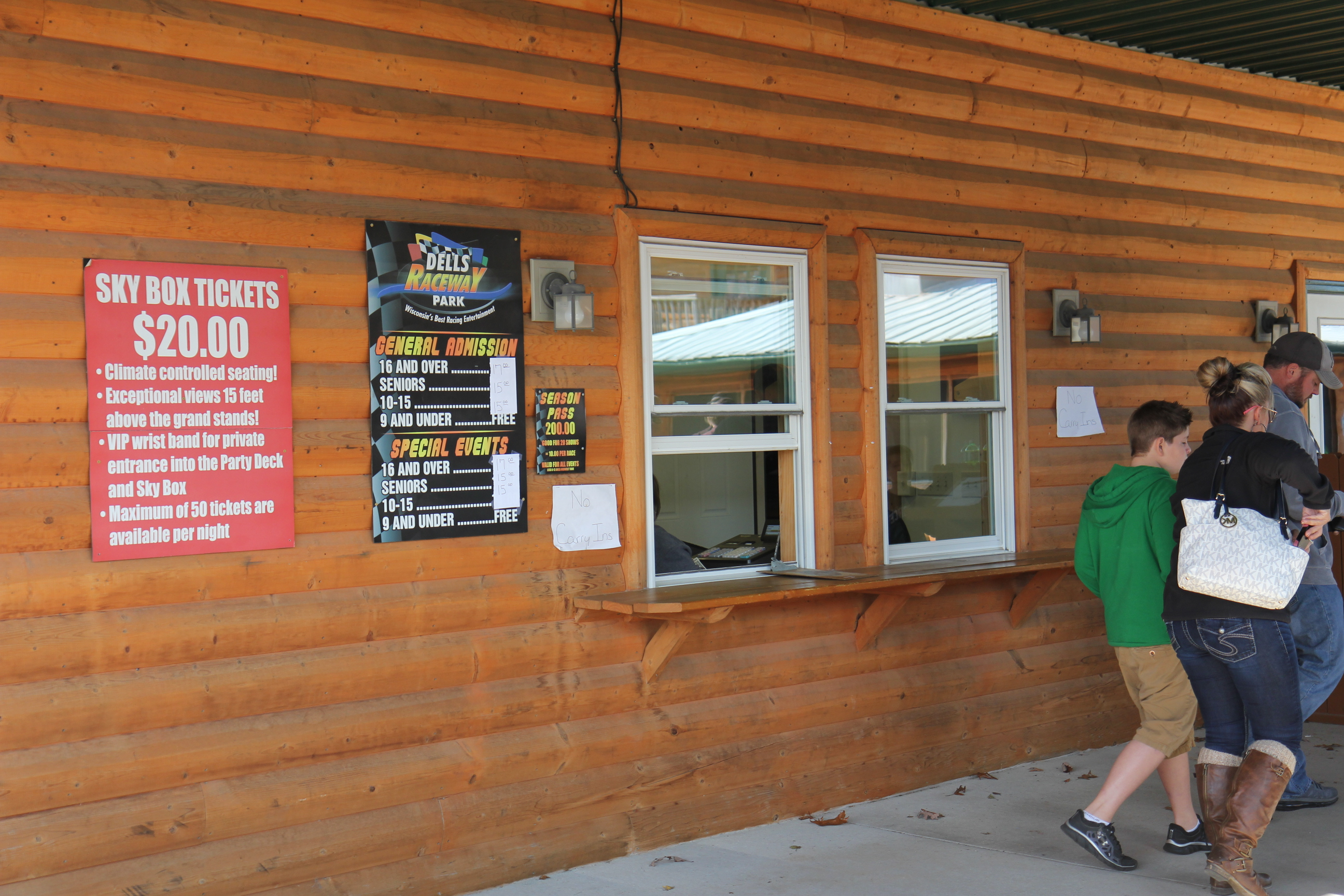
Ticket window

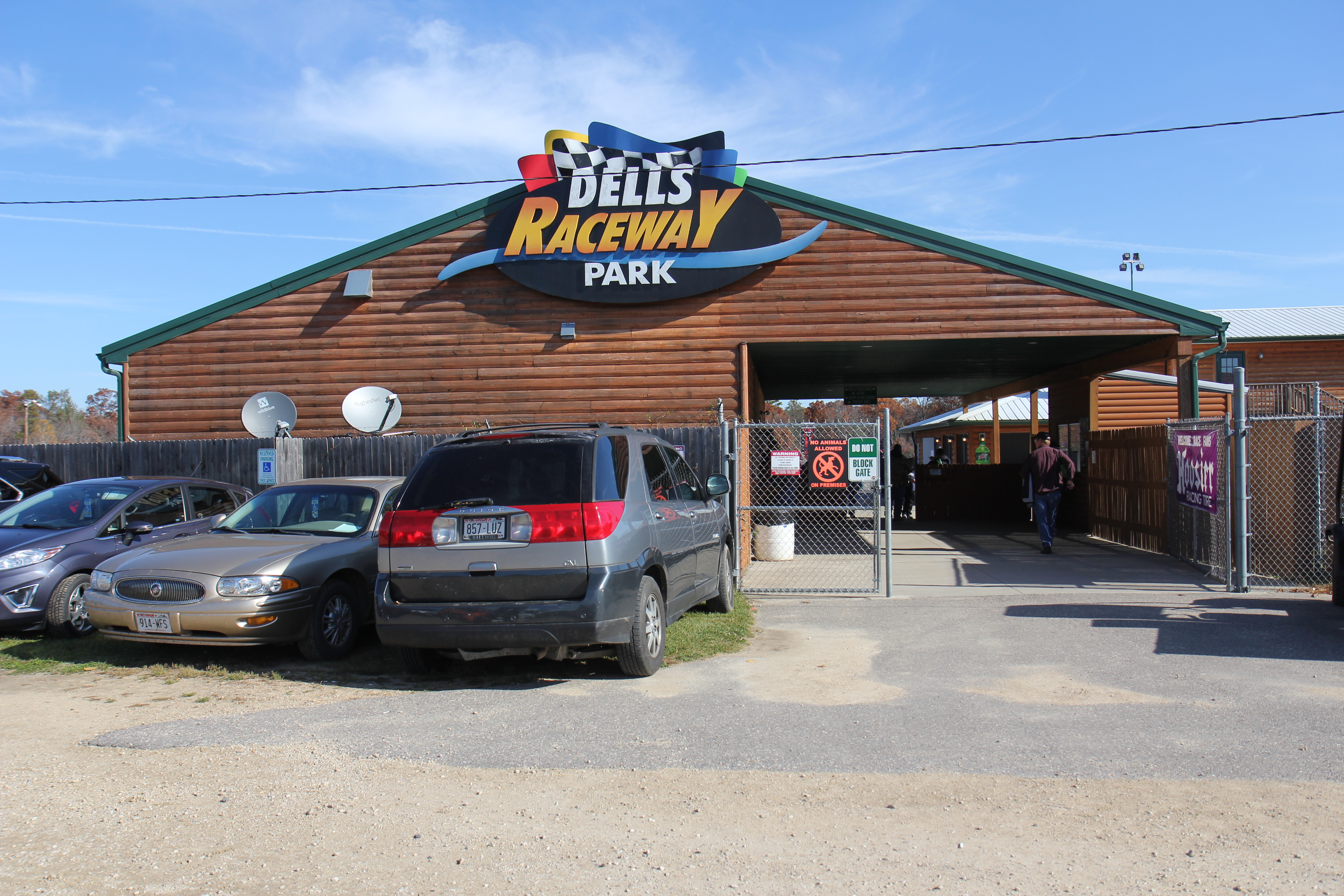
Main building

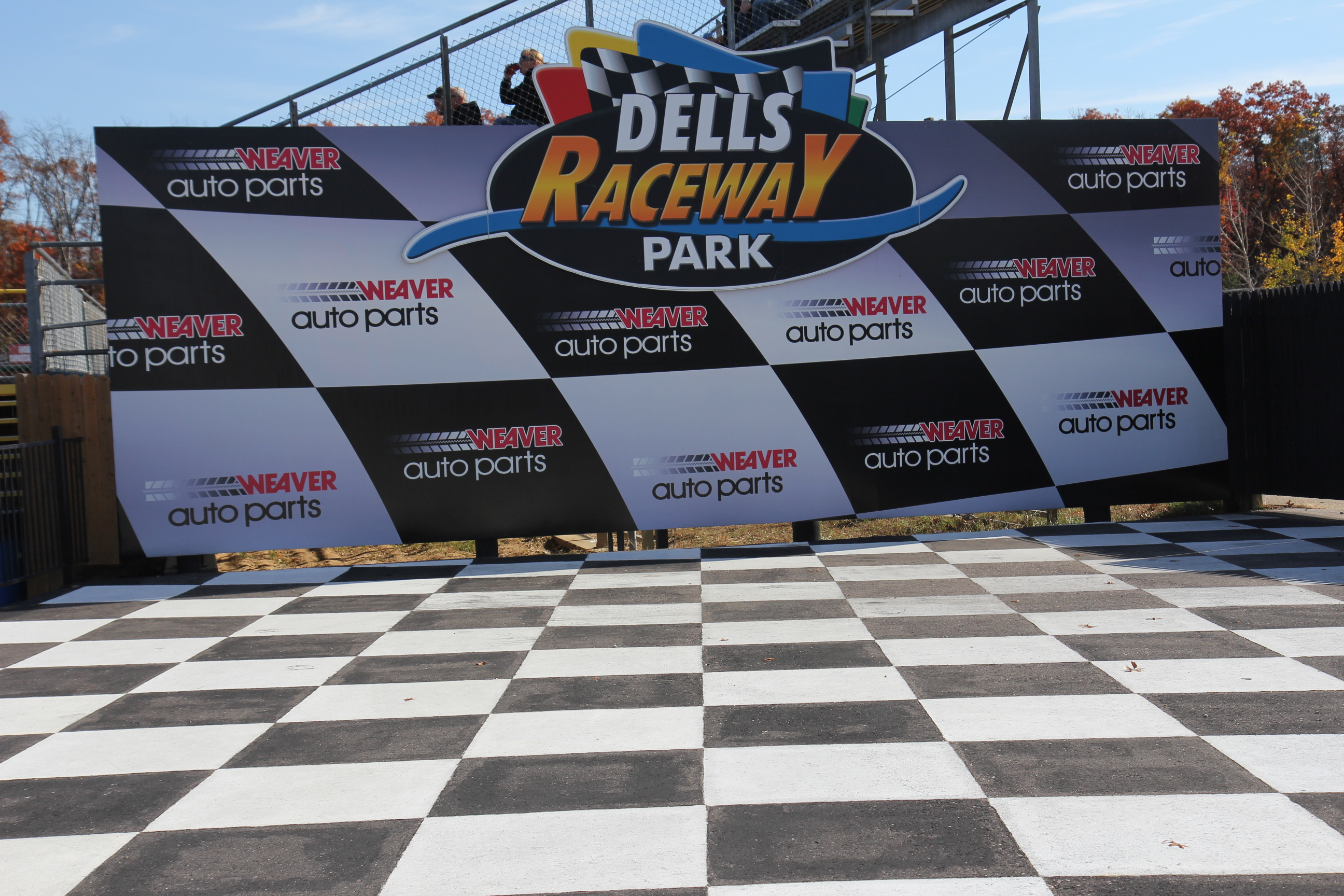
Victory Lane
