= 2014 AAA Texas 500 =

Race details
- Race 34 of 36 in the 2014 NASCAR Sprint Cup Series
- Date: November 2, 2014
- Location: Texas Motor Speedway; Fort Worth, Texas
- Course: Permanent racing facility
- Course length: 1.5 miles (2.414 km)
- Distance: 341 laps, 511.5 mi (823.179 km)
- Scheduled distance: 334 laps, 501 mi (806.281 km)
- Weather: Partly cloudy with a temperature of 71 °F (22 °C); wind out of the SSE at 14 miles per hour (23 km/h)
- Average speed: 132.239 mph (212.818 km/h)

Pole position
| Driver | Matt Kenseth | Joe Gibbs Racing |
- Time: 27.095

Most laps led
| Driver | Jimmie Johnson | Hendrick Motorsports |
- Laps: 191

Winner
| No. 48 | Jimmie Johnson | Hendrick Motorsports |

Television in the United States
- Network: ESPN & PRN
- Announcers: Allen Bestwick, Dale Jarrett and Andy Petree (Television); Doug Rice and Mark Garrow (Booth); Rob Albright (1 & 2) and Brad Gillie (3 & 4) (Turns) (Radio)
- Nielsen ratings: 2.8/6 (Final); 2.6/6 (Overnight); 4.749 Million viewers

The 2014 AAA Texas 500 was a NASCAR Sprint Cup Series stock car race held on November 2, 2014, at Texas Motor Speedway in Fort Worth, Texas. Contested over 341 laps (extended from the scheduled distance of 334 laps due to two green-white-checkered attempts), it was the 34th race of the 2014 NASCAR Sprint Cup Series season and eighth race of the Chase for the Sprint Cup. Jimmie Johnson won the race, his fourth win of the season and third straight win in the fall Texas race, while Kevin Harvick finished second. Brad Keselowski, Kyle Busch, and Jamie McMurray rounded out the top five. The top rookies of the race were Kyle Larson (7th), Justin Allgaier (20th), and Austin Dillon (21st).

== Report ==
=== Background ===
Texas Motor Speedway is a speedway located in the northernmost portion of the U.S. city of Fort Worth, Texas – the portion located in Denton County, Texas. The track measures 1.5 miles (2.4 kilometres) around and is banked 24 degrees in the turns, and is of the oval design, where the front straightaway juts outward slightly. With the ability to seat over 190,000, Texas Motor Speedway has the largest capacity for any NASCAR track after Indianapolis Motor Speedway. The track layout is similar to Atlanta Motor Speedway and Charlotte Motor Speedway (formerly Lowe's Motor Speedway). The track is owned by Speedway Motorsports, Inc., the same company that owns Atlanta and Charlotte Motor Speedways, as well as the short-track Bristol Motor Speedway.

=== Entry list ===
Forty-three drivers were entered for the race.

| No. | Driver | Team | Manufacturer |
|---|---|---|---|
| 1 | Jamie McMurray | Chip Ganassi Racing | Chevrolet |
| 2 | Brad Keselowski (PC2) (CC) | Team Penske | Ford |
| 3 | Austin Dillon (R) | Richard Childress Racing | Chevrolet |
| 4 | Kevin Harvick (CC) | Stewart–Haas Racing | Chevrolet |
| 5 | Kasey Kahne | Hendrick Motorsports | Chevrolet |
| 7 | Michael Annett (R) | Tommy Baldwin Racing | Chevrolet |
| 9 | Marcos Ambrose | Richard Petty Motorsports | Ford |
| 10 | Danica Patrick | Stewart–Haas Racing | Chevrolet |
| 11 | Denny Hamlin (CC) | Joe Gibbs Racing | Toyota |
| 13 | Casey Mears | Germain Racing | Chevrolet |
| 14 | Tony Stewart (PC3) | Stewart–Haas Racing | Chevrolet |
| 15 | Clint Bowyer | Michael Waltrip Racing | Toyota |
| 16 | Greg Biffle | Roush Fenway Racing | Ford |
| 17 | Ricky Stenhouse Jr. | Roush Fenway Racing | Ford |
| 18 | Kyle Busch | Joe Gibbs Racing | Toyota |
| 20 | Matt Kenseth (PC5) (CC) | Joe Gibbs Racing | Toyota |
| 21 | Trevor Bayne (i) | Wood Brothers Racing | Ford |
| 22 | Joey Logano (CC) | Team Penske | Ford |
| 23 | Alex Bowman (R) | BK Racing | Toyota |
| 24 | Jeff Gordon (PC6) (CC) | Hendrick Motorsports | Chevrolet |
| 26 | Cole Whitt (R) | BK Racing | Toyota |
| 27 | Paul Menard | Richard Childress Racing | Chevrolet |
| 31 | Ryan Newman (CC) | Richard Childress Racing | Chevrolet |
| 32 | Joey Gase (i) | Go FAS Racing | Ford |
| 33 | Timmy Hill | Hillman–Circle Sport | Chevrolet |
| 34 | David Ragan | Front Row Motorsports | Ford |
| 36 | Reed Sorenson | Tommy Baldwin Racing | Chevrolet |
| 38 | David Gilliland | Front Row Motorsports | Ford |
| 40 | Landon Cassill (i) | Hillman–Circle Sport | Chevrolet |
| 41 | Kurt Busch (PC4) | Stewart–Haas Racing | Chevrolet |
| 42 | Kyle Larson (R) | Chip Ganassi Racing | Chevrolet |
| 43 | Aric Almirola | Richard Petty Motorsports | Ford |
| 47 | A. J. Allmendinger | JTG Daugherty Racing | Chevrolet |
| 48 | Jimmie Johnson (PC1) | Hendrick Motorsports | Chevrolet |
| 51 | Justin Allgaier (R) | HScott Motorsports | Chevrolet |
| 55 | Brian Vickers | Michael Waltrip Racing | Toyota |
| 66 | Brett Moffitt | Identity Ventures Racing | Toyota |
| 78 | Martin Truex Jr. | Furniture Row Racing | Chevrolet |
| 83 | J. J. Yeley (i) | BK Racing | Toyota |
| 88 | Dale Earnhardt Jr. | Hendrick Motorsports | Chevrolet |
| 95 | Michael McDowell | Leavine Family Racing | Ford |
| 98 | Josh Wise | Phil Parsons Racing | Chevrolet |
| 99 | Carl Edwards (CC) | Roush Fenway Racing | Ford |
Official entry list

| Key | Meaning |
|---|---|
| (R) | Rookie |
| (i) | Ineligible for points |
| (PC#) | Past champions provisional |
| (CC) | Chase Contender |

== Practice and qualifying ==
Brian Vickers was the fastest in the first practice session with a time of 27.106 and a speed of 199.218 mph (320.610 km/h). Matt Kenseth won the pole with a time of 27.095 and a speed of 199.299 mph (320.741 km/h). “It's crazy fast,’’ Kenseth said. “It's amazing that you can go around there with that much throttle in a Cup car. It was cold outside and you get a lot of grip. We haven't qualified that good this year most of the year. All three of those laps were all I could get.” “We hit it the second round, and I missed it in the third round, my fault,’’ Tony Stewart said. “To be the first to run 200 mph average on a 1.5-mile is pretty cool.” "It was three incredible laps and a great effort by our Drive to End Hunger Chevrolet team today," Jeff Gordon said. "All day long we have had a fast race car. It's awesome to be able to be able to back that up in qualifying." Carl Edwards was the fastest in the second practice session with a time of 27.503 and a speed of 196.342 mph (315.982 km/h). Jimmie Johnson was the fastest in the final practice session with a time of 27.865 and a speed of 193.791 mph (311.876 km/h).

=== Qualifying ===
| Pos | No. | Driver | Team | Manufacturer | R1 | R2 | R3 |
|---|---|---|---|---|---|---|---|
| 1 | 20 | Matt Kenseth | Joe Gibbs Racing | Toyota | 27.158 | 27.087 | 27.095 |
| 2 | 24 | Jeff Gordon | Hendrick Motorsports | Chevrolet | 27.078 | 27.042 | 27.096 |
| 3 | 48 | Jimmie Johnson | Hendrick Motorsports | Chevrolet | 27.036 | 27.169 | 27.138 |
| 4 | 41 | Kurt Busch | Stewart–Haas Racing | Chevrolet | 27.174 | 27.173 | 27.148 |
| 5 | 4 | Kevin Harvick | Stewart–Haas Racing | Chevrolet | 27.043 | 27.055 | 27.158 |
| 6 | 14 | Tony Stewart | Stewart–Haas Racing | Chevrolet | 27.100 | 26.985 | 27.203 |
| 7 | 31 | Ryan Newman | Richard Childress Racing | Chevrolet | 27.298 | 27.034 | 27.204 |
| 8 | 78 | Martin Truex Jr. | Furniture Row Racing | Chevrolet | 27.262 | 27.172 | 27.218 |
| 9 | 18 | Kyle Busch | Joe Gibbs Racing | Toyota | 27.286 | 27.173 | 27.227 |
| 10 | 22 | Joey Logano | Team Penske | Ford | 27.069 | 27.168 | 27.263 |
| 11 | 99 | Carl Edwards | Roush Fenway Racing | Ford | 27.210 | 27.157 | 27.267 |
| 12 | 88 | Dale Earnhardt Jr. | Hendrick Motorsports | Chevrolet | 27.286 | 27.138 | 27.308 |
| 13 | 55 | Brian Vickers | Michael Waltrip Racing | Toyota | 27.196 | 27.184 | — |
| 14 | 5 | Kasey Kahne | Hendrick Motorsports | Chevrolet | 27.225 | 27.186 | — |
| 15 | 27 | Paul Menard | Richard Childress Racing | Chevrolet | 27.327 | 27.202 | — |
| 16 | 9 | Marcos Ambrose | Richard Petty Motorsports | Ford | 27.321 | 27.205 | — |
| 17 | 42 | Kyle Larson (R) | Chip Ganassi Racing | Chevrolet | 27.162 | 27.224 | — |
| 18 | 17 | Ricky Stenhouse Jr. | Roush Fenway Racing | Ford | 27.205 | 27.230 | — |
| 19 | 16 | Greg Biffle | Roush Fenway Racing | Ford | 27.197 | 27.255 | — |
| 20 | 11 | Denny Hamlin | Joe Gibbs Racing | Toyota | 27.216 | 27.304 | — |
| 21 | 1 | Jamie McMurray | Chip Ganassi Racing | Chevrolet | 27.221 | 27.307 | — |
| 22 | 43 | Aric Almirola | Richard Petty Motorsports | Ford | 27.097 | 27.345 | — |
| 23 | 47 | A. J. Allmendinger | JTG Daugherty Racing | Chevrolet | 27.295 | 27.399 | — |
| 24 | 15 | Clint Bowyer | Michael Waltrip Racing | Toyota | 27.330 | 27.452 | — |
| 25 | 21 | Trevor Bayne | Wood Brothers Racing | Ford | 27.332 | — | — |
| 26 | 2 | Brad Keselowski | Team Penske | Ford | 27.386 | — | — |
| 27 | 10 | Danica Patrick | Stewart–Haas Racing | Chevrolet | 27.436 | — | — |
| 28 | 95 | Michael McDowell | Leavine Family Racing | Ford | 27.455 | — | — |
| 29 | 3 | Austin Dillon (R) | Richard Childress Racing | Chevrolet | 27.462 | — | — |
| 30 | 51 | Justin Allgaier (R) | HScott Motorsports | Chevrolet | 27.497 | — | — |
| 31 | 38 | David Gilliland | Front Row Motorsports | Ford | 27.500 | — | — |
| 32 | 36 | Reed Sorenson | Tommy Baldwin Racing | Chevrolet | 27.553 | — | — |
| 33 | 7 | Michael Annett (R) | Tommy Baldwin Racing | Chevrolet | 27.586 | — | — |
| 34 | 40 | Landon Cassill | Hillman–Circle Sport | Chevrolet | 27.587 | — | — |
| 35 | 23 | Alex Bowman (R) | BK Racing | Toyota | 27.599 | — | — |
| 36 | 98 | Josh Wise | Phil Parsons Racing | Chevrolet | 27.621 | — | — |
| 37 | 34 | David Ragan | Front Row Motorsports | Ford | 27.629 | — | — |
| 38 | 13 | Casey Mears | Germain Racing | Chevrolet | 27.637 | — | — |
| 39 | 83 | J. J. Yeley | BK Racing | Toyota | 27.821 | — | — |
| 40 | 26 | Cole Whitt (R) | BK Racing | Toyota | 27.998 | — | — |
| 41 | 66 | Brett Moffitt | Identity Ventures Racing | Toyota | 28.013 | — | — |
| 42 | 33 | Timmy Hill | Hillman–Circle Sport | Chevrolet | 28.114 | — | — |
| 43 | 32 | Joey Gase | Go FAS Racing | Ford | 28.476 | — | — |

== Race ==
Prior to the start of the race, Danica Patrick changed transmission and started last.

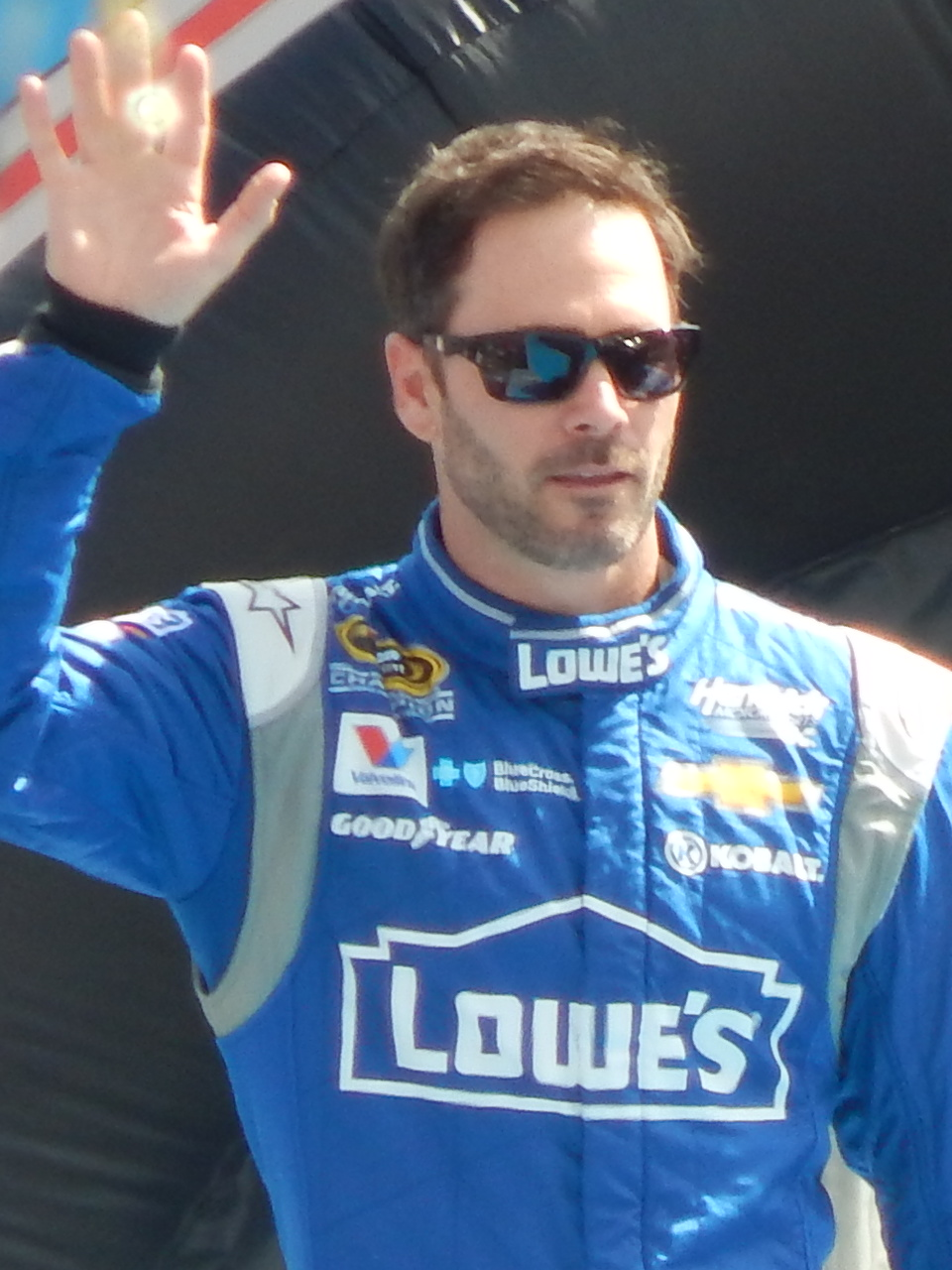
Jimmie Johnson won the race.

The race was scheduled to begin at 3:16 PM Eastern time, but started at 3:20 p.m. with Matt Kenseth leading the field to the green. During the first 30 laps of the race, Kenseth moved past Jimmie Johnson to become the all-time laps leader at Texas Motor Speedway. Danica Patrick made an unscheduled stop on lap 37 for a flat tire. The first caution of the race flew on lap 42 after Josh Wise got loose, overcorrected and hit the wall in turn 2. The race restarted on lap 47. Kenseth led the first 53 laps, but Jimmie Johnson took the lead from him on lap 54. Johnson gave up the lead on lap 92 to pit and Kevin Harvick assumed the lead. Harvick ducked onto pit road on lap 93 and the lead cycled back to Johnson. Johnson pitted on lap 138 and Jeff Gordon assumed the lead. Gordon hit pit road on lap 139 and gave the lead back to Johnson. Debris in turn 2 brought out the second caution on lap 175. Johnson and Gordon swapped the lead on pit road with Johnson pitting before the start/finish line, but he beat Gordon off pit road. The race restarted on lap 183. Earlier in the race, Matt Kenseth became the all-time laps leader at Texas. Jimmie Johnson took back that title at somewhere between lap 183 and lap 200. Kyle Busch, who had won both Truck and Nationwide Series races and was looking to sweep the weekend, hit the wall and lost a tire on lap 205 to bring out the third caution of the race. Just as during the previous pit cycle, Gordon and Johnson swapped the lead on pit road before Johnson wins the race off. The race restarted on lap 211. Jeff Gordon took the lead from Johnson on lap 217. Caution flew for the fourth time on lap 223 for a Ford grill plate that came off the front of Carl Edwards's car. Denny Hamlin took two tires when the leaders took four to take the lead. The race restarted on lap 228 and Hamlin promptly lost the lead to Jeff Gordon. Debris in turn 4 brought out the fifth caution on lap 241. Jimmie Johnson beat Jeff Gordon off pit road to take back the lead. The race restarted on lap 247. Debris from the No. 10 car of Danica Patrick brought out the sixth caution of the race on lap 252. Brad Keselowski stayed out when the leaders pitted to take the lead. The race restarted on lap 259. Jeff Gordon and Brad Keselowski swapped the lead with 69 and 68 to go. Gordon was finally able to get by Keselowksi with 59 laps to go. The seventh caution of the race came out with 50 laps to go when A. J. Allmendinger lost the car in turn 3. Jimmie Johnson took back the lead off pit road. The race restarted with 44 laps to go. Caution flew for the eighth time with 39 laps to go for a trail of debris left by Brett Moffitt. Matt Kenseth stayed out when the leaders pitted and assumed the lead. The race restarted with 32 laps to go. Kurt Busch took the lead and caution flew for the ninth time with 31 laps to go. Joey Logano cut the right-front tire and spun out in turn 2. The race restarted with 26 laps to go. Caution flew for the tenth time with 21 laps to go after Kasey Kahne got loose exiting turn 4, made contact with Marcos Ambrose and went through the grass on the front stretch. The race restarted with 17 laps to go. Jimmie Johnson took back the lead. The eleventh caution of the race flew with 15 laps to go after Trevor Bayne hooked Kasey Kahne and sent him into the backstretch wall. The race restarted with nine laps to go. Jeff Gordon took the lead. Caution flew for the twelfth time with four laps to go after Clint Bowyer got loose, overcorrected and slammed the fall on the front stretch. Gordon lost the lead on the first attempt, made contact with Brad Keselowski, spun out and brought out the 13th caution of the race. Jimmie Johnson held off Keselowski and Harvick to score his 70th career win. “It's a testament to this team and the fact that we'll never give up,” said Johnson. “We'll always keep fighting and keep trying to make our cars better. We’re not in the Chase and not where we want to be - fighting for the championship.”

== Post-race fight ==
There was a brawl on pit road involving Jeff Gordon and Brad Keselowski and Kevin Harvick. Keselowski and Harvick were parked in the post-race impound area where the cars that finished second through sixth are held for post-race inspection. Gordon pulled his car and parked it right beside Keselowski's car. He got out and had a level-headed conversation with the driver of the No. 2 Ford that seemed to make him more angry. As Keselowski was putting on his Miller Lite cap, Kevin proceeded to shove him towards Gordon and the brawl began when Gordon grabbed Keselowski's firesuit. Multiple pit crews from the three racing stables as well as Paul Menard's, Danica Patrick's and Kasey Kahne's crew were involved (Keselowski's spot in the impound area was in the pit stall of the No. 27 car). ESPN's Jamie Little was caught in the middle of it. “We’re racing for the win,” said Keselowski of the on track contact as the crowd booed loudly during the interview. “[Wasn't trying] to wreck him, just racing hard. He left a hole and you know, everything you watch in racing, you leave a hole, you’re supposed to go for it. It closed back up and we made contact. I don't want to ruin anyone’s day. I want to win the race and that was our opportunity. Just didn't come together.” “I spun the tires a little bit but I got a pretty decent start and we went down into one and I just wanted to get to the outside of the 48 [Johnson] and out of nowhere, I got slammed by the 2 and it cut my left rear tire. He's just a dipshit," Gordon said in a nationally televised interview on ESPN. "I don't know how he's ever won a championship. I'm just sick and tired of him. ... That was a huge race for us. I'm proud of Jimmie Johnson for winning that race. I didn't want that you-know-what (Keselowski) to win that race. ... (Keselowski) gets himself in this position himself and as far as I'm concerned he's got to pay the consequences. ... It's total crap. The kid is just doing stuff way over his head." “I'm not trying to sit here and sugarcoat it and try to be The Intimidator,’’ Keselowski said. “That's not what I'm trying to say. My expectation is if there's a gap, they'll go for it. If there's a gap, I'll go for it. If it closes up, there's contact, then that's racing. And that's what happened today. Will those guys race me hard or harder than others? Absolutely, I'm certain they will. But that's just part of it. I can't fault them for that. I just feel like I have to go for the gap if it's there, and I have to race the way I race or I won't even be in NASCAR. I'd rather have enemies in NASCAR than have friends and be sitting at home.’’ “If you’re going to drive like that, you better be willing to fight,’’ Harvick said he told Keselowski. “He was going to stand behind his guys. Jeff Gordon deserved to at least have a face-to-face conversation with him. I wasn’t standing up for anybody. (Keselowski) just ran over (Gordon). He was standing back behind all his guys, not wanting to defend what he did. I said, ‘You’re the problem, get in your own fight.’ ‘’ Robin Pemberton, NASCAR's senior vice president of competition, said that series officials will review what took place to determine what, if any, penalties will be issued. “Holding onto each other and grabbing... that's one thing. When punches are landed, it's a different scenario," Pemberton said.

=== Penalties ===
On Tuesday, November 4, the following penalties were handed down by NASCAR regarding the post-race brawl.

Jeremy Fuller, rear tire changer with the No. 5 team along with Dwayne Doucette and Jason Ingle, mechanics with the No. 24 team, were each fined $25,000 and suspended from NASCAR through the completion of the next six NASCAR Sprint Cup Series championship points races (returning for the Auto Club 400 at Auto Club Speedway, held on March 22). All three were found to be in violation of:

• Section 12-1: Actions detrimental to stock car racing

• Section 12-4.9: Behavioral penalty – involved in a post-race physical altercation with a driver on pit road

Dean Mozingo, mechanic with the No. 24 team and the team's hauler driver, was fined $10,000 and suspended from NASCAR through the completion of the next three NASCAR Sprint Cup Series championship points races. He was found to be in violation of:

• Section 12-1: Actions detrimental to stock car racing

• Section 12-4.9: Behavioral penalty – involved in a post-race physical altercation with another crew member on pit road

Kenny Francis, crew chief of the No. 5 team, and Alan Gustafson, crew chief of the No. 24 team, were each fined $50,000 and placed on NASCAR probation through the completion of the next six NASCAR Sprint Cup Series championship points races. They were found to be in violation of:

• Section 9-4A: Crew chief assumes responsibility for the actions of his team members

• Section 12-1: Actions detrimental to stock car racing

• Section 12-4.9: Behavioral penalty

"While the intensity and emotions are high as we continue through the final rounds of the Chase for the NASCAR Sprint Cup, the actions that we saw from several crew members Sunday following the race at Texas are unacceptable," said Robin Pemberton, NASCAR senior vice president/competition and racing development. "We reviewed the content that was available to us of the post-race incident along pit road, and identified several crew members who crossed the line with their actions, specifically punching others."

"We therefore have penalized four crew members as well as their crew chiefs, as they ultimately are responsible for members of their team per the NASCAR rulebook," Pemberton continued. "A NASCAR championship is at stake, but we can't allow behavior that crosses the line to go unchecked, particularly when it puts others in harm's way."

== Race results ==
| Pos | No. | Driver | Team | Manufacturer | Laps | Points |
|---|---|---|---|---|---|---|
| 1 | 48 | Jimmie Johnson | Hendrick Motorsports | Chevrolet | 341 | 48 |
| 2 | 4 | Kevin Harvick | Stewart–Haas Racing | Chevrolet | 341 | 43 |
| 3 | 2 | Brad Keselowski | Team Penske | Ford | 341 | 42 |
| 4 | 18 | Kyle Busch | Joe Gibbs Racing | Toyota | 341 | 40 |
| 5 | 1 | Jamie McMurray | Chip Ganassi Racing | Chevrolet | 341 | 39 |
| 6 | 88 | Dale Earnhardt Jr. | Hendrick Motorsports | Chevrolet | 341 | 38 |
| 7 | 42 | Kyle Larson (R) | Chip Ganassi Racing | Chevrolet | 341 | 37 |
| 8 | 41 | Kurt Busch | Stewart–Haas Racing | Chevrolet | 341 | 37 |
| 9 | 99 | Carl Edwards | Roush Fenway Racing | Ford | 341 | 35 |
| 10 | 11 | Denny Hamlin | Joe Gibbs Racing | Toyota | 341 | 35 |
| 11 | 14 | Tony Stewart | Stewart–Haas Racing | Chevrolet | 341 | 33 |
| 12 | 22 | Joey Logano | Team Penske | Ford | 341 | 32 |
| 13 | 16 | Greg Biffle | Roush Fenway Racing | Ford | 341 | 31 |
| 14 | 47 | A. J. Allmendinger | JTG Daugherty Racing | Chevrolet | 341 | 30 |
| 15 | 31 | Ryan Newman | Richard Childress Racing | Chevrolet | 341 | 29 |
| 16 | 55 | Brian Vickers | Michael Waltrip Racing | Toyota | 341 | 28 |
| 17 | 27 | Paul Menard | Richard Childress Racing | Chevrolet | 341 | 27 |
| 18 | 13 | Casey Mears | Germain Racing | Chevrolet | 341 | 26 |
| 19 | 78 | Martin Truex Jr. | Furniture Row Racing | Chevrolet | 341 | 25 |
| 20 | 51 | Justin Allgaier (R) | HScott Motorsports | Chevrolet | 341 | 24 |
| 21 | 3 | Austin Dillon (R) | Richard Childress Racing | Chevrolet | 341 | 23 |
| 22 | 7 | Michael Annett (R) | Tommy Baldwin Racing | Chevrolet | 341 | 22 |
| 23 | 17 | Ricky Stenhouse Jr. | Roush Fenway Racing | Ford | 341 | 21 |
| 24 | 43 | Aric Almirola | Richard Petty Motorsports | Ford | 341 | 20 |
| 25 | 20 | Matt Kenseth | Joe Gibbs Racing | Toyota | 341 | 20 |
| 26 | 26 | Cole Whitt (R) | BK Racing | Toyota | 341 | 18 |
| 27 | 9 | Marcos Ambrose | Richard Petty Motorsports | Ford | 341 | 17 |
| 28 | 15 | Clint Bowyer | Michael Waltrip Racing | Toyota | 341 | 16 |
| 29 | 24 | Jeff Gordon | Hendrick Motorsports | Chevrolet | 340 | 16 |
| 30 | 95 | Michael McDowell | Leavine Family Racing | Ford | 338 | 14 |
| 31 | 83 | J. J. Yeley | BK Racing | Toyota | 338 | 0 |
| 32 | 34 | David Ragan | Front Row Motorsports | Ford | 338 | 12 |
| 33 | 36 | Reed Sorenson | Tommy Baldwin Racing | Chevrolet | 337 | 11 |
| 34 | 38 | David Gilliland | Front Row Motorsports | Ford | 335 | 10 |
| 35 | 33 | Timmy Hill | Hillman–Circle Sport | Chevrolet | 334 | 9 |
| 36 | 10 | Danica Patrick | Stewart–Haas Racing | Chevrolet | 332 | 8 |
| 37 | 32 | Joey Gase | Go FAS Racing | Ford | 330 | 0 |
| 38 | 5 | Kasey Kahne | Hendrick Motorsports | Chevrolet | 319 | 6 |
| 39 | 21 | Trevor Bayne | Wood Brothers Racing | Ford | 318 | 0 |
| 40 | 66 | Brett Moffitt | Identity Ventures Racing | Toyota | 283 | 4 |
| 41 | 98 | Josh Wise | Phil Parsons Racing | Chevrolet | 256 | 3 |
| 42 | 23 | Alex Bowman (R) | BK Racing | Toyota | 245 | 2 |
| 43 | 40 | Landon Cassill | Hillman–Circle Sport | Chevrolet | 134 | 0 |

=== Race statistics ===
- 23 lead changes among different drivers
- 13 cautions for 61 laps
- Time of race: 3:52:05
- Jimmie Johnson won his fourth race in 2014

=== Standings after the race ===
Drivers' Championship standings

| | Pos | Driver | Points |
|---|---|---|---|
| 2 | 1 | Joey Logano | 4,072 |
| 3 | 2 | Denny Hamlin | 4,072 (-0) |
| 1 | 3 | Ryan Newman | 4,070 (-2) |
| 3 | 4 | Jeff Gordon | 4,060 (-12) |
| 1 | 5 | Matt Kenseth | 4,059 (-13) |
| | 6 | Carl Edwards | 4,059 (-13) |
| | 7 | Brad Keselowski | 4,055 (-17) |
| | 8 | Kevin Harvick | 4,054 (-18) |
| | 9 | Kyle Busch | 2,270 (-1,802) |
| 1 | 10 | Dale Earnhardt Jr. | 2,234 (-1,838) |
| 1 | 11 | Jimmie Johnson | 2,234 (-1,838) |
| 2 | 12 | A. J. Allmendinger | 2,228 (-1,844) |
| | 13 | Greg Biffle | 2,209 (-1,863) |
| 1 | 14 | Kurt Busch | 2,192 (-1,880) |
| 1 | 15 | Kasey Kahne | 2,179 (-1,893) |
| | 16 | Aric Almirola | 2,144 (-1,928) |

Manufacturers' Championship standings

| Pos | Manufacturer | Points |
|---|---|---|
| 1 | Chevrolet | 1,524 |
| 2 | Ford | 1,490 (-34) |
| 3 | Toyota | 1,365 (-159) |

- Note: Only the first sixteen positions are included for the driver standings.

| Previous race: 2014 Goody's Headache Relief Shot 500 | Sprint Cup Series; 2014 season | Next race: 2014 Quicken Loans Race for Heroes 500 |
