= 2006 Bass Pro Shops MBNA 500 =

Race details
- Race 33 of 36 in the 2006 NASCAR Nextel Cup Series
- 2006 Bass Pro Shops MBNA 500 program cover
- Date: October 29, 2006
- Location: Atlanta Motor Speedway, Hampton, Georgia
- Course: Permanent racing facility
- Course length: 1.54 miles (2.48 km)
- Distance: 325 laps, 500.5 mi (805.4 km)
- Average speed: 143.421 mph (230.814 km/h)
- Attendance: 115,000

Pole position
Driver	Matt Kenseth	Roush Racing
- Time: Owner Points

Most laps led
Driver	Tony Stewart	Joe Gibbs Racing
- Laps: 146

Winner
No. 20	Tony Stewart	Joe Gibbs Racing

Television in the United States
- Network: NBC
- Announcers: Bill Weber, Benny Parsons, Wally Dallenbach Jr.
- Nielsen ratings: 4.8/10 (Final); 4.2/8 (Overnight)

Radio in the United States
- Radio: Performance Racing Network
- Booth announcers: Mark Garrow, Doug Rice
- Turn announcers: Chuck Carland, Rob Albright

The 2006 Bass Pro Shops MBNA 500 was the thirty-third stock car race of the 2006 NASCAR Nextel Cup Series, and the seventh in the 10-round season-ending Chase for the Nextel Cup. It was held on October 29, 2006, at Atlanta Motor Speedway in Hampton, Georgia before a crowd of 115,000 people. The 325-lap race was won by Joe Gibbs Racing driver Tony Stewart after starting from the eleventh position. Jimmie Johnson finished second and Dale Earnhardt Jr. came in third.

Although Matt Kenseth was awarded the pole position after qualifying was rained out and the starting order was determined by owners' points, he was immediately passed by Kevin Harvick at the start of the race. Earnhardt became the leader on lap ten, and held it for the next 14 laps when Stewart passed him on lap 24. Earnhardt, Johnson, and Stewart assumed the lead through the various pit stop cycles and cautions waved for incidents over the course of the race. At the race's final restart on lap 315, Earnhardt led the field back up to speed, and remained the leader until Stewart moved past him on the run to turn four on the lap. Stewart maintained the first position for the last ten laps to win the event. There were nine cautions and 24 lead changes by seven drivers.

Stewart's victory was his fourth of the season, and the 28th of his career. After the race, Matt Kenseth's lead in the Drivers' Championship over Johnson was lowered to 28 points. By finishing third, Earnhardt moved from eighth to fourth. Chevrolet maintained its unchallenged lead in the Manufacturers' Championship with 257 points, 72 ahead of Ford and 80 in front of Dodge with three races left in the season.

== Background ==
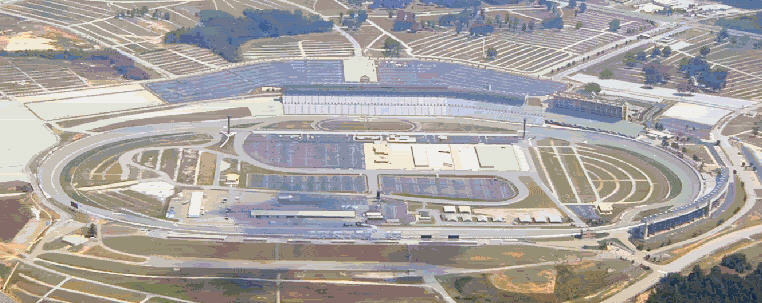
Atlanta Motor Speedway, the race track where the race was held.

The Bass Pro Shops MBNA 500 was the thirty-third of thirty-six scheduled stock car races of the 2006 NASCAR Nextel Cup Series and the seventh in the ten-race season-ending Chase for the Nextel Cup. It was held on October 29, 2006, at Atlanta Motor Speedway in Hampton, Georgia, an intermediate track that holds NASCAR-sanctioned races. The standard track at Atlanta Motor Speedway is a 1.54 mi (2.48 km) four-turn quad-oval. The track's turns are banked at twenty-four degrees, while the front stretch, the location of the finish line, and the back stretch are banked at five.

Going into the race, Matt Kenseth led the Drivers' Championship with 5,848 points; his nearest rival Kevin Harvick thirty-six points behind in second, and Jimmie Johnson was a further five points adrift in third. Denny Hamlin and Jeff Burton were separated by one point in fourth and fifth, and Dale Earnhardt Jr., Mark Martin, Kasey Kahne, Jeff Gordon and Kyle Busch rounded out the top ten drivers competing for the 2006 Chase for the Nextel Cup. In the Manufacturers' Championship, Chevrolet (with 246 points) were confirmed as champions six races prior to the Bass Pro Shops MBNA 500. Dodge was second with 185 points, and Ford were eight points behind in the battle for the position. Carl Edwards was the race's defending champion.

One driver made his debut appearance in the Nextel Cup Series at the race. Champ Car World Series driver A. J. Allmendinger replaced 1988 NASCAR Winston Cup Series champion Bill Elliott in the No. 83 Red Bull Racing Team car. This was to help him acquaint himself with stock car racing, and for preparation for the team's full-time debut at the 2007 Daytona 500. Elliott was asked by the team to vacate the seat for Allmendinger, and he decided to join R&J Racing and drive its No. 37 car. Allmendinger spoke of his excitement over the switch to NASCAR, "To race against some of the best drivers in the world in front of fans that are as enthusiastic about racing as I am is going to be a pretty big thrill.” Elsewhere, David Ragan was not cleared by the NASCAR committee to run at Atlanta Motor Speedway because of his lack of experience driving on 1 1/2 mile tracks, and Roush Racing withdrew his entry.

== Practice and qualifying ==
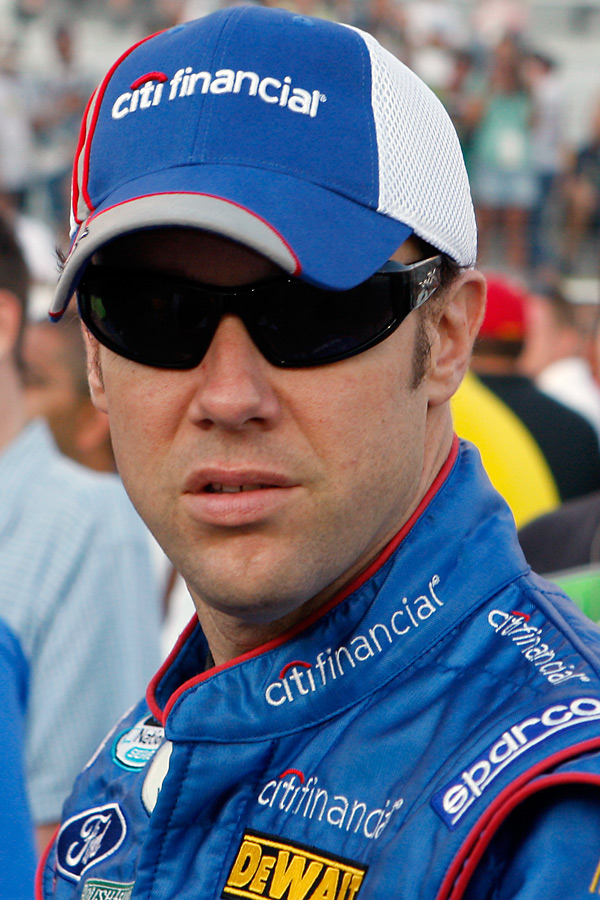
Matt Kenseth (pictured in 2009) was awarded the Pole position on Owners' Points after qualifying was cancelled due to heavy rain.

Three practice sessions were scheduled before the Sunday race: one on Friday and two on Saturday. The first session lasted 90 minutes, the second 60 minutes and the third 45 minutes. Constant heavy rain forced NASCAR officials to cancel all of Friday's scheduled activity, including that afternoon's qualifying session. Thus, the starting order for the race was determined by where the drivers were placed in the Owners Championship. This gave Kenseth the pole position. He was joined on the front row of the grid by his nearest rival Harvick. Johnson, Hamlin, Burton, Earnhardt, Martin, Kahne, Gordon and Kyle Busch completed the top ten starters. The four drivers who failed to qualify were Derrike Cope, Kirk Shelmerdine, Mike Skinner and Allmendinger due to them being outside the top 35 positions in the Owners' Championship. Kevin Lepage withdrew from the race prior to qualifying for undisclosed reasons but was later restored to the entry list. Afterward, Kenseth spoke of his happiness over being awarded the pole position, "That means I start up front, and I probably wouldn’t have been starting up there without the rain."

The first practice session was rescheduled by NASCAR to Saturday morning, and would run for an hour, while the final practice session of 45 minutes would take place as scheduled. In the first practice session, Edwards was fastest with a lap of 29.516 seconds. Kurt Busch, Martin Truex Jr., Johnson, Harvick, Greg Biffle, Kenseth, Robby Gordon, Joe Nemechek and Earnhardt occupied positions two through ten. The engines installed in Robby Gordon and Ken Schrader's cars failed, and their respective teams changed engines. Earnhardt spun on cold tyres after leaving pit road, but managed to avoid colliding against a wall beside the track. Terry Cook, substituting for Kenny Wallace who was competing in the Sam's Town 250 Busch Series race at Memphis Motorsports Park, had the No. 78 car's right-side window detach. Kahne was fastest in the final practice session with a time of 29.512 seconds; Casey Mears was second, and Earnhardt placed third. Fourth position was taken by Nemechek, Kurt Busch was fifth-quickest, and David Gilliland sixth. Biffle was seventh-fastest, Johnson eighth, Burton ninth, and David Stremme tenth.

== Race ==
Live television coverage of the race on NBC began at 2:30 p.m. Eastern Standard Time. Around the start of the race, weather conditions were clear and sunny. Bill Brannon, chaplain of Atlanta Motor Speedway, began pre-race ceremonies with an invocation. Christian rock band DecembeRadio performed the national anthem, and television host Bill Dance led a group of conservationists and representatives from Bass Pro Shops in commanding the drivers to start their engines. During the pace laps, Robby Gordon and Schrader moved to the rear of the field because they had changed their engines, and Elliott did the same for changing his car's transmission.

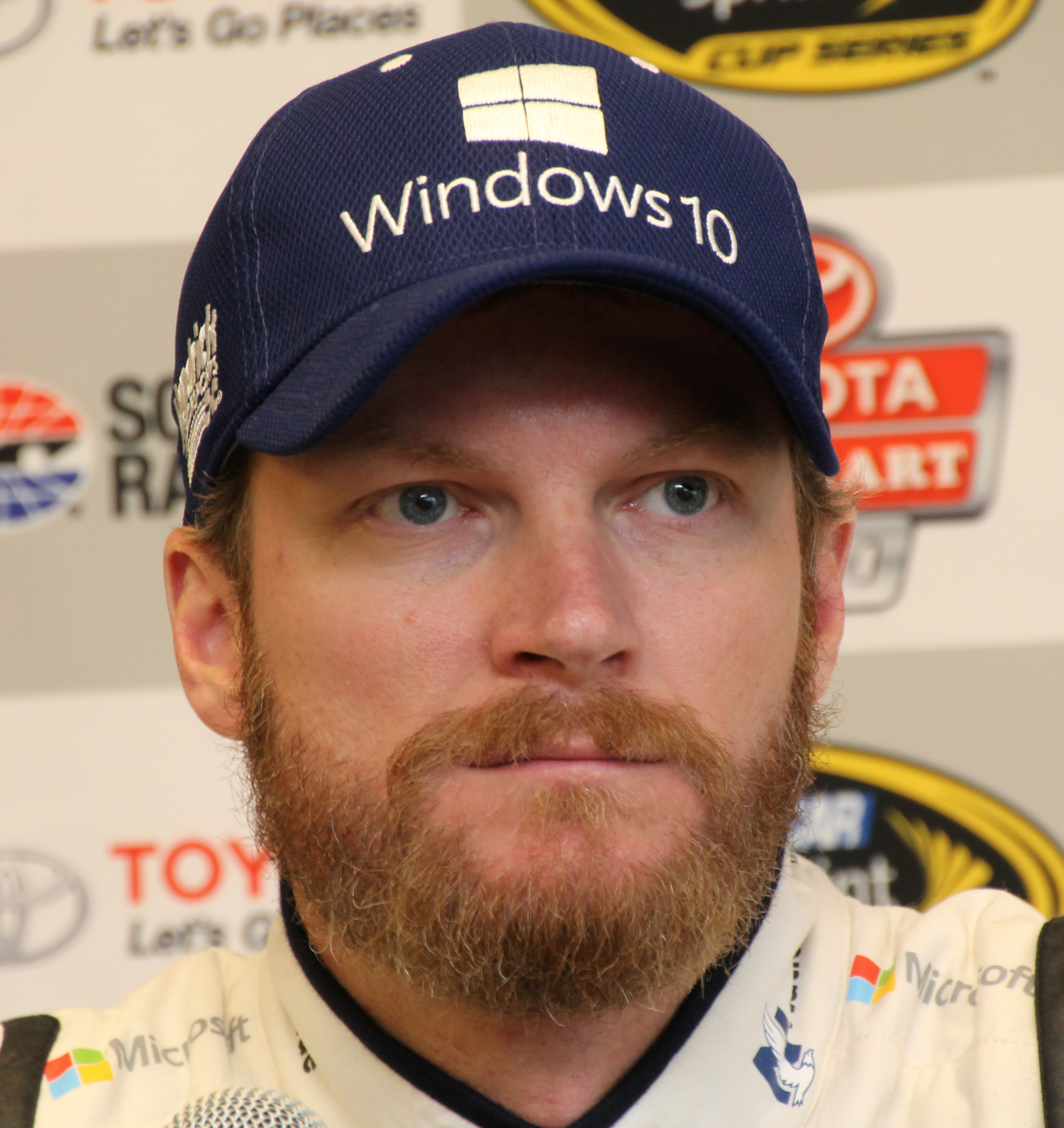
Dale Earnhardt Jr. (pictured in 2015) led a total of 95 laps for a third-place finish

The race began at 3:08 p.m. Harvick got a better start as he accelerated faster than Kenseth off the line, and got past him around the outside to lead the field on the first lap. Earnhardt moved from sixth to third by the lap three. The first caution was displayed a lap later when the eighth-placed Kyle Busch lost control of his car in the outside of the track at turn three and spun. He slid down the track, and glanced Brian Vickers' car with the front of his vehicle. None of the leading drivers made pit stops. Harvick led the back up to speed at the lap-eight restart, with Kenseth second, and Earnhardt third. Earnhardt caught Harvick, and made the pass on the outside of the track to gain the lead on the tenth lap. On lap 15, Kenseth was on the outside of the track with Jeff Gordon on the inside lane. Kenseth overtook Gordon for second on the lap. Tony Stewart overtook Harvick, Kenseth, and Gordon over the next three laps to move into second place. On the 24th lap, Stewart went past Earnhardt for first place. Earnhardt fell to fourth as Gordon and Harvick passed him on laps 25 and 30. He made an unscheduled pit stop on the 31st lap to correct a vibration that put him a lap behind the leader in 41st.

Hamlin was passed by Truex for fourth on lap 46. Three laps later, the first round of green flag pit stops began when Kahne drove to pit road earlier than scheduled to remove a coil spring from the right-rear corner of his car, and correct a vibration that was caused by a heavily worn tire. Stewart made his stop for an air pressure adjustment on lap 55, handing the lead to Gordon. His teammate Johnson led for one lap before his pit stop on the 57th lap. After the pit stops, Earnhardt gained the lead since he was on a different strategy than other drivers around him. Earnhardt led Gordon by 7.871 seconds, but this was reduced to 2.605 seconds by the time of the second caution's deployment for debris in turn two on lap 82. During the caution, all of the leaders made pit stops. At the lap-85 restart, Earnhardt held the lead with Hendrick Motorsport's Johnson and Gordon second and third. Three laps later, Johnson lost second place to Gordon. Stewart steered onto the outside of the track on the backstretch to pass Truex for fourth . Gordon caught and overtook Earnhardt for the lead on lap 109. Earnhardt retook the lead from Gordon on the same lap. Continuous side-by-side racing enabled Gordon to claim the lead from Earnhardt on the outside five laps later.

Stewart moved past Earnhardt to take over second as Burton passed Johnson to move into fourth on the 125th and 126th laps respectively. Green flag pit stops were made from laps 133 and 150, with Gordon retaking the lead, and Stewart moving into second. Stewart gained on Gordon to lower the deficit to half a second, and was close enough to affect an overtake on lap 157. Gordon attempted to lap Nemechek, but the latter had an understeer that put Gordon into a wall, pushing his right-front fender in slightly. Stewart used the incident to pass Gordon for the lead and pull away from him. On lap 170, the third caution was necessitated when Gordon had his right-rear tire go flat in turn two, and the rear of his car was rammed by Jamie McMurray, who was blinded by sunlight glare in his eyes. Gordon spun and made two pit stops to repair car damage. All drivers chose to make pit stops under caution. Stewart maintained the lead at the lap-178 but he lost it to Earnhardt on the following lap. Stewart attempted to retake the first position by drawing alongside Earnhardt on lap 187 but was unsuccessful. On lap 194, Burton was passed by Kahne for fifth. A fourth caution was given on the 197th lap when race officials located debris in turn one.

Most drivers again took the opportunity to make pit stops for fuel and tyres during the caution. Racing resumed on the 202nd lap with Stewart leading Earnhardt and Kenseth. Earnhardt had a loose car, and Johnson passed him for second six laps later. He lost a further place to Kurt Busch on lap 209. By lap 212, Gordon had moved into the top ten and got past Burton for ninth four laps later. Johnson moved in front of Kenseth to get into second on lap 218, and Kahne got ahead of Earnhardt to take over fourth on the 219th lap. Johnson closed up to Stewart over the intervening laps, and overtook him for the lead in traffic on lap 238. As Johnson increased his advantage over Stewart to a half a second. the fifth caution was waved on lap 243 when Newman crashed into a wall on the backstretch, and scattered debris on the track. Johnson maintained the lead through another pit stop cycle, and held it at the lap-248 restart. On the next lap, Kahne steered right to go up the track on the run to the first turn, and went into the path of Stremme, causing the sixth caution. Both went into the wall heavily. Johnson again led at the restart on the 255th lap. He held it for the next five laps until Stewart passed him to reclaim the position.

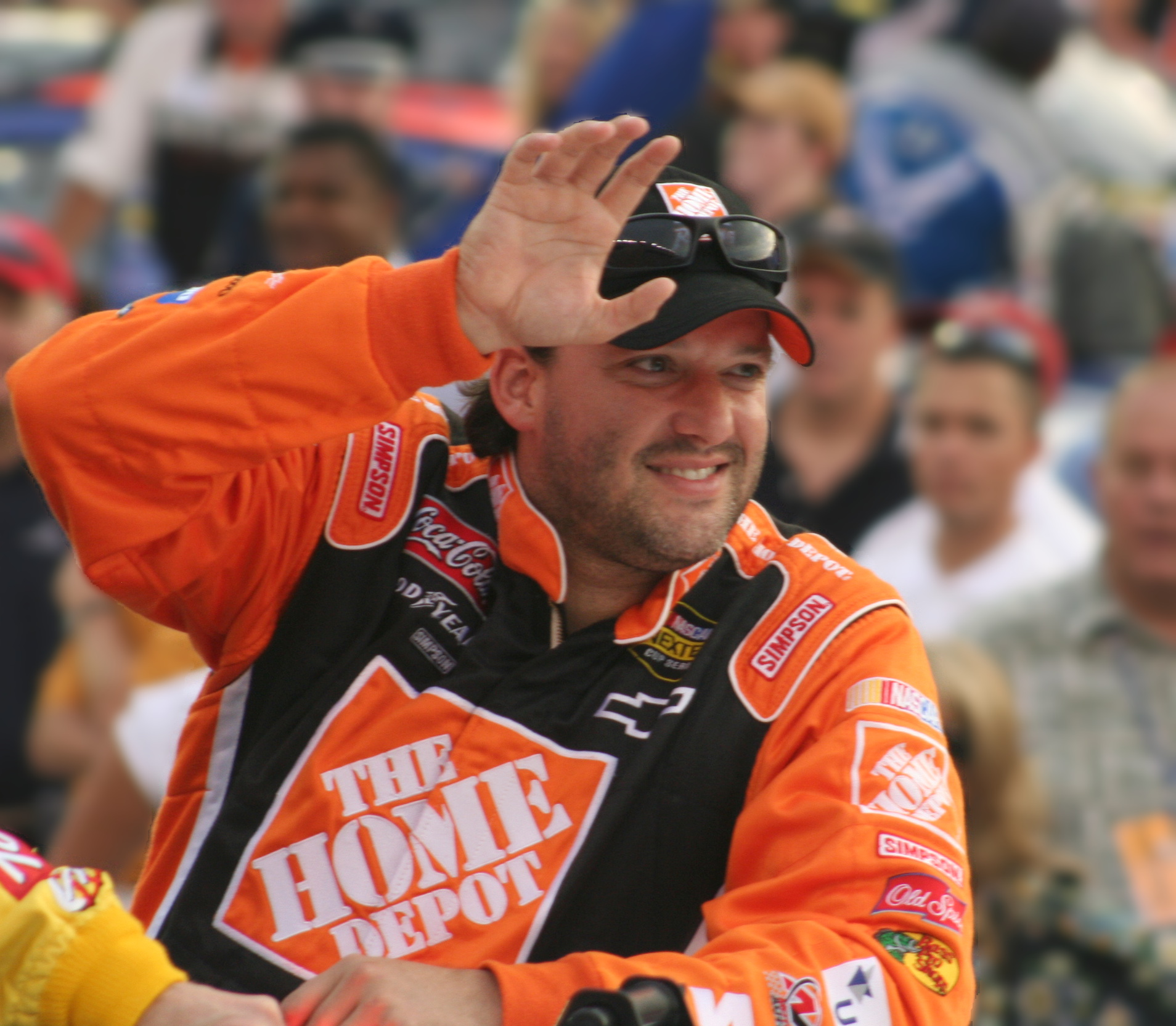
Tony Stewart (pictured in 2007) led a race-high 146 laps to clinch his fourth victory of the season.

On lap 281, Burton made a pit stop to replace a cut right-hand side tire after glancing the wall 16 laps earlier. Harvick made his own stop for tires seven laps later. The seventh caution came out on the 292nd lap after a section of foam-rubber roll-bar padding was located on the backstretch. All of the leaders decided to make pit stops under the caution. The race restarted on lap 295 with Stewart maintaining his lead over Johnson. Kenseth lost third place to Earnhardt five laps later. On lap 301, Gordon was overtaken by Biffle for fifth position. Four laps later, the front-right wheel bearing on Truex's car failed, causing him to clout the wall with the right-hand side of his car, and left fluid on the track, prompting the eighth caution. Most drivers, including Stewart, went down pit road for tires. The race resumed on lap 310, when the ninth (and final) caution was issued for a multi-car accident in turn two. Wallace drove onto the turn one apron, and made contact with Jeff Green. This caused Sterling Marlin to brake heavily; he was hit on the outside by Martin, who in turn, got rammed by Dale Jarrett. Mears and Clint Bowyer were also caught up in the accident.

Earnhardt led at the lap-315 restart, but lost the lead to Stewart heading into the fourth turn. Johnson moved into second place with overtakes on Edwards and Earnhardt over the following two laps. Kenseth lost fourth place to Edwards on the 318th lap. Bowyer drifted into a wall six laps later but no caution was given. Stewart held the lead for the remainder of the race to clinch his fourth victory of the season, and the twenty-eighth of his career. Johnson finished second, and Earnhardt repelled an late challenge by Kenseth to claim third by a margin of 0.007 seconds. Biffle took fifth, Jeff Gordon sixth, Edwards seventh, Hamlin eighth, Nemechek ninth and Robby Gordon tenth. The race had a total of nine cautions and 24 lead changes by seven drivers. Stewart led seven times for a total of 146 laps, more than any other competitor.

=== Post-race ===
"It's not as tough of a Chase. He's one of the best in the sport. I can say tonight chasing him around, I had so much fun chasing him, learning from him."

— Jimmie Johnson, speaking about Tony Stewart after the race.

Stewart appeared in victory lane in front of the crowd of 170,000 to celebrate his fourth win of the season, which earned him $373,286. Stewart was happy with the victory, saying not being in the chase helped ease the pressure placed upon him, and spoke of his feeling that he could not attained his recent successes had he been contenting for the championship, "Sometimes it gets you off your game a little bit. Sometimes it makes you be a little bit conservative. Sometimes, because of the pressure, you make mistakes. Those guys are in a totally different situation than we are. So it's easier for us to go out and just try to win races." Johnson said of his second-place finish, "We got off to a rough start, but we had the speed in the car and now we're getting the results. 'It was a fun race. You really had to challenge yourself and scare yourself on every lap. We're on a great roll right now.'' Third-placed Earnhardt stated that he was not prepared to make a pit stop during the eighth caution, "They were doing everything, swapping, and juking, and carrying on, I just kind of got left out there.''

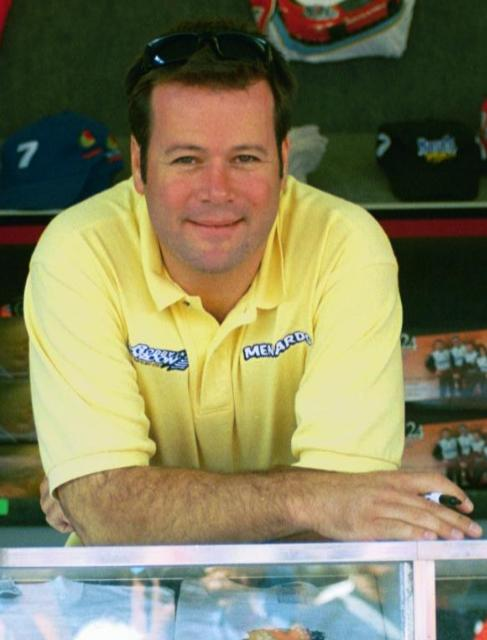
Robby Gordon (pictured in 2007) was fined and penalised points in the Owners' and Drivers' Championship for missing a roll bar in his car

Kahne had been favored to win due to his recent record of winning races at one-and-a half mile tracks, but admitted being at fault for causing the crash with Stremme, "I just drove into him. Had he kept going, it was just a matter of time until we were going to be leading. ... But, driver error. I screwed up." Hamlin, who finished eighth, had a poor-handling car that put him one lap down before regaining it with 75 laps remaining, and spoke of his fortune over avoiding the multi-car accident on lap 310, "We sucked real bad. I don't know, I can't get a grip on this race track. I haven't had and I don't know if I will in the foreseeable future. I've got to work on it." Kenseth revised his chances of winning the Drivers' Championship by half. Although he had more optimism, Kenseth said he would have felt more comfortable if his lead was larger, "At least we came close to running with them today. That feels good because other people’s troubles have kind of put us in the points lead. We had a 44th-place car on Saturday and finished fourth today, so the crew did a great job. This is how we need to run to have a shot at it."

After cutting his right-front tire on lap 268, Burton spoke of his anger with the roll bar padding that caused a caution 24 laps later. He called for NASCAR to stop all cars on pit road and penalize those lacking a roll bar, "It is starting to happen just too often and NASCAR gets on everybody when it happens. Well, they should find out who did it and penalize them.'' Television footage broadcast after the race appeared to show Robby Gordon throwing a roll bar out of his car. He protested his innocence, and NASCAR did not initially penalize him as they deemed the footage "inconclusive". Nextel Cup Series Director John Darby stated that inspectors would search all cars as they were transported into their haulers to see whether any lacked a roll bar. Later, series officials investigated Robby Gordon after an initial search discovered nothing, and gathered all information regarding the incident to come up with a conclusion. Three days after the race, it was announced that after reviewing new television footage, and re-inspecting Robby Gordon's car, the driver was fined $15,000, and penalized 50 points in the Owners and Drivers' Championship. Both Gordon and his crew chief Greg Erwin were put on probation until December 31, 2006, and Erwin received a $10,000 fine.

The result kept Kenseth in the lead of the Drivers' Championship with 6,008 points. Johnson's second-place finish advanced him to second with 5,982 points. Hamlin moved to third, while Earnhardt progressed from sixth to fourth, but was tied with fifth-placed Burton on points (5,924). Harvick's poor finish dropped him to sixth. He, Gordon, Martin, Kahne and Kyle Busch were mathematically ruled out of contention for the Drivers' Championship. In the Manufacturers' Championship, Chevrolet led with 255 points. Ford moved three points closer to Dodge in the battle for second position with three races left in the season. The race took three hours, 29 minutes and 23 seconds to complete, and the margin of victory was 1.195 seconds.

== Race results ==
Pos.	Grid	No.	Driver	Team	Manufacturer	Laps	Points
1	11	20	Tony Stewart	Joe Gibbs Racing	Chevrolet	325	190^{2}
2	3	48	Jimmie Johnson	Hendrick Motorsports	Chevrolet	325	175^{1}
3	6	8	Dale Earnhardt Jr.	Dale Earnhardt, Inc.	Chevrolet	325	170^{1}
4	1	17	Matt Kenseth	Roush Racing	Ford	325	160
5	13	16	Greg Biffle	Roush Racing	Ford	325	155
6	9	24	Jeff Gordon	Hendrick Motorsports	Chevrolet	325	155
7	12	99	Carl Edwards	Roush Racing	Ford	325	151^{1}
8	4	11	Denny Hamlin	Joe Gibbs Racing	Chevrolet	325	142
9	31	01	Joe Nemechek	Ginn Racing	Chevrolet	325	143^{1}
10	29	7	Robby Gordon	Robby Gordon Motorsports	Chevrolet	325	84^{3}
11	23	88	Dale Jarrett	Robert Yates Racing	Ford	325	130
12	20	43	Bobby Labonte	Petty Enterprises	Dodge	324	127
13	5	31	Jeff Burton	Richard Childress Racing	Cbevrolet	323	124
14	16	2	Kurt Busch	Penske Racing South	Dodge	323	121
15	25	38	David Gilliland	Robert Yates Racing	Ford	323	118
16	30	18	J. J. Yeley	Joe Gibbs Racing	Chevrolet	323	115
17	37	45	Kyle Petty	Petty Enterprises	Dodge	323	112
18	26	22	Dave Blaney	Bill Davis Racing	Dodge	323	109
19	15	25	Brian Vickers	Hendrick Motorsports	Chevrolet	323	106
20	35	14	Sterling Marlin	Ginn Racing	Chevrolet	322	103
21	34	19	Elliott Sadler	Evernham Motorsports	Dodge	322	100
22	19	10	Scott Riggs	Evernham Motorsports	Dodge	322	97
23	28	66	Jeff Green	Haas CNC Racing	Chevrolet	322	94
24	32	21	Ken Schrader	Wood Brothers Racing	Ford	322	91
25	18	07	Clint Bowyer	Richard Childress Racing	Chevrolet	322	88
26	41	49	Mike Bliss	BAM Racing	Dodge	321	85
27	10	5	Kyle Busch	Hendrick Motorsports	Chevrolet	321	82
28	14	42	Casey Mears	Chip Ganassi Racing	Dodge	321	79
29	24	41	Reed Sorenson	Chip Ganassi Racing	Dodge	321	76
30	17	12	Ryan Newman	Penske Racing South	Dodge	321	73
31	2	29	Kevin Harvick	Richard Childress Racing	Chevrolet	321	75^{1}
32	38	32	Travis Kvapil	PPI Motorsports	Chevrolet	320	67
33	39	55	Michael Waltrip	Waltrip-Jasper Racing	Dodge	319	64
34	27	96	Tony Raines	Hall of Fame Racing	Chevrolet	319	61
35	43	78	Kenny Wallace	Furniture Row Racing	Chevrolet	319	58
36	7	6	Mark Martin	Roush Racing	Ford	309	55
37	21	1	Martin Truex Jr.	Dale Earnhardt Inc.	Chevrolet	305	52
38	8	9	Kasey Kahne	Evernham Motorsports	Dodge	255	49
39	33	40	David Stremme	Chip Ganassi Racing	Dodge	246	46
40	22	26	Jamie McMurray	Roush Racing	Ford	244	43
41	36	37	Bill Elliott	R&J Racing	Dodge	146	40
42	40	4	Todd Bodine	Morgan-McClure Motorsports	Chevrolet	144	37
43	42	61	Kevin Lepage	Front Row Motorsports	Chevrolet	29	34
^{1} Includes five bonus points for leading a lap^{2} Includes ten bonus points for leading the most laps^{3} Includes a 50-point post-race penalty

== Standings after the race ==
Drivers' Championship standings
Pos	+/–	Driver	Points
1		Matt Kenseth	6,008
2	1	Jimmie Johnson	5,982 (−26)
3	1	Denny Hamlin	5,943 (−65)
4	1	Dale Earnhardt Jr.	5,924 (−84)
5		Jeff Burton	5,924 (−84)
6	4	Kevin Harvick	5,887 (−121)
7	2	Jeff Gordon	5,862 (−146)
8	1	Mark Martin	5,807 (−201)
9	1	Kasey Kahne	5,798 (−210)
10		Kyle Busch	5,759 (−249)

Manufacturers' Championship standings
Pos	+/–	Manufacturer	Points
1		Chevrolet	255
2		Dodge	189 (−66)
3		Ford	183 (−73)

- Note: Only the top ten positions are included for the driver standings. These drivers qualified for the Chase for the Nextel Cup.

Previous race: 2006 Subway 500	Nextel Cup Series; 2006 season	Next race: 2006 Dickies 500
