= Rockford Speedway =

Racetrack

Coordinates: 42.363°N 89.017°W

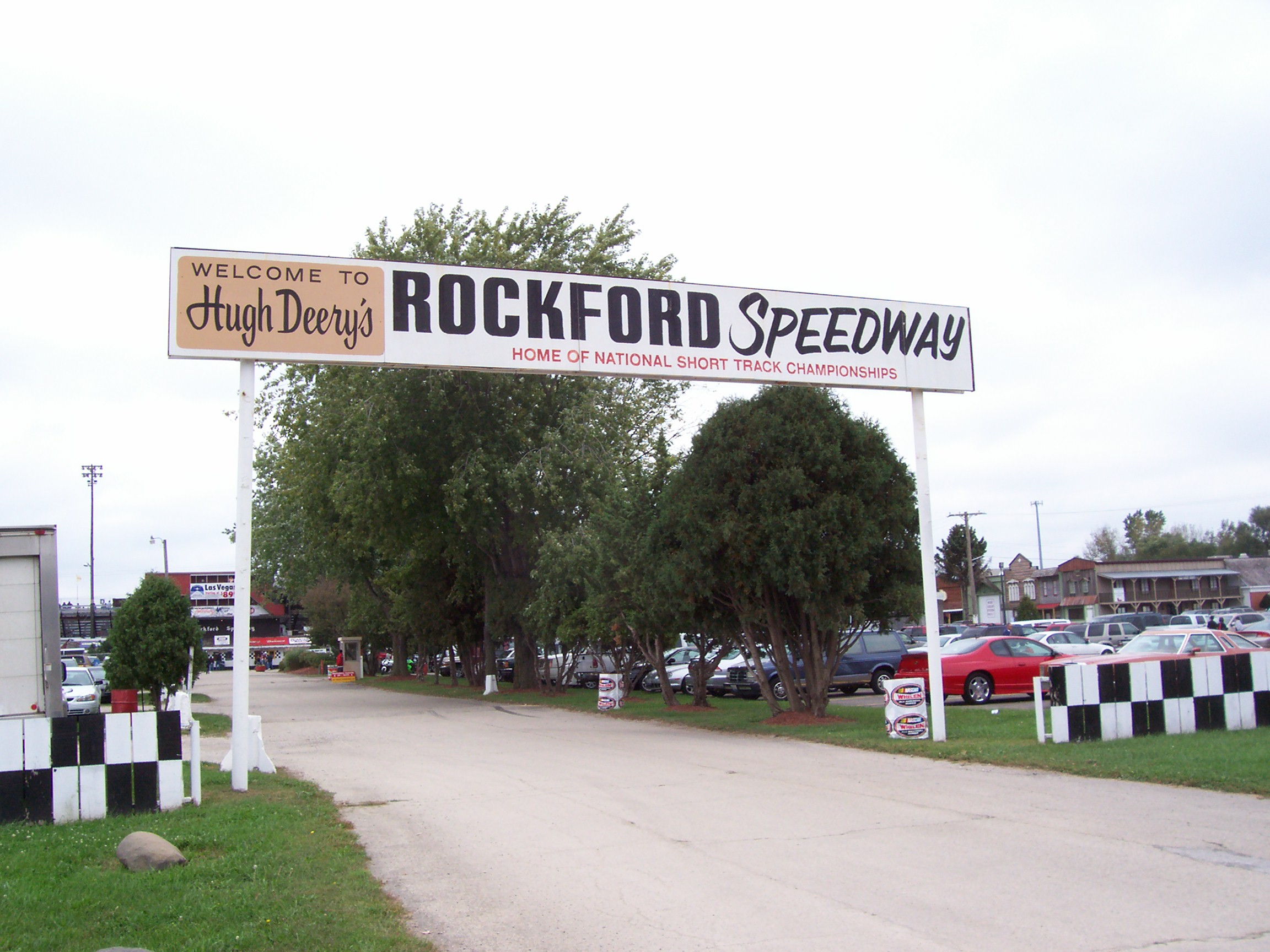
- Location: Illinois Route 173, Loves Park, Illinois
- Owner: Deery family
- Operator: Deery family
- Opened: 1948
- Closed: 2023

1/4 mile oval
- Surface: Asphalt
- Length: 0.249 mi (0.400 km)
- Banking: 22°

Rockford Speedway was a 1/4 mile short track high banked asphalt oval located in Loves Park, Illinois on Illinois Route 173. Up until its demolition in 2023, Rockford Speedway, Chicagoland Speedway, and World Wide Technology Raceway at Gateway were the only racetracks running under NASCAR sanctions in Illinois.

It hosted weekly local-level events during the summer racing season as well as occasional regional- and national-level events. Notable special events at the track included trailer races, endurance races, the Spring Classic, ALl-Star 100, Bahama Bracket Nationals, and the National Short Track Championship.

== History ==
The track was built in 1947 by a Stanley Ralston and 6 other investors. Hugh Deery eventually bought into the speedway and was the sole owner by 1966. It was run by his widow, Jody Deery until her death in 2022, at which time David Deery took over management of the track. It opened in 1948 as a midget car racing venue. Despite a death in the pits at the speedway several weeks after opening, on June 16, 1948, the track continued operation. Rockford Speedway is known for being the first track to develop an economical late model program as well as being an early adopter of the short track Saturday night racing program. Another one of Hugh Deery's innovations was to host a season-ending special event (which he titled the National Short Track Championship). He was inducted in the Illinois Stock Car Hall of Fame in 2013. Jody Deery was one of a handful of track operators on the 22-person nominating committee for the NASCAR Hall of Fame.

Over the years the track has also hosted concerts. On August 17, 1980, as a part of 'Rockford Speedway Jam 1980', Black Sabbath performed at the speedway as a part of their Heaven & Hell Tour.

The property was sold and redeveloped after the 2023 racing season.

== Track ==
The track was an asphalt-paved nominal 1/4 mile. The measured length of the track was 0.29167 miles (0.46940 km). It was highly banked at the turns and relatively flat on the front and back stretches. It was banked at 22 degrees in the 50-foot (15 m)-wide corners and eight degrees in the 40-foot (12 m)-wide straightaways. Inside the 1/4 mile oval track is a figure eight track.

== Programs ==
=== Weekly programs ===
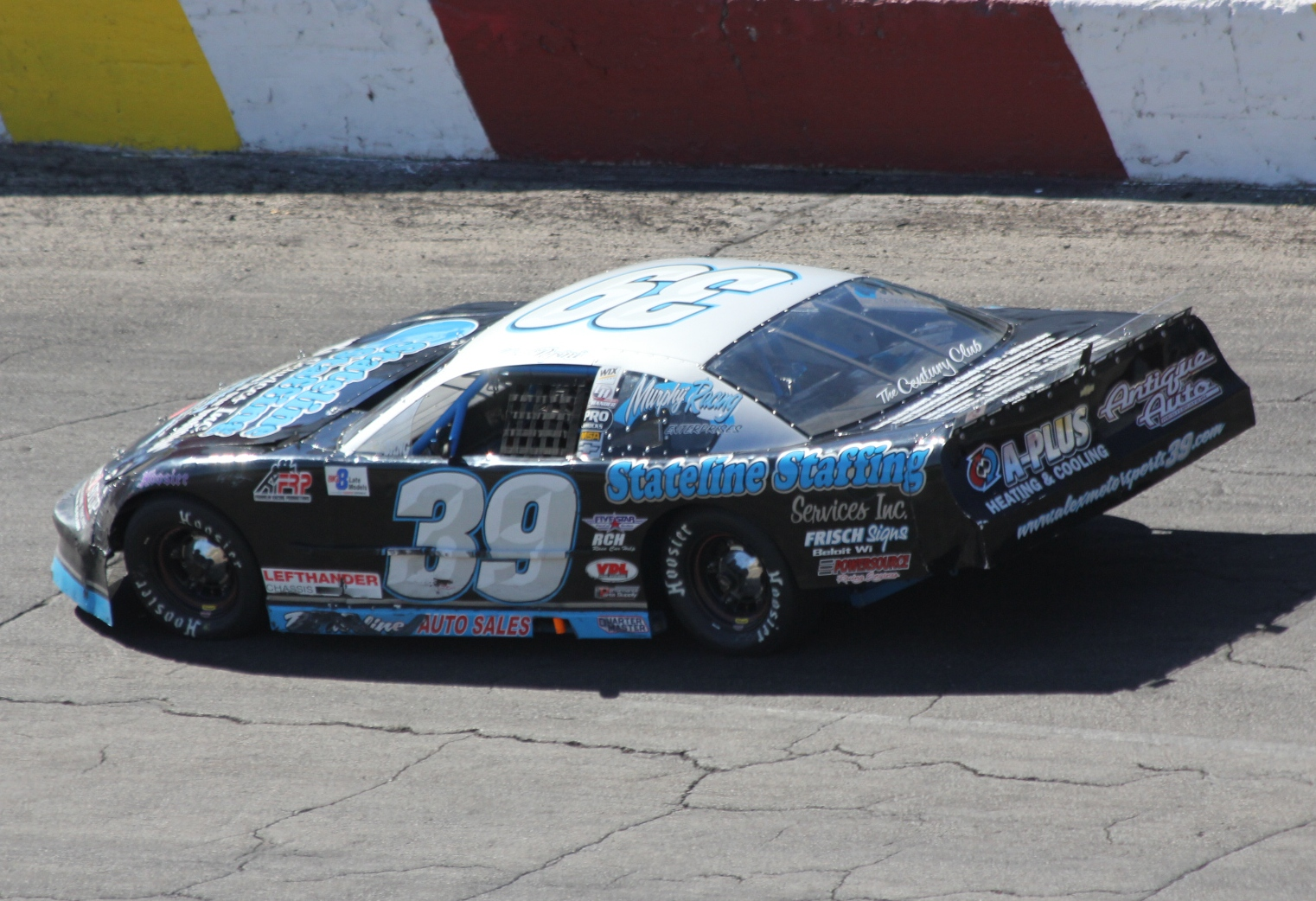
2013 track champion Alex Papini

The track offered two weekly programs during much of the season. On Saturdays it hosted a NASCAR-sanctioned Whelen All-American Series late model race, along with All American Sportsmen, American Short Trackers and Road Runners. On Wednesday nights it hosted The Road Runner Super Summer Series, Bandits, Winged Women on wheels, Figure 8's, Legends, Minicups, Bandoleros, and spectacular drags.

==== Notable racers and participants ====
Track champions include seven-time champions Bobby Wilberg (1991, 1995 - 2000) and John Knaus, with Joe Shear Sr, (1967–1972) winning six titles. Both Knaus' son Chad and Shear's son Joe Jr. are NASCAR national series championship winning crew chiefs. Travis Kvapil started racing at Rockford at age 16 and was the 1994 track champion in the American Short Tracker division. Rich Bickle was the track's sportsman rookie of the year in 1980.

Several notable people started their racing careers at Rockford. NASCAR crew chief Chad Knaus was his father's crew chief for his championship race car. NASCAR Sprint Cup Series official John Darby got his start at Rockford in 1971 as an owner of a street stock. In 1976 he became crew chief for a late model that he owned which won the 1977 championship. He stopped owning the racecar in 1982 and became a track official. He moved up the NASCAR ranks as a technical official, and by 1994 he was the director for the NASCAR Busch Series (now Xfinity Series). After three years he was named the NASCAR's Sprint Cup Series director of competition.

=== Special events ===
Rockford Speedway hosted two ARCA Racing Series events between 1987 and 1988.

The track held events in the ARCA Midwest Tour Series, Must-See Xtemem Sprint Car Series, Mid American Stock Car Series events, Big 8 Limited Late Model Touring Series, Midwest Dash 4 cylinder touring series, monster trucks, and enduros. Series that held races at the track include: NASCAR Midwest Series, the Wisconsin Challenge Series, ASA Late Model Series Northern Division, and USAC National Midgets.

In 2016 the speedway hosted the World of Outlaws sprint cars and late models in an event called the Outlaw Clay Classic. The track was covered in clay for the first time in the track's history for two nights and racing was held on the track's temporary surface.

==== National Short Track Championship ====
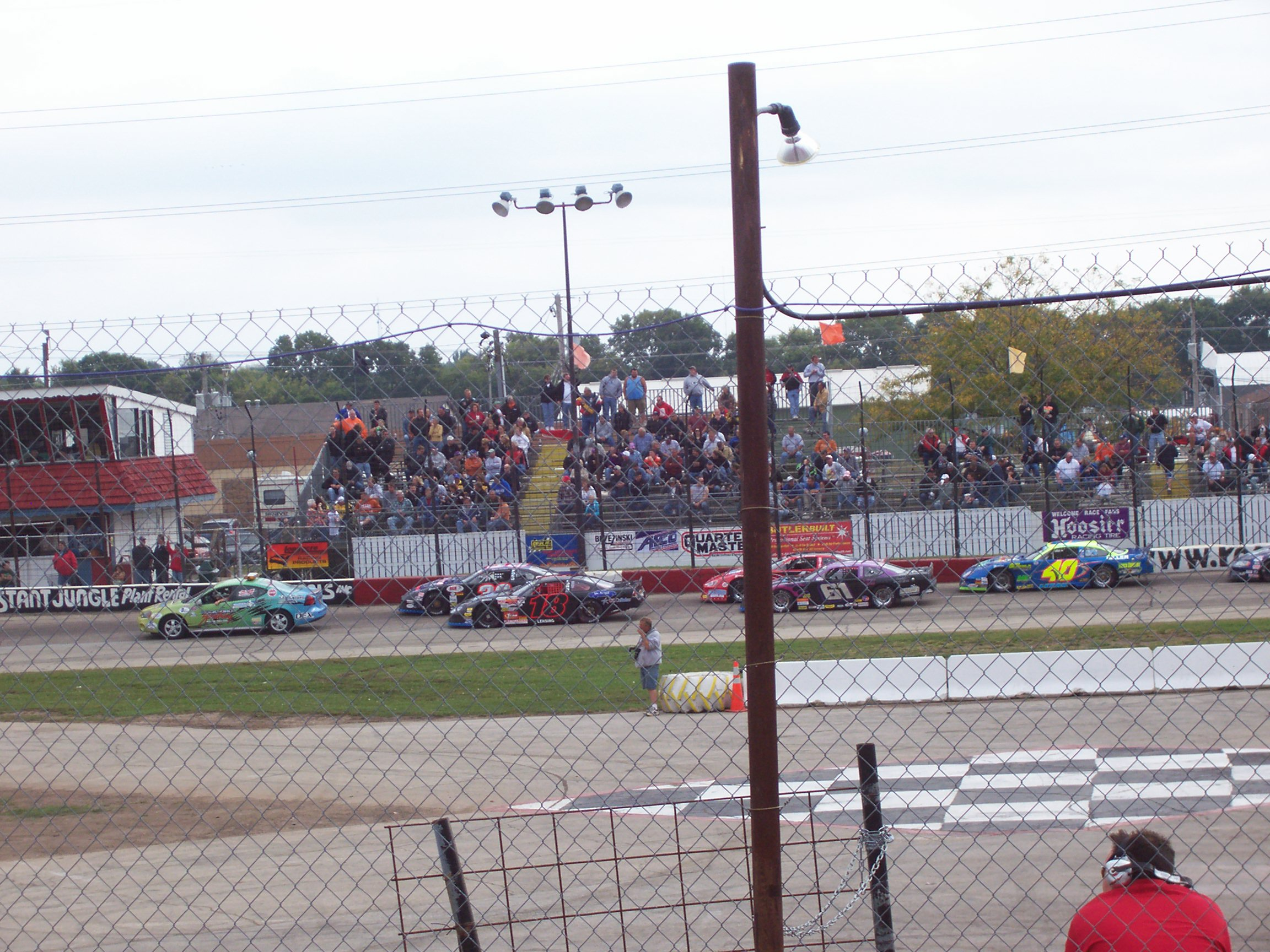
2008 field

The National Short Track Championship (NSTC), first held in 1966, is usually was held in late September or early October, but has now become a mid-September date since the move to Wisconsin. The three day event usually has multiple divisions (in 2025 it is 11) racing. Track promoters decided to host the first 200 lap event in late 1966 to pit the best drivers in Chicagoland against the best drivers in the Central Wisconsin Drivers Association. Drivers competing at the event are primarily from Illinois and Wisconsin, although drivers from other states often participate. Winners have come as west as Colorado and as east as Ontario, with NASCAR Hall of Fame inductee Mark Martin among the list of winners. The event was sanctioned by ARTGO for several years, and it became part of the CRA Super Series tour in 2004. In 2005, it was part of the ASA Late Model Series. It was not part of any tour for several years until the ASA Midwest Tour took over in 2011. From 2013 until 2020 there was no sanctioning body for the Super Late Models running at the event. Starting in 2021, the feature division changed from Super Late Models to the region-based Big 8 Late Model Series (which use the same offset chassis, but restricted brakes, suspension, and engines) as the featured division, although Super Late Models (which have a standard set from the United Super Late Model Rules Alliance for major races such as ASA Stars and the Snowball Derby) were also a division. 16 drivers were invited to compete in a pair of 45 lap features at the Rich Bickle Super Late Model Invitational in 2021. This was being dedicated to Rich Bickle, who was retiring from racing at the end of the 2021 season. In 2022 the Super Late Models ran 48 lap and 49 lap features as part of the Jody Deery Super Late Model Invitational. This was being dedicated to Jody Deery, the longtime owner who died in July at the age of 97. The Jody Deery Super Late Model Invitational was expanded in 2023 to a 147 lap feature event with a break after 97 laps. The Big 8 Late Model Series ran a 188 lap feature in 2021 and 2022 as the main event to crown the overall event champion. For the 58th running of the event in 2023, the main event was a 158 lap feature for the Big 8 Late Model Series .

On December 22, 2023, the Deery family announced the race will continue at a new home, Dells Raceway Park in Lyndon, Juneau County, Wisconsin. The 59th edition was held in September, and reverted to 150 laps. The feature Super Late Model race is named the Hugh Deery 150 in honor of the family. It remains a three-day race with multiple divisions.

The 60th edition in 2025 will revert to 100 laps for Super Late Models as a non-championship race on Dells Raceway Park's "Alive for 5" series as part of a track wide effort to save teams money by eliminating fuel stops and tire changes for the major features, where costs have risen in pit stops because of highly trained pit crews in national series. Some divisions will be NASCAR sanctioned.

===== Winners =====
Joe Shear was the first driver to win eight NSTC Super Late Model features (currently the "Hugh Deery 100") and Steve Carlson tied his record in 2011. Other multiple winners include Jeremy Lepak, Dick Trickle, and Eddie Hoffman.

The first event was won by Wisconsin short track racer Trickle by a lap over Chicagoland stock-car champion Roy Martinelli. Trickle was billed as the winningest short track driver in history with estimates of his win total between 1,000 and 1,200 races. Years later, Trickle commented, "I really do treasure that one in 1966. There were a lot of behind-the-scenes things that went on there. Number one, I had never run outside my own backyard, you might say, which is the central Wisconsin area. I never ran somewhere except in my own little circuit, but I had won there. The first time I ever stepped out of the central Wisconsin area was to the Rockford Nationals in 1966."

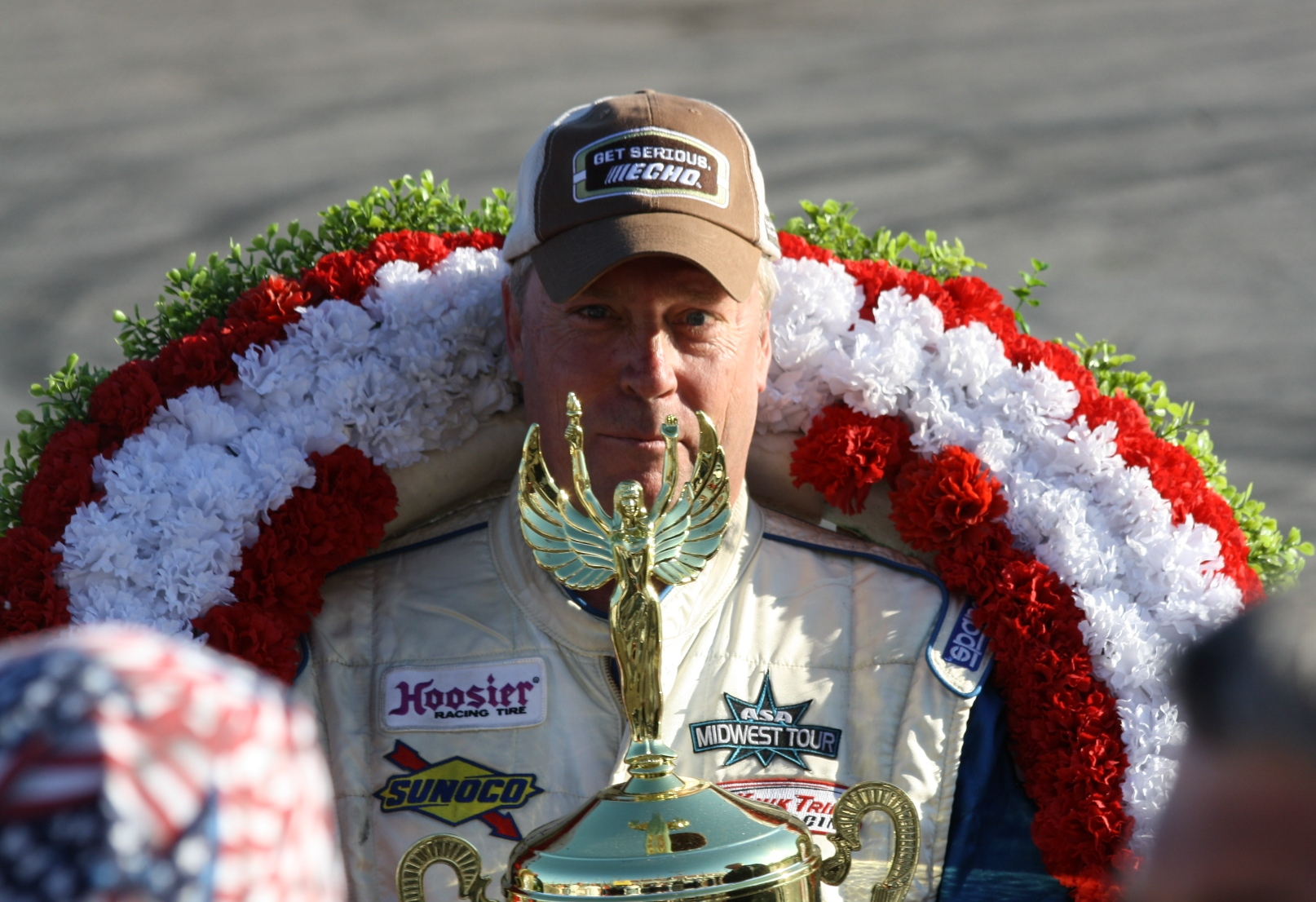
Steve Carlson after winning the 2011 race, his eighth

Wisconsin Dells
Year	Winner
2026	Nick Nolden
2025	Ty Fredrickson
2024	Ryan Farrell
Rockford
2023	Jeremy Miller
2022	Austin Nason
2021	Austin Nason
2020	Max Kahler
2019	Casey Johnson
2018	Alex Prunty
2017	Alex Prunty
2016	Casey Johnson
2015	Jon Reynolds Jr.
2014	Steve Rubeck
2013	Eddie Hoffman
2012	Rich Bickle
2011	Steve Carlson
2010	Brett Sontag
2009	Josh Nelms
2008	Josh Vadnais
2007	Jeremy Lepak
2006	Jeremy Lepak
2005	Eddie Hoffman
2004	Eddie Hoffman
2003	Ron Breese Jr.
2002	Steve Rubeck
2001	Eddie Hoffman
2000	Steve Carlson
1999	Steve Carlson
1998	Steve Carlson
1997	Joe Shear
1996	Steve Carlson
1995	Steve Carlson
1994	Scott Hansen
1993	Steve Carlson
1992	Steve Carlson
1991	Butch Miller
1990	Rich Bickle
1989	Tim Fedewa
1988	John Ziegler
1987	Joe Shear
1986	Mike Alexander
1985	Joe Shear
1984	Al Schill Sr.
1983	Joe Shear
1982	Joe Shear
1981	Junior Hanley
1980	Jim Sauter
1979	Dick Trickle
1978	Dick Trickle
1977	Mark Martin
1976	Dave Watson
1975	Joe Shear
1974	Joe Shear
1973	Mike Miller
1972	Joe Shear
1971	Bill Retallick
1970	Wayne Stallsworth
1969	Ramo Stott
1968	William "Whitey" Gerken
1967	Marlin "Shoes" Walbeck
1966	Dick Trickle

== Late Model Track Champions ==
- 1948: Tony Bettenhausen
- 1949: Jim Rathmann
- 1950: Pat Flaherty
- 1951: Al Shear
- 1952: Tom Pistone
- 1953: Tom Pistone
- 1954: Al Shear
- 1955: Don Harvey
- 1956: Red Aase
- 1957: Red Aase
- 1958: Bobby Udel
- 1959: Jim Birks
- 1960: Don Harvey
- 1961: Don Harvey
- 1962: Al Shear
- 1963: Red Aase
- 1964: Bob Chapman
- 1965: Gene Marmour
- 1966: Whitney Gerken
- 1967: Joe Shear
- 1968: Joe Shear
- 1969: Joe Shear
- 1970: Joe Shear
- 1971: Joe Shear
- 1972: Joe Shear
- 1973: Dave Watson
- 1974: Jerry Lewis
- 1975: Dennis Burgan
- 1976: Wayne Lensing
- 1977: Don Leach
- 1978: Don Leach
- 1979: Wayne Lensing
- 1980: Wayne Lensing
- 1981: John Luther
- 1982: John Luther
- 1983: Dave Fossum
- 1984: Bob Hacker
- 1985: Jim Pierson
- 1986: Bob Hacker
- 1987: John Knaus
- 1988: John Knaus
- 1989: John Knaus
- 1990: John Knaus
- 1991: Bobby Wilberg
- 1992: John Knaus
- 1993: John Knaus
- 1994: John Knaus
- 1995: Bobby Wilberg
- 1996: Bobby Wilberg
- 1997: Bobby Wilberg
- 1998: Bobby Wilberg
- 1999: Bobby Wilberg
- 2000: Bobby Wilberg
- 2001: Ricky Bilderback
- 2002: Ricky Bilderback
- 2003: Ricky Bilderback
- 2004: Ricky Bilderback
- 2005: Ricky Bilderback
- 2006: Ricky Bilderback
- 2007: Ricky Bilderback
- 2008: Jerry Gille
- 2009: Jerry Gille
- 2010: Tim Sargent
- 2011: Ryan Carlson
- 2012: Jerry Gille
- 2013: Alex Papini
- 2014: Jon Reynolds Jr
- 2015: Jake Gille
- 2016: Michael Bilderback
- 2017: Michael Bilderback
- 2018: Jon Reynolds Jr
- 2019: Michael Bilderback
- 2020: Jon Reynolds Jr
- 2021: Jon Reynolds Jr
- 2022: Jake Gille
- 2023: Jon Reynolds Jr

== Images ==
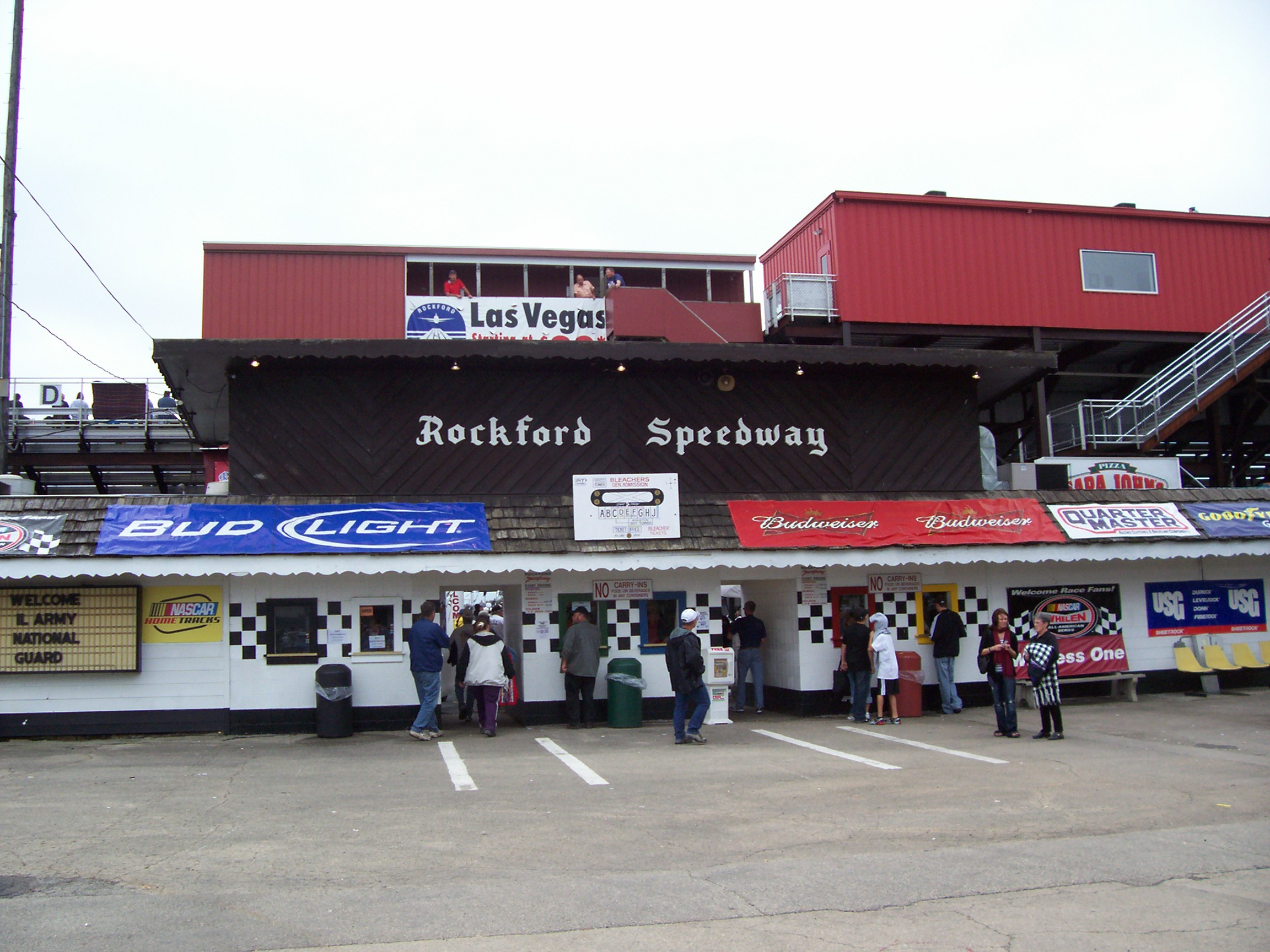
Ticket booth and grandstands

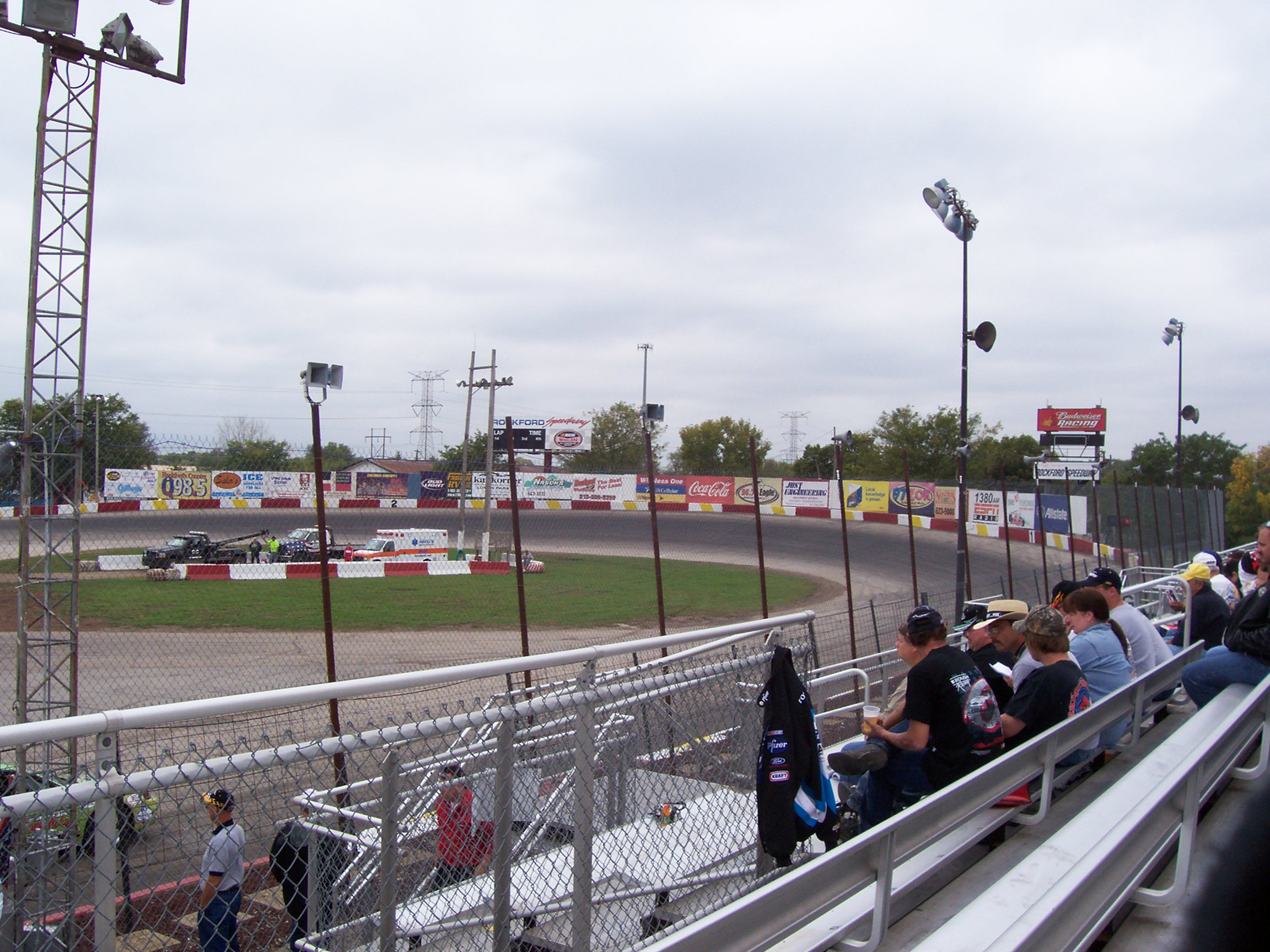
Turns 1 and 2

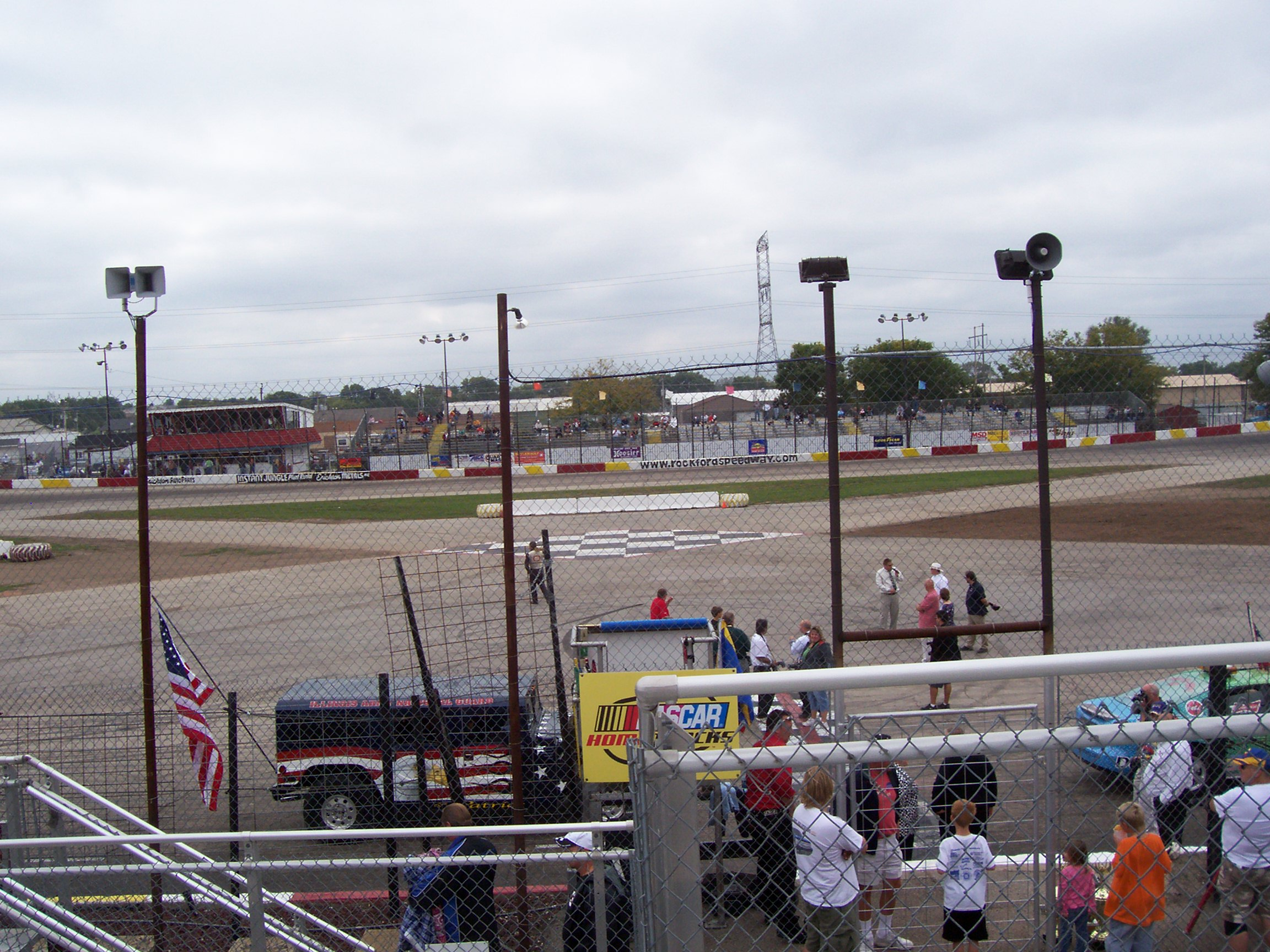
Infield featuring the Figure 8 crossing

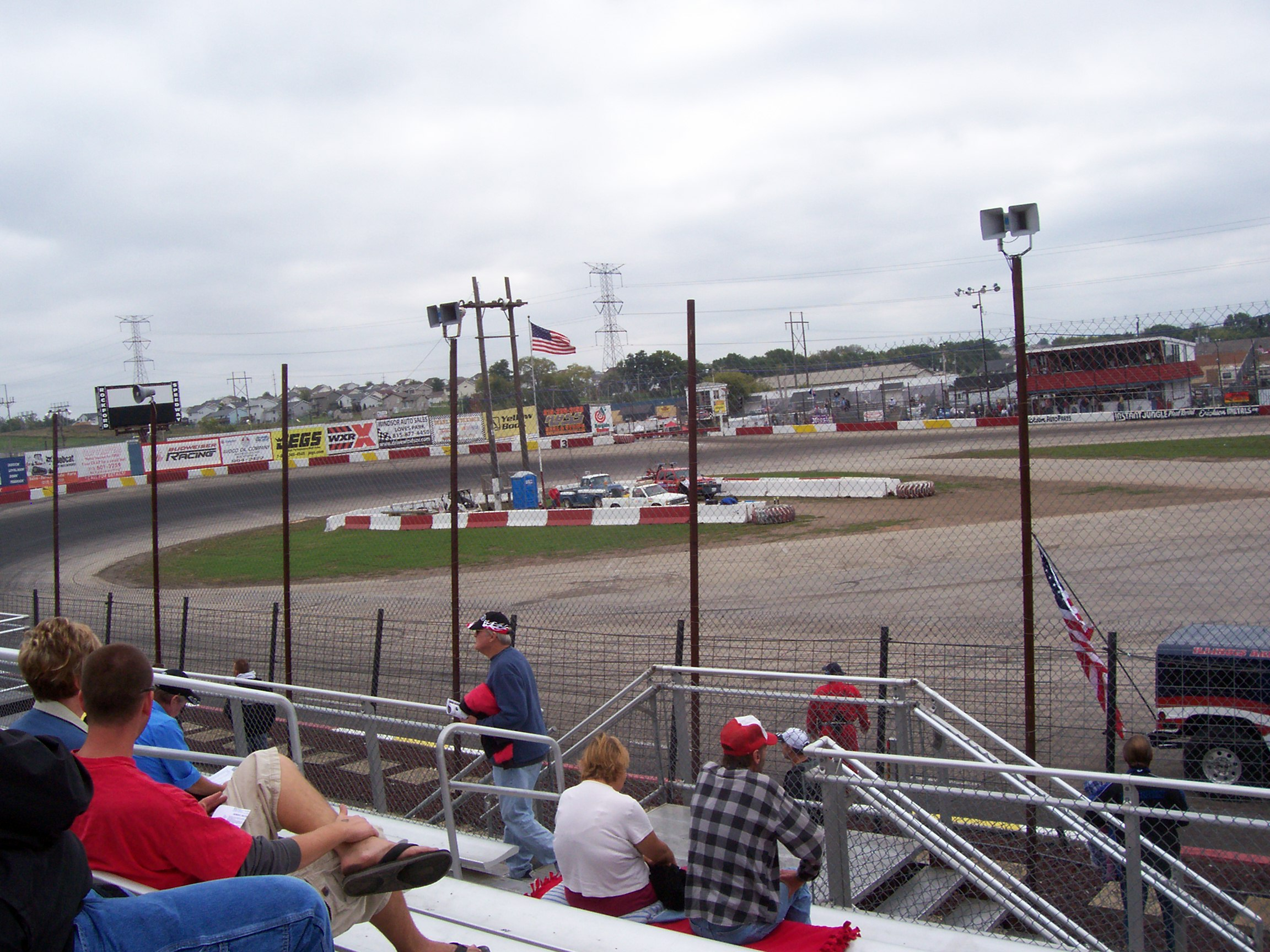
Turns 3 and 4

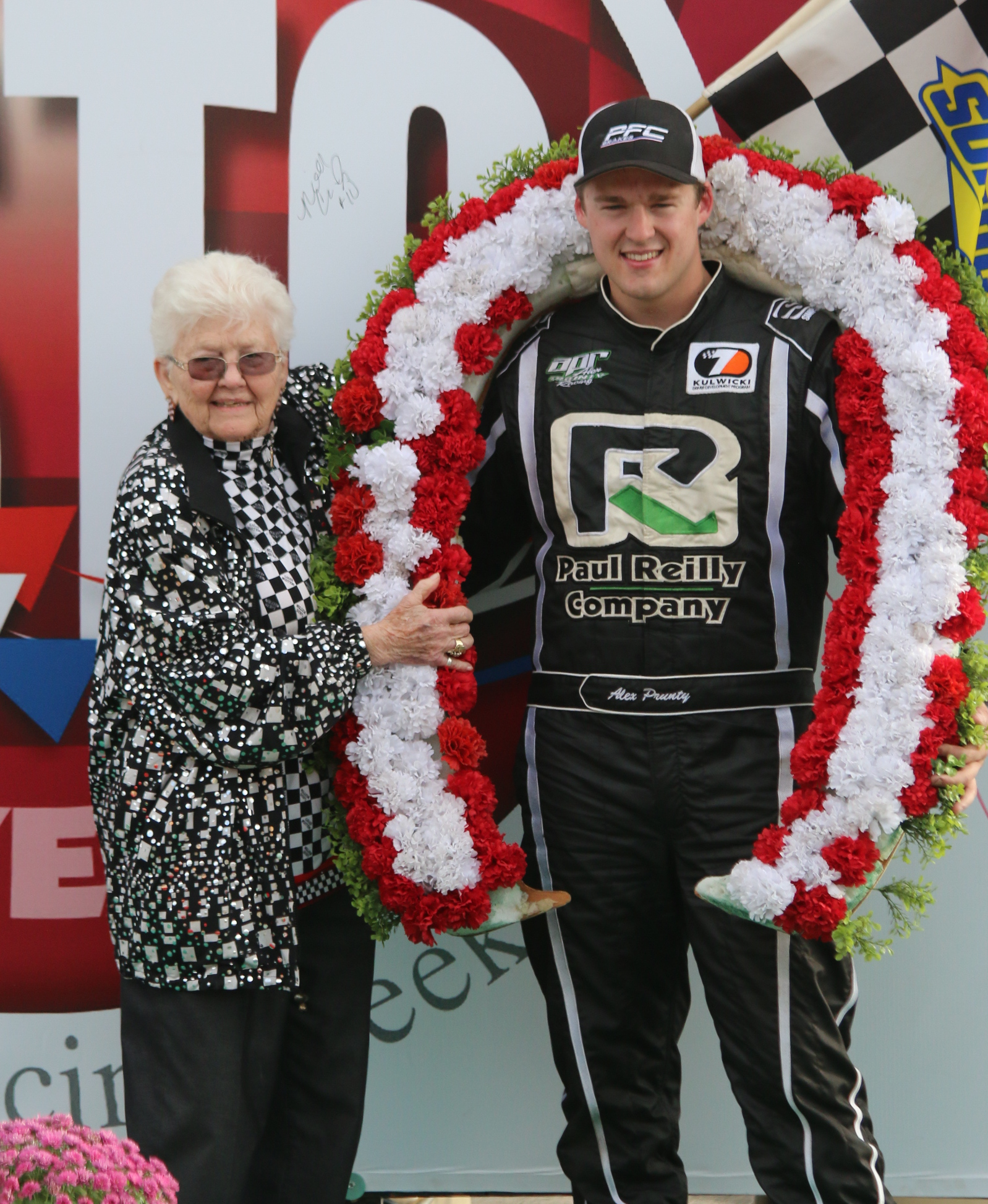
2017 National Short Track Championship winner Alex Prunty (right) with owner Jody Deery
