= Robin Pemberton =

NASCAR crew chief

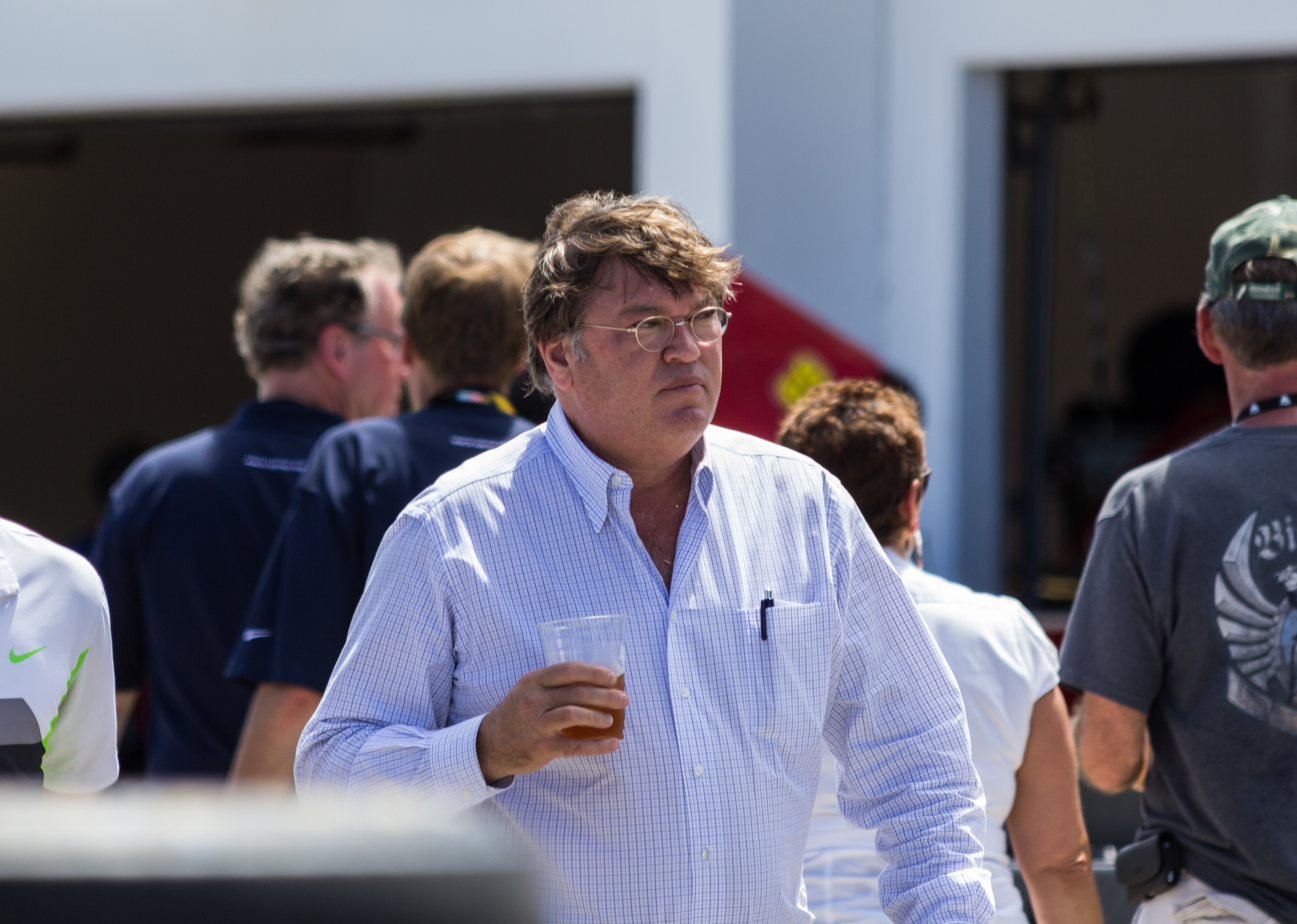
Pemberton at the 2013 Coke Zero 400.

Robert (Robin) Pemberton (born August 15, 1956) is an American motor racing official and former vice president for competition of NASCAR.

Previously, Pemberton was a crew chief for several NASCAR teams over the course of 17 years, heading teams for Rusty Wallace, Mark Martin and Kyle Petty. Pemberton was field manager for Ford Racing immediately prior to being named VP of Competition.

== NASCAR team member ==
Pemberton began his NASCAR career as a mechanic and fabricator with Petty Enterprises in 1979, becoming a crew chief in 1983. He moved to Roush Racing at its inception in 1987, then moved to SABCO Racing from 1992 to 1994, then moved to Penske Racing South in 1995. Pemberton was Wallace's crew chief for 230 races, which had been the longest driver/crew chief combination in NASCAR. He returned to Petty to serve as general manager in 2002. He now resides in Charlotte, North Carolina, the capital of NASCAR. He has two sons, Bray and Briggs.

== NASCAR official ==
In his former position, Pemberton was in charge of rules enforcement. That sometimes made him the object of criticism from drivers, crews and the sport's particularly rabid fans. Pemberton was also called on to enforce discipline among drivers, often in consultation with Sprint Cup Series Director John Darby and NASCAR President Mike Helton. Pemberton gained notoriety before and during the 2007 Daytona 500, in particular the 2007 NASCAR Gatorade Duel scandal, when he suspended six crew chiefs for various infractions, and also threw out the director of competition for Michael Waltrip Racing's new team for using an illegal fuel additive during qualifying. Pemberton also penalized the team 100 NEXTEL Series driver and owner points, one of the most severe point penalties in the modern history of NASCAR's top level of racing.

His brother Ryan Pemberton was Mark Martin's crew chief in 2007. Martin and Kevin Harvick were battling for the win on the final lap of the 2007 Daytona 500. The race ended under caution flag when a big wreck happened on that final lap. Robin Pemberton determined the exact moment that the caution flag was displayed, which resulted in Harvick being declared the winner. "We [Robin and Ryan Pemberton] keep the business part separate," Ryan Pemberton said. "We don't put ourselves in position to do that. I don't call him to talk to him about it. I don't ask him any questions."

One of his most famous quotes is Have at it, boys; which was the new philosophy of the Sprint Cup Series in the 2010s.

On December 1, 2015, Pemberton announced that he will be leaving his Senior Vice President of Competition position with NASCAR at the end of 2015.

Currently, Pemberton serves on an INDYCAR appeals board panel whose job is to hear all appeals. Former NASCAR official John Darby also serves as an INDYCAR board member.

On September 8, 2021; Pemberton's son, Robin Brayden Pemberton, died at the age of 35.
