= Joe Shear =

American racing driver

Joe Shear, Sr.
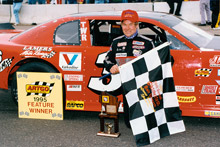
- Born: May 8, 1943
- Died: March 6, 1998 (aged 54)

ARTGO Challenge Series
- Years active: 1975–1997
- Starts: 330+
- Wins: 51
- Best finish: 1st in 1986, 1989

Previous series
- 1975—1997: ASA National Tour

Championship titles
- 1986, 1989: ARTGO Challenge Series

Joe Shear, Sr. (May 8, 1943 – March 6, 1998) was an American stock car racing driver from Clinton, Wisconsin. He won an estimated 350 races in his career, including four of his last five races. Fred Nielsen, Shear's car owner from 1975 to 1984 and 1986 to 1994, said that his team won 250 races and he estimates that Shear won six-hundred races. He won at least thirty track or touring series championships in his career. Even though he was known as a pavement driver, two of those championships were on the dirt at Freeport, Illinois.

== Racing career ==
Shear began racing karts as a youth. While he was still under age, he would sneak in the pits to work on his father Al Shear's racecar at Rockford Speedway. His father won the track's championship in 1951, 1962, and 1965. Shear was named the track's Outstanding Mechanic for 1962.

Shear began racing at Rockford in 1964 and he won the track's Rookie of the Year award. He had his first win at the track on his birthday May 8, 1965. In 1972, Shear was awarded his sixth straight Rockford track championship. That year he won the first of his eight National Short Track Championship events at the track.

Shear finished second behind Dick Trickle with 58 ARTGO wins and he won the championship of the Midwestern touring series in 1986 and 1989. In 1979, 1987, and 1989 he won the Red, White, and Blue State championship races at Wisconsin International Raceway. During the Daytona Speedweeks, he won the World Series of Asphalt Stock Car Racing at New Smyrna Speedway in 1988 and 1989, and in 1990 he won the Volusia County Speedway championship. Shear was a four-time winner at the Slinger Nationals at Slinger Super Speedway (1987, 1990, 1991, 1993) also won the Wisconsin Short Track Series title in 1994.

Shear won six ARTGO events in 1996 plus five out of six special events at Wisconsin International Raceway. He could feel cancer returning in May 1996, but he decided to continue racing. In February 1997 he had surgery to remove his lymph nodes and muscles on his neck. He was unable to prepare his car for the upcoming season and he received five weeks of radiation.

With his health failing, Shear won four of the last five races in his career. His final victory was winning the 1997 National Short Track Championship race at Rockford. He was recorded laps 0.2 seconds faster than the rest of the cars at the Saturday qualifying race for his final event at the Oktoberfest race at La Crosse Fairgrounds Speedway until his motor blew up. Shear borrowed another driver's car which had already qualified for the Sunday finale and raced from the last place up to fourth place. He had won the event five times, mainly later in his career.

== Personality ==
Shear was known for being very quiet. His wife Connie said, "There were times, especially early in his career, when he would not talk to a soul. He would go to the track, unload the car, set a track record, win the feature, and leave."

== Death and legacy ==
Shear discovered he had cancer three years before he died. He died on March 6, 1998.

Madison International Speedway has held an ARCA Midwest Tour memorial race since 2008 (except in 2020, where it was held at Dells Raceway Park because Madison could not hold events because of pandemic restrictions.

His son Joe Shear, Jr. is a NASCAR champion crew chief, primarily with Johnny Sauter, coincidentally the son of Shear's rival Jim Sauter.

Sporting positions
Preceded by Dick Trickle	ARTGO Challenge Series Champion; 1986	Succeeded by Dick Trickle
Preceded by Butch Miller	ARTGO Challenge Series Champion; 1989	Succeeded by Steve Carlson
