= Vores Compact Touring Series =

The Vores Compact Touring Series (VCTS) is an American stock car racing series for compact cars. It was established in late 2011 when the CRA (Champion Racing Association) decided to drop its compact division. The first race held was in late 2011, it was an exhibition race at Eldora Speedway in Rossburg, Ohio.

2012 was the inaugural year for VCTS. All but one of the races held that year were held at the Winchester Speedway, the other being Eldora Speedway. Ryan Hoffman of Northwestern Indiana was the series' first champion.

2013 would be the second year of the Vores Compact Touring Series. The series would expand its venues to five tracks in 2013: Lucas Oil Raceway at Indianapolis, Winchester Speedway, Baer Field Speedway, Shadybowl Speedway and Gas City I-69 Speedway. Chris Jennings of Indiana would be the 2013 series champion.

2014 marks VCTS's third year of competition. VCTS would expand this year and have a Northern and Southern tour along with "Challenge Series" weekends were the North and South would meet at the same venue. VCTS would have 12 different tracks scheduled for 2014. Gary Eaton, Jr. of Ohio would claim the VCTS South championship. Mike Richardson of Valparaiso, Indiana would be the North series champion. And Todd Metz, Jr. won the Challenge Series title. Kyle Stark won the 1st Annual World Series of Compacts and Vores Cup.

2015 marked the fourth year of competition with Gary Eaton, Jr. winning the 2015 VCTS South Championship, Craig Frase VCTS North Champion, and Dan Irvine Phantom Race Gear Challenge Series Champion. Phil Malouf won the 2nd Annual World Series of Compacts at the Kalamazoo Speedway.

Steve Vore of Vores Welding & Steel in Fort Recovery, Ohio is the series founder. VCTS South Series Director is Dan Redmond. The VCTS North Series was a two year sanctioning agreement with Andy Jach and Patrick Mcnamara with Midwest Compacts, LLC. Both parties separated after the 2015 season with VCTS focusing on Southern Indiana and MCTS focusing on Michigan and Wisconsin.
