= ARTGO =

American auto racing series

The ARTGO Challenge Series was a late model short track racing series that ran in the Midwestern United States from 1975 until 1998. Many race car drivers used the ARTGO series as a stepping stone to get into ASA, ARCA, and NASCAR.

Art Frigo created the series with the help of Bob Roper and John McKarns. He came up with the name by taking his first full name and the last two letters of his last name, coming up with the name ARTGO. The first race was held on September 7, 1975, at the Grundy County Speedway in Morris, Illinois. The inaugural Wayne Carter Classic was won by Tom Reffner.

Frigo sold the series to John & Sue McKarns in 1979. In 1998 the McKarns licensed the name to NASCAR and NASCAR took full control of the series. The series went through different name changes with different title sponsors, including the RE/MAX Challenge Series, International Truck & Engine Midwest Series, and finally the AutoZone Elite Division, Midwest Series.

Under the NASCAR era, the series had identical rules to three other NASCAR regional series (Northwest, Southeast, and Southwest). In 2006, after dwindling car counts and lack of races on the schedule NASCAR finally shut down the AutoZone Elite Division.

To replace the NASCAR Midwest Series, the ASA Midwest Tour was created in 2007 by Racing Speed Associates, LLC as a new touring series that was similar in format to the former ARTGO Challenge Series. The ARTGO series had drivers like Paul Menard, Matt Kenseth (2003 NASCAR Cup Series Champion), Butch Miller, Dick Trickle, Joe Shear, Jim Sauter, Eddie Hoffman, Steve Carlson, Kevin Cywinski, Jim Weber, Justin Diercks, Tim Schendel, Jason Schuler and Jeff Frederickson.

== Past ASA/ARCA Midwest Tour Champions ==
- 2025 - Casey Johnson
- 2024 - Gabe Sommers
- 2023 - Gabe Sommers
- 2022 - Casey Johnson
- 2021 - Ty Majeski
- 2020 - Casey Johnson
- 2019 - Casey Johnson
- 2018 - Dalton Zehr
- 2017 - Ty Majeski
- 2016 - Ty Majeski
- 2015 - Ty Majeski
- 2014 - Ty Majeski
- 2013 - Dan Fredrickson
- 2012 - Jonathan Eilen
- 2011 - Andrew Morrissey
- 2010 - Steve Carlson
- 2009 - Steve Carlson
- 2008 - Dan Fredrickson
- 2007 - Nathan Haseleu

== Past NASCAR/Midwest Champions ==
- 2006 - Tim Schendel
- 2005 - Justin Diercks
- 2004 - Justin Diercks
- 2003 - Steve Carlson
- 2002 - Steve Carlson
- 2001 - Steve Carlson
- 2000 - Steve Carlson
- 1999 - Brian Hoppe
- 1998 - Brian Hoppe*

== Past ARTGO Champions ==
- 1997 - Eddie Hoffman
- 1996 - Steve Carlson
- 1995 - Kevin Cywinski
- 1994 - Steve Carlson
- 1993 - Jim Weber
- 1992 - Jim Weber
- 1991 - Steve Carlson
- 1990 - Steve Carlson
- 1989 - Joe Shear
- 1988 - Butch Miller
- 1987 - Dick Trickle
- 1986 - Joe Shear
- 1985 - Dick Trickle
- 1984 - Dick Trickle
- 1983 - Dick Trickle
- 1982 - Jim Sauter
- 1981 - Jim Sauter
- 1980 - Dick Trickle
- 1979 - Dick Trickle
- 1978 - Tom Reffner
- 1977 - Dick Trickle
- 1976 - Dave Watson
- 1975 - Tom Reffner
