= John Darby (NASCAR official) =

American motor racing official

John Darby is an American motor racing official, currently serving as Managing Director of Competition Director of NASCAR. In this capacity, oversees the competition directors of the NASCAR Cup Series (a position Darby previously held), the Xfinity Series, and the Camping World Truck Series. In his position, he is in charge of the officials in each series who usually determine penalties to be imposed for infractions by drivers and crews. He is still competition director for the NCS(NASCAR Cup Series) until a replacement is found.

== Career ==
Darby got his start at Rockford in 1971 as an owner of a street stock at Rockford Speedway. In 1976 he became crew chief for a late model that he owned which won the 1977 championship. He stopped owning the racecar in 1982 and became a track official He moved up the NASCAR ranks as a technical official, and by 1994 he was the director for the NASCAR Busch Series (now Xfinity Series). After three years he was named the director of competition for the Winston Cup Series (NASCAR Cup Series).
