= 2011 ASA Midwest Tour season =

2011 ASA Midwest Tour

Seasons
- ← 2010 2012 →

The 2011 ASA Kwik-Trip Midwest Tour presented by Echo Outdoor Power Equipment and grandstay.net was the fifth season of the American Speed Association's Midwest Tour. The championship was held over 12 races, beginning May 1 in Oregon, Wisconsin, and ending October 9 in West Salem, Wisconsin. Andrew Morrissey was the champion.

== Schedule and results ==
Rnd	Date	Race Name	Track	Location	Fast Qualifier	Winner
1	May 1	Joe Shear Classic 136	Madison International Speedway	Oregon, Wisconsin	Bryan Reffner	Ross Kenseth
2	May 15	SCAG Power Equipment Dixieland 100	Wisconsin International Raceway	Kaukauna, Wisconsin	Andrew Morrissey	Tim Schendel
3	June 3	Wayne Carter Classic 125 presented by ECHO Bear Cat	Grundy County Speedway	Morris, Illinois	Chris Weinkauf	Ross Kenseth
4	June 18	Elmer Musgrave Memorial 100	Illiana Motor Speedway	Schererville, Indiana	Andrew Morrissey	Ross Kenseth
5	June 23	River Valley Bank Flip Merwin Memorial 150	State Park Speedway	Wausau, Wisconsin	Jonathan Eilen	Mark Mackesy
6	July 2	Marshfield 100	Marshfield Motor Speedway	Marshfield, Wisconsin	Jacob Goede	Jason Weinkauf
7	July 9	Grandstay Summer Clash 250	Elko Speedway	Elko, Minnesota	Chris Weinkauf	Skylar Holzhausen
8	August 5	Sandvik Coromant 150 presented by Cline Tool	Iowa Speedway	Newton, Iowa	Nathan Haseleu	Jeff Choquette
9	August 12	Miller 100 presented by McGrath Powersports	Hawkeye Downs Speedway	Cedar Rapids, Iowa	Andrew Morrissey	Jonathan Eilen
10	August 21	Shakopee 125	Raceway Park	Shakopee, Minnesota	Nick Panitzke	Nathan Haseleu
11	October 2	National Short Track Championship 200	Rockford Speedway	Loves Park, Illinois	Chris Wimmer	Steve Carlson
12	October 9	Oktoberfest 100	La Crosse Fairgrounds Speedway	West Salem, Wisconsin	Griffin McGrath	Johnny Sauter

== Championship points ==
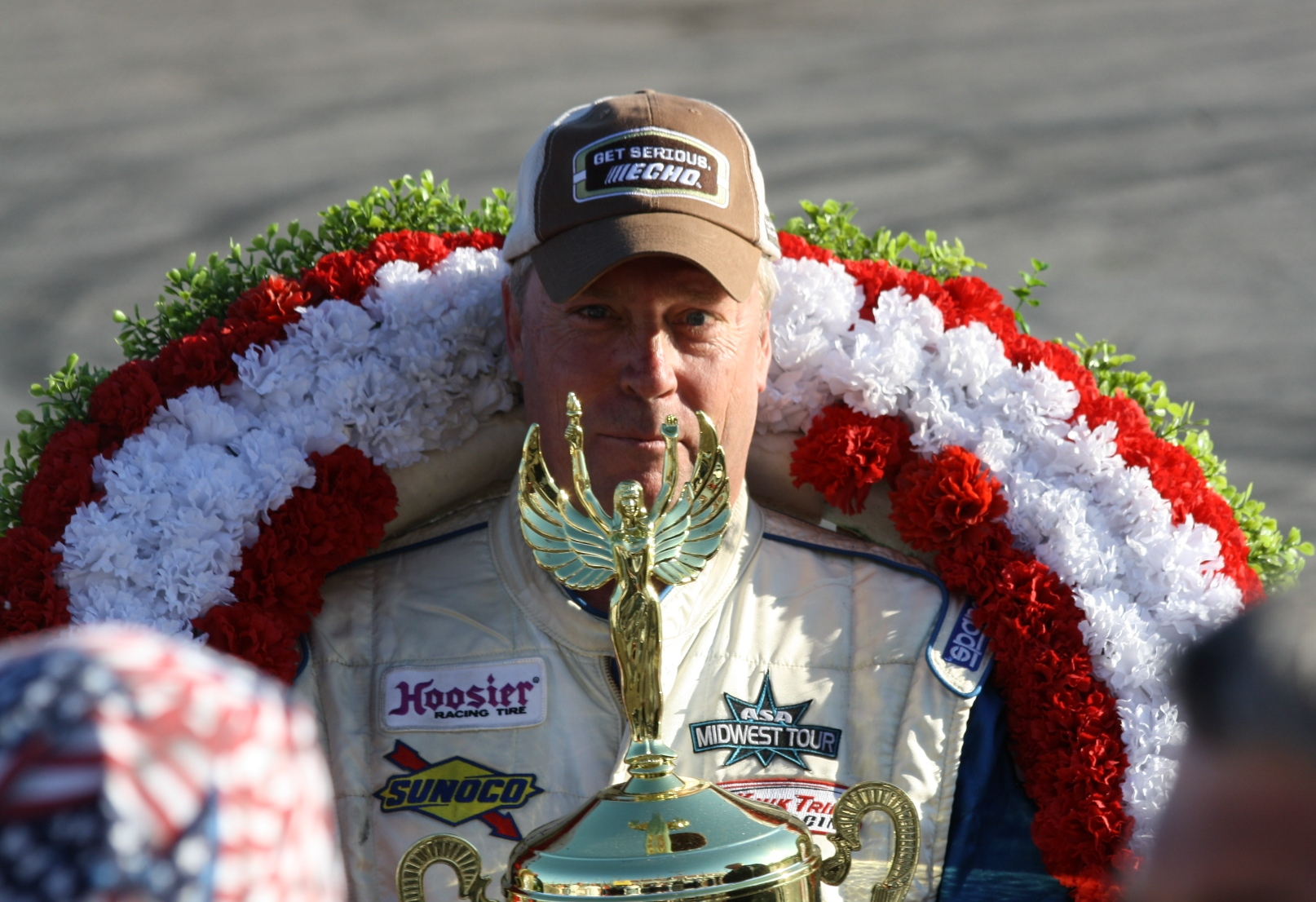
Steve Carlson won the National Short Track Championship at Rockford Speedway.

Pos	Driver	Points
1	Andrew Morrissey	1758
2	Jacob Goede	1707
3	Nathan Haseleu	1701
4	Tim Schendel	1675
5	Chris Wimmer	1647
6	Jonathan Eilen	1613
7	Griffin McGrath	1613
8	Chris Weinkauf	1607
9	Skylar Holzhausen (R)	1606
10	Steve Carlson	1597
11	Nick Panitzke	1595
12	Ross Kenseth	1553
13	Jeff Storm	1518
14	Nick Murgic	1504
15	Michael Bilderback	1394
16	Joel Theisen (R)	1304
17	Mark Kraus	1043
18	Thor Anderson	1,000
19	Gary LaMonte	915
20	Travis Sauter	858
21	Bryan Reffner	720
22	Brandon Hill	668
23	Becca Kasten	589
24	Erik Darnell	568
25	Matt Tifft	522
26	Jeremy Spoonmore (R)	513
27	Boris Jurkovic	505
28	Jeff Cannon (R)	496
29	Danny Darnell	414
30	Ronnie Rihn	410
31	Jim Olson (R)	406
32	Jason Weinkauf	404
33	Dan Fredrickson	401
34	Eddie Hoffman	383
35	Cardell Potter	375
36	Jamie Iverson	370
37	Rich Loch	338
38	Kris Kelly	334
39	Russ Blakeley	296
40	Jeff Choquette	284
41	Tim Sauter	279
42	Matt Kocourek	278
43	Steve Holzhausen	256
44	Kyle Calmes	243
45	Blake Brown	238
46	Tim Plummer	237
47	Conrad Jorgenson	235
48	Dean Cornelius	232
49	Neil Knoblock	232
50	Colin Reffner	230
51	Steve Apel	230
52	Mason Mitchell	224
53	Brad Osborn	223
54	Jeremy Lepak	216
55	Erik Pierce	210
56	Mike Carlson	210
57	Dean LaPointe	210
58	Tommy Pecaro	197
59	Paul Paine	169
60	Mark Mackesy	166
61	Steve Rubeck	160
62	Larry Schuler	149
63	Brad Mueller	139
64	Rich Bickle	137
65	Donny Reuvers	135
66	Jon Reynolds, Jr.	133
67	Ben Pettis	132
68	Adam Royle	132
69	Jeff VanOudenhoven	130
70	Tom Gee, Jr.	128
71	Mike Meyerhofer	127
72	Brett Piontek	126
73	Ryan Johnson	125
74	Ryan Carlson	125
75	Burton Brown	122
76	Jake Vanoskey	117
77	Eugene Gregorich	116
78	Billy Knippenburg	115
79	Chris Eggleston	114
80	Molly Rhoads	114
81	Brett Sontag	114
82	John Nutley	113
83	Joey Gase	113
84	Josh Vadnais	112
85	Tom Muhr	112
86	Mark Sontag, Jr.	111
87	Curt Tillman	109
88	Weston Griffith, Jr.	101
89	Jerry Sharp	99
90	Clint SIllars	99
91	Travis Thompson	99
92	Corey Jankowski	99
93	Jesse Haase	98
94	Bradley Tilton	98
95	Chad Walen	98
96	Josh Wallace	95
97	Jordan Sims	93
98	Greg Vangool	93
99	James Getait	91
100	Brett Peters	90
101	Johnny Sauter	65
102	Danny Odell	51
103	Jay Foster	51
104	Max McNamara	51
105	Mikie Breiner	51
