= 2010 ASA Midwest Tour season =

2010 ASA Midwest Tour

Seasons
- ← 2009 2011 →

The 2010 ASA Kwik-Trip Midwest Tour presented by Echo Outdoor Power Equipment and grandstay.net was the fourth season of the American Speed Association's Midwest Tour. The championship was held over 11 races, beginning May 2 in Oregon, Wisconsin, and ending October 10 in West Salem, Wisconsin. Steve Carlson was the champion.

== Schedule and results ==
Rnd	Date	Race Name	Track	Location	Fast Qualifier	Winner
1	May 2	Joe Shear Classic 136 presented by ECHO Chain Saws	Madison International Speedway	Oregon, Wisconsin	Chris Wimmer	Steve Carlson
2	June 5	Elko 100 presented by grandstay.net	Elko Speedway	Elko, Minnesota	Donny Reuvers	Ross Kenseth
3	June 11	Keith Fleck/Miller 100	Hawkeye Downs Speedway	Cedar Rapids, Iowa	Steve Carlson	Steve Carlson
4	June 19	Elmer Musgrave Memorial presented by Texas Corral	Illiana Motor Speedway	Schererville, Indiana	Ross Kenseth	Steve Carlson
5	June 29	Swiss Colony All-Star Challenge 100	Madison International Speedway	Oregon, Wisconsin	Matt Kenseth	Matt Kenseth
6	July 18	Kwik Trip 125	Raceway Park	Shakopee, Minnesota	Michael Bilderback	Nathan Haseleu
7	August 3	Dixieland 150	Wisconsin International Raceway	Kaukauna, Wisconsin	Johnny Sauter	Johnny Sauter
8	August 14	Dells 100	Dells Raceway Park	Wisconsin Dells, Wisconsin	Chris Wimmer	Tim Schendel
9	August 21	Marshfield 100	Marshfield Motor Speedway	Marshfield, Wisconsin	Nathan Haseleu	Chris Wimmer
10	September 5	Labor Day 125	Norway Speedway	Norway, Michigan	Chris Weinkauf	Jamie Iverson
11	October 10	Oktoberfest 100	La Crosse Fairgrounds Speedway	West Salem, Wisconsin	Griffin McGrath	Dan Fredrickson

== Championship points ==
Pos	Driver	Points
1	Steve Carlson	1841
2	Chris Wimmer	1823
3	Nathan Haseleu	1725
4	Ross Kenseth (R)	1721
5	Jacob Goede	1709
6	Nick Murgic	1653
7	Griffin McGrath (R)	1638
8	Tim Schendel	1637
9	Jamie Iverson	1607
10	Andrew Morrissey	1602
11	Jeff Storm	1544
12	Michael Bilderback (R)	1532
13	Nick Panitzke	1489
14	Thor Anderson (R)	1485
15	Dan Fredrickson	1434
16	Travis Sauter	1427
17	Mark Kraus	1296
18	Blake Brown	1255
19	Gary LaMonte (R)	1166
20	Eugene Gregorich Jr.	1135
21	Mark Eswein	872
22	Joel Theisen (R)	662
23	Paul Paine	647
24	Skylar Holzhausen	613
25	Chris Weinkauf	605
26	Brandon Hill	582
27	Mike Carlson	573
28	Matt Kocourek	512
29	Tim Sauter	492
30	Bryan Reffner	488
31	Johnny Sauter	462
32	Boris Jurkovic	453
33	Dave Feiler	448
34	Jonathan Eilen	401
35	Steve Holzhausen	399
36	Kris Kelly	334
37	Donny Reuvers	330
38	Jeff Cannon	323
39	Gregg VanGool	323
40	Jason Weinkauf	294
41	Terry Baldry	290
42	Chad Selk (R)	289
43	Kyle Calmes	270
44	Jeremy Lepak	266
45	Ryan Johnson	254
46	Danny Darnell	250
47	Brian Johnson Jr.	244
48	Curt Tillman	243
49	Ronnie Rihn	242
50	Steve Rubeck	237
51	Ken Reiser	232
52	Tom Gee Jr.	227
53	Becca Kasten	203
54	Michael Gunderson	198
55	Jim Olson (R)	186
56	Matt Kenseth	182
57	Darren Wolke	175
58	Dean LaPointe	164
59	Adam Royle	155
60	Dean Corneilus	153
61	Eddie Hoffman	146
62	Billy Mohn	146
63	Joey Gase	143
64	Matt Goede	141
65	Jeff Van Oudenhoven	138
66	Jay Baumler	138
67	Dudley Fleck	137
68	Bobby Wilberg	136
69	Jim Sauter Jr.	136
70	Russ Blakeley	136
71	Anthony Danta	133
72	Josh Hamner	133
73	Andy Monday	132
74	Tony Stewart	132
75	Mike Reichenberger	132
76	Jon Olson	131
77	Steve Anderson	128
78	Scott Stanchina	128
79	Troy Hintzche	126
80	Justin Jennings	125
81	Kelly Bires	125
82	Brad Dvorak	124
83	Chad Wood	124
84	Jason Schneider	124
85	Brett Sontag	122
86	Robb Vanderloop	122
87	Frank Kreyer	120
88	Josh Vadnais	119
89	Scott Wimmer	119
90	Andy Niles	113
91	Dan Lindsley	101
92	Mark Lamoreaux	101
93	Tom Lindquist	100
94	Blake Bjorklund	99
95	Josh Wallace	99
96	Neil Knoblock	99
97	Mitch Curran	99
98	Derek Gress	98
99	Brian Stanchina	98
100	Brent Kirchner	97
101	Eric Pierce	97
102	Russ Blakeley	97
103	Jill George	96
104	Jeremy Spoonmore	96
105	Tim Hintt	96
106	Joe Johnson	95
107	Randy Rogers	95
108	Rick Corso	94
109	Jack Kalwasinski	93
110	Michael Bachaus	93
111	Ricky Baker	92
112	Rita Fields	91
113	Colin Reffner	68
114	Brad Osborn	51
