= 2012 ASA Midwest Tour season =

2012 ASA Midwest Tour

Seasons
- ← 2011 2013 →

The 2012 ASA Kwik-Trip Midwest Tour presented by Echo Outdoor Power Equipment and grandstay.net will be the sixth season of the American Speed Association's Midwest Tour. The championship will be held over 13 races, beginning May 6 in Oregon, Wisconsin, and ending October 7 in West Salem, Wisconsin.

== Schedule and results ==
Rnd	Date	Race Name	Track	Location	Fastest Qualifier	Winner
1	May 6	Joe Shear Classic 136	Madison International Speedway	Oregon, Wisconsin	Chris Wimmer	Andrew Morrissey
2	May 19	World Wide Packaging State Park 125	State Park Speedway	Wausau, Wisconsin	Matt Tifft	Dan Fredrickson
3	June 2	Port City Racecars 100	Berlin Raceway	Marne, Michigan	Brian Campbell	Brian Campbell
4	June 12	Howie Lettow Memorial 150	Milwaukee Mile	West Allis, Wisconsin	John Hunter Nemechek	Travis Sauter
5	June 30	Marshfield 100	Marshfield Motor Speedway	Marshfield, Wisconsin	Chris Wimmer	Jonathan Eilen
6	July 20	Wayne Carter Classic 100	Grundy County Speedway	Morris, Illinois	Chris Wimmer	Eddie Hoffman
7	August 4	Colony Brands 100	Madison International Speedway	Oregon, Wisconsin	Nathan Haseleu	Travis Sauter
8	August 10	Norway 100	Norway Speedway	Norway, Michigan	Chris Weinkauf	Nathan Haseleu
9	August 18	Governor's Cup 125	Elko Speedway	Elko, Minnesota	Chris Wimmer	Travis Sauter
10	September 14	Iowa 150	Iowa Speedway	Newton, Iowa	Griffin McGrath	Brent Kirchner
11	September 22	Thunderstruck 93	Elko Speedway	Elko, Minnesota	Dan Fredrickson	Dan Fredrickson
12	October 7	Oktoberfest 100	La Crosse Fairgrounds Speedway	West Salem, Wisconsin	Jeff Storm	Travis Sauter
