= Kenseth =

Kenseth is a surname. Notable people with the surname include:

- Matt Kenseth (born 1972), American racing driver
- Ross Kenseth (born 1993), American racing driver, son of Matt

== See also ==
- Kenneth
- Kensett (disambiguation)
- Kensit
