= Kensit =

Kensit is a surname of Old English, pre-7th-century origins. It derives from a locality, probably either Kingsettle in Somerset, which translates as "the seat of the King", and is believed to relate to Alfred the Great, or possibly Kingside in Cumberland, or to some now lost village or town with a similar spelling.

Notable people with the surname Kensit include:

- John Kensit (1853–1902), English religious leader and polemicist
- Patsy Kensit (born 1968), English actress
- Louisa Bolus née Kensit (1877–1970), South African botanist

Kensit Market Intelligence is also a British search engine and online market intelligence software platform created by ScotAi.

== See also ==
- John Frederick Kensett (1816–1872), American artist and engraver
- Kenseth, surname
