= Miramar Beach, Florida =

- Census-designated place
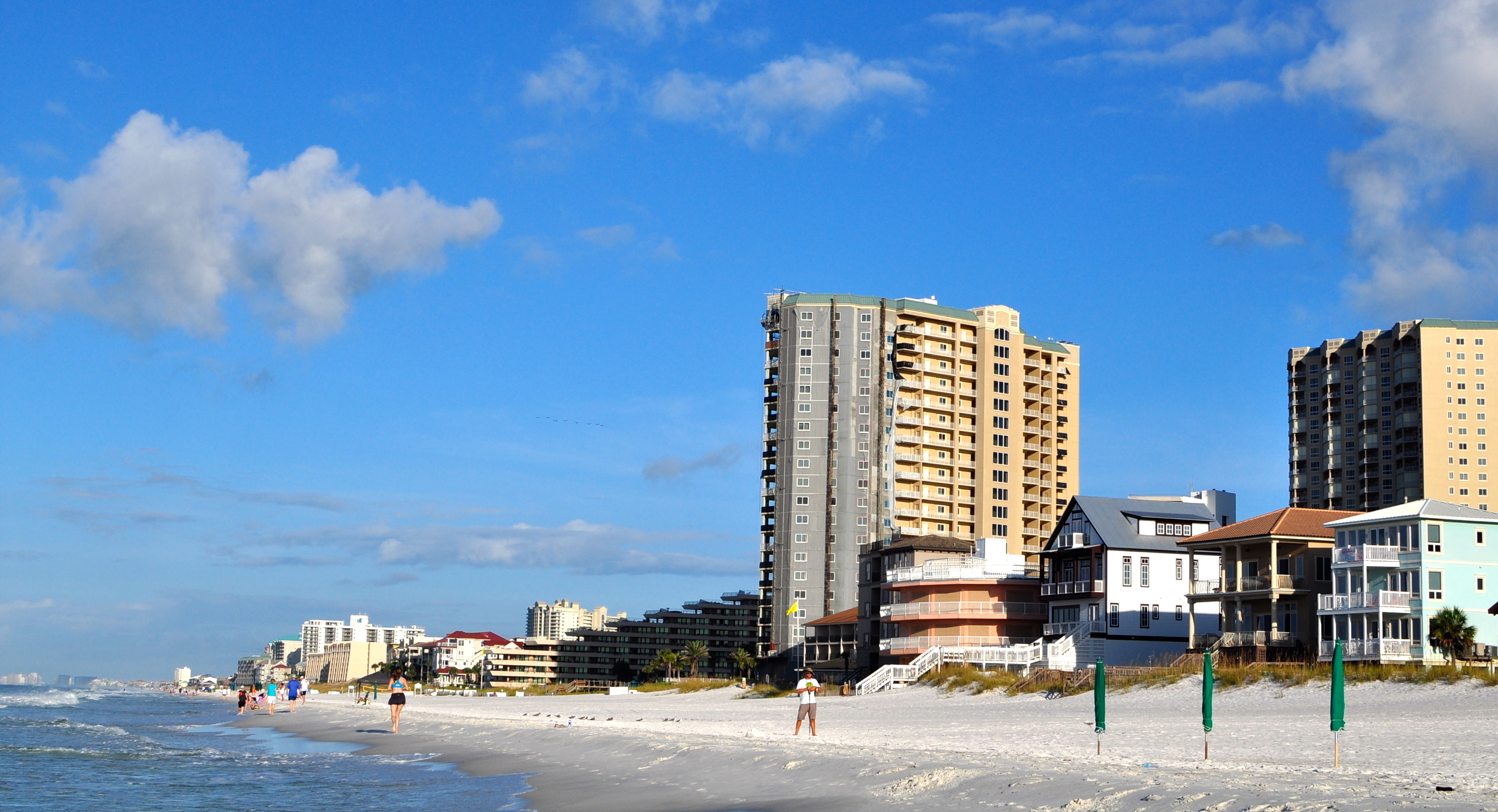
- Gulf of Mexico at Miramar Beach, September 2014

- Location in Walton County and the state of Florida
- Coordinates: 30°22′48″N 86°21′30″W
- Country: United States
- State: Florida
- County: Walton

Area
  - Total: 7.36 sq mi (19.07 km^{2})
  - Land: 7.02 sq mi (18.19 km^{2})
  - Water: 0.34 sq mi (0.88 km^{2})
- Elevation: 7 ft (2.1 m)

Population (2020)
  - Total: 8,002
  - Density: 1,139.5/sq mi (439.97/km^{2})
- Time zone: UTC-6 (Central (CST))
  - Summer (DST): UTC-5 (CDT)
- ZIP code: 32550
- Area code: 850
- FIPS code: 12-46000
- GNIS feature ID: 2403296

Miramar Beach is a census-designated place (CDP) in Walton County, Florida, United States. The population was 8,002 at the 2020 census, up from 6,146 at the 2010 census. It is part of the Crestview—Fort Walton Beach–Destin, Florida Metropolitan Statistical Area. Although many other coastal localities in Florida have appended "Beach" to their names to distinguish themselves from an adjacent inland or cross-bay municipality – such as Miami Beach, St. Pete Beach, Fort Myers Beach, Panama City Beach, Melbourne Beach, Cocoa Beach, and Jacksonville Beach – the city of Miramar, Florida is actually over 450 miles (720 km) away in South Florida. Miramar Beach is due east of Destin, Florida. It is often considered to be part of the city of Destin. However, it has its own ZIP code (32550) and is in Walton County, whereas Destin is in Okaloosa County.

== Geography ==
Miramar Beach is located in the southwestern corner of Walton County.

The CDP is located along the Gulf Coast. U.S. Route 98 is the main route through the CDP, and leads east 47 mi (76 km) to Panama City and west 9 mi (14 km) to Destin.

According to the United States Census Bureau, the total area of 4.7 square miles (12 km^{2}), of which 4.6 square miles (12 km^{2}) is land and 0.1 square miles (0.26 km^{2}) (2.54%) is water.

== Demographics ==
Historical population
Census	Pop.	Note	%±
1990	1,644		—
2000	2,435		48.1%
2010	6,146		152.4%
2020	8,002		30.2%
U.S. Decennial Census

=== 2020 census ===
As of the 2020 census, Miramar Beach had a population of 8,002. The median age was 58.6 years. 11.4% of residents were under the age of 18 and 36.4% of residents were 65 years of age or older. For every 100 females there were 90.6 males, and for every 100 females age 18 and over there were 89.6 males age 18 and over.

100.0% of residents lived in urban areas, while 0.0% lived in rural areas.

There were 3,840 households in Miramar Beach, of which 15.1% had children under the age of 18 living in them. Of all households, 56.3% were married-couple households, 15.2% were households with a male householder and no spouse or partner present, and 24.2% were households with a female householder and no spouse or partner present. About 28.8% of all households were made up of individuals and 14.7% had someone living alone who was 65 years of age or older.

There were 14,983 housing units, of which 74.4% were vacant. The homeowner vacancy rate was 4.0% and the rental vacancy rate was 80.9%.

Racial composition as of the 2020 census
Race	Number	Percent
White	7,071	88.4%
Black or African American	101	1.3%
American Indian and Alaska Native	25	0.3%
Asian	164	2.0%
Native Hawaiian and Other Pacific Islander	1	0.0%
Some other race	171	2.1%
Two or more races	469	5.9%
Hispanic or Latino (of any race)	427	5.3%

=== Demographic estimates ===
According to Census Bureau QuickFacts, the population per square mile in 2020 was 1,139.6, there were 2.06 persons per household, 3.1% of residents were under age 5, 52.0% were female, 11.4% were foreign-born, and there were 875 veterans living in the community.

=== Households and housing ===
The median value of owner-occupied housing units was $434,300. The median selected monthly owner costs with a mortgage was $2,322 and $791 for owners without a mortgage. The median gross rent was $1,565. 98.8% of households had a computer and 90.4% had a broadband internet subscription.

=== Income and poverty ===
The median household income was $75,347, the per capita income was $56,876, and 5.4% of the population lived below the poverty threshold.

=== Education ===
98.4% of the population aged 25 and older had a high school diploma, and 53.6% had a bachelor's degree or higher.

== Notable residents ==
- Ross Kenseth, former racing driver
