= Kensett =

Kensett may refer to:

- John Frederick Kensett (1816–1872), American artist and engraver
- Thomas Kensett (1786–1829), American engraver
- Kensett, Arkansas, United States
- Kensett, Iowa, United States

== See also ==
- Kensett Township (disambiguation)
