= Kensett Township =

Kensett Township may refer to:

- Kensett Township, White County, Arkansas, in White County, Arkansas
- Kensett Township, Worth County, Iowa
