= Ross Kenseth =

American stock car racing driver

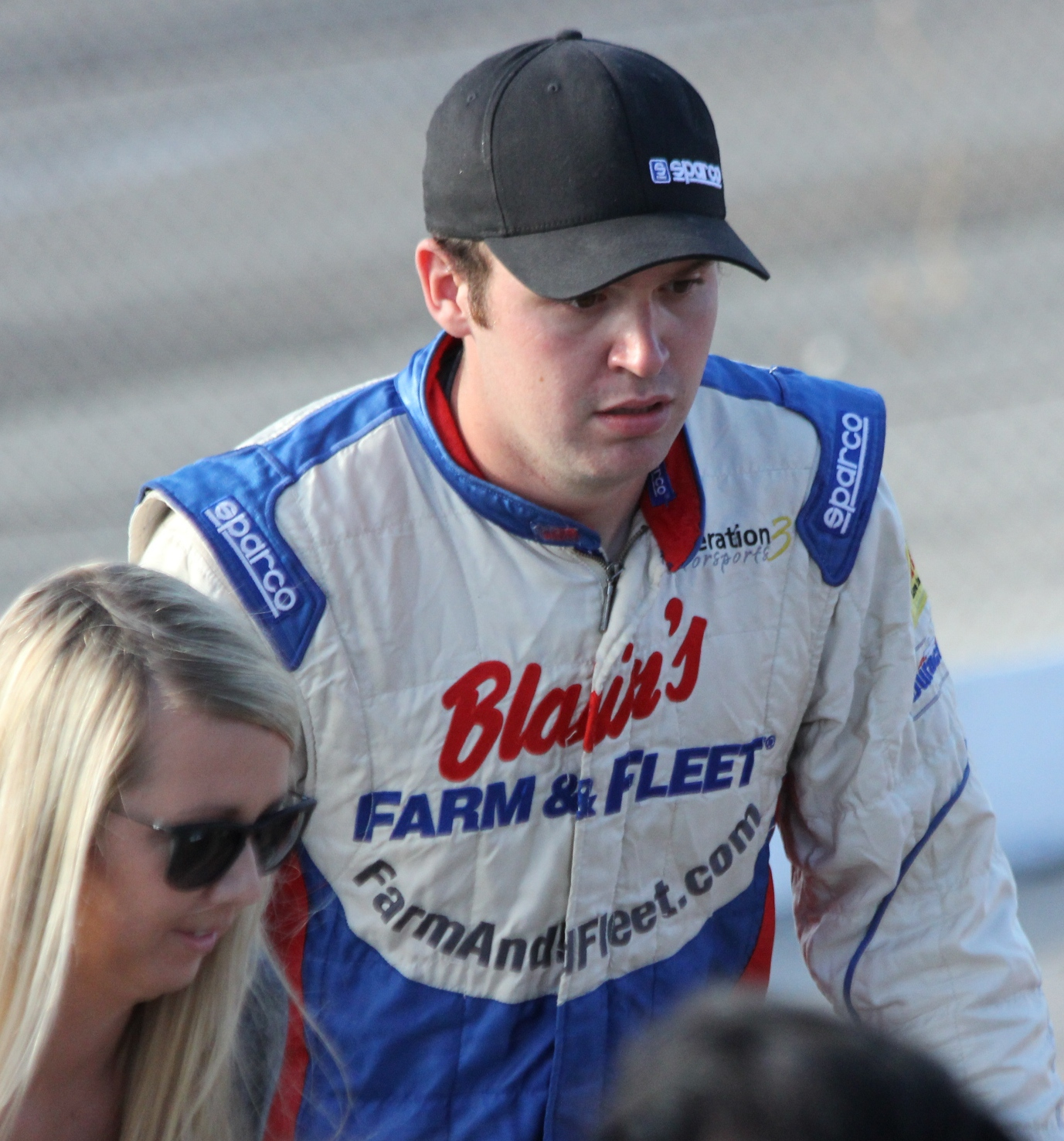
- Kenseth at Wisconsin International Raceway on August 4, 2015
- Born: Ross Joseph Kenseth; May 25, 1993 (age 33); Appleton, Wisconsin, U.S.
- Achievements: 2009 Big 8 Late Model Series Champion; 2011 Red, White, and Blue State Championship Series Champion; 2012 All American 400 Winner; 2012 Winchester 400 Winner; 2012 Redbud 400 Winner
- Awards: 2010 ARCA Midwest Tour Rookie of the Year; 2008 Big 8 Late Model Series Rookie of the Year

NASCAR O'Reilly Auto Parts Series career
- 2 races run over 1 year
- 2015 position: 54th
- Best finish: 54th (2015)
- First race: 2015 Owens Corning AttiCat 300 (Joliet)
- Last race: 2015 DAV 200 (Phoenix)
Wins	Top tens	Poles
0	1	0

NASCAR FedEx Freight Truck Series career
- 1 race run over 1 year
- 2015 position: 100th
- Best finish: 100th (2015)
- First race: 2015 Kroger 200 (Martinsville)
Wins	Top tens	Poles
0	0	0

ARCA Menards Series career
- 4 races run over 3 years
- Best finish: 51st (2015)
- First race: 2013 Herr's Live Life With Flavor 200 (Madison)
- Last race: 2015 Crosley Brands 150 (Kentucky)
- First win: 2015 Corrigan Oil Co. 250 (Michigan)
Wins	Top tens	Poles
1	4	0
- Statistics up to date as of June 18, 2026.

Ross Joseph Kenseth (born May 25, 1993) is an American stock car racing driver who currently competes part-time in the Blizzard Series. He is the son of 2003 NASCAR Winston Cup Series champion Matt Kenseth. He has formerly competed part-time in the NASCAR O'Reilly Auto Parts Series and NASCAR Craftsman Truck Series, and ARCA Menards Series.

== Early life ==
Born in Appleton, Wisconsin, Kenseth attended college at Clemson University. He is the first child and only son of Matt Kenseth. He has four younger half-sisters from his father’s marriage.

In late 2015, Kenseth announced his engagement to Amber Odom. After moving on from racing, Kenseth became an accountant, moved to Miramar Beach, Florida with Odom, and had a daughter and a son with her.

== Racing career ==
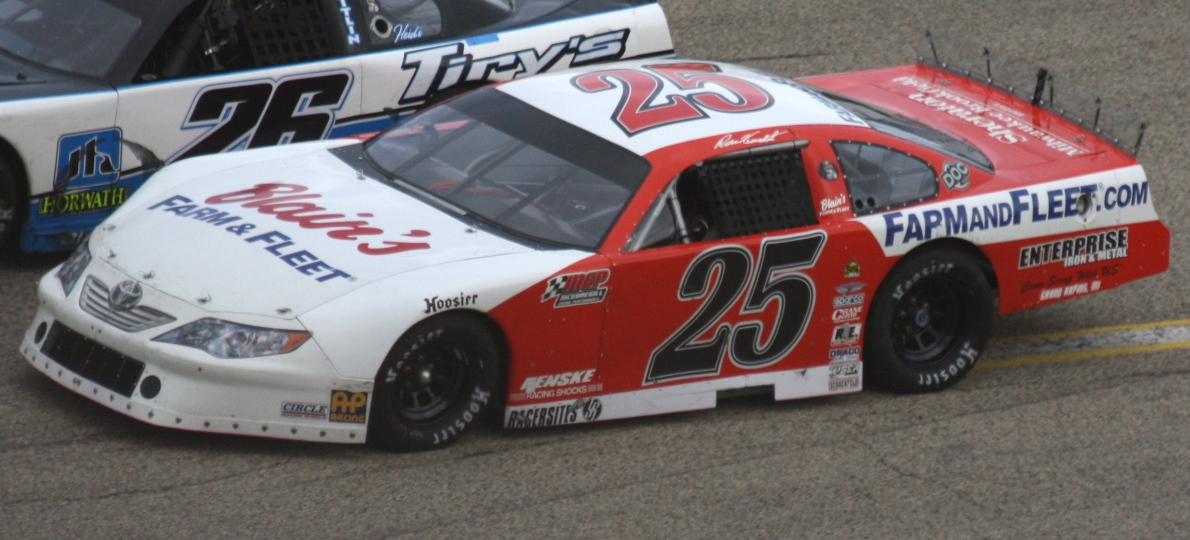
Kenseth racing in the 2013 Slinger Nationals

Kenseth raced primarily in his native Wisconsin and elsewhere in the Midwest early in his career. He began by racing for one season in a legends car before moved up into late models at Columbus 151 Speedway as a 14-year-old. He won the 2009 Big 8 Late Model Series championship by leading the entire final race at LaCrosse Fairgrounds Speedway's Oktoberfest 48 race. The series tours Wisconsin and northern Illinois. It was his fifth race win that season and seventh overall in the series. Kenseth qualified the second fastest for the Snowball Derby in December 2009. In 2011, Kenseth finished first in the Red, White and Blue State Championship at Wisconsin International Raceway. In 2012, Kenseth won the Winchester 400 at Winchester Speedway and the All American 400 at Nashville Fairgrounds Speedway.

Before the start of the 2013 racing season, Kyle Busch offered Kenseth a ride in the NASCAR Camping World Truck Series for that year, but no deal was reached. Kenseth made his debut in the ARCA Racing Series in August 2013, driving at Madison International Speedway in a car owned by Ken Schrader. Kenseth won the pole for the event, and finished sixth in the race.

Kenseth competed in the CRA Super Series in 2014, driving for Boyne Machine Racing; he took the year off from his studies at Clemson and moved to Michigan to be closer to the team. In September, Kenseth announced that he would make his superspeedway debut in the ARCA season finale at Kansas Speedway in October.

On April 17, 2015, Joe Gibbs Racing announced that Kenseth would make his NASCAR Xfinity Series debut at Chicagoland Speedway on June 20. Rain forced the race to be postponed by one day; Kenseth qualified second-fastest, led the opening lap, and finished in sixth place in his first NASCAR-sanctioned event. On October 20, Kenseth joined Hattori Racing Enterprises for his Camping World Truck Series debut at Martinsville Speedway, where he finished 17th.

Kenseth got back behind the wheel in 2020, driving a Blizzard Series race at Five Flags Speedway.

== Personal life ==
Kenseth ended his racing career in 2016 and became an accountant for a real estate firm in Miramar Beach, Florida.

== Motorsports career results ==
=== NASCAR ===
(key) (Bold – Pole position awarded by qualifying time. Italics – Pole position earned by points standings or practice time. * – Most laps led.)

==== Xfinity Series ====
NASCAR Xfinity Series results
Year	Team	No.	Make	1	2	3	4	5	6	7	8	9	10	11	12	13	14	15	16	17	18	19	20	21	22	23	24	25	26	27	28	29	30	31	32	33	NXSC	Pts	Ref
2015	Joe Gibbs Racing	20	Toyota	DAY	ATL	LVS	PHO	CAL	TEX	BRI	RCH	TAL	IOW	CLT	DOV	MCH	CHI; 6	DAY	KEN	NHA	IND	IOW	GLN	MOH	BRI	ROA	DAR	RCH	CHI	KEN	DOV	CLT	KAN	TEX			54th	50	
2015	Hattori Racing Enterprises	80	Toyota																																PHO; 33	HOM	54th	50	

==== Camping World Truck Series ====
NASCAR Camping World Truck Series results
Year	Team	No.	Make	1	2	3	4	5	6	7	8	9	10	11	12	13	14	15	16	17	18	19	20	21	22	23	NCWTC	Pts	Ref
2015	Hattori Racing Enterprises	18	Toyota	DAY	ATL	MAR	KAN	CLT	DOV	TEX	GTW	IOW	KEN	ELD	POC	MCH	BRI	MSP	CHI	NHA	LVS	TAL	MAR; 17	TEX	PHO	HOM; DNQ	100th	0^{1}	

^{*} Season still in progress
^{1} Ineligible for series points

=== ARCA Racing Series ===
(key) (Bold – Pole position awarded by qualifying time. Italics – Pole position earned by points standings or practice time. * – Most laps led.)

ARCA Racing Series results
Year	Team	No.	Make	1	2	3	4	5	6	7	8	9	10	11	12	13	14	15	16	17	18	19	20	21	ARSC	Pts	Ref
2013	Ken Schrader Racing	52	Chevy	DAY	MOB	SLM	TAL	TOL	ELK	POC	MCH	ROA	WIN	CHI	NJE	POC	BLN	ISF	MAD; 6	DSF	IOW	SLM	KEN	KAN	94th	220	
2014	RACE 101	3	Chevy	DAY	MOB	SLM	TAL	TOL	NJE	POC	MCH	ELK	WIN	CHI	IRP	POC	BLN	ISF	MAD	DSF	SLM	KEN	KAN; 3		76th	215	
2015	Ken Schrader Racing	52	Chevy	DAY	MOB	NSH	SLM	TAL	TOL	NJE	POC	MCH; 1*	CHI	WIN	IOW	IRP	POC	BLN	ISF	DSF	SLM	KEN; 4	KAN		51st	450	

=== CARS Super Late Model Tour ===
(key)

CARS Super Late Model Tour results
Year	Team	No.	Make	1	2	3	4	5	6	7	8	9	10	CSLMTC	Pts	Ref
2015	Matt Kenseth	25K	Ford	SNM	ROU	HCY	SNM; 6	TCM	MMS	ROU	CON	MYB	HCY	46th	26	
