= Tim Schendel =

American racing driver (born 1979)

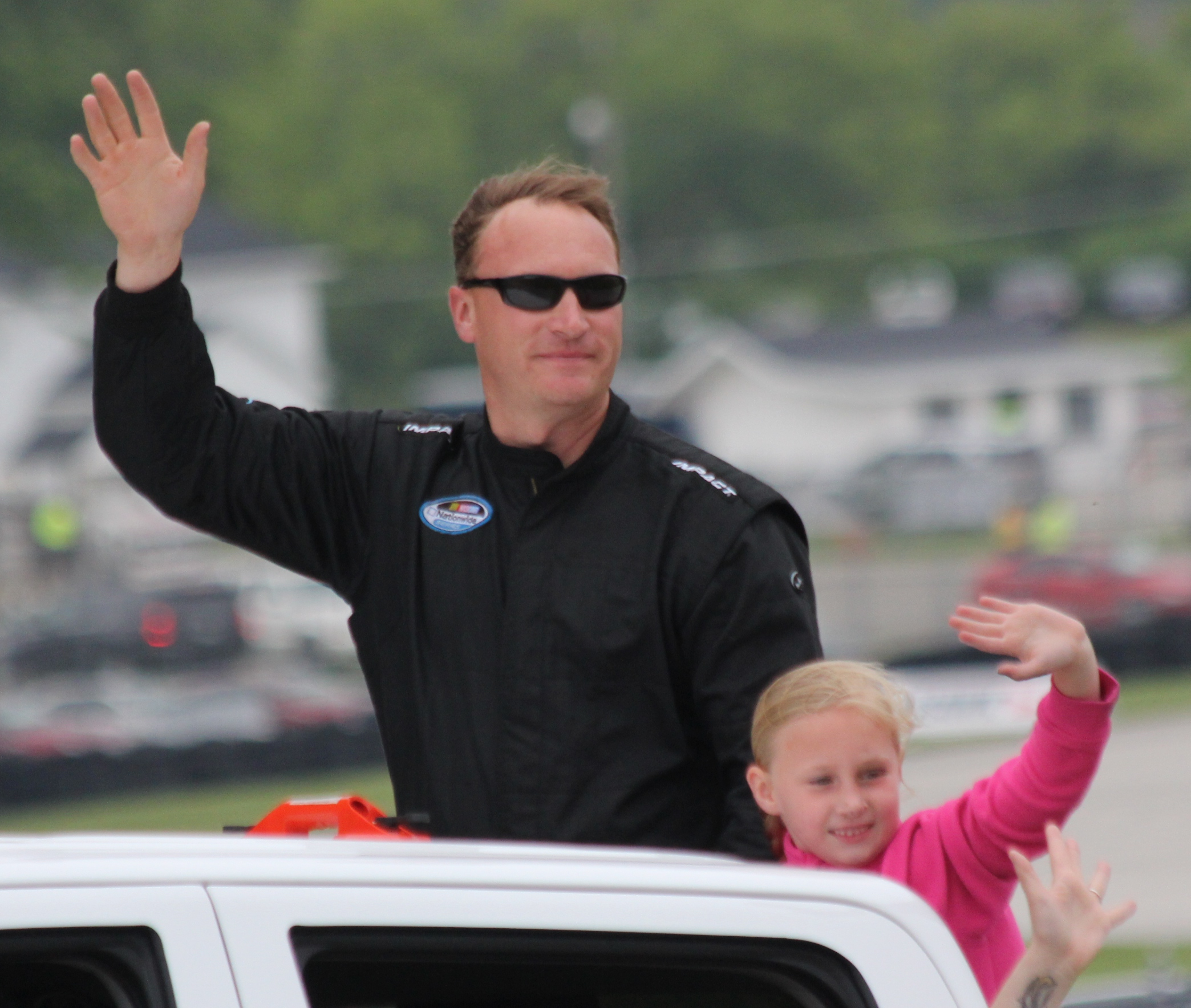
- Schendel at Road America in 2014
- Born: Timothy K. Schendel; May 10, 1979 (age 47); Sparta, Wisconsin, U.S.
- Achievements: 2006 NASCAR Midwest Tour Champion; 2006 Toyota All-Star Showdown Elite Division Winner

NASCAR O'Reilly Auto Parts Series career
- 24 races run over 6 years
- 2014 position: 73rd
- Best finish: 42nd (2012)
- First race: 2006 Sam's Town 250 (Memphis)
- Last race: 2014 Gardner Denver 200 (Road America)
| Wins | Top tens | Poles |
|---|---|---|
| 0 | 0 | 0 |

NASCAR FedEx Freight Truck Series career
- 3 races run over 2 years
- Best finish: 70th (2004)
- First race: 2004 Black Cat Fireworks 200 (Milwaukee)
- Last race: 2007 Power Stroke Diesel 200 (IRP)
| Wins | Top tens | Poles |
|---|---|---|
| 0 | 0 | 0 |
- Statistics up to date as of June 21, 2014.

Timothy K. Schendel (born May 10, 1979) is an American professional stock car racing driver. A past winner of the Toyota All-Star Showdown and champion of the NASCAR Midwest Tour, he has also competed in the NASCAR Nationwide Series and the ASA Midwest Tour.

== Career ==
Born in Sparta, Wisconsin on May 10, 1979, Schendel began competing in NASCAR-sanctioned competition in 2000, racing locally at the La Crosse Fairgrounds Speedway. After several years competing in the regional Elite Series, he won the 2006 NASCAR AutoZone Elite Division, Midwest Series championship, the final year the tour ran under NASCAR sanctioning.

The championship won Schendel a sport in the AutoZone Elite Division portion of the 2006 Toyota All-Star Showdown at Irwindale Speedway, where he won the all-star event, leading 112 of 130 laps in the event, which was extended in a green-white-checker finish from a scheduled 125 laps.

Following the closure of the NASCAR Midwest Series, Schendel has competed in the ASA Midwest Tour, which replaced it; his best finish in the series standings has been third in 2008. He also competed in selected races in the ARCA Racing Series and NASCAR Busch East Series in 2006 and 2007, as well as in three Craftsman Truck Series races in the mid-2000s. Schendel debuted in NASCAR in 2004 with two Craftsman Truck Series starts. He made his first start at the Milwaukee Mile in his home state track, starting 28th and finishing 22nd. After failing to qualify at Indianapolis Raceway Park, he made his second start at Homestead-Miami Speedway and finished 28th after crashing. Schendel made his first NASCAR Nationwide Series start in a 2006 start at Memphis. He completed 51 laps before an accident took him out of the race; he finished last.

In addition to competing in the ASA Midwest Tour, Schendel competed on a limited schedule in the NASCAR Nationwide Series, primarily driving the No. 52 Chevrolet for Jimmy Means Racing. He has a best finish of 24th, scored at O'Reilly Raceway Park in August 2011. He was known for blowing a tire right in front of the leaders Kyle Busch and Carl Edwards, whom Busch crashed in a NASCAR Nationwide race at Texas Motor Speedway. Schendel won the 2015 Super Late Model track championship at Dells Raceway Park in 2015.

== Images ==
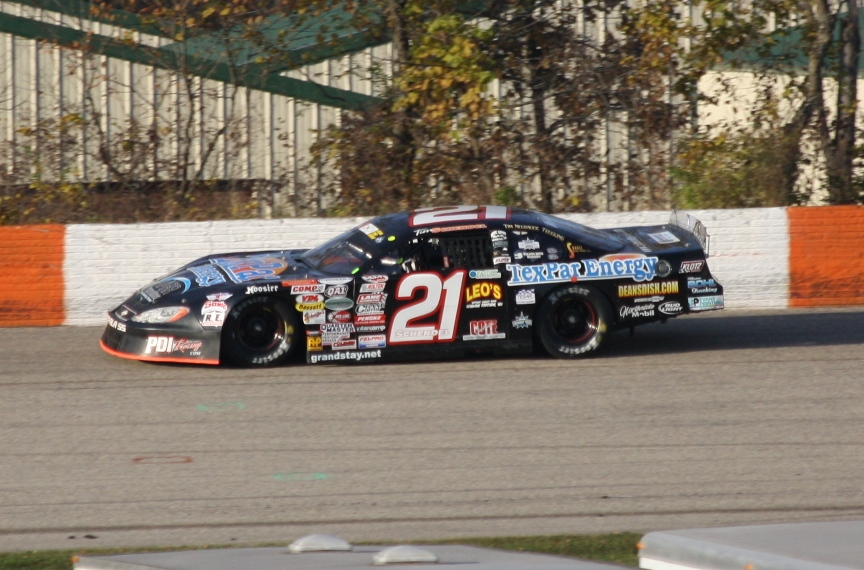
Schendel's 2010 ASA Midwest Tour car at La Crosse Fairgrounds Speedway

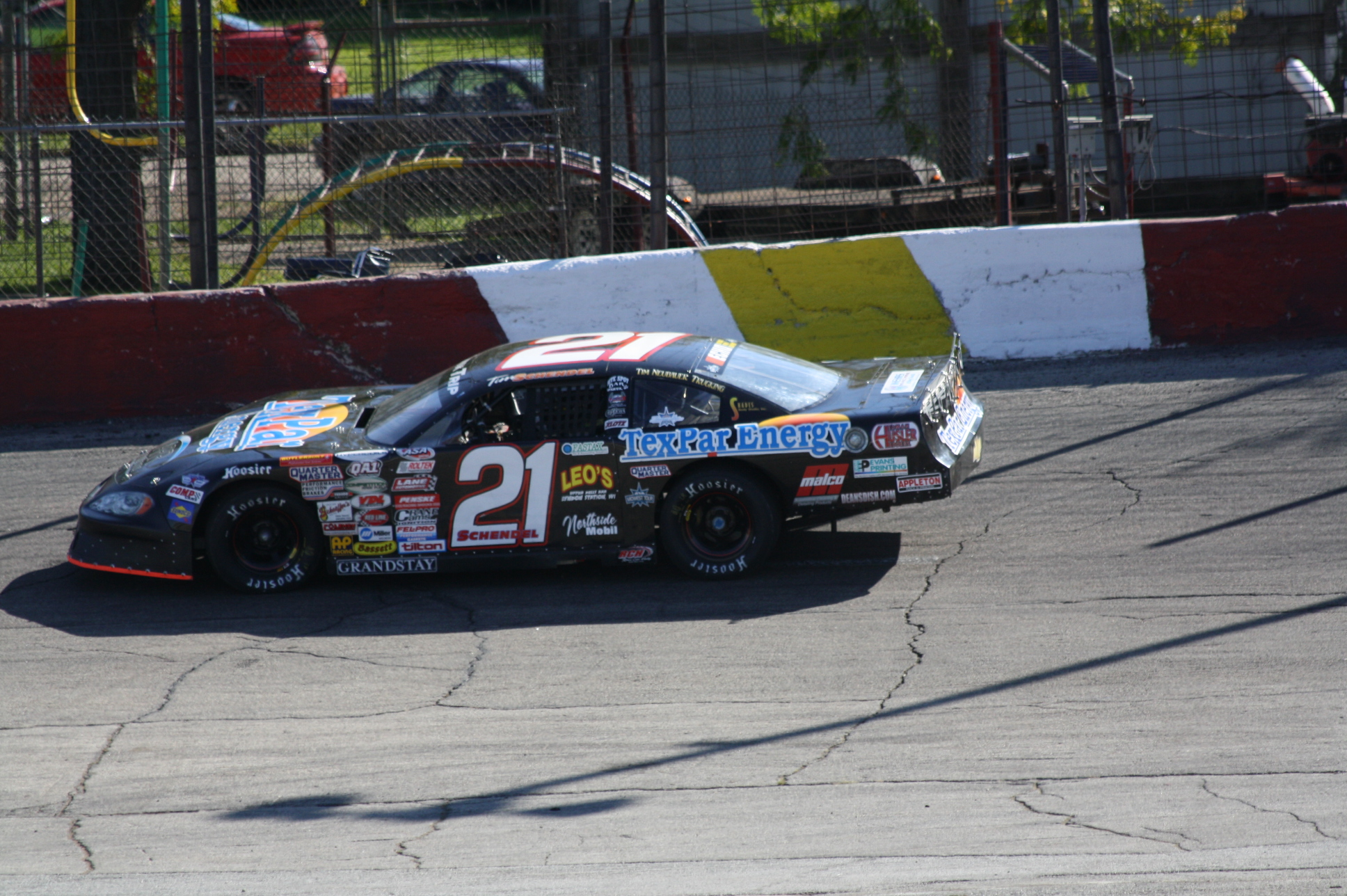
Schendel's 2011 ASA Midwest Tour car at Rockford Speedway

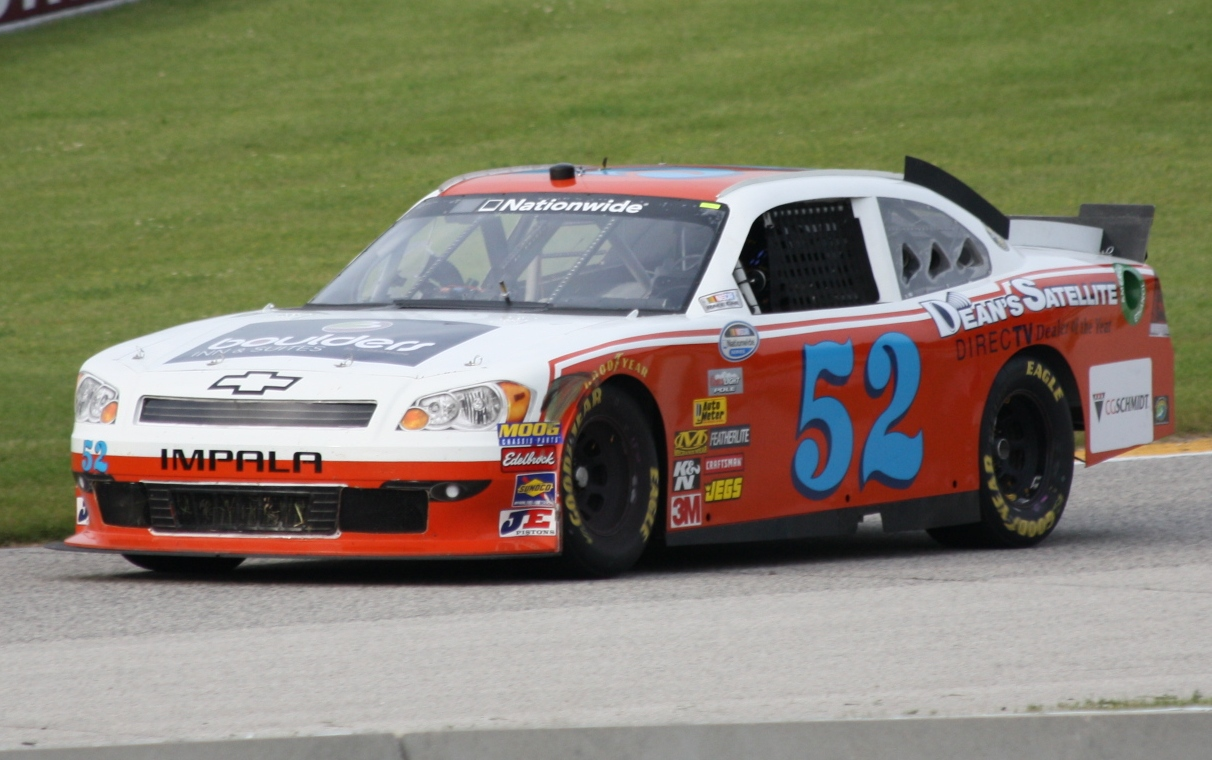
Schendel's 2011 Nationwide Series car at Road America

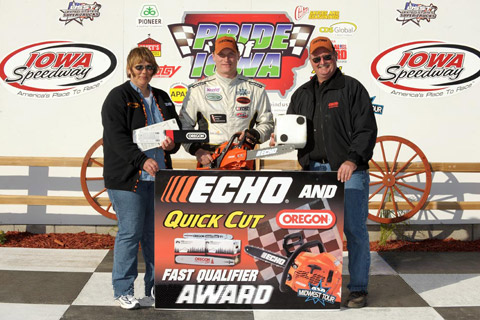
Fast time award for 2009 ASA Midwest Tour race at Iowa Speedway

== Motorsports career results ==
=== NASCAR ===
(key) (Bold – Pole position awarded by qualifying time. Italics – Pole position earned by points standings or practice time. * – Most laps led.)

==== Nationwide Series ====
NASCAR Nationwide Series results
| Year | Team | No. | Make | 1 | 2 | 3 | 4 | 5 | 6 | 7 | 8 | 9 | 10 | 11 | 12 | 13 | 14 | 15 | 16 | 17 | 18 | 19 | 20 | 21 | 22 | 23 | 24 | 25 | 26 | 27 | 28 | 29 | 30 | 31 | 32 | 33 | 34 | 35 | NNSC | Pts | Ref |
|---|---|---|---|---|---|---|---|---|---|---|---|---|---|---|---|---|---|---|---|---|---|---|---|---|---|---|---|---|---|---|---|---|---|---|---|---|---|---|---|---|---|
| 2006 | Mac Hill Motorsports | 56 | Chevy | DAY | CAL | MXC | LVS | ATL | BRI | TEX | NSH | PHO | TAL | RCH | DAR | CLT | DOV | NSH | KEN | MLW | DAY | CHI | NHA | MAR | GTY | IRP | GLN | MCH | BRI | CAL | RCH | DOV | KAN | CLT | MEM; 43 | TEX | PHO | HOM | 150th | 34 | |
| 2010 | Means Racing | 52 | Chevy | DAY | CAL | LVS | BRI | NSH; DNQ | PHO | TEX | TAL | RCH | DAR | DOV | CLT | NSH | KEN | ROA | NHA | DAY | CHI | GTY | IRP | IOW; 40 | GLN | MCH | BRI | CGV | ATL | RCH | DOV | KAN | CAL | CLT | GTY; DNQ | TEX | PHO | HOM | 143rd | 43 | |
| 2011 | Means Motorsports | 52 | Chevy | DAY | PHO | LVS | BRI; 36 | CAL | TEX; 35 | TAL | NSH; 35 | RCH | DAR | DOV | | | | | ROA; 25 | DAY | KEN | NHA | NSH | IRP; 24 | IOW; 27 | GLN | CGV | BRI | ATL | RCH | CHI | DOV | KAN | CLT | TEX | PHO | HOM | | 45th | 84 | |
| 2011 | JD Motorsports | 0 | Chevy | | | | | | | | | | | | IOW; 42 | CLT | CHI | MCH | | | | | | | | | | | | | | | | | | | | | 45th | 84 | |
| 2012 | Hamilton Means Racing | 52 | Chevy | DAY | PHO; 30 | LVS; 29 | BRI; 37 | CAL; 29 | TEX; 27 | RCH | TAL | DAR | | | | MCH; 35 | | | | | CHI; 33 | IND; 28 | | | | | | | | | | | | | | | | | 42nd | 113 | |
| 2012 | The Motorsports Group | 47 | Chevy | | | | | | | | | | IOW; 42 | CLT | DOV | | | | | | | | | | | | | | | | | | | | | | | | 42nd | 113 | |
| 2012 | The Motorsports Group | 42 | Chevy | | | | | | | | | | | | | | ROA; 42 | KEN | DAY | NHA | | | IOW; 39 | GLN | CGV | BRI | ATL | RCH | CHI | KEN | DOV | CLT | KAN | TEX | PHO | HOM | | | 42nd | 113 | |
| 2013 | Hamilton Means Racing | 52 | Chevy | DAY | PHO | LVS | BRI | CAL | TEX | RCH | TAL | DAR | CLT | DOV | IOW; 33 | MCH | ROA | KEN | DAY | NHA | | | | | | | | | | | | | | | | | | | 83rd | 11 | |
| 2013 | The Motorsports Group | 46 | Chevy | | | | | | | | | | | | | | | | | | CHI; DNQ | IND | IOW | GLN | MOH | BRI | ATL | RCH | CHI | KEN | DOV | KAN | CLT | TEX | PHO | HOM | | | 83rd | 11 | |
| 2014 | JD Motorsports | 87 | Chevy | DAY | PHO | LVS | BRI | CAL | TEX | DAR | RCH | TAL | IOW; 34 | CLT | DOV | | | | | | | | | | | | | | | | | | | | | | | | 73rd | 14 | |
| 2014 | Rick Ware Racing | 87 | Chevy | | | | | | | | | | | | | MCH; 40 | | | | | | | | | | | | | | | | | | | | | | | 73rd | 14 | |
| 2014 | Jimmy Means Racing | 79 | Chevy | | | | | | | | | | | | | | ROA; 37 | KEN | DAY | NHA | CHI | IND | IOW | GLN | MOH | BRI | ATL | RCH | CHI | KEN | DOV | KAN | CLT | TEX | PHO | HOM | | | 73rd | 14 | |

==== Craftsman Truck Series ====
NASCAR Craftsman Truck Series results
| Year | Team | No. | Make | 1 | 2 | 3 | 4 | 5 | 6 | 7 | 8 | 9 | 10 | 11 | 12 | 13 | 14 | 15 | 16 | 17 | 18 | 19 | 20 | 21 | 22 | 23 | 24 | 25 | NCTC | Pts | Ref |
|---|---|---|---|---|---|---|---|---|---|---|---|---|---|---|---|---|---|---|---|---|---|---|---|---|---|---|---|---|---|---|---|
| 2004 | Brevak Racing | 31 | Dodge | DAY | ATL | MAR | MFD | CLT | DOV | TEX | MEM | MLW; 22 | KAN | KEN | GTW | MCH | IRP; DNQ | NSH | BRI | RCH | NHA | LVS | CAL | TEX | MAR | PHO | DAR | | 70th | 164 | |
| 2004 | Curb-Agajanian Motorsports | 43 | Chevy | | | | | | | | | | | | | | | | | | | | | | | | | HOM; 32 | 70th | 164 | |
| 2007 | Brevak Racing | 31 | Chevy | DAY | CAL | ATL | MAR | KAN | CLT | MFD | DOV | TEX | MCH | MLW | MEM | KEN | IRP; 35 | NSH | BRI | GTW | NHA | LVS | TAL | MAR | ATL | TEX | | | 111th | 58 | |
| 2007 | Brevak Racing | 31 | Dodge | | | | | | | | | | | | | | | | | | | | | | | | PHO; DNQ | HOM; DNQ | 111th | 58 | |

^{*} Season still in progress
^{1} Ineligible for series points

Sporting positions
| Preceded by Justin Diercks | NASCAR AutoZone Elite Division, Midwest Series Champion; 2006 | Succeeded by Nathan Haseleu (ASA Midwest Tour) |
