= Elko, Minnesota =

Former neighborhood in United States

Elko New Market
- Neighborhood
- Location of Elko, Minnesota
- Coordinates: 44°34′7″N 93°19′24″W
- Country: United States
- State: Minnesota
- County: Scott

Area
  - Total: 1.4 sq mi (3.5 km^{2})
  - Land: 1.4 sq mi (3.5 km^{2})
  - Water: 0 sq mi (0.0 km^{2})
- Elevation: 1,142 ft (348 m)

Population (2000)
  - Total: 472
  - Density: 347/sq mi (133.9/km^{2})
- Time zone: UTC-6 (Central (CST))
  - Summer (DST): UTC-5 (CDT)
- ZIP code: 55020
- Area code: 952
- FIPS code: 27-18656
- GNIS feature ID: 0643269

Elko was a city in Scott County, Minnesota, United States. The population was 472 at the 2000 census. In January 2007, Elko merged with New Market to become Elko New Market.

== Geography ==
According to the United States Census Bureau, the city had a total area of 1.4 square miles (3.6 km^{2}), all of it land.

== Demographics ==
As of the census of 2000, there were 472 people, 155 households, and 128 families residing in the city. The population density was 346.8 inhabitants per square mile (133.9/km^{2}). There were 165 housing units at an average density of 121.2 per square mile (46.8/km^{2}). The racial makeup of the city was 98.94% White, 0.21% African American, 0.21% Native American, 0.42% Asian, 0.21% from other races. Hispanic or Latino of any race were 0.42% of the population.

There were 155 households, out of which 52.3% had children under the age of 18 living with them, 72.3% were married couples living together, 5.2% had a female householder with no husband present, and 16.8% were non-families. 12.9% of all households were made up of individuals, and 3.2% had someone living alone who was 65 years of age or older. The average household size was 3.05 and the average family size was 3.33.

In the city the population was spread out, with 35.2% under the age of 18, 5.1% from 18 to 24, 43.6% from 25 to 44, 12.9% from 45 to 64, and 3.2% who were 65 years of age or older. The median age was 31 years. For every 100 females, there were 111.7 males. For every 100 females age 18 and over, there were 109.6 males.

The median income for a household in the city was $67,625, and the median income for a family was $70,625. Males had a median income of $41,324 versus $31,250 for females. The per capita income for the city was $21,827. None of the families and 1.2% of the population were living below the poverty line, including no under eighteens and 26.7% of those over 64.
