= Chris Wimmer =

American racing driver (born 1979)

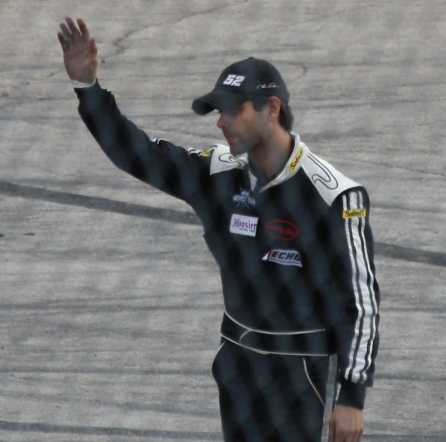
- Wimmer in 2010
- Born: June 23, 1979 (age 47); Wausau, Wisconsin, U.S.
- Achievements: 2014 Slinger Nationals Winner

NASCAR O'Reilly Auto Parts Series career
- 4 races run over 2 years
- 2006 position: 106th
- Best finish: 106th (2006)
- First race: 2005 Arizona 200 (Phoenix)
- Last race: 2006 Dover 200 (Dover)
Wins	Top tens	Poles
0	0	0

NASCAR FedEx Freight Truck Series career
- 21 races run over 4 years
- 2007 position: 100th
- Best finish: 31st (2004)
- First race: 2004 UAW/GM Ohio 250 (Mansfield)
- Last race: 2007 Sam's Town 400 (Texas)
Wins	Top tens	Poles
0	0	0
- Statistics up to date as of July 2, 2012.

Chris Wimmer (born June 23, 1979) is an American professional stock car racing driver. He has raced mostly in short track competition and as high as the NASCAR Busch Series (now O'Reilly Auto Parts Series). Wimmer competed in the ASA Midwest Tour (now ARCA Midwest Tour) where he finished as high as second in his final season (2013). He has run a more limited schedule of touring events since.

== Early career ==
Wimmer's career began in his youth, when he began working on his uncle, Larry Detjens' race car. Detjens was a champion late model racer who competed at Slinger Super Speedway and Wisconsin International Raceway. Detjens had the Slinger Nationals race trophy named after him after his death in 1981. Wimmer would work on his brother Scott Wimmer's cars after Scott started racing at the age of 14.

Wimmer began his racing career at the age of 17 while still in high school, racing pure stocks. He won the pure stocks track championship at State Park Speedway near Wausau in 1997. Later, he moved over to late models, and he won State Park Speedway's Larry Detjens Memorial Race in 2001. Participating in 149 races, Wimmer won 17 times and had 53 top five finishes. In 2001, he moved up to the American Speed Association (ASA), competing in more than 50 events over the next three years.

== NASCAR career ==
On January 9, 2004, Wimmer signed to drive for MB Motorsports in the Craftsman Truck Series. Piloting the No. 63 Dave Porter Truck Sales Ford, Wimmer debuted at Mansfield Motorsports Speedway in early April. In the season he competed in twelve races; his best finish was 18th at Kansas Speedway. The following season, he was left without a ride before coming to an agreement with Green Light Racing in June 2005. He raced the No. 07 Chevrolet at the Milwaukee Mile. He would go on to race five more events for the team, occasionally switching to the No. 08 Chevy (which was unsponsored) and back to the No. 07, which had different sponsors in all four races Wimmer drove it. His best finish was 17th.

Despite having only run in 17 Craftsman Truck races, Wimmer came to a three-year agreement with Keith Coleman Racing in early November 2005 to drive the No. 23 Chevrolet Monte Carlo in the Busch Series. He raced once in the 2005 season at Phoenix International Raceway and finished 37th after crashing. In 2006, Wimmer tried to compete for Busch Series Rookie of the Year, but after missing many races, he was released. He returned to the Truck Series to drive the No. 08 truck for Green Light at Milwaukee, but finished last after an electrical failure. Later in the season, he made one race at Dover International Speedway, finishing 43rd in the No. 79 Speedco Chevy. His final race of the year came at Texas Motor Speedway, when he drove the No. 76 Automotive Fabrication Chevy for Jeff Milburn to a 34th-place finish.

In 2007, Wimmer drove one more race for Milburn at Texas, where he finished 30th after an engine failure.

== Post-NASCAR career ==
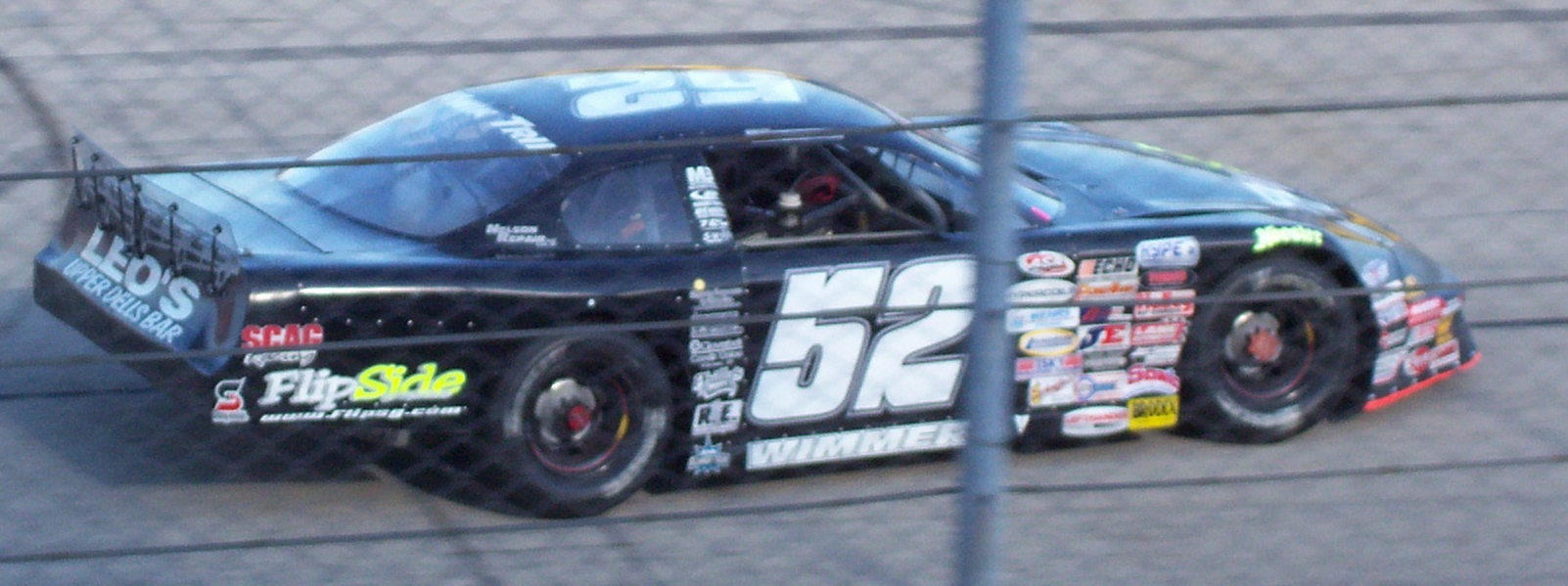
Wimmer's 2008 ASA car

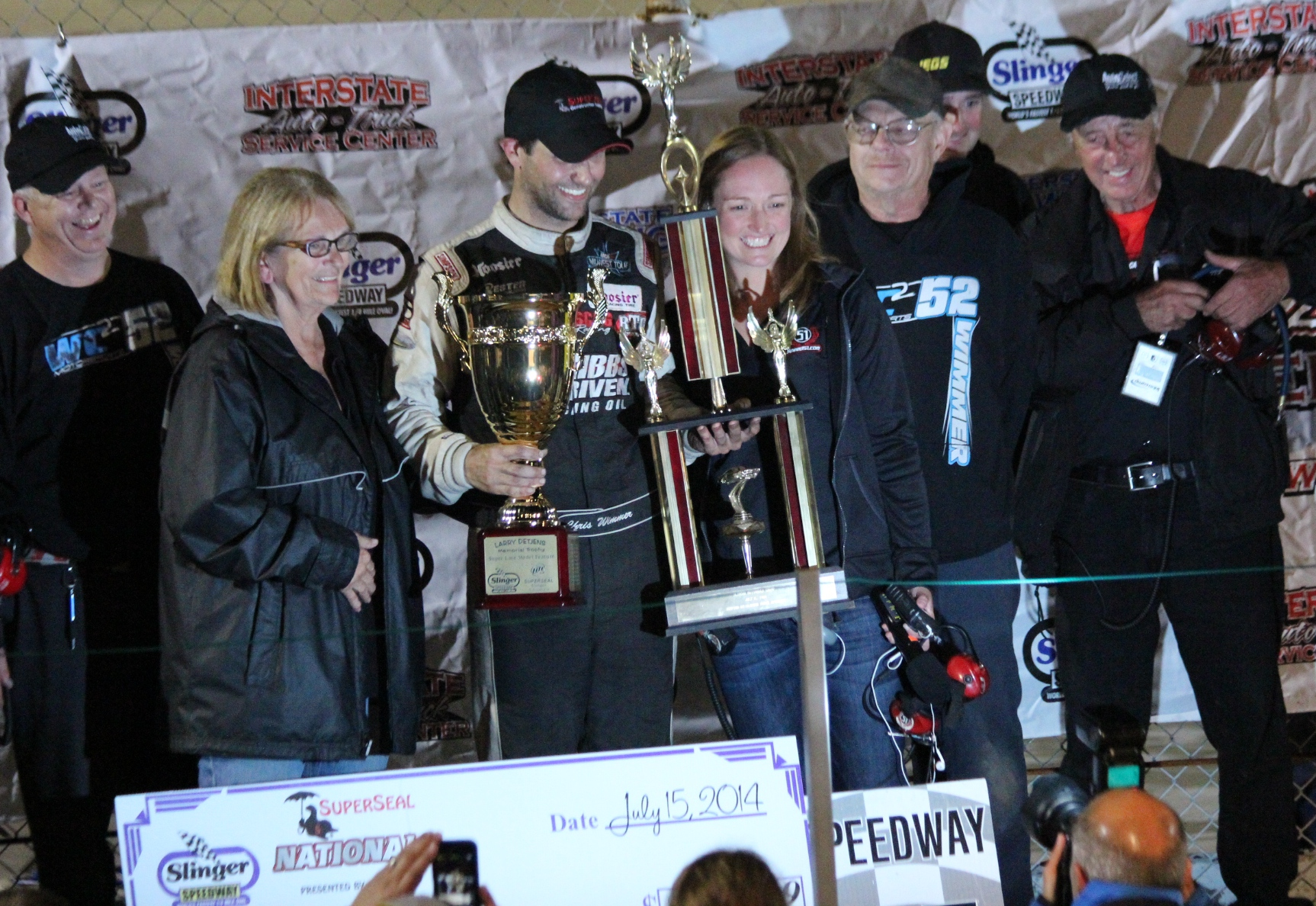
Wimmer with his crew after winning the 2014 Slinger Nationals

In 2008, Wimmer began competing on the ASA Midwest Tour, finishing fourth in the season points. He had nine top-ten finishes and was the fastest qualifier in two of 14 events. He was the only driver in the top-five in points to have no wins.

Wimmer operated State Park Speedway along with his father. He raced on the ASA series, continuing after it was renamed as the ARCA Midwest Tour, and finished second in series points in 2013. He has also raced in events at State Park Speedway and other area tracks such as Marshfield Motor Speedway and Golden Sands Speedway. Wimmer competed in the 2014 Slinger Nationals. He raced up to second behind Dennis Prunty and took the lead late in the race when Prunty's car stopped running. Wimmer held off a late charge by Matt Kenseth to take the win. He won the final race in a three-race super late model Challenge Series at Madison International Speedway to take the track championship.

In May 2015, Wimmer took over as crew chief for Harrison Burton's Super Late Model replacing Freddie Query. Burton is the son of Jeff Burton.

== Motorsports career results ==
=== NASCAR ===
(key) (Bold – Pole position awarded by qualifying time. Italics – Pole position earned by points standings or practice time. * – Most laps led.)

==== Busch Series ====
NASCAR Busch Series results
Year	Team	No.	Make	1	2	3	4	5	6	7	8	9	10	11	12	13	14	15	16	17	18	19	20	21	22	23	24	25	26	27	28	29	30	31	32	33	34	35	NBSC	Pts	Ref
2005	Keith Coleman Racing	23	Chevy	DAY	CAL	MXC	LVS	ATL	NSH	BRI	TEX	PHO	TAL	DAR	RCH	CLT	DOV	NSH	KEN	MLW	DAY	CHI	NHA	PPR	GTY	IRP	GLN	MCH	BRI	CAL	RCH	DOV	KAN	CLT	MEM	TEX; DNQ	PHO; 37	HOM; DNQ	136th	52	
2006	Keith Coleman Racing	23	Chevy	DAY; DNQ	CAL; DNQ	MXC; DNQ	LVS; DNQ	ATL; DNQ	BRI; 39	TEX; DNQ	NSH; 40	PHO	TAL	RCH	DAR	CLT	DOV	NSH	KEN	MLW	DAY	CHI	NHA	MAR	GTY	IRP	GLN	MCH	BRI	CAL	RCH								106th	123	
2006	Odle Motorsports	79	Chevy																													DOV; 43	KAN	CLT					106th	123	
2006	Davis Motorsports	0	Chevy																																MEM; DNQ	TEX	PHO	HOM	106th	123	

==== Craftsman Truck Series ====
NASCAR Craftsman Truck Series results
Year	Team	No.	Make	1	2	3	4	5	6	7	8	9	10	11	12	13	14	15	16	17	18	19	20	21	22	23	24	25	NCTC	Pts	Ref
2004	MB Motorsports	63	Ford	DAY	ATL	MAR; DNQ	MFD; 36	CLT	DOV	TEX	MEM; 36	MLW; 20	KAN; 18	KEN; 21	GTW; 24	MCH	IRP; DNQ	NSH; 33	BRI; 25	RCH; 36	NHA	LVS; DNQ	CAL; 29	TEX; 27	MAR	PHO; 33	DAR	HOM	31st	942	
2005	Green Light Racing	07	Chevy	DAY	CAL	ATL	MAR	GTY	MFD	CLT	DOV	TEX	MCH	MLW; 22	KAN	KEN	MEM; 17	IRP		BRI; 35	RCH	NHA	LVS	MAR				HOM; 33	43rd	504	
2005	Green Light Racing	08	Chevy																NSH; 34						ATL; 17	TEX	PHO		43rd	504	
2006	Green Light Racing	08	Chevy	DAY	CAL	ATL	MAR	GTY	CLT	MFD	DOV	TEX	MCH	MLW; 36	KAN	KEN	MEM	IRP	NSH	BRI	NHA	LVS	TAL	MAR	ATL				73rd	116	
2006	Jeff Milburn Racing	76	Chevy																							TEX; 34	PHO	HOM	73rd	116	
2007	Jeff Milburn Racing	76	Chevy	DAY	CAL	ATL	MAR	KAN	CLT	MFD	DOV	TEX; 30	MCH	MLW	MEM	KEN	IRP	NSH	BRI	GTW	NHA	LVS; 36	TAL	MAR	ATL	TEX	PHO	HOM	98th	73	

=== ARCA Re/Max Series ===
(key) (Bold – Pole position awarded by qualifying time. Italics – Pole position earned by points standings or practice time. * – Most laps led.)

ARCA Re/Max Series results
Year	Team	No.	Make	1	2	3	4	5	6	7	8	9	10	11	12	13	14	15	16	17	18	19	20	21	22	23	ARSC	Pts	Ref
2003	Bill Davis Racing	22	Dodge	DAY	ATL	NSH	SLM	TOL	KEN	CLT	BLN	KAN	MCH	LER	POC	POC	NSH	ISF	WIN	DSF	CHI	SLM	TAL	CLT; DNQ	SBO		NA	0	
2007	Win-Tron Racing	32	Dodge	DAY	USA	NSH	SLM	KAN	WIN	KEN	TOL	IOW	POC	MCH; 33	BLN	KEN	POC	NSH	ISF	MIL	GTW	DSF	CHI	SLM	TAL	TOL	166th	65	
2008	Win-Tron Racing	32	Dodge	DAY	SLM	IOW	KEN	CAR	KEN	TOL	POC	MCH; 16	CAY	KEN	BLN	POC	NSH	ISF	DSF	CHI	SLM	NJE	TAL	TOL			113th	150	
