= Nathan Haseleu =

American racing driver (born 1977)

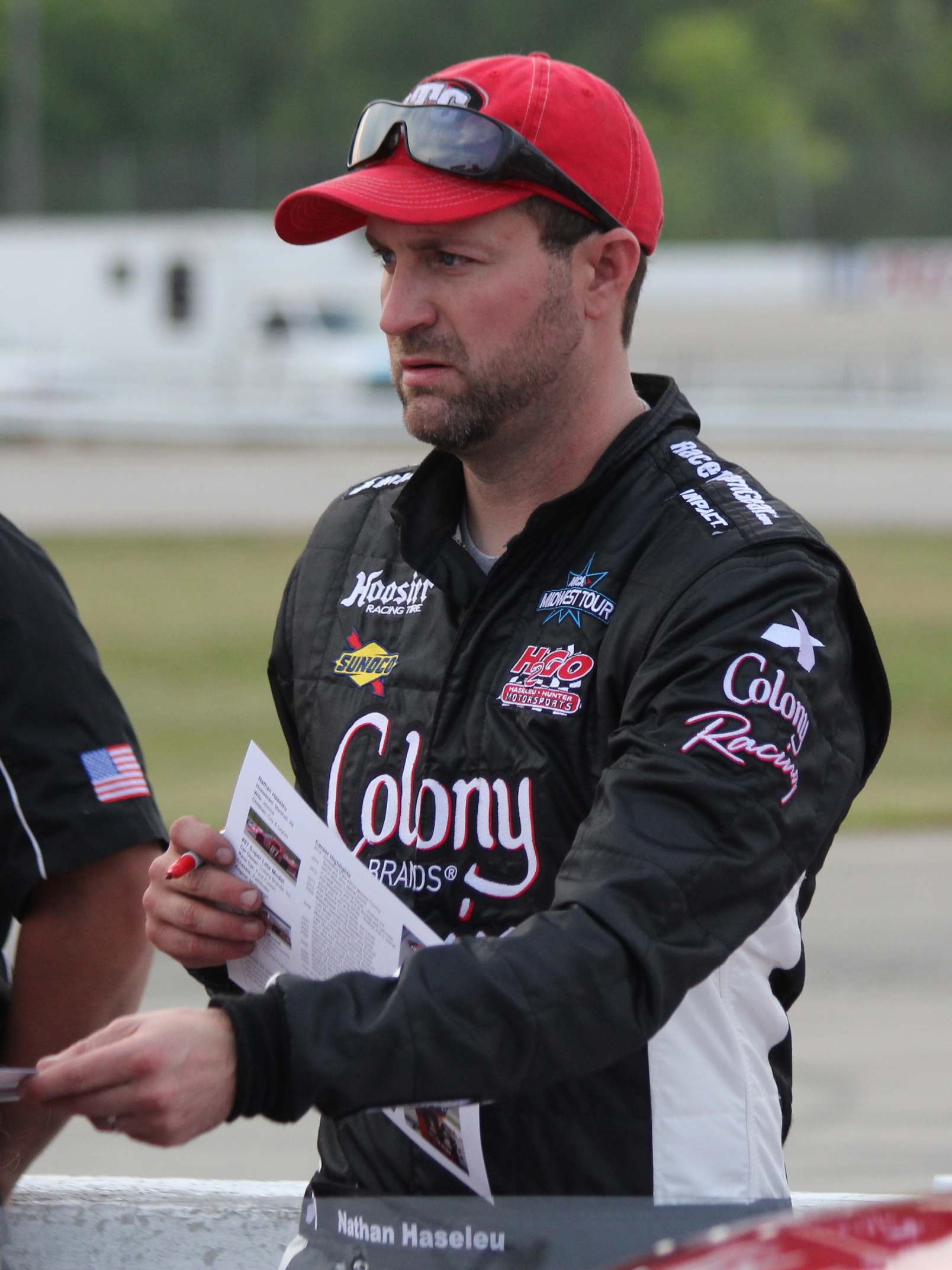
- Haseleu hands his autograph to a fan in 2014
- Born: November 24, 1977 (age 48); Sun Prairie, Wisconsin, U.S.
- Achievements: 2005, 2006, and 2007 Wisconsin Challenge Series Champion; 2007 ASA Midwest Tour Champion; 2005 Slinger Nationals Winner; 2013 Oktoberfest 100 Winner

NASCAR FedEx Freight Truck Series career
- 12 races run over 1 year
- Best finish: 10th (2001)
- First race: 2001 Florida Dodge Dealers 250 (Daytona)
- Last race: 2001 New England 200 (Loudon)
Wins	Top tens	Poles
0	4	0
- Statistics up to date as of July 6, 2012.

Nathan Haseleu (born November 24, 1977; pronounced HAWS-lie) is an American racecar driver from Sun Prairie, Wisconsin. His career peaked in the NASCAR Craftsman Truck Series with four Top 10 finishes for Roush Racing. Haseleu has also competed in the ASA Midwest Tour, the CRA Super Series, and the Wisconsin Challenge Series. He lives in Marshall, Dane County, Wisconsin.

== Racing career ==
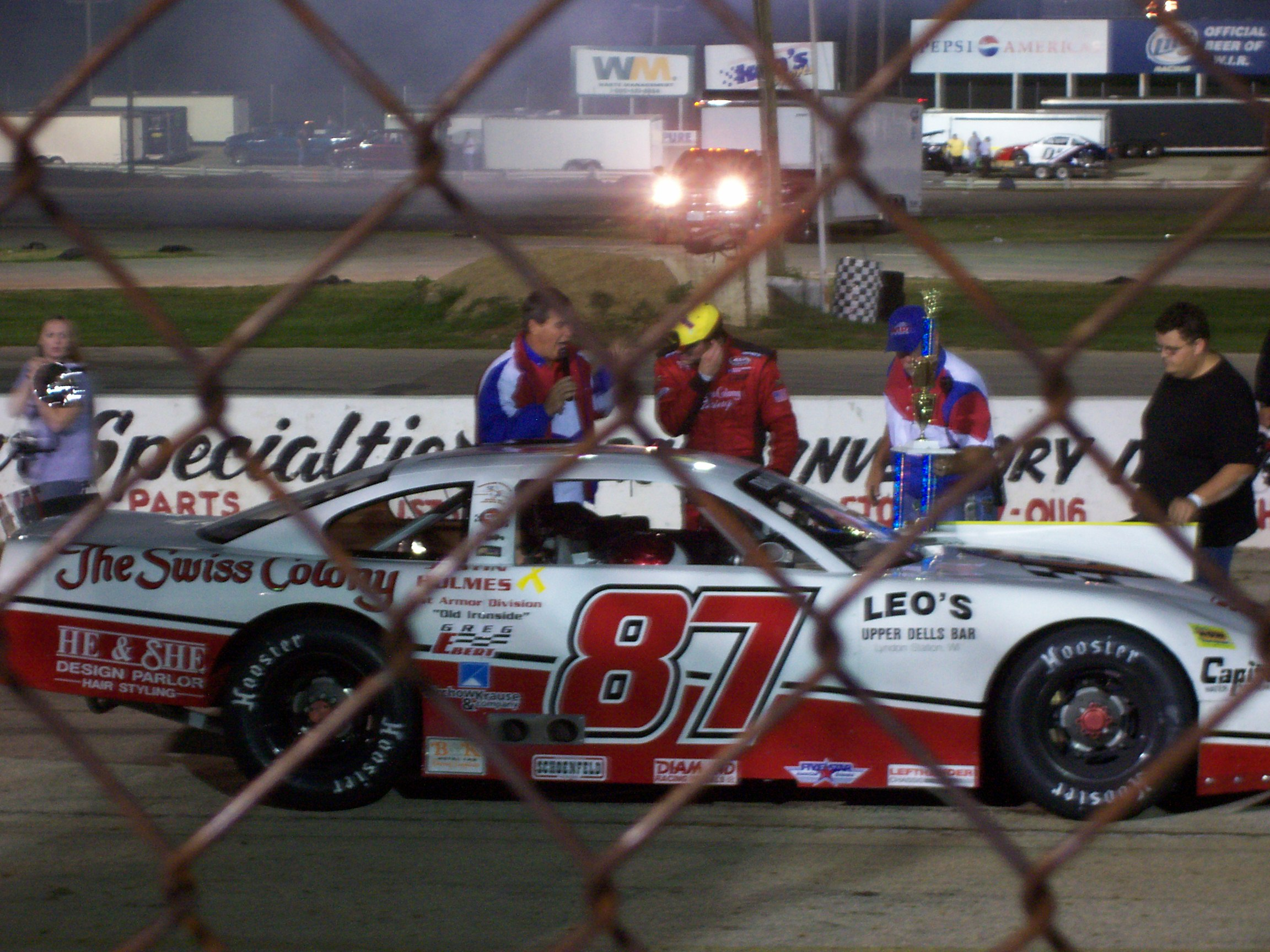
Haseleu after a feature win in 2006 at Wisconsin International Raceway

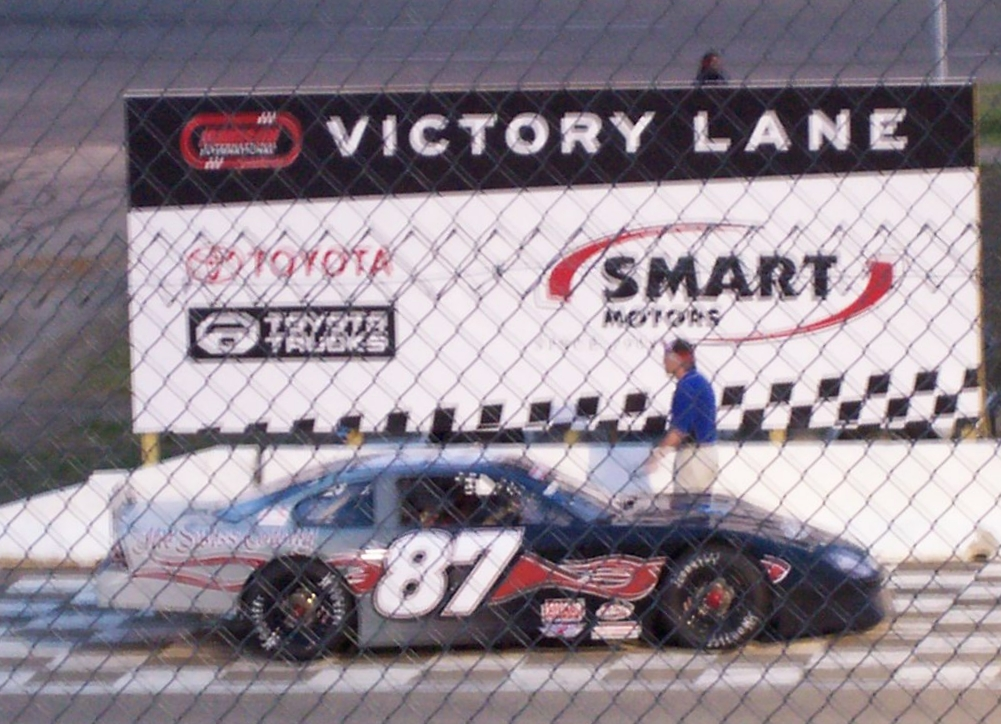
In victory lane after winning a super late model heat race at Madison International Speedway in 2007

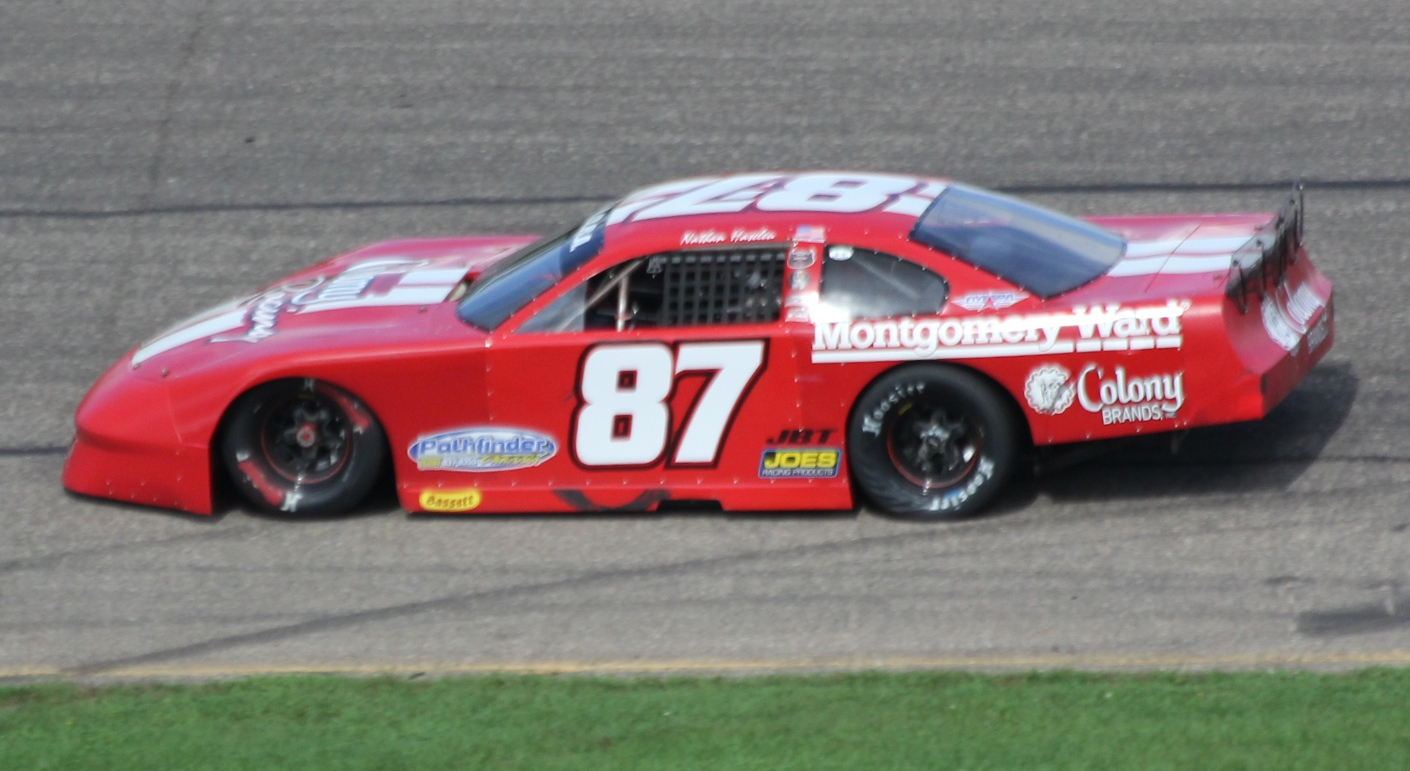
Haseleu racing at Golden Sands Speedway in 2015

Haseleu began racing in a hobby stock at age 16 in 1994 at Columbus 151 Speedway and Jefferson Speedway in Wisconsin, and he won the Rookie of the Year at both tracks plus the championship at Columbus 151. He won hobby stock track championships both tracks in 1995. Haseleu moved up to the (limited) late model division at Columbus 151 Speedway in 1996. He was the division Rookie of the Year, finished third in points, and won the Hard Charger of the Year award for passing the most cars in feature races. He won the track late model championship in 1997 and repeated as Hard Charger. He started traveling in 1998. He won his first super late model race at Madison International Speedway in his second super late model start. He also competed in four NASCAR RE/MAX Challenge Series races. In 1999, he had seven top-ten finishes in the RE/MAX Challenge Series, one pole, and two top-five finishes. Also in 1999, he won the Miller Classic race at Madison, and six super late model features at Dells Motor Speedway (now Dells Raceway Park). He competed in 17 super late model races in 2000, with nine wins and thirteen top-five finishes. He also had one win, one pole, seven top-fives, and ten top-ten finishes in the NASCAR Midwest Series (as the RE/MAX Challenge Series had been renamed).

Haseleu competed in twelve races in the NASCAR Craftsman Truck Series in 2001 for Roush Racing. He scored four Top 10 finishes before he was released halfway through the season due to poor performance. All four top-ten finishes were tenth-place finishes. He finished 24th in the final series points.

Haseleu returned to racing at Wisconsin short tracks. He competed in 33 super late model races in 2002, and won nine events. Three of the wins were in the Midwest All-Star Racing Series, and he finished second in the season points standings. Haseleu won two races at Madison in 2003, and had one win in ten starts at Madison in 2004. He was the 2005 champion of the Wisconsin Challenge Series with three wins. He also won five super late model features at Madison, and finished second in the season points despite missing two events. He won the 2005 Slinger Nationals at Slinger Super Speedway against numerous drivers with NASCAR experience. He won four straight races en route to winning the 2006 Wisconsin Challenge Series, including the series' events at the Milwaukee Mile and Wisconsin International Raceway. In 2007 he competed in the ASA Midwest Tour, the CRA Super Series, the Wisconsin Challenge Series (WCS), and occasional late model events. He won WCS races at Madison and Dells Raceway Park, and an ASA Midwest Tour race at Jefferson Speedway. He won the 2007 Wisconsin Challenge Series. He raced in the ASA Midwest Tour in 2008, finishing eighth in season points. In 14 events, he had eight Top 10 finishes and three Top 5s.

Haseleu has continued racing at Midwestern United States races, especially Wisconsin. He won the Oktoberfest 100 race at La Crosse Fairgrounds Speedway in 2013. Haseleu cut back to selected events in 2015 saying after an August win in the TUNDRA Super Late Model series at Golden Sands Speedway that he might stop racing after the season ends.

== Motorsports career results ==
=== NASCAR ===
(key) (Bold – Pole position awarded by qualifying time. Italics – Pole position earned by points standings or practice time. * – Most laps led.)

==== Craftsman Truck Series ====
NASCAR Craftsman Truck Series results
Year	Team	No.	Make	1	2	3	4	5	6	7	8	9	10	11	12	13	14	15	16	17	18	19	20	21	22	23	24	NCTC	Pts	Ref
2001	Roush Racing	99	Ford	DAY; 29	HOM; 14	MMR; 14	MAR; 10	GTY; 27	DAR; 10	PPR; 12	DOV; 21	TEX; 10	MEM	MLW	KAN; 10	KEN; 12	NHA; 13	IRP	NSH	CIC	NZH	RCH	SBO	TEX	LVS	PHO	CAL	24th	1419	

Sporting positions
Preceded by Tim Schendel	ASA Midwest Tour Champion; 2007	Succeeded by Dan Fredrickson
