= La Crosse Fairgrounds Speedway =

Racetrack

Coordinates: 43.9043°N 91.1043°W

LaCrosse Fairgrounds Speedway

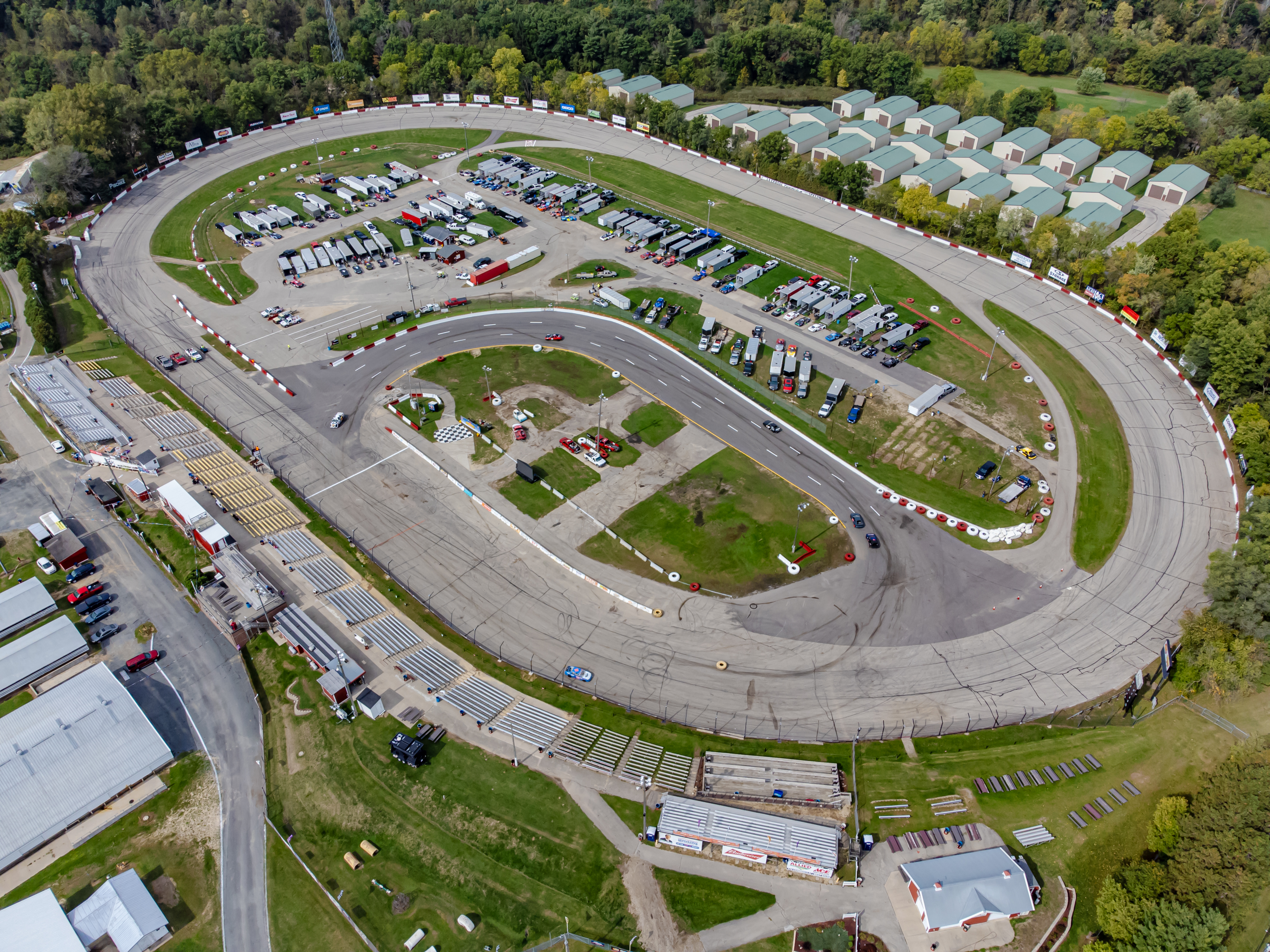
- Location: Town of Hamilton, near West Salem, Wisconsin, United States
- Opened: 1957
- Former names: La Crosse Interstate Speedway
- Major events: Oktoberfest (ARCA Midwest Tour, Big 8 Series)
- Website: http://www.lacrossespeedway.com/

5/8 mile outer
- Surface: asphalt
- Length: 0.62 mi (1 km)

1/4 mile inner
- Surface: asphalt
- Length: 0.25 mi (0.40 km)

The La Crosse Fairgrounds Speedway is a semi-banked asphalt oval racetrack in West Salem, Wisconsin. The outer track is 5/8 mile and the inner track is a 1/4 mile. The speedway has progressive banking in the corners, from 5 degrees on the bottom to 11 degrees on the top. The track was built at the fairgrounds for La Crosse County. It used to host an event on the American Speed Association (ASA) and the ASA Late Model Series before the demise of the series. It currently hosts annual touring events on the ARCA Midwest Tour and Mid American Stock Car Series. It hosts weekly stock car races which are sanctioned by the NASCAR Advance Auto Parts Weekly Series. It was the first NASCAR-sanctioned race track in Wisconsin.

== Track history ==
The track opened as a half mile dirt track in 1957 in West Salem, Wisconsin as part of the relocation of the La Crosse Interstate Fairgrounds from the site of Veterans' Memorial Stadium on the University of Wisconsin-La Crosse campus. It originally ran a single annual International Motor Contest Association (IMCA) event and it was known as the La Crosse Inter-State Fairgrounds. The event featured IMCA "Big Car" (now known as sprint cars), midgets, and "New Model" stock cars (similar to stock cars raced by USAC cars and NASCAR's Grand National Series). The event ran until 1966, and numerous notable drivers competed in these events, including Johnny Beauchamp, Jim Hurtubise, Dick Hutcherson, Ramo Stott, Parnelli Jones, Johnny Rutherford, and Tom Bigelow.

The track was paved in 1970 as a half mile, with the track's current banked grandstand being built at the same time. Jim Sauter won the track's first event on July 14, 1970. Robert Morris and Larry Wehrs were the promoters for the first two seasons before Wehrs became the sole promoter in 1972. Racing alternated between Friday and Wednesday nights for the first five seasons before permanently running on Wednesday nights in 1975. The Central Wisconsin Racing Association (CWRA) Late Models were the featured division at La Crosse from 1970 until 1991. Following the 1986 season the La Crosse County Agricultural Society, the owners of the racetrack, decided to make a change with the promoter. Instead of renewing with Wehrs, the La Crosse County Ag Society went with Midwest Motorsports Management as the new promoter. Longtime ARTGO Challenge Series president John McKarns and Rockford Speedway president Jody Deery headed up the new promoter group, with Deery's youngest son Chuck named the track manager. In 1989 La Crosse became the first track in Wisconsin to become a part of the NASCAR Winston Racing Series (now the NASCAR Advance Auto Parts Weekly Series), NASCAR's national weekly short track program. The track would run the NASCAR shows on Saturday nights, which would become the main race night starting in 1992. Five drivers (Kevin Nuttleman, Paul Proksch, Charlie Menard, Steve Carlson and Nick Panitzke) would go on to claim either a regional, divisional or state championship. Carlson would capture the NASCAR Whelen All-American Series national championship in 2007, the first for a driver from the state of Wisconsin. Nuttleman would become the first driver in NASCAR Whelen All-American Series history to claim a championship under all three formats (Great Northern Region in 1989, Division III in 2005 and Wisconsin State Championship in 2009), and is one of the 25 greatest drivers in NASCAR Whelen All-American Series history.

== Weekly racing ==
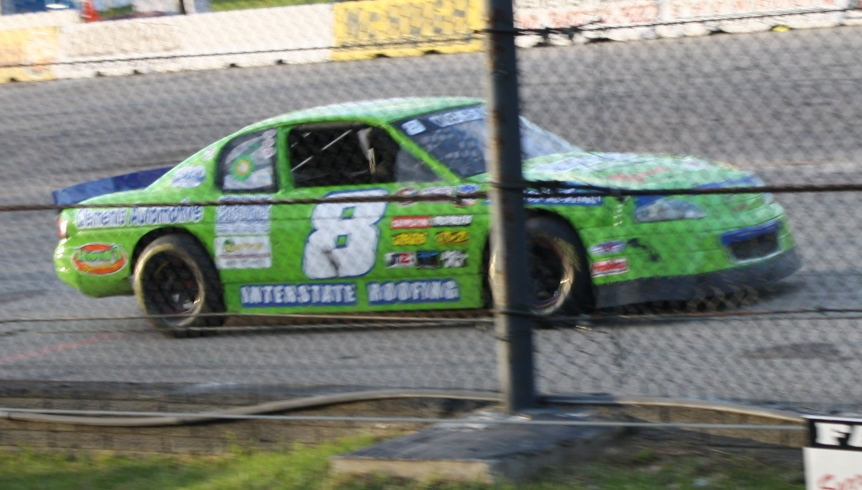
2009 Sportsman

LaCrosse Fairgrounds Speedway hosts weekly stock car races on Saturday nights which are sanctioned by NASCAR, under the NASCAR Advance Auto Parts Weekly Series banner.

The headline division at the track is the NASCAR late models. Other classes include Sportsman, Hornets, Street Stocks, Six Shooters, Mini-Vans, the High School Racing Association plus several novelty events throughout the season. Visiting series include the CWRA Late Models, the INEX Great North Legends, the Milwaukee Stock Car Racing Association, the American Super Cup Series and the Upper Midwest Vintage Racing Series. Starting in 2008, the track featured Friday Night Street Drags the second Friday of the month from May to September. The Street Drags were moved to the third Thursday of the month starting in 2023. Starting in 2009, the Street Drags concluded with the 300' Bracket Nationals the Saturday following the Oktoberfest Race Weekend.

== Special events ==
=== Eve of Destruction ===
The track hosts an annual "Eve of Destruction" event the first Saturday after Labor Day. It features a trailer race where the last car with a trailer left wins, along with Doug Rose's Green Mamba Jet Car, hornets, skidders, monster trucks, and motorcycle stunt riders. A similar event called the "Smash-O-Rama" takes place the third Saturday night in June.

=== Oktoberfest Race Weekend ===
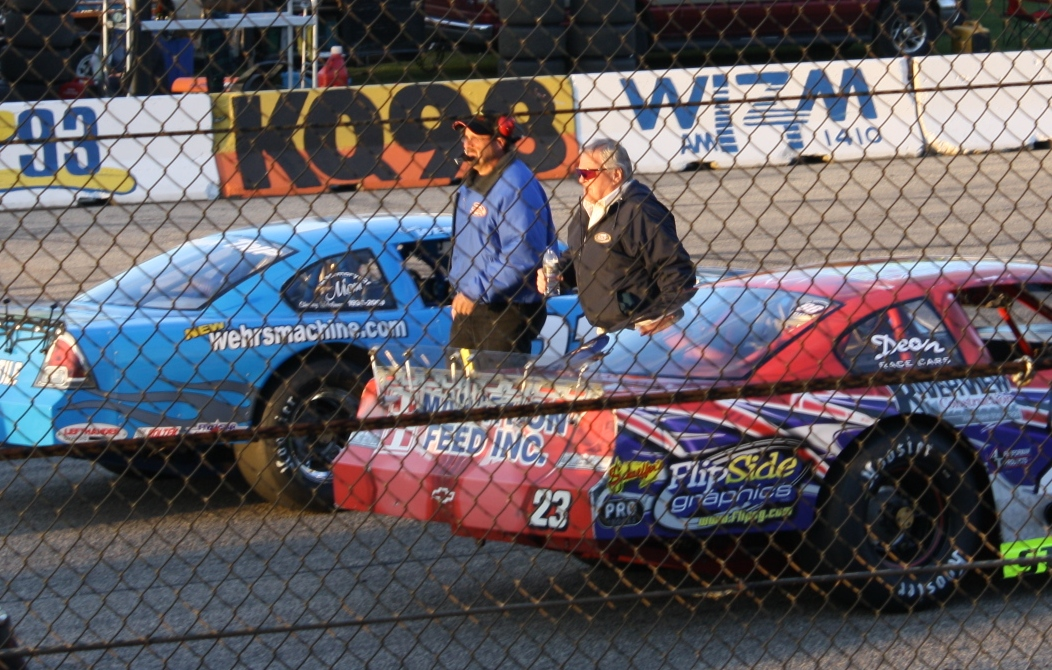
Trickle (right) at the 2009 Dick Trickle 99

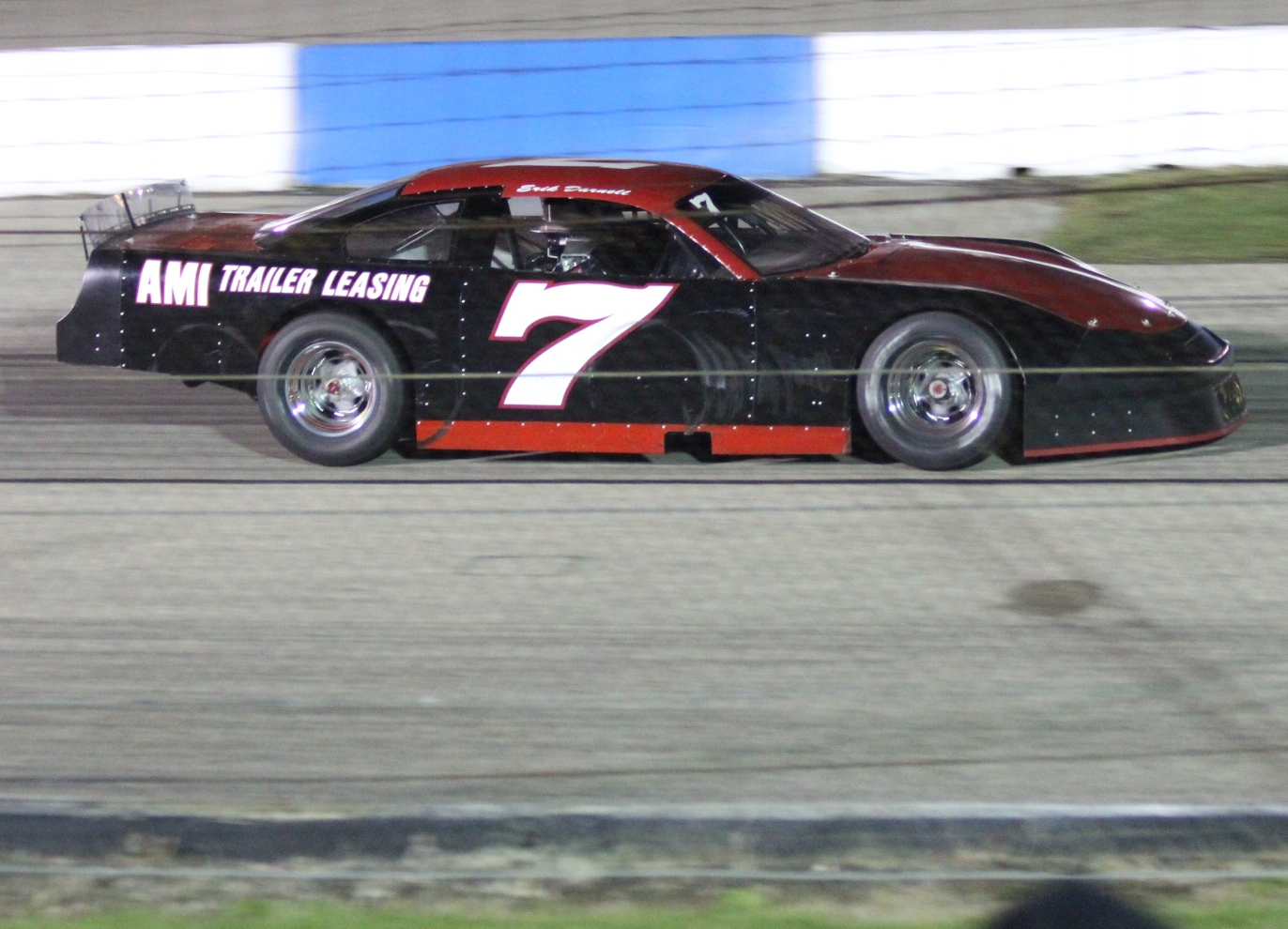
Erik Darnell after winning the 2013 Dick Trickle 99

Since 1970 the track has featured the annual Oktoberfest Race Weekend as its season finale, usually the weekend after La Crosse's Oktoberfest celebration concludes. It began as a two-day event, then expanded to three days in 1975 and expanded to its current four-day format (Thursday through Sunday) in 1998. Touring series that race at the event include the Mid American Stock Car Series, the Big 8 Late Model Series, the Midwest Truck Tour and the ARCA Midwest Tour.

==== Dick Trickle 99 ====
The Friday night headliner in the Dick Trickle 99, a 99 lap super late model event, patterned after the Vermont Milk Bowl at Thunder Road International SpeedBowl, with three 33 lap segments. Each driver scores one point for first, two for second, three for third, and so forth based on the finish of each race, and the winner of the meet is the driver with the lowest total score after the three 33-lap races. The length is taken from Trickle's #99 that he had raced in Wisconsin before moving to NASCAR. Past winners include:

- 2025 Andrew Morrissey
- 2024 Ty Fredrickson
- 2023 Ty Majeski
- 2022 Ty Majeski
- 2021 Ty Majeski
- 2020 Dan Fredrickson
- 2019 Nick Murgic
- 2018 Johnny Sauter
- 2017 RAINED OUT
- 2016 Dan Fredrickson
- 2015 Ty Majeski
- 2014 Dan Fredrickson
- 2013 Erik Darnell
- 2012 Skylar Holzhausen
- 2011 Neil Knoblock
- 2010 Dan Fredrickson
- 2009 Chris Weinkauf
- 2008 Nathan Haseleu
- 2007 Steve Holzhausen

==== Main event ====
The sanctioning body for the main event for the weekend has varied through the years. It began using the Central Wisconsin Racing Association rules between 1970 and 1986. The ARTGO touring series took over sanction from 1987 until 1997. ARTGO was sold to NASCAR and the series took various names between 1998 until 2006. The 2006 main event was a Wisconsin Late Model event even though NASCAR ran its final Elite Division race that Friday night. The ASA Midwest Tour took over the main event in 2007 and has held it ever since.

Joe Shear is the first driver to have won five main events, but that record was matched by Ty Majeski when he won the 2025 main event. Travis Sauter and Dan Fredrickson are second with four victories each.

- 2025 Ty Majeski ASA Midwest Tour
- 2024 Ty Majeski ASA Midwest Tour
- 2023 Gabe Sommers ASA Midwest Tour
- 2022 Andrew Morrissey ARCA Midwest Tour
- 2021 Casey Johnson ARCA Midwest Tour
- 2020 Ty Majeski ARCA Midwest Tour
- 2019 Ty Majeski ARCA Midwest Tour
- 2018 Andrew Morrissey ARCA Midwest Tour Morrissey actually finished 4th, but due to the disqualifications of winner Ty Majeski (intake height), second-place finisher Johnny Sauter (left side weight) and third-place finisher Jacob Goede (intake), Morrissey was declared the winner.
- 2017 Johnny Sauter ARCA Midwest Tour
- 2016 Ty Majeski ARCA Midwest Tour
- 2015 Dan Fredrickson ARCA Midwest Tour
- 2014 Travis Sauter ARCA Midwest Tour
- 2013 Nathan Haseleu ARCA Midwest Tour
- 2012 Travis Sauter ARCA Midwest Tour
- 2011 Travis Sauter ASA Midwest Tour (Johnny Sauter was the original winner of the race, but two weeks later ASA Midwest Tour officials revealed that Sauter's car had parts that were not from ASA Midwest Tour-approved vendors. Sauter had all points and purse money taken away, but he was allowed to keep the win. La Crosse Fairgrounds Speedway officials felt differently and stripped Sauter of the win and being the overall Oktoberfest champion, which was given to Travis Sauter.)
- 2010 Dan Fredrickson ASA Midwest Tour
- 2009 Travis Sauter ASA Midwest Tour
- 2008 Dan Fredrickson ASA Midwest Tour
- 2007 Dan Fredrickson ASA Midwest Tour
- 2006 Steve Holzhausen (Wisconsin Late Model; The Wisconsin Late Models were the headliners of the 2006 Oktoberfest, even though the NASCAR AutoZone Midwest Series ran on Friday of Oktoberfest weekend. This was the NASCAR AutoZone Midwest Series' final race ever.)
- 2005 Tim Schendel (NASCAR AutoZone)
- 2004 Brian Hoppe (NASCAR AutoZone)
- 2003 Tim Schendel (NASCAR ITEMS)
- 2002 Brian Hoppe (NASCAR Re/Max)
- 2001 Eddie Hoffman (NASCAR Re/Max)
- 2000 Steve Carlson (NASCAR Re/Max)
- 1999 Eddie Hoffman (NASCAR Re/Max)
- 1998 Eddie Hoffman (NASCAR Re/Max)
- 1997 Terry Baldry (ARTGO Challenge)
- 1996 Joe Shear (ARTGO Challenge)
- 1995 Joe Shear (ARTGO Challenge)
- 1994 Joe Shear (ARTGO Challenge)
- 1993 Matt Kenseth (ARTGO Challenge)
- 1992 Tom Carlson (ARTGO Challenge)
- 1991 Tom Carlson (ARTGO Challenge)
- 1990 Scott Hansen (ARTGO Challenge)
- 1989 Joe Shear (ARTGO Challenge)
- 1988 Ted Musgrave (ARTGO Challenge)
- 1987 Dick Trickle (ARTGO Challenge)
- 1986 Rich Bickle (CWRA)
- 1985 John Ziegler (CWRA)
- 1984 Bryan Reffner (CWRA)
- 1983 Tom Reffner (CWRA)
- 1982 Jim Back (CWRA)
- 1981 Junior Hanley (CWRA)
- 1980 Mark Martin (CWRA)
- 1979 Butch Miller (CWRA)
- 1978 Dave Watson (CWRA)
- 1977 Larry Detjens (CWRA)
- 1976 Larry Detjens (CWRA)
- 1975 Tom Reffner (CWRA)
- 1974 Jerry Makara (CWRA)
- 1973 Marv Marzofka (CWRA)
- 1972 Joe Shear (CWRA)
- 1971 Dick Trickle (CWRA)
- 1970 Tom Reffner (CWRA)

== Track records ==
=== 5/8 Mile ===
- American Indycar Series(X) Ken Petrie—18.713 on 5/22/99
- American Speed Association(X) Rick Beebe—19.415 on 6/6/98
- ASA Midwest Tour Ty Majeski—18.476 on 10/9/21
- Area Sportsmen Dave Trute—20.617 on 10/6/23
- ARTGO Challenge Series(X) Steve Holzhausen—18.903 on 10/7/95
- ASA Late Model North Series(X) Chris Eggleston—19.151 on 6/27/09
- Big 8 Late Models Ty Majeski—19.676 on 10/8/16
- Bandit Big Rig Series(X) Justin Ball—26.348 on 7/28/18
- Central Wisconsin Late Models(X) Blake Horstman—19.064 on 10/6/06
- CWRA Late Models Dick Trickle—19.537 on 6/22/89
- Grand National Sportsmen Nick Clements—20.869 on 5/14/16
- Great Northern Sportsmen Series(X) Scott Luck—21.088 on 10/5/18
- Mid-Am Racing Series George Schultz—20.481 on 10/9/04
- Mid-American Truck Series(X) Terry Marzofka—20.810 on 10/10/98
- Midwest Dash Series Dan Braun—22.122 on 10/7/23
- Midwest Truck Series Ty Majeski—19.986 on 10/7/23
- Midwest Trucks(X) Adam Shackelford—20.567 on 10/9/98
- NASCAR Late Models Dan Frederickson—19.374 on 5/28/22
- NASCAR Midwest Series(X) Erik Darnell—19.076 on 10/8/05
- Pro Four Modifieds(X) Mel Walen—20.828 on 10/7/94
- Super Late Model Futures Michael Hinde—18.544 on 10/2/25
- Super Late Model Knights Dalton Zehr—18.498 on 10/6/22
- Super Late Model Dick Trickle 99(#) Ty Majeski—18.405 on 10/8/21
- Super Sportsmen(X) Colin Reffner—20.952 on 10/9/09
- TUNDRA Super Late Model Series Ty Majeski—18.786 on 6/30/17
- USAC National Midgets(+) Kody Swanson—18.177 on 5/16/08
- Wisconsin Late Models(X) Mark Eswein—18.997 on 10/7/06

(X)--Inactive division or series (+)--All time 5/8-mile qualifying record and Open Wheel qualifying record (#)--All time stock car qualifying record

=== 1/4 Mile ===
- American Super Cup Series Sean Eurick—15.441 on 7/2/22
- Bandits(X) Nick Schmidt—16.542 on 10/4/18
- CWRA Late Models Darek Gress—14.178 on 7/17/24
- High School Racing Association Alivia Moore—16.304 on 7/12/25
- Hobby Stocks(X) Mike Krueger Jr.--15.210 on 5/28/22
- Hornets Shane Kohlmeier—15.402 on 10/2/25
- INEX Legends Colin Stocker—14.347 on 7/20/22
- Junior Motorsports(X) Shane Poenhelt—16.522 on 10/4/01
- Mini Vans Jay Raines Jr.--16.687 on 7/8/23
- Outlawz(X)(+) Cory Kemkes—13.814 on 10/4/18
- Street Stocks Chris Larson—15.897 on 7/2/22
- Six Shooters Matt Moore—16.107 on 5/31/25

(X)--Inactive division/series (+)--All-time 1/4-mile qualifying record

== Images ==
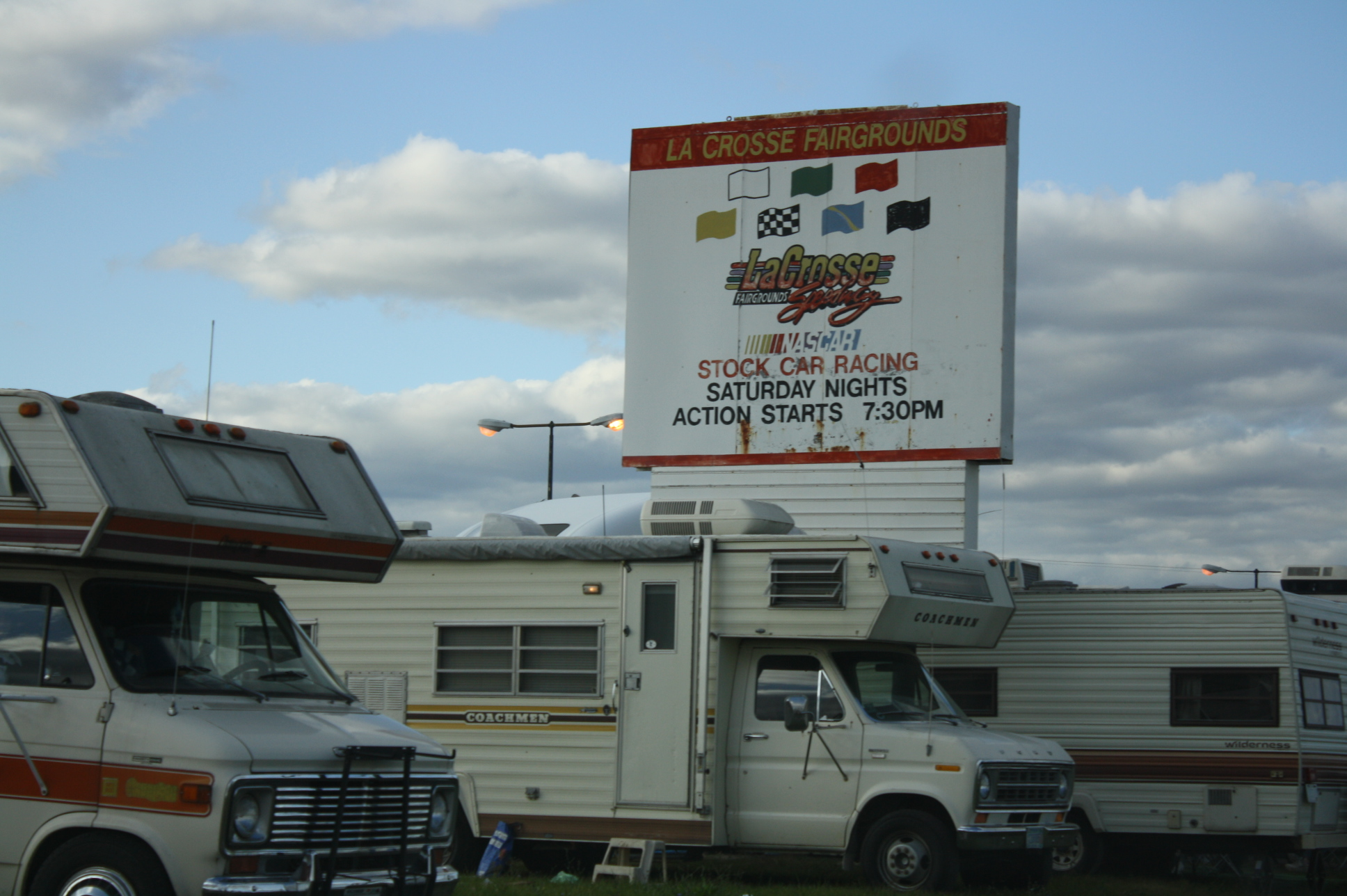
Sign during Oktoberfest

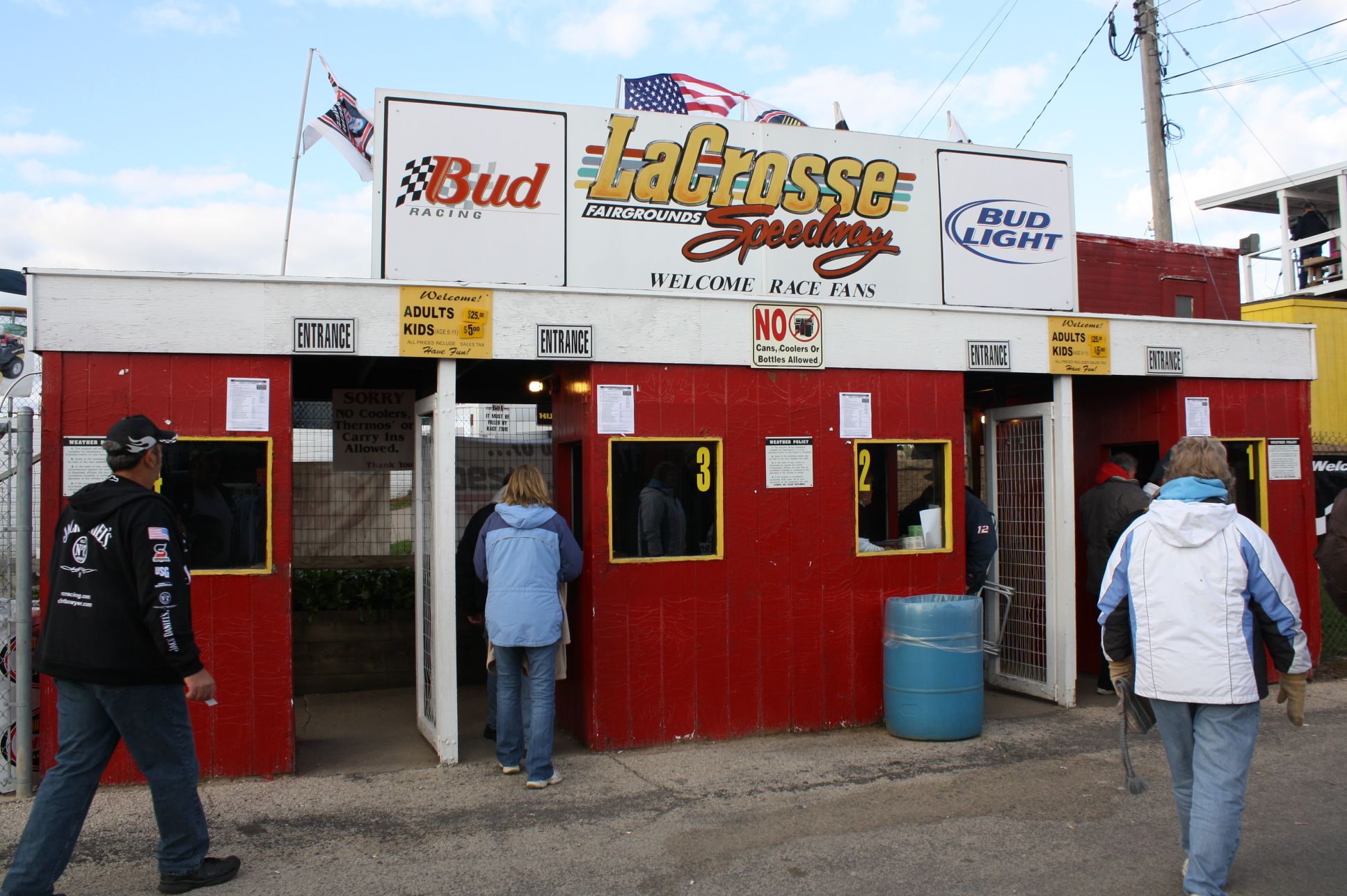
Ticket booth

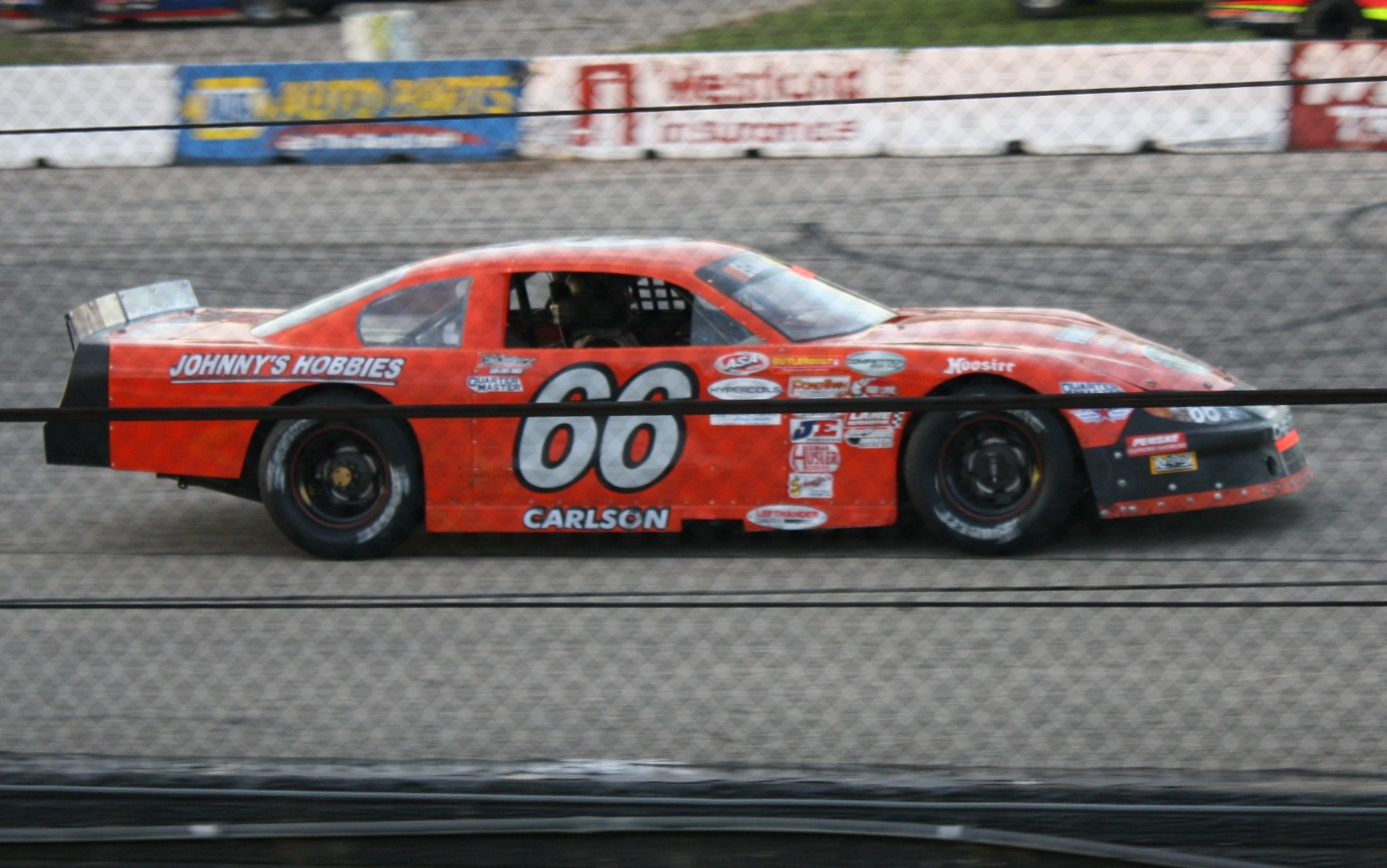
Steve Carlson's 2009 late model

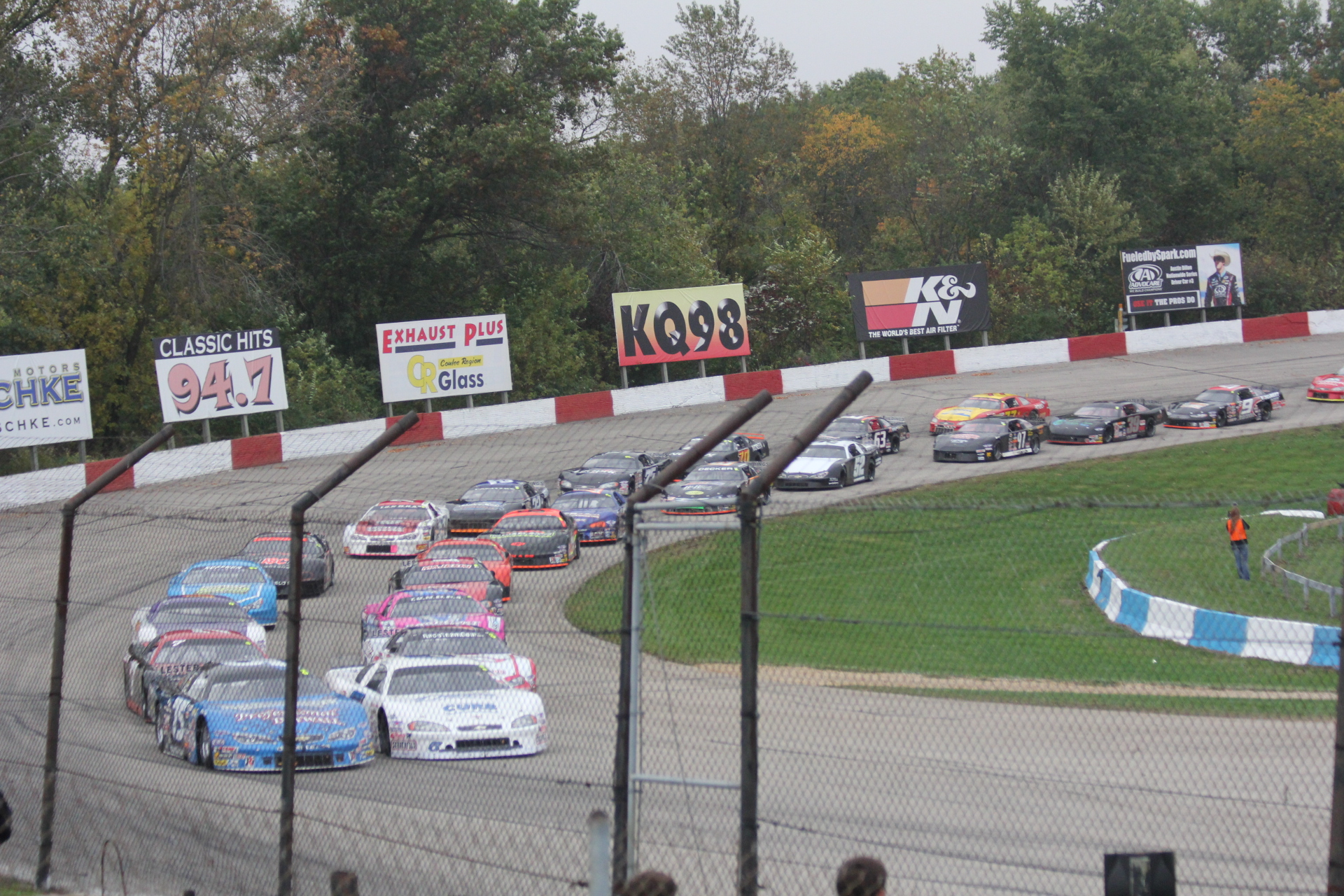
Super Late Models in Turn 4 starting the 2013 Dick Trickle 99

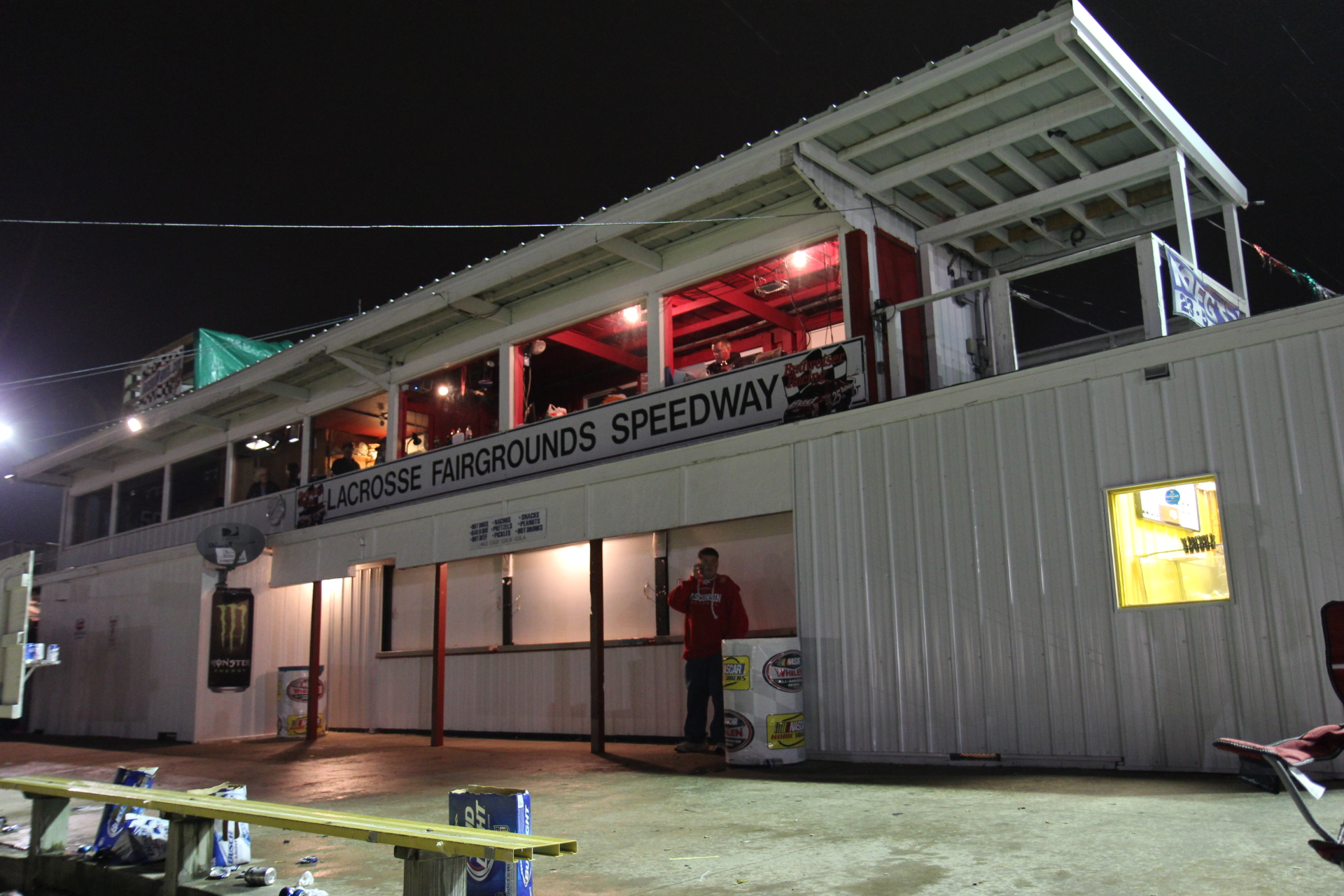
Scoring tower

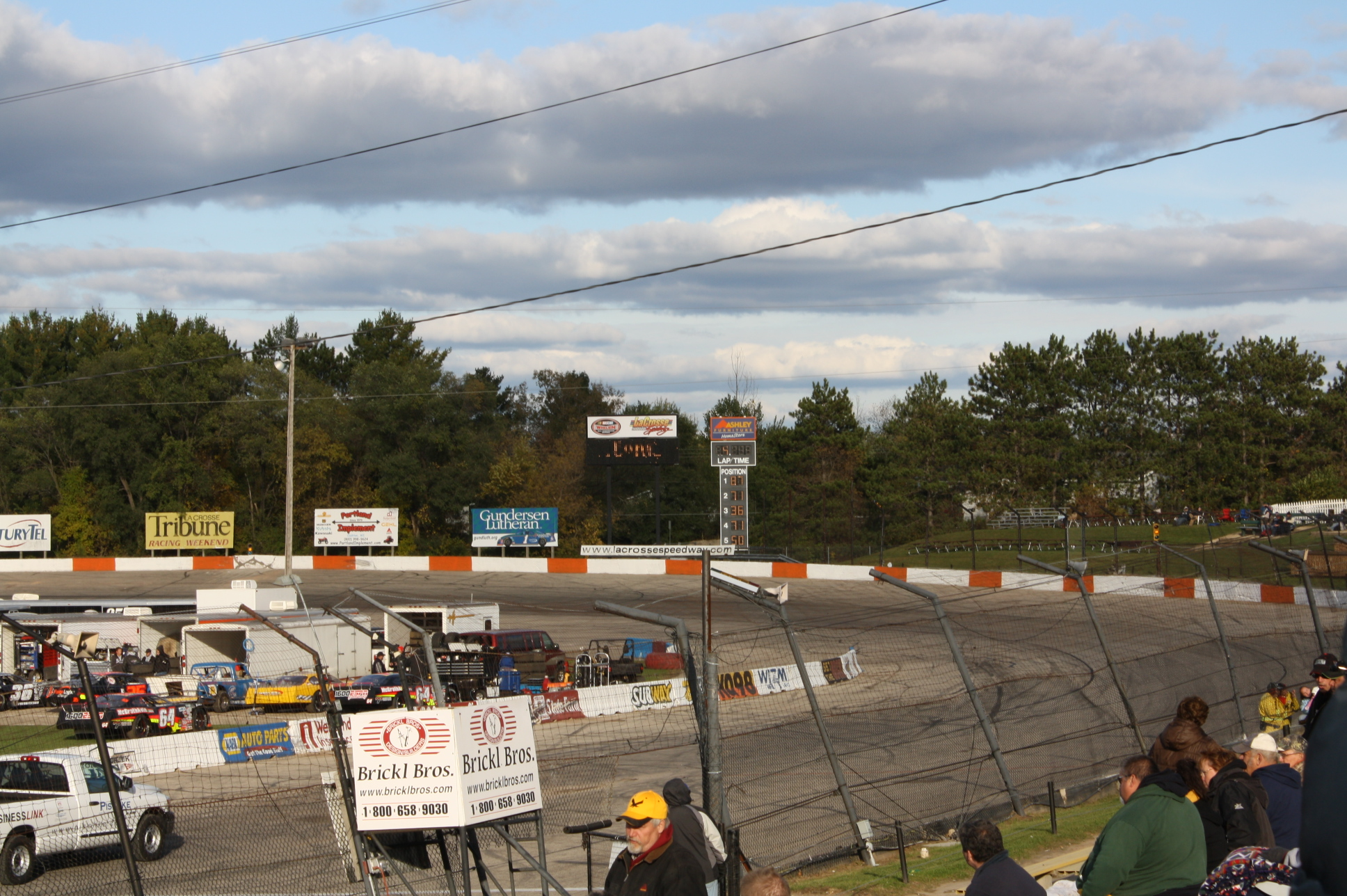
Turn 1

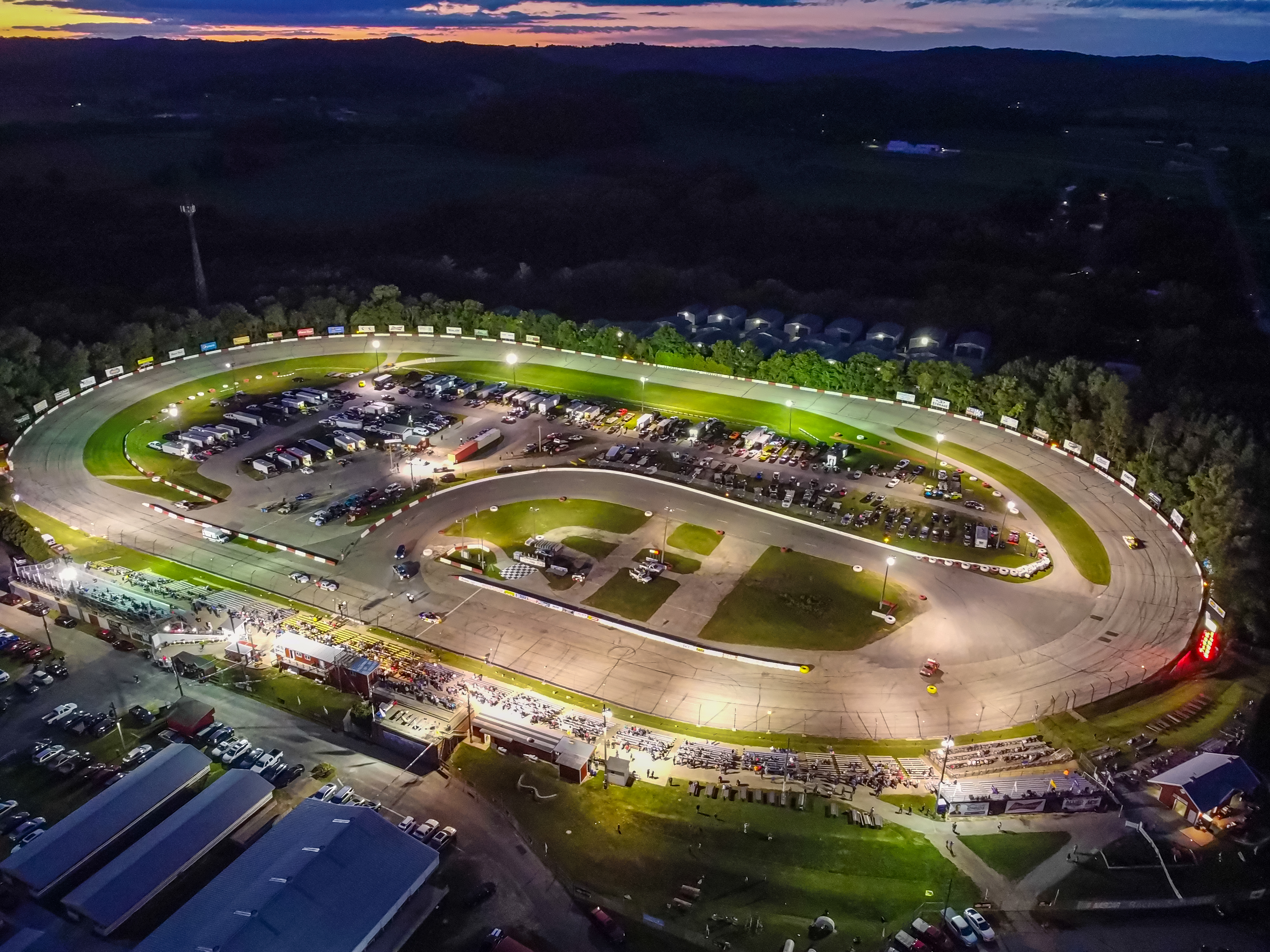
In the evening
