= Travis Sauter =

American racing driver (born 1982)

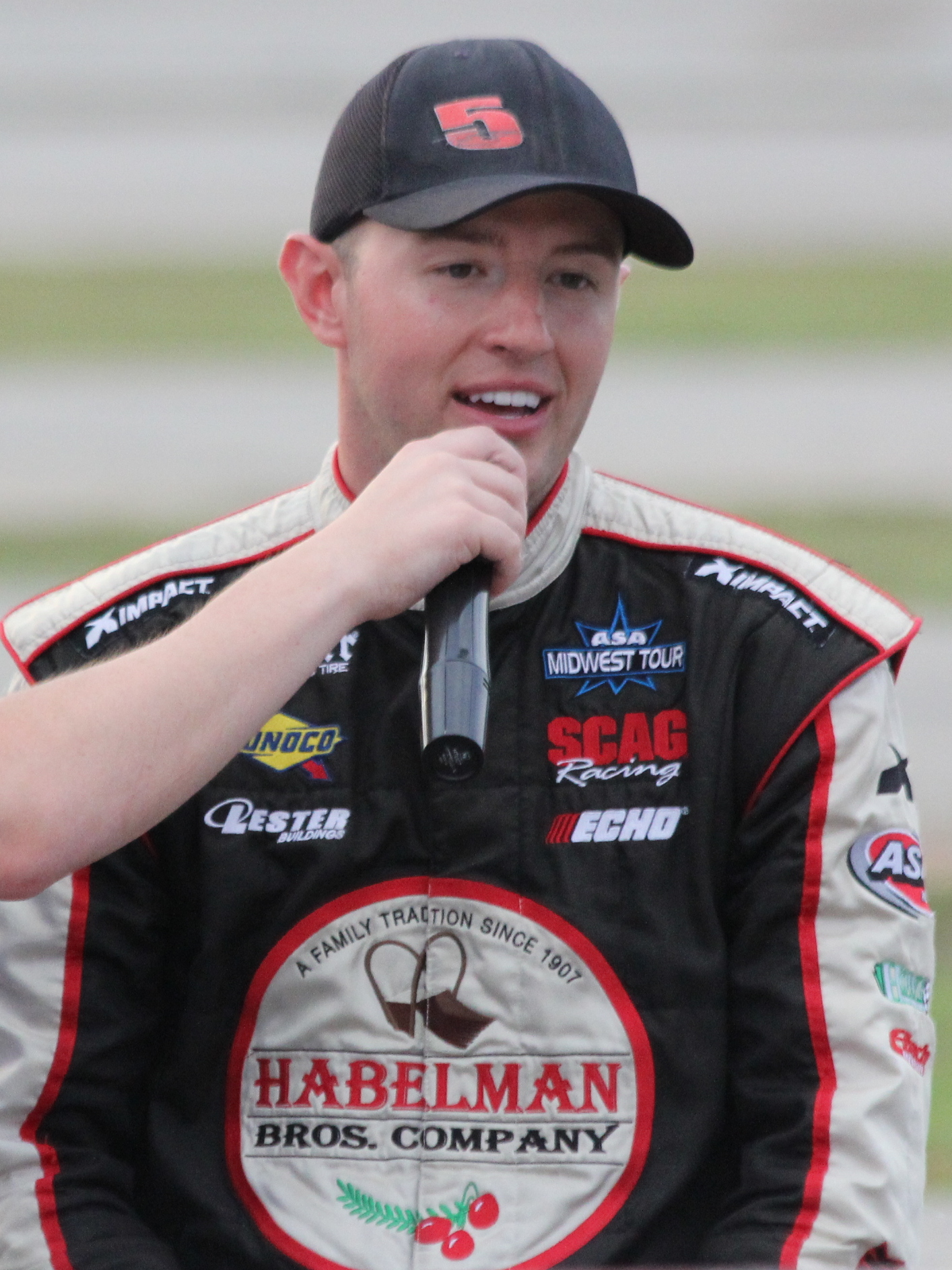
- Sauter in 2014
- Born: August 1, 1982 (age 44); Necedah, Wisconsin, U.S.
- Achievements: Four time Oktoberfest winner at LaCrosse(2009, 2011, 2012, 2014); 2012 Howie Lettow Memorial 150 winner

NASCAR O'Reilly Auto Parts Series career
- 1 race run over 1 year
- 2013 position: 79th
- Best finish: 79th (2013)
- First race: 2013 U.S. Cellular 250 (Iowa)
Wins	Top tens	Poles
0	0	0

ARCA Midwest Tour career
- Debut season: 2007
- Car number: 5
- Starts: 57
- Wins: 7
- Poles: 1
- Best finish: 7th in 2008

Previous series
- 2004–2007: ASALMS Sunoco National Tour
- Statistics up to date as of November 16, 2013.

Travis Sauter (born August 1, 1982) is an American professional stock car racing driver. A regular competitor in several midwestern racing series, he is second on the all-time win list with four Oktoberfest wins at the LaCrosse Fairgrounds Speedway.

Travis is the grandson of Jim Sauter, son of Tim, and nephew of Johnny and Jay.

== Career ==
Sauter began his racing career in 2002, finishing second in the track championship at Madison International Speedway in 2006 before moving full-time to touring series events in 2007, having started running the ASA Late Model Series in 2004.

Competing primarily in the ASA Midwest Tour (now ARCA Midwest Tour), Sauter has won six times in 53 starts in the series, with a best points finish of seventh in 2008; he has also won four times in Oktoberfest races at La Crosse Fairgrounds Speedway.

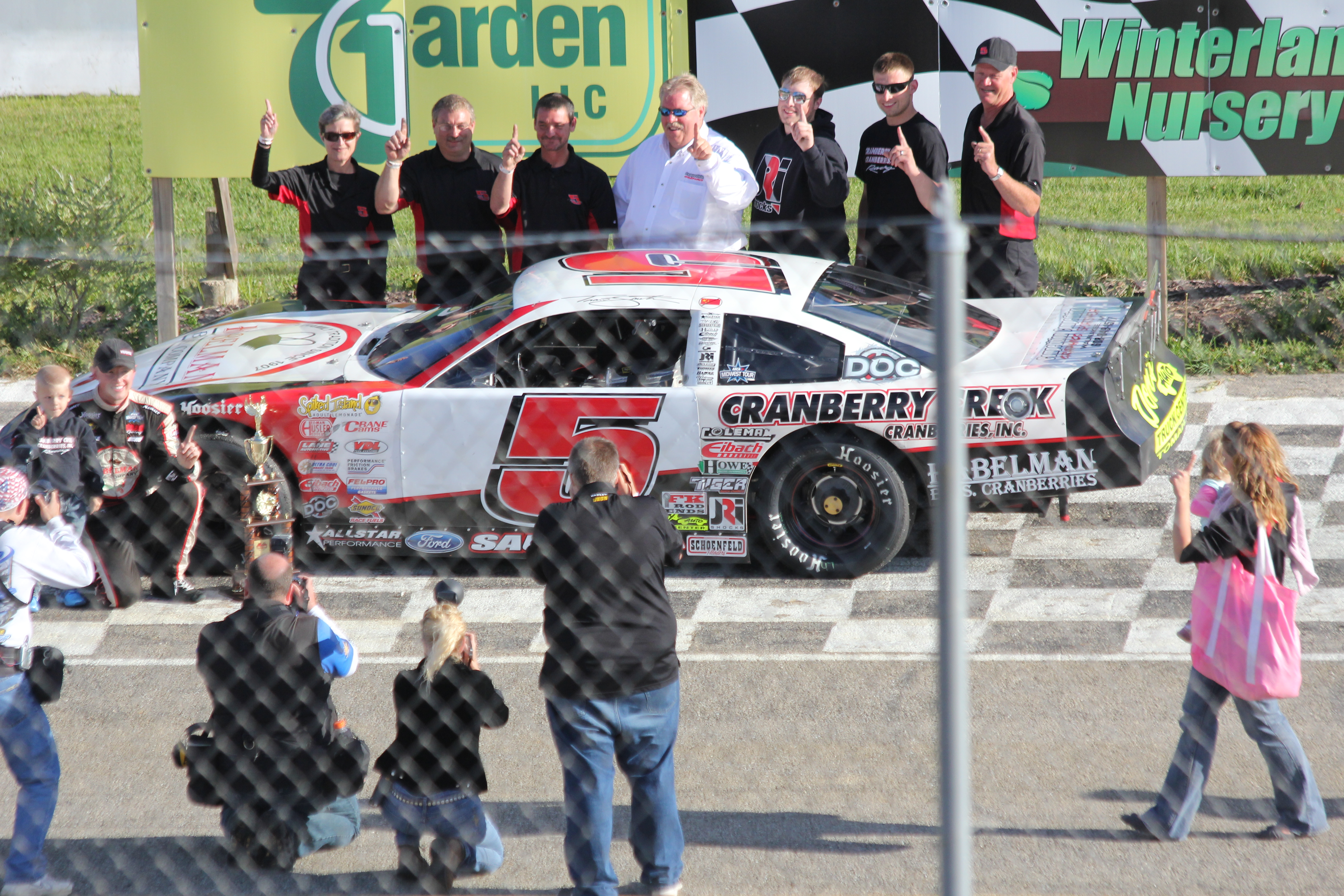
Sauter (kneeling left) and his pit crew in victory lane at Madison International Speedway in 2013

Owning his own race team, Sauter currently competes in selected, high-profile events throughout the Midwest. In 2012, he won the inaugural Howie Lettow Memorial 150 at the Milwaukee Mile, topping a field of over 80 late models to win the event.

Sauter finished second to Kyle Busch in the Howie Lettow Memorial 150 in 2013, before making his debut in NASCAR competition at Iowa Speedway in August, driving for Joe Nemechek. Sauter set the all-time track record at the 1/3 mile Dells Raceway Park on August 17, 2013, with a time of 13.108 seconds in his Super Late Model.

Sauter started his 2015 season by winning the inaugural Icebreaker 100 super late model at Dells Raceway Park in a feature field of 24 drivers.

== Motorsports career results ==
=== NASCAR ===
(key) (Bold – Pole position awarded by qualifying time. Italics – Pole position earned by points standings or practice time. * – Most laps led.)

==== Nationwide Series ====
NASCAR Nationwide Series results
Year	Team	No.	Make	1	2	3	4	5	6	7	8	9	10	11	12	13	14	15	16	17	18	19	20	21	22	23	24	25	26	27	28	29	30	31	32	33	NNSC	Pts	Ref
2013	NEMCO Motorsports	87	Toyota	DAY	PHO	LVS	BRI	CAL	TEX	RCH	TAL	DAR	CLT	DOV	IOW	MCH	ROA	KEN	DAY	NHA	CHI	IND	IOW; 30	GLN	MOH	BRI	ATL	RCH	CHI	KEN	DOV	KAN	CLT	TEX	PHO	HOM	79th	14	

^{*} Season still in progress
^{1} Ineligible for series points

=== ARCA Racing Series ===
(key) (Bold – Pole position awarded by qualifying time. Italics – Pole position earned by points standings or practice time. * – Most laps led.)

ARCA Racing Series results
Year	Team	No.	Make	1	2	3	4	5	6	7	8	9	10	11	12	13	14	15	16	17	18	19	20	21	ARSC	Pts	Ref
2013	Roulo Brothers Racing	99	Ford	DAY	MOB	SLM	TAL	TOL	ELK	POC	MCH	ROA	WIN	CHI	NJE	POC	BLN	ISF	MAD; 16	DSF	IOW	SLM	KEN	KAN	116th	150	

Achievements
Preceded by Inaugural	Howie Lettow Memorial 150 Winner; 2012	Succeeded by Kyle Busch
