= 2011 5-hour Energy 200 =

Race details
- Dover International Speedway
- Date: May 14, 2011
- Official name: 2011 5-hour Energy 200
- Location: Dover International Speedway in Dover, Delaware
- Course: Permanent racing facility
- Course length: 1 miles (1.6 km)
- Distance: 209 laps, 209 mi (336.4 km)
- Scheduled distance: 200 laps, 200 mi (321.9 km)
- Weather: Cloudy
- Average speed: 95.18 mph (153.18 km/h)
- Attendance: 28,000

Pole position
Driver	Carl Edwards	Roush Fenway Racing
- Time: N/A (No time trials)

Most laps led
Driver	Carl Edwards	Roush Fenway Racing
- Laps: 87

Winner
No. 60	Carl Edwards	Roush Fenway Racing

Television in the United States
- Network: ESPN
- Announcers: Marty Reid, Dale Jarrett, Andy Petree

The 2011 5-hour Energy 200 was the 11th stock car race of the 2011 NASCAR Nationwide Series and the 30th iteration of the event. The race was held on Saturday May 14, 2011 in Dover, Delaware at Dover International Speedway, a 1-mile (1.6 km) permanent oval-shaped racetrack. Carl Edwards won the race after a spectacular crash on the final lap of the race after two Green-White-Checkered attempts.

== Background ==
Dover International Speedway is an oval race track in Dover, Delaware, United States that has held at least two NASCAR races since it opened in 1969. In addition to NASCAR, the track also hosted USAC and the NTT IndyCar Series. The track features one layout, a 1-mile (1.6 km) concrete oval, with 24° banking in the turns and 9° banking on the straights. The speedway is owned and operated by Dover Motorsports.

The track, nicknamed "The Monster Mile", was built in 1969 by Melvin Joseph of Melvin L. Joseph Construction Company, Inc., with an asphalt surface, but was replaced with concrete in 1995. Six years later in 2001, the track's capacity moved to 135,000 seats, making the track have the largest capacity of sports venue in the mid-Atlantic. In 2002, the name changed to Dover International Speedway from Dover Downs International Speedway after Dover Downs Gaming and Entertainment split, making Dover Motorsports. From 2007 to 2009, the speedway worked on an improvement project called "The Monster Makeover", which expanded facilities at the track and beautified the track. After the 2014 season, the track's capacity was reduced to 95,500 seats.

=== Entry List ===
- (R) denotes rookie driver
- (i) denotes driver who is ineligible for series driver points

#	Driver	Team	Make
0	Brad Teague	JD Motorsports	Chevrolet
01	Mike Wallace	JD Motorsports	Chevrolet
2	Elliott Sadler	Kevin Harvick Inc.	Chevrolet
04	Charles Lewandoski (R)	Go Green Racing	Ford
6	Ricky Stenhouse Jr.	Roush Fenway Racing	Ford
7	Josh Wise	JR Motorsports	Chevrolet
09	Kenny Wallace	RAB Racing	Toyota
11	Brian Scott	Joe Gibbs Racing	Toyota
13	Jennifer Jo Cobb (R)	JJC Racing	Ford
14	Mike Bliss	TriStar Motorsports	Chevrolet
15	Timmy Hill (R)	Rick Ware Racing	Ford
16	Kevin Swindell	Roush Fenway Racing	Ford
18	Kyle Busch (i)	Joe Gibbs Racing	Toyota
19	Eric McClure	TriStar Motorsports	Chevrolet
20	Joey Logano (i)	Joe Gibbs Racing	Toyota
22	Brad Keselowski (i)	Penske Racing	Dodge
23	Alex Kennedy	R3 Motorsports	Dodge
28	Derrike Cope	Jay Robinson Racing	Chevrolet
30	James Buescher (i)	Turner Motorsports	Chevrolet
31	Justin Allgaier	Turner Motorsports	Chevrolet
32	Reed Sorenson	Turner Motorsports	Chevrolet
33	Clint Bowyer (i)	Kevin Harvick Inc.	Chevrolet
38	Jason Leffler	Turner Motorsports	Chevrolet
39	Danny Efland	Go Green Racing	Ford
40	Scott Wimmer	Key Motorsports	Chevrolet
41	Carl Long	Rick Ware Racing	Ford
44	Jeff Green	TriStar Motorsports	Chevrolet
51	Jeremy Clements	Jeremy Clements Racing	Chevrolet
52	Kevin Lepage	Means Motorsports	Chevrolet
55	Brett Rowe	Faith Motorsports	Chevrolet
60	Carl Edwards (i)	Roush Fenway Racing	Ford
62	Michael Annett	Rusty Wallace Racing	Toyota
64	David Reutimann (i)	Rusty Wallace Racing	Toyota
66	Steve Wallace	Rusty Wallace Racing	Toyota
67	J. R. Fitzpatrick	Go Canada Racing	Ford
68	Matt Carter	Fleur-de-lis Motorsports	Chevrolet
70	Dennis Setzer	Jay Robinson Racing	Dodge
74	Mike Harmon	Mike Harmon Racing	Chevrolet
75	Johnny Chapman	Rick Ware Racing	Ford
79	Tim Andrews	2nd Chance Motorsports	Ford
81	Donnie Neuenberger	MacDonald Motorsports	Dodge
82	Blake Koch (R)	MacDonald Motorsports	Dodge
87	Joe Nemechek	NEMCO Motorsports	Toyota
88	Aric Almirola	JR Motorsports	Chevrolet
89	Morgan Shepherd	Faith Motorsports	Chevrolet
99	Ryan Truex (R)	Pastrana-Waltrip Racing	Toyota
Official entry list

== Qualifying ==
Carl Edwards won the pole after qualifying was rained out.

Grid	No.	Driver	Team	Manufacturer
1	60	Carl Edwards (i)	Roush Fenway Racing	Ford
2	6	Ricky Stenhouse Jr.	Roush Fenway Racing	Ford
3	33	Clint Bowyer (i)	Kevin Harvick Inc.	Chevrolet
4	31	Justin Allgaier	Turner Motorsports	Chevrolet
5	16	Kevin Swindell	Roush Fenway Racing	Ford
6	22	Brad Keselowski	Penske Racing	Dodge
7	11	Brian Scott	Joe Gibbs Racing	Toyota
8	2	Elliott Sadler	Kevin Harvick Inc.	Chevrolet
9	38	Jason Leffler	Turner Motorsports	Chevrolet
10	32	Reed Sorenson	Turner Motorsports	Chevrolet
11	20	Joey Logano (i)	Joe Gibbs Racing	Toyota
12	30	James Buescher (i)	Turner Motorsports	Chevrolet
13	18	Kyle Busch (i)	Joe Gibbs Racing	Toyota
14	09	Kenny Wallace	RAB Racing	Toyota
15	66	Steve Wallace	Rusty Wallace Racing	Toyota
16	7	Josh Wise	JR Motorsports	Chevrolet
17	99	Ryan Truex (R)	Pastrana-Waltrip Racing	Toyota
18	88	Aric Almirola	JR Motorsports	Chevrolet
19	62	Michael Annett	Rusty Wallace Racing	Toyota
20	87	Joe Nemechek	NEMCO Motorsports	Toyota
21	01	Mike Wallace	JD Motorsports	Chevrolet
22	40	Scott Wimmer	Key Motorsports	Chevrolet
23	19	Eric McClure	TriStar Motorsports	Chevrolet
24	23	Alex Kennedy	R3 Motorsports	Dodge
25	51	Jeremy Clements	Jeremy Clements Racing	Chevrolet
26	39	Danny Efland	Go Green Racing	Ford
27	81	Donnie Neuenberger	MacDonald Motorsports	Dodge
28	28	Derrike Cope	Jay Robinson Racing	Chevrolet
29	70	Dennis Setzer	Jay Robinson Racing	Dodge
30	15	Timmy Hill (R)	Rick Ware Racing	Ford
31	14	Mike Bliss	TriStar Motorsports	Chevrolet
32	64	David Reutimann (i)*	Rusty Wallace Racing	Toyota
33	82	Blake Koch (R)	MacDonald Racing	Dodge
34	79	Tim Andrews	2nd Chance Motorsports	Ford
35	67	J. R. Fitzpatrick	Go Canada Racing	Ford
36	52	Kevin Lepage	Means Motorsports	Chevrolet
37	44	Jeff Green	TriStar Motorsports	Chevrolet
38	89	Morgan Shepherd	Faith Motorsports	Chevrolet
39	55	Brett Rowe	Faith Motorsports	Chevrolet
40	41	Carl Long	Rick Ware Racing	Ford
41	0	Brad Teague	JD Motorsports	Chevrolet
42	04	Charles Lewandoski (R)	Go Green Racing	Ford
43	13	Jennifer Jo Cobb (R)	JJC Racing	Ford
Failed to Qualify, driver changes, or withdrew
WD	68	Matt Carter	Fleur-de-lis Motorsports	Chevrolet
WD	74	Mike Harmon	Mike Harmon Racing	Chevrolet
WD	75	Johnny Chapman	Rick Ware Racing	Ford
Official starting lineup

* - David Reutimann had to start at the rear of the field due to missing the drivers meeting

== Race ==
During the first lap, Ricky Stenhouse Jr. took the lead from pole sitter Carl Edwards. In turn 3, MacDonald Motorsports teammates Donnie Neuenberger and Blake Koch crashed in turn 3 after Neuenberger got spun by Mike Bliss bringing out the first caution of the race. Stenhouse led the first lap. The race got back underway on lap 8 of the race with Stenhouse leading. On lap 20, the second caution came out when Kevin Lepage blew a right front tire and hit the wall in turn 3. On the restart on lap 25, Clint Bowyer took the lead from Stenhouse. Stenhouse took the lead back on lap 30. Bowyer took the lead back on lap 39. 2 laps later, the third caution flew for it being the competition caution. Carl Edwards won the race off of pit road and was the new race leader. Bowyer took the lead from Edwards on the restart. On the next lap, the fourth caution flew when Brian Scott spun out of turn 4 and hit the inside wall. The race restarted on lap 51 with Bowyer leading the race. On lap 75, Edwards took the lead from Bowyer.

On lap 87, one of the strangest crashes in NASCAR history occurred. Alex Kennedy got loose coming out of turn 2 and his car spun and hit the inside wall on the backstretch. His car stopped with the tail of car on the inside wall and the nose of the car pointing towards the outside wall. Kennedy sat there waiting for traffic to clear by so he can get to pit road. Kennedy got his car to start rolling across the track and began to turn the wheel to the left. The car could not turn and Kennedy pulled up right in front of Kevin Swindell and the two crashed into each other head on with Aric Almirola dodging both cars in the crash. The impact broke the front axle of Kennedy's car as it was hanging out of the front of the car. Both drivers walked away but this made Swindell mad since this was a one-off deal with Roush Racing and he was running well after he was filling in for Trevor Bayne due to Bayne feeling ill and his day ended during a caution flag when someone drove across the racetrack right in front of him. The race restarted on lap 101 with Carl Edwards taking the lead from Brad Keselowski. On lap 140, the 6th caution flew when Justin Allgaier blew a right-front tire and hit the wall in turn 3. On lap 145, the red flag was issued due to rain in the area. After a 24-minute red flag, the cars got back on the race track. The race restarted on lap 149 with Carl Edwards leading the field. On the next lap, Logano took the lead from Edwards.

=== Final Laps ===
With 14 laps to go, Edwards took the lead from Logano and built a manageable lead. It looked like Edwards was gonna win the race by a good margin. But with 4 laps to go, Michael Annett crashed on the frontstretch bringing out the 7th caution of the race and setting up a green-white-checkered finish. On the restart, Edwards took the lead from Logano. But as soon as they got the green flag, Eric McClure's car stalled bringing out the 8th caution and setting up a second attempt of a green-white-checkered finish. On the restart, Edwards and Logano began to fight for the lead as they began to race side by side. Logano got a slight advantage down the backstretch trying to take the lead. Edwards got a bit loose in turn 4 and his car came up towards Joey. Logano got loose out of turn 4 and hit the outside wall. Logano came down the racetrack right in front of Clint Bowyer. Bowyer's car ramped over Logano's car, flew in the air and landed on the driver's side of the car then came back on all 4 wheels. During the wreck, a spring flew out of Bowyer's car and struck one of his pit crew members in the leg. While Logano and Bowyer were crashing, other cars behind them checked up and ran into each other causing an 8 car accident on the front stretch. Bowyer's car also took another shot by Steve Wallace after Wallace spun trying to check up and avoid the crash. The white flag had already flown before the 9th and final caution came out for the massive accident on the front stretch. The cars involved were Joey Logano, Clint Bowyer, Steve Wallace, Kenny Wallace, Mike Bliss, Kyle Busch, Brad Keselowski, and Aric Almirola. The race finished under caution and Carl Edwards won the race. After Edwards took the checkered flag, he went over to Logano after Logano climbed out of his car to see if he was ok and also talk about what happened when Joey spun out off of turn 4 that triggered the massive crash. The two calmly talked for about 11 seconds and Edwards drove his car to victory lane. Replays showed that Logano's car spun in 4 but Edwards appeared to never make any contact with Logano's car. Bowyer's crew member that was struck by debris was taken to the infield care center where he would be ok. Everyone else that was involved in the wreck would be ok. Despite a pretty damaged front end of his racecar after being caught up in the wreck, Kyle Busch finished runner up. Reed Sorenson, Ricky Stenhouse Jr., and David Reutimann rounded out the top 5 while Elliott Sadler, Kenny Wallace, James Buescher, Aric Almirola, and Mike Wallace rounded out the top 10.

== Race results ==
Pos	Car	Driver	Team	Manufacturer	Laps Run	Laps Led	Status	Points
1	60	Carl Edwards (i)	Roush Fenway Racing	Ford	209	87	running	0
2	18	Kyle Busch (i)	Joe Gibbs Racing	Toyota	209	0	running	0
3	32	Reed Sorenson	Turner Motorsports	Chevrolet	209	0	running	41
4	6	Ricky Stenhouse Jr.	Roush Fenway Racing	Ford	209	33	running	41
5	64	David Reutimann (i)	Rusty Wallace Racing	Toyota	209	0	running	0
6	2	Elliott Sadler	Kevin Harvick Inc.	Chevrolet	209	0	running	38
7	09	Kenny Wallace	RAB Racing	Toyota	209	0	running	37
8	30	James Buscher (i)	Turner Motorsports	Chevrolet	209	0	running	0
9	88	Aric Almirola	JR Motorsports	Chevrolet	209	0	running	35
10	01	Mike Wallace	JD Motorsports	Chevrolet	209	0	running	34
11	38	Jason Leffler	Turner Motorsports	Chevrolet	209	0	running	33
12	22	Brad Keselowski (i)	Penske Racing	Dodge	208	8	crash	0
13	20	Joey Logano (i)	Joe Gibbs Racing	Toyota	208	37	crash	0
14	33	Clint Bowyer (i)	Kevin Harvick Inc.	Chevrolet	208	37	crash	0
15	14	Mike Bliss	TriStar Motorsports	Chevrolet	208	0	crash	29
16	66	Steve Wallace	Rusty Wallace Racing	Toyota	208	0	crash	28
17	7	Josh Wise	JR Motorsports	Chevrolet	208	5	running	28
18	99	Ryan Truex (R)	Pastrana-Waltrip Racing	Toyota	207	0	running	26
19	87	Joe Nemechek	NEMCO Motorsports	Toyota	207	0	running	25
20	62	Michael Annett	Rusty Wallace Racing	Toyota	205	0	running	24
21	67	J. R. Fitzpatrick	Go Canada Racing	Ford	204	0	running	23
22	15	Timmy Hill (R)	Rick Ware Racing	Ford	204	0	running	22
23	39	Danny Efland	Go Green Racing	Ford	203	0	running	21
24	51	Jeremy Clements	Jeremy Clements Racing	Chevrolet	202	0	running	20
25	19	Eric McClure	TriStar Motorsports	Chevrolet	201	0	running	19
26	89	Morgan Shepherd	Faith Motorsports	Chevrolet	184	0	running	18
27	28	Derrike Cope	Jay Robinson Racing	Chevrolet	166	0	engine	17
28	70	Dennis Setzer	Jay Robinson Racing	Dodge	140	0	electrical	16
29	31	Justin Allgaier	Turner Motorsports	Chevrolet	138	0	crash	15
30	11	Brian Scott	Joe Gibbs Racing	Toyota	87	0	crash	14
31	16	Kevin Swindell	Roush Fenway Racing	Ford	86	0	crash	13
32	23	Alex Kennedy	R3 Motorsports	Dodge	84	0	crash	12
33	81	Donnie Neuenberger	MacDonald Motorsports	Dodge	70	0	too slow	11
34	41	Carl Long	Rick Ware Racing	Ford	52	0	rear gear	10
35	40	Scott Wimmer	Key Motorsports	Chevrolet	44	2	transmission	10
36	79	Tim Andrews	2nd Chance Motorsports	Chevrolet	44	0	transmission	8
37	13	Jennifer Jo Cobb (R)	JJC Racing	Ford	43	0	axle	7
38	52	Kevin Lepage	Means Motorsports	Chevrolet	19	0	crash	6
39	0	Brad Teague	JD Motorsports	Chevrolet	10	0	engine	5
40	55	Brett Rowe	Faith Motorsports	Chevrolet	7	0	handling	4
41	44	Jeff Green	TriStar Motorsports	Chevrolet	6	0	vibration	3
42	04	Charles Lewandoski (R)	Go Green Racing	Ford	4	0	ignition	2
43	82	Blake Koch (R)	MacDonald Motorsports	Dodge	1	0	crash	1
Official Race Results

Previous race: 2011 Royal Purple 200	NASCAR Nationwide Series; 2011 season	Next race: 2011 Iowa John Deere Dealers 250
