= 2013 NASCAR Nationwide Series =

American motorsport season

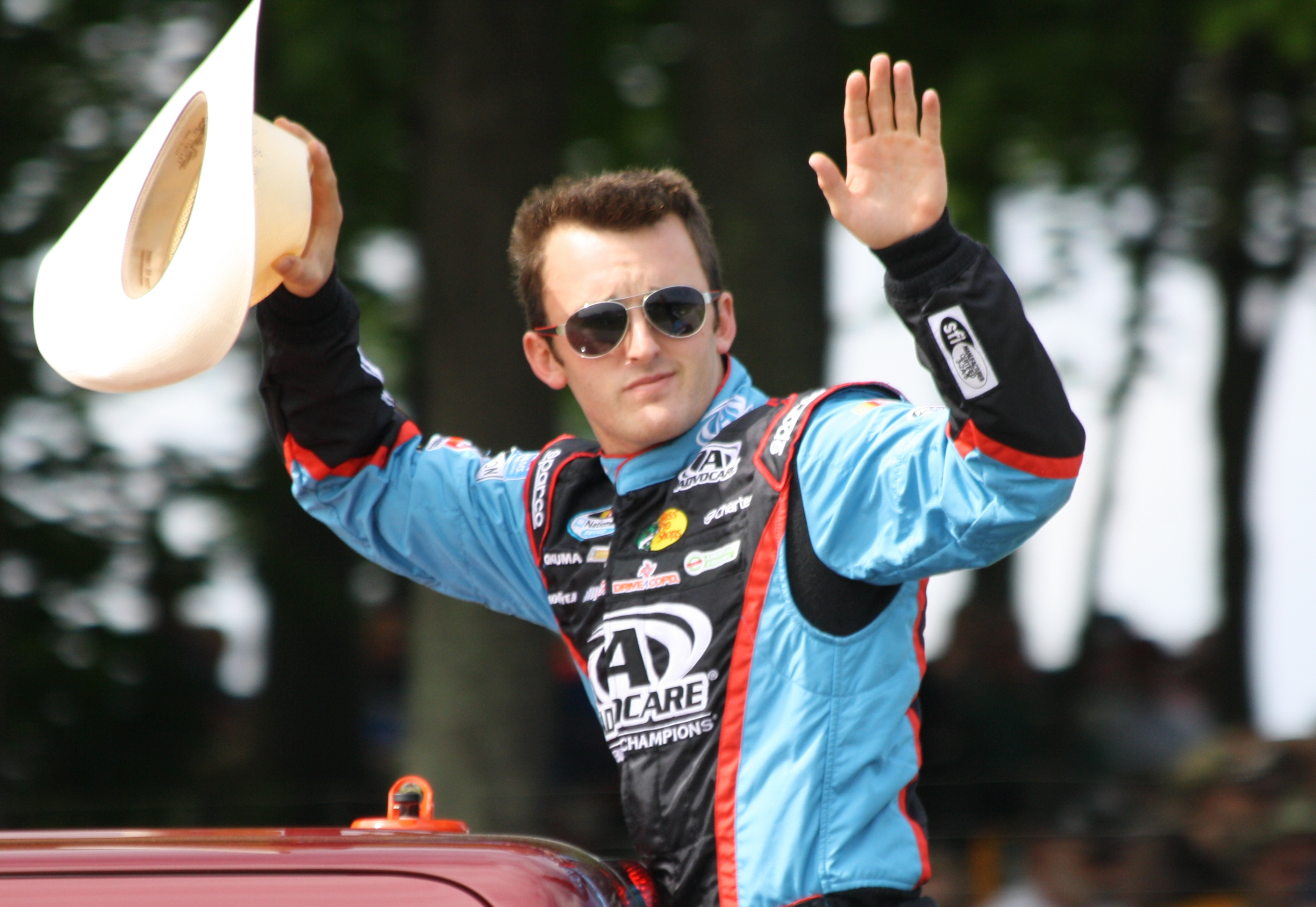
Austin Dillon, the 2013 Nationwide Series champion.

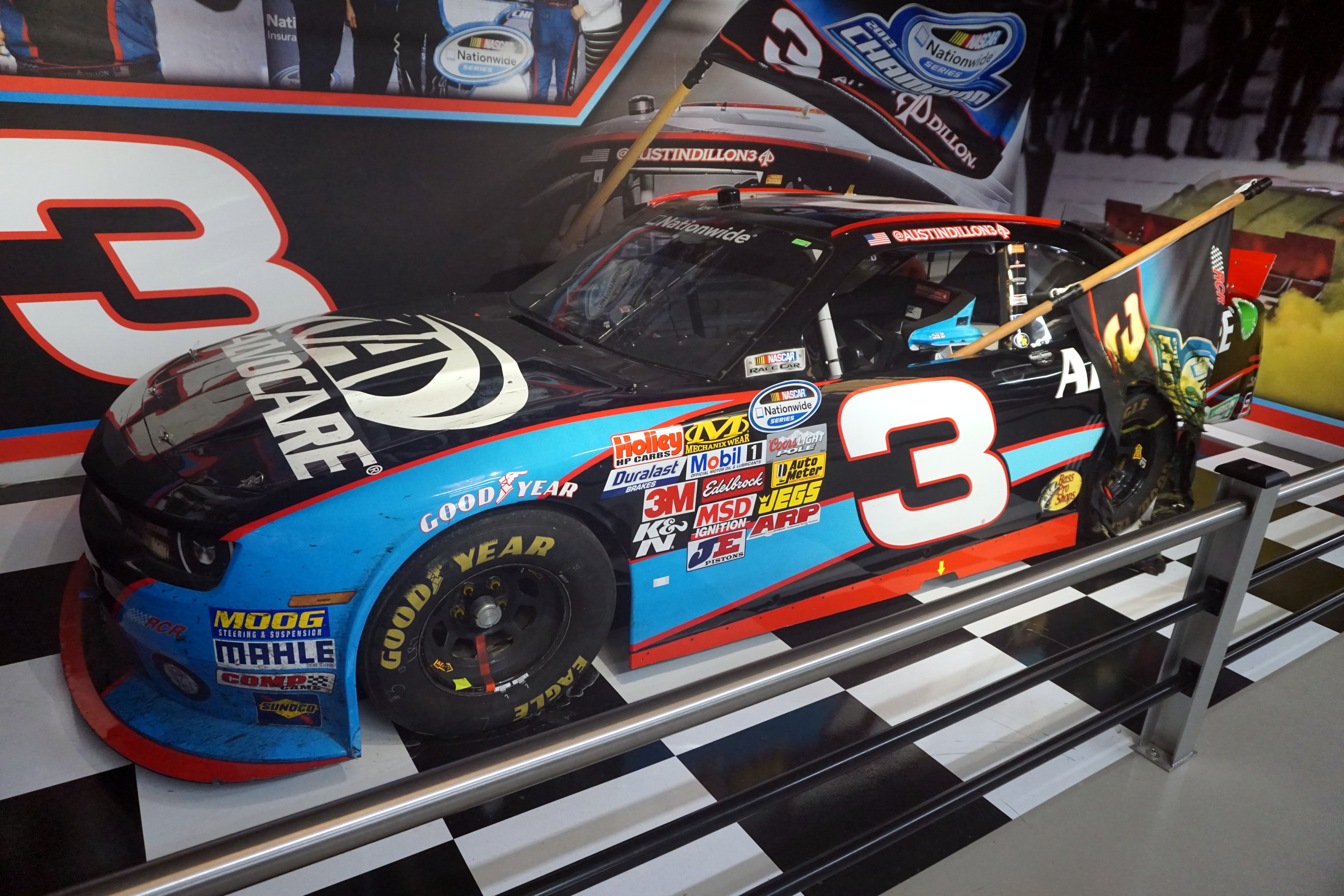
Austin Dillon's 2013 NASCAR Nationwide Series-champion No. 3 AdvoCare Chevrolet Camaro

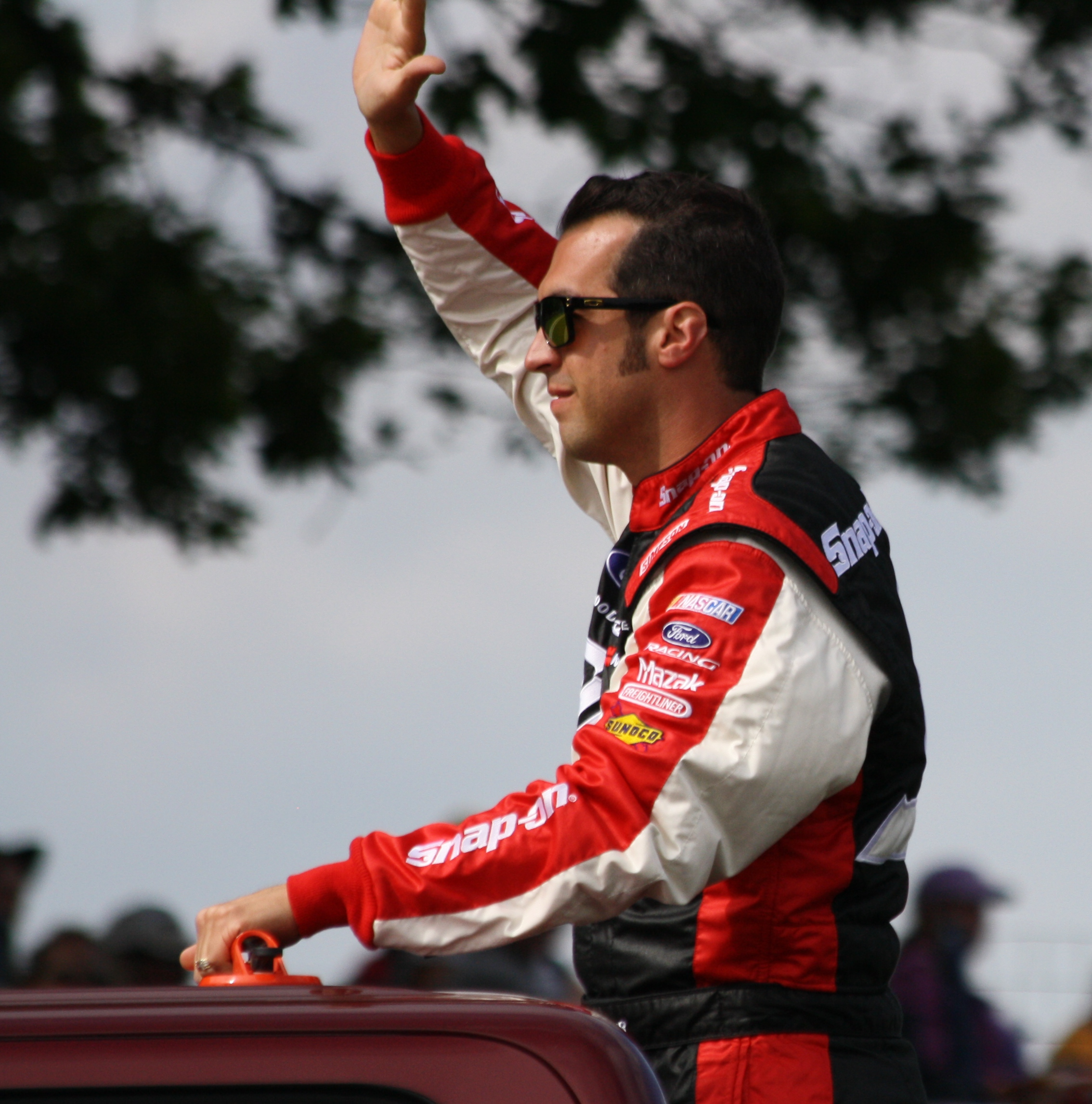
Sam Hornish Jr. finished second behind Dillon in the championship by just three points.

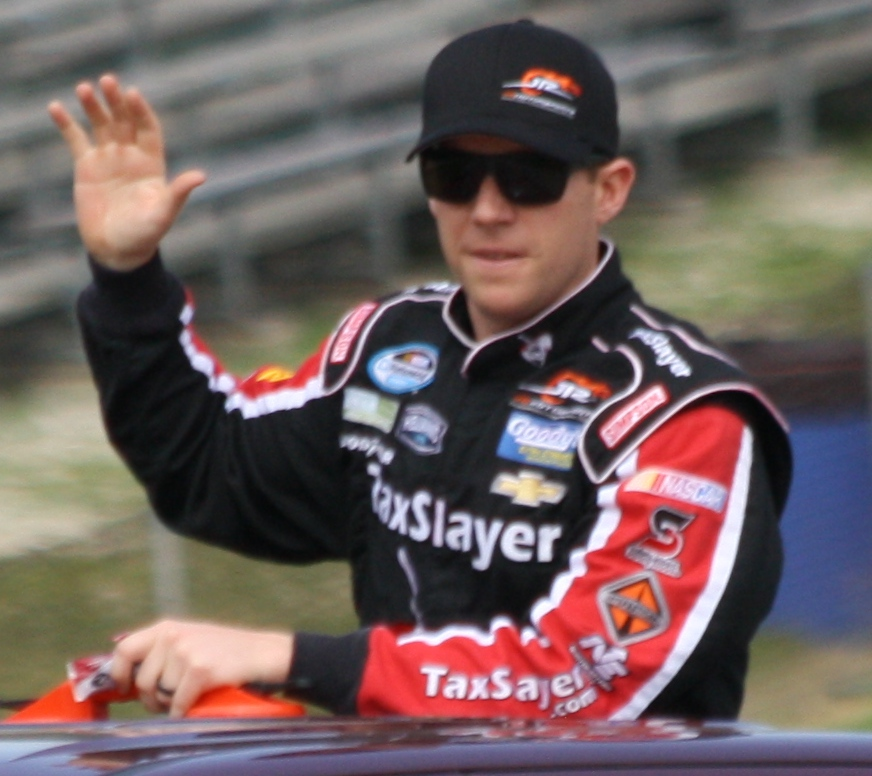
Regan Smith finished third in the championship, 72 points behind Dillon.

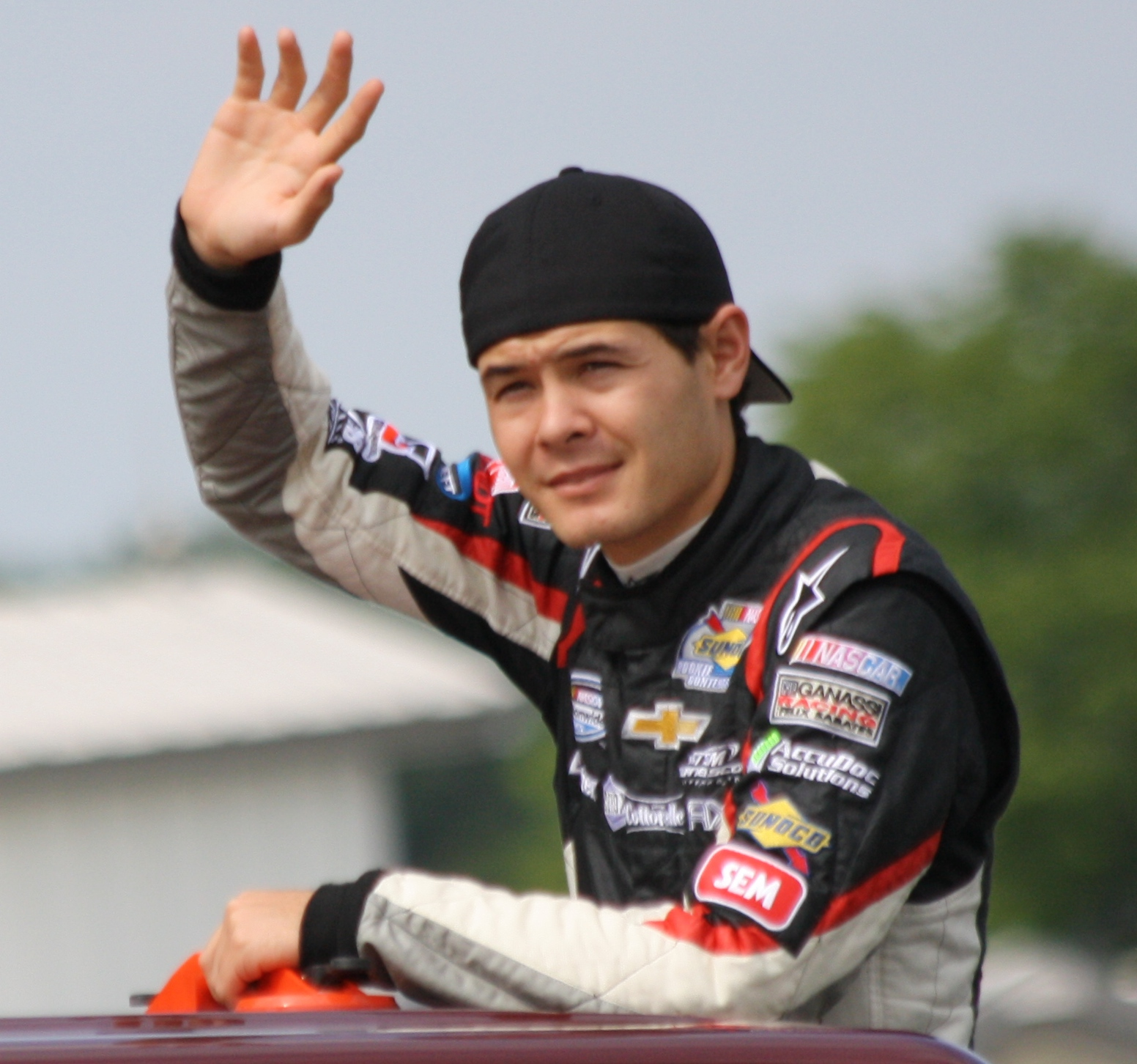
Kyle Larson, the 2013 Nationwide Series Rookie of the Year.

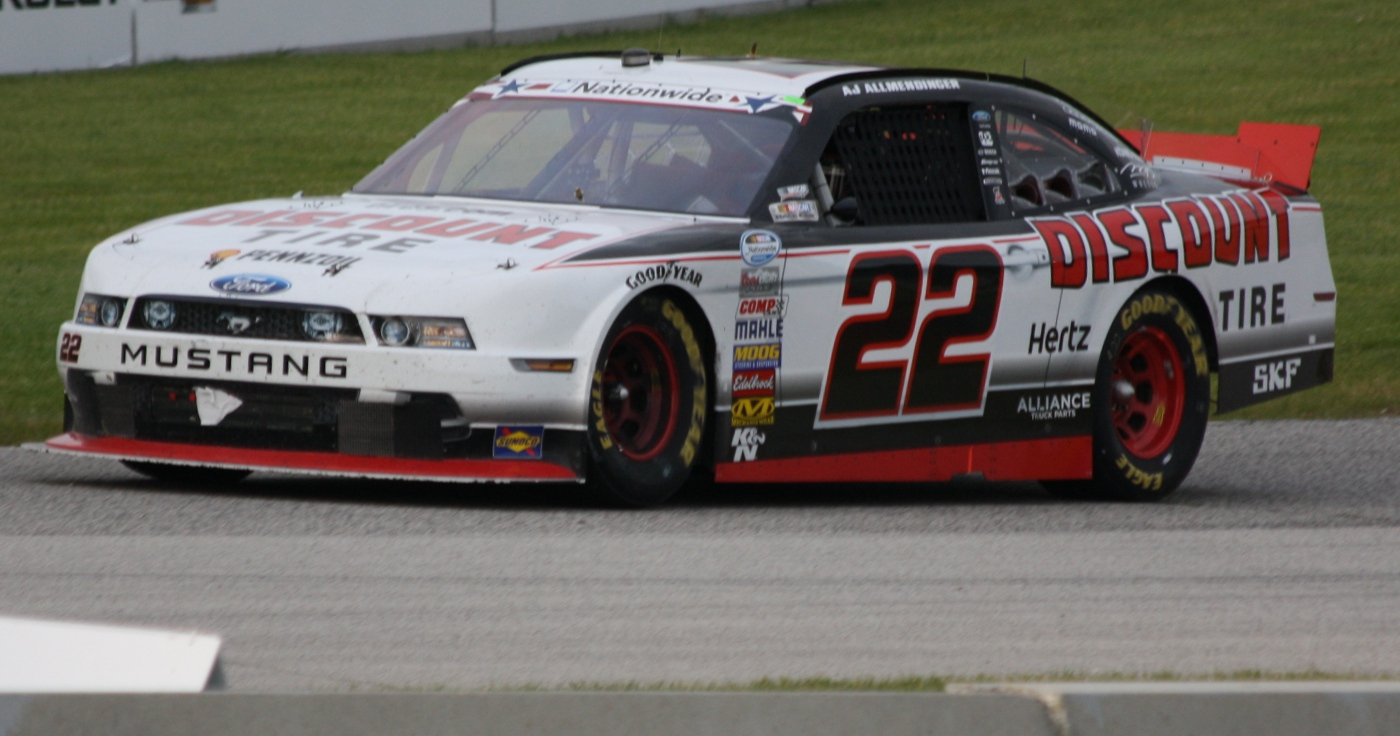
Penske Racing's No. 22 entry won the 2013 owners' championship; Ford won the manufacturer's championship

The 2013 NASCAR Nationwide Series was the 32nd season of the NASCAR Nationwide Series, the second national professional stock car racing series sanctioned by NASCAR in the United States. The season was contested over thirty-three races and started on February 23, 2013 at Daytona International Speedway, with the DRIVE4COPD 300, and ended on November 16 with the Ford EcoBoost 300 at Homestead–Miami Speedway. Austin Dillon of Richard Childress Racing won the Drivers' Championship, becoming the first driver in the three major NASCAR series to do so without recording a win. The No. 22 entry of Penske Racing won the Owners' Championship, while Ford won the Manufacturers' Championship.

== Teams and drivers ==
=== Complete schedule ===
Team	Manufacturer	No.	Race Driver	Crew Chief
Go Green Racing	Ford	79	Jeffrey Earnhardt (R)16	Mark Durgin; Ben Leslie
Go Green Racing	Ford	79	Paulie Harraka1	Mark Durgin; Ben Leslie
Go Green Racing	Ford	79	Joey Gase2	Mark Durgin; Ben Leslie
Go Green Racing	Ford	79	Kyle Fowler7	Mark Durgin; Ben Leslie
Go Green Racing	Ford	79	Bryan Silas6	Mark Durgin; Ben Leslie
Go Green Racing	Ford	79	Maryeve Dufault1	Mark Durgin; Ben Leslie
Go Green Racing	Ford	79	T. J. Duke1	Mark Durgin; Ben Leslie
Harmon-Novak Racing	Dodge13; Chevrolet20	74	Mike Harmon9	Dave Fuge Jr. Gregg Mixon; Carl Long; Dave Goulet; Mike Harmon
Harmon-Novak Racing	Dodge13; Chevrolet20	74	Kevin Lepage6	Dave Fuge Jr. Gregg Mixon; Carl Long; Dave Goulet; Mike Harmon
Harmon-Novak Racing	Dodge13; Chevrolet20	74	Juan Carlos Blum (R)4	Dave Fuge Jr. Gregg Mixon; Carl Long; Dave Goulet; Mike Harmon
Harmon-Novak Racing	Dodge13; Chevrolet20	74	Danny Efland2	Dave Fuge Jr. Gregg Mixon; Carl Long; Dave Goulet; Mike Harmon
Harmon-Novak Racing	Dodge13; Chevrolet20	74	Kevin O'Connell2	Dave Fuge Jr. Gregg Mixon; Carl Long; Dave Goulet; Mike Harmon
Harmon-Novak Racing	Dodge13; Chevrolet20	74	Carl Long10	Dave Fuge Jr. Gregg Mixon; Carl Long; Dave Goulet; Mike Harmon
JD Motorsports	Chevrolet	01	Mike Wallace	Marc Browning; Johnny Davis; Dave Fuge
JD Motorsports	Chevrolet	4	Danny Efland2	Dave Smith; Johnny Davis; Kertus Davis; Marc Browning; Patrick Magee; Carl Harr; Clinton Cram
JD Motorsports	Chevrolet	4	Daryl Harr6	Dave Smith; Johnny Davis; Kertus Davis; Marc Browning; Patrick Magee; Carl Harr; Clinton Cram
JD Motorsports	Chevrolet	4	Landon Cassill23	Dave Smith; Johnny Davis; Kertus Davis; Marc Browning; Patrick Magee; Carl Harr; Clinton Cram
JD Motorsports	Chevrolet	4	Kevin Lepage2	Dave Smith; Johnny Davis; Kertus Davis; Marc Browning; Patrick Magee; Carl Harr; Clinton Cram
Jeremy Clements Racing	Chevrolet	51	Jeremy Clements31	Nick Harrison; Ricky Pearson; Eddie Pearson
Jeremy Clements Racing	Chevrolet	51	Ryan Sieg2	Nick Harrison; Ricky Pearson; Eddie Pearson
Joe Gibbs Racing	Toyota	11	Elliott Sadler	Chris Gayle
Joe Gibbs Racing	Toyota	20	Brian Vickers30	Kevin Kidd
Joe Gibbs Racing	Toyota	20	Denny Hamlin1	Kevin Kidd
Joe Gibbs Racing	Toyota	20	Drew Herring2	Kevin Kidd
Joe Gibbs Racing	Toyota	54	Kyle Busch26	Adam Stevens
Joe Gibbs Racing	Toyota	54	Joey Coulter2	Adam Stevens
Joe Gibbs Racing	Toyota	54	Drew Herring3	Adam Stevens
Joe Gibbs Racing	Toyota	54	Owen Kelly2	Adam Stevens
JR Motorsports	Chevrolet	5	Kasey Kahne11	Mike Bumgarner
JR Motorsports	Chevrolet	5	Jimmie Johnson1	Mike Bumgarner
JR Motorsports	Chevrolet	5	Brad Sweet17	Mike Bumgarner
JR Motorsports	Chevrolet	5	Jeffrey Earnhardt (R)1	Mike Bumgarner
JR Motorsports	Chevrolet	5	Johnny O'Connell1	Mike Bumgarner
JR Motorsports	Chevrolet	5	Ron Fellows1	Mike Bumgarner
JR Motorsports	Chevrolet	5	Jamie McMurray1	Mike Bumgarner
JR Motorsports	Chevrolet	7	Regan Smith	Greg Ives
Kyle Busch Motorsports	Toyota	77	Parker Kligerman	Eric Phillips
ML Motorsports	Chevrolet	70	Johanna Long20	Mark Gutekunst
ML Motorsports	Chevrolet	70	Derrike Cope1	Mark Gutekunst; Jay Robinson
Jay Robinson Racing	Toyota	70	Brad Teague3	Mark Gutekunst; Jay Robinson
Jay Robinson Racing	Toyota	70	Tony Raines7	Mark Gutekunst; Jay Robinson
Jay Robinson Racing	Toyota	70	Jeff Green1	Mark Gutekunst; Jay Robinson
Jay Robinson Racing	Toyota	70	Tomy Drissi1	Mark Gutekunst; Jay Robinson
NEMCO Motorsports	Toyota	87	Joe Nemechek28	Steven Gray
NEMCO Motorsports	Toyota	87	Kevin Lepage1	Steven Gray
NEMCO Motorsports	Toyota	87	Travis Sauter1	Steven Gray
Team Kelley Racing	Chevrolet	87	Kyle Kelley3	Steven Gray
Penske Racing	Ford	12	Sam Hornish Jr.	Greg Erwin
Penske Racing	Ford	22	Brad Keselowski15	Jeremy Bullins
Penske Racing	Ford	22	Joey Logano14	Jeremy Bullins
Penske Racing	Ford	22	Ryan Blaney2	Jeremy Bullins
Penske Racing	Ford	22	A. J. Allmendinger2	Jeremy Bullins
RAB Racing	Toyota	99	Alex Bowman (R)32	Chris Rice
RAB Racing	Toyota	99	Blake Koch1	Chris Rice
Richard Childress Racing	Chevrolet	2	Brian Scott	Phil Gould
Richard Childress Racing	Chevrolet	3	Austin Dillon	Danny Stockman Jr.
Richard Childress Racing	Chevrolet	33	Tony Stewart1	Ernie Cope; Nick Harrison
Richard Childress Racing	Chevrolet	33	Kevin Harvick10	Ernie Cope; Nick Harrison
Richard Childress Racing	Chevrolet	33	Ty Dillon9	Ernie Cope; Nick Harrison
Richard Childress Racing	Chevrolet	33	Dakoda Armstrong1	Ernie Cope; Nick Harrison
Richard Childress Racing	Chevrolet	33	Max Papis3	Ernie Cope; Nick Harrison
Richard Childress Racing	Chevrolet	33	Paul Menard4	Ernie Cope; Nick Harrison
Richard Childress Racing	Chevrolet	33	Matt Crafton3	Ernie Cope; Nick Harrison
Richard Childress Racing	Chevrolet	33	Ryan Gifford1	Ernie Cope; Nick Harrison
Richard Childress Racing	Chevrolet	33	Brendan Gaughan1	Ernie Cope; Nick Harrison
Richard Petty Motorsports	Ford	43	Michael Annett25	Philippe Lopez
Richard Petty Motorsports	Ford	43	Aric Almirola1	Philippe Lopez
Richard Petty Motorsports	Ford	43	Reed Sorenson7	Philippe Lopez
R3 Motorsports	Chevrolet; Ford	23	Robert Richardson Jr.14	Sterling Laughlin; George Church; Walter Giles; Ben Leslie; Tony Eury, Sr.
Rick Ware Racing	Chevrolet; Ford	23	Harrison Rhodes7	Sterling Laughlin; George Church; Walter Giles; Ben Leslie; Tony Eury, Sr.
Rick Ware Racing	Chevrolet; Ford	23	Carl Long1	Sterling Laughlin; George Church; Walter Giles; Ben Leslie; Tony Eury, Sr.
Rick Ware Racing	Chevrolet; Ford	23	Scott Riggs1	Sterling Laughlin; George Church; Walter Giles; Ben Leslie; Tony Eury, Sr.
Rick Ware Racing	Chevrolet; Ford	23	Stanton Barrett2	Sterling Laughlin; George Church; Walter Giles; Ben Leslie; Tony Eury, Sr.
Rick Ware Racing	Chevrolet; Ford	23	Richard Harriman1	Sterling Laughlin; George Church; Walter Giles; Ben Leslie; Tony Eury, Sr.
Rick Ware Racing	Chevrolet; Ford	23	Anthony Gandon2	Sterling Laughlin; George Church; Walter Giles; Ben Leslie; Tony Eury, Sr.
Rick Ware Racing	Chevrolet; Ford	23	Juan Carlos Blum1	Sterling Laughlin; George Church; Walter Giles; Ben Leslie; Tony Eury, Sr.
Rick Ware Racing	Chevrolet; Ford	23	Donnie Neuenberger1	Sterling Laughlin; George Church; Walter Giles; Ben Leslie; Tony Eury, Sr.
Rick Ware Racing	Chevrolet; Ford	23	Jennifer Jo Cobb1	Sterling Laughlin; George Church; Walter Giles; Ben Leslie; Tony Eury, Sr.
Rick Ware Racing	Chevrolet; Ford	23	Timmy Hill2	Sterling Laughlin; George Church; Walter Giles; Ben Leslie; Tony Eury, Sr.
Roush Fenway Racing	Ford	6	Trevor Bayne	Mike Kelley; Seth Barbour
Roush Fenway Racing	Ford	60	Travis Pastrana	Chad Norris
SR² Motorsports	Toyota	24	Blake Koch10	Benny Gordon; Chris Wright; John Monsam; Bobby Burrell
SR² Motorsports	Toyota	24	Jason White4	Benny Gordon; Chris Wright; John Monsam; Bobby Burrell
SR² Motorsports	Toyota	24	Bryan Silas1	Benny Gordon; Chris Wright; John Monsam; Bobby Burrell
SR² Motorsports	Toyota	24	Ken Butler III6	Benny Gordon; Chris Wright; John Monsam; Bobby Burrell
SR² Motorsports	Toyota	24	Derek White2	Benny Gordon; Chris Wright; John Monsam; Bobby Burrell
SR² Motorsports	Toyota	24	Brett Butler3	Benny Gordon; Chris Wright; John Monsam; Bobby Burrell
SR² Motorsports	Toyota	24	Alex Kennedy1	Benny Gordon; Chris Wright; John Monsam; Bobby Burrell
SR² Motorsports	Toyota	24	Ryan Ellis5	Benny Gordon; Chris Wright; John Monsam; Bobby Burrell
SR² Motorsports	Toyota	24	Kelly Admiraal1	Benny Gordon; Chris Wright; John Monsam; Bobby Burrell
The Motorsports Group	Chevrolet	40	Reed Sorenson20	Curtis Key, Sr. Gary Showalter
The Motorsports Group	Chevrolet	40	Josh Wise7	Curtis Key, Sr. Gary Showalter
The Motorsports Group	Chevrolet	40	T. J. Bell6	Curtis Key, Sr. Gary Showalter
TriStar Motorsports	Toyota	14	Eric McClure27	John Monsam; Todd Myers
TriStar Motorsports	Toyota	14	Jeff Green6	John Monsam; Todd Myers
TriStar Motorsports	Toyota	19	Mike Bliss32	Paul Clapprood
TriStar Motorsports	Toyota	19	Dakoda Armstrong1	Paul Clapprood
TriStar Motorsports	Toyota	44	Hal Martin (R)12	Greg Conner; Randy Cox
TriStar Motorsports	Toyota	44	Cole Whitt14	Greg Conner; Randy Cox
TriStar Motorsports	Toyota	44	Chad Hackenbracht7	Greg Conner; Randy Cox
Turner Scott Motorsports	Chevrolet	30	Nelson Piquet Jr. (R)	Chris Carrier; Pat Tryson
Turner Scott Motorsports	Chevrolet	31	Justin Allgaier	Scott Zipadelli
Turner Scott Motorsports	Chevrolet	32	Kyle Larson (R)	Trent Owens

=== Limited schedule ===
Team	Manufacturer	No.	Race Driver	Crew Chief	Rounds
Biagi-DenBeste Racing	Ford	98	Kevin Swindell (R)	Jon Hanson	15
Creation-Cope Racing	Chevrolet	73	Derrike Cope	Jacob Richardson	4
Creation-Cope Racing	Chevrolet	73	Alx Danielsson	Jacob Richardson	1
Deware Racing Group	Ford	86	Tim Cowen	Larry Balsitis	1
Deware Racing Group	Chevrolet	86	Kevin Lepage	Larry Balsitis	1
Deware Racing Group	Chevrolet	86	Ricky Ehrgott	Rick Markle	1
DGM Racing	Chevrolet	90	Martin Roy	Mario Gosselin	1
Gerhart Racing	Chevrolet	85	Bobby Gerhart	Billy Gerhart; Mark Skibo	3
Hamilton Means Racing	Toyota; Chevrolet	52	Joey Gase	Timothy Brown	25
Hamilton Means Racing	Toyota; Chevrolet	52	Derek Thorn	Timothy Brown	1
Hamilton Means Racing	Toyota; Chevrolet	52	Donnie Neuenberger	Timothy Brown	1
Hamilton Means Racing	Toyota; Chevrolet	52	Kevin Lepage	Timothy Brown	1
Hamilton Means Racing	Toyota; Chevrolet	52	Tim Schendel	Timothy Brown	1
Hamilton Means Racing	Toyota; Chevrolet	52	Ryan Ellis	Timothy Brown	1
Joe Gibbs Racing	Toyota	18	Matt Kenseth	Matt Lucas	16
Joe Gibbs Racing	Toyota	18	Michael McDowell	Matt Lucas	2
Joe Gibbs Racing	Toyota	18	Drew Herring	Matt Lucas	1
Joe Gibbs Racing	Toyota	18	Joey Coulter	Matt Lucas	1
JR Motorsports	Chevrolet	88	Dale Earnhardt Jr.	Ryan Pemberton; Steve Letarte	4
KH Motorsports	Ford	92	Dexter Stacey (R)	George Ingram	21
KH Motorsports	Ford	92	Tim Andrews	George Ingram	2
Leavine Family Racing	Ford	95	Reed Sorenson	Wally Rogers	1
MAKE Motorsports	Chevrolet	50	Danny Efland	Perry Mitchell	6
NDS Motorsports	Dodge	53	Andrew Ranger	Zach D'Ambra; Michael Sibley	3
Penske Racing	Ford	48	Joey Logano	Kevin Buskirk	1
Penske Racing	Ford	48	Ryan Blaney	Kevin Buskirk	1
Penske Racing	Ford	48	Brad Keselowski	Kevin Buskirk	1
Phoenix Racing	Chevrolet	1	Kurt Busch	Nick Harrison	3
RAB Racing	Toyota	29	Kenny Wallace	Robby Benton; Keith Hinkein	7
Richard Childress Racing	Chevrolet	21	Brendan Gaughan	Shane Wilson; Marcus Richmond	3
Richard Childress Racing	Chevrolet	21	Dakoda Armstrong	Shane Wilson; Marcus Richmond	4
Richard Childress Racing	Chevrolet	21	Kevin Harvick	Shane Wilson; Marcus Richmond	1
Richard Petty Motorsports	Ford	9	Marcos Ambrose	Seth Barbour	1
Richard Petty Motorsports	Ford	9	Corey LaJoie	Mike Shiplett	1
Rick Ware Racing	Ford; Chevrolet	15	Juan Carlos Blum (R)	George Church; Sterling Laughlin; Stephen Steffy; Gordon Austin	5
Rick Ware Racing	Ford; Chevrolet	15	Scott Riggs	George Church; Sterling Laughlin; Stephen Steffy; Gordon Austin	1
Rick Ware Racing	Ford; Chevrolet	15	Stanton Barrett	George Church; Sterling Laughlin; Stephen Steffy; Gordon Austin	3
Rick Ware Racing	Ford; Chevrolet	15	Carl Long	George Church; Sterling Laughlin; Stephen Steffy; Gordon Austin	6
Rick Ware Racing	Ford; Chevrolet	15	Chase Miller	George Church; Sterling Laughlin; Stephen Steffy; Gordon Austin	2
Roush Fenway Racing	Ford	16	Chris Buescher	Seth Barbour; Robbie Reiser	7
Roush Fenway Racing	Ford	16	Ryan Reed	Seth Barbour; Robbie Reiser	6
Roush Fenway Racing	Ford	16	Billy Johnson	Seth Barbour; Robbie Reiser	2
Roush Fenway Racing	Ford	16	Ricky Stenhouse Jr.	Seth Barbour; Robbie Reiser	1
RSS Racing	Chevrolet	39	Ryan Sieg	Kevin Starland	2
Rusty Wallace Racing	Ford	66	Steve Wallace	Blake Bainbridge	1
Shepherd Racing Ventures	Dodge; Chevrolet	89	Morgan Shepherd	Lucas Bowman; Mike Malamphy; Claude Townsend	19
SR² Motorsports	Toyota	00	Jason White	Jamie Lathrop; Newt Moore; Kevin Eagle; J.C. Hall	5
SR² Motorsports	Toyota	00	Blake Koch	Jamie Lathrop; Newt Moore; Kevin Eagle; J.C. Hall	18
SR² Motorsports	Toyota	00	Bryan Silas	Jamie Lathrop; Newt Moore; Kevin Eagle; J.C. Hall	1
SR² Motorsports	Toyota	00	Ken Butler III	Jamie Lathrop; Newt Moore; Kevin Eagle; J.C. Hall	2
SR² Motorsports	Toyota	00	David Green	Jamie Lathrop; Newt Moore; Kevin Eagle; J.C. Hall	1
SR² Motorsports	Toyota	00	Brett Butler	Jamie Lathrop; Newt Moore; Kevin Eagle; J.C. Hall	1
SR² Motorsports	Toyota	00	Michael McDowell	Jamie Lathrop; Newt Moore; Kevin Eagle; J.C. Hall	5
SR² Motorsports	Toyota	27	Michael McDowell	Kevin Eagle	5
SR² Motorsports	Toyota	27	Jason White	Kevin Eagle	1
SunEnergy1 Racing	Toyota	75	Kenny Habul	Bryan Berry; Matt Lucas	3
TeamSLR Tommy Baldwin Racing	Chevrolet	8	Scott Lagasse Jr.	Brad Parrott	3
TeamSLR Tommy Baldwin Racing	Chevrolet	8	Ryan Preece	Zach McGowan	1
The Motorsports Group	Chevrolet	42	Josh Wise	Curtis Key, Sr. Mike Sroufe	17
The Motorsports Group	Chevrolet	42	J. J. Yeley	Curtis Key, Sr. Mike Sroufe	6
The Motorsports Group	Chevrolet	42	T. J. Bell	Curtis Key, Sr. Mike Sroufe	5
The Motorsports Group	Chevrolet	42	Chase Miller	Steven Maynard; Mike Sroufe; Derek Seyerle	7
The Motorsports Group	Chevrolet	46	Chase Miller	Steven Maynard; Mike Sroufe; Derek Seyerle	7
The Motorsports Group	Chevrolet	46	J. J. Yeley	David Jones	11
The Motorsports Group	Chevrolet	46	T. J. Bell	David Jones	1
The Motorsports Group	Chevrolet	46	Dexter Stacey (R)	David Jones	1
The Motorsports Group	Chevrolet	46	Matt DiBenedetto	David Jones	1
The Motorsports Group	Chevrolet	46	Tim Schendel	David Jones	1
The Motorsports Group	Chevrolet	46	Jason Bowles	Derek Seyerle	2
The Motorsports Group	Chevrolet	47	Jason Bowles	Steven Maynard	2
The Motorsports Group	Chevrolet	47	Scott Riggs	Steven Maynard	2
TriStar Motorsports	Toyota	10	Jeff Green	Todd Myers; Greg Conner; Blake Climo; Larry Wilcox; Randy Cox	25
TriStar Motorsports	Toyota	10	Chase Miller	Todd Myers; Greg Conner; Blake Climo; Larry Wilcox; Randy Cox	3
TriStar Motorsports	Toyota	10	Cole Whitt	Todd Myers; Greg Conner; Blake Climo; Larry Wilcox; Randy Cox	1
TriStar Motorsports	Toyota	10	Mike Bliss	Todd Myers; Greg Conner; Blake Climo; Larry Wilcox; Randy Cox	1
TriStar Motorsports	Toyota	10	Michael McDowell	Todd Myers; Greg Conner; Blake Climo; Larry Wilcox; Randy Cox	1
TriStar Motorsports	Toyota	91	Michael McDowell	Todd Myers	1
TriStar Motorsports	Toyota	91	Chase Miller	Blake Climo	1
Turner Scott Motorsports	Chevrolet	34	Danica Patrick	Mike Greci	2
Turner Scott Motorsports	Chevrolet	34	James Buescher	Michael Shelton	4
Turner Scott Motorsports	Chevrolet	34	Jeb Burton	Mike Hillman Jr.	1
Venturini Motorsports	Toyota	25	John Wes Townley	Dan Deeringhoff	3
Vision Racing	Toyota; Dodge	17	Tanner Berryhill	Dave Goulet; Benny Gordon	6
Vision Racing	Toyota; Dodge	17	David Starr	Dave Goulet; Benny Gordon	1
Vision Racing	Dodge	37	Matt DiBenedetto	Dave Goulet; Benny Gordon; Adrian Berryhill	7
Vision Racing	Dodge	37	Tanner Berryhill	Dave Goulet; Benny Gordon; Adrian Berryhill	1
Viva Motorsports with Frank Cicci	Chevrolet	55	Jamie Dick	Jason Miller	17
Viva Motorsports with Frank Cicci	Chevrolet	55	David Starr	Jason Miller	2
Young Racing	Dodge	26	John Young	Ed Ash	1

=== Driver changes ===
The 2013 season sees significant driver changes. With Nationwide champion Ricky Stenhouse Jr. moving to the Sprint Cup Series with Roush Fenway Racing, Trevor Bayne, who ran a partial Nationwide schedule with Roush, inherited the No. 6 Ford for 2013. Runner-up Elliott Sadler announced his departure from Richard Childress Racing in 2012, and signed to drive for Joe Gibbs Racing full-time in the No. 11 Toyota. In addition to Sadler, Brian Vickers, after running a partial Cup schedule, return to the Nationwide Series full-time for the first time since his championship season in 2003. JGR's former driver Brian Scott took over Elliott Sadler's old No. 2 ride at RCR, signing a multi-year deal with the team. Truck Series driver Parker Kligerman signed with Kyle Busch Motorsports for 2013, driving the No. 77 Toyota for the season. Former Sprint Cup driver Regan Smith drove the full season for JR Motorsports in the No. 7, replacing Danica Patrick. Kasey Kahne and his USAC driver Brad Sweet also moved from Turner Motorsports to JRM, sharing the No. 5 Camaro for the season. TriStar Motorsports fielded a car for Louisiana native Hal Martin, running for Rookie of the Year. Jeffrey Earnhardt, after driving a limited schedule, drove the full season with Go Green Racing.

== Schedule ==
The final calendar was released on November 13, 2012, containing 33 races.

No.	Race title	Track	Location	Date
1	DRIVE4COPD 300	Daytona International Speedway	Daytona Beach, Florida	February 23
2	Dollar General 200	Phoenix International Raceway	Avondale, Arizona	March 2
3	Sam's Town 300	Las Vegas Motor Speedway	Las Vegas, Nevada	March 9
4	Jeff Foxworthy's Grit Chips 300	Bristol Motor Speedway	Bristol, Tennessee	March 16
5	Royal Purple 300	Auto Club Speedway	Fontana, California	March 23
6	O'Reilly Auto Parts 300	Texas Motor Speedway	Fort Worth, Texas	April 12
7	ToyotaCare 250	Richmond International Raceway	Richmond, Virginia	April 26
8	Aaron's 312	Talladega Superspeedway	Lincoln, Alabama	May 4
9	VFW Sport Clips Help a Hero 200	Darlington Raceway	Darlington, South Carolina	May 10
10	History 300	Charlotte Motor Speedway	Concord, North Carolina	May 25
11	5-hour Energy 200	Dover International Speedway	Dover, Delaware	June 1
12	DuPont Pioneer 250	Iowa Speedway	Newton, Iowa	June 9†
13	Alliance Truck Parts 250	Michigan International Speedway	Cambridge Township, Michigan	June 15
14	Johnsonville Sausage 200	Road America	Elkhart Lake, Wisconsin	June 22
15	Feed the Children 300	Kentucky Speedway	Sparta, Kentucky	June 28
16	Subway Firecracker 250	Daytona International Speedway	Daytona Beach, Florida	July 5
17	CNBC Prime's "The Profit" 200	New Hampshire Motor Speedway	Loudon, New Hampshire	July 13
18	STP 300	Chicagoland Speedway	Joliet, Illinois	July 21
19	Indiana 250	Indianapolis Motor Speedway	Speedway, Indiana	July 27
20	U.S. Cellular 250	Iowa Speedway	Newton, Iowa	August 3
21	Zippo 200 at The Glen	Watkins Glen International	Watkins Glen, New York	August 10
22	Nationwide Children's Hospital 200	Mid-Ohio Sports Car Course	Lexington, Ohio	August 17
23	Food City 250	Bristol Motor Speedway	Bristol, Tennessee	August 23
24	Great Clips / Grit Chips 300	Atlanta Motor Speedway	Hampton, Georgia	August 31
25	Virginia 529 College Savings 250	Richmond International Raceway	Richmond, Virginia	September 6
26	Dollar General 300	Chicagoland Speedway	Joliet, Illinois	September 14
27	Kentucky 300	Kentucky Speedway	Sparta, Kentucky	September 21
28	5-hour Energy 200	Dover International Speedway	Dover, Delaware	September 28
29	Kansas Lottery 300	Kansas Speedway	Kansas City, Kansas	October 5
30	Dollar General 300	Charlotte Motor Speedway	Concord, North Carolina	October 11
31	O'Reilly Auto Parts Challenge	Texas Motor Speedway	Fort Worth, Texas	November 2
32	ServiceMaster 200	Phoenix International Raceway	Avondale, Arizona	November 9
33	Ford EcoBoost 300	Homestead–Miami Speedway	Homestead, Florida	November 16
†: The DuPont Pioneer 250 was postponed a day because of persistent rain.

=== Schedule changes ===
On October 5, 2012, Circuit Gilles Villeneuve's promoter François Dumontier announced that the series would not return to the circuit for the 2013 season. The event was later replaced by Mid-Ohio Sports Car Course located in Lexington, Ohio.

== Changes ==
=== Rule changes ===
After banning all testing on tracks where any of the three premier series sanction races in 2008, NASCAR announced on September 29, 2012, that they will implement limited testing at tracks which sanction a race on the schedule. However, NASCAR stated that each team would only be allowed to test two different times, with each test at a different track. Rookie of the Year participants will also be allowed one extra test session, while NASCAR will choose two other events for extra testing during the race weekend. NASCAR also announced that the Nationwide Series's grid would decrease from 43 cars to 40.

== Season summary ==
The Nationwide Series kicked off the 2013 season at Daytona International Speedway in the DRIVE4COPD 300. Following a big crash with 14 laps to go that resulted in a red flag, Regan Smith took the lead, attempting to take his second consecutive win. On the final lap, Smith attempted to block a pass attempt by Brad Keselowski and got turned into the outside wall, causing a big crash behind. Stewart drove to the inside and won his seventh career Daytona Nationwide race. However, the win was overshadowed by the last lap crash. Kyle Larson, who was collected into the crash, had his car lift off the ground and slam into the safety fence. The car's engine and front wheels landed in the grandstands, injuring 33 fans (all of whom survived).

The series moved out west to Phoenix International Raceway. The race would be dominated by Joe Gibbs Racing drivers Kyle Busch, Matt Kenseth, and Brian Vickers. While Kenseth and Vickers had separate incidents taking them out of contention, Busch rallied from an early speeding penalty and drove to his first Nationwide win since 2011. The series made its lone stop at the Las Vegas Motor Speedway the following week. With Cup contenders Keselowski and Dale Earnhardt Jr. having multiple issues throughout the day, Nationwide regular Sam Hornish Jr. pulled away from Kyle Busch in the closing laps to capture his first win of the season. Heading to the first short track of the season at Bristol, Kyle Busch once again dominated the race, leading 156 laps and holding off rookie Kyle Larson on the last lap for his second win of the season. Heading out west to the Auto Club Speedway, Kyle Busch would once again dominate the race weekend from the pole, easily winning his second consecutive race of the season and JGR's 9th consecutive win at ACS.

Following another off week, the Nationwide Series rolled into Texas Motor Speedway. Nationwide points leader Sam Hornish Jr. had the fastest car of the night, but contact with Jeremy Clements took Hornish out of contention. Kyle Busch took over the lead and easily won his third consecutive race of the season. The following week at Richmond International Raceway, the race would be dominated by Cup regulars Kevin Harvick, Kyle Busch, and polesitter Brad Keselowski. The three swapped the lead throughout the night, with Busch and Harvick's cars fading in the closing laps. Keselowski made a late pass on Harvick and went on to capture his first win of the 2013 season. The teams then headed south to Talladega Superspeedway. Joey Logano would dominate the race and looked set to win another plate race. With the race cut to 110 laps due to impending darkness, Regan Smith, with help from JR Motorsports teammate Kasey Kahne, stormed past Logano in a three wide finish on the final lap. Though Kahne beat Smith to the start finish line, Smith was ahead of his teammate at the scoring loop, handing him his first win of the season as well as the points lead. The night race at Darlington Raceway would be dominated by JGR. Pole winner Kyle Busch dominated the race, leading 107 laps and holding off teammates Elliott Sadler and Brian Vickers to take his 5th win of the season. Austin Dillon started on pole for the History 300 at Charlotte Motor Speedway, but Kyle Busch once again dominated. Busch led the most laps and took his 2nd consecutive win (his 6th of the season).

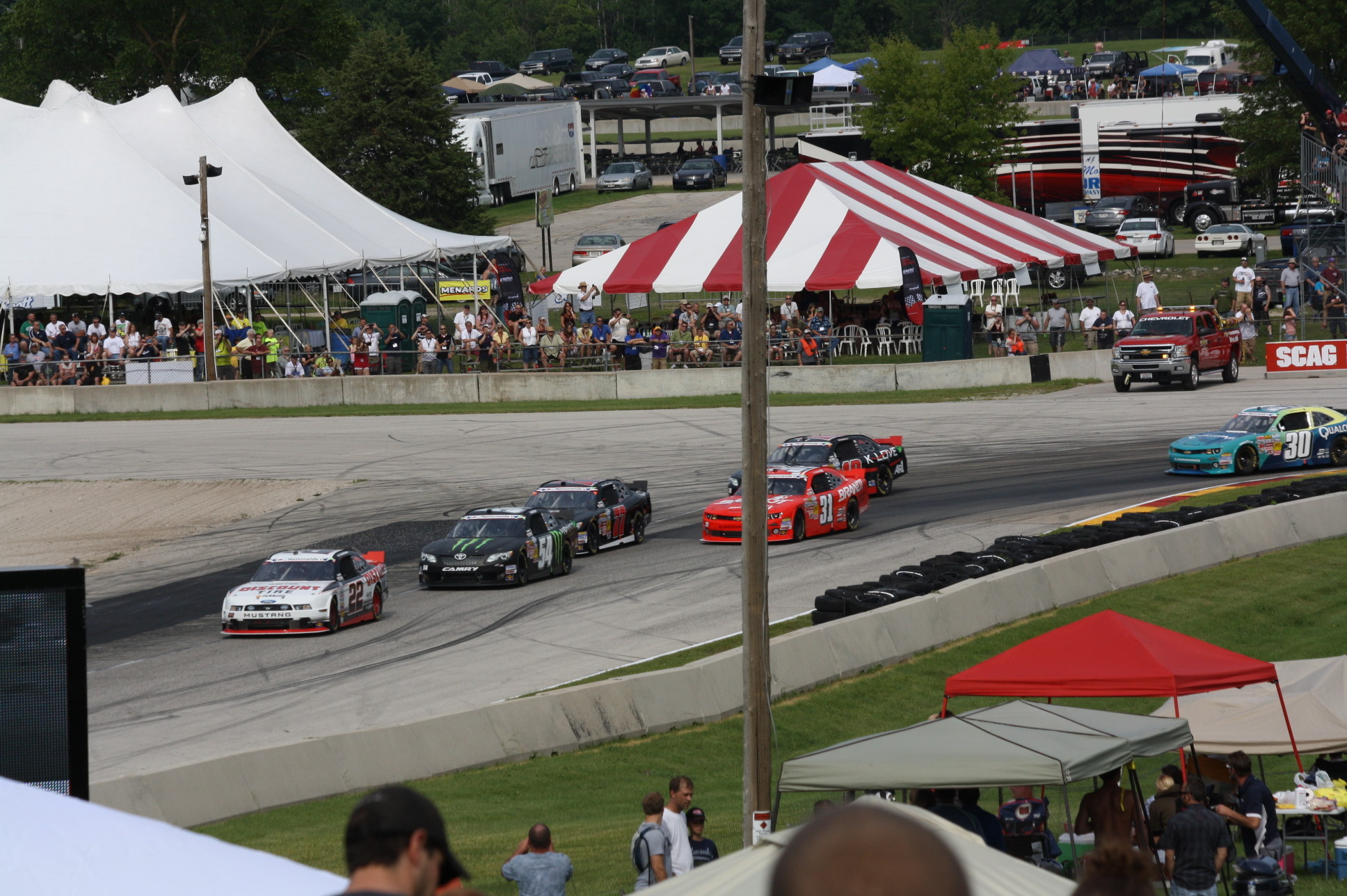
Starting field in Turn 5 at Road America

At Dover International Speedway, Kyle Busch once again dominated the race, looking for his 7th win of the season. A call for four tires late in the race proved to be his undoing and sent him outside the top-10. Joey Logano, who had won the previous year's race with Joe Gibbs Racing, inherited the lead and went on to win. The first stand-alone weekend for the Nationwide Series came at Iowa Speedway. Polesitter Austin Dillon dominated the race that had been pushed back from Saturday to Sunday and interrupted due to rain. However, Trevor Bayne would chase down Dillon and pass him before the race was declared official on lap 207, handing Bayne his first win of the season. The Nationwide Series headed north to Michigan International Speedway. Fuel mileage was key to winning the race, and points leader Regan Smith would take the lead over Parker Kligerman with 13 laps to go, and held off rookie Kyle Larson to take his second win of the season. Heading to the first road course of the season at Road America, polesitter A. J. Allmendinger would dominate most of the race, holding off Justin Allgaier on a green-white-checkered finish to earn his first win in NASCAR. The following week at Kentucky Speedway, the race would be dominated by Cup regulars Kyle Busch and Brad Keselowski. Though Busch would lead the most laps, Keselowski emerged with the dominant car of the night, being declared the race winner after the race was called due to rain on lap 170. The Nationwide Series made its return to Daytona the following week. The Penske duo of Sam Hornish and Joey Logano would be dominant throughout most of the race. However, Sprint Cup regular Matt Kenseth, with help from James Buescher, worked his way to the front and held off the field for the win.

At Loudon, Kyle Busch would once again dominate the race, but would have to survive a late red flag, as well as three green-white-checkered finishes to return to victory lane. At Chicagoland, defending winner Elliott Sadler had the dominant car, looking to turn his season around. However, Sam Hornish Jr. would rally from an early speeding penalty to take the lead from Sadler, only to be passed by teammate Joey Logano, who held on to take his second win of the season. At Indianapolis, pole-sitter Kyle Busch dominated the race, leading 92 of 100 laps and holding off Brian Scott to win his eighth race of the year. The series then returned to Iowa. Despite polesitter Austin Dillon dominating the race, Cup driver Brad Keselowski would rally twice in the race, first from a pit road penalty, then an overheating issue. Though both Dillon and Keselowski took four tires during the final round of pitstops at lap 200, Keselowski would charge through the field and take his third win of the season. At Watkins Glen, Keselowski and Penske Racing teammate Sam Hornish Jr. dominated the race, and Keselowski won his second consecutive Nationwide race.

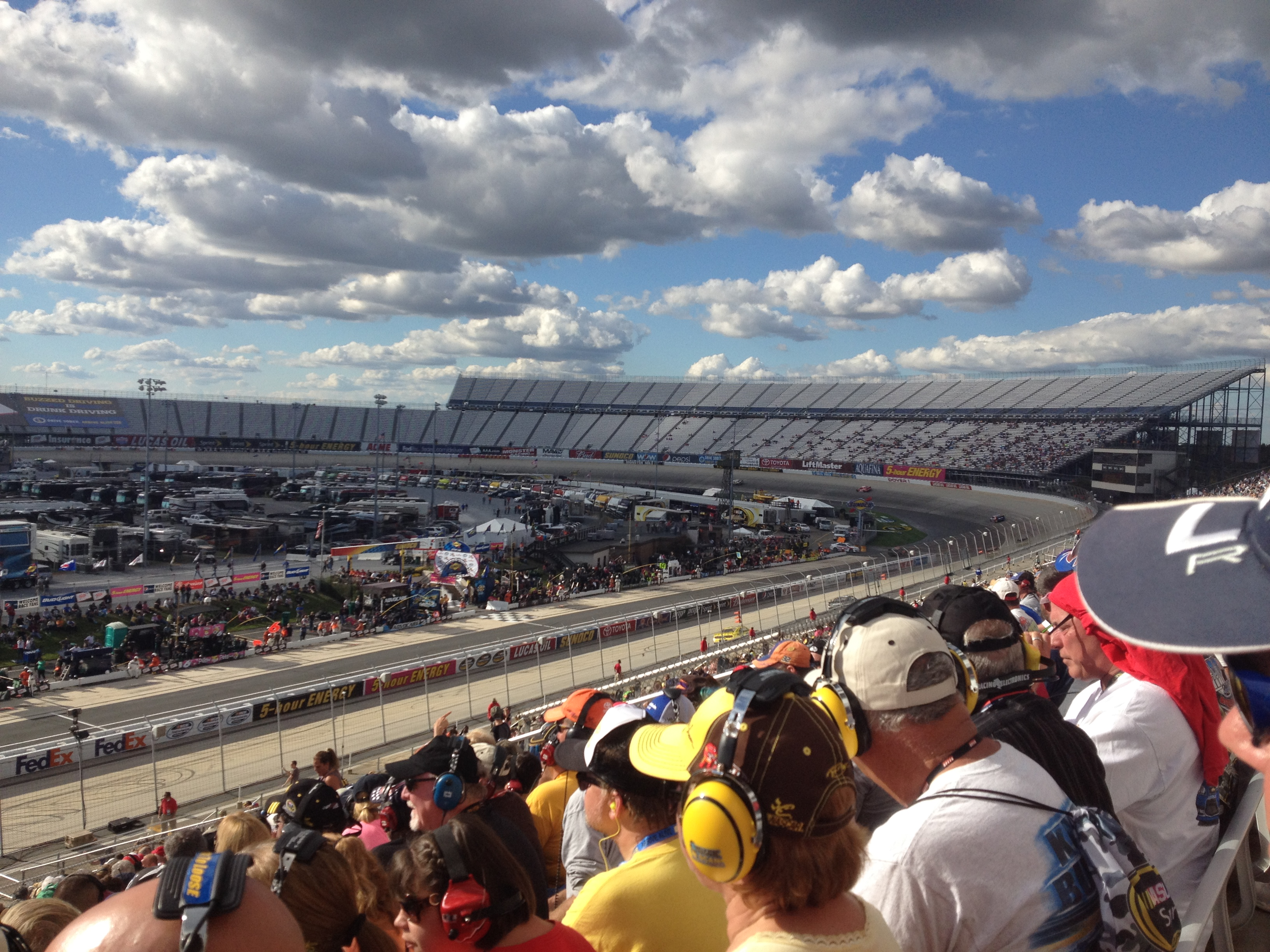
September 2013 5-hour Energy 200 at Dover International Speedway

At Bristol, Kyle Busch started from the pole, and led 228 of 250 laps to win. Kevin Harvick held off Kyle Busch to win at Atlanta the following week. The Nationwide Series made its return to Richmond for its 1,000th race. Polesitter Brian Scott dominated the field, leading 239 of 250 laps. However, on the final restart, Scott spun his tires, handing the lead over to Brad Keselowski who held him and Regan Smith off for the win, as well as the 19th consecutive time that Cup regulars had won at Richmond. The series then returned to Chicagoland Speedway, where Kyle Busch led 195 of 200 laps to take his tenth win of the season.

The Nationwide Series then held its final stand alone race of the year at Kentucky. Truck series regular Ryan Blaney would dominate the field, easily taking his first career win. Returning to Dover, multiple pit strategies were the order of the day. While Trevor Bayne decided to pit on lap 25 Joey Logano and others decided to pit on lap 40. Kyle Busch, who was taken out of contention due to pit strategy, decided to max out his cars fuel mileage to lap 86. However, he was forced to pit under the green flag, costing him the win. Logano would take back the lead from Busch on lap 142 and would win his fourth consecutive Dover Nationwide race. The series made the final Midwestern stop at Kansas Speedway, where the race would be dominated by Regan Smith, hoping to put himself back in the championship hunt. However, Matt Kenseth's team would make a late call to pit for two tires, forcing him to conserve fuel. However, contact between Kyle Busch and Brad Keselowski, whose respective cars were fighting for the owner's championship, late in the race caused a caution. On the following restart, Kenseth pulled away for his second Nationwide win of the year. The teams then headed home to Charlotte Motor Speedway. Championship contender Sam Hornish Jr. dominated the early stages of the race with a fast car. Despite an early two-tire stop by Matt Kenseth, Hornish returned to the lead until the middle stages of the race, when Regan Smith took the lead after a round of pit stops. Rookie Kyle Larson used the outside lane to pass Smith and lead until lap 163. A slow stop by Larson's crew handed the lead to polesitter Kyle Busch. Despite Hornish reeling in Busch after the restart, his car faded over the long run, allowing Busch to retake the lead with seven laps to go and sail to his eleventh win of the season. In the second Texas race, Alex Bowman won the pole for the 2nd straight Texas race but Sprint Cup driver Brad Keselowski dominated the race on his way to 7th win of the season. At Phoenix, Kyle Busch dominated from the pole and held off Justin Allgaier to sweep the Phoenix races in 2013. Austin Dillon and Sam Hornish Jr were separated by 8 points heading into the final race. At the season finale at Homestead, Sam Hornish Jr won the pole and was trailing Austin Dillon by 8 points. He and fellow Nationwide regular Kyle Larson dominated but Brad Keselowski passed Larson on fresher tires with less than 10 laps to go to score his eighth win of the season. Austin Dillon would finish twelfth and win the championship by 3 points despite not winning a race all season.

== Results and standings ==
=== Races ===
No.	Race	Pole position	Most laps led	Winning driver	Winning manufacturer	No.	Winning team
1	DRIVE4COPD 300	Trevor Bayne	Regan Smith	Tony Stewart	Chevrolet	33	Richard Childress Racing
2	Dollar General 200	Kyle Busch	Kyle Busch	Kyle Busch	Toyota	54	Joe Gibbs Racing
3	Sam's Town 300	Brian Vickers	Sam Hornish Jr.	Sam Hornish Jr.	Ford	12	Penske Racing
4	Jeff Foxworthy's Grit Chips 300	Justin Allgaier	Kyle Busch	Kyle Busch	Toyota	54	Joe Gibbs Racing
5	Royal Purple 300	Kyle Busch	Kyle Busch	Kyle Busch	Toyota	54	Joe Gibbs Racing
6	O'Reilly Auto Parts 300	Alex Bowman	Kyle Busch	Kyle Busch	Toyota	54	Joe Gibbs Racing
7	ToyotaCare 250	Brad Keselowski	Kevin Harvick	Brad Keselowski	Ford	22	Penske Racing
8	Aaron's 312	Travis Pastrana	Joey Logano	Regan Smith	Chevrolet	7	JR Motorsports
9	VFW Sport Clips Help a Hero 200	Kyle Busch	Kyle Busch	Kyle Busch	Toyota	54	Joe Gibbs Racing
10	History 300	Austin Dillon	Kyle Busch	Kyle Busch	Toyota	54	Joe Gibbs Racing
11	5-hour Energy 200	Austin Dillon	Kyle Busch	Joey Logano	Ford	22	Penske Racing
12	DuPont Pioneer 250	Austin Dillon	Austin Dillon	Trevor Bayne	Ford	6	Roush Fenway Racing
13	Alliance Truck Parts 250	Austin Dillon	Austin Dillon	Regan Smith	Chevrolet	7	JR Motorsports
14	Johnsonville Sausage 200	A. J. Allmendinger	A. J. Allmendinger	A. J. Allmendinger	Ford	22	Penske Racing
15	Feed the Children 300	Austin Dillon	Kyle Busch	Brad Keselowski	Ford	22	Penske Racing
16	Subway Firecracker 250	Austin Dillon	Sam Hornish Jr.	Matt Kenseth	Toyota	18	Joe Gibbs Racing
17	CNBC Prime's "The Profit" 200	Kyle Busch	Kyle Busch	Kyle Busch	Toyota	54	Joe Gibbs Racing
18	STP 300	Sam Hornish Jr.	Elliott Sadler	Joey Logano	Ford	22	Penske Racing
19	Indiana 250	Kyle Busch	Kyle Busch	Kyle Busch	Toyota	54	Joe Gibbs Racing
20	U.S. Cellular 250	Drew Herring	Austin Dillon	Brad Keselowski	Ford	22	Penske Racing
21	Zippo 200 at The Glen	Sam Hornish Jr.	Brad Keselowski	Brad Keselowski	Ford	22	Penske Racing
22	Nationwide Children's Hospital 200	Michael McDowell	A. J. Allmendinger	A. J. Allmendinger	Ford	22	Penske Racing
23	Food City 250	Kyle Busch	Kyle Busch	Kyle Busch	Toyota	54	Joe Gibbs Racing
24	Great Clips / Grit Chips 300	Kyle Busch	Kevin Harvick	Kevin Harvick	Chevrolet	33	Richard Childress Racing
25	Virginia 529 College Savings 250	Brian Scott	Brian Scott	Brad Keselowski	Ford	22	Penske Racing
26	Dollar General 300	Kyle Busch	Kyle Busch	Kyle Busch	Toyota	54	Joe Gibbs Racing
27	Kentucky 300	Sam Hornish Jr.	Ryan Blaney	Ryan Blaney	Ford	22	Penske Racing
28	5-hour Energy 200	Joey Logano	Joey Logano	Joey Logano	Ford	22	Penske Racing
29	Kansas Lottery 300	Austin Dillon	Regan Smith	Matt Kenseth	Toyota	18	Joe Gibbs Racing
30	Dollar General 300	Kyle Busch	Sam Hornish Jr.	Kyle Busch	Toyota	54	Joe Gibbs Racing
31	O'Reilly Auto Parts Challenge	Alex Bowman	Brad Keselowski	Brad Keselowski	Ford	22	Penske Racing
32	ServiceMaster 200	Kyle Busch	Kyle Busch	Kyle Busch	Toyota	54	Joe Gibbs Racing
33	Ford EcoBoost 300	Sam Hornish Jr.	Kyle Larson	Brad Keselowski	Ford	48	Penske Racing

=== Drivers' standings ===
(key) Bold - Pole position awarded by time. Italics - Pole position set by final practice results or rainout. * – Most laps led.

Pos	Driver	DAY	PHO	LVS	BRI	CAL	TEX	RCH	TAL	DAR	CLT	DOV	IOW	MCH	ROA	KEN	DAY	NHA	CHI	IND	IOW	GLN	MOH	BRI	ATL	RCH	CHI	KEN	DOV	KAN	CLT	TEX	PHO	HOM	Points
1	Austin Dillon	21	6	6	11	5	3	35	10	11	**14**	**8**	**2***	**20***	10	**6**	**5**	3	3	12	4*	12	21	3	8	12	4	2	6	**6**	2	5	3	12	1180
2	Sam Hornish Jr.	2	7	1*	4	2	34	7	25	8	12	7	4	32	5	9	7*	7	**2**	34	2	**2**	3	12	3	6	3	**4**	17	17	3*	3	5	**8**	1177
3	Regan Smith	14*	11	7	6	3	7	5	1	7	10	9	7	1	32	30	8	8	13	19	11	4	15	21	9	3	13	12	15	3*	19	6	4	29	1108
4	Elliott Sadler	15	5	5	36	7	13	6	11	2	13	28	3	8	9	2	3	18	4*	13	8	5	6	10	18	8	19	14	5	10	36	7	8	16	1090
5	Justin Allgaier	7	3	15	**8**	11	10	31	5	10	7	12	8	12	2	13	12	13	8	33	17	7	8	4	11	11	12	17	12	5	6	19	2	19	1090
6	Trevor Bayne	31	4	4	12	9	26	12	28	32	6	4	1	5	30	12	10	6	7	16	10	10	9	6	7	5	15	15	9	9	8	11	7	5	1086
7	Brian Scott	6	10	9	10	8	11	20	27	14	15	14	6	10	20	17	17	4	11	2	13	11	12	9	10	**2***	14	11	11	18	12	8	13	32	1053
8	Kyle Larson **(R)**	13	13	32	2	6	32	8	38	6	4	10	5	2	7	7	6	14	12	11	5	30	14	5	5	14	32	33	2	30	13	9	32	2*	995
9	Parker Kligerman	5	19	30	9	4	12	11	6	15	9	11	14	25	3	16	18	20	6	18	16	6	13	35	16	36	8	29	7	7	9	13	12	7	993
10	Brian Vickers	19	17	3	3	34	9	4	15	3	11	2	29	33	6	4	13	2	5	4	3	3	5	34	15	7	6	7	4	29	31	INJ	INJ	INJ	970
11	Alex Bowman **(R)**	3	31	8	14	12	**14**	27	13	17	20	17	22	14	24	10	20	10	31	15	7	13	11	33	34	15	11	5	18	11	18	**18**	11		884
12	Nelson Piquet Jr. **(R)**	11	15	13	34	16	18	14	29	16	16	20	25	9	21	8	21	12	17	14	14	9	27	24	12	21	10	27	24	20	25	15	18	10	861
13	Mike Bliss	23	14	17	13	18	20	13	14	19	19	18	10	21	33	19	14	17	19	36	18	27	17	17	22	18	23	26	10	13	15	23	17	37	814
14	Travis Pastrana	10	28	10	16	13	33	9	**36**	28	33	15	32	17	16	15	34	16	18	10	27	15	31	13	17	20	27	34	22	14	24	31	21	18	751
15	Michael Annett	26									17	13	30	19	35	18	15	5	16	9	12	22	22	11	14	13	18	10	14	12	10	14	14	17	696
16	Jeremy Clements	33			33	21	35	37	9	20	22	19	17	13	23	25	22	23	25	35	21	20	10	22	23	26	24	20	20	36	20	22	26	30	638
17	Mike Wallace	34	32	34	23	23	21	33	7	25	24	31	20	16	13	21	37	28	24	22	24	40	33	27	27	24	28	22	21	31	22	25	25	28	609
18	Reed Sorenson	30	18	16	18	17	15	10	22	18	37	29	15	24	37	22	39	34	30	28	31	16	36	28	21	27	33	21			37				524
19	Joe Nemechek	18	36	27	24	14	19	23	37	24	32	33	QL	29		33	19	22	23	23				18	24	29	30	23	23	25	23	33	30	26	513
20	Eric McClure	8	29	40	21	27	30	26	23	26	30	24	18	28	27	23	24	31	28	31	23	28	INJ	INJ	INJ	INJ	25	24	26	27	33	INJ	27	INJ	482
21	Cole Whitt											16	16	15	8	31	16			17	20	8		14	20			9	16			20		9	426
22	Brad Sweet			12	22	22							34	6		14	28		9		15						20	30	13	8	26	10	28	31	420
23	Johanna Long	27	40	19			27	15	26		36		12	18		20			20	27	19					19	26	16		24	17	37		21	414
24	Landon Cassill					QL	36^{2}	19^{2}	17^{2}	23^{2}	21	22		26	39	36	23	30	21	25		17		23	19	23	22		19	22	32	24		33	359
25	Blake Koch	38	16	21	25	32	24	25	33	22		40	36	22		34	DNQ	37	27		38	36	40	31	40		38	39	30	37	38	36	38	11	349
26	Kevin Swindell			DNQ		10	16	18			18		28			11	26			8				25			16				16	16	34	35	342
27	Jeffrey Earnhardt **(R)**	22	20	26	32		22	17	16			21		31	26		33	25					18			28		25			30		20		339
28	Jamie Dick	29	35	22	35	25	25	DNQ	12		34					27	25	35							32	25		28			35		22	25	277
29	Jeff Green	40	37	38	37	37	40	40	40	37		35	40	36	40	40	30	40	37	40	40	37	24	16	29	22	40	40	35	40	40	27	40	20	274
30	Dexter Stacey **(R)**	DNQ	24	23	26	26	23	38	INJ	30	27	25	21	39	25	DNQ	38	26	29				DNQ								DNQ	39^{1}	DNQ	27	257
31	Joey Gase	DNQ	30	33	Wth	40	DNQ	30				34	27	27		32	36	33	40	DNQ	26	33		DNQ	31	32	35	31	29	DNQ	DNQ	30	29		242
32	Robert Richardson Jr.	9		29	27		31	32	20		40						32			30				30	25	34					27	28			222
33	Josh Wise		38	25	19	20	37	34	18	21		38		37		38		38		39		39		40	39	38	DNQ		38	39	DNQ	38	39	39	217
34	Chris Buescher				7		17			12	38			7									QL		13					16					199
35	Hal Martin **(R)**	28	23	24	31	24	38	24	34	29	23															30				35					186
36	Drew Herring												11								**6**			36				6					16	15	175
37	Ryan Reed							16																26		9					14		15	13	171
38	Kenny Wallace							36			29		13								22			19		17	17								155
39	Kevin Lepage			36			28			35			19						33		32		20	DNQ			36	19			34				148
40	Juan Carlos Blum **(R)**	37	26	28		29	29	29			28		35	30													29								140
41	Jason White	24	22	35	30	33	DNQ		8		39	32					35																		138
42	Carl Long					30							38	35		28			35	DNQ	36	31		DNQ		DNQ	DNQ	37	31	34		34	36	DNQ	123
43	Kyle Fowler									34	26								26	20	28			29	26										119
44	Mike Harmon	17	27	QL	28	31			32								31	DNQ						DNQ	37										106
45	T. J. Bell												37						36		37	38	DNQ					38	28	33	28	32	37	38	102
46	Ken Butler III												26	34		24			38	32					28					32	39				99
47	Daryl Harr		34	31		28							24								25												33		89
48	Max Papis												31		17								4												81
49	Harrison Rhodes		25^{3}							31^{3}		26	23			29			32									32							78
50	Danny Efland	25			DNQ					27		27									34				35	DNQ		DNQ	39		DNQ				78
51	Tony Raines					DNQ				33		30			38		QL	29				29			30										76
52	Morgan Shepherd	DNQ			DNQ			DNQ	35			36	DNQ			35	40	DNQ		DNQ	35	35^{1}		DNQ	36	DNQ	DNQ		27			DNQ	DNQ		64
53	Owen Kelly														4								23												62
54	Billy Johnson														15			15																	59
55	Ryan Ellis																						38			31		35	32			35		36	57
56	Kenny Habul														18							34	26												54
57	Scott Lagasse Jr.	39		20				21																											52
58	Tanner Berryhill							28		40	DNQ								34	29^{1}							37				29				52
59	Stanton Barrett							DNQ	DNQ						19			27					35												51
60	Kyle Kelley														31							19	32												50
61	Chase Miller		39	39	39	DNQ	DNQ	DNQ		39													39	39	38	39			37	DNQ					48
62	Brad Teague				29																			32					33						38
63	Ryan Gifford																				9														35
64	Donnie Neuenberger								19																				34						35
65	Johnny O'Connell														12																				32
66	Kevin O'Connell														22								34												32
67	Matt DiBenedetto										DNQ	39^{1}							39	DNQ				37	33	37^{1}		36							31
68	Brett Butler																	36			33					DNQ	34								29
69	Anthony Gandon																					32	28												28
70	Bobby Gerhart	DNQ							31								29																		28
71	Derek White														36							25													27
72	Ryan Preece																	24																	20
73	Steve Wallace										25																								19
74	T. J. Duke																												25						19
75	Andrew Ranger														29^{1}							26	16^{1}												18
76	John Young														28																				16
77	Richard Harriman																				29														15
78	Tim Andrews								30																										14
79	Travis Sauter																				30														14
80	Derrike Cope									DNQ						39										DNQ					DNQ		35		14
81	Maryeve Dufault																										31								13
82	Kelly Admiraal																																31		13
83	Tim Schendel												33						DNQ																11
84	Corey LaJoie																																	34	10
85	Paulie Harraka					35																													9
86	Alx Danielsson																						37												7
87	David Green																			38															6
88	Jason Bowles							DNQ		DNQ			39^{1}								39		QL												5
	Derek Thorn							DNQ																											0
	Tim Cowen																						DNQ												0
	Martin Roy																							DNQ											0
Ineligible for Nationwide Series points
Pos	Driver	DAY	PHO	LVS	BRI	CAL	TEX	RCH	TAL	DAR	CLT	DOV	IOW	MCH	ROA	KEN	DAY	NHA	CHI	IND	IOW	GLN	MOH	BRI	ATL	RCH	CHI	KEN	DOV	KAN	CLT	TEX	PHO	HOM	Points
	Kyle Busch	32	**1***	2	1*	**1***	1*	3		**1***	1*	5*		4		5*	11	**1***		**1***		24		**1***	**2**	4	**1***		8	4	**1**	26	**1***	3	
	Brad Keselowski	12	2	37	15	19	2	**1**								1					1	1*		2		1				28		1*	19	1	
	Joey Logano								2*	4	3	1	QL	11			9	11	1	3		21			6		2		**1***		7			6	
	Matt Kenseth	16	8				6			5	8	3					1	9		7						35	7			1	5	4	6	4	
	A. J. Allmendinger														**1***								1*												
	Kevin Harvick		33		5		5	2*			5									5					1*		9		3		4		9		
	Ryan Blaney												9															1*					10		
	Tony Stewart	1																																	
	Kasey Kahne	20					8		3	9	2	6						19		26		18		8	4										
	Paul Menard													3				32		6										2					
	James Buescher														14		2													15	11				
	Michael McDowell	Wth	Wth		40	36	DNQ	22							34								**2**	DNQ								40		40	
	Denny Hamlin																															2			
	Matt Crafton															3			10									3							
	Dale Earnhardt Jr.	4		14			4																				5								
	Kurt Busch	35							4								4																		
	Ty Dillon			11					24	13		23					27							7		16						12		14	
	Marcos Ambrose																						7												
	Jeb Burton																											8							
	Aric Almirola		9																																
	Jamie McMurray																									10									
	Brendan Gaughan			DNQ											11							14		15											
	Jimmie Johnson		12																																
	Dakoda Armstrong					15					31								15									13		19				24	
	Joey Coulter								21										14									18							
	John Wes Townley				17				DNQ		35																								
	Ricky Stenhouse Jr.																															17			
	Ryan Sieg		21	18																24										21					
	Tomy Drissi																						19												
	Chad Hackenbracht																	21	22				30	20			21				21		24		
	Scott Riggs				20	39	DNQ							23																					
	David Starr																			21				DNQ								21			
	Bryan Silas									36	DNQ					26						23								23		29		22	
	Timmy Hill																																23	23	
	Ron Fellows																						25												
	Jennifer Jo Cobb																													26					
	Alex Kennedy																						29												
	Ricky Ehrgott																									33									
	J. J. Yeley			QL	38	38	39	39		38	DNQ	37		38		37		39		37				38		40	39		36	38	DNQ				
	Danica Patrick	36							39																										
	Ryan Truex																						QL												
Pos	Driver	DAY	PHO	LVS	BRI	CAL	TEX	RCH	TAL	DAR	CLT	DOV	IOW	MCH	ROA	KEN	DAY	NHA	CHI	IND	IOW	GLN	MOH	BRI	ATL	RCH	CHI	KEN	DOV	KAN	CLT	TEX	PHO	HOM	Points

- ^{1} – Post entry, driver and owner did not score points.
- ^{2} – Landon Cassill started receiving Nationwide points at Charlotte.
- ^{3} – Harrison Rhodes started receiving Nationwide points at Dover.

=== Manufacturer ===
Pos	Manufacturer	Wins	Points
1	Ford	15	**223**
2	Toyota	14	**220**
3	Chevrolet	4	**184**
4	Dodge	0	**54**

== See also ==
- 2013 NASCAR Sprint Cup Series
- 2013 NASCAR Camping World Truck Series
- 2013 NASCAR K&N Pro Series East
- 2013 NASCAR K&N Pro Series West
- 2013 NASCAR Whelen Modified Tour
- 2013 NASCAR Whelen Southern Modified Tour
- 2013 ARCA Racing Series
- 2013 NASCAR Canadian Tire Series
- 2013 NASCAR Toyota Series
- 2013 NASCAR Whelen Euro Series
