= NASCAR O'Reilly Auto Parts Series at Dover Motor Speedway =

NASCAR Xfinity Series race at Dover Motor Speedway

NASCAR O'Reilly Auto Parts Series
- Venue: Dover Motor Speedway
- Location: Dover, Delaware, United States

Circuit information
- Surface: Concrete
- Length: 1 mi (1.6 km)
- Turns: 4

Stock car racing events in the NASCAR O'Reilly Auto Parts Series have been held at the Dover Motor Speedway. The track held 2 races annually from 1986 to 2020. The track dropped to one race a year in 2021, as Dover Motorsports gave a race to Nashville Superspeedway, where an annual race is held.

== Current date ==
BetRivers 200
- Corporate sponsor: Rivers Casino Philadelphia
- First race: 1982
- Distance: 200 miles (321.869 km)
- Laps: 200; Stages 1/2: 45 each Final stage: 110
- Previous names: Sportsman 200 (1982–1983); Budweiser 200 (1984–1991); Goodwrench 200 (1992); Goodwrench / Delco 200 (1993–1994); GM Goodwrench / Delco 200 (1995–1996); GM Goodwrench / Delco Batteries 200 (1997); MBNA Platinum 200 (1998–2002); MBNA Armed Forces Family 200 (2003); MBNA America 200 (2004); MBNA RacePoints 200 (2005); StonebridgeRacing.com 200 (2006); Dover 200 (2007); Heluva Good! 200 (2008–2010); 5-hour Energy 200 (2011–2013); Buckle Up 200 (2014–2015); Ollie's Bargain Outlet 200 (2016); OneMain Financial 200 (2017–2018); Allied Steel Buildings 200 (2019); Drydene 200 (2020–2021); A-GAME 200 (2022–2023)
- Most wins (driver): Justin Allgaier; Greg Biffle; Todd Bodine; Kyle Busch; Dale Earnhardt Jr. Carl Edwards; Joey Logano; Darrell Waltrip; Ryan Truex (2)
- Most wins (team): Joe Gibbs Racing (8)
- Most wins (manufacturer): Chevrolet (19)

The BetRivers 200 is an annual 200-mile (321.869 km) NASCAR O'Reilly Auto Parts Series stock car race held at the Dover Motor Speedway in Dover, Delaware. Corey Day is the defending winner of the event, having won it in 2026.

=== History ===
The race was broadcast in the United States on ESPN until 2015, when the race moved to Fox. In 2016, the race was moved to the second week of May because of the Cup Series race, and was 200 laps in total with two 40 lap heats and 120 lap main as part of the Xfinity 'Dash 4 Cash' program. In 2017, the race would not use the heat races and would utilize NASCAR's new stage format with stages 1 and 2 being 60 laps each, with last stage being the final 80 laps.

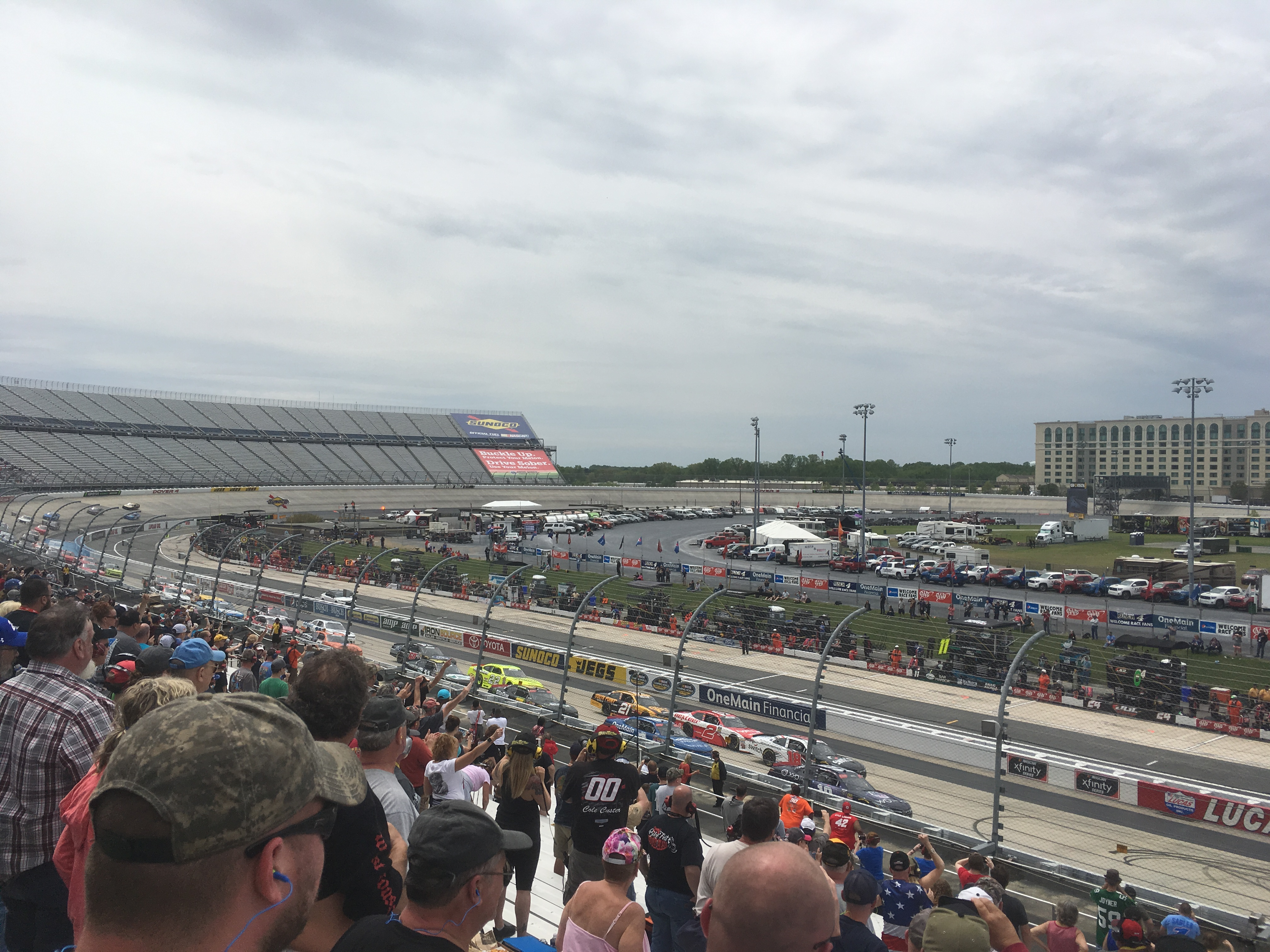
The field taking the green flag at the start of the 2018 race

The 2020 race was originally scheduled for May 2 before being postponed to August 22 due to the COVID-19 pandemic. As part of a revised track schedule, the race was held the day before the original fall event, also named the Drydene 200.

The 2022 race was held in the month of April for the first time and A-GAME, an energy drink where former MLB player Johnny Damon is the company's chairman of the board, became the title sponsor of the race, replacing Drydene. A-GAME sponsored both driver Jason White and RSS Racing in 2021 and 2022 in the Xfinity Series.

In 2024, Rivers Casino Philadelphia took over the naming rights for the event, using the "BetRivers" brand of sportsbooks based on the gambling at their casino. In 2025, the race moved to July. The race moved back to May in 2026 to accommodate the Cup Series' All-Star Race.

==== Past winners ====
Year	Date	No.	Driver	Team	Manufacturer	Race Distance		Race Time	Average Speed (mph)	Report	Ref
Year	Date	No.	Driver	Team	Manufacturer	Laps	Miles (km)	Race Time	Average Speed (mph)	Report	Ref
1982	May 15	75	Joe Ruttman	Butch Mock	Pontiac	200	200 (321.868)	1:47:27	111.679	Report	
1983	May 14	01	Ricky Rudd	Emanuel Zervakis	Oldsmobile	200	200 (321.868)	1:41:27	118.285	Report	
1984	May 19	00	Sam Ard	Thomas Brothers Racing	Oldsmobile	200	200 (321.868)	1:47:15	111.888	Report	
1985	May 18	17	Darrell Waltrip	DarWal, Inc.	Chevrolet	200	200 (321.868)	1:50:10	108.926	Report	
1986	May 17	17	Darrell Waltrip	DarWal, Inc.	Pontiac	200	200 (321.868)	1:51:12	107.914	Report	
1987	May 30	31	Mark Martin	Bruce Lawmaster	Ford	200	200 (321.868)	1:58:20	101.408	Report	
1988	June 4	81	Bobby Hillin Jr.	Ted Conder	Buick	200	200 (321.868)	1:46:55	112.236	Report	
1989	June 3	75	Rick Wilson	Charlie Henderson	Oldsmobile	200	200 (321.868)	1:45:09	114.122	Report	
1990	June 2	30	Michael Waltrip	Bahari Racing	Pontiac	200	200 (321.868)	1:51:01	108.091	Report	
1991	June 1	34	Todd Bodine	Team 34	Buick	200	200 (321.868)	1:41:25	118.323	Report	
1992	June 1	59	Robert Pressley	Alliance Motorsports	Oldsmobile	200	200 (321.868)	2:14:08	89.408	Report	
1993	June 5	34	Todd Bodine	Team 34	Chevrolet	200	200 (321.868)	1:42:45	116.694	Report	
1994	June 4	9	Mike Wallace	Owen Racing	Chevrolet	200	200 (321.868)	2:04:59	96.013	Report	
1995	June 3	34	Mike McLaughlin	Team 34	Chevrolet	200	200 (321.868)	1:56:38	102.887	Report	
1996	June 1	74	Randy LaJoie	BACE Motorsports	Chevrolet	200	200 (321.868)	2:04:36	96.308	Report	
1997	May 31	44	Bobby Labonte	Labonte Motorsports	Pontiac	200	200 (321.868)	1:44:56	114.358	Report	
1998	May 30	3	Dale Earnhardt Jr.	Dale Earnhardt, Inc.	Chevrolet	200	200 (321.868)	1:32:12	130.152	Report	
1999	June 5	3	Dale Earnhardt Jr.	Dale Earnhardt, Inc.	Chevrolet	200	200 (321.868)	2:11:24	91.324	Report	
2000	June 3	57	Jason Keller	ppc Racing	Chevrolet	200	200 (321.868)	2:00:21	99.709	Report	
2001	June 2	1	Jimmy Spencer	Phoenix Racing	Chevrolet	200	200 (321.868)	2:11:18	91.394	Report	
2002	June 1	60	Greg Biffle	Roush Racing	Ford	200	200 (321.868)	1:48:22	110.735	Report	
2003	May 31	87	Joe Nemechek	NEMCO Motorsports	Chevrolet	200	200 (321.868)	1:54:40	104.651	Report	
2004	June 5	60	Greg Biffle	Roush Racing	Ford	200	200 (321.868)	2:16:28	87.934	Report	
2005	June 4	8	Martin Truex Jr.	Chance 2 Motorsports	Chevrolet	200	200 (321.868)	2:03:23	97.258	Report	
2006	June 3	29	Jeff Burton	Richard Childress Racing	Chevrolet	200	200 (321.868)	1:55:37	103.791	Report	
2007	June 2	60	Carl Edwards	Roush Fenway Racing	Ford	200	200 (321.868)	2:09:04	92.975	Report	
2008	May 31	18	Denny Hamlin	Joe Gibbs Racing	Toyota	200	200 (321.868)	1:46:46	112.395	Report	
2009	May 30	88	Brad Keselowski	JR Motorsports	Chevrolet	200	200 (321.868)	2:08:48	93.168	Report	
2010	May 15	18	Kyle Busch	Joe Gibbs Racing	Toyota	205*	205 (329.915)	1:48:53	112.965	Report	
2011	May 14	60	Carl Edwards	Roush Fenway Racing	Ford	209*	209 (336.352)	2:11:45	95.18	Report	
2012	June 2	18	Joey Logano	Joe Gibbs Racing	Toyota	200	200 (321.868)	1:48:36	110.497	Report	
2013	June 1	22	Joey Logano	Penske Racing	Ford	200	200 (321.868)	1:47:58	111.145	Report	
2014	May 31	54	Kyle Busch	Joe Gibbs Racing	Toyota	200	200 (321.868)	1:44:35	114.741	Report	
2015	May 30	60	Chris Buescher	Roush Fenway Racing	Ford	200	200 (321.868)	1:43:39	115.774	Report	
2016*	May 14	20	Erik Jones	Joe Gibbs Racing	Toyota	120	120 (193.121)	0:58:36	122.867	Report	
2017	June 3	42	Kyle Larson	Chip Ganassi Racing	Chevrolet	200	200 (321.868)	2:04:05	96.709	Report	
2018	May 5	7	Justin Allgaier	JR Motorsports	Chevrolet	200	200 (321.868)	2:02:23	98.053	Report	
2019	May 4	20	Christopher Bell	Joe Gibbs Racing	Toyota	200	200 (321.868)	1:48:56	110.159	Report	
2020	August 22*	7	Justin Allgaier	JR Motorsports	Chevrolet	200	200 (321.868)	1:48:57	110.142	Report	
2021	May 15	22	Austin Cindric	Team Penske	Ford	200	200 (321.868)	2:10:47	91.755	Report	
2022	April 30	8	Josh Berry	JR Motorsports	Chevrolet	200	200 (321.868)	1:55:17	104.091	Report	
2023	April 29	19	Ryan Truex	Joe Gibbs Racing	Toyota	200	200 (321.868)	1:51:57	107.191	Report	
2024	April 27	20	Ryan Truex	Joe Gibbs Racing	Toyota	208*	208 (334.743)	2:45:01	87.395	Report	
2025	July 19	88	Connor Zilisch	JR Motorsports	Chevrolet	134*	134 (216.252)	1:15:51	105.999	Report	
2026	May 16	17	Corey Day	Hendrick Motorsports	Chevrolet	200	200 (321.868)	2:14:06	99.917	Report	
2027	May 15									Report	

- 2010, 2011, and 2024: Races extended due to NASCAR overtime.
- 2016: Race split into 120 lap feature, preceded by two 40 lap heat races for the Xfinity 'Dash 4 Cash' program.
- 2020: Race postponed from May 2 to August 22 due to the COVID-19 pandemic.
- 2025: Race shortened due to rain

==== Multiple winners (drivers) ====
# Wins	Driver	Years won
2	Darrell Waltrip	1985-1986
2	Todd Bodine	1991, 1993
2	Dale Earnhardt Jr.	1998-1999
2	Greg Biffle	2002, 2004
2	Carl Edwards	2007, 2011
2	Joey Logano	2012-2013
2	Kyle Busch	2010, 2014
2	Justin Allgaier	2018, 2020
2	Ryan Truex	2023-2024

==== Multiple winners (teams) ====
# Wins	Team	Years won
8	Joe Gibbs Racing	2008, 2010, 2012, 2014, 2016, 2019, 2023-2024
5	Roush Fenway Racing	2002, 2004, 2007, 2011, 2015
5	JR Motorsports	2009, 2018, 2020, 2022, 2025
2	DarWal, Inc.	1985-1986
2	Team 34	1991, 1993
2	Dale Earnhardt, Inc.	1998-1999
2	Team Penske	2013, 2021

==== Manufacturer wins ====
# Wins	Make	Years won
19	(United States) Chevrolet	1985, 1993-1996, 1998-2001, 2003, 2005-2006, 2009, 2017-2018, 2020, 2022, 2025-2026
8	(United States) Ford	1987, 2002, 2004, 2007, 2011, 2013, 2015, 2021
8	(Japan) Toyota	2008, 2010, 2012, 2014, 2016, 2019, 2023-2024
4	(United States) Pontiac	1982, 1986, 1990, 1997
4	(United States) Oldsmobile	1983-1984, 1989, 1992
2	(United States) Buick	1988, 1991

===== Qualifying race winners =====
Year	Date	Race	No.	Driver	Team	Manufacturer	Race Distance		Race Time	Average Speed (mph)
Year	Date	Race	No.	Driver	Team	Manufacturer	Laps	Miles (km)	Race Time	Average Speed (mph)
2016	May 14	1	7	Justin Allgaier	JR Motorsports	Chevrolet	40	40 (64.374)	0:16:11	148.301
2016	May 14	2	3	Ty Dillon	Richard Childress Racing	Chevrolet	40	40 (64.374)	0:23:43	101.195

== Former second date ==
Drydene 200
- Corporate sponsor: Drydene
- First race: 1986
- Last race: 2020
- Distance: 200 miles (320 km)
- Laps: 200 (Stages 1/2:60 each Final stage: 80)
- Previous names: Grand National 200 (1986–1988); Ames / Peak 200 (1989); Ames / SplitFire 200 (1990); SplitFire 200 (1991–1994); MBNA 200 (1995–1997); MBNA Gold 200 (1998–1999); MBNA.com 200 (2000–2001); MBNA All-American Heroes 200 (2002); Stacker 200 Presented by YJ Stinger (2003); Stacker 2 Hundred Presented by YJ Stinger (2004); Dover 200 (2005–2006, 2009–2010, 2014); RoadLoans.com 200 (2007); Camping World RV Sales 200 (2008); OneMain Financial 200 (2011–2012); 5-hour Energy 200 benefiting Living Beyond Breast Cancer (2013); Hisense 200 (2015); Drive Sober 200 (2016–2017); Bar Harbor 200 (2018); Use Your Melon Drive Sober 200 (2019)
- Most wins (driver): Kyle Busch (3)
- Most wins (team): Joe Gibbs Racing (7)
- Most wins (manufacturer): Chevrolet (16)

The Drydene 200 was a NASCAR Xfinity Series race that took place at Dover International Speedway. It was the second Xfinity Series race each year at Dover. The race usually took place in late September or early October before being moved to August in 2020. It is held before the Drydene 400, the NASCAR Cup Series race. It was the third race for the NASCAR Xfinity Series playoffs prior to 2020.

Chase Briscoe is the final winner of the event, having won it in 2020.

The 2020 race was held as a doubleheader in August due to the COVID-19 pandemic. Run on August 23, it took place the day after the rescheduled spring race also named the Drydene 200. Dover downscaled to one race in 2021.

=== Past winners ===
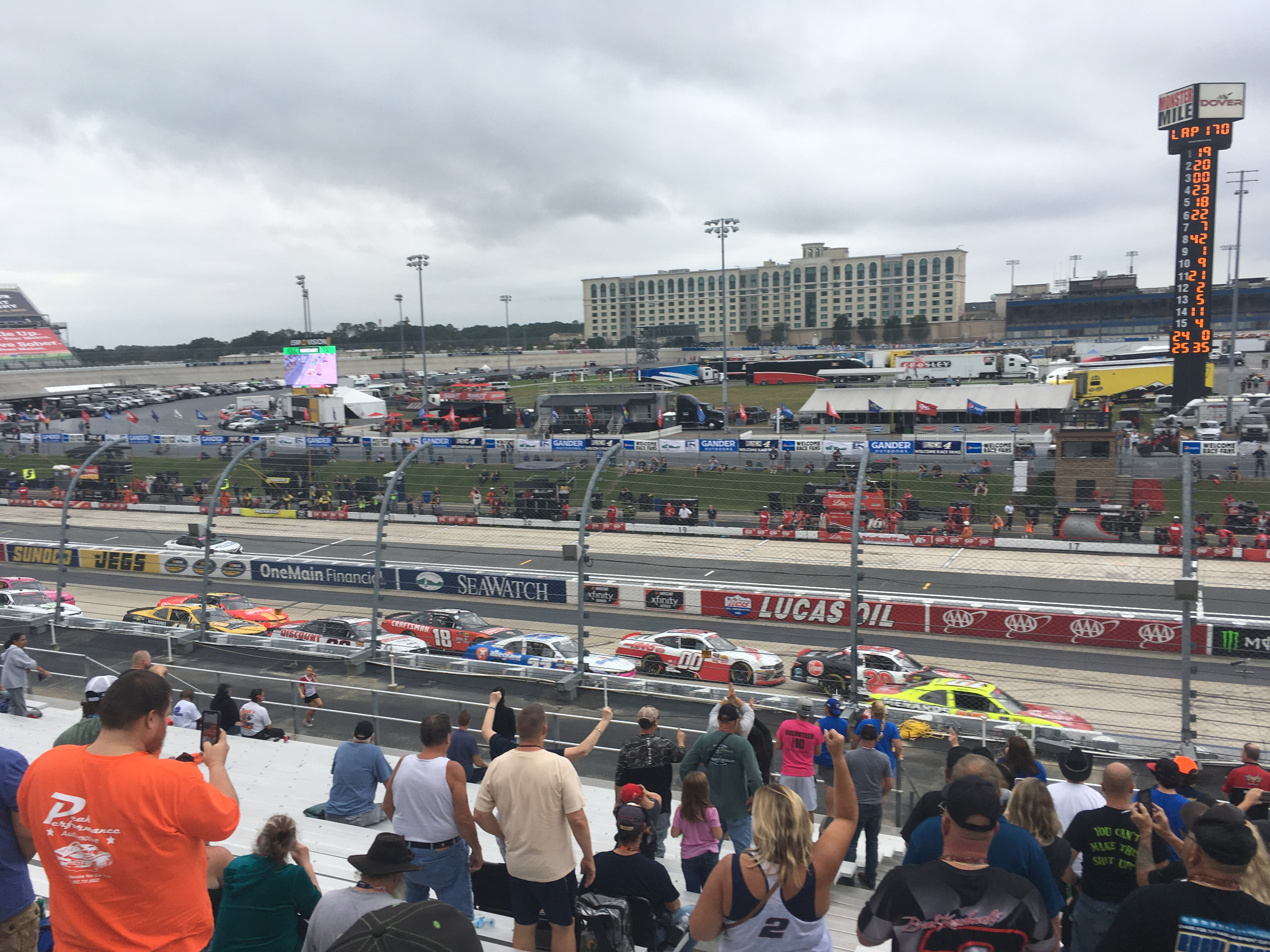
2018 Bar Harbor 200

Year	Date	No.	Driver	Team	Manufacturer	Race Distance		Race Time	Average Speed (mph)	Report	Ref
Year	Date	No.	Driver	Team	Manufacturer	Laps	Miles (km)	Race Time	Average Speed (mph)	Report	Ref
1986	September 13	77	Morgan Shepherd	Whitaker Racing	Buick	200	200 (321.868)	1:45:27	113.798	Report	
1987	September 19	22	Rick Mast	A.G. Dillard Motorsports	Buick	200	200 (321.868)	1:45:40	113.529	Report	
1988	September 17	17	Michael Waltrip	DarWal, Inc.	Chevrolet	200	200 (321.868)	1:43:23	116.073	Report	
1989	September 16	52	Ken Schrader	Ken Schrader	Chevrolet	200	200 (321.868)	1:47:49	111.3	Report	
1990	September 15	7	Harry Gant	Whitaker Racing	Buick	200	200 (321.868)	1:37:29	123.097	Report	
1991	September 14	7	Harry Gant	Whitaker Racing	Buick	200	200 (321.868)	1:34:50	126.538	Report	
1992	September 19	59	Robert Pressley	Alliance Motorsports	Oldsmobile	200	200 (321.868)	1:50:50	108.271	Report	
1993	September 18	34	Todd Bodine	Team 34	Chevrolet	200	200 (321.868)	1:54:47	104.545	Report	
1994	September 17	74	Johnny Benson Jr.	BACE Motorsports	Chevrolet	200	200 (321.868)	1:57:06	102.477	Report	
1995	September 16	25	Johnny Rumley	Beverly Racing	Chevrolet	200	200 (321.868)	1:50:07	108.975	Report	
1996	September 14	74	Randy LaJoie	BACE Motorsports	Chevrolet	200	200 (321.868)	1:41:24	118.343	Report	
1997	September 20	6	Joe Bessey	Joe Bessey Motorsports	Chevrolet	200	200 (321.868)	2:06:26	94.912	Report	
1998	September 19	17	Matt Kenseth	Reiser Enterprises	Chevrolet	200	200 (321.868)	1:53:11	106.023	Report	
1999	September 25	27	Casey Atwood	Brewco Motorsports	Chevrolet	200	200 (321.868)	2:11:19	91.382	Report	
2000	September 23	17	Matt Kenseth	Reiser Enterprises	Chevrolet	200	200 (321.868)	1:50:03	109.041	Report	
2001	September 22	10	Jeff Green	ppc Racing	Ford	200	200 (321.868)	1:51:32	107.591	Report	
2002	September 21	23	Scott Wimmer	Bill Davis Racing	Pontiac	200	200 (321.868)	1:41:28	118.265	Report	
2003	September 20	5	Brian Vickers	Hendrick Motorsports	Chevrolet	200	200 (321.868)	1:46:03	133.154	Report	
2004	September 25	8	Martin Truex Jr.	Chance 2 Motorsports	Chevrolet	200	200 (321.868)	1:38:21	122.013	Report	
2005	September 24	39	Ryan Newman	Penske Racing	Dodge	200	200 (321.868)	1:43:46	115.644	Report	
2006	September 23	2	Clint Bowyer	Richard Childress Racing	Chevrolet	202*	202 (325.087)	2:05:04	96.908	Report	
2007	September 22	20	Denny Hamlin	Joe Gibbs Racing	Chevrolet	200	200 (321.868)	2:20:51	85.197	Report	
2008	September 20	18	Kyle Busch	Joe Gibbs Racing	Toyota	207*	207 (333.134)	1:55:59	107.084	Report	
2009	September 26	29	Clint Bowyer	Richard Childress Racing	Chevrolet	200	200 (321.868)	1:38:20	122.034	Report	
2010	September 25	18	Kyle Busch	Joe Gibbs Racing	Toyota	200	200 (321.868)	1:42:14	117.379	Report	
2011	October 1	60	Carl Edwards	Roush Fenway Racing	Ford	200	200 (321.868)	1:42:17	117.321	Report	
2012	September 29	18	Joey Logano	Joe Gibbs Racing	Toyota	200	200 (321.868)	1:37:00	123.711	Report	
2013	September 28	22	Joey Logano	Penske Racing	Ford	200	200 (321.868)	1:31:27	131.219	Report	
2014	September 27	54	Kyle Busch	Joe Gibbs Racing	Toyota	200	200 (321.868)	1:43:19	116.148	Report	
2015	October 3	7	Regan Smith	JR Motorsports	Chevrolet	200	200 (321.868)	1:54:07	105.156	Report	
2016	October 2*	19	Daniel Suárez	Joe Gibbs Racing	Toyota	200	200 (321.868)	1:55:18	104.076	Report	
2017	September 30	22	Ryan Blaney	Team Penske	Ford	200	200 (321.868)	1:47:10	111.975	Report	
2018	October 6	20	Christopher Bell	Joe Gibbs Racing	Toyota	200	200 (321.868)	1:42:42	116.845	Report	
2019	October 5	00	Cole Custer	Stewart–Haas Racing with Biagi–DenBeste Racing	Ford	200	200 (321.868)	1:51:29	107.639	Report	
2020	August 23*	98	Chase Briscoe	Stewart–Haas Racing	Ford	200	200 (321.868)	1:47:21	111.784	Report	

- 2006 & 2008: Race extended due to a Green–white–checkered finish.
- 2016: Race postponed from Saturday to Sunday due to rain.
- 2020: Race moved from Saturday to Sunday due to schedule changes resulting from the COVID-19 pandemic.

==== Multiple winners (drivers) ====
# Wins	Driver	Years won
3	Kyle Busch	2008, 2010, 2014
2	Harry Gant	1990, 1991
2	Matt Kenseth	1998, 2000
2	Clint Bowyer	2006, 2009
2	Joey Logano	2012, 2013

==== Multiple winners (teams) ====
# Wins	Team	Years won
7	Joe Gibbs Racing	2007, 2008, 2010, 2012, 2014, 2016, 2018
3	Whitaker Racing	1986, 1990, 1991
3	Team Penske	2005, 2013, 2017
2	BACE Motorsports	1994, 1996
2	Reiser Enterprises	1998, 2000
2	Richard Childress Racing	2006, 2009
2	Stewart–Haas Racing	2019, 2020

==== Manufacturer wins ====
# Wins	Make	Years won
16	(United States) Chevrolet	1988, 1989, 1993, 1994, 1995, 1996, 1997, 1998, 1999, 2000, 2003, 2004, 2006, 2007, 2009, 2015
6	(Japan) Toyota	2008, 2010, 2012, 2014, 2016, 2018
6	(United States) Ford	2001, 2011, 2013, 2017, 2019, 2020
4	(United States) Buick	1986, 1987, 1990, 1991
1	(United States) Oldsmobile	1992
1	(United States) Pontiac	2002
1	(United States) Dodge	2005

Previous race: Andy's Frozen Custard 300	NASCAR O'Reilly Auto Parts Series; BetRivers 200	Next race: TBA
