= Stacy Compton =

American racing driver (born 1967)

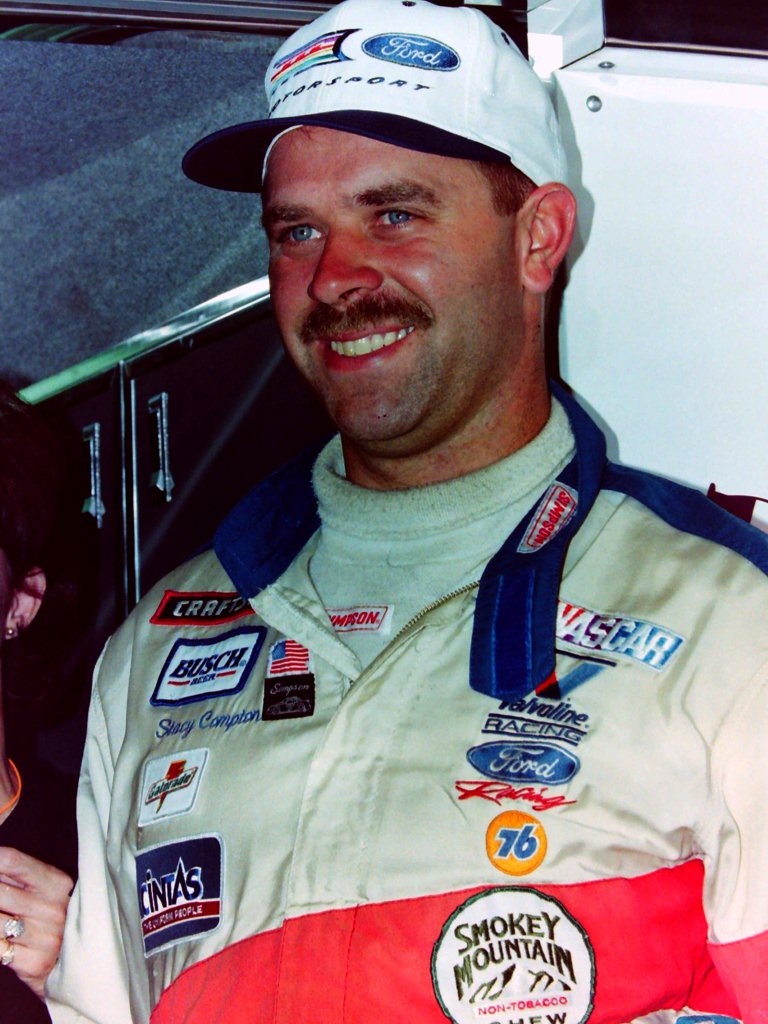
- Compton in 1997
- Born: Stacy Marshall Compton; May 26, 1967 (age 59); Hurt, Virginia, U.S.
- Awards: 1998 NASCAR Craftsman Truck Series Most Popular Driver

NASCAR Cup Series career
- 89 races run over 7 years
- 2012 position: 56th
- Best finish: 33rd (2001)
- First race: 1996 Goody's Headache Powder 500 (Martinsville)
- Last race: 2012 Pocono 400 (Pocono)
Wins	Top tens	Poles
0	1	2

NASCAR O'Reilly Auto Parts Series career
- 173 races run over 6 years
- Best finish: 9th (2002)
- First race: 2001 GNC Live Well 300 (Homestead)
- Last race: 2006 Ford 300 (Homestead)
Wins	Top tens	Poles
0	33	1

NASCAR FedEx Freight Truck Series career
- 158 races run over 10 years
- Best finish: 4th (1999)
- First race: 1997 Chevy Trucks Challenge (Disney)
- Last race: 2010 Lucas Oil 150 (Phoenix)
- First win: 1998 Craftsman 200 by NAPA (Portland)
- Last win: 1998 Lund Look 275K (Topeka)
Wins	Top tens	Poles
2	65	9

ARCA Menards Series career
- 1 race run over 1 year
- Best finish: 131st (1996)
- First race: 1996 Meijer / All Sport 200 (Michigan)
Wins	Top tens	Poles
0	0	0
- Statistics up to date as of June 9, 2012.

Stacy Marshall Compton (born May 26, 1967) is an American former professional stock car racing driver and team owner. He is a former co-owner of Bobby Hamilton Racing-Virginia in the Craftsman Truck Series and is a former racing analyst for ESPN full-time. Before he ran in NASCAR, Compton was a successful short track racer in Virginia.

== Early career ==
Compton was born in Hurt, Virginia, and grew up racing in Virginia with his focus on late models in local racing divisions. Eventually, he moved up to the NASCAR Winston Racing Series, and won 36 races in seven years of late model competition. During this time, Compton also hosted a TV show dedicated to covering Virginia races. In 1996, Compton made his debut in a major NASCAR series driving for Dean Monroe, Monroe bought Alan Dillard team beginning 1996, when he qualified in ninth place for the Goody's Headache Powder 500 at Martinsville Speedway in the Winston Cup series. He finished 33rd that day after suffering brake failure. He ran one other race during his rookie season, the fall Martinsville event. He finished 33rd in that race as well.

== Motorsports career ==
=== 1997–1999 ===
In 1997, Compton signed up with a new team, Impact Motorsports, to run the No. 86 Ford F-150 for the NASCAR Craftsman Truck Series Rookie of the Year Award. During his initial Truck Series season, Compton had three Top 5 finishes and a 13th-place finish in the final points standings, but fell well short of the top rookie award. For the 1998 season, in the third race of the season held at Phoenix International Raceway, Compton won his first career pole position, and finished 3rd in the race. The next week at Portland Speedway, he led all but two laps and won his first career Truck Series race. He got another win later that season at Heartland Park Topeka. He finished 7th in points and was named the Most Popular Driver. Compton had high hopes for 1999 season as Impact switched to Dodge Rams and getting a teammate in Randy Tolsma, but he failed to go to victory lane that season, although he did finish 4th in points. Late that season, Compton began competing in some Winston Cup races for Melling Racing. Soon afterwards, Melling announced that Compton would bypass the Busch Series, to drive their No. 9 Ford Taurus in the Winston Cup Series in 2000 season.

=== 2000–2002 ===
Compton struggled during his first year in the Cup Series, as his best finish was 16th at New Hampshire International Speedway. In the summer Michigan race, he crashed during qualifying and suffered minor injuries. He was replaced by Bobby Hillin Jr. at the following event. Compton ended the year 38th in points.

In 2001, Melling switched the car's number and manufacture to 92 and Dodge and had a new crew chief with Chad Knaus. Compton started the season by qualifying on the outside pole next to Bill Elliott in the Daytona 500 and went on to score a 10th-place finish. At the next restrictor-plate race at Talladega Superspeedway, he won his first career Cup pole position, but finished last due to mechanical issues. After winning a second career pole at Talladega, he was only able to improve his points position by five spots. At the end of the year, sponsorship problems at Melling forced him to look elsewhere for a job.

In the 2002 season, Compton signed with A.J. Foyt Racing to drive the No. 14 Pontiac, replacing Ron Hornaday Jr. He had a best finish of 18th when his sponsor Conseco filed for Chapter 11 bankruptcy. He was fired after the New England 300. He returned to Melling for one race before competing in two for BAM Racing at the end of the season. His last career Cup start for nine years came in the 2003 Pepsi 400 for Morgan-McClure Motorsports.

=== 2001–2012 ===
In 2001 at the GNC Live Well 300, Compton made his Busch Series debut with JTG Daugherty Racing, then known as ST Motorsports. He qualified 12th and finished 10th. For four consecutive seasons, Compton ran every Busch Series race with JTG. Although he did not win a Busch Series race, he has 33 career Top 10 finishes and one pole position. His best points finish was 9th in 2002.

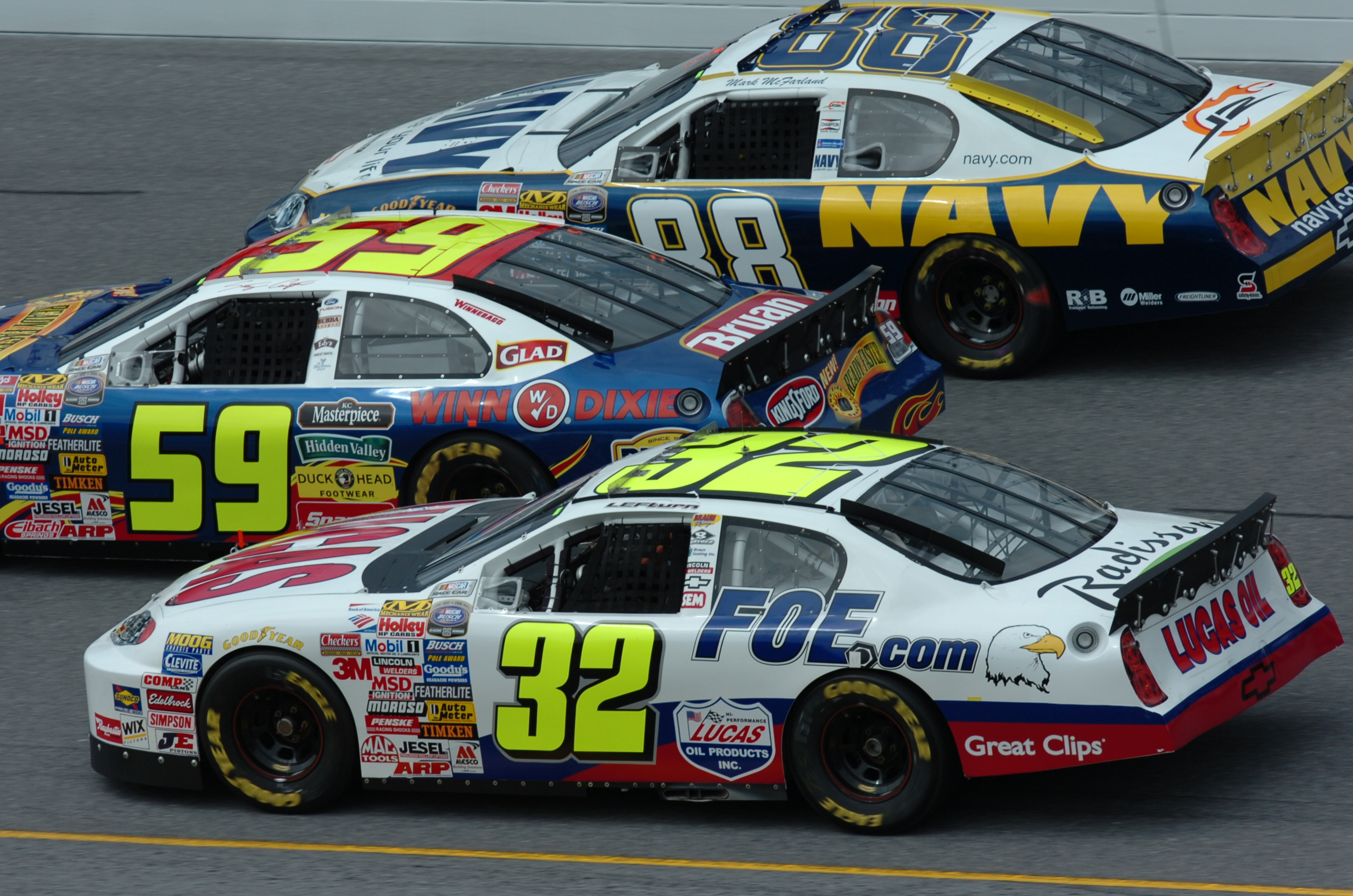
Compton in the No. 59 racing at Daytona in 2006

Following the conclusion of the 2006 season, Compton was replaced by Marcos Ambrose and returned to the Truck Series, sharing the No. 09 Ford with Joey Clanton for nine races. In 2006, Compton founded Turn One Racing, LLC, as a way of promoting talented young drivers in the southeastern United States. He made a total of fourteen starts that season, ten for Wood Brothers/JTG, as well as one for Key Motorsports and three for Xpress Motorsports. He bought into Bobby Hamilton Racing in 2008, and was named driver of the No. 4 Dodge for the team during the season. After the race at Bristol Motor Speedway, the No. 4 team shut down, leaving Compton out of a job. He drove the No. 60 Toyota for Wyler Racing in 2009, finishing with eight Top 10's and finishing 11th in points. Despite the new sponsorship, Jeff Wyler was unsure if the team would continue into 2010, so Compton and Turn One Racing bought the No. 60 from Wyler, although the team continued into 2010 under the Wyler Racing banner. Compton would split the No. 60 Truck with former Formula 1 driver Narain Karthikeyan and Red Bull development driver Cole Whitt, while also changing manufacturers to Chevrolet. Compton later took sole ownership of the team and renamed it Turn One Racing. Compton scored only five Top 10's and finished 20th in points. Karthikeyan left at the end of the year to drive for Hispania Racing in F1, while Safe Auto left the team to sponsor ThorSport Racing's No. 13 Truck.

2012 saw Compton expand his Truck Series team, Turn One Racing, into the Cup series with the No. 74 Chevrolet, starting at Bristol Motor Speedway in March He himself would attempt to qualify the car at Texas Motor Speedway but failed to do so. However, Compton did later manage to get into the field for the Pocono 400 in June. He has not raced since then.

== Motorsports career results ==
=== NASCAR ===
(key) (Bold – Pole position awarded by qualifying time. Italics – Pole position earned by points standings or practice time. * – Most laps led.)

==== Sprint Cup Series ====
NASCAR Sprint Cup Series results
Year	Team	No.	Make	1	2	3	4	5	6	7	8	9	10	11	12	13	14	15	16	17	18	19	20	21	22	23	24	25	26	27	28	29	30	31	32	33	34	35	36	NSCC	Pts	Ref
1996	Monroe Racing	46	Chevy	DAY	CAR	RCH	ATL	DAR	BRI	NWS	MAR; 33	TAL	SON	CLT	DOV	POC	MCH	DAY	NHA	POC	TAL	IND; DNQ	GLN	MCH	BRI	DAR	RCH; DNQ	DOV	MAR; 33	NWS	CLT	CAR	PHO	ATL						56th	128	
1999	Melling Racing	9	Ford	DAY	CAR	LVS	ATL	DAR	TEX	BRI	MAR	TAL	CAL	RCH	CLT	DOV	MCH	POC	SON	DAY	NHA	POC	IND	GLN	MCH	BRI	DAR	RCH	NHA	DOV	MAR	CLT	TAL	CAR; 36	PHO; 39	HOM; 30	ATL; DNQ			55th	174	
2000	Melling Racing	9	Ford	DAY; 26	CAR; 34	LVS; 32	ATL; 35	DAR; 29	BRI; 28	TEX; 36	MAR; 39	TAL; 33	CAL; 28	RCH; 22	CLT; 33	DOV; 30	MCH; 42	POC; 37	SON; 31	DAY; 39	NHA; 29	POC; 35	IND; 37	GLN; 29	MCH; DNQ	BRI	DAR; DNQ	RCH; 24	NHA; 16	DOV; 29	MAR; 39	CLT; DNQ	TAL; 23	CAR; DNQ	PHO; DNQ	HOM; 38	ATL; DNQ			38th	1857	
2001	Melling Racing	92	Dodge	DAY; 10	CAR; 41	LVS; 27	ATL; 24	DAR; 43	BRI; 11	TEX; 15	MAR; 15	**TAL**; 43	CAL; 38	RCH; 29	CLT; 34	DOV; 32	MCH; DNQ	POC; 23	SON; 24	DAY; 32	CHI; 26	NHA; 31	POC; 32	IND; 33	GLN; 20	MCH; 21	BRI; DNQ	DAR; 42	RCH; 22	DOV; 24	KAN; 34	CLT; 32	MAR; 16	**TAL**; 11	PHO; 21	CAR; 36	HOM; 43	ATL; 18	NHA; 34	33rd	2752	
2002	A.J. Foyt Racing	14	Pontiac	DAY; 27	CAR; 43	LVS; 39	ATL; 31	DAR; 27	BRI; 38	TEX; 19	MAR; 18	TAL; 27	CAL; 41	RCH; 26	CLT; 37	DOV; 24	POC; 28	MCH; 35	SON; DNQ	DAY; 18	CHI; 35	NHA; 30	POC	IND	GLN															42nd	1557	
2002	Melling Racing	92	Dodge																							MCH; 30	BRI	DAR	RCH	NHA	DOV	KAN								42nd	1557	
2002	BAM Racing	49	Dodge																														TAL; 22	CLT; 42	MAR	ATL	CAR	PHO	HOM	42nd	1557	
2003	Morgan-McClure Motorsports	4	Pontiac	DAY	CAR	LVS	ATL	DAR	BRI	TEX	TAL	MAR	CAL	RCH	CLT	DOV	POC	MCH	SON	DAY; 33	CHI	NHA	POC	IND	GLN	MCH; DNQ	BRI	DAR	RCH	NHA	DOV	TAL	KAN	CLT	MAR	ATL	PHO	CAR	HOM	71st	39	
2012	Turn One Racing	74	Chevy	DAY	PHO	LVS	BRI	CAL	MAR	TEX; DNQ	KAN	RCH	TAL	DAR	CLT	DOV	POC; 39	MCH; DNQ	SON	KEN	DAY	NHA	IND	POC	GLN	MCH	BRI	ATL	RCH	CHI	NHA	DOV	TAL	CLT	KAN	MAR	TEX	PHO	HOM	56th	5	

===== Daytona 500 =====
Year	Team	Manufacturer	Start	Finish
2000	Melling Racing	Ford	33	26
2001	Melling Racing	Dodge	2	10
2002	A.J. Foyt Racing	Pontiac	24	27

==== Busch Series ====
NASCAR Busch Series results
Year	Team	No.	Make	1	2	3	4	5	6	7	8	9	10	11	12	13	14	15	16	17	18	19	20	21	22	23	24	25	26	27	28	29	30	31	32	33	34	35	NBSC	Pts	Ref
1999		28		DAY	CAR	LVS	ATL	DAR	TEX	NSV	BRI	TAL	CAL	NHA	RCH	NZH	CLT	DOV	SBO	GLN; DNQ																			161st	0	
1999		19																			MLW; DNQ	MYB	PPR	GTY	IRP	MCH	BRI	DAR	RCH	DOV	CLT	CAR	MEM	PHO	HOM				161st	0	
2001	ST Motorsports	59	Chevy	DAY	CAR	LVS	ATL	DAR	BRI	TEX	NSH	TAL	CAL	RCH	NHA	NZH	CLT	DOV	KEN	MLW	GLN	CHI	GTY	PPR	IRP	MCH	BRI	DAR	RCH	DOV	KAN	CLT	MEM	PHO	CAR	HOM; 10			96th	134	
2002	ST Motorsports	59	Chevy	DAY; 20	CAR; 22	LVS; 10	DAR; 10	BRI; 36	TEX; 11	NSH; 9	TAL; 2	CAL; 3	RCH; 12	NHA; 27	NZH; 13	CLT; 17	DOV; 21	NSH; 13	KEN; 17	MLW; 33	DAY; 10	CHI; 32	GTY; 31	PPR; 10	IRP; 16	MCH; 8	BRI; 34	DAR; 21	RCH; 18	DOV; 15	KAN; 12	CLT; 16	MEM; 2	ATL; 11	CAR; 5	PHO; 2	HOM; 13		9th	4042	
2003	ST Motorsports	59	Chevy	DAY; 38	CAR; 22	LVS; 15	DAR; 4	BRI; 15	TEX; 16	TAL; 32	NSH; 31	CAL; 21	RCH; 7	GTY; 6	NZH; 8	CLT; 18	DOV; 29	NSH; 28	**KEN**; 4	MLW; 9	DAY; 19	CHI; 19	NHA; 10	PPR; 6	IRP; 3	MCH; 17	BRI; 29	DAR; 8	RCH; 15	DOV; 12	KAN; 8	CLT; 23	MEM; 11	ATL; 23	PHO; 35	CAR; 16	HOM; 21		11th	3893	
2004	ST Motorsports	59	Ford	DAY; 31	CAR; 20	LVS; 17	DAR; 15	BRI; 19	TEX; 28	NSH; 14	TAL; 23	CAL; 3	GTY; 20	RCH; 18	NZH; 12	CLT; 26	DOV; 17	NSH; 10	KEN; 19	MLW; 20	DAY; 42	CHI; 21	NHA; 8	PPR; 2	IRP; 18	MCH; 31	BRI; 11	CAL; 24	RCH; 32	DOV; 29	KAN; 9	CLT; 26	MEM; 16	ATL; 17	PHO; 23	DAR; 20	HOM; 15		14th	3614	
2005	ST Motorsports	59	Ford	DAY; 23	CAL; 16	MXC; 28	LVS; 38	ATL; 41	NSH; 10	BRI; 16	TEX; 23	PHO; 19	TAL; 25	DAR; 31	RCH; 39	CLT; 26	DOV; 15	NSH; 16	KEN; 8	MLW; 25	DAY; 13	CHI; 28	NHA; 33	PPR; 9	GTY; 20	IRP; 12	GLN; 27	MCH; 28	BRI; 15	CAL; 32	RCH; 16	DOV; 18	KAN; 29	CLT; 20	MEM; 22	TEX; 37	PHO; 17	HOM; 17	16th	3345	
2006	ST Motorsports	59	Ford	DAY; 27	CAL; 24	MXC; 43	LVS; 33	ATL; 27	BRI; 14	TEX; 22	NSH; 20	PHO; 26	TAL; 26	RCH; 37	DAR; 14	CLT; 30	DOV; 12	NSH; 19	KEN; 24	MLW; 6	DAY; 20	CHI; 20	NHA; 25	MAR; 15	GTY; 17	IRP; 12	GLN; 30	MCH; 41	BRI; 16	CAL; 18	RCH; 34	DOV; 20	KAN; 34	CLT; 3	MEM; 24	TEX; 22	PHO; 22	HOM; 17	16th	3339	

==== Camping World Truck Series ====
NASCAR Camping World Truck Series results
Year	Team	No.	Make	1	2	3	4	5	6	7	8	9	10	11	12	13	14	15	16	17	18	19	20	21	22	23	24	25	26	27	NCWTC	Pts	Ref
1996	Shenandoah Valley Motorsports	71	Ford	HOM	PHO	POR	EVG	TUS	CNS	HPT	BRI	NZH	MLW	LVL	I70	IRP	FLM	GLN	NSV	RCH	NHA	MAR	NWS	SON	MMR	PHO	LVS; DNQ				144th	0	
1997	Impact Motorsports	86	Ford	WDW; 10	TUS; 16	HOM; 34	PHO; 33	POR; 12	EVG; 8	I70; 30	NHA; 15	TEX; 16	BRI; 25	NZH; 14	MLW; 21	LVL; 6	CNS; 3	HPT; 13	IRP; 26	FLM; 14	NSV; 5	GLN; 25	RCH; 18	MAR; 9	SON; 10	MMR; 2	CAL; 17	PHO; 14	LVS; 12		13th	3057	
1998	Impact Motorsports	86	Ford	WDW; 30	HOM; 6	**PHO**; 3	POR; 1*	EVG; 4	I70; 11	GLN; 19	TEX; 5	BRI; 37	MLW; 13	NZH; 2	CAL; 14	PPR; 7	IRP; 13	NHA; 9	**FLM**; 28*	NSV; 9	HPT; 1	LVL; 4	RCH; 23	MEM; 16	GTY; 26	MAR; 4	SON; 15	MMR; 3	PHO; 8	LVS; 17	7th	3542	
1999	Impact Motorsports	86	Dodge	HOM; 3	PHO; 4	EVG; 4	**MMR**; 3	MAR; 2	MEM; 4	PPR; 28	**I70**; 4	BRI; 2	TEX; 9	PIR; 17	GLN; 15	MLW; 10	NSV; 27	NZH; 10	**MCH**; 6	**NHA**; 3*	IRP; 2	**GTY**; 4	HPT; 21	RCH; 11	**LVS**; 6	LVL; 13	TEX; 12	CAL; 3			4th	3623	
2001	HT Motorsports	92	Dodge	DAY	HOM	MMR	MAR	GTY	DAR	PPR	DOV; 6	TEX	MEM	MLW	KAN	KEN	NHA; 9	IRP	NSH	CIC	NZH	RCH; 6	SBO	TEX	LVS	**PHO**; 4	CAL				44th	598	
2002	HT Motorsports	17	Dodge	DAY	DAR	MAR	GTY	PPR	DOV	TEX	MEM	MLW	KAN	KEN	NHA	MCH	IRP	NSH	RCH; 8	TEX	SBO	LVS	CAL	PHO; 32	HOM; 13						50th	333	
2006	Wood Brothers/JTG Racing	21	Ford	DAY; 25	CAL; 26	ATL	MAR	GTY	CLT	MFD	DOV	TEX	MCH	MLW	KAN	KEN	MEM	IRP	NSH	BRI	NHA	LVS	TAL	MAR	ATL	TEX	PHO	HOM			62nd	173	
2007	Xpress Motorsports	16	Ford	DAY; 17		ATL; 16	MAR; 21																								21st	1632	
2007	Wood Brothers/JTG Racing	09	Ford		CAL; 12			KAN; 14	CLT	MFD	DOV; 2		MCH; 12	MLW; 12			IRP; 22	NSH	BRI	GTW	NHA; 22	LVS; 8	TAL	MAR	ATL	TEX	PHO; 32	HOM			21st	1632	
2007	Wood Brothers/JTG Racing	21	Ford									TEX; 10																			21st	1632	
2007	Key Motorsports	40	Chevy												MEM; 24	KEN															21st	1632	
2008	Bobby Hamilton Racing	4	Dodge	DAY; 6	CAL; 21	ATL; 19	MAR; 35	KAN; 20	CLT; 28	MFD; 10	DOV; 23	TEX; 30	MCH; 21	MLW; 24	MEM; 10	KEN; 12	IRP; 23	NSH; 7	BRI; 31	GTW	NHA										24th	1748	
2008	HT Motorsports	59	Toyota																			LVS; 28	TAL	MAR	ATL	TEX	PHO	HOM			24th	1748	
2009	Wyler Racing	60	Toyota	DAY; 14	CAL; 15	ATL; 19	MAR; 6	KAN; 13	CLT; 9	DOV; 13	TEX; 21	MCH; 19	MLW; 6	MEM; 17	KEN; 12	IRP; 8	NSH; 15	BRI; 9	CHI; 12	IOW; 16	GTW; 8	NHA; 6	LVS; 20	MAR; 14	TAL; 7	TEX; 22	PHO; 10	HOM; 21			11th	3124	
2010	Wyler Racing	60	Toyota	DAY; 7	ATL; 19	MAR																									20th	1856	
2010	Wyler Racing	60	Chevy				NSH; 9	KAN	DOV; 13	CLT	TEX	MCH; 11	IOW; 6	GTY; 19	IRP	POC; 17	NSH	DAR; 8	BRI; 34	CHI	KEN; 12	NHA; 16	LVS	MAR; 8	TAL	TEX; 14	PHO; 14	HOM			20th	1856	

=== ARCA Bondo/Mar-Hyde Series ===
(key) (Bold – Pole position awarded by qualifying time. Italics – Pole position earned by points standings or practice time. * – Most laps led.)

ARCA Bondo/Mar-Hyde Series results
Year	Team	No.	Make	1	2	3	4	5	6	7	8	9	10	11	12	13	14	15	16	17	18	19	20	21	22	23	24	25	ABSC	Pts	Ref
1996	Monroe Racing	64	Chevy	DAY	ATL	SLM	TAL	FIF	LVL	CLT	CLT	KIL	FRS	POC	MCH; 12	FRS	TOL	POC	MCH	INF	SBS	ISF	DSF	KIL	SLM	WIN	CLT	ATL	131st	-	

=== CARS Late Model Stock Car Tour ===
(key) (Bold – Pole position awarded by qualifying time. Italics – Pole position earned by points standings or practice time. * – Most laps led. ** – All laps led.)

CARS Late Model Stock Car Tour results
Year	Team	No.	Make	1	2	3	4	5	6	7	8	9	10	CLMSCTC	Pts	Ref
2015	Steve James	60	Toyota	SNM; 8	ROU	HCY	SNM	TCM	MMS	ROU	CON	MYB	HCY	42nd	25	
