= HT Motorsports =

American truck racing team

- Owner(s): Jim & Sharon Harris
- Base: Martinsville, Virginia, United States
- Series: Camping World Truck Series
- Race drivers: Joey Logano, Darrell Waltrip, Todd Bodine, Ted Musgrave, Robert Pressley, Terry Cook, David Starr, Mike Bliss, Donny Lia
- Manufacturer: Dodge, Ford, Toyota
- Opened: 2001
- Closed: 2010

Career
- Drivers' Championships: 0
- Race victories: 0

HT Motorsports was an American truck racing team from Martinsville, Virginia, owned by trucking company owner Jim Harris. It fielded entries for the nine years in the Camping World Truck Series before suspending operations early in 2010.

== Truck No. 24 history ==
This team debuted at a test session at Homestead-Miami Speedway as the No. 92 with Terry Cook driving. He started fifteenth and finished 20th. The No. 24 originally was intended to be the No. 11 Toyota for Red Horse Racing but driver David Starr and Zachry Holdings parted ways with the team in December. This team became the No. 24 for 2009 and Starr had fourteen top-ten finishes. Zachry and Starr left the team after the 2009 season for Randy Moss Motorsports.

==== Truck No. 24 results ====
NASCAR Camping World Truck Series results
Year	Driver	No.	Make	1	2	3	4	5	6	7	8	9	10	11	12	13	14	15	16	17	18	19	20	21	22	23	24	25	NCWTC	Pts
2007	Terry Cook	92	Toyota	DAY	CAL	ATL	MAR	KAN	CLT	MFD	DOV	TEX	MCH	MLW	MEM	KEN	IRP	NSH	BRI	GTW	NHA	LVS	TAL	MAR	ATL	TEX	PHO	HOM; 20		
2009	David Starr	24	Toyota	DAY; 17	CAL; 4	ATL; 17	MAR; 24	KAN; 17	CLT; 7	DOV; 3	TEX; 7	MCH; 11	MLW; 9	MEM; 3	KEN; 9	IRP; 9	NSH; 18	BRI; 7	CHI; 22	IOW; 26	GTW; 16	NHA; 13	LVS; 15	MAR; 8	TAL; 5	TEX; 9	PHO; 9	HOM; 7		

== Truck No. 25 history ==
HT Motorsports made its NASCAR debut at New Hampshire International Speedway in 2001 as the No. 92 Learnframe Dodge. It made four starts that season with Stacy Compton and finished in the top ten in each race.

The team then ran at Martinsville Speedway in 2002 as the No. 17 Duck Head Footwear Dodge Ram driven by Darrell Waltrip. He qualified eighteenth but finished thirty-eighth. Waltrip returned at Indianapolis Raceway Park with Tide sponsorship, and finished sixth. Stacy Compton would drive three additional races that season, posting a best finish of eighth at Richmond.

In 2003, HT switched to the No. 59 and hired Robert Pressley to drive. Driving with associate sponsorship from Melling Engine Parts, Pressley finished in the top-five four times and finished thirteenth in points. Randy LaJoie ran the first two races of 2004, followed by rookie Mark McFarland. McFarland finished sixth at Mansfield Motorsports Speedway before being cycled out by LaJoie, who had an eighth-place finish at Gateway. Andy Houston drove for three races, but did not finish higher than 14th. Sammy Sanders, Bobby Hamilton Jr., and Scott Lynch finished out the year in the 59.

Pressley returned to HT in 2005, but had only three top-ten finishes and finished 20th in the standings. He was released and replaced by Mike Wallace at the beginning of 2006, but wrecked out of the two races in which he drove for the team. Steve Park became the team's new driver, as the team switched to Ford. Despite a tenth-place finish at Mansfield, he was released after ten races and replaced by Chad Chaffin. After a slow start, the team switched to Toyota and Chaffin finished eighth at Talladega Superspeedway. Terry Cook was named the driver of the 59 for 2007, and had two top-tens and finished fourteenth in points. He was released at the end of the season for Whelen Modified driver Donny Lia, who raced the last race of the season.

For 2008, Ted Musgrave will move to the No. 59 team, bringing along his ASE sponsorship. In August 2008 ASE announced they will be leaving NASCAR. After 18 races in season, and a wreck in the 1st practice at Las Vegas Motor Speedway, Musgrave & HT Motorsports parted ways. Stacy Compton replaced him later in the day. Joey Logano made his truck series debut at Talladega starting sixth but crashing early. Terry Cook, recently released from Wyler Racing, drove the No. 59 for the rest of the '08 season. The team switched to the No. 25 for 2009 with Cook returning. He had nine top-tens but was replaced in the final two races by Mike Bliss.

==== Truck No. 25 results ====
NASCAR Camping World Truck Series results
Year	Driver	No.	Make	1	2	3	4	5	6	7	8	9	10	11	12	13	14	15	16	17	18	19	20	21	22	23	24	25	NCWTC	Pts
2001	Stacy Compton	92	Dodge	DAY	HOM	MMR	MAR	GTY	DAR	PPR	DOV; 6	TEX	MEM	MLW	KAN	KEN	NHA; 9	IRP	NSH	CIC	NZH	RCH; 6	SBO	TEX	LVS	PHO; 4	CAL			
2002	Darrell Waltrip	17	Dodge	DAY	DAR	MAR; 34	GTY	PPR	DOV	TEX	MEM	MLW	KAN	KEN	NHA	MCH	IRP; 6	NSH												
2002	Stacy Compton	17	Dodge																RCH; 8	TEX				PHO; 32	HOM; 13					
2002	Andy Houston	17	Dodge																		SBO; 21	LVS	CAL							
2003	Robert Pressley	59	Dodge	DAY; 3	DAR; 10	MMR; 11	MAR; 17	CLT; 31	DOV; 10	TEX; 26	MEM	MLW	KAN; 5	KEN; 8	GTW	MCH; 14	IRP; 18	NSH; 15	BRI; 2	RCH; 2	NHA; 14	CAL; 11	LVS; 11	SBO; 10	TEX; 13	MAR; 27	PHO; 8	HOM; 26		
2004	Randy LaJoie	59	Dodge	DAY; 34	ATL; 14									KEN; 32	GTW; 8	MCH; 14			BRI; 35											
2004	Mark McFarland	59	Dodge			MAR; 21	MFD; 6	CLT; 28	DOV; 35	TEX	MEM; 33						IRP; 29	NSH; 29		RCH; DNQ										
2004	Andy Houston	59	Dodge									MLW; 19									NHA; 33	LVS; 14	CAL; 21							
2004	Todd Bodine	59	Dodge										KAN; 15																	
2004	Sammy Sanders	59	Dodge																					TEX; 22						
2004	Bobby Hamilton Jr.	59	Dodge																						MAR; 9		DAR; 27			
2004	Scott Lynch	59	Dodge																							PHO; 27		HOM; DNQ		
2005	Robert Pressley	59	Dodge	DAY; 15	CAL; 24	ATL; 20	MAR; 25	GTW; 8	MFD; 25	CLT; 22	DOV; 26	TEX; 31	MCH; 17	MLW; 14	KAN; 33	KEN; 17	MEM; 32	IRP; 7	NSH; 25	BRI; 17	RCH; 8	NHA; 14	LVS; 24	MAR; 31	ATL; 27	TEX; 26	PHO; 22	HOM; 24		
2006	Mike Wallace	59	Dodge	DAY; 31	CAL; 31																									
2006	Steve Park	59	Ford			ATL; 25			CLT; 28		DOV; 21	TEX; 21	MCH; 31	MLW; 16	KAN; 14															
2006	Steve Park	59	Dodge				MAR; 36	GTY; 18		MFD; 10																				
2006	Chad Chaffin	59	Ford													KEN; 17	MEM; 29	IRP; 32	NSH; 15	BRI; 11										
2006	Chad Chaffin	59	Toyota																		NHA; 27	LVS; 25	TAL; 8	MAR; 11	ATL; 32	TEX; 19	PHO; 23	HOM; 36		
2007	Terry Cook	59	Toyota	DAY; 27	CAL; 30	ATL; 17	MAR; 15	KAN; 9	CLT; 16	MFD; 12	DOV; 8	TEX; 12	MCH; 11	MLW; 13	MEM; 29	KEN; 31	IRP; 26	NSH; 18	BRI; 32	GTW; 30	NHA; 18	LVS; 4	TAL; 28	MAR; 29*	ATL; 10	TEX; 12	PHO; 21			
2007	Donny Lia	59	Toyota																									HOM; 25		
2008	Ted Musgrave	59	Toyota	DAY; 28	CAL; 6	ATL; 7	MAR; 15	KAN; 10	CLT; 22	MFD; 17	DOV; 11	TEX; 28	MCH; 24	MLW; 19	MEM; 20	KEN; 13	IRP; 20	NSH; 8	BRI; 10	GTW; 10	NHA; 17									
2008	Stacy Compton	59	Toyota																			LVS; 28								
2008	Joey Logano	59	Toyota																				TAL; 26							
2008	Terry Cook	59	Toyota																					MAR; 16	ATL; 28	TEX; 6	PHO; 11	HOM; 9		
2009	Terry Cook	25	Toyota	DAY; 3	CAL; 25	ATL; 5	MAR; 16	KAN; 20	CLT; 5	DOV; 10	TEX; 20	MCH; 10	MLW; 10	MEM; 13	KEN; 15	IRP; 13	NSH; 19	BRI; 15	CHI; 10	IOW; 11	GTW; 21	NHA; 16	LVS; 26	MAR; 10	TAL; 4	TEX; 24				
2009	Mike Bliss	25	Toyota																								PHO; 7	HOM; 31		
