= 2001 Pepsi 400 (Daytona) =

NASCAR race at Daytona in 2001

Race details
- Race 17 of 36 in the 2001 NASCAR Winston Cup Series
- 2001 Pepsi 400 program cover
- Date: July 7, 2001
- Location: Daytona International Speedway, Daytona Beach, Florida
- Course: Permanent racing facility
- Course length: 2.5 miles (4.02 km)
- Distance: 160 laps, 400 mi (643.27 km)
- Weather: Temperatures reaching up to 89.1 °F (31.7 °C); wind speeds approaching 11.10 miles per hour (17.86 km/h)
- Average speed: 157.601 mph (253.634 km/h)

Pole position
Driver	Sterling Marlin	Chip Ganassi Racing

Most laps led
Driver	Dale Earnhardt Jr.	Dale Earnhardt, Inc.
- Laps: 116

Winner
No. 8	Dale Earnhardt Jr.	Dale Earnhardt, Inc.

Television in the United States
- Network: NBC
- Announcers: Allen Bestwick, Benny Parsons, Wally Dallenbach Jr.
- Nielsen ratings: 6.1/13 (25 million viewers)

Radio in the United States
- Radio: MRN
- Booth announcers: Joe Moore, Barney Hall
- Turn announcers: Kurt Becker (1 & 2), Dave Moody (Backstretch) and Kevin O'Neal (3 & 4)

The 2001 Pepsi 400 was a NASCAR Winston Cup Series stock car race held on July 7, 2001, at Daytona International Speedway in Daytona Beach, Florida as the 17th of the 2001 NASCAR Winston Cup Series season. It was the first race held at Daytona since the 2001 Daytona 500, in which Dale Earnhardt was killed on the final lap. Sterling Marlin of Chip Ganassi Racing won the pole position. Dale Earnhardt Jr. of Dale Earnhardt, Inc. won the race, while DEI teammate Michael Waltrip and Elliott Sadler finished second and third, respectively. The race is often regarded as one of the greatest races in NASCAR history.

== Entry list ==
(R) denotes rookie driver

No.	Driver	Team	Manufacturer
01	Jason Leffler (R)	Chip Ganassi Racing with Felix Sabates	Dodge
1	Steve Park	Dale Earnhardt Inc.	Chevrolet
2	Rusty Wallace	Penske Racing	Ford
4	Kevin Lepage	Morgan-McClure Motorsports	Chevrolet
5	Terry Labonte	Hendrick Motorsports	Chevrolet
6	Mark Martin	Roush Racing	Ford
7	Mike Wallace	Ultra Motorsports	Ford
8	Dale Earnhardt Jr.	Dale Earnhardt Inc.	Chevrolet
9	Bill Elliott	Evernham Motorsports	Dodge
10	Johnny Benson	MBV Motorsports	Pontiac
11	Brett Bodine	Brett Bodine Racing	Ford
12	Jeremy Mayfield	Penske Racing	Ford
14	Ron Hornaday Jr. (R)	A. J. Foyt Racing	Pontiac
15	Michael Waltrip	Dale Earnhardt Inc.	Chevrolet
17	Matt Kenseth	Roush Racing	Ford
18	Bobby Labonte	Joe Gibbs Racing	Pontiac
19	Casey Atwood (R)	Evernham Motorsports	Dodge
20	Tony Stewart	Joe Gibbs Racing	Pontiac
21	Elliott Sadler	Wood Brothers Racing	Ford
22	Ward Burton	Bill Davis Racing	Dodge
24	Jeff Gordon	Hendrick Motorsports	Chevrolet
25	Jerry Nadeau	Hendrick Motorsports	Chevrolet
26	Jimmy Spencer	Haas-Carter Motorsports	Ford
27	Mike Bliss	Eel River Racing	Pontiac
28	Ricky Rudd	Robert Yates Racing	Ford
29	Kevin Harvick (R)	Richard Childress Racing	Chevrolet
31	Mike Skinner	Richard Childress Racing	Chevrolet
32	Ricky Craven	PPI Motorsports	Ford
33	Joe Nemechek	Andy Petree Racing	Chevrolet
36	Ken Schrader	MBV Motorsports	Pontiac
40	Sterling Marlin	Chip Ganassi Racing with Felix Sabates	Dodge
43	John Andretti	Petty Enterprises	Dodge
44	Buckshot Jones	Petty Enterprises	Dodge
45	Kyle Petty	Petty Enterprises	Dodge
49	Andy Hillenburg	BAM Racing	Pontiac
50	Rick Mast	Midwest Transit Racing	Chevrolet
51	Jeff Purvis	Phoenix Racing	Ford
55	Bobby Hamilton	Andy Petree Racing	Chevrolet
66	Todd Bodine	Haas-Carter Motorsports	Ford
71	Dave Marcis	Marcis Auto Racing	Chevrolet
77	Robert Pressley	Jasper Motorsports	Ford
88	Dale Jarrett	Robert Yates Racing	Ford
90	Hut Stricklin	Donlavey Racing	Ford
92	Stacy Compton	Melling Racing	Dodge
93	Dave Blaney	Bill Davis Racing	Dodge
96	Andy Houston (R)	PPI Motorsports	Ford
97	Kurt Busch (R)	Roush Racing	Ford
99	Jeff Burton	Roush Racing	Ford

== Qualifying ==
Qualifying was scheduled for July 5, but was rained out; rain also delayed the start of qualifying the next day. On the ten-year anniversary of his first career pole position, Sterling Marlin clinched the pole with a lap speed of 183.778 miles per hour (295.762 km/h). Dodge drivers claimed the first four spots, with Ward Burton (183.597 mph (295.471 km/h)), Stacy Compton (182.678 mph (293.992 km/h)) and Casey Atwood (182.597 mph (293.861 km/h)). Chevrolet driver and Cup points leader Jeff Gordon qualified fifth at 182.312 mph (293.403 km/h). Buckshot Jones, Ron Hornaday Jr., Hut Stricklin, Mike Bliss and Andy Hillenburg failed to qualify.

== Race ==
The Rev. Hal Marchman gave the traditional invocation, Edwin McCain sang the National Anthem, and Pop singer Britney Spears gave the command to start the engines. Ward Burton took the lead from Sterling Marlin on lap one, but relinquished it to Marlin on lap three. After Kevin Harvick, Marlin and Michael Waltrip shared the lead from laps 10 to 26, Dale Earnhardt Jr. took the lead on lap 27, leading 22 laps. Matt Kenseth and Todd Bodine would lead for a combined seven laps, before Earnhardt reclaimed the lead and led 33 more laps. The first caution of the race flew on lap 89, when Andy Houston crashed in turn 4. Robert Pressley took the lead on lap 90, which Earnhardt reclaimed the following lap. With 18 laps to go, cars entered pit road for final stops, but ten cars (Mike Skinner, Pressley, Sterling Marlin, Jeff Gordon, Kurt Busch, Terry Labonte, Bobby Hamilton, Kevin Harvick, John Andretti, Mark Martin, Dave Marcis, Jason Leffler) were involved in a crash in turn 4. Earnhardt would surrender the lead again to Johnny Benson Jr., who had made a late-race gamble to pull ahead. Dale Jr had to deal with lap traffic on the restart, but the Caution flew for the final time when Jeff Gordon's oil line cut. The race restarted with six laps to go with Johnny Benson still leading. But with five laps remaining, Earnhardt took back the lead, and with drafting assistance from Waltrip, claimed the victory. Elliott Sadler, Ward Burton and Bobby Labonte finished in the top five. Tony Stewart crossed the line in sixth, but was officially classified in 26th due to receiving the black flag, had his finishing spot taken by Jerry Nadeau; Rusty Wallace, Jeff Burton, Brett Bodine and Mike Wallace rounded out the top ten.

== Post-race ==
To celebrate, Earnhardt climbed onto his car's roof, and shared an embrace with Waltrip (who had been unable to celebrate his victory in the 500 that February because of Dale Earnhardt's fatal crash) before diving into his pit crew.

After the race, Tony Stewart, who ignored a black flag and orders to return to pit road due to passing Johnny Benson and Dave Blaney below the track's yellow line, knocked a tape recorder away from a Winston-Salem Journal reporter and kicked it under a hauler, and attempted to confront Cup director Gary Nelson, but was restrained by owner Joe Gibbs and crew chief Greg Zipadelli. Stewart argued that he had been forced below the yellow line by Benson. Stewart was later fined $10,000, had his probation (dating back to spinning out Jeff Gordon at Bristol Motor Speedway) extended and was penalized 65 points.

== Race results ==
Pos.	Car #	Driver	Make	Team
1	8	Dale Earnhardt Jr.	Chevrolet	Dale Earnhardt Inc.
2	15	Michael Waltrip	Chevrolet	Dale Earnhardt Inc.
3	21	Elliott Sadler	Ford	Wood Brothers Racing
4	22	Ward Burton	Dodge	Bill Davis Racing
5	18	Bobby Labonte	Pontiac	Joe Gibbs Racing
6	25	Jerry Nadeau	Chevrolet	Hendrick Motorsports
7	2	Rusty Wallace	Ford	Penske Racing
8	99	Jeff Burton	Ford	Roush Racing
9	11	Brett Bodine	Ford	Brett Bodine Racing
10	7	Mike Wallace	Ford	Ultra Motorsports
11	88	Dale Jarrett	Ford	Robert Yates Racing
12	66	Todd Bodine	Ford	Haas-Carter Motorsports
13	10	Johnny Benson	Pontiac	MBV Motorsports
14	28	Ricky Rudd	Ford	Robert Yates Racing
15	36	Ken Schrader	Pontiac	MBV Motorsports
16	17	Matt Kenseth	Ford	Roush Racing
17	12	Jeremy Mayfield	Ford	Penske Racing
18	6	Mark Martin	Ford	Roush Racing
19	26	Jimmy Spencer	Ford	Haas-Carter Motorsports
20	1	Steve Park	Chevrolet	Dale Earnhardt Inc.
21	93	Dave Blaney	Dodge	Bill Davis Racing
22	43	John Andretti	Dodge	Petty Enterprises
23	77	Robert Pressley	Ford	Jasper Motorsports
24	01	Jason Leffler (R)	Dodge	Chip Ganassi Racing with Felix Sabates
25	29	Kevin Harvick (R)	Chevrolet	Richard Childress Racing
26	20	Tony Stewart	Pontiac	Joe Gibbs Racing
27	33	Joe Nemechek	Chevrolet	Andy Petree Racing
28	19	Casey Atwood (R)	Dodge	Evernham Motorsports
29	45	Kyle Petty	Dodge	Petty Enterprises
30	97	Kurt Busch (R)	Ford	Roush Racing
31	4	Kevin Lepage	Chevrolet	Morgan-McClure Motorsports
32	92	Stacy Compton	Dodge	Melling Racing
33	32	Ricky Craven	Ford	PPI Motorsports
34	50	Rick Mast	Chevrolet	Midwest Transit Racing
35	9	Bill Elliott	Dodge	Evernham Motorsports
36	71	Dave Marcis	Chevrolet	Marcis Auto Racing
37	24	Jeff Gordon	Chevrolet	Hendrick Motorsports
38	55	Bobby Hamilton	Chevrolet	Andy Petree Racing
39	40	Sterling Marlin	Chevrolet	Chip Ganassi Racing with Felix Sabates
40	5	Terry Labonte	Chevrolet	Hendrick Motorsports
41	31	Mike Skinner	Chevrolet	Richard Childress Racing
42	51	Jeff Purvis	Ford	Phoenix Racing
43	96	Andy Houston (R)	Ford	PPI Motorsports

=== Failed to Qualify ===
- 44 - Buckshot Jones
- 14 - Ron Hornaday Jr. (R)
- 90 - Hut Stricklin
- 27 - Mike Bliss
- 49 - Andy Hillenburg

== Standings after the race ==
Pos	Driver	Points
1	Jeff Gordon	2403
2	Dale Jarrett	2355
3	Ricky Rudd	2327
4	Tony Stewart	2207
5	Rusty Wallace	2184
6	Sterling Marlin	2159
7	Bobby Labonte	2061
8	Johnny Benson Jr.	2051
9	Dale Earnhardt Jr.	2010
10	Kevin Harvick	1987

== Broadcasting ==
The 2001 Pepsi 400 was broadcast by NBC, as the first race broadcast by the network under a new centralized NASCAR contract which gave a consortium of NBC Sports and Turner Sports rights to broadcast the second half of the season.

25 million viewers watched the race, setting a viewership record for night races.

Previous race: 2001 Dodge/Save Mart 350	Winston Cup Series; 2001 season	Next race: 2001 Tropicana 400
