= Andy Houston =

American racing driver (born 1970)

- Born: November 7, 1970 (age 56); Hickory, North Carolina, U.S.
- Achievements: 1994 Hickory Motor Speedway Late Model Champion
- Awards: 1996 NASCAR Dash Series Most Popular Driver

NASCAR Cup Series career
- 22 races run over 2 years
- Best finish: 46th (2001)
- First race: 2000 Pepsi 400 Presented by Meijer (Michigan)
- Last race: 2001 Protection One 400 (Kansas)
Wins	Top tens	Poles
0	0	0

NASCAR O'Reilly Auto Parts Series career
- 7 races run over 5 years
- Best finish: 68th (2002)
- First race: 1996 Kroger 200 (IRP)
- Last race: 2002 Sam's Town 300 (Las Vegas)
Wins	Top tens	Poles
0	1	0

NASCAR FedEx Freight Truck Series career
- 121 races run over 8 years
- Best finish: 3rd (2000)
- First race: 1997 Cummins 200 (IRP)
- Last race: 2005 O'Reilly 200 presented by Valvoline Maxlife (Bristol)
- First win: 1998 Pennzoil/VIP Discount Tripleheader (Loudon)
- Last win: 2000 LINE-X 225 (Portland)
Wins	Top tens	Poles
3	51	4
- Statistics up to date as of July 10, 2012.

Andrew Houston (born November 7, 1970) is an American stock car racing spotter and former driver. He is a veteran of the NASCAR Craftsman Truck Series, scoring three wins.

Houston is the son of legendary Busch driver Tommy Houston and the youngest of three brothers, one of them being part-time NASCAR driver Marty Houston and the other being the oldest of the three, Scott Houston. He is also the cousin of former team owner Teresa Earnhardt. Houston has also raced in the Winston Cup Series and the Busch Series. Houston is married to wife Lorie and has two children, Collin (born in 1997) and Clark (born in 2001).

== Early racing career ==
Houston won Hickory Motor Speedway's Late Model Championship in 1994, and, in 1996, he won the Goody's Dash Series Most Popular Driver Award.

== NASCAR career ==
=== Cup Series ===
2000 marked Houston's first start in the Winston Cup Series as he competed in five races to prepare for his 2001 rookie campaign with PPI Motorsports. Out of the five races his best finish would come at Lowe's Motor Speedway, a 26th. Houston began the year 2001 well with a ninth place qualifying effort at the Daytona 500 in the No. 96 McDonald's Ford. It would be one of the highlights of the year, as Houston ended the year with no top-tens and a best finish of seventeenth at Martinsville; Houston only managed to qualify for seventeen races and his team folded after McDonald's pulled its sponsorship late in the season. He has not returned to the Cup Series since.

=== Busch Series ===
Houston made his Busch Series debut in 1996 driving the No. 0 Suburban Propane Ford at Indianapolis Raceway Park. He would start the race in the 21st position and finish in the 24th position, five laps down. He returned to the series in 1998 to make another start this time at Hickory Motor Speedway in the No. 50 Dr Pepper Ford. He would start the race in seventh and finish twentieth. In 2000, Houston made one start for Team SABCO and brought the No. 82 Channellock Chevrolet home in the 36th position at the Milwaukee Mile. For the 2002 season, Houston was supposed to run the whole season with the Herzog-Jackson Motorsports team, but was released and replaced by Todd Bodine after Las Vegas Due to "performance issues". His best finish with the team was a ninth at Daytona.

=== Truck Series ===
In 1997, Houston made his first Craftsman Truck Series start with Addington Racing. He would compete in four races for the team with a best finish of 11th at Martinsville. For the 1998 season, he returned to Addington Racing and ran full-time in the Truck Series. Houston would have a solid year winning his first race at New Hampshire International Speedway and posting nine top-tens, while finishing 12th in points. Houston again returned to Addington Racing for the 1999 season and he scored fourteen top-tens with an eighth-place finish in points. 2000 was a breakout year for Houston, as he won two races at Homestead and Portland, had thirteen top-fives, and eighteen top-tens, finishing third in points to Roush Racing teammates Greg Biffle and Kurt Busch. He returned to the series in 2002 with Melling Racing where he ran one race at South Boston Speedway. After that Billy Ballew Motorsports hired him to run the remainder of 2002. He would post a best finish of twelfth at California out of the five races he competed in. In 2003, Houston was still running races for Billy Ballew and Nelly when Vokal became his primary sponsor, until Billy ran out of money to run two trucks. Ballew kept Rich Bickle, leaving Houston without a ride. Later that year, Ultra Motorsports gave him a truck ride and he did very well, finishing no worse than tenth and earned a pole at Texas Motor Speedway. For the 2004 season, he continued driving for Ultra Motorsports until he was released after the race at Bristol. Andy's best finish with the team that year was a seventh at Dover. For the remainder of 2004 with the exception of Richmond, Houston raced with multiple teams, but with limited success. In 2005, he only ran one race with Key Motorsports at Bristol Motor Speedway, finishing 33rd after a crash in his final NASCAR race.

== Post-racing career ==
Following his racing career, Houston worked as a spotter for other drivers; he worked with Richard Childress Racing, spotting for Austin Dillon in the Nationwide Series in the early 2010s, moving up with Dillon to the Sprint Cup Series in 2014. He left Dillon's team after the 2019 season. He announced in November 2019 on Twitter that he would spot for Cole Custer for the 2020 season in Custer's rookie campaign. He also spotted for Ryan Preece in 2023. He spotted for Noah Gragson in 2024 and Cole Custer in 2025 and 2026.

== Motorsports career results ==
=== NASCAR ===
(key) (Bold – Pole position awarded by qualifying time. Italics – Pole position earned by points standings or practice time. * – Most laps led.)

==== Winston Cup Series ====
NASCAR Winston Cup Series results
Year	Team	No.	Make	1	2	3	4	5	6	7	8	9	10	11	12	13	14	15	16	17	18	19	20	21	22	23	24	25	26	27	28	29	30	31	32	33	34	35	36	NWCC	Pts	Ref
2000	PPI Motorsports	96	Ford	DAY	CAR	LVS	ATL	DAR	BRI	TEX	MAR	TAL	CAL	RCH	CLT	DOV	MCH	POC	SON	DAY	NHA	POC	IND	GLN	MCH; 35	BRI	DAR	RCH	NHA	DOV	MAR	CLT; 26	TAL	CAR; 28	PHO; 36	HOM; 42	ATL			55th	314	
2001	PPI Motorsports	96	Ford	DAY; 38	CAR; DNQ	LVS; DNQ	ATL; 21	DAR; DNQ	BRI; 39	TEX; 32	MAR; 17	TAL; 21	CAL; 19	RCH; 42	CLT; 41	DOV; 23	MCH; DNQ	POC; DNQ	SON; DNQ	DAY; 43	CHI; 43	NHA	POC	IND; 43	GLN	MCH; 31	BRI; 40	DAR; DNQ	RCH; DNQ	DOV; 40	KAN; 18	CLT	MAR	TAL	PHO	CAR	HOM	ATL	NHA	46th	1187	

===== Daytona 500 =====
Year	Team	Manufacturer	Start	Finish
2001	PPI Motorsports	Ford	9	38

==== Busch Series ====
NASCAR Busch Series results
Year	Team	No.	Make	1	2	3	4	5	6	7	8	9	10	11	12	13	14	15	16	17	18	19	20	21	22	23	24	25	26	27	28	29	30	31	32	33	34	NBSC	Pts	Ref
1993				DAY	CAR	RCH	DAR	BRI	HCY	ROU	MAR	NZH	CLT	DOV	MYB	GLN	MLW	TAL	IRP	MCH	NHA	BRI	DAR	RCH	DOV	ROU	CLT	MAR	CAR	HCY; DNQ	ATL							NA	-	
1995				DAY	CAR	RCH	ATL	NSV	DAR	BRI	HCY; DNQ	NHA	NZH	CLT	DOV	MYB	GLN	MLW	TAL	SBO	IRP	MCH	BRI	DAR	RCH	DOV	CLT	CAR	HOM									NA	-	
1996	Houston Racing	0	Ford	DAY	CAR	RCH	ATL	NSV	DAR	BRI	HCY; QL^{†}	NZH	CLT	DOV	SBO	MYB	GLN	MLW	NHA	TAL	IRP; 24	MCH	BRI	DAR	RCH	DOV	CLT	CAR	HOM									89th	91	
1998	Washington-Erving Motorsports	50	Ford	DAY	CAR	LVS	NSV	DAR	BRI	TEX	HCY; 20	TAL	NHA	NZH	CLT	DOV	RCH	PPR	GLN	MLW	MYB	CAL	SBO	IRP	MCH	BRI	DAR	RCH	DOV	CLT	GTY	CAR	ATL	HOM				102nd	103	
2000	Team SABCO	82	Chevy	DAY	CAR	LVS	ATL	DAR	BRI	TEX	NSV	TAL	CAL	RCH	NHA	CLT	DOV	SBO	MYB	GLN	MLW; 36	NZH	PPR	GTY	IRP	MCH	BRI	DAR	RCH	DOV	CLT	CAR	MEM	PHO	HOM			106th	55	
2001	Team Rensi Motorsports	25	Chevy	DAY	CAR	LVS	ATL	DAR	BRI	TEX	NSH	TAL	CAL	RCH	NHA	NZH	CLT	DOV	KEN	MLW	GLN	CHI	GTY; 17	PPR	IRP	MCH	BRI	DAR	RCH	DOV	KAN	CLT	MEM	PHO	CAR	HOM		101st	112	
2002	Herzog-Jackson Motorsports	92	Chevy	DAY; 9	CAR; 17	LVS; 24	DAR	BRI	TEX	NSH	TAL	CAL	RCH	NHA	NZH	CLT	DOV	NSH	KEN	MLW	DAY	CHI	GTY	PPR	IRP	MCH	BRI	DAR	RCH	DOV	KAN	CLT	MEM	ATL	CAR	PHO	HOM	68th	346	
^{†} - Qualified but replaced by his father, Tommy Houston

==== Craftsman Truck Series ====
NASCAR Craftsman Truck Series results
Year	Team	No.	Make	1	2	3	4	5	6	7	8	9	10	11	12	13	14	15	16	17	18	19	20	21	22	23	24	25	26	27	NCTC	Pts	Ref
1997	AAG Racing	65	Chevy	WDW	TUS	HOM	PHO	POR	EVG	I70	NHA	TEX	BRI	NZH	MLW	LVL	CNS	HPT	IRP; 18	FLM	NSV; 24	GLN	RCH; DNQ	MAR; 11	SON	MMR	CAL	PHO; 32	LVS; DNQ		46th	441	
1998	Addington Racing	60	Chevy	WDW; 27	HOM; 20	PHO; 4	POR; 16	EVG; 28	I70; 10	GLN; 15	TEX; 2	BRI; 28	MLW; 29	NZH; 15	**CAL**; 4	PPR; 18	IRP; 26	NHA; 1*	FLM; 20	NSV; 13	HPT; 32	LVL; 3	RCH; 12	MEM; 34	GTY; 30	MAR; 12	SON; 6	MMR; 9	PHO; 5	LVS; 11	12th	3188	
1999	Addington Racing	60	Chevy	HOM; 5	PHO; 3	EVG; 14	MMR; 19	MAR; 17	MEM; 7	PPR; 4	I70; 3	BRI; 4	TEX; 7	PIR; 7	GLN; 8	MLW; 20	NSV; 6	NZH; 11	MCH; 19	NHA; 7	IRP; 8	GTY; 25	HPT; 11	RCH; 6	LVS; 22	LVL; 12	TEX; 8	**CAL**; 18			8th	3359	
2000	Addington Racing	60	Chevy	DAY; 3	HOM; 1*	PHO; 3	MMR; 10	MAR; 11	PIR; 1	GTY; 24	MEM; 15	**PPR**; 3	EVG; 8	TEX; 4	KEN; 9	GLN; 6	MLW; 5	NHA; 5	NZH; 11	MCH; 4	IRP; 26	NSV; 6	CIC; 4	RCH; 25	DOV; 4	TEX; 2	CAL; 2*				3rd	3566	
2002	Midgley Racing	09	Chevy	DAY	DAR	MAR	GTY	PPR; QL^{†}	DOV	TEX	MEM	MLW	KAN	KEN	NHA	MCH	IRP	NSH	RCH	TEX											38th	578	
2002	HT Motorsports	17	Dodge																		SBO; 21										38th	578	
2002	Billy Ballew Motorsports	15	Ford																			LVS; 12	CAL; 12	PHO; 17	HOM; 17						38th	578	
2003	Billy Ballew Motorsports	15	Ford	DAY; 5	DAR; 21	MMR; 12	MAR; 15																								21st	1487	
2003	Fasscore Motorsports	9	Ford					CLT; 30	DOV	TEX	MEM	MLW	KAN	KEN	GTW	MCH	IRP	NSH	BRI	RCH	NHA										21st	1487	
2003	Ultra Motorsports	2	Dodge																			CAL; 6	LVS; 6	SBO; 6	**TEX**; 5	MAR	PHO; 10	HOM; 4			21st	1487	
2004	Ultra Motorsports	2	Dodge	DAY; 30	ATL; 19	MAR; 11	MFD; 15	CLT; 19	DOV; 7	TEX; 9	MEM; 20		KAN; 31	KEN; 8	GTW; 13	MCH; 23	IRP; 19	NSH; 25	BRI; 19	RCH											20th	2540	
2004	HT Motorsports	59	Ford									MLW; 19									NHA; 33	LVS; 14	CAL; 21								20th	2540	
2004	Green Light Racing	07	Chevy																					TEX; 14			DAR; 34				20th	2540	
2004	ThorSport Racing	13	Chevy																						MAR; 25	PHO; 16					20th	2540	
2004	Ken Weaver Racing	20	Chevy																									HOM; 18			20th	2540	
2005	Key Motorsports	40	Chevy	DAY	CAL	ATL	MAR	GTY	MFD	CLT	DOV	TEX	MCH	MLW	KAN	KEN	MEM	IRP	NSH	BRI; 33	RCH; DNQ	NHA	LVS	MAR	ATL	TEX	PHO	HOM			86th	64	
^{†} - Qualified for Mike Hamby.

==== Winston West Series ====
NASCAR Winston West Series results
Year	Team	No.	Make	1	2	3	4	5	6	7	8	9	10	11	12	13	14	NWWSC	Pts	Ref
1998	Addington Racing	92	Chevy	TUS	LVS	PHO	CAL	HPT	MMR	AMP	POR	CAL	PPR	EVG	SON	MMR	LVS; 1*	54th	185	
1999	Midgley Racing	09	Pontiac	TUS	LVS	PHO	CAL	PPR	MMR	IRW	EVG	POR	IRW	RMR	LVS	MMR	MOT; 17	70th	112	

==== Goody's Dash Series ====
NASCAR Goody's Dash Series results
Year	Team	No.	Make	1	2	3	4	5	6	7	8	9	10	11	12	13	14	15	16	17	18	19	20	21	NGDS	Pts	Ref
1996	N/A	30	Pontiac	DAY; 35	HOM; 3	MYB; 4	SUM; 3	NSV; 25	TRI; 23	CAR; 21	HCY; 17	FLO; 3	BRI; 15	SUM	GRE; 4	SNM; 5	BGS	MYB; 3	LAN; 13	STH	FLO; 6	NWS; 6	VOL; 3	HCY; 15	11th	2412	
1997	N/A	30	Pontiac	DAY; 31	HOM	KIN	MYB	LAN	CAR	TRI	FLO	HCY	BRI	GRE	SNM	CLT	MYB	LAN	SUM	STA	HCY	USA	CON	HOM	88th	70	
