= Herzog–Jackson Motorsports =

- Owner(s): Bill Herzog; Randy Herzog; Stan Herzog; Reggie Jackson
- Base: Concord, North Carolina
- Series: NASCAR Busch Series; SODA
- Race drivers: Todd Bodine, Jeff Green, Andy Houston, Jimmie Johnson
- Manufacturer: Chevrolet
- Opened: 1999
- Closed: 2003

Career
- Races competed: 123 (Busch Series)
- Drivers' Championships: 0
- Race victories: 3

Herzog–Jackson Motorsports was a NASCAR Busch Series team based in Concord, North Carolina. Originating as Herzog Motorsports, the team was owned by Bill, Randy, and Stan Herzog. In its final year, the team was co-owned by former Oakland A's and New York Yankees player Reggie Jackson. The team is notable for fielding future NASCAR National Series champions Todd Bodine and Jimmie Johnson.

== SODA ==
Herzog Motorsports started as an off-road racing team. The team won the 1998 SODA Pro-2 (rear wheel drive) championship with rookie driver Ricky Johnson, who won 6 of 16 events.

== NASCAR Busch Series ==
HJM debuted in 1999 as Herzog Motorsports with SODA and ASA driver Jimmie Johnson, who had previously worked with them in SODA. The team ran full-time in 2000, sponsored by wireless company Alltel. Johnson would finish 10th in the points and place third in the 2000 Rookie of the Year points, behind Ron Hornaday Jr. and Kevin Harvick. Johnson's rookie year was notable for a crash at Watkins Glen International, where his brakes failed heading into turn 1 and he slammed the barrier head on. He was not injured and even pumped his fists after exiting the car. After Alltel left for Penske Racing, Johnson remained with the team for 2001, sponsored by Excedrin. Johnson gave the team its first ever win at the inaugural race at Chicagoland Speedway. Herzog's plans were to field a Cup team with Johnson, but he had already signed a deal with Hendrick Motorsports for 2002. Herzog hired Andy Houston for the 2002 season, but they would release him after Las Vegas due to "performance issues" as they would replace him with Todd Bodine. Bodine would take the team's second win at Kentucky Speedway and finished 23rd in points. After Excedrin's departure, Herzog Motorsports joined with former baseball player Reggie Jackson to form Herzog–Jackson Motorsports in 2003. With Bodine back at the wheel, the team took its third and final victory at Darlington Raceway. Despite the added presence of fame, the team had sponsors for a few races, but could not attract a major sponsor to pay the bills, despite Bodine leading the points. Troubles were evident when the team skipped the Chicago race and Bodine was released. HJM returned at Kansas with Jeff Green, who finished 11th. Before shutting down, they ran one more race with Green at Homestead, finishing 27th.

=== Busch Series results ===
NASCAR Busch Series results
Year	Team	No.	Make	1	2	3	4	5	6	7	8	9	10	11	12	13	14	15	16	17	18	19	20	21	22	23	24	25	26	27	28	29	30	31	32	33	34	NNSC	Pts	Ref
1999	Jimmie Johnson	92	Chevy	DAY	CAR	LVS	ATL	DAR	TEX	NSV	BRI	TAL	CAL	NHA	RCH	NZH	CLT	DOV	SBO	GLN	MLW; 7	MYB	PPR	GTY	IRP	MCH	BRI	DAR	RCH	DOV	CLT	CAR; 25	MEM; 12	PHO; 18	HOM; 39			58th	521	
2000	Jimmie Johnson	92	Chevy	DAY; DNQ	CAR; 22	LVS; 26	ATL; 27	DAR; 36	BRI; 24	TEX; 24	NSV; 10	TAL; 29	CAL; 15	RCH; 12	NHA; 13	CLT; 16	DOV; 20	SBO; 6	MYB; 15	GLN; 43	MLW; 9	NZH; 14	PPR; 18	GTY; 13	IRP; 11	MCH; 6	BRI; 23	DAR; 38	RCH; 22	DOV; 18	CLT; 28	CAR; 13	MEM; 8	PHO; 40	HOM; 6			10th	3271	
2001	Jimmie Johnson	92	Chevy	DAY; 5	CAR; 13	LVS; 14	ATL; 9	DAR; 32	BRI; 4	TEX; 8	NSH; 28	TAL; 28	CAL; 16	RCH; 12	NHA; 13	NZH; 9	CLT; 16	DOV; 25	KEN; 30	MLW; 26	GLN; 21	CHI; 1	GTY; 14	PPR; 7	IRP; 15	MCH; 4	BRI; 12	DAR; 16	RCH; 19	DOV; 33	KAN; 6	CLT; 22	MEM; 14	PHO; 21	CAR; 23	HOM; 7		8th	3871	
2002	Andy Houston	92	Chevy	DAY; 9	CAR; 17	LVS; 24																																14th	3737	
2002	Todd Bodine	92	Chevy				DAR; 8	BRI; 8	TEX; 30	NSH; 18	TAL; 4	CAL; 22	RCH; 40	NHA; 2	NZH; 23	CLT; 5	DOV; 12	NSH; 11	KEN; 1	MLW; 26	DAY; 27	CHI; 2	GTY; 32	PPR; 37	IRP; 12	MCH; 4	BRI; 16	DAR; 17	RCH; 13	DOV; 43	KAN; 32				CAR; 12	PHO; 34	HOM; 39	14th	3737	
2002	Tim Fedewa	92	Chevy																													CLT; 12	MEM; 20	ATL; 26				14th	3737	
2003	Todd Bodine	92	Chevy	DAY; 6	CAR; 3	LVS; 19	DAR; 1*	BRI; 9	TEX; 4	TAL; 27	NSH; 13	CAL; 5	RCH; 29	GTY; 11	NZH; 5	CLT; 4	DOV; 7	NSH; 26	KEN; 29	MLW; 8	DAY; 8	CHI	NHA	PPR	IRP	MCH	BRI	DAR	RCH	DOV								22nd	2527	
2003	Jeff Green	92	Chevy																												KAN; 11	CLT	MEM	ATL	PHO	CAR	HOM; 27	22nd	2527	
