= 2001 Dura Lube 400 =

Second race of the 2001 NASCAR Winston Cup Series

Race details
- Race 2 of 36 in the 2001 NASCAR Winston Cup Series
- 2001 Dura Lube 400 program cover, featuring a tribute to Dale Earnhardt Sr. and Bobby Labonte
- Date: February 25–26, 2001
- Location: North Carolina Speedway, Richmond County, North Carolina
- Course: Permanent racing facility
- Course length: 1.017 miles (1.637 km)
- Distance: 393 laps, 399.681 mi (643.224 km)
- Weather: Temperatures reaching up to 71.6 °F (22.0 °C); wind speeds up to 14 miles per hour (23 km/h)
- Average speed: 111.877 mph

Pole position
Driver	Jeff Gordon	Hendrick Motorsports
- Time: 23.401

Most laps led
Driver	Jeff Gordon	Hendrick Motorsports
- Laps: 180

Winner
No. 1	Steve Park	Dale Earnhardt, Inc.

Television in the United States
- Network: Fox/FX
- Announcers: Mike Joy, Darrell Waltrip, Larry McReynolds
- Nielsen ratings: 7.0/10

The 2001 Dura Lube 400 was the second stock car race of the 2001 NASCAR Winston Cup Series. It was held on February 25, 2001 but ended on February 26 due to a rain delay at North Carolina Speedway, in Richmond County, North Carolina and was the first race to take place after the death of seven-time Winston Cup champion Dale Earnhardt on the last lap of the Daytona 500, and he was commemorated in various ways throughout the race weekend.

The race was delayed for more than 90 minutes before only completing 52 laps when it was stopped due to rain falling on the race track. The race restarted the next day under sunny conditions. The race was won by Steve Park in the No. 1 Chevrolet for Dale Earnhardt, Inc.; this was DEI's first win after Earnhardt's death in the previous race. This was also Kevin Harvick's debut in the Cup Series, as he replaced Earnhardt in the renumbered No. 29 Chevrolet for Richard Childress Racing.

== Qualifying ==
Pos.	Car	Driver	Manufacturer	Time	Avg. Speed (mph)
1	24	Jeff Gordon	Chevrolet	23.401	156.455
2	1	Steve Park	Chevrolet	23.410	156.395
3	18	Bobby Labonte	Pontiac	23.459	156.068
4	28	Ricky Rudd	Ford	23.484	155.902
5	99	Jeff Burton	Ford	23.534	155.571
6	20	Tony Stewart	Pontiac	23.550	155.465
7	15	Michael Waltrip	Chevrolet	23.563	155.379
8	10	Johnny Benson Jr.	Pontiac	23.584	155.241
9	97	Kurt Busch	Ford	23.600	155.136
10	11	Brett Bodine	Ford	23.612	155.057
11	22	Ward Burton	Dodge	23.623	154.985
12	25	Jerry Nadeau	Chevrolet	23.633	154.919
13	12	Jeremy Mayfield	Ford	23.637	154.893
14	9	Bill Elliott	Dodge	23.655	154.775
15	36	Ken Schrader	Pontiac	23.705	154.448
16	93	Dave Blaney	Dodge	23.705	154.448
17	6	Mark Martin	Ford	23.721	154.344
18	88	Dale Jarrett	Ford	23.729	154.292
19	43	John Andretti	Dodge	23.734	154.260
20	01	Jason Leffler	Dodge	23.738	154.234
21	55	Bobby Hamilton	Chevrolet	23.742	154.208
22	21	Elliott Sadler	Ford	23.750	154.156
23	19	Casey Atwood	Dodge	23.766	154.052
24	4	Robby Gordon	Chevrolet	23.770	154.026
25	8	Dale Earnhardt Jr.	Chevrolet	23.777	153.981
26	40	Sterling Marlin	Dodge	23.779	153.968
27	33	Joe Nemechek	Chevrolet	23.782	153.948
28	14	Ron Hornaday Jr.	Pontiac	23.799	153.838
29	50	Rick Mast	Chevrolet	23.805	153.800
30	27	Kenny Wallace	Pontiac	23.810	153.767
31	77	Robert Pressley	Ford	23.811	153.761
32	26	Jimmy Spencer	Ford	23.860	153.445
33	2	Rusty Wallace	Ford	23.868	153.394
34	7	Mike Wallace	Ford	23.873	153.362
35	5	Terry Labonte	Chevrolet	23.876	153.342
36	29	Kevin Harvick	Chevrolet	23.892	153.240
Provisionals
37	31	Mike Skinner	Chevrolet	24.034	152.334
38	17	Matt Kenseth	Ford	23.928	153.009
39	66	Todd Bodine	Ford	24.001	152.544
40	92	Stacy Compton	Dodge	23.968	152.754
41	32	Ricky Craven	Ford	23.992	152.601
42	44	Buckshot Jones	Dodge	23.976	152.703
43	90	Hut Stricklin	Ford	24.089	151.986
Failed to qualify
44	96	Andy Houston	Ford	23.909	153.009
45	45	Kyle Petty	Dodge	23.970	152.741
WD	60	Joe Bessey	Chevrolet	0.000	0.000
WD	85	Carl Long	Ford	0.000	0.000

== Race recap ==
=== Pre-race ceremonies ===
Before the start, the race was delayed for 1 hour and 33 minutes. During this time, Darrell Waltrip led an invocation that commemorated Dale Earnhardt. Waltrip asked for all spectators to hold the hand of the person that sat next to them to bond and remember Earnhardt. Waltrip also performed a prayer asking for strength, pray for the Earnhardt family and asked for sadness to be turned for celebration towards Earnhardt's life. The invocation was joined by Staff Sgt. Joseph Hunter of Seymour Johnson Air Force Base who performed the national anthem which was to have been followed by three F-15 Strike Eagles from the 333rd Fighter Squadron of Seymour Johnson AFB that would have performed the missing man formation over the racetrack with the No. 3 missing man aircraft absent from the proceedings. This did not occur due to heavy cloud cover. During the national anthem, the three crews from Dale Earnhardt, Inc. stood atop their pit walls and raised their caps in the air and this continued when the drivers entered their cars. The pole position was left open during the parade lap in tribute to Earnhardt.

=== Race ===
On the first lap, Dale Earnhardt Jr. was bumped from behind by Ron Hornaday Jr. heading into turn 3 and sent it into Kenny Wallace's path, crashing at 150 mph at an angle with Earnhardt Jr. suffering bruising and a limp in his leg. Other cars involved were Jimmy Spencer, Mike Wallace and Hut Stricklin. Despite this, Earnhardt Jr. was taken by an ambulance to the medical center.

On lap 44, Park passed Gordon for the lead. Two laps later, the yellow flag was waved when rain started to fall on the track. The race was eventually stopped with Stacy Compton leading when everyone made their scheduled pit stops. The race was red flagged, and eventually postponed to Monday, February 26 at 11 am Eastern Standard Time. The next day, the race restarted on lap 56, and Gordon took the lead from Compton, who did not make a pit stop before the red flag, and led 18 laps before Park took over the top spot. The race went 188 laps green until Mike Skinner spun out on the backstretch, bringing out the third caution of the event. The race restarted once more, and went 52 more laps before the fourth and final caution came out for oil on the track. The race restarted with 85 laps to go. Gordon led the next thirty, before Park took the lead. With less than 10 laps to go, Bobby Labonte was closing in on Park. Park held off Labonte for his second and to date, most recent Cup win.

=== Post-race ===
After crossing the finishing line, Park raised a No. 3 Earnhardt hat that hung on his gearshift lever and thrust it out of the car to holding it high in tribute to Earnhardt. Park also performed a spin, drove towards Michael Waltrip and made a brief stop with the exchanging a high-five. As Park celebrated, he received a call from Earnhardt's wife Teresa Earnhardt who watched the race at the Dale Earnhardt, Inc. shop in Mooresville, North Carolina. According to Park, Teresa was emotional, but happy. The race took three hours, thirty-four minutes and twenty-one seconds to complete, and the margin of victory was 0.138 seconds.

== Race results ==
Pos.	#	Driver	Make	Team	Laps	Led	Status	Points
1	1	Steve Park	Chevrolet	Dale Earnhardt, Inc.	393	167	running	180/5
2	18	Bobby Labonte	Pontiac	Joe Gibbs Racing	393	32	running	175/5
3	24	Jeff Gordon	Chevrolet	Hendrick Motorsports	393	180	running	175/10
4	20	Tony Stewart	Pontiac	Joe Gibbs Racing	393	0	running	160
5	32	Ricky Craven	Ford	PPI Motorsports	393	0	running	155
6	10	Johnny Benson Jr.	Pontiac	MBV Motorsports	393	0	running	150
7	2	Rusty Wallace	Ford	Penske Racing South	393	0	running	146
8	40	Sterling Marlin	Dodge	Chip Ganassi Racing	393	1	running	147
9	93	Dave Blaney	Dodge	Bill Davis Racing	393	0	running	138
10	88	Dale Jarrett	Ford	Robert Yates Racing	393	0	running	134
11	21	Elliott Sadler	Ford	Wood Brothers Racing	393	0	running	130
12	77	Robert Pressley	Ford	Jasper Motorsports	393	0	running	127
13	55	Bobby Hamilton	Chevrolet	Andy Petree Racing	393	0	running	124
14	29	Kevin Harvick	Chevrolet	Richard Childress Racing	392	0	running	121
15	25	Jerry Nadeau	Chevrolet	Hendrick Motorsports	392	0	running	118
16	22	Ward Burton	Dodge	Bill Davis Racing	392	0	running	115
17	33	Joe Nemechek	Chevrolet	Andy Petree Racing	392	0	running	112
18	19	Casey Atwood	Dodge	Evernham Motorsports	392	0	running	109
19	15	Michael Waltrip	Chevrolet	Dale Earnhardt, Inc.	392	1	running	111
20	6	Mark Martin	Ford	Roush Racing	392	1	running	108
21	43	John Andretti	Dodge	Petty Enterprises	391	0	running	100
22	36	Ken Schrader	Pontiac	MBV Motorsports	391	0	running	97
23	9	Bill Elliott	Dodge	Evernham Motorsports	391	0	running	94
24	31	Mike Skinner	Chevrolet	Richard Childress Racing	391	0	running	91
25	14	Ron Hornaday Jr.	Pontiac	A.J. Foyt Racing	390	0	running	88
26	4	Robby Gordon	Chevrolet	Morgan-McClure Motorsports	390	0	running	85
27	11	Brett Bodine	Ford	Brett Bodine Racing	390	0	running	82
28	17	Matt Kenseth	Ford	Roush Racing	389	0	running	79
29	5	Terry Labonte	Chevrolet	Hendrick Motorsports	389	0	running	76
30	26	Jimmy Spencer	Ford	Haas-Carter Motorsports	389	1	running	78
31	90	Hut Stricklin	Ford	Donlavey Racing	389	0	running	70
32	50	Rick Mast	Chevrolet	Midwest Transit Racing	388	0	running	67
33	01	Jason Leffler	Dodge	Chip Ganassi Racing	387	0	running	64
34	66	Todd Bodine	Ford	Haas-Carter Motorsports	387	0	running	61
35	44	Buckshot Jones	Dodge	Petty Enterprises	383	1	running	63
36	97	Kurt Busch	Ford	Roush Racing	383	0	running	55
37	99	Jeff Burton	Ford	Roush Racing	379	0	running	52
38	12	Jeremy Mayfield	Ford	Penske Racing South	364	0	running	49
39	28	Ricky Rudd	Ford	Robert Yates Racing	355	3	running	51
40	7	Mike Wallace	Ford	Ultra Motorsports	355	0	running	43
41	92	Stacy Compton	Dodge	Melling Racing	295	6	engine	45
42	27	Kenny Wallace	Pontiac	Eel River Racing	118	0	crash	37
43	8	Dale Earnhardt Jr.	Chevrolet	Dale Earnhardt, Inc.	0	0	crash	34

== Standings after the race ==
	Pos	Driver	Points
2	1	Rusty Wallace	311
4	2	Sterling Marlin	298 (–13)
2	3	Michael Waltrip	291 (–20)
4	4	Bobby Hamilton	266 (–45)
26	5	Steve Park	255 (–56)
1	6	Bill Elliott	254 (–57)
22	7	Jeff Gordon	253 (–58)
15	8	Ricky Craven	249 (–62)
6	9	Robert Pressley	248 (–63)
2	10	Joe Nemechek	242 (–69)

Previous race: 2001 Daytona 500	Winston Cup Series; 2001 season	Next race: 2001 UAW-DaimlerChrysler 400
