= Todd Bodine =

American racing driver (born 1964)

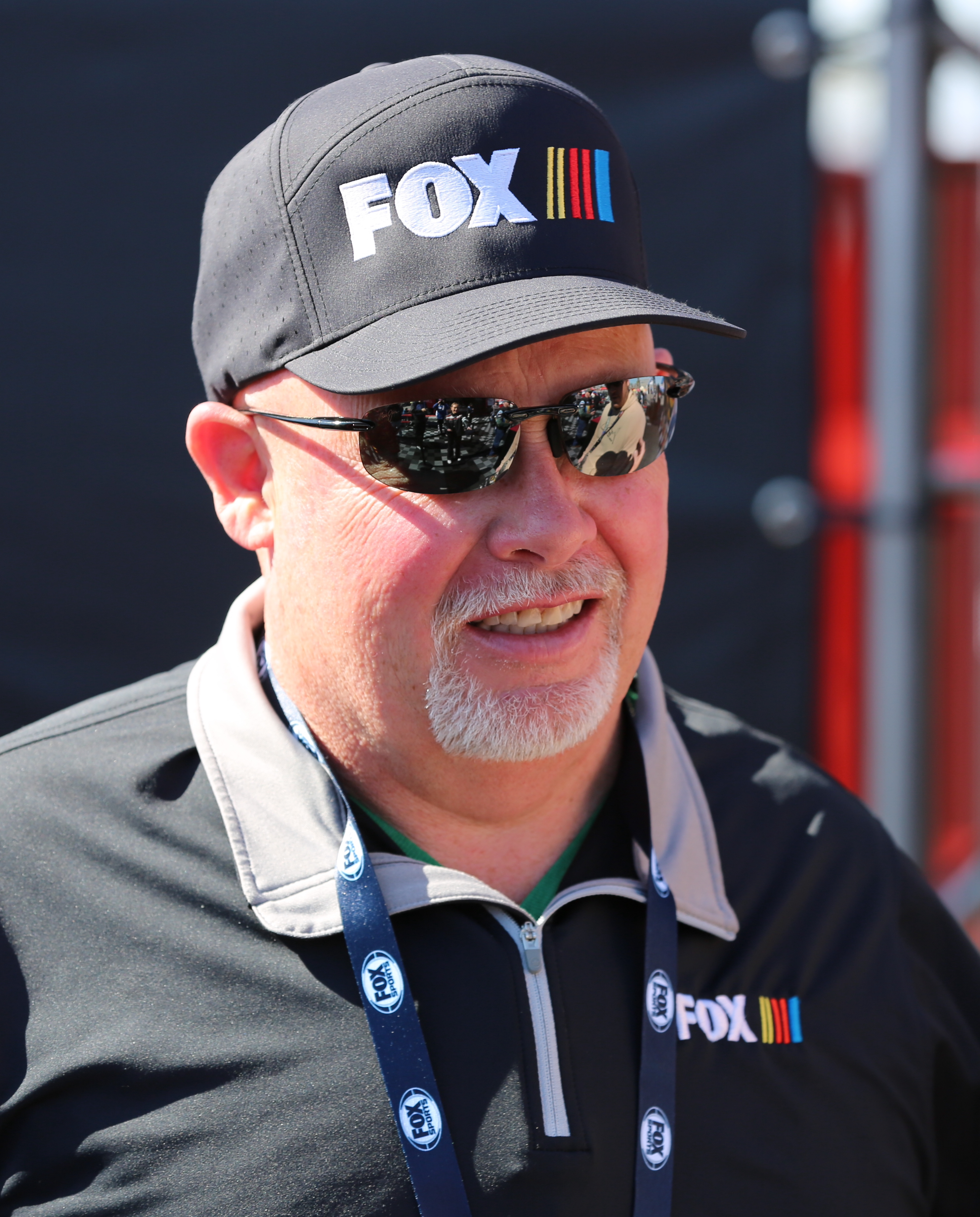
- Bodine at Las Vegas Motor Speedway in 2025
- Born: Todd Martin Bodine; February 27, 1964 (age 62); Chemung, New York, U.S.
- Achievements: 2006, 2010 NASCAR Camping World Truck Series Champion

NASCAR Cup Series career
- 241 races run over 18 years
- 2011 position: 75th
- Best finish: 20th (1994)
- First race: 1992 Budweiser at the Glen (Watkins Glen)
- Last race: 2011 Pure Michigan 400 (Michigan)
Wins	Top tens	Poles
0	21	5

NASCAR O'Reilly Auto Parts Series career
- 333 races run over 25 years
- 2017 position: 74th
- Best finish: 2nd (1997)
- First race: 1986 Nationwise 150 (Martinsville)
- Last race: 2017 Hisense 4K TV 300 (Charlotte)
- First win: 1991 Budweiser 200 (Dover)
- Last win: 2003 Darlingtonraceway.com 200 (Darlington)
Wins	Top tens	Poles
15	160	7

NASCAR FedEx Freight Truck Series career
- 226 races run over 12 years
- 2022 position: 36th
- Best finish: 1st (2006, 2010)
- First race: 1995 Heartland Tailgate 175 (Topeka)
- Last race: 2022 CRC Brakleen 150 (Pocono)
- First win: 2004 American Racing Wheels 200 (California)
- Last win: 2012 Lucas Oil 200 (Dover)
Wins	Top tens	Poles
22	125	7

ARCA Menards Series career
- 1 race run over 1 year
- Best finish: 189th (2004)
- First race: 2004 PFG Lester 150 (Nashville)
Wins	Top tens	Poles
0	0	0
- Statistics up to date as of November 5, 2022.

Todd Martin Bodine (born February 27, 1964) is an American former professional stock car racing driver. He last competed part-time in the NASCAR Camping World Truck Series, driving the No. 62 Toyota Tundra for Halmar Friesen Racing, and is currently a racing analyst for Fox NASCAR. Todd is the younger brother of former racers Geoffrey and Brett Bodine. Bodine is known for his bald head, which has given him the nickname "the Onion".

== NASCAR career ==
Bodine would make his NASCAR Busch Series debut in 1986, for Pistone Racing at Martinsville. He qualified and finished 27th in the 30-car field, falling out of the race early with an engine problem.

=== 1990s ===
Bodine went on a three-year hiatus from the series until 1990, when he would drive eight races for the Highline Racing #42/#81 Ames Pontiac, making his season debut at Martinsville. He started 11th and finished 8th. He then followed that up with finishes of 7th at Orange County and 3rd at Dover Downs.

In 1991, Bodine signed to drive for Frank Cicci. In his first full season in the series, he won his first career race, one of 15 Top 10s in 1991. Bodine also won his first two poles which came "back to back" at Dublin and South Boston. He ended the year 7th in points.

Bodine's career in Cup started at Watkins Glen International Raceway on August 9, 1992 when he was 28 years old. He raced the No. 34 Diet Pepsi Ford Thunderbird for Cicci-Welliver Racing, finishing 37th. It was revealed in 2022 in The Scene Vault Podcast, that though the listed owner was Cicci-Welliver, the car was in fact owned by, and the team of, Junie Donlavey of Donlavey Racing. They re-numbered Junie's car as a team "rental" to further the attention of Bodine's Busch Series team. Bodine revealed in the podcast that the technicality of the listed car owner was disappointing after Donlavey's death in 2014, as Todd was not listed as one of "Junie's Army", or Junie's many Cup Series drivers, as the two were friends. His first full-time season came in 1994 when he raced for Butch Mock Motorsports. He raced the No. 75 Ford Thunderbird sponsored by Factory Stores. He missed one race the whole season and scored two Top 5's and seven Top 10's on his way to 20th-place finish in the points standings. He was unable to match those statistics in 1995 as he finished 33rd in the points with only one Top 5 top-five and three Top 10's. Following his release from Butch Mock, Bodine spent 1996, filling in for Bill Elliott in a four-race span, finishing 10th at Pocono. He also drove three races apiece for David Blair Motorsports and Andy Petree Racing. He also returned to the Busch Series full-time, driving for ProTech Motorsports in their No. 81 and No. 82 Chevrolet, winning at South Boston en route to a 3rd-place points finish. In 1997, he filled in for Ricky Craven at Hendrick Motorsports at Texas and for his brother, Geoff at Charlotte Motor Speedway, before he won the pole at Watkins Glen for Cicci-Welliver in a one-race deal. He finished 35th due to engine problems in that race. Todd started races for five different teams in 1997. At Loudon, he relieved Jeff Burton, who had an inner ear problem, and exited his Roush Racing car after 68 laps. Todd again ran full-time in the Busch Series, this time returning to Team 34 in their No. 36 Pontiac. He won at Fontana en route to a 2nd-place points finish, his best points finish in his Busch Series career.

For 1998, Bodine signed with a new team called ISM Racing. The team struggled and he was temporarily replaced by Loy Allen Jr. for the Pepsi 400 in July, then after the race was delayed to October was fired by the team before the next race at New Hampshire International Speedway. He went back to Cicci-Welliver in the Busch Series, replacing rookie Mike Cope in the No. 30 Slim Jim car. He finished 33rd in points despite running 13 races and posted a string of five consecutive Top 5 finishes. He also ran part-time in cup for LJ Racing, posting a 5th at Atlanta.

In 1999, Bodine's Cicci-Welliver team signed Phillips 66 as the sponsor, as well as switching to No. 66, and he posted ten Top 5's en route to a 4th-place points finish. In addition, he ran seven races for Eel River Racing at the Cup level, his best finish being 15th at Bristol. In 2000, he won a pole at Talladega as well as the race at Michigan.

=== 2000–2004 ===
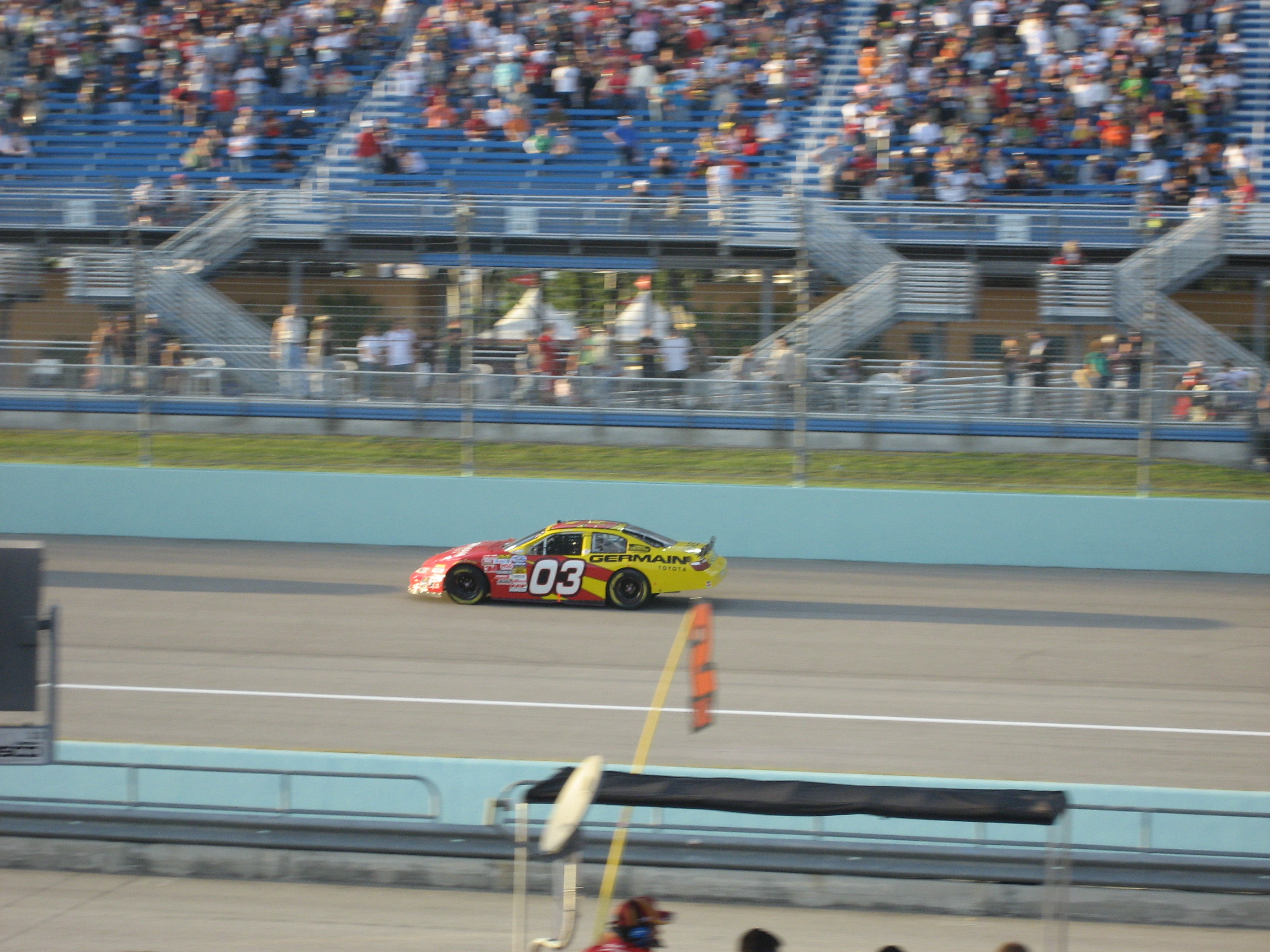
Bodine at the Ford 300 during the 2007 Ford Championship Weekend at Homestead-Miami Speedway.

Bodine would get back into Cup racing full-time in 2001 while racing the No. 66 K-Mart Ford Taurus owned by Haas-Carter Motorsports. Despite getting three poles, he only scored two Top 5's, missed the Daytona 500, and was plagued with twelve DNFs, causing him to finish 29th in points. He also won the exhibition No-Bull Sprint, which put him into the Winston at Lowe's Motor Speedway. He also ran half the schedule in the Busch Series, winning two of the first three races of the season with Buckshot Racing, before ending the season driving for Fitz Motorsports. He started 2002 with the No. 66, but lost his ride after Kmart filed for bankruptcy. He signed on to Herzog Motorsports replacing Andy Houston after Andy was released due to "performance issues". Bodine won the Kroger 300 at Kentucky, finishing 23rd in points. During the season, he rejoined Haas-Carter when Discover Card became the team's primary sponsor. He garnered a 5th-place run at Richmond, and finished 38th in points. In 2003, Carter partnered with Sam Belnavis to field the No. 54 United States National Guard Ford for Bodine. Bodine's best finish that year was an 8th at Pocono and he finished 31st in standings. After that year, Belnavis abandoned the operation and took sponsors National Guard and Subway to Roush Racing and the Carter team closed its doors due to the lack of sponsorship. Bodine also got a win at Darlington in the Busch Series for Herzog and led the Busch Series points standings but again a lack of sponsorship forced his team to close. He ended the season at Innovative Motorsports. He split 2004 between Mach 1 Racing, Arnold Motorsports, and R&J Racing, his best finish a 23rd at Bristol. He ran five Busch races for GIC-Mixon Motorsports and Marsh Racing, finishing 5th at Homestead.

=== Truck Series ===
Bodine made his Craftsman Truck Series debut in 1995 driving for Roush Racing's No. 61 Ford for five races. In his debut, Bodine qualified 3rd on the road course at Heartland Park Topeka, and finished 4th. His worst finish was at Mesa Marin Raceway, where he finished 8th, earned his best start of 2nd, and led his first career lap.

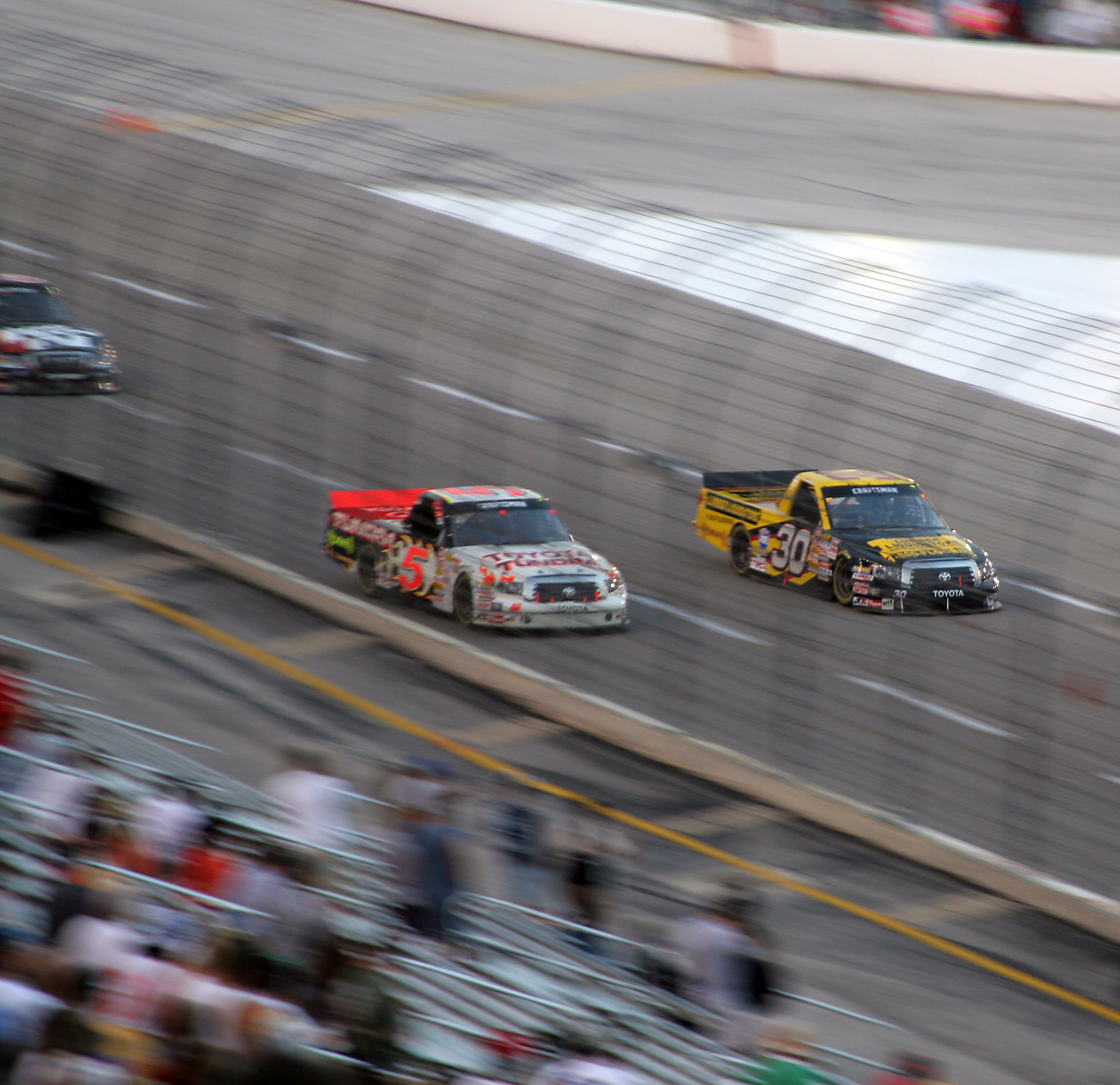
Bodine (#30) battling with Mike Skinner at TMS in 2007.

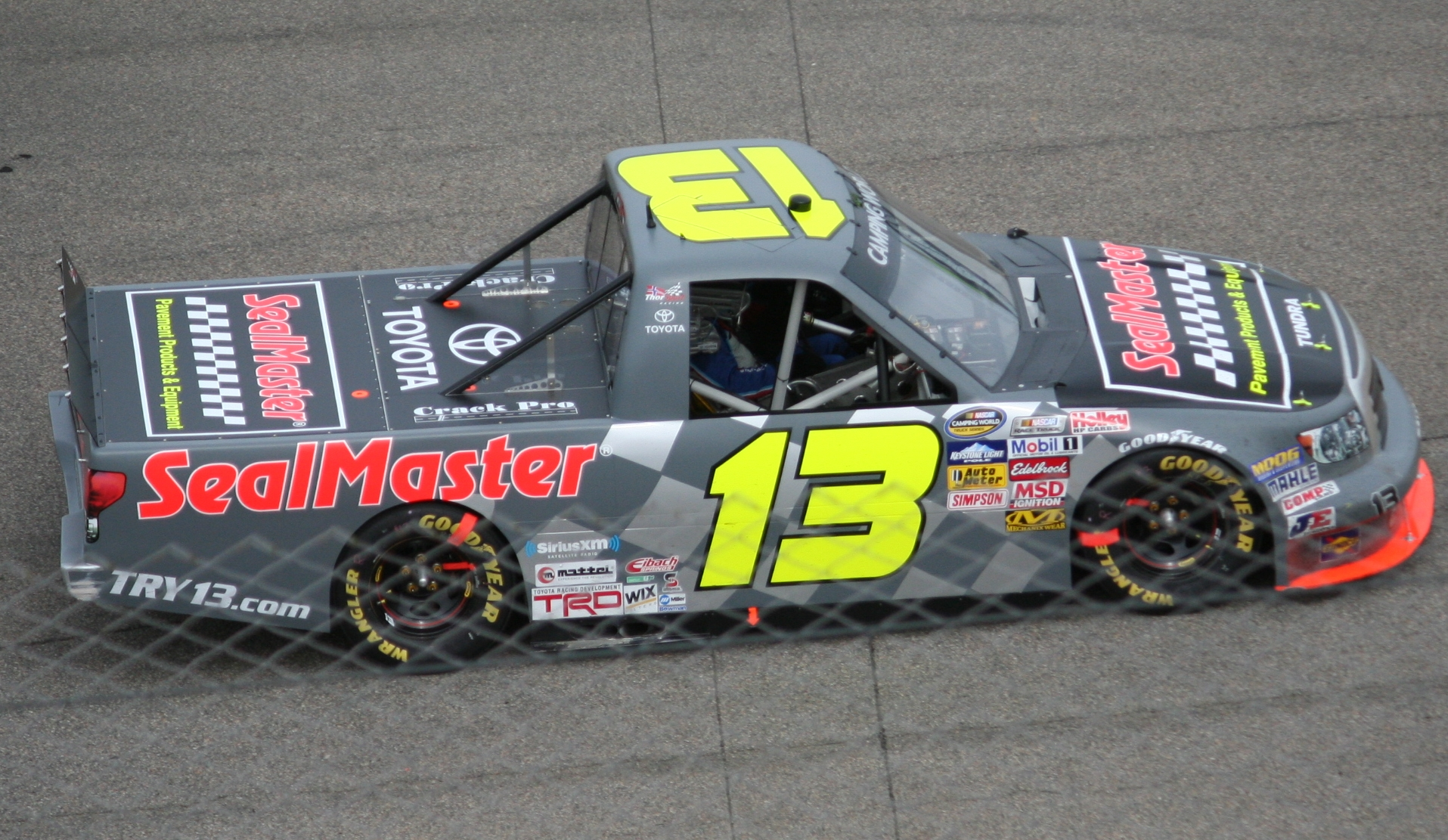
Bodine's 2013 truck at Rockingham Speedway

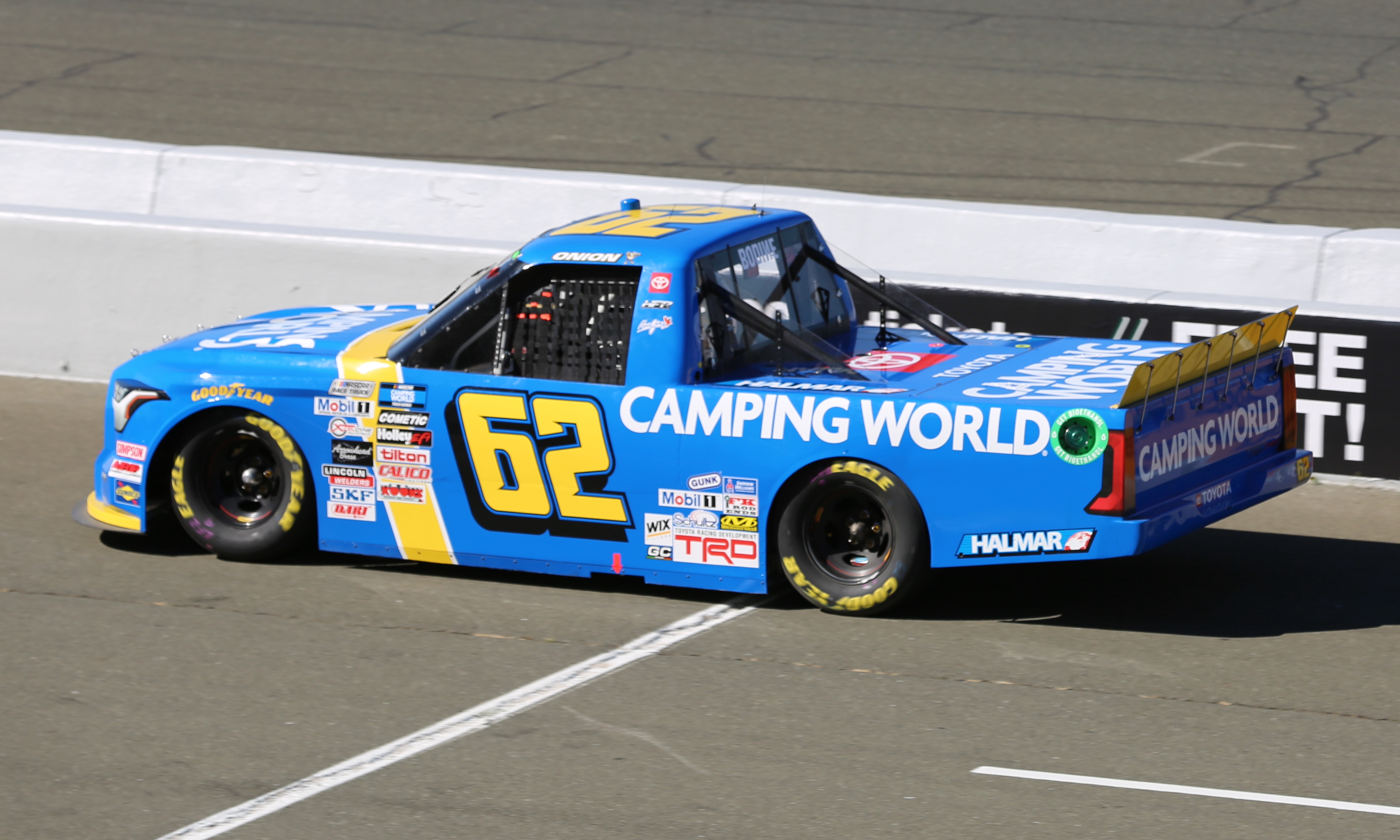
Bodine's 2022 truck at Sonoma Raceway

Bodine did not run the Trucks again until 2004, when he competed for Fiddleback Racing at Charlotte, finishing 20th and also ran for HT Motorsports's No. 59 Dodge at Kansas, scoring a 15th-place finish. Later, he signed with the new Germain-Arnold Racing team, finishing 4th in their debut at Richmond. After losing in Vegas to Shane Hmiel, Bodine won his first two career races back-to-back at Fontana and Texas. Competing in ten events, Bodine averaged a 13th-place finish in his events, despite falling out of three with mechanical issues. Neither Bodine nor crew chief Mike Hillman Jr. was happy with contract issues and the team leadership. So Bodine parted ways with the team and went back to Fiddleback Racing, where he would drive in 2005. Bodine was able to earn four Top 10's with the team in ten starts, but inconsistency was weighing him down to 8th-place in points. Fiddleback also had no funding and after a 9th-place at Michigan the team was disbanded.

Germain-Arnold signed to have Bodine come back. He won in his second race with the team at Kansas and rolled to four more victories, including three straight at the end of the season. By winning the final three races of the season, he made a serious run for the title. With four races remaining in the season Todd was 4th in the standings, 256 points behind leader Ted Musgrave. With Bodine's three wins, he was able to gain one spot to 3rd and an entire 183 points on Musgrave to finish only 73 points behind.

In 2006, Bodine was once again behind the wheel of the No. 30 Lumber Liquidators Toyota. Bodine won at Atlanta, Gateway, and Texas. Bodine won the 2006 Craftsman Truck Series championship on November 17, 2006, by 122 points over Johnny Benson Jr, with three wins, twelve Top 5's, sixteen Top 10's, a pole at Atlanta, an average finish of 8.4, and zero DNFs; it was Bodine's and Toyota's first-ever championship in any division. Starting in 2009 Lumber Liquidators left the No. 30 truck, while Copart came along to become the sponsor for the season, while still driving for Germain Racing.

In 2010, Bodine stayed consistent all season long to capture the championship title. Driving for Germain Racing, Bodine won four races, and picked up seventeen Top 5's and twenty Top 10's along with two poles at Nashville and Chicagoland, and an average finish of 6.4. The consistency had caused him to clinch the championship with one race to go in the season.

For 2011, Bodine struggled with consistency, as he suffered bad luck in most of the first ten races. In spite of the team's success, sponsorship had been a constant issue for the No. 30 team since as far back as 2005; in 2011, they managed to run ten races with limited sponsorship. However, after Kentucky, Germain was unable to send the 30 team to Iowa without a sponsor. The week before the race at Iowa, Germain partnered with Randy Moss Motorsports to put Bodine in their No. 5 truck for the rest of 2011. Although his results improved in the No. 5 team, Bodine went winless in 2011 (his best finish being a third at Bristol) and subsequently left Germain when the team decided to put its focus on the Sprint Cup Series.

In 2012, Bodine was picked up by Red Horse Racing to run a full schedule. Bodine would run subsequent races with ToyotaCare sponsorship, and won the sixth race of the season, at Dover International Speedway, in a rain-shortened event.

Bodine started the 2013 season driving for ThorSport Racing at Daytona International Speedway, finishing 11th. He followed it up with another eleventh in the following race at Martinsville Speedway and ran the next six races for ThorSport before departing from the team following the race at Texas Motor Speedway. Four weeks later, he made what would be his last start for nine years in the Camping World Truck Series at Pocono, driving the No. 30 truck for Turner Scott Motorsports. He finished 11th.

Bodine ran a total of eight Nationwide Series races from 2014 to 2017 for SS-Green Light Racing and DGM Racing, his best finish being a 19th at Watkins Glen International in 2015. He ran his final race at Charlotte Motor Speedway in 2017 and finished 30th. After five seasons away from the track, 2022 saw an offer from Camping World CEO Marcus Lemonis to sponsor Bodine for six races in the truck series to get Bodine to eight-hundred overall starts in NASCAR. Bodine was confirmed to make a return to the Camping World Truck Series for six races. He drove for Halmar Friesen Racing in the No. 62 Toyota Tundra. Bodine's first attempt was at Las Vegas. Bodine has said that this would serve as his farewell tour, known as "The Onion's Last Ride". In July, Bodine achieved his eight-hundredth career start across NASCAR's top three series when he raced in the CRC Brakleen 150 at Pocono Raceway.

== Broadcasting career ==
Bodine currently works on Fox Sports 1 as a color analyst for select Craftsman Truck Series races when Michael Waltrip is unavailable. He also works as a pit reporter for the series.

== Motorsports career results ==
=== Racing career summary ===
Season	Series	Team	Races	Wins	Top 5	Top 10	Points	Position
1986	NASCAR Busch Series	Pistone Racing	1	0	0	0	82	85th
1990	NASCAR Busch Series	Highline Racing	8	0	1	3	772	39th
1991	NASCAR Busch Series	Team 34	31	1	7	15	3825	7th
1992	NASCAR Busch Series	Team 34	31	3	11	19	4212	**3rd**
1992	NASCAR Winston Cup Series	Team 34	1	0	0	0	52	87th
1993	NASCAR Busch Series	Team 34	28	3	9	13	3387	9th
1993	NASCAR Winston Cup Series	Butch Mock Motorsports	10	0	0	0	715	40th
1994	NASCAR Busch Series	Ernie Irvan Racing	1	0	0	0	31	105th
1994	NASCAR Winston Cup Series	Butch Mock Motorsports	31	0	2	7	3048	20th
1995	NASCAR SuperTruck Series	Roush Racing	5	0	1	5	748	32nd
1995	NASCAR Busch Series	Group III Racing	1	0	0	0	314	58th
1995	NASCAR Busch Series	Parker Racing	2	1	1	1	314	58th
1995	NASCAR Winston Cup Series	Butch Mock Motorsports	28	0	1	3	2372	33rd
1996	NASCAR Busch Series	Pro Tech Motorsports	26	1	3	9	3064	**3rd**
1996	NASCAR Winston Cup Series	Elliott-Hardy Racing	4	0	0	1	991	40th
1996	NASCAR Winston Cup Series	David Blair Motorsports	3	0	0	0	991	40th
1996	NASCAR Winston Cup Series	Andy Petree Racing	3	0	0	0	991	40th
1997	NASCAR Busch Series	Team 34	30	1	9	22	4115	**2nd**
1997	NASCAR Winston Cup Series	Team 34	1	0	0	0	310	52nd
1997	NASCAR Winston Cup Series	Hendrick Motorsports	1	0	0	0	310	52nd
1997	NASCAR Winston Cup Series	Geoff Bodine Racing	1	0	0	0	310	52nd
1997	NASCAR Winston Cup Series	American Equipment Racing	1	0	0	0	310	52nd
1997	NASCAR Winston Cup Series	ISM Racing	1	0	0	0	310	52nd
1998	NASCAR Busch Series	Team 34	13	0	5	7	1668	33rd
1998	NASCAR Winston Cup Series	ISM Racing	7	0	0	1	1322	41st
1998	NASCAR Winston Cup Series	LJ Racing	7	0	1	1	1322	41st
1999	NASCAR Busch Series	Cicci-Welliver Racing	32	0	10	21	4029	4th
1999	NASCAR Winston Cup Series	Eel River Racing	7	0	0	0	529	46th
2000	NASCAR Busch Series	Cicci-Welliver Racing	32	1	14	19	4075	4th
2000	NASCAR Winston Cup Series	Cicci-Welliver Racing	1	0	0	0	456	49th
2000	NASCAR Winston Cup Series	LJ Racing	2	0	0	1	456	49th
2000	NASCAR Winston Cup Series	Hendrick Motorsports	1	0	0	0	456	49th
2000	NASCAR Winston Cup Series	Haas-Carter Motorsports	1	0	0	0	456	49th
2001	NASCAR Busch Series	Buckshot Racing	12	2	5	6	1915	29th
2001	NASCAR Busch Series	HighLine Performance Group	4	0	1	1	1915	29th
2001	NASCAR Winston Cup Series	Haas-Carter Motorsports	35	0	2	2	2960	29th
2002	NASCAR Busch Series	Herzog-Jackson Motorsports	27	1	6	8	3071	23rd
2002	NASCAR Winston Cup Series	Haas-Carter Motorsports	24	0	1	4	1987	38th
2003	NASCAR Busch Series	Herzog-Jackson Motorsports	18	1	6	11	2763	17th
2003	NASCAR Busch Series	Evans Motorsports	1	0	0	0	2763	17th
2003	NASCAR Busch Series	Innovative Motorsports	3	0	0	0	2763	17th
2003	NASCAR Winston Cup Series	BelCar Racing	35	0	0	1	2976	31st
2004	ARCA Re/Max Series	Shaver Motorsports	1	0	0	0	30	189th
2004	NASCAR Busch North Series	Marsh Racing	1	0	0	0	127	45th
2004	NASCAR Busch Series	Marsh Racing	5	0	1	1	628	53rd
2004	NASCAR Busch Series	GIC-Mixon Motorsports	1	0	0	0	628	53rd
2004	NASCAR Craftsman Truck Series	Fiddle Back Racing	1	0	0	0	1317	27th
2004	NASCAR Craftsman Truck Series	HT Motorsports	1	0	0	0	1317	27th
2004	NASCAR Craftsman Truck Series	Germain-Arnold Racing	8	2	4	5	1317	27th
2004	NASCAR Nextel Cup Series	Mach 1 Racing	8	0	0	0	986	41st
2004	NASCAR Nextel Cup Series	R&J Racing	2	0	0	0	986	41st
2004	NASCAR Nextel Cup Series	Arnold Motorsports	11	0	0	0	986	41st
2005	NASCAR Whelen Modified Tour	N/A	1	0	0	0	0	83rd
2005	NASCAR Craftsman Truck Series	Fiddle Back Racing	10	0	2	4	3462	**3rd**
2005	NASCAR Craftsman Truck Series	Germain Racing	15	5	10	11	3462	**3rd**
2005	NASCAR Busch Series	Curb Agajanian Performance Group	0	0	0	0	341	80th
2005	NASCAR Busch Series	Frank Cicci Racing	5	0	0	0	341	80th
2005	NASCAR Nextel Cup Series	Morgan-McClure Motorsports	1	0	0	0	103	68th
2006	NASCAR Whelen Modified Tour	N/A	1	0	0	0	43	73rd
2006	NASCAR Craftsman Truck Series	Germain Racing	25	3	12	16	3666	**1st**
2006	NASCAR Busch Series	Frank Cicci Racing	2	0	0	0	107	111th
2006	NASCAR Nextel Cup Series	Morgan-McClure Motorsports	2	0	0	0	143	59th
2007	NASCAR Craftsman Truck Series	Germain Racing	25	2	10	16	3525	4th
2007	NASCAR Busch Series	Germain Racing	5	0	0	2	707	57th
2007	NASCAR Busch Series	Braun Racing	1	0	0	1	707	57th
2008	NASCAR Craftsman Truck Series	Germain Racing	25	3	15	17	3621	**3rd**
2008	NASCAR Nationwide Series	Germain Racing	1	0	1	1	246	84th
2008	NASCAR Nationwide Series	MSRP Motorsports	2	0	0	0	246	84th
2009	NASCAR Camping World Truck Series	Germain Racing	25	2	11	12	3432	4th
2009	NASCAR Sprint Cup Series	Gunselman Motorsports	3	0	0	0	123	58th
2010	NASCAR Camping World Truck Series	Germain Racing	25	4	17	20	3937	**1st**
2010	NASCAR Sprint Cup Series	Gunselman Motorsports	7	0	0	0	313	53rd
2011	NASCAR Camping World Truck Series	Randy Moss Motorsports	15	0	2	8	803	6th
2011	NASCAR Camping World Truck Series	Germain Racing	10	0	3	3	803	6th
2011	NASCAR Nationwide Series	Germain Racing	1	0	0	0	0	NC†
2011	NASCAR Sprint Cup Series	Germain Racing	1	0	0	0	0	NC†
2011	NASCAR Sprint Cup Series	HP Racing	2	0	0	0	0	NC†
2012	NASCAR Camping World Truck Series	Red Horse Racing	22	1	5	7	574	14th
2013	NASCAR Camping World Truck Series	ThorSport Racing	7	0	0	0	215	28th
2013	NASCAR Camping World Truck Series	Turner Scott Motorsports	1	0	0	0	215	28th
2014	NASCAR Nationwide Series	SS-Green Light Racing	2	0	0	0	0	NC†
2015	NASCAR Xfinity Series	SS-Green Light Racing	4	0	0	0	80	44th
2016	NASCAR Xfinity Series	SS-Green Light Racing	1	0	0	0	7	76th
2017	NASCAR Xfinity Series	SS-Green Light Racing	1	0	0	0	7	74th
2022	NASCAR Camping World Truck Series	Halmar-Friesen Racing	6	0	0	1	98	36th

^{†} As Bodine was a guest driver, he was ineligible for championship points.

=== NASCAR ===
(key) (Bold – Pole position awarded by qualifying time. Italics – Pole position earned by points standings or practice time. * – Most laps led.)

==== Sprint Cup Series ====
NASCAR Sprint Cup Series results
Year	Team	No.	Make	1	2	3	4	5	6	7	8	9	10	11	12	13	14	15	16	17	18	19	20	21	22	23	24	25	26	27	28	29	30	31	32	33	34	35	36	NSCC	Pts	Ref
1992	Team 34	34	Ford	DAY	CAR	RCH	ATL	DAR	BRI	NWS	MAR	TAL	CLT	DOV	SON	POC	MCH	DAY	POC	TAL	GLN; 37	MCH	BRI	DAR	RCH	DOV	MAR	NWS	CLT	CAR	PHO	ATL								87th	52	
1993	Butch Mock Motorsports	75	Ford	DAY	CAR	RCH	ATL	DAR	BRI	NWS	MAR	TAL	SON	CLT	DOV	POC	MCH	DAY	NHA	POC	TAL	GLN; 30	MCH; 40	BRI; DNQ	DAR; 27	RCH; 33	DOV; 35	MAR; 25	NWS; 23	CLT; 42	CAR; 25	PHO; 25	ATL; QL							40th	715	
1994	Butch Mock Motorsports	75	Ford	DAY; 36	CAR; 34	RCH; 25	ATL; 33	DAR; 22	BRI; 26	NWS; 19	MAR; 6	TAL; 28	SON; 38	CLT; 8	DOV; 16	POC; 14	MCH; 31	DAY; 7	NHA; 5	POC; 11	TAL; 16	IND; 9	GLN; 15	MCH; 38	BRI; 8	DAR; 26	RCH; 20	DOV; 16	MAR; 33	NWS; DNQ	CLT; 38	CAR; 21	PHO; 32	ATL; 3						20th	3048	
1995	Butch Mock Motorsports	75	Ford	DAY; 37	CAR; 31	RCH; 37	ATL; 21	DAR; 4	BRI; 33	NWS; 21	MAR; DNQ	TAL; 8	SON; 8	CLT; 38	DOV; 30	POC; 24	MCH; 29	DAY; 23	NHA; 36	POC; 23	TAL; 29	IND; 21	GLN; 32	MCH; 19	BRI; DNQ	DAR; 42	RCH; 24	DOV; 37	MAR; 24	NWS; DNQ	CLT; 26	CAR; 17	PHO; 25	ATL; 40						33rd	2372	
1996	Geoff Bodine Racing	7	Ford	DAY	CAR; QL^{†}	RCH	ATL	DAR	BRI	NWS	MAR	TAL	SON																											40th	991	
1996	Elliott-Hardy Racing	94	Ford											CLT; 36	DOV; 15	POC; 10	MCH; 20	DAY	NHA	POC	TAL	IND	GLN	MCH	BRI															40th	991	
1996	David Blair Motorsports	27	Ford																							DAR; 15	RCH; 34	DOV	MAR	NWS	CLT; 21									40th	991	
1996	Andy Petree Racing	33	Chevy																													CAR; 20	PHO; 11	ATL; 32						40th	991	
1997	Hendrick Motorsports	25	Chevy	DAY	CAR	RCH	ATL	DAR	TEX; 25	BRI	MAR	SON	TAL																											52nd	310	
1997	Geoff Bodine Racing	7	Ford											CLT; 42	DOV	POC	MCH	CAL	DAY	NHA	POC	IND																		52nd	310	
1997	Team 34	34	Chevy																				**GLN**; 35	MCH	BRI															52nd	310	
1997	American Equipment Racing	96	Chevy																							DAR; 42	RCH	NHA	DOV	MAR										52nd	310	
1997	ISM Racing	35	Pontiac																												CLT; 26	TAL	CAR	PHO	ATL; DNQ					52nd	310	
1998	ISM Racing	35	Pontiac	DAY; DNQ	CAR; DNQ	LVS; DNQ	ATL; 10	DAR; 27	BRI; 29	TEX; DNQ	MAR; 39	TAL; DNQ	CAL	CLT; 28	DOV; DNQ	RCH; 35	MCH; DNQ	POC; 22	SON; DNQ	NHA	POC	IND	GLN	MCH	BRI	NHA	DAR													41st	1322	
1998	LJ Racing	91	Chevy																									RCH; 32	DOV; 37	MAR; 12	CLT; 15	TAL	DAY	PHO; 15	CAR; 20	ATL; 5				41st	1322	
1999	Eel River Racing	30	Pontiac	DAY	CAR	LVS	ATL	DAR	TEX	BRI	MAR	TAL	CAL	RCH	CLT	DOV	MCH	POC	SON	DAY	NHA	POC	IND	GLN	MCH	BRI; 15	DAR; DNQ	RCH; 19	NHA; 39	DOV; DNQ	MAR	CLT; 36	TAL	CAR	PHO; 25	HOM; 27	ATL; 43			46th	529	
2000	LJ Racing	91	Chevy	DAY	CAR	LVS	ATL; 7	DAR	BRI	TEX; DNQ	MAR	TAL	CAL	RCH; 43	CLT	DOV	MCH	POC	SON	DAY	NHA	POC																		49th	456	
2000	Hendrick Motorsports	5	Chevy																				IND; 15																	49th	456	
2000	Cicci-Welliver Racing	34	Chevy																					GLN; 42	MCH															49th	456	
2000	Joe Bessey Motorsports	60	Chevy																							BRI; QL^{†}	DAR	RCH	NHA	DOV	MAR	CLT	TAL	CAR	PHO	HOM				49th	456	
2000	Haas-Carter Motorsports	46	Ford																																		ATL; 14			49th	456	
2001	Haas-Carter Motorsports	66	Ford	DAY; DNQ	CAR; 34	LVS; 5	ATL; 18	DAR; 33	BRI; 32	TEX; 35	MAR; 43	TAL; 41	CAL; 28	RCH; 30	CLT; 37	DOV; 15	MCH; 42	POC; 25	SON; 33	DAY; 12	**CHI**; 14	NHA; 15	**POC**; 43	IND; 24	GLN; 5	MCH; 23	BRI; 32	DAR; 40	RCH; 18	DOV; 15	KAN; 42	CLT; 17	**MAR**; 12	TAL; 41	PHO; 29	CAR; 41	HOM; 17	ATL; 16	NHA; 31	29th	2960	
2002	Haas-Carter Motorsports	66	Ford	DAY; 31	CAR; 32	**LVS**; 29	ATL	DAR	BRI	TEX	MAR	TAL	CAL	RCH	CLT																									38th	1987	
2002	Haas-Carter Motorsports	26	Ford													DOV; 18	POC; 18	MCH	SON; 26	DAY; 7	CHI; 26	NHA; 6	POC	IND; 34	GLN; 8	MCH; 26	BRI; 43	DAR; 33	RCH; 5	NHA; 42	DOV; 40	KAN; 34	TAL; 23	CLT; 37	MAR; 30	ATL; 41	CAR; 42	PHO; 22	HOM; INQ^{†}	38th	1987	
2003	BelCar Racing	54	Ford	DAY; 18	CAR; 42	LVS; 20	ATL; 28	DAR; 43	BRI; 40	TEX; 11	TAL; 28	MAR; 37	CAL; 25	RCH; 23	CLT; 23	DOV; 12	POC; 11	MCH; 37	SON; 23	DAY; 13	CHI; 33	NHA; 19	POC; 8	IND; 23	GLN; 35	MCH; 43	BRI; 37	DAR; 17	RCH; 42	NHA; 35	DOV; 17	TAL; DNQ	KAN; 11	CLT; 29	MAR; 40	ATL; 42	PHO; 22	CAR; 16	HOM; 11	31st	2976	
2004	Mach 1 Motorsports	98	Ford	DAY	CAR	LVS	ATL; 41	DAR; 40	BRI	TEX; 43	MAR; 39	TAL; DNQ	CAL; 34	RCH; 33							CHI; DNQ	NHA; 41	POC; 38																	41st	986	
2004	R&J Racing	37	Dodge												CLT; DNQ	DOV; DNQ	POC; 42	MCH; 36	SON	DAY																				41st	986	
2004	Arnold Motorsports	50	Dodge																					IND; 41	GLN; 41	MCH; 43	BRI; 23	CAL	RCH; 43	NHA; 23	DOV	TAL	KAN; 39	CLT	MAR; 43	ATL; 39	PHO; 43	DAR; 39	HOM; DNQ	41st	986	
2005	Morgan-McClure Motorsports	4	Chevy	DAY	CAL	LVS	ATL	BRI	MAR	TEX	PHO	TAL	DAR	RCH	CLT	DOV	POC	MCH	SON	DAY	CHI	NHA	POC	IND	GLN	MCH	BRI	CAL	RCH	NHA	DOV	TAL	KAN	CLT	MAR	ATL	TEX	PHO	HOM; 20	68th	103	
2006	Morgan-McClure Motorsports	4	Chevy	DAY	CAL	LVS	ATL	BRI	MAR	TEX	PHO	TAL	RCH	DAR	CLT	DOV	POC	MCH	SON	DAY	CHI	NHA	POC	IND	GLN	MCH	BRI	CAL	RCH	NHA	DOV	KAN	TAL; DNQ	CLT; 19	MAR	ATL; 42	TEX	PHO	HOM	59th	143	
2007	Morgan-McClure Motorsports	4	Chevy	DAY	CAL	LVS	ATL	BRI	MAR	TEX	PHO	TAL	RCH	DAR	CLT	DOV	POC	MCH	SON	NHA	DAY	CHI	IND	POC	GLN	MCH	BRI	CAL	RCH	NHA	DOV	KAN	TAL	CLT	MAR	ATL	TEX	PHO	HOM; DNQ	NA	-	
2009	Gunselman Motorsports	64	Toyota	DAY	CAL; DNQ	LVS; 37		BRI; 42	MAR; 43	TEX; DNQ	PHO; DNQ	TAL	RCH; DNQ	DAR	CLT; DNQ	DOV	POC	MCH	SON	NHA	DAY	CHI	IND	POC	GLN	MCH	BRI	ATL	RCH	NHA	DOV	KAN	CAL	CLT	MAR	TAL	TEX	PHO	HOM	58th	123	
2009	Germain Racing	35	Toyota				ATL; DNQ																																	58th	123	
2010	Kirk Shelmerdine Racing	27	Toyota	DAY; DNQ	CAL	LVS	ATL	BRI	MAR	PHO	TEX	TAL	RCH																											53rd	313	
2010	Gunselman Motorsports	64	Toyota											DAR; 39	DOV; DNQ	CLT; 40	POC	MCH; 42	SON	NHA; 40	DAY; DNQ	CHI; DNQ	IND; 37	POC; 37	GLN	MCH	BRI; 41	ATL; DNQ	RCH; DNQ	NHA	DOV	KAN	CAL	CLT	MAR	TAL	TEX	PHO	HOM	53rd	313	
2011	Germain Racing	60	Toyota	DAY; DNQ	PHO	LVS	BRI	CAL; 40	MAR	TEX	TAL	RCH	DAR	DOV	CLT	KAN	POC	MCH	SON	DAY	KEN	NHA	IND																	75th	0^{1}	
2011	HP Racing	66	Toyota																					POC; 37	GLN	MCH; 39	BRI	ATL	RCH	CHI	NHA	DOV	KAN	CLT	TAL	MAR	TEX	PHO	HOM	75th	0^{1}	
^{†} - Qualified for Geoff Bodine

===== Daytona 500 =====
Year	Team	Manufacturer	Start	Finish
1994	Butch Mock Motorsports	Ford	11	36
1995	Butch Mock Motorsports	Ford	8	37
1998	ISM Racing	Pontiac	DNQ	
2001	Haas-Carter Motorsports	Ford	DNQ	
2002	Haas-Carter Motorsports	Ford	22	31
2003	BelCar Racing	Ford	6	18
2010	Kirk Shelmerdine Racing	Toyota	DNQ	
2011	Germain Racing	Toyota	DNQ	

==== Xfinity Series ====
NASCAR Xfinity Series results
Year	Team	No.	Make	1	2	3	4	5	6	7	8	9	10	11	12	13	14	15	16	17	18	19	20	21	22	23	24	25	26	27	28	29	30	31	32	33	34	35	NXSC	Pts	Ref
1986	Pistone Racing	59	Pontiac	DAY	CAR	HCY	MAR	BRI	DAR	SBO	LGY	JFC	DOV	CLT	SBO	HCY	ROU	IRP	SBO	RAL	OXF	SBO	HCY	LGY	ROU	BRI	DAR	RCH	DOV	MAR; 27	ROU	CLT	CAR	MAR					85th	82	
1990	Highline Racing	42	Pontiac	DAY	RCH	CAR	MAR; 8	HCY	DAR	BRI	LAN	SBO; 13	NZH	HCY	CLT	DOV	ROU; 7	VOL	MYB	OXF; 23								RCH; 30											39th	772	
1990	Highline Racing	81	Pontiac																		NHA; 36	SBO	DUB	IRP	ROU	BRI	DAR		DOV; 3	MAR	CLT	NHA; 39	CAR	MAR					39th	772	
1991	Team 34	34	Buick	DAY; 27	RCH; 15	CAR; 4	MAR; 12	VOL; 8	HCY; 8	DAR; 5	BRI; 26	LAN; 8	SBO; 10	NZH; 22	CLT; 39	DOV; 1	ROU; 22	HCY; 18		GLN; 5	OXF; 3	NHA; 22	**SBO**; 6	**DUB**; 18	IRP; 12	ROU; 21	BRI; 22	DAR; 3	RCH; 33	DOV; 26	CLT; 8		CAR; 10	MAR; 4					7th	3825	
1991	Team 34	34	Olds																MYB; 6																				7th	3825	
1991	Team 34	84	Buick																													NHA; 18							7th	3825	
1992	Team 34	34	Chevy	DAY; 24		RCH; 12					HCY; 27	LAN; 6		NZH; 1				MYB; 15			NHA; 6	TAL; 3	IRP; 8		MCH; 1*	NHA; 3		DAR; 10	**RCH**; 7	DOV; 13	CLT; 37			HCY; 3					3rd	4212	
1992	Team 34	34	Buick		CAR; 23		ATL; 20	MAR; 25	DAR; 5	BRI; 20			DUB; 11		CLT; 7	**DOV**; 8	ROU; 6		GLN; 2	VOL; 5				ROU; 4			BRI; 1					MAR; 21	CAR; 3						3rd	4212	
1993	Team 34	34	Chevy	DAY; 41	CAR; 33	RCH; 9	DAR; 5	BRI; 2	HCY; 5	ROU; 22	MAR; 18	**NZH**; 11	CLT; 31	DOV; 1*	MYB; 6	GLN; 5	MLW; 11	TAL; 38	IRP; 19	MCH; 7	NHA; 40	BRI; 1*	DAR; 27	RCH; 18	DOV; 1	ROU; 18	CLT; 5	MAR; 11	CAR; 4	HCY; 10	ATL; 34								9th	3387	
1994	Ernie Irvan Racing	28	Ford	DAY	CAR	RCH	ATL	MAR	DAR	HCY	BRI	ROU	NHA	NZH	CLT	DOV	MYB	GLN	MLW	SBO	TAL	HCY	IRP	MCH	BRI	DAR	RCH	DOV	CLT; 44	MAR	CAR								105th	31	
1995	Group III Racing	81	Ford	DAY	CAR	RCH	ATL	NSV	DAR	BRI	HCY	NHA; 37	NZH	CLT	DOV	MYB	GLN	MLW	TAL	SBO	IRP	MCH	BRI	DAR	RCH	DOV	CLT; DNQ												58th	314	
1995	Parker Racing	72	Chevy																									CAR; 1	HOM; 27										58th	314	
1996	Pro Tech Motorsports	81	Chevy	DAY; 34	CAR; 10	RCH; 8	ATL; 18	NSV; 23	DAR; 8	BRI; 17	HCY; 5	NZH; 9	CLT; 14	DOV; 18	SBO; 1	MYB; 12	GLN; 2	MLW; 31*	NHA; 7	TAL; 23	IRP; 35	MCH; 24	BRI; 34	DAR; 14	RCH; 19	DOV; 11	CLT; 14	CAR; 11											3rd	3064	
1996	Pro Tech Motorsports	82	Chevy																										HOM; 8										3rd	3064	
1997	Team 34	36	Pontiac	DAY; 2	CAR; 7	RCH; 7	ATL; 6	LVS; 3	DAR; 10	HCY; 5	TEX; 4	BRI; 30	NSV; 5	TAL; 8	NHA; 6*	NZH; 2	CLT; 7	DOV; 7	SBO; 9	GLN; 2	MLW; 11	MYB; 4	GTY; 24	IRP; 25	MCH; 6	BRI; 8	DAR; 8	RCH; 25	DOV; 15	CLT; 20	CAL; 1	CAR; 34	HOM; 7						2nd	4115	
1998	Team 34	30	Chevy	DAY	CAR	LVS	NSV	DAR	BRI	TEX	HCY	TAL	NHA	NZH	CLT	DOV	RCH	PPR	GLN	MLW	MYB	CAL; 33	SBO; 5	IRP; 15	MCH; 12	BRI; 4	DAR; 5	RCH; 5	DOV; 5	CLT; 8	GTY; 9	CAR; 12	ATL; 15	HOM; 38					33rd	1668	
1999	Cicci-Welliver Racing	66	Chevy	DAY; 32	CAR; 9	LVS; 40	ATL; 5	DAR; 10	TEX; 37	NSV; 5	BRI; 5	TAL; 31	CAL; 25	NHA; 9	RCH; 4	NZH; 15	CLT; 9	DOV; 3	SBO; 12	GLN; 9	MLW; 8	MYB; 6	PPR; 3	GTY; 10	IRP; 2	MCH; 13	BRI; 5	DAR; 10	RCH; 38	DOV; 32	CLT; 9	CAR; 5	MEM; 4*	PHO; 9	HOM; 32				4th	4029	
2000	Cicci-Welliver Racing	66	Chevy	DAY; 34	CAR; 8	LVS; 4	ATL; 4	DAR; 5	BRI; 3	TEX; 4	NSV; 9	TAL; 25	CAL; 5	RCH; 7	NHA; 4	CLT; 5	DOV; 13	SBO; 36	MYB; 6	GLN; 4	MLW; 31	NZH; 40	PPR; 21	GTY; 3	IRP; 7	MCH; 1*	BRI; 30	DAR; 16	**RCH**; 4	DOV; 4	CLT; 42	CAR; 4	MEM; 20	PHO; 12	HOM; 32				4th	4075	
2001	Buckshot Racing	00	Pontiac	DAY; 38								TAL; 4																											29th	1915	
2001	Buckshot Racing	00	Chevy		CAR; 1*	LVS; 1*	ATL; 5	DAR; 34	BRI; 19	TEX; 35	NSH; 10		CAL; 17	RCH; 35	NHA	NZH	CLT; 4	DOV	KEN	MLW	GLN	CHI	GTY	PPR	IRP	MCH	BRI	DAR	RCH	DOV	KAN								29th	1915	
2001	HighLine Performance Group	11	Chevy																													CLT; 15	MEM	PHO; 5	CAR; 24	HOM; 15			29th	1915	
2002	Herzog-Jackson Motorsports	92	Chevy	DAY	CAR	LVS	DAR; 8	BRI; 8	TEX; 30	NSH; 18	TAL; 4	CAL; 22	RCH; 40	NHA; 2	NZH; 23	CLT; 5	DOV; 12	NSH; 11	KEN; 1	MLW; 26	DAY; 27	**CHI**; 2	GTY; 32	PPR; 37	IRP; 12	MCH; 4	BRI; 16	DAR; 17	RCH; 13	DOV; 43	KAN; 32	CLT	MEM	ATL	CAR; 12	PHO; 34	HOM; 39		23rd	3071	
2003	Herzog-Jackson Motorsports	92	Chevy	DAY; 6	CAR; 3	LVS; 19	DAR; 1*	BRI; 9	TEX; 4	TAL; 27	NSH; 13	CAL; 5	RCH; 29	GTY; 11	NZH; 5	CLT; 4	DOV; 7	NSH; 26	KEN; 29	MLW; 8	DAY; 8																		17th	2763	
2003	Evans Motorsports	7	Chevy																			CHI; 31	NHA	PPR	IRP	MCH	BRI	DAR	RCH	DOV									17th	2763	
2003	Innovative Motorsports	48	Chevy																												KAN; 29	CLT	MEM	ATL; 18	PHO	CAR; 19	HOM		17th	2763	
2004	GIC-Mixon Motorsports	24	Chevy	DAY	CAR	LVS	DAR	BRI	TEX	NSH	TAL	CAL	GTY	RCH; 24	NZH	CLT																							53rd	628	
2004	Marsh Racing	31	Ford														DOV; 20	NSH	KEN	MLW	DAY	CHI; 24	NHA; 14	PPR	IRP	MCH	BRI	CAL	RCH; DNQ	DOV	KAN	CLT	MEM	ATL; DNQ	PHO	DAR; 32	HOM; 5		53rd	628	
2005	Curb Agajanian Performance Group	43	Chevy	DAY	CAL	MXC	LVS	ATL	NSH	BRI	TEX	PHO	TAL	DAR	RCH	CLT; DNQ	DOV	NSH	KEN	MLW	DAY	CHI	NHA	PPR	GTY	IRP	GLN	MCH											80th	341	
2005	Frank Cicci Racing	34	Chevy																										BRI; 21	CAL	RCH	DOV	KAN; 33	CLT; 32	MEM	TEX; 32	PHO	HOM; 40	80th	341	
2006	Frank Cicci Racing	34	Chevy	DAY	CAL; 37	MXC	LVS	ATL	BRI	TEX	NSH	PHO	TAL	RCH	DAR	CLT	DOV; 36	NSH	KEN	MLW	DAY	CHI	NHA	MAR	GTY	IRP	GLN	MCH	BRI	CAL	RCH	DOV	KAN	CLT	MEM	TEX	PHO	HOM	111th	107	
2007	Braun Racing	10	Toyota	DAY	CAL	MXC	LVS	ATL	BRI	NSH	TEX	PHO	TAL	RCH	DAR	CLT	DOV	NSH	KEN	MLW; 6	NHA	DAY	CHI																57th	707	
2007	Germain Racing	03	Toyota																					GTY; 10	IRP	CGV	GLN	MCH; 8	BRI	CAL	RCH; 20	DOV	KAN; 14	CLT	MEM	TEX	PHO	HOM; 37	57th	707	
2008	MSRP Motorsports	90	Chevy	DAY	CAL	LVS; 37	ATL	BRI	NSH	TEX	PHO	MXC	TAL	RCH																									84th	246	
2008	Germain Racing	03	Toyota												DAR; 4	CLT	DOV	NSH	KEN	MLW	NHA	DAY	CHI	GTY	IRP	CGV	GLN	MCH	BRI	CAL	RCH	DOV	KAN	CLT	MEM	TEX	PHO		84th	246	
2008	MSRP Motorsports	91	Chevy																																			HOM; 43	84th	246	
2009	Smith-Ganassi Racing	42	Dodge	DAY	CAL	LVS	BRI	TEX	NSH	PHO	TAL	RCH	DAR	CLT	DOV	NSH	KEN	MLW	NHA	DAY	CHI	GTY	IRP	IOW	GLN	MCH	BRI	CGV	ATL	RCH	DOV	KAN	CAL	CLT	MEM	TEX	PHO	HOM; QL^{†}	NA	-	
2011	Germain Racing	15	Toyota	DAY; 18	PHO	LVS	BRI	CAL	TEX	TAL	NSH	RCH	DAR	DOV	IOW	CLT	CHI	MCH	ROA	DAY	KEN	NHA	NSH	IRP	IOW	GLN	CGV	BRI	ATL	RCH	CHI	DOV	KAN	CLT	TEX	PHO	HOM		119th	0^{1}	
2014	SS-Green Light Racing	55	Chevy	DAY	PHO	LVS	BRI	CAL	TEX	DAR; 28	RCH	TAL	IOW	CLT	DOV; 36	MCH	ROA	KEN	DAY	NHA	CHI	IND	IOW	GLN	MOH	BRI	ATL	RCH	CHI	KEN	DOV	KAN	CLT	TEX	PHO	HOM			113th	0^{1}	
2015	SS-Green Light Racing	90	Chevy	DAY	ATL	LVS	PHO	CAL	TEX	BRI; 24	RCH	TAL	IOW; 24	CLT	DOV	MCH	CHI	DAY	KEN	NHA	IND	IOW	GLN; 19	MOH	BRI	ROA	DAR; 29	RCH	CHI	KEN	DOV	CLT	KAN	TEX	PHO	HOM			44th	80	
2016	SS-Green Light Racing	90	Chevy	DAY	ATL	LVS	PHO	CAL	TEX	BRI	RCH	TAL	DOV	CLT	POC	MCH	IOW	DAY	KEN	NHA	IND	IOW	GLN; 34	MOH	BRI	ROA	DAR	RCH	CHI	KEN	DOV	CLT	KAN	TEX	PHO	HOM			76th	7	
2017	SS-Green Light Racing	07	Chevy	DAY	ATL	LVS	PHO	CAL	TEX	BRI	RCH	TAL	CLT; 30	DOV	POC	MCH	IOW	DAY	KEN	NHA	IND	IOW	GLN	MOH	BRI	ROA	DAR	RCH	CHI	KEN	DOV	CLT	KAN	TEX	PHO	HOM			74th	7	
^{†} - Qualified for Parker Kligerman

==== Camping World Truck Series ====
NASCAR Camping World Truck Series results
Year	Team	No.	Make	1	2	3	4	5	6	7	8	9	10	11	12	13	14	15	16	17	18	19	20	21	22	23	24	25	NCWTC	Pts	Ref
1995	Roush Racing	61	Ford	PHO	TUS	SGS	MMR	POR	EVG	I70	LVL	BRI	MLW	CNS	HPT; 4	IRP	FLM	RCH; 6	MAR; 6	NWS; 7	SON	MMR; 8	PHO						32nd	748	
2004	Fiddle Back Racing	67	Ford	DAY	ATL	MAR	MFD	CLT; 20	DOV	TEX	MEM	MLW																	27th	1317	
2004	HT Motorsports	59	Dodge										KAN; 15	KEN	GTY	MCH	IRP	NSH	BRI										27th	1317	
2004	Germain-Arnold Racing	30	Toyota																	RCH; 4	NHA; 34	LVS; 2	CAL; 1	TEX; 1*	MAR; 7	PHO; 29	DAR; 20	HOM; DNQ	27th	1317	
2005	Fiddle Back Racing	66	Toyota	DAY; 3*	CAL; 36	ATL; 12	MAR; 4*	GTY; 7	MFD; 16	CLT; 31	DOV; 28	TEX; 30	MCH; 9																3rd	3462	
2005	Germain Racing	30	Toyota											MLW; 34	KAN; 1*	KEN; 2	MEM; 23	IRP; 15	NSH; 3	BRI; 2	RCH; 2	NHA; 22	LVS; 1*	MAR; 10	ATL; 2	TEX; 1	PHO; 1	HOM; 1*	3rd	3462	
2006	Germain Racing	30	Toyota	DAY; 2	CAL; 2	**ATL**; 1	MAR; 12	GTY; 1*	CLT; 3	MFD; 15	DOV; 3	TEX; 1	MCH; 4	MLW; 20	KAN; 7	KEN; 10	MEM; 15	IRP; 7	NSH; 8	BRI; 2	NHA; 4	LVS; 12	TAL; 4	MAR; 14	ATL; 25	TEX; 14	PHO; 4	HOM; 21	1st	3666	
2007	Germain Racing	30	Toyota	DAY; 5	CAL; 7	ATL; 2	MAR; 2	KAN; 7	CLT; 3	MFD; 31	DOV; 11	**TEX**; 1	MCH; 7	MLW; 3	MEM; 8	KEN; 11	IRP; 6	NSH; 5	BRI; 24	GTY; 4	NHA; 4	LVS; 28	**TAL**; 1*	MAR; 20	ATL; 24	TEX; 16	PHO; 6	HOM; 14	4th	3525	
2008	Germain Racing	30	Toyota	DAY; 1*	CAL; 2	ATL; 9	MAR; 12	KAN; 23	CLT; 12	MFD; 3	DOV; 29	TEX; 5	MCH; 4	MLW; 5	MEM; 14	KEN; 27	IRP; 22	**NSH**; 3*	BRI; 2	GTY; 4	NHA; 19	LVS; 9	TAL; 1	MAR; 5	ATL; 4	TEX; 4	PHO; 3	HOM; 1	3rd	3621	
2009	Germain Racing	30	Toyota	DAY; 1*	CAL; 2	ATL; 3	MAR; 18	KAN; 21	CLT; 25	DOV; 18	TEX; 1	MCH; 13	MLW; 4	MEM; 10	KEN; 16*	IRP; 18	NSH; 13	BRI; 32	CHI; 2	IOW; 19	GTY; 18	NHA; 24	**LVS**; 4	MAR; 2	TAL; 3	TEX; 4	PHO; 12	HOM; 5	4th	3432	
2010	Germain Racing	30	Toyota	DAY; 2*	ATL; 5	MAR; 30	NSH; 5	KAN; 3	DOV; 5	CLT; 2	TEX; 1*	MCH; 2*	IOW; 17	GTY; 4	IRP; 7	POC; 12	**NSH**; 1*	DAR; 1*	BRI; 6	**CHI**; 2	KEN; 1	NHA; 9	LVS; 4	MAR; 3*	TAL; 18	TEX; 4	PHO; 12	HOM; 4	1st	3937	
2011	Germain Racing	30	Toyota	DAY; 23	PHO; 14	DAR; 3	MAR; 14	NSH; 19	DOV; 27	CLT; 27	KAN; 3	TEX; 31	KEN; 4																6th	803	
2011	Randy Moss Motorsports	5	Toyota											IOW; 10	NSH; 6	IRP; 12	POC; 12	MCH; 11	BRI; 3	ATL; 9	CHI; 13	NHA; 8	KEN; 7	LVS; 5	TAL; 6	MAR; 11	TEX; 13	HOM; 16	6th	803	
2012	Red Horse Racing	11	Toyota	DAY; 6	MAR; 25	CAR; 31	KAN; 5	CLT; 3	DOV; 1	TEX; 30	KEN; 28	IOW; 12	CHI; 18	POC; 26	MCH; 24	BRI; 31	ATL; 21	IOW; 3	KEN; 30	LVS; 5	TAL; 33	MAR; 22	TEX; 8	PHO; 28	HOM; 11				14th	574	
2013	ThorSport Racing	13	Toyota	DAY; 11	MAR; 11	CAR; 32	KAN; 21	CLT; 17	DOV; 19	TEX; 18	KEN	IOW	ELD																28th	215	
2013	Turner Scott Motorsports	30	Chevy											POC; 11	MCH	BRI	MSP	IOW	CHI	LVS	TAL	MAR	TEX	PHO	HOM				28th	215	
2022	Halmar Friesen Racing	62	Toyota	DAY	LVS; 21	ATL	COA	MAR	BRI	DAR; 10	KAN	TEX; 13	CLT	GTW	SON; 20	KNX	NSH; 27	MOH	POC; 36	IRP	RCH	KAN	BRI	TAL	HOM	PHO			36th	98	

^{*} Season still in progress
^{1} Ineligible for series points

=== ARCA Re/Max Series ===
(key) (Bold – Pole position awarded by qualifying time. Italics – Pole position earned by points standings or practice time. * – Most laps led.)

ARCA Re/Max Series results
Year	Team	No.	Make	1	2	3	4	5	6	7	8	9	10	11	12	13	14	15	16	17	18	19	20	21	22	ARMC	Pts	Ref
2004	Shaver Motorsports	49	Pontiac	DAY	NSH; 40	SLM	KEN	TOL	CLT	KAN	POC	MCH	SBO	BLN	KEN	GTW	POC	LER	NSH	ISF	TOL	DSF	CHI	SLM	TAL	189th	30	

Sporting positions
Preceded by Ted Musgrave	NASCAR Craftsman Truck Series Champion; 2006	Succeeded by Ron Hornaday Jr.
Preceded by Ron Hornaday Jr.	NASCAR Camping World Truck Series Champion; 2010	Succeeded by Austin Dillon
