= Bryan Reffner =

American stock car racing driver

- Born: Bryan Lee Reffner; November 6, 1963 (age 63); Rudolph, Wisconsin, U.S.
- Achievements: 1988 ARTGO Champion; 1989, 1990 Track Champion (Madison); 1995 American Speed Association Champion; 2005 American Stockcar League Champion
- Awards: 1988 ARTGO Rookie of the Year; 1996 Craftsman Truck Series Rookie of the Year

NASCAR O'Reilly Auto Parts Series career
- 3 races run over 2 years
- Best finish: 108th (2002)
- First race: 2002 Cabela's 250 (Michigan)
- Last race: 2005 Wallace Family Tribute 250 (Gateway)
Wins	Top tens	Poles
0	0	0

NASCAR FedEx Freight Truck Series career
- 126 races run over 8 years
- Best finish: 9th (1996, 2000)
- First race: 1996 Florida Dodge Dealers 400 (Homestead)
- Last race: 2003 Ford 200 (Homestead)
- First win: 2000 O'Reilly 400 (Texas)
Wins	Top tens	Poles
1	38	5
- Statistics up to date as of March 8, 2012.

Bryan Lee Reffner (born November 6, 1963) is an American former NASCAR Craftsman Truck Series driver. He was also a champion in the American Speed Association.

== Career prior to NASCAR ==
Reffner began racing at age 16. Reffner became a regular competitor in the late model division at Madison International Speedway. He was named the ARTGO Series (now NASCAR AutoZone Elite Division, Midwest Series) rookie-of-the-year in 1983. Reffner won three track championships in 1989 and 1990.

Reffner moved to the American Speed Association in 1994, and became the 1995 ASA champion.

== NASCAR career ==
Reffner made his Craftsman Truck Series debut in 1996, winning Rookie of the Year, driving the No. 44 1-800-COLLECT Ford for Mark Simo. He finished the year with three top-fives, nine top-tens, and three poles, finishing ninth in the points. He continued to run full-time in 1997, posting two top-tens for Dale Phelon. In 1998, he started the year with Phelon, but was released, and spent the rest of the season running with Liberty Racing and MB Motorsports. He had eight top-tens and finished 22nd in points.

1999 turned out to be a short year for him, as he ran only thirteen races. He started the year signed to drive for a new two-truck operation, Ridge Gate Motion Sports, owned by Mike Clark and Dominic Dobson. However, he left the team early in the season as he felt the team had not lived up to its obligations, and spent the year with Conely Racing, running thirteen races. In 2000 however, he had a breakthrough year, driving for Team Menard. He won his first career race at Texas Motor Speedway, (a race that unfortunately marked the death of Tony Roper) and having sixteen top-tens, finishing ninth in the points. Four races into 2001 however, Team Menard suspended operations, and Reffner ran just a handful of races, for Conely and TKO Motorsports. He had three top-tens during that season. He ran three races in 2002, his best finish a thirteenth at Michigan. He also made his Busch Series debut at Michigan. Driving the No. 0 for Conely, he started 25th and finished 29th. In 2003, he made his last two CTS starts to date, driving his self-owned No. 80 at Richmond and Homestead.

In 2003, Reffner returned to the American Speed Association, and finished sixth in points.

In 2005, Reffner made two starts for Smith Bros. Racing, but failed to finish higher than 35th. He also made a failed attempt at qualifying for the NEXTEL Cup Phoenix race with Competitive Edge Motorsports. He also was leading the points in the American Stockcar League series going into the final three races of 2005 and was declared the ASL Champion when the final races were canceled.

== Motorsports career results ==
=== NASCAR ===
(key) (Bold – Pole position awarded by qualifying time. Italics – Pole position earned by points standings or practice time. * – Most laps led.)

==== Nextel Cup Series ====
NASCAR Nextel Cup Series results
Year	Team	No.	Make	1	2	3	4	5	6	7	8	9	10	11	12	13	14	15	16	17	18	19	20	21	22	23	24	25	26	27	28	29	30	31	32	33	34	35	36	NNCC	Pts	Ref
2005	Conely Racing	79	Chevy	DAY	CAL	LVS	ATL	BRI	MAR	TEX	PHO	TAL	DAR	RCH	CLT	DOV	POC	MCH	SON	DAY	CHI	NHA	POC	IND	GLN	MCH; DNQ	BRI	CAL	RCH	NHA	DOV	TAL	KAN	CLT	MAR	ATL	TEX			NA	-	
2005	Competitive Edge Motorsports	51	Chevy																																			PHO; DNQ	HOM	NA	-	

==== Busch Series ====
NASCAR Busch Series results
Year	Team	No.	Make	1	2	3	4	5	6	7	8	9	10	11	12	13	14	15	16	17	18	19	20	21	22	23	24	25	26	27	28	29	30	31	32	33	34	35	NBSC	Pts	Ref
2002	Conely Racing	0	Chevy	DAY	CAR	LVS	DAR	BRI	TEX	NSH	TAL	CAL	RCH	NHA	NZH	CLT	DOV	NSH	KEN	MLW	DAY	CHI	GTY	PPR	IRP	MCH; 29	BRI	DAR	RCH	DOV	KAN	CLT							108th	76	
2002	Conely Racing	70	Chevy																														MEM; DNQ	ATL	CAR	PHO			108th	76	
2002	Conely Racing	07	Chevy																																		HOM; DNQ		108th	76	
2005	Smith Brothers Motorsports	67	Dodge	DAY	CAL	MXC	LVS	ATL	NSH	BRI	TEX	PHO	TAL	DAR	RCH	CLT	DOV	NSH	KEN	MLW; 35	DAY	CHI	NHA	PPR	GTY; 43	IRP	GLN	MCH	BRI	CAL	RCH	DOV; DNQ	KAN	CLT	MEM	TEX	PHO	HOM	143rd	34	

==== Craftsman Truck Series ====
NASCAR Craftsman Truck Series results
Year	Team	No.	Make	1	2	3	4	5	6	7	8	9	10	11	12	13	14	15	16	17	18	19	20	21	22	23	24	25	26	27	NCTC	Pts	Ref
1996	Irvan-Simo Racing	44	Ford	HOM; 5	PHO; 4	POR; 7	EVG; 24	**TUS**; 11	CNS; 16	HPT; 14	BRI; 23	NZH; 10	MLW; 24	LVL; 6	I70; 12	IRP; 20		GLN; 13	NSV; 5	RCH; 19	NHA; 7	MAR; 17	NWS; 34	SON; 8	MMR; 13	PHO; 18	**LVS**; 9				9th	2961	
1996	Irvan-Simo Racing	28	Ford														**FLM**; 12														9th	2961	
1997	Phelon Motorsports	66	Ford	WDW; 21	TUS; 31	HOM; 31	PHO; 34	POR; 21	EVG; 24	I70; 20	NHA; 8	TEX; 30	BRI; 10	NZH; 11	MLW; 13	LVL; 23	CNS; 15	HPT; 19	IRP; 15	FLM; 21	NSV; 29	GLN; 19	RCH; 15	MAR; 29	SON; 32	MMR; 32	CAL; 32	PHO; 30	LVS; 38		19th	2433	
1998	Phelon Motorsports	66	Ford	WDW; 13	HOM; 31	PHO; 8	POR; 7	EVG; 8	I70; 4	GLN; 18	TEX; 35	BRI; 10	MLW; 19	NZH; 8	CAL; 13	PPR; 29	IRP; 12	NHA; 31	FLM; 3	NSV; 14											22nd	2770	
1998	Liberty Racing	98	Ford																		HPT; 34										22nd	2770	
1998	MB Motorsports	26	Ford																			LVL; 15	RCH; 35	MEM; 28							22nd	2770	
1998	Liberty Racing	84	Ford																						GTY; 10						22nd	2770	
1998	M & J Racing	22	Ford																							MAR; 23					22nd	2770	
1998	L&R Racing	1	Dodge																								SON; 32	MMR			22nd	2770	
1998	Ridge Gate Motorsports	39	Chevy																										PHO; 24	LVS; 37	22nd	2770	
1999	Conely Racing	7	Chevy	HOM	PHO	EVG	MMR; 23	MAR; 34	MEM; 14	PPR; 18	I70; 23	BRI; 24	TEX; 23	PIR	GLN	MLW; 21	NSV; 31	NZH; 20	MCH; 20	NHA; 16	IRP; 18	GTY	HPT	RCH	LVS	LVL	TEX	CAL			26th	1274	
2000	Team Menard	3	Chevy	DAY; 35	HOM; 30	PHO; 11	MMR; 6	MAR; 8	PIR; 7	GTY; 8	MEM; 8	PPR; 8	EVG; 10	TEX; 5	**KEN**; 5	GLN; 13	MLW; 10	NHA; 28	NZH; 9	MCH; 15	IRP; 8	NSV; 8	CIC; 7	RCH; 11	DOV; 29	**TEX**; 1	CAL; 6				9th	3153	
2001	Team Menard	3	Chevy	DAY; 8	HOM; 28	MMR; 18	MAR; 8	GTY	DAR	PPR	DOV	TEX	MEM	MLW	KAN	KEN	NHA	IRP	NSH	CIC	NZH	RCH	SBO								30th	952	
2001	TKO Motorsports	41	Dodge																					TEX; 20		PHO; 5	CAL; 20				30th	952	
2001	Conely Racing	7	Chevy																						LVS; 18						30th	952	
2002	Conely Racing	7	Chevy	DAY	DAR	MAR	GTY	PPR	DOV	TEX	MEM	MLW	KAN	KEN; 31	NHA	MCH; 13	IRP	NSH	RCH	TEX	SBO	LVS	CAL	PHO	HOM; 27						63rd	206	
2003	Bryan Reffner	80	Chevy	DAY	DAR	MMR	MAR	CLT	DOV	TEX	MEM	MLW	KAN	KEN	GTW	MCH	IRP	NSH	BRI	RCH; 13	NHA	CAL	LVS	SBO	TEX	MAR	PHO	HOM; 31			81st	194	

=== ARCA Re/Max Series ===
(key) (Bold – Pole position awarded by qualifying time. Italics – Pole position earned by points standings or practice time. * – Most laps led.)

ARCA Re/Max Series results
Year	Team	No.	Make	1	2	3	4	5	6	7	8	9	10	11	12	13	14	15	16	17	18	19	20	21	22	23	ARSC	Pts	Ref
2006	Eddie Sharp Racing	22	Chevy	DAY	NSH	SLM	WIN	KEN	TOL	POC	MCH	KAN	KEN	BLN	POC	GTW	NSH	MCH	ISF	MIL	TOL	DSF	CHI	SLM	TAL	IOW; 36	169th	50	
2007	Hendren Motorsports	66	Chevy	DAY	USA	NSH	SLM	KAN	WIN	KEN	TOL	IOW; 12	POC	MCH	BLN	KEN; 15	POC	NSH	ISF	MIL	GTW	DSF	CHI; 28	SLM	TAL	TOL	61st	420	
2008	Hendren Motorsports	66	Chevy	DAY	SLM	IOW	KAN	CAR	KEN	TOL	POC	MCH; 14	CAY	KEN; 14	BLN	POC	NSH	ISF	DSF	CHI; 16	SLM	NJE	TAL	TOL			57th	470	

Sporting positions
Preceded by Butch Miller	ASA National Tour Champion; 1995	Succeeded by Tony Raines
Preceded by Kevin Cywinski	American Stockcar League Champion; 2005	Succeeded by Final season
Achievements
Preceded by Inaugural season	NASCAR Craftsman Truck Series Rookie of the Year; 1996	Succeeded by Kenny Irwin Jr.
