= Lance Norick =

American stock car and R/C racing driver (born 1968)

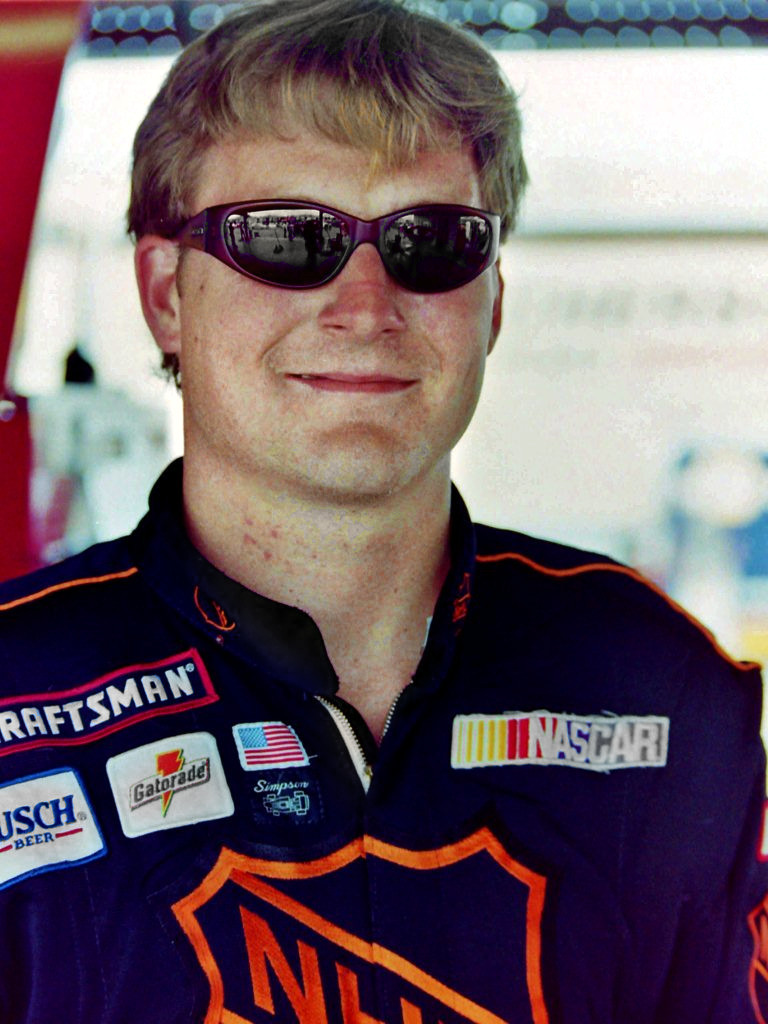
- Norick in 1997
- Born: September 20, 1968 (age 58); Oklahoma City, Oklahoma, U.S.
- Achievements: 2011 NASCAR Camping World Truck Series Champion
- Awards: 2008 K&N Pro Series East Rookie of the Year; 2010 Camping World Truck Series Rookie of the Year

NASCAR O'Reilly Auto Parts Series career
- 7 races run over 1 year
- Best finish: 64th (2003)
- First race: 2003 O'Reilly 300 (Texas)
- Last race: 2003 Tropicana Twister 300 (Joliet)
Wins	Top tens	Poles
0	0	0

NASCAR FedEx Freight Truck Series career
- 154 races run over 7 years
- Best finish: 11th (2001)
- First race: 1996 Florida Dodge Dealers 400 (Homestead)
- Last race: 2002 Ford 200 (Homestead)
Wins	Top tens	Poles
0	15	0

Lance Norick (born September 20, 1968) is an American stock car and sprint car racing driver, and a professional remote control car racer. A former competitor in the NASCAR Busch Series and Craftsman Truck Series, he is the son of former Oklahoma City mayor Ron Norick.

== Career ==
The son of Oklahoma City mayor Ron Norick, Lance Norick began his career in motocross, before moving to Formula Ford 2000 open-wheel cars, where he was a teammate to the son of Johnny Rutherford, before moving to the NASCAR Craftsman Truck Series for the 1996 season.

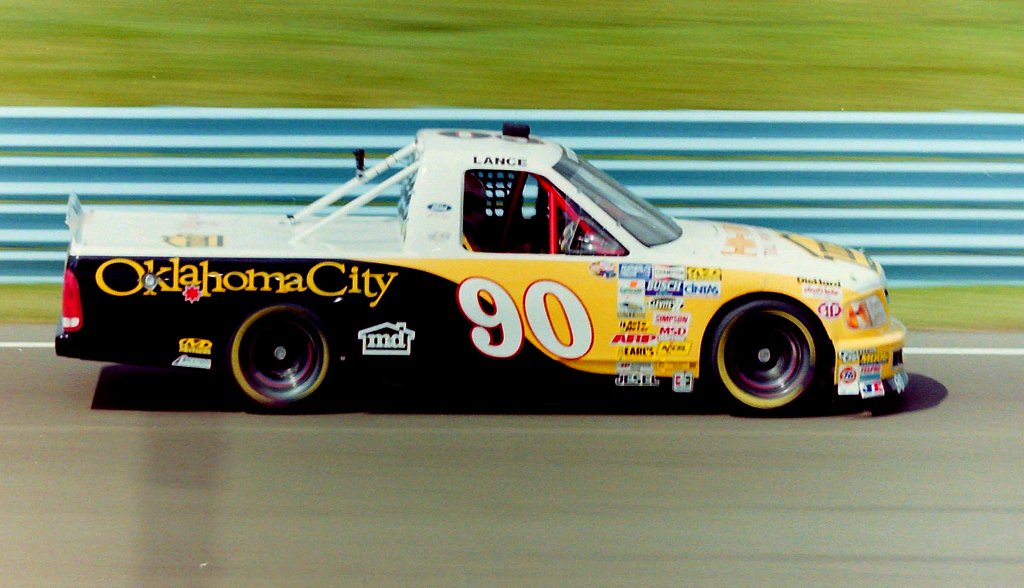
Norick's late 1996 truck.

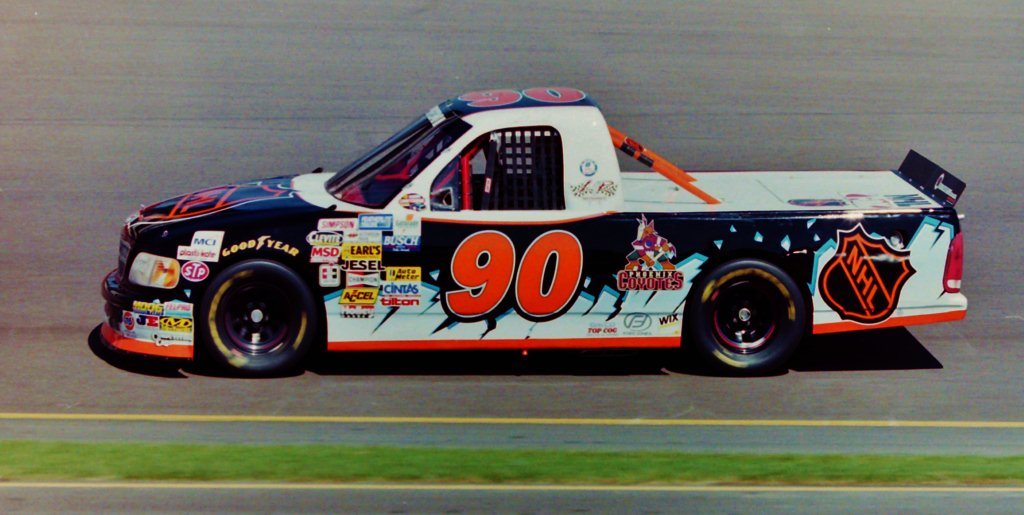
Norick's 1997 truck.

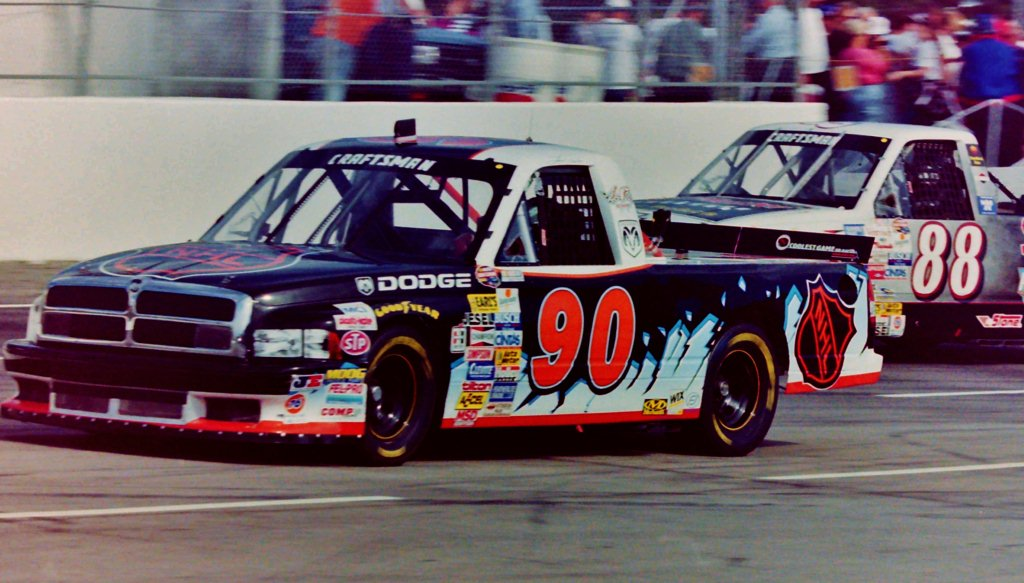
Norick (No. 90) racing Terry Cook (No. 88) in 1998.

Driving the No. 19 Dodge Ram for Walker Evans Racing with sponsorship from Macklanburg-Duncan, Norick made his NASCAR debut in 1996 at the Homestead–Miami Speedway, qualifying and finishing eighteenth in his first race in the series. Norick posted his best finish of the season, ninth, at Bristol Motor Speedway in the Coca-Cola 200 in June; midway through the season Norick's father purchased the team from Evans, switching to the No. 90 and Ford with sponsorship from the Oklahoma City Chamber of Commerce; now named L & R Motorsports, they completed the season with a best finish in the second half of 13th at Sears Point Raceway, and Norick finished eighteenth in the final season points standings.

For 1997 Norick ran just fifteen races but gained financial backing from the National Hockey League, which arranged for a different team to be featured on the truck at each event. Norick posted a best finish of the season at Homestead, in the second race of the year and the first with NHL sponsorship, finishing tenth; Norick finished the season 25th in series points. The NHL returned with a full season's sponsorship for 1998; Norick's team, based in Blythe, California, added a second truck for veteran Butch Miller, with sponsorship from Dana. Norick had a best finish of seventh at Sears Point International Raceway, a new career best, but failed to qualify for two races; he finished 23rd in the series standings at the end of the year. Norick also competed in six events in the NASCAR Winston West Series during the 1998 season, posting a best finish of seventh at California Speedway in July.

Norick started 1999 with sponsorship from Oklahoma City-based Big Daddy's BBQ Sauce; the company ran into issues with its racing program, and the sponsorship deal was dropped after eight races of the 24-race schedule, leaving Norick's team, once again a single-truck effort, to run most of the year unsponsored. Norick's best finish of the year was ninth at Watkins Glen; he finished 20th in series points. At Watkins Glen, Norick was the first Truck Series driver to operate his vehicle under racing conditions while using rain tires, when practice sessions were run under sprinkly conditions. His team also switched from Dodge to Chevrolet during the season, although it also ran a Ford in a race at Gateway Motorsports Park.

In 2000 with backing from Aventis Behring, Norick qualified for every race on the Truck Series season schedule for the first time in his career, and finished sixteenth in points. Norick was involved in a major wreck at the season-opening Daytona 250 at Daytona International Speedway, suffering burns to his neck.

In 2001 Norick posted his best career finish overall in the Craftsman Truck Series, finishing third at the short-lived Chicago Motor Speedway; finishes of fourth in the season-opening race at Daytona and fifth in October at Texas Motor Speedway proved to be the only other top five finishes he would score in his career in the series, pointing the way to Norick's scoring a career best in the series points standings, finishing eleventh at the end of the season. Norick returned to the series in 2002 with sponsorship from Express Personnel Services; he scored five top-ten finishes during the season, finishing 13th in points; however additional funding for continuing in the series failed to materialise, and Norick's team closed at the end of the year, the team being sold off.

In 2003 Norick ran a limited schedule in the NASCAR Busch Series, signing with Carroll Racing to co-drive with Kevin Grubb with sponsorship from Express Personnel Services. He also signed with Morgan-Dollar Motorsports to compete in the 24 Hours of Daytona endurance race, co-driving a Chevrolet Corvette in the GTS class with Charles and Rob Morgan and Jim Pace. The team led the GTS class for 23 of the 24 hours, before mechanical issues dropped them to finish second in class, and tenth overall in the event. Norick and Morgan co-drove a Corvette in the following event on the Grand American Sports Car schedule at Homestead–Miami Speedway, finishing eleventh.

Norick's debut in Busch Series competition was originally scheduled to be at Bristol Motor Speedway in March, but due to a lack of testing time his debut was moved back one week to the O'Reilly 300 at Texas Motor Speedway. Norick's best finish with Carroll Racing came at Nashville Superspeedway in April, where he finished 17th; after five races with the team, and a DNQ at Charlotte Motor Speedway, Norick moved to Braun Racing for the final two events of his 2003 season, finishing 31st at Daytona and 29th at Chicagoland Speedway in July; these were the final NASCAR-sanctioned events that Norick would compete in.

== Post-NASCAR life ==
Norick currently is a professional radio-controlled car driver, also producing parts and equipment for the sport, operating tracks, and organizing professional competitions. He is also the former owner of Victory Lane Indoor Karting Center in Charlotte, North Carolina, which he founded and operated before selling to Fred Ogrim in 2007, prior to a move to Arizona, where Norick occasionally competes in local sprint car and short track racing events.

Norick currently resides in Oklahoma; he is married to Darcey, who also races remote-control cars, and both are involved in mounted shooting events. He is also involved in the construction industry, and in 2011 jointly applied to operate a medicinal marijuana dispensary in Scottsdale, Arizona. He opened a hardware store in North Oklahoma City in 2018. He also competes in regional sprint car competition.

== Motorsports career results ==
=== NASCAR ===
(key) (Bold – Pole position awarded by qualifying time. Italics – Pole position earned by points standings or practice time. * – Most laps led.)

==== Busch Series ====
NASCAR Busch Series results
Year	Team	No.	Make	1	2	3	4	5	6	7	8	9	10	11	12	13	14	15	16	17	18	19	20	21	22	23	24	25	26	27	28	29	30	31	32	33	34	NBSC	Pts	Ref
2003	Carroll Racing	90	Dodge	DAY	CAR	LVS	DAR	BRI	TEX; 35	TAL						CLT; DNQ	DOV																					64th	577	
2003	Carroll Racing	26	Dodge								NSH; 17	CAL; 35	RCH	GTY	NZH			NSH; 23	KEN; 18	MLW																		64th	577	
2003	Braun Racing	30	Dodge																		DAY; 31	CHI; 29	NHA	PPR	IRP	MCH	BRI	DAR	RCH	DOV	KAN	CLT	MEM	ATL	PHO	CAR	HOM	64th	577	

==== Craftsman Truck Series ====
NASCAR Craftsman Truck Series results
Year	Team	No.	Make	1	2	3	4	5	6	7	8	9	10	11	12	13	14	15	16	17	18	19	20	21	22	23	24	25	26	27	NCTC	Pts	Ref
1996	Walker Evans Racing	19	Dodge	HOM; 18	PHO; 16	POR; 24	EVG; 22	TUS; 26	CNS; 24	HPT; 22	BRI; 9	NZH; 29	MLW; 33	LVL; 15	I70; 17																18th	2168	
1996	Walker Evans Racing	19	Ford													IRP; 24	FLM; 13														18th	2168	
1996	L&R Racing	90	Ford															GLN; 28	NSV; 34	RCH; DNQ	NHA; 25	MAR; 23	NWS; DNQ	SON; 13	MMR; 22	PHO; 36	LVS; 31				18th	2168	
1997	L&R Racing	90	Ford	WDW; 33	TUS; DNQ	HOM; 10	PHO; 15	POR; 20	EVG; 31	I70; DNQ	NHA; 21	TEX; 17	BRI; 28	NZH; 35	MLW; 33	LVL	CNS	HPT; 34	IRP	FLM	NSV										25th	1620	
1997	L&R Racing	90	Dodge																			GLN; DNQ	RCH	MAR; DNQ	SON; 19	MMR; 25	CAL; 21	PHO; DNQ	LVS; 14		25th	1620	
1998	L&R Racing	90	Dodge	WDW; DNQ	HOM; 27	PHO; 35	POR; 21	EVG; 14	I70; 30	GLN; 25	TEX; 19	BRI; 32	MLW; 22	NZH; 21	CAL; 17	PPR; 21	IRP; 32	NHA; 28	FLM; DNQ	NSV; 22	HPT; 19	LVL; 19	RCH; 24	MEM; 20	GTY; 12	MAR; 19	SON; 7	MMR; 17	PHO; 23	LVS; 16	23rd	2539	
1999	L&R Racing	90	Chevy	HOM; 14	PHO; 20	EVG; 18	MMR; 16	MAR; 35	MEM; 19	PPR; 19	I70; 18	BRI; 17	TEX; 16	PIR; 14	GLN; 9	MLW; 29	NSV; 29	NZH; 15	MCH	NHA	IRP		HPT; 23	RCH; 34	LVS; 17	LVL; 15	TEX; 15	CAL; 19			20th	2313	
1999	L&R Racing	90	Ford																			GTY; 14									20th	2313	
2000	L&R Racing	90	Chevy	DAY; 26	HOM; 31	PHO; 28	MMR; 11	MAR; 17	PIR; 28	GTY; 14	MEM; 36	PPR; 26	EVG; 20	TEX; 13	KEN; 11	GLN; 23	MLW; 7	NHA; 32	NZH; 12	MCH; 17	IRP; 18	NSV; 15	CIC; 16	RCH; 18	DOV; 31	TEX; 20	CAL; 27				16th	2430	
2001	L&R Racing	90	Chevy	DAY; 4	HOM; 13	MMR; 27	MAR; 27	GTY; 14	DAR; 20	PPR; 23	DOV; 17	TEX; 12	MEM; 8	MLW; 17	KAN; 11	KEN; 18	NHA; 16	IRP; 15	NSH; 9	CIC; 3	NZH; 21	RCH; 28	SBO; 13	TEX; 5	LVS; 14	PHO; 16	CAL; 27				11th	2820	
2002	L&R Racing	90	Chevy	DAY; 10	DAR; 13	MAR; 12	GTY; 9	PPR; 11	DOV; 36	TEX; 10	MEM; 14	MLW; 13	KAN; 22	KEN; 12	NHA; 18	MCH; 8	IRP; 7	NSH; 20	RCH; 22	TEX; 13	SBO; 15	LVS; 11	CAL; 16	PHO; 28	HOM; 21						13th	2574	

=== Rolex Sports Car Series ===
(key) Bold – Pole Position. (Overall Finish/Class Finish).

Grand-Am Rolex Sports Car Series GT results
Year	Team	No.	Chassis	1	2	3	4	5	6	7	8	9	10	11	12	Pos	Pts	Ref
2003	Morgan-Dollar Motorsports	46	Chevrolet Corvette	DAY (10/2)	HOM (11/4)	PHO	ALA	FON	WGL	MOH	DAY	WGL	CMT	VIR	DAY	18th	60	

==== 24 Hours of Daytona ====
(key)

24 Hours of Daytona results
Year	Class	No	Team	Car	Co-drivers	Laps	Position	Class Pos.	Ref
2003	GTS	46	(United States) Morgan-Dollar Motorsports	Chevrolet Corvette	(United States) Charles Morgan (United States) Rob Morgan (United States) Jim Pace	639	10	2	
