= Terry Cook (racing driver) =

American stock car racing driver

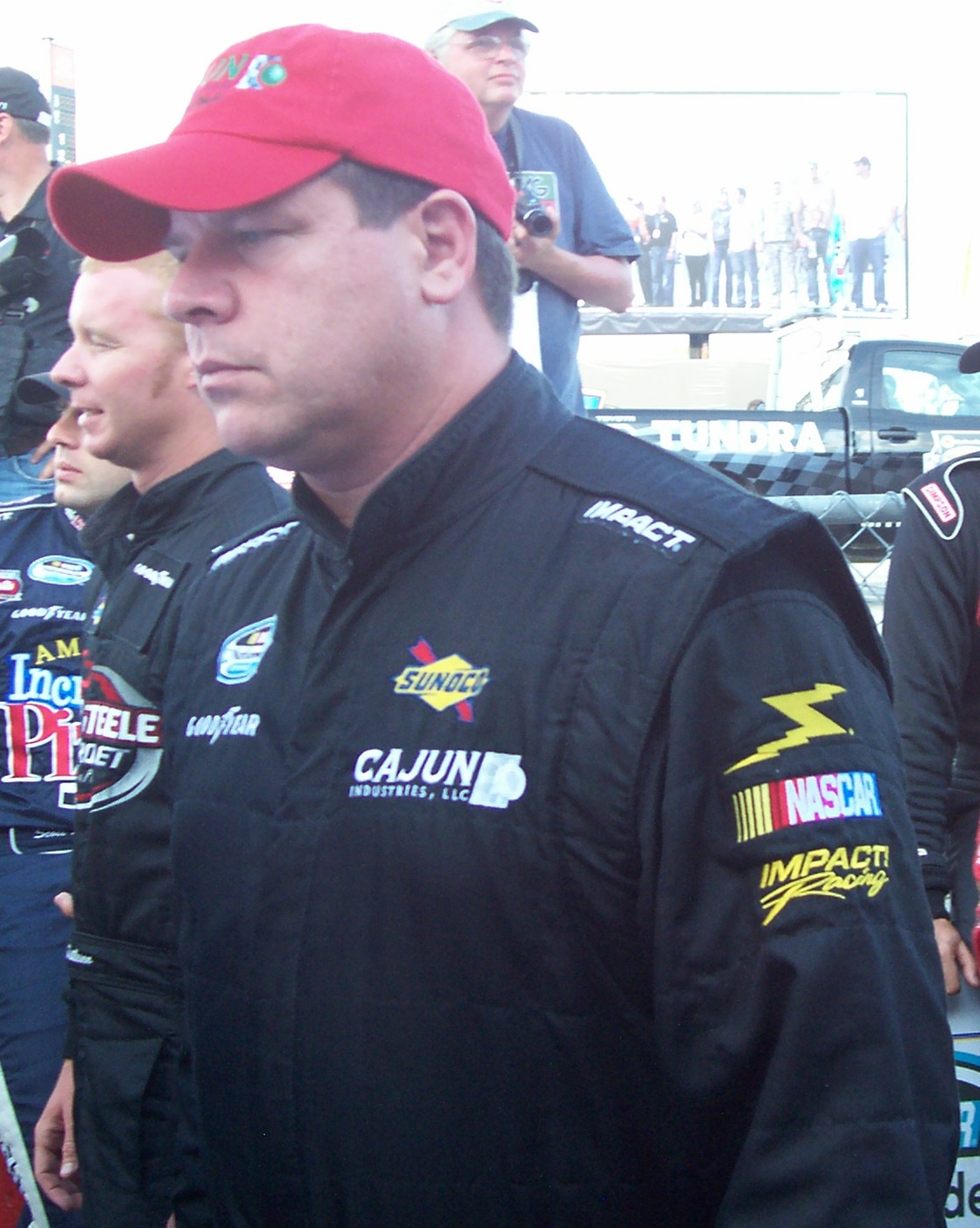
- Cook in 2009
- Born: February 26, 1968 (age 58); Sylvania, Ohio, U.S.
- Achievements: 1989 Flat Rock Speedway Track Champion 1990 Flat Rock Speedway Track Champion 1992 Toledo Speedway Track Champion 1995 Sandusky Speedway Track Champion Most consecutive Camping World Truck Series starts (298)

NASCAR Cup Series career
- 3 races run over 1 year
- Best finish: 59th (2010)
- First race: 2010 Food City 500 (Bristol)
- Last race: 2010 Crown Royal Presents the Heath Calhoun 400 (Richmond)
Wins	Top tens	Poles
0	0	0

NASCAR O'Reilly Auto Parts Series career
- 27 races run over 2 years
- 2009 position: 54th
- Best finish: 54th (2009)
- First race: 2008 Diamond Hill Plywood 200 (Darlington)
- Last race: 2009 Ford 300 (Homestead)
Wins	Top tens	Poles
0	0	0

NASCAR FedEx Freight Truck Series career
- 314 races run over 14 years
- 2009 position: 13th
- Best finish: 7th (2001)
- First race: 1996 Sears Auto Center 200 (Milwaukee)
- Last race: 2009 Lucas Oil 150 (Phoenix)
- First win: 1998 Stevens Beil / Genuine Car Parts 200 (Flemington)
- Last win: 2006 O'Reilly Auto Parts 250 (Kansas)
Wins	Top tens	Poles
6	112	8

ARCA Menards Series career
- 5 races run over 2 years
- Best finish: 50th (1989)
- First race: 1989 Big V Drug Stores 125 (Delaware)
- Last race: 1992 Metro 25 Tire Centers 150 (Flat Rock)
Wins	Top tens	Poles
0	1	0
- Statistics up to date as of February 3, 2012.

Terry Cook (born February 26, 1968) is an American former stock car racing driver, best known for his time in the NASCAR Craftsman Truck Series. He was married to former Craftsman Truck pit reporter Amy East, and brother-in-law to driver Bobby East. He was previously the spotter and driver coach for the late John Wes Townley and Athenian Motorsports, after serving as the competition director for Red Horse Racing.

== Early and personal life ==
Terry Cook is the son of Harold Cook, a former driver and mechanic, and Laureen Cook. He also has a brother Jerry (not to be confused with the NASCAR Hall of Famer of the same name), who competed in a single Truck Series race and seven ARCA Racing Series events. The two brothers worked on father Harold's car as teenagers.

Cook graduated from Sylvania Northview High School in 1986, two years after his brother.

== Racing career ==
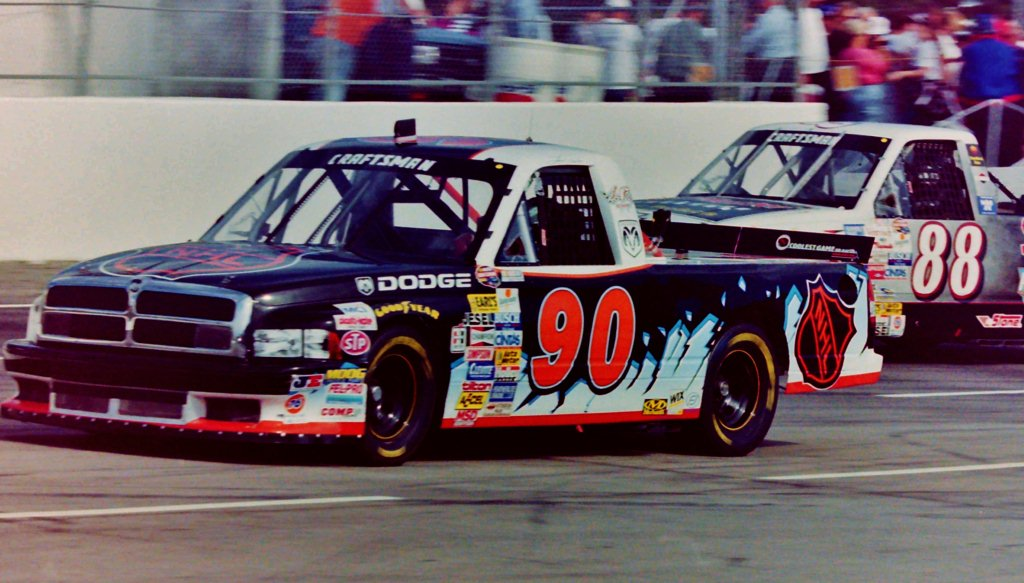
Cook's No. 88 truck (in the background) racing Lance Norick's No. 90 in 1998.

Cook began racing on a professional level in 1987 at Flat Rock Speedway and Toledo Speedway, collecting eleven wins in his first year of competition. Cook doubled his win total in 1988 before he moved up to super late models. He won the track championship in 1989 and 1990 at Flat Rock Speedway. Cook then went on to win the Super Late Model Championship at Toledo Speedway in 1992 and again at Sandusky Speedway in 1995.

Cook was set to make his NASCAR Craftsman Truck Series debut in 1995, but an injury at Toledo curtailed those plans. Cook made his Truck Series debut in 1996 at The Milwaukee Mile. Qualifying the No. 88 Sealmaster Racing (now ThorSport Racing) Chevrolet Silverado 24th, he finished 24th, three laps down. He ran two additional races that season for Sealmaster, finishing 23rd at Phoenix International Raceway. In 1997, Cook ran fifteen races during the season, with sponsorship from the PBA Tour. He won his first career pole at Flemington Speedway and posted a best finish of fifteenth twice.

Cook ran the full schedule in 1998. He won his first career race at Flemington and had six top-ten finishes, ending the season twentieth in the final points. Due to a lack of primary sponsorship in 1999, Cook only posted three top-ten finishes before Big Daddy's BBQ Sauce came on board towards the end of the season, when he finished fifteenth in the standings. In 2000, PickupTruck.com became the team's primary sponsor, and despite seven top-tens, Cook was released with one race to go for Matt Crafton. He drove for K Automotive Racing at the season finale, finishing seventh. He drove K Automotive's No. 29 Ford F-150 full-time in 2001, winning the pole at Nazareth Speedway and finishing a career-high seventh in points.

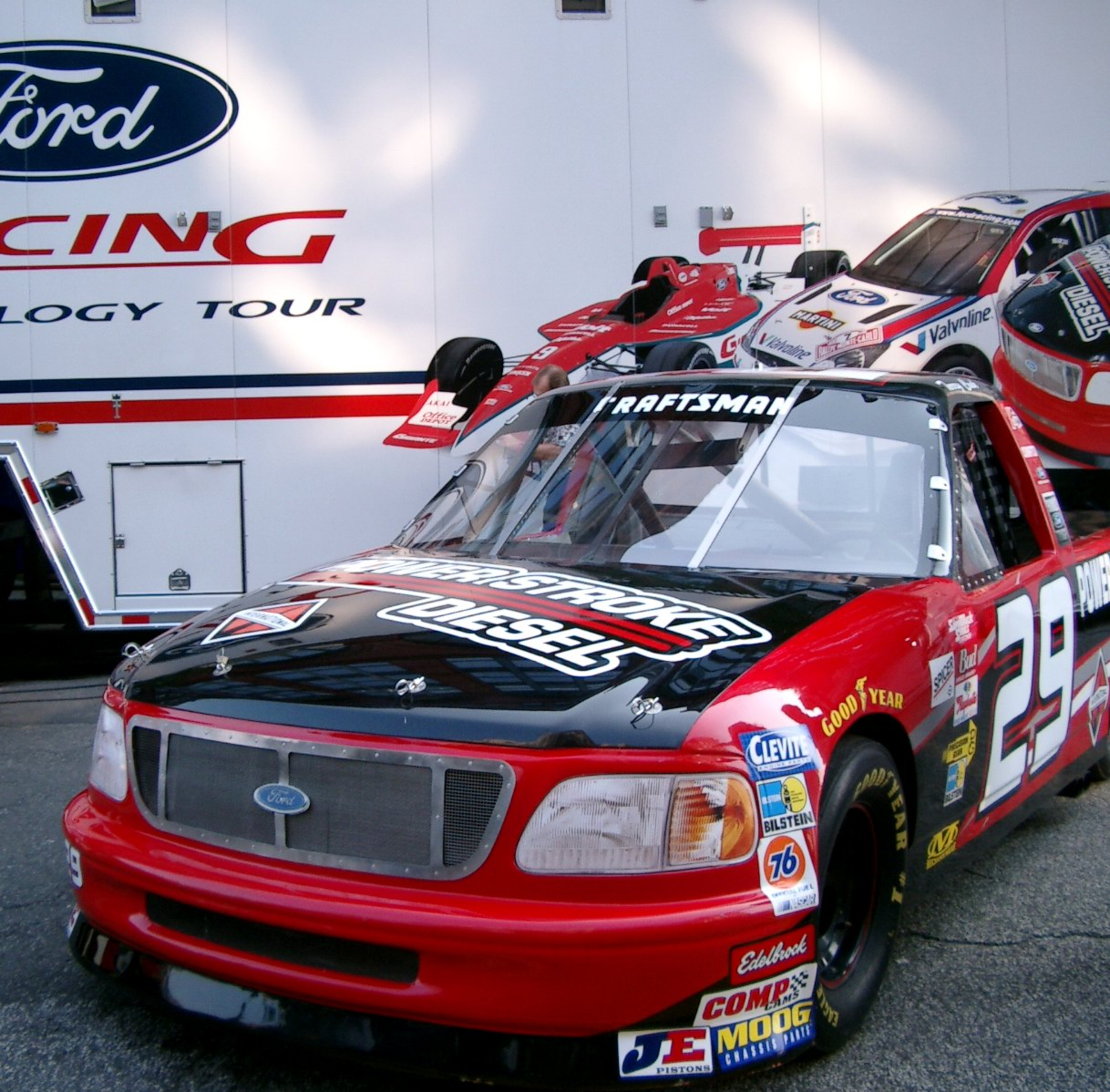
Cook's 2003 truck.

In 2002, Cook won a career best four races and two poles, but dropped to eighth in points. He won an additional two poles in 2003, but did not finish in the top-five all season. He joined ppc Racing's fledgling truck team in 2004. Despite winning the pole at the season-opening Florida Dodge Dealers 250, he dropped to sixteenth in the standings. He moved up one spot in points in 2005 after posting two top-fives.

In 2006, Cook grabbed a win at Kansas Speedway and finished eighth in points. With no sponsorship at ppc, he left the team after the 2006 season to replace Chad Chaffin at HT Motorsports. He had four top tens and finished fourteenth in points, but was released at the end of the season. He signed to drive for Wyler Racing in 2008 and had an additional seven top-tens but was released before the season was over in favor of Jack Sprague. He immediately rejoined HT Motorsports for the remainder of the season. At the end of 2008, HT renumbered his truck to the No. 25, and Cajun Industries and Harris Trucking shared sponsorship duties of the truck. With two races to go in the season, Cook was released from HT. He drove the next race in the No. 02 Koma Unwind Chevy for Corrie Stott Racing, but was unable to find a ride for the season-ending Ford 200, ending a streak of 296 consecutive races started in the Truck Series.

In addition to his Truck Series efforts, Cook made several starts for MSRP Motorsports (now Phil Parsons Racing) in the Nationwide Series. In 2008, Cook ran seven Nationwide races with MSRP, followed by twenty 2009 races, failed to qualify for three races. All of Cook's Nationwide starts were start-and-parks.

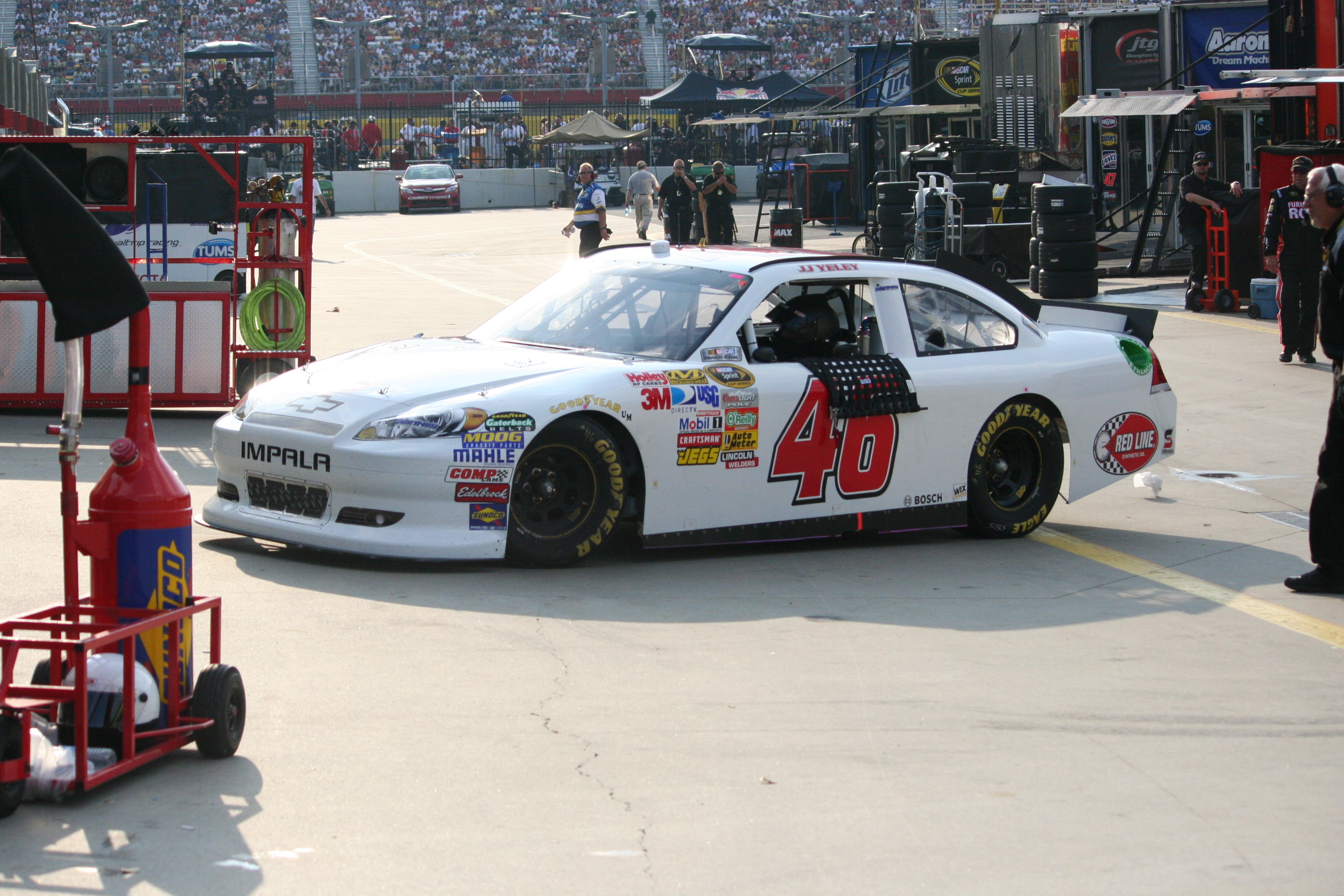
Cook started the 2010 season running for Rookie of the Year in the Cup Series in the Whitney Motorsports No. 46 car, shown here in 2011.

Cook was signed to drive the #46 Dodge in the Sprint Cup Series for the newly formed Whitney Motorsports in 2010. The cars were former Richard Petty Motorsports Dodges purchased after RPM's switch to Ford. Cook would run for Rookie of the Year against Kevin Conway. The team failed to make the first four races of 2010. Cook made a total of three starts in the No. 46 while failing to qualify for seven races. He parted ways with Whitney Motorsports after Richmond. He attempted one race with Phoenix Racing but failed to qualify. He then attempted Martinsville in the fall with Prism Motorsports, but he failed to qualify. As of 2026, he has not attempted and raced since.

In 2010, Cook was hired as a drivers coach for Truck Series team Red Horse Racing, assisting driver Justin Lofton. Cook became the team's competition director in 2011, serving that position until 2014. In 2015, he was hired by Truck and Xfinity Series team Athenian Motorsports, serving as a driver coach and spotter for drivers John Wes Townley and Dylan Lupton.

Cook remains a popular figure in the garage area and among fans.

== Motorsports career results ==
=== NASCAR ===
(key) (Bold – Pole position awarded by qualifying time. Italics – Pole position earned by points standings or practice time. * – Most laps led.)

==== Sprint Cup Series ====
NASCAR Sprint Cup Series results
Year	Team	No.	Make	1	2	3	4	5	6	7	8	9	10	11	12	13	14	15	16	17	18	19	20	21	22	23	24	25	26	27	28	29	30	31	32	33	34	35	36	NSCC	Pts	Ref
2010	Whitney Motorsports	46	Dodge	DAY; DNQ	CAL; DNQ	LVS; DNQ	ATL; DNQ	BRI; 37	MAR; DNQ	PHO; 34	TEX; DNQ	TAL; DNQ	RCH; 39	DAR	DOV	CLT																								59th	164	
2010	Phoenix Racing	09	Chevy														POC; DNQ	MCH	SON	NHA	DAY	CHI	IND	POC	GLN	MCH	BRI	ATL	RCH	NHA	DOV	KAN	CAL	CLT						59th	164	
2010	Prism Motorsports	55	Toyota																																MAR; DNQ	TAL	TEX	PHO	HOM	59th	164	

===== Daytona 500 =====
Year	Team	Manufacturer	Start	Finish
2010	Whitney Motorsports	Dodge	DNQ	

==== Nationwide Series ====
NASCAR Nationwide Series results
Year	Team	No.	Make	1	2	3	4	5	6	7	8	9	10	11	12	13	14	15	16	17	18	19	20	21	22	23	24	25	26	27	28	29	30	31	32	33	34	35	NNSC	Pts	Ref
2008	MSRP Motorsports	91	Chevy	DAY	CAL	LVS	ATL	BRI	NSH	TEX	PHO	MXC	TAL	RCH	DAR; 41	CLT	DOV; 41	NSH	KEN	MLW; 41	NHA	DAY	CHI	GTY	IRP; 43	CGV	GLN	MCH	BRI	CAL	RCH	DOV	KAN	CLT; 42	MEM	TEX			80th	271	
2008	MSRP Motorsports	90	Chevy																																		PHO; 40	HOM; 42	80th	271	
2009	MSRP Motorsports	91	Chevy	DAY; DNQ	CAL; 37	LVS; 41	BRI; 40	TEX; 42	NSH; 42	PHO; 42	TAL	RCH; 41	DAR; 41	CLT; 40	DOV; 41	NSH	KEN	MLW; 39	NHA	DAY; DNQ	CHI; 41	GTY	IRP; 40	IOW	GLN	MCH; 38	BRI; 42	CGV	ATL	RCH	DOV	KAN; 41	CAL; 41	CLT; DNQ	MEM	TEX; 41	PHO; 39	HOM; 40	54th	833	

==== Camping World Truck Series ====
NASCAR Camping World Truck Series results
Year	Team	No.	Make	1	2	3	4	5	6	7	8	9	10	11	12	13	14	15	16	17	18	19	20	21	22	23	24	25	26	27	NCWTC	Pts	Ref
1996	SealMaster Racing	88	Chevy	HOM	PHO	POR	EVG	TUS	CNS	HPT	BRI	NZH	MLW; 12	LVL	I70	IRP; DNQ	FLM	GLN	NSV; 25	RCH	NHA	MAR	NWS	SON	MMR	PHO; 21	LVS; DNQ				51st	371	
1997	SealMaster Racing	88	Chevy	WDW; DNQ	TUS; DNQ	HOM; DNQ	PHO; 19	POR	EVG	I70; 23	NHA; 25	TEX; 33	BRI; 27	NZH; 15	MLW; 27	LVL; 15	CNS; 19	HPT; 24	IRP; 24	**FLM**; 18	NSV; 33	GLN; DNQ	RCH; DNQ	MAR; DNQ	SON	MMR	CAL; 23	PHO; 28	LVS; DNQ		24th	1651	
1998	SealMaster Racing	88	Chevy	WDW; 21	HOM; 38	PHO; 16	POR; 31	EVG; 29	I70; 20	GLN; 24	TEX; 10	BRI; 14	MLW; 32	NZH; 34	CAL; 19	PPR; 23	IRP; 20	NHA; 12	FLM; 1	NSV; 25	HPT; 2	**LVL**; 5	RCH; 9	MEM; 8	GTY; 22	MAR; 22	SON; 30	MMR; 11	PHO; 22	LVS; 34	20th	2845	
1999	SealMaster Racing	88	Chevy	HOM; 19	PHO; 19	EVG; 26	MMR; 15	MAR; 25	MEM; 13	PPR; 17	I70; 12	BRI; 15	TEX; 22	PIR; 4	GLN; 12	MLW; 16	NSV; 20	NZH; 14	MCH; 13	NHA; 12	IRP; 17	GTY; 15	HPT; 19	RCH; 24	LVS; 10	LVL; 23	TEX; 6	CAL; 31			15th	2838	
2000	SealMaster Racing	88	Chevy	DAY; 4	HOM; 8	PHO; 14	MMR; 7	MAR; 30	PIR; 22	GTY; 9	MEM; 31	PPR; 17	EVG; 13	TEX; 19	KEN; 35	GLN; 11	MLW; 21	NHA; 17	NZH; 6	MCH; 9	IRP; 28	NSV; 11	CIC; 8	RCH; 30	DOV; 14	TEX; 17					14th	2805	
2000	K Automotive Racing	29	Dodge																								CAL; 7				14th	2805	
2001	K Automotive Racing	29	Ford	DAY; 6	HOM; 10	MMR; 7	MAR; 3	GTY; 3	DAR; 7	PPR; 11	DOV; 11	TEX; 13	MEM; 25	MLW; 4	KAN; 20	KEN; 9	NHA; 6	IRP; 2	NSH; 6	CIC; 6	**NZH**; 2	RCH; 31	SBO; 7	TEX; 22	LVS; 13	PHO; 7	CAL; 6				7th	3327	
2002	K Automotive Racing	29	Ford	DAY; 6	DAR; 29	MAR; 5	GTY; 1*	PPR; 4	DOV; 10	TEX; 13	MEM; 2	**MLW**; 1*	KAN; 6	KEN; 6	NHA; 1	MCH; 6	**IRP**; 1*	NSH; 7	RCH; 5	TEX; 22	SBO; 25	LVS; 27	CAL; 10	PHO; 5	HOM; 10						8th	3070	
2003	K Automotive Racing	29	Ford	DAY; 9	DAR; 8	MMR; 10	MAR; 9	CLT; 14	DOV; 20	TEX; 9	MEM; 9	**MLW**; 7	KAN; 12	KEN; 9	GTW; 9	MCH; 9	**IRP**; 9	NSH; 14	BRI; 27	RCH; 16	NHA; 15	CAL; 12	LVS; 7	SBO; 18	TEX; 7	MAR; 19	PHO; 16	HOM; 11			9th	3212	
2004	ppc Racing	10	Ford	**DAY**; 5	ATL; 18	MAR; 22	MFD; 3	CLT; 14	DOV; 20	TEX; 24	MEM; 27	MLW; 7	KAN; 10	KEN; 30	GTW; 26	MCH; 7	IRP; 14	NSH; 16	BRI; 24	RCH; 9	NHA; 35	LVS; 9	CAL; 19	TEX; 32	MAR; 13	PHO; 14	DAR; 12	HOM; 25			16th	2821	
2005	ppc Racing	10	Ford	DAY; 20	CAL; 15	ATL; 9	MAR; 10	GTY; 23	MFD; 31	CLT; 2	DOV; 3	TEX; 7	MCH; 13	MLW; 10	KAN; 7	KEN; 25*	MEM; 15	IRP; 12	NSH; 32	BRI; 30	RCH; 19	NHA; 16	LVS; 18	MAR; 7	ATL; 16	TEX; 12	PHO; 25	HOM; 26			15th	2936	
2006	ppc Racing	10	Ford	DAY; 10	CAL; 14	ATL; 12	MAR; 19	GTY; 6	CLT; 2	MFD; 22	DOV; 16	TEX; 16	MCH; 9	MLW; 10	KAN; 1	KEN; 16	MEM; 8	IRP; 6	NSH; 10	BRI; 21	NHA; 22	LVS; 16	TAL; 14	MAR; 17	ATL; 2	TEX; 8	PHO; 14	HOM; 10			8th	3268	
2007	HT Motorsports	59	Toyota	DAY; 27	CAL; 30	ATL; 17	MAR; 15	KAN; 9	CLT; 16	MFD; 12	DOV; 8	TEX; 12	MCH; 11	MLW; 13	MEM; 29	KEN; 31	IRP; 26	NSH; 18	BRI; 32	GTW; 30	NHA; 18	LVS; 4	TAL; 28	MAR; 29*	ATL; 10	TEX; 12	PHO; 21				14th	2568	
2007	HT Motorsports	92	Toyota																									HOM; 20			14th	2568	
2008	Wyler Racing	60	Toyota	DAY; 30	CAL; 4	ATL; 8	MAR; 13	KAN; 19	CLT; 6	MFD; 4	DOV; 13	TEX; 16	MCH; 10	MLW; 9	MEM; 17	KEN; 8	IRP; 11	NSH; 12	BRI; 23	GTW; 17	NHA; 18	LVS; 23	TAL; 23								10th	3072	
2008	HT Motorsports	59	Toyota																					MAR; 16	ATL; 28	TEX; 6	PHO; 11	HOM; 9			10th	3072	
2009	HT Motorsports	25	Toyota	DAY; 3	CAL; 25	ATL; 5	MAR; 16	KAN; 20	CLT; 5	DOV; 10	TEX; 20	MCH; 10	MLW; 10	MEM; 13	KEN; 15	IRP; 13	NSH; 19	BRI; 15	CHI; 10	IOW; 11	GTW; 21	NHA; 16	LVS; 26	MAR; 10	TAL; 4	TEX; 24					13th	2890	
2009	Corrie Stott Racing	02	Chevy																								PHO; 36	HOM			13th	2890	

=== ARCA SuperCar Series ===
(key) (Bold – Pole position awarded by qualifying time. Italics – Pole position earned by points standings or practice time. * – Most laps led.)

ARCA SuperCar Series results
Year	Team	No.	Make	1	2	3	4	5	6	7	8	9	10	11	12	13	14	15	16	17	18	19	20	21	ASCC	Pts	Ref
1989		41	Pontiac	DAY	ATL	KIL	TAL	FRS	POC	KIL	HAG	POC	TAL	DEL; 25	FRS; 22	ISF	TOL; 12	DSF							50th	-	
1989		41	Chevy																SLM; 7	ATL					50th	-	
1992	Gall Racing	6	Chevy	DAY	FIF	TWS	TAL	TOL	KIL	POC	MCH	FRS; 12	KIL	NSH	DEL	POC	HPT	FRS	ISF	TOL	DSF	TWS	SLM	ATL	116th	-	
