= Blake Bainbridge =

American racing driver and crew chief

- Born: July 24, 1979 (age 47); Hueytown, Alabama, U.S.

NASCAR FedEx Freight Truck Series career
- 3 races run over 1 year
- Best finish: 58th (1998)
- First race: 1998 Cummins 200 (Indianapolis)
- Last race: 1998 Sam's Town 250 (Las Vegas)
Wins	Top tens	Poles
0	0	0
- Statistics up to date as of December 17, 2024.

Blake Bainbridge (born July 24, 1979) is an American former professional stock car racing driver and crew chief who works for SPS Racing as the crew chief of their No. 24 Chevrolet SS/Ford Mustang in the ARCA Menards Series, driven by multiple drivers. He previously worked as a crew chief for teams such as McAnally–Hilgemann Racing, GMS Racing, Halmar Friesen Racing, DGR-Crosley, and Rusty Wallace Racing.

Bainbridge has also previously competed in three races in the Truck Series in 1998, and in the Allison Legacy Series, where he won the championship in 1997.

== Motorsports results ==
=== NASCAR ===
(key) (Bold - Pole position awarded by qualifying time. Italics - Pole position earned by points standings or practice time. * – Most laps led.)

==== Craftsman Truck Series ====
NASCAR Craftsman Truck Series results
Year	Team	No.	Make	1	2	3	4	5	6	7	8	9	10	11	12	13	14	15	16	17	18	19	20	21	22	23	24	25	26	27	NCTC	Pts	Ref
1998	Wilber Bunce	9	Chevy	WDW	HOM	PHO	POR	EVG	I70	GLN	TEX	BRI	MLW	NZH	CAL	PPR	IRP; 30	NHA	FLM	NSV; 34	HPT	LVL	RCH; DNQ	MEM	GTY	MAR	SON	MMR	PHO		58th	238	
1998	Xpress Motorsports	61	Chevy																											LVS; 33	58th	238	
