= Mike Ewanitsko =

American racing driver

- Born: April 11, 1967 (age 59); North Babylon, New York, U.S.

NASCAR FedEx Freight Truck Series career
- 2 races run over 2 years
- Best finish: 81st (1998)
- First race: 1997 Parts America 150 (Watkins Glen)
- Last race: 1998 Pennzoil / VIP Auto Discount Tripleheader (New Hampshire)
Wins	Top tens	Poles
0	0	0
- Statistics up to date as of October 10, 2024.

Mike Ewanitsko (born April 11, 1967) is an American former professional stock car racing driver who competed in the NASCAR Craftsman Truck Series and the NASCAR Whelen Modified Tour.

Ewanitsko made two starts in the NASCAR Craftsman Truck Series whilst driving for Long Island Motorsports, finishing 21st at Watkins Glen International in 1997, and 35th at New Hampshire Motor Speedway in 1998.

Ewanitsko found the majority of his success in the NASCAR Whelen Modified Tour, where he scored 28 wins and 21 pole positions, and finished runner-up in the standings in 1998 and 1999.

Ewanitsko is a diabetic, a condition he has suffered in the age of twelve. He started having problems with his vision during the 2000 Modified Tour season, having developed cataracts in each eye. He eventually stepped away from full-time competition due to this at the conclusion of the 2001 season. Ewanitsko then underwent surgery to repair the cataracts a few years after, and made a brief return to the series in 2005, where he finished fourth at New Hampshire Motor Speedway whilst driving a car for Eddie Whelan. After finishing 32nd at the season finale at Thompson Speedway, he fully retired from competition due to complications from his diabetes.

== Motorsports results ==
=== NASCAR ===
(key) (Bold – Pole position awarded by qualifying time. Italics – Pole position earned by points standings or practice time. * – Most laps led.)

==== Craftsman Truck Series ====
NASCAR Craftsman Truck Series results
Year	Team	No.	Make	1	2	3	4	5	6	7	8	9	10	11	12	13	14	15	16	17	18	19	20	21	22	23	24	25	26	27	NCTC	Pts	Ref
1997	Long Island Motorsports	42	Chevy	WDW	TUS	HOM	PHO	POR	EVG	I70	NHA	TEX	BRI	NZH	MLW	LVL	CNS	HPT	IRP	FLM	NSV	GLN; 21	RCH; DNQ	MAR; DNQ	SON	MMR	CAL	PHO	LVS		96th	141	
1998	Long Island Motorsports	40	Chevy	WDW	HOM	PHO	POR	EVG	I70	GLN; DNQ	TEX	BRI	MLW	NZH	CAL	PPR	IRP	NHA; 35	FLM	NSV	HPT	LVL									81st	138	
1998	Long Island Motorsports	42	Chevy																				RCH; DNQ	MEM	GTY	MAR	SON	MMR	PHO	LVS	81st	138	

==== Busch North Series ====
NASCAR Busch North Series results
Year	Team	No.	Make	1	2	3	4	5	6	7	8	9	10	11	12	13	14	15	16	17	18	19	20	NBNSC	Pts	Ref
1999	N/A	27	N/A	LEE	RPS	NHA	TMP	NZH	HOL	BEE	JEN	GLN	STA	NHA	NZH	STA	NHA	GLN	EPP	THU	BEE	NHA; DNQ	LRP	N/A	0	
