= Billy Pauch =

American racing driver

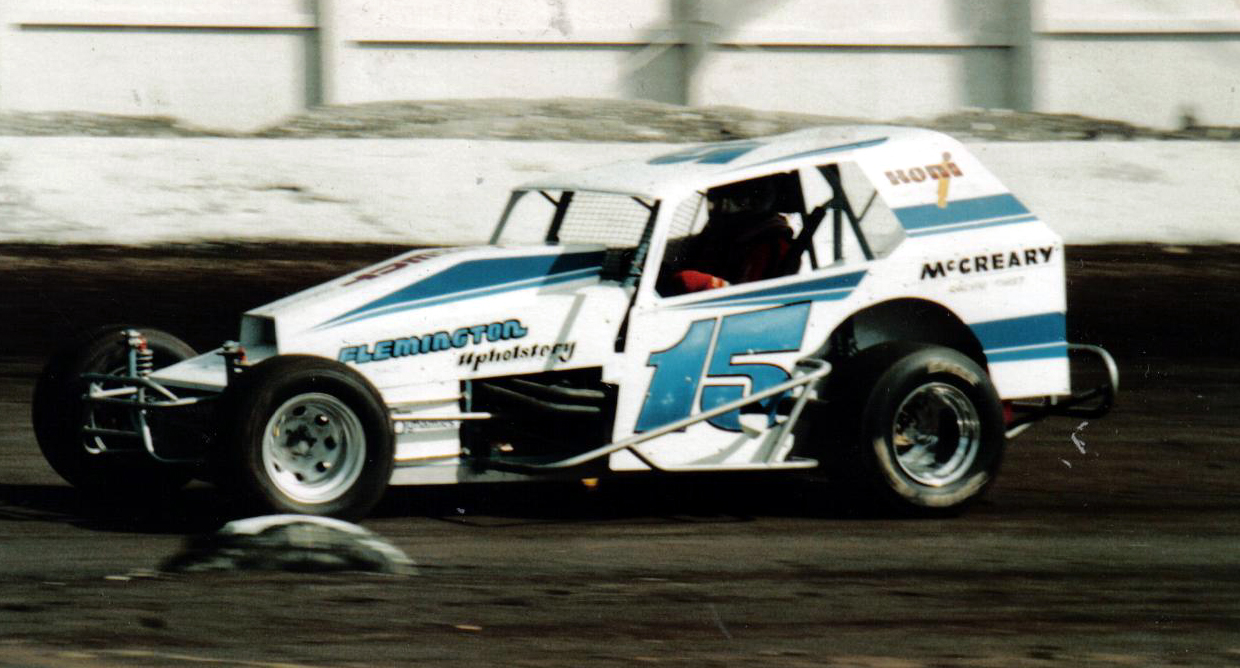
- #15 dirt Modified car
- Born: March 1, 1957 (age 69) Frenchtown, New Jersey, U.S.

Modified racing career
- Debut season: 1975
- Car number: 1, 5, R7, 15, 76, 121, 126
- Championships: 26
- Wins: 749

Previous series
- 1985-present Wins Championships 1985-1992 Wins: Sprint car & SpeedSTR; 85; 2 Late model 2

Championship titles
- 2011 American Racer Cup

Awards
- 2016 Northeast Dirt Modified Hall of Fame; 1987, 1992 EMPA Al Holbert National Driver of the Year
- Achievements: 1988, 1991, 1992, 1996, 1998, 2000 Freedom 76; 1998 Sprint Car Nationals Open; 1986, 1987, 1988, 1989, 1990, 1997 Victoria 200; 1980 (Small block), 1994 (Sprint car) Super Dirt Week; 1993 Race of Champions

NASCAR FedEx Freight Truck Series career
- 4 races run over 2 years
- Best finish: 46th (1997)
- First race: 1997 NAPA Autocare 200 (Nazareth Speedway)
- Last race: 1998 Stevens Beil/Genuine Parts 200 (Flemington Speedway)
| Wins | Top tens | Poles |
|---|---|---|
| 0 | 1 | 0 |
- Statistics up to date as of September 10, 2024.

Billy Pauch (/paʊtʃ/ POWCH; born March 1, 1957, in Doylestown, Pennsylvania, U.S.) is an American racecar driver. He resides in Frenchtown, New Jersey, where he runs the Bill Pauch Driving School.

== Racing career ==
Known for racing Modifieds, dirt small-block and big-block Modifieds, and dirt sprint cars throughout the eastern United States, Pauch had over 600 career feature wins. Pauch was the 1999, 2000, 2002, 2008, 2011, and 2013 New Egypt Speedway Modified division champion claiming over 100 wins at the track (the second place only has 29), among many other track championships. Pauch has also made four NASCAR Craftsman Truck Series starts, with his best finish coming in 1998 at Flemington Speedway where he finished in sixth place in the No. 06 Dick Greenfield Dodge. In 1988, Pauch won 42 feature races and earned three track championships. He is still racing in weekly races in New Jersey as of June 2024.

== Personal life ==
Pauch attended Hunterdon Central Regional High School, which was located near the Flemington Speedway. At the time, drivers couldn't race in New Jersey until they were 18, so Pauch started on Pennsylvania tracks. But each day he went to school he saw the Flemington track a few hundred yards away, and it became his home track for the next couple of decades.

Pauch's daughter Mandee Pauch Mahaney was honored as the 2024 Outstanding Woman in Racing by the Northeast Dirt Modified Hall of Fame for her work as a content creator and media personality. Building on her experiences authoring a magazine column, writing a blog, and TV pit reporting, Paunch Mahaney launched her YouTube channel, “Dirt Track Untold” in 2017.

Pauch's son Billy Pauch Jr. raced the Whelen Modified Tour and ARCA Menards Series, and now competes regularly with the Super DIRTcar Series.

== Motorsports career results ==
=== NASCAR ===
(key) (Bold – Pole position awarded by qualifying time. Italics – Pole position earned by points standings or practice time. * – Most laps led.)

==== Craftsman Truck Series ====
NASCAR Craftsman Truck Series results
| Year | Team | No. | Make | 1 | 2 | 3 | 4 | 5 | 6 | 7 | 8 | 9 | 10 | 11 | 12 | 13 | 14 | 15 | 16 | 17 | 18 | 19 | 20 | 21 | 22 | 23 | 24 | 25 | 26 | 27 | NCTC | Pts | Ref |
|---|---|---|---|---|---|---|---|---|---|---|---|---|---|---|---|---|---|---|---|---|---|---|---|---|---|---|---|---|---|---|---|---|---|
| 1997 | Greenfield Racing | 06 | Dodge | WDW | TUS | HOM | PHO | POR | EVG | I70 | NHA | TEX | BRI | NZH; 21 | MLW | LVL; DNQ | CNS | HPT | IRP | FLM; DNQ | NSV | GLN | RCH; 20 | MAR; 25 | SON | MMR | CAL | PHO; DNQ | LVS | | 46th | 441 | |
| 1998 | Greenfield Racing | 06 | Dodge | WDW; DNQ | HOM | PHO | POR | EVG | I70 | GLN | TEX | BRI | MLW | NZH | CAL | PPR | IRP | NHA | FLM; 6 | NSV | HPT | LVL | RCH; DNQ | MEM | GTY | MAR | SON | MMR | PHO | LVS | 68th | 191 | |

==== Winston Modified Tour ====
NASCAR Winston Modified Tour results
| Year | Car owner | No. | Make | 1 | 2 | 3 | 4 | 5 | 6 | 7 | 8 | 9 | 10 | 11 | 12 | 13 | 14 | 15 | 16 | 17 | 18 | 19 | 20 | 21 | 22 | 23 | 24 | 25 | NWMTC | Pts | Ref |
|---|---|---|---|---|---|---|---|---|---|---|---|---|---|---|---|---|---|---|---|---|---|---|---|---|---|---|---|---|---|---|---|
| 1986 | | 05 | | ROU | MAR | STA | TMP | MAR | NEG | MND | EPP | NEG | WFD | SPE | RIV | NEG | TMP | RIV | TMP | RIV | STA | TMP | POC; 17 | TIO | OXF | STA | TMP | MAR | NA | - | |
| 1996 | | 15 | Chevy | TMP | STA | NZH; 29 | STA | NHA | JEN | RIV | LEE | RPS | HOL | TMP | RIV | NHA | GLN | STA | NHA | NHA | STA | FLE; 25 | TMP | | | | | | NA | - | |

== Gallery ==
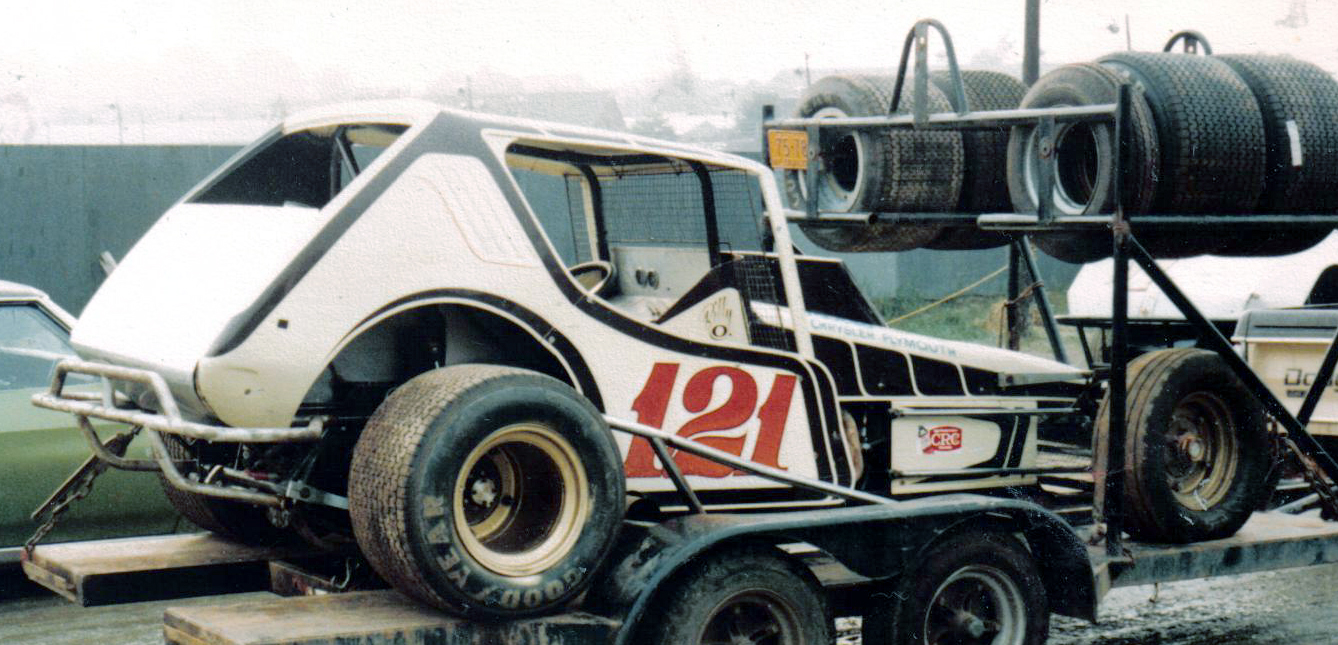
1979 dirt Modified car
