= Lonnie Rush Jr. =

American racing driver

- Born: August 11, 1966 (age 60); Pickerington, Ohio, U.S.

NASCAR O'Reilly Auto Parts Series career
- 11 races run over 3 years
- Best finish: 48th (1992)
- First race: 1991 Spring 200 (Volusia)
- Last race: 1996 Busch Light 300 (Atlanta)
Wins	Top tens	Poles
0	1	0

NASCAR FedEx Freight Truck Series career
- 55 races run over 4 years
- Best finish: 24th (1998, 1999)
- First race: 1997 Chevy Trucks Challenge (Walt Disney)
- Last race: 2000 Chevy Trucks NASCAR 150 (Phoenix)
Wins	Top tens	Poles
0	2	0

Lonnie Rush Jr. (born August 11, 1966) is an American professional stock car racing driver. He has raced in the NASCAR Busch Series and the NASCAR Craftsman Truck Series.

== Personal life ==
Rush graduated at Ohio State University in 1989. The university sponsored him in a few NASCAR Truck Series races.

== Motorsports career results ==
=== NASCAR ===
(key) (Bold – Pole position awarded by qualifying time. Italics – Pole position earned by points standings or practice time. * – Most laps led.)

==== Busch Series ====
NASCAR Busch Series results
Year	Team	No.	Make	1	2	3	4	5	6	7	8	9	10	11	12	13	14	15	16	17	18	19	20	21	22	23	24	25	26	27	28	29	30	31	NBGNC	Pts	Ref
1991	Skillman Motorsports	85	Pontiac	DAY	RCH	CAR	MAR	VOL; 11	HCY	DAR	BRI	LAN; 24	SBO	NZH	CLT	DOV	ROU	HCY	MYB	GLN	OXF	NHA	SBO	DUB	IRP; 16	ROU	BRI	DAR	RCH	DOV	CLT	NHA			55th	400	
1991	Skillman Motorsports	58	Pontiac																														CAR; 33	MAR	55th	400	
1992	Trinity Motorsports	90	Pontiac	DAY	CAR	RCH	ATL	MAR	DAR	BRI	HCY	LAN	DUB; 14	NZH	CLT	DOV	ROU	MYB	GLN	VOL	NHA	TAL	IRP	ROU	MCH; 29	NHA	BRI; 4	DAR	RCH; 13	DOV				HCY; 30	48th	554	
1992	Info not available		Chevy																												CLT; DNQ	MAR	CAR		48th	554	
1996	Bill Elliott Racing	94	Ford	DAY; 38	CAR	RCH	ATL; 40	NSV	DAR; DNQ	BRI	HCY	NZH	CLT	DOV	SBO	MYB	GLN	MLW	NHA	TAL	IRP	MCH	BRI	DAR	RCH	DOV	CLT	CAR	HOM						86th	92	

==== Craftsman Truck Series ====
NASCAR Craftsman Truck Series results
Year	Team	No.	Make	1	2	3	4	5	6	7	8	9	10	11	12	13	14	15	16	17	18	19	20	21	22	23	24	25	26	27	NCTC	Pts	Ref
1997	Charles Hardy Racing	35	Chevy	WDW; 13	TUS; 17																										32nd	1087	
1997	Ken Schrader Racing	53	Chevy			HOM; 38																									32nd	1087	
1997	Doran Racing	77	Chevy				PHO; 25	POR; 31	EVG; DNQ	I70; 19	NHA; 28	TEX	BRI; 24	NZH; 32	MLW; 18	LVL	CNS	HPT	IRP	FLM	NSV	GLN	RCH	MAR	SON	MMR	CAL				32nd	1087	
1997	Rush Warthon Racing	10	Chevy																									PHO; 29	LVS; 35		32nd	1087	
1998	Rush Warthon Racing	10	Chevy	WDW; 33	HOM; 32	PHO; 26	POR; 20	EVG; 11	I70; 27	GLN; DNQ	TEX; 31	BRI; 11	MLW; 27	NZH; 23	CAL; 29	PPR; 20	IRP; 5	NHA; 13	FLM; 27		HPT; 33	LVL; 16	RCH; 18	MEM; 11	GTY; 24	MAR; 27	SON	MMR	PHO; 36	LVS; 18	24th	2333	
1998	Spears Motorsports	75	Chevy																	NSV; 27											24th	2333	
1999	Spears Motorsports	75	Chevy	HOM; 24	PHO; 12	EVG; 17	MMR; 20	MAR; 28	MEM; 33																						24th	1408	
1999	CJ Racing	17	Ford							PPR; 31				PIR; 32																	24th	1408	
1999	CJ Racing	27	Ford								I70; 28	BRI; 8	TEX; 30		GLN; 26	MLW; 34	NSV; 30	NZH	MCH	NHA	IRP	GTY	HPT	RCH; 26	LVS	LVL	TEX				24th	1408	
1999	Lonely Racing	7	Chevy																									CAL; 27			24th	1408	
2000	CJ Racing	27	Ford	DAY; 25	HOM; 16																										66th	258	
2000	CJ Racing	27	Chevy			PHO; 36	MMR	MAR	PIR	GTY	MEM	PPR	EVG	TEX	KEN	GLN	MLW	NHA	NZH	MCH	IRP	NSV	CIC	RCH	DOV	TEX	CAL				66th	258	

==== Busch North Series ====
NASCAR Busch North Series results
Year	Team	No.	Make	1	2	3	4	5	6	7	8	9	10	11	12	13	14	15	16	17	18	19	20	NBNSC	Pts	Ref
1992	Trinity Motorsports	90	Pontiac	DAY	CAR	RCH	NHA	NZH	MND	OXF	DOV	LEE	JEN; 3	OXF	NHA	OXF	HOL	EPP	NHA	RPS	OXF	NHA; 35	EPP	48th	223	
