= Rob Morgan (racing driver) =

American racing driver (born 1973)

- Born: Robert Morgan; November 11, 1973 (age 52); Conway, Arkansas, U.S.
- Relatives: Charles Morgan (father)

NASCAR FedEx Freight Truck Series career
- 61 races run over 5 years
- 2001 position: 102nd
- Best finish: 18th (2000)
- First race: 1997 Lund Look 275K (Topeka)
- Last race: 2001 Florida Dodge Dealers 400K (Homestead)
Wins	Top tens	Poles
0	2	0
- Statistics up to date as of July 22, 2020.

Robert Morgan (born November 11, 1973) is an American former professional stock car racing driver and team owner. He currently owns the GT Celebration Race Series, a road racing series. He formerly competed in the NASCAR Craftsman Truck Series as a driver from 1997 to 2001. In 1998, Morgan became a co-owner of Morgan-Dollar Motorsports along with David Dollar. He was involved in a collision during the Daytona 250 in 2000 that almost took driver Geoff Bodine's life.

== Motorsports career results ==
=== NASCAR ===
(key) (Bold – Pole position awarded by qualifying time. Italics – Pole position earned by points standings or practice time. * – Most laps led.)

==== Craftsman Truck Series ====
NASCAR Craftsman Truck Series results
Year	Team	No.	Make	1	2	3	4	5	6	7	8	9	10	11	12	13	14	15	16	17	18	19	20	21	22	23	24	25	26	27	NCTC	Pts	Ref
1997	AAG Racing	65	Ford	WDW	TUS	HOM	PHO	POR	EVG	I70	NHA	TEX	BRI	NZH	MLW	LVL	CNS	HPT; 21	IRP	FLM	NSV										59th	326	
1997	Doran Racing	71	Chevy																			GLN; 18	RCH	MAR							59th	326	
1997	Doran Racing	77	Chevy																						SON; 30	MMR	CAL	PHO; DNQ			59th	326	
1997	Billy Ballew Motorsports	15	Ford																										LVS; DNQ		59th	326	
1998	CSG Motorsports	57	Ford	WDW; DNQ							TEX; 20	BRI; DNQ	MLW; 30	NZH; 35	CAL	PPR; 26	IRP	NHA	FLM	NSV											37th	711	
1998	Billy Ballew Motorsports	15	Ford		HOM; DNQ	PHO; 27	POR	EVG	I70	GLN; 32																					37th	711	
1998	Morgan-Dollar Motorsports	46	Ford																		HPT; 28	LVL	RCH	MEM	GTY	MAR	SON; 26	MMR	PHO	LVS; DNQ	37th	711	
1999	Morgan-Dollar Motorsports	46	Ford	HOM; 26	PHO; 33	EVG; 25	MMR; 28	MAR; 21	MEM; 16	PPR; 25	I70; 22	BRI; 26	TEX; 19	PIR; 26	GLN; 16	MLW; 22	NSV; 16	NZH; 18	MCH; 18	NHA; 24	IRP; 22	GTY; 26	HPT; 5	RCH; 28	LVS; 25	LVL; 22	TEX; 18	CAL; 16			19th	2458	
2000	Morgan-Dollar Motorsports	46	Ford	DAY; 23	HOM; 35	PHO; 12	MMR; 15	MAR; 21	PIR; 27	GTY; 19	MEM; 22	PPR; 28	EVG; 27	TEX; 29	KEN; 8	GLN; 26	MLW; 18	NHA; 23	NZH; 16	MCH; 18	IRP; 33	NSV; 17	CIC; 23	RCH; 20	DOV; 20	TEX; 31	CAL; 13				18th	2353	
2001	MacDonald Motorsports	72	Chevy	DAY	HOM; 27	MMR	MAR	GTY	DAR	PPR	DOV	TEX	MEM	MLW	KAN	KEN	NHA	IRP	NSH	CIC	NZH	RCH	SBO	TEX	LVS	PHO	CAL				102nd	82	

==== Winston West Series ====
NASCAR Winston West Series results
Year	Team	No.	Make	1	2	3	4	5	6	7	8	9	10	11	12	13	14	NWWSC	Pts	Ref
1999	Morgan-Dollar Motorsports	46	Ford	TUS	LVS; 33	PHO	CAL	PPR; 32	MMR	IRW	EVG	POR	IRW	RMR	LVS	MMR	MOT	63rd	131	
