= 1998 NASCAR Craftsman Truck Series =

American motorsport season

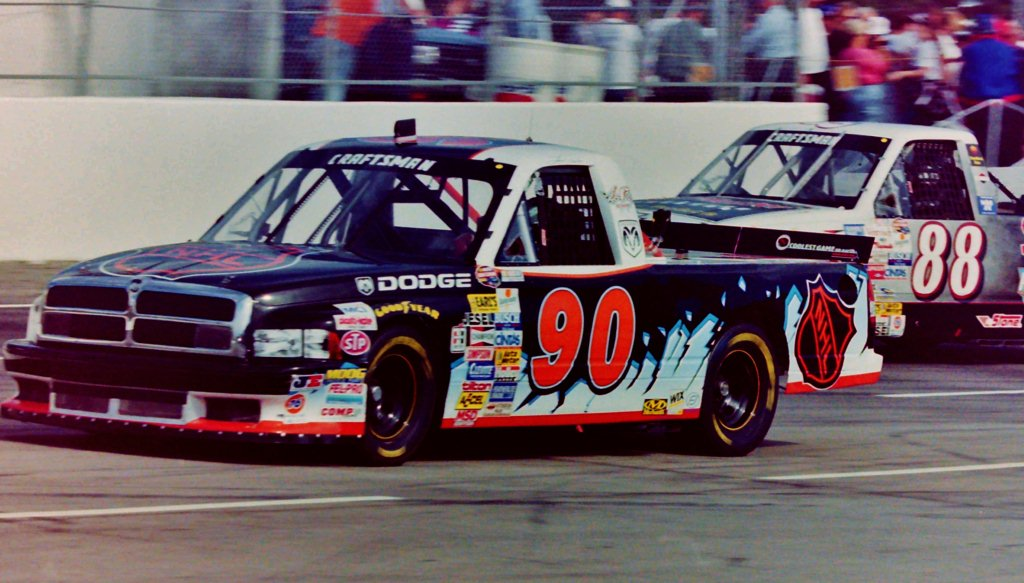
Lance Norick (No. 90) and Terry Cook (No. 88) - 1998 NASCAR Craftsman Truck Series

The 1998 NASCAR Craftsman Truck Series was the fourth season of the Craftsman Truck Series, the third highest stock car racing series sanctioned by NASCAR in the United States. Ron Hornaday Jr. of Dale Earnhardt, Inc. won the championship.

== Teams & Drivers ==
List of full-time teams at the start of 1998.

Team	Truck(s)	No.	Driver(s)	Listed owner(s)	Crew chief
Addington Racing	Chevrolet C/K	60	Andy Houston (R)	Mike Addington	Rick Ren
Brevak Racing	Ford F-150	31	Tony Roper	Shelly Brevak	Joe Shear Jr.
Brewco Motorsports	Chevrolet C/K	37	Scot Walters (R)	Clarence Brewer	Terry Shirley
Charles Hardy Motorsports	Chevrolet C/K	35	Ron Barfield Jr.	Charles Hardy	Cal Dooley
Chesrown Racing	Chevrolet C/K	6	Rick Carelli	Marshall Chesrown	George Church
Circle Bar Racing	Ford F-150	14	Rick Crawford	Tom Mitchell	Roland Wlodyka
CSG Motorsports	Ford F-150	57	Chuck Bown	Kerry Scherer	Tony Gibson
Dale Earnhardt, Inc.	Chevrolet C/K	16	Ron Hornaday Jr.	Dale Earnhardt	Fred Graves
Gloy/Rahal Racing	Ford F-150	55	Dave Rezendes	Tom Gloy	Kevin Caldwell
Hendrick Motorsports	Chevrolet C/K	24	Jack Sprague	Rick Hendrick	Dennis Connor
Impact Motorsports	Ford F-150	86	Stacy Compton	David Hodson	Kevin Cram
Irvan-Simo Racing	Ford F-150	44	Boris Said	Mark Simo	Jay Smith
K Automotive Racing	Dodge Ram	29	Bob Keselowski	Kay Keselowski	Ron Keselowski
Ken Schrader Racing	Chevrolet C/K	52	Mike Wallace	Ken Schrader	Tim Kohuth
L&R Racing	Dodge Ram	18	Butch Miller	Ron Norick	Doug Strother
L&R Racing	Dodge Ram	90	Lance Norick	Ron Norick	Mike Cheek
Liberty Racing	Ford F-150	84	Wayne Anderson (R)	Jim Herrick	Troy Selberg
Lucore Motorsports	Ford F-150	82	Randy Nelson (R)	Steve Lucore	Dave Nelson
MB Motorsports	Ford F-150	26	Doug George	Mike Mittler	Mike Mittler
McCray Racing	Chevrolet C/K	42	Rick McCray	Sandy McCray	Rickey McCray
PacWest S/T Motorsports	Dodge Ram	78	Dominic Dobson (R)	Dominic Dobson	Walter Giles
Phelon Motorsports	Ford F-150	66	Bryan Reffner	Dale Phelon	Les Back
Richard Childress Racing	Chevrolet C/K	3	Jay Sauter	Richard Childress	Todd Berrier
Petty Enterprises	Dodge Ram	43	Jimmy Hensley	Richard Petty	Freddy Fryar
Roehrig Motorsports	Ford F-150	19	Tony Raines	Carmela Roehrig	Scott Treichler
Roush Racing	Ford F-150	50	Greg Biffle (R)	Jack Roush	Randy Goss
Roush Racing	Ford F-150	99	Joe Ruttman	Jack Roush	Matt Chambers
SealMaster Racing	Chevrolet C/K	88	Terry Cook	Duke Thorson	Tim Murphy
Spears Motorsports	Chevrolet C/K	75	Kevin Harvick	Wayne Spears	John McQueen
Ultra Motorsports	Ford F-150	2	Mike Bliss	Marlene Smith	Barry Dodson
Wharton Racing	Chevrolet C/K	10	Lonnie Rush Jr.	Jerry Wharton	Jim Daly
Xpress Motorsports	Chevrolet C/K	61	Randy Tolsma	Steve Coulter	Dave Fuge

== Schedule ==
No.	Race title	Track	Date
1	Chevy Trucks Challenge	Walt Disney World Speedway, Bay Lake	January 18
2	Florida Dodge Dealers 400	Homestead-Miami Speedway, Homestead	April 4
3	Chevy Trucks 150	Phoenix International Raceway, Phoenix	April 19
4	Craftsman 200 by NAPA	Portland Speedway, Portland	April 25
5	NAPACARD 200	Evergreen Speedway, Monroe	May 9
6	Yellow Freight 200	I-70 Speedway, Odessa	May 23
7	Parts America 150	Watkins Glen International, Watkins Glen	May 30
8	Pronto Auto Parts 400K	Texas Motor Speedway, Fort Worth	June 5
9	Loadhandler 200	Bristol Motor Speedway, Bristol	June 20
10	DieHard 200	The Milwaukee Mile, West Allis	July 4
11	NAPA Autocare 200	Nazareth Speedway, Nazareth	July 11
12	The No Fear Challenge	California Speedway, Fontana	July 18
13	Tempus Resorts 300K	Pikes Peak International Raceway, Fountain	July 25
14	Cummins 200 by Dodge	Indianapolis Raceway Park, Brownsburg	July 30
15	Pennzoil/VIP Discount Tripleheader	New Hampshire International Speedway, Loudon	August 2
16	Stevens Beil/Genuine Car Parts 200	Flemington Speedway, Flemington	August 8
17	Federated Auto Parts 250	Nashville Speedway USA, Lebanon	August 15
18	Lund Look 275K	Heartland Park Topeka, Topeka	August 23
19	Kroger 225	Louisville Motor Speedway, Louisville	August 29
20	Virginia Is For Lovers 200	Richmond International Raceway, Richmond	September 10
21	Memphis 200	Memphis Motorsports Park, Millington	September 13
22	Ram Tough 200	Gateway International Raceway, Madison	September 19
23	NAPA 250	Martinsville Speedway, Ridgeway	September 26
24	Kragen/Exide 151	Sears Point Raceway, Sonoma	October 11
25	Dodge California Truck Stop 300	Mesa Marin Raceway, Bakersfield	October 19
26	GM Goodwrench Service/AC Delco 300	Phoenix International Raceway, Phoenix	October 24
27	Sam's Town 250	Las Vegas Motor Speedway, Las Vegas	November 8

== Races ==
No.	Race	Pole position	Most laps led	Winning driver	Manufacturer
1	Chevy Trucks Challenge	Chuck Bown	Chuck Bown	Ron Hornaday Jr.	Chevrolet
2	Florida Dodge Dealers 400	Jack Sprague	Jack Sprague	Rick Crawford	Ford
3	Chevy Trucks 150	Stacy Compton	Jack Sprague	Ron Hornaday Jr.	Chevrolet
4	Craftsman 200 by NAPA	Greg Biffle	Stacy Compton	Stacy Compton	Ford
5	NAPACARD 200	Joe Ruttman	Jack Sprague	Jack Sprague	Chevrolet
6	Yellow Freight 200	Tony Raines	Tony Raines	Tony Raines	Ford
7	Parts America 150	Ron Fellows	Ron Hornaday Jr.	Joe Ruttman	Ford
8	Pronto Auto Parts 400K	Jack Sprague	Jack Sprague	Tony Raines	Ford
9	Loadhandler 200	Ron Hornaday Jr.	Ron Hornaday Jr.	Ron Hornaday Jr.	Chevrolet
10	DieHard 200	Jack Sprague	Mike Bliss	Mike Bliss	Ford
11	NAPA Autocare 200	Mike Bliss	Ron Hornaday Jr.	Ron Hornaday Jr.	Chevrolet
12	The No Fear Challenge	Andy Houston	Ron Hornaday Jr.	Jack Sprague	Chevrolet
13	Tempus Resorts 300K	Mike Bliss	Ron Hornaday Jr.	Ron Hornaday Jr.	Chevrolet
14	Cummins 200 by Dodge	Randy Tolsma	Jack Sprague	Jack Sprague	Chevrolet
15	Pennzoil/VIP Discount Tripleheader	Mike Wallace	Andy Houston	Andy Houston	Chevrolet
16	Stevens Beil/Genuine Car Parts 200	Stacy Compton	Stacy Compton	Terry Cook	Chevrolet
17	Federated Auto Parts 250	Mike Bliss	Mike Bliss	Jimmy Hensley	Dodge
18	Lund Look 275K	Boris Said	Tom Hubert	Stacy Compton	Ford
19	Kroger 225	Terry Cook	Mike Bliss	Tony Raines	Ford
20	Virginia Is For Lovers 200	Joe Ruttman	Jack Sprague	Jack Sprague	Chevrolet
21	Memphis 200	Greg Biffle	Greg Biffle	Ron Hornaday Jr.	Chevrolet
22	Ram Tough 200	Greg Biffle	Rick Carelli	Rick Carelli	Chevrolet
23	NAPA 250	Greg Biffle	Greg Biffle	Jay Sauter	Chevrolet
24	Kragen/Exide 151	Tom Hubert	Boris Said	Boris Said	Ford
25	Dodge California Truck Stop 300	Ron Hornaday Jr.	Mike Bliss	Dennis Setzer	Dodge
26	GM Goodwrench Service/AC Delco 300	Mike Bliss	Mike Bliss	Mike Bliss	Ford
27	Sam's Town 250	Jack Sprague	Mike Bliss	Jack Sprague	Chevrolet

=== Chevy Trucks Challenge ===
The Chevy Trucks Challenge was held January 18 at Walt Disney World Speedway. Chuck Bown won the pole.

Top ten results

1. #16 - Ron Hornaday Jr.
2. #50 - Joe Ruttman
3. #6 - Rick Carelli
4. #24 - Jack Sprague
5. #80 - Greg Biffle
6. #87 - Joe Nemechek
7. #3 - Jay Sauter
8. #29 - Bob Keselowski
9. #18 - Butch Miller
10. #78 - Rich Bickle

Failed to qualify: Lance Norick (#90), Curtis Markham (#32), David Starr (#9), Dennis Setzer (#04), Freddie Query (#20), Ken Bouchard (#77), Andy Michner (#46), Rick McCray (#42), Billy Bigley (#26), Kirk Shelmerdine (#03), Joe Bush (#67), Dave Goulet (#70), Dave Stacy (#12), Jimmy Davis (#13), Ricky Johnson (#63), Randy Nelson (#82), Kelly Denton (#30), Monty Klein (#47), Rob Morgan (#46), Billy Pauch (#06), Michael Dokken (#64), Jay Stewart (#33), Danny Bagwell (#28)

=== Florida Dodge Dealers 400 ===
The Florida Dodge Dealers 400 was held April 4 at Homestead-Miami Speedway. Jack Sprague won the pole.

Top ten results

1. #14 - Rick Crawford*
2. #24 - Jack Sprague
3. #3 - Jay Sauter
4. #50 - Greg Biffle
5. #35 - Ron Barfield Jr.
6. #86 - Stacy Compton
7. #29 - Bob Keselowski
8. #16 - Ron Hornaday Jr.
9. #55 - Dave Rezendes
10. #37 - Scot Walters

Failed to qualify: Carl Long (#91), Dennis Setzer (#04), Michael Dokken (#64), Mike Garvey (#68), Jamie Skinner (#5), Ken Bouchard (#77), B. A. Wilson (#85), Rick McCray (#42), Tommy Archer (#4), Scott Lagasse (#81), Dominic Dobson (#78), Tim Bolton (#97), Joe Madore (#93), Rob Morgan (#46), Jason Roche (#21), Bobby Myers (#63)

- This was Crawford's first career Truck Series victory.

=== Chevy Trucks 150 ===
The Chevy Trucks 150 was held April 19 at Phoenix International Raceway. Stacy Compton won the pole.

Top ten results

1. #16 - Ron Hornaday Jr.
2. #24 - Jack Sprague
3. #86 - Stacy Compton
4. #60 - Andy Houston
5. #14 - Rick Crawford
6. #3 - Jay Sauter
7. #99 - Joe Ruttman
8. #66 - Bryan Reffner
9. #19 - Tony Raines
10. #61 - Randy Tolsma

Failed to qualify: Milan Garrett (#85) and Randy Nelson (#82)

=== Craftsman 200 by NAPA ===
The Craftsman 200 by NAPA was held April 25 at Portland Speedway. Greg Biffle won the pole.

Top ten results

1. #86 - Stacy Compton*
2. #61 - Randy Tolsma
3. #6 - Rick Carelli
4. #24 - Jack Sprague
5. #19 - Tony Raines
6. #16 - Ron Hornaday Jr.
7. #66 - Bryan Reffner
8. #3 - Jay Sauter
9. #99 - Joe Ruttman
10. #31 - Tony Roper

Failed to qualify: Jason Roche (#21)

- This was Compton's first career Truck Series victory.

=== NAPACARD 200 ===
The NAPACARD 200 was held May 9 at Evergreen Speedway. Joe Ruttman won the pole.

Top ten results

1. #24 - Jack Sprague
2. #16 - Ron Hornaday Jr.
3. #61 - Randy Tolsma
4. #86 - Stacy Compton
5. #52 - Mike Wallace
6. #31 - Tony Roper
7. #6 - Rick Carelli
8. #66 - Bryan Reffner
9. #35 - Ron Barfield Jr.
10. #18 - Butch Miller

Failed to qualify: none

=== Yellow Freight 200 ===
The Yellow Freight 200 was held May 23 at I-70 Speedway. Tony Raines won the pole.

Top ten results

1. #19 - Tony Raines
2. #99 - Joe Ruttman
3. #2 - Mike Bliss
4. #66 - Bryan Reffner
5. #24 - Jack Sprague
6. #16 - Ron Hornaday Jr.
7. #52 - Mike Wallace
8. #31 - Tony Roper
9. #84 - Wayne Anderson
10. #60 - Andy Houston

Failed to qualify: Richard Hinds (#81), Rick McCray (#42), Joe Bush (#67), Joe Madore (#93), Randy Nelson (#82), Doug George (#26), Ryan McGlynn (#00)

=== Parts America 150 ===
The Parts America 150 was held May 30 at Watkins Glen International. Ron Fellows won the pole. Race leader Ron Hornaday Jr. was penalized in the closing laps for jumping a restart and pulled into victory lane regardless to protest NASCAR's call.

Top ten results

1. #99 - Joe Ruttman
2. #3 - Jay Sauter
3. #44 - Boris Said
4. #16 - Ron Hornaday Jr.
5. #24 - Jack Sprague
6. #28 - Mark Simo
7. #2 - Mike Bliss
8. #98 - Rob Rizzo
9. #61 - Randy Tolsma
10. #52 - Mike Wallace

Failed to qualify: Randy Nelson (#82), Doug George (#26), Mike Ewanitsko (#40), Lonnie Rush Jr. (#10), Mike Hope (#13), Ryan McGlynn (#00)

=== Pronto Auto Parts 400 ===
The Pronto Auto Parts 400K was held June 5 at Texas Motor Speedway. Jack Sprague won the pole. Mike Bliss suffered a broken scapula in a multi-car crash on the third lap.

Top ten results

1. #19 - Tony Raines
2. #60 - Andy Houston
3. #99 - Joe Ruttman
4. #75 - Kevin Harvick
5. #86 - Stacy Compton
6. #24 - Jack Sprague
7. #48 - Ron Fellows
8. #5 - Dave Rezendes
9. #6 - Rick Carelli
10. #88 - Terry Cook

Failed to qualify: Rob Rizzo (#98), Doug George (#93), Joe Gaita (#83), Chris Horn (#58), Jay Stewart (#33)

- Kenny Allen replaced Randy Nelson in the #82 for the race after Nelson fell ill following qualifying.

=== Loadhandler 200 ===
The Loadhandler 200 was held June 20 at Bristol Motor Speedway. Ron Hornaday Jr. won the pole.

Top ten results

1. #16 - Ron Hornaday Jr.
2. #24 - Jack Sprague
3. #99 - Joe Ruttman
4. #52 - Mike Wallace
5. #61 - Randy Tolsma
6. #19 - Tony Raines
7. #35 - Ron Barfield Jr.
8. #31 - Kevin Cywinski
9. #43 - Jimmy Hensley
10. #66 - Bryan Reffner

Failed to qualify: Danny Bagwell (#28), Tim Bolton (#97), Ed Berrier (#92), Ryan McGlynn (#00), Joe Gaita (#83), Rob Morgan (#57)

=== DieHard 200 ===
The DieHard 200 was held July 4 at The Milwaukee Mile. Jack Sprague won the pole.

Top ten results

1. #2 - Mike Bliss
2. #43 - Jimmy Hensley
3. #24 - Jack Sprague
4. #16 - Ron Hornaday Jr.
5. #50 - Greg Biffle
6. #6 - Rick Carelli
7. #99 - Joe Ruttman
8. #52 - Mike Wallace
9. #35 - Ron Barfield Jr.
10. #18 - Butch Miller

Failed to qualify: Tammy Jo Kirk (#51), Ken Bouchard (#11), B. A. Wilson (#85), Rob Rizzo (#98), Terry Fisher (#41), Barry Bodine (#7), Joe Bush (#67), Jerry Glanville (#81), Danny Bagwell (#28), Chris Horn (#58), Tim Bolton (#97), Randy Nelson (#82)

=== NAPA Autocare 200 ===
The NAPA Autocare 200 was held July 11 at Nazareth Speedway. Mike Bliss won the pole.

Top ten results

1. #16 - Ron Hornaday Jr.
2. #86 - Stacy Compton
3. #3 - Jay Sauter
4. #18 - Butch Miller
5. #99 - Joe Ruttman
6. #43 - Jimmy Hensley
7. #19 - Tony Raines
8. #66 - Bryan Reffner
9. #6 - Rick Carelli
10. #24 - Jack Sprague

Failed to qualify: none

=== The No Fear Challenge ===
The No Fear Challenge was held July 18 at California Speedway. Andy Houston won the pole.

Top ten results

1. #24 - Jack Sprague
2. #28 - Ernie Irvan
3. #16 - Ron Hornaday Jr.
4. #60 - Andy Houston
5. #5 - Mike Skinner
6. #61 - Randy Tolsma
7. #50 - Greg Biffle
8. #44 - Boris Said
9. #2 - Mike Bliss
10. #18 - Butch Miller

Failed to qualify: Rick McCray (#42), Randy Nelson (#82), Milan Garrett (#85)

=== Tempus Resorts 300K ===
The inaugural Tempus Resorts 300K was held July 25 at Pikes Peak International Raceway. Mike Bliss won the pole.

Top ten results

1. #16 - Ron Hornaday Jr.
2. #19 - Tony Raines
3. #99 - Joe Ruttman
4. #6 - Rick Carelli
5. #43 - Jimmy Hensley
6. #2 - Mike Bliss
7. #86 - Stacy Compton
8. #29 - Dennis Setzer
9. #61 - Randy Tolsma
10. #55 - Tony Roper

Failed to qualify: none

=== Cummins 200 by Dodge ===
The Cummins 200 by Dodge was held July 30 at Indianapolis Raceway Park. Randy Tolsma won the pole.

Top ten results

1. #24 - Jack Sprague
2. #55 - Tony Roper
3. #99 - Joe Ruttman
4. #19 - Tony Raines
5. #10 - Lonnie Rush Jr.
6. #61 - Randy Tolsma
7. #50 - Greg Biffle
8. #29 - Dennis Setzer
9. #35 - Ron Barfield Jr.
10. #3 - Jay Sauter

Failed to qualify: Shayne Lockhart (#33), David Starr (#49), Robbie Pyle (#56)

- This race is mostly known for the infamous white glove incident that involved race winner Sprague and Ron Hornaday Jr. as they head into turn 1 and Hornaday was shoved into the wall.

=== Pennzoil/VIP Discount Tripleheader ===
The Pennzoil/VIP Discount Tripleheader was held August 2 at New Hampshire International Speedway. Mike Wallace won the pole.

Top ten results

1. #60 - Andy Houston*
2. #50 - Greg Biffle
3. #99 - Joe Ruttman
4. #35 - Ron Barfield Jr.
5. #19 - Tony Raines
6. #43 - Jimmy Hensley
7. #75 - Kevin Harvick
8. #24 - Jack Sprague
9. #86 - Stacy Compton
10. #16 - Ron Hornaday Jr.

Failed to qualify: none

- This was Houston's first career Truck Series victory.

=== Stevens Beil/Genuine Car Parts 200 ===
The Stevens Beil/Genuine Car Parts 200 was held August 8 at Flemington Speedway. Stacy Compton won the pole.

Top ten results

1. #88 - Terry Cook*
2. #16 - Ron Hornaday Jr.
3. #66 - Bryan Reffner
4. #99 - Joe Ruttman
5. #43 - Jimmy Hensley
6. #06 - Billy Pauch*
7. #35 - Ron Barfield Jr.
8. #09 - Randy MacDonald
9. #75 - Kevin Harvick
10. #52 - Mike Wallace

Failed to qualify: John Blewett III (#05), George Brunnhoelzl (#40), Lance Norick (#90), Randy Renfrow (#78), Ryan McGlynn (#00)

- This was Cook's first career Truck Series victory, and the first victory for ThorSport Racing.
- Partway through the race, Pauch began suffering from heat exhaustion and had to step out of the truck. John Blewett III drove Pauch's truck for the remainder of the event.

=== Federated Auto Parts 250 ===
The Federated Auto Parts 250 was held August 15 at Nashville Speedway USA. Mike Bliss won the pole.

Top ten results

1. #43 - Jimmy Hensley*
2. #19 - Tony Raines
3. #14 - Rick Crawford
4. #50 - Greg Biffle
5. #52 - Mike Wallace
6. #61 - Randy Tolsma
7. #16 - Ron Hornaday Jr.
8. #37 - Scot Walters
9. #86 - Stacy Compton
10. #35 - Ron Barfield Jr.

Failed to qualify: Brandon Butler (#22), Tom Hubert (#77), Cindy Peterson (#36), Ryan McGlynn (#00), Jerry Glanville (#81)

- This was Hensley's first career Truck Series victory.

=== Lund Look 275K ===
The Lund Look 275K was held August 23 at Heartland Park Topeka. Boris Said won the pole.

Top ten results

1. #86 - Stacy Compton
2. #88 - Terry Cook
3. #43 - Jimmy Hensley
4. #24 - Jack Sprague
5. #75 - Kevin Harvick
6. #18 - Butch Miller
7. #3 - Jay Sauter
8. #16 - Ron Hornaday Jr.
9. #99 - Joe Ruttman
10. #29 - Bob Keselowski

Failed to qualify: none

=== Kroger 225 ===
The Kroger 225 was held August 29 at Louisville Motor Speedway. Terry Cook won the pole.

Top ten results

1. #19 - Tony Raines
2. #2 - Mike Bliss
3. #60 - Andy Houston
4. #86 - Stacy Compton
5. #88 - Terry Cook
6. #55 - Tony Roper
7. #43 - Jimmy Hensley
8. #50 - Greg Biffle
9. #24 - Jack Sprague
10. #52 - Mike Wallace

Failed to qualify: none

=== Virginia Is For Lovers 200 ===
The Virginia Is For Lovers 200 was held September 10 at Richmond International Raceway. Joe Ruttman won the pole.

Top ten results

1. #24 - Jack Sprague
2. #28 - Ernie Irvan
3. #50 - Greg Biffle
4. #99 - Joe Ruttman
5. #18 - Butch Miller
6. #15 - Rich Bickle
7. #61 - Randy Tolsma
8. #6 - Rick Carelli
9. #88 - Terry Cook
10. #52 - Mike Wallace

Failed to qualify: Carl Long (#91), Joe Gaita (#83), Tammy Jo Kirk (#51), Shayne Lockhart (#33), Blake Bainbridge (#9), Billy Pauch (#06), Rick Wilson (#04), Terry Fisher (#41), Mike Ewanitsko (#42), Brian Sockwell (#30), Tom Baldwin (#48)

=== Memphis 200 ===
The Memphis 200 was held September 13 at Memphis Motorsports Park. Greg Biffle won the pole.

Top ten results

1. #16 - Ron Hornaday Jr.
2. #3 - Jay Sauter
3. #43 - Jimmy Hensley
4. #99 - Joe Ruttman
5. #14 - Rick Crawford
6. #35 - Ron Barfield Jr.
7. #52 - Mike Wallace
8. #88 - Terry Cook
9. #24 - Jack Sprague
10. #84 - Wayne Anderson

Failed to qualify: Ryan McGlynn (#00)

=== Ram Tough 200 ===
The Ram Tough 200 was held September 19 at Gateway International Raceway. Greg Biffle won the pole.

Top ten results

1. #6 - Rick Carelli
2. #14 - Ron Hornaday Jr.
3. #3 - Jay Sauter
4. #24 - Jack Sprague
5. #66 - Tom Hubert
6. #43 - Jimmy Hensley
7. #14 - Rick Crawford
8. #52 - Mike Wallace
9. #37 - Scot Walters
10. #84 - Bryan Reffner

Failed to qualify: none

=== NAPA 250 ===
The NAPA 250 was held September 26 at Martinsville Speedway. Greg Biffle won the pole.

Top ten results

1. #3 - Jay Sauter
2. #43 - Jimmy Hensley
3. #16 - Ron Hornaday Jr.
4. #86 - Stacy Compton
5. #15 - Rich Bickle
6. #29 - Dennis Setzer
7. #19 - Tony Raines
8. #50 - Greg Biffle
9. #61 - Randy Renfrow
10. #24 - Jack Sprague

Failed to qualify: Greg Marlowe (#30), Carl Long (#91), Nipper Alsup (#92), Mike Olsen (#62), Donny Ling Jr. (#68), Ronnie Newman (#11), Jeff Spraker (#69), Ryan McGlynn (#00)

=== Kragen/Exide 151 ===
The Kragen/Exide 151 was held October 11 at Sears Point Raceway. Tom Hubert won the pole.

Top ten results

1. #44 - Boris Said*
2. #2 - Mike Bliss
3. #19 - Tony Raines
4. #99 - Joe Ruttman
5. #43 - Jimmy Hensley
6. #60 - Andy Houston
7. #90 - Lance Norick
8. #3 - Jay Sauter
9. #24 - Jack Sprague
10. #84 - Doug George

Failed to qualify: none

- This was Said's first and only career Truck Series victory.

=== Dodge California Truck Stop 300 ===
The Dodge California Truck Stop 300 was held October 18 at Mesa Marin Raceway. Ron Hornaday Jr. won the pole.

Top ten results

1. #29 - Dennis Setzer*
2. #24 - Jack Sprague*
3. #86 - Stacy Compton
4. #16 - Ron Hornaday Jr.
5. #75 - Kevin Harvick
6. #6 - Rick Carelli
7. #18 - Butch Miller
8. #3 - Jay Sauter
9. #60 - Andy Houston
10. #19 - Tony Raines

Failed to qualify: none

- This was Setzer's first career Truck Series victory.
- After this race, Sprague held a 28-point lead over Hornaday Jr. with two races left.

=== GM Goodwrench Service/AC Delco 300 ===
The GM Goodwrench Service/AC Delco 300 was held October 24 at Phoenix International Raceway. Mike Bliss won the pole.

Top ten results

1. #2 - Mike Bliss
2. #50 - Greg Biffle
3. #16 - Ron Hornaday Jr.*
4. #99 - Joe Ruttman
5. #60 - Andy Houston
6. #29 - Dennis Setzer
7. #44 - Boris Said
8. #86 - Stacy Compton
9. #43 - Jimmy Hensley
10. #19 - Tony Raines

Failed to qualify: Bill Sedgwick (#4), Brandon Sperling (#42), Mike Clark (#38)

- With his third-place finish and Sprague finishing 13th, Hornaday Jr. took a 13-point lead over Sprague with one race left in the season.

=== Sam's Town 250 ===
The Sam's Town 250 was held November 8 at Las Vegas Motor Speedway. Jack Sprague won the pole. Sprague would win the race, but Hornaday Jr. finished second, securing his second Truck Series championship by only 3 points.

Top ten results

1. #24 - Jack Sprague
2. #16 - Ron Hornaday Jr.
3. #43 - Jimmy Hensley
4. #3 - Jay Sauter
5. #50 - Greg Biffle
6. #2 - Mike Bliss
7. #99 - Joe Ruttman
8. #66 - Mike Stefanik
9. #35 - Ron Barfield Jr.
10. #18 - Butch Miller

Failed to qualify: Rob Morgan (#46), Danny Bagwell (#28), Chris Horn (#58), Austin Cameron (#4), David Starr (#9), Jerry Robertson (#12), Ricky Logan (#36), Mike Clark (#38), Richard Hinds (#81), Milan Garrett (#85)

== Final points standings ==
(key) Bold – Pole position awarded by time. Italics – Pole position earned by points standings. * – Most laps led.

Pos.	Driver	Races																											Points
Pos.	Driver	WDW	HOM	PHO	POR	EVG	I70	WGL	TEX	BRI	MLW	NAZ	CAL	PPR	IRP	NHA	FLM	NSV	HPT	LVL	RCH	MEM	GTY	MAR	SON	MMR	PHO	LVS	Points
1	Ron Hornaday Jr.	1	8	1	6	2	6	4*	24	**1***	4	1*	3*	1*	28	10	2	7	8	17	22	1	2	3	23	**4**	3	2	4072
2	Jack Sprague	4	**2***	2*	4	1*	5	5	6	2	**3**	10	1	31	1*	8	29	11	4	9	1*	9	4	10	9	2	13	**1**	4069
3	Joe Ruttman	2	22	7	9	**12**	2	1	3	3	7	5	11	3	3	3	4	24	9	27	**4**	4	18	21	4	13	4	7	3874
4	Jay Sauter	7	3	6	8	16	16	2	16	12	14	3	24	22	10	11	13	15	7	20	17	2	3	1	8	8	12	4	3672
5	Tony Raines	16	25	9	5	18	**1***	12	1	6	15	7	17	2	4	5	17	2	14	1	28	25	32	7	3	10	10	22	3596
6	Jimmy Hensley	14	28	14	12	19	24	31	33	9	2	6	20	5	14	6	5	1	3	7	16	3	6	2	5	21	9	3	3570
7	Stacy Compton	30	6	**3**	1*	4	11	19	5	37	13	2	14	7	13	9	**28***	9	1	4	23	16	26	4	15	3	8	17	3542
8	Greg Biffle **(R)**	5	4	36	**26**	17	21	27	22	29	5	30	7	17	7	2	24	4	21	8	3	**22***	**19**	**8**	20	14	2	5	3276
9	Ron Barfield Jr.	22	5	21	18	9	12	23	30	7	9	20	28	13	9	4	7	10	16	11	30	6	14	20	13	23	15	9	3227
10	Mike Bliss	12	14	33	28	30	3	7	37	25	1*	**25**	9	**6**	27	15	12	**12***	20	2*	27	23	17	13	2	19*	**1***	6*	3216
11	Rick Carelli	3	18	17	3	7	32	28	9	30	6	9	16	4	17	20	16	17	30	31	8	30	1*	11	11	6	11	35	3195
12	Andy Houston **(R)**	27	20	4	16	28	10	15	2	28	29	15	**4**	18	26	1*	20	13	32	3	12	34	30	12	6	9	5	11	3188
13	Mike Wallace	24	34	11	19	5	7	10	12	4	8	22	12	30	33	**14**	10	5	27	10	10	7	8	24	22	20	30	12	3152
14	Randy Tolsma	20	37	10	2	3	17	9	25	5	12	18	6	9	**6**	25	26	6	25	22	7	13	16	14	19	34	34	25	3121
15	Butch Miller	9	21	31	11	10	13	20	13	33	10	4	10	16	15	30	21	28	6	14	5	12	28	28	28	7	33	10	3034
16	Tony Roper	28	36	12	10	6	8	30	11	15	18	12	18	10	2	36	14	21	24	6	13	17	15	18	12	16	25	38	3016
17	Kevin Harvick	18	13	13	14	31	26	29	4	22	11	14	30	15	11	7	9		5	13	25	15	11	25	17	5	18	20	3004
18	Rick Crawford	29	1	5	27	21	18	14	26	38	26	29	15	11	34	22	15	3	15	25	11	5	7	15	29	27	16	14	2956
19	Scot Walters **(R)**	26	10	22	22	25	15	22	36	21	20	13	21	12	21	19	22	8	13	12	20	36	9	16	16	15	21	23	2859
20	Terry Cook	21	38	16	31	29	20	24	10	14	32	34	19	23	20	12	1	25	2	**5**	9	8	22	22	30	11	22	34	2845
21	Boris Said	11	24	15	23	26	29	3	38	20	17	27	8	24	29	18	19	23	**22**	23	19	14	21	29	1*	24	7	28	2813
22	Bryan Reffner	13	31	8	7	8	4	18	35	10	19	8	13	29	12	31	3	14	34	15	35	28	10	23	32		24	37	2770
23	Lance Norick	DNQ	27	35	21	14	30	25	19	32	22	21	17	21	32	28	DNQ	22	19	19	24	20	12	19	7	17	23	16	2539
24	Lonnie Rush Jr.	33	32	26	20	11	27	DNQ	31	11	27	23	29	20	5	13	27	27	33	16	18	11	24	27			36	18	2333
25	Wayne Anderson **(R)**	15	19	20	25	15	9	26	21	34	25	26	34	25	18	23	30	18	12	26	21	10							2070
26	Bob Keselowski	8	7	32	13	13	28	21	29	18	34					16	11	16	10	24	15								1731
27	Dennis Setzer	DNQ	DNQ				31		14		21	11	25	8	8								13	6	14	1	6	13	1728
28	Kevin Cywinski **(R)**									8	33	32	23	19	22	24	18	20	11	28	29	32	29	30	25	22	32	21	1726
29	Tammy Jo Kirk	17	15				19		15	13	DNQ	16	32	34	31	34		26			DNQ	21						36	1296
30	Randy Renfrow												33	27	16	32	DNQ	29		18	31		25	9		29	26	40	1074
31	Barry Bodine	35	11					17	27		DNQ	24	35	14		21	23	33			33								1017
32	Randy MacDonald		29					11	32		28	19			23		8		26			27	20						964
33	Chuck Bown	**25***	12	23	15	20	22	16																			17	30	927
34	Doug George		33	30	30	32	DNQ	DNQ	DNQ																10	12	14	15	924
35	Dominic Dobson **(R)**		DNQ	19	29	22	25	34	17	35	31	33							23										842
36	B. A. Wilson		DNQ						34		DNQ				19			30			14	18		26		28		19	820
37	Rob Morgan **(R)**	DNQ	DNQ	27				32	20	DNQ	30	35		26					28						26			DNQ	711
38	Rick McCray **(R)**	DNQ	DNQ	28	32	27	DNQ						DNQ			27			29								28	29	710
39	Dave Rezendes	31	9	18	17				8	24																			662
40	Tom Hubert																	DNQ	18*	21			5	34	**27**			24	653
41	Randy Nelson	DNQ	26	24	24	23	DNQ	DNQ	Rpl	27	DNQ		DNQ																634
42	David Starr	DNQ		25			23		18				36		DNQ							24						DNQ	566
43	Rich Bickle	10	17																		6			5					551
44	Ryan McGlynn						DNQ	DNQ		DNQ		28				29	DNQ	DNQ				DNQ		DNQ					471
45	Ron Fellows							**33**	7			31		35					35										408
46	Curtis Markham	DNQ	23	34						17							25												404
47	Chris Horn								DNQ		DNQ			28					17				27					DNQ	375
48	Ken Bouchard	DNQ	DNQ							16	DNQ	17																	350
49	Milan Garrett			DNQ									DNQ												18	31	35	DNQ	348
50	Ernie Irvan												2								2								340
51	Joe Gaita	23	35						DNQ	DNQ											DNQ			35					330
52	Rob Rizzo		30					8	DNQ		DNQ																		310
53	Scott Hansen										24				24												31	39	298
54	Shayne Lockhart														DNQ			19			DNQ			32					274
55	Mike Skinner	19											5																261
56	Danny Bagwell	DNQ								DNQ	DNQ											31	31					DNQ	258
57	Mike Garvey		DNQ				14				23																		252
58	Blake Bainbridge														30			34			DNQ							33	238
59	Terry Fisher										DNQ			32							DNQ				24				235
60	Brandon Sperling																			30						18	DNQ		231
61	Jerry Glanville										DNQ		26	36				DNQ											223
62	Brad Teague									19														17					218
63	Carl Long		DNQ							31											DNQ			DNQ					217
64	Toby Porter								23		16																		209
65	Nipper Alsup																							DNQ			29	27	204
66	Brett Bodine	32																			32			35					192
67	Matt Hutter												22										22						191
68	Billy Pauch	DNQ															6				DNQ								188
69	Bobby Hamilton	34																			34			33					186
70	Joe Bush	DNQ					DNQ			36	DNQ																		175
71	Mike Clark																								21		DNQ	DNQ	165
72	Johnny Chapman																				36	19							161
73	Joe Buford									23								32											161
74	John Blewett III																DNQ				26								155
75	Sammy Potashnick																					26						31	155
76	Joe Nemechek	6																											150
77	Mark Simo							7																					150
78	Tim Boulton		DNQ							DNQ	DNQ					33													148
79	Mike Stefanik																											8	142
80	Stan Boyd																					29				33			140
81	Mike Ewanitsko							DNQ								35					DNQ								138
82	Bill Sedgwick																									26	DNQ		137
83	Brendan Gaughan													33														32	131
84	Dave Mader III																	31				35							128
85	Dorsey Schroeder							13																					124
86	Jamie Skinner		DNQ							26																			119
87	Jeff Spraker															26								DNQ					119
88	Frank Kimmel		16																										115
89	Nathan Buttke															17													112
90	Jay Stewart	DNQ		29					DNQ																				111
91	Bobby Dotter																										19		106
92	Kenny Irwin Jr.																										20		103
93	Ernie Cope					24																							91
94	Gary St. Amant														25														88
95	Auggie Vidovich																									25			88
96	Rick Beebe																											26	85
97	Jerry Nadeau																										27		82
98	Richard Hinds						DNQ																					DNQ	80
99	Kenny Allen								28																				79
100	Tommy Archer	36	DNQ																										77
101	Bill Kimmel																			29									76
102	Wayne Jacks																									30			73
103	Michael Waltrip												31																70
104	Tom Carey Jr.																							31					70
105	Kenny Gross																								31				70
106	Jason Roche		Wth		DNQ																								68
107	Jerry Cook																									32			67
108	George Brunnhoelzl Jr.																DNQ												67
109	Joe Madore		DNQ				DNQ																						65
110	Tim Ice																					33							67
111	Brandon Butler																	DNQ											58
112	Robbie Pyle														DNQ														52
113	Cindy Peterson																	DNQ											52
114	Greg Marlowe																							DNQ					52
115	Mike Hope							DNQ																					46
116	Mike Olsen																							DNQ					43
117	Michael Dokken	DNQ	DNQ																										41
118	Ed Berrier									DNQ																			40
119	Freddie Query	DNQ																											40
120	Donny Ling Jr.																							DNQ					40
121	Ronnie Newman																							DNQ					37
122	Andy Michner	DNQ																											34
123	Rick Wilson																				DNQ								34
124	Austin Cameron																											DNQ	31
125	Billy Bigley	DNQ																											28
126	Kirk Shelmerdine	DNQ																											25
127	Brian Sockwell																				DNQ								25
128	Jerry Robertson																											DNQ	25
129	Tom Baldwin																				DNQ								22
130	Ricky Logan																											DNQ	22
131	Dave Goulet	DNQ																											19
132	Scott Lagasse		DNQ																										19
133	Dave Stacy	DNQ																											16
134	Jimmy Davis	DNQ																											13
135	Ricky Johnson	DNQ																											10
136	Kelly Denton	DNQ																											4
137	Bobby Myers		Wth																										1
138	Monty Klein	DNQ																											1
Pos.	Driver	Races																											Points
Pos.	Driver	WDW	HOM	PHO	POR	EVG	I70	WGL	TEX	BRI	MLW	NAZ	CAL	PPR	IRP	NHA	FLM	NSV	HPT	LVL	RCH	MEM	GTY	MAR	SON	MMR	PHO	LVS	Points

== Rookie of the Year ==
In his first year of NASCAR competition, Greg Biffle won four poles and had twelve top-tens, earning him Rookie of the Year honors over Andy Houston, who had one win and a twelfth-place points finish. Scot Walters, driving for Brewco Motorsports's truck team, was the last contender to run a full schedule, posting three top-tens. Wayne Anderson was released during the season from his ride Liberty Racing, while Kevin Cywinski and Dominic Dobson were late entrants. Billy Pauch, Mike Cope, Joe Bush and Tommy Archer did not run enough races to qualify for the honor.

== See also ==
- 1998 NASCAR Winston Cup Series
- 1998 NASCAR Busch Series
- 1998 NASCAR Winston West Series
- 1998 ARCA Bondo/Mar-Hyde Series
- 1998 NASCAR Goody's Dash Series
