= Randy Moss Motorsports =

American truck racing team

- Owner(s): Randy Moss; David Dollar; Rob Morgan
- Base: Mooresville, North Carolina
- Series: Camping World Truck Series
- Race drivers: Dennis Setzer; Mike Skinner; Travis Kvapil
- Opened: 1997
- Closed: 2012

Career
- Race victories: 16 (13 as Morgan-Dollar Motorsports, 3 as Randy Moss Motorsports)

Randy Moss Motorsports with HTM (formerly known as Morgan-Dollar Motorsports) was a NASCAR Camping World Truck Series team. It was owned by David Dollar and NFL Hall of Fame wide receiver Randy Moss. Former driver Rob Morgan co-owned the team until 2004.

The team was originally based in Hennessey, Oklahoma, where it competed in Pro-Stock, Modified, and Asphalt Late Model races until it moved to North Carolina in 2004.

== Truck No. 5 history ==
The No. 5 truck debuted in 1997 at Sears Point International Raceway. Joe Bean qualified the No. 46 Ford F-150 in 28th place, but finished in ninth. Morgan ran two races for the team in 1998 with Acxiom sponsorship at Heartland Park Topeka and Sears Point, finishing 28th, and 26th, respectively. Morgan returned to drive full-time in 1999, posting a fifth-place finish at Topeka and finishing 19th in points. In 2000, he finished eighth at Kentucky Speedway and moved up to eighteenth in points.

After that season, Morgan retired from driving but remained on board as a partner with the team. They also switched to Chevy and hired Dennis Setzer as driver. In his first year, Setzer won three poles as well as a race at Memphis Motorsports Park, earning him a seventh-place points finish. After dropping to ninth in points in 2002, Setzer picked up three wins and finished second in points in 2003. Setzer also received sponsorship from the Chevy Silverado brand, and won four races in 2005. The team finished second in points for three consecutive years between 2003–2005.

For 2006, Morgan-Dollar Motorsports became the flagship team for Chevrolet. Chevrolet changed the team's factory sponsorship from Silverado to FlexFuel E85 Ethanol. The change was to help initiate General Motors' new Live Green Go Yellow initiative to promote the use of E85 Ethanol and the variety of FlexFuel vehicles the company produces. The team switched truck numbers from No. 46 to No. 85 to coincide with the E85 sponsorship. Setzer failed to win a race for the first time since 1997, causing him to leave the team. Kinser and Jesus Hernandez were originally scheduled to share the No. 47 truck in 2007, but after the merger between their primary owner Ginn Racing and Dale Earnhardt, Inc., Regan Smith became the team's new primary driver for the rest of the year. Timothy Peters drove the No. 47 at Martinsville Speedway with Tahoe Smokeless sponsoring, finishing 19th.

For 2009, Randy Moss Motorsports with HTM reopened the No. 47 team, renumbered to 46, then to No. 5, and named Mike Skinner the driver. Skinner gave Randy Moss Motorsports with HTM its first ever victory on April 27, 2009, at Kansas Speedway, behind the wheel of the No. 5 Bad Boy Mowers Toyota Tundra. Skinner went on to take the checkered flag twice more in 2009, on his way to 3rd place in the final points standings. Crew chief Eric Phillips left for Kyle Busch Motorsports after 2009 and was replaced by Gene Nead. However, Skinner's performance would drop dramatically, even more so when Nead left the team and was replaced by engineer Stacy Johnson. Skinner garnered only two top 5s and 8th place in points. Skinner left RMM at season's end, Exide also left the team at the season's end, citing issues with chemistry after losing Phillips. He was replaced by Travis Kvapil and crew chief Ricky Viers, who formerly worked with Roush Fenway Racing for the 2011 season. After early season struggles, Kvapil was replaced. In July, Todd Bodine became the driver of the No. 5 truck after a merger with Germain Racing after sponsorship issues plagued both operations. Germain ran the No. 5 truck out of their shop using RMM's equipment. However, Bodine went winless and departed for Red Horse Racing at the end of 2011. In early 2012, Camping World Truck reporter Ray Dunlap tweeted about the No. 5: "equipment sold, building locked, team defunct!"

Former crew chief Richie Wauters bought the remnants of the team and the owner points in January 2012, and the team was reformed as Wauters Motorsports.

== Truck No. 25 history ==
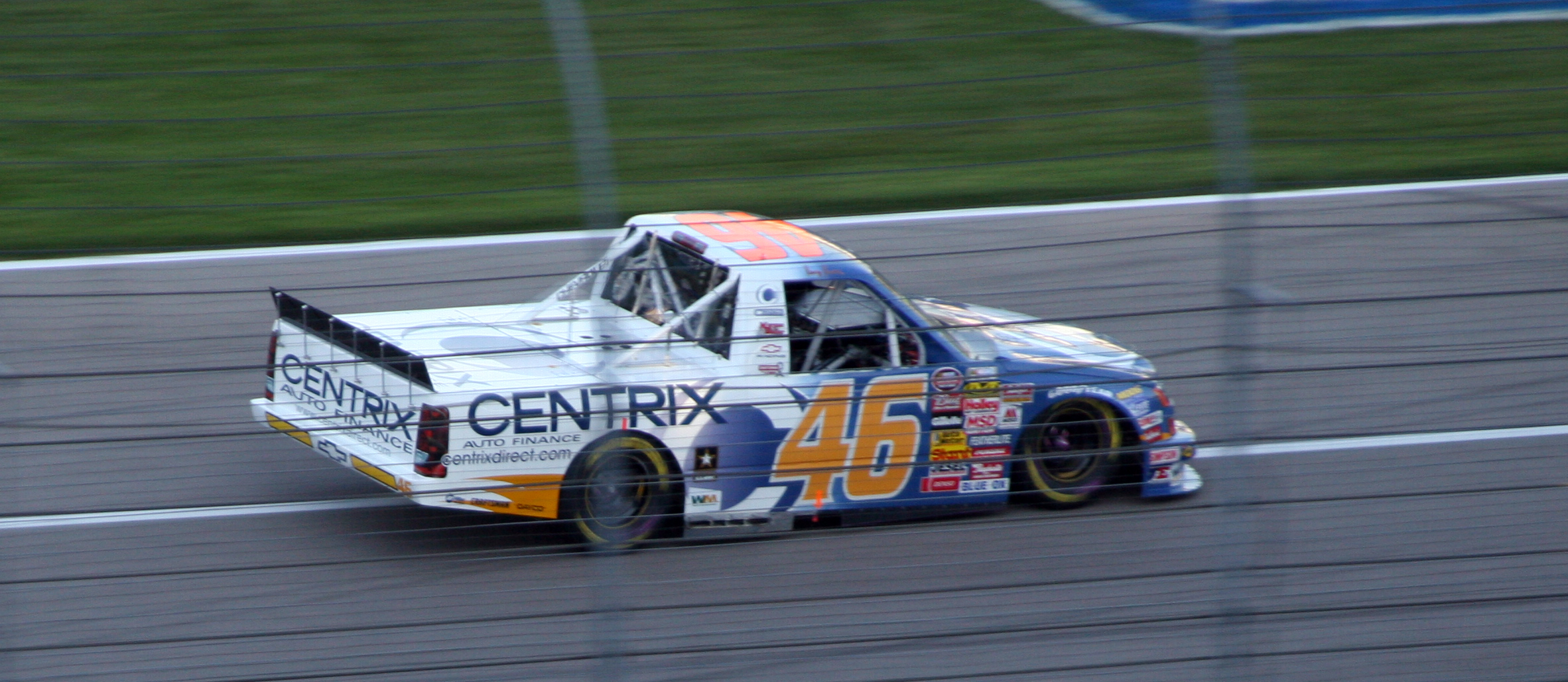
Kraig Kinser's No. 46 truck qualifying at Texas in 2006

The truck now numbered as No. 25 made its debut as the No. 47 in 2000 at the Bully Hill Vineyards 150. Morgan's father Charles drove the truck to an eighteenth-place finish.

The truck did not run again until 2004 when the Morgan-Dollar team debuted a special program called the Chevrolet Silverado All-Stars program, which was a unique program showcasing popular music stars and Chevrolet's Nextel Cup drivers. Michael Waltrip was the debut driver for this special program and drove the No. 47 truck to a fifth-place finish at the Infineon 200 at Lowe's Motor Speedway. Waltrip's truck carried a paint scheme featuring Sheryl Crow. For the remainder of the 2004 season, a series of rotating drivers raced the truck, with Tony Stewart, Robby Gordon and Bobby Labonte posting top-five finishes in the truck. The truck featured Sara Evans (Stewart), George Thorogood (Robby Gordon), Big and Rich (Ron Hornaday Jr.), Josh Turner (Labonte), Joe Nichols (Jason Leffler), Acxiom (Kyle Busch and J. J. Yeley), and Chevrolet Silverado (Labonte) as sponsors on the truck for the remainder of the season. Acxiom and Chevrolet Silverado split primary sponsorship on all of the trucks, except at Michigan International Speedway and Indianapolis Raceway Park (where Acxiom was on both the hood and quarter panels with drivers Yeley and Busch, respectively).

The Silverado All-Stars program returned in 2005, with Stewart, Labonte, Kevin Harvick, Aric Almirola, and Willie Allen all running. The truck featured sponsorship from Phil Vassar), Econo Lodge, Rodeway Inn, Trick Pony, Tork, Diamond Rio, Makita Tools, FedEx, Home Depot, City of Nashville, Julie Roberts, and Kiss. The truck came within .008 of a second from scoring its first victory with Labonte at the Atlanta Motor Speedway race in March 2005, then finally scored their first win with Labonte back at the wheel the next week at Martinsville Speedway.

In 2006, MB2 Motorsports development driver Kraig Kinser took over the truck, expanding Morgan-Dollar to two full-time truck teams. After DNQ-ing at California Speedway, the team switched to the No. 29 briefly to assume K Automotive Racing's owner's points, then switched to the No. 46. The truck alternated sponsors between Centrix Auto Finance and the U.S. Army, and also sported sponsorships from Ginn Clubs and Resorts and the Veterans of Foreign Wars (Kansas Speedway, July 2006).

Kinser was replaced in the truck by Clint Bowyer at New Hampshire International Speedway in September. Kinser returned to the truck for his final 2006 NCWTS race two weeks later at Las Vegas Motor Speedway. Joe Nemechek and Bowyer were announced as replacements in the truck for the races at Talladega and Texas, respectively. Bowyer gave the team a victory at Texas. Mike Wallace drove the truck at the beginning of the season at Daytona, but crashed at the beginning of the race. Timothy Peters drove the 46 in three races, with a top ten. Erin Crocker drove the first two races for this team in 2008, followed by Scott Speed who drove the truck at Atlanta and Martinsville, followed by Landon Cassill at Mansfield and Lowe's with the godaddy.com sponsorship. Aric Almirola and Regan Smith drove in between races when Cassill was fulfilling obligations for his Nationwide Series team. Cassill had the team's best finish of the year and the final top-five as Morgan-Dollar, when he finished 3rd at the Milwaukee Mile.

After MDM's buyout by Randy Moss, 2007 Truck Series Rookie of the Year Willie Allen debuted Randy Moss Motorsports at Kentucky driving the No. 81 Rascal Flatts Chevy Silverado, with the truck number being a tribute to Moss' jersey number. Allen finished 15th in the race. Hendrick Motorsports development driver Landon Cassill scored a 14th-place finish at Kentucky and a 7th-place finish at ORP. Sprint Cup driver Jimmie Johnson made his Truck Series debut at Bristol and led 28 laps but crashed on lap 102 and finished 34th. Joe Gibbs Racing development driver Marc Davis and rookie Donny Lia completed the 2008 schedule for RMM.

Before the 2009 season, Randy Moss Motorsports with HTM signed Tayler Malsam to drive the No. 81 Toyota Tundra, after he and new teammate Mike Skinner were released from Triad Racing Technologies. In 2010, Malsam signed with the new Kyle Busch Motorsports, while RMM picked up David Starr and part-time sponsorship from Zachry. Starr was in the top 10 in points heading into the EnjoyIllinois.com 225 when RMM shut down the No. 81 team due to a lack of funding. Starr and Zachry would both leave RMM and drive the No. 81 Toyota for SS-Green Light Racing for the rest of the 2010 season. Malsam returned to the team on September 21, driving the newly numbered 25 Toyota Tundra sponsored by Exide, in a one race deal. RMM also announced that Malsam would run the full 2011 season for the team.

However, after failing to qualify at Daytona and Phoenix and suffering a bad finish at Darlington, the team withdrew from Martinsville and presumably shut down.
