= Zachry =

Zachry is an English language and Jewish surname. It is derived from the Hebrew name Zechariah, which means "God remembers." Notable people with the surname include:

- Caroline Beaumont Zachry (1894–1945), American educational psychologist
- H.B. Zachry (1901–1984), American businessman
- Pat Zachry (1952–2024), American baseball pitcher
