= Mike Clark (racing driver) =

American racing driver

Michael Clark (born May 26, 1961), is a former driver in the NASCAR Craftsman Truck Series from Danville, Indiana. Clark raced in the 1998 and 2000 seasons. His best career finish was 21st. He also failed to qualify for three races..
