= O'Reilly Auto Parts 275 =

NASCAR Craftsman Truck Series
- Venue: Heartland Park Topeka
- Corporate sponsor: O'Reilly Auto Parts
- First race: 1995
- Last race: 1999
- Distance: 275 kilometres (170.9 mi)
- Laps: 75
- Previous names: Heartland Tailgate 175 (1995); Lund Look 225 (1996); Lund Look 275K (1997–1998); O'Reilly Auto Parts 275 (1999)

The O'Reilly Auto Parts 275 was a NASCAR Craftsman Truck Series race held at the Heartland Park Topeka road course, in Topeka, Kansas. It was first held during the inaugural season for the Craftsman Truck Series in 1995, and remained a part of the series through the 1999 season. The race date fluctuated, being run in June, July, and August over the course of its existence.

Unlike most NASCAR races, the advertised distance of the race was measured in kilometers as opposed to miles and changed distance several times in its history.

== History ==
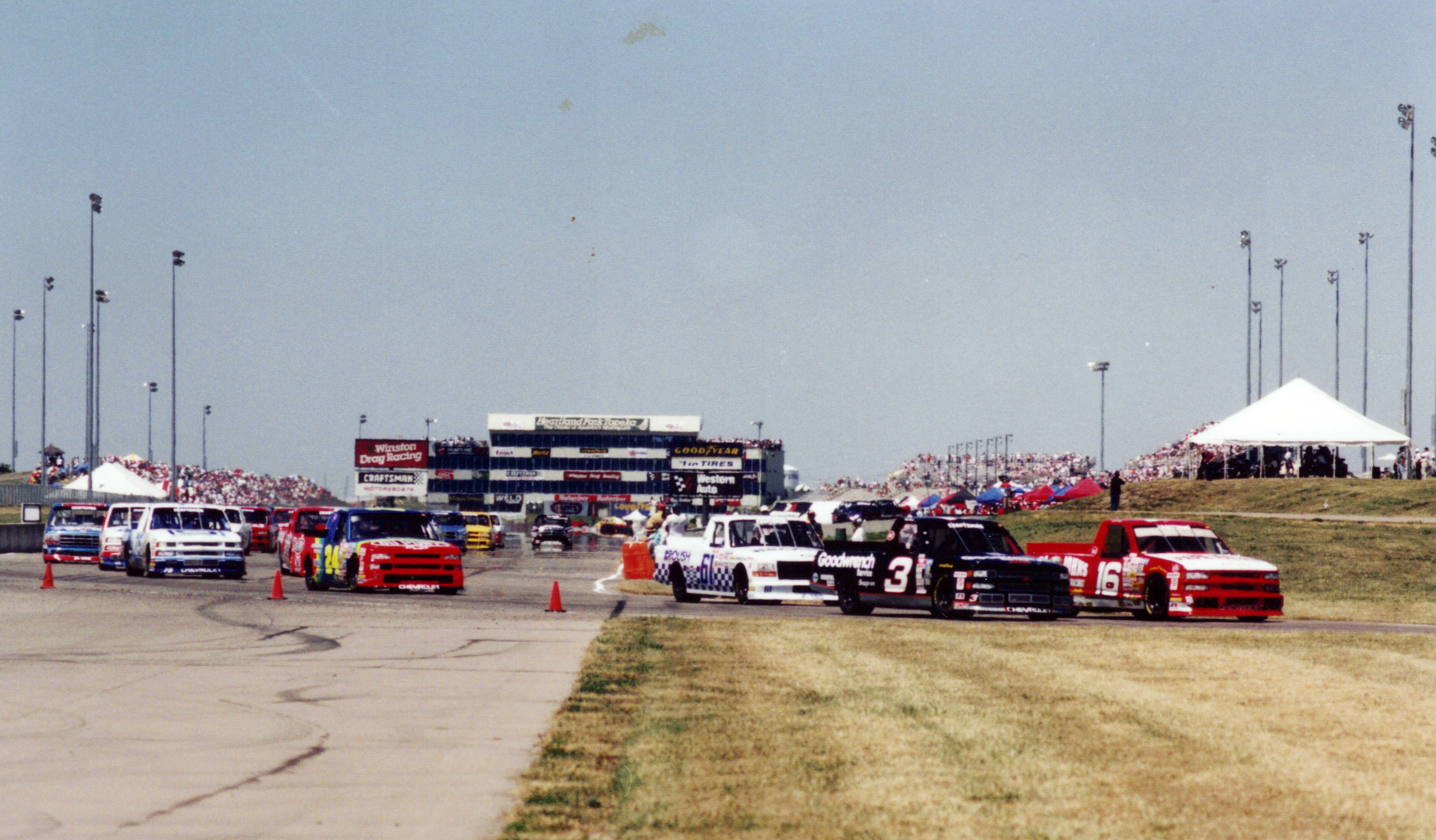
Racing during the 1995 Heartland Tailgate 175

The first race at Topeka was held on July 29, 1995, and was won by Ron Hornaday Jr. in the No. 16 Chevrolet for Dale Earnhardt, Inc., who started from the pole position and led all but two laps of the 175-kilometer (109-mile) sponsorless race. For the 1996 race, Lund Look came on as the sponsor and the distance was increased to 225 kilometers (140 miles). As in 1995, the race was dominated by one driver. This time it was Mike Skinner in the No. 3 Chevrolet for Richard Childress Racing, who led 70 of 77 laps en route to victory.

After the 1996 race, the track was reconfigured from 1.8 miles (2.9 km) to 2.1 miles (3.4 km) long and the race was increased to 275 kilometers (171 miles). The first 275-kilometer race was run in 1997 and won by Joe Ruttman in the No. 80 Ford for Roush Racing. Although Ruttman started on the pole, he led just five laps and won when leader Jay Sauter, who was trying to give the No. 3 Chevrolet its second Topeka win, ran out of gas on the final lap. The 1998 race ended in similar circumstances. The race was dominated by Tom Hubert and Mike Bliss, but both's trucks succumbed to engine failure late in the race. When Bliss' engine expired with seven laps to go, Stacy Compton, in the No. 86 Ford for Impact Motorsports, took the lead and held it to the finish.

For the final race in 1999, O'Reilly Auto Parts took over as the sponsor and six laps were removed from the distance. Mike Bliss, in the No. 99 Ford for Roush Racing, found redemption, winning the race after losing an engine in the 1998 event. He took the lead from Jay Sauter with six laps to go and became the first and only Topeka winner to win from outside the top 10 (15th). Bliss' win also made Roush Racing the only team to win twice at this track.

Topeka was dropped from the schedule in 2000 as the Truck Series shifted toward larger ovals also used by the Winston Cup Series.

== Past winners ==
| Year | Date | No. | Driver | Team | Manufacturer | Race distance | | Race time | Average speed (mph) | Ref. |
| Year | Date | No. | Driver | Team | Manufacturer | Laps | Miles (km) | Race time | Average speed (mph) | Ref. |
|---|---|---|---|---|---|---|---|---|---|---|
| 1995 | July 29 | 16 | Ron Hornaday Jr. | Dale Earnhardt, Inc. | Chevrolet | 60 | 108 (173.809) | 1:30:49 | 71.336 | |
| 1996 | June 9 | 3 | Mike Skinner | Richard Childress Racing | Chevrolet | 77 | 138.6 (223.055) | 1:42:20 | 81.264 | |
| 1997 | July 27 | 80 | Joe Ruttman | Roush Racing | Ford | 81 | 170.1 (273.749) | 2:17:07 | 74.433 | |
| 1998 | Aug 23 | 86 | Stacy Compton | Impact Motorsports | Ford | 81 | 170.1 (273.749) | 2:25:30 | 70.144 | |
| 1999 | Aug 28 | 99 | Mike Bliss | Roush Racing | Ford | 75 | 157.5 (253.471) | 2:00:16 | 78.575 | |

Race length notes

- 1995–1996: 1.8 mile course
- 1997–1999: 2.1 mile course

=== Multiple winners (teams) ===
| # Wins | Team | Years won |
|---|---|---|
| 2 | Roush Racing | 1997, 1999 |

=== Manufacturer wins ===
| # Wins | Make | Years won |
|---|---|---|
| 3 | (United States) Ford | 1997, 1998, 1999 |
| 2 | (United States) Chevrolet | 1995, 1996 |
