= NASCAR Craftsman Truck Series at Nazareth Speedway =

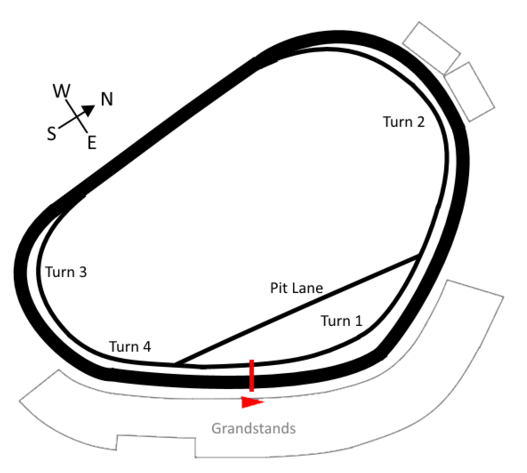

NASCAR Craftsman Truck Series
- Venue: Nazareth Speedway
- Location: Nazareth, Pennsylvania, United States
- First race: 1996
- Last race: 2001
- Distance: 200 miles (321.9 km)
- Laps: 200
- Previous names: DeVilbiss Superfinish 200 (1996); NAPA Autocare 200 (1997–1999); Chevy Silverado 200 (2000–2001)
- Most wins (driver): Jack Sprague; Greg Biffle (2)
- Most wins (team): Hendrick Motorsports; Roush Racing (2)
- Most wins (manufacturer): Chevrolet (3)

Circuit information
- Surface: Asphalt
- Length: 0.946 mi (1.522 km)
- Turns: 5

Stock car races in the NASCAR Craftsman Truck Series were held at Nazareth Speedway in Nazareth, Pennsylvania between 1996 to 2001.

Jack Sprague and Greg Biffle are the only two drivers with multiple wins in this race, both winning the event twice. After the closure of the track, the Truck series would return to racing in Pennsylvania when Pocono Raceway held the Pocono Mountains 125 in 2010.

The race in 1996 was supposed to air on CBS; however, after a 3 hour rain delay, CBS left the speedway, and the race was not broadcast.

== Past winners ==
Year	Date	No.	Driver	Team	Manufacturer	Race Distance		Race Time	Average Speed (mph)	Ref
Year	Date	No.	Driver	Team	Manufacturer	Laps	Miles (km)	Race Time	Average Speed (mph)	Ref
1996	June 30	24	Jack Sprague	Hendrick Motorsports	Chevrolet	*152	152 (245)	1:31:53	99.256	
1997	June 29	24	Jack Sprague	Hendrick Motorsports	Chevrolet	200	200 (321.868)	2:10:00	92.308	
1998	July 12	16	Ron Hornaday Jr.	Dale Earnhardt, Inc.	Chevrolet	200	200 (321.868)	2:09:52	92.402	
1999	July 18	50	Greg Biffle	Roush Racing	Ford	200	200 (321.868)	2:05:07	95.91	
2000	July 15	1	Dennis Setzer	K Automotive Racing	Dodge	200	200 (321.868)	2:08:55	93.083	
2001	August 26	99	Greg Biffle	Roush Racing	Ford	200	200 (321.868)	1:50:19	108.778	

- 1996: Race shortened due to rain.
