= 2006 Sharpie Mini 300 =

Race details
- Map of Speedway
- Date: March 25, 2006
- Official name: 2006 Sharpie Mini 300
- Location: Bristol Motor Speedway in Bristol, Tennessee
- Course: Short Track
- Course length: 0.533 miles (0.858 km)
- Distance: 300 laps, 160 mi (257 km)
- Weather: Cloudy
- Average speed: 71.606 mph (115.239 km/h)
- Attendance: 110,000

Pole position
Driver	Kevin Harvick	Richard Childress Racing
- Time: No qualifying

Most laps led
Driver	Kevin Harvick	Richard Childress Racing
- Laps: 120

Winner
No. 5	Kyle Busch	Hendrick Motorsports

Television in the United States
- Network: Fox
- Announcers: Mike Joy, Larry McReynolds, Darrell Waltrip

The 2006 Sharpie Mini 300 was a NASCAR Busch Series race held at Bristol Motor Speedway in Bristol, Tennessee on March 25, 2006. The race was the 6th of the 2006 NASCAR Busch Series and the 24th iteration of the event. The race was once again dominated by Cup Series regulars. Kevin Harvick won the pole and led the most laps at 120 but it was Kyle Busch who would win his first ever Busch Series race at Bristol. But the race was most remembered when Snow fell onto the track during the race that caused a long red flag and would become one of the most remembered red flagged events and one of the craziest weather events in NASCAR history.

== Background ==
The Bristol Motor Speedway, formerly known as Bristol International Raceway and Bristol Raceway, is a NASCAR short track venue located in Bristol, Tennessee. Constructed in 1960, it held its first NASCAR race on July 30, 1961. Despite its short length, Bristol is among the most popular tracks on the NASCAR schedule because of its distinct features, which include extraordinarily steep banking, an all concrete surface, two pit roads, and stadium-like seating. It has also been named one of the loudest NASCAR tracks.

== Entry list ==
- (R) denotes rookie driver

#	Driver	Team	Make
00	Johnny Sauter	Haas CNC Racing	Chevrolet
0	Kertus Davis	Davis Motorsports	Chevrolet
01	Jay Sauter	Duesenberg & Leik Motorsports	Chevrolet
1	Jason Keller	Phoenix Racing	Dodge
2	Clint Bowyer	Richard Childress Racing	Chevrolet
4	Mark Green	Biagi Brothers Racing	Dodge
05	Brad Teague	Day Enterprise Racing	Chevrolet
5	Kyle Busch	Hendrick Motorsports	Chevrolet
06	Todd Kluever (R)	Roush Racing	Ford
9	Scott Riggs	Evernham Motorsports	Dodge
10	John Andretti (R)	ppc Racing	Ford
11	Paul Menard	Dale Earnhardt Inc.	Chevrolet
12	Joel Kauffman (R)	FitzBradshaw Racing	Dodge
14	Tracy Hines (R)	FitzBradshaw Racing	Dodge
16	Greg Biffle	Roush Racing	Ford
17	Matt Kenseth	Roush Racing	Ford
18	J. J. Yeley	Joe Gibbs Racing	Chevrolet
20	Denny Hamlin	Joe Gibbs Racing	Chevrolet
21	Kevin Harvick	Richard Childress Racing	Chevrolet
22	Kenny Wallace	ppc Racing	Ford
23	Chris Wimmer (R)	Keith Coleman Racing	Chevrolet
25	Ashton Lewis Jr.	Team Rensi Motorsports	Ford
27	David Green	Brewco Motorsports	Ford
28	Shane Hall	Jay Robinson Racing	Ford
32	Jason Leffler	Braun-Akins Racing	Chevrolet
33	Ron Hornaday Jr.	Kevin Harvick Inc.	Chevrolet
34	Mike Bliss	Frank Cicci Racing	Chevrolet
35	Regan Smith	Team Rensi Motorsports	Ford
36	Tim Sauter	McGill Motorsports	Chevrolet
38	A. J. Foyt IV (R)	Braun-Akins Racing	Dodge
41	Reed Sorenson	Chip Ganassi Racing	Dodge
43	Aaron Fike	Curb Agajanian Performance Group	Dodge
47	Jon Wood	Wood Brothers Racing/JTG Racing	Ford
49	Jorge Goeters (R)	Jay Robinson Racing	Ford
50	Danny O'Quinn Jr. (R)	Roush Racing	Ford
56	Kevin Lepage	Mac Hill Motorsports	Chevrolet
58	Kevin Conway	Carver Racing	Dodge
59	Stacy Compton	Wood Brothers Racing/JTG Racing	Ford
60	Carl Edwards	Roush Racing	Ford
64	Steve Wallace (R)	Rusty Wallace Inc.	Dodge
66	Ken Schrader	Brewco Motorsports	Ford
72	Jerry Robertson	MacDonald Motorsports	Chevrolet
75	Caleb Holman	Henderson Motorsports	Chevrolet
77	Burney Lamar (R)	Kevin Harvick Inc.	Chevrolet
88	Mark McFarland (R)	JR Motorsports	Chevrolet
90	Matt McCall	Robert Yates Racing	Ford
99	Michael Waltrip	Michael Waltrip Racing	Dodge
Official Entry list

== Qualifying ==
Kevin Harvick won the pole after qualifying was cancelled due to snow falling. The starting grid would go by points standings.

Grid	No.	Driver	Team	Manufacturer
1	21	Kevin Harvick	Richard Childress Racing	Chevrolet
2	18	J. J. Yeley	Joe Gibbs Racing	Chevrolet
3	64	Steve Wallace (R)	Rusty Wallace Inc.	Dodge
4	2	Clint Bowyer	Richard Childress Racing	Chevrolet
5	9	Scott Riggs	Evernham Motorsports	Dodge
6	33	Ron Hornaday	Kevin Harvick Inc.	Chevrolet
7	20	Denny Hamlin	Joe Gibbs Racing	Chevrolet
8	32	Jason Leffler	Braun-Akins Racing	Chevrolet
9	60	Carl Edwards	Roush Racing	Ford
10	77	Burney Lamar (R)	Kevin Harvick Inc.	Chevrolet
11	47	Jon Wood	Wood Brothers/JTG Racing	Ford
12	16	Greg Biffle	Roush Racing	Ford
13	00	Johnny Sauter	Haas CNC Racing	Chevrolet
14	25	Ashton Lewis	Team Rensi Motorsports	Ford
15	1	Jason Keller	Phoenix Racing	Dodge
16	11	Paul Menard	Dale Earnhardt Inc.	Chevrolet
17	06	Todd Kluever (R)	Roush Racing	Ford
18	41	Reed Sorenson	Chip Ganassi Racing	Dodge
19	88	Mark McFarland (R)	JR Motorsports	Chevrolet
20	5	Kyle Busch	Hendrick Motorsports	Chevrolet
21	90	Matt McCall	Robert Yates Racing	Ford
22	17	Matt Kenseth	Roush Racing	Ford
23	22	Kenny Wallace	ppc Racing	Ford
24	66	Ken Schrader	Brewco Motorsports	Ford
25	35	Regan Smith	Team Rensi Motorsports	Ford
26	50	Danny O'Quinn Jr. (R)	Roush Racing	Ford
27	99	Michael Waltrip	Michael Waltrip Racing	Dodge
28	10	John Andretti (R)	ppc Racing	Ford
29	14	Tracy Hines (R)	FitzBradshaw Racing	Dodge
30	36	Tim Sauter	McGill Motorsports	Chevrolet
31	4	Mark Green	Biagi Brothers Racing	Dodge
32	59	Stacy Compton	Wood Brothers/JTG Racing	Ford
33	58	Kevin Conway	Carver Racing	Dodge
34	27	David Green	Brewco Motorsports	Ford
35	12	Joel Kauffman (R)	FitzBradshaw Racing	Dodge
36	38	A. J. Foyt IV (R)	Braun-Akins Racing	Dodge
37	01	Jay Sauter	Duesenberg & Leik Motorsports	Chevrolet
38	43	Aaron Fike	Curb Agajanian Performance Group	Dodge
39	34	Mike Bliss	Frank Cicci Racing	Chevrolet
40	49	Jorge Goeters (R)	Jay Robinson Racing	Ford
41	0	Kertus Davis	Davis Motorsports	Chevrolet
42	23	Chris Wimmer (R)	Keith Coleman Racing	Chevrolet
43	56	Kevin Lepage	Mac Hill Motorsports	Chevrolet
Failed to Qualify, driver changes, or withdrew
44	75	Caleb Holman	Henderson Motorsports	Chevrolet
45	05	Brad Teague	Day Enterprise Racing	Chevrolet
46	72	Jerry Robertson	MacDonald Motorsports	Chevrolet
47	28	Shane Hall	Jay Robinson Racing	Ford
Official Starting grid

== Race ==
Pole sitter Kevin Harvick led the first lap of the race. On lap 3, Steve Wallace, who was 18 years old and making his second career Busch Series start, took the lead from Harvick. But on lap 6, Harvick took the lead from the 18 year old Wallace. On lap 8, the first caution flew when Kevin Conway crashed in turns 3 and 4 after he got bumped from behind by David Green. The race restarted on lap 16. On lap 20, rookie Todd Kluever would be involved in his first of three incidents of the day in what would become a bad day for Kluever after Kluever tried to sneak under Jason Keller in turn 4 but slid up the track into Keller and both would lose momentum and lose positions while Kluever hit the wall on the frontstretch. On lap 21, the second caution flew when Steve Wallace spun off of turn 4 after contact with Scott Riggs. The race would restart on lap 28 with Kevin Harvick still as the leader.

=== Snow starts falling and red flag ===
On around lap 29, snow started to fall onto the track. The snow would reduce the grip on the track causing cars to slide. Eventually, the third caution flew on lap 30 when Todd Kluever's bad day would continue as Kluever's car lost grip and spun all by itself off of turn four down the frontstretch on the slippery track. While Kluever spun, Ron Hornaday got bumped from behind by Clint Bowyer in almost the same area where Kluever spun causing Hornaday to spin down the frontstretch. Hornaday did a full 360 degree spin and got going again like nothing ever happened. On lap 33, the red flag was shown to dry the track and wait for the snow to stop. During the red flag, drivers, crews, and even the fans in the stands began to have fun in the snow as they made snow angels, had snowball fights, and built snowman. Kyle Busch and his crew began launching snowballs into the stands at the fans including Tony Stewart. Other crew members such as the crew guys of David Green, Stacy Compton, and Aaron Fike were seen chucking snowballs towards the stands from pit road. Reed Sorenson's crew began building a snowman during the red flag. Drivers also found the time to mess with the Fox reporters when Kevin Harvick tried to blind Matt Yocum with his umbrella before Yocum stopped him in the process. Next to Yocum and Harvick, the crew members of Mark McFarland and J. J. Yeley had a snowball fight against each other. One of Burney Lamar's crew guys began taunting the fans to hit him as fans threw snowballs on the track and one fan did hit him right at the top of his helmet and he pointed out the fan as if he's saying "good throw." The sound guys in the booth of Bristol also found some humor of their own. While Dick Berggren was interviewing Scott Riggs, the PA system was playing the Christmas song Rudolph the Red-Nosed Reindeer by Johnny Marks even though Christmas was exactly 4 months ago. While Michael Waltrip was about to get interviewed by Steve Byrnes, fans began throwing snowballs towards Waltrip's way. Waltrip defended the snowballs away with his umbrella like he was in a gladiator war while Byrnes was interviewing him with a few close calls as the snowballs almost hit Waltrip and Byrnes. A fan even found a small rock and threw it at Waltrip's way and it bounced off Waltrip's umbrella and Waltrip was surprised saying "golly that was a rock?!" at the end of his interview. Before Matt Yocum was about to interview Carl Edwards, Edwards drilled Yocum in the face with a snowball. Edwards apologized to Yocum during his interview saying he meant to get him in the shoulder. The crew guys of Mark Green even decided to play some baseball with the snowballs with one pitching and one hitting. While Edwards was getting interviewed by Yocum, the sun began to come out, the snow stopped, and track was starting to dry. Soon, drivers were ordered to get in their cars. While they were getting in their cars, Harvick decided to jokingly taunt Kenny Wallace, who was parked right next to Harvick, and Harvick said something to Wallace that made Wallace laugh hysterically at Harvick. The red flag was soon lifted after an 80-minute red flag. Before the cars started again, Fox decided to post a "Snow Delay Summary" that said "12 drivers interviewed, 1 Kenny Wallace interview (4:40; shortest time ever), 3 Snowball fights, 1 snowman built, 1 Director's text message, 1 bad Jamie McMurray "throw.""

=== Restart of race ===
Kevin Harvick led the field and the race restarted on lap 40 of the race. On lap 61, the fourth caution would fly when Burney Lamar spun in turn 2 after getting bumped by Ken Schrader. Behind them, Joel Kauffman spun after contact with another car. Many cars pitted including Harvick but Michael Waltrip, Denny Hamlin, Paul Menard, and Joel Kauffman did not pit and Waltrip led the field to the restart on lap 71. On lap 89, Kevin Harvick took the lead from Waltrip. On lap 97, the 5th caution flew when Joel Kauffman crashed on the backstretch after contact with Ashton Lewis. The race would restart on lap 102 with Harvick still leading. On lap 112, the 6th caution flew for debris when the exhausts flew out of A. J. Foyt IV's car. The race would restart on lap 120 with Harvick leading. During the restart, Denny Hamlin attempted to take the lead from Harvick but couldn't. On lap 123, the 7th caution flew for a 3 car crash in turn 2 involving Mike Bliss, Mark McFarland, and Mike McCall after McFarland spun after contact from Ashton Lewis. The race would restart on lap 130. On lap 141, the 8th caution would fly when Mike McCall spun after contact with the slower car in Joel Kauffman. Denny Hamlin would be the new race leader and he led the field to the restart on lap 148. On lap 176, Greg Biffle took the lead from Hamlin. On lap 193, the 9th caution flew when Jason Leffler blew a right front tire and crashed in turn 4. Carl Edwards was the new race leader and he led the field to the restart on lap 199. On lap 226, the 10th caution would fly for debris. The race would restart on lap 232. On lap 234, the 11th caution would fly for a 4 car crash in turn 2. It started when Ashton Lewis got into Clint Bowyer sending both cars sideways. Lewis then tagged Johnny Sauter sending Sauter sideways and sending cars crashing behind them with those being Paul Menard, Regan Smith, J. J. Yeley, and Chris Wimmer.

=== Final laps ===
The race would restart on lap 242. On lap 244, the 12th caution would fly when Tracy Hines, Reed Sorenson, and Clint Bowyer all crashed in turn 2. The race would restart on lap 250. With 41 laps to go, Greg Biffle took the lead from Carl Edwards. With 32 to go, the 12th and final caution would fly when Todd Kluever's bad day would continue after Kluever hit the wall after contact from Steve Wallace. The race would restart with 27 laps to go. Kyle Busch was all over the rear bumper of Greg Biffle but with 22 to go, Biffle started to pull away. But Busch would soon close in on the rear bumper of Biffle with 15 to go. With 12 to go, Busch passed Biffle for the lead with Harvick right behind Busch. Harvick tried to pull the bump and run on Busch in the last 11 laps but couldn't and Kyle Busch would win his first ever Busch Series race at Bristol and Harvick would finish in 2nd. Matt Kenseth, Denny Hamlin, and Carl Edwards rounded out the top 5 while Scott Riggs, Ron Hornaday, Kenny Wallace, John Andretti, and Johnny Sauter rounded out the top 10.

In the Cup Series race the following day, Kyle's brother Kurt Busch would win and Kurt would celebrate by doing snow angels on the start finish line as if he was in the Busch Series race in the snow.

== Race results ==
Pos	Car	Driver	Team	Manufacturer	Laps Run	Laps Led	Status	Points
1	5	Kyle Busch	Hendrick Motorsports	Chevrolet	300	12	running	185
2	21	Kevin Harvick	Richard Childress Racing	Chevrolet	300	120	running	180
3	17	Matt Kenseth	Roush Racing	Ford	300	0	running	165
4	20	Denny Hamlin	Joe Gibbs Racing	Chevrolet	300	29	running	165
5	60	Carl Edwards	Roush Racing	Ford	300	65	running	160
6	9	Scott Riggs	Evernham Motorsports	Dodge	300	0	running	150
7	33	Ron Hornaday	Kevin Harvick Inc.	Chevrolet	300	0	running	146
8	22	Kenny Wallace	ppi Racing	Ford	300	0	running	142
9	10	John Andretti (R)	ppi Racing	Ford	300	0	running	138
10	00	Johnny Sauter	Haas CNC Racing	Chevrolet	300	0	running	134
11	50	Danny O'Quinn Jr. (R)	Roush Racing	Ford	300	0	running	130
12	2	Clint Bowyer	Richard Childress Racing	Chevrolet	300	0	running	127
13	14	Tracy Hines (R)	FitzBradshaw Racing	Dodge	300	0	running	124
14	59	Stacy Compton	Wood Brothers/JTG Racing	Ford	300	0	running	121
15	1	Jason Keller	Phoenix Racing	Dodge	300	0	running	118
16	11	Paul Menard	Dale Earnhardt Inc.	Chevrolet	300	0	running	115
17	47	Jon Wood	Wood Brothers/JTG Racing	Ford	300	0	running	112
18	43	Aaron Fike	Curb Agajanian Performance Group	Dodge	300	0	running	109
19	56	Kevin Lepage	Mac Hill Motorsports	Chevrolet	300	0	running	106
20	77	Burney Lamar (R)	Kevin Harvick Inc.	Chevrolet	300	0	running	103
21	36	Tim Sauter	McGill Motorsports	Chevrolet	300	0	running	100
22	4	Mark Green	Biagi Brothers Racing	Dodge	300	0	running	97
23	01	Jay Sauter	Duesenberg & Leik Motorsports	Chevrolet	299	0	running	94
24	90	Matt McCall	Robert Yates Racing	Ford	299	0	running	91
25	27	David Green	Brewco Motorsports	Ford	299	0	running	88
26	99	Michael Waltrip	Michael Waltrip Racing	Dodge	299	23	running	90
27	41	Reed Sorenson	Chip Ganassi Racing	Dodge	298	0	running	82
28	16	Greg Biffle	Roush Racing	Ford	298	48	running	84
29	18	J. J. Yeley	Joe Gibbs Racing	Chevrolet	298	0	running	76
30	25	Ashton Lewis	Team Rensi Motorsports	Ford	296	0	running	73
31	88	Mark McFarland (R)	JR Motorsports	Chevrolet	290	0	running	70
32	32	Jason Leffler	Braun-Akins Racing	Chevrolet	289	0	running	67
33	64	Steve Wallace (R)	Rusty Wallace Inc.	Dodge	288	3	running	69
34	06	Todd Kluever (R)	Roush Racing	Ford	262	0	crash	61
35	38	A. J. Foyt IV (R)	Braun-Akins Racing	Dodge	257	0	running	58
36	34	Mike Bliss	Frank Cicci Racing	Chevrolet	237	0	running	55
37	66	Ken Schrader	Brewco Motorsports	Ford	237	0	running	52
38	35	Regan Smith	Team Rensi Motorsports	Ford	233	0	crash	49
39	23	Chris Wimmer (R)	Keith Coleman Racing	Chevrolet	195	0	crash	46
40	0	Kertus Davis	Davis Motorsports	Chevrolet	175	0	engine	43
41	49	Jorge Goeters (R)	Jay Robinson Racing	Ford	167	0	too slow	40
42	12	Joel Kauffman (R)	FitzBradshaw Racing	Dodge	128	0	crash	37
43	58	Kevin Conway	Carver Racing	Dodge	6	0	crash	34
Official Race results

Previous race: 2006 Nicorette 300	NASCAR Busch Series; 2006 season	Next race: 2006 O'Reilly 300
