= Brian Sockwell =

American racing driver (born 1968)

- Born: June 7, 1968 (age 58); Brown Summit, North Carolina, U.S.

NASCAR O'Reilly Auto Parts Series career
- 4 races run over 2 years
- Best finish: 100th (2004)
- First race: 2004 Goulds Pumps ITT Industries 200 (Nazareth)
- Last race: 2005 Sam's Town 250 (Memphis)
Wins	Top tens	Poles
0	0	0

NASCAR FedEx Freight Truck Series career
- 22 races run over 6 years
- Best finish: 45th (1999)
- First race: 1999 Florida Dodge Dealers 400K (Homestead)
- Last race: 2008 North Carolina Education Lottery 200 (Charlotte)
Wins	Top tens	Poles
0	0	0

Brian Sockwell (born June 7, 1968) is an American professional stock car racing driver.

== Early racing career ==
Sockwell raced in the Goody's Dash Series for several years, earning several wins. In 1997, he came close to winning the Goody's Dash Series championship, but was edged out by 138 points by Mike Swaim Jr.

== 2002–2004 ==
In 2002, Sockwell came back to the No. 54 Chevy sponsored by Maddux Supply Co. and later Lowdermilk Electric.

In his first season in the Busch Series, Sockwell went to the No. 94 Chevy sponsored by RaceApe.com. Later in the season, he moved to the No. 41 Chevy sponsored by cashwell.com.

== 2005–present ==
In his only race of the 2005 season, the Sam's Town 250, Sockwell went to the No. 88 Reary Racing Chevy.

In 2010, Sockwell raced at Charlotte Motor Speedway winning the Legends Millions- Masters division.

== Personal life ==
He has a wife named Janet and a daughter.

== Motorsports career results ==
=== NASCAR ===
(key) (Bold - Pole position awarded by qualifying time. Italics - Pole position earned by points standings or practice time. * – Most laps led.)

==== Busch Series ====
NASCAR Busch Series results
Year	Team	No.	Make	1	2	3	4	5	6	7	8	9	10	11	12	13	14	15	16	17	18	19	20	21	22	23	24	25	26	27	28	29	30	31	32	33	34	35	NBSC	Pts	Ref
2004	PF2 Motorsports	94	Chevy	DAY	CAR	LVS	DAR	BRI	TEX	NSH	TAL	CAL	GTY	RCH	NZH; 28																								100th	161	
2004	Reary Racing	41	Chevy													CLT; 30	DOV	NSH	KEN	MLW	DAY	CHI	NHA	PPR	IRP	MCH	BRI	CAL	RCH; 27	DOV	KAN								100th	161	
2004	Reary Racing	40	Chevy																													CLT; DNQ	MEM	ATL	PHO	DAR	HOM		100th	161	
2005	Reary Racing	88	Chevy	DAY	CAL	MXC	LVS	ATL	NSH; DNQ	BRI	TEX	PHO	TAL	DAR	RCH	CLT; DNQ	DOV	NSH	KEN	MLW	DAY	CHI	NHA	PPR	GTY	IRP	GLN	MCH	BRI	CAL	RCH; DNQ	DOV	KAN	CLT	MEM; 30	TEX	PHO	HOM	123rd	73	

==== Craftsman Truck Series ====
NASCAR Craftsman Truck Series results
Year	Team	No.	Make	1	2	3	4	5	6	7	8	9	10	11	12	13	14	15	16	17	18	19	20	21	22	23	24	25	26	27	NCTC	Pts	Ref
1998	Sasser-Fogleman Racing, Inc.	30	Chevy	WDW	HOM	PHO	POR	EVG	I70	GLN	TEX	BRI	MLW	NZH	CAL	PPR	IRP	NHA	FLM	NSV	HPT	LVL	RCH; DNQ	MEM	GTY	MAR	SON	MMR	PHO	LVS	127th	25	
1999	Sockwell Racing	54	Chevy	HOM; 12	PHO	EVG	MMR	MAR; DNQ	MEM; 34	PPR	I70	BRI	TEX	PIR	GLN	MLW	NSV	NZH	MCH	NHA	IRP	GTY; 23	HPT	RCH; DNQ	LVS	LVL	TEX	CAL			45th	380	
2000	Sockwell Racing	54	Chevy	DAY; DNQ	HOM	PHO	MMR	MAR; 27	PIR	GTY	MEM; 35	PPR	EVG	TEX	KEN	GLN	MLW	NHA	NZH	MCH	IRP	NSV	CIC; 11	RCH; DNQ	DOV	TEX; 24	CAL				50th	435	
2001	Sockwell Racing	54	Chevy	DAY; 17	HOM	MMR	MAR; DNQ	GTY	DAR	PPR	DOV																				51st	465	
2001	Richardson Motorsports	0	Chevy									TEX; 35	MEM	MLW																	51st	465	
2001	Rick Ware Racing	81	Chevy												KAN; 33	KEN; 28	NHA	IRP	NSH	CIC	NZH	RCH	SBO								51st	465	
2001	Rick Ware Racing	71	Chevy																					TEX; 21	LVS	PHO	CAL				51st	465	
2002	Sockwell Racing	54	Chevy	DAY; 15	DAR	MAR; DNQ	GTY	PPR	DOV	TEX	MEM; 22	MLW	KAN	KEN	NHA	MCH	IRP	NSH	RCH; 21	TEX	SBO; 31	LVS	CAL	PHO	HOM; 29						47th	391	
2003	Sockwell Racing	54	Chevy	DAY; 28	DAR	MMR	MAR	CLT; 24	DOV	TEX	MEM	MLW	KAN	KEN	GTW	MCH	IRP; 19	NSH	BRI												61st	346	
2003	Rick Ware Racing	51	Dodge																	RCH; DNQ	NHA	CAL	LVS	SBO	TEX						61st	346	
2003	Rick Ware Racing	5	Chevy																							MAR; 31	PHO	HOM			61st	346	
2007	Reary Racing	54	Dodge	DAY	CAL	ATL	MAR; DNQ	KAN	CLT	MFD	DOV	TEX	MCH	MLW	MEM	KEN	IRP	NSH	BRI; DNQ	GTW	NHA	LVS	TAL	MAR	ATL	TEX	PHO	HOM			N/A	-	
2008	Reary Racing	54	Chevy	DAY; DNQ	CAL	ATL	MAR	KAN	CLT; 29	MFD	DOV	TEX	MCH	MLW	MEM	KEN	IRP	NSH	BRI	GTW	NHA	LVS	TAL	MAR	ATL	TEX	PHO	HOM			93rd	76	

==== Goody's Dash Series ====
NASCAR Goody's Dash Series results
Year	Team	No.	Make	1	2	3	4	5	6	7	8	9	10	11	12	13	14	15	16	17	18	19	20	21	NGDS	Pts	Ref
1996	Sockwell Racing	54	Pontiac	DAY	HOM; 33	MYB; 8	SUM; 9	NSV; 18	TRI; 10	CAR; 6	HCY; 14	FLO; 14	BRI; 24	SUM; 6	GRE	SNM; 8	BGS	MYB; 30	LAN	STH	FLO; 18	NWS; 11	VOL; 7	HCY; 7	15th	1966	
1997	Sockwell Racing	54	Pontiac	DAY; 1	HOM; 19	KIN; 24	**MYB**; 7	LAN; 7	CAR; 9	TRI; 3	FLO; 22	HCY; 4	BRI; 1	GRE; 4	**SNM**; 6	CLT; 2	**MYB**; 1**	**LAN**; 1*	SUM; 1*	**STA**; 3	HCY; 3	USA; 31	CON; 3	HOM; 2	2nd	3154	
1998	Sockwell Racing	54	Pontiac	DAY; 29	HCY	CAR	CLT	TRI	LAN	BRI	SUM	GRE	ROU	SNM	MYB	CON	HCY	LAN	STA	LOU	VOL	USA	HOM		85th	76	
2000	N/A	16	Pontiac	DAY; 15	MON	STA	JAC	CAR	CLT	SBO	ROU	LOU	SUM	GRE	SNM	MYB	BRI	HCY	JAC	USA	LAN				66th	118	
