= Kevin Cywinski =

American stock car racing driver

- Born: March 16, 1965 (age 61); Mosinee, Wisconsin, U.S.
- Awards: 1995 ARTGO champion 1997 American Speed Association champion 2003 American Speed Association champion 2004 American Speed Association champion

NASCAR O'Reilly Auto Parts Series career
- 2 races run over 1 year
- Best finish: 76th (1998)
- First race: 1998 Galaxy Food Centers 300 (Hickory)
- Last race: 1998 Hardee's 250 (Richmond)
Wins	Top tens	Poles
0	0	0

NASCAR FedEx Freight Truck Series career
- 46 races run over 3 years
- Best finish: 16th (1999)
- First race: 1997 Cummins 200 (IRP)
- Last race: 1999 NAPA Auto Parts 200 (California)
Wins	Top tens	Poles
0	8	0

Kevin Cywinski (born March 16, 1965) is an American former NASCAR driver. He competed in the Craftsman Truck Series full-time in 1998 and 1999, as well as some races in the Busch Series. After leaving NASCAR, he went back down to the short-track ranks. He won the ASA championship series in 2004. He was the co-owner of Win-Tron Racing before merging with AM Racing in 2021 and becoming the operator of the organization.

== Craftsman Truck Series ==
Cywinski made his debut in this series in 1997, when he competed in the No. 18 Dana Holding Corporation Dodge. His first race was at ORP, where Cywinski started 21st and finished a respectable 20th. Later in the year, Cywinski started 20th at Mesa Marin and came home with a solid 15th-place finish.

Those runs attracted the eyes of Bob Brevak, who hired Cywinski after released Tony Roper midway through 1998. Cywinski got right on it, earning an eighth-place finish in his first outing with the team at Bristol. However, Cywinski struggled for the rest of the year, only recording five top-20 finishes in nineteen races. Cywinski did not finish nine races, but seven of those were mechanical failure. Still, they did not help the team. The main highlight of Cywinski's year was winning the outside pole at Flemington. This was all en route to a 28th-place finish in points.

Brevak stood with Cywinski and his trust was greatly paid in 1999, as Cywinski roared to a 16th-place finish in points after two top-fives and seven top-tens. His best run of the season was a third at Bristol, followed closely by a fourth at Martinsville and the other five top-tens. Cywinski would have proved to be a bigger threat in the points, but his team struggled at some tracks, posting a season average 17.8 finish.

Cywinski left after the year was up to go back short track racing and was replaced by John Young.

== Busch Series ==
Cywinski made two career starts in this series, both coming in 1998. Cywinski debuted in the Ruark Racing No. 89 Chevy at Hickory. The short track ace qualified the car in 29th, but steadily improved to 19th in the final showing. Key Motorsports was the team that Cywinski drove for next at Richmond. He started that event in 19th, but slid to 25th in the final rundown.

== Motorsports career results ==
=== NASCAR ===
(key) (Bold – Pole position awarded by qualifying time. Italics – Pole position earned by points standings or practice time. * – Most laps led.)

==== Busch Series ====
NASCAR Busch Series results
Year	Team	No.	Make	1	2	3	4	5	6	7	8	9	10	11	12	13	14	15	16	17	18	19	20	21	22	23	24	25	26	27	28	29	30	31	NBSC	Pts	Ref
1998	Key Motorsports	11	Ford	DAY	CAR; DNQ	LVS	NSV	DAR	BRI	TEX							RCH; 25	PPR	GLN	MLW	MYB	CAL	SBO	IRP	MCH	BRI	DAR	RCH	DOV	CLT	GTY	CAR	ATL	HOM	76th	194	
1998	NorthStar Motorsports	89	Ford								HCY; 19	TAL	NHA	NZH	CLT	DOV																			76th	194	

==== Craftsman Truck Series ====
NASCAR Craftsman Truck Series results
Year	Team	No.	Make	1	2	3	4	5	6	7	8	9	10	11	12	13	14	15	16	17	18	19	20	21	22	23	24	25	26	27	NCTC	Pts	Ref
1997	Roehrig Motorsports	18	Dodge	WDW	TUS	HOM	PHO	POR	EVG	I70	NHA	TEX	BRI	NZH	MLW	LVL	CNS	HPT	IRP; 20	FLM	NSV	GLN	RCH	MAR	SON	MMR; 15	CAL	PHO	LVS; DNQ		75th	246	
1998	Brevak Racing	31	Ford	WDW	HOM	PHO	POR	EVG	I70	GLN	TEX	BRI; 8	MLW; 33	NZH; 32	CAL; 23	PPR; 19	IRP; 22	NHA; 24	FLM; 18	NSV; 20	HPT; 11	LVL; 28	RCH; 29	MEM; 32	GTY; 29	MAR; 30	SON; 25	MMR; 22	PHO; 32	LVS; 21	28th	1726	
1999	Brevak Racing	31	Ford	HOM; 6	PHO; 9	EVG; 15	MMR; 10	MAR; 4	MEM; 26	PPR; 12	I70; 6	BRI; 3	TEX; 21	PIR; 24	GLN; 24	MLW; 18	NSV; 10	NZH; 23	MCH; 31	NHA; 19	IRP; 15	GTY; 11	HPT; 27	RCH; 25	LVS; 21	LVL; 24	TEX; 27	CAL; 33			16th	2777	

Sporting positions
Preceded by Tony Raines	ASA National Tour Champion; 1997	Succeeded by Gary St. Amant
Preceded by Joey Clanton	ASA National Tour Champion; 2003, 2004	Succeeded by Bryan Reffner
Preceded by Steve Carlson	ARTGO Challenge Series Champion; 1995	Succeeded by Steve Carlson
