= 2000 Daytona 250 =

Auto race held at Daytona International Speedway in 2000

Race details
- Race 1 of 24 in the 2000 NASCAR Craftsman Truck Series season
- Track map of Daytona International Speedway.
- Date: February 18, 2000
- Location: Daytona International Speedway, Daytona Beach, Florida
- Course: Permanent racing facility
- Course length: 2.5 miles (4.02336 km)
- Distance: 100 laps, 250 mi (402.336 km)
- Weather: Temperatures reaching up to 79 °F (26 °C); wind speeds approaching 20 miles per hour (32 km/h)
- Average speed: 130.152 miles per hour (209.459 km/h)

Pole position
Driver	Joe Ruttman	Bobby Hamilton Racing

Most laps led
Driver	Mike Wallace	Ultra Motorsports
- Laps: 59

Winner
No. 2	Mike Wallace	Ultra Motorsports

Television in the United States
- Network: ESPN; ESPN2
- Announcers: Marty Reid; Benny Parsons; Ray Evernham

The 2000 Daytona 250 was a NASCAR Craftsman Truck Series race held at Daytona International Speedway in Daytona Beach, Florida on February 18, 2000. The inaugural running of the event, Joe Ruttman won the pole, while Mike Wallace won the race, the third win of his Truck Series career.

A quarter of this race was held under the caution flag, partially due to Geoff Bodine's violent crash near the start/finish line on lap 57.

== Background ==
Daytona International Speedway is one of two superspeedways to hold Camping World Truck Series races; the other one is Talladega Superspeedway. Its standard track is a four-turn, 2.5-mile (4.0 km) superspeedway. Daytona's turns are banked at 31 degrees, and the front stretch (the location of the finish line) is banked at 18 degrees.

== Race summary ==
=== Start ===
Joe Ruttman, driving the No. 18 for Bobby Hamilton Racing, was on the pole. He would lead the field to the green flag and led the first lap before Lyndon Amick briefly took the lead for two laps. The lead would then switch between Andy Houston, Mike Wallace, and Bobby Hamilton before the first caution came out for a crash in Turn 2, which began when Geoff Bodine spun after making contact by Amick. Defending Truck champion Jack Sprague, Steve Grissom, Rick Crawford, and Bryan Reffner were also involved. The race restarted, and the lead was taken by a couple more drivers before the second caution came out when Mike Cope cut a tire and spun in turn 4. At the restart, Terry Cook was the leader but Houston, Wallace, and Hamilton again swapped the lead. Wallace had a tire go flat and had to make a pit stop. That same lap, Kurt Busch made contact with Hamilton and spun him out in the tri-oval, collecting Ruttman, Randy Renfrow, Randy Tolsma, and Houston. Renfrow almost flipped over. Wallace managed to stay on the lead lap. The race restarted on Lap 43, and went green until lap 50 when Jimmy Kitchens spun on the backstretch. Most of the leaders made pit stops except for Rob Morgan, who stayed out.

=== Lap 57 crash ===
On the restart, Rob Morgan led but was quickly overtaken by Mike Wallace, and Morgan began slipping back. On lap 56, rookie Kurt Busch, in his Truck series debut, was racing three-wide with Geoff Bodine and Morgan. Morgan came down the track not clearing Busch thus causing himself to spin down to the flat apron and then veer back up the banking. His right-front tire contacted Bodine's left-front tire, catapulting Bodine into the catch-fence at a speed of nearly 190 miles per hour (310 km/h). Upon impact, Bodine's fuel tank exploded and the truck flipped over nine times extremely hard across the track before coming to rest on its roof in turn 1. The truck, now little more than a crushed, mangled roll cage, was struck on the driver's side by Ryan McGlynn, whose truck was damaged from the contact and retired later in the race. Instantly in the announcer's reactions, the crash was described as similar to Richard Petty's rollover crash in the 1988 Daytona 500 at a similar portion of the track. The red flag was waved as the track was blocked with debris and rescue workers rushed to Bodine's aid. The crash was so violent that the impact ripped the engine out of the truck, found in turn two 355 feet (108 m) from where Bodine's truck came to rest on its lid. The crash collected 12 more trucks.

Upon seeing the crash, the fans went silent and called for paramedics to the grandstands. However, 16 minutes later the fans applauded when they heard the announcers say that Bodine was seen talking to medical crews and that he was moving around while he was being taken to the ambulance. Bodine had suffered a broken jaw, wrist, shoulder, and a concussion. After several nights of medical treatment at the nearby Halifax Medical Center, Bodine was in stable condition and eventually returned to racing a month later. Fellow driver Jimmy Kitchens was also hospitalized, but he, however, did not suffer any major injuries.

After 55 minutes under the red flag (including slow caution periods before and after it waved), the race restarted. TV coverage moved to ESPN2 due to the length of the red flag period.

=== Finish ===
On the final lap, Andy Houston jumped to the lead on a last-lap restart but got loose in turn 3 and Mike Wallace slipped by to take the first truck victory at Daytona as Busch, after barely avoiding Bodine's truck in the lap 57 crash, finished second. In victory lane ceremonies Truck Series driver Todd Bodine announced that his brother Geoff had survived the crash and the announcers confirmed that the debris and flames from the collision had injured five fans, who also survived. The most serious injuries were to three fans burned by the fire that engulfed Bodine's truck when it hit the catchfence. The other two were hit by debris.

== Race results ==
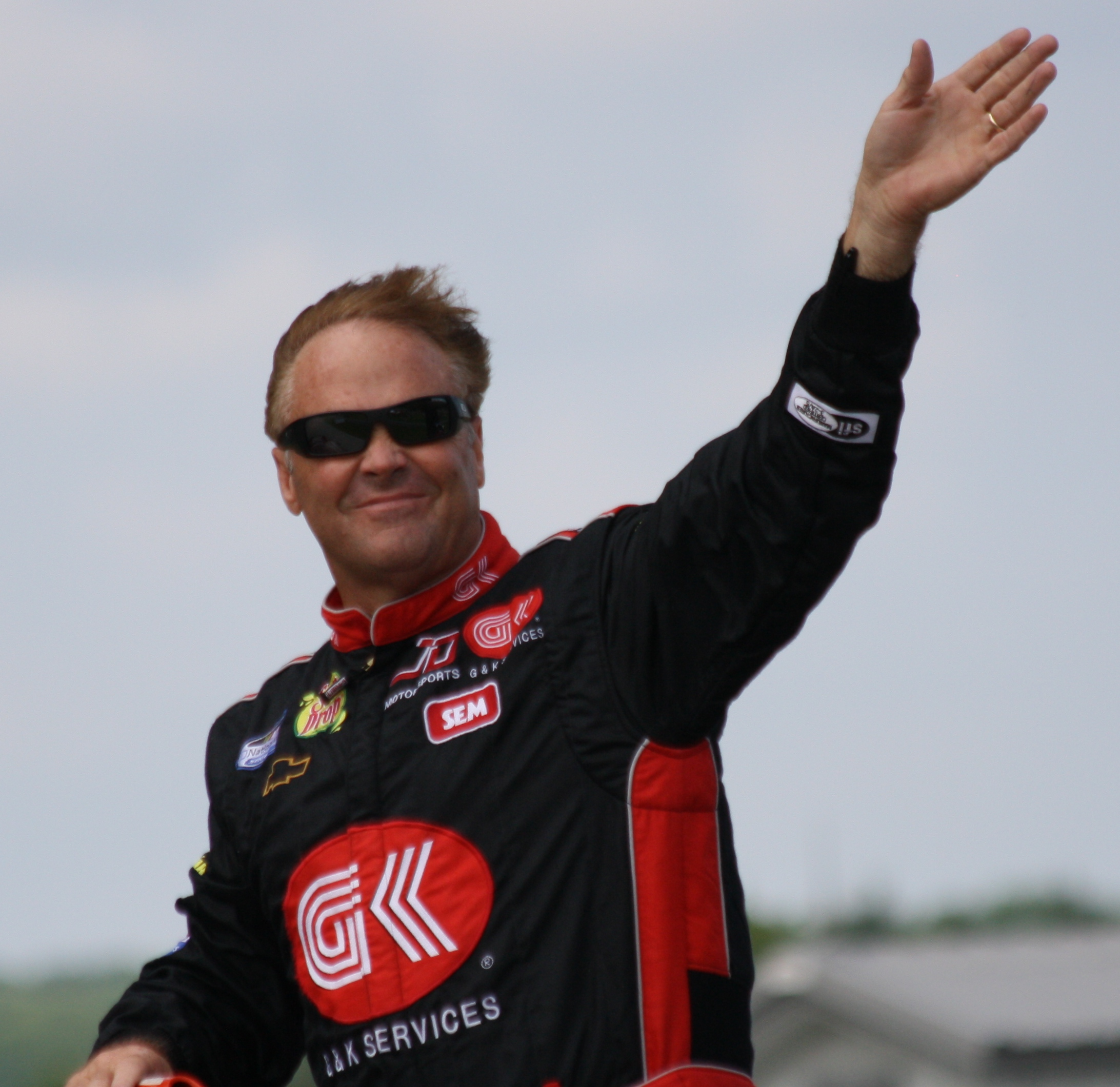
Mike Wallace (shown in 2013), the winner of the race

1. 2–Mike Wallace, Led 59 of 100 Laps
2. 99–Kurt Busch*
3. 60–Andy Houston, Led 9 Laps
4. 88–Terry Cook, Led 7 Laps
5. 98–Kenny Martin*
6. 72–Randy MacDonald
7. 66–Rick Carelli
8. 1–Dennis Setzer, 1 Lap down
9. 84–Donnie Neuenberger, 1 Lap down
10. 43–Steve Grissom, 5 Laps Down; Led 5 Laps
11. 50–Greg Biffle, 92 Laps (Accident); Led 1 Lap
12. 86–Mike Cope*, 10 Laps Down
13. 12–Carlos Contreras*, 16 Laps Down
14. 6–Rich Woodland, Jr., 82 Laps (Transmission)
15. 25–Randy Tolsma, 21 Laps Down
16. 00–Ryan McGlynn, 76 Laps (Engine Failure)
17. 97–Ron Barfield, Jr., 66 Laps (Engine Failure)
18. 75–Marty Houston, 65 Laps (Accident); Led 2 Laps
19. 18–Joe Ruttman, 64 Laps (Engine Failure); Led 1 Lap
20. 26–Jamie McMurray*, 60 Laps (Accident)
21. 31–John Young*, 57 Laps (Accident)
22. 52–Lyndon Amick, 56 Laps (Accident); Led 2 Laps
23. 46–Rob Morgan, 56 Laps (Accident); Led 4 Laps
24. 15–Geoff Bodine, 56 Laps (Accident)
25. 27–Lonnie Rush, Jr., 56 Laps (Accident)
26. 90–Lance Norick, 56 Laps (Accident)
27. 73–B. A. Wilson, 56 Laps (Accident)
28. 42–Jimmy Kitchens, 56 Laps (Accident); Led 3 Laps
29. 16–Jimmy Hensley, 55 Laps (Accident)
30. 4–Bobby Hamilton, 36 Laps (Accident); Led 6 Laps
31. 41–Randy Renfrow, 36 Laps (Accident)
32. 7–Morgan Shepherd, 17 Laps (Rocker arm); Led 1 Lap
33. 24–Jack Sprague, 14 Laps (Accident)
34. 14–Rick Crawford, 13 Laps (Accident)
35. 3–Bryan Reffner, 13 Laps (Accident)
36. 35–David Starr, 10 Laps (Engine Failure)

=== Failed to qualify ===
- 51–Rick Ware*
- 19–Ricky Sanders
- 11–Joe Buford
- 09–Matt Mullins
- 9–Lance Hooper*
- 5–Tom Powers
- 04–Brad Teague
- 28–Kenny Allen
- 01–Peter Gibbons
- 54–Brian Sockwell
- 69–Jeff Spraker
- 71–Tommy Croft
- 80–Gary Bradberry
- 91–Carl Long
- 93–Wayne Edwards*
- 23–Phil Bonifield

Preceded by 1999 NAPA Auto Parts 200	NASCAR Craftsman Truck Series; 2000	Succeeded by 2000 Florida Dodge Dealers 400K
