= 1999 NASCAR Craftsman Truck Series =

American motorsport season

The 1999 NASCAR Craftsman Truck Series season was the 5th season of the NASCAR Craftsman Truck Series, a stock car racing series sanctioned by NASCAR in the United States. Jack Sprague of Hendrick Motorsports was crowned champion for the second time.

== Teams and drivers ==
List of full-time teams at the start of 1999.

Manufacturer	Team	No.	Driver	Crew chief
Chevrolet	Addington Racing	60	Andy Houston	Rick Ren
Chevrolet	Chesrown Racing	6	Rick Carelli	Rodney Haygood
Chevrolet	Conely Racing	7	Tom Hubert	John Conely
Chevrolet	Dale Earnhardt, Inc.	16	Ron Hornaday Jr.	Sandy Jones
Chevrolet	Hendrick Motorsports	24	Jack Sprague	Dennis Connor
Chevrolet	Ken Schrader Racing	52	Scott Hansen (R)	Wally Brown
Chevrolet	McCray Racing	42	Rick McCray	Rickey McCray
Chevrolet	McGlynn Racing	00	Ryan McGlynn (R)	Raynard McGlynn
Chevrolet	Richard Childress Racing	3	Jay Sauter	Todd Berrier
Chevrolet	SealMaster Racing	88	Terry Cook	Chris Showalter
Chevrolet	Sonntag Racing	73	David Starr (R)	Joey Sonntag
Chevrolet	Spears Motorsports	75	Marty Houston (R)	Freddy Fryar
Ford	Brevak Racing	31	Kevin Cywinski	Joe Shear Jr.
Ford	Circle Bar Racing	14	Rick Crawford	George Church
Ford	CJ Racing	27	Ernie Cope (R)	Mike Albernaz
Ford	Gloy–Rahal Racing	55	Ron Barfield Jr.	Kevin Caldwell
Ford	Liberty Racing	98	Kevin Harvick	Roland Wlodyka
Ford	Morgan–Dollar Motorsports	46	Rob Morgan	Tim Murphy
Ford	Phelon Motorsports	66	Mike Stefanik (R)	Emory Donaldson
Ford	Roush Racing	50	Greg Biffle	Randy Goss
Ford	Roush Racing	99	Mike Bliss	Matt Chambers
Ford	Steele Racing	21	Tim Steele (R)	Tom Sokoloski
Ford	Ultra Motorsports	2	Mike Wallace	Tim Kohuth
Dodge	Bobby Hamilton Racing	18	Joe Ruttman	Eddie Jones
Dodge	Impact Motorsports	25	Randy Tolsma	Gary Showalter
Dodge	Impact Motorsports	86	Stacy Compton	Kevin Cram
Dodge	K Automotive Racing	1	Dennis Setzer	Howard Comstock
Dodge	L&R Racing	90	Lance Norick	Mike Cheek
Dodge	Petty Enterprises	43	Jimmy Hensley	Fred Wanke

== Schedule ==
No.	Race title	Track	Location	Date
1	Florida Dodge Dealers 400K	Homestead–Miami Speedway	Homestead, Florida	March 20
2	Chevy Trucks NASCAR 150	Phoenix International Raceway	Avondale, Arizona	March 27
3	NAPACARD 200	Evergreen Speedway	Monroe, Washington	April 3
4	Dodge California Truck Stop 300	Mesa Marin Raceway	Bakersfield, California	April 10
5	NAPA 250	Martinsville Speedway	Ridgeway, Virginia	April 17
6	Memphis 200	Memphis Motorsports Park	Millington, Tennessee	May 8
7	NAPA 300K	Pikes Peak International Raceway	Fountain, Colorado	May 16
8	O'Reilly Auto Parts 200	I-70 Speedway	Odessa, Missouri	May 22
9	Coca-Cola Family 200	Bristol Motor Speedway	Bristol, Tennessee	June 5
10	Pronto Auto Parts 400K	Texas Motor Speedway	Fort Worth, Texas	June 11
11	Grainger Industrial Supply 225K	Portland International Raceway	Portland, Oregon	June 18
12	Bully Hill Vineyards 150	Watkins Glen International	Watkins Glen, New York	June 26
13	DieHard 200	Milwaukee Mile	West Allis, Wisconsin	July 3
14	Federated Auto Parts 250	Nashville Speedway USA	Nashville, Tennessee	July 10
15	NAPA AutoCare 200	Nazareth Speedway	Nazareth, Pennsylvania	July 18
16	goracing.com 200	Michigan International Speedway	Cambridge Township, Michigan	July 24
17	Pennzoil/VIP Discount Auto Center 200	New Hampshire International Speedway	Loudon, New Hampshire	August 1
18	Power Stroke 200 by Ford	Indianapolis Raceway Park	Brownsburg, Indiana	August 5
19	Ram Tough 200	Gateway International Raceway	Madison, Illinois	August 20
20	O'Reilly Auto Parts 275	Heartland Park Topeka	Topeka, Kansas	August 28
21	Virginia Is For Lovers 200	Richmond International Raceway	Richmond, Virginia	September 9
22	Orleans 250	Las Vegas Motor Speedway	Las Vegas, Nevada	September 24
23	Kroger 225	Louisville Motor Speedway	Louisville, Kentucky	October 8
24	O'Reilly 300	Texas Motor Speedway	Fort Worth, Texas	October 15
25	NAPA Auto Parts 200	California Speedway	Fontana, California	October 30

== Races ==
No.	Race	Pole position	Most laps led	Winning driver	Manufacturer
1	Florida Dodge Dealers 400K	Randy Tolsma	Randy Tolsma	Mike Wallace	Ford
2	Chevy Trucks NASCAR 150	Jack Sprague	Ron Hornaday Jr.	Ron Hornaday Jr.	Chevrolet
3	NAPACARD 200	Ron Hornaday Jr.*	Ron Hornaday Jr.	Ron Hornaday Jr.	Chevrolet
4	Dodge California Truck Stop 300	Stacy Compton	Ron Hornaday Jr.	Rick Carelli	Chevrolet
5	NAPA 250	Mike Bliss	Mike Wallace	Jimmy Hensley	Dodge
6	Memphis 200	Greg Biffle	Kevin Harvick	Greg Biffle	Ford
7	NAPA 300K	Mike Bliss	Jack Sprague	Mike Wallace	Ford
8	O'Reilly Auto Parts 200	Stacy Compton	Jimmy Hensley	Jack Sprague	Chevrolet
9	Coca-Cola Family 200	Greg Biffle	Jack Sprague	Jack Sprague	Chevrolet
10	Pronto Auto Parts 400K	Jay Sauter	Ron Hornaday Jr.	Dennis Setzer	Dodge
11	Grainger Industrial Supply 225K	Boris Said	Ron Fellows	Greg Biffle	Ford
12	Bully Hill Vineyards 150	Ron Fellows	Ron Fellows	Ron Fellows	Chevrolet
13	DieHard 200	Greg Biffle	Greg Biffle	Greg Biffle	Ford
14	Federated Auto Parts 250	Tim Steele	Jack Sprague	Dennis Setzer	Dodge
15	NAPA AutoCare 200	Greg Biffle	Ron Hornaday Jr.	Greg Biffle	Ford
16	goracing.com 200	Stacy Compton	Greg Biffle	Greg Biffle	Ford
17	Pennzoil/VIP Discount Auto Center 200	Stacy Compton	Stacy Compton	Dennis Setzer	Dodge
18	Power Stroke 200 by Ford	Dennis Setzer	Dennis Setzer	Greg Biffle	Ford
19	Ram Tough 200	Stacy Compton	Jack Sprague	Greg Biffle	Ford
20	O'Reilly Auto Parts 275	Boris Said	Boris Said	Mike Bliss	Ford
21	Virginia Is For Lovers 200	Bobby Hamilton	Bobby Hamilton	Greg Biffle	Ford
22	Orleans 250	Stacy Compton	Ron Hornaday Jr.	Greg Biffle	Ford
23	Kroger 225	Jimmy Hensley	Jimmy Hensley	Jay Sauter	Chevrolet
24	O'Reilly 300	Jay Sauter	Ron Hornaday Jr.	Jay Sauter	Chevrolet
25	NAPA Auto Parts 200	Andy Houston	Ron Hornaday Jr.	Jack Sprague	Chevrolet
* - No qualifying due to rain; line-up set by owner points

=== Florida Dodge Dealers 400K ===
The Florida Dodge Dealers 400K was held March 20 at Homestead-Miami Speedway. Randy Tolsma won the pole.

Top Ten Results

1. #2 - Mike Wallace
2. #66 - Mike Stefanik
3. #86 - Stacy Compton
4. #16 - Ron Hornaday Jr.
5. #60 - Andy Houston
6. #31 - Kevin Cywinski
7. #52 - Scott Hansen
8. #14 - Rick Crawford
9. #18 - Butch Miller
10. #6 - Rick Carelli
- This would be last Truck Series season opener to be held at a track other than Daytona International Speedway, as the series would begin racing at Daytona starting in 2000.

Failed to qualify: none

=== Chevy Trucks NASCAR 150 ===
The Chevy Trucks NASCAR 150 was held March 27 at Phoenix International Raceway. Jack Sprague won the pole.

Top Ten Results

1. #16 - Ron Hornaday Jr.
2. #24 - Jack Sprague
3. #60 - Andy Houston
4. #86 - Stacy Compton
5. #1 - Dennis Setzer
6. #14 - Rick Crawford
7. #43 - Jimmy Hensley
8. #3 - Jay Sauter
9. #31 - Kevin Cywinski
10. #99 - Mike Bliss

Failed to qualify: none

=== NAPACARD 200 ===
The NAPACARD 200 was held April 3 at Evergreen Speedway. Ron Hornaday Jr. won the pole.

Top Ten Results

1. #16 - Ron Hornaday Jr.
2. #24 - Jack Sprague
3. #55 - Ron Barfield Jr.
4. #86 - Stacy Compton
5. #2 - Mike Wallace
6. #6 - Rick Carelli
7. #1 - Dennis Setzer
8. #99 - Mike Bliss
9. #98 - Kevin Harvick
10. #50 - Greg Biffle

Failed to qualify: none

=== Dodge California Truck Stop 300 ===
The Dodge California Truck Stop 300 was held April 10 at Mesa Marin Raceway. Stacy Compton won the pole.

Top Ten Results

1. #6 - Rick Carelli
2. #98 - Kevin Harvick
3. #86 - Stacy Compton
4. #16 - Ron Hornaday Jr.
5. #43 - Jimmy Hensley
6. #1 - Dennis Setzer
7. #24 - Jack Sprague
8. #2 - Mike Wallace
9. #18 - Butch Miller
10. #31 - Kevin Cywinski

Failed to qualify: Larry Carnes (#36)

=== NAPA 250 ===
The NAPA 250 was held April 17 at Martinsville Speedway. Mike Bliss won the pole.

Top Ten Results

1. #43 - Jimmy Hensley
2. #86 - Stacy Compton
3. #24 - Jack Sprague
4. #31 - Kevin Cywinski
5. #50 - Greg Biffle
6. #99 - Mike Bliss
7. #25 - Randy Tolsma
8. #44 - Ernie Irvan
9. #6 - Rick Carelli
10. #98 - Kevin Harvick

Failed to qualify: Ronnie Newman (#82), Carl Long (#91), Brian Sockwell (#54), Ronnie Hornaday (#97), Billy Venturini (#35), Ronnie Hoover (#28), Ryan McGlynn (#00), Shane Jenkins (#81)

=== Memphis 200 ===
The Memphis 200 was held May 8 at Memphis Motorsports Park. Greg Biffle won the pole. This race became infamous for an incident involving Rick Carelli, who suffered a basilar-skull fracture, among other injuries, after slamming the wall in turns 3-4 due to a flat tire. Carelli miraculously survived, but would be out for the rest of the season.

Top Ten Results

1. #50 - Greg Biffle
2. #98 - Kevin Harvick
3. #3 - Jay Sauter
4. #86 - Stacy Compton
5. #1 - Dennis Setzer
6. #16 - Ron Hornaday Jr.
7. #60 - Andy Houston
8. #25 - Randy Tolsma
9. #24 - Jack Sprague
10. #18 - Butch Miller

Failed to qualify: Billy Venturini (#35), Michael Dokken (#64), Shane Jenkins (#81)

=== NAPA 300K ===
The NAPA 300K was held May 16 at Pikes Peak International Raceway. Mike Bliss won the pole.

Top Ten Results

1. #2 - Mike Wallace
2. #24 - Jack Sprague
3. #98 - Kevin Harvick
4. #60 - Andy Houston
5. #43 - Jimmy Hensley
6. #16 - Ron Hornaday Jr.
7. #55 - Ron Barfield Jr.
8. #14 - Rick Crawford
9. #3 - Jay Sauter
10. #18 - Butch Miller

Failed to qualify: none

=== O'Reilly Auto Parts 200 ===
The O'Reilly Auto Parts 200 was held May 22 at I-70 Speedway. Stacy Compton won the pole.

Top Ten Results

1. #24 - Jack Sprague
2. #1 - Dennis Setzer
3. #60 - Andy Houston
4. #86 - Stacy Compton
5. #43 - Jimmy Hensley
6. #31 - Kevin Cywinski
7. #66 - Mike Stefanik
8. #25 - Randy Tolsma
9. #99 - Mike Bliss
10. #50 - Greg Biffle
- Jamie McMurray made his NASCAR top-touring series debut in this race, driving the #26 Ford for Mittler Brothers Racing.

Failed to qualify: none

=== Coca-Cola Family 200 ===
The Coca-Cola Family 200 was held June 5 at Bristol Motor Speedway. Greg Biffle won the pole.

Top Ten Results

1. #24 - Jack Sprague
2. #86 - Stacy Compton
3. #31 - Kevin Cywinski
4. #60 - Andy Houston
5. #1 - Dennis Setzer
6. #98 - Kevin Harvick
7. #3 - Jay Sauter
8. #27 - Lonnie Rush Jr.
9. #50 - Greg Biffle
10. #52 - Scott Hansen

Failed to qualify: none

=== Pronto Auto Parts 400K ===
The Pronto Auto Parts 400K was held June 11 at Texas Motor Speedway. Jay Sauter won the pole.

Top Ten Results

1. #1 - Dennis Setzer
2. #3 - Jay Sauter
3. #50 - Greg Biffle
4. #2 - Mike Wallace
5. #24 - Jack Sprague
6. #99 - Mike Bliss
7. #60 - Andy Houston
8. #43 - Jimmy Hensley
9. #86 - Stacy Compton
10. #16 - Ron Hornaday Jr.

Failed to qualify: Randy Renfrow (#6)

=== Grainger 225 ===
The inaugural Grainger Industrial Supply 225K was held June 18 at Portland International Raceway. Boris Said won the pole.

Top Ten Results

1. #50 - Greg Biffle
2. #99 - Mike Bliss
3. #87 - Ron Fellows
4. #88 - Terry Cook
5. #44 - Boris Said
6. #25 - Randy Tolsma
7. #60 - Andy Houston
8. #3 - Jay Sauter
9. #1 - Dennis Setzer
10. #18 - Joe Ruttman

Failed to qualify: none

=== Bully Hill Vineyards 150 ===
The Bully Hill Vineyards 150 was held June 26 at Watkins Glen International. Ron Fellows won the pole.

Top Ten Results

1. #87 - Ron Fellows
2. #2 - Mike Wallace
3. #24 - Jack Sprague
4. #50 - Greg Biffle
5. #16 - Ron Hornaday Jr.
6. #3 - Jay Sauter
7. #98 - Kevin Harvick
8. #60 - Andy Houston
9. #90 - Lance Norick
10. #14 - Rick Crawford

Failed to qualify: none

=== DieHard 200 ===
The DieHard 200 was held July 3 at The Milwaukee Mile. Greg Biffle won the pole.

Top Ten Results

1. #50 - Greg Biffle
2. #24 - Jack Sprague
3. #14 - Rick Crawford
4. #2 - Mike Wallace
5. #99 - Mike Bliss
6. #1 - Dennis Setzer
7. #16 - Ron Hornaday Jr.
8. #25 - Randy Tolsma
9. #3 - Jay Sauter
10. #86 - Stacy Compton

Failed to qualify: none

=== Federated Auto Parts 250 ===
The Federated Auto Parts 250 was held July 10 at Nashville Speedway USA. Tim Steele won the pole.

Top Ten Results

1. #1 - Dennis Setzer
2. #98 - Kevin Harvick
3. #43 - Jimmy Hensley
4. #18 - Joe Ruttman
5. #24 - Jack Sprague
6. #60 - Andy Houston
7. #55 - Ron Barfield Jr.
8. #66 - Mike Stefanik
9. #21 - Tim Steele
10. #31 - Kevin Cywinski

Failed to qualify: B. A. Wilson (#85), Ronnie Newman (#82), Scotty Sands (#47), Steve Stevenson (#11)

=== NAPA AutoCare 200 ===
The NAPA AutoCare 200 was held July 18 at Nazareth Speedway. Greg Biffle won the pole.

Top Ten Results

1. #50 - Greg Biffle
2. #99 - Mike Bliss
3. #52 - Scott Hansen
4. #3 - Jay Sauter
5. #25 - Randy Tolsma
6. #75 - Marty Houston
7. #1 - Dennis Setzer
8. #66 - Mike Stefanik
9. #43 - Jimmy Hensley
10. #86 - Stacy Compton

Failed to qualify: none

=== goracing.com 200 ===
The inaugural goracing.com 200 was held July 24 at Michigan International Speedway. Stacy Compton won the pole.

Top Ten Results

1. #50 - Greg Biffle
2. #3 - Jay Sauter
3. #43 - Jimmy Hensley
4. #24 - Jack Sprague
5. #18 - Joe Ruttman
6. #86 - Stacy Compton
7. #66 - Mike Stefanik
8. #1 - Dennis Setzer
9. #16 - Ron Hornaday Jr.
10. #8 - Jim Sauter

Failed to qualify: none

=== Pennzoil/VIP Discount Auto Center 200 ===
The Pennzoil/VIP Discount Auto Center 200 was held August 1 at New Hampshire International Speedway.

Top Ten Results

1. #1 - Dennis Setzer
2. #2 - Mike Wallace
3. #86 - Stacy Compton
4. #50 - Greg Biffle
5. #14 - Rick Crawford
6. #99 - Mike Bliss
7. #60 - Andy Houston
8. #24 - Jack Sprague
9. #43 - Jimmy Hensley
10. #25 - Randy Tolsma

Failed to qualify: none

=== Power Stroke 200 by Ford ===
The Power Stroke 200 by Ford was held August 5 at Indianapolis Raceway Park. Dennis Setzer won the pole.

Top Ten Results

1. #50 - Greg Biffle
2. #86 - Stacy Compton
3. #2 - Mike Wallace
4. #98 - Kevin Harvick
5. #99 - Mike Bliss
6. #3 - Jay Sauter
7. #1 - Dennis Setzer
8. #60 - Andy Houston
9. #25 - Randy Tolsma
10. #18 - Joe Ruttman

Failed to qualify: Andy Hillenburg (#48), Kevin Sasser (#65), Mike Clark (#38), Tom Bambard (#17), Brad Means (#92)

=== Ram Tough 200 ===
The Ram Tough 200 was held August 20 at Gateway International Raceway. Stacy Compton won the pole.

Top Ten Results

1. #50 - Greg Biffle
2. #1 - Dennis Setzer
3. #24 - Jack Sprague
4. #86 - Stacy Compton
5. #2 - Mike Wallace
6. #66 - Mike Stefanik
7. #18 - Joe Ruttman
8. #99 - Mike Bliss
9. #14 - Rick Crawford
10. #43 - Jimmy Hensley

Failed to qualify: Ross Thompson (#94), Chris Horn (#58), Steve Stevenson (#11)

=== O'Reilly Auto Parts 275 ===
The O'Reilly Auto Parts 275 was held August 28 at Heartland Park Topeka. Boris Said won the pole.

Top Ten Results

1. #99 - Mike Bliss
2. #44 - Boris Said
3. #3 - Jay Sauter
4. #14 - Rick Crawford
5. #46 - Rob Morgan
6. #16 - Ron Hornaday Jr.
7. #18 - Joe Ruttman
8. #50 - Greg Biffle
9. #2 - Mike Wallace
10. #66 - Mike Stefanik

Failed to qualify: Randy Briggs (#53), Bow Carpenter (#37)

=== Virginia Is For Lovers 200 ===
The Virginia Is For Lovers 200 was held September 9 at Richmond International Raceway. Bobby Hamilton won the pole.

Top Ten Results

1. #50 - Greg Biffle
2. #16 - Ron Hornaday Jr.
3. #1 - Dennis Setzer
4. #2 - Mike Wallace
5. #24 - Jack Sprague
6. #60 - Andy Houston
7. #45 - Rich Bickle
8. #25 - Randy Tolsma
9. #41 - Randy Renfrow
10. #34 - Adam Petty

Failed to qualify: Brian Sockwell (#54), Boris Said (#44), B. A. Wilson (#85), Jerry Kobza (#11)

=== Orleans 250 ===
The Orleans 250 was held September 24 at Las Vegas Motor Speedway. Stacy Compton won the pole. Greg Biffle would win his 9th and final race of the season. However, post-race inspection by NASCAR found that Biffle's truck had an illegal intake manifold. Biffle would keep the race win, but was penalized 120 points by NASCAR. The penalty dropped Biffle's points lead over Sprague from 130 to only 10.

Top Ten Results

1. #50 - Greg Biffle
2. #24 - Jack Sprague
3. #16 - Ron Hornaday Jr.
4. #1 - Dennis Setzer
5. #3 - Jay Sauter
6. #86 - Stacy Compton
7. #43 - Jimmy Hensley
8. #14 - Rick Crawford
9. #98 - Kevin Harvick
10. #88 - Terry Cook

Failed to qualify: Auggie Vidovich (#5), Tommy Croft (#71), Bobby Register (#36), Milan Garrett (#35), Dwayne Leik (#81), Rick Ware (#51), Bill Sedgwick (#44)

=== Kroger 225 ===
The Kroger 225 was held October 8 at Louisville Motor Speedway. Jimmy Hensley won the pole. Sprague took the points lead from Biffle, leading by 24 points.

Top Ten Results

1. #3 - Jay Sauter
2. #2 - Mike Wallace
3. #43 - Jimmy Hensley
4. #98 - Kevin Harvick
5. #24 - Jack Sprague
6. #16 - Ron Hornaday Jr.
7. #14 - Rick Crawford
8. #1 - Dennis Setzer
9. #66 - Mike Stefanik
10. #18 - Joe Ruttman

Failed to qualify Frank Kimmel (#69), Ryan McGlynn (#00), Wayne Edwards (#77), Martin Truex (#68), Tom Powers (#5), Randy Briggs (#53), Phil Bonifield (#23), Scotty Sands (#47), Jerry Kobza (#11), Rick McCray (#42)

=== O'Reilly 300 ===
The O'Reilly 300 was held October 15 at Texas Motor Speedway. Jay Sauter won the pole. Biffle regained the points lead from Sprague, leading by 21 points. Setzer was now involved for the championship, only 25 points behind.

Top Ten Results

1. #3 - Jay Sauter
2. #50 - Greg Biffle
3. #1 - Dennis Setzer
4. #2 - Mike Wallace
5. #25 - Randy Tolsma
6. #88 - Terry Cook
7. #18 - Joe Ruttman
8. #60 - Andy Houston
9. #29 - Bob Keselowski
10. #16 - Ron Hornaday Jr.

Failed to qualify: Jay Stewart (#33), Tommy Croft (#71), Rick Ware (#51), Rick McCray (#23), Ross Thompson (#92)

=== NAPA Auto Parts 200 ===
The NAPA Auto Parts 200 was held October 30 at California Speedway. Andy Houston won the pole. Biffle entered the race with 21-point and 25-point leads over Sprague and Setzer respectively. Setzer would wreck out early in the race, leaving Biffle and Sprague to battle for the championship. Before the last restart on lap 99, Biffle was 7th while Sprague was 3rd. However, on the restart, Sprague was able to pass Hornaday Jr. and Bliss while Biffle lost two positions due to being held up by a lapped truck. Biffle was able to regain the lost positions and finish 7th, but Sprague would go on to win the race and his second championship.

Top Ten Results

1. #24 - Jack Sprague
2. #18 - Joe Ruttman
3. #86 - Stacy Compton
4. #04 - Bobby Hamilton
5. #99 - Mike Bliss
6. #16 - Ron Hornaday Jr.
7. #50 - Greg Biffle
8. #43 - Jimmy Hensley
9. #66 - Mike Stefanik
10. #3 - Jay Sauter

Failed to qualify: Ross Thompson (#92), Tom Powers (#5), Milan Garrett (#85), Mark Gibson (#59)

== Final points standings ==
(key) Bold – Pole position awarded by time. Italics – Pole position earned by points standings. * – Most laps led.

Pos.	Driver	Races																									Points
Pos.	Driver	HOM	PHO	EVG	MMR	MAR	MEM	PPR	I70	BRI	TEX	PIR	WGL	MLW	NSV	NAZ	MCH	NHA	IRP	GTY	HPT	RCH	LVS	LVL	TEX	CAL	Points
1	Jack Sprague	22	**2**	2	7	3	9	2*	1	1*	5	28	3	2	5*	13	4	8	34	3*	26	5	2	5	11	1	3747
2	Greg Biffle	11	11	10	24	5	**1**	14	10	**9**	3	1	4	**1***	22	**1**	1*	4	1	1	8	1	1	14	2	7	3739
3	Dennis Setzer	34	5	7	6	15	5	16	2	5	1	9	22	6	1	7	8	1	7*	2	12	3	4	8	3	29	3639
4	Stacy Compton	3	4	4	**3**	2	4	28	**4**	2	9	17	15	10	27	10	**6**	**3***	2	**4**	21	11	**6**	13	12	3	3623
5	Jay Sauter	21	8	19	11	11	3	9	14	7	**2**	8	6	9	12	4	2	11	6	18	3	36	5	1	**1**	10	3543
6	Mike Wallace	1	14	5	8	26*	28	1	17	14	4	11	2	4	18	12	12	2	3	5	9	4	28	2	4	23	3494
7	Ron Hornaday Jr.	4	1*	1*	4*	16	6	6	11	18	10*	27	5	7	23	24*	9	18	29	21	6	2	3*	6	10*	6*	3488
8	Andy Houston	5	3	14	19	17	7	4	3	4	7	7	8	20	6	11	19	7	8	25	11	6	22	12	8	**18**	3359
9	Mike Bliss	28	10	8	12	**6**	12	**15**	9	28	6	2	19	5	15	2	22	6	5	8	1	13	30	11	26	5	3294
10	Jimmy Hensley	29	7	21	5	1	30	5	5*	12	8	23	23	12	3	9	3	9	30	10	14	15	7	**3***	14	8	3280
11	Randy Tolsma	**17***	15	11	13	7	8	26	8	16	17	6	13	8	21	5	15	10	9	16	13	8	16	25	5	12	3173
12	Kevin Harvick	27	23	9	2	10	2*	3	16	6	24	20	7	17	2	25	11	15	4	27	31	22	9	4	20	15	3139
13	Mike Stefanik **(R)**	2	13	24	14	12	11	11	7	22	28	13	11	13	8	8	7	13	16	6	10	16	32	9	31	9	3074
14	Rick Crawford	8	6	12	22	33	22	8	27	21	12	16	10	3	14	17	29	5	12	9	4	12	8	7	23	35	3018
15	Terry Cook	19	19	26	15	25	13	17	12	15	22	4	12	16	20	14	13	12	17	15	19	24	10	23	6	31	2838
16	Kevin Cywinski	6	9	15	10	4	26	12	6	3	21	24	24	18	10	23	31	19	15	11	27	25	21	24	27	33	2777
17	Ron Barfield Jr.	15	21	3	29	24	31	7	19	11	18	18	14	11	7	26	17	14	13	13	28	18	29	17	33	21	2743
18	Scott Hansen **(R)**	7	16	13	18	14	15	30	13	10	13	15	17	31	11	3	16	27	11	24	24	14	26	16	19		2719
19	Rob Morgan	26	33	25	28	21	16	25	22	26	19	26	16	22	16	18	18	24	22	26	5	28	25	22	18	16	2458
20	Lance Norick	14	20	18	16	35	19	19	18	17	16	14	9	29	29	15				14	23	34	17	15	15	19	2313
21	Joe Ruttman	33	34			14					11	10	25	15	4	22	5	25	10	7	7	29	23	10	7	2	2275
22	David Starr **(R)**		18	20	26	19	32	20	21	19	14	31	29	24	26	21	24	20	21	28	32	32	33	21	32	32	2132
23	Marty Houston **(R)**							29	26	23	26	12	21	23	13	6	21	21	20	32	20	20	13	20	17	20	1958
24	Lonnie Rush Jr.	24	12	17	20	28	33	31	28	8	30	32	26	34	30							26				27	1408
25	Tim Steele **(R)**	25	22			23	17	13	30					14	**9**		14		14	19		21		26			1385
26	Bryan Reffner				23	34	14	18	23	24	23			21	31	20	20	16	18								1274
27	Rick McCray	16	30	23	17	30	23	36										17	28	20	25	33	19	DNQ	DNQ		1254
28	Butch Miller	9	26	16	9	27	10	10	20	13																11	1188
29	Ryan McGlynn **(R)**		32	28	27	DNQ	29	34	25	31	35		27		24	27	32	26						DNQ			1089
30	Randy Renfrow							22	15	27	DNQ						26			12		9	20		13	17	1055
31	Phil Bonifield **(R)**			30				35	32	32	32			33	34	33	30	32	32	31	34	QL	34	DNQ			972
32	B. A. Wilson				33	29	18				27				DNQ				33			DNQ	12		24	28	796
33	Rick Carelli	10	27	6	1	9	36																				739
34	Boris Said											**5**			25						**2***	17			34	13	725
35	Ron Fellows											3*	**1***								15				21		578
36	Bobby Hamilton					22	21											22				**31**				4	539
37	Ronnie Hornaday					DNQ	24								17	16			23					28			534
38	Bob Keselowski	23									15						28								9	30	507
39	Ross Thompson											19								DNQ	18		18		DNQ	DNQ	480
40	Randy MacDonald	13				18				25								30							29		470
41	Brad Bennett					31							20			19		28				19					464
42	Jamie McMurray								24										24	30			11		28		464
43	Stan Boyd						20								28		25		26	22							452
44	Michael Dokken	31				32	DNQ								32				31				27				405
45	Brian Sockwell	12				DNQ	34													23		DNQ					380
46	Tom Hubert	18	17	27					31																		373
47	Jerry Glanville		24					27						26				23									352
48	Ronnie Newman					DNQ	27			29					DNQ	32											332
49	Ernie Cope	32	29	22	25																						328
50	Shane Jenkins					DNQ	DNQ				36				19					29							314
51	Chris Horn							32			37									DNQ			36		30		308
52	John Young							23				29									33		31				304
53	Jeff Spraker												28			30		31						29			298
54	Mike Swaim Jr.					20	25	24																			282
55	Milan Garrett		35		34							30											DNQ			DNQ	281
56	Austin Cameron																23						15			34	273
57	Tommy Croft										29												DNQ		DNQ	25	262
58	Adam Petty																					10			16		249
59	Jerry Robertson										25			25	33												240
60	Tom Bambard																		DNQ					27		22	228
61	Carl Long					DNQ				20														30			225
62	Auggie Vidovich				30							22											DNQ				222
63	Bill Sedgwick		28		21																		DNQ				213
64	Jeff Andretti										31			30		31											213
65	Terry Fisher							21			20																203
66	Rich Bickle					36																7					201
67	Scott Riggs																		19			23					200
68	Mike Clark			29														33	DNQ								192
69	Randy Briggs								29												DNQ			DNQ			189
70	Scotty Sands														DNQ				27					DNQ			183
71	Rick Ware																						DNQ		DNQ	24	174
72	Brad Mueller													27					25								170
73	Doug George																			17		35					170
74	Brendan Gaughan				32																		24				158
75	Eric Norris										34														22		158
76	Jerry Kobza						35															DNQ		DNQ			147
77	Larry Carnes		25		DNQ																						146
78	Ernie Irvan					8																					142
79	Mike Dillon												30	32													140
80	Nelson Richardson		31		31																						140
81	Jim Sauter																10										139
82	Bow Carpenter													28							DNQ						134
83	Mike Cope																						14				121
84	Carlos Contreras																									14	121
85	Tommy Archer																				16						120
86	Ronnie Hoover					DNQ										28											116
87	Olivier Beretta																				17						112
88	Ted Christopher												18														109
89	Tony Roper																							18			109
90	Tom Powers																							DNQ		DNQ	107
91	Steve Stevenson														DNQ					DNQ							107
92	Robbie Thompson																							19			106
93	Tony Raines													19													106
94	Bobby Regester																						DNQ		36		104
95	Scot Walters	20																									103
96	Rob Rizzo											21															100
97	Mike Borkowski																				22						97
98	Billy Venturini					DNQ	DNQ																				92
99	Matt Mullins																								25		88
100	Dane Pitarresi											25															88
101	Rich Woodland Jr.																									26	85
102	Phil Massuch																27										82
103	Bruce Driver																					27					82
104	Jerry Miller															29											76
105	Darren Law																				29						76
106	Nipper Alsup																	29									76
107	Randy Nelson	30																									73
108	Danny Bagwell									30																	73
109	Joe Gaita																					30					73
110	Michael Cohen																				30						73
111	Frank Kimmel																							DNQ			70
112	Lonnie Cox							33																			64
113	Joey Sonntag										33																64
114	Wayne Edwards																							DNQ			64
115	Martin Truex Sr.																							DNQ			61
116	Andy Hillenburg																		DNQ								58
117	Tommy Houston																						35				58
118	Jay Stewart																								36		55
119	Kevin Sasser																		DNQ								55
120	Ken Schrader																									36	55
121	Brad Means																		DNQ								46
122	Mark Gibson																									DNQ	43
123	Dwayne Leik																						DNQ				40
Pos.	Driver	Races																									Points
Pos.	Driver	HOM	PHO	EVG	MMR	MAR	MEM	PPR	I70	BRI	TEX	PIR	WGL	MLW	NSV	NAZ	MCH	NHA	IRP	GTY	HPT	RCH	LVS	LVL	TEX	CAL	Points

== Rookie of the Year ==
Mike Stefanik, driving in the series full-time in the #66 Phelon Motorsports car after having won the series championship in both the Busch North Series and the Featherlite Modified Series in the previous two seasons, managed to get nine top-tens en route to winning Rookie of the Year honors. Runner-up Scott Hansen had three top-tens in a Ken Schrader-owned truck, while David Starr drove 24 races for various owners. Marty Houston, Phil Bonifield, Ryan McGlynn, and former ARCA champion Tim Steele ran limited schedules during the season. Nipper Alsup, Ernie Cope, Mike Clark, and Randy Nelson all failed to meet the minimum requirements to contend for the top Rookie honors.

== See also ==
- 1999 NASCAR Winston Cup Series
- 1999 NASCAR Busch Series
- 1999 NASCAR Winston West Series
- 1999 NASCAR Goody's Dash Series
- 1999 ARCA Bondo/Mar-Hyde Series
