= Angela Harkness =

American fraudster

- Born: Fatemeh Karimkhani; 1976 (age 48–49); Tehran, Iran
- Other names: Fatemeh Harkness, Fatemeh Angela Harkness
- Known for: Angela's Motorsports

Angela Harkness (also known as Fatemeh Karimkhani, born in 1976, in Tehran, Iran) is a convicted scam artist. Her biggest scheme was Angela's Motorsports, a NASCAR team in 2003. Harkness was sentenced to 40 months in prison on May 25, 2007.

== Early life ==
Fatemeh Karimkhani was born in 1976 in Tehran, Iran. She was the youngest of a large family. Her father was an Iranian civil servant and military officer who fled to Germany in about 1979 during the Iranian Revolution.

In about 1995, she moved to the United States and soon after found a job as a stripper in California.

She married Rayford Tyler Jr. in a scam intended to gain her citizenship; this would be the first of at least three unsuccessful attempts to become a U.S. citizen. In May 1996, the 21-year-old Karimkhani met a 40-year-old judge named Dion Harkness. Despite their constant bickering, they moved in together and later married, even though Karimkhani never divorced from her first husband. On three occasions, Karimkhani accused Harkness of domestic violence, and sought to have him arrested. Despite his proclamation of innocence, Harkness, who had no prior criminal record, lost his seat on the bench and the ability to practice law. Harkness accused Karimkhani of self-abuse, abusive behavior toward him and addictions to drugs and pornography, but to no avail. Karimkhani gave birth to a baby in November 2000. Four months later, Harkness left his wife after another fight, and a few days afterward was found dead in a Palm Desert, California hotel room of an apparent suicide.

== Angela's Motorsports ==
Angela's Motorsports
- Owner(s): Angela Harkness
- Race drivers: Jay Sauter
- Manufacturer: Ford
- Opened: 2002
- Closed: 2003

Career
- Races competed: 1

Karimkhani, now calling herself Angela Harkness without benefit of a legal name change, claimed to have served a variety of occupations among them included: a kindergarten teacher, trophy girl, motocross champion, and a wealthy heiress, among others.

In the fall of 2001, at an Austin, Texas strip club where she worked as a stripper, she met Gary D. Jones, a vice-president of a Wells Fargo bank branch. The two became lovers, and Jones, who was married, later moved in with her. Authorities say the couple wrote fraudulent checks and obtained bank loans with bogus applications in their relatives' names.

Harkness suggested that they form a new minority-owned NASCAR team, which would attract multimillion-dollar sponsorships. Purchasing cars from Robert Yates Racing, the two assembled a championship-caliber team in crew chief Harold Holly, general manager Clyde McLeod, and popular driver Mike McLaughlin. The team made its debut at the season-closing Ford 300 in the NASCAR Busch Series in 2002 with Kevin Lepage and Jay Sauter driving. When they tested in 2003 with McLaughlin, they were the fastest team.

However, Jones and Harkness could not produce the $6,000,000 they needed to remain in business, and their checks began to bounce. Harkness threatened their sponsor, WiredFlyer.com, (a now-defunct Austin-based internet travel agency) to pay $350,000 or face legal action. RYR owner Robert Yates caught on and was able to get his equipment back; but not all investors were able to recoup their losses. Shortly thereafter, Jones and Harkness fled and the team dissolved after the season-opening race.

=== Fallout ===
With all the quality driver positions filled, Mike McLaughlin's racing career came to a halt. He became a development driver coach for Joe Gibbs Racing, and opened his own racing fabrication business. McLeod, Holly and other teams members continued in racing with other NASCAR teams.

== Final days on the run ==
Jones was found operating a sports grill and was arrested for theft, fraud and embezzlement from Wells Fargo Bank. Harkness entered a plea agreement for fraud and agreed to testify against Jones, but fled the country prior to sentencing. After a long manhunt, she was finally arrested in 2005 in Dubai, her Iranian passport was confiscated, and she was ordered not to leave that country, pending her return to the U.S. She was arrested in April 2007 by United States Marshals upon arrival from the United Arab Emirates in New York City, and was tried in Central Texas. Harkness was sentenced to three and a half years in federal prison.
