= Impact Motorsports =

Former NASCAR team

- Owner(s): David Hodson; Russell Kersh
- Base: Charlotte, North Carolina
- Series: NASCAR Craftsman Truck Series
- Race drivers: Stacy Compton, Mike Cope, Carlos Contreras, Randy Tolsma, Scott Riggs, Derrike Cope
- Manufacturer: Ford; Dodge
- Opened: 1997
- Closed: 2001

Career
- Drivers' Championships: 0
- Race victories: 3

Impact Motorsports is a former NASCAR Craftsman Truck Series team. It was owned by David Hodson and Russell Kersh from 1997 until 2001, when it was sold to Phil Bonifield.

Impact debuted in 1997 at the Chevy Trucks Challenge at Walt Disney World Speedway. Stacy Compton drove the No. 86 Valvoline Ford F-Series to a tenth-place finish. Compton and Impact ran the entire season, and finished third behind Kenny Irwin Jr. and Rick Crawford for Rookie of the Year. The next season, RC Cola jumped on board to sponsor, and Compton won twice that season, at Portland and Kansas. He also was named Most Popular Driver as the team finished seventh in points. At that time, rumors began spreading that the team might run a Winston Cup race at Martinsville Speedway that year with Compton driving, but those plans never materialized. In 1999, Impact switched to Dodge and started a new team, the No. 25 Superguard truck driven by Randy Tolsma. Compton did not win, but collected six poles and finished fourth in points, while Tolsma had ten top-tens and finished 11th in points.

In 2000, Compton left for Melling Racing, and he was replaced by Mike Cope. Despite Cope putting together three top-twenty finishes, he was released from his ride. He was originally replaced by Doug George, then by rookie Scott Riggs. Riggs immediately clicked with the team, posting eight top-ten finishes during his tenure with the team, who finished 15th in owner's points that season. Tolsma, meanwhile, picked up a win at Nashville Speedway USA and finished eighth in points. The team added a third truck to its stable, the No. 12 Dodge driven by Carlos Contreras and sponsored by Hot Wheels. In his rookie season, Contreras had a pair of top-tens and finished 17th in points.

After the season, RC Cola, Supergard, Tolsma, Contreras, and Riggs all left the team. Miccosukee Gambling Group and the National Wild Turkey Federation originally signed to sponsor the 25 and 86 respectively trucks at the beginning of the season, as well as the team switching back to Ford, with Barry Bodine and Derrike Cope driving the two trucks. Bodine had two starts, the best of which being a 12th at Homestead, and Cope finishing 16th at Daytona. After Homestead however, the 25 shut down, and Cope left the 86. Jason White took over the 86, and had a best finish of 13th, but the team was starting to suffer big financial problems, and had to switch to a part-time schedule. Randy Briggs, Dana White, Jason Thom, and Rich Woodland Jr. all ran for the team, before Phil Bonifield finished out the year. At the end of the season, the team's mounting financial difficulties forced the team to close its doors. The equipment and owner's points were purchased by Bonifield.

== Truck No. 12 results ==
Year	Driver	No.	Make	1	2	3	4	5	6	7	8	9	10	11	12	13	14	15	16	17	18	19	20	21	22	23	24	25	NCTC	Pts
1999	Carlos Contreras	68	Dodge	HOM	PHO	EVG	MMR	MAR	MEM	PPR	I70	BRI	TEX	PIR	GLN	MLW	NSV	NZH	MCH	NHA	IRP	GTY	HPT	RCH	LVS	LVL	TEX	CAL; 14	74th	121
2000	Carlos Contreras	12	Dodge	DAY; 13	HOM; 33	PHO; 21	MMR; 27	MAR; 22	PIR; 18	GTY; 18	MEM; 18	PPR; 30	EVG; 19	TEX; 20		GLN; 8	MLW; 11	NHA; 21	NZH; 18	MCH; 20	IRP; 27	NSV; 19	CIC; 15	RCH; 19	DOV; 10	TEX; 15	CAL; 26		17th	2529
2000	Doug George	12	Dodge												KEN; 16														17th	2529
2001	Rich Woodland Jr.	12	Dodge	DAY; 35	HOM	MMR																							63rd	158
2001	Jason Thom	12	Chevy				MAR; 21	GTY	DAR	PPR	DOV	TEX	MEM	MLW	KAN	KEN	NHA	IRP	NSH>	CIC	NZH	RCH	SBO	TEX	LVS	PHO	CAL		63rd	158

== Truck No. 25 results ==
Year	Driver	No.	Make	1	2	3	4	5	6	7	8	9	10	11	12	13	14	15	16	17	18	19	20	21	22	23	24	25	NCTC	Pts
1999	Randy Tolsma	25	Dodge	HOM; 17*	PHO; 15	EVG; 11	MMR; 13	MAR; 7	MEM; 8	PPR; 26	I70; 8	BRI; 16	TEX; 17	PIR; 6	GLN; 13	MLW; 8	NSV; 21	NZH; 5	MCH; 15	NHA; 10	IRP; 9	GTY; 16	HPT; 13	RCH; 8	LVS; 16	LVL; 25	TEX; 5	CAL; 12	11th	3173
2000	Randy Tolsma	25	Dodge	DAY; 15	HOM; 6	PHO; 31	MMR; 25*	MAR; 7	PIR; 29	GTY; 3	MEM; 7	PPR; 12	EVG; 2*	TEX; 3	KEN; 6	GLN; 10	MLW; 2	NHA; 3	NZH; 31	MCH; 10	IRP; 10	NSV; 1	CIC; 10	RCH; 34	DOV; 16		CAL; 20		8th	3157
2000	Randy Tolsma	25	Chevy																							TEX; 7			8th	3157
2001	Barry Bodine	25	Ford	DAY; 36																									43rd	542
2001	Barry Bodine	25	Dodge		HOM; 12	MMR	MAR	GTY	DAR	PPR	DOV	TEX	MEM	MLW	KAN	KEN	NHA	IRP											43rd	542
2001	Phil Bonifield	25	Chevy																NSH; 27	CIC	NZH	RCH	SBO; 36	TEX; 31		PHO; DNQ			43rd	542
2001	Jonathon Price	25	Chevy																						LVS; 36				43rd	542
2001	Lance Hooper	25	Chevy																								CAL; 33		43rd	542

== Truck No. 86 results ==
Year	Driver	No.	Make	1	2	3	4	5	6	7	8	9	10	11	12	13	14	15	16	17	18	19	20	21	22	23	24	25	26	27	NCTC	Pts
1997	Stacy Compton	86	Ford	WDW; 10	TUS; 16	HOM; 34	PHO; 33	POR; 12	EVG; 8	I70; 30	NHA; 15	TEX; 16	BRI; 25	NZH; 14	MLW; 21	LVL; 6	CNS; 3	HPT; 13	IRP; 26	FLM; 14	NSV; 5	GLN; 25	RCH; 18	MAR; 9	SON; 10	MMR; 2	CAL; 17	PHO; 14	LVS; 12		13th	3057
1998	Stacy Compton	86	Ford	WDW; 30	HOM; 6	PHO; 3	POR; 1*	EVG; 4	I70; 11	GLN; 19	TEX; 5	BRI; 37	MLW; 13	NZH; 2	CAL; 14	PPR; 7	IRP; 13	NHA; 9	FLM; 28*	NSV; 9	HPT; 1	LVL; 4	RCH; 23	MEM; 16	GTY; 26	MAR; 4	SON; 15	MMR; 3	PHO; 8	LVS; 17	7th	3542
1999	Stacy Compton	86	Dodge	HOM; 3	PHO; 4	EVG; 4	MMR; 3	MAR; 2	MEM; 4	PPR; 28	I70; 4	BRI; 2	TEX; 9	PIR; 17	GLN; 15	MLW; 10	NSV; 27	NZH; 10	MCH; 6	NHA; 3*	IRP; 2	GTY; 4	HPT; 21	RCH; 11	LVS; 6	LVL; 13	TEX; 12	CAL; 3			4th	3623
2000	Mike Cope	86	Dodge	DAY; 12	HOM; 15	PHO; 20	MMR; 22	MAR; 36	PIR; 23																						15th	2656
2000	Doug George	86	Dodge							GTY; 33																					15th	2656
2000	Scott Riggs	86	Dodge								MEM; 12	PPR; 9	EVG; 9	TEX; 10	KEN; 23	GLN; 24	MLW; 9	NHA; 6	NZH; 27	MCH; 11	IRP; 15	NSV; 7	CIC; 30	RCH; 5	DOV; 19						15th	2656
2000	Derrike Cope	86	Dodge																							TEX; 23	CAL; 28				15th	2656
2001	Derrike Cope	86	Ford	DAY; 16	HOM; 23																										25th	1532
2001	Jason White	86	Ford			MMR; 16	MAR; 13	GTY; 31	DAR; 25	PPR; 18	DOV; 29	TEX	MEM	MLW																	25th	1532
2001	Randy Briggs	86	Ford												KAN; 18	KEN	NHA														25th	1532
2001	Dana White	86	Chevy															IRP; 26	NSH	CIC; 34	NZH	RCH; 35	SBO; 23			PHO; 25					25th	1532
2001	Rich Woodland Jr.	86	Chevy																					TEX; 33							25th	1532
2001	Phil Bonifield	86	Chevy																						LVS; 24		CAL; 24				25th	1532

== Sources ==
- David Hodson - NASCAR Owner
- Racing Reference
