= Jay Sauter =

American racing driver (born 1962)

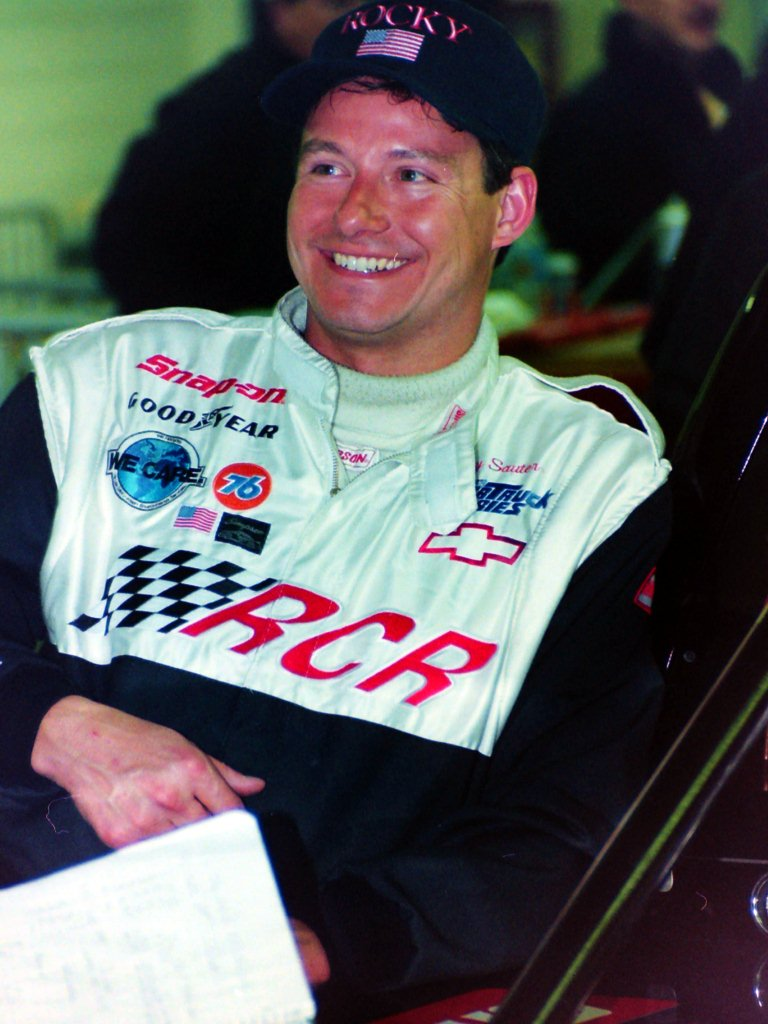
- Sauter in 1996
- Born: Jason Garrett Sauter; June 22, 1962 (age 64); Necedah, Wisconsin, U.S.

NASCAR Cup Series career
- 2 races run over 1 year
- Best finish: 70th (2002)
- First race: 2002 Samsung/Radio Shack 500 (Texas)
- Last race: 2002 EA Sports 500 (Talladega)
Wins	Top tens	Poles
0	0	0

NASCAR O'Reilly Auto Parts Series career
- 130 races run over 8 years
- Best finish: 16th (2000)
- First race: 2000 Alltel 200 (Rockingham)
- Last race: 2007 Pepsi 300 (Nashville)
Wins	Top tens	Poles
0	23	1

NASCAR FedEx Freight Truck Series career
- 90 races run over 5 years
- Best finish: 4th (1998)
- First race: 1996 Florida Dodge Dealers 400 (Homestead)
- Last race: 2004 Darlington 200 (Darlington)
- First win: 1997 Pennzoil Discount Center 200 (Loudon)
- Last win: 1999 O'Reilly 300 (Texas)
Wins	Top tens	Poles
4	50	2
- Statistics up to date as of July 6, 2012.

Jason Garrett Sauter (born June 22, 1962) is an American former professional stock car racing driver. He previously drove the No. 34 Chevrolet Monte Carlo for Frank Cicci Racing in the Busch Series. Sauter is the son of former NASCAR driver Jim Sauter, and the brother of fellow drivers Tim Sauter and Johnny Sauter. He also is an uncle to Travis Sauter (son of Tim).

== Racing career ==
Sauter, a former American Speed Association driver, made his NASCAR debut in 1996 in the Craftsman Truck Series. Driving the No. 42 Team SABCO Chevrolet Silverado, he qualified 21st and finished eighth at the Homestead–Miami Speedway. He ran six more races for SABCO that year. His best finish was third at Bristol Motor Speedway, and was offered a ride for one of SABCO's Cup teams, but he chose to decline the offer. He ended the season driving the No. 03 RealTree Camouflage Chevy for Richard Childress Racing at Las Vegas Motor Speedway, finishing 22nd.

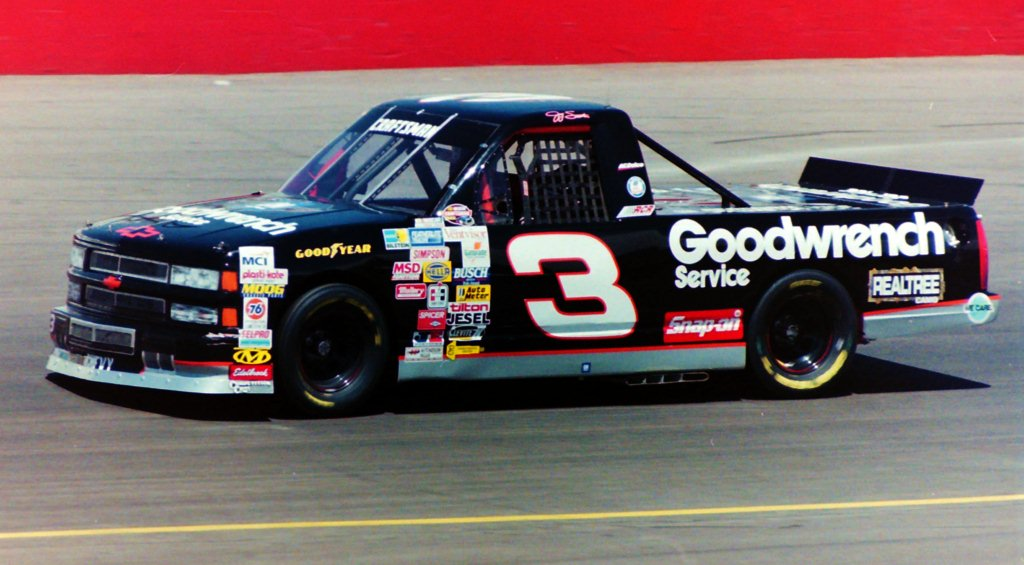
Sauter's 1997 truck

In 1997, Sauter replaced Mike Skinner in Childress' No. 3 GM Goodwrench entry in the truck series. Sauter won his first career race at New Hampshire Motor Speedway. He had 15 top-ten finishes that season and finished sixth in the final points standings. In 1998, Sauter picked up his second career win at Martinsville Speedway and moved up to a career-high fourth in points. The next year, he won at Louisville and Texas but dropped to fifth in points.

In 2000, Sauter moved up to the Busch Series, driving the No. 43 Quality Farm & Country Stores Chevrolet Monte Carlo for the Curb Agajanian Performance Group. He had eight top-ten finishes, was 17th in the championship points, and was fourth in the Rookie of the Year chase. In 2001, Sauter won his first career pole at Kentucky Speedway. At Memphis, Sauter had a chance to pick up his first Busch Series win; but with two laps to go, Jeff Green drove hard in to turn 3, and both cars washed up the track, allowing Randy LaJoie to slip by for the win. Despite the great run for Sauter, he was released from the team after this race. He missed the next two races at Phoenix and Rockingham before getting a ride in the No. 25 U.S. Marine Corps Chevrolet for Ed Rensi.

For 2002, Sauter returned to RCR and shared the No. 21 Rockwell Automation Chevy with Jeff Green. In thirteen starts with RCR, his best finish was a fourth at Nashville Superspeedway. He concluded the season driving the No. 02 Ford Taurus for Angela's Motorsports, finishing 25th at the Ford 300. He also made his Winston Cup debut in the No. 71 for Marcis Auto Racing, finishing 37th at Texas and 43rd at Talladega Superspeedway. In 2003, he ran ten races for Henderson Bros. Racing, finishing ninth at Nashville. In 2004, he ran nine races for the Henderson brothers, his best finish a 13th at Richmond International Raceway. He also returned to the truck series, driving four races in the No. 06 for MRD Motorsports and finishing 15th at Bristol.

After making only one start in the Busch Series in 2005, Sauter returned in 2006 with a new team, Duesenberg & Leik Motorsports. He qualified for 33 of 35 races with a best finish of seventh at O'Reilly Raceway Park. After the No. 01 team merged with Davis Motorsports, Sauter joined Frank Cicci Racing in 2007, running a few races before the team suspended operations.

Sauter currently competes in local races on short tracks in Wisconsin.

== Motorsports career results ==
=== NASCAR ===
(key) (Bold – Pole position awarded by qualifying time. Italics – Pole position earned by points standings or practice time. * – Most laps led.)

==== Winston Cup Series ====
NASCAR Winston Cup Series results
Year	Team	No.	Make	1	2	3	4	5	6	7	8	9	10	11	12	13	14	15	16	17	18	19	20	21	22	23	24	25	26	27	28	29	30	31	32	33	34	35	36	NWCC	Pts	Ref
1996	Team SABCO	40	Pontiac	DAY	CAR	RCH	ATL	DAR	BRI	NWS	MAR	TAL	SON	CLT	DOV	POC	MCH	DAY	NHA	POC	TAL	IND	GLN	MCH	BRI	DAR; DNQ														N/A	0	
1996	Team SABCO	40	Chevy																								RCH; DNQ	DOV	MAR	NWS	CLT	CAR	PHO	ATL						N/A	0	
2002	Marcis Auto Racing	71	Chevy	DAY	CAR	LVS	ATL	DAR	BRI	TEX; 37	MAR	TAL	CAL	RCH	CLT	DOV	POC	MCH	SON	DAY	CHI	NHA	POC	IND	GLN	MCH	BRI	DAR	RCH	NHA	DOV	KAN	TAL; 43	CLT	MAR	ATL	CAR	PHO	HOM	70th	86	

==== Busch Series ====
NASCAR Busch Series results
Year	Team	No.	Make	1	2	3	4	5	6	7	8	9	10	11	12	13	14	15	16	17	18	19	20	21	22	23	24	25	26	27	28	29	30	31	32	33	34	35	NBSC	Pts	Ref
1996	Shoemaker Racing	64	Chevy	DAY	CAR	RCH	ATL	NSV	DAR	BRI	HCY	NZH	CLT	DOV	SBO	MYB	GLN	MLW; QL^{†}	NHA	TAL	IRP	MCH	BRI	DAR	RCH	DOV	CLT	CAR	HOM										NA	-	
1999	Buckshot Racing	00	Pontiac	DAY	CAR	LVS	ATL	DAR	TEX	NSV	BRI	TAL	CAL	NHA	RCH	NZH	CLT	DOV	SBO	GLN	MLW; QL^{‡}	MYB	PPR	GTY	IRP	MCH	BRI	DAR	RCH	DOV	CLT	CAR	MEM	PHO	HOM				N/A	N/A	
2000	Curb/Agajanian Motorsports	43	Chevy	DAY; 4	CAR; 14	LVS; DNQ	ATL; 39	DAR; 22	BRI; 31	TEX; 19	NSV; 6	TAL; 27	CAL; 10	RCH; 36	NHA; 16	CLT; 35	DOV; 30	SBO; 40	MYB; 10	GLN; 8	MLW; 27	NZH; 10	PPR; 27	GTY; 18	IRP; 32	MCH; 32	BRI; 6	DAR; 22	RCH; 25	DOV; 30	CLT; 25	CAR; 20	MEM; 9	PHO; 43	HOM; 13				16th	3037	
2001	Curb/Agajanian Motorsports	43	Chevy	DAY; 25	CAR; 11	LVS; 10	ATL; 13	DAR; 36	BRI; 22	TEX; 3	NSH; 39	TAL; 7	CAL; 28	RCH; 10	NHA; 32	NZH; 15	CLT; 34	DOV; 23	**KEN**; 9	MLW; 33	GLN; 12	CHI; 38	GTY; 25	PPR; 17	IRP; 14	MCH; 15	BRI; 10	DAR; 30	RCH; 39	DOV; 18	KAN; 14	CLT; 28	MEM; 4	PHO	CAR				19th	3084	
2001	Team Rensi Motorsports	25	Chevy																																	HOM; 22			19th	3084	
2002	Richard Childress Racing	21	Chevy	DAY	CAR	LVS	DAR	BRI	TEX	NSH; 15	TAL; 30	CAL	RCH	NHA; 30	NZH; 7			NSH; 4	KEN; 21	MLW; 13	DAY; 37	CHI	GTY; 13	PPR; 17	IRP; 36	MCH	BRI	DAR	RCH	DOV	KAN	CLT	MEM; 8	ATL	CAR				36th	1525	
2002	Richard Childress Racing	2	Chevy													CLT; 9	DOV																						36th	1525	
2002	Angela's Motorsports	02	Ford																																	PHO; DNQ	HOM; 25		36th	1525	
2003	Henderson Motorsports	75	Chevy	DAY; DNQ	CAR	LVS	DAR	BRI; 36	TEX	TAL	NSH; 24	CAL	RCH; 40	GTY	NZH	CLT	DOV	NSH; 9	KEN; 40	MLW; 17	DAY	CHI	NHA	PPR	IRP	MCH	BRI; 40	DAR	RCH; 26	DOV	KAN	CLT	MEM; 13	ATL	PHO	CAR; 28	HOM		49th	818	
2004	Henderson Motorsports	75	Chevy	DAY	CAR	LVS	DAR	BRI; 39	TEX	NSH; 36	TAL	CAL	GTY	RCH; 13	NZH	CLT	DOV	NSH; 16	KEN; 40	MLW	DAY	CHI	NHA	PPR	IRP	MCH	BRI; 31	CAL	RCH; DNQ	DOV	KAN	CLT	MEM	ATL	PHO	DAR	HOM		63rd	453	
2005	Henderson Motorsports	75	Chevy	DAY	CAL	MXC	LVS	ATL	NSH	BRI; DNQ	TEX	PHO	TAL	DAR	RCH	CLT	DOV	NSH	KEN	MLW	DAY	CHI	NHA	PPR	GTY	IRP	GLN	MCH	BRI; 40	CAL	RCH	DOV	KAN	CLT	MEM	TEX	PHO	HOM	139th	43	
2006	Duesenberg & Leik Motorsports	01	Chevy	DAY; DNQ	CAL; 41	MXC; 24	LVS; 34	ATL; 29	BRI; 23	TEX; 40	NSH; 18	PHO; DNQ	TAL; 15	RCH; 17	DAR; 40	CLT; 39	DOV; 20	NSH; 13	KEN; 29	MLW; 11	DAY; 36	CHI; 27	NHA; 19	MAR; 10	GTY; 11	IRP; 7	GLN; 26	MCH; 26	BRI; 43	CAL; 10	RCH; 17	DOV; 31	KAN; 29	CLT; 40	MEM; 26	TEX; 39	PHO; 17	HOM; 30	21st	2879	
2007	Frank Cicci Racing	34	Chevy	DAY	CAL; 28	MXC	LVS; 21	ATL; DNQ	BRI; 15	NSH; 28	TEX	PHO	TAL	RCH	DAR	CLT	DOV	NSH	KEN	MLW	NHA	DAY	CHI	GTY	IRP	CGV	GLN	MCH	BRI	CAL	RCH	DOV	KAN	CLT	MEM	TEX	PHO	HOM	83rd	376	
^{†} - Qualified for Dick Trickle· ^{‡} - Qualified for Buckshot Jones

==== Craftsman Truck Series ====
NASCAR Craftsman Truck Series results
Year	Team	No.	Make	1	2	3	4	5	6	7	8	9	10	11	12	13	14	15	16	17	18	19	20	21	22	23	24	25	26	27	NCTC	Pts	Ref
1996	Team SABCO	42	Chevy	HOM; 8	PHO; 11	POR	EVG	TUS	CNS; 9	HPT; 5	BRI; 3	NZH	MLW; 25	LVL	I70	IRP; 6	FLM	GLN	NSV	RCH	NHA	MAR	NWS	SON	MMR	PHO					26th	1065	
1996	Richard Childress Racing	03	Chevy																								LVS; 22				26th	1065	
1997	Richard Childress Racing	3	Chevy	WDW; 4	TUS; 3	HOM; 19	PHO; 11	POR; 10	EVG; 30	I70; 31	NHA; 1	TEX; 11	BRI; 3	NZH; 9	MLW; 2	LVL; 31	CNS; 4	HPT; 16	IRP; 31	FLM; 6	NSV; 13	GLN; 12	RCH; 3	MAR; 7	SON; 3	MMR; 4	CAL; 25	PHO; 7	LVS; 4		6th	3467	
1998	Richard Childress Racing	3	Chevy	WDW; 7	HOM; 3	PHO; 6	POR; 8	EVG; 16	I70; 16	GLN; 2	TEX; 16	BRI; 12	MLW; 14	NZH; 3	CAL; 24	PPR; 22	IRP; 10	NHA; 11	FLM; 13	NSV; 15	HPT; 7	LVL; 20	RCH; 17	MEM; 2	GTY; 3	MAR; 1	SON; 8	MMR; 8	PHO; 12	LVS; 4	4th	3672	
1999	Richard Childress Racing	3	Chevy	HOM; 21	PHO; 8	EVG; 19	MMR; 11	MAR; 11	MEM; 3	PPR; 9	I70; 14	BRI; 7	**TEX**; 2	PIR; 8	GLN; 6	MLW; 9	NSV; 12	NZH; 4	MCH; 2	NHA; 11	IRP; 6	GTY; 18	HPT; 3	RCH; 36	LVS; 5	LVL; 1	**TEX**; 1	CAL; 10			5th	3543	
2004	MRD Motorsports	06	Chevy	DAY	ATL	MAR	MFD	CLT	DOV	TEX	MEM	MLW	KAN	KEN; 31	GTW	MCH	IRP	NSH; 21	BRI; 15	RCH; DNQ	NHA	LVS	CAL	TEX; DNQ	MAR	PHO	DAR; 26	HOM			48th	373	
