= Jerry Kobza =

American racing driver

- Born: March 18, 1969 (age 57); Sacramento, California, U.S.

NASCAR FedEx Freight Truck Series career
- 1 race run over 1 year
- Best finish: 76th (1999)
- First race: 1999 Memphis 200 (Memphis)
Wins	Top tens	Poles
0	0	0
- Statistics up to date as of March 15, 2019.

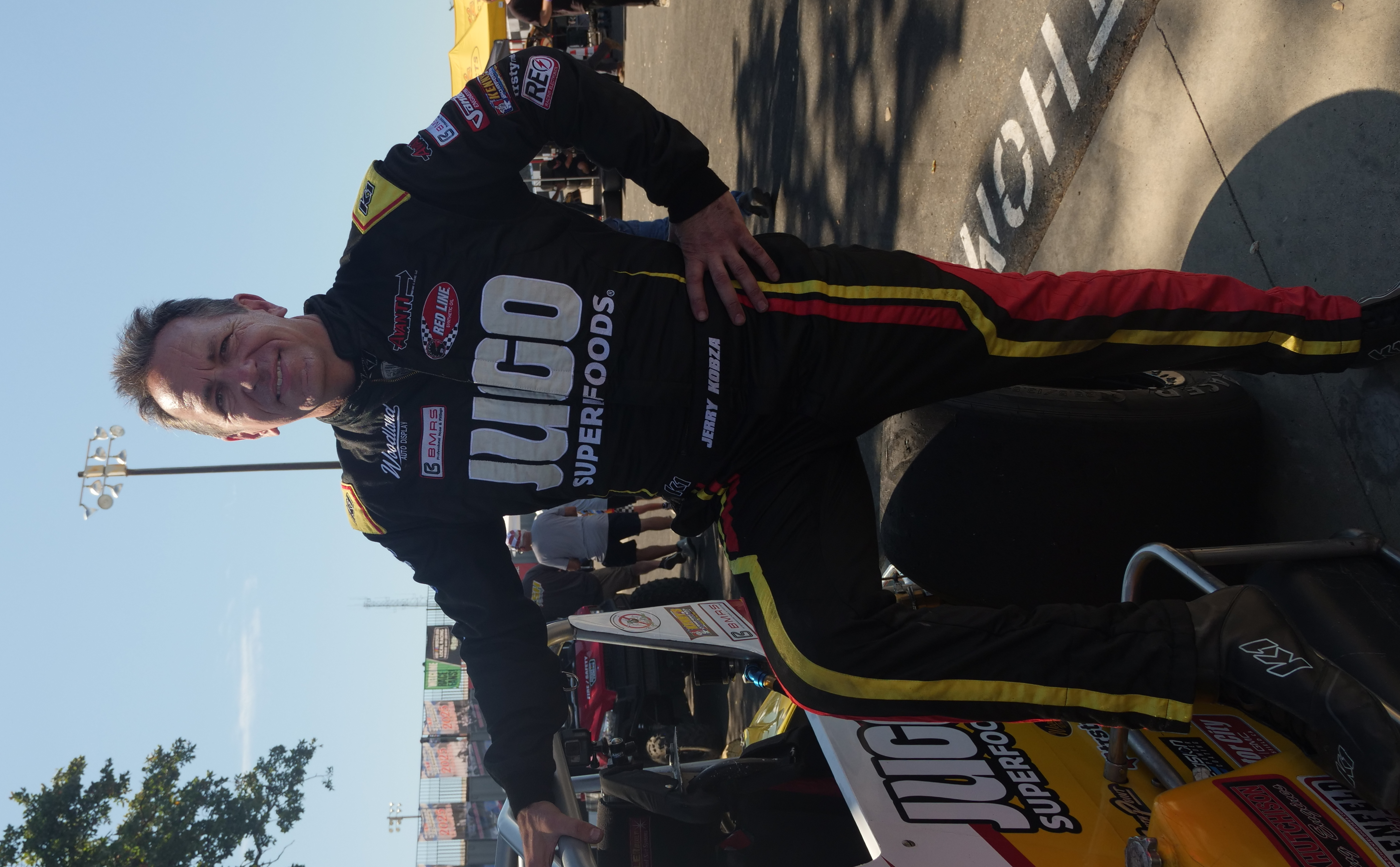
Jerry Kobza next to his sprint car

Jerry Kobza (born March 18, 1969) is a USAC and CRSA driver in the open-wheel ranks of racing, collecting a handful of championships. In 1999, he made his only career NASCAR Craftsman Truck Series start, which came for Team Racing at Memphis Motorsports Park. He qualified the truck in 34th position, but ended in 35th place with engine problems.

Kobza is from Sacramento, California.

== Motorsports career results ==
=== NASCAR ===
==== Craftsman Truck Series ====
NASCAR Craftsman Truck Series results
Year	Team	No.	Make	1	2	3	4	5	6	7	8	9	10	11	12	13	14	15	16	17	18	19	20	21	22	23	24	25	NCTC	Pts	Ref
1999	Team Racing	23	Chevy	HOM	PHO	EVG	MMR	MAR	MEM; 35	PPR	I70	BRI	TEX	PIR	GLN	MLW	NSV	NZH	MCH	NHA	IRP	GTY	HPT						76th	147	
1999	Shenandoah Valley Motorsports	11	Ford																					RCH; DNQ	LVS	LVL; DNQ	TEX	CAL	76th	147	
