= Mike Cope =

American stock car racing driver and team owner

- Born: May 8, 1962 (age 64); Pinellas Park, Florida, U.S.
- Achievements: 1994, 1996 Slim Jim All Pro Series Champion; 1993, 1994, 1995 Winchester 400 Winner

NASCAR O'Reilly Auto Parts Series career
- 18 races run over 2 years
- Best finish: 40th (1998)
- First race: 1996 Stanley 200 (Loudon)
- Last race: 1998 Myrtle Beach 250 (Myrtle Beach)
Wins	Top tens	Poles
0	2	0

NASCAR FedEx Freight Truck Series career
- 13 races run over 3 years
- Best finish: 40th (1997)
- First race: 1997 Florida Dodge Dealers 400 (Homestead)
- Last race: 2000 Line-X 225 (Portland)
Wins	Top tens	Poles
0	0	0
- Statistics up to date as of February 16, 2012.

Mike Cope (born May 8, 1962) is an American former stock car racing driver. A two-time champion of the NASCAR Slim Jim All Pro Series, he also competed in the NASCAR Busch Series and NASCAR Craftsman Truck Series. He is no relation to Daytona 500 winner Derrike Cope.

== Early career ==
Cope began his NASCAR career in 1989, competing in the Slim Jim All Pro Series, a regional touring series centered on the southeastern United States. He won two series championships, in 1994 and 1996, as well as being voted Most Popular Driver three times. In addition, he won the prestigious Winchester 400 three years in a row, from 1993 to 1995.

== NASCAR touring series ==
Cope made his debut at the major-league NASCAR level in 1996 in the Busch Series at the Milwaukee Mile. Driving the No. 58 he finished 25th, three laps down. In 1997, he attempted to move full-time to the Craftsman Truck Series, driving the No. 15 for Billy Ballew Motorsports. His first race was at Homestead-Miami Speedway, where he finished 22nd. He ran in five other races over the course of the year before being released from his contract, with a best finish of 12th at New Hampshire International Speedway.

In 1998, Cope attempted to move full-time to the Busch Series, driving the No. 30 for Team 34. Running in 17 races, his best finish was seventh at Hickory Speedway, however inconsistent performance led him to be released by the team following the series' race at Myrtle Beach Speedway, being replaced in the No. 30 by Todd Bodine.

Cope ran a single race in the Craftsman Truck Series in 1999, at Las Vegas Motor Speedway where he finished 14th, before once more attempting the full series schedule in 2000 for Impact Motorsports in the No. 86, with sponsorship from R.C. Cola. Despite the team having had good performance the previous year with Stacy Compton driving, Cope struggled, posting a best finish of 12th in six races with the team, that coming in the first race of the season at Daytona International Speedway. At the seventh race of the season, at Gateway International Raceway, Cope did not accompany the team to the track; he was subsequently released, being replaced in the No. 86 by Scott Riggs.

== Post-NASCAR career ==
Following his departure from Impact Motorsports, Cope moved to the American Speed Association, starting his own race team in Hudson, Florida and running the No. 25 Chevrolet with sponsorship from Manheim Auto Auctions. He ran in the series, building and driving his own cars, through 2005 when he retired, planning to focus on the racing career of his son, Travis Cope as driver, competing in Super Late Model events. Mike Cope Racing presently fields five cars in SCCA pro Trans Am 2 road racing with multiple wins and pole awards. In 2013, Cope became an authorized chassis builder for the TA2 series.

== Track owner ==
In 2001, Cope bought Bronson Motor Speedway, a paved oval track located 12 miles (19 km) west of Gainesville, Florida which he owned and operated for ten years before selling the track in 2011.

== Motorsports career results ==
=== Busch Series ===
NASCAR Busch Series results
Year	Team	No.	Make	1	2	3	4	5	6	7	8	9	10	11	12	13	14	15	16	17	18	19	20	21	22	23	24	25	26	27	28	29	30	31	NBSC	Pts	Ref
1995				DAY	CAR	RCH	ATL	NSV	DAR	BRI	HCY	NHA	NZH; DNQ	CLT	DOV	MYB	sGLN	MLW	TAL	SBO	IRP	MCH	BRI	DAR	RCH	DOV	CLT	CAR	HOM						NA	0	
1996	KEL Racing	58	Chevy	DAY	CAR	RCH	ATL	NSV	DAR	BRI	HCY	NZH	CLT	DOV	SBO	MYB	GLN	MLW	NHA; 25	TAL	IRP; DNQ	MCH	BRI	DAR	RCH	DOV	CLT	CAR	HOM						90th	88	
1998	Team 34	30	Chevy	DAY; 42	CAR; 34	LVS; 40	NSV; 40	DAR; 40	BRI; 15	TEX; 24	HCY; 7	TAL; 18	NHA; 38	NZH; 30	CLT; DNQ	DOV; 33	RCH; 33	PPR; 9	GLN; 35	MLW; 26	MYB; 31	CAL	SBO	IRP	MCH	BRI	DAR	RCH	DOV	CLT	GTY	CAR	ATL	HOM	40th	1292	

Sporting positions
Preceded by Jody Ridley	NASCAR Slim Jim All Pro Series Champion; 1994	Succeeded by Hal Goodson
Preceded by Hal Goodson	NASCAR Slim Jim All Pro Series Champion; 1996	Succeeded by Hal Goodson
