= NASCAR O'Reilly Auto Parts Series at Bristol Motor Speedway =

Annual NASCAR races held at Bristol Motor Speedway

NASCAR O'Reilly Auto Parts Series
- Venue: Bristol Motor Speedway
- Location: Bristol, Tennessee, United States

Circuit information
- Surface: Concrete
- Length: 0.533 mi (0.858 km)
- Turns: 4

Stock car racing events in the NASCAR O'Reilly Auto Parts Series have been held at Bristol Motor Speedway, in Bristol, Tennessee during numerous seasons and times of year since the series’ inception in 1982. From 2021 to 2023, the series has had one date. However, when the 2025 schedule was announced, the series returned to 2 dates.

== Spring race ==
Suburban Propane 300
- Corporate sponsor: Suburban Propane
- First race: 1982
- Distance: 159.9 miles (257.33 km)
- Laps: 300; Stages 1/2: 85 each Final stage: 130
- Previous names: Southeastern 150 (1982–1983); Budweiser 200 (1985–1989); Budweiser 250 (1990–1993); Goody's 250 (1994–1995); Goody's Headache Powder 250 (1996); Moore's Snacks 250 (1997–1999); Cheez-It 250 (2000–2001); Channellock 250 (2002–2003); Sharpie Professional 250 (2004–2005); Sharpie Mini 300 (2006–2008); Scotts Turf Builder 300 (2009–2010); Scotts EZ Seed 300 (2011); Ford EcoBoost 300 (2012); Jeff Foxworthy's Grit Chips 300 (2013); Drive to Stop Diabetes 300 (2014–2015); Fitzgerald Glider Kits 300 (2016–2018); Alsco 300 (2019); Cheddar's 300 (2020); SciAps 300 (2025)
- Most wins (driver): Kyle Busch (4)
- Most wins (team): Joe Gibbs Racing (7)
- Most wins (manufacturer): Chevrolet (19)

The Suburban Propane 300 is a NASCAR O'Reilly Auto Parts Series stock car race at Bristol Motor Speedway, the first of two Bristol races on the schedule. Connor Zilisch is the defending race winner.

=== History ===
The first Busch Series race at Bristol was 150 laps, and was won by Phil Parsons in 1982. The race was not held in 1984. The race increased in length several times since then: it was lengthened to 200 laps in 1985, 250 laps in 1990, and 300 laps in 2006.

In 2016, the race format was changed to include two 50-lap heat races and a 200-lap feature for a total of 300 laps, as part of the Xfinity Dash 4 Cash program. In 2017 that format did not return and instead reverted to its 300-lap distance with the new stage format. Stages 1 and 2 were 85 laps each, with stage 3 being the final 130 laps.

The race was removed from the 2021 schedule as the Xfinity Series did not follow the NASCAR Cup and NASCAR Craftsman Truck Series in switching their first Bristol races to the dirt configuration. When the Cup and Truck spring race returned to the concrete surface in 2024, the Xfinity date was not reinstated. The spring date returned in 2025, and became a night race in 2026.

=== Past winners ===
Year	Date	No.	Driver	Team	Manufacturer	Race Distance		Race Time	Average Speed (mph)	Report	Ref
Year	Date	No.	Driver	Team	Manufacturer	Laps	Miles (km)	Race Time	Average Speed (mph)	Report	Ref
1982	March 13	28	Phil Parsons	Johnny Hayes Racing	Pontiac	150	79.95 (128.667)	0:59:20	80.848	Report	
1983	May 21	7	Morgan Shepherd	Whitaker Racing	Oldsmobile	150	79.95 (128.667)	0:56:16	85.255	Report	
1984	Not held										
1985	March 30	17	Darrell Waltrip	DarWal, Inc.	Chevrolet	200	106.6 (171.556)	1:26:00	74.372	Report	
1986	April 5	77	Morgan Shepherd	Morgan Shepherd	Buick	200	106.6 (171.556)	1:26:00	71.511	Report	
1987	April 11	97	Morgan Shepherd	Morgan Shepherd	Buick	200	106.6 (171.556)	1:25:16	75.032	Report	
1988	April 9	8	Dale Earnhardt	Dale Earnhardt, Inc.	Chevrolet	200	106.6 (171.556)	1:28:38	76.162	Report	
1989	April 10	75	Rick Wilson	Charlie Henderson	Oldsmobile	200	106.6 (171.556)	1:14:34	85.776	Report	
1990	April 7	2	L. D. Ottinger	Parker Racing	Oldsmobile	250	133.25 (214.445)	1:40:01	79.936	Report	
1991	April 13	44	Bobby Labonte	Labonte Motorsports	Oldsmobile	250	133.25 (214.445)	1:26:07	92.839	Report	
1992	April 4	7	Harry Gant	Whitaker Racing	Buick	250	133.25 (214.445)	1:26:02	92.929	Report	
1993	April 3	30	Michael Waltrip	Bahari Racing	Pontiac	250	133.25 (214.445)	1:42:37	77.911	Report	
1994	April 9	44	David Green	Labonte Motorsports	Chevrolet	250	133.25 (214.445)	1:38:36	81.085	Report	
1995	April 1	29	Steve Grissom	Diamond Ridge Motorsports	Chevrolet	250	133.25 (214.445)	1:29:10	89.664	Report	
1996	March 30	60	Mark Martin	Roush Racing	Ford	250	133.25 (214.445)	1:33:19	85.783	Report	
1997	April 12	9	Jeff Burton	Roush Racing	Ford	250	133.25 (214.445)	1:46:58	74.743	Report	
1998	March 28	66	Elliott Sadler	Diamond Ridge Motorsports	Chevrolet	250	133.25 (214.445)	1:45:55	75.484	Report	
1999	April 10	57	Jason Keller	Progressive Motorsports	Chevrolet	250	133.25 (214.445)	1:49:30	73.014	Report	
2000	March 25	82	Sterling Marlin	SABCO Racing	Chevrolet	250	133.25 (214.445)	1:46:52	74.813	Report	
2001	March 24	17	Matt Kenseth	Reiser Enterprises	Chevrolet	250	133.25 (214.445)	1:50:53	72.103	Report	
2002	March 23	21	Jeff Green	Richard Childress Racing	Chevrolet	250	133.25 (214.445)	2:00:58	66.093	Report	
2003	March 22	21	Kevin Harvick	Richard Childress Racing	Chevrolet	250	133.25 (214.445)	1:57:03	68.304	Report	
2004	March 27	8	Martin Truex Jr.	Chance 2 Motorsports	Chevrolet	250	133.25 (214.445)	1:42:21	78.114	Report	
2005	April 4*	29	Kevin Harvick	Richard Childress Racing	Chevrolet	256*	136.448 (219.591)	2:17:31	59.534	Report	
2006	March 25*	5	Kyle Busch	Hendrick Motorsports	Chevrolet	300	159.9 (257.334)	2:13:59	71.606	Report	
2007	March 24	60	Carl Edwards	Roush Fenway Racing	Ford	300	159.9 (257.334)	2:29:49	64.038	Report	
2008	March 15	2	Clint Bowyer	Richard Childress Racing	Chevrolet	171*	91.143 (146.68)	1:09:20	78.874	Report	
2009	March 21	33	Kevin Harvick	Kevin Harvick Inc.	Chevrolet	300	159.9 (257.334)	2:00:21	79.717	Report	
2010	March 20	12	Justin Allgaier	Penske Racing	Dodge	300	159.9 (257.334)	2:05:14	76.609	Report	
2011	March 19	18	Kyle Busch	Joe Gibbs Racing	Toyota	300	159.9 (257.334)	1:52:39	85.166	Report	
2012	March 17	2	Elliott Sadler	Richard Childress Racing	Chevrolet	300	159.9 (257.334)	1:41:16	94.74	Report	
2013	March 16	54	Kyle Busch	Joe Gibbs Racing	Toyota	300	159.9 (257.334)	1:57:11	81.872	Report	
2014	March 15	54	Kyle Busch	Joe Gibbs Racing	Toyota	300	159.9 (257.334)	1:50:04	87.165	Report	
2015	April 18	22	Joey Logano*	Team Penske	Ford	300	159.9 (257.334)	1:50:00	87.218	Report	
2016*	April 16	20	Erik Jones	Joe Gibbs Racing	Toyota	200	106.6 (171.556)	1:08:10	93.829	Report	
2017	April 22	20	Erik Jones	Joe Gibbs Racing	Toyota	300	159.9 (257.334)	2:21:38	67.738	Report	
2018	April 14	18	Ryan Preece	Joe Gibbs Racing	Toyota	300	159.9 (257.334)	2:21:57	67.857	Report	
2019	April 6	20	Christopher Bell	Joe Gibbs Racing	Toyota	300	159.9 (257.334)	1:45:03	91.328	Report	
2020	June 1*	9	Noah Gragson	JR Motorsports	Chevrolet	303*	161.499 (259.907)	2:19:03	69.687	Report	
2021 – 2024	Not held										
2025	April 12	17	Kyle Larson	Hendrick Motorsports	Chevrolet	300	159.9 (257.334)	1:52:06	85.584	Report	
2026	April 11	1	Connor Zilisch	JR Motorsports	Chevrolet	300	159.9 (257.334)	2:03:11	77.884	Report	
2027	April 10									Report	

- 2005 and 2020: Race extended due to a NASCAR overtime finish.
- 2005: Race postponed from Saturday to Monday due to rain.
- 2006: Race had a snow delay after 32 laps, which led to it finishing under the lights.
- 2008: Race shortened due to rain.
- 2015: Joey Logano won the race after leading all 300 laps.
- 2016: The main event was reduced to 200 laps, while the other 100 laps were divided into two heat races for the Xfinity Dash 4 Cash program.
- 2020: Race postponed from April 4 to May 30 due to the COVID-19 pandemic, then postponed until June 1 due to logistical issues resulting from the postponement of Cup race at Charlotte from May 27 to May 28.

==== Multiple winners (drivers) ====
# Wins	Driver	Years won
4	Kyle Busch	2006, 2011, 2013-2014
3	Morgan Shepherd	1983, 1986-1987
3	Kevin Harvick	2003, 2005, 2009
2	Elliott Sadler	1998, 2012
2	Erik Jones	2016-2017

==== Multiple winners (teams) ====
# Wins	Team	Years won
7	Joe Gibbs Racing	2011, 2013-2014, 2016-2019
5	Richard Childress Racing	2002-2003, 2005, 2008, 2012
3	Roush Fenway Racing	1996-1997, 2007
2	Whitaker Racing	1983, 1992
2	Morgan Shepherd	1986-1987
2	Dale Earnhardt, Inc./Chance 2	1988, 2004
2	Labonte Motorsports	1991, 1994
2	Diamond Ridge Motorsports	1995, 1998
2	Team Penske	2010, 2015
2	Hendrick Motorsports	2006, 2025
2	JR Motorsports	2020, 2026

==== Manufacturer wins ====
# Wins	Make	Years won
19	(United States) Chevrolet	1985, 1988, 1994-1995, 1998-2006, 2008-2009, 2012, 2020, 2025-2026
7	(Japan) Toyota	2011, 2013-2014, 2016-2019
4	(United States) Oldsmobile	1983, 1989-1991
4	(United States) Ford	1996-1997, 2007, 2015
3	(United States) Buick	1986-1987, 1992
2	(United States) Pontiac	1982, 1993
1	(United States) Dodge	2010

==== Qualifying race winners ====
Year	Date	Race	No.	Driver	Team	Manufacturer	Race Distance		Race Time	Average Speed (mph)
Year	Date	Race	No.	Driver	Team	Manufacturer	Laps	Miles (km)	Race Time	Average Speed (mph)
2016	April 16	1	20	Erik Jones	Joe Gibbs Racing	Toyota	50	26.65 (42.89)	0:13:16	121.047
2016	April 16	2	2	Austin Dillon	Richard Childress Racing	Chevrolet	50	26.65 (42.89)	0:13:15	120.977

== Summer race ==
Food City 300
- Corporate sponsor: Food City
- First race: 1982
- Distance: 159.9 miles (257.3 km)
- Laps: 300; Stages 1/2: 85; Final stage: 130
- Previous names: Pet Dairy 150 (1982); Free Service 150 (1983); Free 200 (1984); Tri-City Pontiac 200 (1985–1988); Jay Johnson 200 (1989); Jay Johnson 250 (1990–1991); Food City 250 (1992–2013)
- Most wins (driver): Kyle Busch (5)
- Most wins (team): Joe Gibbs Racing (7)
- Most wins (manufacturer): Chevrolet (21)

The Food City 300 is a NASCAR O'Reilly Auto Parts Series stock car race that takes place under the lights at Bristol Motor Speedway in Bristol, Tennessee. It is held the night before the NASCAR Cup Series race the Bass Pro Shops Night Race. Sheldon Creed is the defending race winner.

=== History ===
First held as a 150-lap event, the race has increased in length several times, first to 200 laps in 1985, and to 250 laps in 1990. In 2014, the length of the race was increased to 300 laps, making it the same number of laps as the spring race.

=== Past winners ===
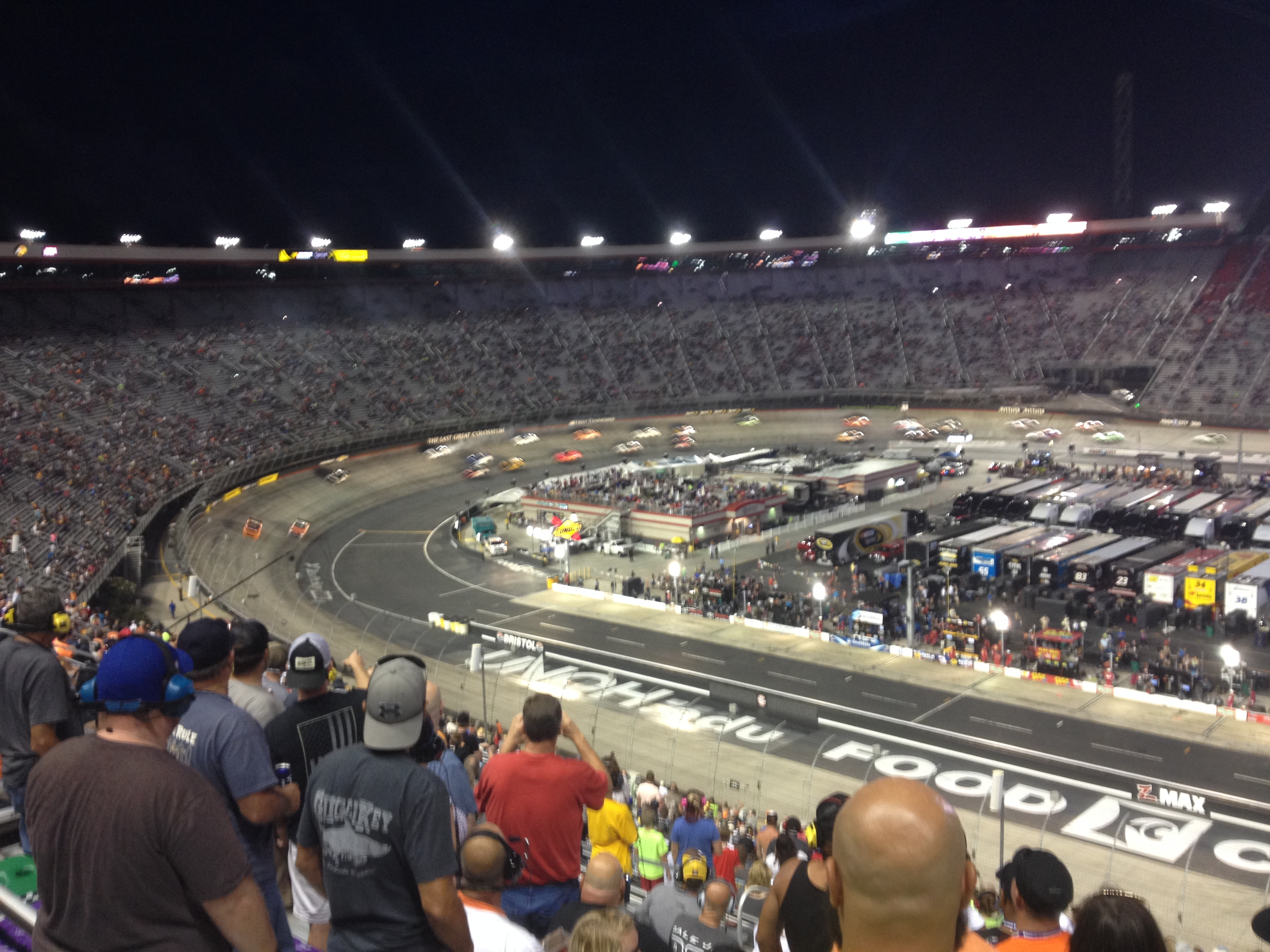
2016 Food City 300

Year	Date	No.	Driver	Team	Manufacturer	Race Distance		Race Time	Average Speed (mph)	Report	Ref
Year	Date	No.	Driver	Team	Manufacturer	Laps	Miles (km)	Race Time	Average Speed (mph)	Report	Ref
1982	August 27	11	Jack Ingram	Jack Ingram Racing	Pontiac	150	79.95 (128.667)	0:57:50	79.923	Report	
1983	August 26	00	Sam Ard	Thomas Brothers Racing	Oldsmobile	150	79.95 (128.667)	0:56:16	85.255	Report	
1984	August 24	1	Morgan Shepherd	Lindy White	Pontiac	200	106.6 (171.556)	1:24:18	75.872	Report	
1985	August 23	5	Brett Bodine	Hendrick Motorsports	Pontiac	200	106.6 (171.556)	1:29:40	71.331	Report	
1986	August 22	00	Brett Bodine	Thomas Brothers Racing	Oldsmobile	200	106.6 (171.556)	1:23:05	76.293	Report	
1987	August 21	21	Larry Pearson	David Pearson	Chevrolet	200	106.6 (171.556)	1:30:35	70.609	Report	
1988	August 26	21	Larry Pearson	David Pearson	Chevrolet	200	106.6 (171.556)	1:28:40	72.135	Report	
1989	August 25	1	Mark Martin	Bill Davis Racing	Ford	200	106.6 (171.556)	1:23:47	76.309	Report	
1990	August 24	22	Rick Mast	A.G. Dillard Motorsports	Buick	250	133.25 (214.445)	1:33:34	85.447	Report	
1991	August 23	32	Dale Jarrett	Dale Jarrett	Pontiac	250	133.25 (214.445)	1:51:19	71.822	Report	
1992	August 28	34	Todd Bodine	Team 34	Buick	250	133.25 (214.445)	1:39:09	80.635	Report	
1993	August 27	34	Todd Bodine	Team 34	Chevrolet	250	133.25 (214.445)	1:49:30	73.014	Report	
1994	August 26	8	Kenny Wallace	FILMAR Racing	Ford	250	133.25 (214.445)	1:31:15	87.616	Report	
1995	August 25	29	Steve Grissom	Diamond Ridge Motorsports	Chevrolet	250	133.25 (214.445)	1:31:39	87.234	Report	
1996	August 23	47	Jeff Fuller	ST Motorsports	Chevrolet	250	133.25 (214.445)	1:47:10	74.603	Report	
1997	August 22	20	Jimmy Spencer	Crestinger Racing	Chevrolet	250	133.25 (214.445)	2:02:02	65.515	Report	
1998	August 21	40	Kevin Lepage	Specialty Racing	Chevrolet	250	133.25 (214.445)	1:43:59	76.887	Report	
1999	August 27	17	Matt Kenseth	Reiser Enterprises	Chevrolet	250	133.25 (214.445)	1:35:27	83.761	Report	
2000	August 25	2	Kevin Harvick	Richard Childress Racing	Chevrolet	250	133.25 (214.445)	1:30:41	88.164	Report	
2001	August 24	2	Kevin Harvick	Richard Childress Racing	Chevrolet	250	133.25 (214.445)	1:41:22	78.872	Report	
2002	August 23	1	Jimmy Spencer	Phoenix Racing	Chevrolet	250	133.25 (214.445)	1:35:48	83.455	Report	
2003	August 22	99	Michael Waltrip	Michael Waltrip Racing	Chevrolet	250	133.25 (214.445)	1:51:07	71.951	Report	
2004	August 27	81	Dale Earnhardt Jr.	Chance 2 Motorsports	Chevrolet	256*	136.448 (219.591)	2:06:12	64.872	Report	
2005	August 26	39	Ryan Newman	Penske Racing	Dodge	252*	134.316 (216.160)	2:17:02	58.81	Report	
2006	August 25	17	Matt Kenseth	Roush Racing	Ford	250	133.25 (214.445)	2:04:02	64.458	Report	
2007	August 24	9	Kasey Kahne	Gillett Evernham Motorsports	Dodge	250	133.25 (214.445)	1:45:02	76.119	Report	
2008	August 22	88	Brad Keselowski	JR Motorsports	Chevrolet	250	133.25 (214.445)	1:25:30	93.509	Report	
2009	August 21	6	David Ragan	Roush Fenway Racing	Ford	254*	135.382 (217.876)	1:49:27	74.216	Report	
2010	August 20	18	Kyle Busch	Joe Gibbs Racing	Toyota	250	133.25 (214.445)	1:36:08	83.166	Report	
2011	August 26	18	Kyle Busch*	Joe Gibbs Racing	Toyota	250	133.25 (214.445)	1:25:46	93.218	Report	
2012	August 24	18	Joey Logano	Joe Gibbs Racing	Toyota	250	133.25 (214.445)	1:44:26	76.556	Report	
2013	August 23	54	Kyle Busch	Joe Gibbs Racing	Toyota	250	133.25 (214.445)	1:26:55	91.985	Report	
2014	August 22	22	Ryan Blaney	Team Penske	Ford	300	159.9 (257.334)	1:56:44	82.187	Report	
2015	August 21	54	Kyle Busch	Joe Gibbs Racing	Toyota	302*	160.966 (259.049)	1:51:57	86.27	Report	
2016	August 19	2	Austin Dillon	Richard Childress Racing	Chevrolet	308*	164.164 (264.196)	1:56:07	84.827	Report	
2017	August 18	18	Kyle Busch	Joe Gibbs Racing	Toyota	300	159.9 (257.334)	1:48:30	88.424	Report	
2018	August 17	42	Kyle Larson	Chip Ganassi Racing	Chevrolet	310*	165.23 (265.912)	2:00:27	82.306	Report	
2019	August 16	2	Tyler Reddick	Richard Childress Racing	Chevrolet	300	159.9 (257.334)	1:58:01	81.294	Report	
2020	September 18	98	Chase Briscoe	Stewart–Haas Racing	Ford	300	159.9 (257.334)	1:55:39	82.957	Report	
2021	September 17	16	A. J. Allmendinger	Kaulig Racing	Chevrolet	306*	163.098 (262.548)	2:10:26	75.026	Report	
2022	September 16	9	Noah Gragson	JR Motorsports	Chevrolet	300	159.9 (257.334)	1:58:27	80.996	Report	
2023	September 15	7	Justin Allgaier	JR Motorsports	Chevrolet	300	159.9 (257.334)	1:52:11	85.521	Report	
2024	September 20	00	Cole Custer	Stewart–Haas Racing	Ford	300	159.9 (257.334)	2:00:55	79.344	Report	
2025	September 12	19	Aric Almirola	Joe Gibbs Racing	Toyota	300	159.9 (257.334)	2:00:08	79.861	Report	
2026	September 18	00	Sheldon Creed	Haas Factory Team	Chevrolet	305*	162.565 (261.623)	1:53:07	86.229	Report	
2027	August 13									Report	

- 2004, 2005, 2009, 2015–16, 2018 2021 and 2026: Races extended due to NASCAR overtime.

==== Multiple winners (drivers) ====
# Wins	Driver	Years won
5	Kyle Busch	2010, 2011, 2013, 2015, 2017
2	Brett Bodine	1985, 1986
2	Larry Pearson	1987, 1988
2	Todd Bodine	1992, 1993
2	Jimmy Spencer	1997, 2002
2	Matt Kenseth	1999, 2006
2	Kevin Harvick	2000, 2001

==== Multiple winners (teams) ====
# Wins	Team	Years won
7	Joe Gibbs Racing	2010–2013, 2015, 2017, 2025
4	Richard Childress Racing	2000, 2001, 2016, 2019
3	JR Motorsports	2008, 2022, 2023
2	Thomas Brothers Racing	1983, 1986
2	David Pearson	1987, 1988
2	Team 34	1992, 1993
2	Roush Fenway Racing	2006, 2009
2	Team Penske	2005, 2014
2	Stewart–Haas Racing	2020, 2024

==== Manufacturer wins ====
# Wins	Make	Years won
21	(United States) Chevrolet	1987, 1988, 1993, 1995–2004, 2008, 2016, 2018, 2019, 2021–2023, 2026
7	(United States) Ford	1989, 1994, 2006, 2009, 2014, 2020, 2024
7	(Japan) Toyota	2010–2013, 2015, 2017, 2025
4	(United States) Pontiac	1982, 1984, 1985, 1991
2	(United States) Oldsmobile	1983, 1986
2	(United States) Buick	1990, 1992
2	(United States) Dodge	2005, 2007

Previous race: Sport Clips Haircuts VFW Help A Hero 200	NASCAR O'Reilly Auto Parts Series; Suburban Propane 300	Next race: NFPA 250

Previous race: United Rentals Driven to Serve 250	NASCAR O'Reilly Auto Parts Series; Food City 300	Next race: Nu Way 225
