= 2009 U.S. Cellular 250 =

Race details
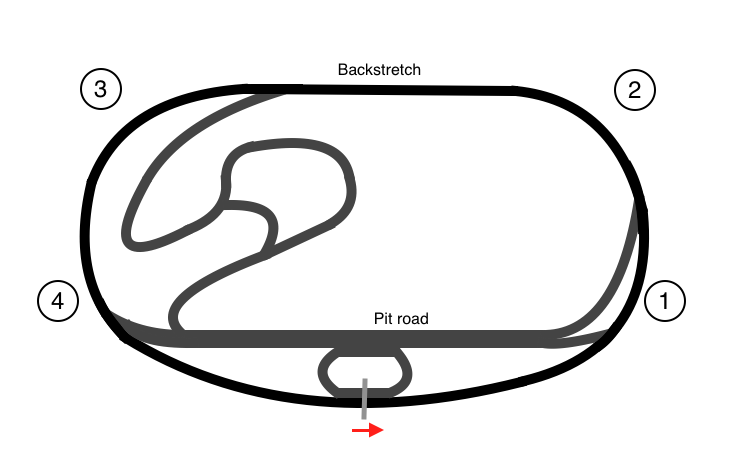
- Map of Speedway
- Date: August 1, 2009
- Official name: 2009 U.S. Cellular 250
- Location: Iowa Speedway in Newton, Iowa
- Course: D-Shaped oval
- Course length: 1.408 km (0.875 miles)
- Distance: 250 laps, 218.750 mi (352.044 km)
- Weather: Clear
- Average speed: 91.858 mph (147.831 km/h)
- Attendance: 56,087

Pole position
Driver	Ricky Stenhouse Jr.	Roush Fenway Racing
- Time: 23.310

Most laps led
Driver	Brad Keselowski	JR Motorsports
- Laps: 121

Winner
No. 88	Brad Keselowski	JR Motorsports

Television in the United States
- Network: ESPN
- Announcers: Marty Reid, Randy LaJoie, Rusty Wallace

The 2009 U.S. Cellular 250 was a NASCAR Nationwide Series race held at Iowa Speedway in Newton, Iowa on August 1, 2009. The race was the first ever Nationwide Series race to be held in Iowa. It was also the 21st race of the 2009 NASCAR Nationwide Series. Ricky Stenhouse Jr., making his 6th career Nationwide Series start, won the pole for the race but it was Brad Keselowski who would dominate the race, leading the most laps and winning the first ever race in Iowa.

== Background ==
Iowa Speedway is a 7/8-mile (1.4 km) paved oval motor racing track in Newton, Iowa, approximately 30 miles (48 km) east of Des Moines. It has over 25,000 permanent seats as well as a unique multi-tiered RV viewing area along the backstretch. The premiere event of the track is the Hy-Vee IndyCar Race Weekend held yearly in July since its inaugural running in 2007.

The track opened in September 2006 with the Soy Biodiesel 250, won by Woody Howard, for the USAR Hooters Pro Cup Four Champions playoff. The Indy Racing League announced a race there on June 24, 2007, the Iowa Corn Indy 250, which was won by Dario Franchitti, who barely nipped Marco Andretti at the finish line. The track also secured a combined NASCAR Camping World East-West race where results counted towards both series' championships. That race delivered a dramatic battle between 17-year-old Joey Logano from the Busch East Series, who defeated Daytona 500 champion Kevin Harvick, 1998 West Series champion, who represented the West Series at the end of the race. The track was awarded a NASCAR Camping World Truck Series race and a NASCAR Xfinity Series race in 2009.

=== Entry list ===
- (R) denotes rookie driver

#	Driver	Team	Make
0	Kertus Davis	JD Motorsports	Chevrolet
01	Danny O'Quinn Jr.	JD Motorsports	Chevrolet
1	Mike Bliss	Phoenix Racing	Chevrolet
2	Austin Dillon	Richard Childress Racing	Chevrolet
05	Casey Atwood	Day Enterprise Racing	Ford
5	Scott Wimmer	JR Motorsports	Chevrolet
6	Erik Darnell (R)	Roush Fenway Racing	Ford
07	Mike Harmon	SK Motorsports	Chevrolet
09	John Wes Townley (R)	RAB Racing	Ford
10	Kelly Bires	Braun Racing	Toyota
11	Scott Lagasse Jr. (R)	CJM Racing	Toyota
12	Justin Allgaier (R)	Penske Racing	Dodge
15	Michael Annett (R)	Germain Racing	Toyota
16	Ricky Stenhouse Jr.	Roush Fenway Racing	Ford
18	Jeremy Clements	Joe Gibbs Racing	Toyota
20	Brad Coleman	Joe Gibbs Racing	Toyota
23	Ken Butler III (R)	R3 Motorsports	Chevrolet
24	Eric McClure	Rensi-Hamilton Racing	Ford
26	Michael McDowell (R)	Whitney Motorsports	Dodge
27	Jason Keller	Baker Curb Racing	Ford
28	Kenny Wallace	Jay Robinson Racing	Chevrolet
29	Stephen Leicht	Richard Childress Racing	Chevrolet
32	Brian Ickler	Braun Racing	Toyota
33	Cale Gale	Kevin Harvick Inc.	Chevrolet
34	Kevin Hamlin	Front Row Motorsports	Chevrolet
38	Jason Leffler	Braun Racing	Toyota
40	Aric Almirola	Key Motorsports	Chevrolet
47	Coleman Pressley	JTG Daugherty Racing	Toyota
49	Mark Green	Jay Robinson Racing	Chevrolet
52	Jack Smith	Means Racing	Chevrolet
58	Chris Horn	Horn Auto Racing	Chevrolet
60	Auggie Vidovich	Roush Fenway Racing	Ford
61	Matt Carter	Specialty Racing	Ford
62	Brendan Gaughan (R)	Rusty Wallace Racing	Chevrolet
66	Steve Wallace	Rusty Wallace Racing	Chevrolet
70	Shelby Howard	ML Motorsports	Chevrolet
72	Benny Gordon	VSI Racing	Ford
73	Kevin Lepage	Derrike Cope Inc.	Dodge
75	Kenny Hendrick	Bob Schact Racing	Chevrolet
77	Peyton Sellers	Cardinal Motorsports	Chevrolet
78	Derrike Cope	Derrike Cope Inc.	Dodge
81	Sean Murphy	MacDonald Motorsports	Dodge
83	Johnny Borneman III	Borneman Motorsports	Ford
87	Jeff Fuller	NEMCO Motorsports	Chevrolet
88	Brad Keselowski	JR Motorsports	Chevrolet
89	Morgan Shepherd	Faith Motorsports	Chevrolet
90	Johnny Chapman	MSRP Motorsports	Chevrolet
91	Chase Miller	MSRP Motorsports	Chevrolet
96	Andy Ponstein	Whitney Motorsports	Dodge
99	Trevor Bayne	Michael Waltrip Racing	Toyota
Official Entry list

== Qualifying ==
Both Ricky Stenhouse Jr. and Justin Allgaier tied for the pole position with a time of 23.310 and a speed of 135.135 but Stenhouse got the tiebreaker and Stenhouse won his first career Nationwide Series pole in just his 6th start.

Grid	No.	Driver	Team	Manufacturer	Time	Speed
1	16	Ricky Stenhouse Jr.	Roush Fenway Racing	Ford	23.310	135.135
2	12	Justin Allgaier (R)	Penske Racing	Dodge	23.310	135.135
3	6	Erik Darnell (R)	Roush Fenway Racing	Ford	23.322	135.066
4	99	Trevor Bayne	Michael Waltrip Racing	Toyota	23.329	135.025
5	20	Brad Coleman	Joe Gibbs Racing	Toyota	23.384	134.707
6	29	Stephen Leicht	Richard Childress Racing	Chevrolet	23.400	134.615
7	5	Scott Wimmer	JR Motorsports	Chevrolet	23.410	134.558
8	66	Steve Wallace	Rusty Wallace Racing	Chevrolet	23.426	134.466
9	26	Michael McDowell (R)	Whitney Motorsports	Dodge	23.426	134.466
10	1	Mike Bliss	Phoenix Racing	Chevrolet	23.488	134.111
11	88	Brad Keselowski	JR Motorsports	Chevrolet	23.512	133.974
12	10	Kelly Bires	Braun Racing	Toyota	23.517	133.946
13	27	Jason Keller	Baker Curb Racing	Ford	23.518	133.940
14	90	Johnny Chapman	MSRP Motorsports	Chevrolet	23.520	133.929
15	38	Jason Leffler	Braun Racing	Toyota	23.539	133.820
16	2	Austin Dillon	Richard Childress Racing	Chevrolet	23.554	133.735
17	11	Scott Lagasse Jr. (R)	CJM Racing	Toyota	23.558	133.713
18	34	Tony Raines** ***	Front Row Motorsports	Chevrolet	23.559	133.707
19	49	Mark Green	Jay Robinson Racing	Chevrolet	23.563	133.684
20	83	Johnny Borneman III	Borneman Motorsports	Ford	23.563	133.684
21	62	Brendan Gaughan (R)	Rusty Wallace Racing	Chevrolet	23.577	133.605
22	05	Casey Atwood	Day Enterprise Racing	Ford	23.583	133.571
23	23	Ken Butler III (R)	R3 Motorsports	Chevrolet	23.613	133.401
24	28	Kenny Wallace	Jay Robinson Racing	Chevrolet	23.633	133.288
25	72	Benny Gordon	VSI Racing	Ford	23.641	133.243
26	47	Coleman Pressley***	JTG Daugherty Racing	Toyota	23.659	133.142
27	18	Kyle Busch** ***	Joe Gibbs Racing	Toyota	23.674	133.057
28	40	Aric Almirola	Key Motorsports	Chevrolet	23.677	133.041
29	32	Brian Ickler	Braun Racing	Toyota	23.683	133.007
30	09	John Wes Townley (R)	RAB Racing	Ford	23.731	132.738
31	0	Kertus Davis	JD Motorsports	Chevrolet	23.755	132.604
32	91	Chase Miller	MSRP Motorsports	Chevrolet	23.759	132.581
33	01	Danny O'Quinn Jr.	JD Motorsports	Chevrolet	23.768	132.531
34	33	Kevin Harvick** ***	Kevin Harvick Inc.	Chevrolet	23.770	132.520
35	73	Kevin Lepage	Derrike Cope Inc.	Dodge	23.774	132.498
36	15	Michael Annett (R)	Germain Racing	Toyota	23.821	132.236
37	61	Matt Carter	Specialty Racing	Ford	23.917	131.705
38	81	Sean Murphy	MacDonald Motorsports	Dodge	23.948	131.535
39	24	Eric McClure*	Rensi-Hamilton Racing	Ford	24.155	130.408
40	60	Carl Edwards* ** ***	Roush Fenway Racing	Ford	24.286	129.704
41	87	Jeff Fuller*	NEMCO Motorsports	Chevrolet	24.812	126.955
42	07	Mike Harmon* ***	SK Motorsports	Chevrolet	25.984	121.228
43	89	Morgan Shepherd	Faith Motorsports	Chevrolet	23.860	132.020
Failed to Qualify, withdrew, or driver changes
44	70	Shelby Howard	ML Motorsports	Chevrolet	23.885	131.882
45	77	Peyton Sellers	Cardinal Motorsports	Chevrolet	23.907	131.761
46	75	Kenny Hendrick	Bob Schacht Racing	Chevrolet	23.930	131.634
47	78	Derrike Cope	Derrike Cope Inc.	Dodge	24.066	130.890
48	96	Andy Ponstein	Whitney Motorsports	Dodge	24.140	130.489
49	52	Jack Smith	Means Racing	Chevrolet	24.190	130.219
50	58	Chris Horn	Horn Auto Racing	Chevrolet	24.363	129.294
DC	18	Jeremy Clements	Joe Gibbs Racing	Toyota	—	—
DC	33	Cale Gale	Kevin Harvick Inc.	Chevrolet	—	—
DC	34	Kevin Hamlin	Front Row Motorsports	Chevrolet	—	—
DC	60	Auggie Vidovich	Roush Fenway Racing	Ford	—	—
Official Starting grid

* – Made the field via owners points

** – There were 4 different driver changes by Raceday as there were drivers qualifying the cars for the Cup Series drivers. Jeremy Clements qualified for Kyle Busch, Cale Gale qualified for Kevin Harvick, Kevin Hamlin qualified for Tony Raines, and Auggie Vidovich qualified for Carl Edwards. This was during the peak of the Buschwhacker era where Cup Series drivers would drive in the Busch Series and would ask for other drivers to qualify their Busch Series car while they tried to qualify the Cup Series race which would be the Sunoco Red Cross Pennsylvania 500 at Pocono Raceway.

*** – Tony Raines, Coleman Pressley, Kyle Busch, Kevin Harvick, Carl Edwards, and Mike Harmon all had to start at the rear of the field. Harmon and Pressley had an unapproved impound adjustment while Busch, Harvick, Raines, and Edwards had driver changes.

== Race ==
Pole sitter Ricky Stenhouse Jr. led the first lap of the race. The first caution flew on lap 3 when John Wes Townley crashed off of turn 2 after his rear track bar broke. The race restarted on lap 8. On the restart, Justin Allgaier took the lead from Stenhouse. On lap 11, the second caution flew when Sean Murphy, making his Nationwide Series debut, crashed in turn 2. The race restarted on lap 16. On lap 39, the third caution flew when Casey Atwood crashed in turns 1 and 2. Brad Keselowski won the race off of pit road and led the field to the restart on lap 45. On lap 74, the 4th caution flew when Aric Almirola blew a front right tire and hit the outside wall in turn 3. Erik Darnell won the race off of pit road. Mike Bliss and Austin Dillon did not pit and Bliss led the field to a restart on lap 79. On lap 80, Kyle Busch took the lead. On lap 93, the 5th caution flew when Michael McDowell spun down the front-stretch after getting bumped by Tony Raines. The race restarted on lap 98. On lap 105, Brad Keselowski took the lead from Kyle Busch. On lap 108, Brendan Gaughan cut a tire off on turn 4 after he had contact with Brian Ickler. Gaughan went into turn 1 and spun where he collected Ken Butler III that caused Butler to spin while the wreck also collected Austin Dillon, Stephen Leicht, and Matt Carter, bringing the 6th caution of the race. The race restarted on lap 114.

=== Final laps ===
On lap 145, the 7th caution flew for debris in turn 1. Kyle Busch won the race off of pit road and led the field to the restart on lap 150. On lap 153, the 8th caution flew when Mike Bliss and Trevor Bayne crashed off of turn 4. The race restarted on lap 158. On lap 166, the 9th caution flew when Brad Coleman and Brian Ickler crashed in turn 2. The race restarted on lap 173. On lap 179, Brad Keselowski attempted to take the lead from Kyle Busch but failed to get in front of him. Keselowski tried again, on lap 186, and battled with Busch until lap 189, when Keselowski was able to get past him. On lap 211, the 10th caution flew when Austin Dillon cut a front left tire and hit the outside wall in turn 2. The race restarted on lap 219. On lap 224, Kyle Busch took the lead from Keselowski. On lap 229, the 11th caution flew when Morgan Shepherd spun down the front-stretch. The race restarted on lap 234. On the restart, the 12th and final caution flew when Justin Allgaier slid up into Erik Darnell and pinned Darnell and Steve Wallace into the outside wall down the back-stretch. The race restarted on lap 240. On lap 241, Brad Keselowski passed Kyle Busch for the lead. Busch tried to pass him in the closing laps but was unsuccessful. Keselowski took the first checkered flag at Iowa in Nationwide Series history and Busch finished in second. This would be Keselowski's 2nd win of the season and the 4th of his career since 2008. Jason Leffler, Carl Edwards, and Kelly Bires rounded out the top 5 while Jason Keller, Kenny Wallace, Michael McDowell, Scott Lagasse Jr, and Stephen Leicht rounded out the top 10.

== Race results ==
Pos	Car	Driver	Team	Manufacturer	Laps Run	Laps Led	Status	Points
1	88	Brad Keselowski	JR Motorsports	Chevrolet	250	121	running	195
2	18	Kyle Busch	Joe Gibbs Racing	Toyota	250	84	running	175
3	38	Jason Leffler	Braun Racing	Toyota	250	0	running	165
4	60	Carl Edwards	Roush Fenway Racing	Ford	250	0	running	160
5	10	Kelly Bires	Braun Racing	Toyota	250	0	running	155
6	27	Jason Keller	Baker Curb Racing	Ford	250	0	running	150
7	28	Kenny Wallace	Jay Robinson Racing	Chevrolet	250	0	running	146
8	26	Michael McDowell (R)	Whitney Motorsports	Dodge	250	0	running	142
9	11	Scott Lagasse Jr. (R)	CJM Racing	Toyota	250	0	running	138
10	29	Stephen Leicht	Richard Childress Racing	Chevrolet	250	0	running	134
11	15	Michael Annett (R)	Germain Racing	Toyota	250	0	running	130
12	72	Benny Gordon	VSI Racing	Ford	250	0	running	127
13	20	Brad Coleman	Joe Gibbs Racing	Toyota	250	0	running	124
14	1	Mike Bliss	Phoenix Racing	Chevrolet	250	3	running	126
15	12	Justin Allgaier (R)	Penske Racing	Dodge	250	35	running	123
16	83	Johnny Borneman III	Borneman Motorsports	Ford	250	0	running	115
17	66	Steve Wallace	Rusty Wallace Racing	Chevrolet	249	0	running	112
18	34	Tony Raines	Front Row Motorsports	Chevrolet	249	0	running	109
19	89	Morgan Shepherd	Faith Motorsports	Chevrolet	249	0	running	106
20	24	Eric McClure	Rensi-Hamilton Racing	Ford	249	0	running	103
21	61	Matt Carter	Specialty Racing	Ford	248	0	running	100
22	16	Ricky Stenhouse Jr.	Roush Fenway Racing	Ford	248	7	running	102
23	6	Erik Darnell (R)	Roush Fenway Racing	Ford	247	0	running	94
24	01	Danny O'Quinn Jr.	JD Motorsports	Chevrolet	245	0	running	91
25	62	Brandan Gaughan (R)	Rusty Wallace Racing	Chevrolet	244	0	running	88
26	99	Trevor Bayne	Michael Waltrip Racing	Toyota	244	0	running	85
27	81	Sean Murphy	MacDonald Motorsports	Dodge	222	0	running	82
28	2	Austin Dillon	Richard Childress Racing	Chevrolet	211	0	crash	79
29	09	John Wes Townley (R)	RAB Racing	Ford	205	0	running	76
30	33	Kevin Harvick	Kevin Harvick Inc.	Chevrolet	195	0	running	73
31	5	Scott Wimmer	JR Motorsports	Chevrolet	168	0	engine	70
32	32	Brian Ickler	Braun Racing	Toyota	165	0	crash	67
33	23	Ken Butler III (R)	R3 Motorsports	Chevrolet	108	0	crash	64
34	40	Aric Almirola	Key Motorsports	Chevrolet	74	0	crash	61
35	05	Casey Atwood	Day Enterprise Racing	Ford	37	0	crash	58
36	87	Jeff Fuller	NEMCO Motorsports	Chevrolet	31	0	overheating	55
37	0	Kertus Davis	JD Motorsports	Chevrolet	26	0	brakes	52
38	49	Mark Green	Jay Robinson Racing	Chevrolet	21	0	brakes	49
39	73	Kevin Lepage	Derrike Cope Inc.	Dodge	19	0	rear end	46
40	91	Chase Miller	MSRP Motorsports	Chevrolet	9	0	brakes	43
41	47	Coleman Pressley	JTG Daugherty Racing	Toyota	8	0	engine	40
42	90	Johnny Chapman	MSRP Motorsports	Chevrolet	7	0	overheating	37
43	07	Mike Harmon	SK Motorsports	Chevrolet	6	0	brakes	34
Official Race results

Previous race: 2009 Kroger 200	NASCAR Nationwide Series; 2009 season	Next race: 2009 Zippo 200 at the Glen
