= Roland Isaacs =

American racing driver (born 1957)

- Born: January 16, 1957 (age 69); La Grange, Kentucky, U.S.

NASCAR O'Reilly Auto Parts Series career
- 1 race run over 1 year
- 2004 position: 138th
- Best finish: 119th (2004)
- First race: 2004 Goulds Pumps/ITT Industries Salute to the Troops 250 (Pikes Peak)
Wins	Top tens	Poles
0	0	0

NASCAR FedEx Freight Truck Series career
- 11 races run over 3 years
- Best finish: 38th (2003)
- First race: 2001 Power Stroke Diesel 200 (IRP)
- Last race: 2005 O'Reilly 200 (Memphis)
Wins	Top tens	Poles
0	0	0
- Statistics up to date as of July 1, 2020.

Roland Isaacs (born January 16, 1957) is an American former professional stock car racing driver. He was a part-time fixture in the sport from 2001 to 2005, competing in the NASCAR Craftsman Truck Series, as well as one race in the Busch Series in 2004.

== Racing career ==
Isaacs' first stock car start came in the ARCA Permatex SuperCar Series race at Salem Speedway in 1988, where he finished 35th. He then made 3 NASCAR Southeast Series starts, one each in 1995, 1996, and 1997, and all of them at Louisville Motor Speedway. His best finish was fifth in 1996.

Isaacs made his Truck debut in 2001, with a one-race deal with Troxell Racing. He started the race at ORP in 30th position, but slid to 35th in the rundown after a rear end gear failed early in the event. Returning to the merged Troxell-MacDonald Racing team for the 2003 season, Isaacs ran nine races for the low-budget team. His best finish on the year ended up being a trio of 30ths at Memphis, Nashville and Phoenix. He would finish the year 38th in the points, his best career showing.

Isaacs also made one career NASCAR Busch Series start, which came in 2004. He drove a second MacDonald Motorsports Chevy, the No. 71, at Pikes Peak. Qualifying in the 29th position, Isaacs only completed 17 laps before starting and parking and would finish 37th.

Isaacs' last start in the Truck Series and NASCAR came in 2005 for Mighty Motorsports at Memphis. Isaacs started and finished in the 36th position, as electrical issues sidelined him early.

== Motorsports career results ==
=== NASCAR ===
(key) (Bold – Pole position awarded by qualifying time. Italics – Pole position earned by points standings or practice time. * – Most laps led.)

==== Busch Series ====
NASCAR Busch Series results
Year	Team	No.	Make	1	2	3	4	5	6	7	8	9	10	11	12	13	14	15	16	17	18	19	20	21	22	23	24	25	26	27	28	29	30	31	32	33	34	NBSC	Pts	Ref
2004	MacDonald Motorsports	71	Chevy	DAY	CAR	LVS	DAR	BRI	TEX	NSH	TAL	CAL	GTY	RCH	NZH	CLT	DOV	NSH	KEN	MLW	DAY	CHI	NHA	PPR; 37	IRP; DNQ	MCH	BRI	CAL	RCH	DOV	KAN	CLT	MEM	ATL	PHO	DAR	HOM	138th	52	

==== Craftsman Truck Series ====
NASCAR Craftsman Truck Series results
Year	Team	No.	Make	1	2	3	4	5	6	7	8	9	10	11	12	13	14	15	16	17	18	19	20	21	22	23	24	25	NCTS	Pts	Ref
2001	Troxell Racing	93	Chevy	DAY	HOM	MMR	MAR	GTY	DAR	PPR	DOV	TEX	MEM	MLW	KAN	KEN	NHA	IRP; 35	NSH	CIC	NZH	RCH	SBO	TEX	LVS	PHO	CAL		112th	58	
2003	Troxell-MacDonald Racing	93	Chevy	DAY	DAR	MMR	MAR	CLT	DOV	TEX	MEM; 30	MLW; 31	KAN	KEN	GTW	MCH	IRP	NSH; 30	BRI; 31	RCH; 34	NHA; 34	CAL	LVS	SBO; 35	TEX	MAR; 34	PHO; 30	HOM	38th	600	
2005	Mighty Motorsports	24	Chevy	DAY	CAL	ATL	MAR	GTW	MFD	CLT	DOV	TEX	MCH	MLW	KAN	KEN	MEM; 36	IRP	NSH; DNQ	BRI	RCH	NHA	LVS	MAR	ATL	TEX	PHO	HOM	93rd	55	

=== ARCA Permatex SuperCar Series ===
(key) (Bold – Pole position awarded by qualifying time. Italics – Pole position earned by points standings or practice time. * – Most laps led.)

ARCA Permatex SuperCar Series results
Year	Team	No.	Make	1	2	3	4	5	6	7	8	9	10	11	12	13	14	15	16	17	18	19	APSCSC	Pts	Ref
1988	Info not available	35	Chevy	DAY	ATL	TAL	FRS	PCS	ROC	POC	WIN	KIL	ACS	SLM	POC	TAL	DEL	FRS	ISF	DSF	SLM; 35	ATL			
