= Teri MacDonald =

Canadian racing driver (born 1963)

- Born: November 8, 1963 (age 63); Whitby, Ontario, Canada

NASCAR FedEx Freight Truck Series career
- 7 races run over 3 years
- Best finish: 55th (2002)
- First race: 2002 O'Reilly Auto Parts 200 (Memphis)
- Last race: 2004 O'Reilly 200 (Memphis)
Wins	Top tens	Poles
0	0	0

NASCAR Canada Series career
- 13 races run over 2 years
- Best finish: 14th (2001)
- First race: 2001 Mopar 250 (Delaware)
- Last race: 2002 Mopar Parts 250 (Delaware)
Wins	Top tens	Poles
0	2	0

Teri MacDonald-Cadieux (born November 8, 1963) is a Canadian stock car racing driver. Sister of NASCAR Winston Cup Series driver Randy MacDonald, she is currently retired from competition. She has competed in the past in NASCAR Craftsman Truck Series and CASCAR competition.

== Early career ==
Born in Whitby, Ontario on November 8, 1963. During the 1990s, MacDonald was a member of the PPG Pace Car Team, a group of professional drivers who drove the pace car at IndyCar events. She also drove in competition in sports cars, including the IMSA series. An accident at Road Atlanta in 1997 nearly ended her career; MacDonald suffered a broken neck, and she was forced to wear a halo to stabilise her head and neck.

Following her recovery, MacDonald returned to sports car racing; in 2000, she moved to stock cars, competing in the American Speed Association's National Tour before joining the CASCAR Super Series, Canada's top stock car series, for the 2001 season. She finished 14th in points, scoring two top 10 finishes over the course of the year.

== NASCAR ==
MacDonald made her debut in NASCAR's national touring series in 2002, in the Craftsman Truck Series at Memphis Motorsports Park. Randy MacDonald also competed in the race, making the siblings the first brother-sister combination to compete against each other in a top-level NASCAR race since Tim Flock and Ethel Flock Mobley in 1949.

MacDonald ran in three other races during the 2002 season; her best finish was 29th at Memphis. In 2003, she ran for Rookie of the Year in the Craftsman Truck Series; however she would only compete in one event that year, at Darlington Raceway, finishing 30th.

MacDonald returned to the Truck Series for two races in 2004; at Mansfield Motorsports Speedway, MacDonald, Tina Gordon and Kelly Sutton competed in the UAW/GM Ohio 250, the first time three female drivers raced in the same NASCAR event. She finished 25th in the event, her best finish of the year; a 32nd-place finish at Memphis was her final NASCAR event.

== Personal life ==
MacDonald currently works as a Christian inspirational speaker. She is married to Charles Cadieux; they have one son.

== Motorsports career results ==
=== NASCAR ===
(key) (Bold – Pole position awarded by qualifying time. Italics – Pole position earned by points standings or practice time. * – Most laps led.)

==== Craftsman Truck Series ====
NASCAR Craftsman Truck Series results
Year	Team	No.	Make	1	2	3	4	5	6	7	8	9	10	11	12	13	14	15	16	17	18	19	20	21	22	23	24	25	NCTC	Pts	Ref
2002	MacDonald Motorsports	72	Chevy	DAY	DAR	MAR	GTY	PPR	DOV	TEX	MEM; 29	MLW	KAN	KEN											HOM; 34				55th	277	
2002	Troxell Racing	93	Chevy												NHA; 26	MCH	IRP; 36	NSH	RCH	TEX	SBO	LVS	CAL	PHO					55th	277	
2003	Troxell Racing	93	Chevy	DAY	DAR; 30	MMR	MAR	CLT	DOV	TEX	MEM	MLW	KAN	KEN	GTW	MCH	IRP	NSH	BRI	RCH	NHA	CAL	LVS	SBO	TEX	MAR	PHO	HOM	119th	73	
2004	MacDonald Motorsports	72	Chevy	DAY	ATL	MAR	MFD; 25	CLT	DOV	TEX	MEM; 32	MLW	KAN	KEN	GTW	MCH	IRP	NSH	BRI	RCH	NHA	LVS	CAL	TEX	MAR	PHO	DAR	HOM	72nd	155	
