= Lafferty Motorsports =

Former NASCAR team

- Owner(s): Chris Lafferty; Calvin Wood
- Base: Concord, North Carolina
- Series: Camping World Truck Series ARCA Racing Series
- Race drivers: Chris Lafferty; Mike Harmon
- Manufacturer: Ford

Career
- Debut: 2008 AAA Insurance 200
- Races competed: 31
- Drivers' Championships: 0
- Race victories: 0
- Pole positions: 0

Lafferty Motorsports was an American auto racing team based in Concord, North Carolina. It was owned by driver and crew chief Chris Lafferty along with his wife Tracy, and co-crew chief Calvin Wood. Lafferty Motorsports fielded the No. 89 Ford F-150 in the NASCAR Camping World Truck Series for Lafferty and Mike Harmon. The team also ran a driver development service in the ARCA RE/MAX Series and other late model racing series, as well as built its own engines. Lafferty Motorsports has not fielded a truck since the 2011 season. In November 2011, Chris Lafferty was signed by Fox Sports Network to host the show "Chris Lafferty's Motorsports Show" with airing starting in January 2012. In July 2015, team owner and driver Chris Lafferty announced his team's return to competition, beginning in Bristol in August, though this never occurred.

== Truck No. 24 results ==
Year	Driver	No.	Make	1	2	3	4	5	6	7	8	9	10	11	12	13	14	15	16	17	18	19	20	21	22	23	24	25	NCWTC	Pts
2010	Mike Harmon	24	Ford	DAY	ATL	MAR	NSH	KAN	DOV; 34	CLT	TEX	MCH	IOW; 35	GTY	IRP; 34	POC	NSH; 31												60th	125
2010	Chris Lafferty	24	Chevy															DAR; 31	BRI	CHI	KEN	NHA; 33	LVS	MAR					60th	125
2010	Jerick Johnson	24	Chevy																						TAL; 35	TEX	PHO	HOM	60th	125

== Truck No. 89 results ==
Year	Driver	No.	Make	1	2	3	4	5	6	7	8	9	10	11	12	13	14	15	16	17	18	19	20	21	22	23	24	25	NCWTC	Pts
2004	Greg Pope	89	Chevy	DAY	ATL	MAR	MFD	CLT	DOV	TEX	MEM	MLW	KAN	KEN	GTW	MCH	IRP; DNQ	NSH	BRI	RCH	NHA	LVS	CAL	TEX	MAR	PHO	DAR	HOM	81st	31
2005	Tom Powers	89	Chevy	DAY	CAL	ATL	MAR	GTY	MFD	CLT	DOV	TEX	MCH	MLW; DNQ	KAN	KEN	MEM	IRP	NSH	BRI	RCH	NHA	LVS	MAR	ATL	TEX	PHO	HOM	N/A	-
2006	Norm Benning	89	Chevy	DAY; DNQ	CAL	ATL	MAR	GTY	CLT	MFD	DOV	TEX	MCH	MLW	KAN	KEN	MEM												43rd	193
2006	Chuck Maitlen	89	Chevy															IRP; DNQ	NSH	BRI; DNQ									43rd	193
2006	Garrett Liberty	89	Chevy																		NHA; DNQ	LVS	TAL	MAR	ATL	TEX	PHO	HOM	43rd	193
2008	Ryan Seaman	89	Chevy	DAY	CAL	ATL	MAR	KAN	CLT	MFD	DOV; 33	TEX	MCH	MLW; 35															42nd	308
2008	Nick Tucker	89	Chevy												MEM; 34	KEN	IRP	NSH	BRI	GTW	NHA	LVS							42nd	308
2008	Richard Johns	89	Chevy																				TAL; 31		ATL; 30				42nd	308
2008	Russ Dugger	89	Chevy																					MAR; DNQ			PHO; 32		42nd	308
2008	Mike Harmon	89	Chevy																							TEX; 34		HOM; DNQ	42nd	308
2009	Marc Mitchell	89	Chevy	DAY; DNQ																									54th	220
2009	Mike Harmon	89	Chevy		CAL; DNQ	ATL							MLW; 26																54th	220
2009	Dillon Oliver	89	Chevy				MAR; 30	KAN	CLT	DOV																			54th	220
2009	Nick Tucker	89	Chevy								TEX; 30	MCH																	54th	220
2009	Wes Burton	89	Chevy											MEM; 29	KEN		NSH; 25	BRI	CHI	IOW	GTW	NHA							54th	220
2009	Jason Cochran	89	Chevy													IRP; 30													54th	220
2009	Trevor Boys	89	Chevy																				LVS; 35						54th	220
2009	Chris Lafferty	89	Chevy																					MAR; DNQ	TAL	TEX	PHO; 35	HOM	54th	220
2010	Wayne Edwards	89	Chevy	DAY; DNQ																									30th	1537
2010	Mike Harmon	89	Ford		ATL; 36		NSH; DNQ	KAN; 33		CLT; DNQ	TEX; 35	MCH; 34		GTY; 33		POC; 26		DAR; 15	BRI; DNQ	CHI; 34	KEN; DNQ	NHA; 25			TAL; 29			HOM; DNQ	30th	1537
2010	Chris Lafferty	89	Chevy			MAR; 33			DOV; 36				IOW; DNQ		IRP; 30		NSH; 30							MAR; DNQ			PHO; 35		30th	1537
2010	Chris Lafferty	89	Dodge																				LVS; DNQ			TEX; DNQ			30th	1537
2011	Chris Lafferty	89	Chevy	DAY	PHO	DAR; DNQ	MAR	NSH	DOV	CLT	KAN	TEX	KEN	IOW			POC; 31	MCH; 26	BRI	ATL	CHI	NHA	KEN	LVS	TAL	MAR	TEX	HOM	75th	0
2011	Chris Lafferty	89	Dodge												NSH; 31	IRP; Wth													75th	0
