= Mike Harmon (racing driver) =

American racing driver (born 1958)

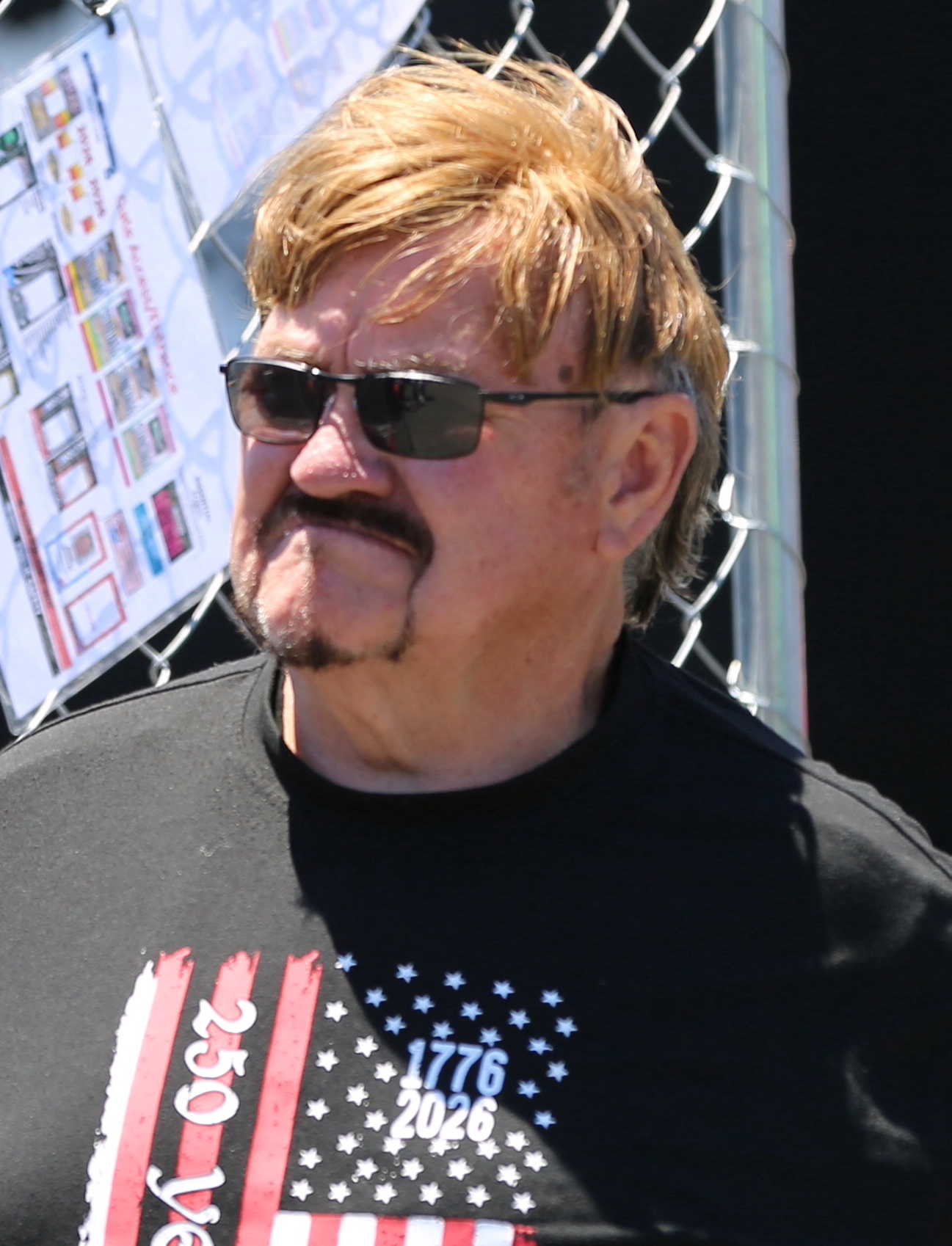
- Harmon at Sonoma Raceway in 2026
- Born: Michael Joseph Harmon; January 24, 1958 (age 68); Birmingport, Alabama, U.S.
- Achievements: 1990 Southern All Star Super Late Model Series Champion (inaugural season)

NASCAR O'Reilly Auto Parts Series career
- 290 races run over 21 years
- 2022 position: 106th
- Best finish: 23rd (2003)
- First race: 1996 Winston Motorsports 300 (South Boston)
- Last race: 2022 Sparks 300 (Talladega)
Wins	Top tens	Poles
0	0	0

NASCAR FedEx Freight Truck Series career
- 66 races run over 17 years
- 2018 position: 104th
- Best finish: 34th (2010)
- First race: 2001 MBNA E-Commerce 200 (Dover)
- Last race: 2018 JAG Metals 350 (Texas)
Wins	Top tens	Poles
0	0	0
- Statistics up to date as of December 27, 2022.

Michael Joseph Harmon (born January 24, 1958) is an American professional stock car racing driver, crew chief, and team owner. He owns Mike Harmon Racing which currently fields the No. 74 Chevrolet Camaro part-time in the NASCAR Xfinity Series. As a driver, he most recently competed in 2023. In the past, he drove in the NASCAR Slim Jim All Pro Series, finishing eighth in points in 1997.

== NASCAR career ==
Harmon made his NASCAR debut in 1996 driving the No. 24 Chevrolet at South Boston Speedway, where he finished 31st after a transmission failure. He ran seven more races in the car that season, with a best finish of 23rd, but a sponsorship struggle caused his team to close down. He was scheduled to return to NASCAR in 1999, when he signed with Donlavey Racing to compete for NASCAR Winston Cup Rookie of the Year honors. Harmon was reportedly fired from the team during preparation for that year's Daytona 500 when he refused to let another driver try to get more speed out of the car.

In 2001, Harmon returned to the Busch Series, driving fourteen races for Mixon Motorsports in the No. 44 Pontiac Grand Prix. His best finish was a 28th at Indianapolis Raceway Park, the only race he finished that year. He made an additional start for Moy Racing at Talladega Superspeedway, finishing 35th, and competed in two Craftsman Truck races for MB Motorsports and Troxell Racing, respectively. He made 25 starts for Mixon in 2002, with a best finish of 22nd at Daytona. The following season, he competed in a career-high total of 32 races and finished seventeen of them. With a new team partner in Global Industrial Contractors, Harmon had his first career top-twenty finish at IRP and finished 23rd in points.

GIC-Mixon switched to the No. 24 in 2004 and after the Aaron's 312, Harmon was released from the team and replaced by Shane Hmiel. He made two more starts that season, his best finish being 33rd at Memphis Motorsports Park for Oostlander Racing. In 2005, Harmon and Oostlander purchased part of the assets of Innovative Motorsports and ran the first four races of the season in the No. 21 Chevrolet Silverado, before focusing mainly on ARCA racing. Harmon attempted a Busch Series race later in the year at Memphis for Bobby Norfleet, but did not qualify.

Harmon returned to NASCAR in 2007, driving the No. 44/No. 48 car for Richardson-Netzloff Racing in the Busch Series. He made seven races with a best finish of 38th before handing the ride off to Jennifer Jo Cobb late in the season. He attempted a larger part-time season in the No. 84 Chevrolet fielded by the new Elite 2 Racing team in 2008, for eighteen races. Harmon posted his best finish in the Nationwide Series to date, finishing seventeenth at the Aaron's 312.

In 2009, Harmon started racing in his own No. 84 car and then took over the No. 07 Chevrolet for SK Motorsports. He would also start and park in his own No. 24 in four Camping World Truck Series races. For 2010, Harmon has run part-time in the Truck Series for both Lafferty Motorsports and Daisy Ramirez Motorsports.

Harmon drove his own No. 74 Chevrolet in the 2011 season, running approximately half the season's races; he also competed in several Truck Series races later in the year. He returned to the Nationwide Series in the No. 74 in 2012 and 2013.

In the 2020 Xfinity season opener at Daytona, Harmon scored a career high finish of sixteenth.

=== 2002 Bristol crash ===
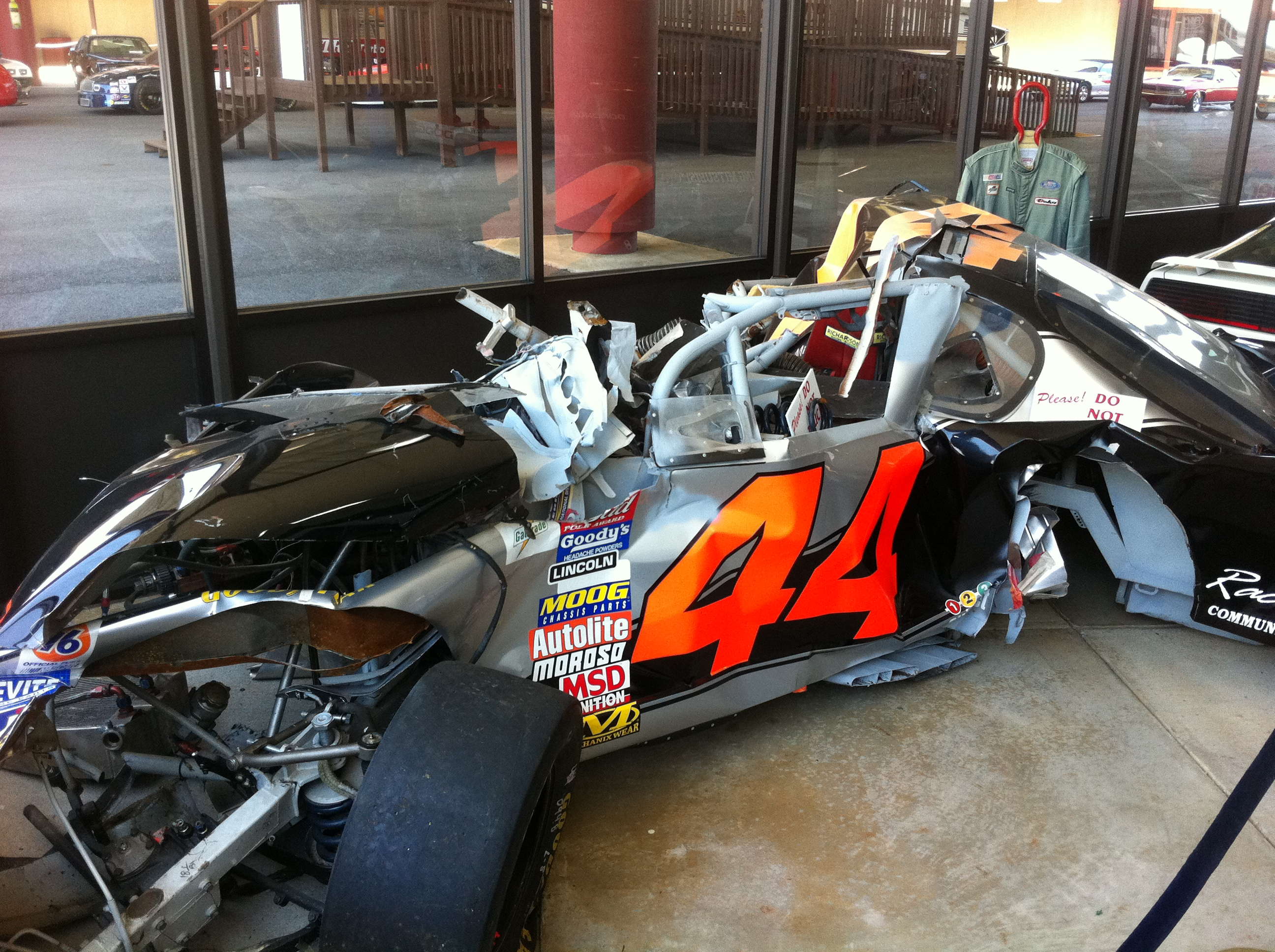
Harmon's Bristol car on display at the International Motorsports Hall of Fame.

Harmon is also famous for an incident at Bristol Motor Speedway in August 2002. Harmon was practicing his No. 44 car, when he crashed into the track's infield entry gate in Turn 2. The gate was improperly secured when Harmon's car crashed into it causing it to swing open. His car then impacted the end of the concrete wall head-on. The impact was so violent, the car was nearly split in half. The remnants of the vehicle were then struck by the car of Johnny Sauter, fortunately hitting the half that Harmon was not sitting in. Harmon walked away from the crash unharmed.

== Mike Harmon Racing ==
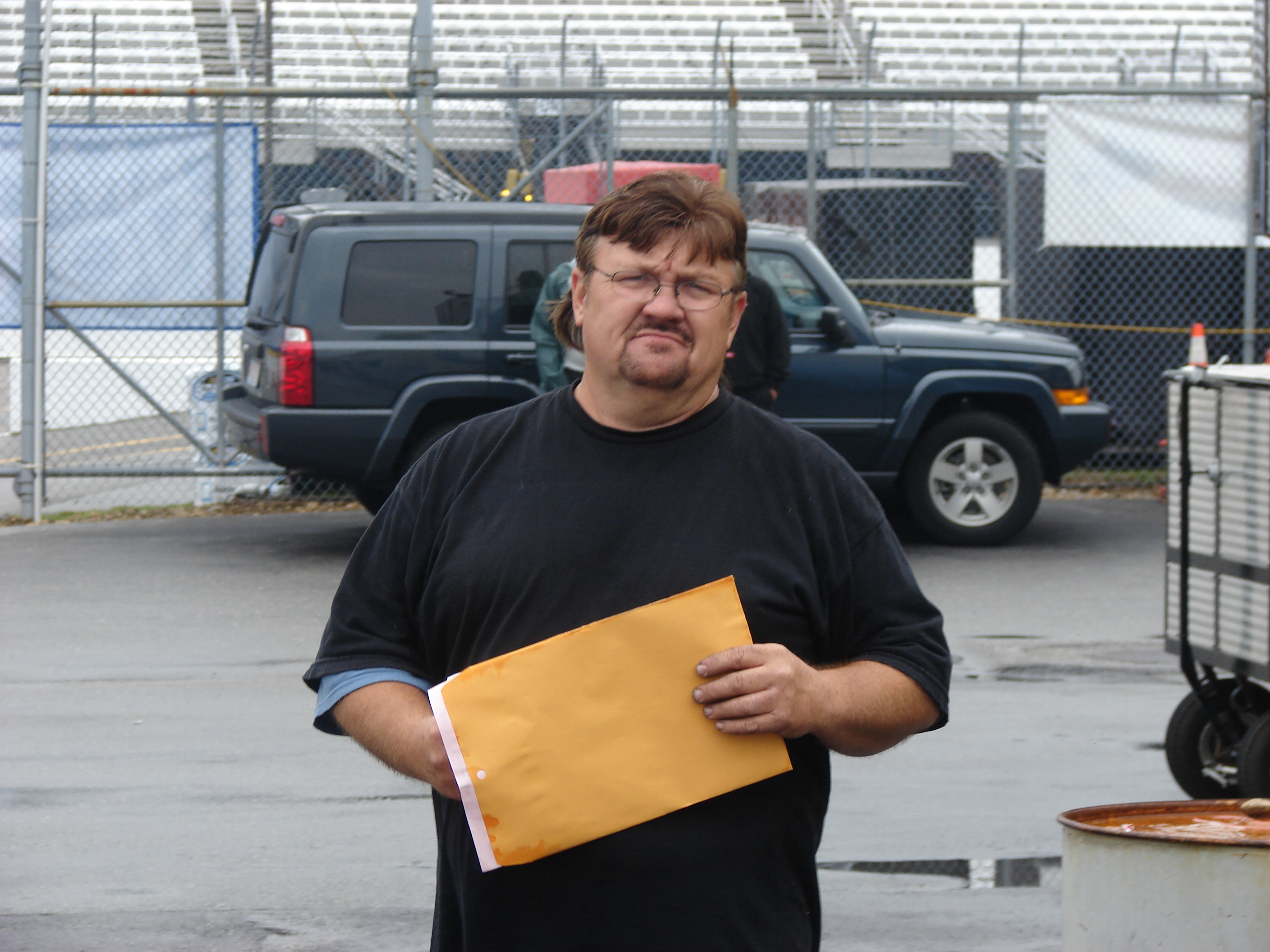
Harmon in 2008

For the last several years, Harmon has primarily competed in NASCAR driving his self owned 74 car in the Xfinity Series, as well as part-time in the 74 truck for his own team, with additional drivers filling out the schedule. Harmon was of only two teams that still fielded a Dodge Challenger after they left NASCAR in 2012 until the O'Reilly Series switched to composite bodies in 2018 and one of the few remaining owner/drivers. Harmon's team usually relies on week to week sponsorships to help keep his team open. In 2017, the team partnered with Veterans Motorsports Inc., a company that provides jobs for veterans; in accordance with the deal, MHR allowed veterans to work for the team.

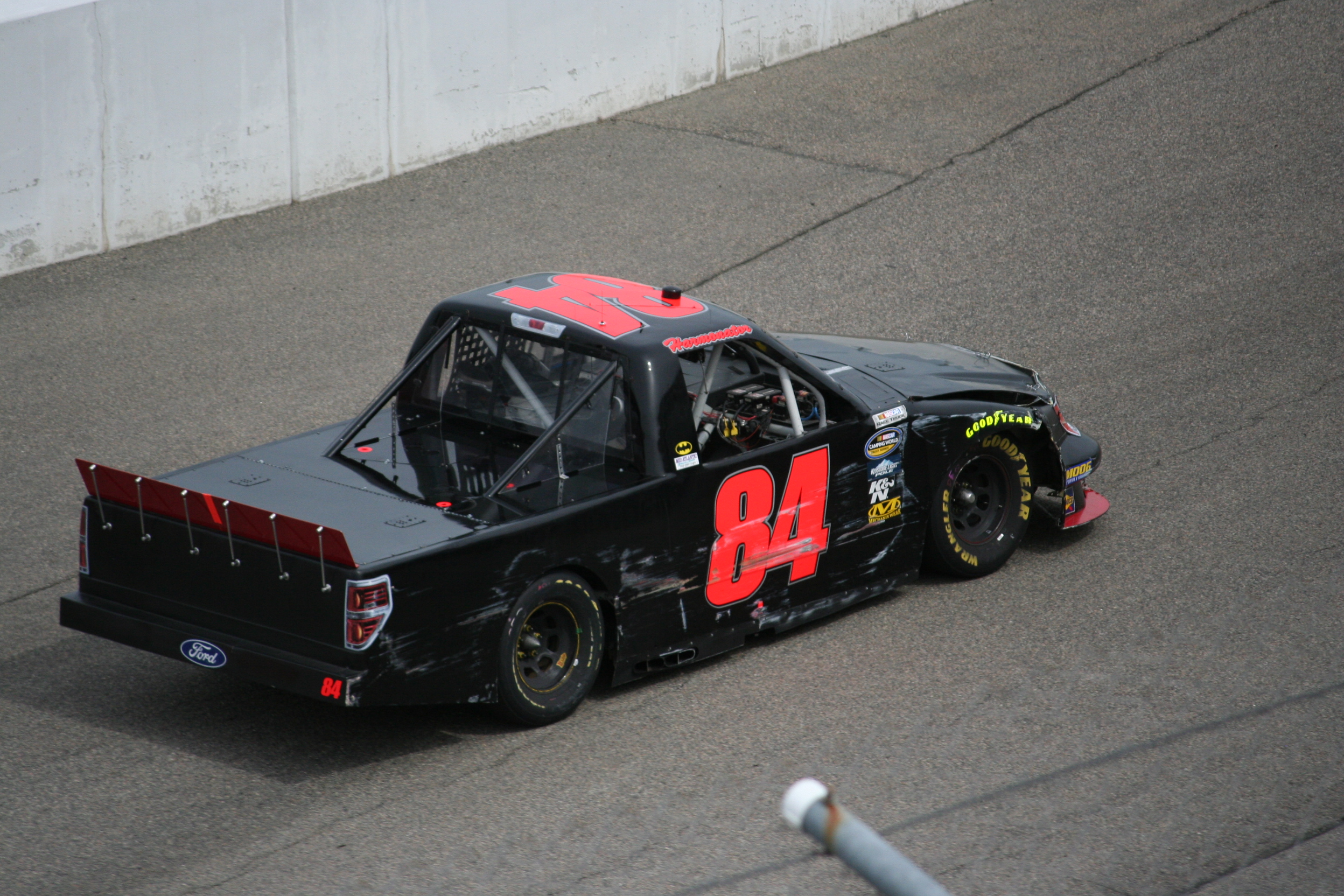
Harmon at Rockingham Speedway in 2013

The team also fields vehicles in the Truck Series, with the ride being filled primarily by Jordan Anderson. Anderson left the team after the 2015 season. Harmon attempted several races in early 2016, but failed to qualify. Tim Viens failed to qualify at Atlanta and he made the race at New Hampshire. Viens also withdrew at Las Vegas. Paige Decker ran at Martinsville. Jordan Anderson returned to the team at the penultimate race at Phoenix. Harmon formed partnerships with teams last year to get his truck on track. Faith Motorsports partnered with Harmon at Iowa but failed to qualify with Donnie Levister. They also attempted to run Bristol with Levister, but the team withdrew. Harmon partnered with Brandonbilt Motorsports at Texas (spring) with Viens driving. Harmon also partnered with Bolen Motorsports at Las Vegas, also with Viens driving. The team returned in 2017 at Daytona with Anderson, who failed to qualify.

In 2019, MHR partnered with Rick Ware Racing to field the No. 17. The following year, the team expanded to include a No. 47 car in addition to the primary No. 74.

In 2020, Harmon only ran the plate races in the No. 74 to make way for other drivers to drive his car. Joe Nemechek, Bayley Currey and Kyle Weatherman all drove races in the 2 cars. In the end, Currey went full-time in the 74 and Weatherman went full-time in the 47. The same lineup remained for 2021.

In 2021 at Phoenix Raceway, Currey got his & the teams best finish, finishing seventh.

=== NASCAR Xfinity Series ===
==== Car No. 74 History ====
In 2011, Harmon debuted the team and No. 74 at Auto Club Speedway, start and parking after three laps and finishing 43rd. The next race the No. 74 attempted was at Texas Motor Speedway with J. J. Yeley behind the wheel, who parked the car after five laps. That season, Harmon ran 14 races and Yeley ran two, all of them being start and parks.

In 2012, Harmon remained to start and park the car, with Kevin Lepage, Rick Crawford, David Green and Scott Riggs being brought in for one race apiece.

During 2013, Harmon began to bring in many new drivers. That season, Harmon himself only drove seven races, with Kevin Lepage, Juan Carlos Blum, Danny Efland, Carl Long and Kevin O'Connell running races. Notably, the team did not start and park in most races they entered that year. O'Connell scored the team their best non-superspeedway finish up to then, a 22nd-place finish at Road America while staying on the lead lap. Harmon also scored their best finish up to then at Daytona, finishing seventeenth on the lead lap.

Harmon ran most races in 2014, and they start and parked most times. Kevin Lepage, Mike Wallace, Reuse brothers Bobby and Roger also had seat time. The team's best finish that year was a 24th-place finish at Mid-Ohio with Bobby Reuse, six laps down.

For 2015, Harmon attempted 29 races in the 74, start and parking in twelve races and failing to qualify in two of them, Talladega and Charlotte. The Reuse brothers returned, with Bobby driving at Watkins Glen and Roger driving at Road America. Jordan Anderson drove at Bristol, and Tim Viens drove in the finale race at Homestead-Miami. Harmon scored the team's best finish at Daytona, a 24th-place finish after starting nineteenth, seven laps down.

In 2016 the team would qualify for 25 races in 29 attempts - Harmon attempted 26, Nicolas Hammann attempted (and made) 2, with Roger Reuse returning for Mid-Ohio. The 74 car's best finish was 24th in the VisitMyrtleBeach.com 300 with Harmon behind the wheel.

In 2017 the 74 attempted 27 races - 23 with Harmon, two with Cody Ware, and two with John Graham. The 74 qualified for 22 of the attempted races, with a best finish of 23rd in two races - the Coca-Cola Firecracker 250 with Harmon, and the Mid-Ohio Challenge with Ware.

For the 2018 season, the 74 attempted 32 races, and made 25. Harmon would attempt 25, but make nineteen. Stephen Leicht attempted three, making two. Ware, Ray Black Jr., and B. J. McLeod attempted and qualified for one race apiece. The 74 car's best finish was 21st at the Coca-Cola Firecracker 250, driven by Harmon.

In 2019, the 74 made 31 races. There was a more vast lineup of drivers this year, with Harmon making eighteen, Kyle Weatherman making three, Tyler Matthews making two, Camden Murphy making two, and veteran Joe Nemechek making two. The drivers who made one race in the 74 were - Dan Corcoran, Bayley Currey, Nicolas Hammann and Aaron Quine. The 74 scored two top-twenties that season - Hammann finishing fifteenth in the CTEH Manufacturing 180, and Currey finishing twentieth in the O'Reilly Auto Parts 300.

The 74 got a complete revamp in 2020, with Currey returning for 25 races (26 attempts). The rest of the 74's schedule was filled by Harmon for four races, Kyle Weatherman for two races and Gray Gaulding for one race. The 74 had a very impressive twelve top-twenties in 2020, with Currey scoring nine, a best finish of twelfth at O'Reilly Auto Parts 300. The remaining three were scored by Harmon, who ran the four Superspeedway races, with three top-twenties - a best of sixteenth at the NASCAR Racing Experience 300.

In 2021, the 74 team fielded eight drivers - Currey for seventeen races, C.J. McLaughlin for four, Gaulding for two, Dawson Cram for one, Jesse Iwuji for one, Tim Viens for one and Carson Ware for one. Currey scored the team's first ever top-ten at Phoenix Raceway, finishing seventh. However, past this impressive race, MHR struggled, as Currey failed to qualify for four races and moved to JD Motorsports at the end of the season. No other drivers scored a top-twenty finish. On November 22, 2021, NASCAR suspended crew chief Ryan Bell for the first six races in 2022 for violating Section 5.1.a.c.d: Vehicle testing when the team brought the No. 74 car to Rockingham Speedway (which is currently unsanctioned by NASCAR) for a charity event. In addition, the team would have 75 owner and driver points deducted at the start of the 2022 season.

== Legal issues ==
On May 15, 2013, Harmon was arrested and charged with stealing a hauler and racing equipment belonging to fellow competitor Jennifer Jo Cobb, in association with his sister and Cobb's former partner Dave Novak; Harmon stated that he was innocent. On May 28, officials from the Rowan County Sheriff's Office seized five Camping World Truck Series trucks and two Nationwide Series cars, which were stated as belonging to Cobb, from Harmon's garage. An arrest warrant was issued for Harmon in the case on June 16, 2013; Harmon turned himself in the following day and was released on a $10,000 bond pending trial. In October, Cobb requested that the charges be dropped, and they were shortly thereafter.

== Motorsports career results ==
=== NASCAR ===
(key) (Bold – Pole position awarded by qualifying time. Italics – Pole position earned by points standings or practice time. * – Most laps led.)

==== Winston Cup Series ====
NASCAR Winston Cup Series results
Year	Team	No.	Make	1	2	3	4	5	6	7	8	9	10	11	12	13	14	15	16	17	18	19	20	21	22	23	24	25	26	27	28	29	30	31	32	33	34	35	36	NWCC	Pts	Ref
2002	GIC Motorsports	93	Ford	DAY	CAR	LVS	ATL	DAR	BRI	TEX	MAR	TAL	CAL	RCH	CLT	DOV	POC	MCH	SON	DAY	CHI	NHA	POC	IND	GLN	MCH	BRI	DAR	RCH	NHA	DOV	KAN	TAL	CLT	MAR	ATL	CAR	PHO; Wth	HOM; DNQ	NA	-	
2003	BC Motorsports	78	Chevy	DAY; DNQ	CAR	LVS	ATL	DAR	BRI	TEX	TAL	MAR	CAL	RCH	CLT	DOV	POC	MCH	SON	DAY	CHI	NHA	POC	IND	GLN	MCH	BRI	DAR	RCH	NHA	DOV	TAL	KAN	CLT	MAR	ATL	PHO	CAR	HOM	NA	-	

===== Daytona 500 =====
Year	Team	Manufacturer	Start	Finish
2003	BC Motorsports	Chevrolet	DNQ	

==== Xfinity Series ====
NASCAR Xfinity Series results
Year	Team	No.	Make	1	2	3	4	5	6	7	8	9	10	11	12	13	14	15	16	17	18	19	20	21	22	23	24	25	26	27	28	29	30	31	32	33	34	35	NXSC	Pts	Ref
1996	Barney Walker Motorsports Inc.	24	Chevy	DAY; DNQ	CAR; DNQ	RCH; DNQ	ATL; DNQ	NSV; DNQ	DAR; DNQ	BRI; DNQ	HCY	NZH	CLT	DOV	SBO; 31	MYB; 23	GLN	MLW; 42	NHA	TAL; 40	IRP; 33	MCH; 32	BRI	DAR	RCH; 28	DOV	CLT	CAR	HOM										56th	454	
2001	GIC-Mixon Motorsports	44	Pontiac	DAY	CAR	LVS	ATL	DAR	BRI	TEX; DNQ	NSH; 40																												51st	660	
2001	PRW Racing	77	Ford									TAL; 35	CAL	RCH	NHA																								51st	660	
2001	GIC-Mixon Motorsports	44	Chevy													NZH; 38	CLT	DOV; 38	KEN; DNQ	MLW; 36	GLN	CHI; DNQ	GTY; 33	PPR; 40	IRP; 28	MCH; 41	BRI	DAR; 35	RCH	DOV; 42	KAN	CLT; 43	MEM; 40	PHO; 41	CAR; 38	HOM; DNQ			51st	660	
2002	GIC-Mixon Motorsports	44	Chevy	DAY; DNQ	CAR; 42	LVS; DNQ	DAR; 35	BRI; 42	TEX; DNQ	NSH; 41	TAL; 39	CAL; 28	RCH; 29	NHA; 34	NZH; 37	CLT	DOV; 35	NSH; 40	KEN; 40	MLW; 34	DAY; 22	CHI; 33	GTY; 42	PPR; 32	IRP; 41	MCH; DNQ	BRI; 43	DAR; 34	RCH; DNQ	DOV; 40	KAN; 41	CLT; DNQ	MEM; DNQ	ATL; 39	CAR; 36	PHO; 39	HOM; DNQ		38th	1321	
2003	GIC-Mixon Motorsports	44	Chevy	DAY; 23	CAR; 30	LVS; 43	DAR; 35	BRI; 40	TEX; 23	TAL; 34	NSH; 22	CAL; 39	RCH; 43	GTY; 30	NZH; 28	CLT; 41	DOV; 33	NSH; 38	KEN; 35	MLW; 33	DAY; 25	CHI; 22	NHA; 28	PPR; 22	IRP; 20	MCH; 31	BRI; 23	DAR; 27	RCH; 32	DOV; 33	KAN; 28	CLT; DNQ	MEM; 36	ATL; 30	PHO; 39	CAR; 37	HOM; DNQ		23rd	2207	
2004	GIC-Mixon Motorsports	24	Chevy	DAY; DNQ	CAR; 30	LVS; 39	DAR; 29	BRI; 41	TEX	NSH; DNQ	TAL; 35	CAL	GTY	RCH	NZH	CLT	DOV	NSH	KEN		DAY; DNQ	CHI	NHA																67th	406	
2004	Powell Motorsports	08	Chevy																	MLW; 38				PPR; DNQ	IRP	MCH	BRI	CAL	RCH	DOV	KAN	CLT							67th	406	
2004	Oostlander Racing	54	Pontiac																														MEM; 33	ATL	PHO; DNQ	DAR; DNQ	HOM		67th	406	
2005	Oostlander Racing	54	Pontiac	DAY	CAL	MXC	LVS	ATL	NSH; 43	BRI	TEX	PHO	TAL	DAR	RCH	CLT	DOV	NSH	KEN	MLW	DAY	CHI	NHA	PPR	GTY	IRP	GLN	MCH	BRI	CAL	RCH	DOV	KAN	CLT					145th	34	
2005	GIC-Mixon Motorsports	24	Chevy																																MEM; DNQ	TEX	PHO	HOM	145th	34	
2007	Mike Harmon Racing	48	Chevy	DAY	CAL	MXC	LVS	ATL	BRI	NSH; 40	TEX								KEN; 41																				88th	301	
2007	Mike Harmon Racing	44	Chevy									PHO; 41	TAL	RCH	DAR	CLT	DOV	NSH		MLW; 38	NHA; 38	DAY	CHI	GTY; DNQ	IRP; 43	CGV	GLN	MCH	BRI	CAL	RCH	DOV; 39	KAN	CLT	MEM; DNQ	TEX; DNQ	PHO	HOM	88th	301	
2008	Elite 2 Racing	84	Chevy	DAY; DNQ	CAL; 40	LVS; DNQ	ATL; 40	BRI; 40	NSH; 36	TEX; 43	PHO; 40	MXC	TAL; 17	RCH	DAR; 37	CLT	DOV; 43	NSH	KEN	MLW; DNQ	NHA; 42	DAY; 39	CHI	GTY	IRP	CGV	GLN	MCH	BRI; DNQ	CAL; DNQ	RCH	DOV	KAN; DNQ	CLT	MEM	TEX; DNQ	PHO	HOM	62nd	542	
2009	Mike Harmon Racing	84	Chevy	DAY; 29	CAL; DNQ	LVS; DNQ	BRI; DNQ	TEX; DNQ	NSH; DNQ	PHO; DNQ	TAL; DNQ	RCH; DNQ	DAR; 37	CLT; DNQ																									68th	612	
2009	SK Motorsports	07	Chevy												DOV; 26	NSH; 39	KEN; 33	MLW; 34	NHA		CHI; 33	GTY; 26	IRP	IOW; 43	GLN	MCH	BRI	CGV	ATL	RCH	DOV	KAN	CAL	CLT	MEM				68th	612	
2009	Xxxtreme Motorsports	58	Chevy																	DAY; 31																			68th	612	
2009	Mike Harmon Racing	84	Dodge																																	TEX; DNQ	PHO	HOM	68th	612	
2010	Cobb Racing Team	13	Dodge	DAY	CAL	LVS	BRI	NSH	PHO	TEX	TAL	RCH	DAR	DOV	CLT	NSH	KEN	ROA	NHA	DAY	CHI	GTY	IRP	IOW	GLN	MCH	BRI	CGV	ATL	RCH	DOV	KAN	CAL	CLT	GTY	TEX; DNQ	PHO	HOM	NA	-	
2011	Mike Harmon Racing	74	Chevy	DAY	PHO	LVS	BRI	CAL; 43	TEX	TAL; 40	NSH; 38	RCH; 37	DAR; 41	DOV; Wth	IOW; 37	CLT; 40	CHI; 39	MCH	ROA	DAY; 41	KEN; 40	NHA; 37	NSH; 38	IRP; 38	IOW; 36	GLN	CGV	BRI	ATL; DNQ	RCH	CHI	DOV	KAN	CLT	TEX	PHO	HOM		51st	71	
2012	Mike Harmon Racing	74	Chevy	DAY; DNQ	PHO; 39	LVS; 43	BRI	CAL; 40	TEX	RCH; 41	TAL; 38	DAR; 37	IOW; 35	CLT; 38	DOV; 34	MCH; 43	ROA	KEN	DAY; 38	NHA; 36	CHI; 39	IND; DNQ	IOW; 37	GLN	CGV	BRI	ATL; 39	RCH; DNQ	CHI; 39		DOV; DNQ	CLT	KAN; 41	TEX	PHO; 36	HOM			45th	106	
2012	Randy Hill Racing	08	Ford																											KEN; 36									45th	106	
2013	Harmon-Novak Racing	74	Dodge	DAY; 17							TAL; 32	DAR	CLT	DOV	IOW	MCH	ROA	KEN	DAY; 31							BRI; DNQ													44th	106	
2013	Harmon-Novak Racing	74	Chevy		PHO; 27	LVS; QL^{†}	BRI; 28	CAL; 31	TEX	RCH										NHA; DNQ	CHI	IND	IOW	GLN	MOH		ATL; 37	RCH	CHI	KEN	DOV	KAN	CLT	TEX	PHO	HOM			44th	106	
2014	Mike Harmon Racing	74	Dodge	DAY; 34					TEX; 29	DAR; 33	RCH; 33	TAL; 28	IOW; 38	CLT	DOV; 32	MCH; 28	ROA	KEN	DAY; 39	NHA			IOW; 39	GLN	MOH	BRI	ATL; 34	RCH	CHI; DNQ	KEN; 38	DOV; DNQ	KAN; 38	CLT; DNQ	TEX; DNQ	PHO	HOM			33rd	153	
2014	Mike Harmon Racing	74	Chevy		PHO; 31	LVS	BRI	CAL																															33rd	153	
2014	JGL Racing	93	Dodge																		CHI; 38	IND																	33rd	153	
2014	Mike Harmon Racing	87	Dodge																												DOV; 39								33rd	153	
2015	Mike Harmon Racing	74	Dodge	DAY; 24	ATL; 37	LVS; 31	PHO; 35	CAL; 35	TEX; 40	BRI; 35	RCH; 39	TAL; DNQ	IOW; 30	CLT; DNQ	DOV; 35	MCH; 32	CHI; 32	DAY; 33	KEN; 30	NHA; 31	IND; 33	IOW; 29	GLN				DAR; 34	RCH; 29	CHI; 34	KEN; 27	DOV; 25	CLT; 29	KAN; 38	TEX; 32	PHO; 31	HOM; RL^{‡}			25th	315	
2015	Mike Harmon Racing	74	Chevy																					MOH; 33	BRI	ROA													25th	315	
2016	Mike Harmon Racing	74	Dodge	DAY; DNQ	ATL; 30	LVS; 31	PHO; 38	CAL; 32	TEX; 33	BRI; 36	RCH; 36	TAL; DNQ	DOV; 32	CLT; 35	POC; 30	MCH; 29	IOW; 28	DAY; DNQ	KEN; 30	NHA; 30	IND; 35	IOW; 28	GLN	MOH	BRI; 36	ROA	DAR; 31	RCH; 38	CHI; 30	KEN; 24	DOV; 30	CLT; 38	KAN; 30	TEX; 32	PHO; 29	HOM; DNQ			27th	235	
2017	Mike Harmon Racing	74	Dodge	DAY; DNQ	ATL; DNQ	LVS; DNQ	PHO; 31	CAL; 34	TEX; DNQ	BRI; 30	RCH; 36	TAL; 25	CLT	DOV; 25	POC; 34	MCH; 32	IOW; 35	DAY; 23	KEN; 35	NHA; 31	IND; 34	IOW; 31	GLN	MOH	BRI; 35	ROA	DAR; 35	RCH; 33	CHI; 32	KEN; 34	DOV; 31	CLT; 32	KAN; DNQ	TEX; 32	PHO; 39	HOM			35th	115	
2018	Mike Harmon Racing	74	Dodge	DAY; DNQ							RCH; 36	TAL; 33	DOV; DNQ																			DOV; 35							38th	105	
2018	Mike Harmon Racing	74	Chevy		ATL; DNQ	LVS; 31	PHO; 35	CAL; 40	TEX; DNQ	BRI				CLT; DNQ	POC; 33	MCH	IOW; 38	CHI; DNQ	DAY; 21	KEN; 30	NHA; 31	IOW; 32	GLN	MOH	BRI	ROA	DAR; 27	IND; 26	LVS; 33	RCH; 35	CLT		KAN; 28	TEX; 28	PHO; 32	HOM			38th	105	
2019	Mike Harmon Racing	74	Chevy	DAY; 35	ATL; 33	LVS; 30	PHO; 25	CAL; 26	TEX; 29	BRI; 29	RCH; 31	TAL; 23	DOV; 33	CLT	POC; 28	MCH	IOW; 27	CHI	DAY; DNQ	KEN; 27	NHA	IOW; 34	GLN	MOH	BRI	ROA	DAR; 32	IND; 32	LVS	RCH	CLT	DOV; 34	KAN	TEX	PHO; 29	HOM			36th	129	
2020	Mike Harmon Racing	74	Chevy	DAY; 16	LVS	CAL	PHO	DAR	CLT	BRI	ATL	HOM	HOM	TAL; 25	POC	IND	KEN	KEN	TEX	KAN	ROA	DAY	DOV	DOV	DAY; 17	DAR	RCH	RCH	BRI	LVS	TAL; 17	CLT	KAN	TEX	MAR	PHO			45th	73	
2021	Mike Harmon Racing	74	Chevy	DAY	DAY	HOM	LVS	PHO	ATL	MAR	TAL	DAR	DOV	COA	CLT	MOH	TEX	NSH	POC	ROA	ATL	NHA	GLN	IND	MCH	DAY	DAR	RCH	BRI	LVS	TAL	CLT	TEX	KAN	MAR; 39	PHO			72nd	1	
2022	Mike Harmon Racing	47	Chevy	DAY	CAL	LVS	PHO	ATL	COA	RCH	MAR	TAL	DOV	DAR	TEX	CLT	PIR	NSH	ROA	ATL	NHA	POC	IND	MCH	GLN	DAY	DAR	KAN	BRI	TEX	TAL; 34	CLT	LVS	HOM	MAR	PHO			106th	0^{1}	
2023	CHK Racing	74	Chevy	DAY	CAL	LVS	PHO	ATL	COA	RCH	MAR	TAL; DNQ	DOV	DAR	CLT	PIR	SON	NSH	CSC	ATL	NHA	POC	ROA	MCH	IRC	GLN	DAY	DAR	KAN	BRI	TEX	ROV	LVS	HOM	MAR	PHO			N/A	0	
^{†} – Qualified for Kevin Lepage . ^{‡} – Relieved Tim Viens

==== Camping World Truck Series ====
NASCAR Camping World Truck Series results
Year	Team	No.	Make	1	2	3	4	5	6	7	8	9	10	11	12	13	14	15	16	17	18	19	20	21	22	23	24	25	NCWTC	Pts	Ref
2001	MB Motorsports	63	Chevy	DAY	HOM	MMR	MAR	GTY	DAR	PPR	DOV; 35	TEX	MEM																76th	165	
2001	Troxell Racing	93	Dodge											MLW; 34	KAN	KEN	NHA												76th	165	
2001	Green Light Racing	07	Chevy															IRP; DNQ	NSH	CIC	NZH	RCH	SBO	TEX	LVS	PHO	CAL		76th	165	
2002	Troxell Racing	93	Chevy	DAY	DAR; DNQ	MAR	GTY	PPR	DOV	TEX	MEM	MLW	KAN	KEN	NHA	MCH	IRP	NSH	RCH	TEX	SBO	LVS	CAL	PHO	HOM				NA	–	
2005	Oostlander Racing	21	Chevy	DAY; 18	CAL; 25	ATL; 30	MAR; 32	GTY	MFD	CLT; DNQ	DOV	TEX	MCH	MLW	KAN	KEN	MEM	IRP	NSH	BRI	RCH	NHA	LVS	MAR	ATL	TEX	PHO	HOM	54th	337	
2008	Lafferty Motorsports	89	Chevy	DAY	CAL	ATL	MAR	KAN	CLT	MFD	DOV	TEX	MCH	MLW	MEM	KEN	IRP	NSH	BRI	GTY	NHA	LVS	TAL	MAR	ATL	TEX; 34	PHO	HOM; DNQ	110th	61	
2009	Lafferty Motorsports	89	Chevy	DAY	CAL; DNQ	ATL	MAR	KAN	CLT	DOV	TEX	MCH	MLW; 26																112th	0	
2009	Mike Harmon Racing	42	Chevy											MEM; 33	KEN	IRP	NSH	BRI	CHI	IOW	GTY	NHA; 31	LVS; 25	MAR					112th	0	
2009	Mike Harmon Racing	42	Dodge																						TAL; DNQ	TEX	PHO		112th	0	
2009	Boys Will Be Boys Racing	05	Dodge																									HOM; DNQ	112th	0	
2010	Lafferty Motorsports	89	Ford	DAY	ATL; 36		NSH; DNQ	KAN; 33		CLT; DNQ	TEX; 35	MCH; 34		GTY; 33		POC; 26		DAR; 15	BRI; DNQ	CHI; 34	KEN; DNQ	NHA; 25	LVS	MAR	TAL; 29	TEX	PHO	HOM; DNQ	34th	846	
2010	Daisy Ramirez Motorsports	01	Ford			MAR; 35																							34th	846	
2010	Lafferty Motorsports	24	Ford						DOV; 34				IOW; 35		IRP; 34		NSH; 31												34th	846	
2011	Norm Benning Racing	75	Chevy	DAY	PHO	DAR	MAR	NSH	DOV	CLT	KAN	TEX	KEN	IOW	NSH; 33	IRP	POC												101st	0^{1}	
2011	Mike Harmon Racing	74	Ford															MCH; 32	BRI	ATL	CHI; 36	NHA; 33	KEN; 35	LVS					101st	0^{1}	
2011	Mike Harmon Racing	74	Chevy																						TAL; DNQ	MAR	TEX; 30	HOM; 33	101st	0^{1}	
2012	Mike Harmon Racing	74	Chevy	DAY	MAR	CAR	KAN	CLT	DOV; 34	TEX; 33	KEN	IOW	CHI; DNQ	POC	MCH; 28	BRI	ATL	IOW	KEN	LVS	TAL; 35	MAR	TEX	PHO	HOM; DNQ				97th	0^{1}	
2013	Mike Harmon Racing	84	Ford	DAY	MAR	CAR; 36																							104th	0^{1}	
2013	Mike Harmon Racing	84	Chevy				KAN; 33	CLT; 24	DOV; 32	TEX	KEN	IOW	ELD	POC; 25	MCH; 23	BRI; DNQ	MSP	IOW; 34	CHI; 31	LVS; 25	TAL; 22	MAR	TEX; 31	PHO; 34	HOM				104th	0^{1}	
2014	Mike Harmon Racing	74	Chevy	DAY	MAR	KAN	CLT	DOV	TEX	GTW	KEN	IOW	ELD	POC	MCH	BRI	MSP	CHI; 32	NHA	LVS	TAL; 36	MAR	TEX; 27	PHO	HOM				104th	0^{1}	
2015	Mike Harmon Racing	49	Chevy	DAY	ATL	MAR	KAN	CLT	DOV	TEX	GTW	IOW	KEN	ELD	POC	MCH	BRI	MSP	CHI	NHA	LVS	TAL	MAR	TEX; 30	PHO	HOM			106th	0^{1}	
2016	Mike Harmon Racing	74	Chevy	DAY; DNQ	ATL	MAR	KAN; DNQ	DOV	CLT	TEX	IOW	GTW	KEN; 29	ELD	POC	BRI	MCH	MSP	CHI	NHA	LVS	TAL	MAR	TEX; DNQ	PHO	HOM			107th	0^{1}	
2017	TJL Motorsports	1	Chevy	DAY	ATL; 27	MAR	KAN	CLT	DOV	TEX	GTW	IOW	KEN																89th	0^{1}	
2017	Beaver Motorsports	50	Chevy											ELD; 18	POC	MCH	BRI	MSP											89th	0^{1}	
2017	Mike Harmon Racing	74	Chevy																CHI; 27	NHA	LVS				PHO; 28	HOM			89th	0^{1}	
2017	Mike Harmon Racing	1	Chevy																			TAL; 20	MAR	TEX					89th	0^{1}	
2018	Mike Harmon Racing	74	Chevy	DAY	ATL	LVS; 22	MAR; DNQ	DOV; 24	KAN; 24	CLT; 29	TEX; DNQ	IOW	GTW	CHI; 32	KEN					MSP; 31	LVS	TAL	MAR						104th	0^{1}	
2018	Beaver Motorsports	50	Chevy													ELD; DNQ	POC	MCH	BRI										104th	0^{1}	
2018	Premium Motorsports	15	Chevy																					TEX; 22	PHO	HOM			104th	0^{1}	

=== ARCA Racing Series ===
(key) (Bold – Pole position awarded by qualifying time. Italics – Pole position earned by points standings or practice time. * – Most laps led.)

ARCA Racing Series results
Year	Team	No.	Make	1	2	3	4	5	6	7	8	9	10	11	12	13	14	15	16	17	18	19	20	21	22	23	24	25	ARSC	Pts	Ref
1998		28	Chevy	DAY	ATL	SLM	CLT	MEM	MCH	POC	SBS	TOL	PPR	POC	KIL	FRS	ISF	ATL	DSF	SLM	TEX	WIN	CLT	TAL; 39	ATL				NA	0	
1999	Brad Smith Motorsports	26	Chevy	DAY	ATL	SLM	AND	CLT	MCH	POC	TOL	SBS	BLN	POC	KIL	FRS	FLM	ISF	WIN	DSF	SLM	CLT	TAL; 24	ATL					124th	110	
2000	Robert Day	6	Chevy	DAY; 4	SLM; 31	AND; 7	CLT; DNQ	KIL; 26	FRS; 23	MCH; 29																			16th	2045	
2000	Robert Day	6	Pontiac								POC; 38																		16th	2045	
2000	Peterson Motorsports	6	Ford									TOL; 29	KEN; 37																16th	2045	
2000	Peterson Motorsports	6	Chevy											BLN; 21															16th	2045	
2000	Peterson Motorsports	6	Pontiac												POC; 29	WIN; 29	ISF	KEN; 32	DSF	SLM	CLT								16th	2045	
2000	Hylton Motorsports	48	Chevy																			TAL; 37							16th	2045	
2000	Hylton Motorsports	48	Ford																				ATL; 22						16th	2045	
2001	Jack Martin	18	Chevy	DAY; DNQ																									106th	235	
2001	Gerhart Racing	7	Ford		NSH; 10	WIN	SLM	GTY	KEN	CLT	KAN	MCH	POC	MEM	GLN	KEN	MCH	POC	NSH	ISF	CHI	DSF	SLM	TOL	BLN	CLT			106th	235	
2001	Gerhart Racing	7	Chevy																								TAL; 41	ATL	106th	235	
2002	Peterson Motorsports	6	Chevy	DAY; 28	ATL	NSH	SLM	KEN	CLT	KAN	POC	MCH	TOL	SBO	KEN	BLN	POC	NSH	ISF	WIN	DSF	CHI	SLM	TAL; 29	CLT				157th	90	
2003	GIC Motorsports	06	Ford	DAY	ATL	NSH; 40	SLM	TOL	KEN	CLT	BLN	KAN	MCH	LER	POC	POC	NSH	ISF	WIN	DSF	CHI	SLM	TAL	CLT	SBO				190th	30	
2004	Peterson Motorsports	6	Pontiac	DAY	NSH	SLM	KEN	TOL	CLT	KAN	POC	MCH; 17	SBO	BLN	KEN; 26	GTW	POC	LER	NSH; 34	ISF	TOL; 15	DSF	CHI	SLM					60th	490	
2004	Peterson Motorsports	6	Chevy																						TAL; DNQ				60th	490	
2005	Oostlander Racing	38	Chevy	DAY; 8			KEN; 15	TOL; 12	LAN; 9	MIL; 9	POC; 24	MCH; 25	KAN; 26	KEN; 26		POC; 9	GTW; 15	LER; 15	NSH; 11	MCH; 32		TOL; 28	DSF; 15	CHI; 18	SLM; 27	TAL; 16			8th	4315	
2005	Oostlander Racing	38	Pontiac		NSH; 34	SLM; 26									BLN; 25						ISF; 20								8th	4315	
2006	Oostlander Racing	38	Chevy	DAY; 31	NSH; 26	SLM; 16	WIN; 12	KEN; 33	TOL; 33	POC; 31	MCH; 34	KAN; 40	KEN; 35	BLN; 26	POC; 40	GTW; 29	NSH; 30	MCH; 31	ISF; 10	MIL; 31	TOL; 35	DSF; 13	CHI; 18	SLM; 31	TAL; 13	IOW; 39			15th	3335	
2007	Mike Harmon Racing	38	Chevy	DAY; 29	USA; 24	NSH; 27	SLM; 14	KAN; 24	WIN; 32	KEN; 18	TOL; 34	IOW; 17	POC; 16	MCH; 23	BLN; 20	KEN; 27	POC; 10	NSH; 24	ISF; 38	MIL; 31	GTW; 19	DSF; 26	CHI; 17	SLM; 19	TAL; DNQ	TOL; 17			14th	3790	
2008	Mike Harmon Racing	24	Chevy	DAY; 12	SLM; 21	IOW; 14	KAN; 28	CAR; 18	KEN; 36	TOL; DNQ	POC; 27	MCH; 34	CAY; 10	KEN	BLN; 18	POC; 19	NSH; 36	ISF; 22	DSF; 28	CHI; 33	SLM; 24	NJE; 35	TAL; 15	TOL; DNQ					20th	3040	
2009	Mike Harmon Racing	24	Chevy	DAY; 12	SLM	CAR	TAL; 36	KEN	TOL	POC	MCH	MFD	IOW	KEN	BLN	POC	ISF	CHI	TOL	DSF	NJE	SLM	KAN	CAR					98th	220	
2010	Peterson Motorsports	06	Ford	DAY	PBE	SLM	TEX	TAL	TOL	POC	MCH	IOW	MFD	POC; 34	BLN	NJE	ISF	CHI; 29	DSF	TOL	SLM	KAN; 33	CAR; 36						73rd	260	
2011	Peterson Motorsports	06	Chevy	DAY	TAL	SLM	TOL	NJE	CHI	POC	MCH	WIN	BLN	IOW	IRP; 35	POC	ISF	MAD	DSF	SLM	KAN	TOL							159th	55	
2012	Mike Harmon Racing	31	Ford	DAY; 32	MOB	SLM	TAL; 39	TOL	ELK	POC	MCH	WIN	NJE	IOW	CHI	IRP	POC	BLN	ISF	MAD	SLM	DSF	KAN						123rd	105	
2015	Peterson Motorsports	00	Chevy	DAY	MOB	NSH	SLM	TAL	TOL	NJE	POC	MCH	CHI; 29	WIN	IOW	IRP	POC	BLN	ISF	DSF	SLM	KEN	KAN						133rd	85	
