= Randy MacDonald =

Canadian racing driver (born 1962)

- Born: July 26, 1962 (age 64); Oshawa, Ontario, Canada
- Awards: 1993 ASA National Tour Rookie of the Year

NASCAR Cup Series career
- 5 races run over 3 years
- Best finish: 50th (1996)
- First race: 1994 AC-Delco 500 (Rockingham)
- Last race: 1997 Jiffy Lube 300 (Loudon)
Wins	Top tens	Poles
0	0	0

NASCAR O'Reilly Auto Parts Series career
- 32 races run over 14 years
- Best finish: 60th (1994)
- First race: 1986 Oxford 250 (Oxford)
- Last race: 2008 Kroger 200 (IRP)
Wins	Top tens	Poles
0	1	0

NASCAR FedEx Freight Truck Series career
- 94 races run over 10 years
- Best finish: 15th (2003)
- First race: 1996 Lowe's 250 (North Wilkesboro)
- Last race: 2007 Toyota Tundra Milwaukee 200 (Milwaukee)
Wins	Top tens	Poles
0	2	0

NASCAR Canada Series career
- 1 race run over 1 year
- Best finish: 38th (2007)
- First race: 2007 Subway 200 (Hamilton)
Wins	Top tens	Poles
0	1	0

Randy MacDonald (born July 26, 1962) is a Canadian stock car racing driver and a former competitor in the NASCAR Winston Cup Series, Busch Series and Craftsman Truck Series. He was the owner of MacDonald Motorsports, which competed in the Nationwide Series. He is the older brother of former NASCAR racer Teri MacDonald.

== Early career ==
Born in Oshawa, Ontario, MacDonald originally pursued a career in hockey, playing for the Bowmanville Eagles before changing his career path to stock car racing.

MacDonald began racing in his native Canada, and won the Canada ACT Series championship, before moving to North Carolina during the 1990s. He won the American Speed Association Rookie of the Year honors in 1993.

MacDonald made his NASCAR debut in 1986 at Oxford Plains Speedway, finishing 26th after his cooling fan expired. He ran one race apiece over the next few years, before posting his first career top-ten finish at the Goody's 300 in 1991. He ran two races apiece over the next two years in his own No. 01, his best finish being sixteenth at Daytona in 1993. After three finishes of 21st or better in 1994, he made his Winston Cup debut that year at North Carolina Speedway, finishing 24th in a car owned by Billy Hagan.

== Mid 1990s ==
MacDonald only ran one race the next year, finishing 23rd at Watkins Glen. In 1996, he declared for NASCAR Winston Cup Rookie of the Year honors, and ran three races for Triad Motorsports, his best finish a 24th at Pocono Raceway, but was unable to make a serious challenge for the top Rookie honor. He also made his Craftsman Truck Series debut that year, finishing thirtieth at North Wilkesboro Speedway for Mansion Motorsports.

In 1997, MacDonald debuted his Truck team at Homestead-Miami Speedway, finishing 25th after suffering mechanical failure. He ran ten races the next year for Dick Greenfield, MB Motorsports, and K Automotive Racing, posting an eighth place run for Greenfield at Flemington Speedway. He also made his most recent attempt at a Cup race, when he missed the field at Martinsville in the No. 85 sponsored by Big Daddy's BBQ Sauce. He began 1999 hoping to run full-time with Greenfield, but sponsorship opportunities did not come through, and he ran three races with Marty Walsh and Rick Ware.

== 2000s ==
In 2000, MacDonald got sponsorship on his truck from 3M and was able to make his first full-time schedule in NASCAR, posting a sixth-place run at Daytona and finishing 19th in points. Unfortunately, MacDonald injured his neck during the next season, and was forced to sit out most of the year. MacDonald returned in 2002, and split the year between his own team and Troxell Racing, finishing 19th in points. He followed that up with another full-time bid in 2003, posting eleven top-20 runs and finishing a career-best 15th in points. He also made his return to the Busch Series, running five races and having a best finish of 22nd at Daytona.

In 2004, MacDonald made his last Truck race to date, finishing 21st at Daytona. He ran six more Busch races that year, posting a best finish of 24th at Pikes Peak. He made one start in 2005, and three in 2006, running twice for his own team and other for Jay Robinson Racing. In 2007, he made two starts, exiting both races with handling problems.

== Team owner ==
In 2008, MacDonald switched from the driver's seat to the owner's box, running only two races himself. He fielded 26 races with D. J. Kennington, getting a best finish of 22nd. Other drivers behind the wheel of the No. 81 in 2008 were Brad Baker, Bryan Clauson, Kevin Hamlin, Bobby Hillin Jr., Shane Huffman, and P. J. Jones. In 2009, twelve different drivers drove the MacDonald Motorsports No. 81. The best result for the team was a thirteenth place result by Mike Bliss at Fontana. Michael McDowell became the main driver in 2010, starting 33 of 34 races for MacDonald and the team. Sponsors on the No. 81 included, Mobile-Shop, K-LOVE Radio, and Red Line Oil. MacDonald Motorsports No. 81 ended the year 31st in the owner's standings and McDowell was 21st in the driver's points. Blake Koch drove for the team in 2011; in 2012, American Majority joined as sponsor, with Jason Bowles driving the No. 81.

== Motorsports career results ==
=== NASCAR ===
(key) (Bold - Pole position awarded by time. Italics - Pole position earned by points standings. * – Most laps led.)

==== Winston Cup Series ====
NASCAR Winston Cup Series results
Year	Team	No.	Make	1	2	3	4	5	6	7	8	9	10	11	12	13	14	15	16	17	18	19	20	21	22	23	24	25	26	27	28	29	30	31	32	33	NWCC	Pts	Ref
1994	Hagan Racing	14	Chevy	DAY	CAR	RCH	ATL	DAR	BRI	NWS	MAR	TAL	SON	CLT	DOV	POC	MCH	DAY	NHA	POC	TAL	IND	GLN	MCH	BRI	DAR	RCH	DOV	MAR	NWS	CLT	CAR; 24	PHO	ATL			65th	91	
1995	Hagan Racing	14	Pontiac	DAY; DNQ	CAR	RCH	ATL	DAR	BRI											POC; DNQ	TAL	IND	GLN	MCH	BRI	DAR	RCH	DOV	MAR	NWS	CLT	CAR	PHO	ATL			N/A	0	
1995	Jimmy Means Racing	52	Ford							NWS; DNQ	MAR	TAL	SON	CLT	DOV	POC	MCH	DAY	NHA																		N/A	0	
1996	Triad Motorsports	78	Ford	DAY	CAR; DNQ	RCH; DNQ	ATL; DNQ	DAR; DNQ	BRI	NWS; DNQ	MAR; DNQ	TAL	SON	CLT; DNQ	DOV	POC; 24	MCH	DAY	NHA; 32	POC; 31	TAL	IND; DNQ	GLN	MCH	BRI	DAR; DNQ	RCH	DOV	MAR	NWS	CLT	CAR	PHO	ATL			50th	228	
1997	T.R.I.X. Racing	79	Chevy	DAY	CAR	RCH	ATL	DAR	TEX	BRI	MAR; DNQ	SON	TAL	CLT	DOV	POC	MCH	CAL	DAY	NHA; 41	POC	IND	GLN	MCH	BRI	DAR	RCH	NHA; DNQ	DOV	MAR	CLT	TAL	CAR	PHO	ATL		69th	40	
1998	Mansion Motorsports	85	Ford	DAY	CAR	LVS	ATL	DAR	BRI	TEX	MAR	TAL	CAL	CLT; DNQ	DOV	RCH	MCH	POC	SON	NHA										MAR; DNQ	CLT; DNQ	TAL	DAY	PHO	CAR	ATL	N/A	0	
1998	T.R.I.X. Racing	79	Chevy																		POC; DNQ																N/A	0	
1998	Sadler Brothers Racing	95	Chevy																			IND; DNQ	GLN	MCH	BRI	NHA	DAR	RCH	DOV								N/A	0	

==== Nationwide Series ====
NASCAR Nationwide Series results
Year	Team	No.	Make	1	2	3	4	5	6	7	8	9	10	11	12	13	14	15	16	17	18	19	20	21	22	23	24	25	26	27	28	29	30	31	32	33	34	35	NNSC	Pts	Ref
1986	MacDonald Motorsports	86	Pontiac	DAY	CAR	HCY	MAR	BRI	DAR	SBO	LGY	JFC	DOV	CLT	SBO	HCY	ROU	IRP	SBO	RAL	OXF; 26	SBO	HCY	LGY	ROU	BRI	DAR	RCH	DOV	MAR	ROU	CLT	CAR	MAR					121st	0	
1987	MacDonald Motorsports	86	Pontiac	DAY	HCY	MAR	DAR	BRI	LGY	SBO	CLT	DOV	IRP	ROU	JFC	OXF; 21	SBO	HCY	RAL	LGY	ROU	BRI	JFC	DAR	RCH	DOV	MAR	CLT	CAR	MAR									93rd	0	
1990	MacDonald Motorsports	16	Pontiac	DAY; DNQ	RCH	CAR; 31	MAR	HCY	DAR	BRI	LAN	SBO	NZH	HCY	CLT	DOV	ROU	VOL	MYB	OXF	NHA	SBO	DUB	IRP	ROU	BRI	DAR	RCH	DOV	MAR	CLT	NHA	CAR	MAR					101st	70	
1991	MacDonald Motorsports	16	Pontiac	DAY; 9	RCH	CAR	MAR	VOL	HCY	DAR	BRI	LAN	SBO	NZH	CLT	DOV	ROU	HCY	MYB	GLN	OXF	NHA	SBO	DUB	IRP	ROU	BRI	DAR	RCH	DOV	CLT	NHA	CAR	MAR					84th	138	
1992	MacDonald Motorsports	01	Pontiac	DAY; 41	CAR	RCH	ATL	MAR																															90th	134	
1992	MacDonald Motorsports	01	Chevy						DAR; 23	BRI	HCY	LAN	DUB	NZH	CLT	DOV	ROU	MYB	GLN	VOL	NHA	TAL	IRP	ROU	MCH	NHA	BRI	DAR	RCH	DOV	CLT	MAR	CAR	HCY					90th	134	
1993	MacDonald Motorsports	01	Chevy	DAY; 16	CAR	RCH	DAR	BRI	HCY	ROU	MAR	NZH	CLT	DOV	MYB	GLN	MLW	TAL	IRP	MCH	NHA	BRI	DAR	RCH	DOV; 18	ROU	CLT	MAR	CAR	HCY	ATL								65th	224	
1994	MacDonald Motorsports	01	Chevy	DAY; 18	CAR																							DOV; 21	CLT	MAR	CAR								60th	361	
1994	Key Motorsports	05	Chevy			RCH; 21	ATL; 37	MAR	DAR	HCY	BRI	ROU	NHA	NZH	CLT	DOV	MYB	GLN	MLW	SBO	TAL	HCY	IRP	MCH	BRI	DAR	RCH												60th	361	
1995	MacDonald Motorsports	01	Chevy	DAY	CAR	RCH	ATL	NSV	DAR	BRI	HCY	NHA	NZH	CLT	DOV	MYB	GLN; 23	MLW	TAL	SBO	IRP	MCH	BRI	DAR	RCH	DOV	CLT	CAR; DNQ	HOM										90th	94	
1998	Whitaker Racing	7	Chevy	DAY	CAR	LVS	NSV	DAR	BRI	TEX	HCY	TAL	NHA	NZH	CLT	DOV	RCH	PPR	GLN	MLW	MYB	CAL	SBO	IRP	MCH	BRI	DAR	RCH	DOV	CLT	GTY	CAR	ATL; DNQ	HOM					N/A	0	
1999	Vince DiAugustine Racing	54	Chevy	DAY	CAR	LVS	ATL	DAR	TEX	NSV	BRI	TAL	CAL	NHA	RCH	NZH	CLT	DOV	SBO	GLN	MLW	MYB	PPR	GTY	IRP	MCH	BRI	DAR	RCH	DOV	CLT	CAR	MEM	PHO	HOM; DNQ				N/A	0	
2003	MacDonald Motorsports	72	Pontiac	DAY; 22	CAR	LVS																																	81st	287	
2003	MacDonald Motorsports	72	Chevy				DAR; 39	BRI	TEX	TAL; 42	NSH	CAL	RCH; DNQ	GTY	NZH	CLT	DOV	NSH	KEN	MLW	DAY	CHI	NHA	PPR	IRP	MCH	BRI	DAR; 39	RCH; 34	DOV	KAN	CLT	MEM	ATL	PHO; DNQ	CAR	HOM		81st	287	
2004	MacDonald Motorsports	72	Chevy	DAY	CAR	LVS	DAR	BRI	TEX	NSH; 30	TAL; 34	CAL; 35	GTY	RCH	NZH; 34	CLT	DOV	NSH; 27	KEN	MLW	DAY	CHI		PPR; 24	IRP	MCH	BRI	CAL	RCH	DOV	KAN	CLT	MEM	ATL	PHO	DAR	HOM		64th	426	
2004	MacDonald Motorsports	71	Chevy																				NHA; DNQ																64th	426	
2005	MacDonald Motorsports	71	Chevy	DAY	CAL	MXC	LVS	ATL	NSH	BRI	TEX	PHO	TAL	DAR	RCH	CLT	DOV	NSH	KEN	MLW	DAY	CHI	NHA	PPR; QL^{†}	GTY														129th	67	
2005	MacDonald Motorsports	72	Chevy																							IRP; 32	GLN	MCH	BRI	CAL	RCH	DOV	KAN	CLT	MEM	TEX	PHO	HOM	129th	67	
2006	Jay Robinson Racing	28	Chevy	DAY	CAL	MXC	LVS	ATL	BRI	TEX	NSH	PHO	TAL; 43	RCH	DAR	CLT	DOV	NSH	KEN	MLW	DAY	CHI	NHA																136th	49	
2006	MacDonald Motorsports	72	Chevy																					MAR; 38	GTY	IRP; 35	GLN	MCH	BRI	CAL	RCH	DOV	KAN	CLT	MEM	TEX	PHO	HOM	136th	49	
2007	MacDonald Motorsports	71	Chevy	DAY	CAL	MXC	LVS	ATL	BRI	NSH	TEX	PHO	TAL	RCH	DAR	CLT	DOV; 43	NSH	KEN	MLW																			157th	34	
2007	MacDonald Motorsports	72	Dodge																		NHA; 43	DAY	CHI	GTY	IRP	CGV	GLN	MCH	BRI	CAL	RCH	DOV	KAN	CLT	MEM	TEX	PHO	HOM	157th	34	
2008	MacDonald Motorsports	81	Dodge	DAY	CAL	LVS	ATL	BRI	NSH	TEX	PHO	MXC	TAL	RCH	DAR	CLT	DOV	NSH	KEN	MLW	NHA; 26	DAY	CHI	GTY	IRP; 25	CGV	GLN	MCH	BRI	CAL	RCH	DOV	KAN	CLT	MEM	TEX	PHO	HOM	101st	173	
^{†} - Qualified but replaced by Dale Quarterley

==== Craftsman Truck Series ====
NASCAR Craftsman Truck Series results
Year	Team	No.	Make	1	2	3	4	5	6	7	8	9	10	11	12	13	14	15	16	17	18	19	20	21	22	23	24	25	26	27	NCTC	Pts	Ref
1996	Mansion Motorsports	01	Ford	HOM	PHO	POR	EVG	TUS	CNS	HPT	BRI	NZH	MLW	LVL	I70	IRP	FLM	GLN	NSV	RCH	NHA	MAR	NWS; 30	SON	MMR	PHO	LVS				117th	73	
1997	Mansion Motorsports	0	Ford	WDW; 19	TUS																										55th	371	
1997	MacDonald Motorsports	72	Chevy			HOM; 25	PHO	POR	EVG	I70	NHA; 33	TEX	BRI																		55th	371	
1997	Blake Motorsports	12	Chevy											NZH; 29	MLW	LVL	CNS	HPT	IRP	FLM	NSV	GLN	RCH	MAR	SON	MMR	CAL	PHO	LVS		55th	371	
1998	Greenfield Racing	06	Dodge	WDW	HOM; 29	PHO	POR	EVG	I70	GLN; 11				NZH; 19	CAL	PPR															32nd	964	
1998	MB Motorsports	26	Ford								TEX; 32	BRI	MLW; 28				IRP; 23	NHA			HPT; 26	LVL	RCH		GTY; 20	MAR	SON	MMR	PHO	LVS	32nd	964	
1998	Greenfield Racing	09	Dodge																FLM; 8	NSV											32nd	964	
1998	K Automotive Racing	29	Dodge																					MEM; 27							32nd	964	
1999	Greenfield Racing	06	Dodge	HOM; 13	PHO	EVG	MMR	MAR; 18	MEM	PPR	I70																				40th	470	
1999	Raptor Performance Motorsports	81	Ford									BRI; 25	TEX	PIR	GLN	MLW	NSV	NZH	MCH								TEX; 29	CAL			40th	470	
1999	Raptor Performance Motorsports	51	Ford																	NHA; 30	IRP	GTY	HPT	RCH	LVS	LVL					40th	470	
2000	MacDonald Motorsports	72	Chevy	DAY; 6	HOM; 20	PHO; 29	MMR; 17	MAR; 32	PIR; 16	GTY; 17	MEM; 25	PPR; 15	EVG; 23	TEX; 25	KEN; 20	GLN; 20	MLW; 23	NHA; 30		MCH; 27	IRP; 19	NSV; 28	CIC; 31	RCH; 22		TEX; 14	CAL; 25				19th	2321	
2000	MacDonald Motorsports	72	Dodge																NZH; 26						DOV; 22						19th	2321	
2001	MacDonald Motorsports	72	Chevy	DAY; 30	HOM	MMR	MAR	GTY	DAR	PPR	DOV	TEX	MEM	MLW	KAN	KEN	NHA	IRP	NSH	CIC	NZH	RCH	SBO	TEX	LVS	PHO	CAL				106th	73	
2002	MacDonald Motorsports	72	Chevy	DAY; 14	DAR; 19	MAR; 32	GTY; 24	PPR; 24	DOV; 22	TEX; 23		MLW; 20	KAN; 18	KEN; 23	NHA; 21	MCH; 29	IRP; 14	NSH; 36	RCH; 27	TEX; 17	SBO; 18	LVS; 22									19th	2128	
2002	Troxell Racing	93	Chevy								MEM; 20												CAL; 20	PHO; 20	HOM; 23						19th	2128	
2003	Troxell-MacDonald Racing	72	Chevy	DAY; 32	DAR; 22	MMR; 23	MAR; 20		DOV; 14	TEX; 16	MEM; 36	MLW; 14	KAN; 17	KEN; 16	GTW; 17	MCH; 28	IRP; 13	NSH; 21	BRI; 20	RCH; 18	NHA; 28	CAL; 21	LVS; 24	SBO; 25	TEX; 23	MAR; 23	PHO; 25	HOM; 24			15th	2458	
2003	Troxell-MacDonald Racing	72	Dodge					CLT; 19																							15th	2458	
2004	Troxell-MacDonald Racing	72	Chevy	DAY; 21	ATL	MAR	MFD	CLT	DOV	TEX	MEM	MLW	KAN	KEN	GTW	MCH	IRP	NSH	BRI	RCH	NHA	LVS	CAL	TEX	MAR	PHO	DAR	HOM			90th	100	
2007	Green Light Racing	06	Chevy	DAY	CAL	ATL	MAR	KAN	CLT	MFD	DOV	TEX	MCH	MLW; 36	MEM	KEN	IRP	NSH	BRI	GTW	NHA	LVS	TAL	MAR	ATL	TEX	PHO	HOM			120th	0	

== See also ==
- List of Canadian NASCAR drivers
