= Chris Lafferty =

American racing driver

- Born: May 28, 1977 (age 49); Vacaville, California, U.S.

NASCAR FedEx Freight Truck Series career
- 29 races run over 5 years
- 2013 position: 35th
- Best finish: 35th (2013)
- First race: 2009 Lucas Oil 150 (Phoenix)
- Last race: 2013 WinStar World Casino 350K (Texas)
Wins	Top tens	Poles
0	0	0

Chris Lafferty (born May 28, 1977) is an American professional stock car racing driver, crew chief, and former team owner of Lafferty Motorsports. He last competed part-time in the NASCAR Camping World Truck Series, driving for JJC Racing.

== Racing career ==
After growing up in Vacaville, California, Lafferty moved to Concord, North Carolina in 1998 to pursue a racing career. In addition to working as an engine builder, he was a journalist for various racing magazines.

In 2003, he formed Lafferty Motorsports. In addition to competing in the ARCA Re/Max Series and NASCAR Craftsman Truck Series, the team ran a driver development program; members of the program included regional truck racer Russ Dugger, dirt track racing drivers Tyler Hudson and Cole Exum, and kart racers Bryan Hayberger and Andrew Broucher.

Lafferty made his Truck Series debut in 2009 at Phoenix International Raceway; he had failed to qualify in his first attempt at Martinsville Speedway.

In 2011, Lafferty ran four Truck races in a truck promoting the Tea Party movement in the buildup to the 2012 United States presidential election. In 2012, he partnered with Fox Sports to create Chris Lafferty's Motorsports TV, a biweekly television program that also featured his daughter Hannah hosting a kid-friendly segment.

Lafferty returned to ARCA in 2015 with Carter 2 Motorsports at Lucas Oil Raceway. He finished 27th after retiring on lap 98 with electrical problems.

In 2017, Lafferty joined ESPN Radio as a talk show host for The Sam and Chris Show alongside NASCAR artist Sam Bass.

== Motorsports career results ==
=== NASCAR ===
(key) (Bold – Pole position awarded by qualifying time. Italics – Pole position earned by points standings or practice time. * – Most laps led.)

==== Camping World Truck Series ====
NASCAR Camping World Truck Series results
Year	Team	No.	Make	1	2	3	4	5	6	7	8	9	10	11	12	13	14	15	16	17	18	19	20	21	22	23	24	25	NCWTC	Pts	Ref
2009	Lafferty Motorsports	89	Chevy	DAY	CAL	ATL	MAR	KAN	CLT	DOV	TEX	MCH	MLW	MEM	KEN	IRP	NSH	BRI	CHI	IOW	GTW	NHA	LVS	MAR; DNQ	TAL	TEX	PHO; 35	HOM	118th	-	
2010	Lafferty Motorsports	89	Chevy	DAY	ATL	MAR; 33	NSH	KAN	DOV; 36	CLT	TEX	MCH	IOW; DNQ	GTW	IRP; 30	POC	NSH; 30							MAR; DNQ	TAL		PHO; 35	HOM	56th	396	
2010	Lafferty Motorsports	24	Chevy															DAR; 31	BRI	CHI		NHA; 33							56th	396	
2010	Daisy Ramirez Motorsports	01	Dodge																		KEN; 30								56th	396	
2010	Lafferty Motorsports	89	Dodge																				LVS; DNQ			TEX; DNQ			56th	396	
2011	Lafferty Motorsports	89	Chevy	DAY	PHO	DAR; DNQ	MAR	NSH									POC; 31	MCH; 26	BRI	ATL	CHI	NHA	KEN	LVS	TAL	MAR	TEX	HOM	80th	8	
2011	JJC Racing	10	Chevy						DOV; 36	CLT	KAN	TEX	KEN	IOW															80th	8	
2011	Lafferty Motorsports	89	Dodge												NSH; 31	IRP; Wth													80th	8	
2012	JJC Racing	10	Chevy	DAY	MAR; DNQ	CAR	KAN	CLT	DOV																				51st	48	
2012	JJC Racing	0	Ram							TEX; 34		IOW; 34		POC; 35	MCH	BRI	ATL												51st	48	
2012	JJC Racing	10	Ram								KEN; DNQ																		51st	48	
2012	MB Motorsports	65	Chevy										CHI; DNQ							LVS; 24	TAL	MAR	TEX	PHO	HOM				51st	48	
2012	JJC Racing	0	Ford															IOW; 35	KEN										51st	48	
2013	JJC Racing	0	Ram	DAY	MAR	CAR	KAN	CLT	DOV; 35					POC; 34	MCH; 26	BRI													35th	124	
2013	JJC Racing	99	Chevy							TEX; 29																			35th	124	
2013	JJC Racing	0	Ford								KEN; 36	IOW; 35	ELD																35th	124	
2013	JJC Racing	0	Chevy														MSP; 30	IOW; 36	CHI; 35	LVS; 29	TAL	MAR	TEX; 35	PHO	HOM				35th	124	

=== ARCA Racing Series ===
(key) (Bold – Pole position awarded by qualifying time. Italics – Pole position earned by points standings or practice time. * – Most laps led.)

ARCA Racing Series results
Year	Team	No.	Make	1	2	3	4	5	6	7	8	9	10	11	12	13	14	15	16	17	18	19	20	21	ARSC	Pts	Ref
2009	Lafferty Motorsports	89	Chevy	DAY	SLM	CAR	TAL	KEN	TOL	POC	MCH	MFD	IOW	KEN	BLN	POC; 41									104th	210	
2009	Lafferty Motorsports	7	Chevy														ISF; 24	CHI	TOL	DSF; 32	NJE	SLM	KAN	CAR	104th	210	
2015	Carter 2 Motorsports	97	Dodge	DAY	MOB	NSH	SLM	TAL	TOL	NJE	POC	MCH	CHI	WIN	IOW	IRP	POC	BLN	ISF; 27	DSF	SLM	KEN	KAN		129th	95	
