= NASCAR O'Reilly Auto Parts Series at Iowa Speedway =

NASCAR O'Reilly Auto Parts Series races at Iowa Speedway

NASCAR O'Reilly Auto Parts Series
- Venue: Iowa Speedway
- Location: Newton, Iowa, United States

Circuit information
- Surface: Asphalt
- Length: 0.875 mi (1.408 km)
- Turns: 4

Stock car racing events in the NASCAR O'Reilly Auto Parts Series have been held at the Iowa Speedway. The track held 2 races annually from 2011 to 2020, when the track was removed due to the COVID-19 pandemic. The track returned to the schedule following the release of the 2024 NASCAR Xfinity Series schedule, supporting a Cup Series race on the same weekend.

== Current race ==
Hy-Vee PERKS 250
- Corporate sponsor: Hy-Vee
- First race: 2011
- Distance: 218.75 miles (352.04 km)
- Laps: 250 (Stage 1: 75 Stage 2: 75 Stage 3: 100)
- Previous names: Iowa John Deere Dealers 250 presented by Pioneer (2011); Pioneer Hi-Bred 250 (2012); DuPont Pioneer 250 (2013); Get to Know Newton 250 (2014); 3M 250 (2015); American Ethanol E15 250 presented by Enogen (2016–2017); Iowa 250 presented by Enogen (2018); CircuitCity.com 250 presented by Tamron (2019)
- Most wins (driver): Ricky Stenhouse Jr. Sam Hornish Jr. Sam Mayer (2)
- Most wins (team): Roush Fenway Racing; JR Motorsports (4)
- Most wins (manufacturer): Ford (5)

The Hy-Vee PERKS 250 is a 250-lap, 218.75-mile NASCAR O'Reilly Auto Parts Series race at Iowa Speedway in Newton, Iowa. The race has been held in May or June from 2011 to 2019 and was going to be held again in 2020 before being canceled due to the COVID-19 pandemic. The race was removed from the Xfinity Series schedule entirely in 2021. The race returned to the schedule in 2024.

Carson Kvapil is the defending race winner.

=== History ===
In the race's first year in 2011, Ricky Stenhouse Jr. earned his first win in what was then the Nationwide Series despite his engine blowing coming to the start/finish line on the last lap. His Roush Fenway Racing teammate Carl Edwards, who was running 2nd, could not see through the smoke coming from Stenhouse's car and as a result, he hit the back of Stenhouse's car which allowed him to cross the start/finish line 1st and win.

The race had different title sponsor almost every year in its first stint on the schedule. The revived Circuit City brand was the race's title sponsor in the last of those years in 2019. On March 27, 2024, Hy-Vee was announced as the title sponsor of the race in 2024 in its first year on the series' schedule since 2019. The grocery store has been the title sponsor of the IndyCar Series doubleheader races at the track since 2022. The store is highlighting their rewards program PERKS in the name of the race. The track also announced in that announcement that the 2024 race had been sold out.

=== Past winners ===
Year	Date	No.	Driver	Team	Manufacturer	Race Distance		Race Time	Average Speed (mph)	Report	Ref
Year	Date	No.	Driver	Team	Manufacturer	Laps	Miles (km)	Race Time	Average Speed (mph)	Report	Ref
2011	May 22	6	Ricky Stenhouse Jr.	Roush Fenway Racing	Ford	250	218.75 (352.044)	2:03:40	106.132	Report	
2012	May 20	6	Ricky Stenhouse Jr.	Roush Fenway Racing	Ford	250	218.75 (352.044)	2:02:29	107.157	Report	
2013	June 9*	6	Trevor Bayne	Roush Fenway Racing	Ford	250	218.75 (352.044)	2:08:05	102.472	Report	
2014	May 18	54	Sam Hornish Jr.	Joe Gibbs Racing	Toyota	250	218.72 (352.044)	2:04:28	105.45	Report	
2015	May 17	60	Chris Buescher	Roush Fenway Racing	Ford	259*	226.625 (364.717)	2:24:17	94.242	Report	
2016	June 19	18	Sam Hornish Jr.	Joe Gibbs Racing	Toyota	250	218.72 (352.044)	2:07:51	102.659	Report	
2017	June 24	9	William Byron	JR Motorsports	Chevrolet	250	218.72 (352.044)	2:32:52	85.859	Report	
2018	June 17	7	Justin Allgaier	JR Motorsports	Chevrolet	250	218.72 (352.044)	2:08:33	102.100	Report	
2019	June 16	20	Christopher Bell	Joe Gibbs Racing	Toyota	250	218.72 (352.044)	2:19:02	94.402	Report	
2020 – 2023	Not held										
2024	June 15	1	Sam Mayer	JR Motorsports	Chevrolet	253*	221.375 (356.317)	2:36:27	84.899	Report	
2025	August 2	41	Sam Mayer	Haas Factory Team	Ford	250	218.72 (352.044)	2:29:26	87.832	Report	
2026	August 8	1	Carson Kvapil	JR Motorsports	Chevrolet	260*	227.5 (366.12)	2:43:38	83.418	Report	
2027	July 3									Report	

- 2013: Race postponed from Saturday to Sunday due to rain.
- 2015, 2024 & 2026: Races extended due to NASCAR Overtime.
- 2020: Race cancelled and moved to Homestead–Miami due to the COVID-19 pandemic.

==== Multiple winners (drivers) ====
# Wins	Driver	Years won
2	Ricky Stenhouse Jr.	2011–2012
2	Sam Hornish Jr.	2014, 2016
2	Sam Mayer	2024-2025

==== Multiple winners (teams) ====
# Wins	Team	Years won
4	Roush Fenway Racing	2011–2013, 2015
4	JR Motorsports	2017, 2018, 2024, 2026
3	Joe Gibbs Racing	2014, 2016, 2019

==== Manufacturer wins ====
# Wins	Make	Years won
5	(United States) Ford	2011–2013, 2015, 2025
4	(United States) Chevrolet	2017, 2018, 2024, 2026
3	(Japan) Toyota	2014, 2016, 2019

== Former second race ==
U.S. Cellular 250
- Corporate sponsor: U.S. Cellular
- First race: 2009
- Last race: 2019
- Distance: 218.75 miles (352.04 km)
- Laps: 250 (Stage 1: 60 Stage 2: 60 Stage 3: 130)
- Most wins (driver): Brad Keselowski (3)
- Most wins (team): Joe Gibbs Racing (4)
- Most wins (manufacturer): Ford (5)

The U.S. Cellular 250 was a 250-lap, 218.75-mile NASCAR Xfinity Series race which was held at Iowa Speedway in Newton, Iowa every summer from 2009 to 2019. It was traditionally held in late July or early August, while U.S. Cellular was the title sponsor every year since the event's inception with different presenting sponsors over the years. The race was canceled in 2020 due to the COVID-19 pandemic before being removed from the schedule entirely in 2021.

=== Past winners ===
Year	Date	No.	Driver	Team	Manufacturer	Race Distance		Race Time	Average Speed (mph)	Report
Year	Date	No.	Driver	Team	Manufacturer	Laps	Miles (km)	Race Time	Average Speed (mph)	Report
2009	August 1	88	Brad Keselowski	JR Motorsports	Chevrolet	250	218.75 (352.044)	2:22:53	91.858	Report
2010	July 31	18	Kyle Busch	Joe Gibbs Racing	Toyota	250	218.75 (352.044)	2:05:56	104.222	Report
2011	August 6	6	Ricky Stenhouse Jr.	Roush Fenway Racing	Ford	250	218.75 (352.044)	2:11:20	99.937	Report
2012	August 4	2	Elliott Sadler	Richard Childress Racing	Chevrolet	250	218.75 (352.044)	1:53:31	115.622	Report
2013	August 3	22	Brad Keselowski	Penske Racing	Ford	250	218.75 (352.044)	1:56:58	112.211	Report
2014	August 2	22	Brad Keselowski	Team Penske	Ford	250	218.75 (352.044)	2:02:49	106.867	Report
2015	August 1	22	Ryan Blaney	Team Penske	Ford	260*	227.5 (366.125)	2:12:02	103.383	Report
2016	July 30	20	Erik Jones	Joe Gibbs Racing	Toyota	250	218.75 (352.044)	2:05:43	104.401	Report
2017	July 29	20	Ryan Preece	Joe Gibbs Racing	Toyota	254*	222.25 (357.676)	2:17:37	96.9	Report
2018	July 28	20	Christopher Bell	Joe Gibbs Racing	Toyota	257*	224.875 (361.901)	2:18:00	97.772	Report
2019	July 27	98	Chase Briscoe	Stewart–Haas Racing with Biagi-DenBeste	Ford	250	218.75 (352.044)	2:28:00	88.682	Report
2020*	August 1	Race Canceled and moved to Kansas Speedway due to COVID-19 pandemic								

- 2015, 2017 and 2018: Race extended due to overtime.
- 2020: Race canceled and moved to Kansas due to the COVID-19 pandemic.

==== Multiple winners (drivers) ====
# Wins	Driver	Years won
3	Brad Keselowski	2009, 2013, 2014

==== Multiple winners (teams) ====
# Wins	Team	Years won
4	Joe Gibbs Racing	2010, 2016, 2017, 2018
3	Team Penske	2013, 2014, 2015

==== Manufacturer wins ====
# Wins	Make	Years won
5	(United States) Ford	2011, 2013, 2014, 2015, 2019
4	(Japan) Toyota	2010, 2016, 2017, 2018
2	(United States) Chevrolet	2009, 2012

Previous race: Cuervo 300	NASCAR O'Reilly Auto Parts Series; Hy-Vee PERKS 250	Next race: Pit Boss/FoodMaxx 250
