= MacDonald Motorsports =

Former NASCAR team

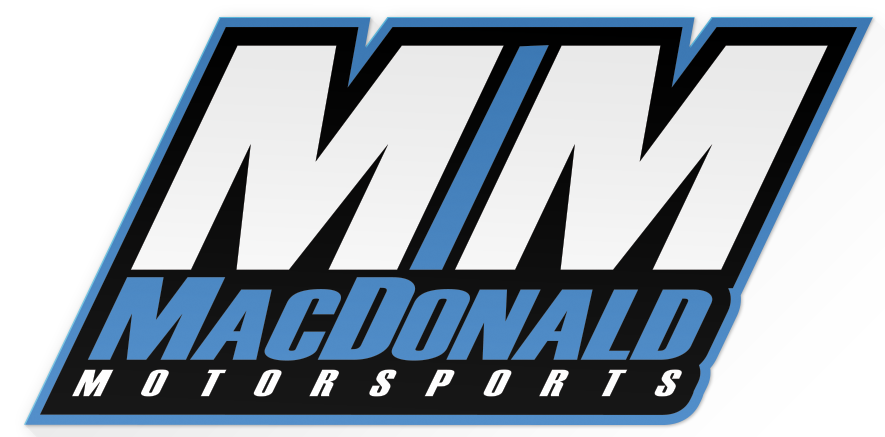
- Owner(s): Randy MacDonald; Pat MacDonald
- Base: Thomasville, North Carolina
- Series: Nationwide Series; K&N Pro Series East
- Manufacturer: Toyota; Dodge

Career
- Debut: 2000 Florida Dodge Dealers 250 (Trucks); 2003 Koolerz 300 (Nationwide)
- Latest race: 2012 Ford 300
- Drivers' Championships: 0

MacDonald Motorsports (MMS) was a NASCAR team owned by former NASCAR Sprint Cup series driver Randy MacDonald, his mother, Pat MacDonald and his daughter Jenifer MacDonald.

== Craftsman Truck Series ==
MacDonald made its NASCAR debut in 2000 at Daytona International Speedway. Randy MacDonald drove the No. 72 3M Chevrolet Silverado to a sixth-place finish. MacDonald drove the truck full-time for the rest of the season and finished nineteenth in points. MacDonald’s bid for the championship the next season ended early when he suffered a neck injury in a wreck at Daytona. Rob Morgan took over for the next race at Homestead–Miami Speedway, where he finished 27th, before Steve Portenga, Jerry Hill, and Jimmy Hensley finished out the year in the truck, which finished 18th in owner’s points. Throughout the season, the team also got sponsorship from the Left Behind book series as well.

Randy MacDonald returned to the driver’s seat of the 72 in 2002, where he had ten top-twenty fishes and finished nineteenth in points. He followed that up with a fifteenth-place points finish in 2003. During the 2002 season, Teri MacDonald made two races for the team, one in the new No. 71 truck, and the other in the No. 72 while Randy raced for Troxell Racing. MacDonald made his final Truck race in 2004 at Daytona, where he finished 21st with Drill Doctor sponsorship. Jerry Hill and Teri MacDonald then took over for two races apiece in the 2004 season, where Macdonald, had a best finish of 25th at Mansfield Motorsports Speedway, and Hill a 26th at Atlanta Motor Speedway. The team soon stopped running the Truck Series following that season.

=== Truck No. 71 results ===
Year	Driver	No.	Make	1	2	3	4	5	6	7	8	9	10	11	12	13	14	15	16	17	18	19	20	Owners	Pts
1995	Kenji Momota	71	Chevy	PHO	TUS	SGS	MMR	POR	EVG	I70	LVL	BRI	MLW	CNS	HPT	IRP	FLM	RCH	MAR	NWS; DNQ	SON	MMR	PHO; 37		

=== Truck No. 72 results ===
Year	Driver	No.	Make	1	2	3	4	5	6	7	8	9	10	11	12	13	14	15	16	17	18	19	20	21	22	23	24	25	26	Owners	Pts
1997	Randy MacDonald	72	Chevy	WDW	TUS	HOM; 25	PHO	POR	EVG	I70	NHA; 33	TEX	BRI	NZH	MLW	LVL	CNS	HPT	IRP	FLM	NSV										
1997	Tammy Jo Kirk	72	Chevy																			GLN; DNQ	RCH; 30	MAR; DNQ	SON	MMR	CAL	PHO	LVS		
2000	Randy MacDonald	72	Chevy	DAY; 6	HOM; 20	PHO; 29	MMR; 17	MAR; 32	PIR; 16	GTY; 17	MEM; 25	PPR; 15	EVG; 23	TEX; 25	KEN; 20	GLN; 20	MLW; 23	NHA; 30		MCH; 27	IRP; 19	NSV; 28	CIC; 31	RCH; 22		TEX; 14	CAL; 25				
2000	Randy MacDonald	72	Dodge																NZH; 26						DOV; 22						
2001	Randy MacDonald	72	Chevy	DAY; 30																											
2001	Rob Morgan	72	Chevy		HOM; 27																										
2001	Steve Portenga	72	Chevy			MMR; 32									KAN; 14																
2001	Jimmy Hensley	72	Chevy				MAR; 25	GTY; 13	DAR; 33	PPR; 14	DOV; 26	TEX; 32	MEM; 15	MLW; 26		KEN; 13				CIC; 25				TEX; 14							
2001	Jimmy Hensley	72	Dodge																		NZH; 14	RCH; 16	SBO; 25		LVS; 15	PHO; 20	CAL; 30				
2001	Jerry Hill	72	Chevy														NHA; 28	IRP; 24													
2001	Lance Hooper	72	Chevy																NSH; 12												
2002	Randy MacDonald	72	Chevy	DAY; 14	DAR; 19	MAR; 32	GTY; 24	PPR; 24	DOV; 22	TEX; 23		MLW; 20	KAN; 18	KEN; 23	NHA; 21	MCH; 29	IRP; 14	NSH; 36	RCH; 27	TEX; 17	SBO; 18	LVS; 22									
2002	Teri MacDonald	72	Chevy								MEM; 29														HOM; 34						
2002	Aaron Daniel	72	Chevy																				CAL; 29								
2002	Blake Mallory	72	Chevy																					PHO; 27							
2003	Randy MacDonald	72	Chevy	DAY; 32	DAR; 22	MMR; 23	MAR; 20		DOV; 14	TEX; 16	MEM; 36	MLW; 14	KAN; 17	KEN; 16	GTW; 17	MCH; 28	IRP; 13	NSH; 21	BRI; 20	RCH; 18	NHA; 28	CAL; 21	LVS; 24	SBO; 25	TEX; 23	MAR; 23	PHO; 25	HOM; 24			
2003	Randy MacDonald	72	Dodge					CLT; 19																							
2004	Randy MacDonald	72	Chevy	DAY; 21																											
2004	Jerry Hill	72	Chevy		ATL; 26	MAR			DOV; 32	TEX																					
2004	Teri MacDonald	72	Chevy				MFD; 25	CLT			MEM; 32	MLW																			
2004	Ryck Sanders	72	Chevy										KAN; 32	KEN	GTW; 32	MCH	IRP	NSH	BRI	RCH	NHA	LVS	CAL	TEX	MAR	PHO	DAR	HOM			

== Nationwide Series ==
MacDonald’s Nationwide Series team made its debut in 2003 at the Koolerz 300. Randy MacDonald finished 22nd in the 72 Pontiac Grand Prix. He ran five more races that season, with the Koolerz 300 garnering his best result. In 2004, Larry Gunselman ran the first three races for MacDonald, finishing 22nd at Daytona, before Lance Hooper, MacDonald, Jason White, and Jamie Mosley began running select races. Kevin Lepage and Stan Boyd finished out the year for the team.

For 2005, Donnie Neuenberger began the year as driver at Daytona, where he finished 38th after suffering an engine failure, then Eric Norris and Ruben Garcia Novoa ran the next two races. Geoff Bodine was then announced as the team’s full-time driver, but left the team after the Federated Auto Parts 300. Wade Day, Lepage, and Dale Quarterly were among those who finished out the year for the team. At the end of the season, the team announced it was closing down and selling its equipment and shop, but that was soon retracted.

D. J. Kennington ran eleven races for MacDonald in 2007, with a best finish of twenty-third at Dover. MacDonald switched to Dodges and the No. 81 in 2008 and attempted a full schedule, with Kennington running about 20 races. During the races Kennington missed he was racing in the NASCAR Canadian Tire Series. He was signed on for another season in 2009, but left after nine races to focus on his Canadian Tire championship bid. After his departure, many drivers took over for the rest of the season, including Patrick Sheltra, Bobby Hamilton Jr., Kevin Hamlin, Sean Murphy, J. J. Yeley, Jeff Green, Mike Bliss, Bobby Hillin Jr., Blake Koch, and Alex Tagliani.

In 2010, Michael McDowell drove the 81 for MMS, finishing 21st in points. McDowell left for HP Racing at the end of the year, and MacDonald signed on Neuenberger for 10 races in the 81 while Koch returned to drive 20 races for ROTY honors. However, Koch's sponsorship from Daystar Television Network was expanded to the rest of the year, putting Koch in the 81 for the rest of 2011. Koch lost the Rookie title to Timmy Hill by a single point. Reed Sorenson was hired on the weekend of the Kansas race to drive the team's second car after being released from the Turner Motorsports team. Sorenson stayed with MacDonald the rest of 2011 and ended up 5th in points at the end of the year. At one point during the 20

K&N West Series champion Jason Bowles drove the No. 81 with sponsorship from American Majority and PledgeToVote.com during the 2012 racing season and finished 13th in points.

== K&N Pro Series East ==
Starting in 2012, the daughter of Randy, Jenifer became a K&N Pro Series car owner fielding No. 49 and No. 94 Dodges and Toyotas for Scott Saunders, Jason Bowles, Sean Caisse, Akinori Ogata, Harrison Rhodes and Austin Hill. The best finish of the team was 8th with Rhodes behind the wheel at CNB Bank Raceway Park.

The team returned in 2013, now with only Toyotas. Ray Courtemanche, Jr, Jordan Anderson, Harrison Rhodes, Josh Reaume and Clint King drove for the team that year.
