= Mighty Motorsports =

Former NASCAR team

- Owner(s): Lonnie Troxell, Rob Ferguson
- Base: Mooresville, North Carolina
- Series: Craftsman Truck Series
- Race drivers: Wayne Edwards
- Manufacturer: Chevrolet
- Opened: 2000
- Closed: 2006

Career
- Drivers' Championships: 0
- Race victories: 0

Mighty Motorsports is a defunct NASCAR Craftsman Truck Series team. Owned by racer Rob Ferguson, it fielded the No. 24 PMI Heating and Air Conditioning Chevrolet Silverado driven by Wayne Edwards in the early part of 2006 before its closure. The team was sold to Ferguson by previous owner Lonnie Troxell in 2005. The team's corporate headquarters were located in Poway, California, but the shop was in Mooresville, North Carolina.

The team made its debut in 2000 at Homestead-Miami Speedway. Edwards, who was a co-owner of the team, drove the No. 93 WorldBestBuy.com Chevy to a 27th-place finish. Edwards ran twelve other races that year, his best finish a 19th at Loudon, leading to a 30th-place finish in the owner's points. Edwards made two starts for the team in 2001, both resulting in early engine failures. Other drivers raced for Troxell that year were Mike Harmon, Jerry Hill, and Mike Leffingwell. Hill had the best finish for the team, posting a 17th-place run at Texas.

After Edwards left, The team continued to use a rotating cast of drivers in 2002, as Randy Briggs, Jody Lavender, Michael Dokken, Brad Bennett, and Jerry Allec, Jr. all shared the ride during the season. Briggs posted the best finish of the season, a 23rd at Kansas. In 2003, Teri MacDonald began running with Troxell in an aborted run at Rookie of the Year, before Dokken, Trevor Boys, Dana White, Dokken, Roland Isaacs, and Jason White shared the ride for the rest of the season. The team finished 26th in points that season.

In 2004, Edwards returned and had a fifteenth-place run at the Florida Dodge Dealers 250, before Ricky Gonzalez ran the next two races for the team. The team did not attempt a race until the Kroger 200, when Edwards failed to qualify. Ferguson attempted the race at Martinsville Speedway, but also failed to qualify. After 2004, Troxell sold the team to Ferguson, who renamed the team "Mighty Motorsports", as well as purchasing equipment and owner's points from Bang! Racing. Edwards started off the season with a ninth-place run at Daytona, but was soon replaced by Casey Kingsland and Blake Mallory. After Edwards finished out the season for the team, the team did not qualify for a race in 2006.

== Truck No. 24/93 results ==
Year	Driver	No.	Make	1	2	3	4	5	6	7	8	9	10	11	12	13	14	15	16	17	18	19	20	21	22	23	24	25	NCTC	Pts
2000	Wayne Edwards	93	Chevy	DAY; DNQ	HOM; 27	PHO; 25	MMR; 34	MAR; DNQ	PIR	GTY; DNQ	MEM; 23	PPR; 25	EVG	TEX; 23	KEN; 32	GLN; 27	MLW; 29	NHA; 19	NZH; 20	MCH; 33	IRP; DNQ	NSV; DNQ	CIC; DNQ	RCH; DNQ	DOV; 23	TEX; DNQ	CAL		30th	1391
2001	Wayne Edwards	93	Chevy	DAY	HOM	MMR	MAR	GTY; 34	DAR																		CAL; 35		27th	1329
2001	Jonathon Price	93	Chevy							PPR; 22																			27th	1329
2001	Tim Zock	93	Chevy								DOV; 31																		27th	1329
2001	Larry Gunselman	93	Dodge									TEX; 30																	27th	1329
2001	Mike Leffingwell	93	Dodge										MEM; 31																27th	1329
2001	Mike Harmon	93	Dodge											MLW; 34															27th	1329
2001	Jason White	93	Dodge												KAN; 36														27th	1329
2001	Donny Morelock	93	Chevy													KEN; 32													27th	1329
2001	Dale Shaw	93	Chevy														NHA; 33												27th	1329
2001	Roland Isaacs	93	Chevy															IRP; 35											27th	1329
2001	Jerry Hill	93	Chevy																NSH; 28	CIC; 18	NZH; 26	RCH; 29	SBO; 21	TEX; 17	LVS; 32	PHO; DNQ			27th	1329
2002	Randy Briggs	93	Chevy	DAY; 26						TEX; 32																			27th	1624
2002	Randy Briggs	93	Ford										KAN; 23	KEN; 26															27th	1624
2002	Mike Harmon	93	Chevy		DAR; DNQ																								27th	1624
2002	Jerry Allec Jr.	93	Chevy			MAR; DNQ		PPR; 27														LVS; DNQ							27th	1624
2002	Aaron Daniel	93	Ford				GTY; 27																						27th	1624
2002	Larry Gunselman	93	Chevy						DOV; 25																				27th	1624
2002	Randy MacDonald	93	Chevy								MEM; 20												CAL; 20	PHO; 20	HOM; 23				27th	1624
2002	Michael Dokken	93	Chevy									MLW; 34				MCH; 36				TEX; 32									27th	1624
2002	Teri MacDonald	93	Chevy												NHA; 26		IRP; 36												27th	1624
2002	Norm Benning	93	Chevy															NSH; 32											27th	1624
2002	Jody Lavender	93	Chevy																RCH; 33										27th	1624
2002	Brad Bennett	93	Chevy																		SBO; 36								27th	1624
2003	Michael Dokken	93	Chevy	DAY; 31				CLT; DNQ	DOV; 27	TEX; 34																			26th	1548
2003	Teri MacDonald	93	Chevy		DAR; 30																								26th	1548
2003	Trevor Boys	93	Chevy			MMR; 36																							26th	1548
2003	Dana White	93	Chevy				MAR; 36																						26th	1548
2003	Roland Isaacs	93	Chevy								MEM; 30	MLW; 31						NSH; 30	BRI; 31	RCH; 34	NHA; 34			SBO; 35		MAR; 34	PHO; 30		26th	1548
2003	Jason White	93	Chevy										KAN; 35																26th	1548
2003	Jonathon Price	93	Chevy											KEN; 23		MCH; 30									TEX; 36				26th	1548
2003	Jon Lemke	93	Chevy												GTW; 32														26th	1548
2003	Jason York	93	Chevy														IRP; DNQ												26th	1548
2003	Aaron Daniel	93	Chevy																			CAL; DNQ							26th	1548
2003	Jerry Allec Jr.	93	Chevy																				LVS; 34						26th	1548
2003	Derrike Cope	93	Chevy																									HOM; DNQ	26th	1548
2004	Wayne Edwards	93	Ford	DAY; 15	ATL; 28																								47th	284
2004	Wayne Edwards	93	Chevy																	RCH; DNQ	NHA	LVS	CAL	TEX					47th	284
2004	Ricky Gonzalez	93	Dodge			MAR; DNQ	MFD; 26	CLT	DOV	TEX	MEM	MLW	KAN	KEN	GTW	MCH	IRP	NSH	BRI										47th	284
2004	Robbie Ferguson	93	Chevy																						MAR; DNQ	PHO	DAR	HOM	47th	284
2005	Wayne Edwards	24	Chevy	DAY; 9	CAL; 34	ATL; 33			MFD; 35	CLT; DNQ	DOV; 33				KAN; 34	KEN; 27						NHA; 23		MAR; 25	ATL; DNQ	TEX; DNQ	PHO; 28	HOM; DNQ	35th	1444
2005	Wayne Edwards	24	Dodge																	BRI; DNQ									35th	1444
2005	Casey Kingsland	24	Dodge				MAR; 36																						35th	1444
2005	Brandon Bendele	24	Chevy					GTY; DNQ						MLW; DNQ															35th	1444
2005	Blake Mallory	24	Chevy									TEX; 34	MCH; DNQ																35th	1444
2005	Roland Isaacs	24	Chevy														MEM; 36		NSH; DNQ										35th	1444
2005	Robbie Ferguson	24	Chevy															IRP; 33			RCH; DNQ								35th	1444
2005	Robert Richardson Jr.	24	Chevy																				LVS; 29						35th	1444
2006	Wayne Edwards	24	Chevy	DAY; DNQ	CAL; DNQ	ATL	MAR	GTY	CLT	MFD	DOV	TEX	MCH	MLW	KAN	KEN	MEM	IRP	NSH	BRI	NHA	LVS	TAL	MAR	ATL	TEX	PHO	HOM	52nd	89

== Sources ==
- Troxell - NASCAR Owner
- Rob Ferguson Owner Statistics
