= List of NASCAR race wins by Hendrick Motorsports =

Hendrick Motorsports is an American professional stock car racing team that currently competes in the NASCAR Cup Series. The team, founded in 1984 by Rick Hendrick, is one of stock car racing's premier organizations. Hendrick Motorsports has won 16 Cup Series owners and drivers championships, three Truck Series owners and drivers titles, and one O'Reilly Auto Parts Series drivers crown. The team has amassed 326 NASCAR Cup Series victories, 34 O'Reilly Auto Parts Series wins, 26 Truck Series wins, and 7 ARCA Racing Series victories.

Hendrick Motorsports currently fields four full-time Cup Series teams with the Chevrolet Camaro ZL1 1LE, including the No. 5 for Kyle Larson, the No. 9 for Chase Elliott, the No. 24 for William Byron, and the No. 48 for Alex Bowman. The team formerly fielded teams in the now-O'Reilly Auto Parts Series before merging its efforts with JR Motorsports. Hendrick Motorsports also fielded several trucks in the Truck Series, most recently for development driver Chase Elliott in 2013. The team has fielded cars in the past for many NASCAR drivers, including Hall of Famers Jeff Gordon, Mark Martin, Dale Earnhardt Jr., Terry Labonte, Darrell Waltrip, and Benny Parsons, 7-time Cup champion Jimmie Johnson, and others such as Geoff Bodine, Tim Richmond, Ricky Rudd, Ken Schrader, Ricky Craven, Jerry Nadeau, Joe Nemechek, Kyle Busch, Casey Mears, and Kasey Kahne.

== Cup Series ==
In the NASCAR Cup Series, which has been sponsored by Winston, Nextel, Sprint, and Monster Energy during the existence of Hendrick Motorsports, the team has won 326 races and 16 championships. The team has won at nearly every track on which it has competed, with the exception of Kentucky Speedway, Indianapolis Road Course, Coronado Street Course, the Bristol dirt configuration, and the Autódromo Hermanos Rodríguez. It has won at least one race each year since its inception in 1984, with the exception of 1985. In 2007, Hendrick set a team record for wins in a single season, winning 18 of 36 races. In 2021, Hendrick Motorsports eclipsed Petty Enterprises (268) in Cup Series wins for a single organization.

=== Cup Series wins ===
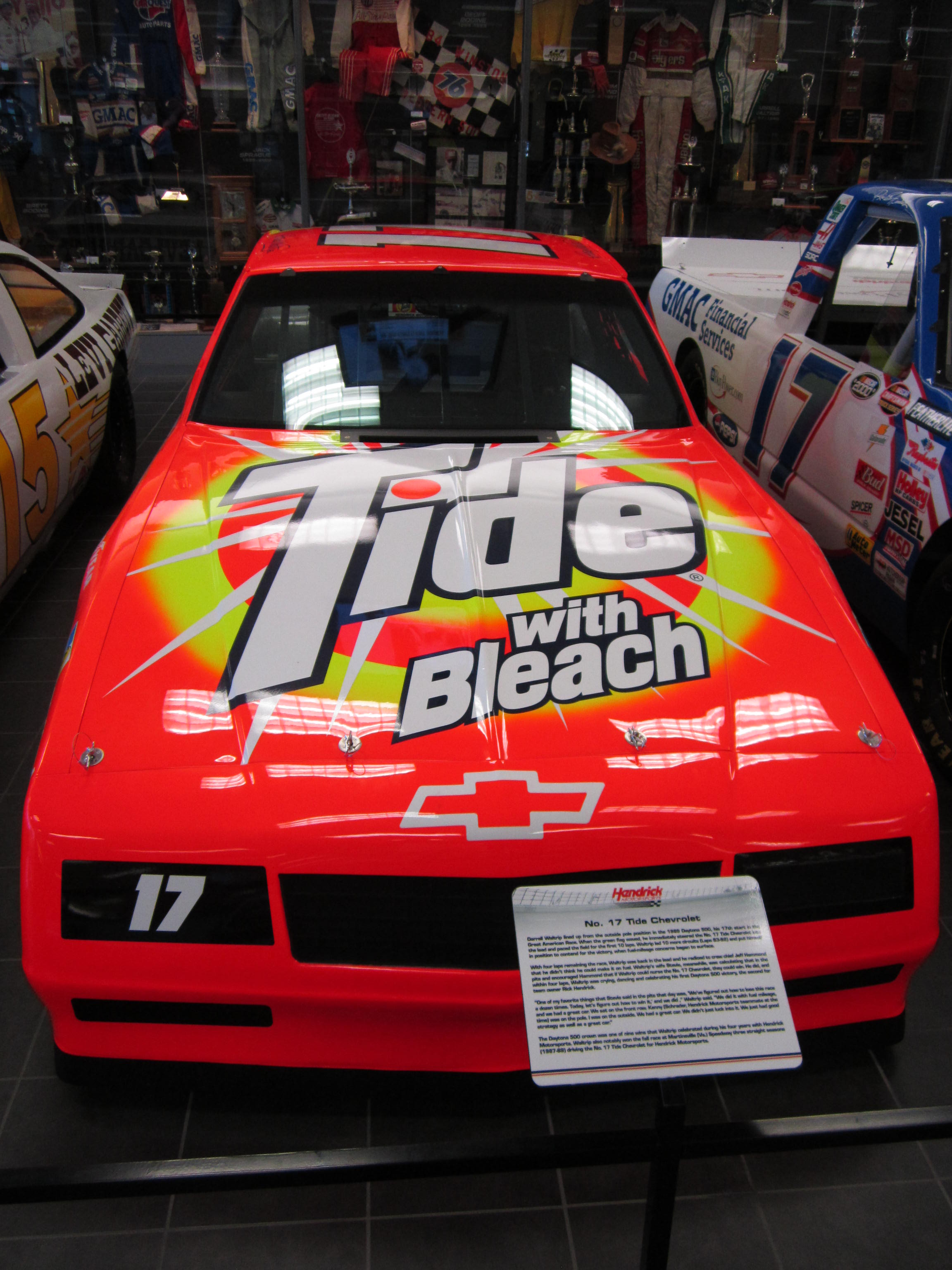
Darrell Waltrip (Daytona, 1989)

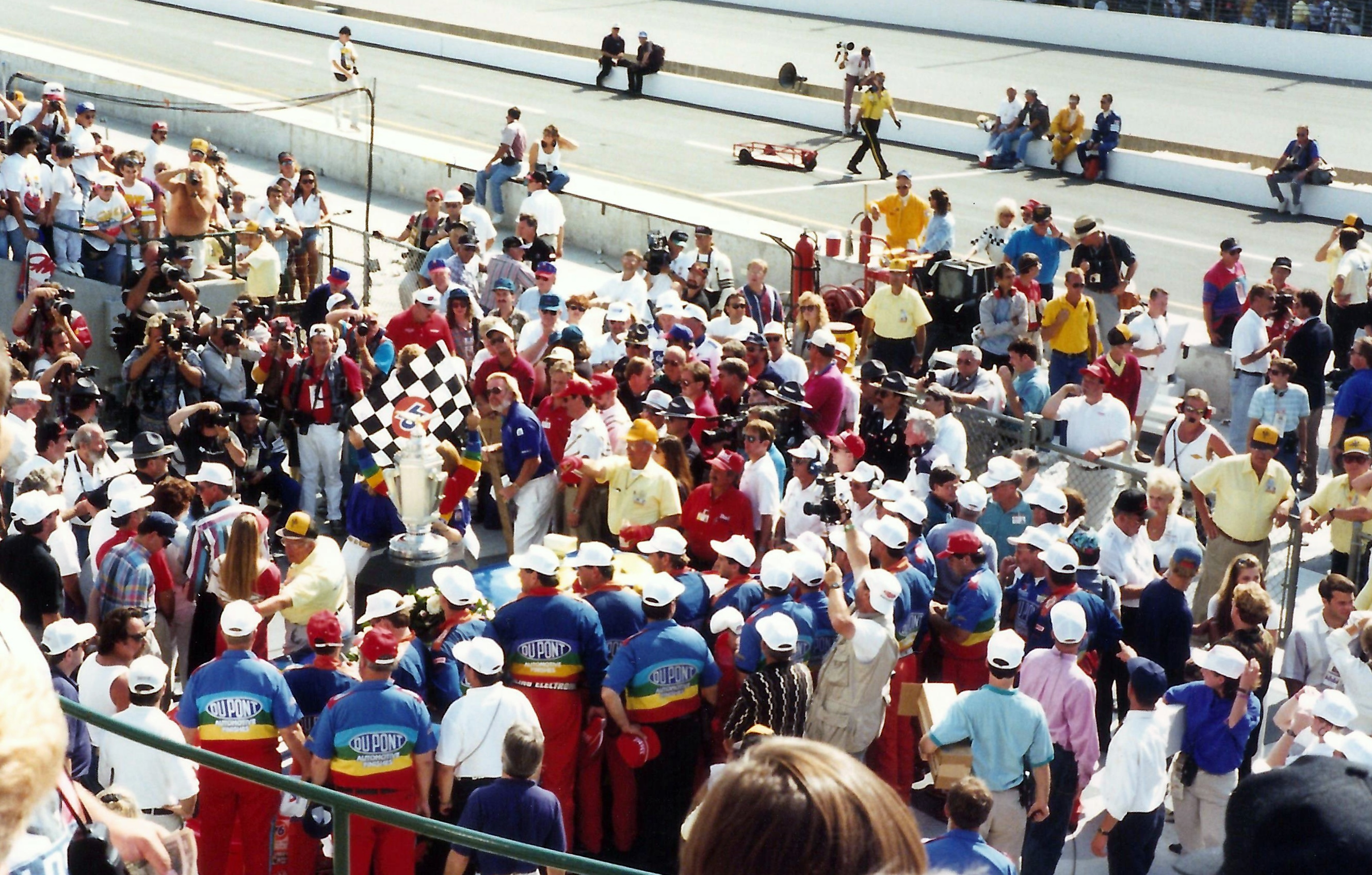
Jeff Gordon in Victory Lane with his team at the 1994 Brickyard 400.

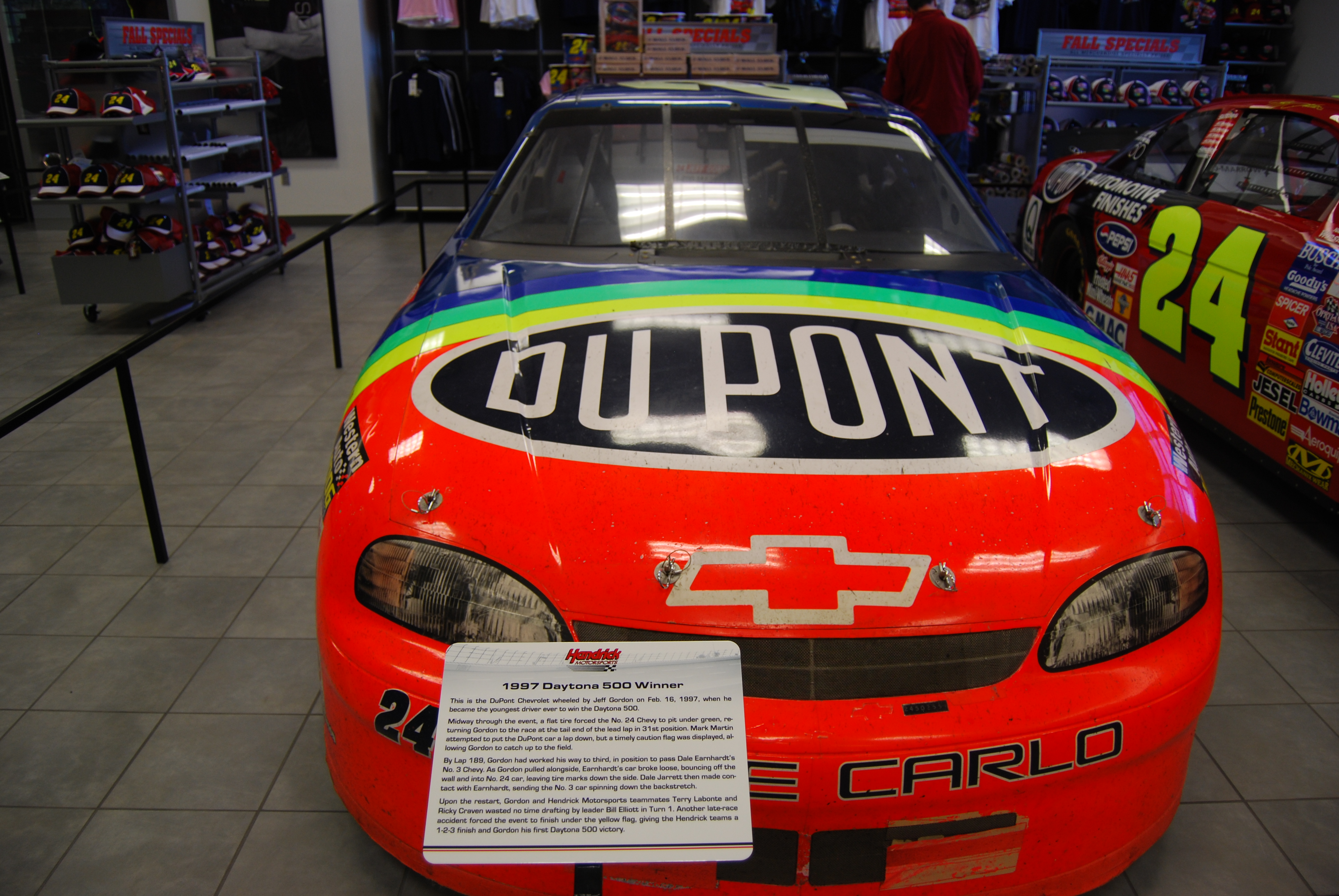
Jeff Gordon (Daytona, 1997)

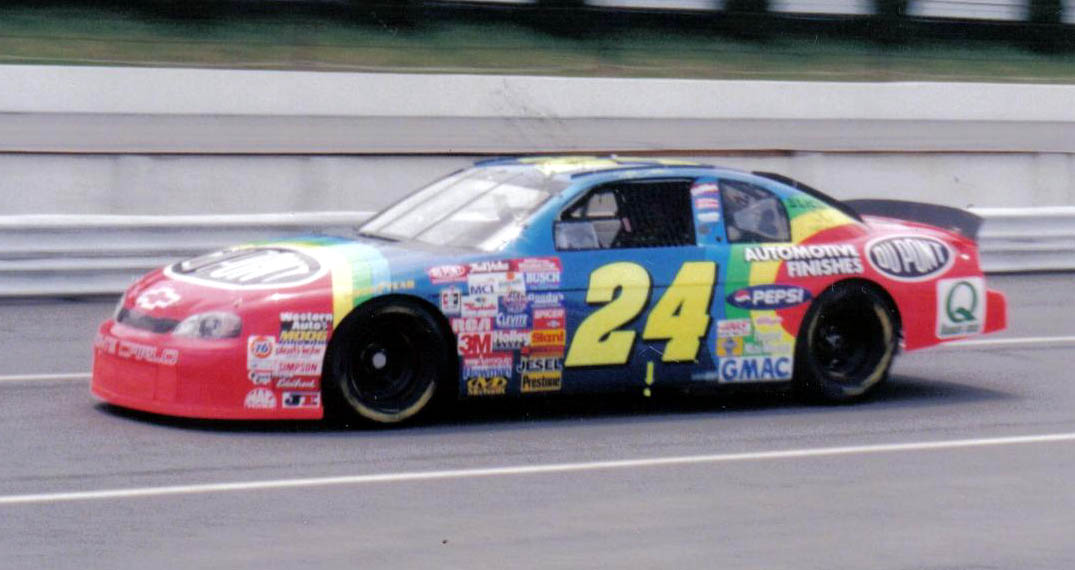
Jeff Gordon (Pocono, 1997)

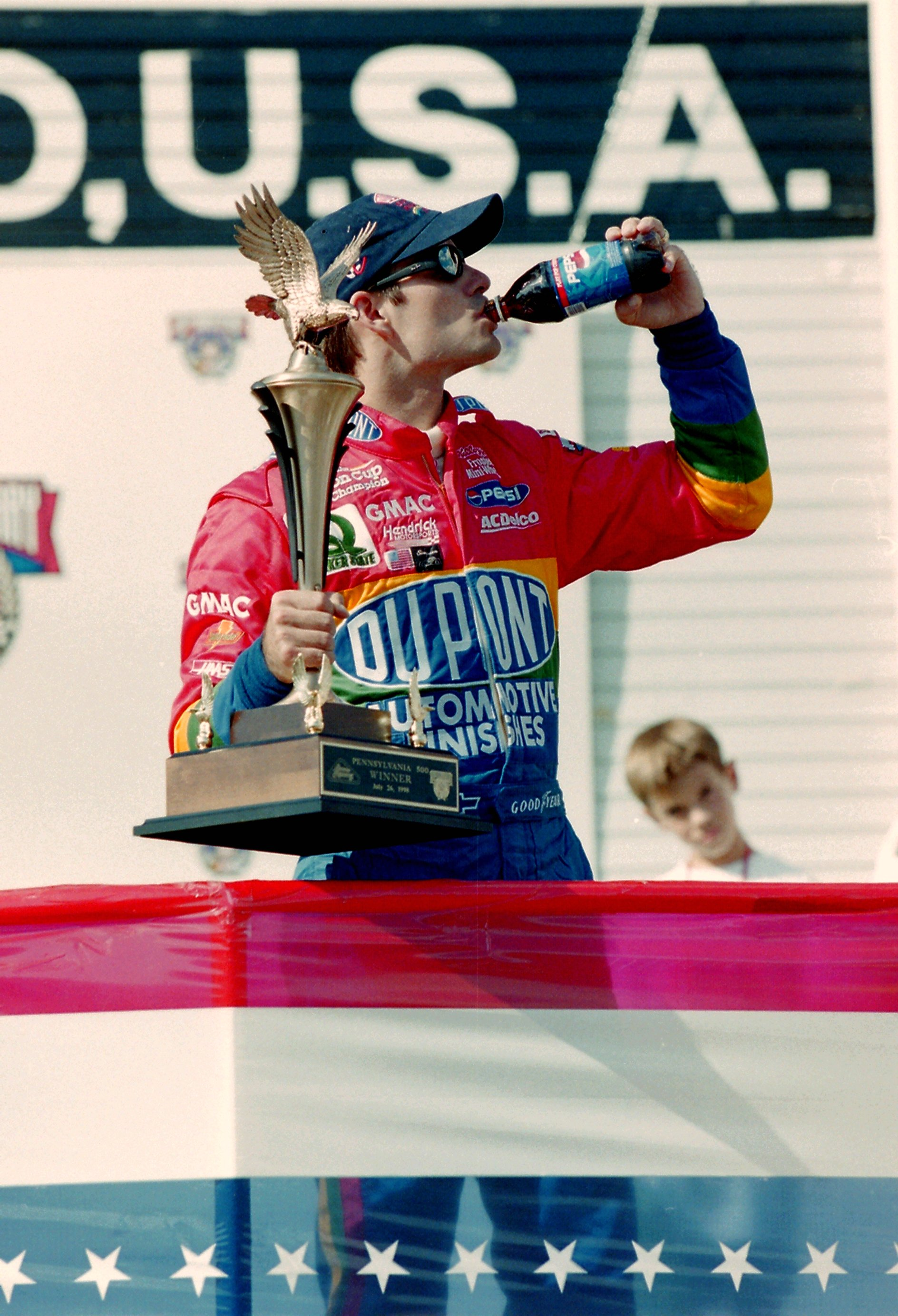
Jeff Gordon (Pocono, 1998)

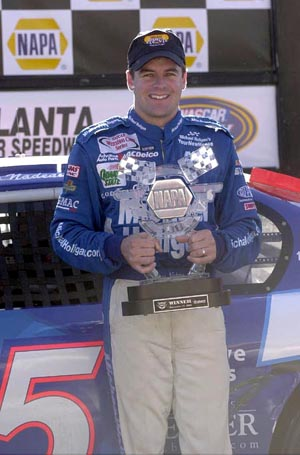
Jerry Nadeau (Atlanta, 2000)

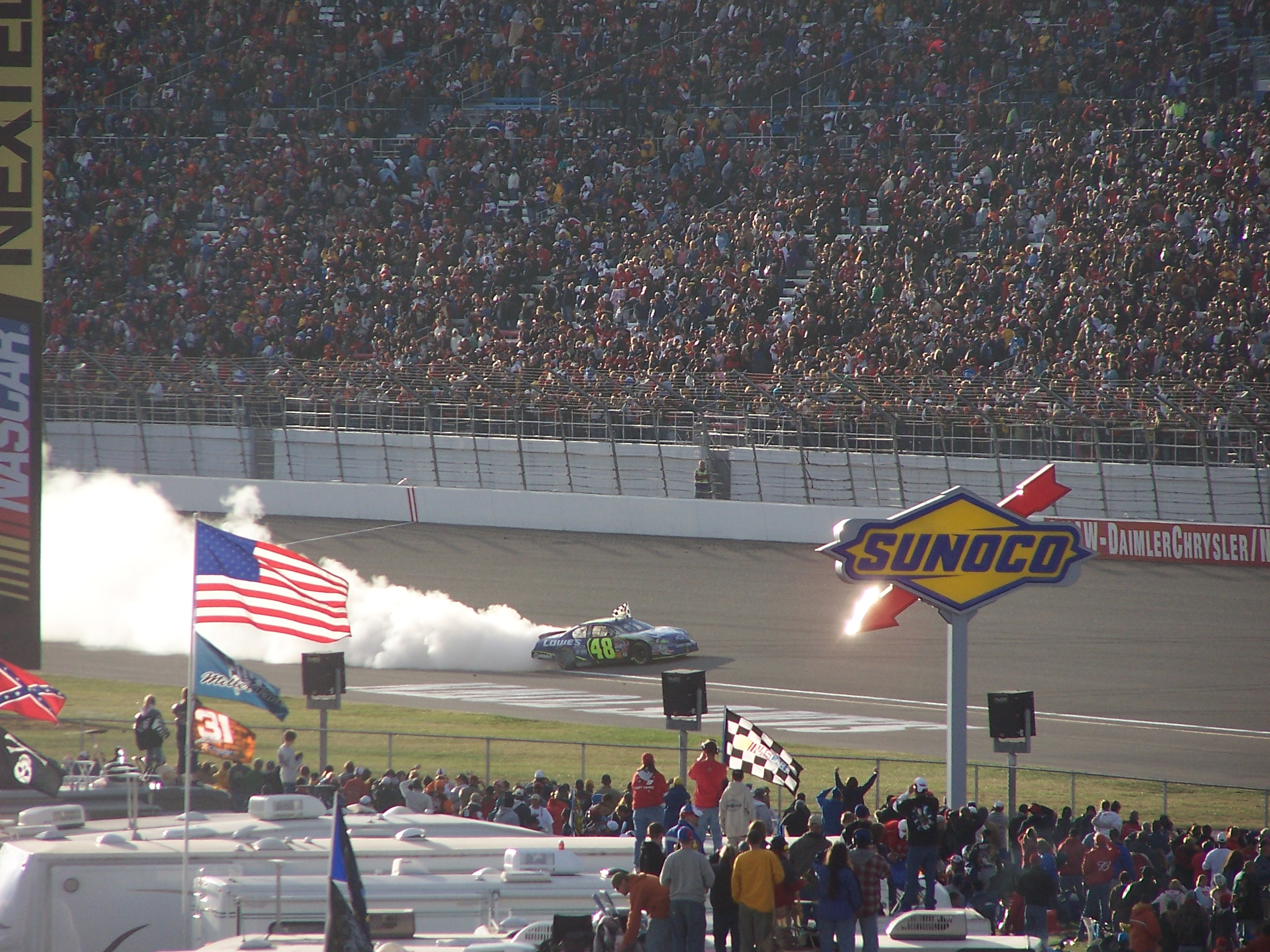
Jimmie Johnson (Las Vegas, 2006)

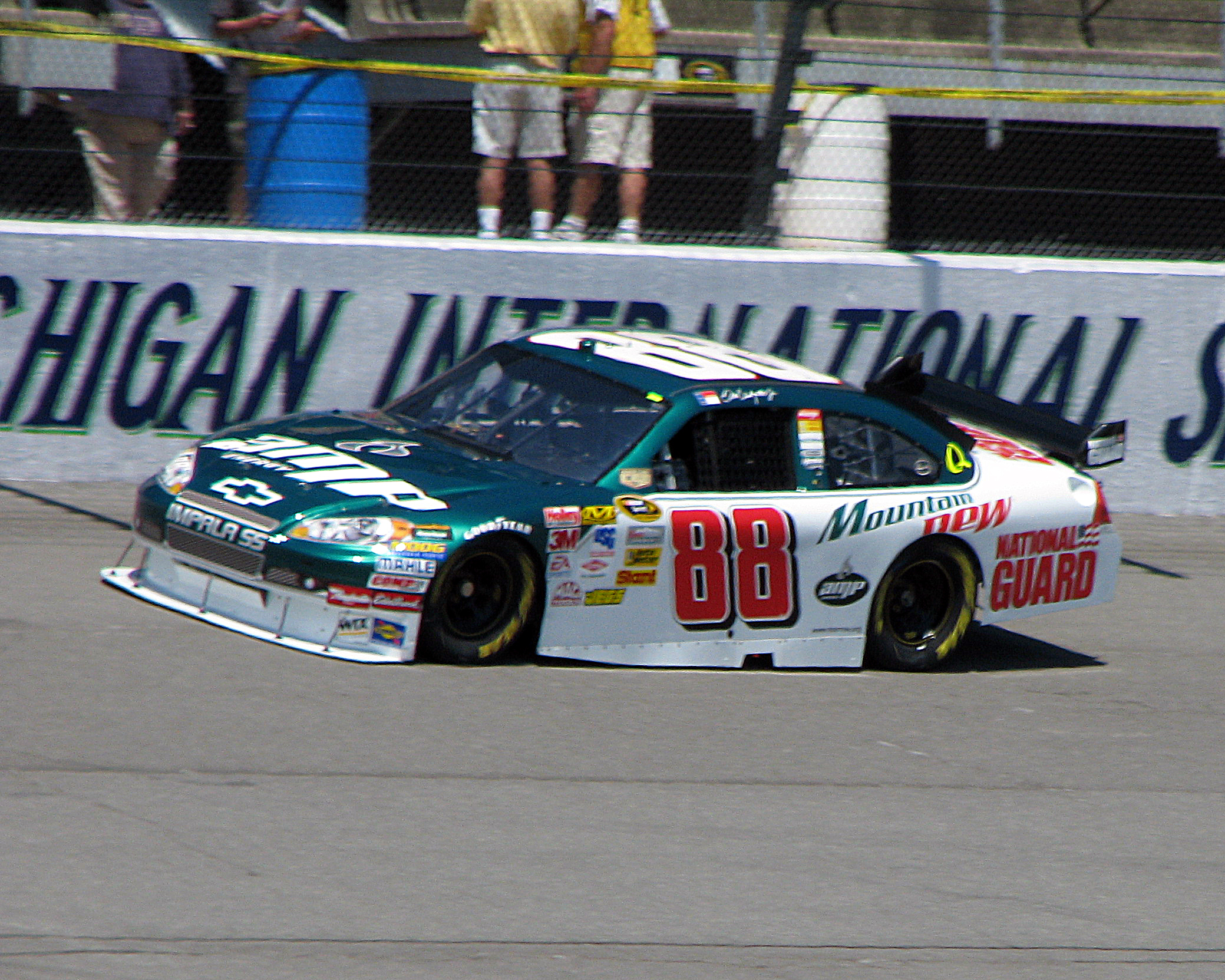
Dale Earnhardt Jr. (Michigan, 2008)

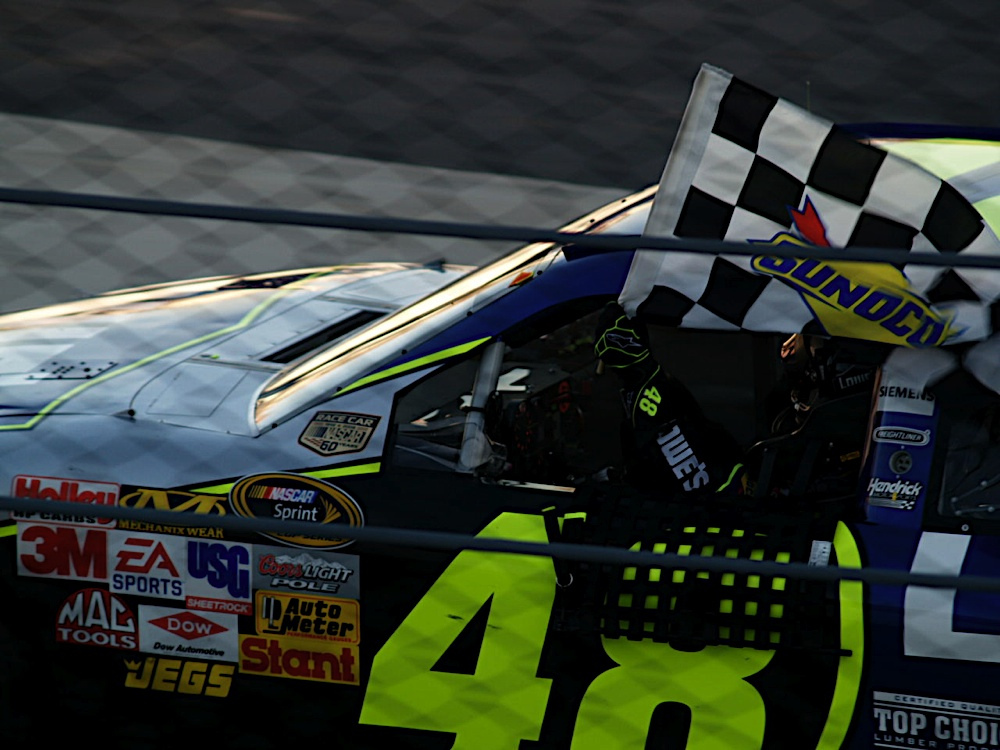
Jimmie Johnson (Martinsville, 2008)

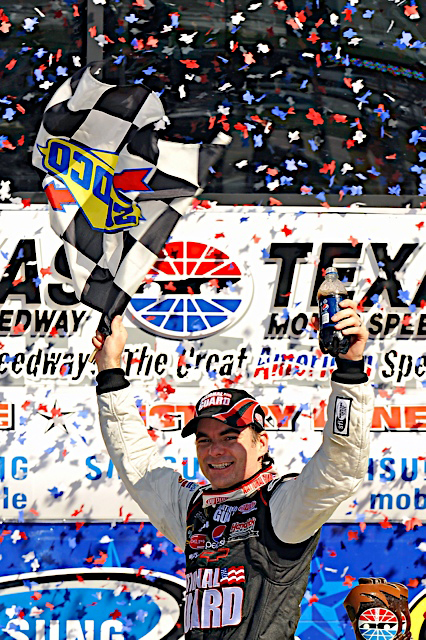
Jeff Gordon (Texas, 2009)

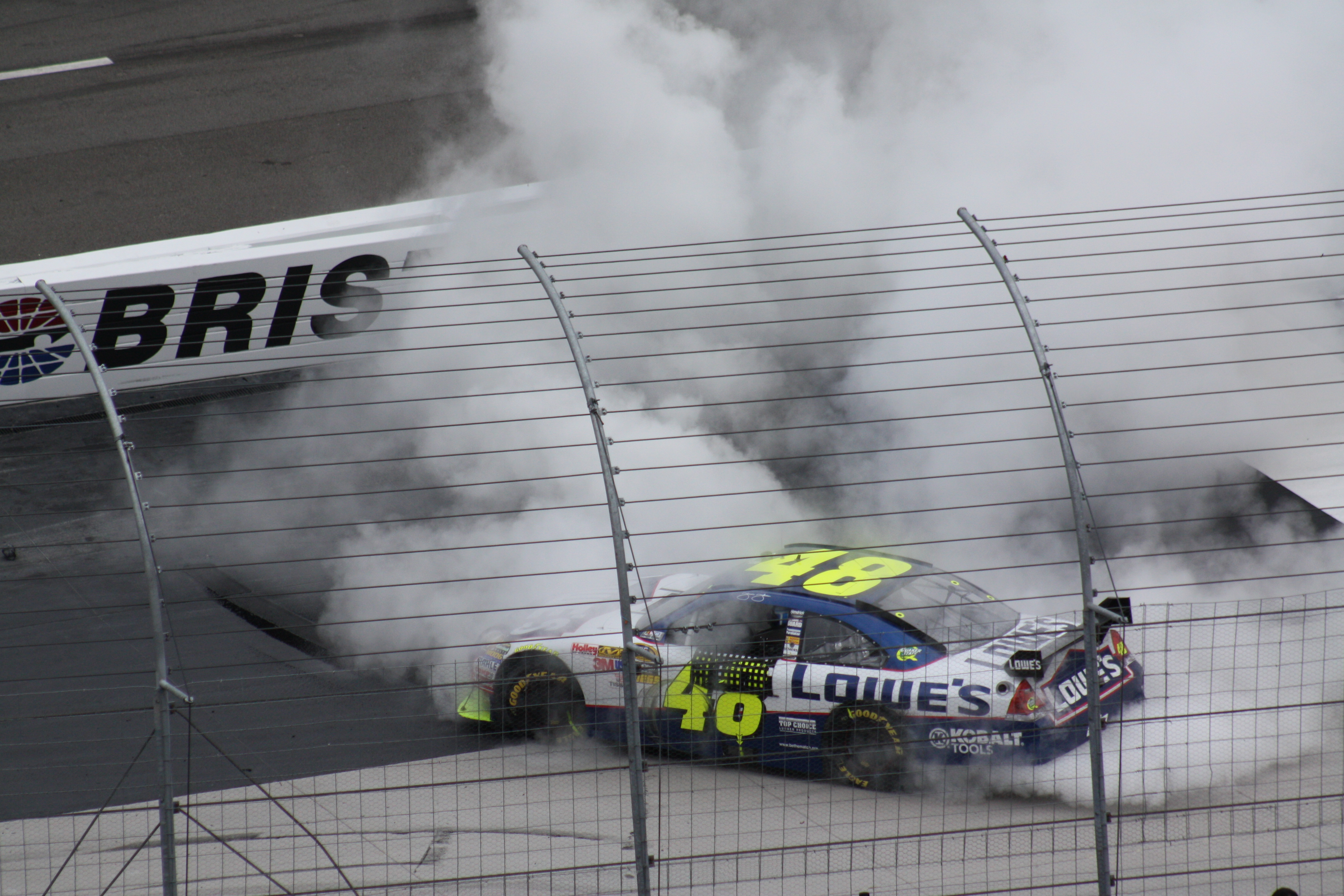
Jimmie Johnson (Bristol, 2010)

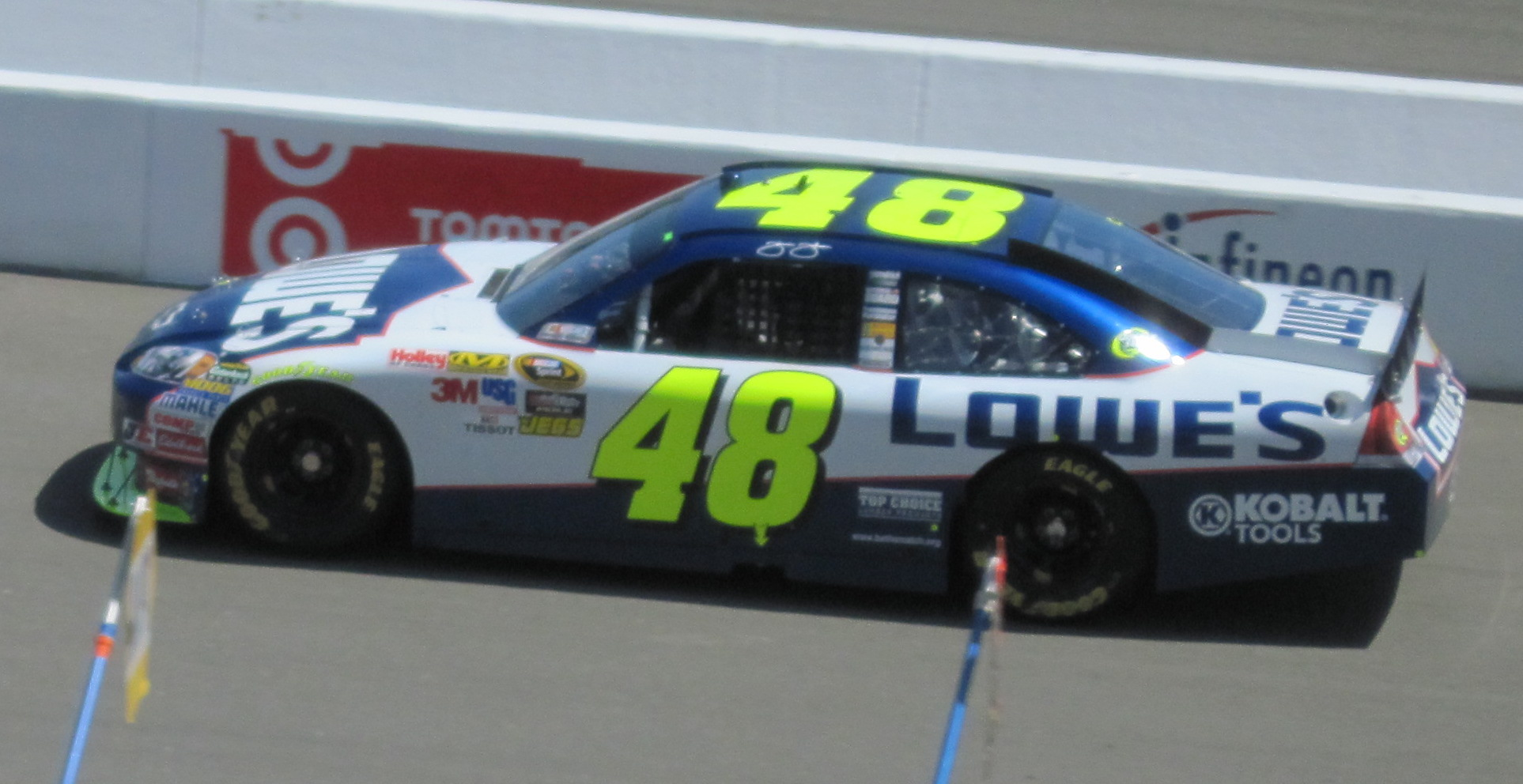
Jimmie Johnson during the 2010 Toyota/Save Mart 350, the only road course win of his career.

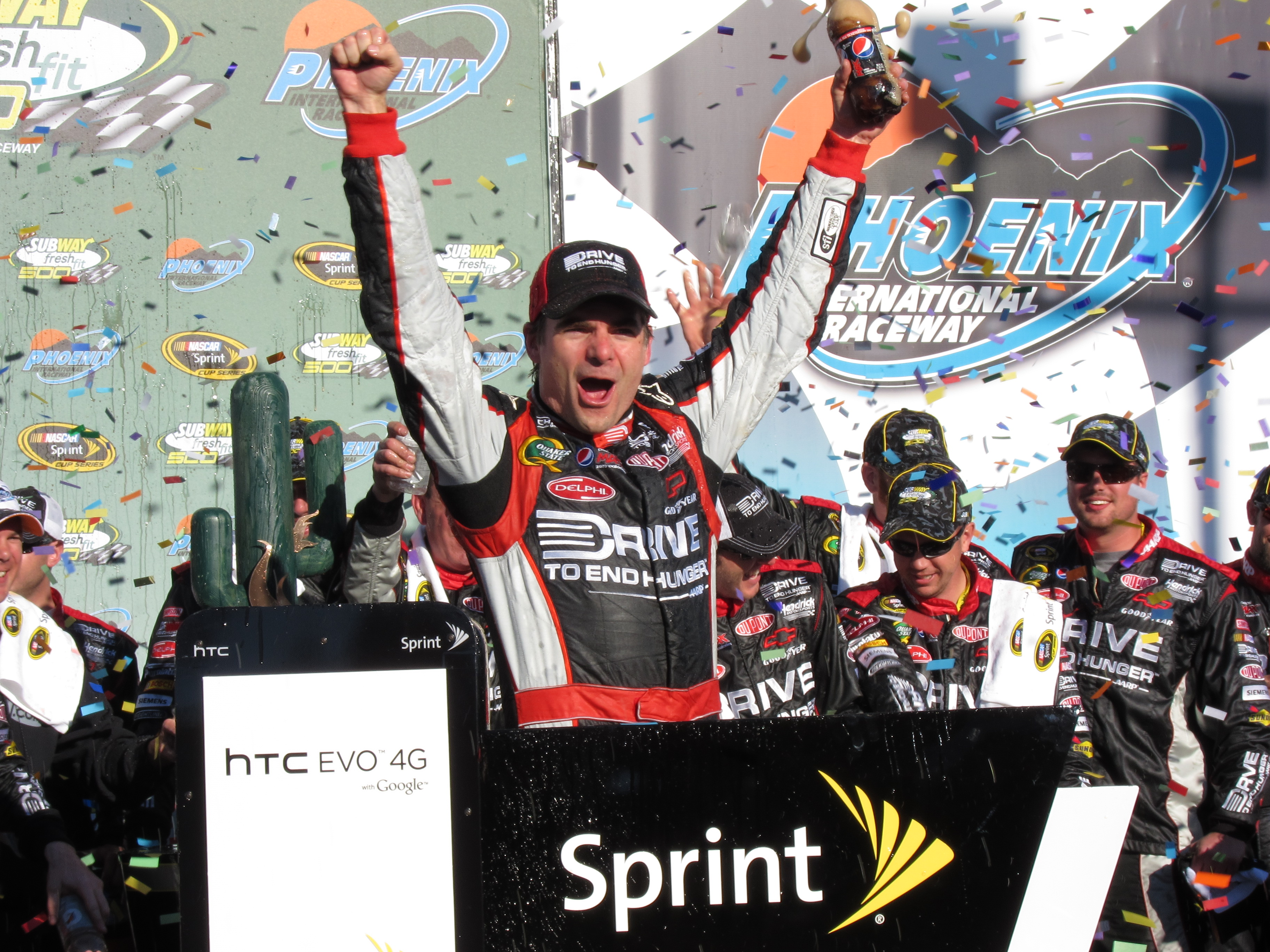
Jeff Gordon (Phoenix, 2011)

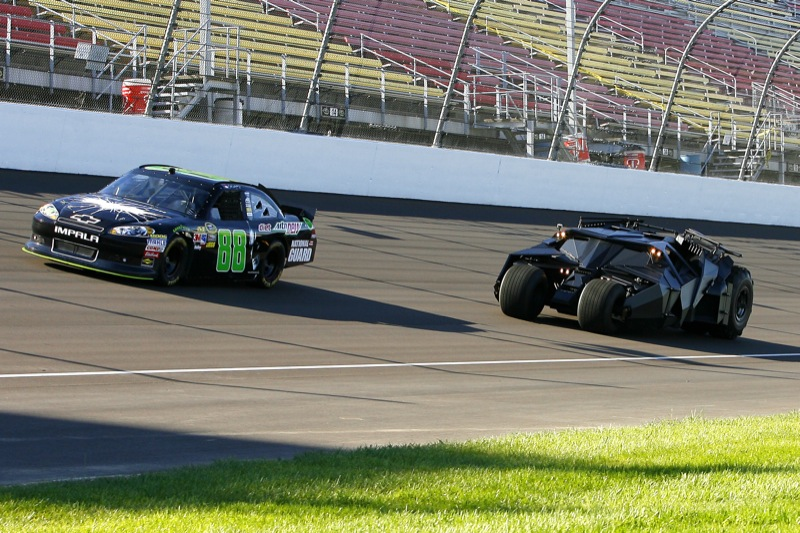
Dale Earnhardt Jr. (Michigan, 2012)

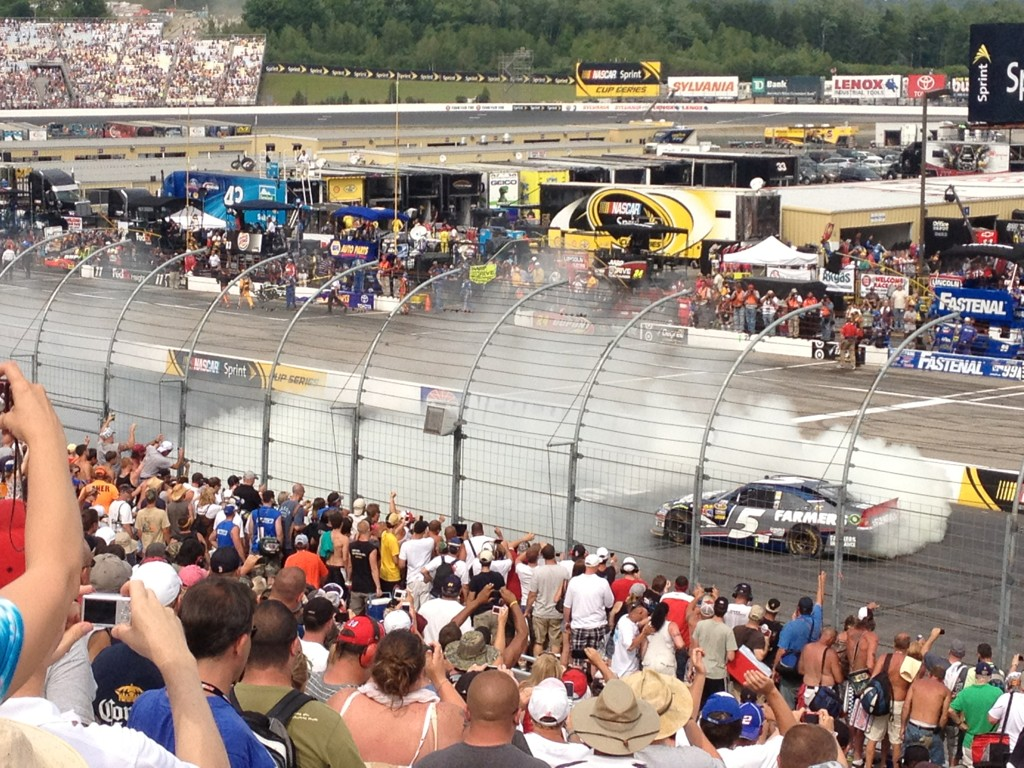
Kasey Kahne (New Hampshire, 2012)

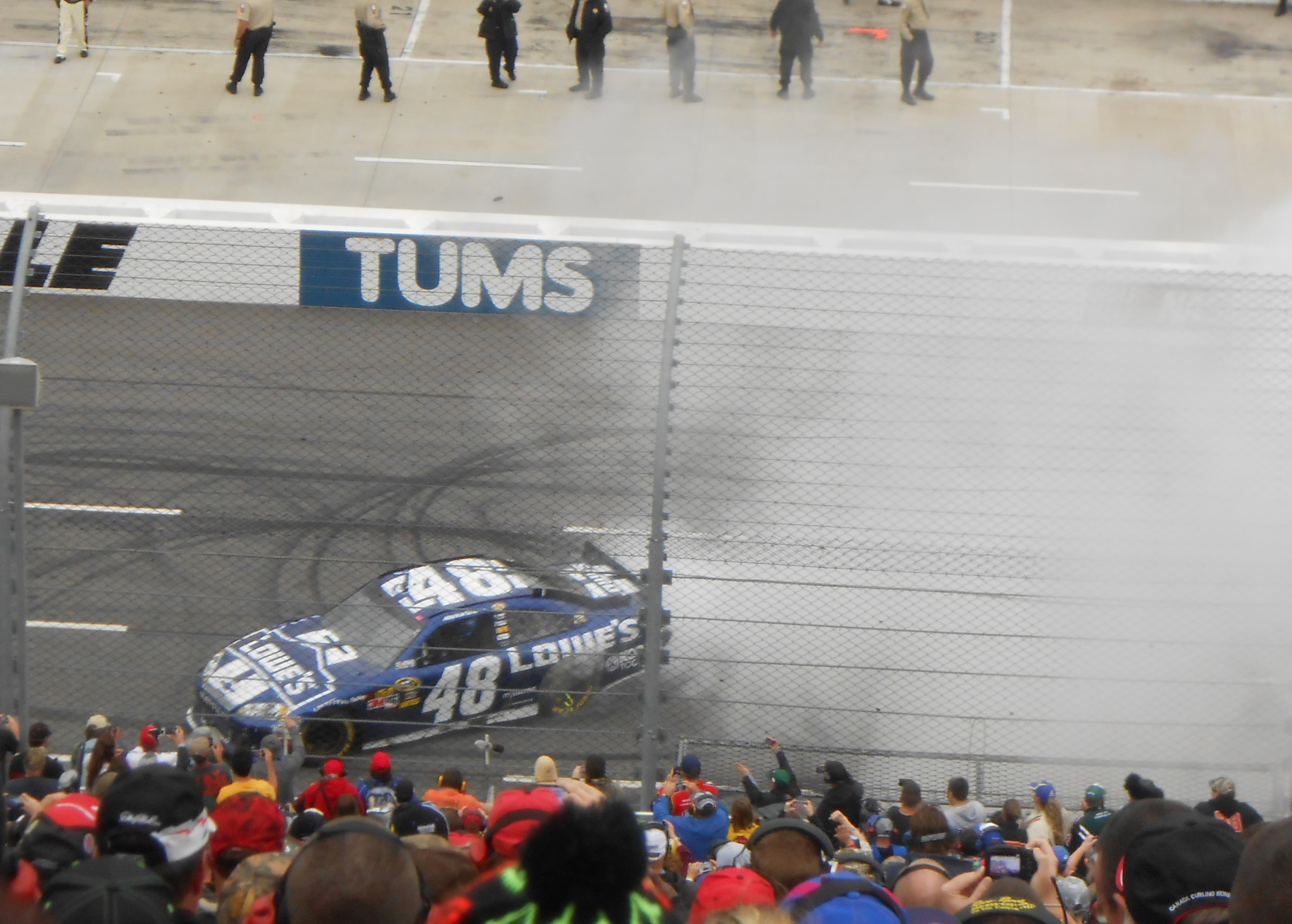
Jimmie Johnson performing a burnout after winning the 2012 Tums Fast Relief 500.

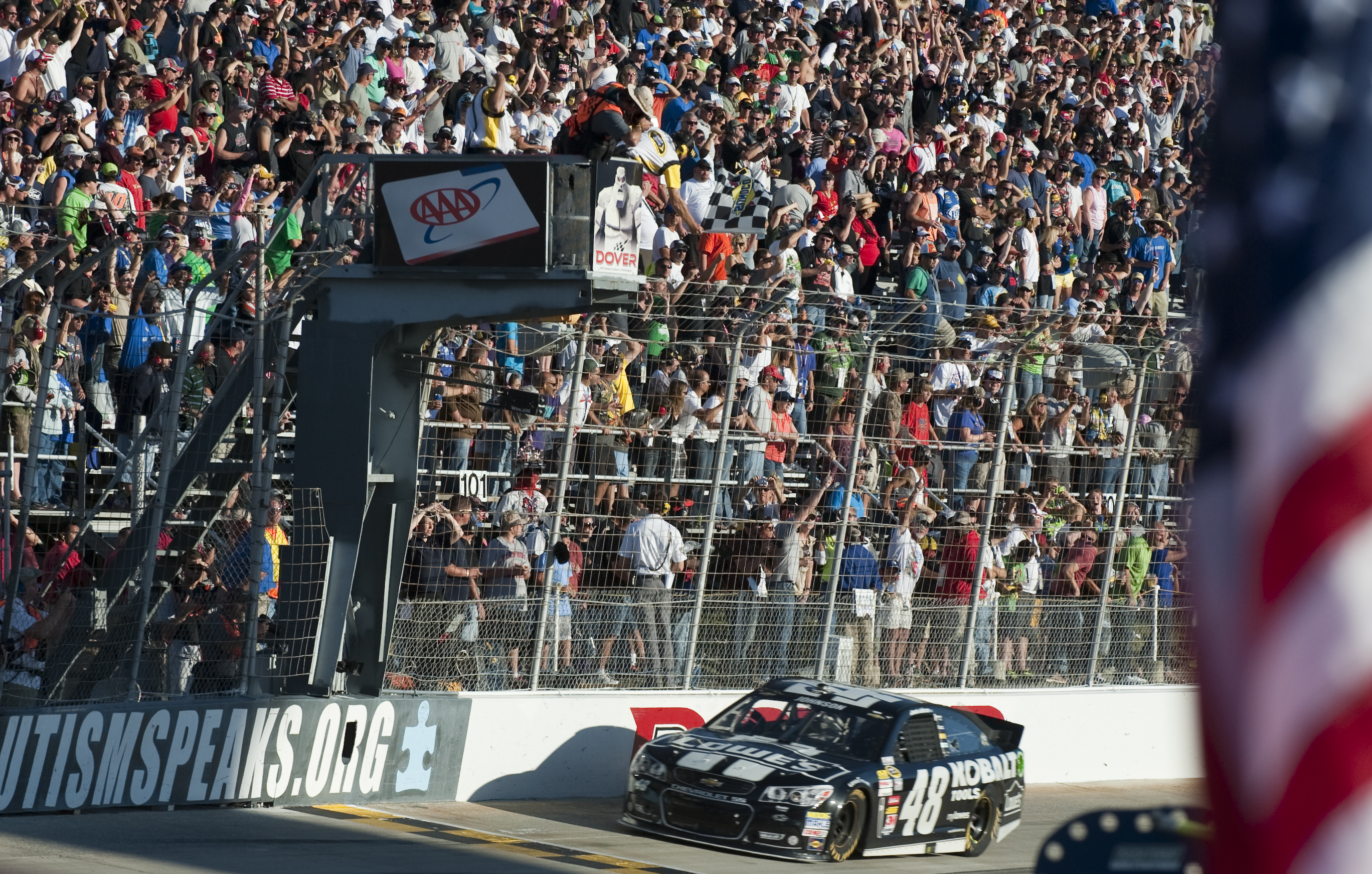
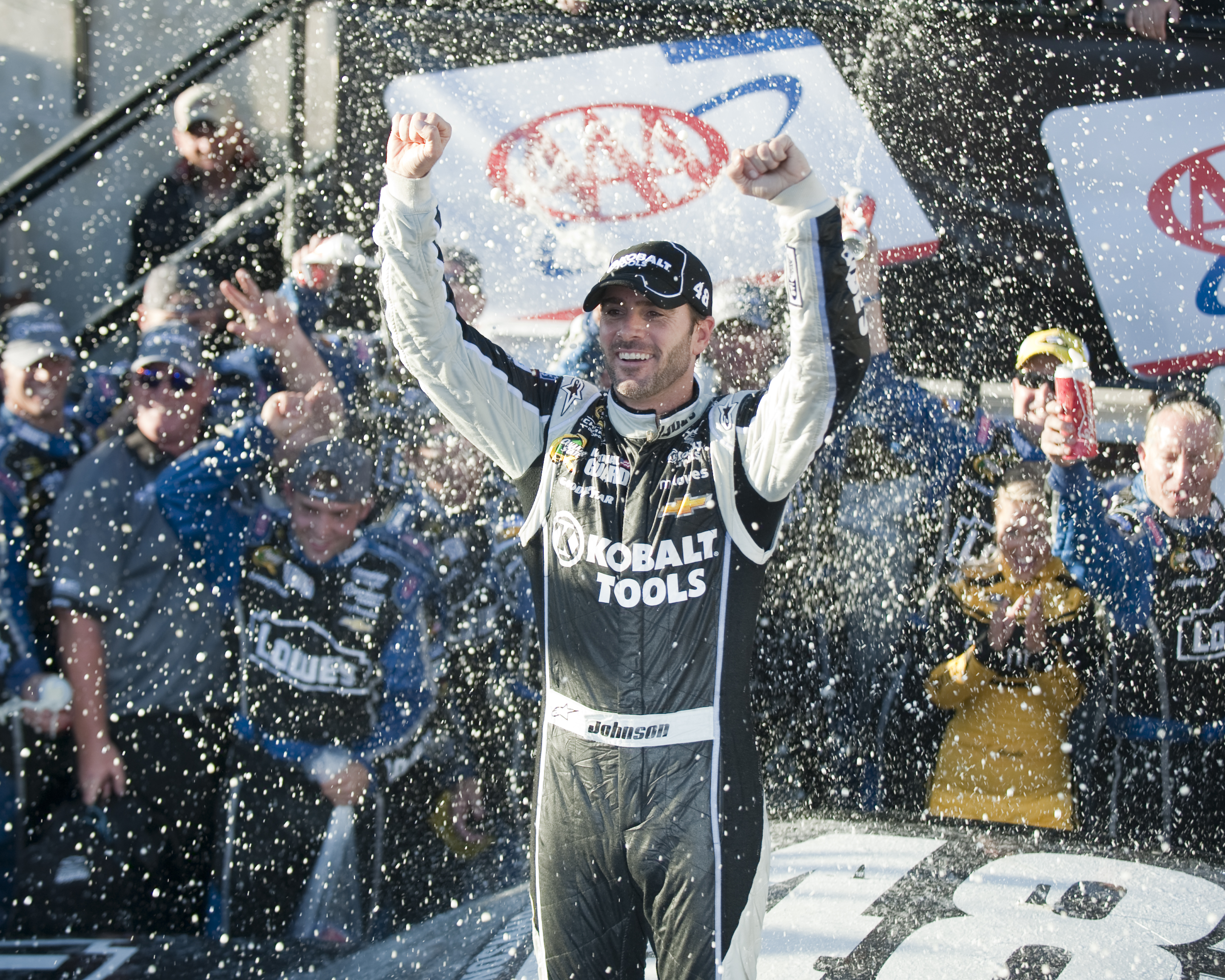
Jimmie Johnson (Dover, 2013)

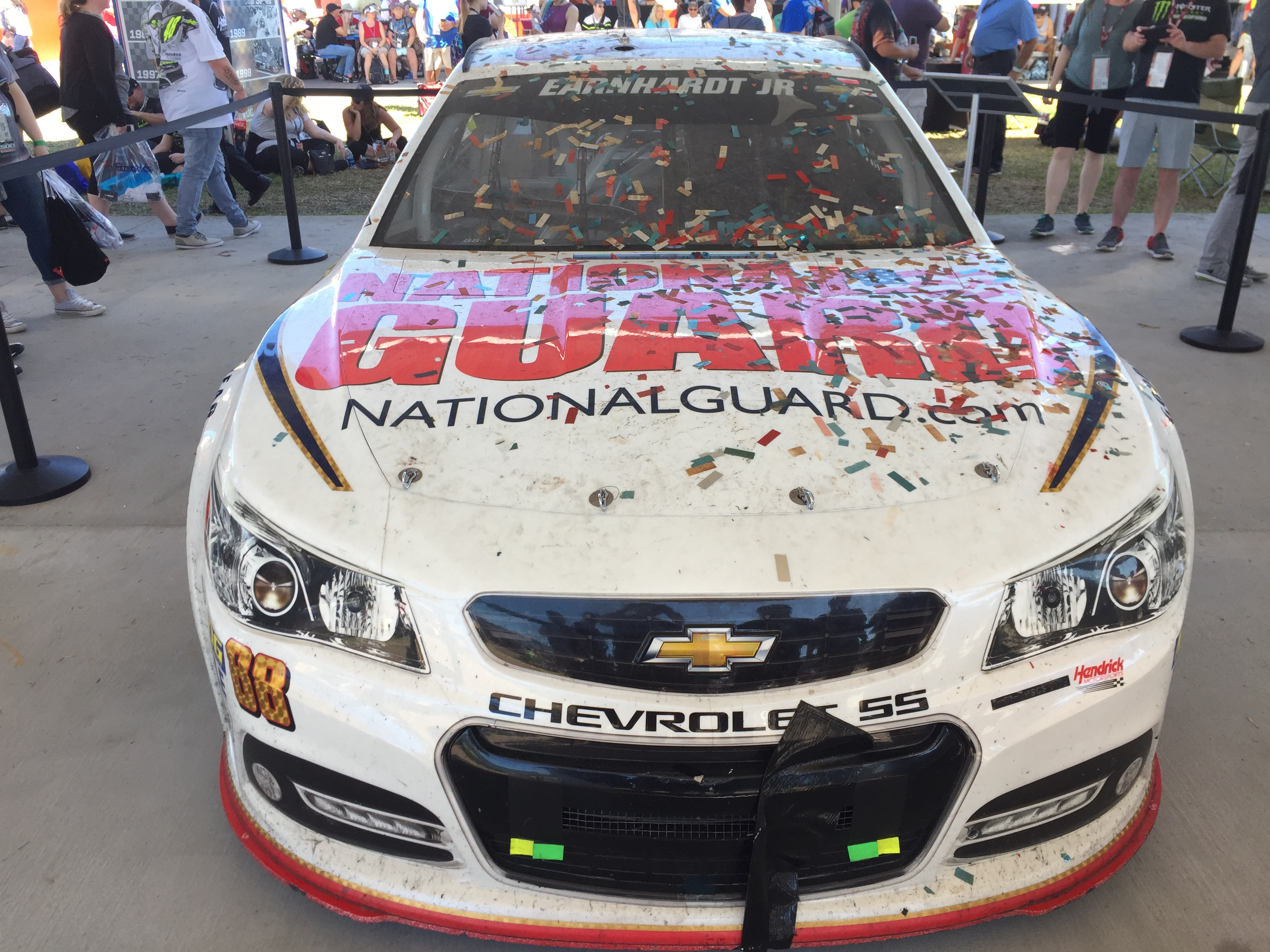
Dale Earnhardt Jr. (Daytona, 2014)

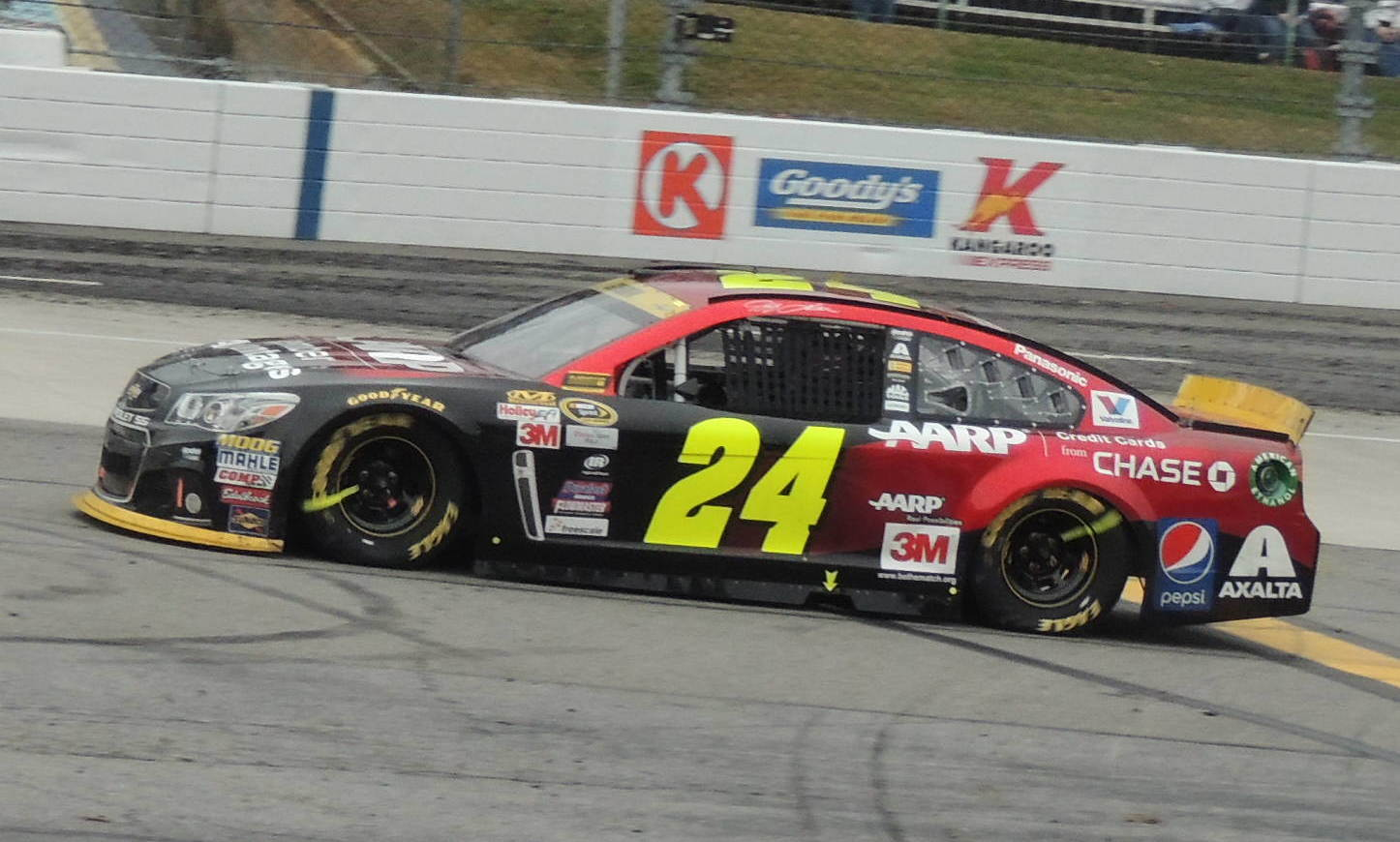
Jeff Gordon (Martinsville, 2015)

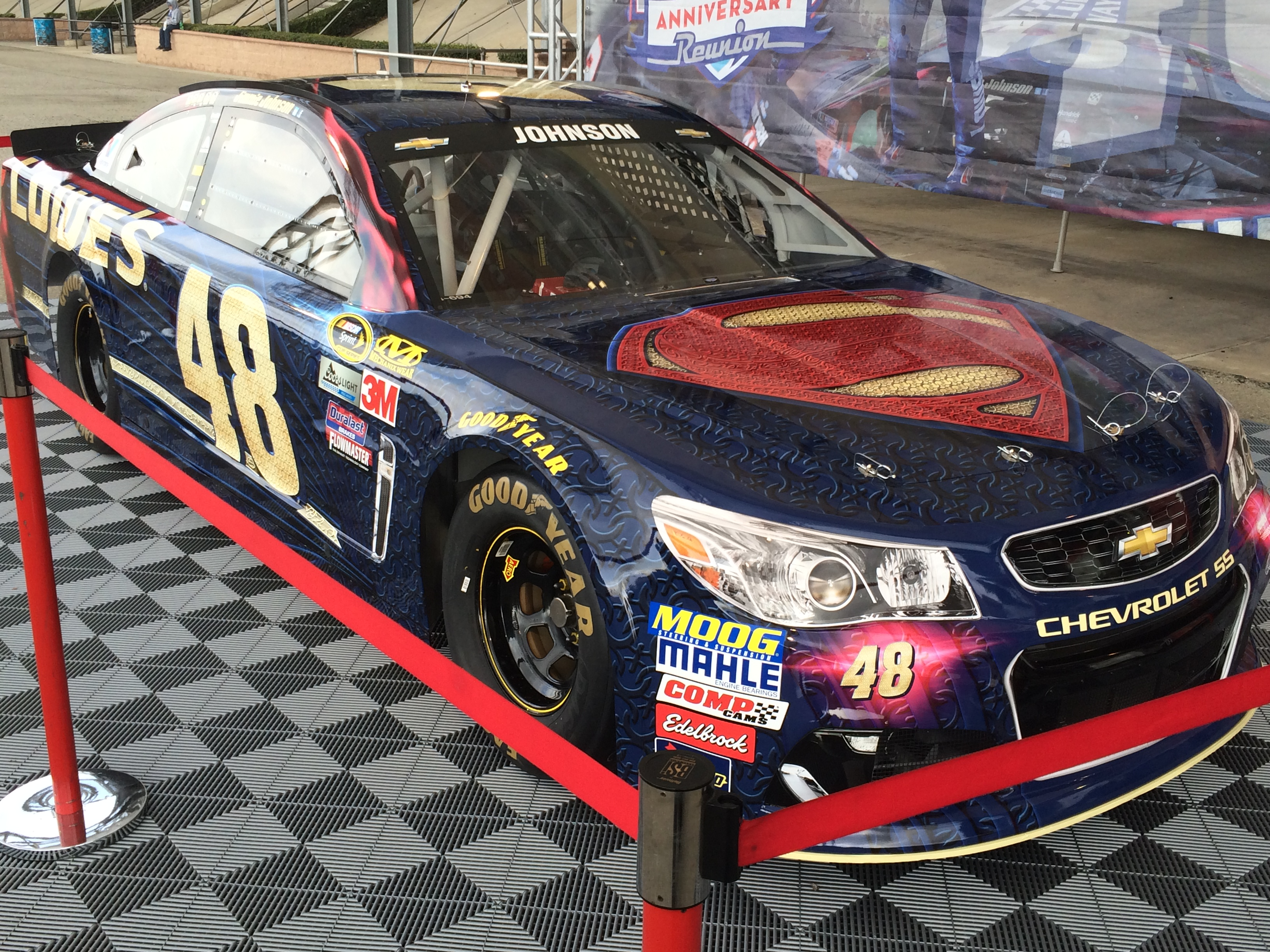
Jimmie Johnson (Fontana, 2016)

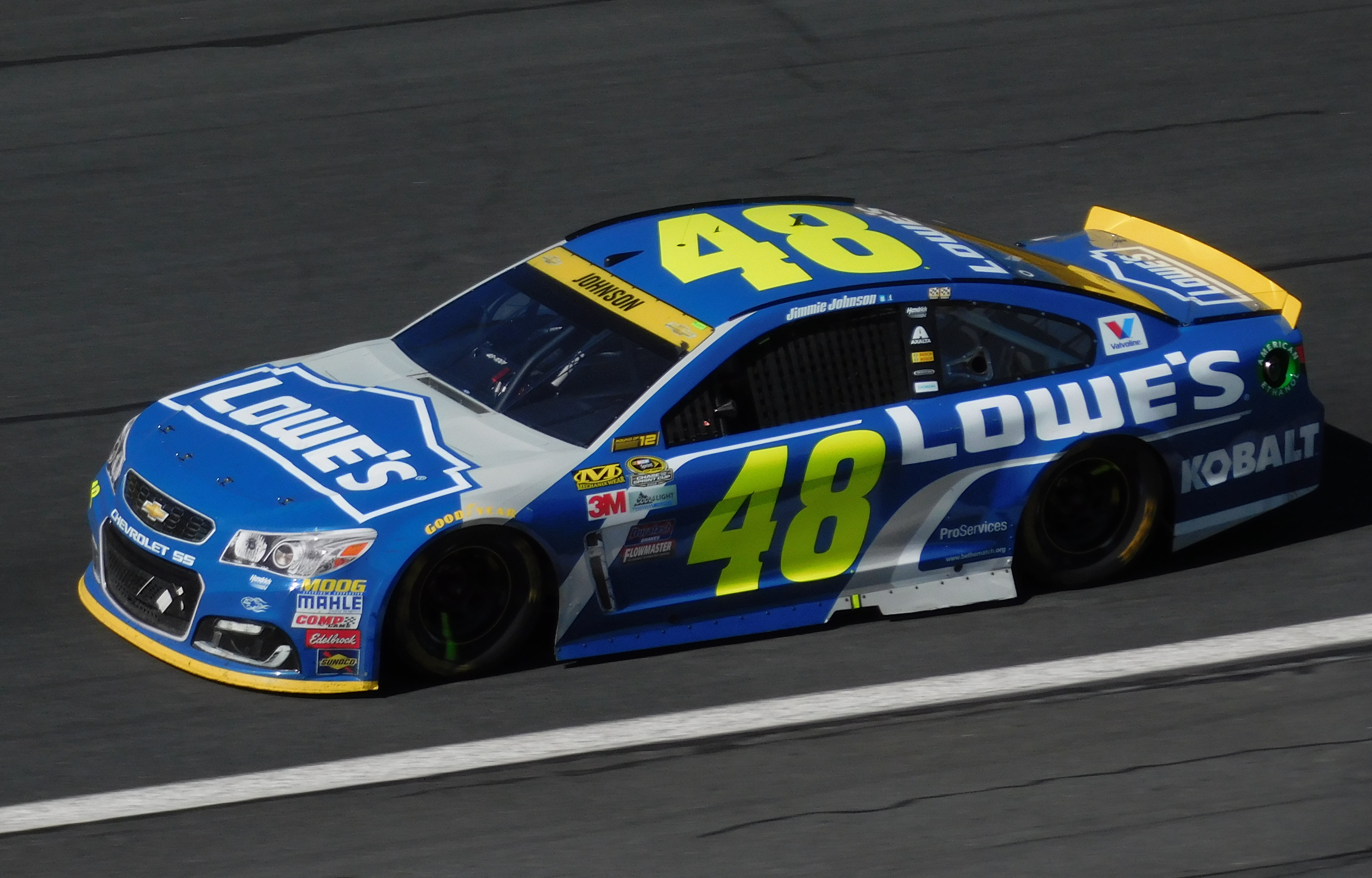
Jimmie Johnson (Charlotte, 2016)

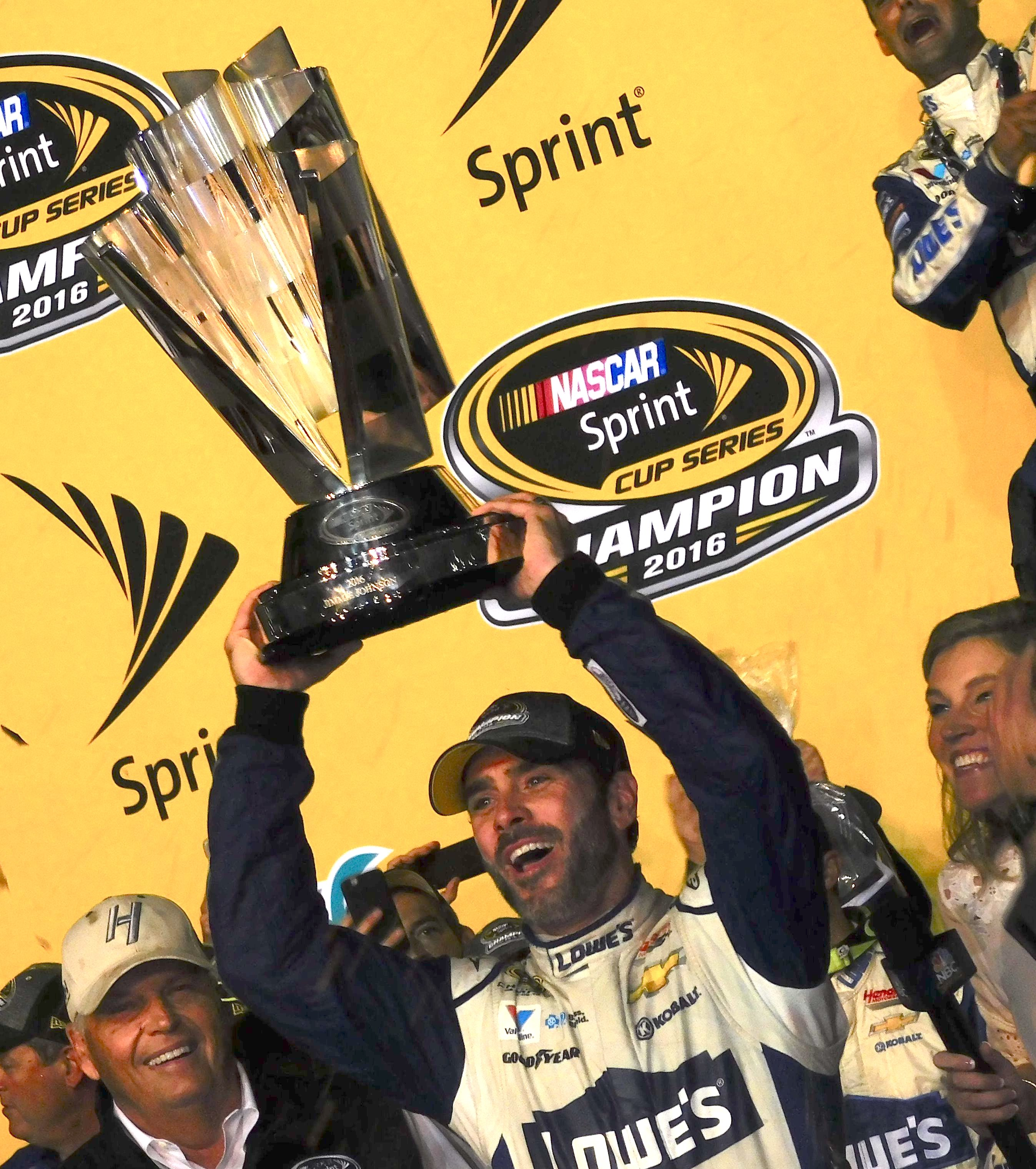
Jimmie Johnson holding the Sprint Cup trophy after clinching his seventh Cup Series title with a win in the 2016 Ford EcoBoost 400.

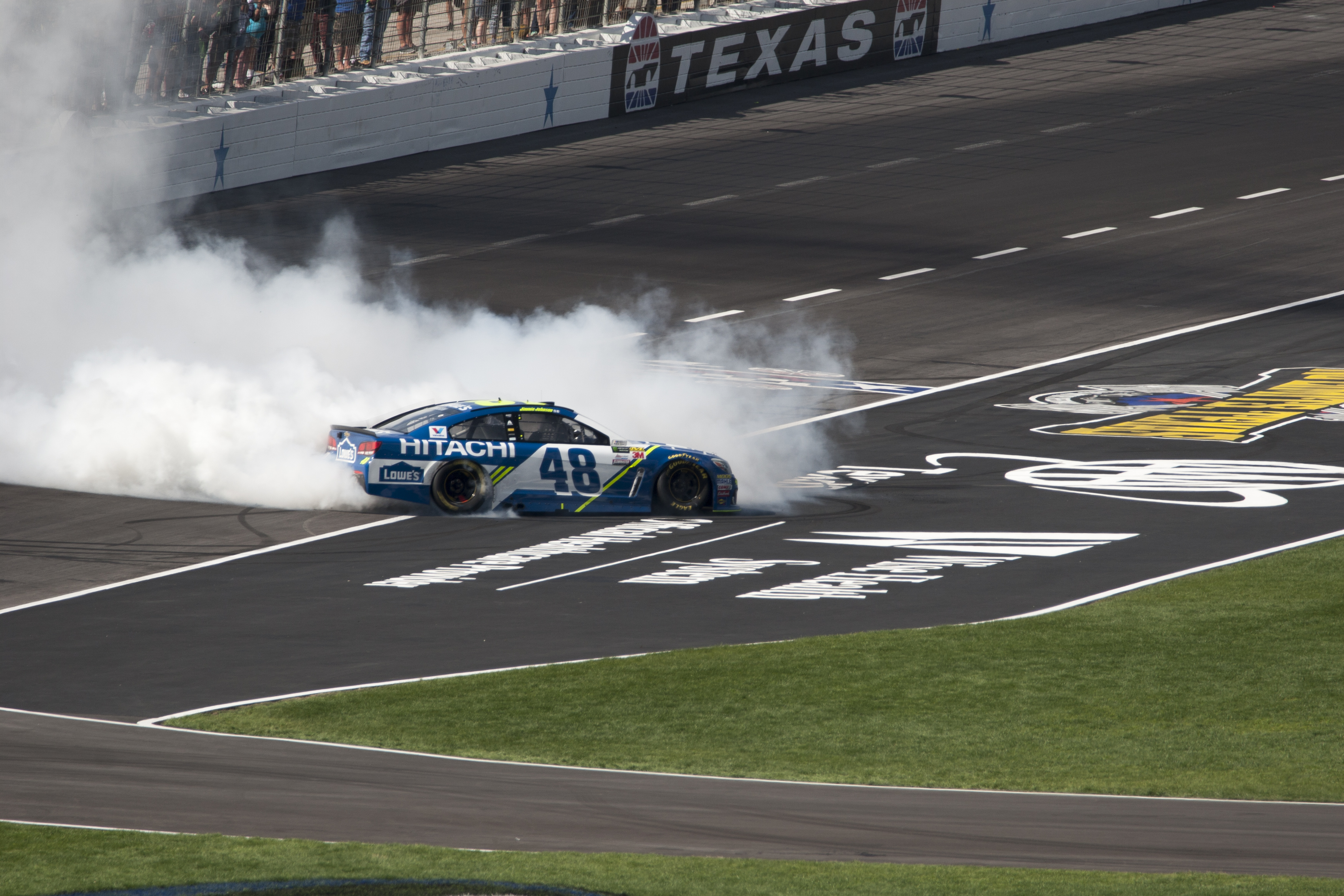
Jimmie Johnson (Texas, 2017)

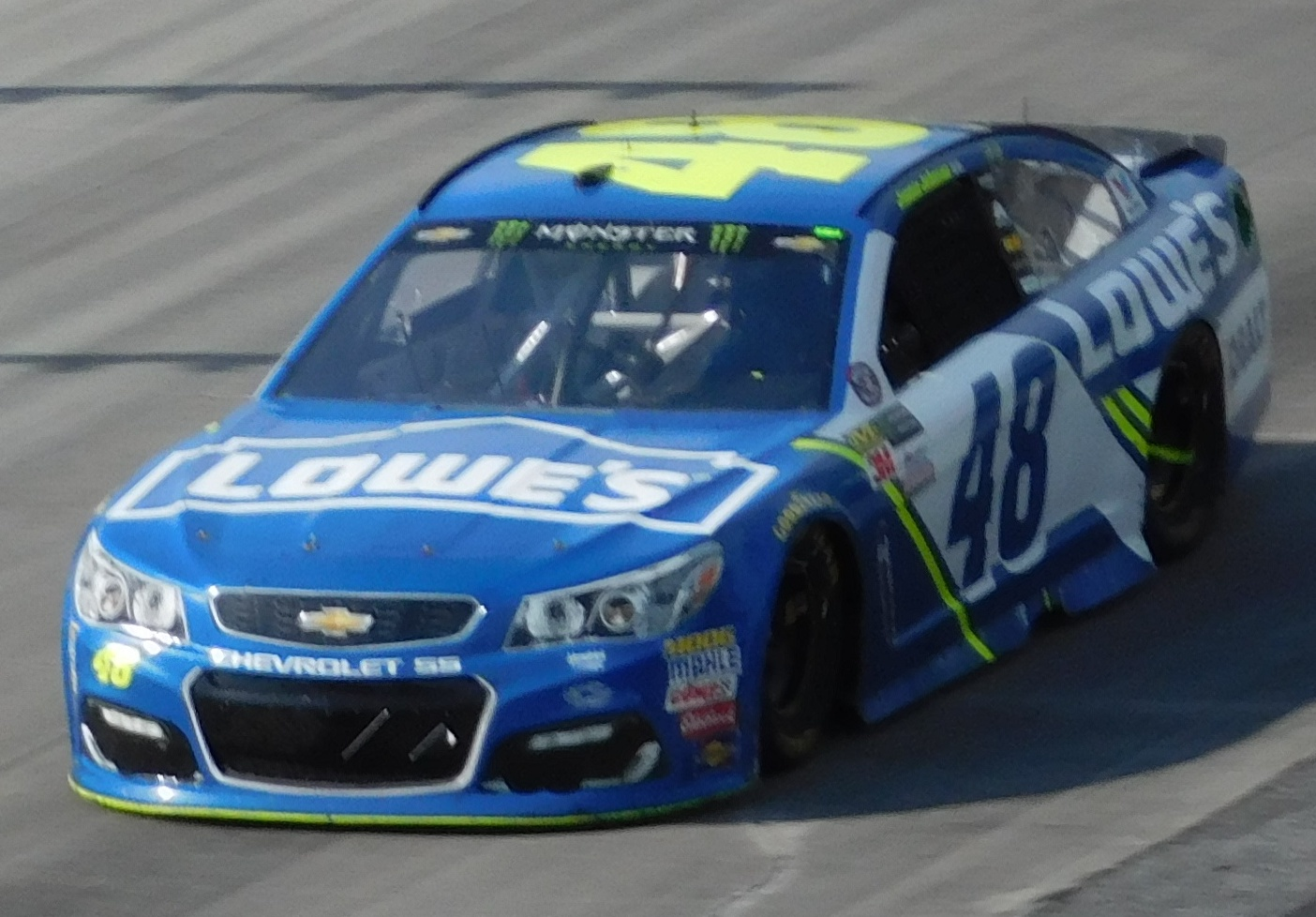
Jimmie Johnson (Dover, 2017)

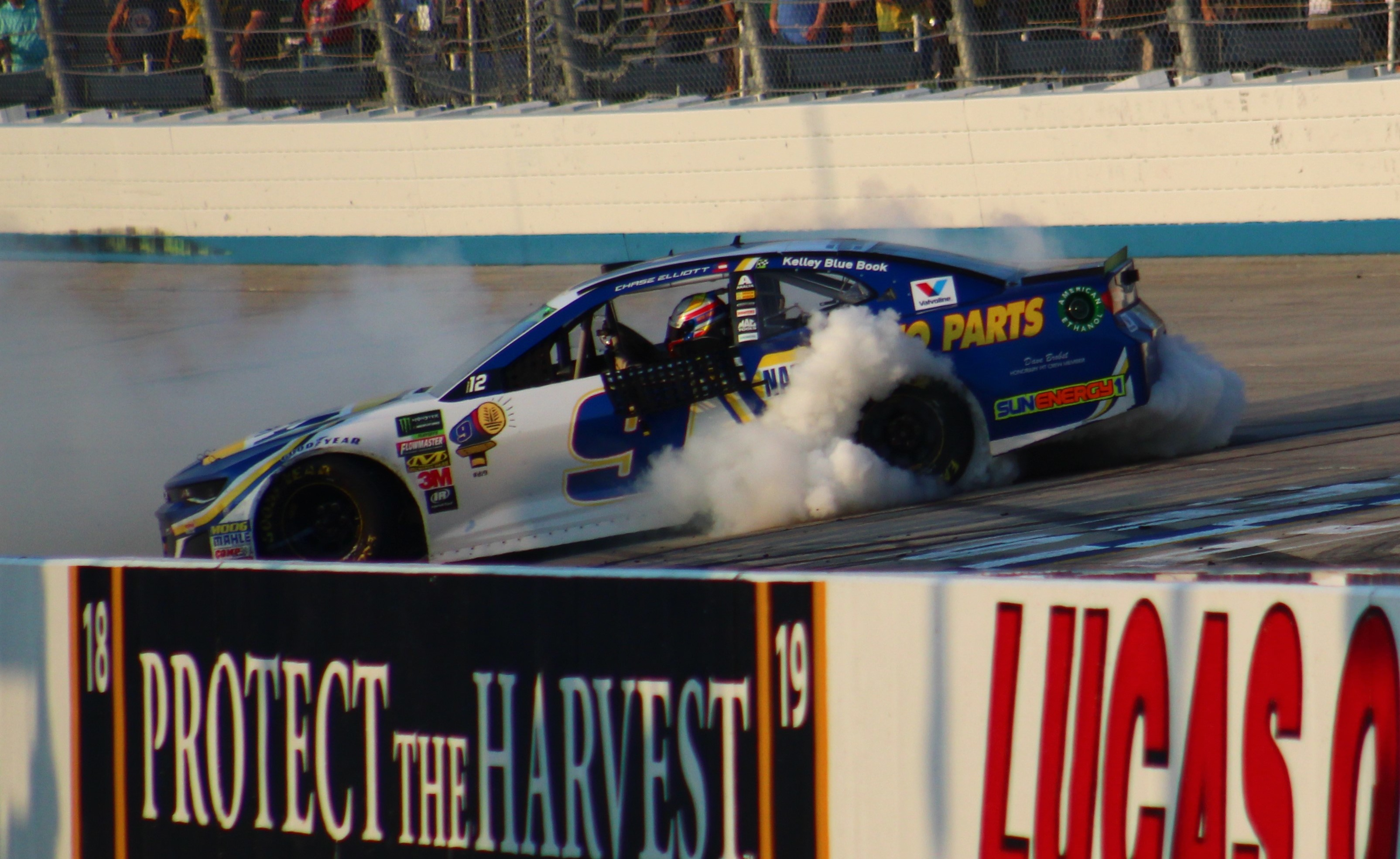
Chase Eliott (Dover, 2018)

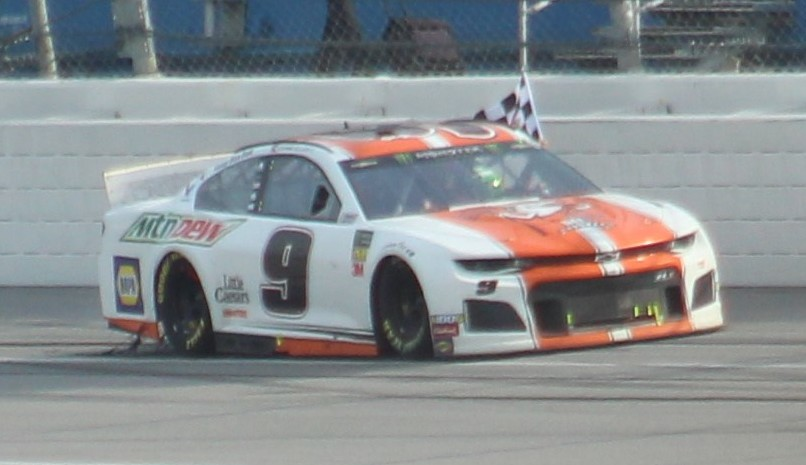
Chase Eliott (Talladega, 2019)

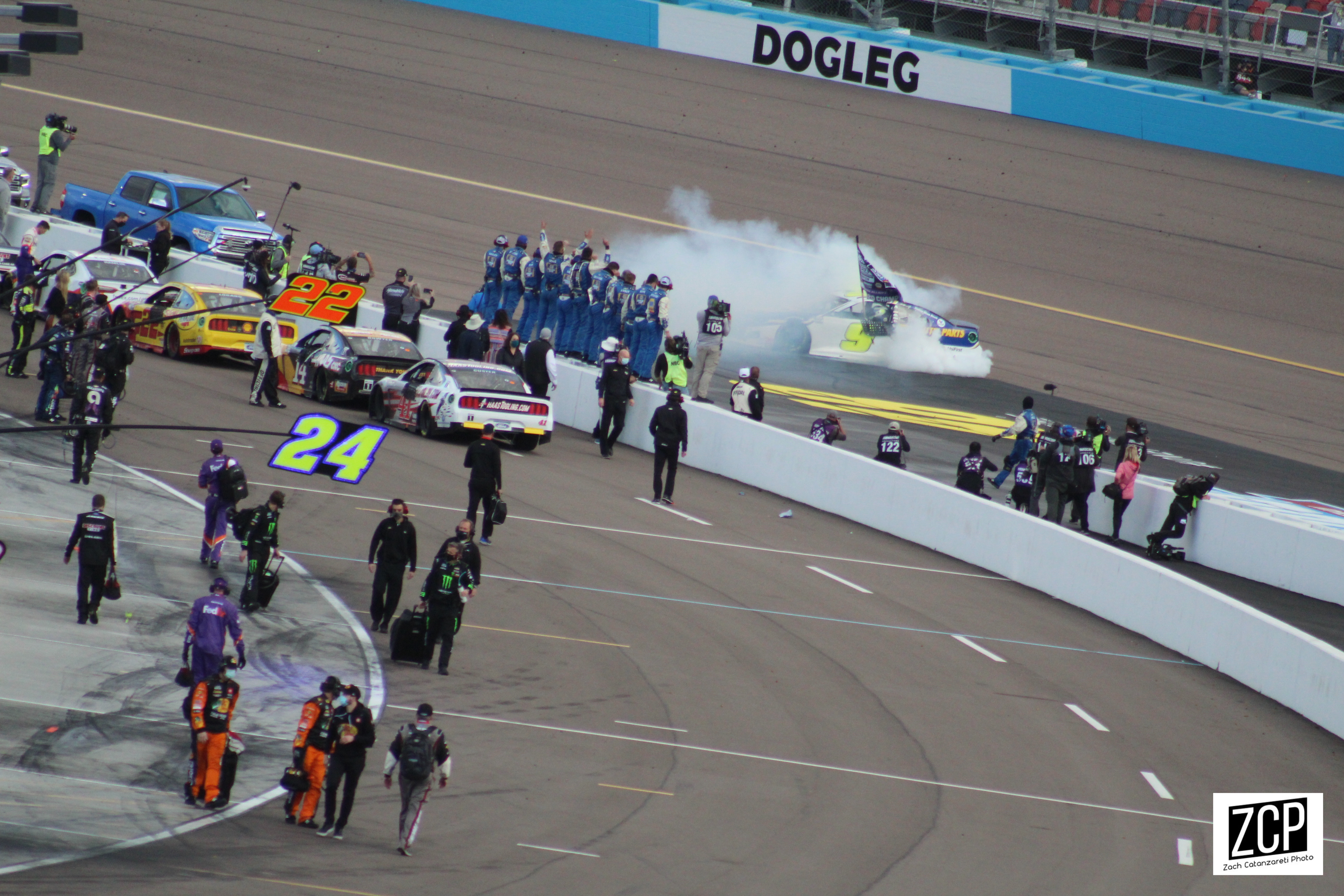
Chase Elliott (Phoenix, 2020)

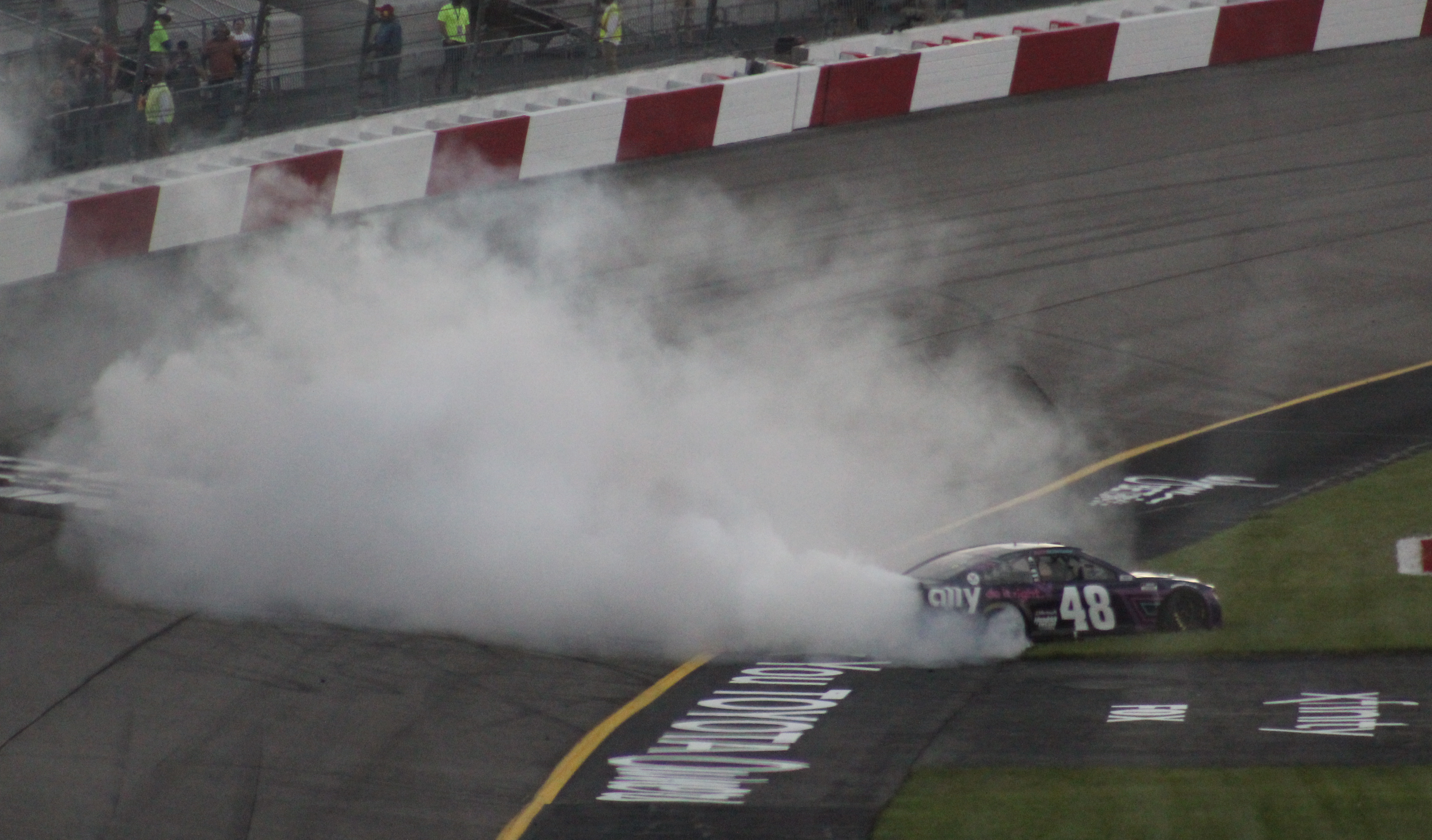
Alex Bowman (Richmond, 2021)

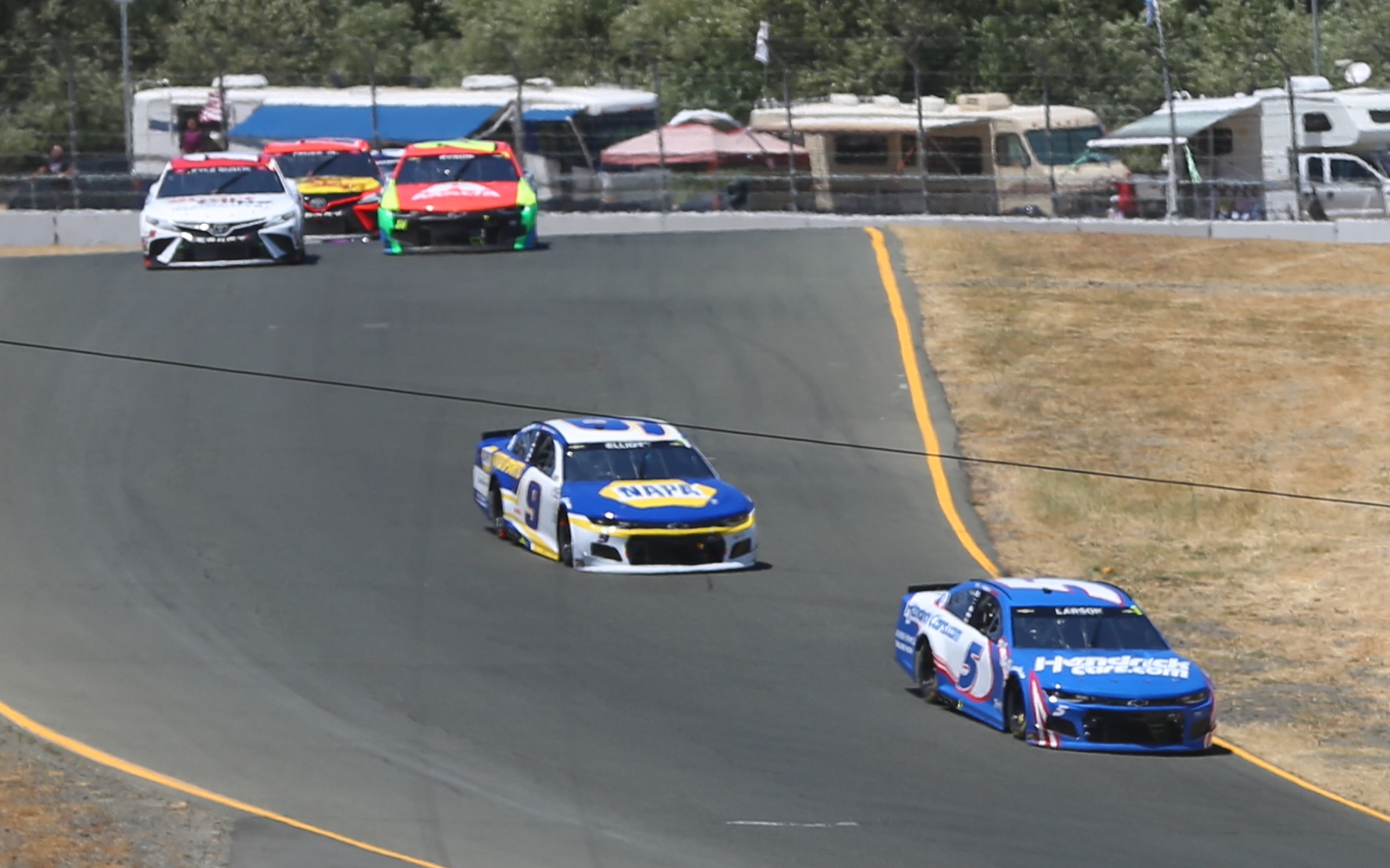
Kyle Larson (Sonoma, 2021)

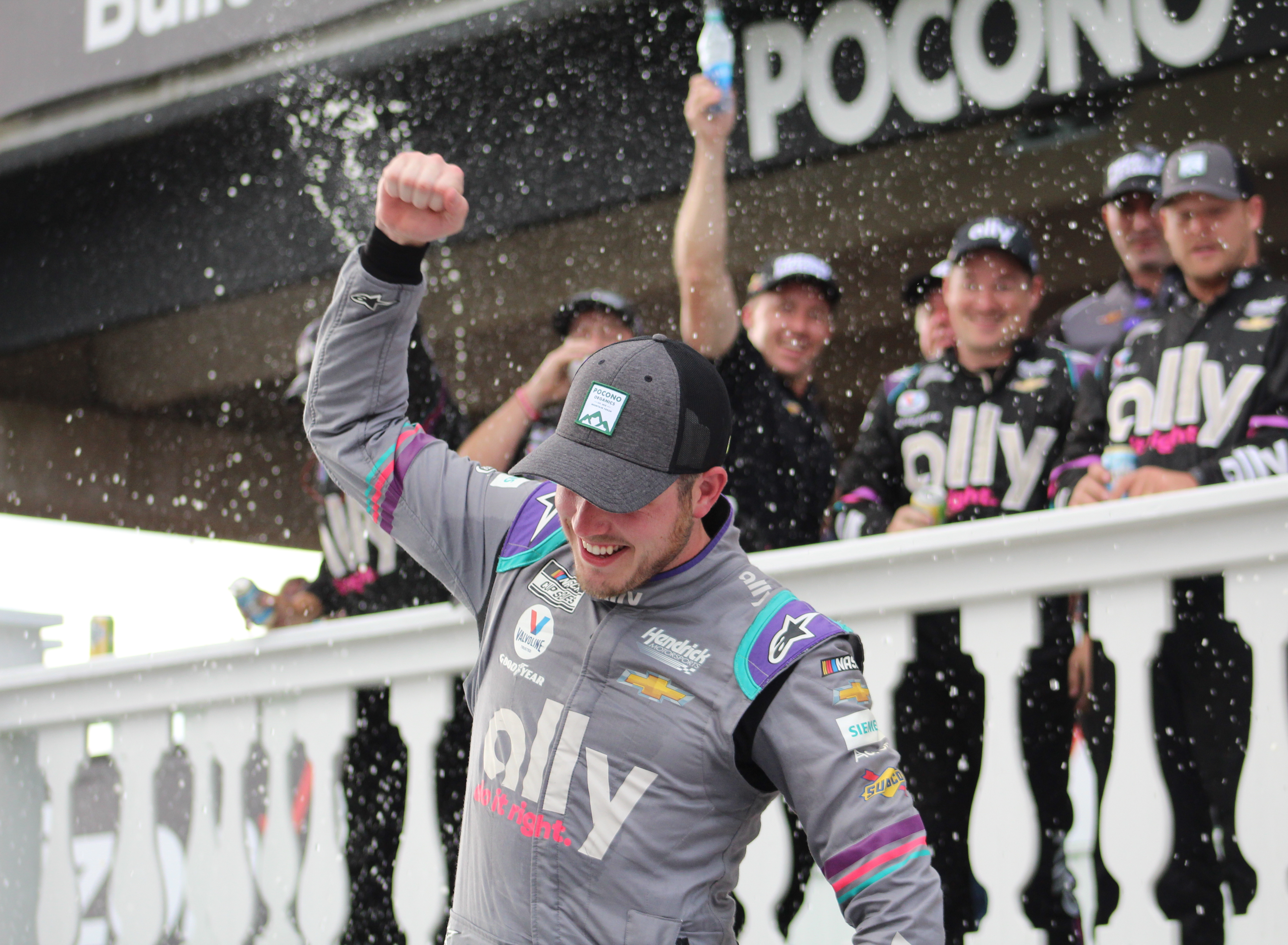
Alex Bowman (Pocono, 2021)

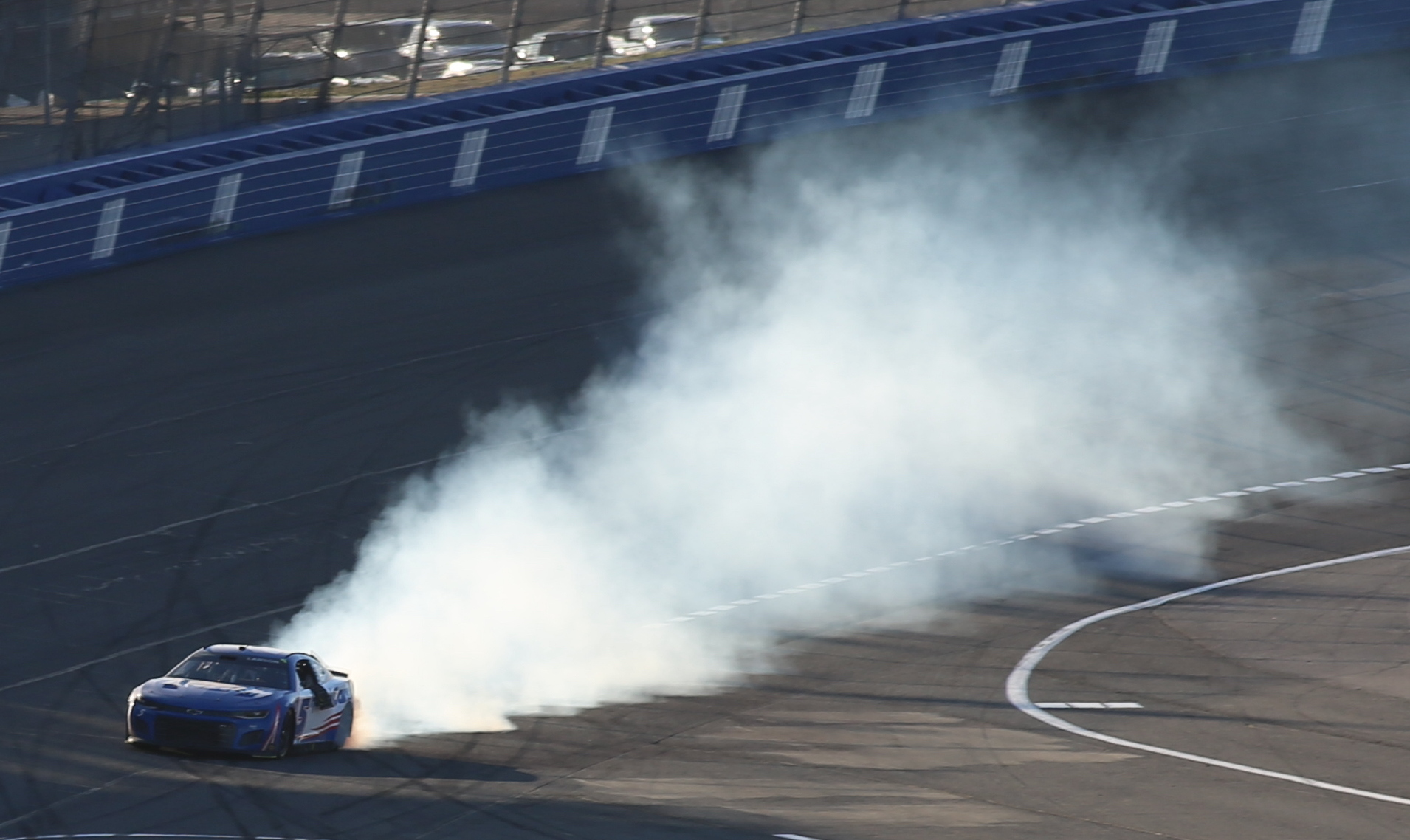
Kyle Larson (Fontana, 2022)

. – Hendrick won driver's championship

NASCAR Cup Series victories
No.	Date	Season	Car #	Driver	Race	Track
1	April 29, 1984	1984 (Note: The team was known as All Star Racing in 1984.)	5	Geoff Bodine	Sovran Bank 500	Martinsville Speedway
2	July 14, 1984	1984	5	Geoff Bodine	Pepsi 420	Nashville Fairgrounds Speedway
3	November 18, 1984	1984	5	Geoff Bodine	Winston Western 500	Riverside International Raceway
4	February 16, 1986	1986	5	Geoff Bodine	Daytona 500	Daytona International Speedway
5	May 18, 1986	1986	5	Geoff Bodine	Budweiser 500	Dover Downs International Speedway
6	June 8, 1986	1986	25	Tim Richmond	Miller High Life 500	Pocono International Raceway
7	July 4, 1986	1986	25	Tim Richmond	Firecracker 400	Daytona International Speedway
8	July 20, 1986	1986	25	Tim Richmond	Summer 500	Pocono International Raceway
9	August 10, 1986	1986	25	Tim Richmond	The Budweiser at the Glen	Watkins Glen International Raceway
10	August 31, 1986	1986	25	Tim Richmond	Southern 500	Darlington Raceway
11	September 7, 1986	1986	25	Tim Richmond	Wrangler Jeans Indigo 400	Richmond Fairgrounds Raceway
12	November 16, 1986	1986	25	Tim Richmond	Winston Western 500	Riverside International Raceway
13	June 14, 1987	1987	25	Tim Richmond	Miller High Life 500	Pocono International Raceway
14	June 21, 1987	1987	25	Tim Richmond	Budweiser 400	Riverside International Raceway
15	September 27, 1987	1987	17	Darrell Waltrip	Goody's 500	Martinsville Speedway
16	May 29, 1988	1988	17	Darrell Waltrip	Coca-Cola 600	Charlotte Motor Speedway
17	June 19, 1988	1988	5	Geoff Bodine	Miller High Life 500	Pocono International Raceway
18	July 31, 1988	1988	25	Ken Schrader	Talladega DieHard 500	Alabama International Motor Speedway
19	September 25, 1988	1988	17	Darrell Waltrip	Goody's 500	Martinsville Speedway
20	February 19, 1989	1989	17	Darrell Waltrip	Daytona 500	Daytona International Speedway
21	March 19, 1989	1989	17	Darrell Waltrip	Motorcraft Quality Parts 500	Atlanta International Raceway
22	April 23, 1989	1989	17	Darrell Waltrip	Pannill Sweatshirts 500	Martinsville Speedway
23	May 28, 1989	1989	17	Darrell Waltrip	Coca-Cola 600	Charlotte Motor Speedway
24	August 26, 1989	1989	17	Darrell Waltrip	Busch 500	Bristol International Raceway
25	September 24, 1989	1989	17	Darrell Waltrip	Goody's 500	Martinsville Speedway
26	October 8, 1989	1989	25	Ken Schrader	All Pro Auto Parts 500	Charlotte Motor Speedway
27	October 15, 1989	1989	5	Geoff Bodine	Holly Farms 400	North Wilkesboro Speedway
28	August 12, 1990	1990	5	Ricky Rudd	Budweiser at the Glen	Watkins Glen International Raceway
29	March 18, 1991	1991	25	Ken Schrader	Motorcraft Quality Parts 500	Atlanta Motor Speedway
30	April 7, 1991	1991	5	Ricky Rudd	TranSouth 500	Darlington Raceway
31	June 3, 1991	1991	25	Ken Schrader	Budweiser 500	Dover Downs International Speedway
32	September 20, 1992	1992	5	Ricky Rudd	Peak AntiFreeze 500	Dover Downs International Speedway
33	June 20, 1993	1993	5	Ricky Rudd	Miller Genuine Draft 400	Michigan International Speedway
34	April 17, 1994	1994	5	Terry Labonte	First Union 400	North Wilkesboro Speedway
35	May 29, 1994	1994	24	Jeff Gordon	Coca-Cola 600	Charlotte Motor Speedway
36	August 6, 1994	1994	24	Jeff Gordon	Brickyard 400	Indianapolis Motor Speedway
37	September 10, 1994	1994	5	Terry Labonte	Miller Genuine Draft 400	Richmond International Raceway
38	October 30, 1994	1994	5	Terry Labonte	Slick 50 500	Phoenix International Raceway
39	February 26, 1995	1995	24	Jeff Gordon	Goodwrench 500	North Carolina Motor Speedway
40	March 5, 1995	1995	5	Terry Labonte	Pontiac Excitement 400	Richmond International Raceway
41	March 12, 1995	1995	24	Jeff Gordon	Purolator 500	Atlanta Motor Speedway
42	April 2, 1995	1995	24	Jeff Gordon	Food City 500	Bristol International Raceway
43	June 11, 1995	1995	5	Terry Labonte	UAW-GM Teamwork 500	Pocono International Raceway
44	July 1, 1995	1995	24	Jeff Gordon	Pepsi 400	Daytona International Speedway
45	July 9, 1995	1995	24	Jeff Gordon	Slick 50 300	New Hampshire International Speedway
46	August 26, 1995	1995	5	Terry Labonte	Goody's 500	Bristol International Raceway
47	September 3, 1995	1995	24	Jeff Gordon	Mountain Dew Southern 500	Darlington Raceway
48	September 17, 1995	1995	24	Jeff Gordon	MBNA 500	Dover Downs International Speedway
49	March 3, 1996	1996	24	Jeff Gordon	Pontiac Excitement 400	Richmond International Raceway
50	March 24, 1996	1996	24	Jeff Gordon	TranSouth Financial 400	Darlington Raceway
51	March 31, 1996	1996	24	Jeff Gordon	Food City 500	Bristol Motor Speedway
52	April 14, 1996	1996	5	Terry Labonte	First Union 400	North Wilkesboro Speedway
53	June 2, 1996	1996	24	Jeff Gordon	Miller 500	Dover Downs International Speedway
54	June 16, 1996	1996	24	Jeff Gordon	UAW-GM Teamwork 500	Pocono Raceway
55	July 28, 1996	1996	24	Jeff Gordon	DieHard 500	Talladega Superspeedway
56	September 1, 1996	1996	24	Jeff Gordon	Mountain Dew Southern 500	Darlington Raceway
57	September 15, 1996	1996	24	Jeff Gordon	MBNA 500	Dover Downs International Speedway
58	September 22, 1996	1996	24	Jeff Gordon	Hanes 500	Martinsville Speedway
59	September 29, 1996	1996	24	Jeff Gordon	Tyson Holly Farms 400	North Wilkesboro Speedway
60	October 6, 1996	1996	5	Terry Labonte	UAW-GM Quality 500	Charlotte Motor Speedway
61	February 16, 1997	1997	24	Jeff Gordon	Daytona 500	Daytona International Speedway
62	February 23, 1997	1997	24	Jeff Gordon	Goodwrench Service 400	North Carolina Motor Speedway
63	April 13, 1997	1997	24	Jeff Gordon	Food City 500	Bristol Motor Speedway
64	April 20, 1997	1997	24	Jeff Gordon	Goody's Headache Powder 500	Martinsville Speedway
65	May 25, 1997	1997	24	Jeff Gordon	Coca-Cola 600	Charlotte Motor Speedway
66	June 8, 1997	1997	24	Jeff Gordon	Pocono 500	Pocono Raceway
67	June 22, 1997	1997	24	Jeff Gordon	California 500	California Speedway
68	August 10, 1997	1997	24	Jeff Gordon	The Bud at the Glen	Watkins Glen International Raceway
69	August 31, 1997	1997	24	Jeff Gordon	Mountain Dew Southern 500	Darlington Raceway
70	September 14, 1997	1997	24	Jeff Gordon	CMT 300	New Hampshire International Speedway
71	October 12, 1997	1997	5	Terry Labonte	DieHard 500	Talladega Superspeedway
72	February 22, 1998	1998	24	Jeff Gordon	GM Goodwrench Service Plus 400	North Carolina Speedway
73	March 29, 1998	1998	24	Jeff Gordon	Food City 500	Bristol Motor Speedway
74	May 24, 1998	1998	24	Jeff Gordon	Coca-Cola 600	Charlotte Motor Speedway
75	June 6, 1998	1998	5	Terry Labonte	Pontiac Excitement 400	Richmond International Raceway
76	June 28, 1998	1998	24	Jeff Gordon	Save Mart/Kragen 350	Sears Point Raceway
77	July 26, 1998	1998	24	Jeff Gordon	Pennsylvania 500	Pocono Raceway
78	August 1, 1998	1998	24	Jeff Gordon	Brickyard 400	Indianapolis Motor Speedway
79	August 9, 1998	1998	24	Jeff Gordon	The Bud at the Glen	Watkins Glen International Raceway
80	August 16, 1998	1998	24	Jeff Gordon	Pepsi 400	Michigan Speedway
81	August 30, 1998	1998	24	Jeff Gordon	Farm Aid on CMT 300	New Hampshire International Speedway
82	September 6, 1998	1998	24	Jeff Gordon	Pepsi Southern 500	Darlington Raceway
83	October 17, 1998	1998	24	Jeff Gordon	Pepsi 400	Daytona International Speedway
84	November 1, 1998	1998	24	Jeff Gordon	AC Delco 400	North Carolina Speedway
85	November 8, 1998	1998	24	Jeff Gordon	NAPA 500	Atlanta Motor Speedway
86	February 14, 1999	1999	24	Jeff Gordon	Daytona 500	Daytona International Speedway
87	March 14, 1999	1999	24	Jeff Gordon	Cracker Barrel 500	Atlanta Motor Speedway
88	March 28, 1999	1999	5	Terry Labonte	Primestar 500	Texas Motor Speedway
89	May 2, 1999	1999	24	Jeff Gordon	California 500	California Speedway
90	June 27, 1999	1999	24	Jeff Gordon	Save Mart/Kragen 350	Sears Point Raceway
91	August 15, 1999	1999	24	Jeff Gordon	Frontier at the Glen	Watkins Glen International Raceway
92	October 3, 1999	1999	24	Jeff Gordon	NAPA Autocare 500	Martinsville Speedway
93	October 11, 1999	1999	24	Jeff Gordon	UAW-GM Quality 500	Lowe's Motor Speedway
94	April 16, 2000	2000	24	Jeff Gordon	DieHard 500	Talladega Superspeedway
95	June 25, 2000	2000	24	Jeff Gordon	Save Mart/Kragen 350	Sears Point Raceway
96	September 9, 2000	2000	24	Jeff Gordon	Chevrolet Monte Carlo 400	Richmond International Raceway
97	November 20, 2000	2000	25	Jerry Nadeau	NAPA 500	Atlanta Motor Speedway
98	March 4, 2001	2001	24	Jeff Gordon	UAW-Daimler Chrysler 400	Las Vegas Motor Speedway
99	June 3, 2001	2001	24	Jeff Gordon	MBNA Platinum 400	Dover Downs International Speedway
100	June 10, 2001	2001	24	Jeff Gordon	Kmart 400	Michigan International Speedway
101	August 5, 2001	2001	24	Jeff Gordon	Brickyard 400	Indianapolis Motor Speedway
102	August 12, 2001	2001	24	Jeff Gordon	Global Crossing at the Glen	Watkins Glen International
103	September 30, 2001	2001	24	Jeff Gordon	Protection One 400	Kansas Speedway
104	April 28, 2002	2002	48	Jimmie Johnson	NAPA Auto Parts 500	California Speedway
105	June 2, 2002	2002	48	Jimmie Johnson	MBNA Platinum 400	Dover International Speedway
106	August 24, 2002	2002	24	Jeff Gordon	Sharpie 500	Bristol Motor Speedway
107	September 1, 2002	2002	24	Jeff Gordon	Mountain Dew Southern 500	Darlington Raceway
108	September 22, 2002	2002	48	Jimmie Johnson	MBNA All-American Heroes 400	Dover International Speedway
109	September 29, 2002	2002	24	Jeff Gordon	Protection One 400	Kansas Speedway
110	April 13, 2003	2003	24	Jeff Gordon	Virginia 500	Martinsville Speedway
111	May 3, 2003	2003	25	Joe Nemechek	Pontiac Excitement 400	Richmond International Raceway
112	May 25, 2003	2003	48	Jimmie Johnson	Coca-Cola 600	Lowe's Motor Speedway
113	July 20, 2003	2003	48	Jimmie Johnson	New England 300	New Hampshire International Speedway
114	August 31, 2003	2003	5	Terry Labonte	Mountain Dew Southern 500	Darlington Raceway
115	September 14, 2003	2003	48	Jimmie Johnson	Sylvania 300	New Hampshire International Speedway
116	October 19, 2003	2003	24	Jeff Gordon	Subway 500	Martinsville Speedway
117	October 26–27, 2003	2003	24	Jeff Gordon	Bass Pro Shops MBNA 500	Atlanta Motor Speedway
118	March 21, 2004	2004	48	Jimmie Johnson	Carolina Dodge Dealers 400	Darlington Raceway
119	April 25, 2004	2004	24	Jeff Gordon	Aaron's 499	Talladega Superspeedway
120	May 2, 2004	2004	24	Jeff Gordon	Auto Club 500	California Speedway
121	May 30, 2004	2004	48	Jimmie Johnson	Coca-Cola 600	Lowe's Motor Speedway
122	June 13, 2004	2004	48	Jimmie Johnson	Pocono 500	Pocono Raceway
123	June 27, 2004	2004	24	Jeff Gordon	Dodge/Save Mart 350	Infineon Raceway
124	July 3, 2004	2004	24	Jeff Gordon	Pepsi 400	Daytona International Speedway
125	August 1, 2004	2004	48	Jimmie Johnson	Pennsylvania 500	Pocono Raceway
126	August 8, 2004	2004	24	Jeff Gordon	Brickyard 400	Indianapolis Motor Speedway
127	October 16, 2004	2004	48	Jimmie Johnson	UAW-GM Quality 500	Lowe's Motor Speedway
128	October 24, 2004	2004	48	Jimmie Johnson	Subway 500	Martinsville Speedway
129	October 31, 2004	2004	48	Jimmie Johnson	Bass Pro Shops MBNA 500	Atlanta Motor Speedway
130	November 14, 2004	2004	48	Jimmie Johnson	Mountain Dew Southern 500	Darlington Raceway
131	February 20, 2005	2005	24	Jeff Gordon	Daytona 500	Daytona International Speedway
132	March 13, 2005	2005	48	Jimmie Johnson	UAW-DaimlerChrysler 400	Las Vegas Motor Speedway
133	April 10, 2005	2005	24	Jeff Gordon	Advance Auto Parts 500	Martinsville Speedway
134	May 1, 2005	2005	24	Jeff Gordon	Aaron's 499	Talladega Superspeedway
135	May 29, 2005	2005	48	Jimmie Johnson	Coca-Cola 600	Lowe's Motor Speedway
136	September 4, 2005	2005	5	Kyle Busch	Sony HD 500	California Speedway
137	September 25, 2005	2005	48	Jimmie Johnson	MBNA NASCAR RacePoints 400	Dover International Speedway
138	October 15, 2005	2005	48	Jimmie Johnson	UAW-GM Quality 500	Lowe's Motor Speedway
139	October 23, 2005	2005	24	Jeff Gordon	Subway 500	Martinsville Speedway
140	November 13, 2005	2005	5	Kyle Busch	Checker Auto Parts 500	Phoenix International Raceway
141	February 19, 2006	2006	48	Jimmie Johnson	Daytona 500	Daytona International Speedway
142	March 12, 2006	2006	48	Jimmie Johnson	UAW-DaimlerChrysler 400	Las Vegas Motor Speedway
143	May 1, 2006	2006	48	Jimmie Johnson	Aaron's 499	Talladega Superspeedway
144	June 25, 2006	2006	24	Jeff Gordon	Dodge/Save Mart 350	Infineon Raceway
145	July 9, 2006	2006	24	Jeff Gordon	USG Sheetrock 400	Chicagoland Speedway
146	July 16, 2006	2006	5	Kyle Busch	Lenox Industrial Tools 300	New Hampshire International Speedway
147	August 6, 2006	2006	48	Jimmie Johnson	Allstate 400 at the Brickyard	Indianapolis Motor Speedway
148	October 8, 2006	2006	25	Brian Vickers	UAW-Ford 500	Talladega Superspeedway
149	October 22, 2006	2006	48	Jimmie Johnson	Subway 500	Martinsville Speedway
150	March 11, 2007	2007	48	Jimmie Johnson	UAW-DaimlerChrysler 400	Las Vegas Motor Speedway
151	March 18, 2007	2007	48	Jimmie Johnson	Kobalt Tools 500	Atlanta Motor Speedway
152	March 25, 2007	2007	5	Kyle Busch	Food City 500	Bristol Motor Speedway
153	April 1, 2007	2007	48	Jimmie Johnson	Goody's Cool Orange 500	Martinsville Speedway
154	April 21, 2007	2007	24	Jeff Gordon	Subway Fresh Fit 500	Phoenix International Raceway
155	April 29, 2007	2007	24	Jeff Gordon	Aaron's 499	Talladega Superspeedway
156	May 6, 2007	2007	48	Jimmie Johnson	Crown Royal 400	Richmond International Raceway
157	May 13, 2007	2007	24	Jeff Gordon	Dodge Avenger 500	Darlington Raceway
158	May 27, 2007	2007	25	Casey Mears	Coca-Cola 600	Lowe's Motor Speedway
159	June 10, 2007	2007	24	Jeff Gordon	Pocono 500	Pocono Raceway
160	September 2, 2007	2007	48	Jimmie Johnson	Sharp AQUOS 500	California Speedway
161	September 8, 2007	2007	48	Jimmie Johnson	Chevy Rock & Roll 400	Richmond International Raceway
162	October 7, 2007	2007	24	Jeff Gordon	UAW-Ford 500	Talladega Superspeedway
163	October 13, 2007	2007	24	Jeff Gordon	Bank of America 500	Lowe's Motor Speedway
164	October 21, 2007	2007	48	Jimmie Johnson	Subway 500	Martinsville Speedway
165	October 28, 2007	2007	48	Jimmie Johnson	Pep Boys Auto 500	Atlanta Motor Speedway
166	November 4, 2007	2007	48	Jimmie Johnson	Dickies 500	Texas Motor Speedway
167	November 11, 2007	2007	48	Jimmie Johnson	Checker Auto Parts 500	Phoenix International Raceway
168	April 12, 2008	2008	48	Jimmie Johnson	Subway Fresh Fit 500	Phoenix International Raceway
169	June 15, 2008	2008	88	Dale Earnhardt Jr.	LifeLock 400	Michigan International Speedway
170	July 27, 2008	2008	48	Jimmie Johnson	Allstate 400 at the Brickyard	Indianapolis Motor Speedway
171	August 31, 2008	2008	48	Jimmie Johnson	Pepsi 500	Auto Club Speedway
172	September 7, 2008	2008	48	Jimmie Johnson	Chevy Rock & Roll 400	Richmond International Raceway
173	September 28, 2008	2008	48	Jimmie Johnson	Camping World RV 400	Kansas Speedway
174	October 19, 2008	2008	48	Jimmie Johnson	TUMS QuikPak 500	Martinsville Speedway
175	November 9, 2008	2008	48	Jimmie Johnson	Checker O'Reilly Auto Parts 500	Phoenix International Raceway
176	March 29, 2009	2009	48	Jimmie Johnson	Goody's Fast Pain Relief 500	Martinsville Speedway
177	April 5, 2009	2009	24	Jeff Gordon	Samsung 500	Texas Motor Speedway
178	April 18, 2009	2009	5	Mark Martin	Subway Fresh Fit 500	Phoenix International Raceway
179	May 9, 2009	2009	5	Mark Martin	Southern 500	Darlington Raceway
180	May 31, 2009	2009	48	Jimmie Johnson	Autism Speaks 400	Dover International Speedway
181	June 14, 2009	2009	5	Mark Martin	LifeLock 400	Michigan International Speedway
182	July 11, 2009	2009	5	Mark Martin	LifeLock.com 400	Chicagoland Speedway
183	July 26, 2009	2009	48	Jimmie Johnson	Allstate 400 at the Brickyard	Indianapolis Motor Speedway
184	September 20, 2009	2009	5	Mark Martin	Sylvania 300	New Hampshire Motor Speedway
185	September 27, 2009	2009	48	Jimmie Johnson	AAA 400	Dover International Speedway
186	October 11, 2009	2009	48	Jimmie Johnson	Pepsi 500	Auto Club Speedway
187	October 17, 2009	2009	48	Jimmie Johnson	NASCAR Banking 500	Lowe's Motor Speedway
188	November 15, 2009	2009	48	Jimmie Johnson	Checker O'Reilly Auto Parts 500	Phoenix International Raceway
189	February 21, 2010	2010	48	Jimmie Johnson	Auto Club 500	Auto Club Speedway
190	February 28, 2010	2010	48	Jimmie Johnson	Shelby American	Las Vegas Motor Speedway
191	March 21, 2010	2010	48	Jimmie Johnson	Food City 500	Bristol Motor Speedway
192	June 20, 2010	2010	48	Jimmie Johnson	Toyota/Save Mart 350	Infineon Raceway
193	June 27, 2010	2010	48	Jimmie Johnson	Lenox Industrial Tools 301	New Hampshire Motor Speedway
194	September 26, 2010	2010	48	Jimmie Johnson	AAA 400	Dover International Speedway
195	February 27, 2011	2011	24	Jeff Gordon	Subway Fresh Fit 500	Phoenix International Raceway
196	April 17, 2011	2011	48	Jimmie Johnson	Aaron's 499	Talladega Superspeedway
197	June 12, 2011	2011	24	Jeff Gordon	5-hour Energy 500	Pocono Raceway
198	September 6, 2011	2011	24	Jeff Gordon	AdvoCare 500	Atlanta Motor Speedway
199	October 9, 2011	2011	48	Jimmie Johnson	Hollywood Casino 400	Kansas Speedway
200	May 12, 2012	2012	48	Jimmie Johnson	Bojangles' Southern 500	Darlington Raceway
201	May 27, 2012	2012	5	Kasey Kahne	Coca-Cola 600	Charlotte Motor Speedway
202	June 3, 2012	2012	48	Jimmie Johnson	FedEx 400	Dover International Speedway
203	June 17, 2012	2012	88	Dale Earnhardt Jr.	Quicken Loans 400	Michigan International Speedway
204	July 15, 2012	2012	5	Kasey Kahne	Lenox Industrial Tools 301	New Hampshire Motor Speedway
205	July 29, 2012	2012	48	Jimmie Johnson	Brickyard 400	Indianapolis Motor Speedway
206	August 5, 2012	2012	24	Jeff Gordon	Pennsylvania 400	Pocono Raceway
207	October 28, 2012	2012	48	Jimmie Johnson	Tums Fast Relief 500	Martinsville Speedway
208	November 4, 2012	2012	48	Jimmie Johnson	AAA Texas 500	Texas Motor Speedway
209	November 18, 2012	2012	24	Jeff Gordon	Ford EcoBoost 400	Homestead-Miami Speedway
210	February 24, 2013	2013	48	Jimmie Johnson	Daytona 500	Daytona International Speedway
211	March 17, 2013	2013	5	Kasey Kahne	Food City 500	Bristol Motor Speedway
212	April 7, 2013	2013	48	Jimmie Johnson	STP Gas Booster 500	Martinsville Speedway
213	June 9, 2013	2013	48	Jimmie Johnson	Party in the Poconos 400	Pocono Raceway
214	July 6, 2013	2013	48	Jimmie Johnson	Coke Zero 400	Daytona International Speedway
215	August 4, 2013	2013	5	Kasey Kahne	Gobowling.com 400	Pocono Raceway
216	September 29, 2013	2013	48	Jimmie Johnson	AAA 400	Dover International Speedway
217	October 27, 2013	2013	24	Jeff Gordon	Goody's Headache Relief Shot 500	Martinsville Speedway
218	November 3, 2013	2013	48	Jimmie Johnson	AAA Texas 500	Texas Motor Speedway
219	February 23, 2014	2014	88	Dale Earnhardt Jr.	Daytona 500	Daytona International Speedway
220	May 10, 2014	2014	24	Jeff Gordon	5-hour Energy 400	Kansas Speedway
221	May 25, 2014	2014	48	Jimmie Johnson	Coca-Cola 600	Charlotte Motor Speedway
222	June 1, 2014	2014	48	Jimmie Johnson	FedEx 400	Dover International Speedway
223	June 8, 2014	2014	88	Dale Earnhardt Jr.	Pocono 400	Pocono Raceway
224	June 15, 2014	2014	48	Jimmie Johnson	Quicken Loans 400	Michigan International Speedway
225	July 27, 2014	2014	24	Jeff Gordon	Brickyard 400	Indianapolis Motor Speedway
226	August 3, 2014	2014	88	Dale Earnhardt Jr.	Gobowling.com 400	Pocono Raceway
227	August 17, 2014	2014	24	Jeff Gordon	Pure Michigan 400	Michigan International Speedway
228	August 31, 2014	2014	5	Kasey Kahne	Oral-B USA 500	Atlanta Motor Speedway
229	September 29, 2014	2014	24	Jeff Gordon	AAA 400	Dover International Speedway
230	October 26, 2014	2014	88	Dale Earnhardt Jr.	Goody's Headache Relief Shot 500	Martinsville Speedway
231	November 2, 2014	2014	48	Jimmie Johnson	AAA Texas 500	Texas Motor Speedway
232	March 1, 2015	2015	48	Jimmie Johnson	Folds of Honor QuikTrip 500	Atlanta Motor Speedway
233	April 11, 2015	2015	48	Jimmie Johnson	Duck Commander 500	Texas Motor Speedway
234	May 3, 2015	2015	88	Dale Earnhardt Jr.	GEICO 500	Talladega Superspeedway
235	May 9, 2015	2015	48	Jimmie Johnson	SpongeBob SquarePants 400	Kansas Speedway
236	May 31, 2015	2015	48	Jimmie Johnson	FedEx 400	Dover International Speedway
237	July 5, 2015	2015	88	Dale Earnhardt Jr.	Coke Zero 400	Daytona International Speedway
238	November 1, 2015	2015	24	Jeff Gordon	Goody's Headache Relief Shot 500	Martinsville Speedway
239	November 8, 2015	2015	48	Jimmie Johnson	AAA Texas 500	Texas Motor Speedway
240	November 15, 2015	2015	88	Dale Earnhardt Jr.	Quicken Loans Race for Heroes 500	Phoenix International Raceway
241	February 28, 2016	2016	48	Jimmie Johnson	Folds of Honor QuikTrip 500	Atlanta Motor Speedway
242	March 20, 2016	2016	48	Jimmie Johnson	Auto Club 400	Auto Club Speedway
243	October 9, 2016	2016	48	Jimmie Johnson	Bank of America 500	Charlotte Motor Speedway
244	October 30, 2016	2016	48	Jimmie Johnson	Goody's Fast Relief 500	Martinsville Speedway
245	November 20, 2016	2016	48	Jimmie Johnson	Ford EcoBoost 400	Homestead-Miami Speedway
246	April 9, 2017	2017	48	Jimmie Johnson	O'Reilly Auto Parts 500	Texas Motor Speedway
247	April 24, 2017	2017	48	Jimmie Johnson	Food City 500	Bristol Motor Speedway
248	June 4, 2017	2017	48	Jimmie Johnson	AAA 400 Drive for Autism	Dover International Speedway
249	July 23, 2017	2017	5	Kasey Kahne	Brickyard 400	Indianapolis Motor Speedway
250	August 5, 2018	2018	9	Chase Elliott	Go Bowling at The Glen	Watkins Glen International
251	October 7, 2018	2018	9	Chase Elliott	Gander Outdoors 400	Dover International Speedway
252	October 21, 2018	2018	9	Chase Elliott	Hollywood Casino 400	Kansas Speedway
253	April 28, 2019	2019	9	Chase Elliott	GEICO 500	Talladega Superspeedway
254	June 30, 2019	2019	88	Alex Bowman	Camping World 400	Chicagoland Speedway
255	August 4, 2019	2019	9	Chase Elliott	Go Bowling at The Glen	Watkins Glen International
256	September 29, 2019	2019	9	Chase Elliott	Bank of America Roval 400	Charlotte Roval
257	March 1, 2020	2020	88	Alex Bowman	Auto Club 400	Auto Club Speedway
258	May 28, 2020	2020	9	Chase Elliott	Alsco Uniforms 500	Charlotte Motor Speedway
259	August 16, 2020	2020	9	Chase Elliott	Go Bowling 235	Daytona Road Course
260	August 29, 2020	2020	24	William Byron	Coke Zero Sugar 400	Daytona International Speedway
261	October 11, 2020	2020	9	Chase Elliott	Bank of America Roval 400	Charlotte Roval
262	November 1, 2020	2020	9	Chase Elliott	Xfinity 500	Martinsville Speedway
263	November 8, 2020	2020	9	Chase Elliott	Season Finale 500	Phoenix Raceway
264	February 28, 2021	2021	24	William Byron	Dixie Vodka 400	Homestead-Miami Speedway
265	March 7, 2021	2021	5	Kyle Larson	Pennzoil 400	Las Vegas Motor Speedway
266	April 18, 2021	2021	48	Alex Bowman	Toyota Owners 400	Richmond Raceway
267	May 16, 2021	2021	48	Alex Bowman	Drydene 400 (Note: Bowman led a 1-2-3-4 finish for Hendrick, only the second time that has been accomplished in the modern era of NASCAR (1972-present).)	Dover International Speedway
268	May 23, 2021	2021	9	Chase Elliott	EchoPark Texas Grand Prix	Circuit of the Americas
269	May 30, 2021	2021	5	Kyle Larson	Coca-Cola 600	Charlotte Motor Speedway
270	June 6, 2021	2021	5	Kyle Larson	Toyota/Save Mart 350	Sonoma Raceway
271	June 20, 2021	2021	5	Kyle Larson	Ally 400	Nashville Superspeedway
272	June 26, 2021	2021	48	Alex Bowman	Pocono Organics CBD 325	Pocono Raceway
273	July 4, 2021	2021	9	Chase Elliott	Jockey Made in America 250	Road America
274	August 8, 2021	2021	5	Kyle Larson	Go Bowling at The Glen	Watkins Glen International
275	September 18, 2021	2021	5	Kyle Larson	Bass Pro Shops NRA Night Race	Bristol Motor Speedway
276	October 10, 2021	2021	5	Kyle Larson	Bank of America Roval 400	Charlotte Roval
277	October 17, 2021	2021	5	Kyle Larson	Autotrader EchoPark Automotive 500	Texas Motor Speedway
278	October 24, 2021	2021	5	Kyle Larson	Hollywood Casino 400	Kansas Speedway
279	October 31, 2021	2021	48	Alex Bowman	Xfinity 500	Martinsville Speedway
280	November 7, 2021	2021	5	Kyle Larson	Season Finale 500	Phoenix Raceway
281	February 27, 2022	2022	5	Kyle Larson	WISE Power 400	Auto Club Speedway
282	March 6, 2022	2022	48	Alex Bowman	Pennzoil 400	Las Vegas Motor Speedway
283	March 20, 2022	2022	24	William Byron	Folds of Honor QuikTrip 500	Atlanta Motor Speedway
284	April 9, 2022	2022	24	William Byron	Blue-Emu Maximum Pain Relief 400	Martinsville Speedway
285	May 1–2, 2022	2022	9	Chase Elliott	DuraMAX Drydene 400	Dover Motor Speedway
286	June 26, 2022	2022	9	Chase Elliott	Ally 400	Nashville Superspeedway
287	July 10, 2022	2022	9	Chase Elliott	Quaker State 400	Atlanta Motor Speedway
288 (Note: Denny Hamlin and second-place finisher Kyle Busch were disqualified after failing post-race inspection. Third-place finisher Elliott was awarded the win.)	July 24, 2022	2022	9	Chase Elliott	M&M's Fan Appreciation 400	Pocono Raceway
289	August 21, 2022	2022	5	Kyle Larson	Go Bowling at The Glen	Watkins Glen International
290	October 2, 2022	2022	9	Chase Elliott	YellaWood 500	Talladega Superspeedway
291	October 23, 2022	2022	5	Kyle Larson	Dixie Vodka 400	Homestead-Miami Speedway
292	March 5, 2023	2023	24	William Byron	Pennzoil 400	Las Vegas Motor Speedway
293	March 12, 2023	2023	24	William Byron	United Rentals Work United 500	Phoenix Raceway
294	April 2, 2023	2023	5	Kyle Larson	Toyota Owners 400	Richmond Raceway
295	April 16, 2023	2023	5	Kyle Larson	NOCO 400	Martinsville Speedway
296	May 14, 2023	2023	24	William Byron	Goodyear 400	Darlington Raceway
297	July 9, 2023	2023	24	William Byron	Quaker State 400	Atlanta Motor Speedway
298	August 20, 2023	2023	24	William Byron	Go Bowling at The Glen	Watkins Glen International
299	September 3, 2023	2023	5	Kyle Larson	Cook Out Southern 500	Darlington Raceway
300	September 24, 2023	2023	24	William Byron	AutoTrader EchoPark Automotive 400	Texas Motor Speedway
301	October 15, 2023	2023	5	Kyle Larson	South Point 400	Las Vegas Motor Speedway
302	February 19, 2024	2024	24	William Byron	Daytona 500	Daytona International Speedway
303	March 3, 2024	2024	5	Kyle Larson	Penzoil 400	Las Vegas Motor Speedway
304	March 24, 2024	2024	24	William Byron	EchoPark Automotive Grand Prix	Circuit of the Americas
305	April 7, 2024	2024	24	William Byron	Cook Out 400	Martinsville Speedway
306	April 14, 2024	2024	9	Chase Elliott	Autotrader EchoPark Automotive 400	Texas Motor Speedway
307	May 5, 2024	2024	5	Kyle Larson	AdventHealth 400	Kansas Speedway
308	June 9, 2024	2024	5	Kyle Larson	Toyota/Save Mart 350	Sonoma Raceway
309	July 7, 2024	2024	48	Alex Bowman	Grant Park 165	Chicago Street Course
310	July 21, 2024	2024	5	Kyle Larson	Brickyard 400	Indianapolis Motor Speedway
311	September 21, 2024	2024	5	Kyle Larson	Bass Pro Shops Night Race	Bristol Motor Speedway
312	October 13, 2024	2024	5	Kyle Larson	Bank of America Roval 400	Charlotte Roval
313	February 16, 2025	2025	24	William Byron	Daytona 500	Daytona International Speedway
314	March 23, 2025	2025	5	Kyle Larson	Straight Talk Wireless 400	Homestead–Miami Speedway
315	April 13, 2025	2025	5	Kyle Larson	Food City 500	Bristol Motor Speedway
316	May 11, 2025	2025	5	Kyle Larson	AdventHealth 400	Kansas Speedway
317	June 28, 2025	2025	9	Chase Elliott	Quaker State 400	Atlanta Motor Speedway
318	August 3, 2025	2025	24	William Byron	Iowa Corn 350	Iowa Speedway
319	September 28, 2025	2025	9	Chase Elliott	Hollywood Casino 400	Kansas Speedway
320	October 26, 2025	2025	24	William Byron	Xfinity 500	Martinsville Speedway
321	March 29, 2026	2026	9	Chase Elliott	Cook Out 400	Martinsville Speedway
322	May 3, 2026	2026	9	Chase Elliott	Würth 400	Texas Motor Speedway
323	September 13, 2026	2026	5	Kyle Larson	Enjoy Illinois 300	World Wide Technology Raceway
324	September 27, 2026	2026	5	Kyle Larson	Hollywood Casino 400	Kansas Speedway
325	October 25, 2026	2026	5	Kyle Larson	YellaWood 500	Talladega Superspeedway
326	November 1, 2026	2026	24	William Byron	Xfinity 500	Martinsville Speedway

=== Non-points exhibition race wins ===
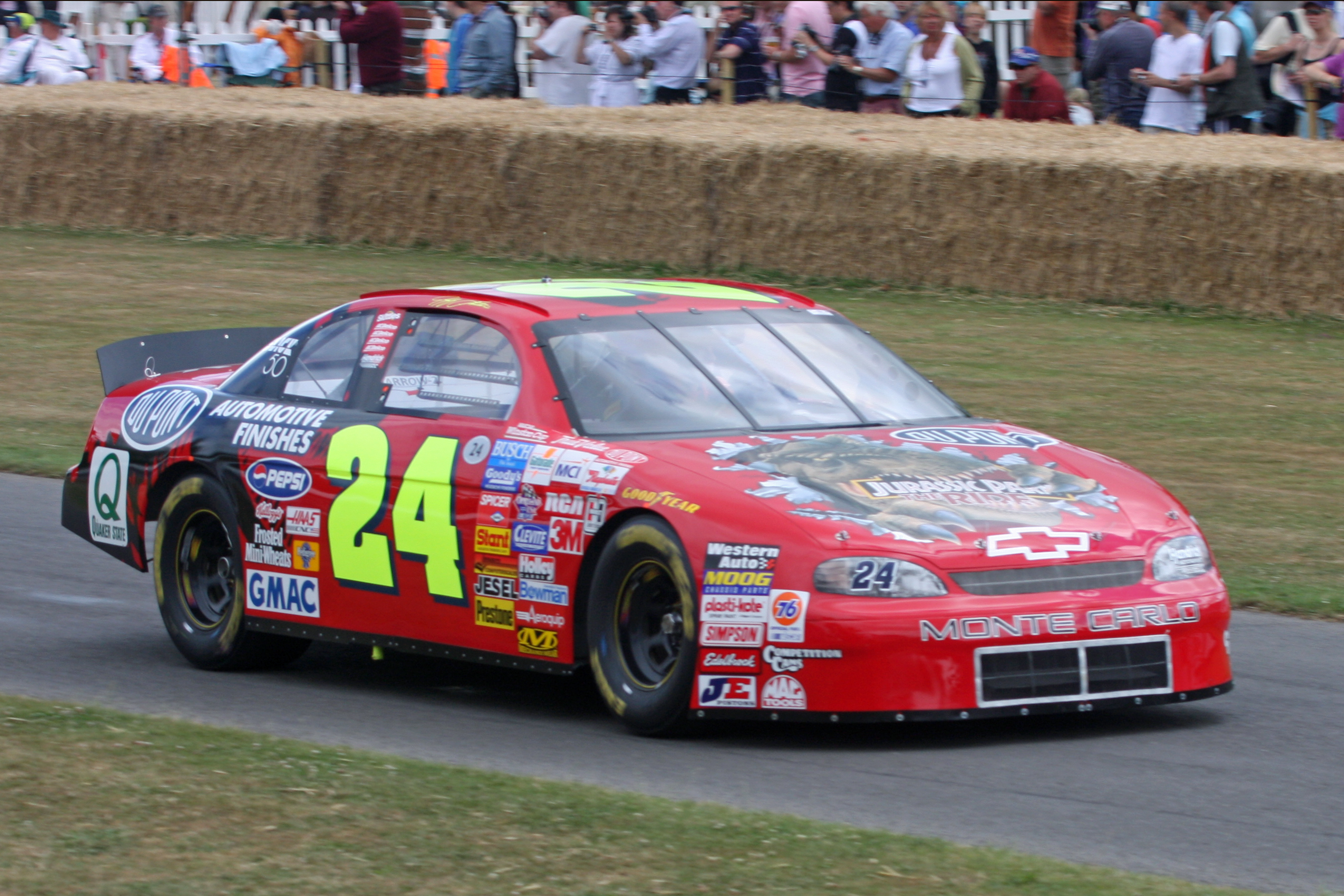
Jeff Gordon (Charlotte, 1997)

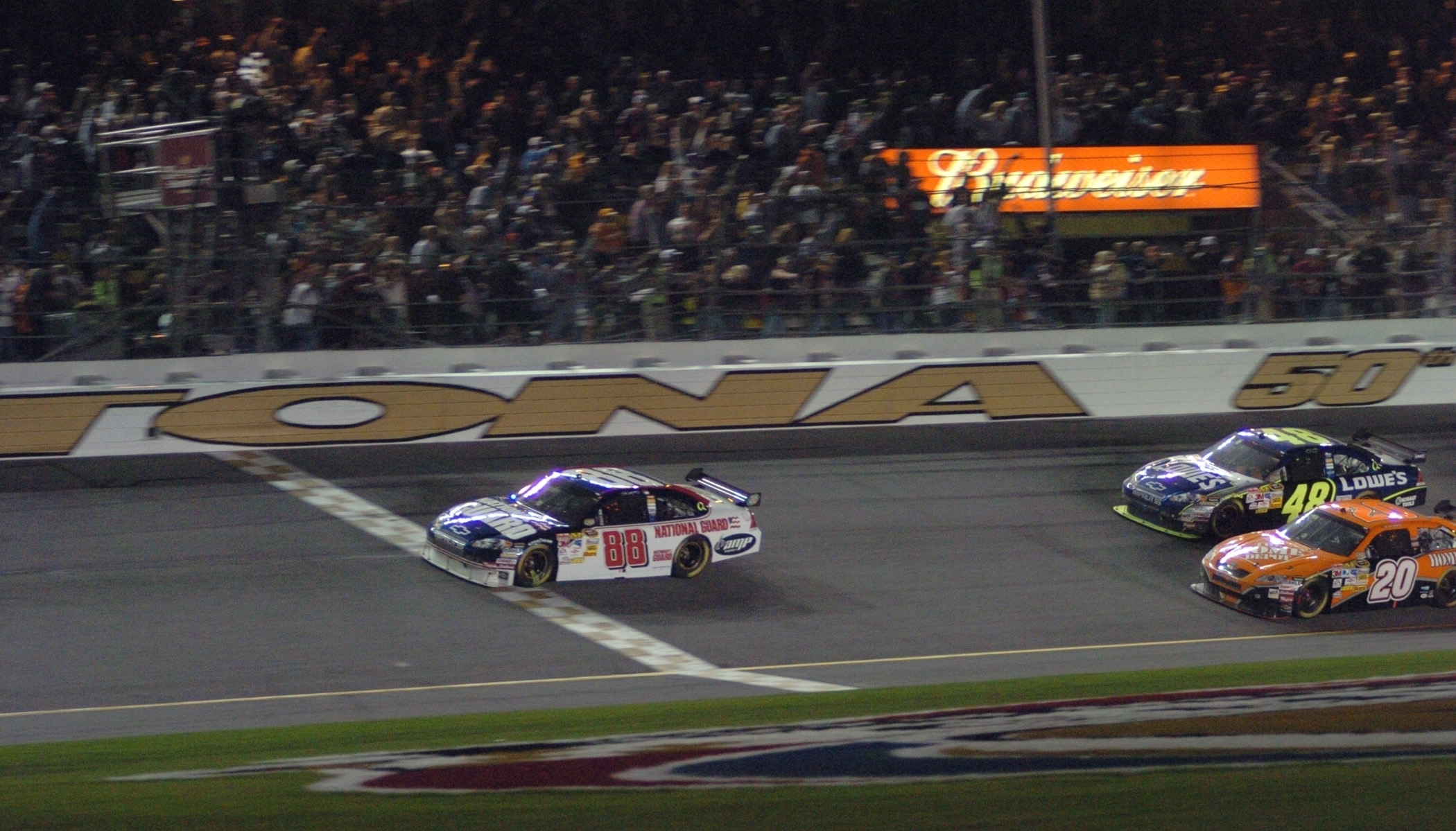
Dale Earnhardt Jr. (Daytona, 2008)

NASCAR exhibition race victories
No.	Date	Season	Car #	Driver	Race	Track
1	February 12, 1987	1987	35	Benny Parsons	Second 7-Eleven Twin 125	Daytona International Speedway
2	February 11, 1988	1988	17	Darrell Waltrip	Second Twin 125 Qualifier	Daytona International Speedway
3	February 12, 1989	1989	25	Ken Schrader	Busch Clash	Daytona International Speedway
4	February 16, 1989	1989	25	Ken Schrader	First Twin 125 Qualifier	Daytona International Speedway
5	February 11, 1990	1990	25	Ken Schrader	Busch Clash	Daytona International Speedway
6	February 11, 1993	1993	24	Jeff Gordon	Gatorade Twin 125 Qualifier #1	Daytona International Speedway
7	February 13, 1994	1994	24	Jeff Gordon	Busch Clash	Daytona International Speedway
8	May 21, 1994	1994	24	Jeff Gordon	Winston Select Open	Charlotte Motor Speedway
9	May 22, 1995	1995	24	Jeff Gordon	The Winston Select	Charlotte Motor Speedway
10	February 9, 1997	1997	24	Jeff Gordon	Busch Clash	Daytona International Speedway
11	May 17, 1997	1997	25	Ricky Craven	Winston Open	Charlotte Motor Speedway
12	May 17, 1997	1997	24	Jeff Gordon	The Winston	Charlotte Motor Speedway
13	May 22, 1999	1999	5	Terry Labonte	The Winston	Lowe's Motor Speedway
14	May 20, 2000	2000	25	Jerry Nadeau	No Bull 25 Shootout Race #1	Lowe's Motor Speedway
15	May 20, 2000	2000	25	Jerry Nadeau	No Bull Sprint	Lowe's Motor Speedway
16	May 19, 2001	2001	24	Jeff Gordon	The Winston	Lowe's Motor Speedway
17	February 14, 2002	2002	24	Jeff Gordon	Gatorade 125 #1	Daytona International Speedway
18	May 17, 2003	2003	48	Jimmie Johnson	The Winston	Lowe's Motor Speedway
19	February 12, 2005	2005	48	Jimmie Johnson	Budweiser Shootout	Daytona International Speedway
20	May 21, 2005	2005	25	Brian Vickers	Nextel Open	Lowe's Motor Speedway
21	February 16, 2006	2006	24	Jeff Gordon	Gatorade Duel 150 #2	Daytona International Speedway
22	May 20, 2006	2006	48	Jimmie Johnson	Nextel All-Star Challenge	Lowe's Motor Speedway
23	February 15, 2007	2007	24	Jeff Gordon	Gatorade Duel 150 #2	Daytona International Speedway
24	February 9, 2008	2008	88	Dale Earnhardt Jr.	Budweiser Shootout	Daytona International Speedway
25	February 14, 2008	2008	88	Dale Earnhardt Jr.	Gatorade Duel 150 #1	Daytona International Speedway
26	February 12, 2009	2009	24	Jeff Gordon	Gatorade Duel 150 #1	Daytona International Speedway
27	February 11, 2010	2010	48	Jimmie Johnson	Gatorade Duel 150 #1	Daytona International Speedway
28	May 19, 2012	2012	88	Dale Earnhardt Jr.	Sprint Showdown	Charlotte Motor Speedway
29	May 19, 2012	2012	48	Jimmie Johnson	Sprint All-Star Race	Charlotte Motor Speedway
30	May 18, 2013	2013	48	Jimmie Johnson	Sprint All-Star Race	Charlotte Motor Speedway
31	February 19, 2015	2015	88	Dale Earnhardt Jr.	Budweiser Duel #1	Daytona International Speedway
32	February 19, 2015	2015	48	Jimmie Johnson	Budweiser Duel #2	Daytona International Speedway
33	February 18, 2016	2016	88	Dale Earnhardt Jr.	Can-Am Duel 150 #1	Daytona International Speedway
34	February 23, 2017	2017	24	Chase Elliott	Can-Am Duel 150 #1	Daytona International Speedway
35	February 15, 2018	2018	9	Chase Elliott	Can-Am Duel 150 #2	Daytona International Speedway
36	February 10, 2019	2019	48	Jimmie Johnson	Advance Auto Parts Clash	Daytona International Speedway
37	February 13, 2020	2020	24	William Byron	Bluegreen Vacations Duel 150 #2	Daytona International Speedway
38	July 15, 2020	2020	9	Chase Elliott	NASCAR All-Star Race	Bristol Motor Speedway
39	June 13, 2021	2021	5	Kyle Larson	NASCAR All-Star Race	Texas Motor Speedway
40	May 21, 2023	2023	48	Josh Berry	NASCAR All-Star Open	North Wilkesboro Speedway
41	May 21, 2023	2023	5	Kyle Larson	NASCAR All-Star Race	North Wilkesboro Speedway
42	February 2, 2025	2025	9	Chase Elliott	Clash at Bowman Gray Stadium	Bowman Gray Stadium
43	February 12, 2026	2026	9	Chase Elliott	Duel #2	Daytona International Speedway

=== Wins by driver ===
Twenty drivers have won at least one points race for Hendrick Motorsports in the Cup Series. At the time of Jimmie Johnson's final points win in 2017, Jeff Gordon and Johnson had combined to win 176 of the 248 races for the organization, accounting for 71% of the victories. Since Hendrick now has 326 wins, that total is now 54%. Benny Parsons, Ricky Craven, and Josh Berry all won an exhibition race while driving for Hendrick but not a points race.

NASCAR Cup Series victories by driver
Driver	Wins (Points)	Wins (Exhibition)	Championships	First Win (Points)	Last Win (Points)
Jeff Gordon	93	11	4	1994	2015
Jimmie Johnson	83	8	7	2002	2017
Kyle Larson	29	2	3	2021	2026
Chase Elliott	23	5	1	2018	2026
William Byron	17	1	–	2020	2026
Terry Labonte	12	1	1	1994	2003
Dale Earnhardt Jr.	9	5	–	2008	2015
Darrell Waltrip	9	1	–	1987	1989
Tim Richmond	9	0	–	1986	1987
Alex Bowman	8	0	–	2019	2024
Geoff Bodine	7	0	–	1984	1989
Kasey Kahne	6	0	–	2012	2017
Mark Martin	5	0	–	2009	2009
Ken Schrader	4	3	–	1988	1991
Kyle Busch	4	0	–	2005	2007
Ricky Rudd	4	0	–	1990	1993
Jerry Nadeau	1	2	–	2000	2000
Brian Vickers	1	1	–	2006	2006
Casey Mears	1	0	–	2007	2007
Joe Nemechek	1	0	–	2003	2003
Benny Parsons	0	1	–	N/A	N/A
Ricky Craven	0	1	–	N/A	N/A
Josh Berry	0	1	–	N/A	N/A

=== Wins by track ===
Hendrick has won on 34 of the 39 tracks on which it has competed in the Cup Series, the exceptions being Kentucky Speedway, Indianapolis Road Course, Coronado Street Course, the Bristol dirt configuration, and the Autódromo Hermanos Rodríguez. This includes the final race at Nashville Fairgrounds Speedway in 1984, the inaugural Brickyard 400 at Indianapolis Motor Speedway in 1994, the final race at North Wilkesboro Speedway in 1996, the first race at California Speedway (now Auto Club Speedway) in 1997, and the first race at Kansas Speedway in 2001. Hendrick also won the inaugural race held on the Daytona Road Course in 2020, the first race at Circuit of the Americas in 2021, the first race at Nashville Superspeedway in 2021, and the return to Road America in 2021.

NASCAR Cup Series victories by racetrack
Order	Track	Wins	First Win	Last Win
1	Martinsville Speedway	32	1984	2026
2	Dover International Speedway	22	1986	2022
3	Charlotte Motor Speedway	21	1988	2021
4	Pocono Raceway	19	1986	2022
5	Atlanta Motor Speedway	18	1989	2025
6	Daytona International Speedway	17	1986	2025
7	Darlington Raceway	16	1986	2023
8	Talladega Superspeedway	15	1988	2026
9	Bristol Motor Speedway	14	1989	2025
10	Phoenix Raceway	13	1994	2023
10	Texas Motor Speedway	13	1999	2026
12	Richmond Raceway	12	1986	2023
12	Auto Club Speedway	12	1997	2022
12	Kansas Speedway	12	2001	2026
15	Watkins Glen International	11	1986	2023
15	Indianapolis Motor Speedway	11	1994	2024
17	Las Vegas Motor Speedway	10	2001	2024
18	New Hampshire Motor Speedway	9	1995	2012
19	Michigan International Speedway	8	1993	2014
19	Sonoma Raceway	8	1998	2024
21	Homestead–Miami Speedway	5	2012	2025
22	North Wilkesboro Speedway	4	1989	1996
22	North Carolina Motor Speedway	4	1995	1998
22	Charlotte Roval	4	2019	2024
25	Riverside International Raceway	3	1984	1987
25	Chicagoland Speedway	3	2006	2019
27	Nashville Superspeedway	2	2021	2022
27	Circuit of the Americas	2	2021	2024
29	Nashville Fairgrounds Speedway	1	1984	1984
29	Daytona Road Course	1	2020	2020
29	Road America	1	2021	2021
29	Chicago Street Course	1	2024	2024
29	Iowa Speedway	1	2025	2025
29	World Wide Technology Raceway	1	2026	2026

=== Wins by season ===
Since its inception in 1984, Hendrick Motorsports has won at least one race every season except 1985. In 2007, Hendrick accounted for 18 wins, which was half of the total number of points races (36). In 2021, Hendrick won 17 points races, as well as the All-Star Race.

. – Hendrick won driver's championship

Wins by Season
Year	Wins	Drivers	Tracks
1984	3	Geoff Bodine (3)	Martinsville Speedway, Nashville Fairgrounds Speedway, Riverside International Raceway
1985	0	None	None
1986	9	Tim Richmond (7), Geoff Bodine (2)	Daytona International Speedway (1 & 2), Dover Downs International Speedway, Pocono International Raceway (1 & 2), Watkins Glen International Raceway, Darlington Raceway, Richmond Fairgrounds Raceway, Riverside International Raceway
1987	3	Tim Richmond (2), Darrell Waltrip (1)	Pocono International Raceway, Riverside International Raceway, Martinsville Speedway
1988	4	Darrell Waltrip (2), Geoff Bodine (1), Ken Schrader (1)	Charlotte Motor Speedway, Pocono International Raceway, Alabama International Motor Speedway, Martinsville Speedway
1989	8	Darrell Waltrip (6), Geoff Bodine (1), Ken Schrader (1)	Daytona International Speedway, Atlanta International Raceway, Martinsville Speedway (1 & 2), Charlotte Motor Speedway (1 & 2), Bristol International Raceway, North Wilkesboro Speedway
1990	1	Ricky Rudd (1)	Watkins Glen International Raceway
1991	3	Ken Schrader (2), Ricky Rudd (1)	Atlanta Motor Speedway, Darlington Raceway, Dover Downs International Speedway
1992	1	Ricky Rudd (1)	Dover Downs International Speedway
1993	1	Ricky Rudd (1)	Michigan International Speedway
1994	5	Terry Labonte (3), Jeff Gordon (2)	North Wilkesboro Speedway, Charlotte Motor Speedway, Indianapolis Motor Speedway, Richmond International Raceway, Phoenix International Raceway
1995	10	Jeff Gordon (7), Terry Labonte (3)	North Carolina Motor Speedway, Richmond International Raceway, Atlanta Motor Speedway, Bristol International Raceway (1 & 2), Pocono International Raceway, Daytona International Speedway, New Hampshire International Speedway, Darlington Raceway, Dover Downs International Speedway
1996	12	Jeff Gordon (10), Terry Labonte (2)	Richmond International Raceway, Darlington Raceway (1 & 2), Bristol International Raceway, North Wilkesboro Speedway (1 & 2), Dover Downs International Speedway (1 & 2), Pocono Raceway, Talladega Superspeedway, Martinsville Speedway, Charlotte Motor Speedway
1997	11	Jeff Gordon (10), Terry Labonte (1)	Daytona International Speedway, North Carolina Motor Speedway, Bristol Motor Speedway, Martinsville Speedway, Charlotte Motor Speedway, Pocono Raceway, California Speedway, Watkins Glen International Raceway, Darlington Raceway, New Hampshire International Speedway, Talladega Superspeedway
1998	14	Jeff Gordon (13), Terry Labonte (1)	North Carolina Speedway (1 & 2), Bristol Motor Speedway, Charlotte Motor Speedway, Richmond International Raceway, Sears Point Raceway, Pocono Raceway, Indianapolis Motor Speedway, Watkins Glen International Raceway, Michigan Speedway, New Hampshire International Speedway, Darlington Raceway, Daytona International Speedway, Atlanta Motor Speedway
1999	8	Jeff Gordon (7), Terry Labonte (1)	Daytona International Speedway, Atlanta Motor Speedway, Texas Motor Speedway, California Speedway, Sears Point Raceway, Watkins Glen International Raceway, Martinsville Speedway, Lowe's Motor Speedway
2000	4	Jeff Gordon (3), Jerry Nadeau (1)	Talladega Superspeedway, Sears Point Raceway, Richmond International Raceway, Atlanta Motor Speedway
2001	6	Jeff Gordon (6)	Las Vegas Motor Speedway, Dover Downs International Speedway, Michigan International Speedway, Indianapolis Motor Speedway, Watkins Glen International, Kansas Speedway
2002	6	Jeff Gordon (3), Jimmie Johnson (3)	California Speedway, Dover International Speedway (1 & 2), Bristol Motor Speedway, Darlington Raceway, Kansas Speedway
2003	8	Jeff Gordon (3), Jimmie Johnson (3), Terry Labonte (1), Joe Nemechek (1)	Martinsville Speedway (1 & 2), Richmond International Raceway, Lowe's Motor Speedway, New Hampshire International Speedway (1 & 2), Darlington Raceway, Atlanta Motor Speedway
2004	13	Jimmie Johnson (8), Jeff Gordon (5)	Darlington Raceway (1 & 2), Talladega Superspeedway, California Speedway, Lowe's Motor Speedway (1 & 2), Pocono Raceway (1 & 2), Infineon Raceway, Daytona International Speedway, Indianapolis Motor Speedway, Martinsville Speedway, Atlanta Motor Speedway
2005	10	Jeff Gordon (4), Jimmie Johnson (4), Kyle Busch (2)	Daytona International Speedway, Las Vegas Motor Speedway, Martinsville Speedway (1 & 2), Talladega Superspeedway, Lowe's Motor Speedway (1 & 2), California Speedway, Dover International Speedway, Phoenix International Raceway
2006	9	Jimmie Johnson (5), Jeff Gordon (2), Kyle Busch (1), Brian Vickers (1)	Daytona International Speedway, Las Vegas Motor Speedway, Talladega Superspeedway (1 & 2), Infineon Raceway, Chicagoland Speedway, New Hampshire International Speedway, Indianapolis Motor Speedway, Martinsville Speedway
2007	18	Jimmie Johnson (10), Jeff Gordon (6), Kyle Busch (1), Casey Mears (1)	Las Vegas Motor Speedway, Atlanta Motor Speedway (1 & 2), Bristol Motor Speedway, Martinsville Speedway (1 & 2), Phoenix International Raceway (1 & 2), Talladega Superspeedway (1 & 2), Richmond International Raceway (1 & 2), Darlington Raceway, Lowe's Motor Speedway (1 & 2), Pocono Raceway, California Speedway, Texas Motor Speedway
2008	8	Jimmie Johnson (7), Dale Earnhardt Jr. (1)	Phoenix International Raceway (1 & 2), Michigan International Speedway, Indianapolis Motor Speedway, Auto Club Speedway, Richmond International Raceway, Kansas Speedway, Martinsville Speedway
2009	13	Jimmie Johnson (7), Mark Martin (5), Jeff Gordon (1)	Martinsville Speedway, Texas Motor Speedway, Phoenix International Raceway (1 & 2), Darlington Raceway, Dover International Speedway (1 & 2), Michigan International Speedway, Chicagoland Speedway, Indianapolis Motor Speedway, New Hampshire Motor Speedway, Auto Club Speedway, Lowe's Motor Speedway
2010	6	Jimmie Johnson (6)	Auto Club Speedway, Las Vegas Motor Speedway, Bristol Motor Speedway, Infineon Raceway, New Hampshire Motor Speedway, Dover International Speedway
2011	5	Jeff Gordon (3), Jimmie Johnson (2)	Phoenix International Raceway, Talladega Superspeedway, Pocono Raceway, Atlanta Motor Speedway, Kansas Speedway
2012	10	Jimmie Johnson (5), Jeff Gordon (2), Kasey Kahne (2), Dale Earnhardt Jr. (1)	Darlington Raceway, Charlotte Motor Speedway, Dover International Speedway, Michigan International Speedway, New Hampshire Motor Speedway, Indianapolis Motor Speedway, Pocono Raceway, Martinsville Speedway, Texas Motor Speedway, Homestead-Miami Speedway
2013	9	Jimmie Johnson (6), Kasey Kahne (2), Jeff Gordon (1)	Daytona International Speedway (1 & 2), Bristol Motor Speedway, Martinsville Speedway (1 & 2), Pocono Raceway (1 & 2), Dover International Speedway, Texas Motor Speedway
2014	13	Dale Earnhardt Jr. (4), Jeff Gordon (4), Jimmie Johnson (4), Kasey Kahne (1)	Daytona International Speedway, Kansas Speedway, Charlotte Motor Speedway, Dover International Speedway (1 & 2), Pocono Raceway (1 & 2), Michigan International Speedway (1 & 2), Indianapolis Motor Speedway, Atlanta Motor Speedway, Martinsville Speedway, Texas Motor Speedway
2015	9	Jimmie Johnson (5), Dale Earnhardt Jr. (3), Jeff Gordon (1)	Atlanta Motor Speedway, Texas Motor Speedway (1 & 2), Talladega Superspeedway, Kansas Speedway, Dover International Speedway, Daytona International Speedway, Martinsville Speedway, Phoenix International Raceway
2016	5	Jimmie Johnson (5)	Atlanta Motor Speedway, Auto Club Speedway, Charlotte Motor Speedway, Martinsville Speedway, Homestead-Miami Speedway
2017	4	Jimmie Johnson (3), Kasey Kahne (1)	Texas Motor Speedway, Bristol Motor Speedway, Dover International Speedway, Indianapolis Motor Speedway
2018	3	Chase Elliott (3)	Watkins Glen International, Dover International Speedway, Kansas Speedway
2019	4	Chase Elliott (3), Alex Bowman (1)	Talladega Superspeedway, Chicagoland Speedway, Watkins Glen International, Charlotte Roval
2020	7	Chase Elliott (5), Alex Bowman (1), William Byron (1)	Auto Club Speedway, Charlotte Motor Speedway, Daytona Road Course, Daytona International Speedway, Charlotte Roval, Martinsville Speedway, Phoenix Raceway
2021	17	Kyle Larson (10), Alex Bowman (4), Chase Elliott (2), William Byron (1)	Homestead-Miami Speedway, Las Vegas Motor Speedway, Richmond Raceway, Dover International Speedway, Circuit of the Americas, Charlotte Motor Speedway, Sonoma Raceway, Nashville Superspeedway, Pocono Raceway, Road America, Watkins Glen International, Bristol Motor Speedway, Charlotte Roval, Texas Motor Speedway, Kansas Speedway, Martinsville Speedway, Phoenix Raceway
2022	11	Chase Elliott (5), Kyle Larson (3), William Byron (2), Alex Bowman (1)	Auto Club Speedway, Las Vegas Motor Speedway, Atlanta Motor Speedway (1 & 2), Martinsville Speedway, Dover Motor Speedway, Nashville Superspeedway, Pocono Raceway, Watkins Glen International, Talladega Superspeedway, Homestead-Miami Speedway
2023	10	William Byron (6), Kyle Larson (4)	Las Vegas Motor Speedway (1 & 2), Phoenix Raceway, Richmond Raceway, Martinsville Speedway, Darlington Raceway (1 & 2), Atlanta Motor Speedway, Watkins Glen International, Texas Motor Speedway
2024	11	Kyle Larson (6), William Byron (3), Chase Elliott (1), Alex Bowman (1)	Daytona International Speedway, Las Vegas Motor Speedway, Circuit of the Americas, Martinsville Speedway, Texas Motor Speedway, Kansas Speedway, Sonoma Raceway, Chicago Street Course, Indianapolis Motor Speedway, Bristol Motor Speedway, Charlotte Roval
2025	8	Kyle Larson (3), William Byron (3), Chase Elliott (2)	Daytona International Speedway, Homestead–Miami Speedway, Bristol Motor Speedway, Kansas Speedway (1 & 2), Atlanta Motor Speedway, Iowa Speedway, Martinsville Speedway
2026	6	Kyle Larson (3), Chase Elliott (2) , William Byron (1)	Martinsville Speedway (1 & 2), Texas Motor Speedway, World Wide Technology Raceway, Kansas Speedway, Talladega Superspeedway

== O'Reilly Auto Parts Series ==
Rick Hendrick's first NASCAR win came in 1983 in the then-Sportsman Series at Charlotte Motor Speedway with Dale Earnhardt driving. Hendrick had purchased a stake in the team with Robert Gee as the primary owner.

Hendrick Motorsports fielded entries in the renamed Busch Series from 1984 to 1990, and again from 2000 to 2007. In 2003, Ricky Hendrick was listed as the primary owner of the No. 5, which Brian Vickers drove to three victories and the 2003 series championship. Following the conclusion of the 2007 season, Hendrick and JR Motorsports (owned by Dale Earnhardt Jr.) officially combined then-Xfinity Series operations. The No. 5 Chevrolet began running full-time under the JR Motorsports banner in 2008, and the team received engines and technical support from Hendrick. With the merger, Rick Hendrick became a part owner in the team. Hendrick Motorsports returned to the series in 2009 to field the No. 80 for Tony Stewart at Daytona, which Stewart drove to Hendrick's 26th and final victory in the series at the time.

On June 2, 2022, Hendrick Motorsports announced it would field the No. 17 in three Xfinity races in 2022, with Kyle Larson running at Road America, Alex Bowman at Indianapolis, and William Byron at Watkins Glen. This marked Hendrick Motorsports' return to the Xfinity Series after Tony Stewart won for the team at Daytona in 2009.

For 2023, Hendrick Motorsports announced that for the second year in a row, it would field the No. 17 in four races in 2023, with Byron running at Circuit of the Americas, Larson at Sonoma and Darlington, and Bowman at Watkins Glen. On July 12, Hendrick Motorsports added a fifth race to their Xfinity schedule, with Elliott driving the No. 17 at Pocono. On September 26, two further races were added to the No. 17 schedule, with Boris Said competing at the Charlotte Roval and Rajah Caruth competing in the season finale at Phoenix.

For 2024, a ten–race schedule was announced on February 27, 2024, with Cup Byron, Larson, Bowman and Chase Elliott all competing in at least one race, with Said also competing for the team at Sonoma. The organization claimed their first win in the Xfinity Series since 2009 with Larson at the Circuit of the Americas after overtaking a dueling Shane van Gisbergen and Austin Hill on the final lap. Elliott took the No. 17 to victory lane at Charlotte.

In 2025, the team announced a sixteen-race schedule, with newly signed development driver Corey Day serving as the anchor driver, competing in ten races for the team, while the remaining six races being split between Byron, Bowman, Larson and Elliott. Larson took the No. 17 car to victory lane at Bristol, while Byron won at Charlotte. The team added a second race for Elliott at Pocono. On July 14, the team announced Jake Finch would make his Xfinity Series debut at Dover. Larson made a third start for the team at Indianapolis.

For 2026, it was announced Corey Day would move to full time role for the season. He started the season with a 27th place DNF at Daytona. After a streak of eight consecutive top ten finishes, he scored his first career win at Talladega. He scored his second career win at Dover. During "The Chase", Day won at Las Vegas from the pole position and again the next week at Charlotte.

=== O'Reilly Auto Parts Series wins ===
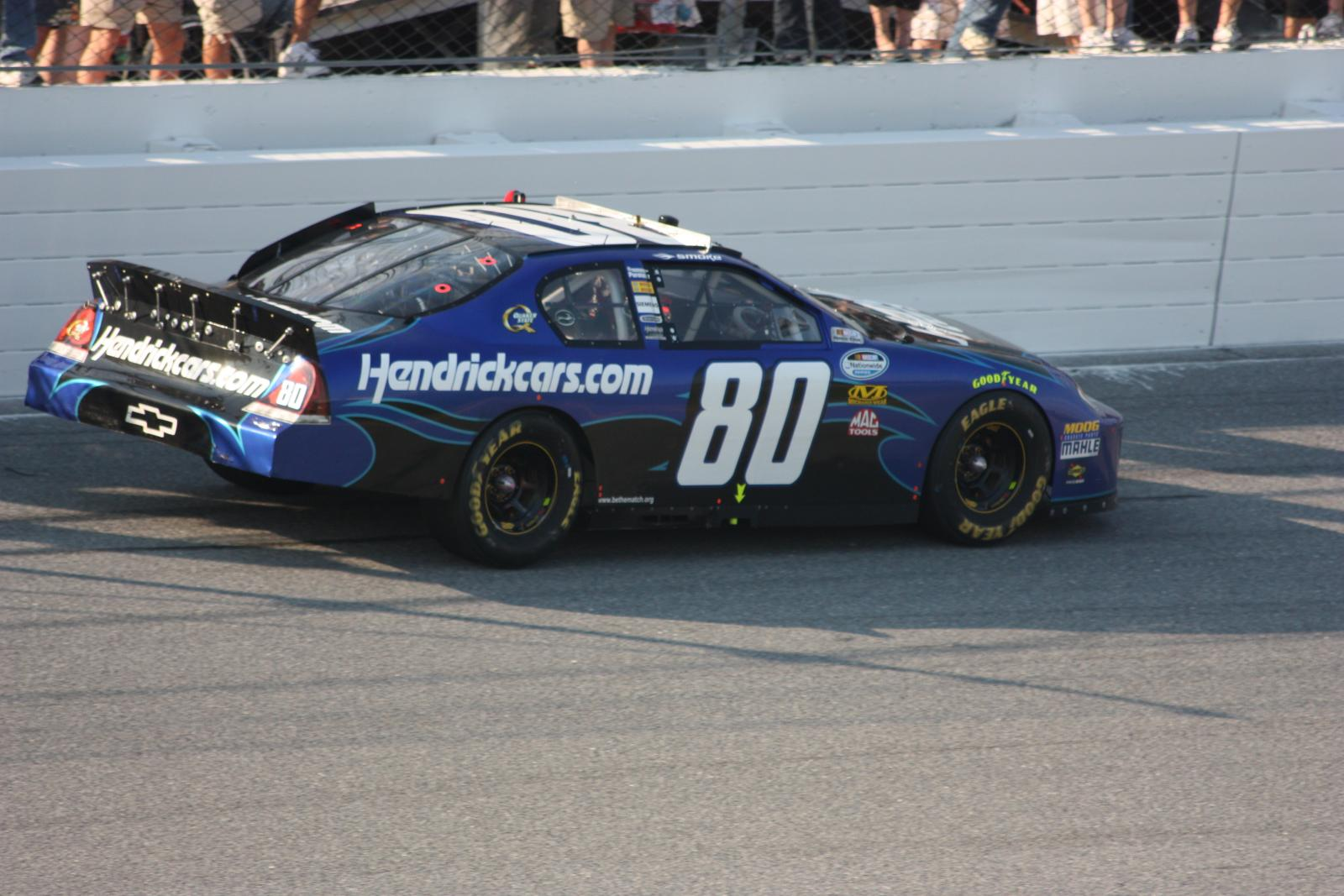
Tony Stewart (Daytona, 2009)

Corey Day (Las Vegas, 2026)

. – Hendrick won driver's championship

NASCAR O'Reilly Auto Parts Series victories
No.	Date	Season	Car #	Driver	Race	Track
1	October 20, 1984	1984	15	Geoff Bodine	Komfort Koach 200	North Carolina Motor Speedway
2	February 16, 1985	1985	5	Geoff Bodine	Goody's 300	Daytona International Speedway
3	April 6, 1985	1985	5	Brett Bodine	Miller 200	Martinsville Speedway
4	May 25, 1985	1985	15	Tim Richmond	Winn-Dixie 300	Charlotte Motor Speedway
5	August 23, 1985	1985	5	Brett Bodine	Tri-City Pontiac 200	Bristol Motor Speedway
6	October 19, 1985	1985	5	Brett Bodine	Sandhills 200	North Carolina Motor Speedway
7	May 24, 1986	1986	15	Tim Richmond	Winn-Dixie 300	Charlotte Motor Speedway
8	February 14, 1987	1987	15	Geoff Bodine	Goody's 300	Daytona International Speedway
9	March 26, 1988	1988	15	Geoff Bodine	Country Squire 200	Darlington Raceway
10	April 1, 1989	1989	15	Geoff Bodine	Country Squire 200	Darlington Raceway
– (Note: Jeff Gordon won the 2000 Miami 300 under the JG Motorsports banner with Rick Hendrick listed as part owner.)	November 11, 2000	2000	24	Jeff Gordon	Miami 300	Homestead–Miami Speedway
11	June 8, 2002	2002	24	Jack Sprague	Inside Traxx 300	Nashville Superspeedway
12	August 2, 2003	2003 (Note: Vickers' entry in 2003 season was entered under the Hendrick Motorsports banner with Ricky Hendrick listed as owner.)	5	Brian Vickers	Kroger 200	Indianapolis Raceway Park
13	August 30, 2003	2003	5	Brian Vickers	Winn-Dixie 200	Darlington Raceway
14	September 20, 2003	2003	5	Brian Vickers	Stacker 200	Dover International Speedway
15	May 14, 2004	2004	5	Kyle Busch	Funai 250	Richmond International Raceway
16	May 29, 2004	2004	5	Kyle Busch	Carquest Auto Parts 300	Lowe's Motor Speedway
17	June 19, 2004	2004	5	Kyle Busch	Meijer 300	Kentucky Speedway
18	August 7, 2004	2004	5	Kyle Busch	Kroger 200	Indianapolis Raceway Park
19	August 21, 2004	2004	5	Kyle Busch	Cabela's 250	Michigan International Speedway
20	May 28, 2005	2005	5	Kyle Busch	CarQuest Auto Parts 300	Lowe's Motor Speedway
21	March 25, 2006	2006	5	Kyle Busch	Sharpie Mini 300	Bristol Motor Speedway
22	July 7, 2007	2007	5	Kyle Busch	Winn Dixie 250	Daytona International Speedway
23	September 7, 2007	2007	5	Kyle Busch	Emerson Radio 250	Richmond International Raceway
24	September 29, 2007	2007	5	Kyle Busch	Yellow Transportation 300	Kansas Speedway
25	November 10, 2007	2007	5	Kyle Busch	Arizona Travel 200	Phoenix International Raceway
26 (Note: Beginning in 2008, with the exception of Daytona 2009, all Xfinity series entries and race wins are under the JR Motorsports banner with Rick Hendrick listed as part owner.)	February 14, 2009	2009	80	Tony Stewart	Camping World 300	Daytona International Speedway
27 (Note: Beginning in 2022, Hendrick Motorsports began fielding an Xfinity series team on a part-time basis.)	March 23, 2024	2024	17	Kyle Larson	Focused Health 250	Circuit of the Americas
28	May 25, 2024	2024	17	Chase Elliott	BetMGM 300	Charlotte Motor Speedway
29	April 12, 2025	2025	17	Kyle Larson	SciAps 300	Bristol Motor Speedway
30	May 24, 2025	2025	17	William Byron	BetMGM 300	Charlotte Motor Speedway
31	April 25, 2026	2026	17	Corey Day	Ag-Pro 300	Talladega Superspeedway
32	May 16, 2026	2026	17	Corey Day	BetRivers 200	Dover Motor Speedway
33	October 3, 2026	2026	17	Corey Day	Focused Health 302	Las Vegas Motor Speedway
34	October 11, 2026	2026	17	Corey Day	Blue Cross NC 300	Charlotte Motor Speedway

=== Wins by driver ===
NASCAR O'Reilly Auto Parts Series victories by driver
Driver	Wins	First Win	Last Win
Kyle Busch	11	2004	2007
Geoff Bodine	5	1984	1989
Corey Day	4	2026	2026
Brett Bodine	3	1985	1985
Brian Vickers	3	2003	2003
Tim Richmond	2	1985	1986
Kyle Larson	2	2024	2025
Jack Sprague	1	2002	2002
Tony Stewart	1	2009	2009
Chase Elliott	1	2024	2024
William Byron	1	2025	2025

=== Wins by track ===
Hendrick has won on 17 different tracks in the series, with JG Motorsports winning at Homestead–Miami Speedway in 2000 with Rick Hendrick as part owner. The team won six times at Charlotte Motor Speedway and four times at Daytona International Speedway. Hendrick's first road course win in the O'Reilly Auto Parts Series was at Circuit of the Americas in 2024.

NASCAR O'Reilly Auto Parts Series victories by racetrack
Order	Track	Wins	First Win	Last Win
1	Charlotte Motor Speedway	7	1985	2026
2	Daytona International Speedway	4	1985	2009
3	Darlington Raceway	3	1988	2003
3	Bristol Motor Speedway	3	1985	2025
5	North Carolina Motor Speedway	2	1984	1985
5	Indianapolis Raceway Park	2	2003	2004
5	Richmond International Raceway	2	2004	2007
5	Dover Motor Speedway	2	2003	2026
8	Martinsville Speedway	1	1985	1985
8	Homestead–Miami Speedway	1	2000	2000
8	Nashville Superspeedway	1	2002	2002
8	Kentucky Speedway	1	2004	2004
8	Michigan International Speedway	1	2004	2004
8	Kansas Speedway	1	2007	2007
8	Phoenix International Raceway	1	2007	2007
8	Circuit of the Americas	1	2024	2024
8	Talladega Superspeedway	1	2026	2026
8	Las Vegas Motor Speedway	1	2026	2026

== Truck Series ==
Hendrick Motorsports fielded full time entries in the NASCAR Truck Series from the inaugural season in 1995 to the 2001 season, winning a total of 26 races. Terry Labonte won the first race for the organization at Richmond. Jack Sprague in the No. 24 won 23 races and 3 series championships (1997, 1999, 2001) with the team, while Ricky Hendrick added a win in 2001 at Kansas. Hendrick returned to fielding a truck part-time in 2013 for Chase Elliott, with Elliott scoring a win driving the No. 94 truck.

=== Truck Series wins ===
. – Hendrick won driver's championship

NASCAR Truck Series victories
No.	Date	Season	Car #	Driver	Race	Track
1	September 7, 1995	1995	5	Terry Labonte	Fas Mart Supertruck Shootout	Richmond International Raceway
2	April 21, 1996	1996	24	Jack Sprague	Chevy Desert Star Classic	Phoenix International Raceway
3	June 30, 1996	1996	24	Jack Sprague	DeVilbiss Superfinish 200	Nazareth Speedway
4	July 6, 1996	1996	24	Jack Sprague	Sears Auto Center 200	Milwaukee Mile
5	October 26, 1996	1996	24	Jack Sprague	GM Goodwrench/AC Delco 300	Phoenix International Raceway
6	November 3, 1996	1996	24	Jack Sprague	Carquest 420K	Las Vegas Motor Speedway
7	April 20, 1997	1997	24	Jack Sprague	Chevy Desert Star Classic	Phoenix International Raceway
8	June 29, 1997	1997	24	Jack Sprague	NAPA Autocare 200	Nazareth Speedway
9	August 16, 1997	1997	24	Jack Sprague	Federated Auto Parts 250	Nashville Fairgrounds Speedway
10	May 9, 1998	1998	24	Jack Sprague	NAPACARD 200	Evergreen Speedway
11	July 18, 1998	1998	24	Jack Sprague	The No Fear Challenge	California Speedway
12	July 30, 1998	1998	24	Jack Sprague	Cummins 200	Indianapolis Raceway Park
13	September 10, 1998	1998	24	Jack Sprague	Virginia Is For Lovers 200	Richmond International Raceway
14	November 8, 1998	1998	24	Jack Sprague	Sam's Town 250	Las Vegas Motor Speedway
15	May 22, 1999	1999	24	Jack Sprague	O'Reilly Auto Parts 200	I-70 Speedway
16	June 5, 1999	1999	24	Jack Sprague	Coca-Cola Family 200	Bristol Motor Speedway
17	October 30, 1999	1999	24	Jack Sprague	NAPA Auto Parts 200	California Speedway
18	May 7, 2000	2000	24	Jack Sprague	Ram Tough 200	Gateway International Raceway
19	May 13, 2000	2000	24	Jack Sprague	Quaker State 200	Memphis Motorsports Park
20	June 3, 2000	2000	24	Jack Sprague	Sears 200	Evergreen Speedway
21	June 8, 2001	2001	24	Jack Sprague	O'Reilly 400K	Texas Motor Speedway
22	July 7, 2001	2001	17	Ricky Hendrick	O'Reilly Auto Parts 250	Kansas Speedway
23	July 21, 2001	2001	24	Jack Sprague	New England 200	New Hampshire International Speedway
24	August 3, 2001	2001	24	Jack Sprague	Power Stroke Diesel 200	Indianapolis Raceway Park
25	September 6, 2001	2001	24	Jack Sprague	Kroger 200	Richmond International Raceway
26	September 1, 2013	2013	94	Chase Elliott	Chevrolet Silverado 250	Canadian Tire Motorsports Park

=== Wins by track ===
Hendrick won on 17 different tracks in the truck series, including winning at Richmond and Phoenix three times.

NASCAR Truck Series victories by racetrack
Order	Track	Wins	First Win	Last Win
1	Richmond International Raceway	3	1995	2001
1	Phoenix International Raceway	3	1996	1997
3	Las Vegas Motor Speedway	2	1996	1998
3	Nazareth Speedway	2	1996	1997
3	California Speedway	2	1998	1999
3	Evergreen Speedway	2	1998	2000
3	Indianapolis Raceway Park	2	1998	2001
8	Milwaukee Mile	1	1996	1996
8	Nashville Fairgrounds Speedway	1	1997	1997
8	Bristol Motor Speedway	1	1999	1999
8	I-70 Speedway	1	1999	1999
8	Gateway International Raceway	1	2000	2000
8	Memphis Motorsports Park	1	2000	2000
8	Kansas Speedway	1	2001	2001
8	New Hampshire International Speedway	1	2001	2001
8	Texas Motor Speedway	1	2001	2001
8	Canadian Tire Motorsports Park	1	2013	2013

== ARCA Series ==
In 2003, Hendrick fielded Kyle Busch in the ARCA RE/MAX Series for seven races. Busch drove the No. 87 Ditech.com Chevrolet to three poles and two wins. Busch ran the 2004 season opener at Daytona, winning the race after starting second.

Later in 2004, development drivers Blake Feese, Boston Reid, and Kyle Krisiloff ran a combined ten races in ARCA in the No. 5, No. 6, and No. 7 cars fielded by Bobby Gerhart Racing under the Hendrick Motorsports banner. Feese scored a win at Nashville, while Krisiloff scored a victory at Chicagoland Speedway. Later that season, Feese ran a single race in the No. 94 Carquest Auto Parts Chevrolet out of the Hendrick stable at Talladega, scoring another victory.

In 2013, Chase Elliott won at Pocono Raceway driving for his father Bill in a car fielded out of the Hendrick stable.

=== ARCA Series wins ===
ARCA Series victories
No.	Date	Season	Car #	Driver	Race	Track
1	April 11, 2003	2003	87	Kyle Busch	PFG Lester 150	Nashville Superspeedway
2	May 10, 2003	2003	87	Kyle Busch	The Channel 5 205	Kentucky Speedway
3	February 7, 2004	2004	87	Kyle Busch	Advance Discount Auto Parts 200	Daytona International Speedway
4	April 9, 2004	2004	5	Blake Feese	PFG Lester 150	Nashville Superspeedway
5	September 11, 2004	2004	5	Kyle Krisiloff	ReadyHosting.com 200	Chicagoland Speedway
6	October 2, 2004	2004	94	Blake Feese	Food World 300	Talladega Superspeedway
7 (Note: Entry was entered under the Hendrick Motorsports banner with Bill Elliott listed as owner.)	June 8, 2013	2013	9	Chase Elliott	Pocono ARCA 200	Pocono Raceway

== All-time statistics ==
As of 11/9/26 – Includes NASCAR's Cup Series, O'Reilly Auto Parts Series, Truck Series, and ARCA Series races

- Races Completed: 2,031
  - Cup Series: 1,453; O'Reilly Auto Parts Series: 344; Truck Series: 180; ARCA Series: 54
- Wins: 393
  - Cup Series: 326; O'Reilly Auto Parts Series: 34; Truck Series: 26; ARCA Series: 7
- Poles: 335
  - Cup Series: 259; O'Reilly Auto Parts Series: 46; Truck Series: 22; ARCA Series: 8
- Championships: 20
  - Cup Series: 16; O'Reilly Auto Parts Series: 1; Truck Series: 3; ARCA Series: 0

== See also ==
- List of all-time NASCAR Cup Series winners
- List of NASCAR race wins by Petty Enterprises
- List of NASCAR race wins by Joe Gibbs Racing
- List of NASCAR race wins by Kyle Busch
- List of NASCAR race wins by Jeff Gordon
- List of NASCAR race wins by Jimmie Johnson
