= Papa Joe Hendrick =

American stock car racing team owner (1919–2004)

- Born: Joseph Riddick Hendrick Jr. October 29, 1919; Palmer Springs, Virginia, U.S.
- Died: July 14, 2004 (aged 84); Charlotte, North Carolina, U.S.
- Occupation: Stock car racing team owner
- Known for: NASCAR team ownership and involvement with Hendrick Motorsports
- Spouse: Mary Hendrick
- Children: Rick Hendrick, John Hendrick
- Relatives: Ricky Hendrick (grandson)

Joseph Riddick Hendrick Jr. (October 29, 1919 – July 14, 2004), commonly known as "Papa Joe" Hendrick, was an American stock car racing team owner associated with modified racing in Virginia and Hendrick Motorsports in the NASCAR Cup Series and Busch Series. He co-owned the No. 25 NASCAR Cup Series team and the No. 5 Busch Series team with his grandson, Ricky Hendrick. He was the father of Hendrick Motorsports founder Rick Hendrick and former company president John Hendrick.

Hendrick began his involvement in auto racing in the early 1960s. He was associated with modified stock car racing teams in Virginia before becoming involved with Hendrick Motorsports following its founding in 1984. At Hendrick Motorsports, he also oversaw the organization's show-car operations.

== Early life and military service ==
Hendrick was born on October 29, 1919, in Palmer Springs, Virginia. He grew up in a farming family and developed an interest in automobiles and racing.

During World War II, he served in the United States Army Air Forces as a flight engineer and gunner. Following his military service, he returned to southern Virginia, where he farmed approximately 500 acres, raising crops including soybeans, cotton and corn, as well as cattle. He also worked as a supervisor at Burlington Mills.

== Early racing involvement ==
Hendrick became involved in organized stock car racing during the early 1960s. Working with longtime friend Frank Edwards, he participated in modified racing operations in Virginia. Their racing involvement included events at South Boston Speedway, Martinsville Speedway and Richmond, Virginia.

Hendrick also worked with modified racing driver Ray Hendrick, who was not related to the Hendrick family. According to contemporary reporting preserved by Jayski, Hendrick fielded a modified racing car driven by Ray Hendrick, with the team winning races at several Virginia tracks.

Both Papa Joe and his son Rick also served as volunteer crew members for Ray Hendrick during the 1960s. Their association with the driver was noted by NASCAR in 2017 when Denny Hamlin unveiled a throwback paint scheme inspired by Ray Hendrick's well-known No. 11 modified race car.

== Hendrick Motorsports ==
After retiring from farming in 1979, Hendrick relocated to Charlotte, North Carolina, where he worked with his sons Rick and John in the retail automobile business at City Chevrolet.

In 1984, Rick Hendrick founded Hendrick Motorsports. Papa Joe subsequently became involved in the racing organization, eventually sharing ownership of the No. 25 NASCAR Cup Series team and the No. 5 NASCAR Busch Series team with his grandson Ricky Hendrick. In addition to his team ownership, he was responsible for the organization's day-to-day show-car activities.

During the early 2000s, Hendrick was recognized as the owner of the No. 25 Chevrolet competing in NASCAR's premier series. In December 2002, racing coverage identified him as the team owner when Joe Nemechek was the car's driver.

On May 3, 2003, Joe Nemechek won the Pontiac Excitement 400 at Richmond International Raceway in the No. 25 Chevrolet. During a subsequent NASCAR teleconference, Nemechek specifically acknowledged Papa Joe Hendrick, explaining that winning in the car was particularly meaningful because of the team's previous struggles.

In 2004, contemporary reporting continued to identify Hendrick and grandson Ricky as co-owners of the No. 25 Cup Series and No. 5 Busch Series organizations.

== Recognition and legacy ==
=== Order of the Long Leaf Pine ===
On June 1, 2004, North Carolina governor Mike Easley presented Papa Joe Hendrick and his wife Mary with the Order of the Long Leaf Pine, a state honor recognizing service and contributions to North Carolina.

The presentation was held at Hendrick Motorsports headquarters before approximately 450 employees. NASCAR drivers Jimmie Johnson and Ken Schrader participated in the ceremony and spoke about Hendrick's contributions to the organization.

=== Papa Joe Hendrick Boulevard ===
The road serving the Hendrick Motorsports racing complex in Concord, North Carolina, was named Papa Joe Hendrick Boulevard in his honor.

The street's name was documented in an October 29, 2004, Los Angeles Times report by journalist Ellen Barry concerning the Hendrick family and the NASCAR community. The article described the naming of a main road within the complex as a tribute to the family's father.

The roadway continues to serve the organization's headquarters and racing facilities, including the main Hendrick Motorsports campus at 4400 Papa Joe Hendrick Boulevard.

=== Joe Hendrick Center for Automotive Technology ===
In April 2004, The Charlotte Observer reported that Rick Hendrick had donated $1 million toward construction of the Joe Hendrick Center for Automotive Technology at Central Piedmont Community College in Matthews, North Carolina. The training facility was named in recognition of his father and his longstanding involvement in the automotive and racing industries.

The college opened the center in 2006 at its Levine Campus. In a June 2024 announcement, Central Piedmont Community College confirmed that the facility was named for Joseph R. Hendrick Jr. and reported that it served more than 3,000 students and working automotive technicians annually.

=== Papa Joe Hendrick Award of Excellence ===
Hendrick Motorsports maintains an internal employee recognition award named the Papa Joe Hendrick Award of Excellence.

The organization's annual employee recognition program dates to 1995. Contemporary racing coverage reported that an existing award was renamed in Papa Joe's honor in 2002, with competition director Ken Howes receiving the newly named award that year.

The award recognizes Hendrick Motorsports personnel for qualities including teamwork, leadership, integrity, accountability and dedication to the organization. Hendrick Motorsports has continued presenting it after his death.

In August 2026, the organization announced that crew chief Cliff Daniels and car chief Jesse Saunders had received the 2025 Papa Joe Hendrick Award of Excellence.

The Hendrick Motorsports campus also contains a Papa Joe Hendrick Meeting Center, referenced in the organization's January 2026 coverage of the opening of the Atrium Health Motorsports Athletic Center.

== Personal life and death ==
Hendrick was married to Mary Hendrick. Their children included Rick Hendrick, the founder of Hendrick Motorsports, and John Hendrick, who served as president of the racing organization. His grandson Ricky Hendrick was also a professional racing driver and team owner.

Hendrick died on July 14, 2004, at Carolinas Medical Center in Charlotte, North Carolina, following a battle with cancer. He was 84 years old.
