= Frank Edwards (motorsports) =

American motorsports fabricator and mechanic (1936–2025)

- Born: Benjamin Franklin Edwards; December 7, 1936
- Died: October 26, 2025 (aged 88)
- Occupations: Fabricator; mechanic; crew chief; car owner
- Years active: 1950s–2000s
- Employer: Hendrick Motorsports
- Known for: Early employee at Hendrick Motorsports; crew chief for Ricky Hendrick’s late model team

Benjamin Franklin "Frank" Edwards (December 7, 1936 – October 26, 2025) was an American motorsports fabricator, mechanic, car owner, and crew chief. He was among the first employees of Hendrick Motorsports in 1984 and later served as Ricky Hendrick’s late model crew chief from 1997 to 2000.

== Career ==
Edwards built and owned the gold-and-black No. 98 modified and late model sportsman cars and competed on short tracks along the U.S. East Coast.

In 1984, Edwards joined Rick Hendrick’s new NASCAR Cup Series operation as one of its first five employees (then known as All-Star Racing), working as a fabricator and mechanic during the team’s formative years. He later served as crew chief for Ricky Hendrick’s late model program from 1997 to 2000 and remained with Hendrick Motorsports for 29 years.

== Death and legacy ==
Edwards died on October 26, 2025, at the age of 88.

Within Hendrick Motorsports and the broader short-track community, Edwards was regarded for his technical skill and mentorship.
