= JG Motorsports =

Former NASCAR team

- Owner(s): Jeff Gordon; Rick Hendrick
- Base: Denver, North Carolina
- Series: NASCAR Busch Series
- Race drivers: Jeff Gordon; Ricky Hendrick
- Manufacturer: Chevrolet
- Opened: 1999
- Closed: 2000

Career
- Drivers' Championships: 0
- Race victories: 2

JG Motorsports was a NASCAR Busch Series race team co-owned by Jeff Gordon and Rick Hendrick, which attempted 20 races in the year 2000.

The team evolved from Gordon–Evernham Motorsports, which ran six races in the Busch Series in 1999.

== History ==
=== Gordon–Evernham Motorsports (1999) ===
In 1999, Brooke Gordon (then wife of Jeff Gordon) and Ray Evernham formed Gordon/Evernham Motorsports (GEM) to compete in that year's Busch Series season. The team's Pepsi-sponsored cars ran six races with Jeff Gordon as driver and Evernham as crew chief. DuPont sponsored the No. 24 car in two races in 1999 with driver Ricky Hendrick, with Evernham and Patrick Donahue as crew chiefs. During the season, Gordon won the Outback Steakhouse 200, the inaugural Busch Series race at Phoenix International Raceway.

Due to offers from Dodge, Evernham sold his half of GEM to Rick Hendrick at the end of the year.

=== JG Motorsports (2000) ===
The GEM cars competed in the 2000 NASCAR Busch Series under the title "JG Motorsports". The team was jointly owned by Jeff Gordon and Rick Hendrick and attempted 20 races in the year. The team ran sixteen races with Ricky Hendrick as driver and did not qualify for five of the sixteen. Pepsi stayed as sponsor for the five races Gordon drove and GMAC came on as sponsor for the races Ricky Hendrick drove. In the team's final race at Homestead-Miami Speedway, Gordon won the season finale after leading the final 71 laps.

=== Race statistics ===
(key) (Bold – Pole position awarded by qualifying time. Italics – Pole position earned by points standings or practice time. * – Most laps led.)

1999 (Gordon/Evernham Motorsports)
Round	Driver	Sponsor	Race	Location	Qualified	Result	Ref
3	Jeff Gordon	Pepsi	Sam's Town 300	Las Vegas Motor Speedway	2	4	
6	Jeff Gordon	Pepsi	Coca-Cola 300	Texas Motor Speedway	4	13	
14	Jeff Gordon	Pepsi/Star Wars: Episode I – The Phantom Menace	Carquest Auto Parts 300	Lowe's Motor Speedway	5	33	
19	Ricky Hendrick	DuPont	Myrtle Beach 250	Myrtle Beach Speedway	5	20	
23	Jeff Gordon	Pepsi	NAPA 200	Michigan International Speedway	4	2	
26	Ricky Hendrick	DuPont	Autolite Platinum 250	Richmond International Raceway	DNQ		
28	Jeff Gordon	Pepsi	All Pro Bumper to Bumper 300	Lowe's Motor Speedway	2	2	
29	Ricky Hendrick	DuPont	Kmart 200	North Carolina Speedway	33	37	
30	Ricky Hendrick	DuPont	Sam's Town 250	Memphis Motorsports Park	DNQ		
31	Jeff Gordon	Pepsi	Outback Steakhouse 200	Phoenix International Raceway	Cancelled	**1**	

2000 (JG Motorsports)
Round	Driver	Sponsor	Race	Location	Qualified	Result	Ref
2	Ricky Hendrick	GMAC	Alltel 200	North Carolina Speedway	DNQ		
3	Jeff Gordon	Pepsi	Sam's Town 300	Las Vegas Motor Speedway	27	18	
5	Ricky Hendrick	GMAC	SunCom 200	Darlington Raceway	DNQ		
7	Jeff Gordon	Pepsi	Albertsons 300	Texas Motor Speedway	31	42	
8	Ricky Hendrick	GMAC	BellSouth Mobility 320	Nashville Speedway USA	34	5	
11	Ricky Hendrick	GMAC	Hardee's 250	Richmond International Raceway	27	28	
12	Ricky Hendrick	GMAC	Busch 200	New Hampshire International Speedway	DNQ		
13	Jeff Gordon	Pepsi	CarQuest Auto Parts 300	Lowe's Motor Speedway	6	4	
15	Ricky Hendrick	GMAC	Textilease Medique 300	South Boston Speedway	35	42	
16	Ricky Hendrick	GMAC	Myrtle Beach 250	Myrtle Beach Speedway	9	13	
18	Ricky Hendrick	GMAC	Sears DieHard 250	Milwaukee Mile	DNQ		
20	Ricky Hendrick	GMAC	NAPA Auto Care 250	Pikes Peak International Raceway	28	26	
21	Ricky Hendrick	GMAC	CarQuest Auto Parts 250	Gateway International Raceway	37	38	
22	Ricky Hendrick	GMAC	Kroger 200	Indianapolis Raceway Park	30	36	
23	Jeff Gordon	Pepsi	NAPAonline 250	Michigan International Speedway	25	7	
24	Ricky Hendrick	GMAC	Food City 250	Bristol Motor Speedway	DNQ		
25	Ricky Hendrick	GMAC	Dura Lube 200	Darlington Raceway	32	29	
28	Ricky Hendrick	GMAC	All Pro Bumper to Bumper 300	Lowe's Motor Speedway	5	13	
29	Ricky Hendrick	GMAC	Sam's Club 200	North Carolina Speedway	7	39	
32	Jeff Gordon	Pepsi No. 24	Miami 300	Homestead-Miami Speedway	6	**1**	
32	Ricky Hendrick	GMAC No. 14	Miami 300	Homestead-Miami Speedway	12	39	
