= Lance McGrew =

NASCAR crew chief

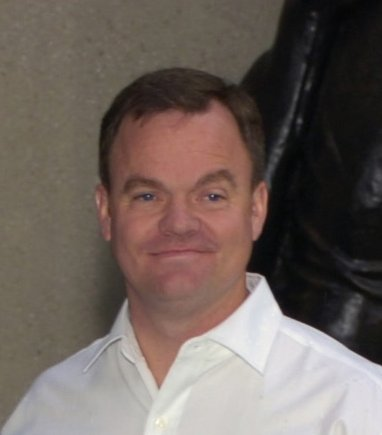
- McGrew in 2007

Personal information
- Born: December 15, 1967 (age 58)

Sport
- Country: United States
- Sport: NASCAR Sprint Cup Series
- Team: Hendrick Motorsports

Lance McGrew (born December 15, 1967) is an American former crew chief for Hendrick Motorsports and currently works in their research and development division.

== Early life ==
McGrew's passion for racing started when he just a kid growing up in Baton Rouge, Louisiana, and attending local dirt track races with his father, Les. McGrew broadened his racing knowledge at Louisiana State University where he majored in mechanical engineering.

== BACE Motorsports ==
McGrew moved to North Carolina in the early 1990s and joined the BACE Motorsports NASCAR Busch Series team driven by his future Hendrick Motorsports teammate, Jack Sprague. McGrew started by doing basic tasks such as sweeping the floors and washing the team transporter.

== Hendrick Motorsports ==
In 1999, McGrew joined Hendrick Motorsports as a crew member of the #24 Busch Series team with driver Jeff Gordon. In 2000, McGrew was named the Nationwide Series crew chief for the #24 Chevrolet, shared by Jeff Gordon and Ricky Hendrick during a limited schedule. Gordon captured the season-finale at Homestead-Miami Speedway in 2000, giving McGrew his first career win as a crew chief.

McGrew and Ricky Hendrick developed a good relationship during the 2000 season, and the duo was paired up again – this time for a full season in the Craftsman Truck Series in 2001. McGrew guided Hendrick and the No. 17 team to a win at Kansas Speedway in July of that year, making Hendrick, then 21, the youngest competitor in history to win a Truck Series event at the time. McGrew led the team to one win, eight top-five finishes and 19 top-10s.

In 2002, McGrew moved from the Truck Series to the Busch Series and became the crew chief for the #5 Hendrick Motorsports Chevrolet, which was to be driven by Hendrick. The team collected four top-five finishes and eight top-tens.

McGrew led Brian Vickers and the No. 5 Hendrick Motorsports team to win the 2003 Busch Series championship. The title was the first-ever in the Busch Series for Hendrick Motorsports. The No. 5 team finished the season with three wins, one pole position, 13 top-five finishes and 21 top-tens.

McGrew's Busch Series success as crew chief continued in 2004 with Kyle Busch, who drove the No. 5 Chevy full-time for Hendrick Motorsports. The team ended the season with five wins, five poles, 16 top-five finishes and 22 top-tens en route to a second-place finish in the championship standings. Busch won Rookie of the Year honors.

At the end of the 2004 season, McGrew was named crew chief of the No. 25 Hendrick Motorsports Chevrolet, which was driven by Vickers in the NASCAR Nextel Cup Series. McGrew helped lead the No. 25 Hendrick Motorsports team to its best season since 2001. The team finished 17th in the 2005 championship standings with five top-five finishes and ten top-tens.

In 2006, McGrew and the No. 25 team improved on their previous Cup season by recording a 15th-place finish in the championship standings with one win, one pole, five top-five finishes and nine top-tens.

In 2007, McGrew transitioned into a new role at Hendrick Motorsports. McGrew became the crew chief for Hendrick Motorsports research and development team, which played a major role in the organization's development of its Impala SS.

In addition to his duties as crew chief for Hendrick Motorsports R&D team, McGrew filled in as crew chief for the #5 JR Motorsports team in 2008 for six Nationwide Series races. In those six races, McGrew was able to guide the #5 team to Victory Lane at Las Vegas Motor Speedway in March with veteran Mark Martin.

Later in the 2008 season, McGrew once again played the crew chief role. This time it was for the young, up-and-coming driver Brad Keselowski, who made his first two career Sprint Cup Series starts in the No. 25 Hendrick Motorsports Chevy.

In 2009, McGrew won the NASCAR Nationwide Series season opening Camping World 300 at Daytona International Speedway as Tony Stewart's crew chief on the #80 Chevrolet. He then continued as crew chief of Brad Keselowski's Cup car. In his last race working with Keselowski, he earned a seventh-place finish in the Southern 500 at Darlington Raceway.

On May 28, 2009, it was announce McGrew would replace Tony Eury Jr. as crew chief on an interim basis for Dale Earnhardt Jr. Earnhardt Jr. finished twelfth at Dover. On October 30, 2009, McGrew was selected as Dale Earnhardt Jr.'s full-time crew chief for the 2010 season. In July 2011, Hendrick Motorsports announced that Kenny Francis would replace him as crew chief for the No. 5 car, as McGrew moves to K&N East to crew chief driver Chase Elliott.
