= Ricky Hendrick =

American racing driver and executive (1980–2004)

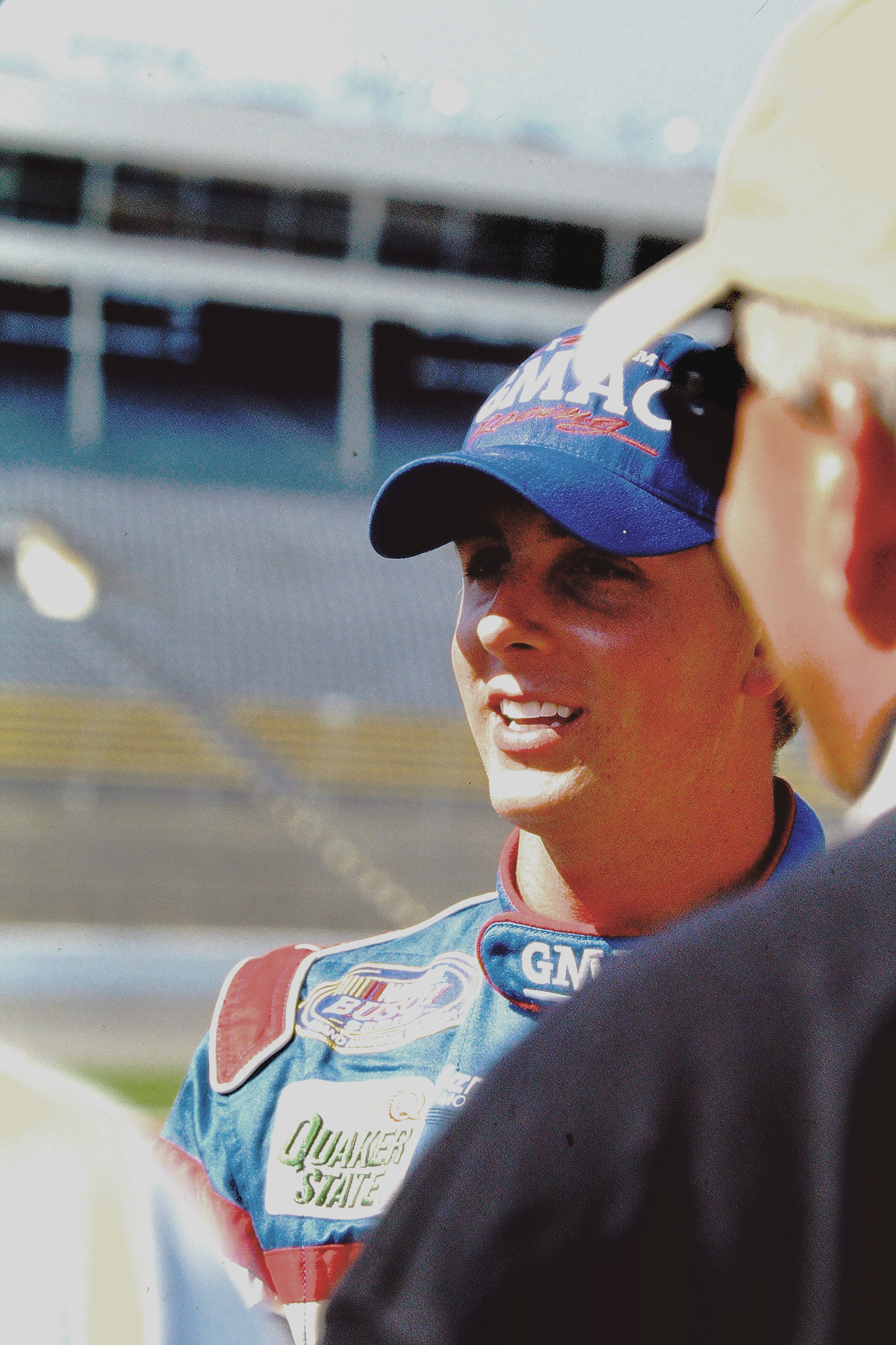
- Ricky Hendrick at Charlotte Motor Speedway - 2000
- Born: Joseph Riddick Hendrick IV; April 2, 1980; Charlotte, North Carolina, U.S.
- Died: October 24, 2004 (aged 24); Bull Mountain (near Martinsville), Virginia, U.S.
- Cause of death: Aircraft accident

NASCAR O'Reilly Auto Parts Series career
- 49 races run over 3 years
- Best finish: 28th (2002)
- First race: 1999 Myrtle Beach 250 (Myrtle Beach)
- Last race: 2002 Mr. Goodcents 300 (Kansas)
Wins	Top tens	Poles
0	3	0

NASCAR FedEx Freight Truck Series career
- 30 races run over 2 years
- Best finish: 6th (2001)
- First race: 2000 Grainger.com 200 (Pikes Peak)
- Last race: 2001 Auto Club 200 (Fontana)
- First win: 2001 O'Reilly Auto Parts 250 (Kansas)
Wins	Top tens	Poles
1	23	0

ARCA Menards Series career
- 2 races
Wins	Top tens	Poles
0	2	0

Joseph Riddick "Ricky" Hendrick IV (April 2, 1980 – October 24, 2004) was an American stock car racing driver and partial owner at Hendrick Motorsports, a NASCAR team that his father Rick Hendrick founded. He was born in Charlotte, North Carolina, on April 2, 1980, and began racing in Go Karts at a young age, then the Legends Series at fifteen. He competed in both the Busch Series and Craftsman Truck Series before his death from an airplane accident on October 24, 2004. He was killed with nine other family members and friends during the accident.

== Racing career ==
Hendrick began his racing career at the age of 15 in the Legends Series Summer Shootout with support from his grandfather Papa Joe Hendrick. In 1995, he won five races and finished second in the overall standings, and in 1996, he added one more victory and recorded multiple top-five finishes.

Hendrick moved into late models and won three NASCAR Winston Late Model Series races in 1998 and one in 1999; during this period (1997–2000) his late model team was crew-chiefed by longtime Hendrick Motorsports fabricator and mechanic Frank Edwards.

Hendrick competed in two ARCA Menards Series races — October 4, 2000, at Charlotte Motor Speedway and the 2001 Daytona event in February.

Hendrick continued to run late models in 2000 while adding select NASCAR Craftsman Truck Series starts in the No. 17 GMAC/Quaker State Chevrolet Silverado. He also made starts in the No. 24 Busch Series car but was involved in several accidents and suffered concussions.

In 2001, Hendrick ran the full Truck Series schedule. He earned his first NASCAR win at Kansas Speedway on July 7 — at the time, the youngest Truck Series race winner — and posted 19 top-ten finishes, then a rookie record. He finished second in Rookie of the Year to Travis Kvapil.

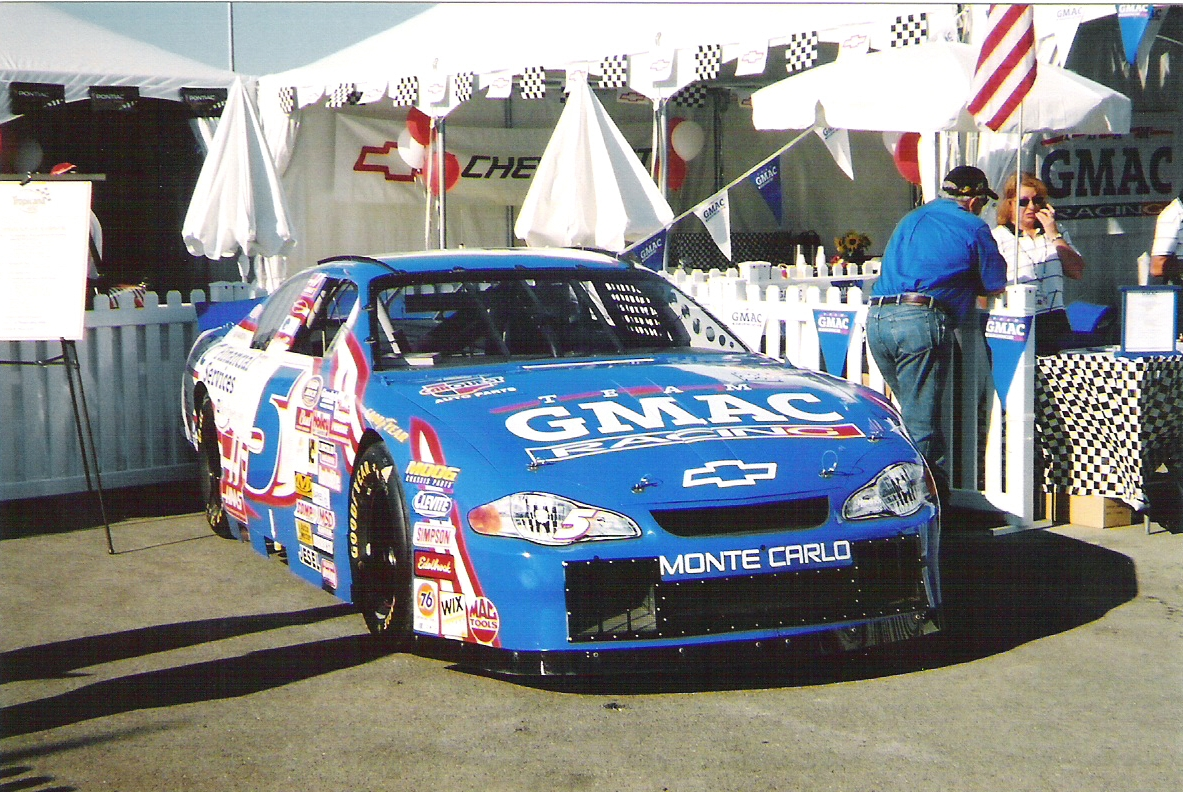
Hendrick's Busch Series car in 2002.

In 2002, Hendrick moved to the Busch Series with crew chief Lance McGrew driving the No. 5 GMAC Financial Chevrolet Monte Carlo. Hendrick suffered an accident in the third race of the season at Las Vegas Motor Speedway that resulted in a broken shoulder. He required surgery and missed six races before returning to competition in May.

Hendrick announced his retirement from driving on October 10, 2002, citing lingering effects of the shoulder injury he suffered at Las Vegas Motor Speedway. In a 2024 retrospective interview, his former crew chief Lance McGrew recalled that Hendrick experienced fear while driving after the accident and described him as having "some PTSD".

Hendrick continued working with Hendrick Motorsports after retiring from driving and subsequently served as a team owner for cars driven by Brian Vickers and Kyle Busch in the Busch Series. Hendrick also founded a motorcycle dealership in Pineville, North Carolina, named Ricky Hendrick's Performance Honda.

== Ownership and legacy ==
After retiring from driving, Hendrick remained at Hendrick Motorsports as a Busch Series team owner; his No. 5 team won the 2003 championship with Brian Vickers and fielded Kyle Busch in 2004. In April 2003, he launched Ricky Hendrick’s Performance Honda Suzuki Aprilia in Pineville, North Carolina.

In January 2006, Carolinas HealthCare System announced a US$3 million commitment from the Rick and Linda Hendrick family to benefit the new Levine Children’s Hospital; in recognition, the hospital dedicated its pediatric intensive care centers as the Ricky Hendrick Centers for Intensive Care.

=== Charity rides ===
From 2005 to 2008, the Ricky Hendrick Charity Ride (later the **Ricky Hendrick Memorial Charity Ride**) was held annually as a motorcycle benefit in the Charlotte area: April 17, 2005; April 23, 2006; May 6, 2007; and August 24, 2008. The inaugural event supported Nazareth Children’s Home and The Family Center; by 2007–2008, proceeds benefited the Hendrick Foundation for Children and went toward the Levine Children’s Hospital at Carolinas Medical Center.

== Death ==
On October 24, 2004, Hendrick was one of ten people killed when a Beechcraft King Air 200 operated for Hendrick Motorsports crashed into Bull Mountain near Martinsville, Virginia, while en route to the Subway 500 at Martinsville Speedway. The National Transportation Safety Board attributed the accident to flight-crew errors during an instrument approach in instrument meteorological conditions.

== Personal life ==
Hendrick was engaged to Emily Maynard. After his death, Maynard learned she was pregnant and gave birth to their daughter, Josephine Riddick "Ricki" Hendrick, who was born posthumously on June 29, 2005.

== Motorsports career results ==
=== NASCAR ===
(key) (Bold – Pole position awarded by qualifying time. Italics – Pole position earned by points standings or practice time. * – Most laps led.)

==== Busch Series ====
NASCAR Busch Series results
Year	Team	No.	Make	1	2	3	4	5	6	7	8	9	10	11	12	13	14	15	16	17	18	19	20	21	22	23	24	25	26	27	28	29	30	31	32	33	34	NBSC	Pts	Ref
1999	Gordon/Evernham Motorsports	24	Chevy	DAY	CAR	LVS	ATL	DAR	TEX	NSV	BRI	TAL	CAL	NHA	RCH	NZH	CLT	DOV	SBO	GLN	MLW	MYB; 20	PPR	GTY	IRP	MCH	BRI	DAR	RCH; DNQ	DOV	CLT	CAR; 37	MEM; DNQ	PHO	HOM			92nd	155	
2000	JG Motorsports	24	Chevy	DAY	CAR; DNQ	LVS	ATL	DAR; DNQ	BRI	TEX	NSV; 5	TAL	CAL	RCH; 28	NHA; DNQ	CLT	DOV	SBO; 42	MYB; 13	GLN	MLW; DNQ	NZH	PPR; 26	GTY; 38	IRP; 36	MCH	BRI; DNQ	DAR; 29	RCH	DOV	CLT; 13	CAR; 39	MEM	PHO				49th	876	
2000	JG Motorsports	14	Chevy																																HOM; 39			49th	876	
2001	Hendrick Motorsports	24	Chevy	DAY	CAR	LVS	ATL	DAR	BRI	TEX	NSH	TAL	CAL	RCH	NHA	NZH	CLT; 18	DOV	KEN; 15	MLW	GLN	CHI	GTY	PPR	IRP	MCH	BRI	DAR	RCH	DOV	KAN	CLT	MEM	PHO	CAR	HOM; 41		75th	267	
2002	Hendrick Motorsports	5	Chevy	DAY; 27	CAR; 21	LVS; 37	DAR	BRI	TEX	NSH	TAL	CAL	RCH; 15	NHA; 15	NZH; 30	CLT; 22	DOV; 25	NSH; 15	KEN; 8	MLW; 15	DAY; 20	CHI; 21	GTY; 24	PPR; 22	IRP; 7	MCH; 23	BRI; 29	DAR; 33	RCH; 17	DOV; 27	KAN; 38	CLT	MEM	ATL	CAR	PHO	HOM	28th	2125	

==== Craftsman Truck Series ====
NASCAR Craftsman Truck Series results
Year	Team	No.	Make	1	2	3	4	5	6	7	8	9	10	11	12	13	14	15	16	17	18	19	20	21	22	23	24	NCTC	Pts	Ref
2000	Hendrick Motorsports	17	Chevy	DAY	HOM	PHO	MMR	MAR	PIR	GTY	MEM	PPR; 6	EVG	TEX	KEN	GLN	MLW	NHA; 7	NZH	MCH	IRP; 12	NSV; 9	CIC	RCH; DNQ	DOV; 25	TEX; 8	CAL	30th	846	
2001	Hendrick Motorsports	17	Chevy	DAY; 2	HOM; 5	MMR; 8	MAR; 9	GTY; 6	DAR; 34	PPR; 5	DOV; 3	TEX; 5	MEM; 7	MLW; 10	KAN; 1	KEN; 6	NHA; 4	IRP; 18	NSH; 11	CIC; 11	NZH; 5	RCH; 8	SBO; 6	TEX; 8	LVS; 6	PHO; 28	CAL; 10	6th	3412	
