= Rick Hendrick =

American racing driver and team owner (born 1949)

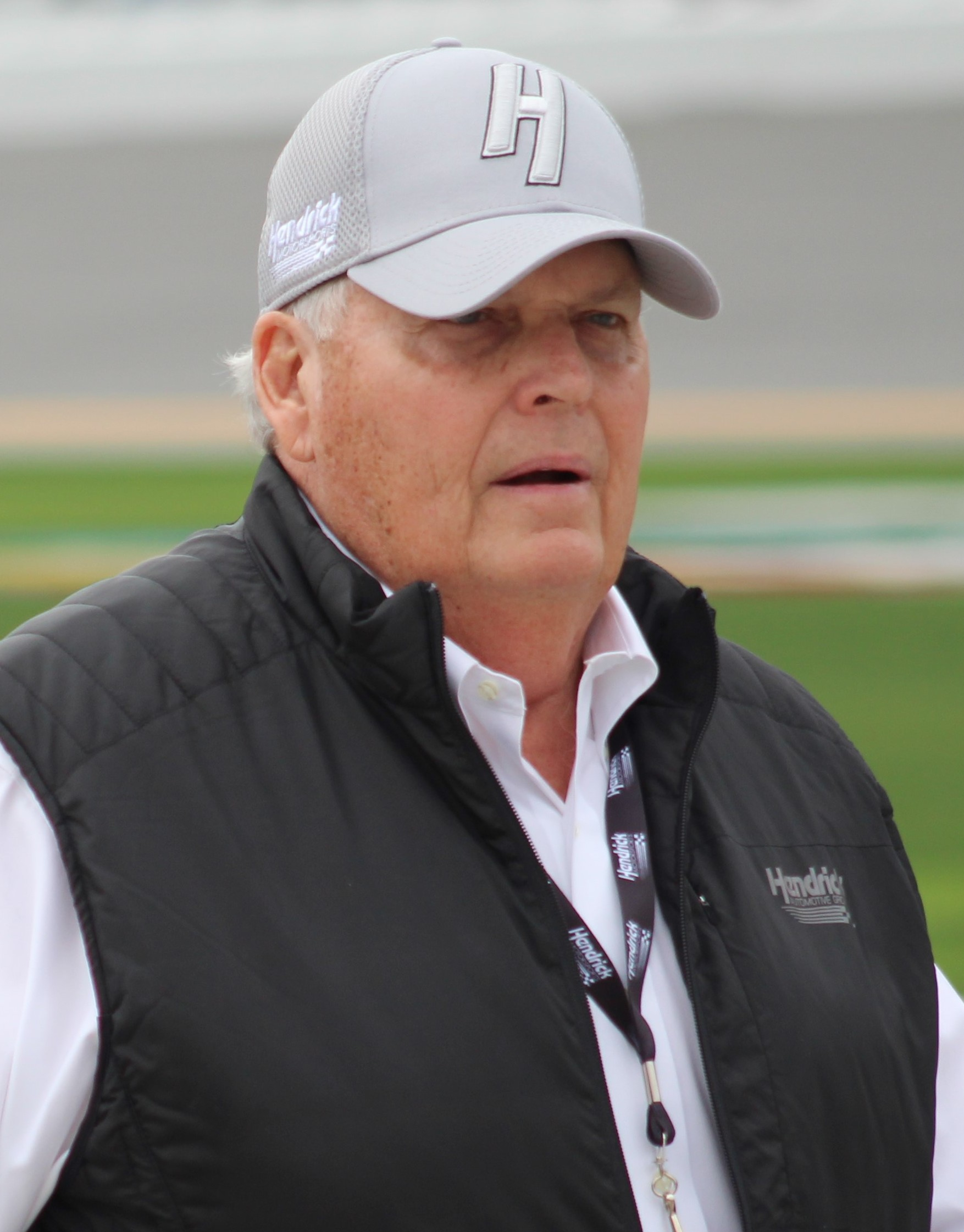
- Hendrick in 2019
- Born: Joseph Riddick Hendrick III; July 12, 1949 (age 77); Warrenton, North Carolina, U.S.
- Occupations: Owner, Hendrick Motorsports
- Years active: 1984–present
- Children: 2, including Ricky
- Achievements: As Car Owner: 1995—1998, 2001, 2006—2010, 2013, 2016, 2020—2021, 2025 NASCAR Cup Series Champion (15 outright, 12 in owners points); Records: Most NASCAR Cup Series championships for a car owner (15); Most NASCAR Cup Series wins for a car owner (324 as of 2026)
- Awards: NASCAR Hall of Fame (2017)

NASCAR Cup Series career
- 2 races run over 2 years
- Best finish: 63rd (1988)
- First race: 1987 Winston Western 500 (Riverside)
- Last race: 1988 Budweiser 400 (Riverside)
Wins	Top tens	Poles
0	0	0

NASCAR O'Reilly Auto Parts Series career
- 1 race run over 1 year
- Best finish: 64th (1987)
- First race: 1987 Amoco 300 (Road Atlanta)
Wins	Top tens	Poles
0	0	0

NASCAR FedEx Freight Truck Series career
- 1 race run over 1 year
- Best finish: 88th (1995)
- First race: 1995 Heartland Tailgate 175 (Topeka)
Wins	Top tens	Poles
0	0	0

Joseph Riddick "Rick" Hendrick III (born July 12, 1949) is an American businessman. He is best known as the owner of the NASCAR team Hendrick Motorsports. He is also a co-owner of JR Motorsports and founder of the Hendrick Automotive Group, the largest privately held dealership group in the United States.

As of 2024, his team has won 304 NASCAR Cup Series races, making him the winningest team owner in NASCAR. His team has also won a combined total of twenty NASCAR Championships: sixteen in the NASCAR Cup Series (seven by Jimmie Johnson, four by Jeff Gordon, three by Kyle Larson and one each by Chase Elliott, Terry Labonte), three in the NASCAR Truck Series (all by Jack Sprague) and one in the NASCAR Xfinity Series (by Brian Vickers in 2003). He is one of only three owners in history to win NASCAR Championships in the top three series, joining Richard Childress and Jack Roush. Hendrick was inducted into the NASCAR Hall of Fame in 2017 and the Motorsports Hall of Fame of America in 2020.

== Career ==
Hendrick began drag racing at the age of fourteen in a self-built 1931 Chevrolet. Two years later, at the age of 16, Hendrick won the Virginia division of the Chrysler-Plymouth Troubleshooting Contest, a two-part test consisting of a written exam and a timed hands-on diagnosis and repair of defects planted on a car.

Afterward, Hendrick opened a small used-car lot with Mike Leith. Leith, an established new-car dealer, was convinced to name Hendrick the general sales manager of the company, at the age of 23. In 1976, he sold his assets to purchase a franchise in Bennettsville, South Carolina. After doing so, he became the youngest Chevrolet dealer in the United States. Hendrick's influence increased sales to make the once troubled location become the region's most profitable. The success of Bennettsville was a precursor to the Hendrick Automotive Group, which now has over 100 franchises and 10,000 employees across 13 states. Headquartered in Charlotte, North Carolina, his company had a revenue in excess of $3.5 billion in 2009, after selling 100,000 vehicles and servicing 1.5 million, and is the sixth-largest dealership in the United States. Hendrick is also the chairman of the company.

Hendrick drove in two races during the 1987 and 1988 Winston Cup Series, with finishes of 33rd and 15th, respectively. He also had a single start in the Busch Series, Craftsman Truck Series, Featherlite Southwest Tour, and ARCA Permatex SuperCar Series. He also had been a pit crew member for the Flying 11 that Ray Hendrick (no relation) drove in the 1960s. In 1997, Hendrick began the Hendrick Marrow Program, a non-profit works with the Be The Match Foundation to support the National Marrow Donor Program.

== Team owner ==
In the late 1970s, Hendrick founded a drag boat racing team that won three consecutive championships, as well as setting a world record of 222.2 mph (357.6 km/h) with Nitro Fever. He then moved to the NASCAR Model Sportsman Series (now O'Reilly Auto Parts Series), in which he earned one victory with Dale Earnhardt at Charlotte Motor Speedway. In 1984, he founded All-Star Racing (now Hendrick Motorsports). With five full-time employees and 5,000 square feet (460 m^{2}) of workspace, he fielded one NASCAR Winston Cup team. With Geoff Bodine the driver, his team managed to race in all 30 races to finish ninth in the final standings with three wins and pole positions. Throughout his career as a team owner, Hendrick has won eighteen Drivers' championships (fourteen Cup Series, one Xfinity Series, and three Camping World Truck Series), 347 race wins (252 in the Cup Series, 67 in the O'Reilly Series 23 with Hendrick Motorsports and 44 with JR Motorsports, and 26 in the Truck Series), and 291 pole positions (216 Sprint Cup Series, 53 O'Reilly Series, 36 with Hendrick Motorsports, and seventeen with JR Motorsports, and 22 in the Truck Series). He is widely considered to be the most successful team owner in NASCAR history. On December 13, 2018, Hendrick announced that when he retires as owner of Hendrick Motorsports, there are plans in the works for Jeff Gordon to replace him.

During the late 1980s, Hendrick owned the Goodwrench IMSA GTP Corvette driven by Sarel Van der Merwe and Doc Bundy. The car was actually built by Lola but resembled later Corvette models and was powered by GM's twin-turbo V-6 engine. The GTP team was based in a tiny shop on Gasoline Alley (formerly Roena Street) in Indianapolis, Indiana and managed by Ken Howes of South Africa. The team experienced mixed successes, setting track records and winning many pole positions but few races. The project was abandoned after only a few seasons.

== Early and personal life ==
Hendrick was born in Warrenton, North Carolina and was raised on his family's farm in South Hill, Virginia, where he attended Park View High School.Hendrick rebuilt a 1931 Chevrolet at age 14 with the help of his father, Papa Joe Hendrick, whose full name was Joseph Riddick Hendrick Jr., and regularly traveled with him to racetracks across the region as a young man.

He is the father of the late Ricky Hendrick, a former NASCAR driver, who died in a plane crash in 2004 along with other members of the Hendrick family and Hendrick Motorsports crew members.

On October 31, 2011, Hendrick and his wife, Linda, were involved in a plane crash in Key West, Florida, when the plane landed long at Key West International Airport. Linda suffered minor injuries while Rick suffered three broken ribs and a fractured clavicle.

=== Legal issues ===
In 1997, Hendrick pleaded guilty to mail fraud. In the 1980s, Honda automobiles were in high demand and Honda executives allegedly solicited bribes from dealers for larger product disbursements. Hendrick admitted to giving hundreds of thousands of dollars, BMW automobiles, and houses to American Honda Motor Company executives. Hendrick was sentenced in December 1997 to a $250,000 fine, 12 months' home confinement (instead of prison, due to his leukemia), three years probation, and to have no involvement with Hendrick Automotive Group (which was run by Jim Perkins) or Hendrick Motorsports (run by his brother John) during his year of confinement. In December 2000, Hendrick received a full pardon from President Bill Clinton.

== Motorsports career results ==
=== NASCAR ===
(key) (Bold – Pole position awarded by qualifying time. Italics – Pole position earned by points standings or practice time. * – Most laps led.)

==== Winston Cup Series ====
NASCAR Winston Cup Series results
Year	Team	No.	Make	1	2	3	4	5	6	7	8	9	10	11	12	13	14	15	16	17	18	19	20	21	22	23	24	25	26	27	28	29	NWCC	Pts	Ref
1987	Hendrick Motorsports	25	Chevy	DAY	CAR	RCH	ATL	DAR	NWS	BRI	MAR	TAL	CLT	DOV	POC	RSD	MCH	DAY	POC	TAL	GLN	MCH	BRI	DAR	RCH	DOV	MAR	NWS	CLT	CAR	RSD; 33	ATL	106th	64	
1988	Hendrick Motorsports	18	Chevy	DAY	RCH	CAR	ATL	DAR	BRI	NWS	MAR	TAL	CLT	DOV	RSD; 15	POC	MCH	DAY	POC	TAL	GLN	MCH	BRI	DAR	RCH	DOV	MAR	CLT	NWS	CAR	PHO	ATL	63rd	118	

==== Busch Series ====
NASCAR Busch Series results
Year	Team	No.	Make	1	2	3	4	5	6	7	8	9	10	11	12	13	14	15	16	17	18	19	20	21	22	23	24	25	26	27	NBSC	Pts	Ref
1987	Hendrick Motorsports	15	Chevy	DAY	HCY	MAR	DAR	BRI	LGY	SBO	CLT	DOV	IRP	ROU	JFC	OXF	SBO	HCY	RAL; 24	LGY	ROU	BRI	JFC	DAR	RCH	DOV	MAR	CLT	CAR	MAR	64th	91	

==== SuperTruck Series ====
NASCAR SuperTruck Series results
Year	Team	No.	Make	1	2	3	4	5	6	7	8	9	10	11	12	13	14	15	16	17	18	19	20	NCTC	Pts	Ref
1995	Hendrick Motorsports	25	Chevy	PHO	TUS	SGS	MMR	POR	EVG	I70	LVL	BRI	MLW	CNS	HPT; 23	IRP	FLM	RCH	MAR	NWS	SON	MMR	PHO	88th	94	

=== ARCA SuperCar Series ===
(key) (Bold – Pole position awarded by qualifying time. Italics – Pole position earned by points standings or practice time. * – Most laps led.)

ARCA Permatex SuperCar Series results
Year	Team	No.	Make	1	2	3	4	5	6	7	8	9	10	11	12	13	14	15	16	17	18	19	20	ARSC	Pts	Ref
1991	Hendrick Motorsports	15	Chevy	DAY	ATL	KIL	TAL	TOL	FRS	POC	MCH	KIL	FRS	DEL	POC	TAL	HPT; 23	MCH	ISF	TOL	DSF	TWS	ATL	123rd	0	

== See also ==
- Hendrick Motorsports
- List of people pardoned by Bill Clinton
