= Hendrick Motorsports =

American racecar team

- Owner(s): Rick Hendrick; Jeff Gordon (Vice Chairman)
- Principal(s): Jeff Andrews (President); Chad Knaus (VP, Competition)
- Base: Charlotte, North Carolina
- Series: NASCAR Cup Series; NASCAR O'Reilly Auto Parts Series
- Race drivers: Cup Series: 5. Kyle Larson; 9. Chase Elliott; 24. William Byron; 48. Alex Bowman; O'Reilly Auto Parts Series: 17. Corey Day
- Manufacturer: Chevrolet
- Opened: 1984
- Website: hendrickmotorsports.com

Career
- Debut: Cup Series: 1984 Daytona 500 (Daytona); O'Reilly Auto Parts Series: 1984 Goody's 300 (Daytona); Truck Series: 1995 Skoal Bandit Copper World Classic (Phoenix); ARCA Racing Series: 1985 Kroger 200 (IRP); IndyCar Series: 2024 Indianapolis 500 (Indianapolis)
- Latest race: Cup Series: 2026 Season Finale 400 (Homestead) O'Reilly Auto Parts Series: 2026 O'Reilly Auto Parts 300 (Homestead) Truck Series: 2013 Lucas Oil 150 (Phoenix); ARCA Racing Series: 2014 Lucas Oil 200 (Daytona); IndyCar Series: 2025 Indianapolis 500 (Indianapolis)
- Races competed: Total: 2,031; Cup Series: 1,453; O'Reilly Auto Parts Series: 344; Truck Series: 180; ARCA Racing Series: 54; IndyCar Series: 2
- Drivers' Championships: Total: 20; Cup Series: 16; 1995, 1996, 1997, 1998, 2001, 2006, 2007, 2008, 2009, 2010, 2013, 2016, 2020, 2021, 2025, 2026; O'Reilly Auto Parts Series: 1; 2003; Truck Series: 3; 1997, 1999, 2001; ARCA Racing Series: 0 IndyCar Series: 0
- Race victories: Total: 393; Cup Series: 326; O'Reilly Auto Parts Series: 34; Truck Series: 26; ARCA Racing Series: 7 IndyCar Series: 0
- Pole positions: Total: 335; Cup Series: 259; O'Reilly Auto Parts Series: 46; Truck Series: 22; ARCA Racing Series: 8 IndyCar Series: 0

Hendrick Motorsports is an American professional auto racing organization that competes in the NASCAR Cup Series and the NASCAR O'Reilly Auto Parts Series. The team was founded in 1984 as All-Star Racing by Rick Hendrick. Hendrick Motorsports has won a NASCAR-record 326 Cup Series races and 16 Cup Series owners and drivers championships to go with three Truck Series owners and drivers titles and one O'Reilly Auto Parts Series drivers crown. Additionally, the team has 34 O'Reilly Auto Parts Series race wins, 26 Truck Series race wins, and seven ARCA Menards Series race wins.

Hendrick Motorsports fields four full-time Cup Series teams with the Chevrolet Camaro ZL1; the No. 5 for Kyle Larson, the No. 9 for Chase Elliott, the No. 24 for William Byron, and the No. 48 for Alex Bowman. The team also fields the No. 17 Chevrolet Camaro SS team full-time for Corey Day in the NASCAR O'Reilly Auto Parts Series. Hendrick Motorsports also fielded several trucks in the NASCAR Craftsman Truck Series, most recently for Elliott in 2013. The team has fielded cars in the past for many NASCAR drivers, including Hall of Famers Jeff Gordon, Mark Martin, Terry Labonte, Darrell Waltrip, Benny Parsons, Dale Earnhardt Jr., and seven-time Cup champion Jimmie Johnson, and others such as Geoff Bodine, Tim Richmond, Ricky Rudd, Ken Schrader, Ricky Craven, Jerry Nadeau, Joe Nemechek, Kyle Busch, Casey Mears, and Kasey Kahne. Hendrick Motorsports maintains an in-house engine shop, with the team leasing some of its engines to technical partners such as Haas Factory Team, Hyak Motorsports and Spire Motorsports.

== History ==
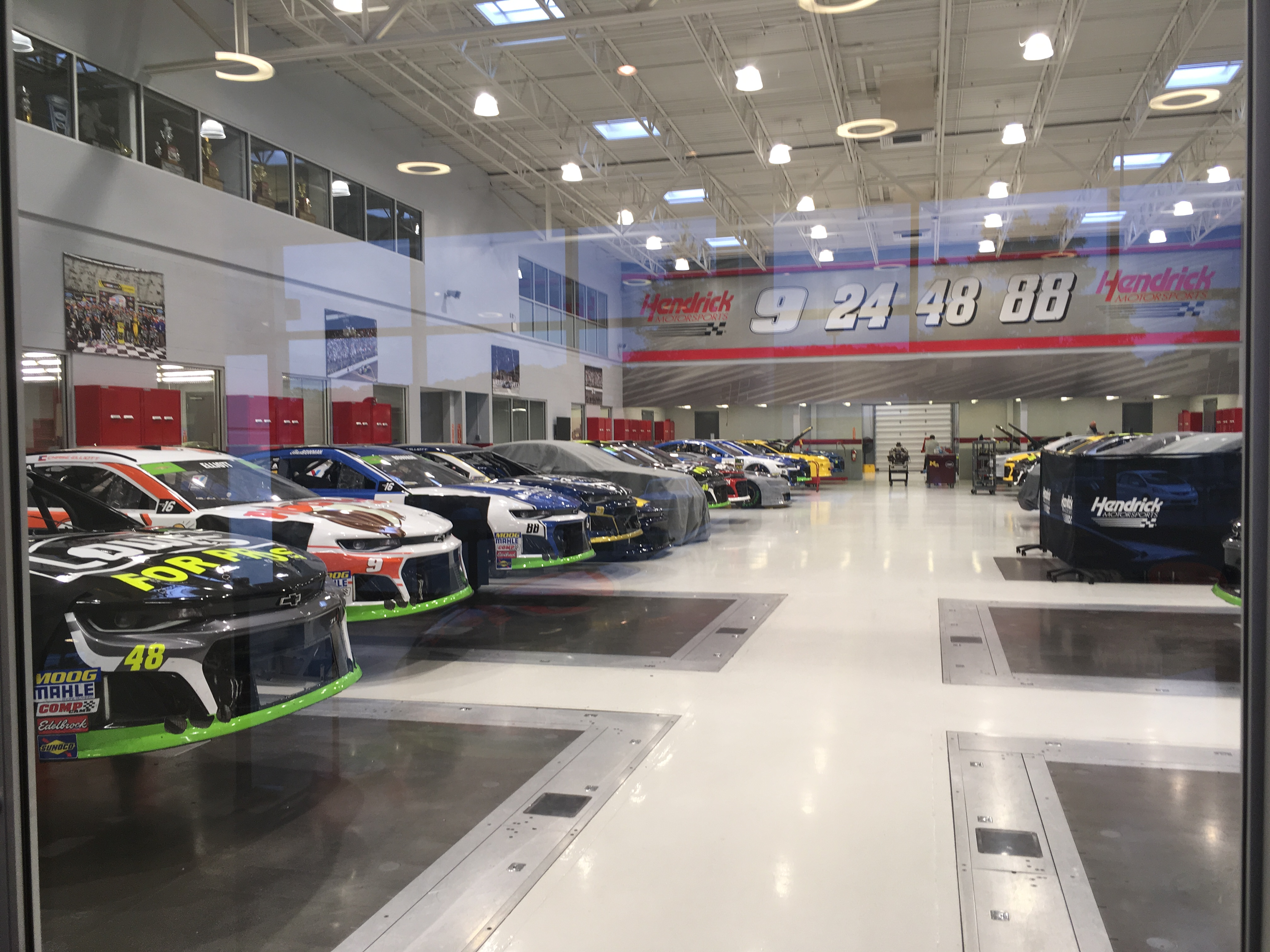
Hendrick Motorsports race shop in Concord, North Carolina

What is now Hendrick Motorsports was founded prior to the 1984 season by Rick Hendrick, a Charlotte, North Carolina–based car dealership owner who currently operates a network of dealerships called Hendrick Automotive Group. The team was formed with crew chief and car builder Harry Hyde as All-Star Racing. The team, renamed Hendrick Motorsports in 1985, was involved with the GM Goodwrench IMSA GTP Corvette and twin-turbo V6 engine development effort and competed in the IMSA GTP series from 1985 through 1988 with drivers Doc Bundy and Sarel van der Merwe. Hendrick Motorsports and GM ceased the project in 1988.

Hendrick Motorsports expanded its NASCAR efforts to two full-time cars in 1986, three in 1987, and four in 2002. It was one of the first teams in NASCAR to be successful operating multiple entries, partly based on the model used at the Hendrick car dealerships. The team has also been credited for innovations in engine construction and pit crew training. In 2020, Hendrick Motorsports partnered with AdvoCare in its performance and fitness teams.

Hendrick Motorsports (as All-Star Racing) won its first race in 1984 at Martinsville with the No. 5 driven by Geoff Bodine. At the 2021 Coca-Cola 600, Hendrick Motorsports became the winningest team in NASCAR Cup Series history when it won its 269th race with the No. 5 driven by Kyle Larson. This eclipsed the record held by Petty Enterprises at 268 wins, which had held the record of the winningest team in the series since 1960.

In 2023, Hendrick worked with NASCAR, Chevrolet, and Goodyear Tires to enter the 24 Hours of Le Mans with a modified version of the current NASCAR Cup car, in conjunction with the 75th anniversary of NASCAR.

== NASCAR O'Reilly Auto Parts Series ==
Hendrick Motorsports fielded in-house entries in the Busch Series from 1984 to 1990, and again from 2000 to 2007, primarily the No. 5 entry. Following the conclusion of the 2007 racing season, Hendrick Motorsports and JR Motorsports (owned by then-Hendrick Motorsports driver Dale Earnhardt Jr.) officially combined Xfinity Series operations. The No. 5 Chevrolets began running full-time under the JR Motorsports banner in 2008, and the team received engines and technical support from Hendrick Motorsports, with several of its employees moving to JR Motorsports. Rick Hendrick is an equity partner in JRM and continues to be listed as car owner of the No. 5 team.

=== Car No. 0 history ===
Part-time with Tim Richmond (1984)

In 1984, the team fielded the No. 0 car for Tim Richmond at Charlotte. He started from the pole position and finished 5th.

==== Car No. 0 results ====
Year	Driver	No.	Make	1	2	3	4	5	6	7	8	9	10	11	12	13	14	15	16	17	18	19	20	21	22	23	24	25	26	27	28	29	Owners	Pts
1984	Tim Richmond	0	Pontiac	DAY	RCH	CAR	HCY	MAR	DAR	ROU	NSV	LGY	MLW	DOV	CLT	SBO	HCY	ROU	SBO	ROU	HCY	IRP	LGY	SBO	BRI	DAR	RCH	NWS	CLT; 5	HCY	CAR	MAR		

=== Car No. 5 history ===
Part-time (1985–1986)

The No. 5 car debuted in 1985 with Brett Bodine ran twelve races. The younger Bodine brother would win three races for the team. Geoff Bodine ran four races in the No. 5 car. Bodine won the season opener Goody's 300.

In 1986, Geoff Bodine drove the No. 5 for one race at Bristol. He won the pole and finished sixteenth.

Ricky Hendrick (2002)

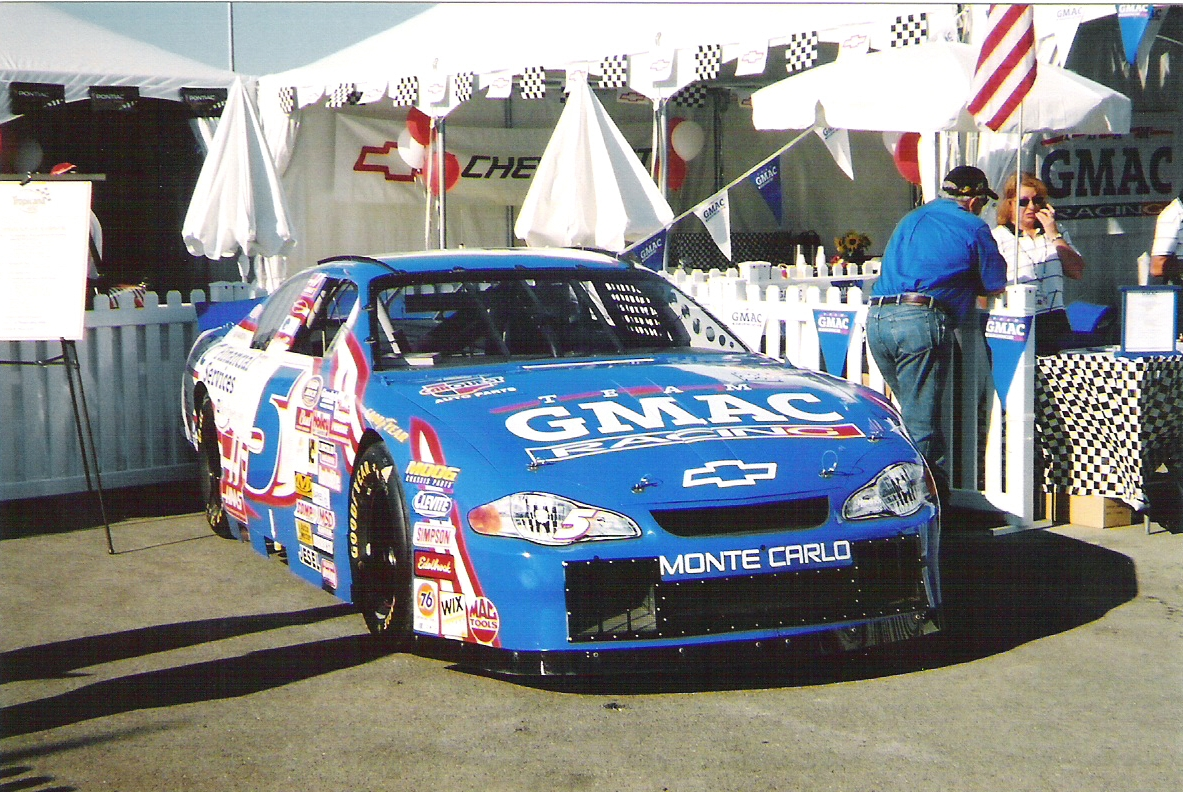
Ricky Hendrick's No. 5 GMAC Chevrolet in 2002

The current No. 5 car debuted as the No. 14 of JG Motorsports in 2000, with Rick Hendrick's son Ricky Hendrick finishing 39th in the season finale at Homestead.

The number was switched to No. 5 when the car began competing full-time in 2002. After Ricky Hendrick was injured in a wreck at Las Vegas, Ron Hornaday Jr. took over for the next six races before Hendrick returned at Richmond. Toward the end of the season, Hendrick suddenly announced his retirement from driving due to lingering effects from the crash, but he remained as car owner until his death in 2004. David Green finished out the season for the team.

Brian Vickers (2003)

Ricky Hendrick selected 19-year-old Brian Vickers to drive the No. 5 car in 2003. Vickers won three races and the Busch Series championship, finishing just 14 points ahead of Hendrick test driver and former No. 5 team spotter David Green.

Kyle Busch (2004)

When Vickers moved up to the Cup Series, Kyle Busch became the No. 5 car's driver after he had run seven races the previous season. In his rookie year, Busch won five races and was runner-up to Martin Truex Jr. in points. He moved up to the Cup Series after the season, but he continued to drive the No. 5 Busch Series car part-time for several more years.

Multiple Drivers (2005–2006)

Adrián Fernández drove the car for six races in 2005, finishing tenth at Autódromo, his only top-ten finish of the season. Hendrick development drivers Blake Feese, Boston Reid, and Kyle Krisiloff also periodically drove the No. 5 car, running a combined fifteen races. Busch, Vickers, and Jimmie Johnson ran the rest of the schedule, with Busch winning at Lowe's while also scoring one top five and two top tens and scoring a pole at Bristol while Johnson scored only one top five and a pole at Darlington while Vickers in his only start at Watkins Glen finished in third. Fernández had only one top-ten with his tenth place finish in Mexico City along with an average finish of 31.8 and had 3 DNF's. As for Feese, Reid, and Krisiloff, the three drivers driving the 5 car combined for zero top tens with the best finish being a seventeenth by Reid at Nashville along with a combined average finish of 30.5 and had a combined seven DNF's. The season was so bad, all three drivers were released and Rick Hendrick shut down his driver development program until 2008 when he merged with Dale Earnhardt Jr's team JR Motorsports. Feese continued to race sporadically in ARCA and the Truck Series before not racing again after 2011. Reid ran 21 races from 2006 to 2007 in the Truck Series. Kyle Krisiloff ran part-time in the Truck Series in 2006 for Billy Ballew Motorsports before returning to the Busch Series doing a full-time season in 2007 for Carl A. Haas Motorsports and then running 6 races for Chip Ganassi Racing in 2008 before retiring at 22 years old. All three never made a start in the Cup Series.

In 2006, Busch drove 34 of 35 races, winning at Bristol and finishing seventh in points. Justin Labonte drove for one race at Memphis.

Part Time (2007)

In 2007, Busch ran the No. 5 on a part-time basis, sharing the ride with Mark Martin, Landon Cassill, Casey Mears, and Adrián Fernández, running a total of 26 races. The car carried a number of different sponsors including Lowe's, Delphi, Spectrum, and Hendrick Autoguard. Busch drove the car to victory lane four times in 2007, while Martin finished second twice in three races.

JR Motorsports (2008–2018)

The No. 5 team moved to JR Motorsports in 2008, and featured eight drivers, including Johnson and Earnhardt Jr., and four primary sponsors in its first year. In 2009, the No. 5 car ran a part-time schedule due to sponsorship limitations. Fastenal, Unilever and GoDaddy.com sponsored seven different drivers over the course of the season. A variety of drivers ran the car in subsequent NASCAR Xfinity Series seasons until it was shut down for the 2019 season.

==== Car No. 5 results ====
Year	Driver	No.	Make	1	2	3	4	5	6	7	8	9	10	11	12	13	14	15	16	17	18	19	20	21	22	23	24	25	26	27	28	29	30	31	32	33	34	35	Owners	Pts
1985	Geoff Bodine	5	Pontiac	DAY; 1*	CAR; 3	HCY	BRI; 16*		DAR; 32																															
1985	Brett Bodine	5	Pontiac					MAR; 1		SBO; 4	LGY	DOV	CLT; 4	SBO; 3	HCY; 2	ROU	IRP; 25*	SBO	LGY	HCY; 9	MLW	BRI; 1*	DAR; 8	RCH	NWS	ROU	CLT; 9	HCY	CAR; 1*	MAR; 27										
1986	Geoff Bodine	5	Pontiac	DAY	CAR	HCY	MAR	BRI; 16	DAR	SBO	LGY	JFC	DOV	CLT	SBO	HCY	ROU	IRP	SBO	RAL	OXF	SBO	HCY	LGY	ROU	BRI	DAR	RCH	DOV	MAR	ROU	CLT	CAR	MAR						
2002	Ricky Hendrick	5	Chevy	DAY; 27	CAR; 21	LVS; 37							RCH; 15	NHA; 15	NZH; 30	CLT; 22	DOV; 25	NSH; 15	KEN; 8	MLW; 15	DAY; 20	CHI; 21	GTY; 24	PPR; 22	IRP; 7	MCH; 23	BRI; 29	DAR; 33	RCH; 17	DOV; 27	KAN; 38								20th	3475
2002	Ron Hornaday Jr.	5	Chevy				DAR; 15	BRI; 38	TEX; 12	NSH; 22	TAL; 29	CAL; 17																											20th	3475
2002	David Green	5	Chevy																													CLT; 5	MEM; 9	ATL; 14	CAR; 4	PHO; 5	HOM; 42		20th	3475
2003	Brian Vickers	5	Chevy	DAY; 42	CAR; 8	LVS; 13	DAR; 7	BRI; 14	TEX; 25*	TAL; 23	NSH; 9	CAL; 19	RCH; 16	GTY; 4	NZH; 2	CLT; 14	DOV; 5	NSH; 10	KEN; 6	MLW; 2	DAY; 7	CHI; 3	NHA; 4	PPR; 29	IRP; 1	MCH; 19	BRI; 7	DAR; 1	RCH; 4	DOV; 1*	KAN; 32	CLT; 4	MEM; 5*	ATL; 31	PHO; 3	CAR; 6	HOM; 11		2nd	4637
2004	Kyle Busch	5	Chevy	DAY; 24	CAR; 7	LVS; 15	DAR; 17	BRI; 3	TEX; 2*	NSH; 6	TAL; 4	CAL; 7	GTY; 5	RCH; 1*	NZH; 10	CLT; 1*	DOV; 5	NSH; 17	KEN; 1	MLW; 16	DAY; 11	CHI; 12*	NHA; 25	PPR; 17	IRP; 1	MCH; 1*	BRI; 3	CAL; 9	RCH; 5	DOV; 9	KAN; 29	CLT; 5	MEM; 14	ATL; 2	PHO; 2*	DAR; 33	HOM; 3		2nd	4943
2005	Kyle Busch	5	Chevy	DAY; 32			LVS; 11						TAL; 40			CLT; 1*					DAY; 27	CHI; 36							BRI; 38		RCH; 14	DOV; 37	KAN; 8						26th	2955
2005	Boston Reid	5	Chevy		CAL; 22				NSH; 30			PHO; 39						NSH; 17					NHA; 36		GTY; 25														26th	2955
2005	Adrián Fernández	5	Chevy			MXC; 10																								CAL; 28				CLT; 40		TEX; 43	PHO; 28	HOM; 42	26th	2955
2005	Blake Feese	5	Chevy					ATL; 23		BRI; 28	TEX; 37								KEN; 34					PPR; 37		IRP; 29													26th	2955
2005	Jimmie Johnson	5	Chevy											DAR; 23	RCH; 25		DOV; 5																						26th	2955
2005	Kyle Krisiloff	5	Chevy																	MLW; 42								MCH; 40							MEM; 19				26th	2955
2005	Brian Vickers	5	Chevy																								GLN; 3												26th	2955
2006	Kyle Busch	5	Chevy	DAY; 25	CAL; 23	MXC; 7	LVS; 19	ATL; 40	BRI; 1	TEX; 4	NSH; 30	PHO; 12	TAL; 3	RCH; 9	DAR; 6	CLT; 23	DOV; 6	NSH; 31	KEN; 13*	MLW; 24	DAY; 16	CHI; 42	NHA; 16	MAR; 20	GTY; 8	IRP; 21	GLN; 37	MCH; 14	BRI; 7	CAL; 11	RCH; 12	DOV; 7	KAN; 3	CLT; 12		TEX; 32	PHO; 10	HOM; 41	7th	4018
2006	Justin Labonte	5	Chevy																																MEM; 22				7th	4018
2007	Kyle Busch	5	Chevy	DAY; 37*	CAL; 3		LVS; 2*	ATL; 3*	BRI; 3	NSH	TEX; 7*	PHO; 37	TAL; 39	RCH; 5		CLT; 8	DOV	NSH	KEN	MLW	NHA	DAY; 1*	CHI; 5*	GTY	IRP	CGV			BRI; 4	CAL; 2	RCH; 1*		KAN; 1	CLT; 2		TEX; 2	PHO; 1*		9th	3896
2007	Adrián Fernández	5	Chevy			MXC; 9																																	9th	3896
2007	Mark Martin	5	Chevy												DAR; 2													MCH; 14										HOM; 2	9th	3896
2007	Casey Mears	5	Chevy																								GLN; 8												9th	3896
2007	Landon Cassill	5	Chevy																													DOV; 18			MEM; 20				9th	3896

=== Car No. 15 history ===
Part-time (1984–1990)

Hendrick Motorsports began competing in the 1984 debut season of the Busch Series, fielding the No. 15 car for seventeen races with sponsorship coming from Levi Garrett, with Cup Series driver Geoff Bodine running 12 of them. Bodine would score Hendrick Motorsports' first win in the Busch Series at Rockingham Speedway. Ron Bouchard, Dick Trickle, Glenn Jarrett all ran one race, while Tim Richmond ran one. In 1985, Brett Bodine ran one race in the No. 15 car. Geoff Bodine also ran one race in the No. 15. Tim Richmond ran two races in the No. 15, winning once at Charlotte. In 1986, the team ran seven races, three with Bodine and Richmond, and one with Rob Moroso. Richmond would get the team's only win of the year at Charlotte. In 1987, the team ran nine races utilizing the No. 15. Eight of them were driven by Geoff Bodine, and one with team owner Rick Hendrick. While Hendrick would DNF in his start, Bodine would once again win the season opener at Daytona. The team ran eight races as the No. 15 in 1988 with Geoff Bodine being the only driver. Bodine would win once at Darlington Raceway. In 1989, the team would only run five races, with Geoff Bodine and Ken Schrader driving. While Schrader would DNF his two starts, Bodine would once again get a single win at Darlington. In 1990, Greg Sacks drove the No. 15 once at Charlotte, He finished second. After the 1990 season, Hendrick Motorsports shut down its Busch Series operation for the time being.

==== Car No. 15 results ====
Year	Driver	No.	Make	1	2	3	4	5	6	7	8	9	10	11	12	13	14	15	16	17	18	19	20	21	22	23	24	25	26	27	28	29	30	31	Owners	Pts
1984	Geoff Bodine	15	Pontiac	DAY; 3	RCH	CAR; 24	HCY	MAR											SBO; 5	ROU	HCY	IRP; 4	LGY	SBO; 4	BRI; 28	DAR; 33	RCH; 2		CLT; 4	HCY	CAR; 1*	MAR; 8				
1984	Geoff Bodine	15	Chevy						DAR; 2	ROU	NSV	LGY																								
1984	Dick Trickle	15	Pontiac										MLW; 3																							
1984	Ron Bouchard	15	Pontiac											DOV; 2																						
1984	Tim Richmond	15	Pontiac												CLT; 29	SBO	HCY	ROU																		
1984	Glenn Jarrett	15	Pontiac																									NWS; 23								
1985	Brett Bodine	15	Pontiac	DAY	CAR	HCY	BRI; 12	MAR	DAR	SBO	LGY	DOV																								
1985	Tim Richmond	15	Pontiac										CLT; 1*	SBO	HCY	ROU	IRP	SBO	LGY	HCY	MLW	BRI	DAR; 23*	RCH	NWS	ROU										
1985	Geoff Bodine	15	Pontiac																								CLT; 2*	HCY	CAR	MAR						
1986	Geoff Bodine	15	Pontiac	DAY; 2	CAR	HCY	MAR	BRI																								CLT; 5				
1986	Tim Richmond	15	Pontiac						DAR; 27	SBO	LGY	JFC	DOV	CLT; 1*	SBO	HCY	ROU	IRP	SBO	RAL	OXF	SBO	HCY	LGY	ROU	BRI	DAR; 4	RCH	DOV	MAR	ROU					
1986	Rob Moroso	15	Olds																														CAR; 18	MAR		
1987	Geoff Bodine	15	Chevy	DAY; 1	HCY	MAR	DAR; 2	BRI	LGY	SBO	CLT; 13	DOV	IRP	ROU	JFC	OXF	SBO	HCY				BRI; 16*	JFC	DAR	RCH; 3	DOV	MAR	CLT; 39	CAR; 2	MAR; 19						
1987	Rick Hendrick	15	Chevy																RAL; 24	LGY	ROU															
1988	Geoff Bodine	15	Chevy	DAY; 2	HCY	CAR	MAR	DAR; 1	BRI	LNG	NZH	SBO	NSV	CLT; 29*	DOV	ROU	LAN	LVL	MYB	OXF	SBO	HCY	LNG	IRP	ROU	BRI	DAR; 2	RCH; 26	DOV	MAR	CLT; 2*	CAR; 6	MAR; 27			
1989	Geoff Bodine	15	Chevy	DAY; 5	CAR	MAR	HCY	DAR; 1*	BRI	NZH	SBO	LAN	NSV	CLT; 10*	DOV	ROU	LVL	VOL	MYB	SBO	HCY	DUB	IRP	ROU	BRI											
1989	Ken Schrader	15	Chevy																							DAR; 35	RCH	DOV	MAR	CLT; 32	CAR	MAR				
1990	Greg Sacks	15	Chevy	DAY	RCH	CAR	MAR	HCY	DAR	BRI	LAN	SBO	NZH	HCY	CLT	DOV	ROU	VOL	MYB	OXF	NHA	SBO	DUB	IRP	ROU	BRI	DAR	RCH	DOV	MAR	CLT; 2	NHA	CAR	MAR		

=== Car No. 17 history ===
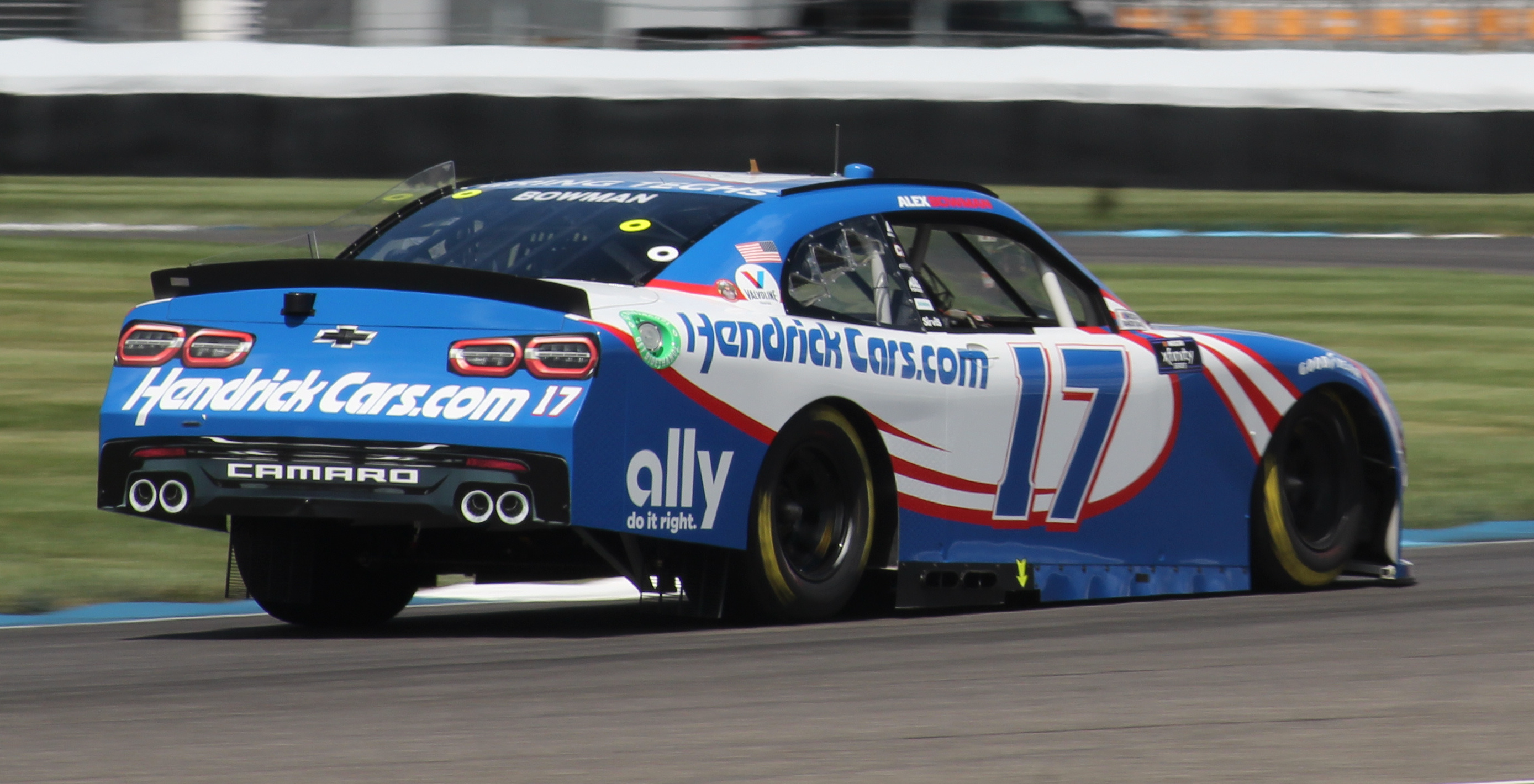
Alex Bowman in the No. 17 at Indianapolis Motor Speedway in 2022

Part-time (2022–2025)

On June 2, 2022, Hendrick Motorsports announced it would field the No. 17 in three Xfinity races in 2022, with Kyle Larson running at Road America, Alex Bowman at Indianapolis, and William Byron at Watkins Glen. This marked Hendrick Motorsports' return to the Xfinity Series after Tony Stewart won for the team at Daytona in 2009. Larson dominated at Road America, but eventually lost to Ty Gibbs on the final lap. Bowman ran the car at the Indianapolis road course, but it again finished second, this time to A. J. Allmendinger. At Watkins Glen, Byron fiercely battled Gibbs for the lead throughout most of the race until they both spun off-course during the final restart, resulting in Byron finishing 25th. At the September Darlington race, Larson finished fifth after engaging in a three-car battle with Noah Gragson and Sheldon Creed over the closing laps. Larson attempted a pass on Creed for the lead on the final lap, only for both to be passed by race-winner Gragson.

On March 8, 2023, Hendrick Motorsports announced that, for the second year in a row, it would field the No. 17 in four Xfinity races in 2023, with Byron running at Circuit of the Americas, Larson at Sonoma and Darlington, and Bowman at Watkins Glen. On July 12, Hendrick Motorsports added a fifth race to their Xfinity schedule, with Elliott driving the No. 17 at Pocono. On September 26, two further races were added to the No. 17 schedule, with Boris Said competing at the Charlotte Roval and Rajah Caruth competing in the season finale at Phoenix.

For 2024, a ten–race schedule was announced on February 27, 2024, with Cup Byron, Larson, Bowman and Chase Elliott all competing in at least one race, with Said also competing for the team at Sonoma. The organization claimed their first win in the Xfinity Series since 2009 with Larson at the Circuit of the Americas after overtaking a dueling Shane van Gisbergen and Austin Hill on the final lap. Elliott took the No. 17 to victory lane at Charlotte.

In 2025, the team announced a sixteen-race schedule, with newly signed development driver Corey Day serving as the anchor driver, competing in ten races for the team, while the remaining six races being split between Byron, Bowman, Larson and Elliott. Larson took the No. 17 car to victory lane at Bristol, while Byron won at Charlotte. The team added a second race for Elliott at Pocono. On July 14, the team announced Jake Finch would make his Xfinity Series debut at Dover. Larson made a third start for the team at Indianapolis.

Corey Day (2026–present)

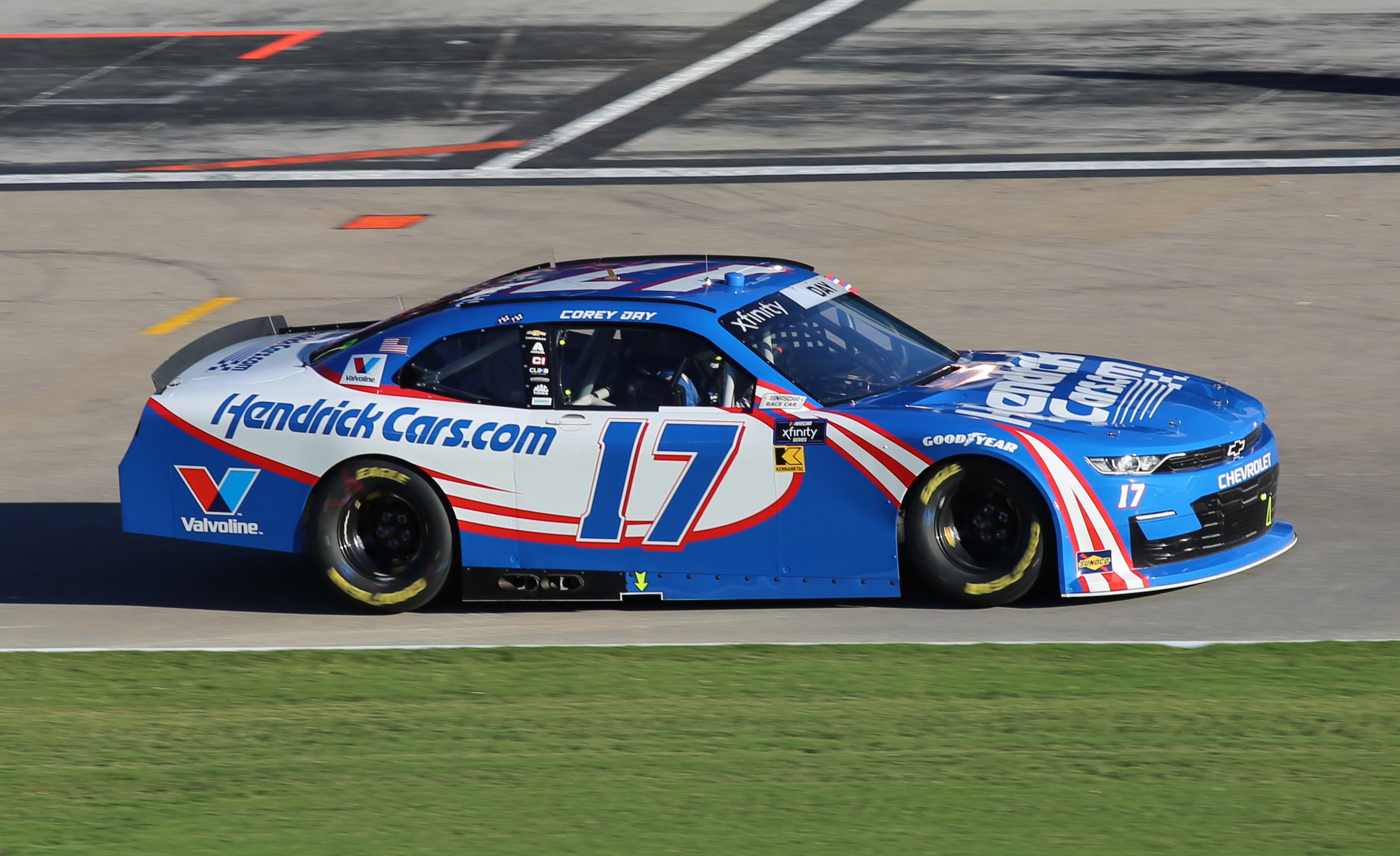
Corey Day in the No. 17 car at Las Vegas Motor Speedway in 2025

It was announced Corey Day would move to full time for the 2026 season. He started the season with a 27th place DNF at Daytona. After a streak of eight consecutive top ten finishes, he scored his first career win at Talladega. He also won at Dover. On August 18, 2026, it was announced that Day will return to HMS for the 2027 season. During "The Chase", Day won at Las Vegas from the pole position. A week later, he scored a win at fall Charlotte race.

==== Car No. 17 results ====
Year	Driver	No.	Make	1	2	3	4	5	6	7	8	9	10	11	12	13	14	15	16	17	18	19	20	21	22	23	24	25	26	27	28	29	30	31	32	33	Owners	Pts
2022	Kyle Larson	17	Chevy	DAY	CAL	LVS	PHO	ATL	COA	RCH	MAR	TAL	DOV	DAR	TEX	CLT	PIR	NSH	ROA; 2*	ATL	NHA	POC					DAR; 5	KAN	BRI	TEX	TAL	ROV	LVS	HOM	MAR	PHO	39th	156
2022	Alex Bowman	17	Chevy																				IRC; 2	MCH													39th	156
2022	William Byron	17	Chevy																						GLN; 25*	DAY											39th	156
2023	William Byron	17	Chevy	DAY	CAL	LVS	PHO	ATL	COA; 2	RCH	MAR	TAL	DOV	DAR	CLT	PIR																					38th	210
2023	Kyle Larson	17	Chevy														SON; 3*	NSH	CSC	ATL	NHA							DAR; 38	KAN	BRI	TEX						38th	210
2023	Chase Elliott	17	Chevy																			POC; 3	ROA	MCH	IRC												38th	210
2023	Alex Bowman	17	Chevy																							GLN; 9	DAY										38th	210
2023	Boris Said	17	Chevy																													ROV; DNQ	LVS	HOM	MAR		38th	210
2023	Rajah Caruth	17	Chevy																																	PHO; 14	38th	210
2024	William Byron	17	Chevy	DAY	ATL	LVS	PHO; 23							DAR; 11								POC; 3	IND	MCH	DAY			GLN; 12	BRI	KAN	TAL	ROV	LVS	HOM	MAR	PHO	35th	322
2024	Kyle Larson	17	Chevy					COA; 1	RCH	MAR	TEX	TAL	DOV								CSC; 3																35th	322
2024	Chase Elliott	17	Chevy												CLT; 1	PIR										DAR; 4	ATL										35th	322
2024	Boris Said	17	Chevy														SON; 28	IOW																			35th	322
2024	Alex Bowman	17	Chevy																NHA; 9	NSH																	35th	322
2025	William Byron	17	Chevy	DAY	ATL	COA; 2										CLT; 1																					19th	620
2025	Alex Bowman	17	Chevy				PHO; 2	LVS																													19th	620
2025	Kyle Larson	17	Chevy						HOM; 4*			BRI; 1*	CAR	TAL										IND; 4													19th	620
2025	Corey Day	17	Chevy							MAR; 21					TEX; 16		NSH; 11	MXC				SON; 24			IOW; 24	GLN	DAY	PIR	GTW; 9	BRI; 17		ROV; 22	LVS; 4	TAL	MAR; 13	PHO; 14	19th	620
2025	Chase Elliott	17	Chevy								DAR; 2								POC; 4*	ATL	CSC																19th	620
2025	Jake Finch	17	Chevy																				DOV; 17														19th	620
2025	Rajah Caruth	17	Chevy																												KAN; 18						19th	620
2026	Corey Day	17	Chevy	DAY; 27	ATL; 4	COA; 5	PHO; 9	LVS; 8	DAR; 6	MAR; 2	CAR; 10*	BRI; 8	KAN; 12	TAL; 1	TEX; 37	GLN; 15	DOV; 1	CLT; 5	NSH; 6	POC; 38	COR; 10	SON; 7	CHI; 19	ATL; 32	IND; 7	IOW; 36	DAY; 29	DAR; 2	GTW; 33	BRI; 5	LVS; 1*	CLT; 1	PHO; 4	TAL; 6	MAR; 3	HOM; 5	5th	2411

=== Car No. 24 History ===
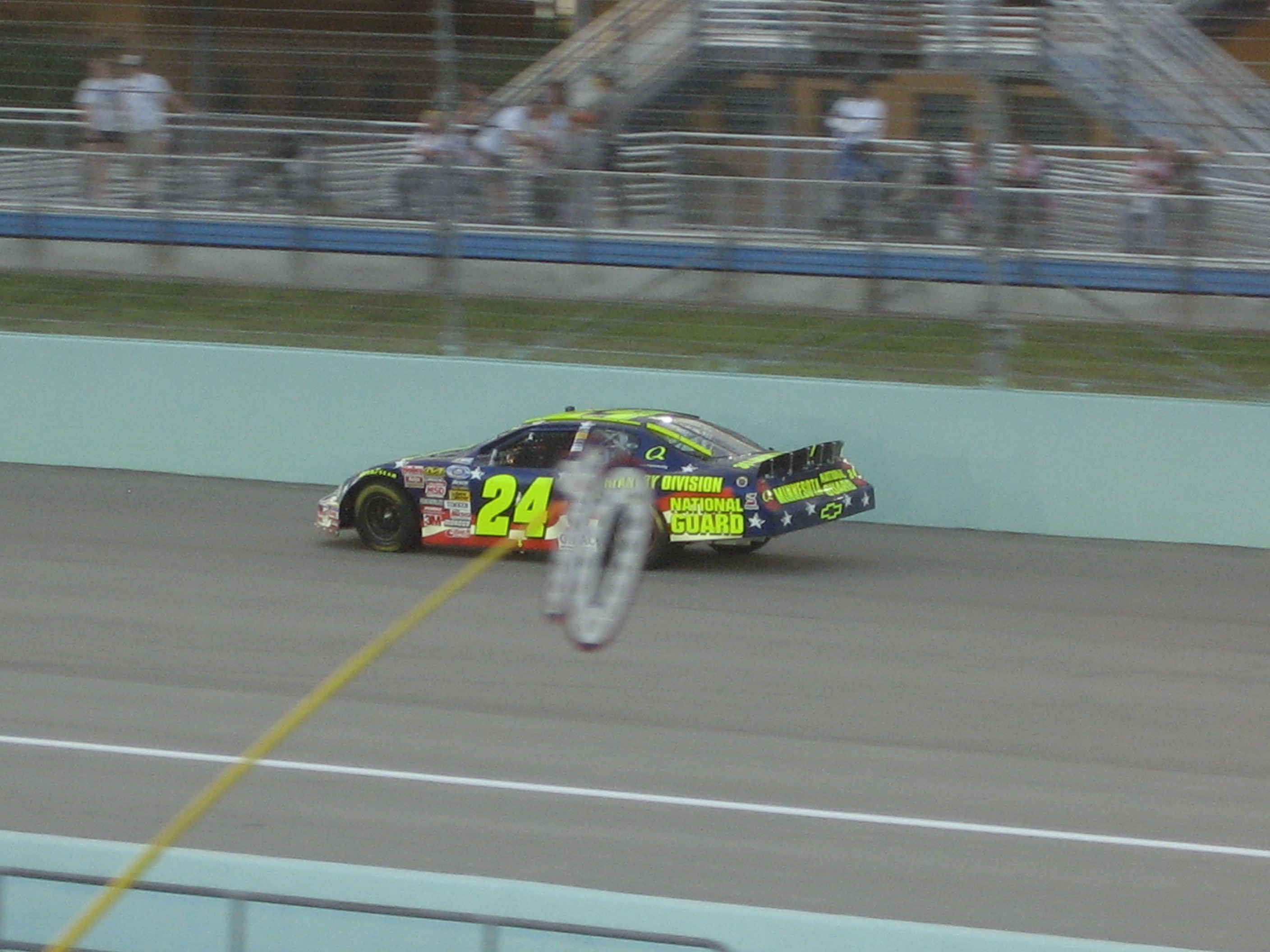
Casey Mears' No. 24 National Guard Chevrolet at Homestead in 2007

JG Motorsports (1999–2000)

The No. 24 team started in 1999 with Gordon-Evernham Motorsports, owned by Jeff Gordon and crew chief Ray Evernham. Gordon and Ricky Hendrick combined to compete in 10 races. In 2000, Rick Hendrick bought out Evernham's share, renaming the team JG Motorsports. Gordon and Ricky Hendrick once again shared the ride, with Hendrick running 15 events. The team also formed an alliance with Cicci-Welliver Racing.

Part Time (2001)

Hendrick Motorsports took full control of the team in 2001, with GMAC Financial Services sponsoring the No. 24 team in each of its three races. Ricky Hendrick drove in those three races. In 2002, Hendrick moved to the No. 5 Busch Series car and three-time truck series champion Jack Sprague took over the No. 24 full-time.

Jack Sprague (2002)

Sprague ran the full 2002 season, bringing truck series sponsor NetZero with him. He earned three poles and a win at Nashville en route to a fifth place points finish. Sprague moved to Hendrick-affiliated Haas CNC Racing in 2003.

Part Time (2007)

In 2007, the No. 24 returned with Casey Mears and Landon Cassill as the drivers, with the National Guard providing sponsorship. After the 2007 season, the team shut down.

==== Car No. 24 results ====
Year	Driver	No.	Make	1	2	3	4	5	6	7	8	9	10	11	12	13	14	15	16	17	18	19	20	21	22	23	24	25	26	27	28	29	30	31	32	33	34	35	Owners	Pts
1999	Jeff Gordon	24	Chevy	DAY	CAR	LVS; 4	ATL	DAR	TEX; 13	NSV	BRI	TAL	CAL	NHA	RCH	NZH	CLT; 33	DOV	SBO	GLN	MLW					MCH; 2	BRI	DAR			CLT; 2			PHO; 1	HOM				52nd	878
1999	Ricky Hendrick	24	Chevy																			MYB; 20	PPR	GTY	IRP				RCH; DNQ	DOV		CAR; 37	MEM; DNQ						52nd	878
2000	Ricky Hendrick	24	Chevy	DAY	CAR; DNQ			DAR; DNQ	BRI		NSV; 5	TAL	CAL	RCH; 28	NHA; DNQ			SBO; 42	MYB; 13	GLN	MLW; DNQ	NZH	PPR; 26	GTY; 38	IRP; 36		BRI; DNQ	DAR; 29	RCH	DOV	CLT; 13	CAR; 39	MEM	PHO					40th	1580
2000	Jeff Gordon	24	Chevy			LVS; 18	ATL			TEX; 42						CLT; 4	DOV									MCH; 7									HOM; 1				40th	1580
2001	Ricky Hendrick	24	Chevy	DAY	CAR	LVS	ATL	DAR	BRI	TEX	NSH	TAL	CAL	RCH	NHA	NZH	CLT; 18	DOV	KEN; 15	MLW	GLN	CHI	GTY	PPR	IRP	MCH	BRI	DAR	RCH	DOV	KAN	CLT	MEM	PHO	CAR	HOM; 41			75th	267
2002	Jack Sprague	24	Chevy	DAY; 7	CAR; 6	LVS; 6	DAR; 9	BRI; 19	TEX; 2	NSH; 2	TAL; 13	CAL; 4	RCH; 18	NHA; 3	NZH; 26	CLT; 10	DOV; 5	NSH; 1*	KEN; 16	MLW; 14	DAY; 28	CHI; 42	GTY; 4	PPR; 14	IRP; 17	MCH; 15	BRI; 28	DAR; 5	RCH; 33	DOV; 3	KAN; 20	CLT; 25	MEM; 18	ATL; 42	CAR; 10	PHO; 22	HOM; 11		5th	4206
2007	Casey Mears	24	Chevy	DAY; DNQ	CAL; 2	MXC	LVS; 42	ATL; 5	BRI	NSH	TEX; 4	PHO; 7	TAL; 3^{*}	RCH; 7	DAR; 9	CLT; 2	DOV; 4	NSH	KEN	MLW	NHA; 10	DAY; 8	CHI; 13					MCH; 9	BRI; 19	CAL			KAN; 3	CLT	MEM	TEX; 15		HOM; 22	31st	2820
2007	Landon Cassill	24	Chevy																					GTY; 32	IRP; 30	CGV	GLN				RCH; 22	DOV					PHO; 34		31st	2820

=== Car No. 46 history ===
Part Time With Greg Sacks (1990)

During the shooting of Days of Thunder in 1990, Greg Sacks drove the No. 46 twice at Daytona and Charlotte, getting a best finish of 3rd at Daytona.

==== Car No. 46 results ====
Year	Driver	No.	Make	1	2	3	4	5	6	7	8	9	10	11	12	13	14	15	16	17	18	19	20	21	22	23	24	25	26	27	28	29	30	31	Owners	Pts
1990	Greg Sacks	46	Chevy	DAY; 3	RCH	CAR	MAR	HCY	DAR	BRI	LAN	SBO	NZH	HCY	CLT; 12	DOV	ROU	VOL	MYB	OXF	NHA	SBO	DUB	IRP	ROU	BRI	DAR	RCH	DOV	MAR	CLT	NHA	CAR	MAR		

=== Car No. 48 history ===
Part Time With Jimmie Johnson (2004–2007)

The 48 car made its debut in the Busch Series in 2004 at Lowe's Motor Speedway, running a one-race deal with sponsorship from Lowe's and The SpongeBob SquarePants Movie. Jimmie Johnson drove it to a third-place finish. He drove the car for five races in 2005, winning a pole at Lowe's. During 2006, he started three races, both Lowe's races and the Ameriquest 300 at California. His best finish was seventh in the first Lowe's race. Johnson drove the 48 car in the same three Busch races for the 2007 races, with a best finish of fourth at California.

==== Car No. 48 results ====
Year	Driver	No.	Make	1	2	3	4	5	6	7	8	9	10	11	12	13	14	15	16	17	18	19	20	21	22	23	24	25	26	27	28	29	30	31	32	33	34	35	Owners	Pts
2004	Jimmie Johnson	48	Chevy	DAY	CAR	LVS	DAR	BRI	TEX	NSH	TAL	CAL	GTY	RCH	NZH	CLT	DOV	NSH	KEN	MLW	DAY	CHI	NHA	PPR	IRP	MCH	BRI	CAL	RCH	DOV	KAN	CLT; 3	MEM	ATL	PHO	DAR	HOM		76th	170
2005	Jimmie Johnson	48	Chevy	DAY	CAL	MXC	LVS	ATL; 3*	NSH	BRI	TEX	PHO	TAL	DAR	RCH	CLT; 30	DOV	NSH	KEN	MLW	DAY	CHI; 17	NHA	PPR	GTY	IRP	GLN	MCH	BRI	CAL; 11	RCH	DOV	KAN	CLT; 43	MEM	TEX	PHO	HOM	54th	534
2006	Jimmie Johnson	48	Chevy	DAY	CAL	MXC	LVS	ATL	BRI	TEX	NSH	PHO	TAL	RCH	DAR	CLT; 7	DOV	NSH	KEN	MLW	DAY	CHI	NHA	MAR	GTY	IRP	GLN	MCH	BRI	CAL; 21	RCH	DOV	KAN	CLT; 42	MEM	TEX	PHO	HOM	58th	283
2007	Jimmie Johnson	48	Chevy	DAY	CAL	MXC	LVS	ATL	BRI	NSH	TEX	PHO	TAL	RCH	DAR	CLT; 6	DOV	NSH	KEN	MLW	NHA	DAY	CHI	GTY	IRP	CGV	GLN	MCH	BRI	CAL; 4	RCH	DOV	KAN	CLT; 32	MEM	TEX	PHO	HOM	57th	387
2008	Jimmie Johnson	48	Chevy	DAY	CAL	LVS	ATL	BRI	NSH	TEX	PHO	MXC	TAL	RCH	DAR	CLT	DOV	NSH	KEN	MLW	NHA	DAY	CHI	GTY	IRP	CGV	GLN; 29	MCH	BRI	CAL	RCH	DOV	KAN	CLT	MEM	TEX	PHO	HOM	79th	81

=== Car No. 57 history ===
Part Time (2005–2006)

In 2005, Hendrick Motorsports fielded the No. 57, a number taken from the sponsorship of Heinz and its "57 varieties". Several drivers piloted the No. 57 in 2005 and 2006, with Brian Vickers competing in the majority of races. Additional sponsors, including Lowe's and Mountain Dew, signed deals to sponsor the team for certain races.

==== Car No. 57 results ====
Year	Driver	No.	Make	1	2	3	4	5	6	7	8	9	10	11	12	13	14	15	16	17	18	19	20	21	22	23	24	25	26	27	28	29	30	31	32	33	34	35	Owners	Pts
2005	Kyle Busch	57	Chevy	DAY	CAL	MXC	LVS	ATL	NSH	BRI	TEX; DNQ	PHO	TAL		RCH; 23		DOV; 36	NSH	KEN	MLW														CLT; 41	MEM	TEX; 5	PHO		48th	851
2005	Brian Vickers	57	Chevy											DAR; 43		CLT; 13					DAY; 31	CHI	NHA	PPR	GTY			MCH; DNQ	BRI	CAL	RCH	DOV; 8	KAN					HOM; 23	48th	851
2005	Boston Reid	57	Chevy																							IRP; 28	GLN												48th	851
2006	Brian Vickers	57	Chevy	DAY; 32	CAL; 9			ATL; 7	BRI	TEX	NSH	PHO	TAL; 4	RCH	DAR; 12	CLT	DOV	NSH	KEN	MLW	DAY; 2	CHI	NHA	MAR	GTY	IRP		MCH; 16	BRI	CAL	RCH	DOV	KAN	CLT	MEM	TEX	PHO	HOM; 13	44th	1301
2006	Adrián Fernández	57	Chevy			MXC; 12	LVS																				GLN; 17												44th	1301

=== Car No. 80 history ===
Part Time With Tony Stewart (2009)

In 2009, Hendrick Motorsports announced that they would run a No. 80 HendrickCars.com Chevy driven by Tony Stewart in the Xfinity Series Camping World 300 at Daytona. The number 80 represented the number of affiliates in the Hendrick Automotive Group. Stewart won the race in this car, with this being his only race for Hendrick Motorsports while focusing on his team in a partnership with Gene Haas. Stewart–Haas Racing, at the time, received engines, chassis, and technical support from Hendrick Motorsports.

==== Car No. 80 results ====
Year	Driver	No.	Make	1	2	3	4	5	6	7	8	9	10	11	12	13	14	15	16	17	18	19	20	21	22	23	24	25	26	27	28	29	30	31	32	33	34	35	Owners	Pts
2009	Tony Stewart	80	Chevy	DAY; 1	CAL	LVS	BRI	TEX	NSH	PHO	TAL	RCH	DAR	CLT	DOV	NSH	KEN	MLW	NHA	DAY	CHI	GTY	IRP	IOW	GLN	MCH	BRI	CGV	ATL	RCH	DOV	KAN	CAL	CLT	MEM	TEX	PHO	HOM	60th	190

=== Car No. 87 history ===
Part Time With Developmental Drivers (2003–2004)

In 2003, 18-year-old development driver Kyle Busch made his entry into Busch Series, driving a No. 87 car in seven races in an alliance with NEMCO Motorsports (owned by then-Hendrick driver Joe Nemechek). The car received sponsorship from GMAC company Ditech.com, and Busch scored three top tens including two second-place finishes.

For 2004, the alliance with NEMCO continued. Development drivers Blake Feese and Boston Reid ran three races each in the No. 87 ditech.com Chevy, with a best finish of 26th by Reid at Atlanta Motor Speedway.

==== Car No. 87 results ====
Year	Driver	No.	Make	1	2	3	4	5	6	7	8	9	10	11	12	13	14	15	16	17	18	19	20	21	22	23	24	25	26	27	28	29	30	31	32	33	34	Owners	Pts
2003	Kyle Busch	87	Chevy	DAY	CAR	LVS	DAR	BRI	TEX	TAL	NSH	CAL	RCH	GTY	NZH	CLT; 2	DOV	NSH	KEN	MLW	DAY	CHI	NHA	PPR	IRP; 33	MCH	BRI	DAR; 2	RCH	DOV; 15	KAN	CLT	MEM; 16	ATL; 43	PHO	CAR; 7	HOM	18th*	3193*
2004	Blake Feese	87	Chevy	DAY	CAR	LVS	DAR	BRI	TEX	NSH	TAL	CAL	GTY	RCH	NZH	CLT	DOV	NSH	KEN; 41	MLW	DAY	CHI	NHA	PPR	IRP; 33	MCH	BRI	CAL		DOV; 34	KAN							24th*	2640*
2004	Boston Reid	87	Chevy																										RCH; 37			CLT; 42	MEM	ATL; 26	PHO	DAR	HOM	24th*	2640*

- Includes points earned by NEMCO Motorsports. Only results under Hendrick Motorsports are shown.

== NASCAR Craftsman Truck Series ==
=== Truck No. 5 history ===
In 1995, the team fielded the No. 5 DuPont Chevrolet part-time for Terry Labonte. He won once at Richmond. Roger Mears drove the No. 5 truck once at Mesa Marin Raceway sponsored by Budweiser.

==== Truck No. 5 results ====
Year	Driver	No.	Make	1	2	3	4	5	6	7	8	9	10	11	12	13	14	15	16	17	18	19	20	Owners	Pts
1995	Terry Labonte	5	Chevy	PHO; 2	TUS	SGS	MMR	POR	EVG	I70	LVL	BRI	MLW	CNS	HPT; 3	IRP	FLM	RCH; 1	MAR	NWS	SON				
1995	Roger Mears	5	Chevy																			MMR; 29	PHO		

=== Truck No. 17 history ===
The No. 17 Craftsman Truck Series team made its debut in 2000 with Ricky Hendrick driving with GMAC/Quaker State sponsorship. He made six races that season and finished in the top 10 four times. In 2001, Hendrick won his only career Truck race at Kansas Speedway, becoming the youngest driver at the time to win a truck race at the age of 21. He finished sixth in points, runner-up to Travis Kvapil for Rookie of the Year honors. The team did not run after 2001.

==== Truck No. 17 results ====
Year	Driver	No.	Make	1	2	3	4	5	6	7	8	9	10	11	12	13	14	15	16	17	18	19	20	21	22	23	24	Owners	Pts
2000	Ricky Hendrick	17	Chevy	DAY	HOM	PHO	MMR	MAR	PIR	GTY	MEM	PPR; 6	EVG	TEX	KEN	GLN	MLW	NHA; 7	NZH	MCH	IRP; 12	NSV; 9	CIC	RCH; DNQ	DOV; 25	TEX; 8	CAL	30th	846
2001	Ricky Hendrick	17	Chevy	DAY; 2	HOM; 5	MMR; 8	MAR; 9	GTY; 6	DAR; 34	PPR; 5	DOV; 3	TEX; 5	MEM; 7	MLW; 10	KAN; 1	KEN; 6	NHA; 4	IRP; 18	NSH; 11	CIC; 11	NZH; 5	RCH; 8	SBO; 6	TEX; 8	LVS; 6	PHO; 28	CAL; 10	6th	3412

=== Truck No. 24 history ===
The No. 24 truck debuted with the Truck Series in 1995 with Scott Lagasse driving and DuPont sponsoring. Lagasse posted two top-fives and finished ninth in the standings.

In 1996, Jack Sprague drove the No. 24 full-time with Quaker State sponsoring. He won five races and was second in the points. The following season, he won three times and clinched his first NASCAR championship.

The team lost the Quaker State sponsorship after 1997 but signed GMAC Financial as a sponsor after a one-race deal with Big Daddy's BBQ Sauce. He won an additional five races but lost the championship by three points. In 1999, Sprague won the championship again but fell to fifth in 2000. In 2001, NetZero came on board as the team's sponsor, and Sprague won his third championship. After Sprague moved his ride to the Busch Series, Ron Hornaday Jr. drove the No. 24 in a one-race deal at Daytona, finishing twelfth. The team closed after that race to focus on its Busch Series efforts.

==== Truck No. 24 results ====
Year	Driver	No.	Make	1	2	3	4	5	6	7	8	9	10	11	12	13	14	15	16	17	18	19	20	21	22	23	24	25	26	27	Owners	Pts
1995	Scott Lagasse	24	Chevy	PHO; 11	TUS; 6	SGS; 17	MMR; 9	POR; 21	EVG; 14	I70; 12	LVL; 21	BRI; 8	MLW; 14	CNS; 14	HPT; 12	IRP; 5	FLM; 25	RCH; 36	MAR; 16	NWS; 9	SON; 4	MMR; 7	PHO; 13								9th	2470
1996	Jack Sprague	24	Chevy	HOM; 2	PHO; 1	POR; 8	EVG; 12	TUS; 5	CNS; 4	HPT; 2	BRI; 5	NZH; 1	MLW; 1	LVL; 8	I70; 14	IRP; 2	FLM; 5	GLN; 4	NSV; 3	RCH; 29	NHA; 2	MAR; 3	NWS; 2	SON; 6	MMR; 5	PHO; 1	LVS; 1				2nd	3778
1997	Jack Sprague	24	Chevy	WDW; 15	TUS; 7	HOM; 5	PHO; 1	POR; 4	EVG; 2	I70; 10	NHA; 2	TEX; 31	BRI; 7	NZH; 1	MLW; 4	LVL; 8	CNS; 16	HPT; 2	IRP; 2	FLM; 4	NSV; 1	GLN; 3	RCH; 2	MAR; 10	SON; 5	MMR; 10	CAL; 6	PHO; 3	LVS; 2		1st	3969
1998	Jack Sprague	24	Chevy	WDW; 4	HOM; 2	PHO; 2	POR; 4	EVG; 1	I70; 5	GLN; 5	TEX; 6	BRI; 2	MLW; 3	NZH; 10	CAL; 1	PPR; 31	IRP; 1	NHA; 8	FLM; 29	NSV; 11	HPT; 4	LVL; 9	RCH; 1	MEM; 9	GTY; 4	MAR; 10	SON; 9	MMR; 2	PHO; 13	LVS; 1	2nd	4069
1999	Jack Sprague	24	Chevy	HOM; 22	PHO; 2	EVG; 2	MMR; 7	MAR; 3	MEM; 9	PPR; 2	I70; 1	BRI; 1	TEX; 5	PIR; 28	GLN; 3	MLW; 2	NSV; 5	NZH; 13	MCH; 4	NHA; 8	IRP; 34	GTY; 3	HPT; 26	RCH; 5	LVS; 2	LVL; 5	TEX; 11	CAL; 1			1st	3747
2000	Jack Sprague	24	Chevy	DAY; 33	HOM; 3	PHO; 2	MMR; 3	MAR; 3	PIR; 3	GTY; 1	MEM; 1	PPR; 4	EVG; 1	TEX; 28	KEN; 2	GLN; 5	MLW; 8	NHA; 34	NZH; 5	MCH; 13	IRP; 17	NSV; 30	CIC; 17	RCH; 6	DOV; 27	TEX; 22	CAL; 4				5th	3316
2001	Jack Sprague	24	Chevy	DAY; 12	HOM; 3	MMR; 2	MAR; 20	GTY; 8	DAR; 12	PPR; 3	DOV; 2	TEX; 1	MEM; 23	MLW; 2	KAN; 23	KEN; 3	NHA; 1	IRP; 1	NSH; 21	CIC; 9	NZH; 3	RCH; 1	SBO; 4	TEX; 3	LVS; 2	PHO; 2	CAL; 31				1st	3670
2002	Ron Hornaday Jr.	24	Chevy	DAY; 12	DAR	MAR	GTY	PPR	DOV	TEX	MEM	MLW	KAN	KEN	NHA	MCH	IRP	NSH	RCH	TEX	SBO	LVS	CAL	PHO	HOM						53rd	127

=== Truck No. 25 history ===
In 1995, the team fielded the No. 25 Budweiser Chevrolet part-time with Hendrick Sr. and Roger Mears driving. Midway through the season, Jack Sprague came on board to finish out the season for the team, winning a pole at Phoenix International Raceway. In seven races, Sprague had three fourth-place finishes and five top-ten finishes, and no finish worse than twentieth.

==== Truck No. 25 results ====
Year	Driver	No.	Make	1	2	3	4	5	6	7	8	9	10	11	12	13	14	15	16	17	18	19	20	Owners	Pts
1995	Roger Mears	25	Chevy	PHO; 21	TUS	SGS	MMR; 16	POR	EVG	I70	LVL	BRI	MLW	CNS		IRP; 24									
1995	Rick Hendrick	25	Chevy												HPT; 23										
1995	Jack Sprague	25	Chevy														FLM; 4	RCH; 10	MAR; 20	NWS; 4	SON; 11	MMR; 4	PHO; 6		

=== Truck No. 94 history ===
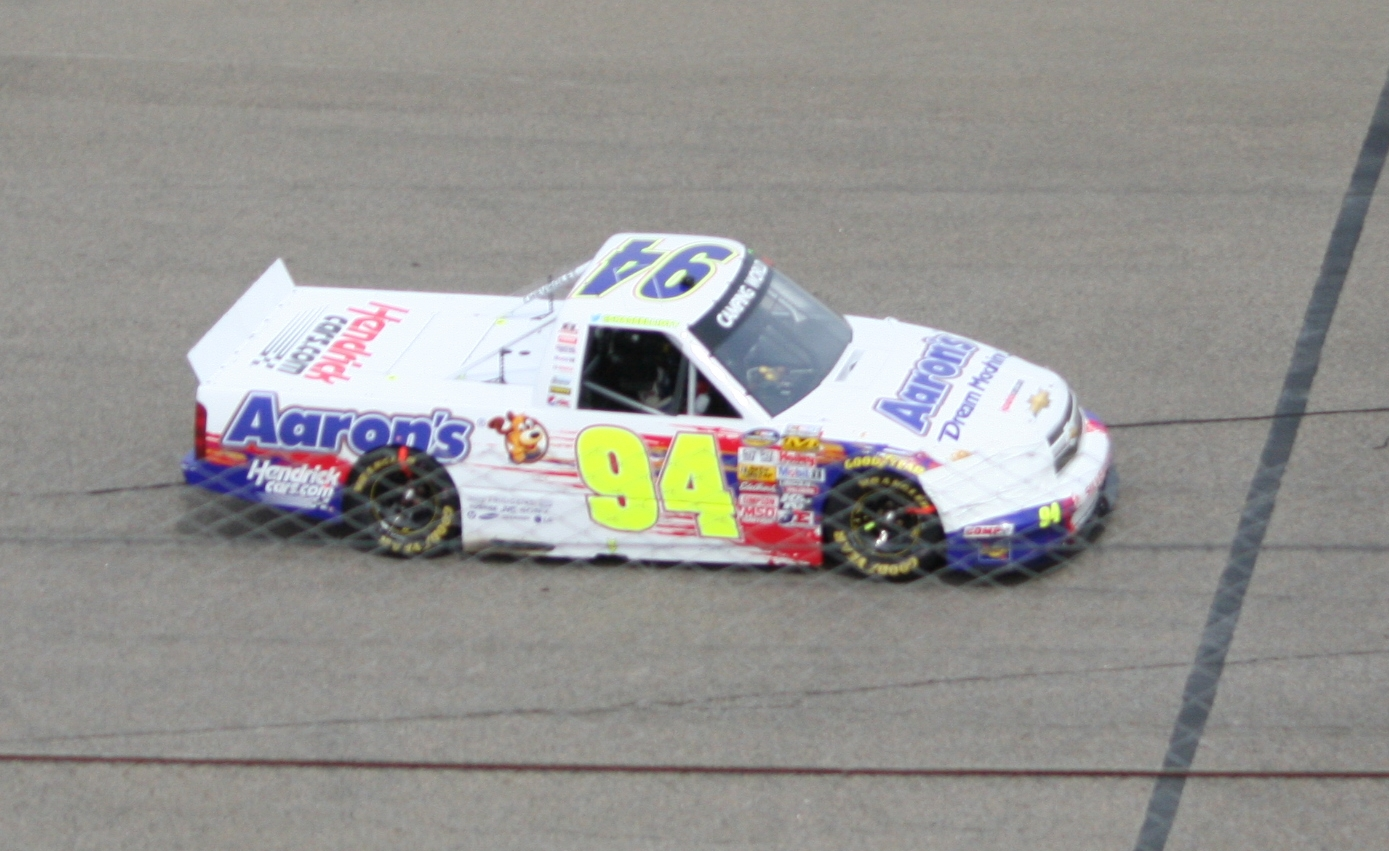
Chase Elliott's No. 94 Aaron's Chevrolet at Rockingham in 2013

Hendrick Motorsports revived its truck program in 2013, fielding a part-time entry for Chase Elliott. The team was sponsored by Aaron's and ran nine races. The trucks were not built directly by Hendrick Motorsports, but were instead provided by Hendrick-affiliated Turner Scott Motorsports. However, the trucks were fielded directly by Hendrick, with crew chief Lance McGrew. Elliott made his debut at Martinsville Speedway on April 6 and finished in the sixth position. Elliott became the youngest pole winner in Truck Series history at the time at Bristol in August, and later the youngest race winner in the Truck Series at the time by winning the inaugural Chevrolet Silverado 250 at Canadian Tire Motorsports Park. Elliott departed the No. 94 to join JR Motorsports in the Nationwide Series in 2014.

==== Truck No. 94 results ====
Year	Driver	No.	Make	1	2	3	4	5	6	7	8	9	10	11	12	13	14	15	16	17	18	19	20	21	22	Owners	Pts
2013	Chase Elliott	94	Chevy	DAY	MAR; 6	CAR; 5	KAN	CLT	DOV; 4	TEX	KEN	IOW; 5	ELD	POC	MCH	BRI; 5	MSP; 1	IOW; 31	CHI	LVS	TAL	MAR; 20	TEX	PHO; 10	HOM	26th	315

== ARCA Racing Series ==
Hendrick fielded cars for five ARCA races from 1985 to 1996, twice for Brett Bodine in 1985 and 1986 (who won the pole for both races), and once each for Tommy Ellis (1988), Jack Sprague (1996), and Rick Hendrick himself. Rick Hendrick drove the No. 15 Tide car at Heartland Park Topeka in 1991, starting third and finishing 23rd after a braking issue in his only career ARCA start. In February 2000, Ricky Hendrick made his Daytona stock car in the ARCA Bondo/Mar-Hyde Series, driving the No. 17 GMAC Chevrolet to a fifth-place finish. Hendrick would run the race again the next year in the renumbered 71 car, finishing 9th.

=== Car No. 5 history ===
In 1985, Hendrick fielded the No. 5 car for one race at IRP with Brett Bodine as the driver. He won the pole and finished 25th after an engine issue.

In 2004, development drivers Blake Feese, Boston Reid, and Kyle Krisiloff ran a combined eight races in ARCA in the No. 5 car fielded by Bobby Gerhart Racing. Feese scored a win at Nashville, while Krisiloff scored a victory at Chicagoland Speedway.

==== Car No. 5 results ====
Year	Driver	No.	Make	1	2	3	4	5	6	7	8	9	10	11	12	13	14	15	16	17	18	19	20	21	22	Owners	Pts
1985	Brett Bodine	5	Pontiac	ATL	DAY	ATL	TAL	ATL	SSP	IRP; 25*	CSP	FRS	IRP	OEF	ISF	DSF	TOL										
2004	Blake Feese	5	Chevy	DAY	NSH; 1	SLM	KEN; 8		CLT; 7																		
2004	Boston Reid	5	Chevy					TOL; 3		KAN; 8	POC	MCH	SBO	BLN	KEN; 6	GTW	POC	LER									
2004	Kyle Krisiloff	5	Chevy																NSH; 2	ISF	TOL	DSF	CHI; 1	SLM	TAL		

=== Car No. 6 history ===
In 2004, Kyle Krisiloff made his ARCA Re/Max Series debut in the No. 6 Chevy at Lake Erie, where he finished 9th.

==== Car No. 6 results ====
Year	Driver	No.	Make	1	2	3	4	5	6	7	8	9	10	11	12	13	14	15	16	17	18	19	20	21	22	Owners	Pts
2004	Kyle Krisiloff	6	Chevy	DAY	NSH	SLM	KEN	TOL	CLT	KAN	POC	MCH	SBO	BLN	KEN	GTW	POC	LER; 9	NSH	ISF	TOL	DSF	CHI	SLM	TAL		

=== Car No. 7 history ===
In 2004, Boston Reid ran the No. 7 Chevy fielded by Bobby Gerhart Racing at Talladega. He finished 23rd.

Kyle Krisiloff ran the No. 7 Bobby Gerhart Racing Chevy in 14 races in 2005, with sponsorship from Ditech.com and Delphi. Krisiloff scored three top-fives and five top-tens.

==== Car No. 7 results ====
Year	Driver	No.	Make	1	2	3	4	5	6	7	8	9	10	11	12	13	14	15	16	17	18	19	20	21	22	23	Owners	Pts
2004	Boston Reid	7	Chevy	DAY	NSH	SLM	KEN	TOL	CLT	KAN	POC	MCH	SBO	BLN	KEN; 6	GTW	POC	LER	NSH	ISF	TOL	DSF	CHI	SLM	TAL; 23			
2005	Kyle Krisiloff	7	Chevy	DAY	NSH; 13	SLM	KEN; 36	TOL	LAN	MIL; 16	POC; 7	MCH; 5	KAN; 2	KEN; 6	BLN	POC; 32	GTW; 33	LER	NSH; 34	MCH; 37	ISF	TOL	DSF	CHI; 23	SLM	TAL; 2		

=== Car No. 9 history ===
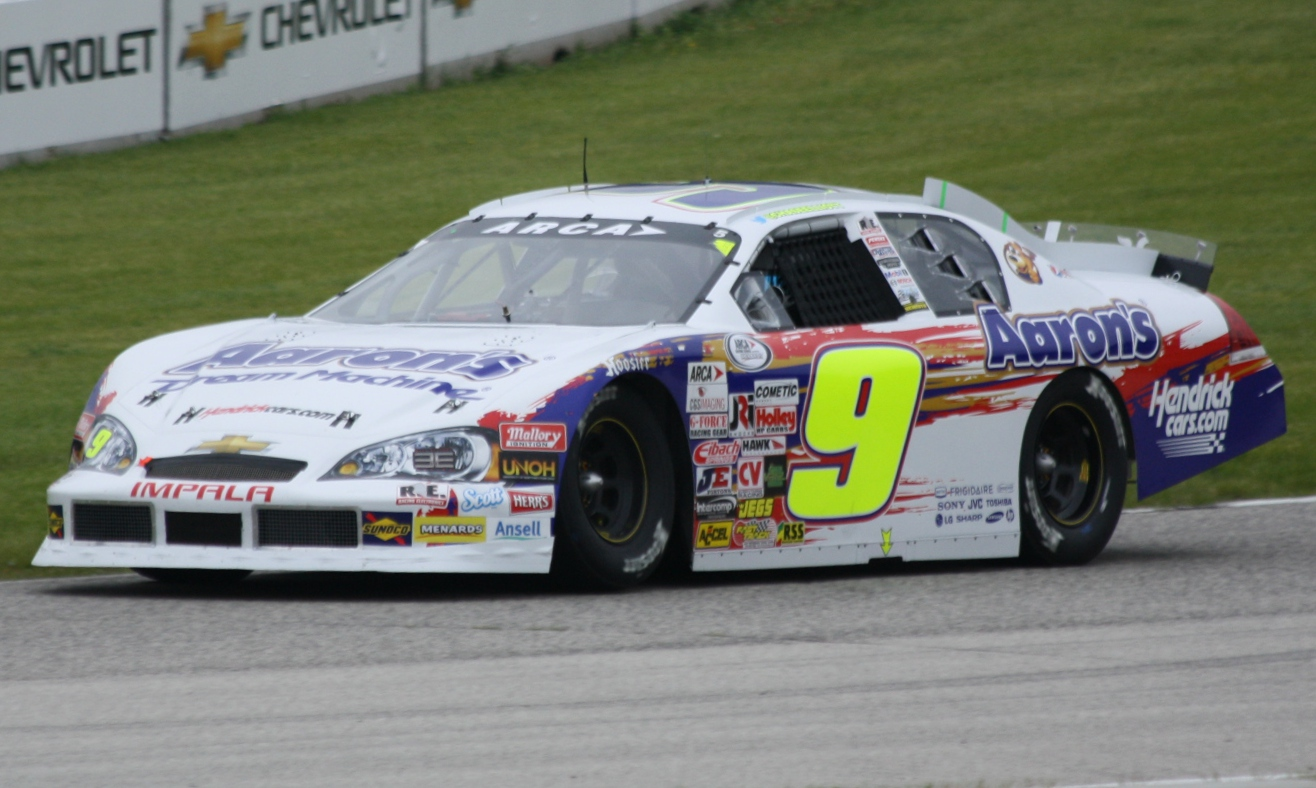
Chase Elliott's No. 9 Aaron's Chevrolet at Road America in 2013

In 2012, Hendrick began fielding the No. 9 Chevrolet for development driver Chase Elliott, with father Bill Elliott as the listed owner and sponsorship from the Aaron's Company. Longtime Hendrick Motorsports crew chief Lance McGrew served as the team's crew chief. Elliott made his debut at age 16 at Mobile International Speedway, scoring a pole and six top tens in six races.

Elliott returned to the team in 2013, scoring his first career win at Pocono Raceway. Elliott, at the age of seventeen, became the youngest superspeedway winner in ARCA Racing Series history, beating fellow 17-year-old Erik Jones. Elliott scored four top tens, including the win at Pocono, in five races in 2013.

Elliott ran the 2014 ARCA season opener at Daytona, in order to gain NASCAR approval to run the Nationwide Series race the next week. Sponsored by HendrickCars.com and NAPA Brakes, Elliott was involved in a fifteen-car crash on the thirteenth lap. In spite of that, Elliott finished ninth, and NASCAR approved him to run on superspeedways; he would go on to win the Nationwide Series Championship.

==== Car No. 9 results ====
Year	Driver	No.	Make	1	2	3	4	5	6	7	8	9	10	11	12	13	14	15	16	17	18	19	20	21	Owners	Pts
2012	Chase Elliott	9	Chevy	DAY	MOB; 10	SLM; 4	TAL	TOL	ELK	POC	MCH	WIN	NJE; 2	IOW	CHI	IRP	POC	BLN; 7	ISF	MAD; 8	SLM; 3	DSF; C	KAN			
2013	Chase Elliott	9	Chevy	DAY	MOB	SLM	TAL	TOL	ELK	POC; 1	MCH	ROA; 4	WIN	CHI	NJE; 3*	POC; 9	BLN	ISF	MAD	DSF	IOW	SLM	KEN; 27	KAN		
2014	Chase Elliott	9	Chevy	DAY; 9	MOB	SLM	TAL	TOL	NJE	POC	MCH	ELK	WIN	CHI	IRP	POC	BLN	ISF	MAD	DSF	SLM	KEN	KAN			

=== Car No. 15 history ===
In 1986, Hendrick fielded the No. 15 car for one race at Atlanta with Brett Bodine as the driver. He won the pole and finished second.

In 1991, Rick Hendrick drove the No. 15 Tide car at Heartland Park Topeka. He started third and finished 23rd after a braking issue in his only career ARCA start.

==== Car No. 15 results ====
Year	Driver	No.	Make	1	2	3	4	5	6	7	8	9	10	11	12	13	14	15	16	17	18	19	20	Owners	Pts
1986	Brett Bodine	15	Pontiac	ATL; 2	DAY	ATL	TAL	SIR	SSP	FRS	KIL	CSP	TAL	BLN	ISF	DSF	TOL	MCS	ATL						
1991	Rick Hendrick	15	Chevy	DAY	ATL	KIL	TAL	TOL	FRS	POC	MCH	KIL	FRS	DEL	POC	TAL	HPT; 23	MCH	ISF	TOL	DSF	TWS	ATL		

=== Car No. 17 history ===
In 2000, Ricky Hendrick made his ARCA Bondo/Mar-Hyde Series debut at Charlotte driving the No. 17 GMAC Chevrolet to a fifth-place finish.

==== Car No. 17 results ====
Year	Driver	No.	Make	1	2	3	4	5	6	7	8	9	10	11	12	13	14	15	16	17	18	19	20	Owners	Pts
2000	Ricky Hendrick	17	Chevy	DAY	SLM	AND	CLT	KIL	FRS	MCH	POC	TOL	KEN	BLN	POC	WIN	ISF	KEN	DSF	SLM	CLT; 5	TAL	ATL		

=== Car No. 18 history ===
In 1988, Hendrick fielded the No. 18 car for Tommy Ellis at Atlanta, where he finished 2nd.

==== Car No. 18 results ====
Year	Driver	No.	Make	1	2	3	4	5	6	7	8	9	10	11	12	13	14	15	16	17	18	19	Owners	Pts
1988	Tommy Ellis	18	Chevy	DAY	ATL	TAL	FRS	PCS	ROC	POC	WIN	KIL	ACS	SLM	POC	TAL	DEL	FRS	ISF	DSF	SLM	ATL; 2		

=== Car No. 44 history ===
In 1996, Jack Sprague drove the No. 44 Chevy at Talladega, where he finished 4th.

==== Car No. 44 results ====
Year	Driver	No.	Make	1	2	3	4	5	6	7	8	9	10	11	12	13	14	15	16	17	18	19	20	21	22	23	24	25	Owners	Pts
1996	Jack Sprague	44	Chevy	DAY	ATL	SLM	TAL; 4	FIF	LVL	CLT	CLT	KIL	FRS	POC	MCH	FRS	TOL	POC	MCH	INF	SBS	ISF	DSF	KIL	SLM	WIN	CLT	ATL		

=== Car No. 71 history ===
In 2001, Ricky Hendrick would run the race at Daytona in the No. 71 GMAC Chevrolet. He finished 9th-place.

==== Car No. 71 results ====
Year	Driver	No.	Make	1	2	3	4	5	6	7	8	9	10	11	12	13	14	15	16	17	18	19	20	21	22	23	24	25	Owners	Pts
2001	Ricky Hendrick	71	Chevy	DAY; 9*	NSH	WIN	SLM	GTY	KEN	CLT	KAN	MCH	POC	MEM	GLN	KEN	MCH	POC	NSH	ISF	CHI	DSF	SLM	TOL	BLN	CLT	TAL	ATL		

=== Car No. 87 history ===
In 2003, Hendrick fielded Kyle Busch in the ARCA RE/MAX Series for seven races. Busch drove the No. 87 Ditech.com Chevrolet (the same car he drove in his Busch Series starts) to three poles and two wins. Busch ran the 2004 season opener at Daytona, starting second and finishing first.

In 2007, Hendrick Motorsports resurrected the No. 87 for development driver Landon Cassill, with sponsorship from Stanley Tools. Cassill attempted three races (failing to qualify at Talladega) with two top ten starts but finishes of 38th at Kentucky and 32nd at Pocono. Cassill and Stanley would move to the 88 under the JR Motorsports banner for 2008.

==== Car No. 87 results ====
Year	Driver	No.	Make	1	2	3	4	5	6	7	8	9	10	11	12	13	14	15	16	17	18	19	20	21	22	23	Owners	Pts
2003	Kyle Busch	87	Chevy	DAY	ATL	NSH; 1*	SLM	TOL	KEN; 1*	CLT; 11	BLN	KAN	MCH; 36	LER	POC	POC; 25*	NSH	ISF	WIN	DSF	CHI	SLM	TAL; 28	CLT; 17	SBO			
2004	Kyle Busch	87	Chevy	DAY; 1*	NSH	SLM	KEN	TOL	CLT	KAN	POC	MCH	SBO	BLN	KEN	GTW	POC	LER	NSH	ISF	TOL	DSF	CHI	SLM	TAL			
2007	Landon Cassill	87	Chevy	DAY	USA	NSH	SLM	KAN	WIN	KEN	TOL	IOW	POC	MCH	BLN	KEN; 38	POC; 32*	NSH	ISF	MIL	GTW	DSF	CHI	SLM	TAL; DNQ	TOL		

=== Car No. 94 history ===
In 2004, Blake Feese ran a single race in the No. 94 Carquest Auto Parts Chevy out of the Hendrick stable at Talladega, scoring the victory.

In 2005, Blake Feese ran the Daytona season opener in the 94 car, and was involved in a pit road crash that injured four photographers.

==== Car No. 94 results ====
Year	Driver	No.	Make	1	2	3	4	5	6	7	8	9	10	11	12	13	14	15	16	17	18	19	20	21	22	23	Owners	Pts
2004	Blake Feese	94	Chevy	DAY	NSH	SLM	KEN	TOL	CLT	KAN	POC	MCH	SBO	BLN	KEN	GTW	POC	LER	NSH	ISF	TOL	DSF	CHI	SLM	TAL; 1*			
2005	Blake Feese	94	Chevy	DAY; 36	NSH	SLM	KEN	TOL	LAN	MIL	POC	MCH	KAN	KEN	BLN	POC	GTW	LER	NSH	MCH	ISF	TOL	DSF	CHI	SLM	TAL		

=== ARCA Series wins ===
2003

- PFG Lester 150 at Nashville Superspeedway – Kyle Busch
- The Channel 5 205 at Kentucky Speedway – Kyle Busch

2004

- Advance Discount Auto Parts 200 at Daytona International Speedway – Kyle Busch
- PFG Lester 150 at Nashville Superspeedway – Blake Feese
- ReadyHosting.com 200 at Chicagoland Speedway – Kyle Krisiloff
- Food World 300 at Talladega Superspeedway – Blake Feese

2013

- Pocono ARCA 200 at Pocono Raceway – Chase Elliott

== IndyCar Series ==
In 2024, Hendrick Motorsports entered the 2024 Indianapolis 500. They partnered with Arrow McLaren to field the No. 17 for Kyle Larson. He would become the fifth driver to attempt the Double. On April 1, 2025, the team announced that Larson would attempt to run the 2025 Indianapolis 500.

=== IndyCar Series results ===
(key)

Year	Chassis	Engine	Drivers	No.	1	2	3	4	5	6	7	8	9	10	11	12	13	14	15	16	17	18	Pos.	Pts.
Arrow McLaren with Hendrick Motorsports
2024					STP	TRM	LBH	ALA	IMS	INDY	DET	ROA	LAG	MDO	IOW	IOW	TOR	GTW	POR	MIL	MIL	NSH		
2024	Dallara DW12	Chevrolet IndyCar V6t	(United States) Kyle Larson R	17						18													36th	21
2025					STP	TRM	LBH	ALA	IMS	INDY	DET	GTW	ROA	MDO	IOW	IOW	TOR	LAG	POR	MIL	NSH			
2025	Dallara DW12	Chevrolet IndyCar V6t	(United States) Kyle Larson	17						24													33rd	6

== 24 Hours of Le Mans ==
In 2023, Hendrick Motorsports entered the 24 Hours of Le Mans, working with NASCAR, Chevrolet, Goodyear, and IMSA to field a modified version of the Next Gen car in the experimental Garage 56 category. The Camaro ZL1 was 'largely unchanged' from the Cup Series car. Modifications included real headlights and taillights, a larger fuel tank, uprated carbon ceramic brakes, as well as new tyres developed by Goodyear.

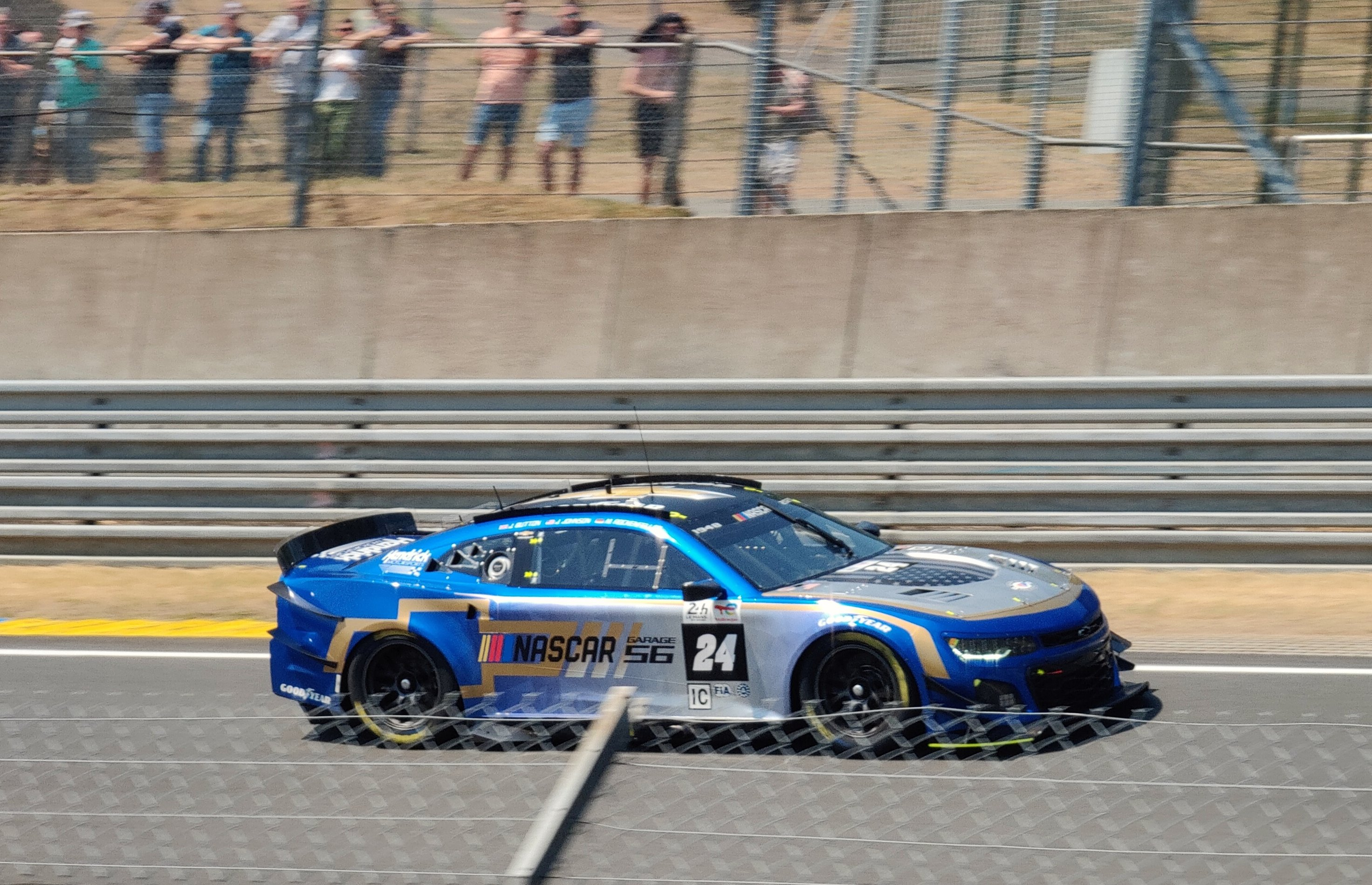
The No. 24 Chevrolet Camaro ZL1 at the 2023 24 Hours of Le Mans

The car, bearing long-time Hendrick Motorsports number 24, was driven by long-time Hendrick driver Jimmie Johnson, 2010 Le Mans winner Mike Rockenfeller, and 2009 Formula 1 World Champion Jenson Button. The car ultimately finished 39th out of 62 total competitors, and outperformed entries in the GTE Am class, the car's closest equivalents.

The car was later featured in the 2023 Goodwood Festival of Speed.

=== 24 Hours of Le Mans results ===
Year	Entrant	No.	Car	Drivers	Class	Laps	Pos.	Class Pos.
2023	(United States) Hendrick Motorsports	24	Chevrolet Camaro ZL1	(United Kingdom) Jenson Button (United States) Jimmie Johnson (Germany) Mike Rockenfeller	Innovative	285	39th	—

== Plane crash ==
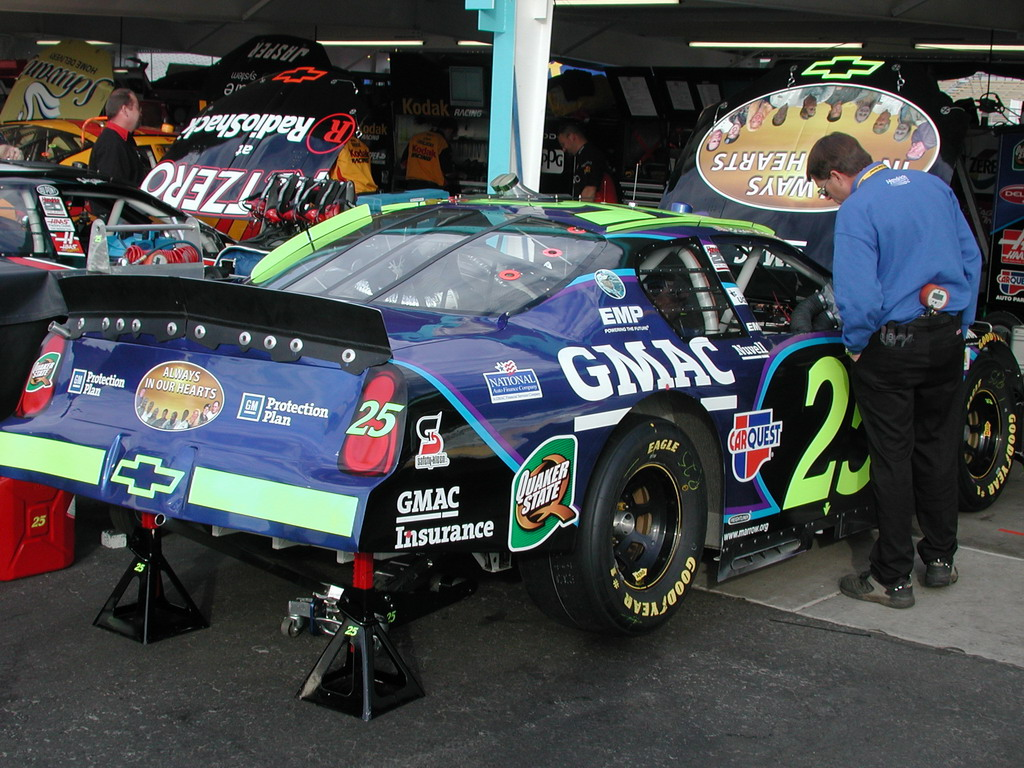
Brian Vickers' No. 25 Ditech/GMAC Chevrolet, which pays tribute to the ten people killed in an October 2004 plane crash

On October 24, 2004, ten people associated with Hendrick Motorsports lost their lives in a plane crash while en route from Concord, North Carolina, to a small airport near the Martinsville Speedway. The plane crashed in heavy fog into Bull Mountain, seven miles (11 km) from the Blue Ridge Airport in Stuart, Virginia, after a failed attempt to land. Ten people aboard the Beechcraft King Air 200 died. Six were Hendrick family members and/or Hendrick Motorsports employees: John Hendrick, the owner's brother and president of Hendrick Motorsports; Jeff Turner, general manager of Hendrick Motorsports; Ricky Hendrick, a Hendrick Motorsports driver and its owner's son; Kimberly and Jennifer Hendrick, John Hendrick's twin daughters; and Randy Dorton, chief engine builder. Also dead were the plane's pilots, Richard Tracy and Elizabeth Morrison, Joe Jackson, director of the DuPont Motorsports program, and Scott Lathram, who worked for Joe Gibbs Racing as a helicopter pilot.

NASCAR officials learned of the crash during that day's Subway 500 race in Martinsville, Virginia; they withheld the information from drivers until the end of the race, which was won by Hendrick driver Jimmie Johnson. For the rest of the 2004 season, all Hendrick Motorsports cars and the No. 0 Haas CNC Racing car featured pictures of the crash victims on the hood, accompanied by the phrase "Always in our hearts".
