= John Hendrick =

John Hendrick may refer to:

- John Hendrick (American football), American college football coach and former professional player
- John Kerr Hendrick, member of the U.S. House of Representatives from Kentucky
