= 2004 in aviation =

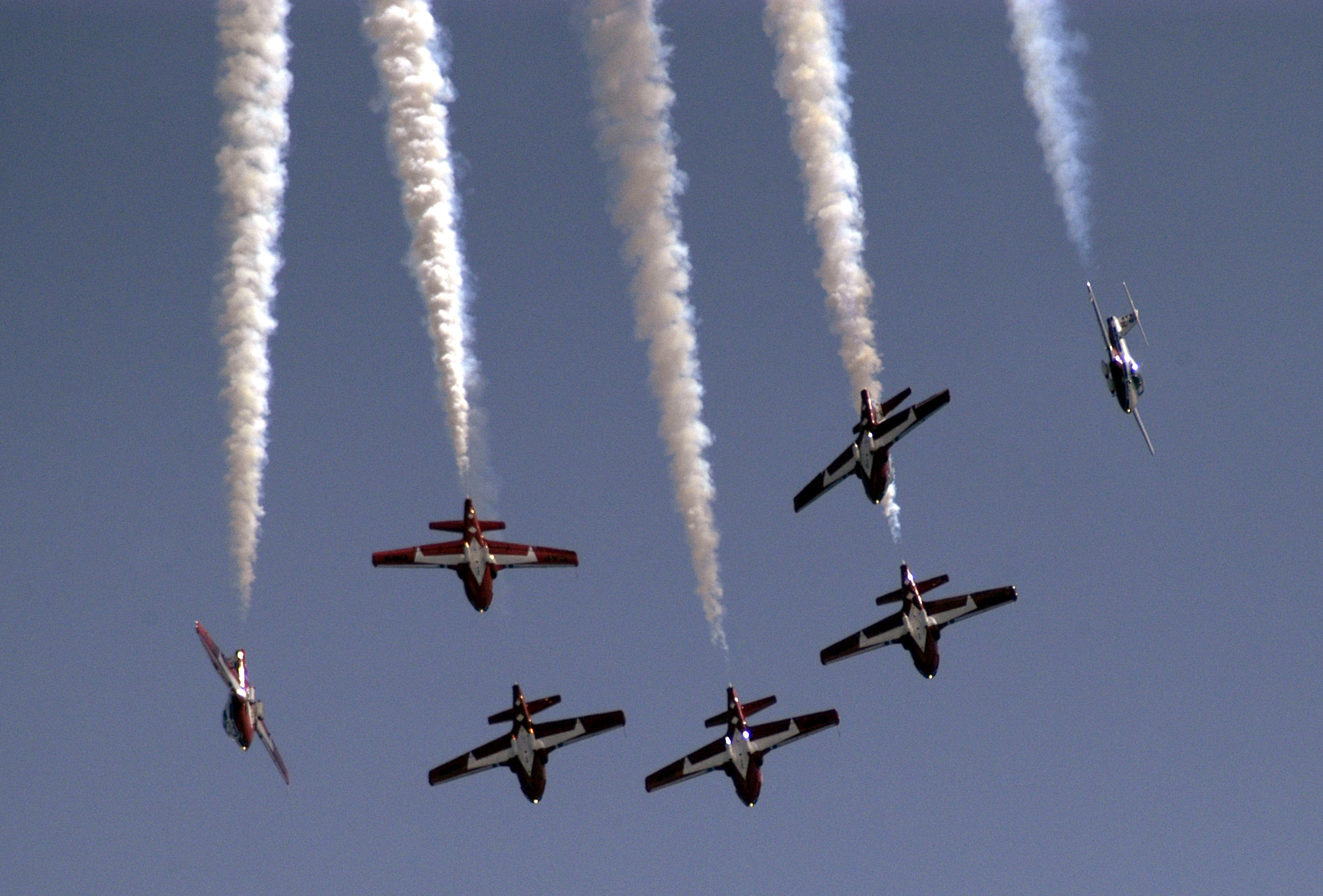
Andrews Air Force Base, Md. (May 14, 2004) - The Canadian Forces air demonstration team, "Snowbirds," prepare to separate from each other as they dive towards show center at the 2004 Joint Service Open House. The "Snowbirds" fly a show consisting of nine Canadair CT-114 Tutor basic pilot training aircraft. The Open House, held on May 14-16th at Andrews Air Force Base, Md., showcased civilian and military aircraft from the Nation's armed forces, which provided many flight demonstrations and static displays. U.S. Navy photo by Photographer's Mate 2nd Class Daniel J. McLain.

This is a list of aviation-related events from 2004.

== Events ==
=== January ===
- 2 January – Several British Airways flights from London Heathrow Airport to Washington, D.C., and Riyadh, Saudi Arabia are cancelled due to security fears.
- 3 January – Flash Airlines Flight 604, a chartered Boeing 737-3Q8, crashes into the Red Sea off the coast of Egypt, killing all 148 aboard.
- 13 January – Uzbekistan Airways Flight 1154, an Yakovlev Yak-40 crashes in Uzbekistan's capital of Tashkent, killing all 37 aboard.

=== February ===
- Thai AirAsia begins flight operations, offering domestic airline service in Thailand.
- The Spanish airline Vueling is founded. It will begin flight operations in July.
- The Belgium-based airline BelgiumExel is founded and begins flight operations.
- 10 February – Kish Air Flight 7170, a Fokker 50 registered EP-LCA, crashes into the ground while on final approach to a landing at Sharjah International Airport in Sharjah in the United Arab Emirates, killing 43 of the 46 people on board and injuring all three survivors.
- 12 February – United Airlines creates a new airline, Ted, to serve as a divisional brand of United serving the low-cost vacation market.
- 19 February – The Evergreen 747 Supertanker makes its first flight. Based on the Boeing 747-200 cargo aircraft and capable of carrying 19,600 U.S. gallons (16,320 Imperial gallons; 74,194 liters) of water, it is the world's largest aerial firefighting aircraft.
- 23 February – The US Army cancels the Boeing-Sikorsky RAH-66 Comanche attack helicopter program. It had been planned to purchase as many as 650 Comanches, but it was argued that cancellation would free up funds for more urgent army aviation priorities. A total of $6.9 billion had already been spent on the RAH-66.

=== March ===
- 27 March – NASA's X-43 pilotless plane breaks world speed record for an atmospheric engine by briefly flying at 7,700 kilometers (4,800 mi) per hour (seven times the speed of sound)
- 31 March – Mexicana leaves the Star Alliance.

=== April ===
- 4 April – Alaska Airlines discontinues service between San Francisco and Tucson.
- 14 April – Rico Linhas Aéreas Flight 4815, an Embraer EMB 120ER Brasilia, crashes on approach to a landing at Manaus, Brazil, killing all 33 people on board.
- 26 April – Alaska Airlines begins service between Seattle and Chicago-O'Hare.

=== May ===
- US Airways joins Star Alliance.
- Bucharest Otopeni International Airport in Bucharest, Romania, is renamed Bucharest Henri Coandă International Airport.
- 1 May – The British airline Duo Airways (formerly Maersk Air UK) ceases operations, with at least four of its seven aircraft impounded at Birmingham Airport.
- 5 May – Air France and Netherlands-based KLM (Royal Dutch Airlines) merge to form the new airline Air France–KLM.
- 9 May
  - Southwest Airlines begins service to Philadelphia International Airport in Philadelphia, Pennsylvania.
  - American Eagle Flight 5401, an ATR 72, crashes on landing at Luis Muñoz Marín International Airport in San Juan, Puerto Rico, injuring 17 of the 26 people on board.
- 12 May
  - The last F-4 Phantom II fighters are withdrawn from Israeli Air Force service.
  - Irish airline JetGreen Airways, which had only begun operations with a single Boeing 757 wet leased from Icelandair on 4 May, ceases operations.
- 23 May – Frontier Airlines begins service to Philadelphia, Pennsylvania; Billings, Montana; and Spokane, Washington.
- 25 May – Australian low cost airline Jetstar Airways begins operations.
- 27 May – Delta Air Lines begins service between Cincinnati, Ohio, and New Haven, Connecticut.

=== June ===
- 1 June
  - Air Baltic launches service from Vilnius, Lithuania, initially to five destinations.
  - America West Airlines starts service between Phoenix and Anchorage.
- 6 June – Alaska Airlines starts service between Denver and Anchorage and discontinues service between San Jose and Tucson.
- 16 June – Atlantic Coast Airlines begins service as a low-cost carrier under the new name Independence Air.
- 18 June – The first missile strike by an American unmanned aerial vehicle inside Pakistan takes place when an AGM-114 Hellfire fired by an MQ-1 Predator strikes the house of local Taliban commander Nek Muhammad Wazir in Kari Kot, South Waziristan, killing him, his two brothers, and two bodyguards.
- 20 June – Frontier Airlines begins service to Nashville, Tennessee.
- 21 June – SpaceShipOne is the first non-government-built spacecraft to transport a person into space and return safely to earth.
- 26 June – Belavia inaugurates service between Belarus and Hanover, Germany.
- 29 June – Aboard Northwest Airlines Flight 327, a Boeing 757-200 bound from Detroit Metropolitan Wayne County Airport in Romulus, Michigan, to Los Angeles International Airport in Los Angeles, California, journalist Annie Jacobsen, a writer for WomensWallStreet, and her family report to air marshals that 14 Syrian men – musicians traveling to a performance – aboard the airliner are acting suspiciously and may be performing a "dry run" for a future terrorist attack. The air marshals disagree, and the Jacobsen family becomes so agitated and vocal that the air marshals begin to suspect them of trying to draw out the air marshals so that terrorists can target the marshals. Jacobsen later writes about the incident, bringing it to national attention in the United States.

=== July ===
- 1 July
  - The Spanish airline Vueling begins flight operations.
  - Cape Air begins flights in the Mariana Islands. It operates under the Continental Connection brand.
- 13 July – Air Moldova becomes a member of the International Air Transport Association.
- 14–20 July – The 14th FAI World Rally Flying Championship takes place in Herning, Denmark. Individual winners: 1. Jiří Filip & Michal Filip (Czech), 2. František Cihlář & Milos Fiala (Czech), 3. Krzysztof Wieczorek & Krzysztof Skrętowicz (Poland); team winners: 1. Czech Republic, 2. Poland, 3. France.
- 19–24 July – The 16th FAI World Precision Flying Championship takes place in Herning, Denmark. Individual winners: Krzysztof Wieczorek (Poland) – 3Xtrim, 2. Petr Opat (Czech) – Cessna 152, 3. Wacław Wieczorek (Poland) – PZL Wilga 2000; team winners: 1. Poland, 2. Czech Republic, 3. France.
- 23 July – Air Ukraine's air operator's certificate is revoked. The airline had not operated since declaring bankruptcy in December 2002.

=== August ===
- 4 August – Independence Air's status as a United Express carrier comes to an end.
- 9 August – Several member states of the Pacific Islands Forum sign the Pacific Islands Civil Aviation Safety and Security Treaty in Apia, Samoa. The treaty will enter into force on 11 June 2005. It formally confirms the Pacific Aviation Safety Office, which had been formed informally in 2002.
- 13 August – Air Tahoma Flight 185, a Convair 580 on a cargo flight, runs out of fuel due to pilot error and crashes short of the runway on final approach to Cincinnati/Northern Kentucky International Airport in Hebron, Kentucky, killing one of its two crew members.
- 24 August – After departing Domodedovo International Airport in Moscow, Volga-AviaExpress Flight 1303, a Tupolev Tu-134 (NATO reporting name "Crusty"), explodes over Russia's Tula Oblast and crashes, killing all 43 people on board. Minutes later, Siberia Airlines Flight 1047, a Tupolev Tu-154 (NATO reporting name "Careless") which also had departed Domodedovo International, explodes over Russia's Rostov Oblast and crashes, killing all 46 people on board. The Russian government declares the explosions to have been caused by female Chechen suicide bombers.

=== September ===
- KLM Cargo joins the Skyteam Cargo airline alliance.
- 7 September – Indonesian human-rights and anti-corruption activist Munir Said Thalib dies of arsenic poisoning on a Garuda Indonesia flight from Jakarta, Indonesia, to Amsterdam in the Netherlands. The victim of an assassination, he apparently had been poisoned during a stopover in Singapore.
- 13 September – Continental Airlines, Northwest Airlines, and KLM join the Skyteam airline alliance. It is the largest expansion of an airline alliance in history and makes Skyteam the second-largest alliance, moving it ahead of Oneworld. With the expansion, Skyteam serves more than 341 million customers, with 14,320 daily flights to 658 destinations in 130 countries.

=== October ===
- Air Baltic is rebranded as airBaltic.
- 1 October – American multi-sport athlete and former All-American Girls Professional Baseball League player Gertrude Dunn is killed when the Piper PA-28-180 Archer she is piloting crashes due to engine failure on takeoff from New Garden Airport in Avondale, Pennsylvania.
- 3 October – Iraqi Airways makes an international flight for the first time since the Gulf War broke out in January 1991, flying from Baghdad, Iraq, to Amman, Jordan.
- 4 October – SpaceShipOne successfully makes its third flight into space. It wins the Ansari X-Prize for proving to be a plausible option for space tourism.
- 14 October
  - MK Airlines Flight 1602, a Boeing 747-200F cargo aircraft, strikes the ground and crashes immediately after takeoff from Halifax Stanfield International Airport in Enfield, Nova Scotia, Canada, killing its entire crew of seven.
  - During a ferry flight with no one else aboard, the pilot and copilot of Pinnacle Airlines Flight 3701, a Bombardier CRJ-200, decide to test the performance limits of the aircraft by pushing it to its maximum approved altitude of 41,000 feet (12,000 meters). They conduct various non-standard maneuvers and reach the altitude, but overstress the engines, flame out, and stall. They recover from the stall at 38,000 feet (12,000 meters) and enter a glide. Never able to restart the engines and unable to glide far enough to reach any of six airfields they are advised to divert to, they eventually crash near Jefferson City, Missouri. Both pilots die in the crash.
- 19 October – Corporate Airlines Flight 5966, a British Aerospace Jetstream 32, crashes on approach to Kirksville Regional Airport in Adair County, Missouri, near Kirksville, killing 13 of the 15 people on board and injuring both survivors.
- 24 October – Flying in heavy fog, a Beechcraft Super King Air 200 owned by Hendrick Motorsports crashes into Bull Mountain, seven miles (11 kilometers) from Blue Ridge Airport in Martinsville, Virginia, killing all 10 people on board. Former NASCAR Busch Series driver and owner Ricky Hendrick and Hendrick Motorsports Director of Engine Operations and lead engine builder Randy Dorton are among the dead.
- 28 October – Boeing ceases production of the Boeing 757 airliner after manufacturing 1,050 of the aircraft for 54 customers.
- 29 October – the Government of Benin establishes the Agence Nationale de l'Aviation Civile du Bénin ("Benin National Civil Aviation Agency") as Benin's national civil aviation authority. It replaces the Direction de l’Aviation Civil ("Directorate of Civil Aviation").

=== November ===
- 1 November – The second revival of Pan American Airways – nicknamed "Pan Am III" by some people – which had begun service in October 1999, ceases operations and turns its operations over to Boston-Maine Airways.
- 2 November – Independence Air's status as a Delta Connection carrier comes to an end.
- 3 November – Blue1 joins the Star Alliance as its first regional member.
- 16 November – The National Aeronautics and Space Administration's X-43 reaches a record speed of Mach 9.8 (7,546 mph (12,144 km/h).
- 18 November – Adria Airways and Croatia Airlines join the Star Alliance.
- 21 November – China Eastern Airlines Flight 5210, a Bombardier CRJ-200LR, crashes into a park just after takeoff from Baotou Erliban Airport in Baotou, China, killing all 53 people on the aircraft and two people on the ground. An investigation finds that icing caused the crash.
- 30 November – Lion Air Flight 583, a McDonnell Douglas MD-82 with 156 people on board, overruns the runway on landing in a hard rain at Adi Sumarmo Airport in Surakarta, Indonesia, and crashes, killing 25 people and injuring all 138 survivors.

=== December ===
- The Indonesian airline Awair, which had suspended its operations in March 2002, resumes flights, now as an associate of AirAsia.
- 9 December
  - United Airlines becomes the first American airline to land in Ho Chi Minh City, Vietnam, since Operation Frequent Wind during the fall of Saigon in April 1975.
  - The United States Army issues a request for proposals for the Armed Reconnaissance Helicopter (ARH). Ultimately, this will lead to the development of the Bell ARH-70 Arapaho.
- 10 December
- The United States Federal Aviation Administration issues an Emergency Airworthiness Directive effectively grounding the entire U.S. fleet of Beechcraft T-34 Mentor aircraft. The directive is in response to fatal in-flight structural failure accidents during simulated aerial combat flights.

== First flights ==
- Aero-Cam Slick 360

=== February ===
- 19 February – Evergreen 747 Supertanker

=== March ===
- 5 March – Virgin Atlantic GlobalFlyer
- 12 March – Embraer 190

=== May ===
- 29 May – Aceair AERIKS 200
- 29 May – NAL Saras

=== June ===
- 18 June – Airblue flies its first flight, a private airline in Pakistan
- 21 June – First sub-orbital flight of SpaceShipOne

=== July ===
- 8 July – HESA Saeqeh
- 15 July – Aermacchi M-346
- 20 July – Aerocomp Comp Air Jet

=== August ===
- 26 August – BAE Systems Nimrod MRA4

=== October ===
- 16 October – Quest Kodiak

=== December ===
- 17 December – Antonov An-148
- 18 December – Bell 210
- 31 December – Eclipse 500

== Entered service ==
- AgustaWestland Apache with the British Army

== Deadliest crash ==
The deadliest crash of this year was Flash Airlines Flight 604, a Boeing 737 which crashed into the Red Sea near Sharm El Sheikh, Egypt on 3 January, killing all 148 people on board.
