= 18th FAI World Precision Flying Championship =

18th FAI World Precision Flying Championship took place between July 13 - July 19, 2008 in Ried im Innkreis in Austria, altogether with the 16th FAI World Rally Flying Championship (July 20-26).

There were 62 competitors from 13 countries: Czech Republic (10), Poland (9), Austria (9), France (6), United Kingdom (6), Russia (4), South Africa (4), New Zealand (3), Germany (3), Switzerland (3), Denmark (2), Sweden (2), Slovenia (1).

Most numerous airplane was Cessna 152 (31 pilots), then Cessna 150 (16) and Cessna 172 (6). There were also two Glastars and Zlin Z-43's, single Zlin Z-42, 3Xtrim, Piper PA-18, HB-23 and Van's RV-7A (the numbers of aircraft participating was lower, for some pilots flew the same aircraft).

== Results ==
=== Individual ===
#	Pilot	Country	Aircraft type	Reg. nr.	Penal points for: navigation + reconnaissance + landings = total
1.	Luboš Hájek	CZE	Cessna 152	OK-NAV	18	70	22	= 110
2.	Wacław Wieczorek	POL	Cessna 152	SP-AKP	78	40	55	= 173
3.	Robert Verbančič	SVN	Cessna 152	S5-DMI	89	40	61	= 190
4.	Michal Filip	CZE	Cessna 152	OK-IKH	60	140	27	= 227
5.	Michał Wieczorek	POL	Cessna 152	SP-KWW	157	80	17	= 254
6.	Petr Opat	CZE	Cessna 152	OK-NAV	93	160	22	= 275
7.	Michał Bartler	POL	Cessna 152	SP-KCH	96	120	68	= 284
8.	Frantisek Cihlar	CZE	Cessna 152	OK-IKC	132	140	42	= 314
9.	Janusz Darocha	POL	Cessna 152	SP-AKP	197	80	53	= 330
10.	Bolesław Radomski	POL	Cessna 152	SP-KCH	231	130	42	= 403

=== Team ===
Number of penal points and place of three best competitors:

1. Czech Republic - 612 pts
  1. Luboš Hájek - 110 pts, #1
  2. Michal Filip - 227 pts, #4
  3. Petr Opat - 275 pts, #6
2. Poland - 711 pts
  1. Wacław Wieczorek - 173 pts, #2
  2. Michał Wieczorek - 254 pts, #5
  3. Michał Bartler - 284 pts, #7
3. France - 1538 pts
  1. Patrick Bats - 429 pts, #12
  2. Eric Daspet - 505 pts, #15
  3. David Le Gentil - 604 pts, #23
4. Austria - 1849 pts
  1. Anton Tonninger, jr. - 565 pts, #18
  2. Wolfgang Schneckenreither - 596 pts, #22
  3. Paul Szameitat - 688, #28
5. Switzerland - 3348 pts
6. Germany - 3562 pts
7. United Kingdom - 3944 pts
8. Russia - 4212 pts
9. South Africa - 5125 pts
10. New Zealand - 6590 pts

== See also ==
- 17th FAI World Precision Flying Championship
- 16th FAI World Rally Flying Championship
