= 2004 Hendrick Motorsports aircraft crash =

Aviation accident in Virginia

Coordinates: 36°42′22″N 80°11′32″W

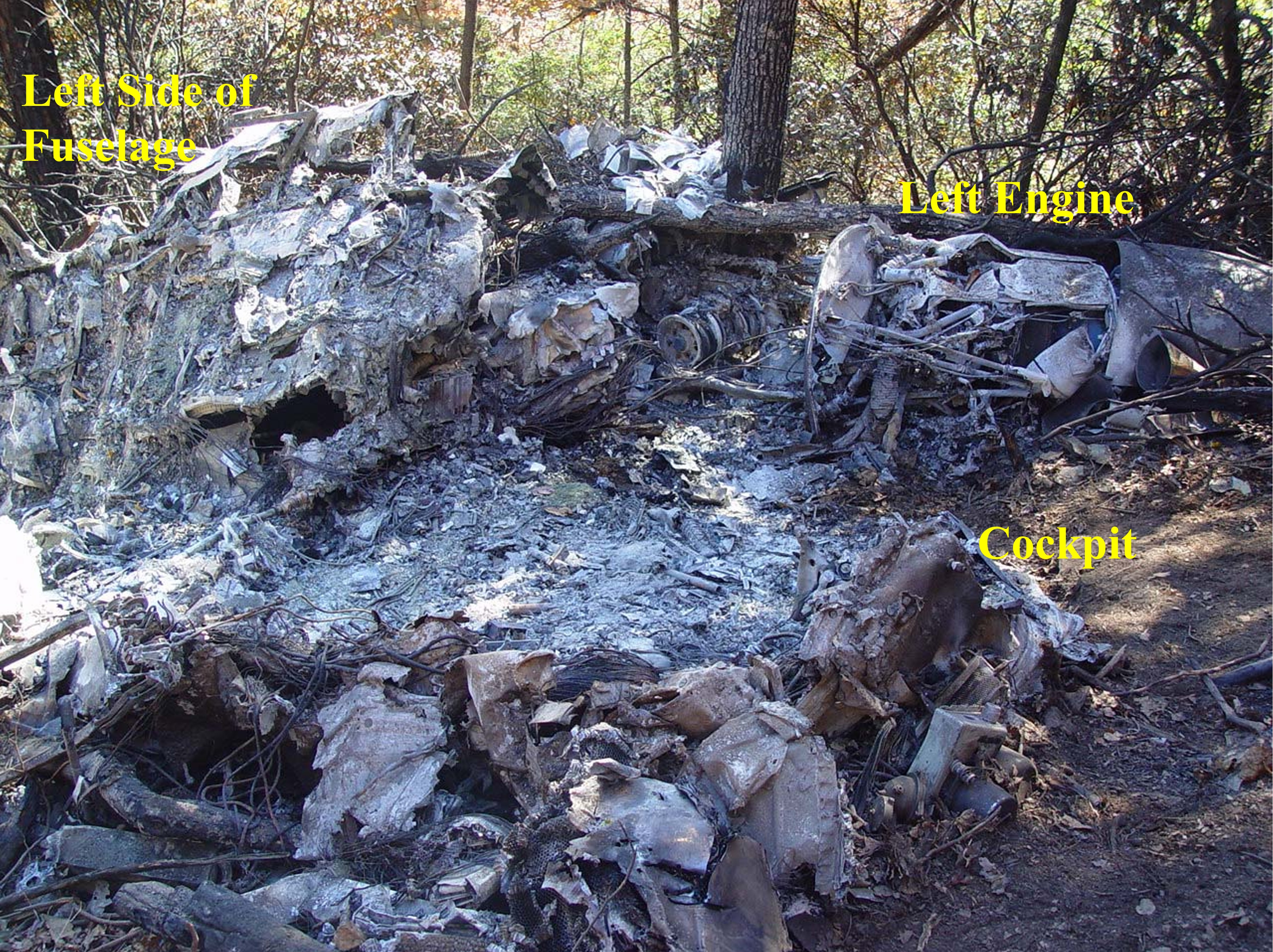
- The forward fuselage and left engine of the aircraft after the accident

Accident
- Date: October 24, 2004
- Summary: Controlled flight into terrain in inclement weather due to pilot error
- Site: Stuart, Virginia, USA

Aircraft
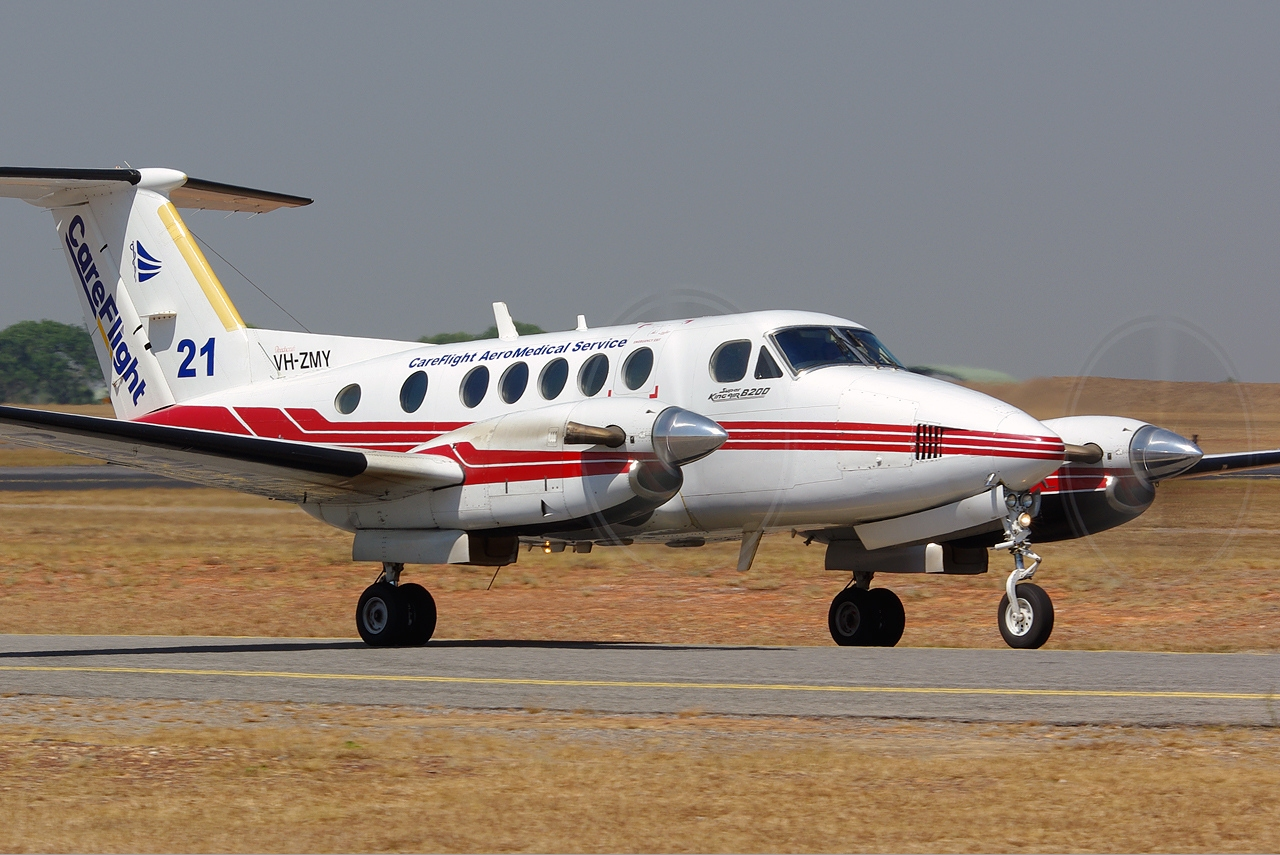
- A Beechcraft Super King Air 200, similar to the one involved in the crash
- Aircraft type: Beechcraft Super King Air 200
- Operator: Hendrick Motorsports
- Registration: N501RH
- Flight origin: Concord Regional Airport; Concord, North Carolina
- Destination: Blue Ridge Airport; Martinsville, Virginia
- Passengers: 8
- Crew: 2
- Fatalities: 10
- Survivors: 0

On October 24, 2004, a Beechcraft Super King Air 200 aircraft, registered N501RH and owned by NASCAR team Hendrick Motorsports, crashed into mountainous terrain in Stuart, Virginia, during a missed approach to Blue Ridge Airport in Martinsville, Virginia. The aircraft was transporting eight passengers and two flight crew to Martinsville so they could attend the NASCAR event at Martinsville Speedway that afternoon.

All ten people on board were killed; among them, members of the Hendrick family including John Hendrick, president of Hendrick Motorsports, his twin daughters Kimberly and Jennifer, and Ricky Hendrick, former Busch Series driver and heir to the Hendrick empire. Hendrick Motorsports staff involved includes General Manager Jeff Turner, and chief engine builder Randy Dorton. The pilots were Richard Tracy and Elizabeth Morrison. Other passengers include Joe Jackson, an executive at DuPont and Scott Lathram, Tony Stewart's pilot.

== Crash ==
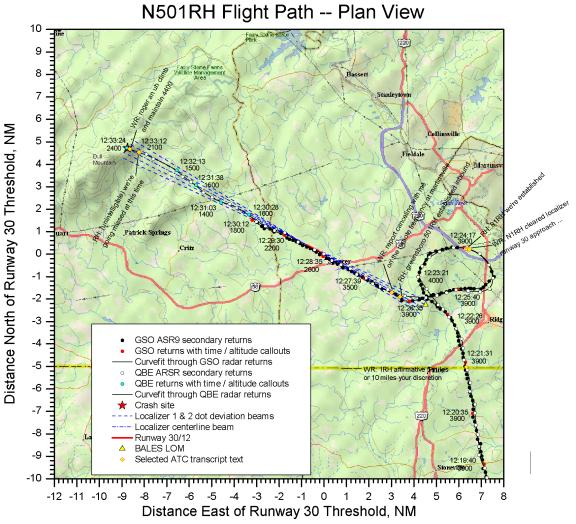
The flight path taken by the plane

The King Air took off from Concord, North Carolina, at 11:57 am EST, carrying eight passengers and two flight crew. At the time, a low level overcast system persisted throughout the region requiring the pilots to shoot the localizer 30 approach. Due to a plane landing ahead of them, the aircraft entered a hold over the initial approach fix BALES at 4,000 ft. Just as the aircraft was turning outbound on the hold, ATC cleared the pilots for the approach and to descend to 2,600 ft. The plane flew over BALES at 4,000 ft and did not begin descending until 2 nm past BALES. The aircraft then passed the MAP at 2,600 ft and reached the MDA of 1,400 ft after overflying the airport by 4 nm. 1 minute and 13 seconds later, the plane began climbing and at 12:33 pm radioed to ATC that it was going missed. 9 seconds later, the aircraft disappeared from radar.

The plane was reported missing at 3:00 pm. Eventually 9-1-1 was called, and fire trucks and police cars patrolled the Virginia area during the race itself. Around midway through the race, a Civil Air Patrol search team patrolling the nearby Bull Mountain's peak found airplane wreckage on the summit. When removing the wreckage from the summit, response teams found the bodies of the Hendrick group at 11:05 pm. Everyone on board had been killed. A search by firefighters also discovered a scar on the mountain of moved dirt; the discovery proved that the airplane crashed on the side of the mountain and the explosion blew the wreckage and group upward.

NASCAR received word of the plane crash halfway through the race at Martinsville. Jimmie Johnson, a Hendrick driver, won the race. Due to the circumstances, the usual victory lane celebration did not take place. Upon the conclusion of the race, NASCAR called all Hendrick personnel to its mobile operations trailer where details of the accident were disclosed to the team.

== Investigation ==
An investigation conducted by the National Transportation Safety Board (NTSB) followed soon after the crash.

=== Weather ===
There were foggy conditions at the time of the plane crash.

=== Pilot error as a cause ===
The NTSB suggested that pilot error was the cause of the crash, partly by:

- the plane missing its first landing attempt before veering off course and crashing;
- the plane not climbing to its temporarily assigned altitude of 2,600 feet (790 m); it instead descended to 1,800 feet (550 m) before crashing.

The NTSB concluded its investigation by suggesting that the pilots failed to execute an instrument approach procedure and that both failed to use all navigational aids to confirm the airplane's position during its approach.

== Aftermath ==
=== Impact on Hendrick Motorsports ===
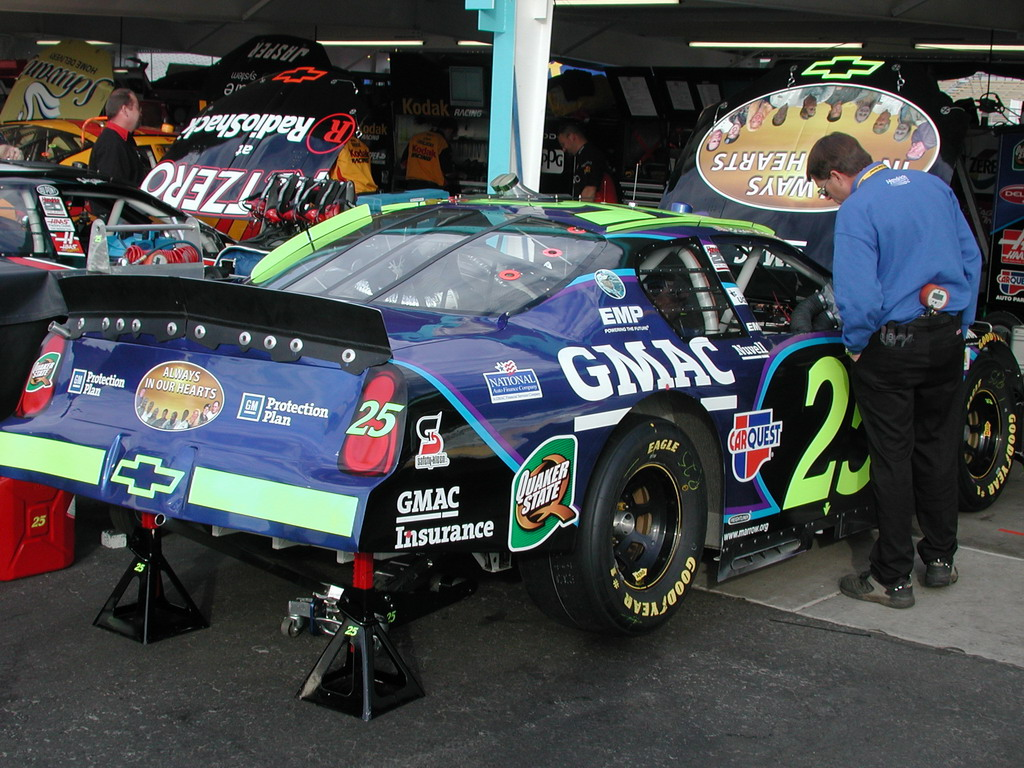
Brian Vickers' hood design pays tribute to the people killed in the plane crash

On February 18, 2005, Marshall Carlson, Rick Hendrick's son-in-law, signed on as new general manager.

=== Memorials ===
The week following the crash, officials at the Atlanta Motor Speedway held a moment of silence before both the Busch and Nextel Cup races and lowered the flags to half staff. All the Hendrick Motorsports cars, as well as the No. 0 driven by Ward Burton of Hendrick-affiliated Haas CNC Racing, carried tributes on the hoods for those who were lost the week before. Jimmie Johnson (who won the Bass Pro Shops MBNA 500 race) and the rest of his teammates and crew wore their caps backwards in victory lane as a tribute to Ricky Hendrick, who had a habit of doing the same. Teams who win in Hendrick Motorsports cars continue the tradition to honor Ricky after every race win. At the Hendrick museum in Concord, North Carolina, 300 people showed up for a candlelight vigil in honor of the ten victims.

The Randy Dorton Trophy now goes to the winner of the Mahle Engine Builders Challenge.

== See also ==
- List of accidents involving sports teams
