= 15th FAI World Rally Flying Championship =

15th FAI World Rally Flying Championship took place between July 26 – July 31, 2006 in Troyes in France, altogether with the 17th FAI World Precision Flying Championship (July 21–26).

There were 65 crews from France (8), Poland (6), Czech Republic (5), United Kingdom (5), Spain (5), Hungary (5), South Africa (5), Russia (4), Austria (3), Germany (3), Greece (3), Italy (3), Chile (3), Cyprus (2), Israel (2), Slovakia (1), Portugal (1) and 1 mixed.

Most popular airplane was Cessna 152 (31 crews) and Cessna 172 (25), then DR400 (4), Cessna 150 (3), 3Xtrim (2), PZL Wilga 2000 (2), Glastar (1), HB-23 (1), Piper PA-28-180 Cherokee (1), DV-20 (1) (these numbers of aircraft are initial, while number of participating crews was in fact lower - 65).

== Contest ==
July 15 and July 17 to July 21 - unofficial practice
July 21 to July 26 - the 17th FAI World Precision Flying Championship
July 24 to July 26 - unofficial practice
July 26 - Final arrivals, opening briefing and opening ceremony
July 27 - Official practice
July 28 - Landing test
July 29 - First competition flight
July 30 - Second First competition flight
July 31 - Reserve day, awards giving and closing ceremony
August 1 - Departures

== Results ==
=== Individual ===
Pilot / navigator / country / aircraft / registration / observation + navigation + landings penalty points = total

1.	Wacław Wieczorek / Michał Wieczorek	POL	PZL-104 Wilga 2000	SP-KPB	0 + 50 + 80 = 130
2.	Jiří Filip / Michal Filip	CZE	Cessna 152	OK-IKH	0 + 6 + 160 = 166
3.	Petr Opat / Tomas Rajdl	CZE	Cessna 152	OK-NAV	80 + 28 + 120 = 228
4.	Julien Cherioux / David Le Gentil	FRA	DR400	F-GNNS	120 + 30 + 80 = 230
5.	Philippe Odeon / Philippe Muller	FRA	Cessna 152	F-GBFB	40 + 26 + 180 = 246
6.	Janusz Darocha / Zbigniew Chrząszcz	POL	Cessna 152	SP-FZY (?)	80 + 30 + 220 = 330
7.	Krzysztof Wieczorek / Krzysztof Skrętowicz	POL	3Xtrim	SP-YUD	120 + 16 + 220 = 356
8.	Bertrand De Greef / Jean-Pierre Delmas	FRA	Cessna 152	F-GBQD	80 + 34 + 260 = 374
9.	Michel Frere / Frédérick Saquet	FRA	Cessna 152	F-GAFN	180 + 54 + 180 = 414
10.	Michał Bartler / Michał Osowski	POL	Cessna 152	SP-AKP (?)	160 + 130 + 140 = 430

=== Team ===
Two best crews were counted.

1. Czech Republic - 394 (number of penalty points)
2. Poland - 460
3. France - 476
4. Spain - 1010
5. Austria - 1700
6. United Kingdom - 1756
7. Hungary - 2226
8. Germany - 2256
9. South Africa - 2526
10. Chile - 2546
11. Greece - 3956
12. Italy - 4760
13. Russia - 4956
14. Cyprus - 8860
15. Israel - 9574
