= 2004 Bass Pro Shops MBNA 500 =

Auto race at Atlanta in 2004

Race details
- Race 33 of 36 in the 2004 NASCAR Nextel Cup Series
- Atlanta Motor Speedway (after 1997, before Atlanta International Speedway)
- Date: October 31, 2004
- Location: Atlanta Motor Speedway, Hampton, Georgia
- Course: Permanent racing facility
- Course length: 1.540 miles (2.478 km)
- Distance: 325 laps, 500.5 mi (805.5 km)
- Weather: Temperatures reaching up to 78.8 °F (26.0 °C); wind speeds up to 8.9 miles per hour (14.3 km/h)
- Average speed: 145.847 mph (234.718 km/h)

Pole position
Driver	Ryan Newman	Penske-Jasper Racing
- Time: 28.939 seconds

Most laps led
Driver	Mark Martin	Roush Racing
- Laps: 227

Winner
No. 48	Jimmie Johnson	Hendrick Motorsports

Television in the United States
- Network: NBC
- Announcers: Allen Bestwick, Benny Parsons, Wally Dallenbach Jr.
- Nielsen ratings: 4.2/10

The 2004 Bass Pro Shops MBNA 500 was a NASCAR Nextel Cup Series stock car race held on October 31, 2004 at Atlanta Motor Speedway in Hampton, Georgia. Contested over 325 laps, the race was the 33rd of the 36-race 2004 NASCAR Nextel Cup Series season. Ryan Newman of Penske-Jasper Racing won the pole, while Jimmie Johnson of Hendrick Motorsports won the race. Roush Racing teammates Mark Martin and Carl Edwards finished second and third, respectively.

This race was the Nextel Cup debut of 2017 series champion Martin Truex Jr..

== Background ==
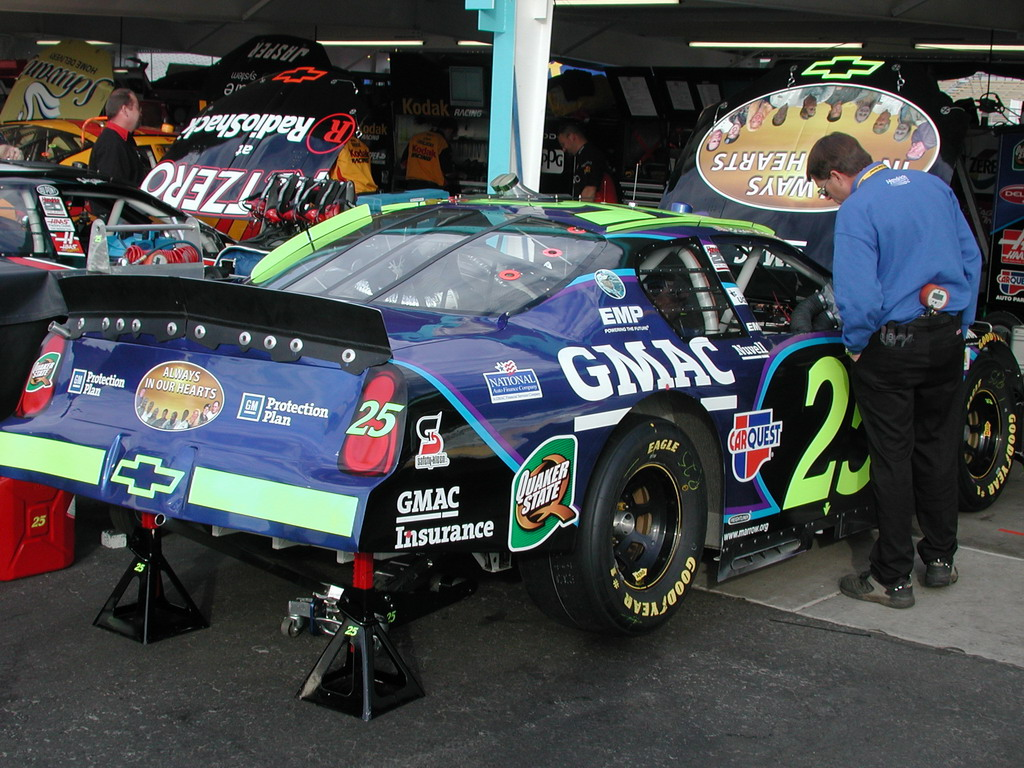
Brian Vickers' car with decals of the ten people killed in the Hendrick plane crash

Atlanta Motor Speedway was formerly a 1.522 miles (2.449 km) oval until 1997, when two doglegs were added and the track became 1.54 miles long and a quad-oval. As of the 2014 season, the track is considered one of 16 intermediate tracks on the Cup schedule.

One week after the plane crash prior to the Subway 500 that killed ten people, six of whom affiliated with Hendrick Motorsports, the four teams replaced their standard hood designs with a decal of the ten people killed.

59 cars were initially entered for the race, the most since the 1999 Daytona 500. After the preliminary list was released, J. J. Yeley, Greg Sacks, Larry Hollenbeck, and Andy Belmont entered the race, while Carl Long and Derrike Cope withdrew. Afterwards, Randy LaJoie replaced Larry Gunselman, and two days later, Cope replaced Stanton Barrett, and Mike Wallace replaced Jimmy Spencer.

=== Entry list ===
#	Driver	Team	Make
0	Ward Burton	Haas CNC Racing	Chevrolet
00	Kenny Wallace	Michael Waltrip Racing	Chevrolet
1	Martin Truex Jr.	Dale Earnhardt Inc.	Chevrolet
01	Joe Nemechek	MBV Motorsports	Chevrolet
2	Rusty Wallace	Penske-Jasper Racing	Dodge
02	Hermie Sadler	SCORE Motorsports	Chevrolet
4	Mike Wallace	Morgan–McClure Motorsports	Chevrolet
5	Terry Labonte	Hendrick Motorsports	Chevrolet
6	Mark Martin	Roush Racing	Ford
06	Travis Kvapil	Penske-Jasper Racing	Dodge
8	Dale Earnhardt Jr.	Dale Earnhardt Inc.	Chevrolet
9	Kasey Kahne (R)	Evernham Motorsports	Dodge
09	Johnny Sauter (R)	Phoenix Racing	Dodge
10	Scott Riggs (R)	MBV Motorsports	Chevrolet
11	J. J. Yeley	Joe Gibbs Racing	Chevrolet
12	Ryan Newman	Penske-Jasper Racing	Dodge
13	Greg Sacks	Sacks Motorsports	Dodge
14	John Andretti	ppc Racing	Ford
15	Michael Waltrip	Dale Earnhardt Inc.	Chevrolet
16	Greg Biffle	Roush Racing	Ford
17	Matt Kenseth	Roush Racing	Ford
18	Bobby Labonte	Joe Gibbs Racing	Chevrolet
19	Jeremy Mayfield	Evernham Motorsports	Dodge
20	Tony Stewart	Joe Gibbs Racing	Chevrolet
21	Ricky Rudd	Wood Brothers Racing	Ford
22	Scott Wimmer (R)	Bill Davis Racing	Dodge
23	Shane Hmiel	Bill Davis Racing	Dodge
24	Jeff Gordon	Hendrick Motorsports	Chevrolet
25	Brian Vickers (R)	Hendrick Motorsports	Chevrolet
29	Kevin Harvick	Richard Childress Racing	Chevrolet
30	Jeff Burton	Richard Childress Racing	Chevrolet
31	Robby Gordon	Richard Childress Racing	Chevrolet
32	Bobby Hamilton Jr.	PPI Motorsports	Chevrolet
33	Kerry Earnhardt	Richard Childress Racing	Chevrolet
37	Kevin Lepage	R&J Racing	Dodge
38	Elliott Sadler	Robert Yates Racing	Ford
40	Sterling Marlin	Chip Ganassi Racing	Dodge
41	Casey Mears	Chip Ganassi Racing	Dodge
42	Jamie McMurray	Chip Ganassi Racing	Dodge
43	Jeff Green	Petty Enterprises	Dodge
45	Kyle Petty	Petty Enterprises	Dodge
48	Jimmie Johnson	Hendrick Motorsports	Chevrolet
49	Ken Schrader	BAM Racing	Dodge
50	Todd Bodine	Arnold Motorsports	Dodge
51	Tony Raines	Competitive Edge Motorsports	Chevrolet
59	Larry Foyt	BAM Racing	Dodge
62	Larry Hollenbeck	Hollenbeck Motorsports	Chevrolet
72	Kirk Shelmerdine	Kirk Shelmerdine Racing	Ford
77	Brendan Gaughan (R)	Penske-Jasper Racing	Dodge
80	Andy Belmont	Hover Motorsports	Ford
84	Kyle Busch	Hendrick Motorsports	Chevrolet
88	Dale Jarrett	Robert Yates Racing	Ford
89	Morgan Shepherd	Shepherd Racing Ventures	Dodge
94	Derrike Cope	W.W. Motorsports	Dodge
96	Randy LaJoie	Mach 1 Motorsports	Ford
97	Kurt Busch	Roush Racing	Ford
98	Bill Elliott	Bill Elliott Racing	Dodge
99	Carl Edwards	Roush Racing	Ford

== Qualifying ==
Brendan Gaughan went out for qualifying first, and Larry Foyt was the last driver to qualify. Ryan Newman won the pole with a lap time of 28.939 seconds and speed of 191.575 miles per hour (308.310 km/h), his 26th career pole and second straight. Joe Nemechek started second, followed by Elliott Sadler, Carl Edwards, Greg Biffle, Dale Earnhardt Jr., Mark Martin, Jimmie Johnson, Kevin Harvick, and Jeff Gordon. Scott Riggs, Scott Wimmer, Kerry Earnhardt, Johnny Sauter, Hermie Sadler, Wallace, Cope, LaJoie, Sacks, Foyt, Kirk Shelmerdine, Morgan Shepherd, Belmont, Hollenbeck, and Kenny Wallace failed to qualify; Wallace never made an attempt due to a battery failure. Due in most part of Riggs and Wimmer—who made every race to that point—failing to qualify, it led to the creation of the "Top 35 Rule" in 2005 to ensure NASCAR's top-tier teams make the field.

Pos.	#	Driver	Make	Team	Time	Avg. Speed (mph)
1	12	Ryan Newman	Dodge	Penske-Jasper Racing	28.939	191.575
2	01	Joe Nemechek	Chevrolet	MBV Motorsports	28.978	191.318
3	38	Elliott Sadler	Ford	Robert Yates Racing	29.014	191.080
4	99	Carl Edwards	Ford	Roush Racing	29.028	190.988
5	16	Greg Biffle	Ford	Roush Racing	29.093	190.561
6	8	Dale Earnhardt Jr.	Chevrolet	Dale Earnhardt Inc.	29.198	189.876
7	6	Mark Martin	Ford	Roush Racing	29.219	189.740
8	48	Jimmie Johnson	Chevrolet	Hendrick Motorsports	29.256	189.500
9	29	Kevin Harvick	Chevrolet	Richard Childress Racing	29.264	189.448
10	24	Jeff Gordon	Chevrolet	Hendrick Motorsports	29.290	189.280
11	19	Jeremy Mayfield	Dodge	Evernham Motorsports	29.307	189.170
12	2	Rusty Wallace	Dodge	Penske-Jasper Racing	29.361	188.822
13	25	Brian Vickers (R)	Chevrolet	Hendrick Motorsports	29.371	188.758
14	31	Robby Gordon	Chevrolet	Richard Childress Racing	29.373	188.745
15	20	Tony Stewart	Chevrolet	Joe Gibbs Racing	29.374	188.738
16	41	Casey Mears	Dodge	Chip Ganassi Racing	29.388	188.648
17	14	John Andretti	Ford	ppc Racing	29.393	188.616
18	45	Kyle Petty	Dodge	Petty Enterprises	29.398	188.584
19	18	Bobby Labonte	Chevrolet	Joe Gibbs Racing	29.443	188.296
20	88	Dale Jarrett	Ford	Robert Yates Racing	29.456	188.213
21	30	Jeff Burton	Chevrolet	Richard Childress Racing	29.476	188.085
22	97	Kurt Busch	Ford	Roush Racing	29.533	187.722
23	37	Kevin Lepage	Dodge	R&J Racing	29.567	187.505
24	50	Todd Bodine	Dodge	Arnold Motorsports	29.581	187.418
25	77	Brendan Gaughan (R)	Dodge	Penske-Jasper Racing	29.597	187.316
26	06	Travis Kvapil	Dodge	Penske-Jasper Racing	29.651	186.975
27	32	Bobby Hamilton Jr.	Chevrolet	PPI Motorsports	29.663	186.899
28	84	Kyle Busch	Chevrolet	Hendrick Motorsports	29.682	186.780
29	42	Jamie McMurray	Dodge	Chip Ganassi Racing	29.686	186.755
30	51	Tony Raines	Chevrolet	Competitive Edge Motorsports	29.721	186.535
31	23	Shane Hmiel	Dodge	Bill Davis Racing	29.723	186.522
32	9	Kasey Kahne (R)	Dodge	Evernham Motorsports	29.728	186.491
33	1	Martin Truex Jr.	Chevrolet	Dale Earnhardt Inc.	29.735	186.447
34	0	Ward Burton	Chevrolet	Haas CNC Racing	29.750	186.353
35	43	Jeff Green	Dodge	Petty Enterprises	29.770	186.228
36	11	J. J. Yeley	Chevrolet	Joe Gibbs Racing	29.812	185.965
37	49	Ken Schrader	Dodge	BAM Racing	29.831	185.847
38	98	Bill Elliott	Dodge	Bill Elliott Racing	29.841	185.785
Provisionals
39	17	Matt Kenseth	Ford	Roush Racing	29.942	185.158
40	15	Michael Waltrip	Chevrolet	Dale Earnhardt Inc.	30.447	182.087
41	40	Sterling Marlin	Dodge	Chip Ganassi Racing	29.877	185.561
42	5	Terry Labonte	Chevrolet	Hendrick Motorsports	30.075	184.339
43	21	Ricky Rudd	Ford	Wood Brothers Racing	30.142	183.929
Failed to qualify
44	10	Scott Riggs (R)	Chevrolet	MBV Motorsports	29.941	185.164
45	22	Scott Wimmer (R)	Dodge	Bill Davis Racing	30.032	184.603
46	33	Kerry Earnhardt	Chevrolet	Richard Childress Racing	30.063	184.413
47	09	Johnny Sauter (R)	Dodge	Phoenix Racing	30.169	183.765
48	02	Hermie Sadler	Chevrolet	SCORE Motorsports	30.223	183.436
49	4	Mike Wallace	Chevrolet	Morgan–McClure Motorsports	30.225	183.424
50	94	Derrike Cope	Dodge	W.W. Motorsports	30.331	182.783
51	96	Randy LaJoie	Ford	Mach 1 Motorsports	30.437	182.147
52	13	Greg Sacks	Dodge	Sacks Motorsports	30.447	182.087
53	59	Larry Foyt	Dodge	BAM Racing	30.558	181.425
54	72	Kirk Shelmerdine	Ford	Kirk Shelmerdine Racing	30.710	180.528
55	89	Morgan Shepherd	Dodge	Shepherd Racing Ventures	31.468	176.179
56	80	Andy Belmont	Ford	Hover Motorsports	31.581	175.549
57	62	Larry Hollenbeck	Chevrolet	Hollenbeck Motorsports	32.272	171.790
58	00	Kenny Wallace	Chevrolet	Michael Waltrip Racing	0.000	0.000

== Race ==
Prior to the race, a moment of silence was held for the ten killed in the Hendrick plane crash. Rock band Third Day performed the national anthem.

Joe Nemechek took the lead on lap one, though Ryan Newman led for the next 48 laps. Carl Edwards led for four laps before losing the lead to Newman during a caution period for oil on the track; Bobby Labonte was the beneficiary, allowing him to gain back a lap. From laps 54 to 74, Newman and Edwards led 10 and 11 laps, respectively, before Mark Martin led for 41 laps. Jimmie Johnson led briefly for four laps from 116 to 119, before Martin reclaimed the lead on lap 120; 18 laps later, Bobby Labonte spun in turn 2, bringing out the second caution, and allowing Casey Mears to regain a lap. Martin would lead until lap 178, when another oil caution was called, Greg Biffle the beneficiary, with Michael Waltrip leading lap 179, before Martin reclaimed the lead. Johnson and Nemechek led laps 237 and 238-239, respectively, until Martin led for another 70 laps; during Martin's lead, another oil caution was waved on lap 287 with Jeff Burton getting a lap back, and on lap 301, Kevin Harvick stalled on pit road; Biffle was once again the beneficiary. Johnson led for two laps until lap 312, when Dale Earnhardt Jr. crashed on the backstretch after Edwards made contact with him, allowing Kasey Kahne to lead for four laps. Brian Vickers was the beneficiary of the caution. On the final restart, Johnson took the lead from Jeff Burton, and led for the remainder of the race. With 9 laps to go, things started to get crazy behind Johnson. 6 cars with those being Jeff Burton, Michael Waltrip (whose 1 lap down), Carl Edwards, Mark Martin, Joe Nemechek, and Ryan Newman began to race hard behind Johnson. The 6 drivers came off of turn 4 going 3 by 3 down the front stretch. With 8 to go off of turn 2, Jeff Burton slid up the race track in front of Ryan Newman and somehow never wrecked. Johnson beat Martin by 0.293 seconds. The win was Johnson's 13th career Cup win, seventh of 2004, first at Atlanta, and third consecutive, making him the first driver to win three straight races since Hendrick teammate Jeff Gordon in 1998–1999, and the first to do so in a season since Gordon during the 1998 season. Martin finished second, and the top five consisted of Edwards, Nemechek, and Kahne; Burton, Vickers, Jamie McMurray, Tony Stewart, and Biffle rounded out the top ten.

=== Race results ===
Fin	St	#	Driver	Make	Team	Sponsor	Laps	Led	Status	Pts	Winnings
1	8	48	Jimmie Johnson	Chevrolet	Hendrick Motorsports	Lowe's	325	17	running	185	$298,250
2	7	6	Mark Martin	Ford	Roush Racing	Viagra	325	227	running	180	$238,500
3	4	99	Carl Edwards	Ford	Roush Racing	World Financial Group	325	15	running	170	$180,117
4	2	01	Joe Nemechek	Chevrolet	MBV Motorsports	U.S. Army	325	3	running	165	$145,050
5	32	9	Kasey Kahne (R)	Dodge	Evernham Motorsports	Dodge Dealers / UAW	325	4	running	160	$137,275
6	21	30	Jeff Burton	Chevrolet	Richard Childress Racing	America Online	325	0	running	150	$110,700
7	13	25	Brian Vickers (R)	Chevrolet	Hendrick Motorsports	GMAC	325	0	running	146	$100,250
8	29	42	Jamie McMurray	Dodge	Chip Ganassi Racing	Texaco / Havoline	325	0	running	142	$99,325
9	15	20	Tony Stewart	Chevrolet	Joe Gibbs Racing	Home Depot	324	0	running	138	$130,063
10	5	16	Greg Biffle	Ford	Roush Racing	National Guard	324	0	running	134	$95,735
11	12	2	Rusty Wallace	Dodge	Penske-Jasper Racing	Miller Lite	324	0	running	130	$128,233
12	43	21	Ricky Rudd	Ford	Wood Brothers Racing	Rent-A-Center / Motorcraft	324	0	running	127	$108,456
13	16	41	Casey Mears	Dodge	Chip Ganassi Racing	Target	324	0	running	124	$98,625
14	40	15	Michael Waltrip	Chevrolet	Dale Earnhardt Inc.	NAPA Auto Parts	324	1	running	126	$113,081
15	20	88	Dale Jarrett	Ford	Robert Yates Racing	UPS	324	0	running	118	$111,742
16	14	31	Robby Gordon	Chevrolet	Richard Childress Racing	Cingular Wireless	324	0	running	115	$110,512
17	1	12	Ryan Newman	Dodge	Penske-Jasper Racing	Mobil 1 / Alltel	323	58	running	117	$138,092
18	25	77	Brendan Gaughan (R)	Dodge	Penske-Jasper Racing	Jasper Engines & Transmissions / Kodak	323	0	running	109	$85,225
19	41	40	Sterling Marlin	Dodge	Chip Ganassi Racing	Coors Light	323	0	running	106	$109,400
20	19	18	Bobby Labonte	Chevrolet	Joe Gibbs Racing	Wellbutrin XL	323	0	running	103	$119,233
21	35	43	Jeff Green	Dodge	Petty Enterprises	Bugles	322	0	running	100	$101,050
22	38	98	Bill Elliott	Dodge	Bill Elliott Racing	McDonald's	322	0	running	97	$70,700
23	37	49	Ken Schrader	Dodge	BAM Racing	Red Baron Frozen Pizza	321	0	running	94	$73,200
24	31	23	Shane Hmiel	Dodge	Bill Davis Racing	Bill Davis Racing	321	0	running	91	$73,325
25	17	14	John Andretti	Ford	ppc Racing	VB / A-Plus @ Sunoco	320	0	running	88	$69,000
26	11	19	Jeremy Mayfield	Dodge	Evernham Motorsports	Dodge Dealers / UAW	320	0	running	85	$92,000
27	36	11	J. J. Yeley	Chevrolet	Joe Gibbs Racing	MBNA	319	0	running	82	$67,400
28	23	37	Kevin Lepage	Dodge	R&J Racing	Carter's Royal Dispos-all	319	0	running	79	$66,800
29	18	45	Kyle Petty	Dodge	Petty Enterprises	Georgia-Pacific / Brawny	319	0	running	76	$80,150
30	34	0	Ward Burton	Chevrolet	Haas CNC Racing	NetZero	318	0	running	73	$69,500
31	42	5	Terry Labonte	Chevrolet	Hendrick Motorsports	Kellogg's	318	0	running	70	$93,100
32	26	06	Travis Kvapil	Dodge	Penske-Jasper Racing	Mobil 1	317	0	running	67	$66,175
33	6	8	Dale Earnhardt Jr.	Chevrolet	Dale Earnhardt Inc.	Budweiser	311	0	crash	64	$114,103
34	10	24	Jeff Gordon	Chevrolet	Hendrick Motorsports	DuPont	299	0	running	61	$113,228
35	9	29	Kevin Harvick	Chevrolet	Richard Childress Racing	GM Goodwrench	296	0	engine	58	$101,478
36	3	38	Elliott Sadler	Ford	Robert Yates Racing	M&M's	262	0	running	55	$104,883
37	33	1	Martin Truex Jr.	Chevrolet	Dale Earnhardt Inc.	Bass Pro Shops	259	0	engine	52	$65,400
38	27	32	Bobby Hamilton Jr.	Chevrolet	PPI Motorsports	Tide	225	0	running	49	$81,664
39	24	50	Todd Bodine	Dodge	Arnold Motorsports	U.S. Micro	222	0	handling	46	$65,150
40	30	51	Tony Raines	Chevrolet	Competitive Edge Motorsports	Universal Chevrolet / Marathon Oil	220	0	engine	43	$65,025
41	39	17	Matt Kenseth	Ford	Roush Racing	DeWalt	175	0	engine	40	$115,678
42	22	97	Kurt Busch	Ford	Roush Racing	Sharpie / Irwin Industrial Tools	51	0	engine	37	$84,790
43	28	84	Kyle Busch	Chevrolet	Hendrick Motorsports	Carquest	44	0	timing	34	$64,909

== Post-race ==
"The No. 6 car was coming, but I had 10 angels riding along."

— Jimmie Johnson, speaking in victory lane

Over the radio, Johnson stated, "in loving memory, all the way," and celebrated his win by driving to the flagstand to receive the checkered flag, then performing a Polish victory lap; Johnson later stated he had felt guilty for destroying one of Hendrick Director of Engine Operations Randy Dorton's (who was among those killed on the flight) engines while celebrating his first career win.

In victory lane, Hendrick competition director Ken Howes gave Johnson a cell phone with Rick Hendrick on the line. The three other Hendrick drivers (Gordon, Labonte, Vickers) joined Johnson in victory lane, and the team wore their caps backwards in honor of Hendrick's son Ricky Hendrick.

After the race, Martin, who led a race-high 227 laps, defended crew chief Pat Tryson for their late pit stop strategy, stating, "We were a sitting duck. If we pitted, they stay out and win. If we stay out, they pit. So it was nobody's fault but those caution flags." Seven of the Chase for the Nextel Cup drivers suffered problems during the race: points leader Kurt Busch suffered an engine failure on lap 52, and finished 42nd; defending Cup champion Matt Kenseth also blew an engine, finishing 41st; Elliott Sadler crashed in pit road, damaging his steering, and finished 36th; Gordon finished 34th after being forced to go into the garage for a poor-handling car; Jeremy Mayfield's tire was cut, forcing him into the wall, and finished 26th; Ryan Newman suffered from pit stop errors, and finished 17th and two laps down; finally, Dale Earnhardt Jr.'s crash on the backstretch relegated him to 33rd.

== Standings after the race ==
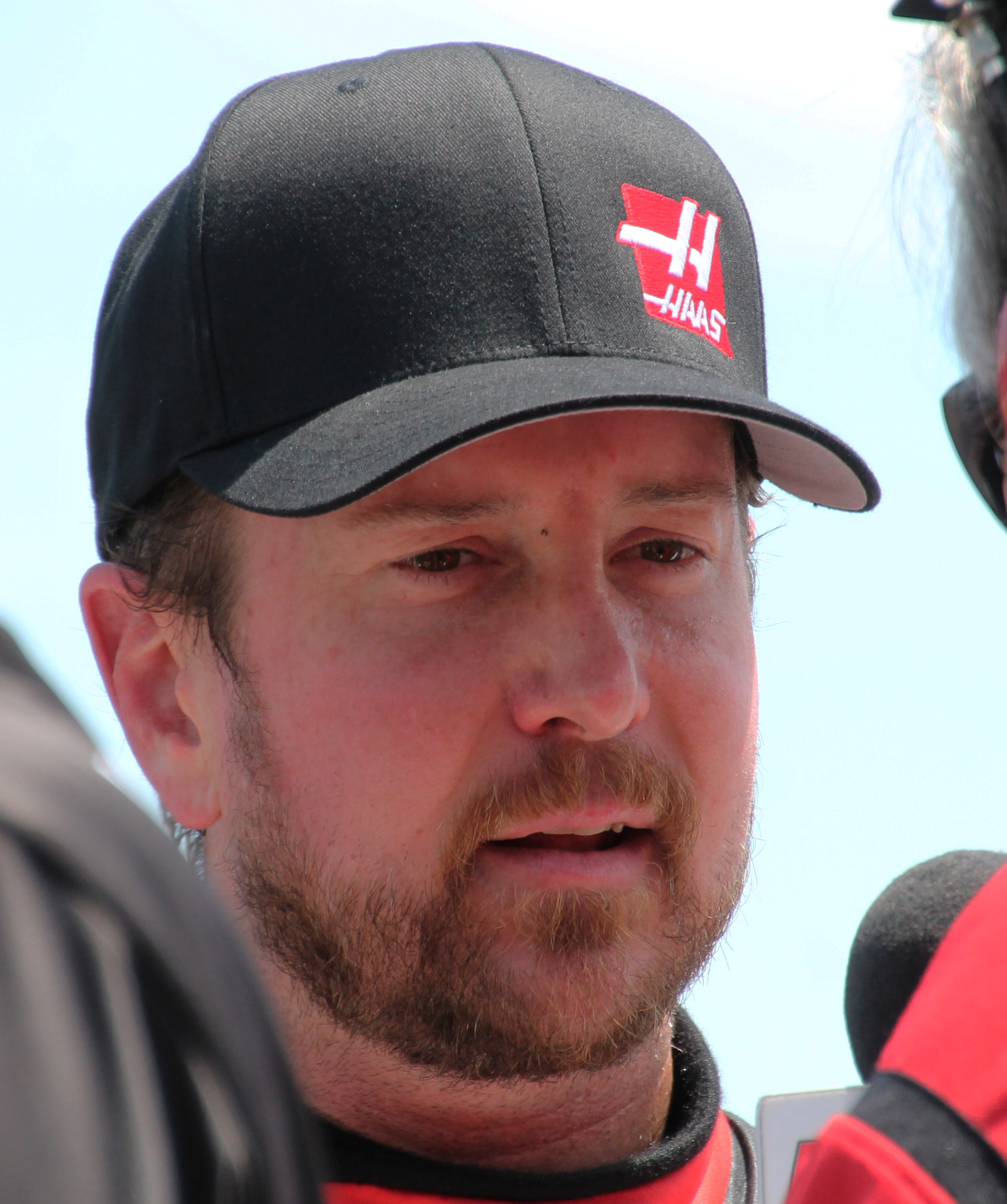
Kurt Busch (pictured in 2015) led the Chase standings after the race.

Pos	Driver	Points
1	Kurt Busch	6052
2	Jimmie Johnson	5993
3	Jeff Gordon	5980
4	Mark Martin	5971
5	Dale Earnhardt Jr.	5954
6	Tony Stewart	5907
7	Ryan Newman	5866
8	Elliott Sadler	5815
9	Matt Kenseth	5795
10	Jeremy Mayfield	5736

Previous race: 2004 Subway 500	Nextel Cup Series; 2004 season	Next race: 2004 Checker Auto Parts 500
