= 15th FAI World Precision Flying Championship =

15th FAI World Precision Flying Championship took place between July 7 - July 14, 2002 in Zagreb in Croatia.

== Uczestnicy ==
There were 54 competitors from Czech Republic (5), Poland (5), Croatia (5), South Africa (5), Austria (5), Russia (5), France (4), Slovakia (4), Germany (3), Denmark (3), Slovenia (2), United Kingdom (2), Cyprus (2), Sweden (1), Norway (1), Switzerland (1), Turkey (1).

Most popular airplane was Cessna 150 (19 pilots), then Cessna 152 (15), Cessna 172 (10), Zlin Z-43 (3), A-27M/MC (3), PZL-104M Wilga 2000 (2), PZL-104 Wilga 35 (1), Piper PA-18 (1). Numbers of aircraft participating were lower, because many pilots flew the same aircraft.

== Results ==
=== Individual ===
Place	Pilot	Country	Aircraft type	Reg. nr.	Penal points for: Observation + navigation + landings = total
1.	Luboš Hájek	CZE	Cessna 152	OK-IKF	80	43	21	= 144
2.	Janusz Darocha	POL	Cessna 152	SP-FZY	80	141	32	= 253
3.	Predrag Crnko	HRV	Cessna 150	9A-CCH	120	157	20	= 297
4.	Krzysztof Wieczorek	POL	PZL Wilga 35	SP-AGZ	165	100	47	= 312
5.	Nigel Hopkins	ZAF	Cessna 150	OE-ATN	100	217	4	= 321
6.	Jiří Filip	CZE	Cessna 152	OK-IKF	160	104	66	= 330
7.	Wacław Wieczorek	POL	PZL Wilga 2000	SP-AHV	180	84	80	= 344
8.	Želimir Trifunović	HRV	Cessna 150	9A-CCH	200	146	19	= 365
9.	Robert Verbančič	SVN	Cessna 152	S5-DMI	180	152	46	= 378
10.	Michal Filip	CZE	Zlin Z-43	OK-FOH	120	208	53	= 381

=== Team ===
Counted three best pilots (number of penal points and place)

1. Czech Republic - 855 pts
  1. Lubos Hajek - 144 pts, #1,
  2. Jiří Filip - 330 pts, #6,
  3. Michal Filip - 381 pts, #10
2. Poland - 909 pts
  1. Janusz Darocha - 253 pts, #2
  2. Krzysztof Wieczorek - 312 pts, #4,
  3. Wacław Wieczorek - 344 pts, #7
3. Croatia - 1544 pts
  1. Predrag Crnko - 297 pts, #3,
  2. Želimir Trifunović - 365 pts, #8,
  3. Andrej Bagar - 882 pts, #27
4. South Africa - 2076 pts
  1. Nigel Hopkins - 321 pts, #5
  2. Adrian Pilling - 565 pts, #15
  3. Barry De Groot - 1190 pts, #32
5. Austria - 2322 pts
6. France - 2547 pts
7. Germany - 3214 pts
8. Denmark - 5529 pts
9. Slovakia - 5673 pts
10. Russia - 7926 pts

== See also ==
- 14th FAI World Precision Flying Championship
- 16th FAI World Precision Flying Championship
