= 3Xtrim Aircraft Factory =

Polish aircraft manufacturer

- Company type: Privately held company
- Industry: Aerospace
- Founded: 1996
- Founder: Adam Kurbiel
- Defunct: 2014
- Headquarters: Bielsko-Biała, Poland
- Products: Light aircraft

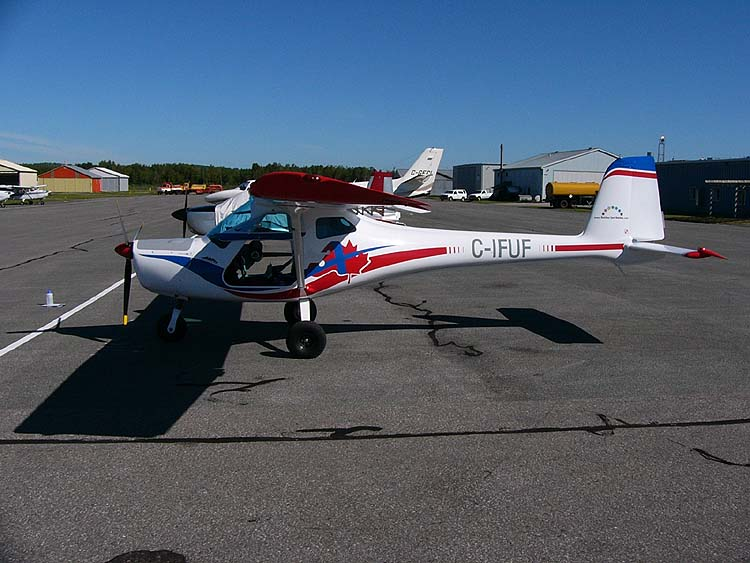
3Xtrim 3X55 Trener

The 3Xtrim Aircraft Factory, or Zakłady Lotnicze 3Xtrim Sp.z o.o.in Polish, was an aircraft manufacturer located in the city of Bielsko-Biała, in southern Poland.

The company was established by former SZD sailplane engineer Adam Kurbiel in 1996 under the name Wytwórnia i Naprawa Konstrukcji Lekkich - A. Kurbiel. The company hired many of the out-of-work aerospace workers who had been employed at the sailplane manufacturer. The company name was changed to Zakłady Lotnicze 3Xtrim Sp.z o.o. in November 1999. The company seems to have gone out of business in 2014.

3Xtrim concentrated on the design and production of the 3X55 and 3X47 ultralight aircraft, which first flew in prototype form in 1996.

The company name 3Xtrim was intended to be a double entendre, referring to the aircraft designs being "triple trimmed" (or more exactly "triple-tested") during the design, prototype and production stages and also that the aircraft are designed for "extreme conditions". In English the company name is pronounced "Three-Extreme".
