= 16th FAI World Precision Flying Championship =

16th FAI World Precision Flying Championship took place between July 19 - July 24, 2004 in Herning in Denmark, altogether with the 14th FAI World Rally Flying Championship (July 14-20).

There were 70 competitors from Poland (8), Czech Republic (8), South Africa (8), Denmark (8), Austria (6), France (5), Russia (4), United Kingdom (4), Sweden (4), Norway (4), Germany (3), Finland (3), Slovakia (2), Switzerland (2), Slovenia (1).

Most numerous airplane was Cessna 150 (27), then Cessna 152 (23), Cessna 172 (10). There were also two Glastar and Zlin Z-43's, single 3Xtrim, PZL Wilga 2000, Robin, Ikarus C42B, SAI KZ III, SOCATA Rallye.

== Contest ==
On the July 19, 2004 there was an opening ceremony, on the next day an opening briefing and official practice.

On July 21 there was the first navigation competition, in which the first two places were taken by the Poles: Krzysztof Wieczorek (6 penalty points) and Marek Kachaniak (32 pts), the third by the Czech Petr Opat (33 pts).

On July 22 there was landings competition, won by Nathalie Strube (FRA, 4 pts) and Michał Bartler (POL, 4 pts), the third was Harri Vähämaa (FIN, 12 pts), all flying Cessna 152s. Krzysztof Wieczorek remained the leader in overall classification.

On July 23 there was the last, second navigation competition, in which the first three places were taken by the Poles: Krzysztof Wieczorek (24 pts), Wacław Wieczorek (Krzysztof's brother, 35 pts) and Zbigniew Chrząszcz ex aequo with Petr Opat (CZE, 41 pts).

On July 24 there was awards giving and closing ceremony.

== Results ==
=== Individual ===
#	Pilot	Country	Aircraft type	Registration no.	Penalty points for: Observation + navigation + landings = total
1.	Krzysztof Wieczorek	POL	3Xtrim 3X55 Trener	SP-YEX	0	30	41	= 71
2.	Petr Opat	CZE	Cessna 152	OK-NAV	20	54	19	= 93
3.	Wacław Wieczorek	POL	PZL Wilga 2000	SP-AHV	20	71	17	= 108
4.	Marek Kachaniak	POL	Cessna 152	SP-KDM	20	86	16	= 122
5.	Nigel Hopkins	ZAF	Cessna 150	OY-SUP	40	105	16	= 160
6.	Michał Bartler	POL	Cessna 152	SP-FGX	60	102	4	= 166
7.	Zbigniew Chrząszcz	POL	Cessna 152	SP-KDM	20	75	76	= 171
8.	Jiří Jakeš	CZE	Cessna 152	OK-NAV	50	82	46	= 178
9.	František Cihlář	CZE	Cessna 152	OK-IKC	60	62	66	= 188
10.	Patrick Bats	FRA	Cessna 152	F-GDDM	100	36	55	= 191

=== Team ===
Number of penalty points and place of three best competitors

1. Poland - 301 pts
  1. Krzysztof Wieczorek - 71 pts, #1
  2. Wacław Wieczorek - 108 pts, #3
  3. Marek Kachaniak - 122 pts, #4
2. Czech Republic - 459 pts
  1. Petr Opat - 93 pts, #2
  2. Jiří Jakeš - 178 pts, #8
  3. František Cihlář - 188 pts, #9
3. France - 820 pts
  1. Patrick Bats - 191 pts, #10
  2. Nathalie Strube - 311 pts, #18
  3. Joël Tremblet - 318 pts, #21
4. Denmark - 1308 pts
  1. Hans Birkholm - 288 pts, #16
  2. Allan Hansen - 420 pts, #26
  3. Kurt Gabs - 600 pts, #36
5. Sweden - 1335 pts
6. Austria - 1647 pts
7. South Africa - 1929 pts
8. United Kingdom - 2314 pts
9. Norway - 2413 pts
10. Germany - 2461 pts
11. Russia - 3524 pts
12. Finland - 6482 pts

== See also ==
- 15th FAI World Precision Flying Championship
- 17th FAI World Precision Flying Championship
- 14th FAI World Rally Flying Championship
