= Randy Dorton =

American racing engine builder

- Born: Randall Alexander Dorton; May 1, 1954; Concord, North Carolina, U.S.
- Died: October 24, 2004 (aged 50); Bull Mountain, Patrick County, Virginia, U.S.
- Occupations: Director of Engine Operations, Lead engine builder
- Employer: Hendrick Motorsports

Randall Alexander Dorton (May 1, 1954 – October 24, 2004) was the Director of Engine Operations and lead engine builder for Hendrick Motorsports. With Dorton, the team won nine NASCAR championships.

On October 24, 2004, Dorton was killed in a plane crash in Patrick County, Virginia's Bull Mountain, near Martinsville Speedway in Martinsville, in which he along with seven other passengers, a number of whom associated with Hendrick Motorsports, and the two pilots were killed.

== Career ==
Born in Concord, North Carolina, Dorton began his NASCAR career in the 1970s working for crew chief Harry Hyde. In 1984, Dorton's company Competition Engines was bought out by Hendrick Motorsports, and two years later, he was named Engine Builder of the Year by NASCAR and Clevite Engine Parts. Dorton's engines helped guide the team to nine NASCAR titles (five in the Winston Cup Series, one in the Busch Series, and three in the Craftsman Truck Series). Dorton also worked with General Motors and Hendrick Motorsports in the research and development department.

== Death ==
On October 24, 2004, Dorton and nine others boarded a Beechcraft Super King Air heading to Martinsville Speedway for the Subway 500. Flying into foggy weather, the pilots became disoriented, and flew five miles past Blue Ridge Airport, and when they attempted to perform the missed approach procedure, the plane flew two miles without making the necessary right turn, and the plane crashed into Bull Mountain, killing all on board; the race would begin 27 minutes later. Hendrick driver Jimmie Johnson won the race, though no post-race celebrations were held.

In February 2006, Dorton's wife Dianne filed a lawsuit against Rick Hendrick alleging that he and his team were liable for Dorton's death, and claimed the team "showed 'conscious and intentional disregard' for Randy Dorton's safety, alleging that company president John Hendrick rejected the pilot's suggestion to divert to a different airport because of bad weather because he didn't want to be late for the race." The suits were settled in 2011, six years after the crash.

== Legacy ==
In tribute to Dorton, a 900-horsepower engine was built and used by Jimmie Johnson in a 1967 Chevrolet Camaro before being placed on display in the Hendrick Motorsports Museum.

The trophy awarded to the winner of the Mahle Engine Builders Challenge is named the Randy Dorton Trophy in his honor.

== Personal life ==
Dorton was the son of Jimmy and Lorene Dorton, he had two sons, Jonathan and Chris, and a brother, Keith.
