= 14th FAI World Rally Flying Championship =

14th FAI World Rally Flying Championship took place between July 14 - July 20, 2004 in Herning, Denmark, altogether with the 16th FAI World Precision Flying Championship (July 19-24).

There were 50 crews from Czech Republic, Poland, France, South Africa, Denmark, Russia, Germany, United Kingdom, Austria, Spain, Chile, Slovakia, Italy, Lithuania and Cyprus.

Most numerous airplane was Cessna 172 (28), then Cessna 152 (10), Cessna 150 (6). Others: PZL Wilga 2000, 3Xtrim 3X55 Trener, HB-23, Glastar and Piper PA-28 were single ones.

== Contest ==
On the July 14, 2004 there was an opening ceremony, on the next day an opening briefing and official practice.

On July 16 there was the first navigation competition, on July 17 the second competition, and on July 18 the third competition - observation test. On July 19 there was awards giving and closing ceremony (and opening ceremony of the 16th FAI World Precision Flying Championship, in which many competitors participated).

== Results ==
Individual: (pilot / navigator)

1. Jiří Filip / Michal Filip (Czech Republic) - Cessna 152 (OK-IKF) (120 penalty points)
2. František Cihlář / Milos Fiala (Czech Republic) - Cessna 152 (OK-IKC) (226 pts)
3. Krzysztof Wieczorek / Krzysztof Skrętowicz (Poland) - 3Xtrim 3X55 Trener (SP-YEX) (298 pts)
4. Nigel Hopkins / Dale de Klerk (South Africa) - Cessna 172 (OY-BIK) (318 pts)
5. Petr Opat / Tomas Rajdl (Czech Republic) - Cessna 152 (OK-NAV) (330 pts)
6. Janusz Darocha / Zbigniew Chrząszcz (Poland) - Cessna 152 (SP-FZY) (342 pts)
7. Philippe Odeon / Philippe Muller (France) - Cessna 152 (F-GBQD) (434 pts)
8. Joël Tremblet / Jose Bertanier (France) - Cessna 152 (F-GBFB) (474 pts)
9. Michel Frere / Frédérick Saquet (France) - Cessna 152 (F-GBQD) (510 pts)
10. Claes Johanssen / Nathalie Strube (FAI) - Cessna 172 (SE-CXD) (522 pts)

11. Wacław Wieczorek / Michał Wieczorek (Poland) - PZL Wilga 2000 (SP-AHV) (568 pts)

Team (penalty points):

1. Czech Republic - 346
2. Poland - 640
3. France - 908
4. South Africa - 1504
5. Austria - 2051
6. Spain - 2320
7. Denmark - 2973
8. United Kingdom - 3073
9. Germany - 3493
10. Chile - 4210
11. Italy - 4568
12. Russia - 6159
13. Cyprus - 9648
