= 2004 Subway 500 =

Race details
- Race 32 of 36 in the 2004 NASCAR Nextel Cup Series
- 2004 Subway 400 program cover
- Date: October 24, 2004
- Location: Martinsville Speedway, Martinsville, Virginia
- Course: Permanent racing facility
- Course length: .526 miles (.827 km)
- Distance: 500 laps, 263 mi (423.257 km)
- Weather: Temperatures up to 60.8 °F (16.0 °C); wind speeds up to 4.1 miles per hour (6.6 km/h)
- Average speed: 66.103 mph (106.382 km/h)

Pole position
Driver	Ryan Newman	Penske-Jasper Racing

Most laps led
Driver	Kurt Busch	Roush Racing
- Laps: 120

Winner
No. 48	Jimmie Johnson	Hendrick Motorsports

Television in the United States
- Network: NBC
- Announcers: Allen Bestwick, Benny Parsons, Wally Dallenbach Jr.
- Nielsen ratings: 4.4/10

The 2004 Subway 500 was a NASCAR Nextel Cup Series stock car race held on October 24, 2004 at Martinsville Speedway in Martinsville, Virginia. Contested over 500 laps, the race was the 32nd of the 36-race 2004 NASCAR Nextel Cup Series season, and the sixth race in the 2004 Chase for the Nextel Cup.

Pole position was won by Penske-Jasper Racing's Ryan Newman, while Jimmie Johnson of Hendrick Motorsports won the race. Chip Ganassi Racing's Jamie McMurray and Newman finished second and third, respectively.

== Background ==
Martinsville Speedway, considered the "Paperclip" for its paper clip shape, is the shortest track on the Cup circuit at only 0.526 miles (0.847 km) long. The track's banking is 12 degrees, while the straightaways were flat.

Entering the race, Kurt Busch led the points standings with 5850 points. Dale Earnhardt Jr. (5826), Jeff Gordon (5776), Elliott Sadler (5693), and Mark Martin (5664) comprised the top five, while Tony Stewart (5646), Matt Kenseth (5635), Jimmie Johnson (5623), Ryan Newman (5579), and Jeremy Mayfield (5501) rounded out the Chase field.

=== Hendrick Motorsports plane crash ===
Before the race, a Beechcraft Super King Air carrying ten people, seven of whom were Hendrick Motorsports personnel, including John Hendrick, Rick Hendrick's brother, and his two daughters Kimberly and Jennifer; Ricky Hendrick, Rick's son and former driver; Jeff Turner, Hendrick Motorsports' general manager; Randy Dorton, Hendrick's Director of Engine Operations; Joe Jackson, an executive for Jeff Gordon's sponsor DuPont; along with Scott Lathram, a pilot for Tony Stewart, and pilots Richard Tracy and Elizabeth Morrison, crashed into nearby Bull Mountain, killing all on board. The crash occurred 27 minutes before the race began.

== Qualifying ==
51 cars entered the race, ten of whom had attempted less than 20 races in 2004: Ryan McGlynn (#00), Greg Sacks (#13), Kevin Lepage (#37), Carl Long (#46), Tony Raines (#51), Klaus Graf (#59), Mike Garvey (#75), Mario Gosselin (#80), Brad Teague (#94), and Chad Chaffin (#98). Travis Kvapil (#06) was later added to the list, while Raines was removed.

Qualifying was held on October 22, and was postponed by 30 minutes due to rain. Ricky Rudd led the Friday practice with a lap speed of 96.293 mph (154.969 km/h), faster than the previous track record.

In qualifying, Ryan Newman won the pole with a lap time of 19.513 seconds and a speed of 97.043 mph (156.176 km/h), more than 3/10th's faster than the previous record of 95.371 mph (153.485 km/h) set by Tony Stewart in 2000. for his 25th career pole. Newman's teammate Rusty Wallace qualified second with a lap speed of 96.234 mph (154.874 km/h), followed by Dale Earnhardt Jr. (96.205 mph (154.827 km/h)), Ward Burton (96.107 mph (154.669 km/h)), Kvapil (96.102 mph (154.661 km/h)), Scott Riggs (96.063 mph (154.598 km/h)), Kurt Busch (96.039 mph (154.560 km/h)), Jamie McMurray (96.039 mph (154.560 km/h)), Rudd (95.772 mph (154.130 km/h)), and Jeff Green (95.743 mph (154.083 km/h)) rounded out the top ten. The top 17 drivers broke the previous record. Jimmy Spencer (92.124 mph (148.259 km/h)), Todd Bodine (92.769 mph (149.297 km/h)), Kirk Shelmerdine (87.968 mph (141.571 km/h)), Gosselin (92.710 mph (149.202 km/h)), and Lepage (92.556 mph (148.954 km/h)) were forced to use provisionals. Graf (93.687 mph (150.775 km/h)), Garvey (93.478 mph (150.438 km/h)), Morgan Shepherd (92.159 mph (148.316 km/h)), McGlynn (91.624 mph (147.455 km/h)), Sacks (91.416 mph (147.120 km/h)), and Teague (90.503 mph (145.650 km/h)) failed to qualify. Long withdrew from qualifying and did not set a time. Lepage and Shelmerdine were forced to move to the rear of the field for engine changes.

=== Full qualifying results ===
1. Ryan Newman #12 ALLTEL Dodge Penske Racing 97.043 mph

2. Rusty Wallace #2 Miller Lite Dodge Penske Racing 96.234 mph

3. Dale Earnhardt Jr. #8 Budweiser Chevrolet Dale Earnhardt Incorporated 96.205 mph

4. Ward Burton # 0 Netzero HiSpeed Chevrolet Haas CNC Racing 96.107 mph

5. Travis Kvapil #06 Mobil 1/Jasper Engines Dodge Penske Racing 96.102 mph

6. Scott Riggs * #10 Valvoline Chevrolet MBV Motorsports 96.063 mph

7. Kurt Busch #97 Sharpie/IRWIN Ford Roush Racing 96.039 mph

8. Jamie McMurray #42 Texaco Havoline Dodge Chip Ganassi Racing 96.039 mph

9. Ricky Rudd #21 Motorcraft/US Air Force Ford Wood Brothers Racing 95.772 mph

10. Jeff Green #43 Cheerios/Betty Crocker Dodge Petty Enterprises 95.743 mph

11. Jeremy Mayfield #19 Dodge Dealers/UAW Dodge Evernham Motorsports 95.738 mph

12. Jeff Burton # 30 America Online Chevrolet Richard Childress Racing 95.670 mph

13. Tony Stewart #20 Home Depot Chevrolet Joe Gibbs Racing95.665 mph

14. Brendan Gaughan * #77 Kodak/Jasper Engines Dodge Penske/Jasper Racing 95.656 mph

15. Jeff Gordon #24 Dupont Chevrolet Hendrick Motorsports 95.651 mph

16. Sterling Marlin #40 Coors Light Dodge Chip Ganassi Racing 95.622 mph

17. Bobby Labonte #18 Interstate Batteries Chevrolet Joe Gibbs Racing 95.549 mph

18. Jimmie Johnson #48 Lowe's Chevrolet Hendrick Motorsports 95.304 mph

19. Kevin Harvick #29 GM Goodwrench Chevrolet Richard Childress Racing 95.218 mph

20. Ken Schrader #49 Schwan's Home Service Dodge BAM Racing 95.127 mph

21. Greg Biffle #16 National Guard/Subway Ford Roush Racing 95.098 mph

22. Carl Edwards #99 Roush Racing Ford Roush Racing 94.912 mph

23. Mark Martin # 6 Viagra Ford Roush Racing 94.799 mph

24. Scott Wimmer * #22 Caterpillar Dodge Bill Davis Racing 94.784 mph

25. Matt Kenseth #17 DeWalt Ford Roush Racing 94.770 mph

26. Kyle Petty #45 Georgia Pacific/Brawny Dodge Petty Enterprises 94.756 mph

27. Terry Labonte #5 Kellogg's Chevrolet Hendrick Motorsports 94.746 mph

28. Casey Mears #41 Target/Breast Cancer Research Foundation Dodge Chip Ganassi Racing 94.732 mph

29. Joe Nemechek #01 US Army Chevrolet MB2 Motorsports 94.689 mph

30. Michael Waltrip #15 NAPA Auto Parts Chevrolet Dale Earnhardt Incorporated 94.618 mph

31. Hermie Sadler #02 SCORE Motorsports Chevrolet Angela Sadler 94.604 mph

32. Dale Jarrett #88 UPS Ford Robert Yates Racing 94.534 mph

33. Elliott Sadler #38 M&M's Ford Robert Yates Racing 94.444 mph

34. Brian Vickers * #25 GMAC Financial Services Chevrolet Hendrick Motorsports 94.289 mph

35. Bobby Hamilton Jr #32 Tide Chevrolet PPI Motorsports 94.040 mph

36. Robby Gordon #31 Cingular Wireless Chevrolet Richard Childress Racing 93.975 mph

37. Chad Chaffin #98 Mach One Inc Ford William Edwards 93.956 mph

38. Kasey Kahne *#9 Dodge Dealers/UAW Dodge Evernham Motorsports 93.761 mph

39. Jimmy Spencer #4 Lucas Oil Products Chevrolet Morgan-McClure Racing 92.124 mph (provisional)

40. Todd Bodine #50 Arnold Development Companies Dodge Arnold Racing 92.769 mph (provisional)

41. Kirk Shelmerdine #72 Vote for Bush Ford Kirk Shelmerdine 87.968 mph (provisional)

42. Morgan Shepherd #89 Racing With Jesus/Red Line Oil Dodge Cindy Shepherd 92.159 mph (provisional)

43. Kevin Lepage #37 Carter's Royal Dispos-all Dodge John Carter 92.556 mph (provisional)

Did not qualify

44. Klaus Graf #59 BAM Racing Dodge BAM Racing 93.687 mph

45. Mike Garvey #75 Jani-King Dodge Randall Haefelle 93.474 mph

46. Mario Gosselin #80 Hover Motorsports Ford Hover Motorsports 92.710 mph

47. Ryan McGlynn #00 Buyers Choice Auto Warranties Chevrolet Raynard McGlynn 91.624 mph

48. Greg Sacks #13 ARC Dehooker/Vita Coco Dodge James Wilsberg 91.416 mph

49. Brad Teague #94 WW Motorsports Ford David Watson 90.503 mph

50. Carl Long #46 RacingMetal.com Dodge Glenn Motorsport no time

== Race ==
Ryan Newman led the first nine laps of the race, with Rusty Wallace claiming the lead on lap 10, leading for 33 laps. Terry Labonte then led the next eight laps, with Kasey Kahne leading for 17 laps before Labonte took the lead back. Tony Stewart took the lead on lap 90, losing it on lap 108 to Kurt Busch, who led for only the lap before Sterling Marlin took over, leading until Busch reclaimed it on lap 131. Busch would lead for 54 laps, with Matt Kenseth briefly leading for a lap before Busch led the longest streak with 64 laps. Kevin Harvick, Wallace, and Kenseth would split the lead for the next 45 laps, Harvick leading 43 of them, followed by leading another 61 after taking the lead back from Kenseth on lap 295. After Busch led lap 356, Jamie McMurray took the lead, leading for 20 laps until Jeff Gordon led for six laps from lap 377 to 382 before McMurray reclaimed it. Jimmie Johnson then led his first laps of the race on lap 405, relinquishing it on lap 410. McMurray (1) and Marlin (29) led the next 30 laps until Johnson took the lead on lap 440, leading for the remainder of the race. McMurray, Newman, Marlin, and Busch finished in the top five, while the top ten consisted of Jeremy Mayfield, Jeff Green, Harvick, Jeff Gordon, and Rusty Wallace.

17 cautions occurred during the race. The first was on lap 4, when Joe Nemechek and Todd Bodine crashed in turn 2. On lap 14, Brendan Gaughan, Marlin, and Mayfield were involved in an accident in turn 4, with Jimmy Spencer becoming the beneficiary and gain back a lap. On lap 21, Rudd spun out in turn 2, allowing Shelmerdine to gain back a spot. On lap 66, Robby Gordon crashed in turn 4, allowing Mario Gosselin to be the beneficiary. On lap 77, Rudd and Robby Gordon crashed in turn 4, Shelmerdine gaining another lap back. On lap 107, Dale Jarrett, Casey Mears, Bobby Hamilton Jr., and Kirk Shelmerdine crashed in turn 3, allowing Robby Gordon to regain a lap. On lap 184, Kyle Petty spun in turn 2, permitting Nemechek to gain back a lap. On lap 292, Carl Edwards spun in turn 2, with Jeff Gordon being the beneficiary. The first caution for debris was flown on lap 322, with Robby Gordon becoming the beneficiary. Bobby Labonte, Jeff Green, and Ken Schrader crashed in turn 4 on lap 355, Rudd winning a lap back. Ward Burton spun in turn 2 on lap 372, though there was no beneficiary. On lap 410, Jarrett spun out in turn 3, with Petty gaining a lap back. The second debris caution flew on lap 418, Travis Kvapil being the beneficiary. On lap 451, Elliott Sadler spun out in turn 4, Burton gaining back a lap. Dale Earnhardt Jr. and Petty crashed in turn 2 on lap 468, with Sadler getting a lap back. However, on lap 477, Sadler would be involved in a crash in turn 2 with Nemechek, allowing Scott Riggs to gain back a lap. The final caution occurred on lap 490, with Edwards and Robby Gordon crashing in turn 3, with Kvapil being the beneficiary again.

Due to the Hendrick Motorsports plane crash, victory lane celebrations were not held, and the grandfather clock often given to the race winner was delivered after the season ended.

== Results ==
POS	ST	#	DRIVER	SPONSOR / OWNER	CAR	LAPS	MONEY	STATUS	LED	PTS
1	18	48	Jimmie Johnson	Lowe's (Rick Hendrick)	Chevrolet	500	157440	running	67	185
2	8	42	Jamie McMurray	Texaco / Havoline (Chip Ganassi)	Dodge	500	104025	running	43	175
3	1	12	Ryan Newman	Alltel (Roger Penske)	Dodge	500	132517	running	9	170
4	16	40	Sterling Marlin	Coors Light (Chip Ganassi)	Dodge	500	113545	running	50	165
5	7	97	Kurt Busch	Irwin Industrial Tools / Sharpie (Jack Roush)	Ford	500	107175	running	120	165
6	11	19	Jeremy Mayfield	Dodge Dealers / UAW (Ray Evernham)	Dodge	500	95350	running	0	150
7	10	43	Jeff Green	Cheerios / Betty Crocker (Petty Enterprises)	Dodge	500	93600	running	0	146
8	19	29	Kevin Harvick	GM Goodwrench (Richard Childress)	Chevrolet	500	101903	running	104	147
9	15	24	Jeff Gordon	DuPont (Rick Hendrick)	Chevrolet	500	107853	running	6	143
10	2	2	Rusty Wallace	Miller Lite (Roger Penske)	Dodge	500	106308	running	34	139
11	12	30	Jeff Burton	America Online (Richard Childress)	Chevrolet	500	73175	running	0	130
12	23	6	Mark Martin	Viagra (Jack Roush)	Ford	500	70550	running	0	127
13	38	9	Kasey Kahne	Dodge Dealers / UAW (Ray Evernham)	Dodge	500	99350	running	17	129
14	9	21	Ricky Rudd	Motorcraft / U.S. Air Force (Wood Brothers)	Ford	500	87681	running	0	121
15	13	20	Tony Stewart	Home Depot (Joe Gibbs)	Chevrolet	500	105903	running	18	123
16	25	17	Matt Kenseth	DeWalt Power Tools (Jack Roush)	Ford	500	108203	running	2	120
17	21	16	Greg Biffle	National Guard / Subway (Jack Roush)	Ford	500	68925	running	0	112
18	17	18	Bobby Labonte	Interstate Batteries (Joe Gibbs)	Chevrolet	500	101813	running	0	109
19	30	15	Michael Waltrip	NAPA (Dale Earnhardt, Inc.)	Chevrolet	500	92131	running	0	106
20	24	22	Scott Wimmer	Caterpillar (Bill Davis)	Dodge	500	84425	running	0	103
21	5	06	Travis Kvapil	Mobil 1 / Jasper Engines (Roger Penske)	Dodge	500	55975	running	0	100
22	26	45	Kyle Petty	Georgia-Pacific / Brawny (Petty Enterprises)	Dodge	500	72025	running	0	97
23	36	31	Robby Gordon	Cingular Wireless (Richard Childress)	Chevrolet	500	91487	running	0	94
24	22	99	Carl Edwards	Roush Racing (Jack Roush)	Ford	500	92042	running	0	91
25	27	5	Terry Labonte	Kellogg's (Rick Hendrick)	Chevrolet	500	85500	running	30	93
26	6	10	Scott Riggs	Valvoline (James Rocco)	Chevrolet	500	83287	running	0	85
27	34	25	Brian Vickers	GMAC Financial Services (Rick Hendrick)	Chevrolet	498	65835	running	0	82
28	4	0	Ward Burton	NetZero (Gene Haas)	Chevrolet	497	58085	running	0	79
29	28	41	Casey Mears	Target / Breast Cancer Research (Chip Ganassi)	Dodge	496	67950	running	0	76
30	29	01	Joe Nemechek	U.S. Army (Nelson Bowers)	Chevrolet	488	73764	running	0	73
31	20	49	Ken Schrader	Schwan's Home Service (Beth Ann Morgenthau)	Dodge	484	54275	running	0	70
32	33	38	Elliott Sadler	M&M's (Yates Racing)	Ford	475	93033	crash	0	67
33	3	8	Dale Earnhardt Jr.	Budweiser (Dale Earnhardt, Inc.)	Chevrolet	449	103173	crash	0	64
34	14	77	Brendan Gaughan	Kodak / Jasper Engines (Doug Bawel)	Dodge	424	62020	running	0	61
35	39	4	Jimmy Spencer	Lucas Oil Products (Larry McClure)	Chevrolet	421	53975	running	0	58
36	35	32	Bobby Hamilton Jr.	Tide (Cal Wells)	Chevrolet	404	61925	crash	0	55
37	32	88	Dale Jarrett	UPS (Yates Racing)	Ford	403	84792	running	0	52
38	31	02	Hermie Sadler	SCORE Motorsports (Hermie Sadler)	Chevrolet	159	53825	electrical	0	49
39	37	98	Chad Chaffin	Mach One Inc. (William Edwards)	Ford	100	53765	rear end	0	46
40	41	72	Kirk Shelmerdine	Vote for Bush (Kirk Shelmerdine)	Ford	86	53690	engine	0	43
41	42	80	Mario Gosselin	Hover Motorsports (Stan Hover)	Ford	74	53640	suspension	0	40
42	43	37	Kevin Lepage	Carter's Royal Dispos-All (John Carter)	Dodge	11	53590	vibration	0	37
43	40	50	Todd Bodine	Arnold Development Companies (Don Arnold)	Dodge	1	52891	crash	0	34
Failed to qualify or withdrew
POS	NAME	NBR	SPONSOR	OWNER	CAR					
44	Klaus Graf	59	DHL	Beth Ann Morgenthau	Dodge					
45	Mike Garvey	75	Jani-King	Randall Haefele	Dodge					
46	Morgan Shepherd	89	Racing With Jesus / Red Line Oil	Morgan Shepherd	Dodge					
47	Ryan McGlynn	00	Buyer's Choice Auto Warranties	Raynard McGlynn	Chevrolet					
48	Greg Sacks	13	ARC Dehooker / Vita Coco	James Wilsberg	Dodge					
49	Brad Teague	94	W.W. Motorsports	David Watson	Ford					
50	Carl Long	46	RacingMetal.com	Rick Glenn	Dodge					
WD	Tony Raines	51	Marathon / Chase	Joe Auer	Chevrolet					

== Standings after the race ==
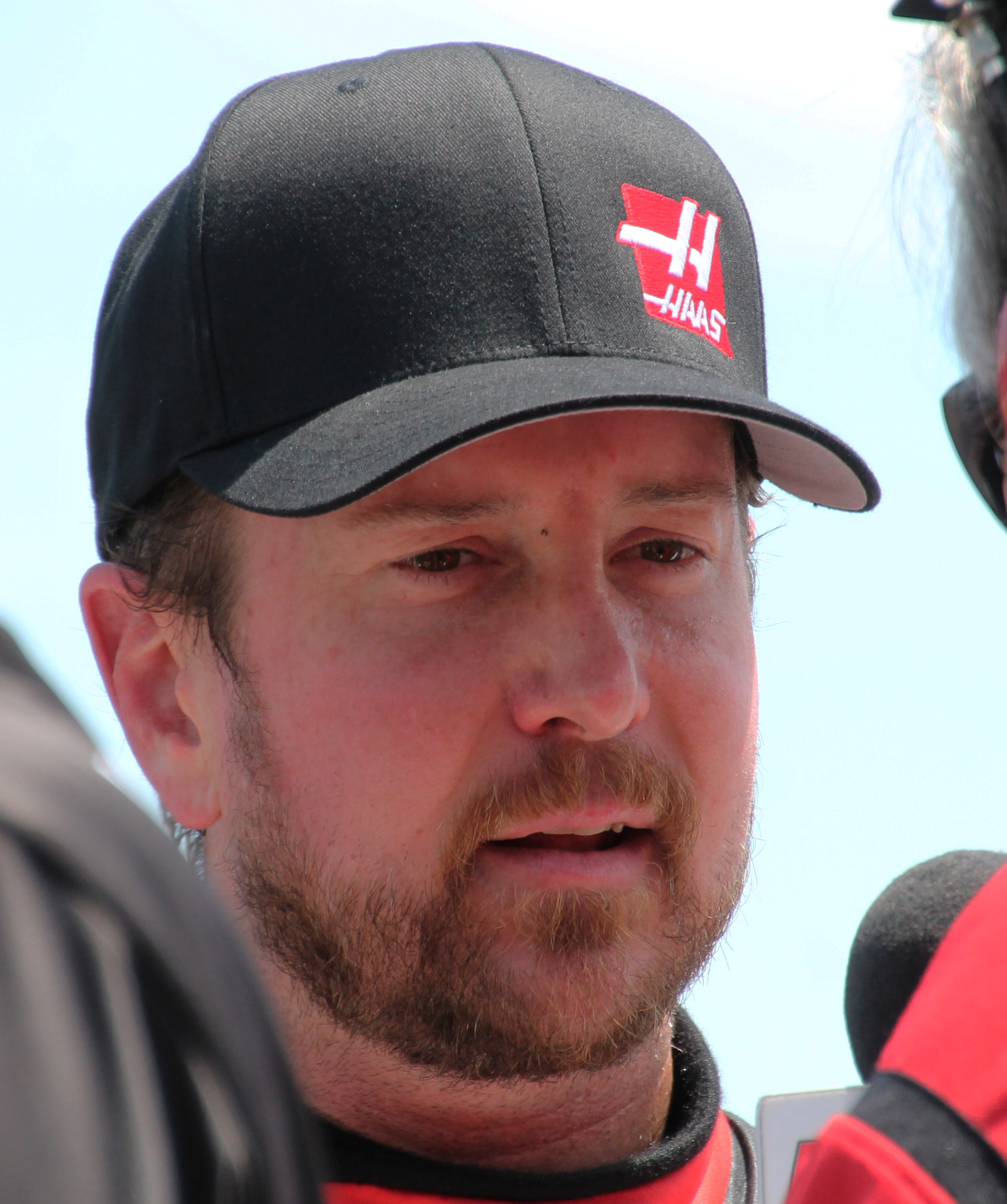
Kurt Busch (pictured in 2015) led the Chase standings after the race.

Pos	Driver	Points
1	Kurt Busch	6015
2	Jeff Gordon	5919
3	Dale Earnhardt Jr.	5890
4	Jimmie Johnson	5808
5	Mark Martin	5791
6	Tony Stewart	5769
7	Elliott Sadler	5760
8	Matt Kenseth	5755
9	Ryan Newman	5749
10	Jeremy Mayfield	5651

Previous race: 2004 UAW-GM Quality 500	Nextel Cup Series; 2004 season	Next race: 2004 Bass Pro Shops MBNA 500
