= Agence Nationale de l'Aviation Civile du Bénin =

Civil aviation authority of Benin

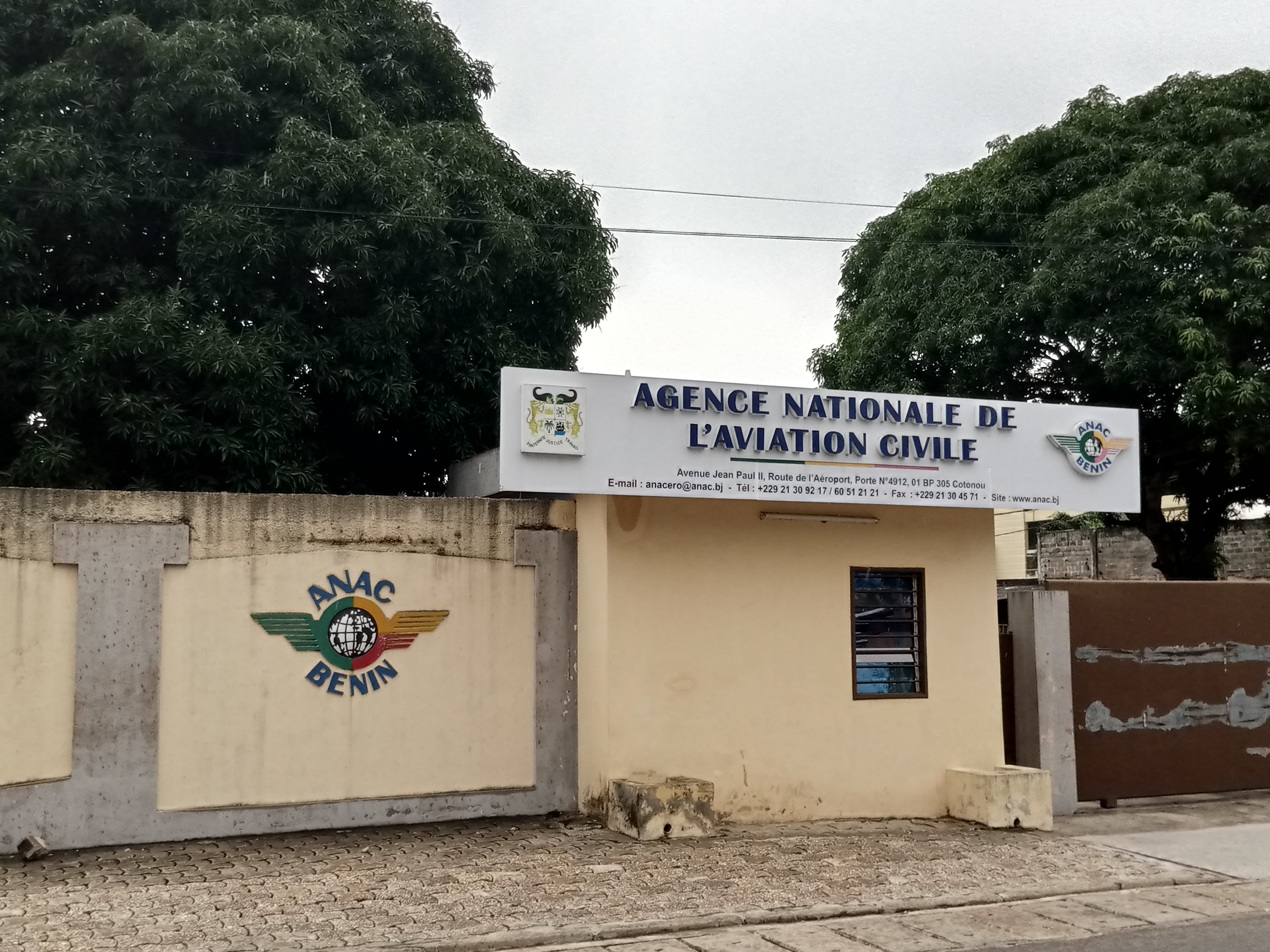
Agence Nationale de l'Aviation Civile office front

The Agence Nationale de l'Aviation Civile du Bénin (ANAC BENIN), in English the Benin National Civil Aviation Agency, is the civil aviation authority of Benin. The agency has its head office in Cotonou.

ANAC Benin was created by decree N°2004-598 of 29 October 2004, replacing the Direction de l'Aviation Civil (Directorate of Civil Aviation).
