= 17th FAI World Precision Flying Championship =

17th FAI World Precision Flying Championship took place between July 21–26, 2006 in Troyes in France, altogether with the 15th FAI World Rally Flying Championship (July 26–31).

There were 61 competitors from Poland (8), Czech Republic (8), France (7), South Africa (7), Austria (6), United Kingdom (4), Russia (4), Sweden (3), Finland (3), Denmark (2), Norway (2), Switzerland (2), Lithuania (2), Germany (1), Slovenia (1), Cyprus (1).

Most popular airplane was Cessna 152 (30 crews), then Cessna 150 (18), Cessna 172 (6), 3Xtrim (2). There were also single pilots flying Glastar, PZL Wilga 2000, Piper J-3, MS-880 and HB-23.

== Contest ==
July 15 and July 17 to July 21 - unofficial practice
July 21 - Final arrivals, opening briefing
July 22 - Landing practice and opening ceremony
July 23 - Landing test
July 24 - First navigation test
July 25 - Second navigation test
July 26 - Reserve day, awards giving and closing ceremony
July 27 - Departures

On July 23 there was a landing competition, in which the first place was taken by Ron Stirk (South Africa, C152, 2 penalty points), the second and third by Anton Tonninger (Austria, C152, 4 pts) and Burkard Ryska (Germany, C152, 4 pts).

In the first navigation test on July 24, the first place was taken by Krzysztof Wieczorek (Poland, 113 pts), the second by Petr Opat (Czech, 126 pts), the third by Wacław Wieczorek (Poland, 139 pts - Krzysztof's brother, flying PZL-104 Wilga 2000).

On July 25 there was the last, second navigation competition, in which the first two places were taken by the Poles: Janusz Darocha (53 pts) and Wacław Wieczorek (78 pts), then Jiri Filip (Czech, 95 pts).

The first three places were taken by the Poles, the next by the Czechs, including Jiří and Michel Filip brothers on the 4th and 5th place.

== Results ==
Individual:

Competitor / country / aircraft / registration / 1st + 2nd + 3rd test penalty points = total

1.	Krzysztof Wieczorek	POL	3Xtrim 3X55 Trener	SP-YUD	16 + 113 + 95 = 224
2.	Janusz Darocha	POL	Cessna 152	SP-FZY	20 + 189 + 53 = 262
3.	Krzysztof Skrętowicz	POL	3Xtrim	SP-YUD	22 + 143 + 116 = 281
4.	Jiří Filip	CZE	Cessna 152	OK-IKH	16 + 174 + 95 = 285
5.	Michal Filip	CZE	Cessna 152	OK-IKH	54 + 153 + 98 = 305
6.	Petr Opat	CZE	Cessna 152	OK-NAV	58 + 126 + 156 = 340
7.	Johan Nylen	SWE	Cessna 150	SE-ETN	32 + 162 + 168 = 362
8.	Michał Bartler	POL	Cessna 152	SP-AKO	32 + 204 + 132 = 368
9.	Marek Kachaniak	POL	Cessna 152	SP-AKO	46 + 150 + 177 = 373
10.	Nathalie Strube	FRA	Cessna 152	F-GPRT	76 + 195 + 118 = 389

Team:

1. Poland - 767 pts (Krzysztof Wieczorek 224 pts, Janusz Darocha 262 pts, Krzysztof Skrętowicz 281 pts)
2. Czech Republic - 930 pts (Jiří Filip 285 pts, Michal Filip 305 pts, Petr Opat 340 pts)
3. France - 1268 pts (Nathalie Strube 389 pts, Eric Daspet 403 pts #11, Patrick Bats 476 pts #15)
4. South Africa - 2598 pts
5. Austria - 2878 pts
6. United Kingdom - 3133 pts
7. Finland - 4629 pts
8. Sweden - 6272 pts
9. Russia- 6978 pts
