= Blue Ridge Airport =

Blue Ridge Regional Airport
- IATA: none; ICAO: KMTV; FAA LID: MTV

Summary
- Airport type: Public
- Owner: Blue Ridge Airport Authority
- Serves: Martinsville, Virginia
- Elevation AMSL: 941 ft / 287 m
- Coordinates: 36°37′51″N 080°01′06″W
- Website: www.FlyBlueRidge.com
- Interactive map of Blue Ridge Regional Airport

Runways
Direction	Length		Surface
Direction	ft	m	Surface
13/31	5,002	1,525	Asphalt

Statistics (2017)
- Aircraft operations: 23,500
- Based aircraft: 20
- Source: Federal Aviation Administration

Blue Ridge Regional Airport (ICAO: KMTV, FAA LID: MTV) is nine miles southwest of Martinsville, in Henry County, Virginia. It is owned by the Blue Ridge Airport Authority. The FAA's National Plan of Integrated Airport Systems for 2009–2013 categorized it as a general aviation facility.

Many U.S. airports use the same three-letter location identifier for the FAA and IATA, however, Blue Ridge Airport's FAA identifier is MTV, and it has no IATA code (Mota Lava Airport in Mota Lava, Vanuatu holds the IATA identifier MTV).

== Facilities ==
The airport covers 270 acres (110 ha) at an elevation of 941 feet (287 m). Its single runway, 13/31, is 5,002 by 100 feet (1,525 x 30 m) asphalt.

In the year ending September 30, 2017 the airport had 23,500 aircraft operations, average 64 per day: 96% general aviation, 3% air taxi, and <1% military. 20 aircraft were then based at the airport: 80% single-engine, 15% multi-engine, and 5% jet.
