= 3Xtrim 3X55 Trener =

Recreational and utility aircraft

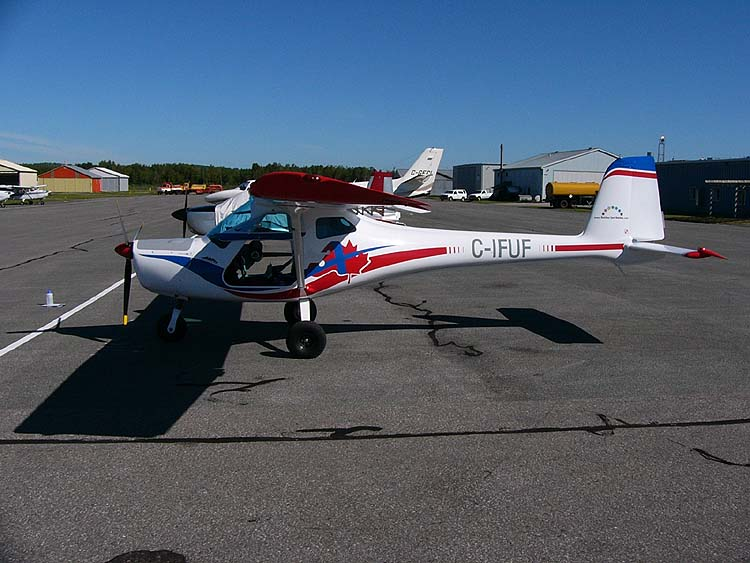

General information
- Type: Ultralight aircraft
- Manufacturer: 3Xtrim Aircraft Factory
- Designer: Adam Kurbiel
- Number built: 60 (to Sept 2006)

History
- First flight: 1996

The 3X55 Trener (Trainer) and 3X47 Ultra are a family of ultralight aircraft produced in Poland by the 3Xtrim Aircraft Factory. Both are two-seat, high-wing, strut-braced monoplanes with fixed tricycle undercarriage and available only as completed aircraft. There are also 450 Ultra and 495 Ultra Plus sub-variants of the 3X47 Ultra, with gross weights adjusted for national ultralight regulations.

The US light sport aircraft version of the 3X55 is known as the Navigator 600 and has a 1320-pound maximum gross takeoff weight

3Xtrim take their company name from a double entendre, as they refer to their designs being "triple trimmed" (or more exactly "triple-tested") during the design, prototype and production stages and also that the aircraft is designed for "extreme conditions". In English the company name is pronounced "Three-Extreme".

== Development ==
Former SZD sailplane engineer Adam Kurbiel designed the predecessor of 3X55, the EOL-VLA, to conform to European JAR-VLA rules. That plane was modified through the years to meet Canadian Advanced Ultralight and US Light Sport Aircraft rules. The 3X47 version is specifically for the European market to meet those standards.

The designation 3X55 means "3Xtrim Aircraft – 550 kg gross weight" while the 3X47 refers to its 470 kg gross weight.

The European versions feature extensive structural use of carbon fibre to achieve lightness, while the 3X55 is predominantly of fibreglass construction. Otherwise the two aircraft are similar in appearance and performance.

The 3X55 first flew in 1996 and by the summer of 2006 about 60 aircraft of both types had been produced.

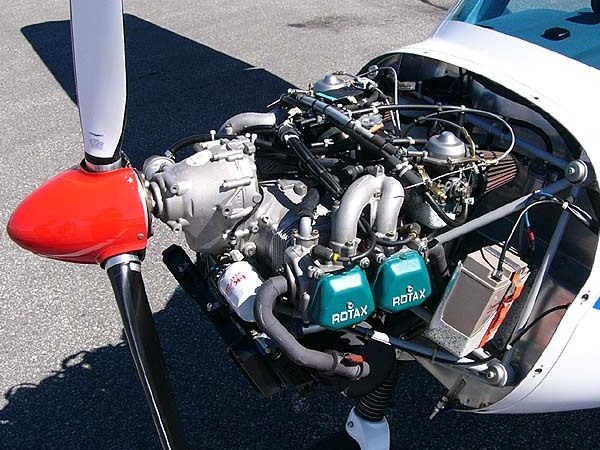
3Xtrim 3X55 showing its Rotax 912ULS engine installation

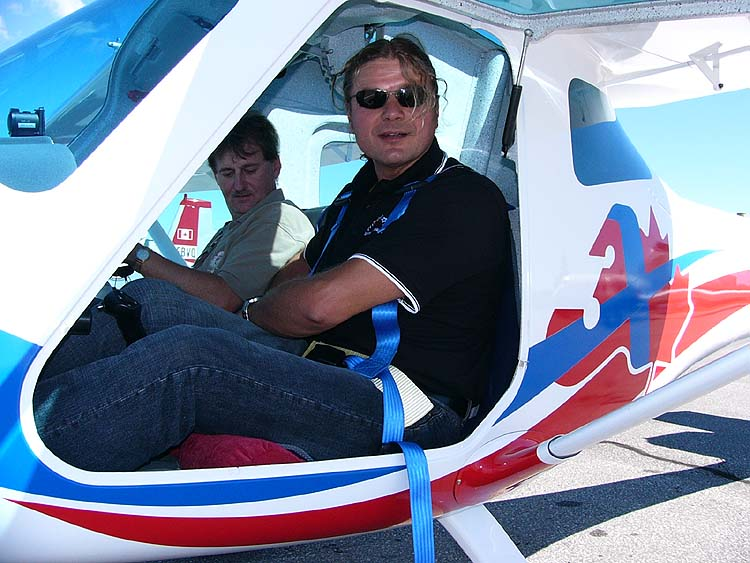
3Xtrim 3X55 showing its cockpit accommodation for two crew, side-by-side with vertically-hinged doors

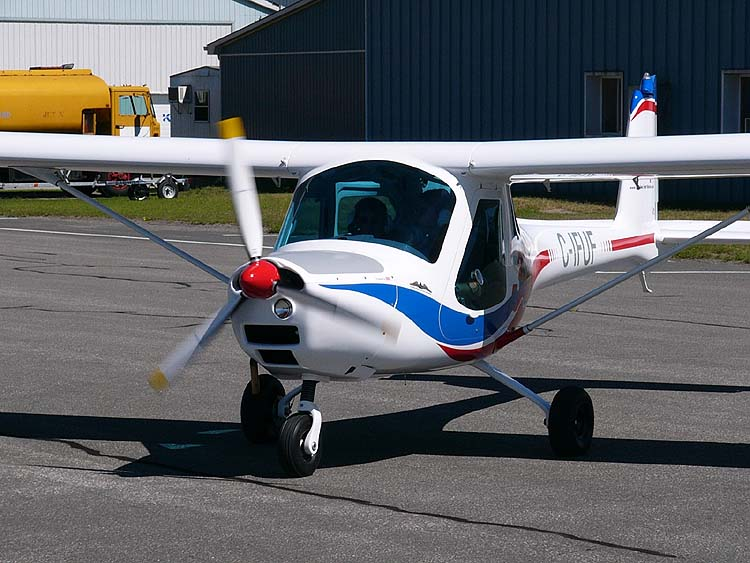
3Xtrim 3X55 taxiing, showing front view of the aircraft

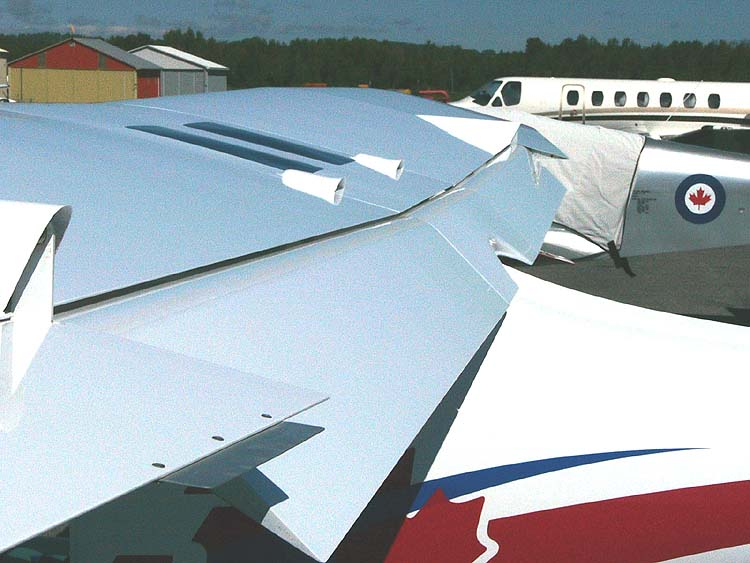
3Xtrim 3X55 with 30 degrees of flap deflection, showing the centre-section flap

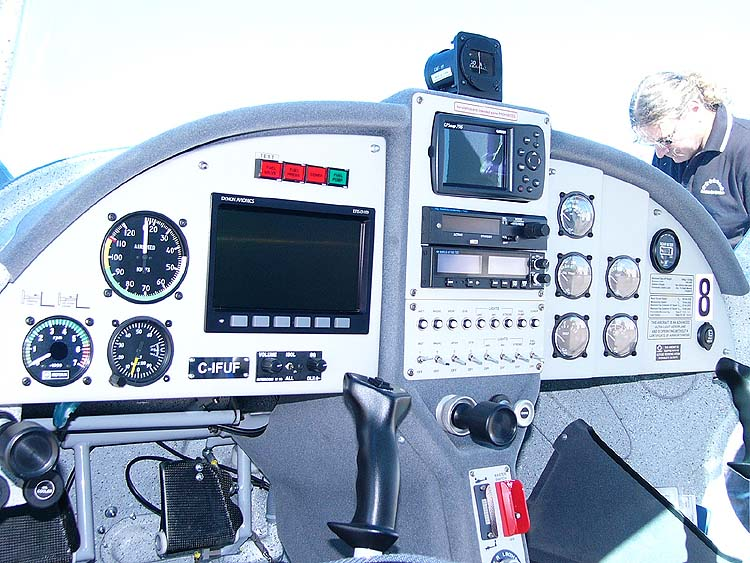
3Xtrim 3X55 instrument panel

== Design ==
The fuselage and vertical tail of the 3X55 is a one-piece structure made from fibreglass. The firewall is a Fiberfrax ceramic/aluminium sandwich.

The cockpit is 47.5 inches (1.21 m) wide at the elbows. Crew access is via a door on each side of the cockpit that hinges upwards and is supported by a gas strut.

The control sticks are located conventionally in front of each seat. The standard throttle arrangement is one panel-mounted centre throttle, but a second throttle located on the left side of the panel is optional, allowing the left-seat pilot to fly with either hand on the throttle or stick.

The wings are strut-braced with a single spar and are made from fibreglass and foam with a 15.5% CAGI.R3 airfoil. The wing has a span of 31 .5 feet and an area of 127.4 sq ft (11.84 m^{2}), which gives it a wing loading of 9.5 lbs/sq ft at gross weight. The aircraft has removable wings, with single locking pins and quick-disconnect controls which can be easily hooked up and inspected from inside the cockpit.

The wings have conventional Frise ailerons and slotted flaps. The elevator and rudder are also conventional. Ailerons and elevator are controlled by dual centre-mounted sticks through push-pull tubes, while the rudder is controlled by cables. The rudder cables attach to the rudder by wrapping around the wide bottom diameter of the rudder itself. The pitot tube is mounted on the left-hand strut.

The flaps are operated by a ceiling-mounted flap handle with detents for 0, 15 and 30 degrees of deflection. The flaps are controlled directly with the handle attached to a flap centre-section behind the fuselage and the wing flaps plug into the flap centre-section. Flaps are normally set to 15 degrees for takeoff and 30 degrees for landing.

The plane comes in one colour – white, but owners can add their own vinyl decals to finish the plane as desired.

=== Fuel capacity ===
The fuel tank is located behind the right-hand seat. The quantity can be read directly through a sight gauge behind the seat. The standard tank is 70 litres (18 US gallons) with 87 litres (23 US gallons) optional. Behind the left-hand seat is a small baggage compartment, with additional baggage space above and behind both seats.

=== Powerplant ===
The 3X55 powerplant options are the 80 hp (60 kW) Rotax 912UL, the 100 hp (75 kW) 912ULS or the 80 hp (60 kW) Jabiru 2200. The standard fuel is premium auto fuel, but it can run on 100LL as well.

The 3X55 can be equipped with either a three-bladed, fixed pitch Czech-made Woodcomp wood/fibreglass SR 200 propeller or an electrically adjustable Woodcomp SR 2000 propeller, with an optional constant speed unit.

=== Landing gear ===
The main landing gear consists of sprung fibreglass gear legs with 5X5.00 tires as standard on graphite wheel rims. Larger 6X6.00 tires are optional. The nose gear is a single-fork design also made from fibreglass. Nose gear suspension is a compressed rubber donut system.

== Competition history ==
Krzysztof Wieczorek won the 16th FAI World Precision Flying Championship in 2004 and took the 3rd place in the 14th FAI World Rally Flying Championship in 2004 flying 3Xtrim aircraft. In the 17th FAI World Precision Flying Championship in 2006, 3Xtrim took the 1st (Krzysztof Wieczorek) and 3rd (Krzysztof Skrętowicz) places.

== Specifications (550 Trener) ==
Data from Jane's All The World's Aircraft 2003–2004

General characteristics

- Crew: one
- Capacity: one passenger
- Length: 6.87 m (22 ft 6 in)
- Wingspan: 10.03 m (32 ft 11 in)
- Height: 2.4 m (7 ft 10 in)
- Wing area: 12.4 m^{2} (133 sq ft)
- Aspect ratio: 8.1:1
- Airfoil: TsAGI R-3 (15.5%)
- Empty weight: 325 kg (717 lb)
- Max takeoff weight: 550 kg (1,213 lb)
- Powerplant: 1 × Rotax 912 4-cylinder air-cooled horizontally-opposed piston engine, 73.4 kW (98.4 hp)

Performance

- Cruise speed: 170 km/h (110 mph, 92 kn)
- Stall speed: 70 km/h (43 mph, 38 kn)
- Never exceed speed: 220 km/h (140 mph, 120 kn)
- Range: 750 km (470 mi, 400 nmi)
- Service ceiling: 4,000 m (13,000 ft)
- Rate of climb: 4.5 m/s (890 ft/min)

== See also ==
Aircraft of comparable role, configuration, and era

- Fantasy Air Allegro
- Flight Design CT
- Jabiru Aircraft
