= RNIE 5 =

National highway of Benin

Location
- Country: Benin

Highway system
- Transport in Benin

RNIE 5 is a national highway of Benin with a length of 106.058 kilometres (65.901 mi).
