= RNIE 4 =

National highway of Benin

Location
- Country: Benin

Highway system
- Transport in Benin

RNIE 4 is a national highway of Benin. It joins the RNIE 2 at Bohicon.

== Cities and towns ==
- Bohicon
