= RNIE 7 =

National highway of Benin

Location
- Country: Benin

Highway system
- Transport in Benin

RNIE 7 is a national highway of Benin. It is located in Atakora Department, near the Forêt Classée de la Sota, and runs for approximately 69 km.
