= RNIE =

Highway system in Benin

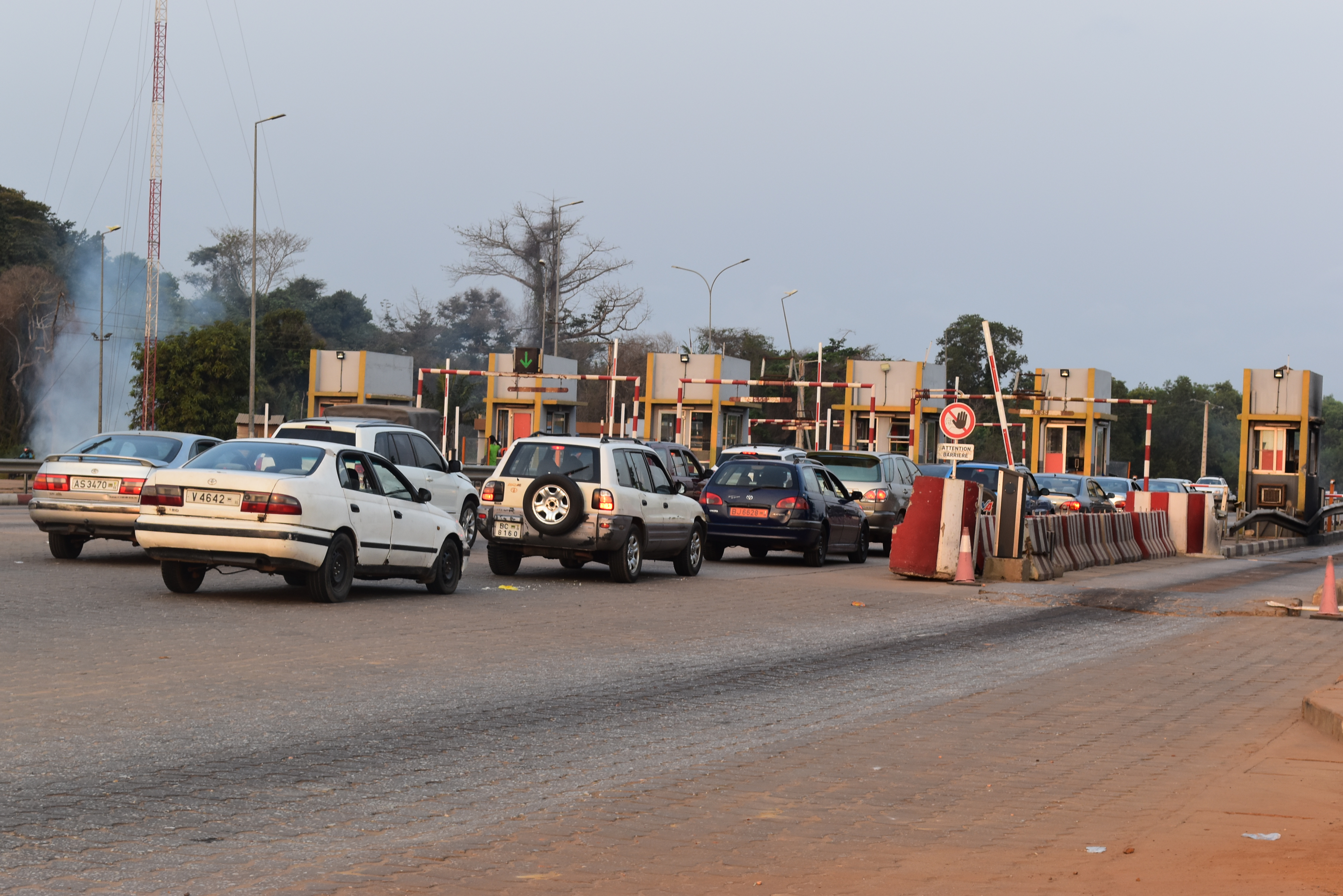
A toll-booth at Ouidah for the RNIE 1

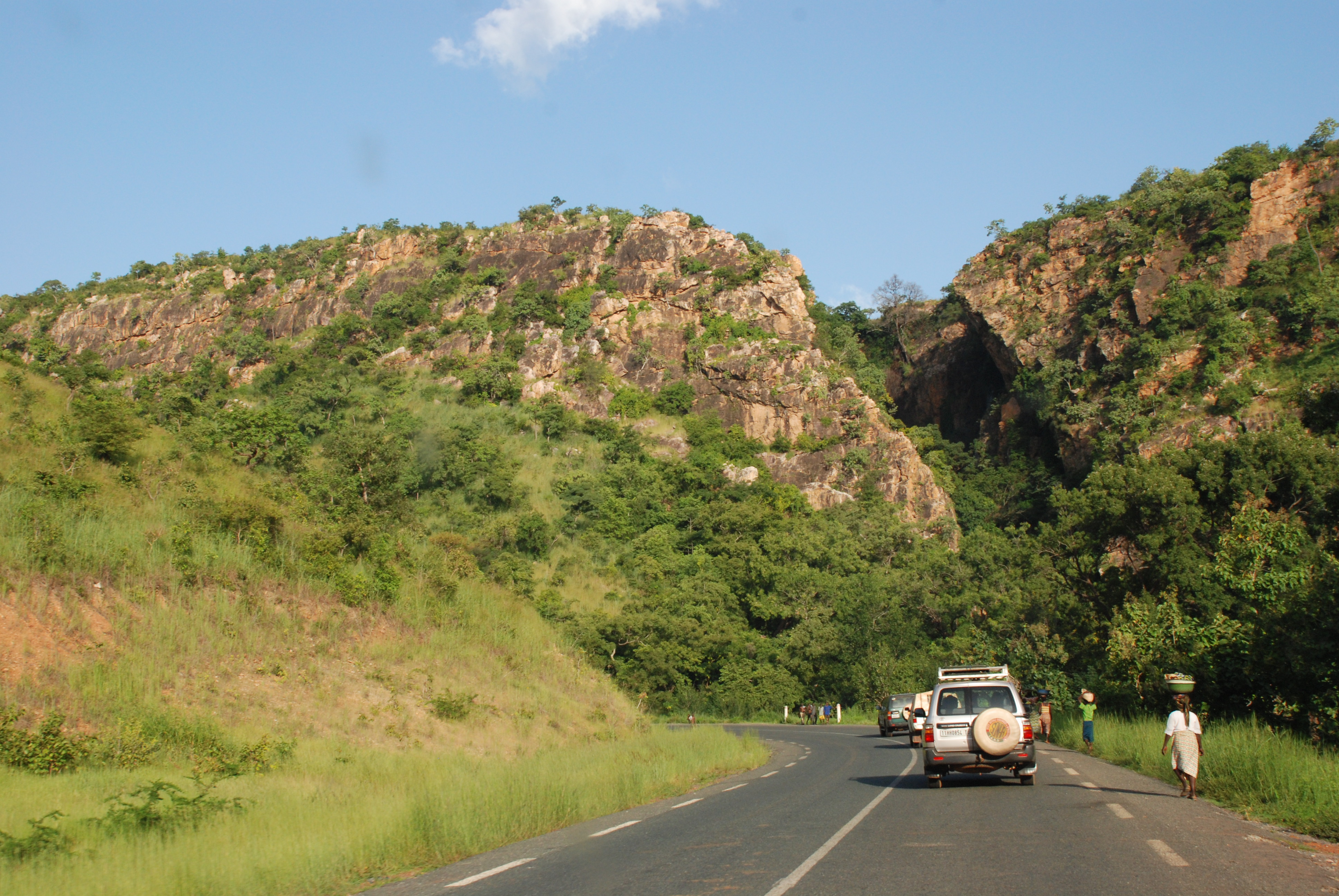
The RNIE 3 south of Tanguiéta, and 50 km north of Natitingou in northwest Benin

RNIE or the Route Nationale refers to the highway system in Benin.

As of 2001, there are seven categorised RNIE highways, which total 2,178km. Benin's main north–south highway is the RNIE 2 which runs the entire 785 km from the Niger River to Cotonou. The RNIE 2 crosses the RNIE 4 at Bohicon east of Abomey.

== List of highways ==
Number	Route	Length
RNIE 1	Nigeria – Ouidah – Cotonou - Porto-Novo – Sakété – Togo	180km
RNIE 2	Cotonou – Savé – Parakou – Malanville – Niger	750km
RNIE 3	Dassa-Zoumé – Djougou – Porga – Burkina Faso	448km
RNIE 4	Togo – Abomey – Kétou – Nigeria	160km
RNIE 5	Doume – Savalou - Glazoué - Savè – Nigeria	150km
RNIE 6	Togo – Djougou – N'Dali – Nikki – Nigeria	300km
RNIE 7	Nigeria – Segbana – Kandi – Burkina Faso	22km
