= Niamey railway station =

Railway station in Niamey, Niger

Niamey
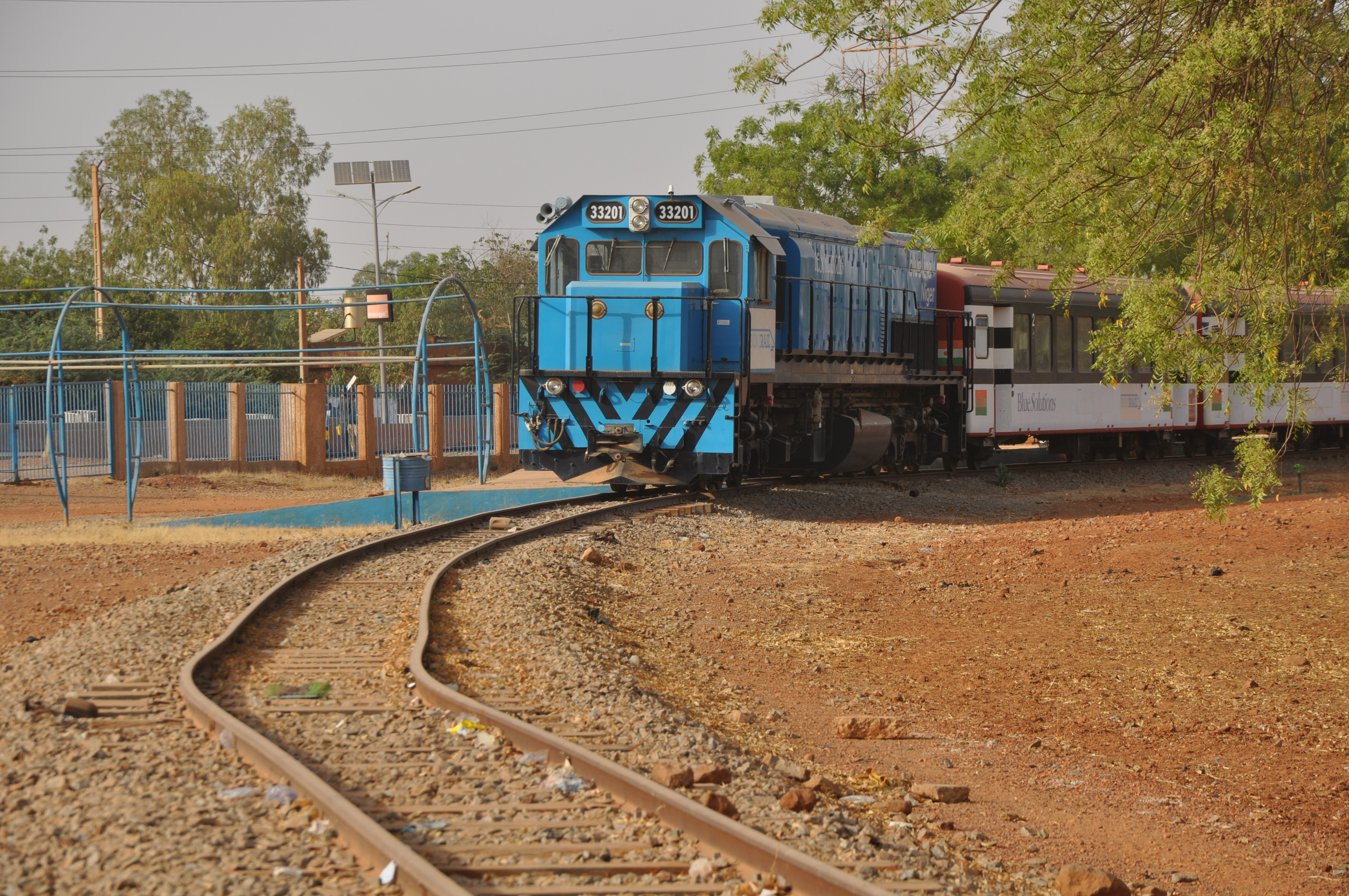
- Locomotive at Niamey Terminus station (2019).

General information
- Location: Bluezone Niamey, Boulevard du 15 Avril; Hippodrome, Commune IV, Niamey; Niger
- Coordinates: 13°29′54.48″N 2°8′7.61″E
- System: Inter-city & Commuter rails
- Owner: Government of Niger
- Line: Niamey-Dosso-Kandi-Parakou-Cotonou
- Platforms: 1 (not finalized)
- Tracks: 1 (not finalized)

History
- Opened: April 7, 2014; 12 years ago
Location

Rail map of Benin including the line Parakou-Niamey (light red), under construction

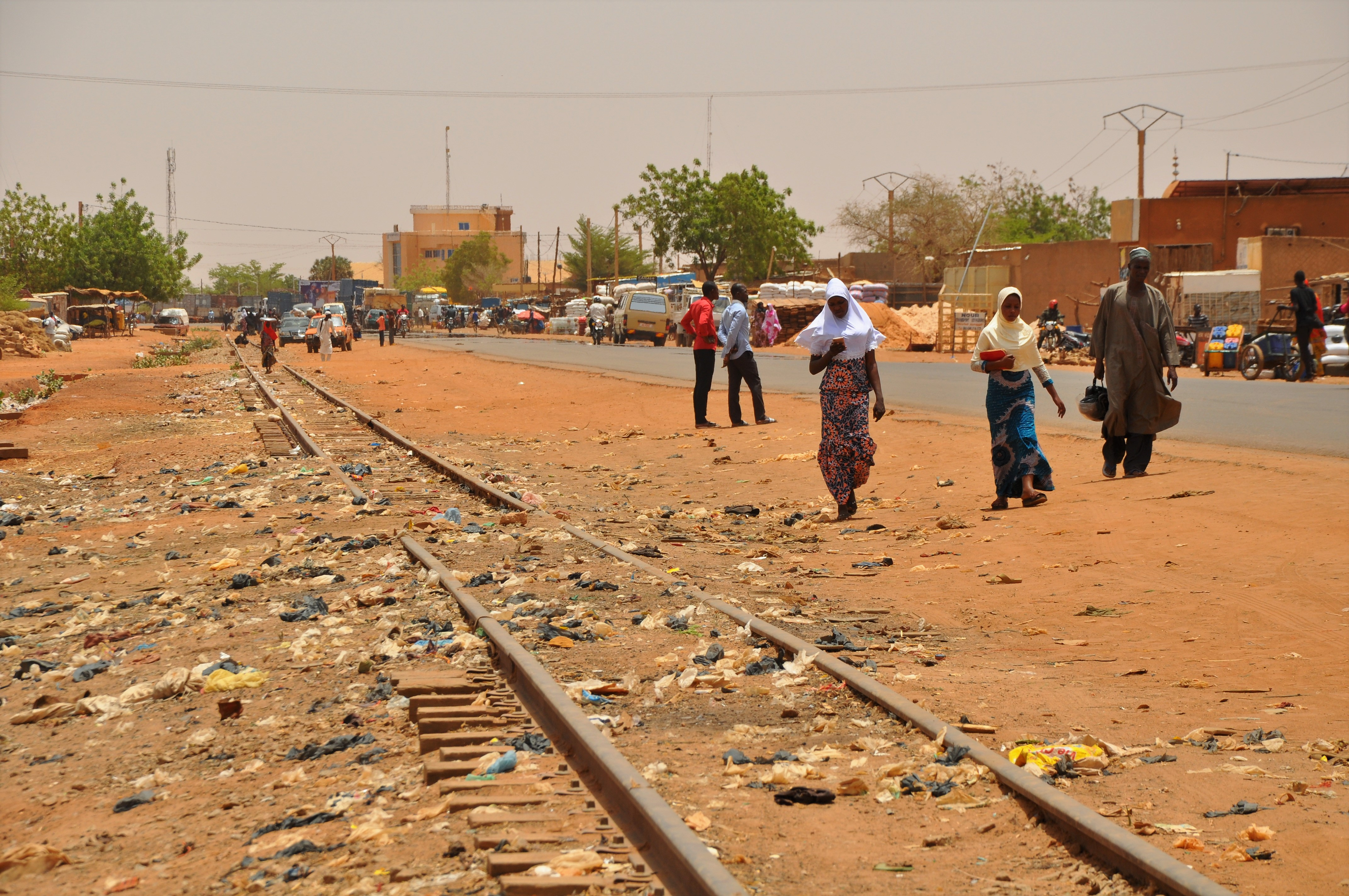
The tracks through Niamey

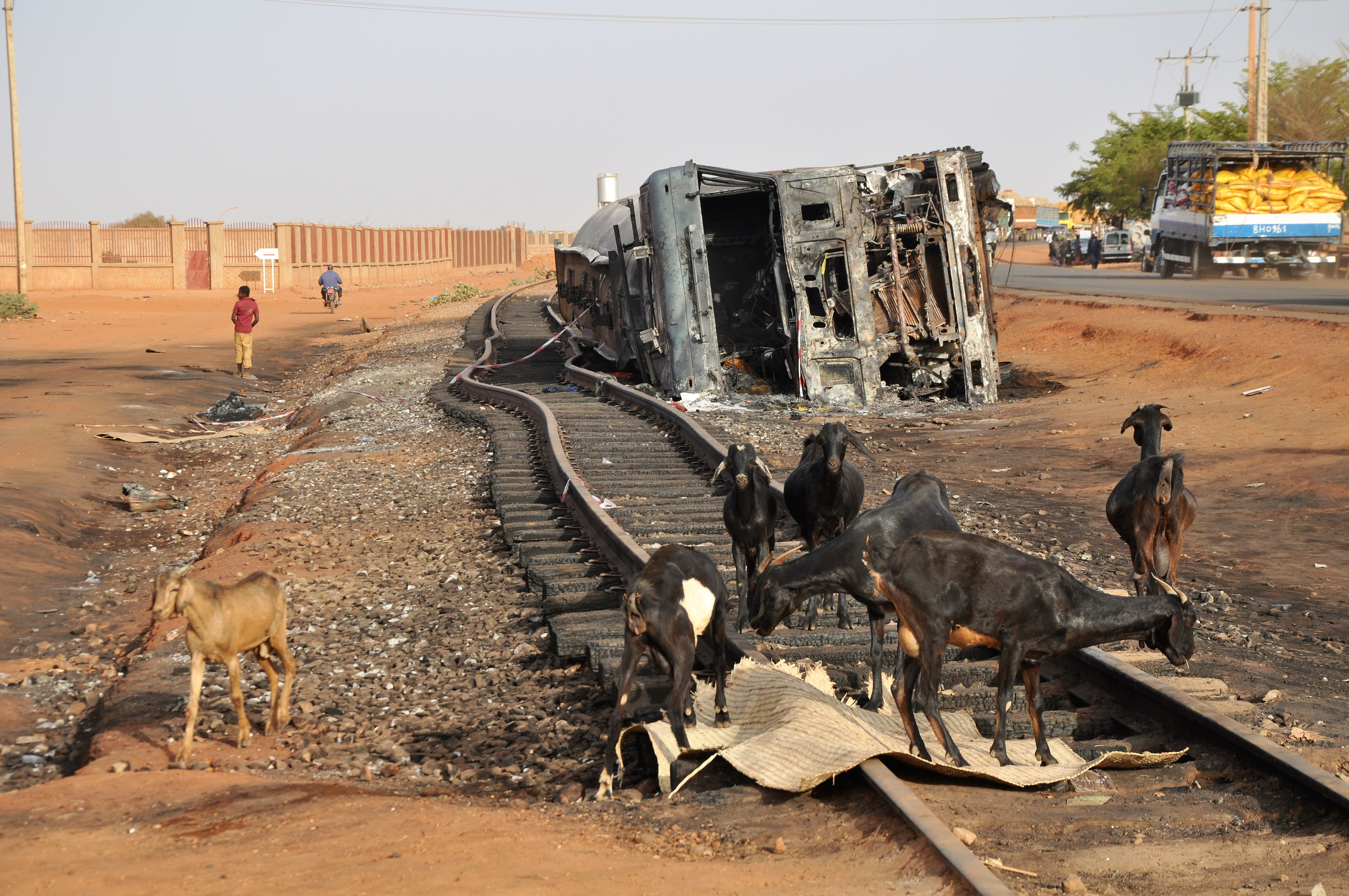
Accident with fuel truck (2019)

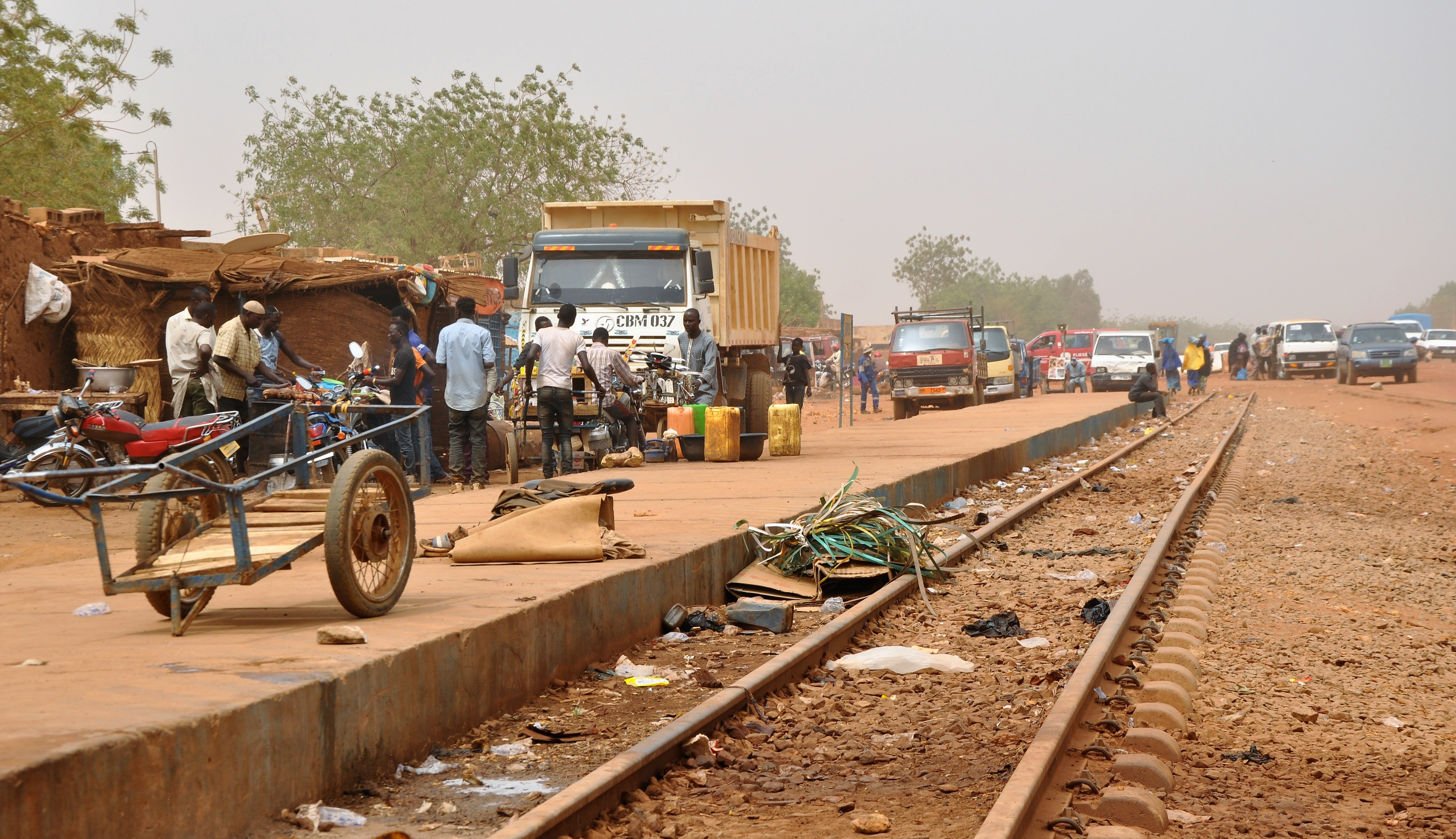
Niamey "Aeroport" railway station

Niamey (French: Gare de Niamey), or "Niamey Terminus", colloquially also known as Niamey Hippodrome, is the main railway station of the city of Niamey, the capital of Niger. It is the terminus of the Niamey-Dosso railway line. Located near the Niamey Racecourse (Hippodrome de Niamey), in Niamey IV borough, it is the first station opened in Niger and is part of AfricaRail project. A few kilometers further there is a second railway station in town, "Aeroport", near the airport.

== History ==
The station was officially inaugurated on 7 April 2014, with a ceremony and the arrival of the first train. The ceremony was attended by the Nigerien president Mahamadou Issoufou, along with the presidents of Benin, Thomas Boni Yayi, and Togo, Faure Gnassingbé; and Vincent Bolloré, chairman of the French group Bolloré. The group set up the structures for the reception of invited guests, and a section of 500 m of track for the circulation of the inaugural train, consisting of a diesel locomotive and some passenger cars. In the same day, it was also inaugurated, by the station, the "Bluezone Niamey". On January 29, 2016, the train line Niamey-Dosso of 143 km was inaugurated. But no trains have ever circulated here, and some parts of the track were already so badly eroded by 2019 (by water) that the entire line has become unusable. In Niamey station itself, a kink in the tracks caused by heat expansion - and bad construction techniques - makes it impossible for the train to even leave the station (see image). Further down the line, but still within the city limits, an accident with a fuel truck in May 2019 damaged the rails to such an extent that trains would not be able to pass that location (see image).

== Services and projects ==
As of 2015 there are no regular services but only tests on a track of 34 km, and educational visits. Once the station expansion and the line construction end, with the junction at the existing station of Parakou, in Benin, Niamey station would be the northern terminus of an international line to Cotonou, the largest Beninese city. However, the current line ends some 6 km south of Dosso in the middle of nowhere and never made it to the Benin border, as endless legal battles between Niger, Benin, Bolloré and other stakeholders frustrated all further investment.

Another future project would provide the construction of a line from Ouagadougou, the Burkinabé capital, that will link Niamey to Abidjan, in Ivory Coast.

== See also ==
- Rail transport in Niger
- Railway stations in Niger
- Rail transport in Benin
- Railway stations in Benin
