= Rail transport in Benin =

Railways in Benin existing 1000 mm gauge, conversion to 1435 mm gauge, dismantled 600 mm gauge

Benin has a total of 578 km (359 mi) of single track, 1,000 mm (3 ft 3 3/8 in) (metre gauge) railway. Rail construction began around 1900, with regular services commencing in 1906; rail operation was taken into government control (from private companies) in 1930.

Benin does not currently share railway links with adjacent countries, although at least three are planned, and the link into Niger is already under construction. Niger possesses no other railways; so the new line will provide a first and only rail route to and from that country. The other surrounding countries, Nigeria, Togo, and Burkina Faso, do have railway networks, but no Benin connections have yet been built. Benin will be a participant in the AfricaRail project.

The proposed Benin-Niger railway will be converted to 1,435 mm (4 ft 8 1/2 in) standard gauge.

== History ==
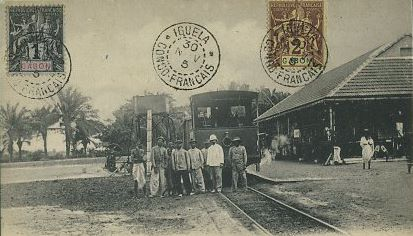
Locomotive at Ouidah railway station

=== Northern Line ===
The first railway in Benin was opened during the French colonial rule in 1906, between the port of Cotonou and Ouidah, by the Compagnie Française des Chemins de Fer du Dahomey. It was constructed in 1,000 mm (3 ft 3 3/8 in) metre gauge and was 47 km (29 mi) long. By 1936 the line was further extended to Parakou, totalling 437 km (272 mi) and became known as the Northern Line. The full line remains operational. A 1930 stock list shows that the Northern Line was then operating 19 steam locomotives from its Cotonou steam shed.

=== Eastern Line ===
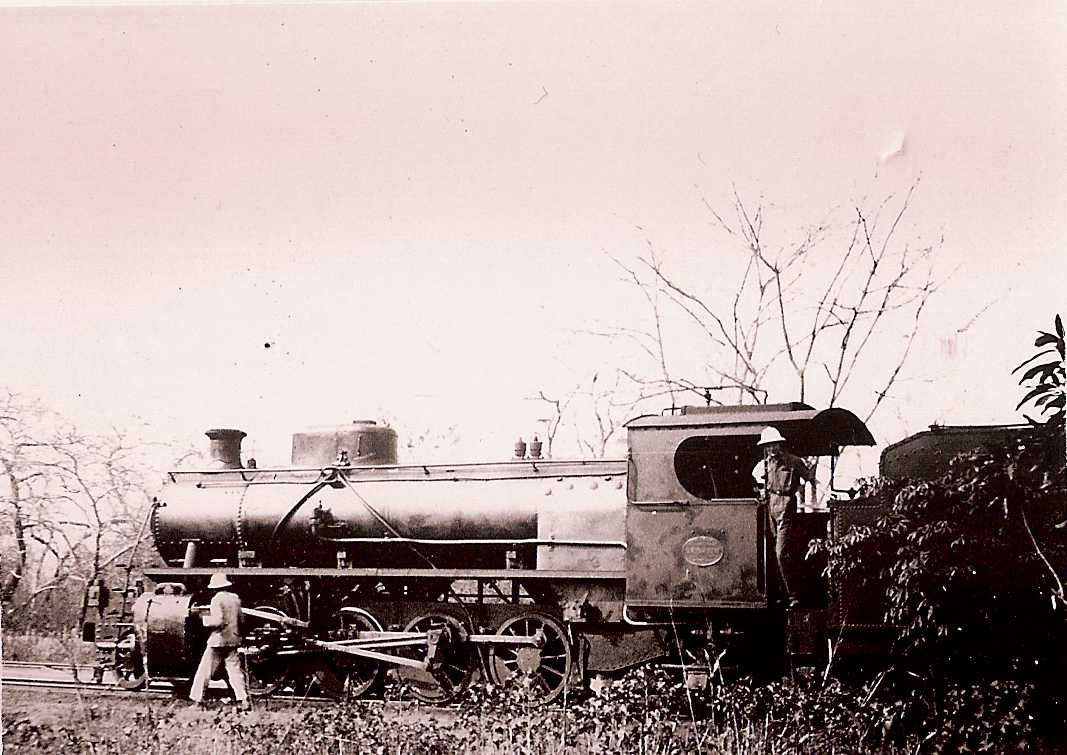
A steam locomotive in service in 1932.

An eastern branch from Cotonou to Pobé (107 km (66 mi)) was constructed by Chemin de Fer de Porto Novo à Pobé, opening in stages between 1907 and 1912, and later named the Eastern Line. The Eastern Line was closed in 1990, apart from the section from Cotonou to Porto-Novo (approximately one quarter of the line) on which freight services were retained, connecting with numbers of freight and industrial sidings in the capital district. This section was subsequently re-opened to passenger traffic in 1999, although this has since ceased again. A 1930 stock list shows that the Eastern Line was then operating 8 steam locomotives from its Cotonou steam shed.

=== Western Line ===
A western extension from Pahou on the Northern Line to Segboroué (33 kilometres (21 mi)) was also constructed by the Compagnie Française des Chemins de Fer du Dahomey, and opened very shortly after the Northern Line. The Western Line is intact, but derelict. There are currently no train services operating on the line, whose regular passenger services last ran in the 1990s.

=== Narrow gauge ===
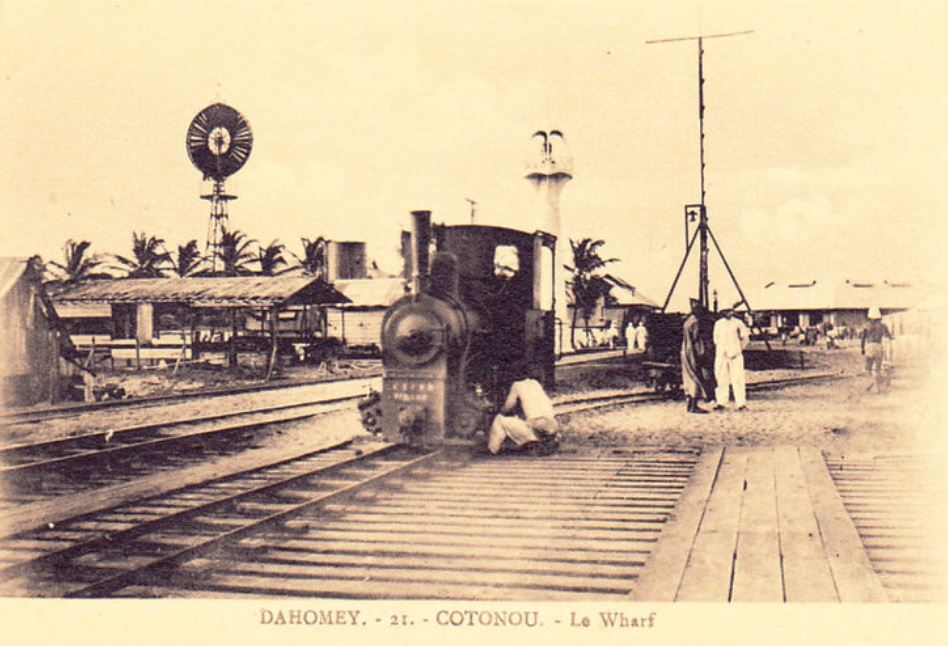
The Cotonou wharf narrow gauge railway in Dahomey (Benin).

In common with many other former French colonial states, the usual track gauge in Benin is 1,000 mm (3 ft 3 3/8 in) metre gauge. However, a number of narrow gauge railways have also operated historically, using 600 mm (1 ft 11 5/8 in) gauge.

The longest narrow gauge line was the Chemin de Fer d’Abomey-Bohicon-Zagnanado, operating from Abomey on the Northern Line to Zagnanado, a distance of 49 km. It opened in 1927 and closed in 1947.

The Chemin de Fer du Mono (in Mono Department), operated from Segboroué (terminus of the Western Line) to Hévé (where it connected with ferry services), a distance of 27 km, from 1931 until 1947, when passenger services ceased. A 10 km section between Segboroué and Comè remained open for freight services from a quarry for several years, but is now closed.

A third narrow gauge line operated on the original wharf at Cotonou, using an 0-4-0 steam tank engine. Several other minor industrial lines of 600 mm narrow gauge also operated at private commercial locations.

== Operation ==
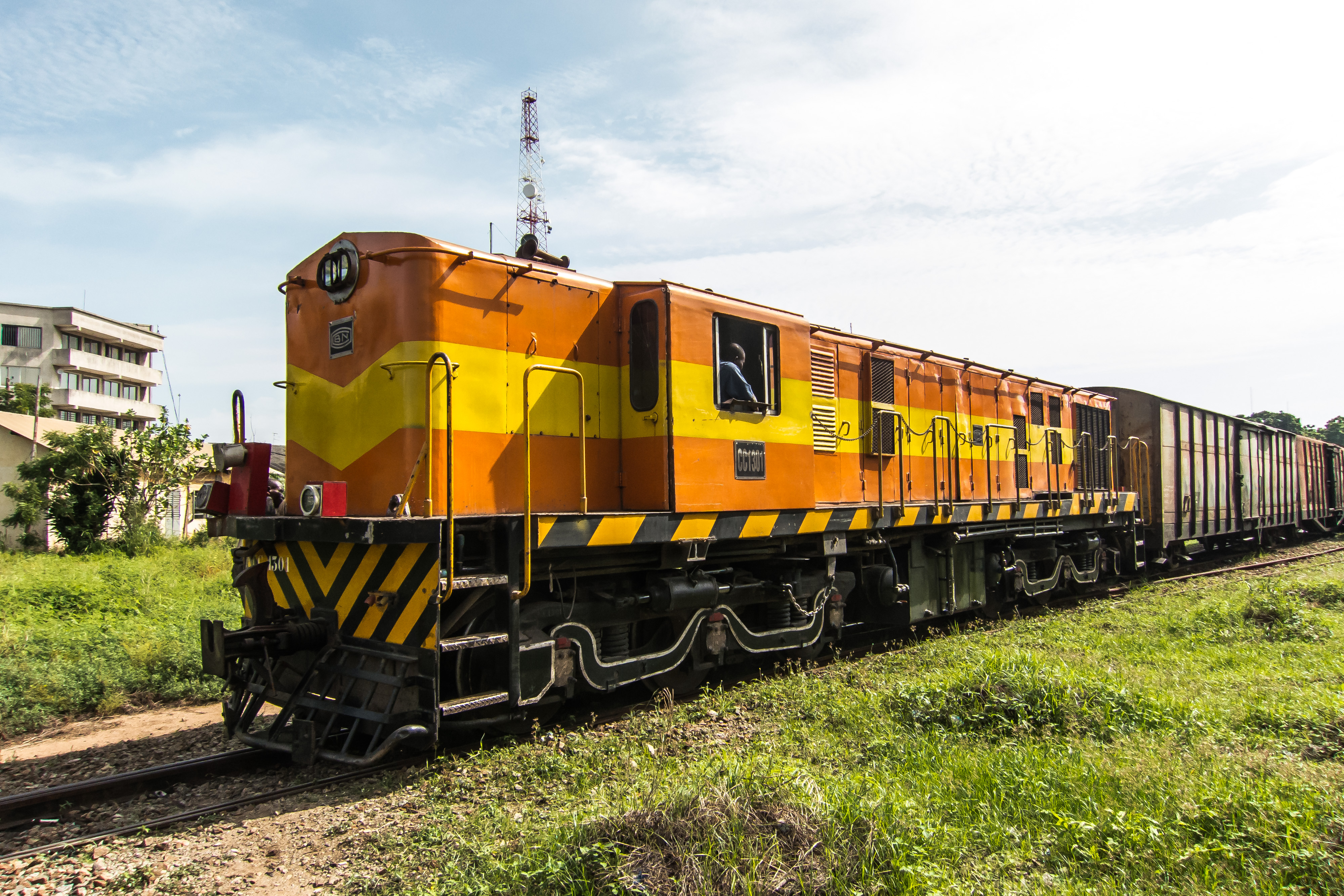
One of three locomotives acquired in 2008, CC1301 is seen here at Cotonou.

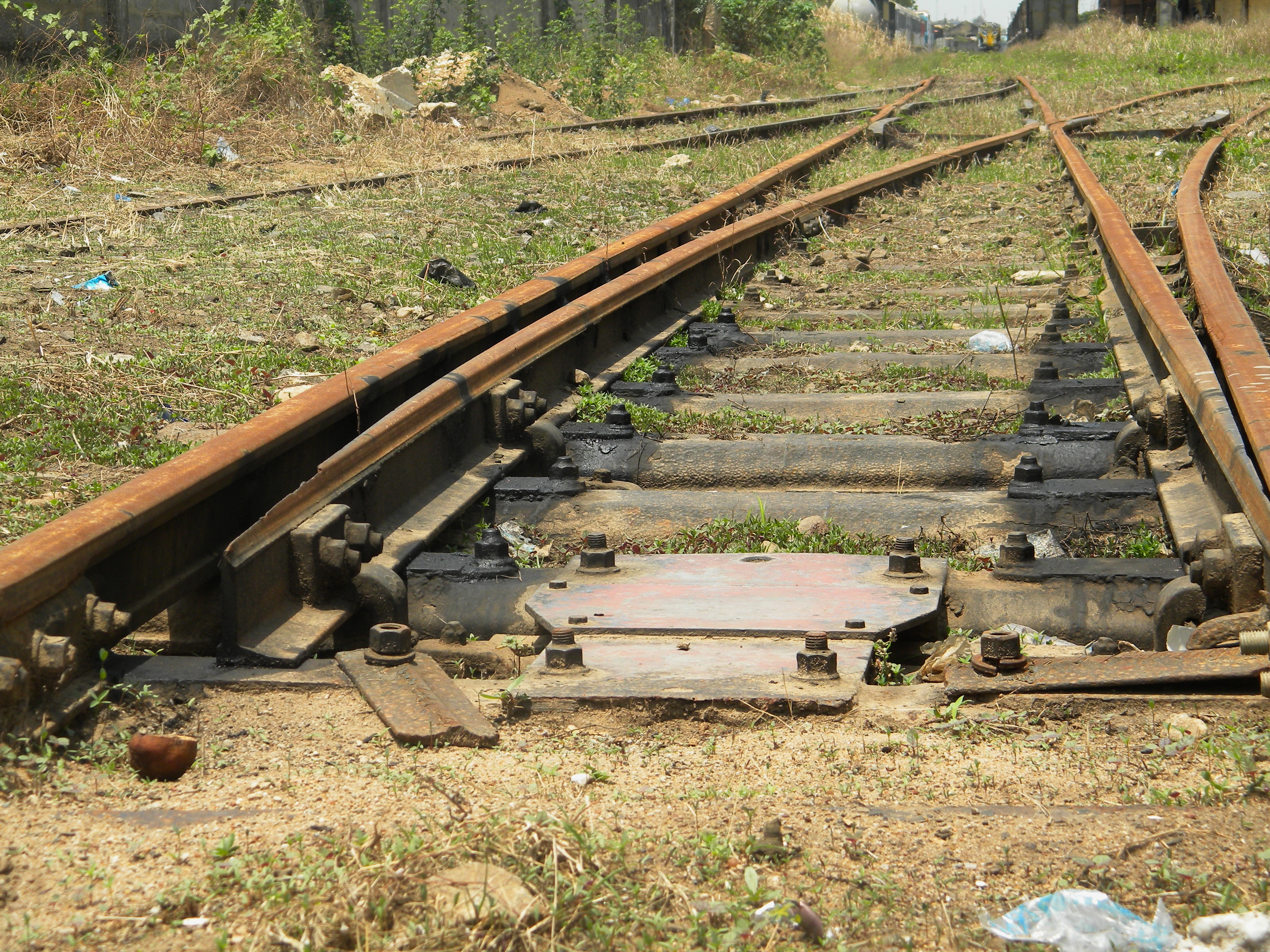
Disused permanent way

Operations by the Compagnie Française des Chemins de Fer du Dahomey and Chemin de Fer de Porto Novo à Pobé were nationalised in 1930. Today Organisation Commune Bénin-Niger des Chemins de Fer et des Transports (OCBN) operates services in Benin, and aims ultimately to operate them also in Niger.

Freight services still operate regularly. Passenger services, which were regular and reasonably reliable until about 2006 have become sporadic, although the government is committed to restoring a full passenger service.

There have been some experiments with tourist services and heritage trains, including the Train d'ebène (Ebony Train), and a 1997 heritage railway project using two YP locomotives from India, which is still under discussion. The Train d'ebène operates luxury tours using two coaches, one the former General Manager's private saloon, the other a former freight vehicle which has been converted into a bar car. A third coach, formerly the Presidential saloon, is undergoing restoration to join the train.

In 2008 the government announced planned development of the railway including the purchase of three diesel locomotives to be supplied by Golden Rock Railway Workshop in India, and renewed plans for the extension of services northwards into Niger (see below). The three new powerful Co-Co locomotives are numbered CC1301, CC1302, and CC1303.

== Proposed extensions ==
=== Northern extension ===
In 2005 it was proposed that Gaya, in Niger be connected to the railway network of Benin, with a planned completion date of 2018. The plans were reaffirmed in 2008, but construction did not begin until 2013. Some construction work was completed, but the project stalled in 2015 due to a legal challenge, from local Beninese company Petrolin, which had been awarded the original 2008 contract for the extension work, but had lost the contract in 2013 to the Bollore group, a company representing a public-private partnership.

In March 2018 President Patrice Talon again re-assigned the contract, this time to a consortium from China, also authorising the anticipated further extension within Niger to Niamey; the estimated project cost had risen to US$4 billion. Despite repeated setbacks, the project is continuing, and enjoys widespread regional support, as well as the strong personal backing of the President of Niger.

=== Connections with Burkina Faso and Togo ===
Further extension plans include connections to Burkina Faso and Togo. Due to a change in plans, the connection between from Benin and from Burkina Faso where were originally to be both 1000mm gauge are now to have a 1435mm-1000mm break of gauge at Niamey.

=== Connection with Nigeria ===
A standard gauge rail connection is planned from Parakou to Ilorin in Nigeria, with some reports that construction work has already commenced.

== Cities served by rail ==
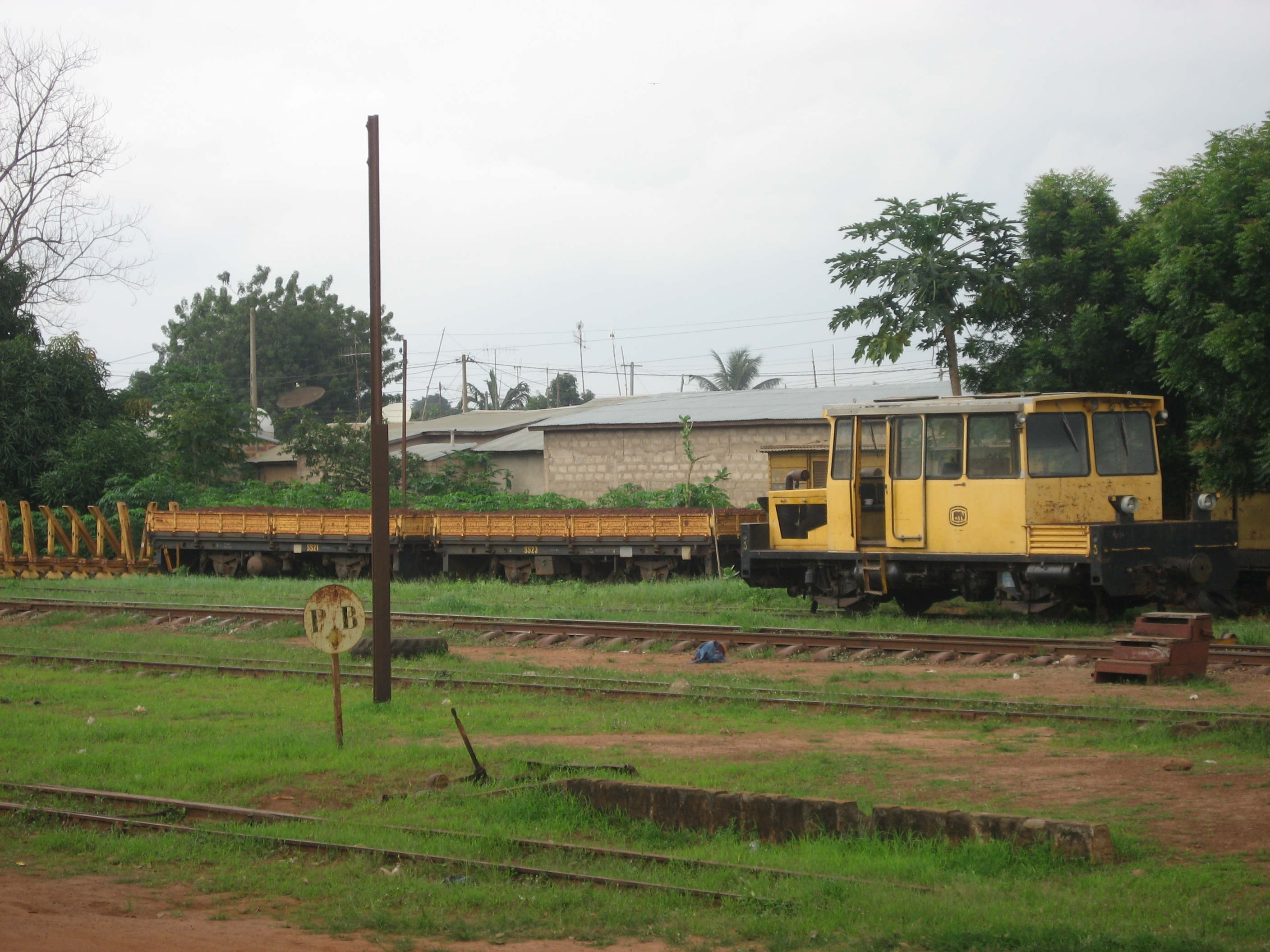
Bohicon railway station

Cities of Benin currently served by the country's railways are:

- (Benin) Cotonou – port
- (Benin) Porto-Novo – national capital
- (Benin) Parakou – railhead (1936)
- (Benin) Bohicon
- (Benin) Pobé – branch railhead
- (Benin) Ouidah
- (Benin) Segboroué – branch railhead in west
- (Benin) Dassa-Zoume

== Standards ==
- Coupling: Centre buffer and twin chains
- Brakes: Air

== See also ==
- Railway stations in Benin
- Transport in Benin
- Benin
- AfricaRail
