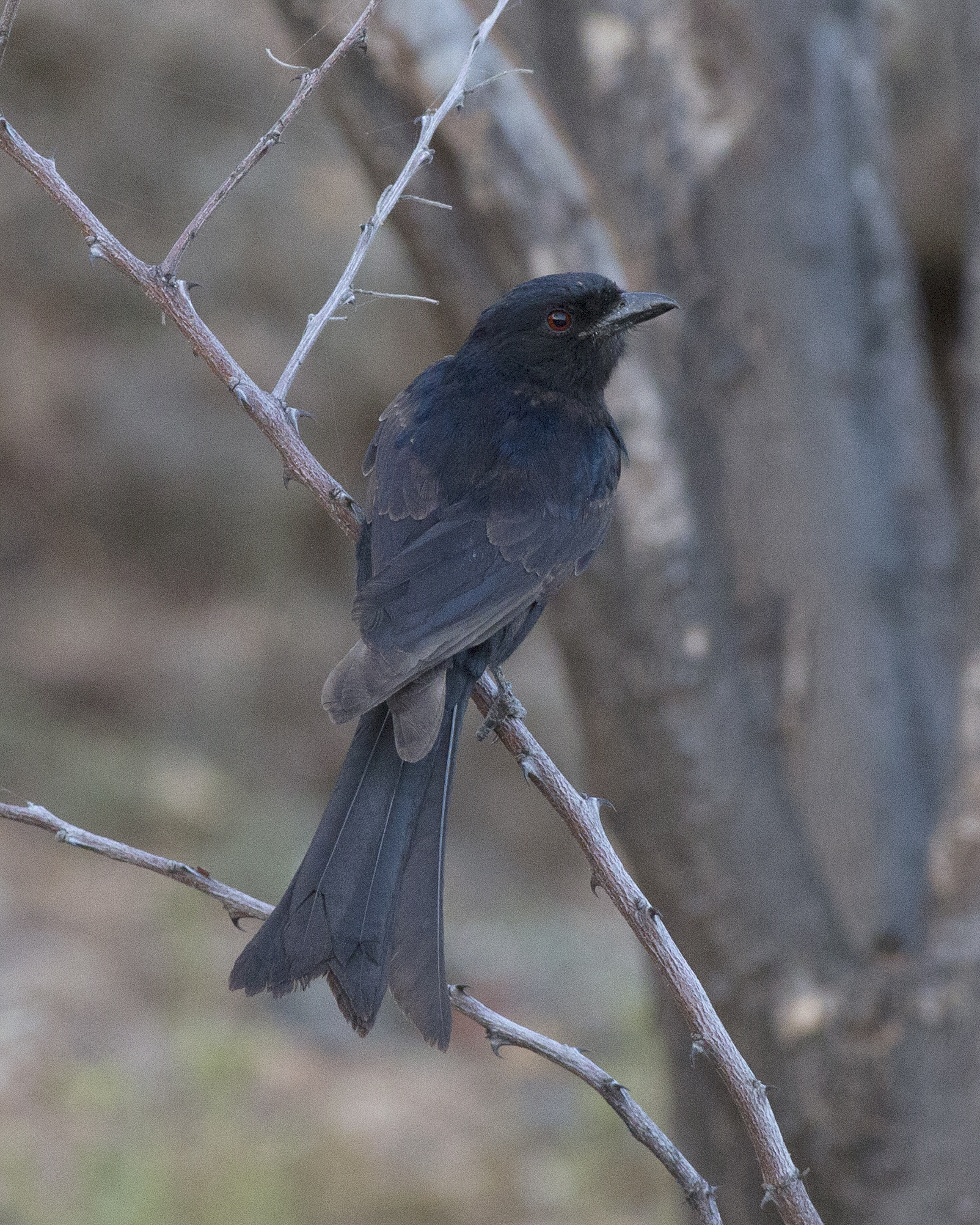

Scientific classification
- Kingdom: Animalia
- Phylum: Chordata
- Class: Aves
- Order: Passeriformes
- Family: Dicruridae
- Genus: Dicrurus
- Species: D. sharpei

Binomial name
- Dicrurus sharpei Oustalet, 1879

Synonyms
- Dicrurus ludwigii sharpei

= Sharpe's drongo =

Species of bird

Sharpe's drongo (Dicrurus sharpei) is a species of drongo found in sub-Saharan Africa, where it is distributed from southern South Sudan and western Kenya to the Democratic Republic of the Congo to Nigeria east of the Niger River and south of the Benue River.

Sharpe's drongo was described in 1879 by the French zoologist Émile Oustalet from a specimen killed at Doume on the Ogooué River in Gabon. He coined the binomial name Dicrurus sharpei. The specific epithet and the English name honours the English ornithologist Richard Bowdler Sharpe. It was long considered a subspecies of the square-tailed drongo (Dicrurus ludwigii) but a 2018 study of genetic divergences indicated that both were distinct species. It can be physically distinguished from D. ludwigii by the lack of white tips on the axillaries as well as having a dull purplish-blue iridescence rather than the greenish blue-black iridescence of D. ludwigii.
