= RNIE 1 =

National highway of Benin

Location
- Country: Benin

Highway system
- Transport in Benin

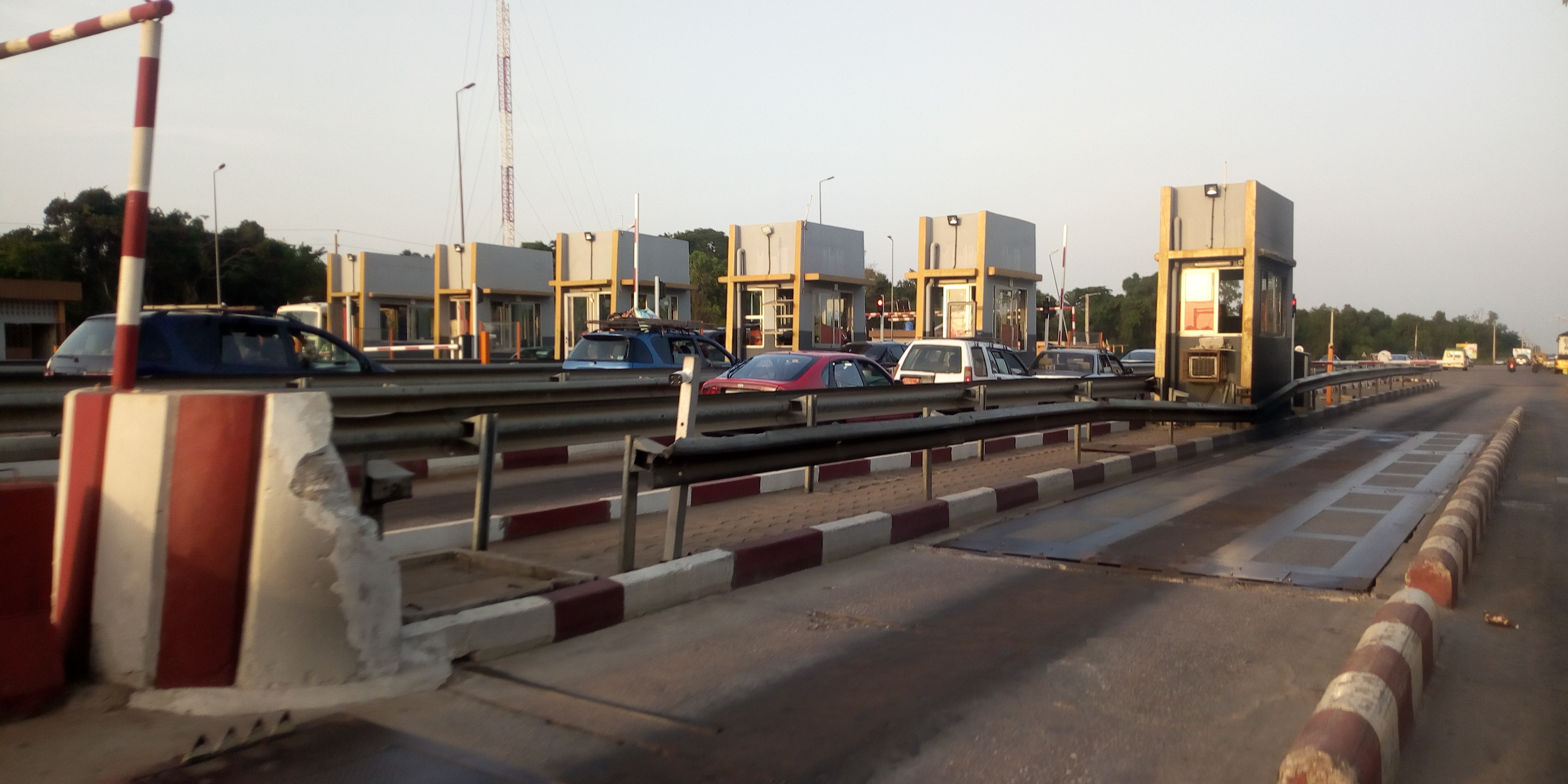
Toll bridge near Ouidah

RNIE 1 is a national highway of Benin. It runs along the Atlantic coast from the Togolese to the Nigerian border, and passes through Cotonou and Porto-Novo.
