= Commune IV (Niamey) =

Coordinates: 13°30′43″N 2°08′25″E

- Commune
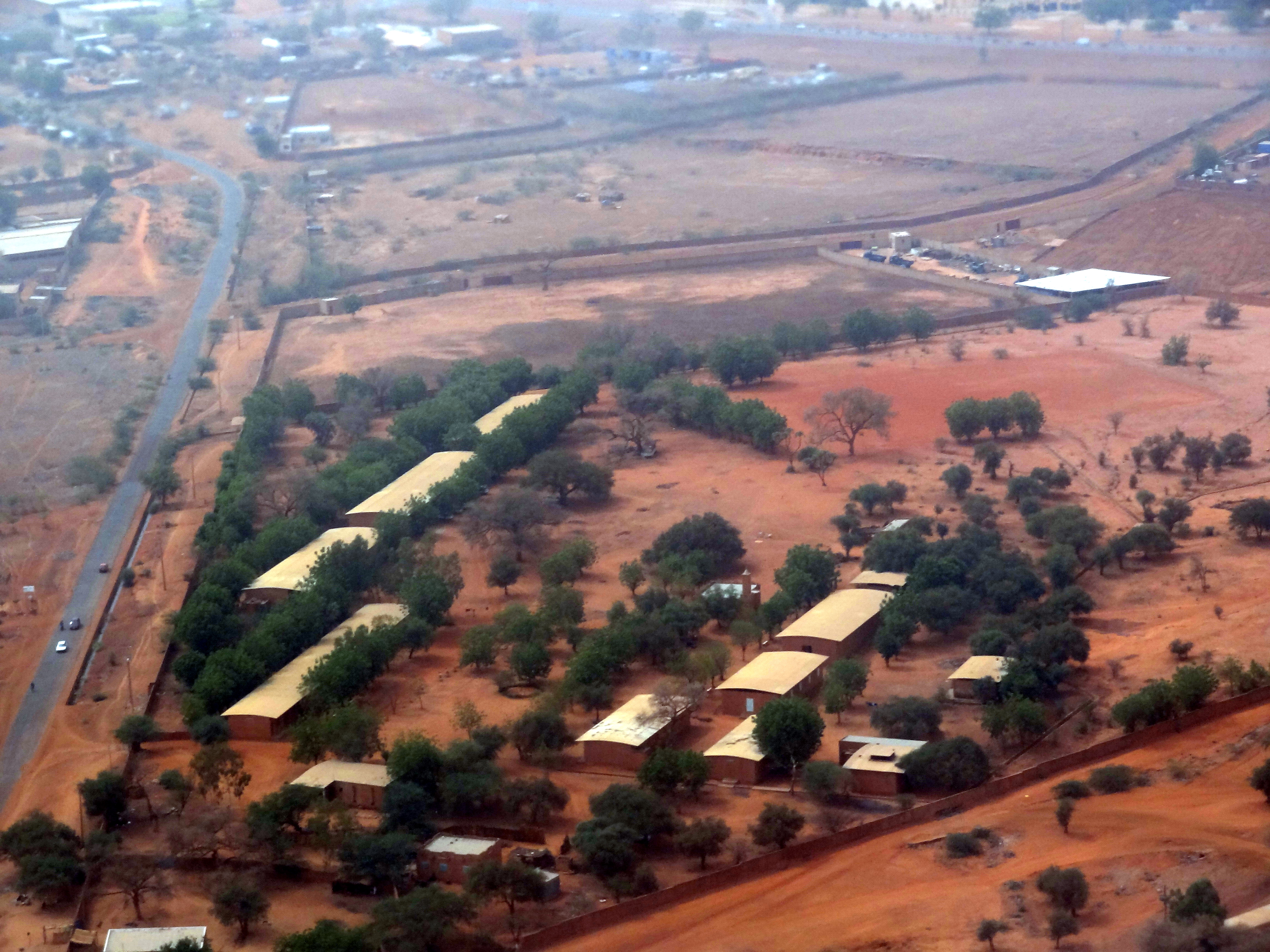

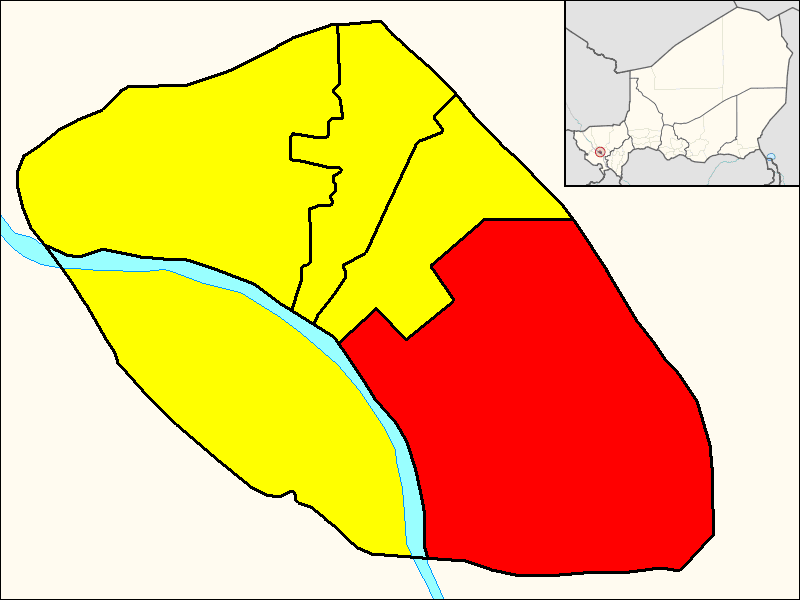
- Commune IV within Niamey
- Country: Niger
- Region: Niamey
- Time zone: UTC+1 (WAT)

Commune IV, also known as Niamey IV, is an urban commune in Niger. It is a commune of the capital city of Niamey.

== Transport ==
The commune is served by Niamey railway station and Niamey International Airport.

== Quartiers and villages ==
Niamey IV contains 22 quartiers:

- Aéroport I
- Aéroport II
- Gamkalley Golley
- Gamkalley Sébanguey
- Kafa Koiara
- Kobontafa
- Pays Bas I
- Pays Bas II
- Route Filingué I
- Route Filingué II
- Saga Banizoumbou
- Saga Fondobon
- Saga Gassia Kouara
- Saga Goungou
- Saga Kourtheye
- Saga Peulh
- Saga Sambou Koira
- Sary Koubou Nord Ouest
- Talladjé Est 50 M
- Talladjé Kouado
- Tchoureye Fondou
- Tondigammey

It contains 10 villages:

- Bossey Bangou
- Gorou Keyna Garey Do
- Kongou Gonga
- Kongou Gonga 2
- Kongou Zarmagandey
- Saga Gorou I
- Saga Gorou II
- Saga Fondabon
- Yaou Baba Kaira
- Kongou Balla Baba Kaira
