= Railway stations in Benin =

There has been continuous provision of rail transport in Benin since 1906. Railway stations in Benin include:

Railways in Benin existing 1000mm gauge, under construction 1000mm gauge, dismantled 600mm gauge

== Maps ==
- UN Map Benin

== Operational ==
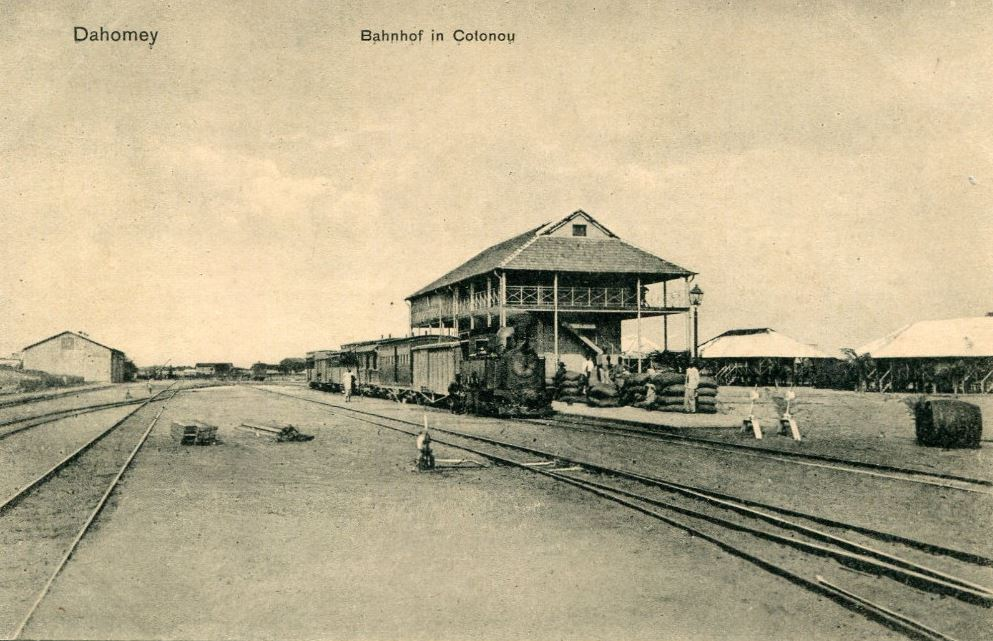
Historical image of Cotonou railway station.

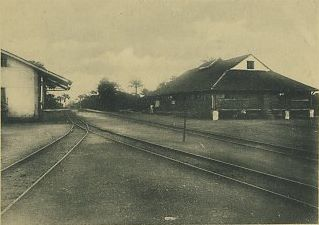
Historical image of Bohicon railway station.

- Cotonou – (0 km) port
- Porto-Novo – national capital; cement factory
- Bohicon
- Dassa-Zoumé
- Savé
- Parakou – (438 km) railhead in north

== Non operational ==
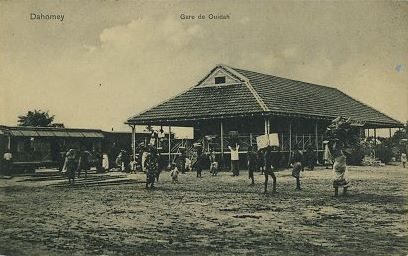
Ouidah railway station shortly after construction. The station is currently unused.

- Pobé – branch railhead in east
- Ouidah – on line to west
- Segboroué – branch railhead in west.

== Under construction ==
The section from Parakou to Niamey is metre gauge with concrete sleepers which cannot easily be converted to standard gauge.

- (2015)
- (Benin) Parakou (438 km) - railhead in north
- (Benin) Ndali
- (Benin) Kandi
- (Benin) Guéné
- (Benin) Lama-Kara
- (Benin) (Niger) border (574 km)
- (Niger) Gaya
- (Niger) Dosso
- (Niger) Kollo
- (Niger) Say - iron ore with 650Mt of reserves.
- (Niger) Niamey (1000 km)

== Proposed ==
- Cadjehoun St Jean
- Godomey
- Cococodji
- Pahou - terminus of suburban passenger service
- Sémé
- Porto-Novo
- Cotonou - terminus of suburban passenger service

== Closed ==
- Abomey – junction on former 600 mm (1 ft 11 5/8 in) Zagnanado narrow gauge line
- Zagnanado – branch terminus on former Zagnanado narrow gauge line
- Hévé – branch terminus on former Mono narrow gauge line (station intact, but line lifted)
- Comè – intermediate stop on former Mono narrow gauge line
- Adjaha – intermediate stop on former Mono narrow gauge line

== See also ==
- AfricaRail
- Railway stations in Niger
- Railway stations in Togo
- Transport in Benin
