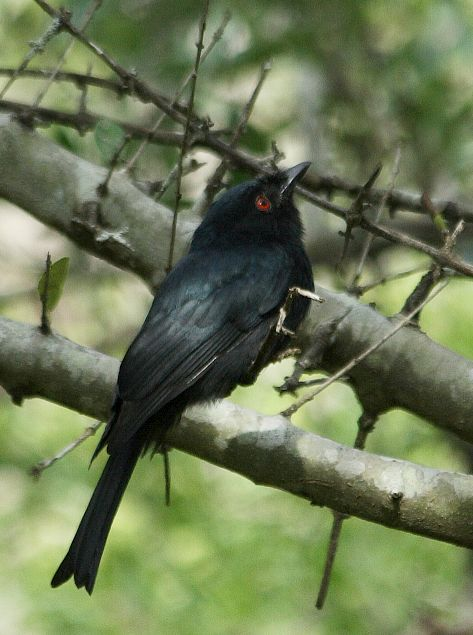
- Mkhuze Game Reserve, South Africa

Conservation status
- Least Concern (IUCN 3.1)

Scientific classification
- Kingdom: Animalia
- Phylum: Chordata
- Class: Aves
- Order: Passeriformes
- Family: Dicruridae
- Genus: Dicrurus
- Species: D. ludwigii

Binomial name
- Dicrurus ludwigii (Smith, A, 1834)

= Square-tailed drongo =

Common square-tailed drongo

Species of bird

The square-tailed drongo (Dicrurus ludwigii), formerly the common square-tailed drongo, is a passerine bird in the family Dicruridae. It is a common resident breeder in parts of southern Africa.

These insectivorous birds are usually found in forests or dense bush. They are aggressive and fearless birds, given their small size, at 19 cm (7.5 in), and will attack much larger species if their nest or young are threatened. The male is mainly glossy black, although the wings are duller. The female is similar but less glossy. The bill is black and heavy, and the eye is red. This species is similar to the fork-tailed drongo, but is smaller, and the shorter tail lacks the deep fork which gives the latter species its name. The fork-tailed drongo is also typically found in more open habitat. The common square-tailed drongo has short legs and sits very upright whilst perched prominently, like a shrike. It flycatches or take prey from the ground. The call is a harsh cherit-cherit. Two to three eggs are laid in a cup nest in a fork high in a tree.

== Taxonomy ==
The square-tailed drongo was described by the Scottish zoologist Andrew Smith in 1834 from birds observed around Port Natal (now Durban) in South Africa. He coined the binomial name Edolius ludwigii. The specific epithet was chosen to honour the German botanist Baron von Ludwig who collected plants in South Africa between 1805 and 1847. It is now placed with the other drongos in the genus Dicrurus that was introduced by the French ornithologist Louis Pierre Vieillot in 1816. Based on the results of a molecular phylogenetic study published in 2018, the taxonomy of the square-tailed drongo complex was reorganised. Sharpe's drongo which had previously been treated as a subspecies of Dicrurus ludwigii was promoted to species rank becoming Dicrurus sharpei. But those birds previously in Dicrurus ludwigii sharpei occurring between Senegal and the Niger River were considered as a separate species, the western square-tailed drongo (Dicrurus occidentalis).

Four subspecies are recognised:

- D. l. muenzneri Reichenow, 1915 – south Somalia and east Kenya to Tanzania, north Mozambique
- D. l. saturnus Clancey, 1976 – Angola (except northwest), north Zambia, north Mozambique
- D. l. tephrogaster Clancey, 1975 – Malawi, south and central Mozambique
- D. l. ludwigii (Smith, A, 1834) – South Africa to Limpopo River

== Gallery ==
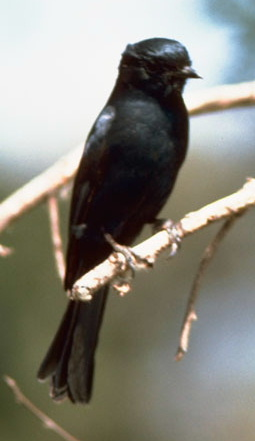
Square-tailed drongo, by United States Fish and Wildlife Service
