= Zémidjan =

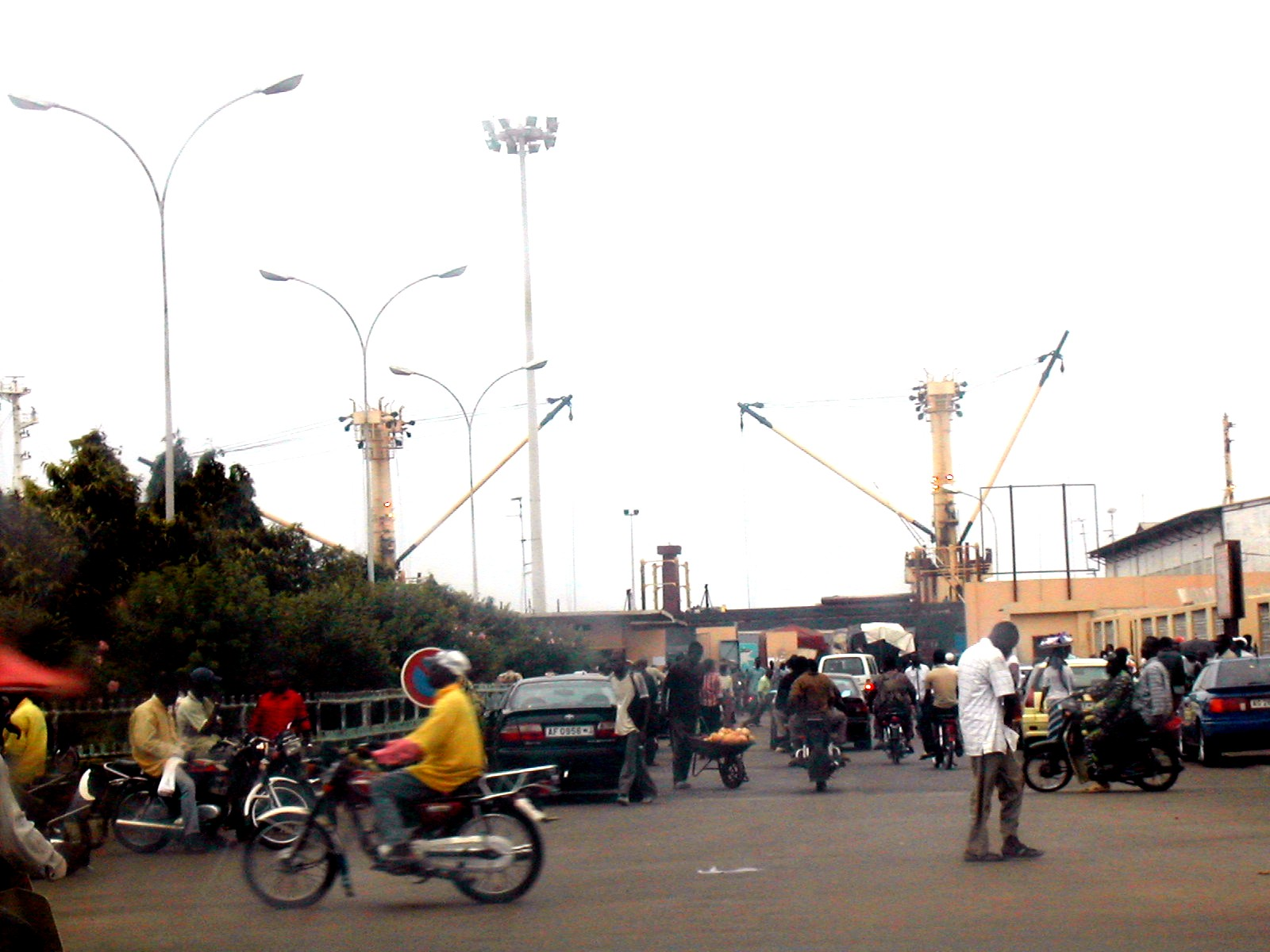
A yellow-uniformed zemidjan in Cotonou.

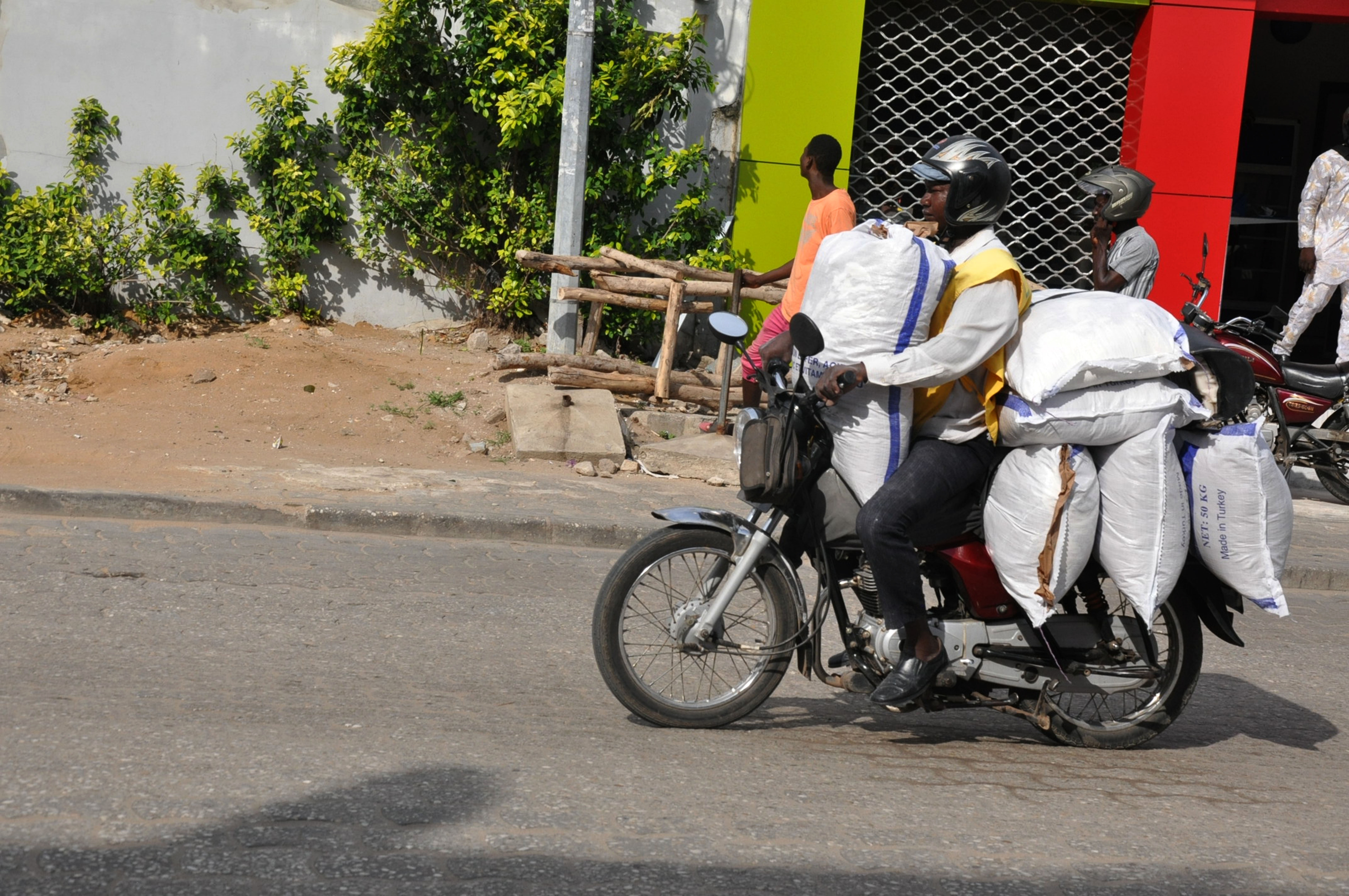
About 300 kg of rice loaded on a zemidjan in Cotonou.

A zémidjan (or zem) is a type of taxi found in Benin. The highest concentration is found in the largest city, Cotonou, where there are an estimated 72,000. Zémidjans are motorcycles that carry one to two passengers for short distances in towns. The fares are entirely negotiable. The drivers wear uniforms that are color-coded by city and have registration numbers on the back. The name derives from the Fon language, in which zémidjan means "get me there fast" or "take me quickly".

Would-be passengers summon a zémidjan by calling "kekeno", a word derived from the Fon language. 'Keke' means motorcycle and 'no' means the 'owner of': kekeno thus literally means 'owner of motorcycle'. The zémidjan typically stops by and the passenger and driver negotiate the price, depending on the final destination. The minimum rate is 100FCFA.

A movie called Dreamcycles by Nelson Roubert was made about the kekenos of Tevisodji Park.

== See also ==
- Taxicab
- Motorcycle taxi
