= Segboroué =

Coordinates: 06°24′N 01°58′E

Segbohoué is a town in lower western Benin. It lies on a coastal lake.

== Transport ==
It is the terminus of a branch railway from the capital.

== See also ==
- Railway stations in Benin.
