= Doume, Gabon =

Coordinates: 0.8464212°S 12.96300°E

Doume Doumé
- Village
- Interactive map of Doume
- Country: Gabon
- Province: Ogooué-Lolo
- Department: Mouloundou

Doume is a village in central Gabon. It is located in a forested region along the Ogooué River.

== Transport ==
It has a small station on the Trans-Gabon Railway.

== See also ==
- Transport in Gabon
