= Transport in Benin =

Benin possesses railway and road infrastructure, as well as two seaports. Benin currently does not have rail connections to other countries, but new proposals seek to change this.

== Railways ==
Railways in Benin existing 1000mm gauge, planned 1000mm gauge, dismantled 600mm gauge

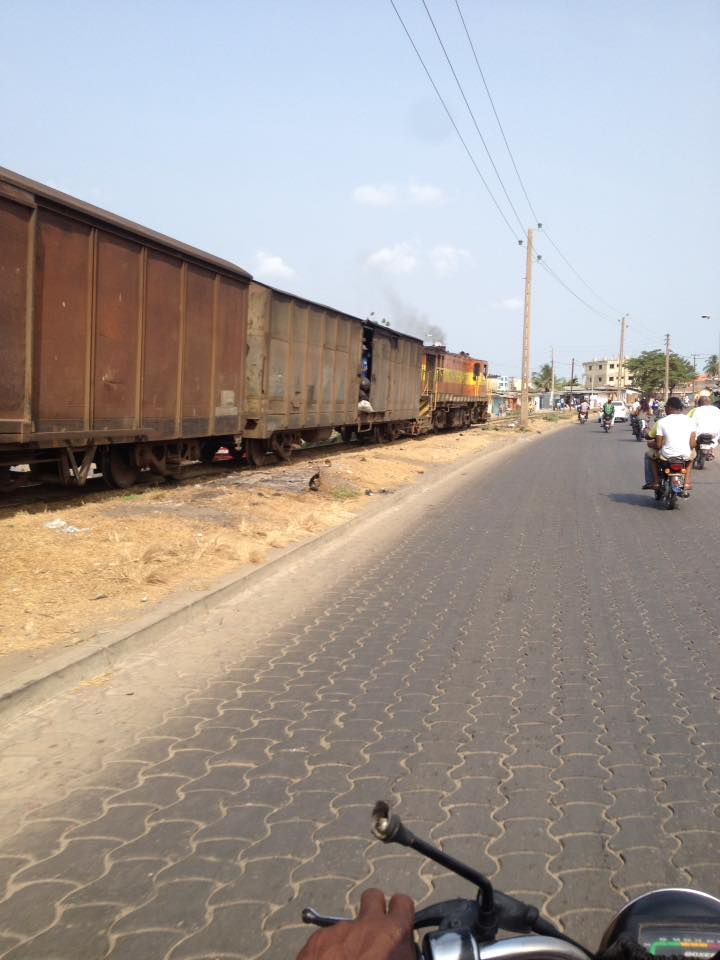
Freight train along the road in Cotonou

Benin has a total of 578 km (359 mi) of single track, 1,000 mm (3 ft 3 3/8 in) metre gauge railway. Benin does not, at this time, share railway links with adjacent countries - Niger possesses no railways to connect to, and while the other surrounding countries, Nigeria, Togo and Burkina Faso, do have railway networks, no connections have been built. In 2006, an Indian proposal appeared, which aims to link the railways of Benin with Niger and Burkina Faso. Benin will be a participant in the AfricaRail project.

== Roads ==
Benin possesses a total of 6,787 km of highway, of which 1,357 km are paved. Of the paved highways in the country, there are 10 expressways. This leaves 5,430 km of unpaved road.

The Trans–West African Coastal Highway crosses Benin, connecting it to Nigeria to the east, and Togo, Ghana and Ivory Coast to the west. When construction in Liberia and Sierra Leone is finished, the highway will continue west to seven other Economic Community of West African States (ECOWAS) nations. A paved highway also connects Benin northwards to Niger, and through that country to Burkina Faso and Mali to the north-west.

With the exception of the road linking Cotonou in the south to Malanville on the border with Niger in the north, and from Parakou in central Benin to Natitingou in the northwestern part of the country, roads in Benin are generally in poor condition and are often impassable during the rainy season. Benin's unpaved roads vary widely in quality; deep sand and potholes are common. During the rainy season from mid-June to mid-September, dirt roads often become impassable. Four-wheel drive vehicles with full spare tires and emergency equipment are recommended.

Most of the main streets in Cotonou are paved, but side streets are often dirt with deep potholes. Traffic moves on the right, as in the United States. Cotonou has no public transportation system; many Beninese people rely on bicycles, mopeds, motorbikes, and zémidjans (moped taxis). Buses and bush taxis offer service in the interior.

Gasoline smuggled from Nigeria is widely available in glass bottles and jugs at informal roadside stands throughout Cotonou and much of the country. This gasoline is of unreliable quality, often containing water or other contaminants that can damage or disable vehicles. There are periodic gas shortages, which can be particularly acute in the north of the country where there are few service stations.

Poorly maintained and overloaded transport and cargo vehicles frequently break down and cause accidents. Drivers often place branches or leaves in the road to indicate a broken down vehicle is in the roadway. Undisciplined drivers move unpredictably through traffic. Construction work is often poorly indicated. Speed bumps, commonly used on paved roads in and near villages, are seldom indicated. Drivers must be on guard against people and livestock wandering into or across the roads. Nighttime driving is particularly hazardous as vehicles frequently lack headlights and/or taillights, and brake lights are often burned out. With few exceptions, Cotonou and other cities lack any street lighting, and lighting on roads between population centers is non-existent. There have been numerous carjackings and robberies on roads in Benin after dark, several of which resulted in murder when the driver refused to comply with the assailants' demands. The National Police periodically conduct vehicle checks at provisional roadblocks in an effort to improve road safety and reduce the increasing number of carjackings.

Road transport in Benin.

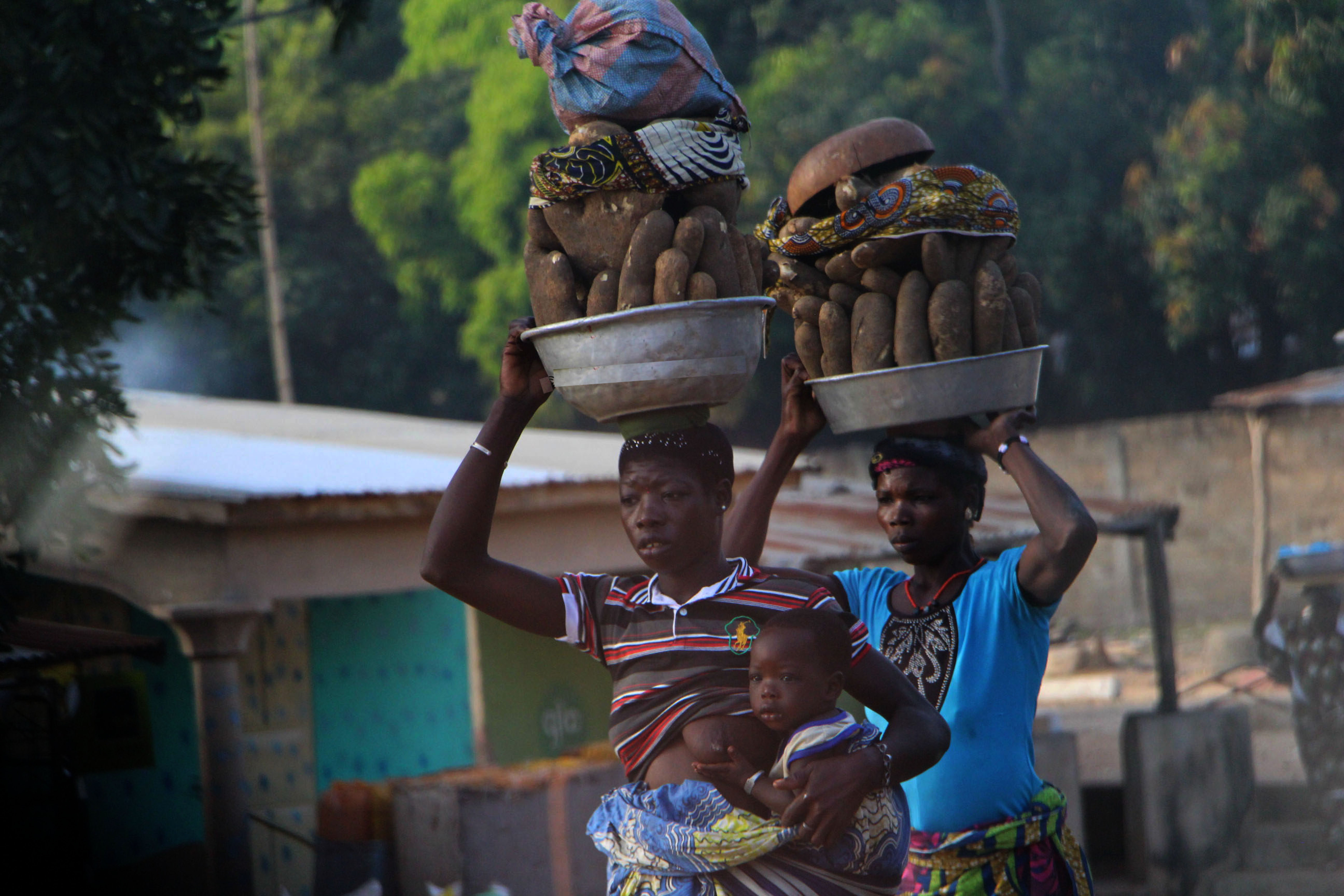
Headcarrying.

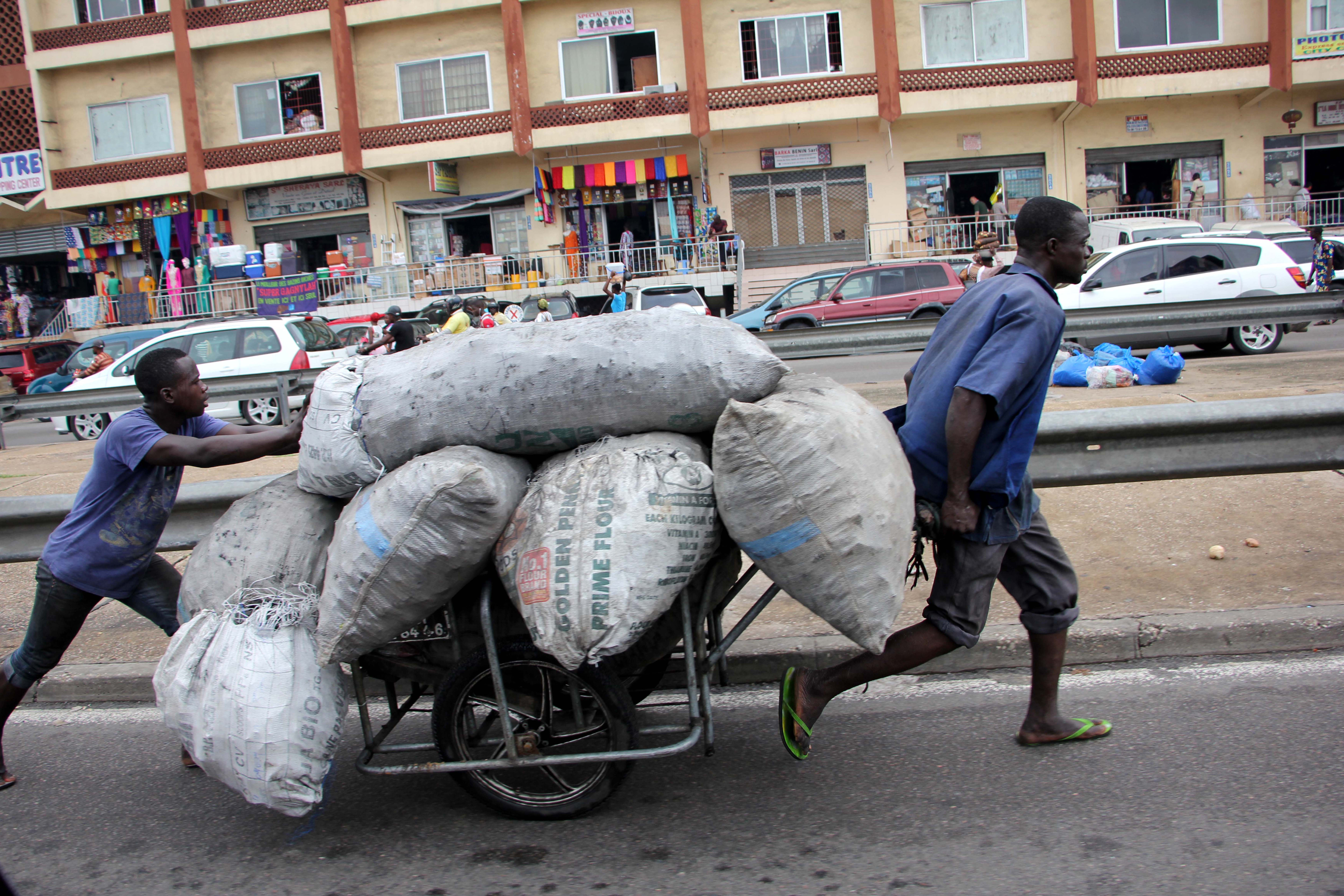
Hand cart.

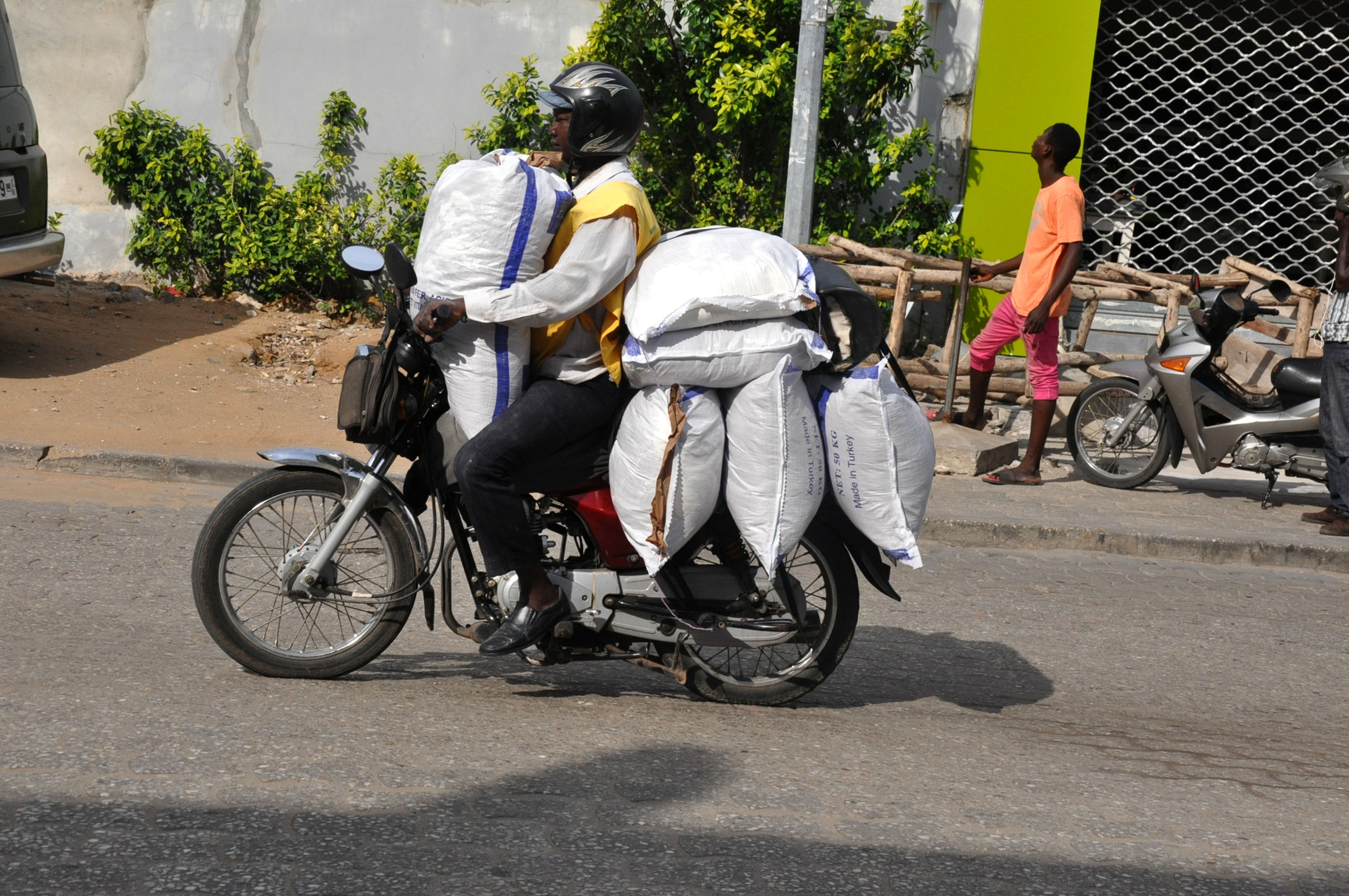
Zemidjan.

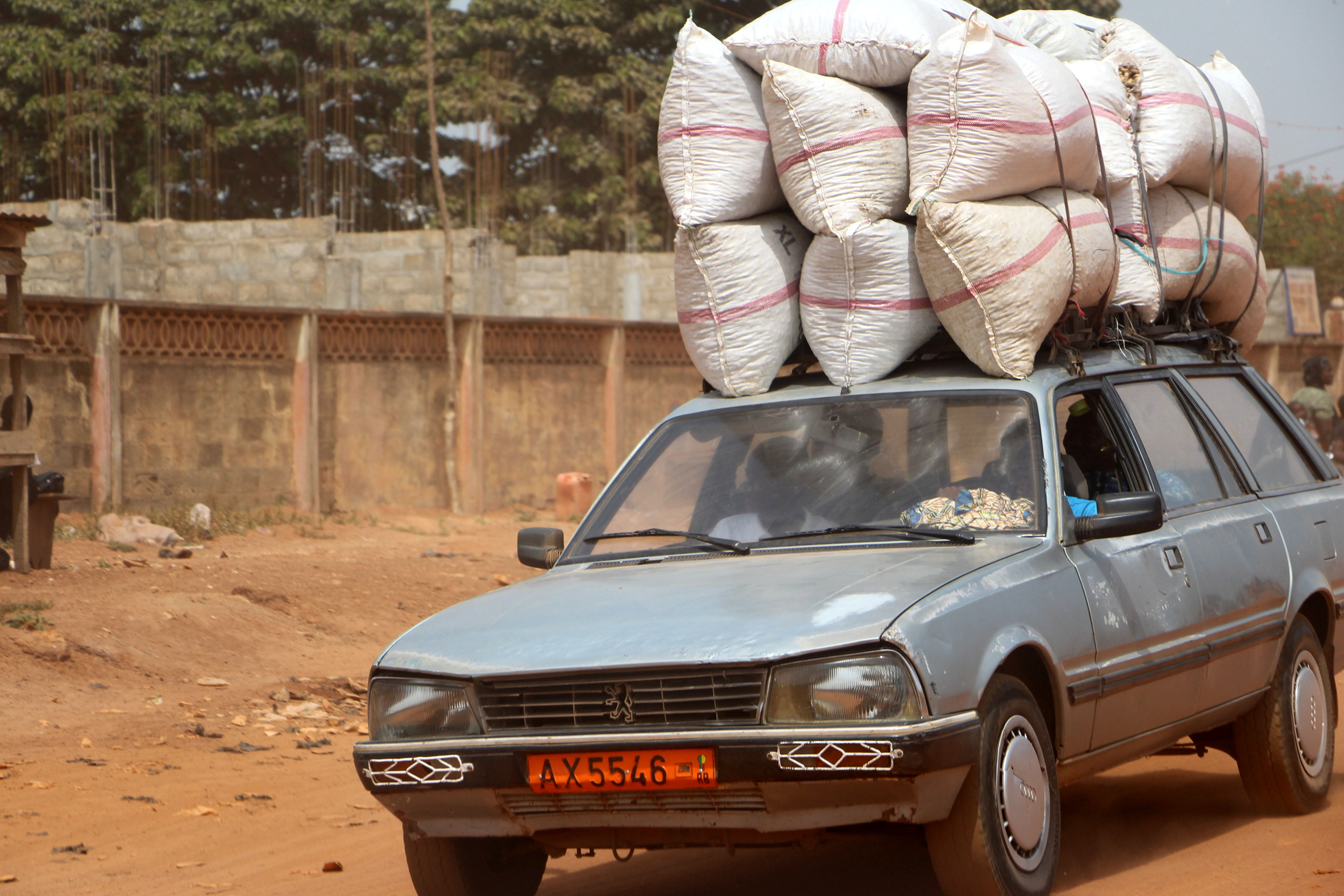
Peugeot automobile.

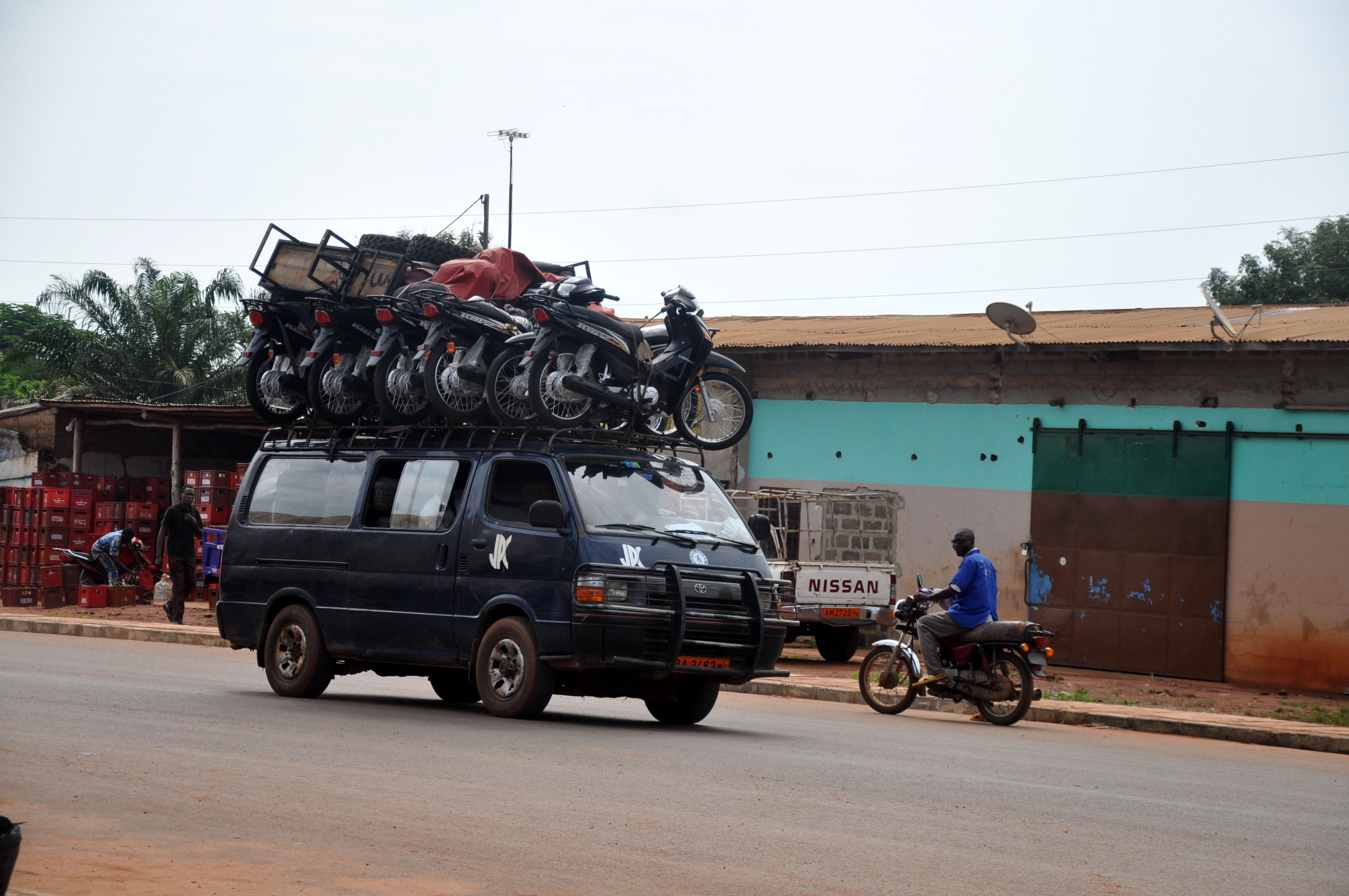
Toyota van.

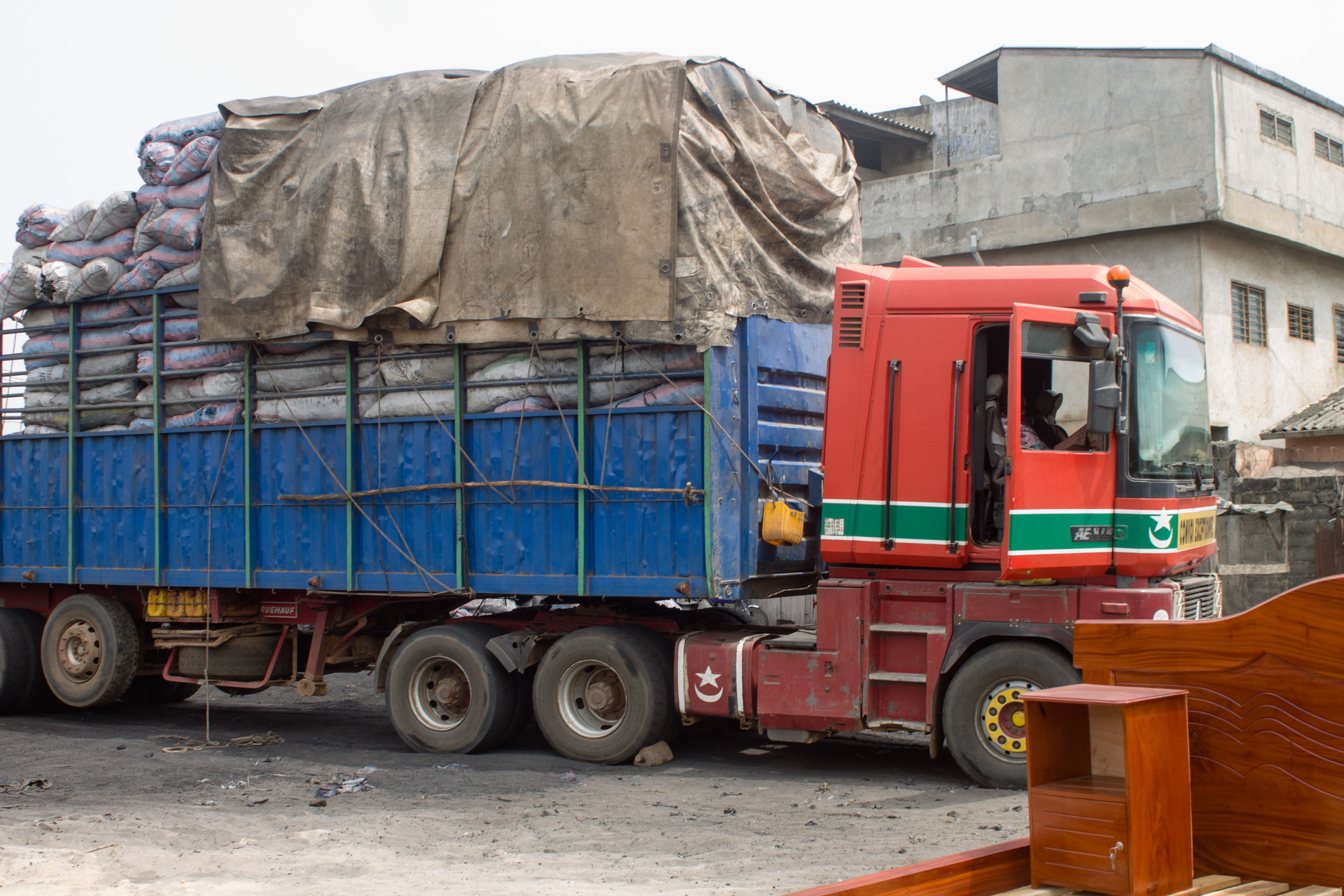
Truck.

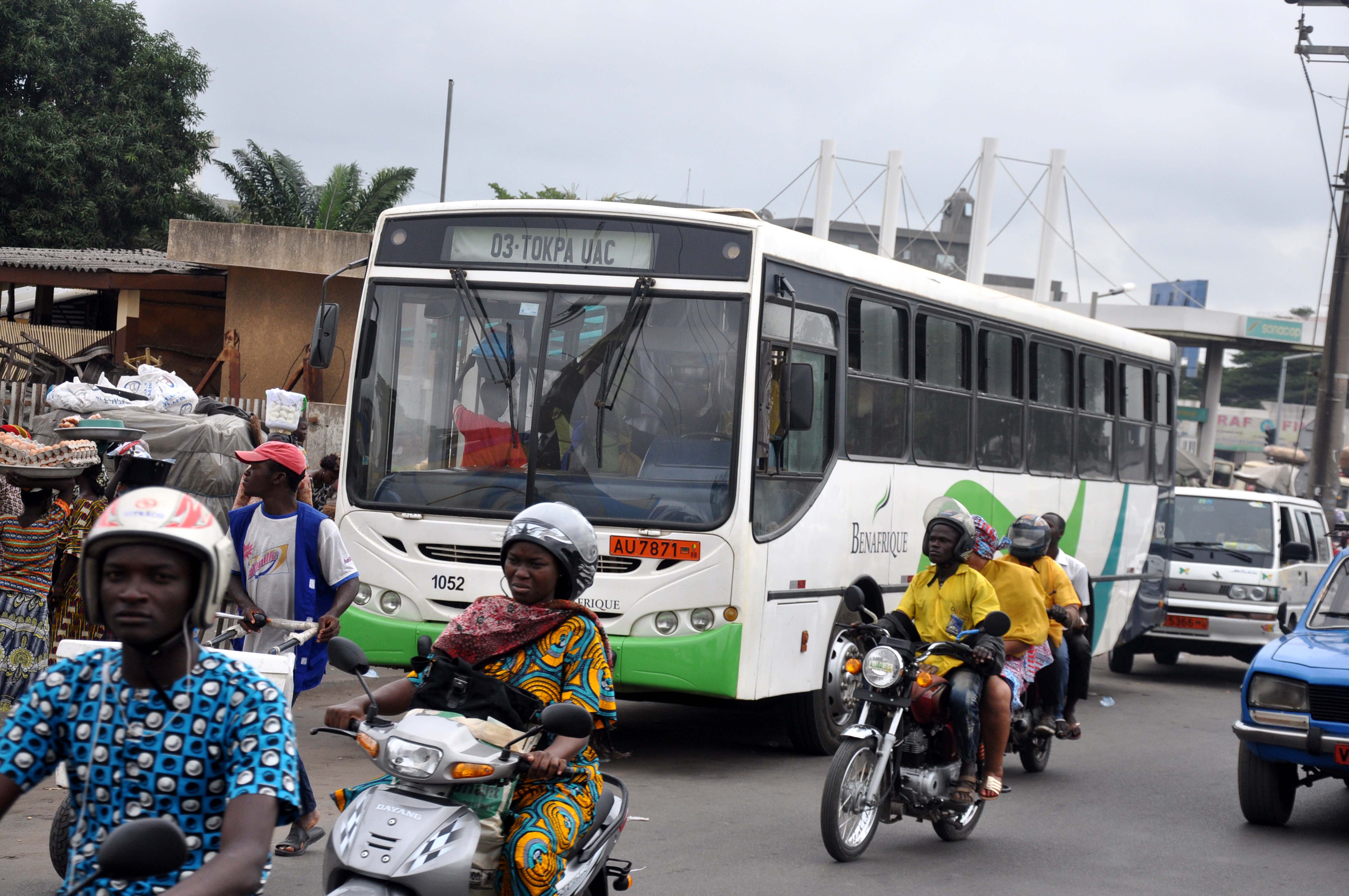
Bus.

== Water ==
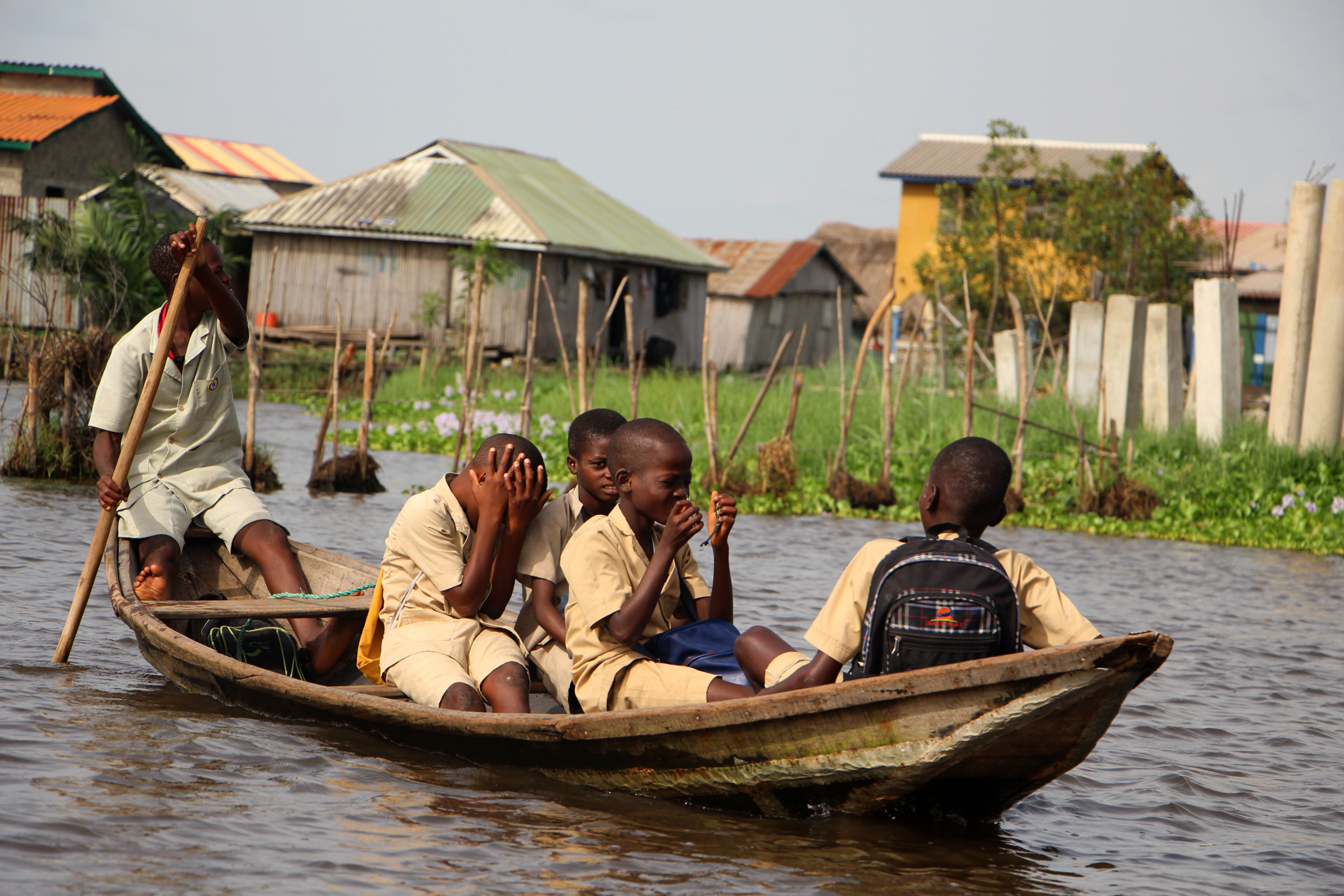
Transport of schoolchildren by pirogue in Ganvié

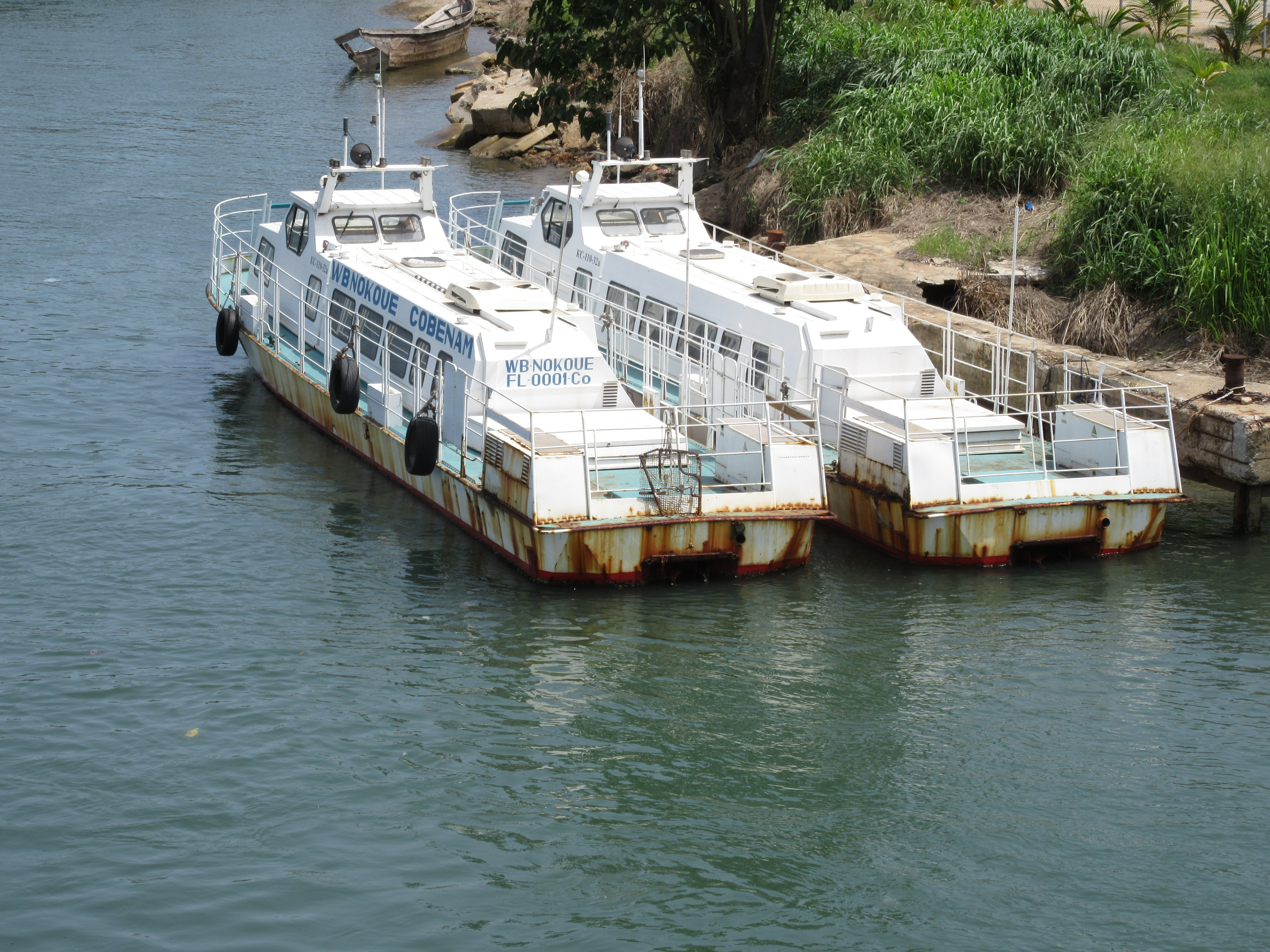
Cobenam boats in Cotonou

Benin's waterways are navigable along small sections, but are only locally important. There are two ports in Benin, Cotonou, a railhead, and Porto-Novo. The country does not have a merchant marine. The Port of Cotonou is a member of the International Association of Ports and Harbors (IAPH).

== Airports ==
The civil aviation authority in Benin is the Agence Nationale de l'Aviation Civile du Bénin (ANAC).

== See also ==
- List of airports in Benin
- Railway stations in Benin
