= Rob Rizzo =

American former NASCAR driver (born 1973)

- Born: June 5, 1973 (age 53)

NASCAR FedEx Freight Truck Series career
- 19 races run over 4 years
- Best finish: 29th - 1997 (Craftsman Truck Series)
- First race: 1996 Parts America 150 (Watkins Glen)
- Last race: 1999 Grainger Industrial Supply 225K (Portland)
Wins	Top tens	Poles
	3

Rob Rizzo (born June 5, 1973) is an American former NASCAR driver. In his career, he scored three top-ten finishes in the Craftsman Truck Series, which was the only national touring series he raced in.

== NASCAR career ==
Rizzo made his debut in 1996, running his own bought Rizzo Racing Ford at Watkins Glen International. He had a top-ten run there, started sixth and finishing seventh. Rizzo qualified for three more races that year, including an 11th place at Infineon Raceway. However, he did not finish the other two races.

Rizzo made a dozen starts in 1997. Once again, he got his best finish of the year in his first start, a 6th-place run at Tucson. However, Rizzo struggled in his other starts, as he only posted three top-20 finishes thereafter.

Rizzo would only make two starts in 1998, as Scot Walters purchased Rizzo's ride. Rizzo, however, ended up with the No. 98 Liberty Racing Ford team. Rizzo struggled in his first race at Homestead-Miami, finishing 30th after a crash. However, in the next race at Watkins Glen, Rizzo managed another top-ten finish. He started and finished eighth in that event.

Rizzo made his final start in 1999, running one race at Portland International Raceway. He struggled, ending up 21st in that event. He has not raced in NASCAR since.

== Marriage ==
Rizzo married actress Natalia Cigliuti in 2004 but in 2013 it was revealed that they had since divorced. They have a son.

== Motorsports career results ==
=== NASCAR ===
(key) (Bold - Pole position awarded by qualifying time. Italics - Pole position earned by points standings or practice time. * – Most laps led.)

==== Craftsman Truck Series ====
NASCAR Craftsman Truck Series results
Year	Team	No.	Make	1	2	3	4	5	6	7	8	9	10	11	12	13	14	15	16	17	18	19	20	21	22	23	24	25	26	27	NCTC	Pts	Ref
1996	RGR Racing	27	Ford	HOM	PHO	POR	EVG	TUS	CNS	HPT	BRI	NZH	MLW	LVL	I70	IRP	FLM	GLN; 7	NSV	RCH	NHA; 22	MAR	NWS	SON; 11	MMR	PHO	LVS; 37				49th	425	
1997	RGR Racing	27	Ford	WDW; DNQ	TUS; 6	HOM; 16	PHO; DNQ	POR; 25	EVG	I70; DNQ	NHA; 39	TEX	BRI; 16	NZH; 30	MLW	LVL	CNS	HPT	IRP; 30	FLM	NSV; 30	GLN; 31	RCH; DNQ	MAR	SON; 23	MMR; 18	CAL; 28	PHO; DNQ	LVS		29th	1306	
1998	Liberty Racing	98	Ford	WDW	HOM; 30	PHO	POR	EVG	I70	GLN; 8	TEX; DNQ	BRI	MLW; DNQ	NZH	CAL	PPR	IRP	NHA	FLM	NSV	HPT	LVL	RCH	MEM	GTY	MAR	SON	MMR	PHO	LVS	52nd	310	
1999	CJ Racing	27	Ford	HOM	PHO	EVG	MMR	MAR	MEM	PPR	I70	BRI	TEX	PIR; 21	GLN	MLW	NSV	NZH	MCH	NHA	IRP	GTY	HPT	RCH	LVS	LVL	TEX	CAL			96th	100	
