= Bob Keselowski =

American racing driver and team owner (1951–2021)

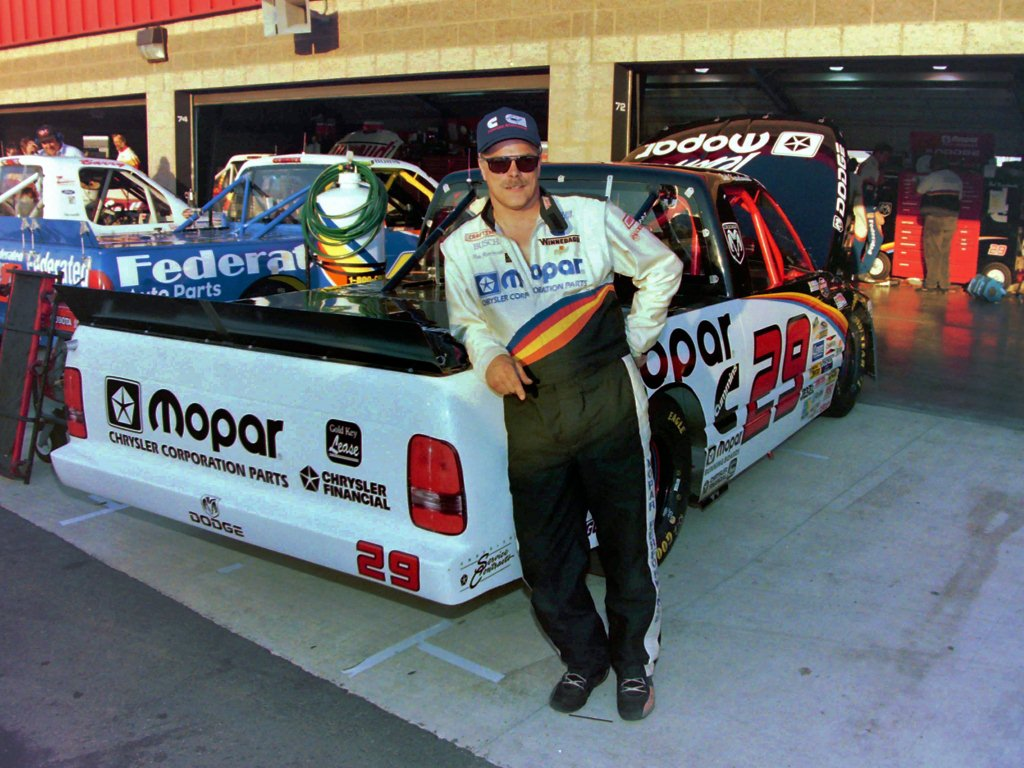
- Keselowski in 1997
- Born: Robert Allen Keselowski; August 1, 1951; Rochester, Michigan, U.S.
- Died: December 22, 2021 (aged 70)
- Achievements: 1989 ARCA Permatex SuperCar Series Champion

NASCAR Cup Series career
- 1 race run over 1 year
- 1994 position: 81st
- Best finish: 81st (1994)
- First race: 1994 UAW-GM Teamwork 500 (Pocono)
Wins	Top tens	Poles
0	0	0

NASCAR FedEx Freight Truck Series career
- 86 races run over 5 years
- 1999 position: 38th
- Best finish: 14th (1997)
- First race: 1995 Copper World Classic (Phoenix)
- Last race: 1999 NAPA Auto Parts 200 (Fontana)
- First win: 1997 Virginia Is For Lovers 200 (Richmond)
Wins	Top tens	Poles
1	15	0
- Statistics up to date as of November 23, 2012.

Robert Allen Keselowski (August 1, 1951 – December 22, 2021) was an American professional stock car racing driver. He owned K Automotive Racing and was a competitor in the ARCA Hooters SuperCar Series and the NASCAR Craftsman Truck Series.

== Racing career ==
In the ARCA Series, Keselowski had 24 wins, 26 poles, and a 1989 championship.

Keselowski was one of the original drivers in the NASCAR Craftsman Truck Series in 1995 when it raced under the name the NASCAR SuperTruck Series. After finishing 15th in the inaugural season, he finished 16th in the second season. Keselowski won his only NASCAR race when he won the 1997 Virginia Is For Lovers 200 at Richmond International Raceway. He competed one more full season and two part-time seasons before his NASCAR career was over.

== Personal life ==
Born to John and Roberta, Bob’s father John, a former motorcycle racer turned owner was Keselowski’s first car owner when he broke into the racing scene. Keselowski's sons Brad and Brian compete in NASCAR. His brother Ron Keselowski raced in NASCAR in the early 1970s and he had been Bob's car owner.

After having had cancer for two years, Keselowski died on December 22, 2021, at the age of 70. Sean Corr ran the No. 29 in the 2022 Lucas Oil 200 in his honor.

== Motorsports career results ==
=== NASCAR ===
(key) (Bold – Pole position awarded by qualifying time. Italics – Pole position earned by points standings or practice time. * – Most laps led.)

==== Winston Cup Series ====
NASCAR Winston Cup Series results
Year	Team	No.	Make	1	2	3	4	5	6	7	8	9	10	11	12	13	14	15	16	17	18	19	20	21	22	23	24	25	26	27	28	29	30	31	NWCC	Pts	Ref
1994	Jimmy Means Racing	52	Ford	DAY	CAR	RCH	ATL	DAR	BRI	NWS	MAR	TAL	SON	CLT	DOV	POC; 41	MCH	DAY	NHA	POC	TAL	IND	GLN	MCH	BRI	DAR	RCH	DOV	MAR	NWS	CLT	CAR	PHO	ATL	81st	40	

==== Craftsman Truck Series ====
NASCAR Craftsman Truck Series results
Year	Team	No.	Make	1	2	3	4	5	6	7	8	9	10	11	12	13	14	15	16	17	18	19	20	21	22	23	24	25	26	27	NCTC	Pts	Ref
1995	K Automotive Racing	29	Dodge	PHO; 22	TUS; 28	SGS; 11	MMR; 7	POR; 11	EVG; 20	I70; 10	LVL; 19	BRI; 10	MLW; 25	CNS	HPT; 29	IRP; 15	FLM	RCH; 29	MAR; 10	NWS; 20	SON	MMR	PHO; 25								15th	1742	
1996	K Automotive Racing	29	Dodge	HOM; 32	PHO; 34	POR; 16	EVG; 16	TUS; 10	CNS; 28	HPT; 27	BRI; 16	NZH; 34	MLW; 13	LVL; 31	I70; 23	IRP; 21	FLM; 18	GLN; 18	NSV; 11	RCH; 33	NHA; 19	MAR; 19	NWS; 24	SON; 17	MMR; 28	PHO; DNQ	LVS; 18				16th	2281	
1997	K Automotive Racing	29	Dodge	WDW; 34	TUS; 22	HOM; 28	PHO; 6	POR; 5	EVG; 6	I70; 27	NHA; 12	TEX; 6	BRI; 31	NZH; 36	MLW; 20	LVL; 24	CNS; 21	HPT; 12	IRP; 16	FLM; 11	NSV; 23	GLN; 15	RCH; 1*	MAR; 28	SON; 13	MMR; 21	CAL; 8	PHO; 17	LVS; 13		14th	2915	
1998	K Automotive Racing	29	Dodge	WDW; 8	HOM; 7	PHO; 32	POR; 13	EVG; 13	I70; 28	GLN; 21	TEX; 29	BRI; 18						NHA; 16	FLM; 11	NSV; 16	HPT; 10	LVL; 24	RCH; 15	MEM	GTY	MAR	SON	MMR	PHO	LVS	26th	1731	
1998	K Automotive Racing	9	Dodge										MLW; 34	NZH	CAL	PPR	IRP														26th	1731	
1999	K Automotive Racing	29	Dodge	HOM; 23	PHO	EVG	MMR	MAR	MEM	PPR	I70	BRI	TEX; 15	PIR	GLN	MLW	NSV	NZH	MCH; 28	NHA	IRP	GTY	HPT	RCH	LVS	LVL	TEX; 9	CAL; 30			38th	507	

=== ARCA Hooters SuperCar Series ===
(key) (Bold – Pole position awarded by qualifying time. Italics – Pole position earned by points standings or practice time. * – Most laps led.)

ARCA Hooters SuperCar Series results
Year	Team	No.	Make	1	2	3	4	5	6	7	8	9	10	11	12	13	14	15	16	17	18	19	20	21	AHSSC	Pts	Ref
1980		19	Dodge	DAY	NWS	FRS	FRS	MCH	TAL	IMS	FRS	MCH; 28													NA	0	
1985	K Automotive Racing	29	Chevy	ATL	DAY	ATL	TAL	ATL	SSP	IRP	CSP	FRS	IRP	OEF	ISF	DSF	TOL; 17								105th	-	
1986	K Automotive Racing	29	Chevy	ATL; 26	DAY; 27	ATL; 40	TAL	SIR; 2	SSP; 11	FRS; 2	KIL; 14	CSP; 25	TAL; 19	BLN; 1	ISF; 20	DSF; 2	TOL; 26	MCS; 21	ATL; 26						10th	1675	
1987	K Automotive Racing	29	Chevy	DAY; 6	ATL; 27	TAL; 9	DEL; 9	**ACS**; 1*	**TOL**; 15	ROC; 11	POC; DNQ	FRS; 5	KIL; 5	TAL; 31	FRS; 24	**ISF**; 1	**INF**; 26	DSF; 2	SLM; 1	ATL; 4					3rd	3605	
1988	K Automotive Racing	29	Chevy	DAY; 42	ATL; 21	TAL; 15	**FRS**; 1	PCS; 7	ROC; 1	POC; 2	WIN; 2	KIL; 5	ACS; 8	SLM; 21	**POC**; 1*	TAL; 37	**DEL**; 23	**FRS**; 5	ISF; 1	DSF; 1	SLM; 15	ATL; 4			2nd	4200	
1989	K Automotive Racing	29	Chevy	DAY; 12	ATL; 14	KIL; 2	TAL; 39		POC; 21				TAL; 8				TOL; 2			ATL; 12					1st	3740	
1989	K Automotive Racing	29	Pontiac					FRS; 7		KIL; 12	HAG; 10	POC; 1		**DEL**; 1*	FRS; 18	ISF; 1*		DSF; 1	SLM; 18						1st	3740	
1990	K Automotive Racing	29	Chevy	DAY; 21			TAL; 8	**FRS**; 3	**POC**; 5*				POC; 25	TAL; 6	MCH; 29*						ATL; 17				2nd	4755	
1990	K Automotive Racing	29	Pontiac		ATL; 5	KIL; 19				KIL; 2	**TOL**; 3	HAG; 13				ISF; 2	TOL; 1	DSF; 28	WIN; 1*	**DEL**; 6					2nd	4755	
1991	K Automotive Racing	29	Chevy	DAY; 29	ATL; 33	KIL; 2	TAL; 6			**POC**; 1*	MCH; 27														3rd	4735	
1991	K Automotive Racing	29	Pontiac					TOL; 20	FRS; 5			**KIL**; 24	FRS; 1	DEL; 1			HPT; 8		ISF; 12		DSF; 30				3rd	4735	
1991	K Automotive Racing	29	Chrysler												POC; 1	TAL; 28		MCH; 5		TOL; 3		TWS; 2*	ATL; 25		3rd	4735	
1992	K Automotive Racing	29	Chrysler	DAY; 6	FIF; 17	TWS; 5	TAL; 9	TOL; 2	**KIL**; 21	**POC**; 31	MCH; 1	**FRS**; 2	KIL; 1	NSH; 8	DEL; 1	**POC**; 1*	HPT; 15	**FRS**; 2*	ISF; 29	**TOL**; 2	DSF; 26	TWS; 23	SLM; 29	ATL; 3	2nd	5635	
1993	K Automotive Racing	29	Chrysler	DAY; 11	FIF; 12		TAL; 6	KIL; 3	CMS; 12	FRS; 20	TOL; 23	POC; 7	MCH; 18	FRS; 5	POC; 28	KIL; 6	ISF; 1	DSF; 5	**TOL**; 3	SLM; 3	WIN; 13	ATL; 24			2nd	4700	
1993	K Automotive Racing	9	Chrysler			TWS; 20																			2nd	4700	
1994	K Automotive Racing	29	Chrysler	DAY; 40	TAL; 40	FIF; 9	LVL; 18	KIL; 4	TOL; 4	FRS; 20	MCH; 31	DMS; 25	POC; 3	POC; 36	**KIL**; 8	FRS; 2	INF; 15*	I70; 2	ISF; 14*	DSF; 5*	TOL; 6	SLM; 20	WIN; 3	ATL; 20	4th	4835	
1995	K Automotive Racing	29	Chrysler	DAY; 43	ATL	TAL	FIF	KIL	FRS	MCH; 10	I80	MCS	FRS	POC	POC	KIL	FRS	SBS	LVL	ISF	DSF	SLM	WIN	ATL	84th	-	

Sporting positions
Preceded by Tracy Leslie	ARCA Series Champion; 1989	Succeeded by Bob Brevak
