= Tobey Butler =

American racing driver (born 1959)

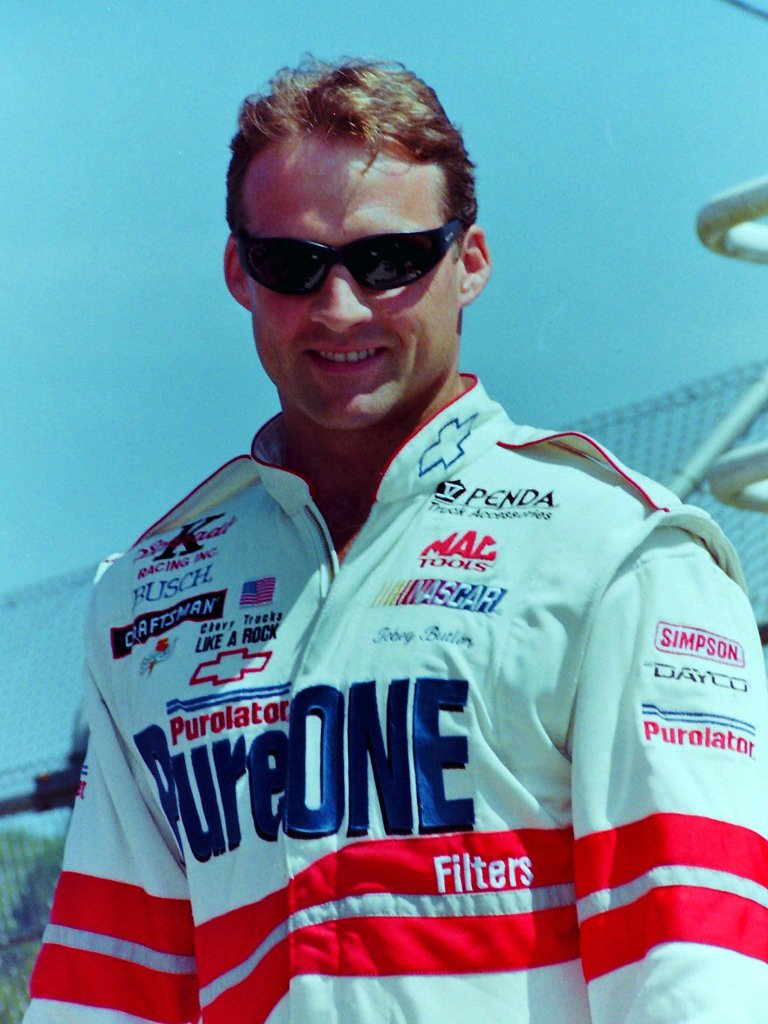
- Butler in 1997
- Born: December 23, 1959 (age 66); Kirkland, Washington, U.S.
- Achievements: 1987 NASCAR Winston Northwest Tour Champion

NASCAR FedEx Freight Truck Series career
- 39 races run over 3 years
- Best finish: 10th (1995)
- First race: 1995 Skoal Bandit Copper World Classic (Phoenix)
- Last race: 1997 GM Goodwrench / Delco 300 (Phoenix)
| Wins | Top tens | Poles |
|---|---|---|
| 0 | 9 | 1 |

Tobey Butler (born December 23, 1959) is an American former NASCAR driver. He finished in the top-ten in points in the inaugural year of the Craftsman Truck Series and then did a limited schedule.

== Career ==
Butler was the 1987 champion of the NASCAR Northwest Series. He has twenty wins, 68 top-fives, 87 top-tens and thirteen pole positions in 116 starts in the series.

Before competing in the inaugural season in the truck series, Butler made one lone attempt to qualify for a Winston Cup series event at Sonoma in 1994 driving for Bill Stroppe Motorsports, but without success. Butler was one of the drivers who participated in the exhibition races the CTS held later that year in preparation for 1995, the series' first full season. Butler signed to drive No. 21 Ortho Ford. He had five top-ten finishes in the twenty race schedule, his best finishes being a pair of fourth places at Louisville and Portland, and finished tenth place in points.

In 1996, Butler was forced out of the No. 21 racetrack and ended up doing a six-race schedule for Ken Schrader's No. 52 team. In his first outing with the team at Evergreen, Butler won his first career pole and went on to finish sixth. In the other five races, he would tack on two more top-ten finishes. A sixth at Phoenix would match the Evergreen run.

Butler moved around in 1997, ending up running for Schrader and the No. 60 TKO Motorsports team. He struggled in the races for Schrader. In ten starts with that team, he only had one top-ten finish: ninth at Portland. This led to his release from the TKO team. In three races with that team, he managed a pair of twelfth place runs. He has not raced in NASCAR since.

== Motorsports career results ==
=== NASCAR ===
(key) (Bold – Pole position awarded by qualifying time. Italics – Pole position earned by points standings or practice time. * – Most laps led.)

==== Winston Cup Series ====
NASCAR Winston Cup Series results
| Year | Team | No. | Make | 1 | 2 | 3 | 4 | 5 | 6 | 7 | 8 | 9 | 10 | 11 | 12 | 13 | 14 | 15 | 16 | 17 | 18 | 19 | 20 | 21 | 22 | 23 | 24 | 25 | 26 | 27 | 28 | 29 | 30 | 31 | NWCC | Pts | Ref |
|---|---|---|---|---|---|---|---|---|---|---|---|---|---|---|---|---|---|---|---|---|---|---|---|---|---|---|---|---|---|---|---|---|---|---|---|---|---|
| 1994 | Bill Stroppe Motorsports | 38 | Ford | DAY | CAR | RCH | ATL | DAR | BRI | NWS | MAR | TAL | SON; DNQ | CLT | DOV | POC | MCH | DAY | NHA | POC | TAL | IND | GLN | MCH | BRI | DAR | RCH | DOV | MAR | NWS | CLT | CAR | PHO | ATL | N/A | - | |

==== Craftsman Truck Series ====
NASCAR Craftsman Truck Series results
| Year | Team | No. | Make | 1 | 2 | 3 | 4 | 5 | 6 | 7 | 8 | 9 | 10 | 11 | 12 | 13 | 14 | 15 | 16 | 17 | 18 | 19 | 20 | 21 | 22 | 23 | 24 | 25 | 26 | NCTC | Pts | Ref |
|---|---|---|---|---|---|---|---|---|---|---|---|---|---|---|---|---|---|---|---|---|---|---|---|---|---|---|---|---|---|---|---|---|
| 1995 | Venable Racing | 21 | Ford | PHO; 25 | TUS; 17 | SGS; 8 | MMR; 13 | POR; 4 | EVG; 18 | I70; 11 | LVL; 4 | BRI; 11 | MLW; 28 | CNS; 13 | HPT; 16 | IRP; 29 | FLM; 8 | RCH; 20 | MAR; 33 | NWS; 15 | SON; 5 | MMR; 13 | PHO; 20 | | | | | | | 10th | 2358 | |
| 1996 | Ken Schrader Racing | 52 | Chevy | HOM | PHO | POR | **EVG**; 6 | TUS | CNS | HPT | BRI | NZH | MLW | LVL | I70 | IRP | FLM | GLN | NSV | RCH; 10 | NHA | MAR | NWS; 14 | SON | MMR; 31 | PHO; 6 | LVS; 34 | | | 36th | 686 | |
| 1997 | Ken Schrader Racing | 52 | Chevy | WDW; DNQ | TUS; DNQ | HOM; 20 | PHO; 18 | POR; 9 | EVG; 11 | I70; 29 | NHA; 27 | TEX; 18 | BRI; 35 | NZH; 34 | MLW | LVL | CNS | HPT | IRP | FLM | | | | | | | | | | 27th | 1355 | |
| 1997 | Brevak Racing | 34 | Ford | WDW; 20 | | | | | | | | | | | | | | | | | | | | | | | | | | 27th | 1355 | |
| 1997 | TKO Motorsports | 60 | Chevy | | | | | | | | | | | | | | | | | | NSV; 12 | GLN | RCH; 35 | MAR | SON | MMR | CAL | PHO; 12 | LVS; DNQ | 27th | 1355 | |

Sporting positions
| Preceded by Ron Eaton | NASCAR Winston Northwest Tour; 1987 | Succeeded by Ron Eaton |
