= Joe Bean (racing driver) =

American racing driver (born 1962)

- Born: July 11, 1962 (age 64); San Diego, California, U.S.

NASCAR FedEx Freight Truck Series career
- 2 races run over 1 year
- Best finish: 66th (1997)
- First race: 1997 Kragen / Exide 151 (Sonoma)
- Last race: 1997 Dodge California Truckstop 300 (Mesa Marin)
Wins	Top tens	Poles
0	1	0

ARCA Menards Series West career
- 54 races run over 7 years
- Best finish: 3rd (1999)
- First race: 1995 Valvoline / Checker 200 (Sonoma)
- Last race: 2001 Jani-King 250 Presented by NAPA (Irwindale)
- First win: 1996 Carquest Auto Parts 250 (Mesa Marin)
- Last win: 2000 Home Depot 250 (Irwindale)
Wins	Top tens	Poles
2	25	0
- Statistics up to date as of November 17, 2024.

Joe Bean (born July 11, 1962) is an American former professional stock car racing driver who has competed in the NASCAR Craftsman Truck Series and the NASCAR Winston West Series.

Bean has also previously competed in the NASCAR Southwest Series, the ASA Truck Series, and the Copper World Classic.

== Motorsports results ==
=== NASCAR ===
(key) (Bold - Pole position awarded by qualifying time. Italics - Pole position earned by points standings or practice time. * – Most laps led.)

==== Winston Cup Series ====
NASCAR Winston Cup Series results
Year	Team	No.	Make	1	2	3	4	5	6	7	8	9	10	11	12	13	14	15	16	17	18	19	20	21	22	23	24	25	26	27	28	29	30	31	NWCC	Pts	Ref
1996	Bean & Krebs Motorsports	03	Ford	DAY	CAR	RCH	ATL	DAR	BRI	NWS	MAR	TAL	SON; DNQ	CLT	DOV	POC	MCH	DAY	NHA	POC	TAL	IND	GLN	MCH	BRI	DAR	RCH	DOV	MAR	NWS	CLT	CAR			N/A	0	
1996	Bean & Krebs Motorsports	03	Chevy																														PHO; DNQ	ATL	N/A	0	

==== Busch Series ====
NASCAR Busch Series results
Year	Team	No.	Make	1	2	3	4	5	6	7	8	9	10	11	12	13	14	15	16	17	18	19	20	21	22	23	24	25	26	27	28	29	30	NBSC	Pts	Ref
1997	Joe Bean	03	Chevy	DAY	CAR	RCH	ATL	LVS; DNQ	DAR	HCY	TEX	BRI	NSV	TAL	NHA	NZH	CLT	DOV	SBO	GLN	MLW	MYB	GTY	IRP	MCH	BRI	DAR	RCH	DOV	CLT	CAL	CAR	HOM	N/A	0	

==== Craftsman Truck Series ====
NASCAR Craftsman Truck Series results
Year	Team	No.	Make	1	2	3	4	5	6	7	8	9	10	11	12	13	14	15	16	17	18	19	20	21	22	23	24	25	26	NCTC	Pts	Ref
1997	Dollar Motorsports	46	Ford	WDW	TUS	HOM	PHO	POR	EVG	I70	NHA	TEX	BRI	NZH	MLW	LVL	CNS	HPT	IRP	FLM	NSV	GLN	RCH	MAR	SON; 9	MMR; 24	CAL; DNQ	PHO	LVS; DNQ	66th	276	

==== Winston West Series ====
NASCAR Winston West Series results
Year	Team	No.	Make	1	2	3	4	5	6	7	8	9	10	11	12	13	14	15	NWWSC	Pts	Ref
1995	N/A	93	Chevy	TUS	MMR	SON	CNS	MMR	POR	SGS	TUS	AMP	MAD	POR	LVS	SON; 5	MMR; 12	PHO	32nd	282	
1996	Bean & Krebs Motorsports	3	Chevy	TUS; 22	AMP; 11	MMR; 9		MAD; 12	POR; 10	TUS; 5	EVG; 19	CNS; 8	MAD; 10	MMR; 1	SON; 15	MMR; 12		LVS; 25	7th	1789	
1996	Bean & Krebs Motorsports	03	Chevy				SON; DNQ										PHO; DNQ		7th	1789	
1997	Raymond Claridge	7	Pontiac	TUS; 18	AMP	SON	TUS	MMR	LVS	CAL	EVG	POR	PPR	AMP	SON	MMR	LVS		66th	109	
1998	N/A	11	Ford	TUS	LVS	PHO	CAL	HPT	MMR	AMP	POR	CAL; 31	PPR	EVG					50th	207	
1998	N/A	67	Ford												SON; 17	MMR			50th	207	
1998	N/A	97	Ford														LVS; DNQ		50th	207	
1999	Performance P-1 Motorsports	77	Ford	TUS; 9	LVS; 13	PHO; 21	CAL; 8	PPR; 9	MMR; 9	IRW; 21	EVG; 5	POR; 10	IRW; 4	RMR; 11	LVS; 5	MMR; 3	MOT; 7		3rd	1955	
2000	Performance P-1 Motorsports	77	Ford	PHO; 16	MMR; 3	LVS; 16	CAL; 20	LAG; 10	IRW; 22	POR; 22	EVG; 12	IRW; 1	RMR; 14	MMR; 4	IRW; 5				9th	1579	
2001	Performance P-1 Motorsports	77	Ford	PHO; 9	LVS; 11	TUS; 17	MMR; 6	CAL; 27	IRW	LAG	KAN	EVG	CNS; 4	IRW; 22	RMR; 19	LVS; 25	IRW; 15		17th	1186	
