= Tammy Jo Kirk =

American stock car racing driver and motorcycle racer

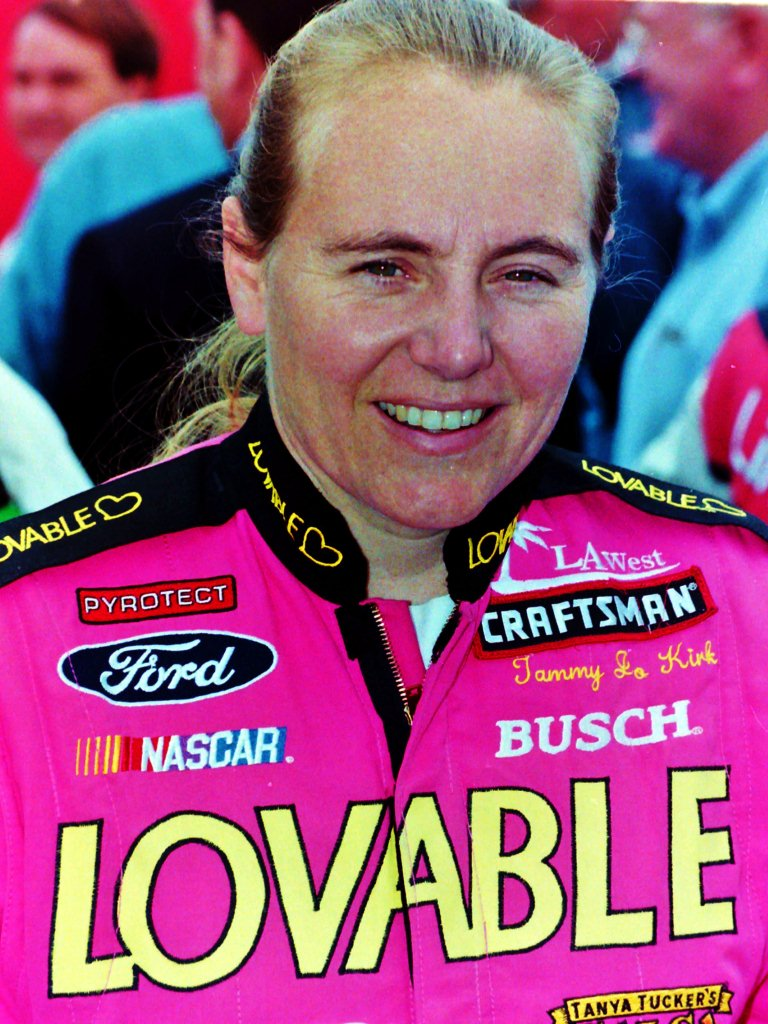
- Kirk in 1997
- Born: May 6, 1962 (age 64); Dalton, Georgia, U.S.
- Achievements: 1994 Snowball Derby Winner

NASCAR O'Reilly Auto Parts Series career
- 15 races run over 1 year
- Best finish: 45th (2003)
- First race: 2003 New England 200 (New Hampshire)
- Last race: 2003 Ford 300 (Homestead)
Wins	Top tens	Poles
0	0	0

NASCAR FedEx Freight Truck Series career
- 32 races run over 2 years
- Best finish: 20th (1997)
- First race: 1997 Chevy Trucks Challenge (Disney)
- Last race: 1998 Sam's Town 250 (Las Vegas)
Wins	Top tens	Poles
0	0	0

Tammy Jo Kirk (born May 6, 1962) is an American stock car racing and motorcycle racer. She was the first woman to race in the NASCAR Craftsman Truck Series and later returned to NASCAR to run the Busch Series. She has not driven in NASCAR since 2003.

== Early career ==
Kirk began her racing career in motorcycles at the age of nine, moving up through the ranks of the sport during her teenage years and finally reaching the peak of the sport, the A.M.A. Grand National Championship. She became the first woman in history to reach a Grand National Championship final when she earned a spot in the 1983 Knoxville Half Mile event. In 1986, she made history by winning a Class C flat track race in Knoxville, Tennessee.

After Kirk retired from motorcycle racing due to frustration about the refusal of companies to provide spare parts to a female competitor, she moved on to late model racing in 1989. Kirk joined the NASCAR Winston All-American Challenge Series in 1991, becoming the first female driver to compete in the series. In 1994, she was named the Most Popular Driver in the series, which had been renamed the Slim Jim All Pro Series, and would finish seventh in series points two years later. Kirk became the second woman to win a NASCAR touring series event (the first being Shawna Robinson in 1988, in the Goody's Dash Series) when she won the 1994 Snowball Derby, which was at the time a points race in the All Pro Series.

== Craftsman Trucks & Busch Series ==
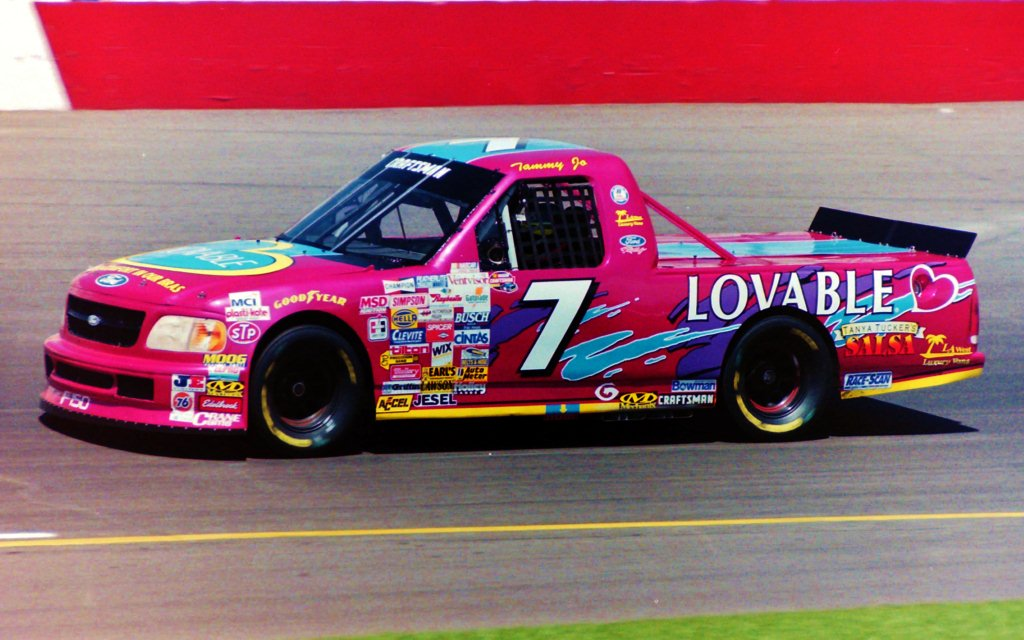
Kirk's 1997 truck

In 1997, Kirk made the next big step as she moved to the NASCAR Craftsman Truck Series. She signed with Geoff Bodine Racing with Loveable, a lingerie company, as the sponsor of her No. 7 Ford F-150; the sponsorship was reported to be worth US$1.2 million. She made her debut in 1997 at the Walt Disney World Speedway, qualifying 9th and finishing 24th; she was the first female driver to compete in the series. Two races later at Portland Speedway, she qualified third. Her best finish that year was an 11th at Heartland Park Topeka. After the Federated Auto Parts 250, she was released, but was able to run one race apiece with MacDonald Motorsports and Circle Bar Racing. The race with Circle Bar came to a premature end when Kirk became uneasy in the driver's seat, claiming the pillows she was sitting on made it feel like she was "falling out of the seat" in the turns. When the season was over, she had run 19 of 26 races and had finished seventh in the Rookie of the Year chase.

For 1998, Kirk started her own team. Unfortunately, she only made thirteen starts because of a lack of sponsors for her No. 51 Ford. The season was marked with six DNF's. Her best finish that year was 13th at Bristol. She finished 29th in points that year. Despite her best efforts, she still did not acquire any sponsors, and she shut down her team in 1999. She would not race in the Truck Series again; her best career finish in the series was 11th, at Heartland Park Topeka in 1997.

In 2003, Kirk returned to NASCAR, driving the No. 49 Advil Ford Taurus for Jay Robinson Racing in the Busch Series. In 15 races, her best finish was 21st at the Trim Spa Dream Body 250. After the season was over, she was released from the ride; she retired from racing, and currently works as a motorcycle dealer in her hometown of Dalton.

== Motorsports career results ==
=== NASCAR ===
(key) (Bold – Pole position awarded by qualifying time. Italics – Pole position earned by points standings or practice time. * – Most laps led.)

==== Busch Series ====
NASCAR Busch Series results
Year	Team	No.	Make	1	2	3	4	5	6	7	8	9	10	11	12	13	14	15	16	17	18	19	20	21	22	23	24	25	26	27	28	29	30	31	32	33	34	NBSC	Pts	Ref
2003	Jay Robinson Racing	49	Ford	DAY	CAR	LVS	DAR	BRI	TEX	TAL	NSH	CAL	RCH	GTY	NZH	CLT	DOV	NSH	KEN	MLW	DAY	CHI	NHA; 34	PPR; 21	IRP; 29	MCH; 39	BRI; 37	DAR; 25	RCH; 22	DOV; 24	KAN; 33	CLT; 27	MEM; 28	ATL; 35	PHO; 33	CAR; 32	HOM; 32	45th	1062	

==== Craftsman Truck Series ====
NASCAR Craftsman Truck Series results
Year	Team	No.	Make	1	2	3	4	5	6	7	8	9	10	11	12	13	14	15	16	17	18	19	20	21	22	23	24	25	26	27	NCTC	Pts	Ref
1997	Geoff Bodine Racing	07	Ford	WDW; 24	TUS; DNQ																NSV; 14										20th	2174	
1997	Geoff Bodine Racing	7	Ford			HOM; 23	PHO; 12	POR; 14	EVG; 16	I70; 25	NHA; 13	TEX; 13	BRI; 19	NZH; 16	MLW; 16	LVL; 14	CNS; 17	HPT; 11	IRP; 34	FLM; 19											20th	2174	
1997	MacDonald Motorsports	72	Chevy																			GLN; DNQ	RCH; 30	MAR; DNQ	SON	MMR					20th	2174	
1997	Circle Bar Racing	74	Ford																								CAL; 35	PHO			20th	2174	
1997	RGR Racing	27	Ford																										LVS; DNQ		20th	2174	
1998	Kirk Motorsports	51	Ford	WDW; 17	HOM; 15	PHO	POR	EVG	I70; 19	GLN	TEX; 15	BRI; 13	MLW; DNQ	NZH; 16	CAL; 32	PPR; 34	IRP; 31	NHA; 34	FLM	NSV; 26	HPT	LVL	RCH; DNQ	MEM; 21	GTY	MAR	SON	MMR	PHO	LVS; 36	29th	1296	

Achievements
Preceded by Bobby Gill	Snowball Derby Winner; 1994	Succeeded by Jeff Purvis
