= Rick Crawford (racing driver) =

American stock car racing driver

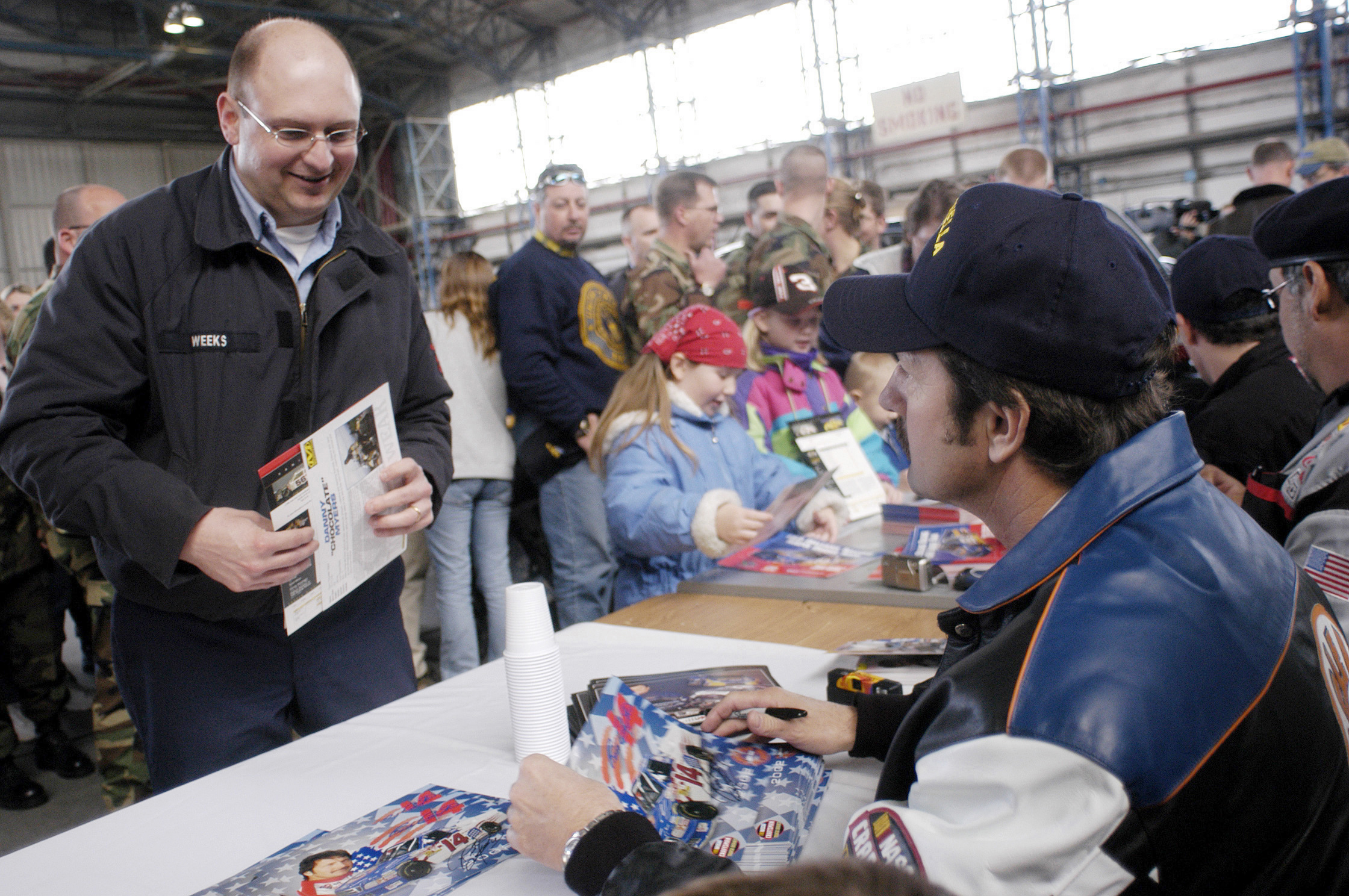
- Crawford (right) during a visit to Naval Air Station Sigonella in 2003
- Born: Richard Hoyt Crawford Jr. July 26, 1958 (age 68); Mobile, Alabama, U.S.
- Achievements: 1989 Snowball Derby Winner

NASCAR O'Reilly Auto Parts Series career
- 2 races run over 2 years
- 2012 position: 139th
- Best finish: 134th (2011)
- First race: 2011 STP 300 (Chicagoland)
- Last race: 2012 Food City 250 (Bristol)
Wins	Top tens	Poles
0	0	0

NASCAR FedEx Freight Truck Series career
- 336 races run over 16 years
- 2013 position: 119th
- Best finish: 2nd (2002)
- First race: 1997 Chevy Trucks Challenge (Orlando)
- Last race: 2012 Fred's 250 (Talladega)
- First win: 1998 Florida Dodge Dealers 400 (Homestead)
- Last win: 2006 Power Stroke Diesel 200 (IRP)
Wins	Top tens	Poles
5	160	6
- Statistics up to date as of February 25, 2013.

Richard Hoyt Crawford Jr. (born July 26, 1958) is an American former professional stock car racing driver and convicted child sex offender. Crawford competed in the Craftsman Truck Series full-time from 1997 to 2009. He is the former promoter and manager of Mobile International Speedway.

== Early career ==
Crawford began his racing career as a short-track racer in the southeastern United States. He won the 1989 running of the prestigious annual short track Snowball Derby race. He also won the track championship at Five Flags Speedway in 1981 and 1984, and won the championship at Mobile International Speedway in 1981, 1982, and 1984. After that, he moved to the Slim Jim All Pro Series, where he collected sixty-one top tens, and earned five victories. In 1993 and 1994, he attempted four Winston Cup Series races in the No. 84, but did not qualify for any of them.

== Truck Series ==
In 1997, Crawford moved to the Craftsman Truck Series with his Circle Bar team. He qualified for every race, had ten top-tens, a top-five at Texas Motor Speedway and finished twelfth in the points. He was also runner-up to Kenny Irwin Jr. for the NASCAR Craftsman Truck Series Rookie of the Year. The next season, he picked up his first career win at Homestead-Miami Speedway. The team struggled to find consistency, with only five top-ten finishes and he dropped to eighteenth in the standings. Crawford started 1999 with two consecutive top-tens, but only wound up fourteenth in the points, scoring ten top-tens and four top fives.

In 2001, Crawford finished eighth in points, his first top-ten points finish, he would earn sixteen top tens and ten top fives. The 2002 season would prove to be Crawford's most successful, although winless for the season he had seventeen top-ten finishes, a career high twelve top-five finishes, two poles (at Dover and Phoenix), and finished second in the standings only 46 points behind champion Mike Bliss. 2003 saw him grab his second victory, at the Florida Dodge Dealers 250, in a memorable three-wide race to finish line at Daytona International Speedway. He finished the season seventh in points with 16 top tens and ten top-fives.

In 2004, in his first race after a massive crash at Atlanta Motor Speedway, in which Tina Gordon and Hank Parker Jr. were also involved, Crawford picked up a win at Martinsville Speedway. He would finish the season with nine top-tens and four top-fives, and fell to twelfth in points. Despite a win at Loudon in 2005, Crawford finished seventeenth in points, mainly due to missing the first race of his Truck career after suffering injuries, ironically while practicing for the Built Ford Tough 225. Boris Said, who was scheduled to be a guest on the Speed Channel's race coverage, was hired to drive the truck. While he wrecked later in the race, he returned to the booth to cover the rest of the race, as the late Neil Bonnett once did at Talladega Superspeedway in 1993 after taking a wild ride into the tri-oval. He did score two poles at Atlanta and Martinsville and had eleven top-tens and three top-fives.

For the 2006 season, Crawford had five top-fives and thirteen top-ten finishes including a win on August 4 at O'Reilly Raceway Park, finishing 9th in the final standings, the win at O’Reilly was his final career victory. Rick had a consistent year in 2007 racking up eleven top-five finishes, eighteen top-tens and a near win at Mansfield Motorsports Park en route to a fifth place standing in the points championship. The eighteen top ten finishes would be a career high to date. In 2008 Crawford put together another solid season with thirteen top tens and seven top fives and a pole at Texas. He would end the season seventh in points. In 2009, now at the age of fifty, Crawford would again finish in the top ten in points at tenth. He scored seven top tens and three top fives and would win the pole at Martinsville for the second time in his career.

Crawford would start the 2010 season with a great deal of uncertainty. Longtime sponsor Circle Bar Motel and RV Park would cut back their sponsorship of the team dramatically and Crawford stated that he was unsure how many races they would be able to run without a new sponsor. He would run the first four races of the season with Circle Bar, scoring two top tens. However, prior to Kansas Crawford announced that he would not race for Circle Bar in the No. 14 truck and would instead race in the Ray Hackett Racing No. 76 truck with sponsorship from SUPERSEAL Construction Products. This would be the first race in his record 327 Camping World Truck Series starts that he would not be in the No. 14 and would not be racing under Circle Bar Racing. Crawford would qualify for that race fifteenth and finish 31st after an accident going for the lead. In August, Crawford would take yet another unfamiliar step in his career as he would join forces with Tagsby Racing to race in the EnjoyIllinois.com 225 at Chicagoland Speedway. This would be the first race in his career that he would race in a Chevrolet truck. Crawford would earn his third top-ten finish in six races with an eighth place finish in the race. He ran in two more races with Tagsby to close out the season.

Crawford attempted to race with Tagsby Racing and make his twelfth consecutive start in the season opening race at Daytona in 2011, but failed to qualify. Before 2011, Crawford was one of only three drivers to compete in all Camping World Truck Series races at Daytona.

Crawford is a former manager and promoter of Mobile International Raceway, and attempted the 2012 season-opening race at Daytona with Tagsby Racing. He would race with Mike Harmon Racing's No. 74 truck at Martinsville, finishing last. He would race two more races with Tagsby Racing in 2012 at Texas and Chicagoland, finishing 29th and eleventh respectively. At Talladega later that year, he raced for BRG Motorsports. This was the first time he would race in a Toyota truck. In 2013, he attempted Daytona with MAKE Motorsports, but failed to qualify. After that, Crawford would stop racing for good.

Crawford raced in 210 consecutive races before missing the 2005 Built Ford Tough 225 race at Kentucky due to injuries sustained from a hard crash in practice. He had not missed a race since that date until failing to qualify at Daytona in February 2011. Prior to 2011, Crawford was one of the few drivers in the history of the sport with more than fifty starts who has never raced in any major series in NASCAR other than the Truck Series. However, that statistic was ended in 2011, when Crawford made his Nationwide Series debut driving for Jennifer Jo Cobb Racing at Chicagoland Speedway. He would then race his second and last Nationwide Series race with Mike Harmon Racing at Bristol in 2012.

== Post-racing career ==
In March 2011 Crawford entered a multi-year contract to be the promoter and manager at Mobile International Speedway, his home track, in Irvington (Mobile), Alabama.

In March 2014 it was announced that Crawford would serve as crew chief for Team Stange Racing and driver Maryeve Dufault in the ARCA Racing Series.

=== 2018 arrest ===
On March 1, 2018, Crawford was arrested in Florida; he was charged for "attempted enticement of a minor", after being caught in an online undercover sting operation involving a Seminole County, Florida Sheriff's deputy working for an FBI sex crimes task force posing as a father offering commercial sexual exploitation of his nonexistent 12 year old daughter in exchange for cash. Crawford later pled not guilty to the charge and was released into the custody of his family until his trial. Crawford was convicted by a jury on August 30, 2018. On November 26, 2018, Crawford was sentenced to 10 years and 10 months in federal prison, a sentence that was later upheld on appeal in 2020.

== Motorsports career results ==
=== NASCAR ===
(key) (Bold – Pole position awarded by qualifying time. Italics – Pole position earned by points standings or practice time. * – Most laps led.)

==== Winston Cup Series ====
NASCAR Winston Cup Series results
Year	Team	No.	Make	1	2	3	4	5	6	7	8	9	10	11	12	13	14	15	16	17	18	19	20	21	22	23	24	25	26	27	28	29	30	31	NWCC	Pts	Ref
1993	Circle Bar Racing	84	Ford	DAY	CAR	RCH	ATL; DNQ	DAR	BRI	NWS	MAR	TAL	SON	CLT; DNQ	DOV	POC	MCH	DAY	NHA	POC	TAL	GLN	MCH	BRI	DAR	RCH	DOV	MAR	NWS	CLT	CAR	PHO	ATL; DNQ		NA	-	
1994	Circle Bar Racing	84	Ford	DAY; Wth	CAR	RCH	ATL	DAR	BRI	NWS	MAR	TAL	SON	CLT	DOV	POC	MCH	DAY	NHA	POC	TAL	IND	GLN	MCH	BRI	DAR	RCH	DOV	MAR	NWS	CLT	CAR	PHO	ATL	NA	-	

===== Daytona 500 =====
Year	Team	Manufacturer	Start	Finish
1994	Circle Bar Racing	Ford	Wth	

==== Nationwide Series ====
NASCAR Nationwide Series results
Year	Team	No.	Make	1	2	3	4	5	6	7	8	9	10	11	12	13	14	15	16	17	18	19	20	21	22	23	24	25	26	27	28	29	30	31	32	33	34	NNSC	Pts	Ref
2011	JJC Racing	13	Ford	DAY	PHO	LVS	BRI	CAL	TEX	TAL	NSH	RCH	DAR	DOV	IOW	CLT	CHI; 36	MCH	ROA	DAY	KEN	NHA	NSH	IRP	IOW	GLN	CGV	BRI	ATL	RCH	CHI	DOV	KAN	CLT	TEX	PHO	HOM	134th	0^{1}	
2012	Mike Harmon Racing	74	Chevy	DAY	PHO	LVS	BRI	CAL	TEX	RCH	TAL	DAR	IOW	CLT	DOV	MCH	ROA	KEN	DAY	NHA	CHI	IND	IOW	GLN	CGV	BRI; 36	ATL	RCH	CHI	KEN	DOV	CLT	KAN	TEX	PHO	HOM		139th	0^{1}	

==== Camping World Truck Series ====
NASCAR Camping World Truck Series results
Year	Team	No.	Make	1	2	3	4	5	6	7	8	9	10	11	12	13	14	15	16	17	18	19	20	21	22	23	24	25	26	27	NCWTC	Pts	Ref
1997	Circle Bar Racing	14	Ford	WDW; 11	TUS; 12	HOM; 18	PHO; 21	POR; 8	EVG; 23	I70; 15	NHA; 6	TEX; 3	BRI; 6	NZH; 18	MLW; 34	LVL; 16	CNS; 6	HPT; 8	IRP; 13	FLM; 15	NSV; 8	GLN; 14	RCH; 34	MAR; 24	SON; 25	MMR; 6	CAL; 10	PHO; 13	LVS; 10		12th	3149	
1998	Circle Bar Racing	14	Ford	WDW; 29	HOM; 1	PHO; 5	POR; 27	EVG; 21	I70; 18	GLN; 14	TEX; 26	BRI; 38	MLW; 26	NZH; 29	CAL; 15	PPR; 11	IRP; 34	NHA; 22	FLM; 15	NSV; 3	HPT; 15	LVL; 25	RCH; 11	MEM; 5	GTY; 7	MAR; 15	SON; 29	MMR; 27	PHO; 16	LVS; 14	18th	2956	
1999	Circle Bar Racing	14	Ford	HOM; 8	PHO; 6	EVG; 12	MMR; 22	MAR; 33	MEM; 22	PPR; 8	I70; 27	BRI; 21	TEX; 12	PIR; 16	GLN; 10	MLW; 3	NSV; 14	NZH; 17	MCH; 29	NHA; 5	IRP; 12	GTY; 9	HPT; 4	RCH; 12	LVS; 8	LVL; 7	TEX; 23	CAL; 35			14th	3018	
2000	Circle Bar Racing	14	Ford	DAY; 34	HOM; 7	PHO; 10	MMR; 9	MAR; 15	PIR; 5	GTY; 12	MEM; 6	PPR; 13	EVG; 14	TEX; 8	KEN; 10	GLN; 9	MLW; 14	NHA; 13	NZH; 13	MCH; 7	IRP; 31	NSV; 10	CIC; 28	RCH; 16	DOV; 3	TEX; 6	CAL; 12				11th	3053	
2001	Circle Bar Racing	14	Ford	DAY; 10	HOM; 8	MMR; 19	MAR; 7	GTY; 4	DAR; 4	PPR; 9	DOV; 14*	TEX; 20	MEM; 16	MLW; 25	KAN; 8	KEN; 27	NHA; 27	IRP; 6	NSH; 3	CIC; 5*	NZH; 4	RCH; 5	SBO; 24	TEX; 2	LVS; 5	PHO; 3	CAL; 2*				8th	3320	
2002	Circle Bar Racing	14	Ford	DAY; 24	DAR; 5	MAR; 3	GTY; 4	PPR; 6	**DOV**; 3	TEX; 4	MEM; 9	MLW; 14	KAN; 12*	KEN; 4	NHA; 17	MCH; 9	IRP; 11	NSH; 2	RCH; 4	TEX; 4*	SBO; 3	LVS; 6	CAL; 5	**PHO**; 3	HOM; 7						2nd	3313	
2003	Circle Bar Racing	14	Ford	DAY; 1*	DAR; 7	MMR; 6	MAR; 6	CLT; 3	DOV; 8*	TEX; 14	MEM; 11	MLW; 3	KAN; 23	KEN; 11	GTW; 5	MCH; 12	IRP; 14	NSH; 3	BRI; 3	RCH; 6	NHA; 18	CAL; 4	LVS; 36	SBO; 5	TEX; 9	MAR; 4	PHO; 11	HOM; 2			7th	3578	
2004	Circle Bar Racing	14	Ford	DAY; 4	ATL; 34	MAR; 1	MFD; 7	CLT; 7	DOV; 2	TEX; 15	MEM; 19	MLW; 9	KAN; 3	KEN; 16	GTW; 25	MCH; 32	IRP; 8	NSH; 24	BRI; 17	RCH; 24	NHA; 25	LVS; 11	CAL; 12	TEX; 7	MAR; 16	PHO; 11	DAR; 18	HOM; 28			12th	3030	
2005	Circle Bar Racing	14	Ford	DAY; 36	CAL; 14	**ATL**; 29*	MAR; 21	GTY; 5	MFD; 6	CLT; 25	DOV; 11	TEX; 19	MCH; 6	MLW; 8	KAN; 10	KEN; INQ^{†}	MEM; 11	IRP; 6	NSH; 10	BRI; 21	RCH; 28	NHA; 1	LVS; 7	**MAR**; 16	ATL; 32	TEX; 8	PHO; 4	HOM; 27			16th	2917	
2006	Circle Bar Racing	14	Ford	DAY; 8	CAL; 8	ATL; 10	MAR; 26	GTY; 24	CLT; 11	MFD; 12	DOV; 8	TEX; 3	MCH; 6	MLW; 9	KAN; 2	KEN; 2	MEM; 13	IRP; 1*	NSH; 28	BRI; 13	NHA; 7	LVS; 14	TAL; 15	MAR; 9	ATL; 5	TEX; 33	PHO; 33	HOM; 15			9th	3252	
2007	Circle Bar Racing	14	Ford	DAY; 10	CAL; 9	ATL; 4	MAR; 3	KAN; 2	CLT; 10	MFD; 23*	DOV; 23	TEX; 3	MCH; 6	MLW; 5	MEM; 28	KEN; 30	IRP; 4	NSH; 6	BRI; 5	GTW; 11	NHA; 6	LVS; 9	TAL; 2	MAR; 5	ATL; 12	TEX; 5	PHO; 12	HOM; 3			5th	3523	
2008	Circle Bar Racing	14	Ford	DAY; 5	CAL; 14	ATL; 11	MAR; 3	KAN; 9	CLT; 5	MFD; 13	DOV; 9	TEX; 21	MCH; 11	MLW; 8	MEM; 4	KEN; 14	IRP; 12	NSH; 23	BRI; 5	GTW; 8	NHA; 5	LVS; 6	TAL; 28	MAR; 3	ATL; 12	**TEX**; 11	PHO; 9	HOM; 33			7th	3315	
2009	Circle Bar Racing	14	Ford	DAY; 21	CAL; 14	ATL; 16	**MAR**; 5	KAN; 14	CLT; 11	DOV; 19	TEX; 5	MCH; 12	MLW; 12	MEM; 11	KEN; 17	IRP; 11	NSH; 7	BRI; 19	CHI; 4	IOW; 17	GTW; 10	NHA; 10	LVS; 11	MAR; 15	TAL; 21	TEX; 10	PHO; 14	HOM; 17			10th	3161	
2010	Circle Bar Racing	14	Ford	DAY; 28	ATL; 9	MAR; 19	NSH; 10																								32nd	848	
2010	Ray Hackett Racing	76	Ford					KAN; 31	DOV	CLT	TEX	MCH	IOW	GTY	IRP	POC	NSH	DAR	BRI												32nd	848	
2010	Tagsby Racing	73	Chevy																	CHI; 8	KEN	NHA	LVS; 32	MAR	TAL	TEX; 17	PHO	HOM			32nd	848	
2011	Tagsby Racing	73	Chevy	DAY; DNQ	PHO; DNQ	DAR	MAR	NSH	DOV	CLT	KAN	TEX	KEN	IOW	NSH	IRP	POC	MCH	BRI	ATL	CHI	NHA	KEN	LVS	TAL	MAR	TEX; 24	HOM			66th	20	
2012	Tagsby Racing	73	Chevy	DAY; 25						TEX; 29	KEN	IOW	CHI; 11	POC	MCH	BRI	ATL	IOW	KEN	LVS											41st	96	
2012	Mike Harmon Racing	74	Chevy		MAR; 36	CAR	KAN	CLT	DOV																						41st	96	
2012	BRG Motorsports	20	Toyota																		TAL; 23	MAR	TEX	PHO	HOM						41st	96	
2013	MAKE Motorsports	50	Chevy	DAY; DNQ	MAR	CAR	KAN	CLT	DOV	TEX	KEN	IOW	ELD	POC	MCH	BRI	MSP	IOW	CHI	LVS	TAL	MAR	TEX	PHO	HOM						NA	-	
^{†} - Qualified but replaced by Boris Said

==== Whelen Euro Series - Elite 1 ====
NASCAR Whelen Euro Series - Elite 1 results
Year	Team	No.	Make	1	2	3	4	5	6	7	8	9	10	11	12	NWES	Pts	Ref
2013	Scorpus Racing	19	Chevy	NOG	NOG	DIJ	DIJ	BRH	BRH	TOU; 17	TOU; 7	MNZ	MNZ	BUG	BUG	33rd	-	

Achievements
Preceded by Ted Musgrave	Snowball Derby Winner; 1989	Succeeded by Rich Bickle
