= Bob Brevak =

American racing driver (born 1947)

- Born: March 28, 1947 (age 79); Ashland, Wisconsin, U.S.

NASCAR O'Reilly Auto Parts Series career
- 3 races run over 3 years
- Best finish: 77th (1984)
- First race: 1984 Red Carpet 200 (Milwaukee)
- Last race: 1994 Havoline 250 (Milwaukee)
Wins	Top tens	Poles
0	0	0

NASCAR FedEx Freight Truck Series career
- 36 races run over 3 years
- Best finish: 15th (1996)
- First race: 1995 Ford Credit 200 (Louisville)
- Last race: 1997 Chevy Desert Star Classic (Phoenix)
Wins	Top tens	Poles
0	0	0

Bob Brevak (born March 28, 1947) is an American professional stock car racing driver. He was the champion of the ARCA RE/MAX Series in 1990.

== Racing career ==
Brevak began racing in the United States Auto Club (USAC)'s stock car series between 1972 and 1983. He earned his first USAC Stock Car pole position at the Ozark Empire Fairgrounds in 1979. He earned his second pole at Winchester Speedway in 1981. While competing in USAC, he began racing in Automobile Racing Club of America (ARCA) events in 1982 including some events run under dual sanction plus a few American Speed Association (ASA) events. He continued to compete in ARCA until 1995.

Brevak made 37 NASCAR Craftsman Truck Series starts between the series' first season in 1995 and 1997. He had three Busch Series starts (one each in 1984, 1993, and 1994). His best career finish was an 11th-place finish at Homestead in 1996.

After he retired from racing, Brevak co-owned the No. 31 Craftsman Truck Series ride with his wife.

== Motorsports career results ==
=== NASCAR ===
(key) (Bold – Pole position awarded by qualifying time. Italics – Pole position earned by points standings or practice time. * – Most laps led.)

==== Winston Cup Series ====
NASCAR Winston Cup Series results
Year	Team	No.	Make	1	2	3	4	5	6	7	8	9	10	11	12	13	14	15	16	17	18	19	20	21	22	23	24	25	26	27	28	29	30	31	NWCC	Pts	Ref
1994	Brevak Racing	34	Ford	DAY; DNQ	CAR	RCH	ATL	DAR	BRI	NWS	MAR	TAL	SON	CLT	DOV	POC	MCH; DNQ	DAY	NHA	POC	TAL	IND; DNQ	GLN	MCH; DNQ	BRI	DAR	RCH	DOV	MAR	NWS	CLT	CAR	PHO	ATL; DNQ	NA	-	

===== Daytona 500 =====
Year	Team	Manufacturer	Start	Finish
1994	Brevak Racing	Ford	DNQ	

==== Busch Series ====
NASCAR Busch Series results
Year	Team	No.	Make	1	2	3	4	5	6	7	8	9	10	11	12	13	14	15	16	17	18	19	20	21	22	23	24	25	26	27	28	29	NBGNC	Pts	Ref
1984	Brevak Racing	48	Pontiac	DAY	RCH	CAR	HCY	MAR	DAR	ROU	NSV	LGY	MLW; 13	DOV	CLT	SBO	HCY	ROU	SBO	ROU	HCY	IRP	LGY	SBO	BRI	DAR	RCH	NWS	CLT	HCY	CAR	MAR	77th	124	
1985	Brevak Racing	34	Pontiac	DAY	CAR	HCY	BRI	MAR	DAR	SBO	LGY	DOV	CLT	SBO	HCY	ROU	IRP; DNQ	SBO	LGY	HCY	MLW	BRI	DAR	RCH	NWS	ROU	CLT	HCY	CAR	MAR			NA	-	
1993	Brevak Racing	43	Chevy	DAY	CAR	RCH	DAR	BRI	HCY	ROU	MAR	NZH	CLT	DOV	MYB	GLN	MLW; 31	TAL	IRP	MCH	NHA	BRI	DAR	RCH	DOV	ROU	CLT	MAR	CAR	HCY	ATL		100th	70	
1994	Brevak Racing	3	Chevy	DAY	CAR	RCH	ATL	MAR	DAR	HCY	BRI	ROU	NHA	NZH	CLT	DOV	MYB	GLN	MLW; 31	SBO	TAL	HCY	IRP	MCH	BRI	DAR	RCH	DOV	CLT	MAR	CAR		93rd	70	

==== Craftsman Truck Series ====
NASCAR Craftsman Truck Series results
Year	Team	No.	Make	1	2	3	4	5	6	7	8	9	10	11	12	13	14	15	16	17	18	19	20	21	22	23	24	25	26	NCTC	Pts	Ref
1995	Brevak Racing	34	Ford	PHO	TUS	SGS	MMR	POR	EVG	I70	LVL; 18	BRI; 18	MLW; 24				FLM; 12	RCH; 23	MAR; 17											25th	1146	
1995	Brevak Racing	4	Ford											CNS; 24	HPT; 20	IRP; 20						MMR; 12	PHO; 28							25th	1146	
1995	Brevak Racing	42	Ford																	NWS; DNQ	SON									25th	1146	
1996	Brevak Racing	31	Ford	HOM; 11	PHO; 13	POR; 26	EVG; 18	TUS; 24	CNS; 14	HPT; 20	BRI; 24	NZH; 26	MLW; 15	LVL; 22	I70; 21	IRP; 19	FLM; 21	GLN; 21	NSV; 15	RCH; 28	NHA; 18	MAR; 25	NWS; 28	SON; 19	MMR; 23	PHO; 32	LVS; 25			15th	2388	
1997	Brevak Racing	34	Ford	WDW; QL^{†}	TUS; QL^{†}	HOM; DNQ	PHO; 35	POR	EVG	I70	NHA	TEX	BRI	NZH	MLW	LVL	CNS	HPT	IRP	FLM	NSV	GLN	RCH	MAR	SON	MMR	CAL	PHO	LVS	112th	87	
^{†} - Replaced himself with Tobey Butler at Walt Disney World, and with Tony Roper at Tucson

=== ARCA Hooters SuperCar Series ===
(key) (Bold – Pole position awarded by qualifying time. Italics – Pole position earned by points standings or practice time. * – Most laps led.)

ARCA Hooters SuperCar Series results
Year	Team	No.	Make	1	2	3	4	5	6	7	8	9	10	11	12	13	14	15	16	17	18	19	20	21	AHSSC	Pts	Ref
1982	Brevak Racing	82	Olds	NSV	DAY; 23	TAL; 23	FRS	CMS				TAL; 22													11th	740	
1982	Brevak Racing	82	Pontiac						WIN; 6	NSV; 7	TAT; 9		FRS; 6	BFS; 8	MIL; 2	SND; 5									11th	740	
1983	Brevak Racing	82	Olds	DAY; 9		TAL; 24	LPR	LPR	ISF	IRP	SSP	FRS	BFS												10th	1240	
1983	Brevak Racing	82	Pontiac		NSV; 6									WIN; 9	LPR; 9	POC; 7	TAL; 5	MCS; 6	FRS	MIL; 7	DSF; 18	ZAN; 11	SND; 10		10th	1240	
1984	Brevak Racing	34	Pontiac	DAY; 6	ATL; 12	TAL; 21	CSP; 6	SMS; 5	FRS; 11	MCS; 18	LCS; 10	IRP; 4	TAL; 7	FRS; 5	ISF; 21	DSF; 4	TOL; 5	MGR; 4							4th	2160	
1985	Brevak Racing	34	Pontiac	ATL	DAY; 5	ATL; 4	TAL; 9	ATL; 8	**SSP**; 13	IRP; DNQ	CSP; 19	FRS; 2	IRP; 7	OEF; 3	ISF; 14	DSF; 4	TOL; 7								4th	2285	
1986	Brevak Racing	34	Pontiac	ATL; 6																					6th	2270	
1986	Brevak Racing	34	Buick		DAY; 34	ATL; 37	TAL; 23	SIR; 3	**SSP**; 1*	FRS; 21	KIL; 7	CSP; 19	TAL; 24	BLN; 5	ISF; 2	DSF; 6	TOL; 7	MCS; 22	ATL; 4						6th	2270	
1987	Brevak Racing	34	Buick	DAY; 38	ATL; 28	TAL; 27	DEL; 18	ACS; 10	TOL; 8	ROC; 20	POC; 9	FRS; 26	KIL; 9	TAL; 4	FRS; 8	ISF; 4	INF; 32	DSF; 33	SLM; 22	ATL; 6					8th	2675	
1988	Brevak Racing	34	Buick	DAY; 36	ATL; 28	TAL; 6	FRS	PCS	ROC	POC	WIN	KIL	ACS	SLM; 4	POC	TAL; 26	DEL	FRS	ISF; 3	DSF; 2	SLM; 1	ATL; 39			19th	1485	
1989	Brevak Racing	34	Buick	DAY; 6	ATL; 12	KIL; 6	TAL; 20	FRS; 2	POC; 9	KIL; 10	HAG; 1	POC; 5	TAL; 7	DEL; 9	FRS; 6	ISF; 6	TOL; 15	DSF; 11	SLM; 2	ATL; 24					2nd	3675	
1990	Brevak Racing	34	Buick	DAY; 9	ATL; 3	KIL; 4	TAL; 16	FRS; 2	POC; 6	KIL; 4	TOL; 5	HAG; 3	POC; 5	TAL; 10	MCH; 6	**ISF**; 1*	TOL; 5	DSF; 1*	WIN; 3	DEL; 3	ATL; 29				1st	4995	
1991	Brevak Racing	34	Buick	DAY; 40	ATL; 6	KIL; 4	TAL; 11	TOL; 18	FRS; 3	POC; 4	MCH; 14	KIL; 13	FRS; 5	DEL; 8	POC; 12	TAL; 15	HPT; 14	MCH; 31	ISF; 18	TOL; 7	DSF; 21	TWS; 9	ATL; 42		6th	4390	
1992	Brevak Racing	34	Buick	DAY; 8	FIF; 2	TWS; 13	TAL; 13	TOL; 21	KIL; 10	POC; 28	MCH; 38	FRS; 5	KIL; 19	NSH; 26	DEL				**ISF**; 36	TOL	DSF; 35		SLM; 2		11th	3350	
1992	Brevak Racing	34	Olds													POC; 17	HPT	FRS				TWS; 12		ATL; 13	11th	3350	
1993	Brevak Racing	34	Ford	DAY; 23			TAL; 3					POC; 5	MCH; 15		POC; 6							ATL; 27			6th	4455	
1993	Brevak Racing	34	Buick		FIF; 9			KIL; 4	CMS; 8	FRS; 4	TOL; 18			FRS; 6		KIL; 9	ISF; 33	DSF; 8	TOL; 11	SLM; 7	WIN; 21				6th	4455	
1993	Brevak Racing	34	Olds			TWS; 10																			6th	4455	
1994	Brevak Racing	34	Ford	DAY; 21	TAL; 10	FIF	LVL	KIL	TOL	FRS	MCH	DMS	POC; 17	POC; 23	KIL	FRS									NA	0	
1994	Brevak Racing	34	Olds														INF; 30	I70	ISF	DSF	TOL	SLM	WIN	ATL	NA	0	
1995	Brevak Racing	34	Ford	DAY; 39	ATL	TAL	FIF	KIL	FRS	MCH; 33	I80	MCS	FRS	POC	POC	KIL	FRS	SBS	LVL	ISF	DSF	SLM	WIN	ATL	NA	0	

Sporting positions
Preceded by Bob Keselowski	ARCA Series Champion; 1990	Succeeded by Bill Venturini
