= Circle Bar Racing =

Former American stock car racing team

- Owner: Tom Mitchell
- Base: North Carolina
- Series: Craftsman Truck Series
- Race drivers: Rick Crawford; David Starr; Brendan Gaughan; James Buescher
- Manufacturer: Ford
- Opened: 1978
- Closed: 2010

Career
- Drivers' Championships: 0
- Race victories: 5

Circle Bar Racing was an auto racing team that competed in the NASCAR Camping World Truck Series from 1997 to 2010. The team was most notable for its relationship with Ford Motor Company as well as its long-time driver, Rick Crawford.

== Beginnings ==
Although Mitchell's team has found its home in NASCAR, the team originated in 1978 with Circle Bar sponsoring Chet Fillip in late models. The team officially started out as Circle Bar Auto Racing Inc., with Fillip as their driver. The team qualified for the 1982 Indianapolis 500, finishing 24th in a Gurney Eagle with a Cosworth power plant. Fillip also qualified for the 1983 Indianapolis 500 before DNQ-ing for the 1985 Indy 500 with a Lola chassis. The next week at Milwaukee, the team finished 10th with Fillip. CBR made its NASCAR debut with Fillip in 1985, in the No. 31 Circle Bar Truck Corral Ford at Atlanta. Fillip ran sixteen races for Mitchell in 1986, and had a best finish of twelfth in the No. 81. At the end of the year, Mitchell sold his equipment to Fillip. Afterwards, Circle Bar sponsored the late model efforts of John Kelly in 1989, with the shop based in San Antonio, Texas. Moving to Ozona, the team picked up the championship in 1990. The next year, CBR moved to the All-Pro Series with Kelly, but Alabama native Rick Crawford took his place in 1992. Together, they attempted the 1993 Coca-Cola 600, but failed to qualify. Using Circle Bar's equipment, Crawford had great success in the All-Pro Series, beginning a partnership between Mitchell and Crawford to race in the series until 1996.

== Camping World Truck Series ==
=== No. 10 Truck History ===
Circle Bar Racing fielded a second truck for the first time in 1997, when Tammy Jo Kirk drove the No. 74 at Fontana, as a start and park "field filler"; she finished 35th, parking after ten laps. The next attempt came in 2004, when Greg Biffle drove the No. 44 Ford Racing truck to an eighth-place finish at the Ford 200.

CBR added on the No. 10 Truck in 2007, with David Starr behind the wheel. Picking up both Navistar International sponsorship and the owners points of ppc Racing's old Truck Series team, the team had a moderately successful year, finishing 10th in points in their first year. Starr left at the end of the season to return to Red Horse Racing. Brendan Gaughan took over the No. 10 truck in 2008, leaving his defunct family owned team South Point Racing. Gaughan earned two top fives and five top tens and finished 15th in points. At the end of the season, Gaughan departed the team, and rookie driver James Buescher was signed to the 10 truck full-time in 2009 with Jamie Jones as his crew chief. Buescher had three top-tens and a fourteenth-place points finish but departed the team as well at the end of the year. The team was eventually sold to Jennifer Jo Cobb.

==== Truck No. 10 results ====
Year	Driver	No.	Make	1	2	3	4	5	6	7	8	9	10	11	12	13	14	15	16	17	18	19	20	21	22	23	24	25	26	Owners	Pts
1997	Tammy Jo Kirk	74	Ford	WDW	TUS	HOM	PHO	POR	EVG	I70	NHA	TEX	BRI	NZH	MLW	LVL	CNS	HPT	IRP	FLM	NSV	GLN	RCH	MAR	SON	MMR	CAL; 35	PHO	LVS	N/A	-
2004	Greg Biffle	44	Ford	DAY	ATL	MAR	MFD	CLT	DOV	TEX	MEM	MLW	KAN	KEN	GTW	MCH	IRP	NSH	BRI	RCH	NHA	LVS	CAL	TEX	MAR	PHO	DAR	HOM; 8		47th	216
2007	David Starr	10	Ford	DAY; 20	CAL; 28	ATL; 22	MAR; 11	KAN; 15	CLT; 23	MFD; 19	DOV; 25	TEX; 5	MCH; 13	MLW; 10	MEM; 13	KEN; 12	IRP; 17	NSH; 4	BRI; 17	GTW; 22	NHA; 14	LVS; 14	TAL; 11	MAR; 4	ATL; 15	TEX; 19	PHO; 36	HOM; 6		12th	2921
2008	Brendan Gaughan	10	Ford	DAY; 34	CAL; 12	ATL; 15	MAR; 11	KAN; 6	CLT; 3	MFD; 30	DOV; 20	TEX; 15	MCH; 5	MLW; 16	MEM; 22	KEN; 28	IRP; 6	NSH; 24	BRI; 13	GTW; 21	NHA; 20	LVS; 20	TAL; 20	MAR; 22	ATL; 16	TEX; 16	PHO; 10	HOM; 18		18th	2840
2009	James Buescher	10	Ford	DAY; 25	CAL; 13	ATL; 14	MAR; 11	KAN; 12	CLT; 12	DOV; 24	TEX; 18	MCH; 33	MLW; 5	MEM; 20	KEN; 8	IRP; 6	NSH; 17	BRI; 13	CHI; 20	IOW; 14	GTW; 23	NHA; 17	LVS; 13	MAR; 11	TAL; 15	TEX; 17	PHO; 23	HOM; 18		17th	2884

=== No. 14 Truck History ===
In 1997, CBR focused its operations towards NASCAR, specifically its all-new Craftsman Truck Series. Continuing his partnership with Crawford and Ford, Mitchell debuted the No. 14 Ford at the Chevy Trucks Challenge in 1997 with Circle Bar sponsoring. Crawford made every race and finished 12th in points, runner up to Kenny Irwin Jr. for Rookie of the Year. 1998 brought the team's first win at Homestead, but inconsistency put them at 18th in points. Crawford would not win for the next four years, but had two top ten points finishes in between, including a runner-up points finish to Mike Bliss in 2002. Crawford would take his second, and arguably biggest win at the season opening Florida Dodge Dealers 250, with a last lap pass on Travis Kvapil. The win propelled him to a seventh-place points finish. Rick would win again in 2004 at Martinsville, but dropped to twelfth in points. The 2005 season was a mixed bag, as the team won again at Loudon, but Crawford was forced to miss the first race of his career due to a crash during qualifying at Kentucky. Road racer Boris Said took his place, but was taken out in an early wreck. Rick won again at ORP in 2006 and finished ninth in points. Although the 2007 season was a winless one for the No. 14 team, they added on a second truck with David Starr who brought along sponsorship from Navistar International for both trucks. The added equipment resulted in a near win at Mansfield Motorsports Park and a fifth-place points finish for Crawford. Crawford slipped to seventh in points in 2008, and tenth in 2009 with twenty top-tens in between both seasons. Longtime crew chief Kevin "Cowboy" Starland left Circle Bar after 2009 for Panhandle Motorsports and International departed both the No. 10 and the No. 14 for Randy Moss Motorsports. Despite the lack of sponsorship, Circle Bar gained a new crew chief in Blake Bainbridge and ran the first four races of the season before having to release Crawford before Kansas and having to wait on additional sponsorship to continue running the season. The team has not been heard from since. Team owner Tom Mitchell died in August 2014 at age 83.

==== Truck No. 14 results ====
Year	Driver	No.	Make	1	2	3	4	5	6	7	8	9	10	11	12	13	14	15	16	17	18	19	20	21	22	23	24	25	26	27	Owners	Pts
1997	Rick Crawford	14	Ford	WDW; 11	TUS; 12	HOM; 18	PHO; 21	POR; 8	EVG; 23	I70; 15	NHA; 6	TEX; 3	BRI; 6	NZH; 18	MLW; 34	LVL; 16	CNS; 6	HPT; 8	IRP; 13	FLM; 15	NSV; 8	GLN; 14	RCH; 34	MAR; 24	SON; 25	MMR; 6	CAL; 10	PHO; 13	LVS; 10		12th	3149
1998	Rick Crawford	14	Ford	WDW; 29	HOM; 1	PHO; 5	POR; 27	EVG; 21	I70; 18	GLN; 14	TEX; 26	BRI; 38	MLW; 26	NZH; 29	CAL; 15	PPR; 11	IRP; 34	NHA; 22	FLM; 15	NSV; 3	HPT; 15	LVL; 25	RCH; 11	MEM; 5	GTY; 7	MAR; 15	SON; 29	MMR; 27	PHO; 16	LVS; 14	20th	2956
1999	Rick Crawford	14	Ford	HOM; 8	PHO; 6	EVG; 12	MMR; 22	MAR; 33	MEM; 22	PPR; 8	I70; 27	BRI; 21	TEX; 12	PIR; 16	GLN; 10	MLW; 3	NSV; 14	NZH; 17	MCH; 29	NHA; 5	IRP; 12	GTY; 9	HPT; 4	RCH; 12	LVS; 8	LVL; 7	TEX; 23	CAL; 35			15th	3018
2000	Rick Crawford	14	Ford	DAY; 34	HOM; 7	PHO; 10	MMR; 9	MAR; 15	PIR; 5	GTY; 12	MEM; 6	PPR; 13	EVG; 14	TEX; 8	KEN; 10	GLN; 9	MLW; 14	NHA; 13	NZH; 13	MCH; 7	IRP; 31	NSV; 10	CIC; 28	RCH; 16	DOV; 3	TEX; 6	CAL; 12				11th	3053
2001	Rick Crawford	14	Ford	DAY; 10	HOM; 8	MMR; 19	MAR; 7	GTY; 4	DAR; 4	PPR; 9	DOV; 14*	TEX; 20	MEM; 16	MLW; 25	KAN; 8	KEN; 27	NHA; 27	IRP; 6	NSH; 3	CIC; 5*	NZH; 4	RCH; 5	SBO; 24	TEX; 2	LVS; 5	PHO; 3	CAL; 2*				8th	3320
2002	Rick Crawford	14	Ford	DAY; 24	DAR; 5	MAR; 3	GTY; 4	PPR; 6	DOV; 3	TEX; 4	MEM; 9	MLW; 14	KAN; 12*	KEN; 4	NHA; 17	MCH; 9	IRP; 11	NSH; 2	RCH; 4	TEX; 4*	SBO; 3	LVS; 6	CAL; 5	PHO; 3	HOM; 7						2nd	3313
2003	Rick Crawford	14	Ford	DAY; 1*	DAR; 7	MMR; 6	MAR; 6	CLT; 3	DOV; 8*	TEX; 14	MEM; 11	MLW; 3	KAN; 23	KEN; 11	GTW; 5	MCH; 12	IRP; 14	NSH; 3	BRI; 3	RCH; 6	NHA; 18	CAL; 4	LVS; 36	SBO; 5	TEX; 9	MAR; 4	PHO; 11	HOM; 2			7th	3578
2004	Rick Crawford	14	Ford	DAY; 4	ATL; 34	MAR; 1	MFD; 7	CLT; 7	DOV; 2	TEX; 15	MEM; 19	MLW; 9	KAN; 3	KEN; 16	GTW; 25	MCH; 32	IRP; 8	NSH; 24	BRI; 17	RCH; 24	NHA; 25	LVS; 11	CAL; 12	TEX; 7	MAR; 16	PHO; 11	DAR; 18	HOM; 28			13th	3030
2005	Rick Crawford	14	Ford	DAY; 36	CAL; 14	ATL; 29*	MAR; 21	GTY; 5	MFD; 6	CLT; 25	DOV; 11	TEX; 19	MCH; 6	MLW; 8	KAN; 10	KEN; INQ^{†}	MEM; 11	IRP; 6	NSH; 10	BRI; 21	RCH; 28	NHA; 1	LVS; 7	MAR; 16	ATL; 32	TEX; 8	PHO; 4	HOM; 27			16th	2975
2005	Boris Said	14	Ford													KEN; 35															16th	2975
2006	Rick Crawford	14	Ford	DAY; 8	CAL; 8	ATL; 10	MAR; 26	GTY; 24	CLT; 11	MFD; 12	DOV; 8	TEX; 3	MCH; 6	MLW; 9	KAN; 2	KEN; 2	MEM; 13	IRP; 1*	NSH; 28	BRI; 13	NHA; 7	LVS; 14	TAL; 15	MAR; 9	ATL; 5	TEX; 33	PHO; 33	HOM; 15			10th	3252
2007	Rick Crawford	14	Ford	DAY; 10	CAL; 9	ATL; 4	MAR; 3	KAN; 2	CLT; 10	MFD; 23*	DOV; 23	TEX; 3	MCH; 6	MLW; 5	MEM; 28	KEN; 30	IRP; 4	NSH; 6	BRI; 5	GTW; 11	NHA; 6	LVS; 9	TAL; 2	MAR; 5	ATL; 12	TEX; 5	PHO; 12	HOM; 3			5th	3523
2008	Rick Crawford	14	Ford	DAY; 5	CAL; 14	ATL; 11	MAR; 3	KAN; 9	CLT; 5	MFD; 13	DOV; 9	TEX; 21	MCH; 11	MLW; 8	MEM; 4	KEN; 14	IRP; 12	NSH; 23	BRI; 5	GTW; 8	NHA; 5	LVS; 6	TAL; 28	MAR; 3	ATL; 12	TEX; 11	PHO; 9	HOM; 33			8th	3315
2009	Rick Crawford	14	Ford	DAY; 21	CAL; 14	ATL; 16	MAR; 5	KAN; 14	CLT; 11	DOV; 19	TEX; 5	MCH; 12	MLW; 12	MEM; 11	KEN; 17	IRP; 11	NSH; 7	BRI; 19	CHI; 4	IOW; 17	GTW; 10	NHA; 10	LVS; 11	MAR; 15	TAL; 21	TEX; 10	PHO; 14	HOM; 17			12th	3161
2010	Rick Crawford	14	Ford	DAY; 28	ATL; 9	MAR; 19	NSH; 10	KAN	DOV	CLT	TEX	MCH	IOW	GTY	IRP	POC	NSH	DAR	BRI	CHI	KEN	NHA	LVS	MAR	TAL	TEX	PHO	HOM			42nd	457
