= Scot Walters =

American racing driver

- Born: November 18, 1967 (age 58); Cornelius, North Carolina, U.S.

NASCAR O'Reilly Auto Parts Series career
- 1 race run over 1 year
- Best finish: 122nd (1998)
- First race: 1998 Kenwood Home & Car Audio 300 (Fontana)
Wins	Top tens	Poles
0	0	0

NASCAR FedEx Freight Truck Series career
- 31 races run over 3 years
- Best finish: 19th (1998)
- First race: 1997 Link-Belt Construction Equipment 225 (Louisville)
- Last race: 1999 Florida Dodge Dealers 400K (Homestead)
Wins	Top tens	Poles
0	4	0
- Statistics up to date as of January 2, 2011.

Scot Walters (born November 18, 1967) is an American stock car racing driver from Cornelius, North Carolina. He competed in NASCAR from 1997 to 1999 in the Craftsman Truck Series, as well as one Busch Series race in 1998.

== NASCAR career ==
Walters, born on November 18, 1967, in Cornelius, North Carolina, began his NASCAR career at Louisville Motor Speedway during the 1997 NASCAR Craftsman Truck Series season. During his first race he finished seventh after starting 13th. He also started two other races during 1997, in which he finished 26th and 29th after failing to finish both. In the season, he failed to qualify for one race, which occurred at I-70 Speedway. One year later, he competed in all 27 Craftsman Truck Series events, as well as one Busch Series event. During the 1998 Truck season, he recorded three top tens, and two did not finishes (DNF), with his best finish during the season was eighth at Nashville Speedway. In his first Busch Series event, he finished 43rd after only completing two laps out of 150 at Auto Club Speedway. In 1999, Walters only competed in one Craftsman Truck Series race, which was located at Homestead–Miami Speedway. During the race, he finished 20th after completing 152 laps out of 172 because of an engine problem.

== Motorsports career results ==
=== NASCAR ===
(key) (Bold - Pole position awarded by qualifying time. Italics - Pole position earned by points standings or practice time. * – Most laps led.)

==== Busch Series ====
NASCAR Busch Series results
Year	Team	No.	Make	1	2	3	4	5	6	7	8	9	10	11	12	13	14	15	16	17	18	19	20	21	22	23	24	25	26	27	28	29	30	31	32	NBSC	Pts
1997	Brewco Motorsports	55	Chevy	DAY	CAR	RCH	ATL	LVS	DAR	HCY	TEX	BRI	NSV	TAL	NHA	NZH	CLT	DOV	SBO	GLN	MLW	MYB	GTY; DNQ	IRP	MCH	BRI	DAR	RCH	DOV	CLT	CAL	CAR	HOM			N/A	-
1998	Brewco Motorsports	27	Chevy	DAY	CAR	LVS	NSV	DAR	BRI	TEX	HCY	TAL	NHA	NZH	CLT	DOV	RCH	PPR	GLN	MLW	MYB	CAL; 43	SBO	IRP	MCH	BRI	DAR	RCH	DOV	CLT	GTY	CAR	ATL	HOM		122nd	34
1999	Grubb Motorsports	83	Chevy	DAY	CAR	LVS	ATL	DAR	TEX	NSV; DNQ	BRI	TAL	CAL	NHA	RCH	NZH	CLT	DOV	SBO	GLN	MLW	MYB	PPR	GTY	IRP	MCH	BRI	DAR	RCH	DOV	CLT	CAR	MEM	PHO	HOM	N/A	-

==== Camping World Truck Series ====
NASCAR Camping World Truck Series results
Year	Team	No.	Make	1	2	3	4	5	6	7	8	9	10	11	12	13	14	15	16	17	18	19	20	21	22	23	24	25	26	27	NCWTC	Pts
1997	Brewco Motorsports	37	Chevy	WDW	TUS	HOM	PHO	POR	EVG	I70; DNQ	NHA	TEX	BRI	NZH	MLW	LVL; 7	CNS	HPT	IRP	FLM	NSV; 26	GLN	RCH; 29	MAR	SON	MMR	CAL	PHO	LVS		56th	362
1998	Brewco Motorsports	37	Chevy	WDW; 26	HOM; 10	PHO; 22	POR; 22	EVG; 25	I70; 15	GLN; 22	TEX; 36	BRI; 21	MLW; 20	NZH; 13	CAL; 21	PPR; 12	IRP; 21	NHA; 19	FLM; 22	NSV; 8	HPT; 13	LVL; 12	RCH; 20	MEM; 36	GTY; 9	MAR; 16	SON; 16	MMR; 15	PHO; 21	LVS; 23	19th	2859
1999	Raptor Performance Motorsports	81	Ford	HOM; 20	PHO	EVG	MMR	MAR	MEM	PPR	I70	BRI	TEX	PIR	GLN	MLW	NSV	NZH	MCH	NHA	IRP	GTY	HPT	RCH	LVS	LVL	TEX	CAL			95th	103
