= O'Reilly Auto Parts 200 =

There have been three NASCAR Craftsman Truck Series races named O'Reilly Auto Parts 200:

- O'Reilly Auto Parts 200 (I-70), run at I-70 Speedway in 1999
- O'Reilly Auto Parts 200 (Memphis), run at Memphis Motorsports Park in 2002
- O'Reilly Auto Parts 200 (Bristol), run at Bristol Motor Speedway in 2006

== See also ==
- O'Reilly 200 (disambiguation)
