= O'Reilly 200 =

There have been two NASCAR races named O'Reilly 200 or O'Reilly 200 presented by Valvoline:

- O'Reilly 200 (Memphis), held at Memphis Motorsports Park from 2003 to 2008
- O'Reilly 200 (Bristol), held at Bristol Motor Speedway from 2007 to 2011

== See also ==
- O'Reilly Auto Parts 200 (disambiguation)
- UNOH 200
