= NAPA 200 =

NAPA 200 may refer to:

- NAPA Auto Parts 200, a former NASCAR Nationwide Series race run at Circuit Gilles Villeneuve from 2007 to 2012
- NAPA 200, a former NASCAR Busch Series race run at Michigan International Speedway
- NAPA 200, a former NASCAR Craftsman Truck Series race run at Tucson Raceway Park
