= 1997 NASCAR Craftsman Truck Series =

American motorsport season

The 1997 NASCAR Craftsman Truck Series was the third season of the Craftsman Truck Series, the pickup truck racing series sanctioned by NASCAR in the United States. Jack Sprague of Hendrick Motorsports won the title.

== Teams & drivers ==
List of full-time teams at the start of 1997.

Team	Truck(s)	#	Driver(s)	Listed owner(s)	Crew chief
AAG Racing	Chevrolet C/K	65	Kenny Allen	Shiela Allen	
Blake Motorsports	Chevrolet C/K	12	Doug George	Bob Blake	
Brevak Racing	Ford F-150	31	Tony Roper (R)	Shelly Brevak	Bob Brevak
Charles Hardy Motorsports	Chevrolet C/K	35	Dave Rezendes	Charles Hardy	Tony Gibson
Chesrown Racing	Chevrolet C/K	6	Rick Carelli	Marshall Chesrown	Rick Ren
Circle Bar Racing	Ford F-150	14	Rick Crawford (R)	Tom Mitchell	Roland Wlodyka
Clark Racing	Chevrolet C/K	23	T. J. Clark	Debbie Clark	
CSG Motorsports	Ford F-150	57	Brian Cunningham	Ed Scherer	
Dale Earnhardt, Inc.	Chevrolet C/K	16	Ron Hornaday Jr.	Dale Earnhardt	Fred Graves
Darrell Waltrip Motorsports	Chevrolet C/K	17	Rich Bickle	Darrell Waltrip	Dave McCarty
Geoff Bodine Racing	Ford F-150	7	Tammy Jo Kirk (R)	Geoff Bodine	Ernie Cope
Hendrick Motorsports	Chevrolet C/K	24	Jack Sprague	Rick Hendrick	Dennis Connor
Impact Motorsports	Ford F-150	86	Stacy Compton (R)	David Hodson	Troy Selberg
Irvan-Simo Racing	Ford F-150	44	Boris Said (R)	Mark Simo	Jay Smith
K Automotive Racing	Dodge Ram	29	Bob Keselowski	Ron Keselowski	Ron Keselowski
Ken Schrader Racing	Chevrolet C/K	52	Tobey Butler	Ken Schrader	Tim Kohuth
L&R Racing	Dodge Ram	90	Lance Norick	Ron Norick	
Liberty Racing	Ford F-150	98	Kenny Irwin Jr. (R)	Jim Herrick	Gary Showalter
Petty Enterprises	Dodge Ram	43	Jimmy Hensley	Dodge Motorsports	Richard Petty
Phelon Motorsports	Ford F-150	66	Bryan Reffner	Dale Phelon	
RGR Racing	Ford F-150	27	Rob Rizzo (R)	Rob Rizzo	
Richard Childress Racing	Chevrolet C/K	3	Jay Sauter	Richard Childress	Todd Berrier
Roehrig Motorsports	Dodge Ram	18	Michael Dokken	Kurt Roehrig	Mike Bodick
Roehrig Motorsports	Dodge Ram	19	Tony Raines (R)	Carmela Roehrig	Bob Hustler
Roush Racing	Ford F-150	80	Joe Ruttman	Jack Roush	Randy Goss
Roush Racing	Ford F-150	99	Chuck Bown	Jack Roush	
Spears Motorsports	Chevrolet C/K	75	Dan Press	Wayne Spears	
ThorSport Racing	Chevrolet C/K	88	Terry Cook (R)	Duke Thorson	
Ultra Motorsports	Ford F-150	2	Mike Bliss	Marlene Smith	Barry Dodson
Walker Evans Racing	Chevrolet C/K	20	Butch Miller	Phyllis Evans	
Xpress Motorsports	Chevrolet C/K	61	Randy Tolsma (R)	Steve Coulter	

== Schedule ==
No.	Race title	Track	Date
1	Chevy Trucks Challenge	Walt Disney World Speedway, Bay Lake	January 19
2	NAPA 200	Tucson Raceway Park, Tucson	March 1
3	Florida Dodge Dealers 400	Homestead Motorsports Complex, Homestead	March 16
4	Chevy Desert Star Classic	Phoenix International Raceway, Phoenix	April 20
5	Craftsman 200	Portland Speedway, Portland	May 3
6	NAPACARD 200	Evergreen Speedway, Monroe	May 10
7	Western Auto/Parts America 200	I-70 Speedway, Odessa	May 24
8	Pennzoil Discount Center 200	New Hampshire International Speedway, Loudon	May 31
9	Pronto Auto Parts 400K	Texas Motor Speedway, Fort Worth	June 6
10	Loadhandler 200	Bristol Motor Speedway, Bristol	June 21
11	NAPA AutoCare 200	Nazareth Speedway, Nazareth	June 29
12	Sears DieHard 200	Milwaukee Mile, West Allis	July 5
13	Link-Belt Construction Equipment 225	Louisville Motor Speedway, Louisville	July 12
14	Colorado 250 By Snap-On Tools	Colorado National Speedway, Dacono	July 19
15	Lund Look 275K	Heartland Park Topeka, Topeka	July 27
16	Cummins 200	Indianapolis Raceway Park, Brownsburg	July 31
17	Stevens Beil/Genuine Car Parts 200	Flemington Speedway, Flemington	August 9
18	Federated Auto Parts 250	Nashville Fairgrounds Speedway, Nashville	August 16
19	Parts America 150	Watkins Glen International, Watkins Glen	August 24
20	Virginia Is For Lovers 200	Richmond International Raceway, Richmond	September 4
21	Hanes 250	Martinsville Speedway, Ridgeway	September 27
22	Kragen/Exide 151	Sears Point Raceway, Sonoma	October 5
23	Dodge California Truck Stop 300	Mesa Marin Raceway, Bakersfield	October 12
24	The No Fear Challenge	California Speedway, Fontana	October 18
25	GM Goodwrench/Delco 300	Phoenix International Raceway, Phoenix	November 1
26	Carquest Auto Parts 420K	Las Vegas Motor Speedway, Las Vegas	November 9

== Races ==
No.	Race	Pole position	Most laps led	Winning driver	Manufacturer
1	Chevy Trucks Challenge	Jack Sprague	Jack Sprague	Joe Ruttman	Ford
2	NAPA 200	Michael Dokken	Michael Dokken	Ron Hornaday Jr.	Chevrolet
3	Florida Dodge Dealers 400	Joe Ruttman	Jack Sprague	Kenny Irwin Jr.	Ford
4	Chevy Desert Star Classic	Jack Sprague	Jack Sprague	Jack Sprague	Chevrolet
5	Craftsman 200	Rich Bickle	Rich Bickle	Rich Bickle	Chevrolet
6	NAPACARD 200	Rich Bickle	Rich Bickle	Rich Bickle	Chevrolet
7	Western Auto/Parts America 200	Rich Bickle	Tony Raines	Tony Raines	Dodge
8	Pennzoil Discount Center 200	Jack Sprague	Jack Sprague	Jay Sauter	Chevrolet
9	Pronto Auto Parts 400K	Mike Bliss	Mike Bliss	Kenny Irwin Jr.	Ford
10	Loadhandler 200	Ron Hornaday Jr.	Ron Hornaday Jr.	Ron Hornaday Jr.	Chevrolet
11	NAPA AutoCare 200	Mike Bliss	Jack Sprague	Jack Sprague	Chevrolet
12	Sears DieHard 200	Jack Sprague	Jack Sprague	Ron Hornaday Jr.	Chevrolet
13	Link-Belt Construction Equipment 225	Jimmy Hensley	Ron Hornaday Jr.	Ron Hornaday Jr.	Chevrolet
14	Colorado 250 By Snap-On Tools	Ron Hornaday Jr.	Ron Hornaday Jr.	Ron Hornaday Jr.	Chevrolet
15	Lund Look 275K	Joe Ruttman	Ron Hornaday Jr.	Joe Ruttman	Ford
16	Cummins 200	Jimmy Hensley	Jimmy Hensley	Ron Hornaday Jr.	Chevrolet
17	Stevens Beil/Genuine Car Parts 200	Terry Cook	Ron Hornaday Jr.	Ron Hornaday Jr.	Chevrolet
18	Federated Auto Parts 250	Mike Bliss	Ron Hornaday Jr.	Jack Sprague	Chevrolet
19	Parts America 150	Ron Fellows	Jack Sprague	Ron Fellows	Chevrolet
20	Virginia Is For Lovers 200	Ron Hornaday Jr.	Bob Keselowski	Bob Keselowski	Dodge
21	Hanes 250	Rich Bickle	Rich Bickle	Rich Bickle	Chevrolet
22	Kragen/Exide 151	Dave Rezendes	Dave Rezendes	Joe Ruttman	Ford
23	Dodge California Truck Stop 300	Mike Bliss	Ron Hornaday Jr.	Randy Tolsma	Chevrolet
24	The No Fear Challenge	Mike Bliss	Mike Bliss	Mike Bliss	Ford
25	GM Goodwrench/Delco 300	Mike Bliss	Jack Sprague	Joe Ruttman	Ford
26	Carquest Auto Parts 420K	Jack Sprague	Mike Bliss	Joe Ruttman	Ford

=== Chevy Trucks Challenge ===
The inaugural Chevy Trucks Challenge was held January 19 at Walt Disney World Speedway. Jack Sprague won the pole.

Top ten results

1. #80 - Joe Ruttman
2. #20 - Butch Miller
3. #17 - Rich Bickle
4. #3 - Jay Sauter
5. #6 - Rick Carelli
6. #43 - Jimmy Hensley
7. #98 - Kenny Irwin Jr.
8. #94 - Ron Barfield Jr.
9. #13 - Curtis Markham
10. #86 - Stacy Compton

Failed to qualify: #01-Billy Ogle, #04-Thomas Spangler, #08-Felix Giles, #9-Greg Marlowe, #19-Tony Raines, #22-David Smith, #23-T. J. Clark, #25-Andy Genzman, #26-Andy Belmont, #27-Rob Rizzo, #39-Jeff Spraker, #41-Randy Renfrow, #45-Michael Cohen, #51-Perry Tripp, #52-Tobey Butler, #54-Jon Leavy, #56-Darin Brassfield, #59-Shane Doles, #61-Randy Tolsma, #64-Chad Dokken, #69-Jimmy Davis, #73-Bob Schacht, #88-Terry Cook, #92-Mark Kinser

- Tobey Butler replaced Bob Brevak in the #34 truck in the race.

=== NAPA 200 ===
The NAPA 200 was held March 1 at Tucson Raceway Park. Michael Dokken won the pole.

Top ten results

1. #16 - Ron Hornaday Jr.
2. #17 - Rich Bickle
3. #3 - Jay Sauter
4. #20 - Butch Miller
5. #2 - Mike Bliss
6. #27 - Rob Rizzo
7. #24 - Jack Sprague
8. #43 - Jimmy Hensley
9. #99 - Chuck Bown
10. #7 - Dave Rezendes

Failed to qualify: #07-Tammy Jo Kirk, #09-Tim Buckley, #9-Kevin Briscoe, #11-Mike Hurlbert, #15-Mike Cope, #23-T. J. Clark, #25-Andy Genzman, #26-Andy Belmont, #31-Tony Roper, #32-Curtis Markham, #45-Michael Cohen, #52-Tobey Butler, #53-Scott Hansen, #54-Jon Leavy, #55-Lance Hooper, #56-Darin Brassfield, #63-Carlos Serrano, #65-Kenny Allen, #73-Scott Grissom, #88-Terry Cook, #90-Lance Norick

- Tony Roper replaced Bob Brevak in the #34 truck in the race.

=== Florida Dodge Dealers 400 ===
The Florida Dodge Dealers 400 was held March 16 at Homestead–Miami Speedway. Joe Ruttman won the pole. Tragedy struck during the closing laps of this race when John Nemechek struck the wall in turn 2 on lap 144, suffering massive head injuries. He died five days later.

Top ten results

1. #98 - Kenny Irwin Jr.
2. #2 - Mike Bliss
3. #99 - Chuck Bown
4. #93 - Mike Skinner
5. #24 - Jack Sprague
6. #16 - Ron Hornaday Jr.
7. #35 - Dave Rezendes
8. #6 - Rick Carelli
9. #20 - Butch Miller
10. #90 - Lance Norick

Failed to qualify: #00-Frank Kimmel, #10-Toby Porter, #23-T. J. Clark, #34-Bob Brevak, #45-Michael Cohen, #51-Terry McCarthy, #54-Jon Leavy, #55-Jim Bown, #61-Randy Tolsma, #62-Blaise Alexander, #68-Bobby Dotter, #68-Ronnie Newman, #73-Bob Schacht, #81-Jerry Glanville, #88-Terry Cook

=== Chevy Desert Star Classic ===
The Chevy Desert Star Classic was held April 20 at Phoenix International Raceway. Jack Sprague won the pole.

Top ten results

1. #24 - Jack Sprague
2. #80 - Joe Ruttman
3. #2 - Mike Bliss
4. #16 - Ron Hornaday Jr.
5. #17 - Rich Bickle
6. #29 - Bob Keselowski
7. #35 - Dave Rezendes
8. #99 - Chuck Bown
9. #10 - Toby Porter
10. #6 - Rick Carelli

Failed to qualify: #13-Mike Colabucci, #19-Tony Raines, #25-Andy Genzman, #26-Andy Belmont, #27-Rob Rizzo, #38-Doug Adams, #54-Jon Leavy, #55-Jim Bown, #61-Randy Tolsma, #92-Mark Kinser, #04-Tommy Spangler

=== Craftsman 200 ===
The Craftsman 200 was held May 3 at Portland Speedway. Rich Bickle won the pole.

Top ten results

1. #17 - Rich Bickle
2. #16 - Ron Hornaday Jr.
3. #20 - Butch Miller
4. #24 - Jack Sprague
5. #29 - Bob Keselowski
6. #2 - Mike Bliss
7. #19 - Tony Raines
8. #14 - Rick Crawford
9. #52 - Tobey Butler
10. #3 - Jay Sauter

Failed to qualify: #10-Toby Porter, #23-T. J. Clark, #25-Andy Genzman, #56-Brandon Butler, #57-Brian Cunningham

=== NAPACARD 200 ===
The NAPACARD 200 was held May 10 at Evergreen Speedway. Rich Bickle won the pole.

Top ten results

1. #17 - Rich Bickle
2. #24 - Jack Sprague
3. #18 - Michael Dokken
4. #80 - Joe Ruttman
5. #98 - Kenny Irwin Jr.
6. #29 - Bob Keselowski
7. #2 - Mike Bliss
8. #86 - Stacy Compton
9. #16 - Ron Hornaday Jr.
10. #20 - Butch Miller

Failed to qualify: #01-Dave Goulet, #4-Bill Sedgwick, #57-Brian Cunningham, #77-Lonnie Rush Jr., #87-Jim Bown, #92-Mark Kinser

=== Western Auto/Parts America 200 ===
The Western Auto/Parts America 200 was held May 24 at I-70 Speedway. Rich Bickle won the pole.

Top ten results

1. #19 - Tony Raines*
2. #43 - Jimmy Hensley
3. #99 - Chuck Bown
4. #17 - Rich Bickle
5. #20 - Butch Miller
6. #80 - Joe Ruttman
7. #6 - Rick Carelli
8. #2 - Mike Bliss
9. #31 - Tony Roper
10. #24 - Jack Sprague

Failed to qualify: #27-Rob Rizzo, #37-Scot Walters, #46-Marc Robe, #61-Randy Tolsma, #90-Lance Norick, #92-Mark Kinser

- This was Raines' first career Craftsman Truck Series victory.

=== Pennzoil Discount Center 200 ===
The Pennzoil Discount Center 200 was held May 31 at New Hampshire International Speedway. Jack Sprague won the pole.

Top ten results

1. #3 - Jay Sauter
2. #24 - Jack Sprague
3. #6 - Rick Carelli
4. #44 - Boris Said
5. #98 - Kenny Irwin Jr.
6. #14 - Rick Crawford
7. #35 - Dave Rezendes
8. #66 - Bryan Reffner
9. #80 - Joe Ruttman
10. #99 - Chuck Bown

Failed to qualify: #39-Jeff Spraker, #47-Danny Hieber

=== Pronto Auto Parts 400K ===
The inaugural Pronto Auto Parts 400K was held June 6 at Texas Motor Speedway. Mike Bliss won the pole.

Top ten results

1. #98 - Kenny Irwin Jr.
2. #44 - Boris Said
3. #14 - Rick Crawford
4. #99 - Chuck Bown
5. #2 - Mike Bliss
6. #29 - Bob Keselowski
7. #35 - Dave Rezendes
8. #61 - Randy Tolsma
9. #80 - Joe Ruttman
10. #42 - Ken Bouchard

Failed to qualify: none

=== Loadhandler 200 ===
The Loadhandler 200 was held June 21 at Bristol Motor Speedway. Ron Hornaday Jr. won the pole.

Top ten results

1. #16 - Ron Hornaday Jr.
2. #17 - Rich Bickle
3. #3 - Jay Sauter
4. #6 - Rick Carelli
5. #80 - Joe Ruttman
6. #14 - Rick Crawford
7. #24 - Jack Sprague
8. #43 - Jimmy Hensley
9. #99 - Chuck Bown
10. #66 - Bryan Reffner

Failed to qualify: #0-James Boulton, #01-Billy Ogle Jr., #11-Eddie Johnson, #22-Tommy Humphries, #25-Andy Genzman, #57-Brian Cunningham, #70-Joe Buford

=== NAPA AutoCare 200 ===
The NAPA AutoCare 200 was held June 29 at Nazareth Speedway. Mike Bliss won the pole.

Top ten results

1. #24 - Jack Sprague
2. #80 - Joe Ruttman
3. #2 - Mike Bliss
4. #17 - Rich Bickle
5. #18 - Michael Dokken
6. #6 - Rick Carelli
7. #99 - Chuck Bown
8. #37 - David Green
9. #3 - Jay Sauter
10. #19 - Tony Raines

Failed to qualify: none

=== Sears DieHard 200 ===
The Sears DieHard 200 was held July 5 at Milwaukee Mile. Jack Sprague won the pole.

Top ten results

1. #16 - Ron Hornaday Jr.
2. #3 - Jay Sauter
3. #17 - Rich Bickle
4. #24 - Jack Sprague
5. #6 - Rick Carelli
6. #52 - Mike Wallace
7. #19 - Tony Raines
8. #43 - Jimmy Hensley
9. #80 - Joe Ruttman -1
10. #99 - Chuck Bown -1

Failed to qualify: #4-Bill Sedgwick, #25-Andy Genzman, #63-Cindy Peterson, #73-Bob Schacht

=== Link-Belt Construction Equipment 225 ===
The Link-Belt Construction Equipment 225 was held July 12 at Louisville Motor Speedway. Jimmy Hensley won the pole.

Top ten results

1. #16 - Ron Hornaday Jr.*
2. #80 - Joe Ruttman
3. #43 - Jimmy Hensley
4. #19 - Tony Raines
5. #17 - Rich Bickle
6. #86 - Stacy Compton
7. #37 - Scot Walters
8. #24 - Jack Sprague
9. #44 - Boris Said
10. #52 - Mike Wallace

Failed to qualify: #06-Billy Pauch, #11-Eddie Johnson, #22-Tommy Humphries, #39-Jeff Spraker, #41-Bill Sedgwick, #91-Gary Brooks

- Hornaday led every lap en route to the win.

=== Colorado 250 by Snap-On Tools ===
The Colorado 250 by Snap-On Tools was held July 19 at Colorado National Speedway. Ron Hornaday Jr. won the pole.

Top ten results

1. #16 - Ron Hornaday Jr.
2. #2 - Mike Bliss
3. #86 - Stacy Compton
4. #3 - Jay Sauter
5. #17 - Rich Bickle
6. #14 - Rick Crawford
7. #6 - Rick Carelli
8. #43 - Jimmy Hensley
9. #19 - Tony Raines
10. #20 - Butch Miller

Failed to qualify: none

=== Lund Look 275K ===
The Lund Look 275K was held July 27 at Heartland Park Topeka*. Joe Ruttman won the pole.

Top ten results

1. #80 - Joe Ruttman
2. #24 - Jack Sprague
3. #16 - Ron Hornaday Jr.
4. #55 - Dorsey Schroeder
5. #93 - Mike Skinner
6. #1 - Bobby Hamilton
7. #43 - Jimmy Hensley
8. #14 - Rick Crawford
9. #6 - Rick Carelli
10. #19 - Tony Raines

Failed to qualify: #5-Robbie Pyle, #45-Michael Cohen, #54-Jon Leavy, #82-Randy Nelson

- This was the first Craftsman Truck Series race at Heartland Park Topeka held on the 2.1 mile configuration. The previous two races were on the shorter 1.8 mile layout.

=== Cummins 200 ===
The Cummins 200 was held July 31 at Indianapolis Raceway Park. Jimmy Hensley won the pole.

Top ten results

1. #16 - Ron Hornaday Jr.
2. #24 - Jack Sprague
3. #43 - Jimmy Hensley*
4. #80 - Joe Ruttman
5. #53 - Mike McLaughlin
6. #61 - Randy Tolsma
7. #98 - Kenny Irwin Jr.
8. #6 - Rick Carelli
9. #35 - Dave Rezendes
10. #17 - Rich Bickle

Failed to qualify: #9-Greg Marlowe, #26-Jerry Robertson, #39-Jeff Spraker, #47-Danny Hieber, #58-Chris Horn, #71-Gary St. Amant, #73-Bob Schacht, #77-Eliseo Salazar

- Hensley led the first 200 laps but lost the lead with 2 to go in the green-white-checker.

=== Stevens Beil/Genuine Parts 200 ===
The Stevens Beil/Genuine Parts 200 was held August 9 at Flemington Speedway. Terry Cook won the pole.

Top ten results

1. #16 - Ron Hornaday Jr.
2. #80 - Joe Ruttman
3. #17 - Rich Bickle
4. #24 - Jack Sprague
5. #6 - Rick Carelli
6. #3 - Jay Sauter
7. #52 - Mike Wallace
8. #20 - Butch Miller
9. #31 - Tony Roper
10. #2 - Mike Bliss

Failed to qualify: #02-Eric Norris, #06-Billy Pauch, #11-Eddie Johnson, #12-Andy Genzman, #47-Danny Hieber

=== Federated Auto Parts 250 ===
The Federated Auto Parts 250 was held August 16 at Nashville Speedway USA. Mike Bliss won the pole.

Top ten results

1. #24 - Jack Sprague
2. #16 - Ron Hornaday Jr.
3. #20 - Butch Miller
4. #35 - Dave Rezendes
5. #86 - Stacy Compton
6. #17 - Rich Bickle -1
7. #99 - Chuck Bown -1
8. #14 - Rick Crawford -1
9. #2 - Mike Bliss -1
10. #6 - Rick Carelli -1

Failed to qualify: #00-Frank Kimmel, #02-Eric Norris, #4-Bill Sedgwick, #13-Mike Colabucci, #57-Brian Cunningham, #62-Blaise Alexander, #77-Doug George

=== Parts America 150 ===
The Parts America 150 was held August 24 at Watkins Glen International. Ron Fellows won the pole.

Top ten results

1. #48 - Ron Fellows
2. #2 - Mike Bliss
3. #24 - Jack Sprague
4. #80 - Joe Ruttman
5. #16 - Ron Hornaday Jr.
6. #43 - Jimmy Hensley
7. #18 - Ted Christopher
8. #63 - Ricky Johnson
9. #62 - Blaise Alexander
10. #6 - Rick Carelli

Failed to qualify: #12-Andy Genzman, #26-Doug George, #28-Lou Gigliotti, #54-Jon Leavy, #72-Tammy Jo Kirk, #88-Terry Cook, #90-Lance Norick

=== Virginia Is For Lovers 200 ===
The Virginia Is For Lovers 200 was held September 4 at Richmond International Raceway. Ron Hornaday Jr. won the pole.

Top ten results

1. #29 - Bob Keselowski*
2. #24 - Jack Sprague
3. #3 - Jay Sauter
4. #17 - Rich Bickle
5. #98 - Kenny Irwin Jr.
6. #53 - Ken Schrader
7. #2 - Mike Bliss
8. #99 - Chuck Bown
9. #61 - Randy Tolsma
10. #20 - Butch Miller

Failed to qualify: #02-Eric Norris, #05-John Blewett, #12-Greg Marlowe, #22-Tom Baldwin, #27-Rob Rizzo, #39-Jeff Spraker, #42-Mike Ewanitsko, #55-Kevin Grubb, #65-Andy Houston, #70-Joe Buford, #75-Kevin Harvick, #81-Philip Morris, #87-Robert Huffman, #88-Terry Cook, #92-Doug George, #93-Dana Dorman

- This was Keselowski's first and only career victory in the Craftsman Truck Series.
- This was Dodge's first win in the Truck Series.

=== Hanes 250 ===
The Hanes 250 was held September 27 at Martinsville Speedway. Rich Bickle won the pole.

Top ten results

1. #17 - Rich Bickle
2. #28 - Ernie Irvan
3. #2 - Mike Bliss
4. #43 - Jimmy Hensley
5. #51 - Bobby Hamilton
6. #20 - Butch Miller
7. #3 - Jay Sauter
8. #98 - Kenny Irwin Jr.
9. #86 - Stacy Compton
10. #24 - Jack Sprague

Failed to qualify: #03-Kirk Shelmerdine, #11-Ronnie Newman, #22-Tom Baldwin, #25-Andy Genzman, #26-Jerry Robertson, #39-Jeff Spraker, #40-Bill Sedgwick, #41-Randy Renfrow, #42-Mike Ewanitsko, #45-Michael Cohen, #55-Kevin Grubb, #62-Blaise Alexander, #72-Tammy Jo Kirk, #75-Rick Markle, #83-Joe Gaita, #88-Terry Cook, #90-Lance Norick

=== Kragen/Exide 151 ===
The Kragen/Exide 151 was held October 5 at Sears Point Raceway. Dave Rezendes won the pole.

Top ten results

1. #80 - Joe Ruttman
2. #18 - Tom Hubert
3. #3 - Jay Sauter
4. #63 - Ricky Johnson
5. #24 - Jack Sprague
6. #43 - Jimmy Hensley
7. #6 - Rick Carelli
8. #35 - Doug George
9. #46 - Joe Bean
10. #86 - Stacy Compton

Failed to qualify: #4-Bill Sedgwick, #40-Bo Lemler, #83-Joe Huffaker, #85-Milan Garrett

- An incident between Boris Said and Rich Bickle with five laps to go (and subsequent retaliation) caused NASCAR to fine Said $5,000 and put him on probation for the rest of the year. Bickle was also put on probation.
- Dave Rezendes was leading the event when he crashed on his own in the Esses with three laps to go.

=== Dodge California Truckstop 300 ===
The Dodge California Truckstop 300 was held October 12 at Mesa Marin Raceway. Mike Bliss won the pole.

Top ten results

1. #61 - Randy Tolsma*
2. #86 - Stacy Compton
3. #2 - Mike Bliss
4. #3 - Jay Sauter
5. #17 - Rich Bickle
6. #14 - Rick Crawford
7. #52 - Mike Wallace
8. #75 - Kevin Harvick
9. #43 - Jimmy Hensley
10. #24 - Jack Sprague

Failed to qualify: none

- This was Tolsma's first career Craftsman Truck Series victory.

=== The No Fear Challenge ===
The Inaugural No Fear Challenge was held October 18 at California Speedway. Mike Bliss won the pole.

Top ten results

1. #2 - Mike Bliss
2. #52 - Mike Wallace
3. #98 - Kenny Irwin Jr.
4. #28 - Ernie Irvan
5. #61 - Randy Tolsma
6. #24 - Jack Sprague
7. #1 - Michael Waltrip
8. #29 - Bob Keselowski
9. #16 - Ron Hornaday Jr.
10. #14 - Rick Crawford

Failed to qualify: #9-Ron Esau, #46-Joe Bean, #63-Ricky Johnson, #82-Randy Nelson

=== GM Goodwrench Delco 300 ===
The GM Goodwrench Delco 300 was held November 1 at Phoenix International Raceway. Mike Bliss won the pole.

Top ten results

1. #80 - Joe Ruttman
2. #99 - Chuck Bown
3. #24 - Jack Sprague
4. #98 - Kenny Irwin Jr.
5. #6 - Rick Carelli
6. #52 - Mike Wallace
7. #3 - Jay Sauter
8. #20 - Butch Miller
9. #16 - Ron Hornaday Jr.
10. #2 - Mike Bliss

Failed to qualify: #06-Billy Pauch, #27-Kenny Hendrick, #40-Eddie Sharp, #77-Rob Morgan, #82-Randy Nelson, #84-Billy Wilburn, #85-Milan Garrett, #90-Lance Norick

=== Carquest Auto Parts 420K ===
The Carquest Auto Parts 420K was held November 9 at Las Vegas Motor Speedway. Jack Sprague won the pole.

Top ten results

1. #80 - Joe Ruttman
2. #24 - Jack Sprague
3. #16 - Ron Hornaday Jr.
4. #3 - Jay Sauter
5. #2 - Mike Bliss
6. #6 - Rick Carelli
7. #52 - Mike Wallace
8. #75 - Kevin Harvick
9. #99 - Chuck Bown -1
10. #14 - Rick Crawford -1

Failed to qualify: #01-Dave Goulet, #02-Rick McCray, #4-Tim Buckley, #11-Brett Bodine, #12-Tony Toste, #15-Rob Morgan, #18-Kevin Cywinski, #22-Kenny Hendrick, #23-T. J. Clark, #26-Perry Tripp, #27-Tammy Jo Kirk, #36-Jerry Robertson, #40-Eddie Sharp, #46-Joe Bean, #58-Wayne Jacks, #60-Tobey Butler, #65-Andy Houston, #69-Jimmy Davis, #82-Randy Nelson, #84-Billy Wilburn, #85-Milan Garrett, #88-Terry Cook

== Final points standings ==
(key) Bold – Pole position awarded by time. Italics – Pole position earned by points standings. * – Most laps led.

Pos.	Driver	Races																										Points
Pos.	Driver	WDW	TUS	HOM	PHO	POR	EVG	I70	NHA	TEX	BRI	NZH	MLW	LVL	CNS	HPT	IRP	FLM	NSV	GLN	RCH	MAR	SON	MMR	CAL	PHO	LVS	Points
1	Jack Sprague	**15***	7	5*	**1***	4	2	10	**2***	31	7	1*	**4***	8	16	2	2	4	1	3*	2	10	5	10	6	3	**2**	3969
2	Rich Bickle	3	2	11	5	**1***	**1***	**4**	20	21	2	4	3	5	5	23	10	3	6	16	4	**1***	12	5	26	18	16	3737
3	Joe Ruttman	1	28	**26**	2	13	4	6	9	9	5	2	9	2	12	**1**	4	2	19	4	12	12	1	19	29	1	1	3736
4	Mike Bliss	25	5	2	3	6	7	8	17	**5***	30	**3**	23	13	2	17	19	10	9	2	7	3	22	**3**	**1***	10	5*	3611
5	Ron Hornaday Jr.	30	1	6	4	2	9	22	29	27	**1***	24	1	1*	**1***	3*	1	1*	2*	5	**16**	32	26	28*	9	9	3	3574
6	Jay Sauter	4	3	19	11	10	30	31	1	11	3	9	2	31	4	16	31	6	13	12	3	7	3	4	25	7	4	3467
7	Rick Carelli	5	30	8	10	28	19	7	3	22	4	6	5	19	7	9	8	5	10	10	11	15	7	12	15	5	6	3461
8	Jimmy Hensley	6	8	13	14	11	25	2	23	12	8	25	8	**3**	8	7	**3***	13	15	6	13	4	6	9	34	19	15	3385
9	Chuck Bown	12	9	3	8	27	14	3	10	4	9	7	10	22	26	20	12	12	7	34	8	16	14	14	16	2	9	3320
10	Kenny Irwin Jr. **(R)**	7	14	1	17	15	5	14	5	1	26	27	15	18	14	18	7	25	21	28	5	8	31	16	3	4	25	3220
11	Butch Miller	2	4	9	30	3	10	5	14	15	20	23	14	29	10	29	17	8	3	26	10	6	15	17	18	8	28	3186
12	Rick Crawford **(R)**	11	12	18	21	8	23	15	6	3	6	18	34	16	6	8	13	15	8	14	34	24	25	6	10	13	10	3149
13	Stacy Compton **(R)**	10	16	34	33	12	8	30	15	16	25	14	21	6	3	13	26	14	5	25	18	9	10	2	17	14	12	3057
14	Bob Keselowski	34	22	28	6	5	6	27	12	6	31	36	20	24	21	12	16	11	23	15	1*	28	13	21	8	17	13	2915
15	Tony Raines **(R)**	DNQ	15	30	DNQ	7	18	1*	34	32	22	10	7	4	9	10	27	16	11	33	22	23	24	11	13	36	11	2773
16	Boris Said **(R)**	26	18	32	24	26	27	12	4	2	18	20	11	9	22	22	14	20	27	11	17	26	20	23	33	20	37	2657
17	Dave Rezendes	14	10	7	7	17	13	13	7	7	11	31	30	25	11	27	9	17	4	30			**21***	30		15	32	2613
18	Tony Roper **(R)**	32	29	12	36	23	15	9	19	20	17	33	17	20	13	25	33	9	17	24	27	21	17	13	14	24	27	2604
19	Bryan Reffner	21	31	31	34	21	24	20	8	30	10	11	13	23	15	19	15	21	29	19	15	29	32	32	32	30	38	2433
20	Tammy Jo Kirk **(R)**	24	DNQ	23	12	14	16	25	13	13	19	16	16	14	17	11	34	19	14	DNQ	30	DNQ			35		DNQ	2174
21	Doug George	18	25	17	20	19	17	11	26	29	36	17	19	26	29			24	DNQ	DNQ	DNQ		8	34	36	21	21	2057
22	Randy Tolsma **(R)**	DNQ	19	DNQ	DNQ		26	DNQ		8			31			15	6		32	32	9	14	18	1	5	33	30	1802
23	Mike Wallace												6	10	18	14	28	7	34	22	19	22	29	7	2	6	7	1788
24	Terry Cook **(R)**	DNQ	DNQ	DNQ	19			23	25	33	27	15	27	15	19	24	24	**18**	33	DNQ	DNQ	DNQ			23	28	DNQ	1651
25	Lance Norick	33	DNQ	10	15	20	31	DNQ	21	17	28	35	33			34				DNQ		DNQ	19	25	21	DNQ	14	1620
26	Kevin Harvick **(R)**		21											11	20	30	23	23	16	23	DNQ		33	8	20	34	8	1355
27	Tobey Butler	20	DNQ	20	18	9	11	29	27	18	35	34							12		35					12	DNQ	1355
28	Michael Dokken	35	**13***	35	28	29	3	26	31	24	23	5	32	17				22										1331
29	Rob Rizzo **(R)**	DNQ	6	16	DNQ	25		DNQ	39		16	30					30		30	31	DNQ		23	18	28	DNQ		1306
30	Brian Cunningham **(R)**			29	22	DNQ	DNQ		40		DNQ	19		21		28	25	28	DNQ	29			28		24	22	40	1265
31	Dan Press	28	32	14	27	18	21	28	30	26	21	12	25	28														1189
32	Lonnie Rush Jr. **(R)**	13	17	38	25	31	DNQ	19	28		24	32	18													29	35	1087
33	Bill Sedgwick					24	DNQ	18					DNQ	DNQ	24	32	22		DNQ			DNQ	DNQ	33	27			928
34	Kenny Allen	17	DNQ	15	23	30	20	21	22	28	38				28													911
35	Kelly Denton **(R)**	23	27	24	16						12										31	18		29				764
36	Barry Bodine			27															20		25	17			12	16	34	688
37	Bobby Dotter	16	23	DNQ	31				16				24					27								23		677
38	Curtis Markham	9	DNQ	33	13			16			34																20	651
39	Ron Barfield Jr.	8					12				29														19	27	29	618
40	Mike Cope **(R)**		DNQ	22				32	18			26	28	12														613
41	Ron Fellows										25					33				**1**			11	22				559
42	Eric Norris								37				22					DNQ	22	13	DNQ				31			553
43	Tom Hubert														23	31			28				2			11		543
44	Toby Porter **(R)**	22	11	DNQ	9	DNQ																						451
45	Andy Houston																18		24		DNQ	11				32	DNQ	441
46	Billy Pauch											21		DNQ				DNQ			20	25				DNQ		441
47	Mike Skinner			4											5	32											36	437
48	Ricky Johnson																			8			4		DNQ		17	414
49	Wayne Grubb								36					27							23	27			22			410
50	Brad Teague										13								25		24	19						409
51	Brandon Butler **(R)**				29	DNQ	29	17	35																			386
52	Ernie Irvan																				36	2			4			385
53	Blaise Alexander			DNQ							14								DNQ	9		DNQ						373
54	Randy MacDonald	19		25					33			29																371
55	T. J. Clark	DNQ	DNQ	DNQ	26	DNQ	28																				DNQ	367
56	Scot Walters							DNQ						7					26		29							362
57	Kenny Hendrick **(R)**	29	24						32	19																	DNQ	353
58	Rick McCray					32	22																27			31	DNQ	350
59	Rob Morgan															21				18			30			DNQ	DNQ	326
60	Jeff Spraker	DNQ							DNQ		37			DNQ			DNQ			20	DNQ	DNQ						320

== Rookie of the Year ==
Former sprint car driver Kenny Irwin Jr., driving the #98 for Liberty Racing, took home Rookie of the Year honors in 1997, winning two of the first nine races of the season, and finishing tenth in points. Runner-up was Rick Crawford, who had made his debut in a major NASCAR series that season and posted ten top-tens, while Stacy Compton finished 92 points behind him in the new Impact Motorsports ride. Tony Raines finished 15th in points and picked up a win as well, while Tony Roper had two top-tens, and Tammy Jo Kirk became the first female to make a start in the series. The rest of the candidates only made part-time bids at the award, the most notable being Randy Tolsma, who scored the lone victory of this group at Mesa Marin Raceway

== See also ==
- 1997 NASCAR Winston Cup Series
- 1997 NASCAR Busch Series
- 1997 NASCAR Winston West Series
- 1997 NASCAR Goody's Dash Series
