= 1994 Daytona 500 =

Auto race run in Florida in 1994

Race details
- Race 1 of 31 in the 1994 NASCAR Winston Cup Series season
- 1994 Daytona 500 program cover
- Date: February 20, 1994
- Location: Daytona International Speedway, Daytona Beach, Florida
- Course: Permanent racing facility 2.5 mi (4.02336 km)
- Distance: 200 laps, 500 mi (804.672 km)
- Weather: Mild with temperatures reaching up to 77 °F (25 °C); wind speeds approaching 14 miles per hour (23 km/h)
- Average speed: 156.931 miles per hour (252.556 km/h)

Pole position
Driver	Loy Allen Jr.	TriStar Motorsports

Qualifying race winners
Duel 1 Winner	Ernie Irvan	Robert Yates Racing
Duel 2 Winner	Dale Earnhardt	Richard Childress Racing

Most laps led
Driver	Ernie Irvan	Robert Yates Racing
- Laps: 84

Winner
No. 4	Sterling Marlin	Morgan–McClure Motorsports

Television in the United States
- Network: CBS
- Announcers: Ken Squier, Chris Economaki, and Ned Jarrett
- Nielsen ratings: 9.6/26 (13.6 million viewers)

Logo for the 1994 Daytona 500.

The 1994 Daytona 500, the 36th running of the event, was held February 20 at Daytona International Speedway, in Daytona Beach, Florida. Loy Allen Jr., ARCA graduate and Winston Cup rookie, driving the No. 19 for TriStar Motorsports, won the pole. Speedweeks 1994 was marked by tragedy when two drivers, Neil Bonnett and Rodney Orr, were killed in separate practice accidents for this race. Sterling Marlin in the Morgan–McClure Motorsports No. 4 won the race, the first win of his NASCAR career.

== Fatal crashes in practice sessions ==
During Speedweeks, on the first day of practice for the Daytona 500, legendary driver Neil Bonnett crashed in turn four. Bonnett died at Halifax Hospital from massive head injuries. Three days later, reigning Goody's Dash Series (NASCAR's four-cylinder class) champion, Rodney Orr, making his Cup debut, lost control and spun in turn two. His car flipped and hit the catch fence with the roof above the driver's seat. Orr was killed instantly. After the deaths of Bonnett and Orr, NASCAR Veteran Jimmy Means announced his retirement from driving. Following these tragedies, a worried Rusty Wallace gave a lecture, calling out the drivers for over-aggression on the track, during the pre-race Drivers Meeting. In his lecture, Wallace was extremely critical of the drivers taking bold risks such as gambling on their tires, making overly-aggressive moves early in the races, and not taking much time to fix any damages to their car on pit road. Wallace stopped for a short bit midway through his speech to give fellow driver Ken Schrader a chance to speak during his lecture with Schrader saying "we had a reality check this week." In conclusion, Wallace told the drivers, "Use your damn heads please!" He was given a round of applause from the drivers and teams after his lecture.

In the middle of the Goodyear-Hoosier tire war, Hoosier released teams from their contracts three days following Orr's death. Hoosier received blame from some observers as the tires were the only linking factor between the two deaths. However, the criticism was purely speculative and NASCAR never blamed the tires for the deaths and never offered an official cause of the accident for either fatality.

=== Suspension Issue Discovery ===
An investigation done by the Orlando Sentinel blamed Orr's crash on a broken right-rear shock absorber mounting bracket. That same part was reportedly broken on Bonnett's car. NASCAR refused to comment on the outside investigation. In order to reduce drag, teams were using extremely aggressive suspension packages with extremely soft shock absorbers and springs at Daytona and Talladega. The cars often bottomed out, creating sparks which became visible at Daytona during the October 1998 Firecracker 400, which had become a night race.

The combination of extremely soft shock absorbers and springs that bottomed out, along with aged pavement (last replaced in 1979, subsequently replaced in 2011 following a red flag in 2010 for pavement breaking up after 31 years) caused the mounting brackets to fail. Following injuries to drivers in 1996 (Elliott), 1997 (Martin), and 1998 (Irvan) from the excessively soft suspension, drivers noted to NASCAR about the dangers of the extremely soft suspension packages. During the October 1999 Cup Series race at Talladega, Joe Nemechek explained the setup safety issue at the post-qualifying press conference after winning pole position, saying, "Man, I feel like I've been inside a cement mixer. That setup really rattles your cage."

=== Related 1999 Rule Change ===
In 1999, NASCAR implemented rules in the second tier series for Daytona and Talladega mandating stiffer specification shock absorbers and springs supplied by the sanctioning body at Daytona and Talladega. At the opening of the garage when teams check in, teams arrive at the NASCAR trackside office and are randomly assigned shock absorbers and springs that must be returned to NASCAR at the end of the race. The rule was designed to stop the dangerous suspension setups that drivers had complained about and had caused numerous crashes.

NASCAR implemented the rule for all three national series in 2000 Daytona 500, where the Craftsman Truck Series would race at Daytona for the first time. Ken Schrader noted during winter testing the car handled better and rode smoother. This practice of mandatory shocks and springs at NASCAR offices is not used at other circuits. As of 2022, teams in the Cup Series are required to use specification shock absorbers and springs from seventh-generation specification supplier Öhlins for all races, and for all national series added Atlanta Motor Speedway to restrictor plate circuits that require teams to use standard specification shocks and springs from NASCAR at the series office.

== Summary ==
Rookie polesitter Loy Allen Jr. failed to lead the first lap. Ernie Irvan and Dale Earnhardt swapped the lead several times in the first 60 laps (which turned out to be a preview of the Championship battle), with Jeff Gordon leading briefly. The Big One happened on lap 62 when Chuck Bown and Kyle Petty touched in turn 4. Petty, Robert Pressley, John Andretti, and Rusty Wallace were done for the day. Hut Stricklin, Harry Gant, Bobby Hillin Jr., and rookie Jeff Burton, among others, were also involved. The race restarted with Daytona 500 rookie Todd Bodine in the lead. He was soon passed by Earnhardt and was then tagged by Gordon whom Todd thought he was clear of. Jimmy Spencer, Ted Musgrave, Brett Bodine, and Michael Waltrip were caught up in a chain reaction to Bodine's spin; Brett and Waltrip would continue.

=== The finish ===
The yellow flag was displayed with 60 laps to go for debris in Turn 2, which made for interesting fuel mileage strategy. Earnhardt, Irvan, and Mark Martin came into the pits again for extra fuel. 1990 winner Derrike Cope led the field at the restart, only to be passed by Marlin and Irvan a couple of laps later. Irvan took the lead with 43 laps to go, but on Lap 180 he suddenly got loose in turn 4. He recovered the car, but Marlin retook the lead as Irvan fell back to 7th. With 12 laps to go, Irvan was repassed by Martin, whom he had passed a few laps before, but with eight laps to go the Ford duo tag-teamed Jeff Gordon for 3rd and 4th. The two Fords swapped positions with five laps to go, and Irvan passed Terry Labonte (who was hung up behind Jimmy Hensley) in the tri-oval with three laps to go. But Sterling Marlin's Morgan–McClure Chevrolet was untouchable, and he finally won a Winston Cup race in his 279th start after eight 2nd-place finishes. He broke Dave Marcis' previous record for most starts before his first Cup win (227th start, at Martinsville in 1975). Martin ran out of fuel with two to go, but he managed to take the white flag to complete 199 laps.

== Race results ==
Pos	Grid	No.	Driver	Team	Manufacturer	Laps	Status	Laps led	Points
1	4	4	Sterling Marlin	Morgan–McClure Motorsports	Chevrolet	200	Running	30	180
2	3	28	Ernie Irvan (W)	Robert Yates Racing	Ford	200	Running	84	180
3	9	5	Terry Labonte	Hendrick Motorsports	Chevrolet	200	Running	1	170
4	6	24	Jeff Gordon	Hendrick Motorsports	Chevrolet	200	Running	7	165
5	12	21	Morgan Shepherd	Wood Brothers Racing	Ford	200	Running	7	160
6	31	77	Greg Sacks	U.S. Racing	Ford	200	Running	0	150
7	2	3	Dale Earnhardt	Richard Childress Racing	Chevrolet	200	Running	45	151
8	20	10	Ricky Rudd	Rudd Performance Motorsports	Ford	200	Running	0	142
9	8	11	Bill Elliott (W)	Junior Johnson & Associates	Ford	200	Running	0	138
10	13	25	Ken Schrader	Hendrick Motorsports	Chevrolet	200	Running	0	134
11	39	7	Geoff Bodine (W)	Geoff Bodine Racing	Ford	200	Running	1	135
12	23	40	Bobby Hamilton	Team SABCO	Pontiac	200	Running	2	132
13	7	6	Mark Martin	Roush Racing	Ford	199	Out of fuel	5	129
14	22	15	Lake Speed	Bud Moore Engineering	Ford	199	Running	0	121
15	25	55	Jimmy Hensley	RaDiUs Motorsports	Ford	199	Running	0	118
16	42	22	Bobby Labonte	Bill Davis Racing	Pontiac	199	Running	0	115
17	18	43	Wally Dallenbach Jr.	Petty Enterprises	Pontiac	199	Running	0	112
18	34	9	Joe Ruttman	Melling Racing	Ford	199	Running	0	109
19	28	80	Jimmy Horton	Hover Motorsports	Ford	199	Running	0	106
20	29	32	Dick Trickle	Active Motorsports	Ford	198	Running	0	103
21	16	98	Derrike Cope (W)	Cale Yarborough Motorsports	Ford	198	Running	7	105
22	1	19	Loy Allen Jr. #	TriStar Motorsports	Ford	198	Running	0	97
23	37	12	Chuck Bown	Bobby Allison Motorsports	Ford	198	Running	0	94
24	33	90	Bobby Hillin Jr.	Donlavey Racing	Ford	198	Running	0	91
25	27	71	Dave Marcis	Marcis Auto Racing	Chevrolet	198	Running	0	88
26	35	8	Jeff Burton #	Stavola Brothers Racing	Ford	197	Running	0	85
27	30	1	Rick Mast	Precision Products Racing	Ford	197	Running	0	82
28	32	17	Darrell Waltrip (W)	DarWal Inc.	Chevrolet	197	Running	0	79
29	17	97	Chad Little	Mark Rypien Motorsports	Ford	196	Running	1	81
30	40	95	Jeremy Mayfield #	Sadler Brothers Racing	Ford	195	Out of fuel	0	73
31	14	30	Michael Waltrip	Bahari Racing	Pontiac	194	Running	0	70
32	10	26	Brett Bodine	King Racing	Ford	185	Running	0	67
33	38	23	Hut Stricklin	Travis Carter Enterprises	Ford	174	Running	0	64
34	36	33	Harry Gant	Leo Jackson Motorsports	Chevrolet	165	Running	0	61
35	41	18	Dale Jarrett (W)	Joe Gibbs Racing	Chevrolet	146	Engine	3	63
36	11	75	Todd Bodine	Butch Mock Motorsports	Ford	79	Accident	7	60
37	21	27	Jimmy Spencer	Junior Johnson & Associates	Ford	79	Accident	0	52
38	24	16	Ted Musgrave	Roush Racing	Ford	79	Accident	0	49
39	26	42	Kyle Petty	Team SABCO	Pontiac	64	Accident	0	46
40	19	54	Robert Pressley	Leo Jackson Motorsports	Chevrolet	62	Accident	0	43
41	5	2	Rusty Wallace	Penske Racing South	Ford	61	Accident	0	40
42	15	14	John Andretti #	Hagan Racing	Chevrolet	47	Accident	0	37
Failed to Qualify
	43	89	Jim Sauter	Mueller Racing	Ford				
	44	41	Joe Nemechek #	Larry Hedrick Motorsports	Chevrolet				
	45	52	Brad Teague	Means Racing	Ford				
	46	45	Rich Bickle #	Isenhour Racing	Chevrolet				
	47	34	Bob Brevak	Brevak Racing	Ford				
	48	02	T. W. Taylor	Taylor Racing	Ford				
	49	0	Delma Cowart	H. L. Waters Racing	Ford				
	50	48	Trevor Boys	Hylton Racing	Pontiac				
	51	47	Billy Standridge #	Johnson Racing	Ford				
	52	56	Jerry Hill	Tierney Motorsports	Ford				
	53	74	Kerry Teague	KT Motorsports	Chevrolet				
	54	29	Steve Grissom #	Diamond Ridge Motorsports	Chevrolet				
	55	73	Phil Barkdoll	Barkdoll Racing	Chevrolet				
	56	20	Buddy Baker	Moroso Racing	Ford				
	57	53	Ritchie Petty	Petty Brothers Racing	Ford				
	58	61	Rick Carelli	Chesrown Racing	Chevrolet				
	59	31	Ward Burton #	A.G. Dillard Motorsports	Chevrolet				
	60	37	Rodney Orr #^{1}	Orr Motorsports	Ford				
	61	51	Neil Bonnett^{1}	Phoenix Racing	Chevrolet				
	62	57	Joe Ruttman^{2}	Bob Rahilly	Ford				
	63	62	Ronnie Sanders^{2}	Henley Gray	Ford				
	64	66	Mark Thompson^{2}	Mike Brandt	Ford				
	65	84	Norm Benning^{2}	Norm Benning Racing	Oldsmobile				
	66	84	Rick Crawford^{2}	Circle Bar Racing	Chevrolet				
	67	85	Scott Brayton^{2}	Mansion Motorsports	Ford				
	68	92	Brad Teague^{2}	Jimmy Means Racing	Ford				
	69	99	Danny Sullivan^{2}	Chris Virtue	Chevrolet				
# Rookie of the Year candidate / ^{1} Withdrawn due to driver fatality / ^{2} Withdrawn for other reasons Source:
