= Kroger 225 =

Former NASCAR truck race in Louisville, Kentucky

NASCAR Craftsman Truck Series
- Venue: Louisville Motor Speedway
- Corporate sponsor: Kroger
- First race: 1995
- Last race: 1999
- Distance: 98.4 miles (158.359 km)
- Laps: 225
- Previous names: Ford Credit 200 (1995); Ford Dealers 225 (1996); Link-Belt Construction Equipment 225 (1997); Kroger 225 (1998–1999)

The Kroger 225 was a NASCAR Craftsman Truck Series held at Louisville Motor Speedway in Louisville, Kentucky. The race was run from 1995 to 1999. Originally a 200-lap race in 1995, the race was increased to 225 laps the next year.

== Past winners ==
Year	Date	No.	Driver	Team	Manufacturer	Race Distance		Race Time	Average Speed (mph)	Ref
Year	Date	No.	Driver	Team	Manufacturer	Laps	Miles (km)	Race Time	Average Speed (mph)	Ref
1995	June 3	3	Mike Skinner	Richard Childress Racing	Chevrolet	200	87.5 (140.818)	1:19:05	66.386	
1996	July 20	16	Ron Hornaday Jr.	Dale Earnhardt, Inc.	Chevrolet	225	98.4 (158.359)	1:26:43	68.11	
1997	July 12	16	Ron Hornaday Jr.	Dale Earnhardt, Inc.	Chevrolet	225	98.4 (158.359)	1:26:30	68.358	
1998	August 29	19	Tony Raines	Roehrig Motorsports	Ford	225	98.4 (158.359)	1:40:38	58.758	
1999	October 8	3	Jay Sauter	Richard Childress Racing	Chevrolet	225	98.4 (158.359)	1:42:56	57.445	

=== Multiple winners (drivers) ===
# Wins	Driver	Years won	Ref
2	Ron Hornaday Jr.	1996, 1997	

=== Multiple winners (teams) ===
# Wins	Team	Years won	Ref
2	Dale Earnhardt, Inc.	1996, 1997	
2	Richard Childress Racing	1995, 1999	

=== Manufacturer wins ===
# Wins	Make	Years won	Ref
4	(United States) Chevrolet	1995, 1996, 1997, 1999	
1	(United States) Ford	1998	
