= NASCAR Camping World Truck Series at Sonoma Raceway =

NASCAR Truck Series race at Sonoma Raceway

DoorDash 250

Camping World Truck Series
- Venue: Sonoma Raceway
- Location: Sonoma, California
- Corporate sponsor: DoorDash
- First race: 1995
- Last race: 2022
- Distance: 149.25 miles (240.19 km)
- Laps: 75; Stage 1: 20; Stage 2: 25; Stage 3: 30
- Previous names: Subway 100 (1995); Kragen 151 (1996); Kragen/Exide 151 (1997–1998)
- Most wins (manufacturer): Ford (3)

Circuit information
- Surface: Asphalt
- Length: 1.990 mi (3.203 km)
- Turns: 12

The DoorDash 250 was an annual NASCAR Camping World Truck Series race at Sonoma Raceway.

The race was previously held during the first four years of the Truck Series (from 1995 to 1998), but was dropped for 1999 as the series' second road course date moved to Portland International Raceway. At the time, the track was known as Sears Point International Raceway and the race was held in October as a standalone race from the Cup Series schedule.

== History ==
The Truck Series (and the Cup Series) used this layout of the track with the carousel in 1995, 1996 and 1997 races at the track. The chute was used instead in 1998 and 2022.

The 2022 Truck Series schedule was released on September 29 with Sonoma on Saturday, June 11. It replaced the race at the Watkins Glen road course, which had been added back on the Truck Series schedule in 2021 for the first time since 2000.

The 2022 race was 75 laps and 149.25 miles in length according to NASCAR.com. Stage 1, won by Ty Majeski, was 20 laps in length. Stage 2, won by Ben Rhodes, was 25 laps in length. The final stage was 30 laps in length.

== Past winners ==
Year	Date	No.	Driver	Team	Manufacturer	Race distance		Race time	Average speed (mph)	Report	Ref
Year	Date	No.	Driver	Team	Manufacturer	Laps	Miles (km)	Race time	Average speed (mph)	Report	Ref
2.52 miles (4.06 km) Layout
1995	October 7	16	Ron Hornaday Jr.	Dale Earnhardt, Inc.	Chevrolet	40	100.800 (162.222)	1:29:07	67.866	Report	
1996	October 5	7	Dave Rezendes	Geoff Bodine Racing	Ford	60	151.200 (243.333)	2:15:24	67.001	Report	
1997	October 5	80	Joe Ruttman	Roush Racing	Ford	60	151.200 (243.333)	2:24:35	70.199	Report	
1.949 miles (3.137 km) Layout
1998	October 11	44	Boris Said	Irvan-Simo Racing	Ford	77	150.073 (241.519)	2:03:27	72.939	Report	
1999 – 2021	Not held										
1.99 miles (3.20 km) Layout
2022	June 11	51	Kyle Busch	Kyle Busch Motorsports	Toyota	75	149.25 (240.19)	2:10:31	68.612	Report	

=== Manufacturer wins ===
# Wins	Make	Years won
3	(United States) Ford	1996, 1997, 1998
1	(United States) Chevrolet	1995
1	(Japan) Toyota	2022
