= O'Reilly Auto Parts 200 (I-70) =

NASCAR Craftsman Truck Series
- Venue: I-70 Speedway
- Location: Odessa, Missouri, United States
- First race: 1995
- Last race: 1999
- Distance: 108.6 miles (174.8 km)
- Laps: 200
- Previous names: Western Auto 200 (1995–1996); Western Auto/Parts America 200 (1997); Yellow Freight 200 (1998)
- Most wins (driver): Tony Raines (2)
- Most wins (team): Roehrig Motorsports (2)
- Most wins (manufacturer): Chevrolet; Ford (2)

Circuit information
- Surface: Asphalt
- Length: 0.543 mi (0.874 km)
- Turns: 4

The O'Reilly Auto Parts 200 was a NASCAR Craftsman Truck Series race that took place at I-70 Speedway in Lafayette County, Missouri. The race was held from 1995 to 1999.

In 1997, Tony Raines won his first NASCAR race here.

== Past winners ==
Year	Date	No.	Driver	Team	Manufacturer	Race Distance		Race Time	Average Speed (mph)	Report	Ref
Year	Date	No.	Driver	Team	Manufacturer	Laps	Miles (km)	Race Time	Average Speed (mph)	Report	Ref
1995	May 27	3	Mike Skinner	Richard Childress Racing	Chevrolet	200	108.600 (174.775)	1:30:20	64.309	Report	
1996	July 27	2	Mike Bliss	Ultra Motorsports	Ford	200	108.600 (174.775)	1:23:29	78.052	Report	
1997	May 24	19	Tony Raines	Roehrig Motorsports	Dodge	200	108.600 (174.775)	1:18:46	82.725	Report	
1998	May 23	19	Tony Raines	Roehrig Motorsports	Ford	200	108.600 (174.775)	1:37:49	66.614	Report	
1999	May 22	24	Jack Sprague	Hendrick Motorsports	Chevrolet	204*	110.772 (178.270)	1:34:40	70.208	Report	

- 1999: Race extended due to a green–white–checker finish.
