= Terry McCarthy (racing driver) =

American racing driver

- Born: January 7, 1964 (age 62); Mountain View, California, U.S.
- Achievements: 1994 SCCA E Production Champion

NASCAR FedEx Freight Truck Series career
- 2 races run over 1 year
- Best finish: 74th (1996)
- First race: 1996 Florida Dodge Dealers 400 (Homestead)
- Last race: 1996 Chevy Desert Star Classic (Phoenix)
Wins	Top tens	Poles
0	1	0

Terry M. McCarthy (born January 7, 1964) is an American stock car, sports car and touring car racing driver. He is a former competitor in the NASCAR Craftsman Truck Series and Featherlite Southwest Tour. He won the first national sports car championship to be captured by the driver of a Mazda Miata in 1994.

== Career ==
A native of Mountain View, California, McCarthy established a successful career in local and amateur racing, including winning the 1994 Sports Car Club of America E Production National Championship; this was the first E Production national championship won by a driver competing in a Mazda Miata.

In 1996, McCarthy moved up to the NASCAR Craftsman Truck Series, making two starts at the start of the season driving the No. 27 Chevrolet for B&R Racing. Registered as a competitor for Cintas Rookie of the Year honors, McCarthy finished sixth in his first race in the series at Homestead–Miami Speedway, where he improved 23 positions from his starting position during the race. In the following race at Phoenix Raceway, McCarthy was involved in a four-truck accident on the seventh lap of the race; a lack of sponsorship meant that that became the final Truck Series race of the season for him, and would also prove to be the final Truck Series race of his career. McCarthy would attempt one Truck Series race in 1997, at the Homestead–Miami Speedway, but failed to qualify the No. 51 Chevrolet.

Following his aborted Truck Series career, McCarthy went on to compete for a number of years in the Featherlite Southwest Tour, a regional NASCAR touring series, as well as the Sports Car Club of America SpeedVision World Challenge touring car series, and the Mazdaspeed Miata Cup.

== Motorsports career results ==
=== NASCAR ===
(key) (Bold – Pole position awarded by qualifying time. Italics – Pole position earned by points standings or practice time. * – Most laps led.)

==== Craftsman Truck Series ====
NASCAR Craftsman Truck Series results
Year	Team	No.	Make	1	2	3	4	5	6	7	8	9	10	11	12	13	14	15	16	17	18	19	20	21	22	23	24	25	26	NCTC	Pts
1996	B&R Racing	27	Chevy	HOM; 6	PHO; 33	POR	EVG	TUS	CNS	HPT	BRI	NZH	MLW	LVL	I70	IRP	FLM	GLN	NSV	RCH	NHA	MAR	NWS	SON	MMR	PHO	LVS			74th	214
1997	Rosenblum Racing	51	Chevy	WDW	TUS	HOM; DNQ	PHO	POR	EVG	I70	NHA	TEX	BRI	NZH	MLW	LVL	CNS	HPT	IRP	FLM	NSV	GLN	RCH	MAR	SON	MMR	CAL	PHO	LVS	172nd	4
