= Mike Hurlbert =

American racing driver (born 1959)

- Born: April 3, 1959 (age 67); Lynden, Washington, U.S.

NASCAR FedEx Freight Truck Series career
- 22 races run over 3 years
- Best finish: 25th (1995), (1996)
- First race: 1995 Skoal Bandit Copper World Classic (Phoenix)
- Last race: 1996 Ford Dealers / Ford Credit 300 (Mesa Marin)
| Wins | Top tens | Poles |
|---|---|---|
| 0 | 0 | 0 |
- Statistics up to date as of January 4, 2025.

Mike Hurlbert (born April 3, 1959) is an American former professional stock car racing driver and team owner who has competed in the NASCAR Craftsman Truck Series from 1995 to 1997, getting a best finish of sixteenth in three races of the former year. He is the current owner of RPM Racing, which fields various entries in off-road racing events.

Hurlbert has also previously competed in the NASCAR Winston West Series.

== Motorsports results ==
=== NASCAR ===
(key) (Bold - Pole position awarded by qualifying time. Italics - Pole position earned by points standings or practice time. * – Most laps led.)

==== Craftsman Truck Series ====
NASCAR Craftsman Truck Series results
| Year | Team | No. | Make | 1 | 2 | 3 | 4 | 5 | 6 | 7 | 8 | 9 | 10 | 11 | 12 | 13 | 14 | 15 | 16 | 17 | 18 | 19 | 20 | 21 | 22 | 23 | 24 | 25 | 26 | NCTC | Pts | Ref |
|---|---|---|---|---|---|---|---|---|---|---|---|---|---|---|---|---|---|---|---|---|---|---|---|---|---|---|---|---|---|---|---|---|
| 1995 | RPM Racing | 11 | Ford | PHO; 26 | TUS; 16 | SGS; DNQ | MMR; DNQ | POR; 26 | EVG; 25 | I70; 16 | LVL; 20 | BRI | MLW | CNS; 16 | HPT | IRP | FLM | RCH | MAR | NWS | SON; 21 | MMR; 21 | PHO; 24 | | | | | | | 25th | 1146 | |
| 1996 | RPM Racing | 11 | Ford | HOM; DNQ | PHO | POR; 30 | EVG; 32 | TUS | CNS; DNQ | HPT | BRI; 32 | NZH; 33 | MLW; 34 | LVL | I70; 28 | IRP; 33 | FLM; DNQ | GLN; 31 | NSV; 27 | RCH | NHA; 30 | MAR; DNQ | NWS; DNQ | SON; 32 | MMR; 25 | PHO; DNQ | LVS; DNQ | | | 25th | 1081 | |
| 1997 | RPM Racing | 11 | Ford | WDW | TUS; DNQ | HOM | PHO | POR | EVG | I70 | NHA | TEX | BRI | NZH | MLW | LVL | CNS | HPT | IRP | FLM | NSV | GLN | RCH | MAR | SON | MMR | CAL | PHO | LVS | 157th | 28 | |

==== Winston West Series ====
NASCAR Winston West Series results
| Year | Team | No. | Make | 1 | 2 | 3 | 4 | 5 | 6 | 7 | 8 | 9 | 10 | 11 | 12 | 13 | 14 | Pos. | Pts | Ref |
|---|---|---|---|---|---|---|---|---|---|---|---|---|---|---|---|---|---|---|---|---|
| 1993 | Bill Strope | 16 | Ford | TWS | MMR | SGS | SON | TUS | SHA | EVG; 9 | POR | CBS | SSS | CAJ | TCR | MMR | PHO | 43rd | 138 | |
