= Dave Rezendes =

American racing driver (born 1959)

David Rezendes
- Born: October 5, 1959 (age 67); Assonet, Massachusetts, U.S.

NASCAR O'Reilly Auto Parts Series career
- 140 races run over 8 years
- Best finish: 16th (1989, 1990)
- First race: 1988 Budweiser 200 (Dover)
- Last race: 1998 Lysol 200 (Watkins Glen)
Wins	Top tens	Poles
0	21	0

NASCAR FedEx Freight Truck Series career
- 64 races run over 4 years
- Best finish: 6th (1996)
- First race: 1995 Racing Champions 200 (Tucson)
- Last race: 1998 Loadhandler 200 (Bristol)
- First win: 1996 Florida Dodge Dealers 400 (Homestead-Miami)
- Last win: 1996 Kragen 151 (Sears Point)
Wins	Top tens	Poles
3	29	1

Dave Rezendes (born October 5, 1959) is an American former NASCAR driver. He competed in the Busch Series from 1988 until 1994. He joined NASCAR's Craftsman Truck Series in its first season in 1995. Rezendes had his best season in 1996, when he won his only three races and finished sixth in the series points. Also in 1996, Rezendes made his only step into NASCAR's top division, qualifying Geoff Bodine's number 7 car at Sonoma (then called Sears Point). He has never attempted a Cup Series race.

Rezendes stopped racing trucks during the 1998 after the ninth race of the season, and returned to the Busch Series for seven more races for two teams near the end of the season. He has not competed in NASCAR since then.

== Motorsports career results ==
=== NASCAR ===
(key) (Bold – Pole position awarded by qualifying time. Italics – Pole position earned by points standings or practice time. * – Most laps led.)

==== Winston Cup Series ====
NASCAR Winston Cup Series results
Year	Team	No.	Make	1	2	3	4	5	6	7	8	9	10	11	12	13	14	15	16	17	18	19	20	21	22	23	24	25	26	27	28	29	30	31	NWCC	Pts	Ref
1996	Geoff Bodine Racing	7	Ford	DAY	CAR	RCH	ATL	DAR	BRI	NWS	MAR	TAL	SON; QL^{†}	CLT	DOV	POC	MCH	DAY	NHA	POC	TAL	IND	GLN	MCH	BRI	DAR	RCH	DOV	MAR	NWS	CLT	CAR	PHO	ATL	NA	-	
^{†} - Qualified for Geoff Bodine

==== Busch Series ====
NASCAR Busch Series results
Year	Team	No.	Make	1	2	3	4	5	6	7	8	9	10	11	12	13	14	15	16	17	18	19	20	21	22	23	24	25	26	27	28	29	30	31	NBGNC	Pts	Ref
1988	K.R. Rezendes, Inc.	79	Olds	DAY	HCY	CAR	MAR	DAR	BRI	LNG	NZH	SBO	NSV	CLT	DOV; 14	ROU	LAN	LVL	MYB	OXF	SBO	HCY	LNG	IRP	ROU	BRI	DAR	RCH	DOV	MAR	CLT; 27	CAR; 10	MAR		51st	337	
1989	K.R. Rezendes, Inc.	79	Olds	DAY	CAR; 13	MAR	HCY; 16	DAR; 34	BRI; 20	NZH; 7	SBO; 24	LAN; 21	NSV; 21	CLT; 26	DOV; 36	ROU	LVL; 22	VOL; 10	MYB; 12	SBO; 13	HCY; 19	DUB; 20	IRP; 28	ROU; 13	BRI; 19	DAR; 13	RCH; 12	DOV; 32	MAR; 7	CLT	CAR; 14	MAR; 31			16th	2635	
1990	K.R. Rezendes, Inc.	79	Olds	DAY; 16	RCH; 27	CAR; 20	MAR; 22	HCY	DAR; 38	BRI; 20	LAN; 6	SBO; 27	NZH; 2	HCY; 29	CLT; 26	DOV; 22	ROU; 2	VOL; 10	MYB; 18	OXF; 5	NHA; 44	SBO; 12	DUB; 6	IRP; 9	ROU; 11	BRI; 4	DAR; 30	RCH; 25	DOV; 28	MAR; 15	CLT; 38	NHA; 17	CAR; 28	MAR; 19	16th	3217	
1991	K.R. Rezendes, Inc.	79	Olds	DAY; 17	RCH; 25	CAR; 23	MAR; 15	VOL; 18	HCY; 21	DAR; 32	BRI; 14	LAN; 15	SBO; 9	NZH; 17	CLT; 22		ROU; 14	HCY; 26	MYB; 20	GLN; 27	OXF; 18	NHA; 18	SBO; 15	DUB; 14	IRP; 20	ROU; 20	BRI; 20	DAR; 9	RCH; 17	DOV; 37	CLT; 33	NHA; 46	CAR; 11	MAR; 9	17th	3172	
1991	K.R. Rezendes, Inc.	79	Chevy													DOV; 27																			17th	3172	
1992	K.R. Rezendes, Inc.	79	Olds	DAY; 38	CAR	RCH; 19	ATL	MAR; 9	DAR	BRI	HCY	LAN	DUB	NZH	CLT; 11	DOV	ROU	MYB	GLN; 5	VOL	NHA; 42	TAL	IRP	ROU	MCH; 14	NHA; 19	BRI	DAR	RCH	DOV	CLT; 8	MAR; 15	CAR; 10	HCY	32nd	1236	
1993	K.R. Rezendes, Inc.	79	Ford	DAY; 23	CAR; 41	RCH; 22	DAR	BRI	HCY	ROU	MAR	NZH	CLT; 32	DOV	MYB	GLN; 38	MLW	TAL	IRP	MCH	NHA	BRI; 9	DAR; 25	RCH; DNQ	DOV	ROU	CLT; 24	MAR; 25	CAR; 27	HCY; 16	ATL				38th	949	
1994	K.R. Rezendes, Inc.	79	Ford	DAY; DNQ	CAR; 33	RCH; 32	ATL; DNQ	MAR; DNQ	DAR; 39	HCY; 18	BRI; 22	ROU; 17	NHA; DNQ	NZH; 17	CLT; 33	DOV; 31	MYB; 12	GLN; 21	MLW; 21	SBO; 9	TAL; 18	HCY; 27	IRP; DNQ	MCH; 14	BRI	DAR; 33	RCH; 33	DOV; 26	CLT; 25	MAR; 27	CAR; 24				22nd	1992	
1998	Washington-Erving Motorsports	50	Ford	DAY	CAR	LVS	NSV	DAR	BRI	TEX	HCY	TAL	NHA	NZH	CLT	DOV	RCH	PPR	GLN; 14	MLW	MYB	CAL	SBO; 30	IRP; 26	MCH; 35	BRI; 12	DAR								59th	464	
1998	Mark III Racing	78	Chevy																									RCH; DNQ	DOV; 35	CLT; 14	GTY	CAR	ATL	HOM	59th	464	

==== Craftsman Truck Series ====
NASCAR Craftsman Truck Series results
Year	Team	No.	Make	1	2	3	4	5	6	7	8	9	10	11	12	13	14	15	16	17	18	19	20	21	22	23	24	25	26	27	NCTC	Pts	Ref
1995	Geoff Bodine Racing	7	Ford	PHO	TUS; 10	SGS	MMR; 19	POR	EVG; 7	I70; 2	LVL; 15	BRI	MLW; 8	CNS; 5	HPT; 26	IRP	FLM; 9	RCH	MAR	NWS	SON; 9	MMR									19th	1453	
1995	Geoff Bodine Racing	07	Ford																				PHO; 14								19th	1453	
1996	Geoff Bodine Racing	7	Ford	HOM; 1	PHO; 22	POR; 32	EVG; 11	TUS; 8	CNS; 5	HPT; 9	BRI; 2	NZH; 12	MLW; 8	LVL; 4	I70; 9	IRP; 16	FLM; 4	GLN; 23	NSV; 1	RCH; 11	NHA; 23	MAR; 12	NWS; 32	SON; 1*	MMR; 10	PHO; 22	LVS; 5				6th	3179	
1997	Geoff Bodine Racing	7	Ford	WDW; 14	TUS; 10																										17th	2613	
1997	Charles Hardy Motorsports	35	Chevy			HOM; 7	PHO; 7	POR; 17	EVG; 13	I70; 13	NHA; 7	TEX; 7	BRI; 11	NZH; 31	MLW; 30	LVL; 25	CNS; 11	HPT; 27	IRP; 9	FLM; 17	NSV; 4	GLN; 30	RCH	MAR							17th	2613	
1997	Gloy/Rahal Racing	55	Ford																						**SON**; 21*	MMR; 30	CAL	PHO; 15	LVS; 32		17th	2613	
1998	Gloy/Rahal Racing	55	Ford	WDW; 31	HOM; 9	PHO; 18	POR; 17	EVG	I70	GLN																					39th	662	
1998	Mike Skinner Racing	5	Chevy								TEX; 8																				39th	662	
1998	Ultra Motorsports	2	Ford									BRI; 24	MLW	NZH	CAL	PPR	IRP	NHA	FLM	NSV	HPT	LVL	RCH	MEM	GTY	MAR	SON	MMR	PHO	LVS	39th	662	
