= Dan Press =

American racing driver (1949–2015)

- Born: January 30, 1949; Vader, Washington, U.S.
- Died: November 5, 2015 (aged 66)

NASCAR FedEx Freight Truck Series career
- 19 races run over 2 years
- Best finish: 31st (1997)
- First race: 1996 Craftsman 200 (Portland)
- Last race: 1997 Link-Belt Construction Equipment 225 (Louisville)
Wins	Top tens	Poles
0	1	0
- Statistics up to date as of January 4, 2025.

Dan Press (born January 30, 1949 – November 5, 2015) was an American professional stock car racing driver and team owner who has competed in the NASCAR Craftsman Truck Series from 1996 to 1997, getting a best finish of third at Evergreen Speedway in the former year. He was a former competitor of the NASCAR Southwest Series, having won the championship in 1988.

Press also competed in the NASCAR Winston West Series, the NASCAR Northwest Series, and the Western States Open Competition Series.

== Motorsports results ==
=== NASCAR ===
(key) (Bold - Pole position awarded by qualifying time. Italics - Pole position earned by points standings or practice time. * – Most laps led.)

==== Craftsman Truck Series ====
NASCAR Craftsman Truck Series results
Year	Team	No.	Make	1	2	3	4	5	6	7	8	9	10	11	12	13	14	15	16	17	18	19	20	21	22	23	24	25	26	NCTC	Pts	Ref
1996	Dan Press	53	Chevy	HOM	PHO	POR; 29	EVG; 3	TUS; 12	CNS; 27	HPT	BRI	NZH	MLW	LVL	I70	IRP	FLM	GLN	NSV	RCH	NHA	MAR; DNQ	NWS; 33	SON	MMR; 24	PHO	LVS			38th	657	
1997	Spears Motorsports	75	Chevy	WDW; 28	TUS; 32	HOM; 14	PHO; 27	POR; 18	EVG; 21	I70; 28	NHA; 30	TEX; 26	BRI; 21	NZH; 12	MLW; 25	LVL; 28	CNS	HPT	IRP	FLM	NSV	GLN	RCH	MAR	SON	MMR	CAL	PHO	LVS	31st	1189	

==== Winston West Series ====
NASCAR Winston West Series results
Year	Team	No.	Make	1	2	3	4	5	6	7	8	9	10	11	12	13	14	15	Pos.	Pts	Ref
1996	Dan Press	53	Chevy	TUS; 8	AMP; 5	MMR; 3	SON	MAD	POR	TUS	EVG	CNS	MAD	MMR	SON	MMR	PHO	LVS	23rd	462	
