= Perry Tripp =

American racing driver

- Born: February 1, 1956 (age 70); Fredericktown, Missouri, U.S.

NASCAR O'Reilly Auto Parts Series career
- 3 races run over 2 years
- Best finish: 94th (1998)
- First race: 1997 AC-Delco 200 (Rockingham)
- Last race: 1998 Carquest Auto Parts 250 (Gateway)
Wins	Top tens	Poles
0	0	0

NASCAR FedEx Freight Truck Series career
- 1 race run over 2 years
- Best finish: 125th (1996)
- First race: 1996 DeVilbiss Superfinish 200 (Nazareth)
Wins	Top tens	Poles
0	0	0

ARCA Menards Series career
- 74 races run over 9 years
- Best finish: 7th (1996)
- First race: 1991 Michigan ARCA 200 (Michigan)
- Last race: 2004 Allen Crowe Memorial ARCA 100 (Springfield)
Wins	Top tens	Poles
0	18	0
- Statistics up to date as of December 16, 2024.

Perry Tripp (born February 1, 1956) is an American former professional stock car racing driver who has competed in the NASCAR Busch Series, the NASCAR Craftsman Truck Series, and the ARCA Re/Max Series.

Tripp has also previously competed in the NASCAR Sportsman Division and the USAC National Midget Series.

== Motorsports results ==
=== NASCAR ===
(key) (Bold - Pole position awarded by qualifying time. Italics - Pole position earned by points standings or practice time. * – Most laps led.)

==== Busch Series ====
NASCAR Busch Series results
Year	Team	No.	Make	1	2	3	4	5	6	7	8	9	10	11	12	13	14	15	16	17	18	19	20	21	22	23	24	25	26	27	28	29	30	31	NBSC	Pts	Ref
1997	Ray DeWitt	66	Ford	DAY	CAR	RCH	ATL	LVS	DAR	HCY	TEX	BRI	NSV	TAL	NHA	NZH	CLT	DOV	SBO	GLN	MLW	MYB	GTY; DNQ	IRP	MCH	BRI	DAR	RCH	DOV	CLT	CAL				120th	37	
1997	Wellrich Motorsports	7	Chevy																													CAR; 42	HOM		120th	37	
1998	Wellrich Motorsports	7	Chevy	DAY	CAR	LVS	NSV	DAR	BRI	TEX	HCY	TAL	NHA	NZH	CLT	DOV	RCH	PPR; 39	GLN	MLW	MYB	CAL	SBO	IRP	MCH	BRI	DAR	RCH	DOV	CLT	GTY; 29	CAR	ATL	HOM	94th	122	

==== Craftsman Truck Series ====
NASCAR Craftsman Truck Series results
Year	Team	No.	Make	1	2	3	4	5	6	7	8	9	10	11	12	13	14	15	16	17	18	19	20	21	22	23	24	25	26	NCTC	Pts	Ref
1996	Rosenblum Racing	51	Chevy	HOM	PHO	POR	EVG	TUS	CNS	HPT	BRI	NZH; 35	MLW	LVL	I70	IRP	FLM	GLN	NSV	RCH	NHA	MAR	NWS	SON	MMR	PHO	LVS; DNQ			125th	62	
1996	Rosenblum Racing	51	Chevy	WDW; DNQ	TUS	HOM	PHO	POR	EVG	I70	NHA	TEX	BRI	NZH	MLW	LVL	CNS	HPT	IRP	FLM	NSV	GLN	RCH	MAR	SON	MMR	CAL	PHO		154th	32	
1996	MB Motorsports	26	Ford																										LVS; DNQ	154th	32	

=== ARCA Re/Max Series ===
(key) (Bold – Pole position awarded by qualifying time. Italics – Pole position earned by points standings or practice time. * – Most laps led. ** – All laps led.)

ARCA Re/Max Series results
Year	Team	No.	Make	1	2	3	4	5	6	7	8	9	10	11	12	13	14	15	16	17	18	19	20	21	22	23	24	25	ARMSC	Pts	Ref
1991	N/A	71	Olds	DAY	ATL	KIL	TAL	TOL	FRS	POC	MCH	KIL	FRS	DEL	POC	TAL	HPT	MCH; 40	ISF	TOL	DSF	TWS	ATL						N/A	0	
1992	N/A	71	Olds	DAY	FIF	TWS; 25	TAL	TOL	KIL	POC	MCH; 28	FRS	KIL	NSH	DEL	POC	HPT; 28	FRS	ISF	TOL									N/A	0	
1992	Turpin Racing	1	Olds																		DSF; 16	TWS	SLM	ATL					N/A	0	
1993	Garry Harrison	33	Olds	DAY	FIF	TWS	TAL	KIL	CMS	FRS	TOL	POC	MCH	FRS	POC	KIL	ISF	DSF; 35	TOL	SLM; 18	WIN; 16	ATL							N/A	0	
1994	Garry Harrison	33	Chrysler	DAY	TAL	FIF; 12																							12th	2630	
1994	Garry Harrison	33	Olds				LVL; 12	KIL	TOL; 13	FRS; 19		DMS; 19	POC	POC	KIL; 19	FRS; 16	INF; 9	I70; 15	ISF; 33	DSF	TOL; 17	SLM; 17	WIN; 22	ATL					12th	2630	
1994	Garry Harrison	31	Olds								MCH; 16																		12th	2630	
1995	Keith Whitehead Racing	6	Chevy	DAY; 30		TAL; 40																		ATL; 38					9th	4245	
1995	Keith Whitehead Racing	6	Olds		ATL; 21		FIF; 9	KIL; 10		MCH; 9	I80; 16	MCS; 16	FRS; 20	POC; 14	POC; 22	KIL; 11	FRS; 26	SBS; 9	LVL; 8	ISF; 4	DSF; 24	SLM; 13	WIN; 10						9th	4245	
1995	Ken Schrader Racing	52	Olds						FRS; 27																				9th	4245	
1996	Keith Whitehead Racing	6	Chevy	DAY; 37	ATL; 12	SLM; 5	TAL; 25	FIF; 18	LVL; 12	CLT; 10	CLT; 10	KIL; 11	FRS; 10	POC; 27	MCH; 4	FRS; 5	TOL; 17	POC; 22	MCH; 3	INF; 36	SBS	ISF; 25	DSF; 19	KIL	SLM; 17	WIN	CLT; 6	ATL; 20	7th	4145	
1997	Keith Whitehead Racing	6	Chevy	DAY; 40	ATL; 3	SLM	CLT; 6	CLT; 15	POC	MCH; 22	SBS	TOL	KIL	FRS	MIN	POC	MCH	DSF	GTW; 11	SLM	WIN	CLT; 27	TAL; DNQ	ISF	ATL				N/A	0	
2003	Perry Tripp Motorsports	38	Chevy	DAY	ATL	NSH	SLM	TOL	KEN	CLT	BLN	KAN	MCH	LER	POC	POC	NSH	ISF	WIN	DSF; 15	CHI	SLM	TAL	CLT	SBO				135th	155	
2004	Wayne Peterson Racing	6	Chevy	DAY	NSH	SLM	KEN	TOL	CLT	KAN	POC	MCH	SBO	BLN	KEN	GTW	POC	LER	NSH	ISF; 25	TOL	DSF	CHI	SLM	TAL				157th	105	
