= John Nemechek =

American racing driver (1970–1997)

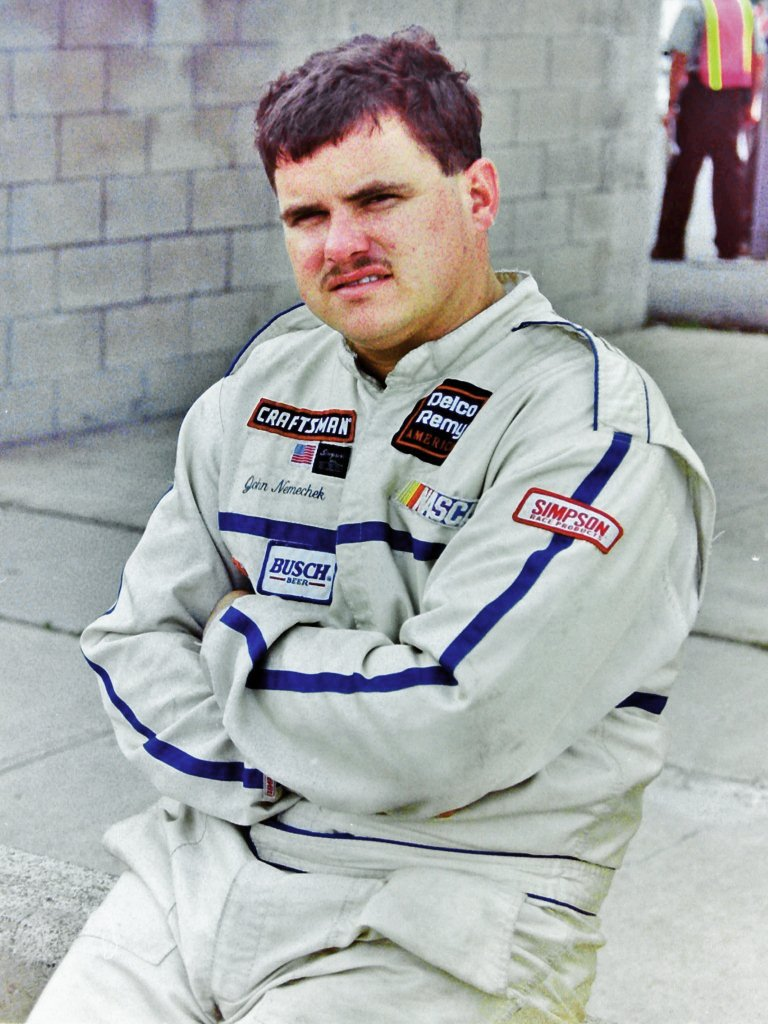
- Nemechek in 1996
- Born: John Frank Nemechek; March 12, 1970; Lakeland, Florida, U.S.
- Died: March 21, 1997 (aged 27); Homestead, Florida, U.S.
- Cause of death: Racing accident

NASCAR O'Reilly Auto Parts Series career
- 1 race run over 1 year
- Best finish: 92nd (1994)
- First race: 1994 Kroger 200 (IRP)
Wins	Top tens	Poles
0	0	0

NASCAR FedEx Freight Truck Series career
- 43 races run over 3 years
- Best finish: 13th (1996)
- First race: 1995 Skoal Bandit Copper World Classic (Phoenix)
- Last race: 1997 Florida Dodge Dealers 400 (Homestead)
Wins	Top tens	Poles
0	4	0

John Frank Nemechek (March 12, 1970 – March 21, 1997) was an American racing driver who competed in the NASCAR Craftsman Truck Series.

== Life and racing career ==
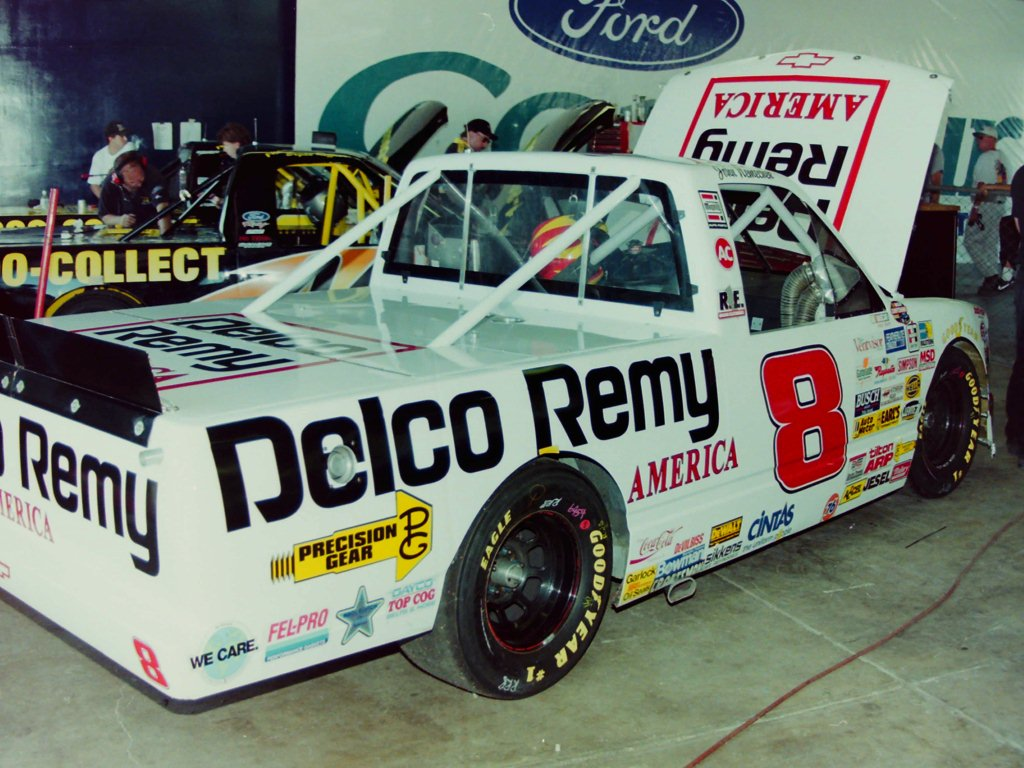
Nemechek's 1996 truck

The younger brother of four-time NASCAR Cup Series race winner Joe Nemechek, John followed his brother into racing, participating in his first race at the age of twelve in an 80 class dirtbike race. After a quick progression to the 250cc class, he moved onto mini-stock cars, where he raced against his brother, and eventually late-model stocks.

When he was not racing, Nemechek served as the front-tire changer on Joe's pit crew, and was on Joe's 1992 NASCAR Busch Series championship-winning team. He would begin attempting NASCAR races himself, and ran one Busch race at IRP in 1994. He finished 30th after his No. 89 Chevrolet suffered an engine failure. The following season, he began racing in the new Craftsman Truck Series, driving at first for Redding Motorsports, and then for his brother's NEMCO Motorsports. In the first year of competition, Nemechek ran 16 races and had two top-ten finishes. He followed that up with two more top-tens in 1996 and a thirteenth-place finish in points, running a single truck he built himself titled the War Wagon under his own team, Chek Racing.

== Death ==
On March 16, 1997, Nemechek was running a Truck Series race at Homestead-Miami Speedway when with 23 laps to go, he lost control and struck the first-turn wall, driver's side first, and hit his head on the wall, suffering head injuries. He was extracted and transported to a hospital, where he died five days later.

== Legacy ==
Following the incident, Homestead was reconfigured into a true oval with a six-degree banking to reduce the possibility of the type of crash that killed Nemechek. His brother Joe won a Busch Series race that November at the reconfigured circuit; he later named his son John Hunter after his late brother.

In 1999, when Joe won his first Cup Race at New Hampshire, he paid tribute to John over the radio while he took the checkered flag:

"This is for my brother John. I love you."

== Motorsports career results ==
=== NASCAR ===
(key) (Bold – Pole position awarded by qualifying time. Italics – Pole position earned by points standings or practice time. * – Most laps led.)

==== Busch Series ====
NASCAR Busch Series results
Year	Team	No.	Make	1	2	3	4	5	6	7	8	9	10	11	12	13	14	15	16	17	18	19	20	21	22	23	24	25	26	27	28	NBGNC	Pts	Ref
1994	NEMCO Motorsports	89	Chevy	DAY	CAR	RCH	ATL	MAR	DAR	HCY	BRI	ROU	NHA	NZH	CLT	DOV	MYB	GLN	MLW	SBO	TAL	HCY	IRP; 30	MCH	BRI	DAR	RCH	DOV	CLT	MAR	CAR	92nd	73	
1996	NEMCO Motorsports	89	Chevy	DAY	CAR; DNQ	RCH; DNQ	ATL	NSV	DAR	BRI	HCY	NZH	CLT	DOV	SBO	MYB	GLN	MLW	NHA	TAL	IRP	MCH	BRI	DAR	RCH	DOV	CLT	CAR	HOM			NA	0	

==== Craftsman Truck Series ====
NASCAR Craftsman Truck Series results
Year	Team	No.	Make	1	2	3	4	5	6	7	8	9	10	11	12	13	14	15	16	17	18	19	20	21	22	23	24	25	26	NCTC	Pts	Ref
1995	Redding Motorsports	89	Chevy	PHO; 13	TUS	SGS																								16th	1674	
1995	NEMCO Motorsports	87	Chevy				MMR; 26	POR; 14	EVG; 27	I70; 23	LVL; 22	BRI; 29	MLW; 17	CNS; 15	HPT	IRP; 8	FLM; 20	RCH; 19	MAR; 9	NWS; 22	SON	MMR; 30	PHO; 19							16th	1674	
1996	Chek Racing	8	Chevy	HOM; 7	PHO; 14	POR; 12	EVG; 20	TUS; 17	CNS; 12	HPT; 21	BRI; 20	NZH; 20	MLW; 29	LVL; 10	I70; 16	IRP; 26	FLM; 14	GLN; 16	NSV; 21	RCH; 27	NHA; 20	MAR; 14	NWS; 19	SON; 16	MMR; 19	PHO; 17	LVS; 27			13th	2615	
1997	Chek Racing	8	Chevy	WDW; 36	TUS; 20	HOM; 21	PHO	POR	EVG	I70	NHA	TEX	BRI	NZH	MLW	LVL	CNS	HPT	IRP	FLM	NSV	GLN	RCH	MAR	SON	MMR	CAL	PHO	LVS	71st	258	
