= 1993 Champion Spark Plug 400 =

20th race of the 1993 NASCAR Winston Cup Series

Race details
- Race 20 of 30 in the 1993 NASCAR Winston Cup Series
- The 1993 Champion Spark Plug 400 program cover, featuring Harry Gant. Artwork by NASCAR artist Sam Bass.
- Date: August 15, 1993
- Official name: 24th Annual Champion Spark Plug 400
- Location: Cambridge Township, Michigan, Michigan International Speedway
- Course: Permanent racing facility
- Course length: 2 miles (3.2 km)
- Distance: 200 laps, 400 mi (643.737 km)
- Scheduled distance: 200 laps, 400 mi (643.737 km)
- Average speed: 144.564 miles per hour (232.653 km/h)
- Attendance: 110,000

Pole position
Driver	Ken Schrader	Hendrick Motorsports
- Time: 39.834

Most laps led
Driver	Ricky Rudd	Hendrick Motorsports
- Laps: 86

Winner
No. 6	Mark Martin	Roush Racing

Television in the United States
- Network: ESPN
- Announcers: Bob Jenkins, Ned Jarrett, Benny Parsons

Radio in the United States
- Radio: Motor Racing Network

The 1993 Champion Spark Plug 400 was the 20th stock car race of the 1993 NASCAR Winston Cup Series season and the eighth iteration of the event. The race was held on Sunday, August 15, 1993, before an audience of 110,000 in Cambridge Township, Michigan, at Michigan International Speedway, a two-mile (3.2 km) moderate-banked D-shaped speedway. The race took the scheduled 200 laps to complete. Taking advantage of a blown engine on dominant driver Ricky Rudd's car, Roush Racing driver Mark Martin would come to dominate the late stages of the race to take his ninth career NASCAR Winston Cup Series victory and his second victory of the season. To fill out the top three, Wood Brothers Racing driver Morgan Shepherd and Hendrick Motorsports driver Jeff Gordon would finish second and third, respectively.

== Background ==
The layout of Michigan International Speedway, the venue where the race was held.

The race was held at Michigan International Speedway, a two-mile (3.2 km) moderate-banked D-shaped speedway located in Cambridge Township, Michigan. The track is used primarily for NASCAR events. It is known as a "sister track" to Texas World Speedway as MIS's oval design was a direct basis of TWS, with moderate modifications to the banking in the corners, and was used as the basis of Auto Club Speedway. The track is owned by International Speedway Corporation. Michigan International Speedway is recognized as one of motorsports' premier facilities because of its wide racing surface and high banking (by open-wheel standards; the 18-degree banking is modest by stock car standards).

=== Entry list ===
- (R) denotes rookie driver.

#	Driver	Team	Make
1	Rick Mast	Precision Products Racing	Ford
2	Rusty Wallace	Penske Racing South	Pontiac
02	T. W. Taylor	Taylor Racing	Ford
3	Dale Earnhardt	Richard Childress Racing	Chevrolet
4	Ernie Irvan	Morgan–McClure Motorsports	Chevrolet
5	Ricky Rudd	Hendrick Motorsports	Chevrolet
6	Mark Martin	Roush Racing	Ford
7	Jimmy Hensley	AK Racing	Ford
8	Sterling Marlin	Stavola Brothers Racing	Ford
9	P. J. Jones (R)	Melling Racing	Ford
11	Bill Elliott	Junior Johnson & Associates	Ford
12	Jimmy Spencer	Bobby Allison Motorsports	Ford
14	Terry Labonte	Hagan Racing	Chevrolet
15	Geoff Bodine	Bud Moore Engineering	Ford
16	Wally Dallenbach Jr.	Roush Racing	Ford
17	Darrell Waltrip	Darrell Waltrip Motorsports	Chevrolet
18	Dale Jarrett	Joe Gibbs Racing	Chevrolet
21	Morgan Shepherd	Wood Brothers Racing	Ford
22	Bobby Labonte (R)	Bill Davis Racing	Ford
24	Jeff Gordon (R)	Hendrick Motorsports	Chevrolet
25	Ken Schrader	Hendrick Motorsports	Chevrolet
26	Brett Bodine	King Racing	Ford
27	Hut Stricklin	Junior Johnson & Associates	Ford
28	Lake Speed	Robert Yates Racing	Ford
29	John Krebs	Diamond Ridge Motorsports	Chevrolet
30	Michael Waltrip	Bahari Racing	Pontiac
32	Jimmy Horton	Active Motorsports	Chevrolet
33	Harry Gant	Leo Jackson Motorsports	Chevrolet
37	Loy Allen Jr.	TriStar Motorsports	Ford
39	Dick Trickle	Roulo Brothers Racing	Chevrolet
40	Kenny Wallace (R)	SABCO Racing	Pontiac
41	Phil Parsons	Larry Hedrick Motorsports	Chevrolet
42	Kyle Petty	SABCO Racing	Pontiac
44	Rick Wilson	Petty Enterprises	Pontiac
45	Rich Bickle	Terminal Trucking Motorsports	Ford
48	Andy Genzman	Genzman Racing	Pontiac
52	Jimmy Means	Jimmy Means Racing	Ford
53	Ritchie Petty	Petty Brothers Racing	Ford
55	Ted Musgrave	RaDiUs Motorsports	Ford
62	Clay Young	Jimmy Means Racing	Ford
68	Greg Sacks	TriStar Motorsports	Ford
71	Dave Marcis	Marcis Auto Racing	Chevrolet
75	Todd Bodine (R)	Butch Mock Motorsports	Ford
76	Ron Hornaday Jr.	Spears Motorsports	Chevrolet
81	Jeff Davis	Jeff Davis Racing	Ford
85	Ken Bouchard	Mansion Motorsports	Ford
87	Joe Nemechek	NEMCO Motorsports	Chevrolet
89	Jim Sauter	Mueller Brothers Racing	Ford
90	Bobby Hillin Jr.	Donlavey Racing	Ford
95	Jeremy Mayfield	Sadler Brothers Racing	Ford
98	Derrike Cope	Cale Yarborough Motorsports	Ford

== Qualifying ==
Qualifying was split into two rounds. The first round was held on Friday, August 13, at 3:30 PM EST. Each driver would have one lap to set a time. During the first round, the top 20 drivers in the round would be guaranteed a starting spot in the race. If a driver was not able to guarantee a spot in the first round, they had the option to scrub their time from the first round and try and run a faster lap time in a second round qualifying run, held on Saturday, August 14 at 10:30 AM EST. As with the first round, each driver would have one lap to set a time. For this specific race, positions 21-40 would be decided on time, and depending on who needed it, a select amount of positions were given to cars who had not otherwise qualified but were high enough in owner's points; up to two provisionals were given. If needed, a past champion who did not qualify on either time or provisionals could use a champion's provisional, adding one more spot to the field.

Ken Schrader, driving for Hendrick Motorsports, won the pole, setting a time of 39.834 and an average speed of 180.750 mph (290.889 km/h) in the first round.

Ten drivers would fail to qualify.

=== Full qualifying results ===
Pos.	#	Driver	Team	Make	Time	Speed
1	25	Ken Schrader	Hendrick Motorsports	Chevrolet	39.834	180.750
2	28	Lake Speed	Robert Yates Racing	Ford	39.943	180.257
3	5	Ricky Rudd	Hendrick Motorsports	Chevrolet	39.954	180.207
4	21	Morgan Shepherd	Wood Brothers Racing	Ford	40.112	179.497
5	55	Ted Musgrave	RaDiUs Motorsports	Ford	40.137	179.386
6	75	Todd Bodine (R)	Butch Mock Motorsports	Ford	40.199	179.109
7	3	Dale Earnhardt	Richard Childress Racing	Chevrolet	40.218	179.024
8	11	Bill Elliott	Junior Johnson & Associates	Ford	40.230	178.971
9	24	Jeff Gordon (R)	Hendrick Motorsports	Chevrolet	40.281	178.744
10	2	Rusty Wallace	Penske Racing South	Pontiac	40.348	178.448
11	22	Bobby Labonte (R)	Bill Davis Racing	Ford	40.357	178.408
12	6	Mark Martin	Roush Racing	Ford	40.399	178.222
13	68	Greg Sacks	TriStar Motorsports	Ford	40.418	178.138
14	40	Kenny Wallace (R)	SABCO Racing	Pontiac	40.420	178.130
15	7	Jimmy Hensley	AK Racing	Ford	40.445	178.020
16	1	Rick Mast	Precision Products Racing	Ford	40.449	178.002
17	98	Derrike Cope	Cale Yarborough Motorsports	Ford	40.456	177.971
18	90	Bobby Hillin Jr.	Donlavey Racing	Ford	40.488	177.830
19	26	Brett Bodine	King Racing	Ford	40.515	177.712
20	33	Harry Gant	Leo Jackson Motorsports	Chevrolet	40.525	177.668
Failed to lock in Round 1
21	87	Joe Nemechek	NEMCO Motorsports	Chevrolet	40.452	177.989
22	42	Kyle Petty	SABCO Racing	Pontiac	40.487	177.835
23	32	Jimmy Horton	Active Motorsports	Chevrolet	40.560	177.515
24	4	Ernie Irvan	Morgan–McClure Motorsports	Chevrolet	40.572	177.462
25	12	Jimmy Spencer	Bobby Allison Motorsports	Ford	40.601	177.336
26	15	Geoff Bodine	Bud Moore Engineering	Ford	40.603	177.327
27	18	Dale Jarrett	Joe Gibbs Racing	Chevrolet	40.614	177.279
28	30	Michael Waltrip	Bahari Racing	Pontiac	40.622	177.244
29	44	Rick Wilson	Petty Enterprises	Pontiac	40.668	177.043
30	17	Darrell Waltrip	Darrell Waltrip Motorsports	Chevrolet	40.692	176.939
31	52	Jimmy Means	Jimmy Means Racing	Ford	40.706	176.878
32	41	Phil Parsons	Larry Hedrick Motorsports	Chevrolet	40.715	176.839
33	89	Jim Sauter	Mueller Brothers Racing	Ford	40.724	176.800
34	8	Sterling Marlin	Stavola Brothers Racing	Ford	40.774	176.583
35	16	Wally Dallenbach Jr.	Roush Racing	Ford	40.777	176.570
36	45	Rich Bickle	Terminal Trucking Motorsports	Ford	40.811	176.423
37	27	Hut Stricklin	Junior Johnson & Associates	Ford	40.833	176.328
38	71	Dave Marcis	Marcis Auto Racing	Chevrolet	40.875	176.147
39	9	P. J. Jones (R)	Melling Racing	Ford	40.949	175.828
40	39	Dick Trickle	Roulo Brothers Racing	Chevrolet	40.992	175.644
Provisional
41	14	Terry Labonte	Hagan Racing	Chevrolet	41.398	173.921
Failed to qualify
42	37	Loy Allen Jr.	TriStar Motorsports	Ford	-*	-*
43	95	Jeremy Mayfield	Sadler Brothers Racing	Ford	-*	-*
44	53	Ritchie Petty	Petty Brothers Racing	Ford	-*	-*
45	85	Ken Bouchard	Mansion Motorsports	Ford	-*	-*
46	76	Ron Hornaday Jr.	Spears Motorsports	Chevrolet	-*	-*
47	62	Clay Young	Jimmy Means Racing	Ford	-*	-*
48	29	John Krebs	Diamond Ridge Motorsports	Chevrolet	-*	-*
49	81	Jeff Davis	Jeff Davis Racing	Ford	-*	-*
50	02	T. W. Taylor	Taylor Racing	Ford	-*	-*
51	48	Andy Genzman	Genzman Racing	Pontiac	-*	-*
Official first round qualifying results
Official starting lineup

== Race results ==
Fin	St	#	Driver	Team	Make	Laps	Led	Status	Pts	Winnings
1	12	6	Mark Martin	Roush Racing	Ford	200	81	running	180	$76,645
2	4	21	Morgan Shepherd	Wood Brothers Racing	Ford	200	0	running	170	$47,320
3	9	24	Jeff Gordon (R)	Hendrick Motorsports	Chevrolet	200	17	running	170	$34,745
4	27	18	Dale Jarrett	Joe Gibbs Racing	Chevrolet	200	0	running	160	$29,045
5	5	55	Ted Musgrave	RaDiUs Motorsports	Ford	200	3	running	160	$27,990
6	10	2	Rusty Wallace	Penske Racing South	Pontiac	200	4	running	155	$24,115
7	2	28	Lake Speed	Robert Yates Racing	Ford	200	2	running	151	$25,215
8	11	22	Bobby Labonte (R)	Bill Davis Racing	Ford	200	0	running	142	$17,565
9	7	3	Dale Earnhardt	Richard Childress Racing	Chevrolet	200	0	running	138	$19,215
10	8	11	Bill Elliott	Junior Johnson & Associates	Ford	200	0	running	134	$25,115
11	18	90	Bobby Hillin Jr.	Donlavey Racing	Ford	200	0	running	130	$12,015
12	13	68	Greg Sacks	TriStar Motorsports	Ford	200	0	running	127	$11,615
13	30	17	Darrell Waltrip	Darrell Waltrip Motorsports	Chevrolet	200	0	running	124	$21,015
14	19	26	Brett Bodine	King Racing	Ford	200	0	running	121	$16,615
15	15	7	Jimmy Hensley	AK Racing	Ford	200	0	running	118	$20,315
16	28	30	Michael Waltrip	Bahari Racing	Pontiac	199	0	running	115	$15,960
17	34	8	Sterling Marlin	Stavola Brothers Racing	Ford	199	0	running	112	$15,240
18	22	42	Kyle Petty	SABCO Racing	Pontiac	199	0	running	109	$17,540
19	32	41	Phil Parsons	Larry Hedrick Motorsports	Chevrolet	199	0	running	106	$11,540
20	25	12	Jimmy Spencer	Bobby Allison Motorsports	Ford	199	0	running	103	$14,690
21	17	98	Derrike Cope	Cale Yarborough Motorsports	Ford	199	0	running	100	$13,815
22	38	71	Dave Marcis	Marcis Auto Racing	Chevrolet	199	0	running	97	$8,815
23	14	40	Kenny Wallace (R)	SABCO Racing	Pontiac	199	0	running	94	$10,565
24	26	15	Geoff Bodine	Bud Moore Engineering	Ford	198	0	running	91	$16,615
25	31	52	Jimmy Means	Jimmy Means Racing	Ford	198	0	running	88	$8,465
26	39	9	P. J. Jones (R)	Melling Racing	Ford	196	0	running	85	$8,265
27	1	25	Ken Schrader	Hendrick Motorsports	Chevrolet	193	2	running	87	$16,965
28	29	44	Rick Wilson	Petty Enterprises	Pontiac	191	0	running	79	$9,815
29	41	14	Terry Labonte	Hagan Racing	Chevrolet	183	0	running	76	$12,665
30	20	33	Harry Gant	Leo Jackson Motorsports	Chevrolet	162	0	crash	73	$17,015
31	35	16	Wally Dallenbach Jr.	Roush Racing	Ford	157	0	running	70	$12,440
32	24	4	Ernie Irvan	Morgan–McClure Motorsports	Chevrolet	155	5	engine	72	$17,415
33	16	1	Rick Mast	Precision Products Racing	Ford	150	0	running	64	$12,315
34	37	27	Hut Stricklin	Junior Johnson & Associates	Ford	139	0	crash	61	$12,240
35	3	5	Ricky Rudd	Hendrick Motorsports	Chevrolet	125	86	engine	68	$14,590
36	33	89	Jim Sauter	Mueller Brothers Racing	Ford	108	0	crash	55	$7,640
37	21	87	Joe Nemechek	NEMCO Motorsports	Chevrolet	95	0	rear end	52	$8,115
38	23	32	Jimmy Horton	Active Motorsports	Chevrolet	94	0	engine	49	$7,590
39	40	39	Dick Trickle	Roulo Brothers Racing	Chevrolet	79	0	rear end	46	$7,565
40	6	75	Todd Bodine (R)	Butch Mock Motorsports	Ford	15	0	crash	43	$7,515
41	36	45	Rich Bickle	Terminal Trucking Motorsports	Ford	10	0	engine	40	$7,515
Official race results

== Standings after the race ==
Drivers' Championship standings

Pos	Driver	Points
1	Dale Earnhardt	3,049
2	Dale Jarrett	2,790 (-259)
3	Rusty Wallace	2,725 (-324)
4	Mark Martin	2,707 (–342)
5	Morgan Shepherd	2,672 (–377)
6	Kyle Petty	2,539 (–510)
7	Ken Schrader	2,490 (–559)
8	Ernie Irvan	2,447 (–602)
9	Geoff Bodine	2,425 (–624)
10	Jeff Gordon	2,423 (–626)
Official driver's standings

- Note: Only the first 10 positions are included for the driver standings.

Previous race: 1993 The Bud at The Glen	NASCAR Winston Cup Series; 1993 season	Next race: 1993 Bud 500
