= Chris Trickle =

American racing driver (1972–1998)

- Born: May 30, 1972 Las Vegas, Nevada, U.S.
- Died: March 25, 1998 (aged 25) Las Vegas, Nevada, U.S.

NASCAR Featherlite Southwest Tour
- Years active: 1994–1997
- Car number: 70
- Starts: 34
- Wins: 1
- Poles: 2
- Best finish: 4th in 1996

Previous series
- 1996 1994, 1996 1995: NASCAR Craftsman Truck Series; NASCAR Winston West Series; NASCAR Northwest Series

Chris Trickle (May 30, 1972 – March 25, 1998) was an American stock car racing driver. A competitor in the NASCAR Featherlite Southwest Tour, he was murdered in a drive-by shooting that remains unsolved.

== Family ==
Trickle was the son of Chuck and Barbara Trickle, and nephew of NASCAR driver Dick Trickle. Trickle was also the father of twins Joelyn Hope and Cole Trickle Miele. Joelyn and Cole were born on April 23, 2001. Their birth was the product of in vitro fertilization.

== Racing career ==
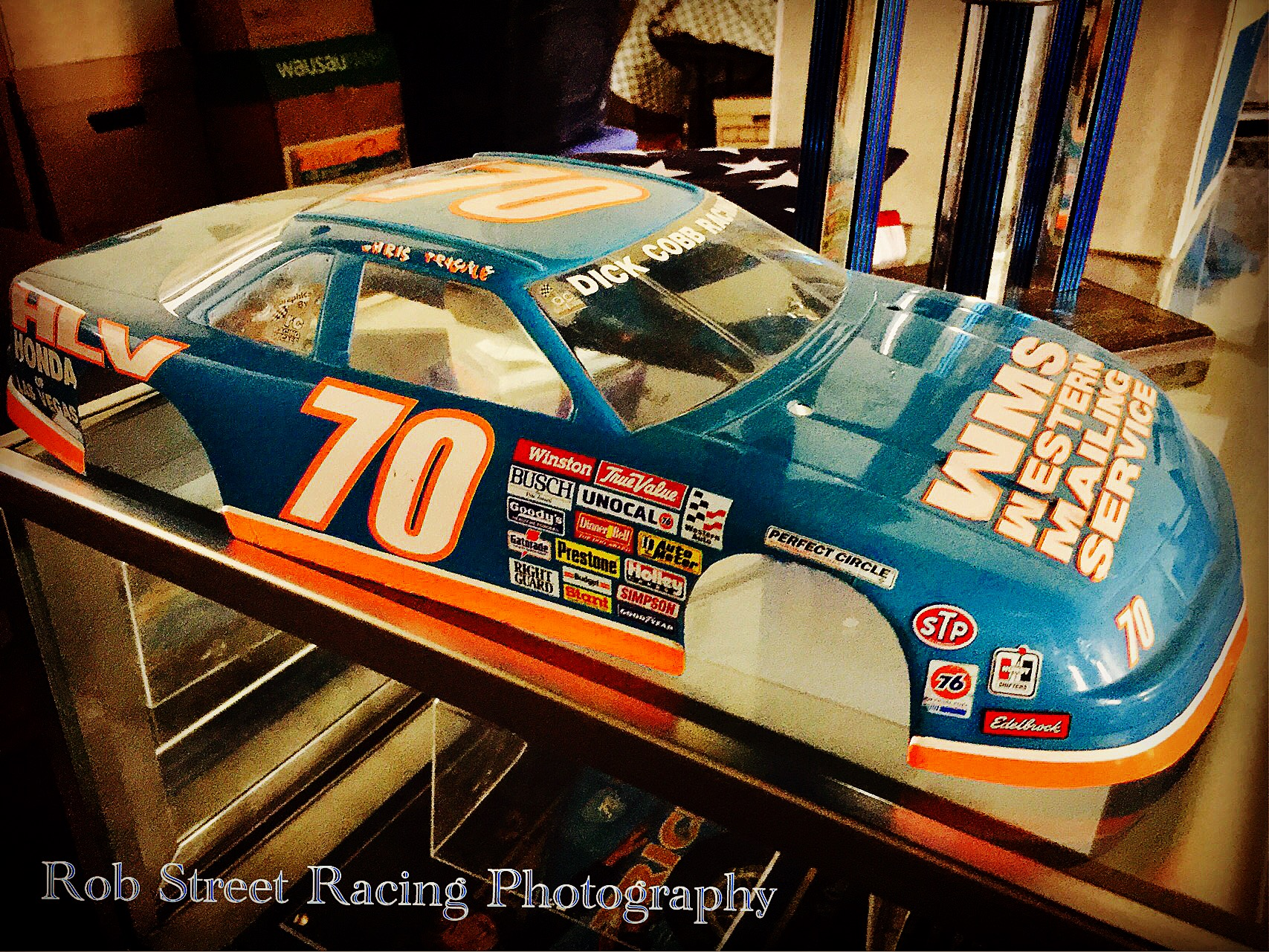
"Big Chris Trickle" Model

Trickle began racing in motorcycles when he was eight years old. He had two track championships by the time he was fifteen. He then drove in a national touring series.

Trickle turned to stock cars in 1990. He was the 1992 Rookie of the Year in late models at the 3/8 mile track at Las Vegas Speedway Park. He finished third in the season points with three wins in eighteen events.

Trickle had ten wins, fourteen poles, and twelve top-ten finishes in 23 events and finished second in the 1993 Southern California Sportsman Series (late models).

In 1994, Trickle had eight wins, 20 poles, and eighteen top-ten finishes in 29 races in his late model.

In 1995, Trickle competed at two levels. He had sixteen wins and 24 poles in 32 races in his late model. He also competed in thirteen races in the NASCAR AutoZone Elite Division, Southwest Series (Southwest Series), and he had one pole and one top-ten finish.

In 1996, Trickle competed exclusively in the Southwest Series, winning one race and finishing in the top-ten nine times; he also attempted to qualify for Craftsman Truck Series events at Phoenix International Raceway and Las Vegas Motor Speedway.

Trickle gained national attention while appearing on the NASCAR Winter Heat series on TNN and ESPN2. He raced in late models, the NASCAR AutoZone Elite Division, Southwest Series, and NASCAR Grand National Division, West Series during the series. He competed in the No. 70 car.

Trickle was scheduled to join the NASCAR Craftsman Truck Series in 1997.

== Death ==
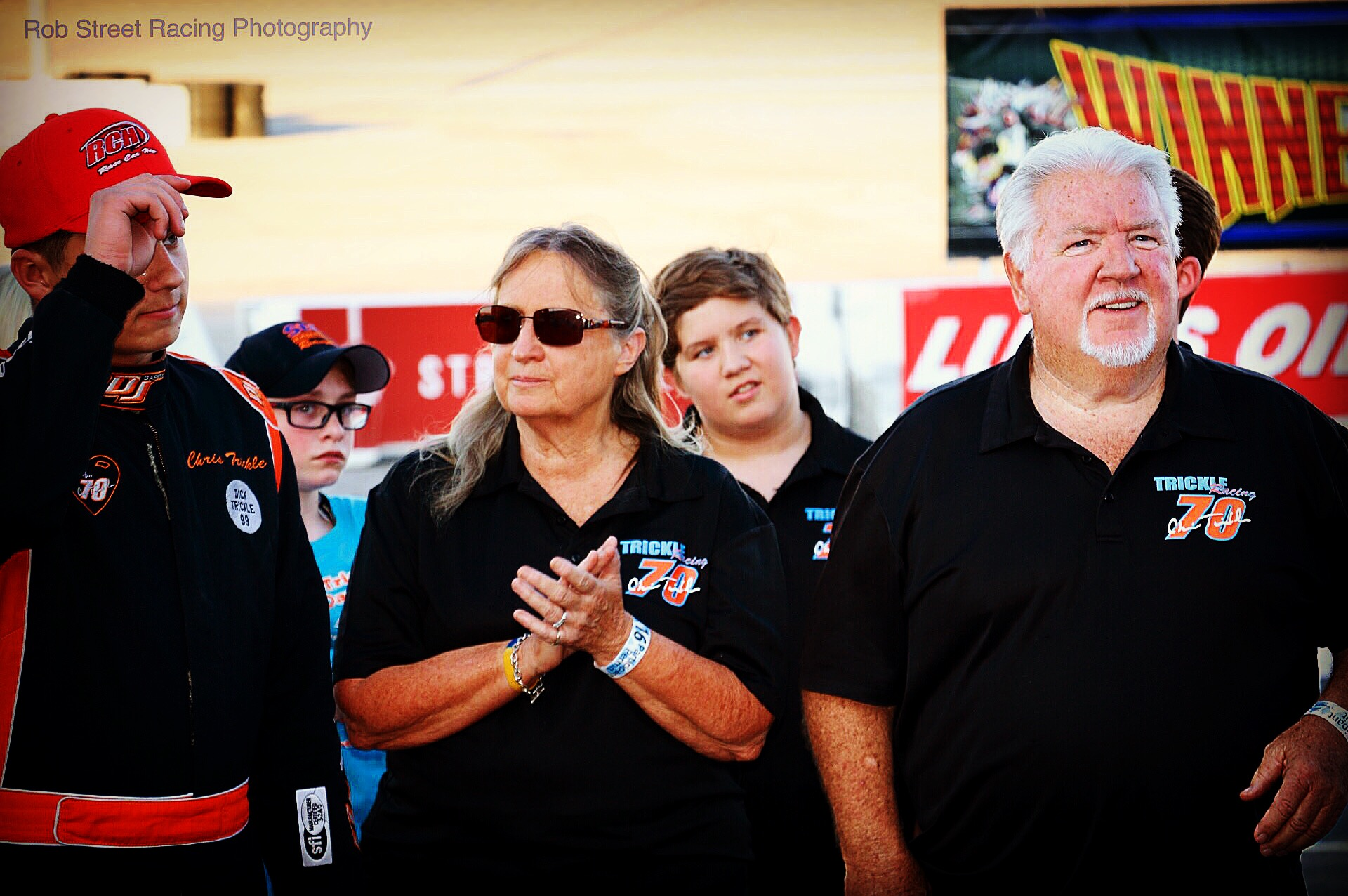
"Little" Chris Trickle tips his cap to "Big" Chris Trickle's memory at the "Chris Trickle Classic" in June 2016

On February 9, 1997, Trickle left his home in Las Vegas around 9 p.m. to play tennis with a friend at a lighted court. As he drove over the freeway, a car drove alongside and fired shots into his car hitting him in the head.

Trickle died from complications of his wounds on March 25, 1998, 409 days after the shooting. At the time of the shooting, Nevada law limited murder prosecution to one year and one day. Trickle's death from his wounds thus occurred after the prosecution time limit. In 1999, Nevada passed a law (called the "Chris Trickle bill") which removed the time limit on prosecution for murder charges. Trickle's murder remains unsolved, and was featured twice on America's Most Wanted.

His father Chuck returned to racing afterwards and became the 2003 Super Late Model Champion at The Bullring at Las Vegas Motor Speedway, but no longer actively races. His brother's two sons, Tommy and another Chris (named in his memory) are also racers who compete the Bullring in Las Vegas. Trickle was succeeded in the Star Nursery team's Southwest Tour car by Kurt Busch, who won the 1999 Southwest Tour Championship with the team.

== See also ==
- List of unsolved murders (1980–1999)

== Motorsports career results ==
=== NASCAR ===
(key) (Bold – Pole position awarded by qualifying time. Italics – Pole position earned by points standings or practice time. * – Most laps led.)

==== Craftsman Truck Series ====
NASCAR Craftsman Truck Series results
Year	Team	No.	Make	1	2	3	4	5	6	7	8	9	10	11	12	13	14	15	16	17	18	19	20	21	22	23	24	NCTSC	Pts	Ref
1996	Star Nursery Racing Team	0	Chevy	HOM	PHO	POR	EVG	TUS	CNS	HPT	BRI	NZH	MLW	LVL	I70	IRP	FLM	GLN	NSV	RCH	NHA	MAR	NWS	SON	MMR	PHO; DNQ	LVS; DNQ	133rd	44	
