= 1996 NASCAR Winston West Series =

43rd season of the NASCAR Winston West Series

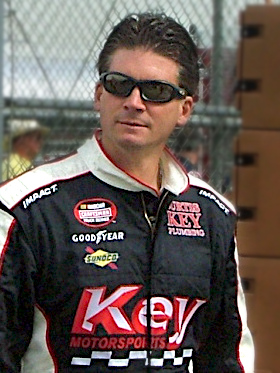
Lance Hooper, the 1996 West Series champion.

The 1996 NASCAR Winston West Series was the 43rd season of the series. The title was won by Lance Hooper, his first in the series.

== Schedule and results ==
The 1996 season included 15 individual races, although Mesa Marin Raceway hosted three races and Sears Point Raceway, Tucson Raceway Park, and Madera Speedway hosted two races each. The first race at Sears Point and the race at Phoenix International Raceway were in combination with the NASCAR Winston Cup Series. After returning the finale to Phoenix in 1995, it would again move in 1996, this time at Las Vegas Motor Speedway.

Date	Name	Racetrack	Location	Winner
January 21	NASCAR Winston West Series 150	Tucson Raceway Park	Tucson, Arizona	Ron Hornaday Jr.
March 17	St. Patrick's Day 200	Altamont Motorsports Park	Tracy, California	Lance Hooper
April 27	Spears Manufacturing 200	Mesa Marin Raceway	Bakersfield, California	Larry Gunselman
May 5	Save Mart Supermarkets 300	Sears Point Raceway	Sonoma, California	Rusty Wallace
May 18	Imperial Palace/Race Stuff 200	Madera Speedway	Madera, California	Butch Gilliland
June 1	Reser's Fine Foods 200 by Action Auto Glass	Portland Speedway	Portland, Oregon	Lance Hooper
June 15	Valvoline/Jiffy Lube 200	Tucson Raceway Park	Tucson, Arizona	Mark Krogh
June 29	Winston 200 Presented by Alley Chevrolet	Evergreen Speedway	Monroe, Washington	Butch Gilliland
July 13	Snap-On 200	Colorado National Speedway	Erie, Colorado	Ron Hornaday Jr.
August 10	Race Stuff 250	Madera Speedway	Madera, California	Lance Hooper
August 24	Carquest Auto Parts 250	Mesa Marin Raceway	Bakersfield, California	Joe Bean
October 5	Sonoma 100	Sears Point Raceway	Sonoma, California	Butch Gilliland
October 12	Spears Manufacturing 300	Mesa Marin Raceway	Bakersfield, California	Lance Hooper
October 27	Dura Lube 500	Phoenix International Raceway	Avondale, Arizona	Bobby Hamilton
November 1	Las Vegas 300K	Las Vegas Motor Speedway	Las Vegas, Nevada	Ken Schrader

== Full Drivers' Championship ==
(key) Bold – Pole position awarded by time. Italics – Pole position set by owner's points. * – Most laps led. † – Ineligible for West Series points

Pos	Driver	TUS	AMP	MMR	SON	MAD	POR	TUS	EVG	CNS	MAD	MMR	SON	MMR	PHO	LVS	Pts
1	Lance Hooper	2	**1***	7	DNQ	10	1*	4	4	5	1*	**16***	3	1*	33	10	2185
2	Jeff Krogh	6	21	4	35	4	**4**	3	5	2	2	5	2	2	41		2155
3	Larry Gunselman	16	7	1	36	3	2	13	3	3	6	4	14	5	DNQ	4	2070
4	Mark Krogh	18	12	10	DNQ	**2***	7	1	**6**	6	12	10	16	**10**	DNQ		1907
5	Scott Gaylord	25	2	18	38	13	5	16	12	11	**3**	3	**4**	20	DNQ	9	1883
6	Rich Woodland Jr.	10	15	8	37	8	8	11	9	16	9	6	8	6	DNQ	19	1841
7	Joe Bean	22	11	9	DNQ	12	10	5	19	8	10	1	15	12	DNQ	25	1789
8	Butch Gilliland			**6**		1	18	**2***	1	**14***	18	2	1	14		6	1675
9	Bill McAnally	15	16	17	DNQ	11	17	10	17	12	15	17	12	9	DNQ	22	1623
10	Pete Graham	19	20	11		14	9	12	14	7	13		22	22		23	1404
11	Dan Obrist	23	24	16			6	15	7		20	7	18	3		16	1352
12	Jack Sellers	17	23			9	14	9	18	13	7	11	17	18			1333
13	John Kinder	9	18	2		5	11	14	16		5	8				28	1314
14	Mike Welch	20	19			16		20	23	19	14	12	21	11			1105
15	St. James Davis		26			15		18	24	17	19	20	23	17		24	1021
16	Wayne Jacks	28	3	15	DNQ	7						13	20			14	1002
17	Lew Miller							19	13	10	8	18		7		20	864
18	Gary Collins	3	9	13				7		9	17						828
19	Kevin Culver						3		11		4		6	8		29	823
20	Pappy Pryor		17	14			15				11		10	15			733
21	Ron Burns	13	6					8								5	571
22	Ron Hornaday Jr.	**1**								1			11*				500
23	Dan Press	8	5	3													462
24	Brandon Ash						16		22		21			21			412
25	Victor Mibelli		10									14	9				393
26	Leo Hindery			12			12									17	366
27	Lee Olibas											21	7	16			361
28	Kenny Smith	24	13									15					333
29	Bobby Gill	7*		5*													321
30	L. J. Pryor	27	22						10								313
31	Billy Kann	31						17								18	291
32	Steve Portenga	4	14														281
33	Tobey Butler								8*							12	279
34	Rick Carelli	5								15							273
35	Rick Scribner		8										13				266
36	Nick Jennings					6				16							265
37	Craig Raudman						13					9					262
38	Greg Biffle	30	4														238
39	Sonny Scott								15			19					224
40	Mike Naake									18			19				215
41	Sean Monroe													13		26	209
42	John Sahm						19		21								206
43	Ernie Cope	21	25														188
44	Ken Schrader				8†										35†	**1***	185
45	Rich DeLong Jr.													19		30	179
46	Tim Steele															2	175
47	Gary Smith								2								175
48	Michael Waltrip															3	170
49	Nathan Buttke													4			160
50	Roger Avants									4							160
51	Rudy Revak												5				155
52	Carl Trimmer							6									150
53	Bobby Gerhart															7	146
54	Darrel Krentz															8	142
55	Jon Paques	11															130
56	Chris Trickle															11	130
57	Terry Fisher	12															127
58	Kevin Harvick															13	124
59	Eric Norris	14															121
60	Gary Clark															15	118
61	Ron Jacks			19													106
62	George Nordling			20													103
63	Ken Bailey						20										103
64	Barry Graham								20								103
65	Hershel McGriff															21	100
66	Bob Howard	26															85
67	Dennis Dyer															27	82
68	Tim McCauley	29															76
	Michael Cochran															31	70

== See also ==
- 1996 NASCAR Winston Cup Series
- 1996 NASCAR Busch Series
- 1996 NASCAR Craftsman Truck Series
