= 1993 Hooters 500 =

30th race of the 1993 NASCAR Winston Cup Series

Race details
- Race 30 of 30 in the 1993 NASCAR Winston Cup Series
- The 1993 Hooters 500 program cover, featuring a tribute to Alan Kulwicki, who had died in an airplane accident earlier in the year.
- Date: November 14, 1993
- Official name: 34th Annual Hooters 500
- Location: Hampton, Georgia, Atlanta Motor Speedway
- Course: Permanent racing facility
- Course length: 1.522 miles (2.449 km)
- Distance: 328 laps, 499.216 mi (803.41 km)
- Scheduled distance: 328 laps, 499.216 mi (803.41 km)
- Average speed: 125.221 miles per hour (201.524 km/h)

Pole position
Driver	Harry Gant	Leo Jackson Motorsports
- Time: 30.973

Most laps led
Driver	Rusty Wallace	Penske Racing South
- Laps: 189

Winner
No. 2	Rusty Wallace	Penske Racing South

Television in the United States
- Network: ESPN
- Announcers: Bob Jenkins, Ned Jarrett, Benny Parsons

Radio in the United States
- Radio: Motor Racing Network

The 1993 Hooters 500 was the 30th and final stock car race of the 1993 NASCAR Winston Cup Series season and the 34th iteration of the event. The race was held on Sunday, November 14, 1993, in Hampton, Georgia, at Atlanta Motor Speedway, a 1.522 miles (2.449 km) permanent asphalt quad-oval intermediate speedway. The race took the scheduled 328 laps to complete. In the final laps of the race, Penske Racing South driver Rusty Wallace would make a late-race charge to take the lead with four laps to go, securing his 31st career NASCAR Winston Cup Series victory and his 10th and final victory of the season. To fill out the top three, Hendrick Motorsports driver Ricky Rudd and owner-driver Darrell Waltrip would finish second and third, respectively.

Meanwhile, 10th-place finisher Dale Earnhardt would manage to win his sixth career NASCAR Winston Cup Series championship, only needing a 34th-place finish or better to do so. With the championship, he was one championship away from tying Richard Petty's record of seven championships.

== Background ==
The layout of Atlanta Motor Speedway, the circuit where the race was held.

Atlanta Motor Speedway (formerly Atlanta International Raceway) is a 1.522-mile race track in Hampton, Georgia, United States, 20 miles (32 km) south of Atlanta. It has annually hosted NASCAR Winston Cup Series stock car races since its inauguration in 1960.

The venue was bought by Speedway Motorsports in 1990. In 1994, 46 condominiums were built over the northeastern side of the track. In 1997, to standardize the track with Speedway Motorsports' other two intermediate ovals, the entire track was almost completely rebuilt. The frontstretch and backstretch were swapped, and the configuration of the track was changed from oval to quad-oval, with a new official length of 1.54-mile (2.48 km) where before it was 1.522-mile (2.449 km). The project made the track one of the fastest on the NASCAR circuit.

=== Entry list ===
- (R) - denotes rookie driver.

#	Driver	Team	Make
1	Rick Mast	Precision Products Racing	Ford
2	Rusty Wallace	Penske Racing South	Pontiac
02	T. W. Taylor	Taylor Racing	Ford
3	Dale Earnhardt	Richard Childress Racing	Chevrolet
4	Jimmy Hensley	Morgan–McClure Motorsports	Chevrolet
5	Ricky Rudd	Hendrick Motorsports	Chevrolet
6	Mark Martin	Roush Racing	Ford
7	Geoff Bodine	Geoff Bodine Racing	Ford
8	Sterling Marlin	Stavola Brothers Racing	Ford
9	P. J. Jones (R)	Melling Racing	Ford
11	Bill Elliott	Junior Johnson & Associates	Ford
12	Jimmy Spencer	Bobby Allison Motorsports	Ford
14	Terry Labonte	Hagan Racing	Chevrolet
15	Lake Speed	Bud Moore Engineering	Ford
16	Wally Dallenbach Jr.	Roush Racing	Ford
17	Darrell Waltrip	Darrell Waltrip Motorsports	Chevrolet
18	Dale Jarrett	Joe Gibbs Racing	Chevrolet
20	Bobby Hamilton	Moroso Racing	Ford
21	Morgan Shepherd	Wood Brothers Racing	Ford
22	Bobby Labonte (R)	Bill Davis Racing	Ford
24	Jeff Gordon (R)	Hendrick Motorsports	Chevrolet
25	Ken Schrader	Hendrick Motorsports	Chevrolet
26	Brett Bodine	King Racing	Ford
27	Hut Stricklin	Junior Johnson & Associates	Ford
28	Ernie Irvan	Robert Yates Racing	Ford
30	Michael Waltrip	Bahari Racing	Pontiac
31	Neil Bonnett	Richard Childress Racing	Chevrolet
32	Jimmy Horton	Active Motorsports	Chevrolet
33	Harry Gant	Leo Jackson Motorsports	Chevrolet
37	Loy Allen Jr.	TriStar Motorsports	Ford
40	Kenny Wallace (R)	SABCO Racing	Pontiac
41	Dick Trickle	Larry Hedrick Motorsports	Chevrolet
42	Kyle Petty	SABCO Racing	Pontiac
44	Rick Wilson	Petty Enterprises	Pontiac
45	Rich Bickle	Terminal Trucking Motorsports	Ford
47	Billy Standridge	Johnson Standridge Racing	Ford
48	Andy Genzman	Genzman Racing	Pontiac
52	Jimmy Means	Jimmy Means Racing	Ford
55	Ted Musgrave	RaDiUs Motorsports	Ford
57	Bob Schacht	Bob Schacht Motorsports	Oldsmobile
61	Rick Carelli	Chesrown Racing	Chevrolet
62	Clay Young	Jimmy Means Racing	Ford
63	Norm Benning	O'Neil Racing	Oldsmobile
66	Mike Wallace	Owen Racing	Pontiac
68	Greg Sacks	TriStar Motorsports	Ford
71	Dave Marcis	Marcis Auto Racing	Chevrolet
72	John Andretti	Tex Racing	Chevrolet
75	Todd Bodine* (R)	Butch Mock Motorsports	Ford
84	Rick Crawford	Circle Bar Racing	Ford
90	Bobby Hillin Jr.	Donlavey Racing	Ford
95	Jeremy Mayfield	Sadler Brothers Racing	Ford
98	Derrike Cope	Cale Yarborough Motorsports	Ford

*Driver switched to Phil Parsons for the race after Bodine was involved in a crash that would injure him in the preliminary Saturday race.

== Qualifying ==
Qualifying was split into two rounds. The first round was held on Thursday, November 12, at 1:00 PM EST. Each driver would have one lap to set a time. During the first round, the top 20 drivers in the round would be guaranteed a starting spot in the race. If a driver was not able to guarantee a spot in the first round, they had the option to scrub their time from the first round and try and run a faster lap time in a second round qualifying run, held on Saturday, November 13, at 11:00 AM EST. As with the first round, each driver would have one lap to set a time. For this specific race, positions 21-40 would be decided on time, and depending on who needed it, a select amount of positions were given to cars who had not otherwise qualified but were high enough in owner's points; up to two were given. If needed, a past champion who did not qualify on either time or provisionals could use a champion's provisional, adding one more spot to the field.

Harry Gant, driving for Leo Jackson Motorsports, won the pole, setting a time of 30.973 and an average speed of 176.902 mph (284.696 km/h) in the first round.

Ten drivers would fail to qualify.

=== Full qualifying results ===
Pos.	#	Driver	Team	Make	Time	Speed
1	33	Harry Gant	Leo Jackson Motorsports	Chevrolet	30.973	176.902
2	26	Brett Bodine	King Racing	Ford	31.248	175.346
3	1	Rick Mast	Precision Products Racing	Ford	31.250	175.334
4	55	Ted Musgrave	RaDiUs Motorsports	Ford	31.336	174.853
5	12	Jimmy Spencer	Bobby Allison Motorsports	Ford	31.374	174.641
6	20	Bobby Hamilton	Moroso Racing	Ford	31.376	174.630
7	28	Ernie Irvan	Robert Yates Racing	Ford	31.380	174.608
8	11	Bill Elliott	Junior Johnson & Associates	Ford	31.411	174.436
9	45	Rich Bickle	Terminal Trucking Motorsports	Ford	31.423	174.369
10	15	Lake Speed	Bud Moore Engineering	Ford	31.458	174.175
11	7	Geoff Bodine	Geoff Bodine Racing	Ford	31.483	174.037
12	90	Bobby Hillin Jr.	Donlavey Racing	Ford	31.534	173.755
13	5	Ricky Rudd	Hendrick Motorsports	Chevrolet	31.543	173.706
14	32	Jimmy Horton	Active Motorsports	Chevrolet	31.569	173.563
15	24	Jeff Gordon (R)	Hendrick Motorsports	Chevrolet	31.580	173.502
16	21	Morgan Shepherd	Wood Brothers Racing	Ford	31.597	173.409
17	4	Jimmy Hensley	Morgan–McClure Motorsports	Chevrolet	31.633	173.212
18	41	Dick Trickle	Larry Hedrick Motorsports	Chevrolet	31.636	173.195
19	3	Dale Earnhardt	Richard Childress Racing	Chevrolet	31.667	173.026
20	2	Rusty Wallace	Penske Racing South	Pontiac	31.700	172.845
Failed to lock in Round 1
21	25	Ken Schrader	Hendrick Motorsports	Chevrolet	31.503	173.926
22	75	Todd Bodine (R)	Butch Mock Motorsports	Ford	31.521	173.827
23	66	Mike Wallace	Owen Racing	Pontiac	31.570	173.557
24	37	Loy Allen Jr.	TriStar Motorsports	Ford	31.701	172.840
25	61	Rick Carelli	Chesrown Racing	Chevrolet	31.724	172.715
26	68	Greg Sacks	TriStar Motorsports	Ford	31.727	172.698
27	98	Derrike Cope	Cale Yarborough Motorsports	Ford	31.735	172.655
28	17	Darrell Waltrip	Darrell Waltrip Motorsports	Chevrolet	31.751	172.568
29	18	Dale Jarrett	Joe Gibbs Racing	Chevrolet	31.767	172.481
30	14	Terry Labonte	Hagan Racing	Chevrolet	31.773	172.448
31	30	Michael Waltrip	Bahari Racing	Pontiac	31.773	172.448
32	22	Bobby Labonte (R)	Bill Davis Racing	Ford	31.777	172.427
33	6	Mark Martin	Roush Racing	Ford	31.803	172.286
34	8	Sterling Marlin	Stavola Brothers Racing	Ford	31.804	172.280
35	31	Neil Bonnett	Richard Childress Racing	Chevrolet	31.812	172.237
36	44	Rick Wilson	Petty Enterprises	Pontiac	31.832	172.129
37	71	Dave Marcis	Marcis Auto Racing	Chevrolet	31.873	171.907
38	16	Wally Dallenbach Jr.	Roush Racing	Ford	31.879	171.875
39	02	T. W. Taylor	Taylor Racing	Ford	31.897	171.778
40	40	Kenny Wallace (R)	SABCO Racing	Pontiac	31.906	171.729
Provisionals
41	42	Kyle Petty	SABCO Racing	Pontiac	-*	-*
42	27	Hut Stricklin	Junior Johnson & Associates	Ford	-*	-*
Failed to qualify
43	47	Billy Standridge	Johnson Standridge Racing	Ford	-*	-*
44	95	Jeremy Mayfield	Sadler Brothers Racing	Ford	-*	-*
45	52	Jimmy Means	Jimmy Means Racing	Ford	-*	-*
46	62	Clay Young	Jimmy Means Racing	Ford	-*	-*
47	57	Bob Schacht	Bob Schacht Motorsports	Oldsmobile	-*	-*
48	72	John Andretti	Tex Racing	Chevrolet	-*	-*
49	63	Norm Benning	O'Neil Racing	Oldsmobile	-*	-*
50	9	P. J. Jones (R)	Melling Racing	Ford	-*	-*
51	84	Rick Crawford	Circle Bar Racing	Ford	-*	-*
52	48	Andy Genzman	Genzman Racing	Pontiac	-*	-*
Official first round qualifying results
Official starting lineup

== Race results ==
Fin	St	#	Driver	Team	Make	Laps	Led	Status	Pts	Winnings
1	20	2	Rusty Wallace	Penske Racing South	Pontiac	328	189	running	185	$93,100
2	13	5	Ricky Rudd	Hendrick Motorsports	Chevrolet	328	5	running	175	$57,225
3	28	17	Darrell Waltrip	Darrell Waltrip Motorsports	Chevrolet	328	18	running	170	$40,175
4	8	11	Bill Elliott	Junior Johnson & Associates	Ford	328	7	running	165	$34,250
5	18	41	Dick Trickle	Larry Hedrick Motorsports	Chevrolet	328	0	running	155	$24,300
6	31	30	Michael Waltrip	Bahari Racing	Pontiac	328	2	running	155	$21,875
7	29	18	Dale Jarrett	Joe Gibbs Racing	Chevrolet	328	12	running	151	$23,380
8	4	55	Ted Musgrave	RaDiUs Motorsports	Ford	328	0	running	142	$20,950
9	22	75	Phil Parsons	Butch Mock Motorsports	Ford	328	3	running	143	$11,725
10	19	3	Dale Earnhardt	Richard Childress Racing	Chevrolet	327	2	running	139	$19,300
11	41	42	Kyle Petty	SABCO Racing	Pontiac	327	0	running	130	$18,575
12	7	28	Ernie Irvan	Robert Yates Racing	Ford	327	0	running	127	$20,250
13	30	14	Terry Labonte	Hagan Racing	Chevrolet	327	0	running	124	$15,625
14	32	22	Bobby Labonte (R)	Bill Davis Racing	Ford	327	4	running	126	$14,500
15	23	66	Mike Wallace	Owen Racing	Pontiac	326	0	running	118	$10,600
16	5	12	Jimmy Spencer	Bobby Allison Motorsports	Ford	326	0	running	115	$14,900
17	34	8	Sterling Marlin	Stavola Brothers Racing	Ford	326	0	running	112	$14,255
18	37	71	Dave Marcis	Marcis Auto Racing	Chevrolet	326	0	running	109	$8,315
19	27	98	Derrike Cope	Cale Yarborough Motorsports	Ford	325	0	running	106	$12,925
20	33	6	Mark Martin	Roush Racing	Ford	325	0	running	103	$16,310
21	6	20	Bobby Hamilton	Moroso Racing	Ford	325	0	running	100	$7,995
22	42	27	Hut Stricklin	Junior Johnson & Associates	Ford	323	0	running	97	$12,455
23	36	44	Rick Wilson	Petty Enterprises	Pontiac	323	0	running	94	$8,965
24	26	68	Greg Sacks	TriStar Motorsports	Ford	322	0	running	91	$6,700
25	17	4	Jimmy Hensley	Morgan–McClure Motorsports	Chevrolet	308	0	running	88	$16,135
26	10	15	Lake Speed	Bud Moore Engineering	Ford	307	0	running	85	$14,420
27	21	25	Ken Schrader	Hendrick Motorsports	Chevrolet	293	0	running	82	$9,955
28	1	33	Harry Gant	Leo Jackson Motorsports	Chevrolet	225	78	crash	84	$30,920
29	24	37	Loy Allen Jr.	TriStar Motorsports	Ford	223	0	crash	76	$6,175
30	40	40	Kenny Wallace (R)	SABCO Racing	Pontiac	214	0	crash	73	$8,200
31	15	24	Jeff Gordon (R)	Hendrick Motorsports	Chevrolet	193	6	crash	75	$8,710
32	16	21	Morgan Shepherd	Wood Brothers Racing	Ford	184	2	engine	72	$10,720
33	38	16	Wally Dallenbach Jr.	Roush Racing	Ford	156	0	crash	64	$10,430
34	39	02	T. W. Taylor	Taylor Racing	Ford	134	0	crash	61	$5,840
35	25	61	Rick Carelli	Chesrown Racing	Chevrolet	117	0	vibration	58	$5,775
36	9	45	Rich Bickle	Terminal Trucking Motorsports	Ford	113	0	transmission	55	$5,710
37	3	1	Rick Mast	Precision Products Racing	Ford	105	0	engine	52	$10,170
38	14	32	Jimmy Horton	Active Motorsports	Chevrolet	46	0	crash	49	$5,640
39	11	7	Geoff Bodine	Geoff Bodine Racing	Ford	28	0	crash	46	$15,015
40	2	26	Brett Bodine	King Racing	Ford	19	0	crash	43	$8,600
41	12	90	Bobby Hillin Jr.	Donlavey Racing	Ford	19	0	crash	40	$5,600
42	35	31	Neil Bonnett	Richard Childress Racing	Chevrolet	3	0	engine	37	$5,600
Official race results

== Standings after the race ==
Drivers' Championship standings

	Pos	Driver	Points
	1	Dale Earnhardt	4,526
	2	Rusty Wallace	4,446 (-80)
	3	Mark Martin	4,150 (-376)
	4	Dale Jarrett	4,000 (–526)
1	5	Kyle Petty	3,860 (–666)
1	6	Ernie Irvan	3,834 (–692)
2	7	Morgan Shepherd	3,807 (–719)
1	8	Bill Elliott	3,774 (–752)
1	9	Ken Schrader	3,715 (–811)
	10	Ricky Rudd	3,644 (–882)
Official driver's standings

- Note: Only the first 10 positions are included for the driver standings.

Previous race: 1993 Slick 50 500	NASCAR Winston Cup Series; 1993 season	Next race: 1994 Daytona 500
