= Andy Genzman =

American racing driver (born 1960)

- Born: Andy Dean Genzman; December 5, 1960 (age 65); Fremont, Ohio, U.S.

NASCAR FedEx Freight Truck Series career
- 13 races run over 4 years
- Best finish: 32nd (1996)
- First race: 1996 Coca-Cola 200 (Bristol)
- Last race: 2000 thatlook.com 200 (Loudon)
Wins	Top tens	Poles
0	0	0

Andy Dean Genzman (born December 5, 1960) is an American former stock car racing driver. He competed in thirteen NASCAR Craftsman Truck Series races in his career.

== NASCAR career ==
Genzman debuted in 1996, running three races. In all of the three starts he made that year, Genzman finished in the top-twenty. After starting 28th, he finished seventeenth in his debut at Bristol. He was then eighteenth at Infineon and twentieth at Mesa Marin.

Genzman would make two more races in 1997. He started nineteenth and finished 32nd at Evergreen, his worst career finish. He was able to improve somewhat when he returned to racing at ORP, finishing 21st.

Genzman returned to racing eight times in 2000. Although he only finished in the top-twenty three times in the year, his worst finish was just 31st (which was the only race he did not finish). His best finish ended up being an eighteenth at Evergreen, closely followed by a nineteenth at Milwaukee. Genzman's 31st in points would prove to be his best career showing and he has not raced since then.

== Motorsports career results ==
=== NASCAR ===
(key) (Bold – Pole position awarded by qualifying time. Italics – Pole position earned by points standings or practice time. * – Most laps led.)

==== Winston Cup Series ====
NASCAR Winston Cup Series results
Year	Team	No.	Make	1	2	3	4	5	6	7	8	9	10	11	12	13	14	15	16	17	18	19	20	21	22	23	24	25	26	27	28	29	30	NWCC	Pts	Ref
1993	Genzman Racing	48	Pontiac	DAY	CAR	RCH	ATL	DAR	BRI	NWS	MAR	TAL	SON	CLT	DOV	POC	MCH	DAY	NHA	POC	TAL	GLN	MCH; DNQ	BRI	DAR	RCH	DOV	MAR	NWS	CLT	CAR	PHO	ATL; DNQ	NA	-	

==== Craftsman Truck Series ====
NASCAR Camping World Truck Series results
Year	Team	No.	Make	1	2	3	4	5	6	7	8	9	10	11	12	13	14	15	16	17	18	19	20	21	22	23	24	25	26	NCTC	Pts	Ref
1995	Genzman Racing	48		PHO	TUS	SGS	MMR	POR	EVG	I70	LVL	BRI	MLW	CNS	HPT	IRP	FLM	RCH	MAR; DNQ	NWS; DNQ	SON	MMR	PHO							86th	95	
1996	Genzman Racing	25	Ford	HOM; DNQ	PHO	POR	EVG	TUS	CNS	HPT	BRI; 17	NZH	MLW; DNQ	LVL; DNQ	I70	IRP; DNQ	FLM	GLN	NSV; DNQ	RCH; DNQ	NHA	MAR; DNQ	NWS; DNQ	SON; 18	MMR; 20	PHO; DNQ	LVS; DNQ			32nd	739	
1997	Genzman Racing	25	Ford	WDW; DNQ	TUS; DNQ	HOM	PHO; DNQ	POR; DNQ	EVG; 32	I70	NHA	TEX	BRI; DNQ	NZH	MLW; DNQ	LVL	CNS	HPT						MAR; DNQ	SON	MMR	CAL	PHO	LVS	44th	503	
1997	Ultra Motorsports	12	Ford																IRP; 21	FLM; DNQ	NSV	GLN; DNQ	RCH							44th	503	
2000	CJ Racing	27	Ford	DAY	HOM	PHO	MMR	MAR; DNQ	PIR; 20	GTY; 26	MEM; 26	PPR; 24	EVG; 18	TEX	KEN; 26	GLN	MLW; 19	NHA; 31	NZH	MCH	IRP	NSV	CIC	RCH	DOV	TEX	CAL			31st	780	
