= 1996 NASCAR Craftsman Truck Series =

American motorsport season

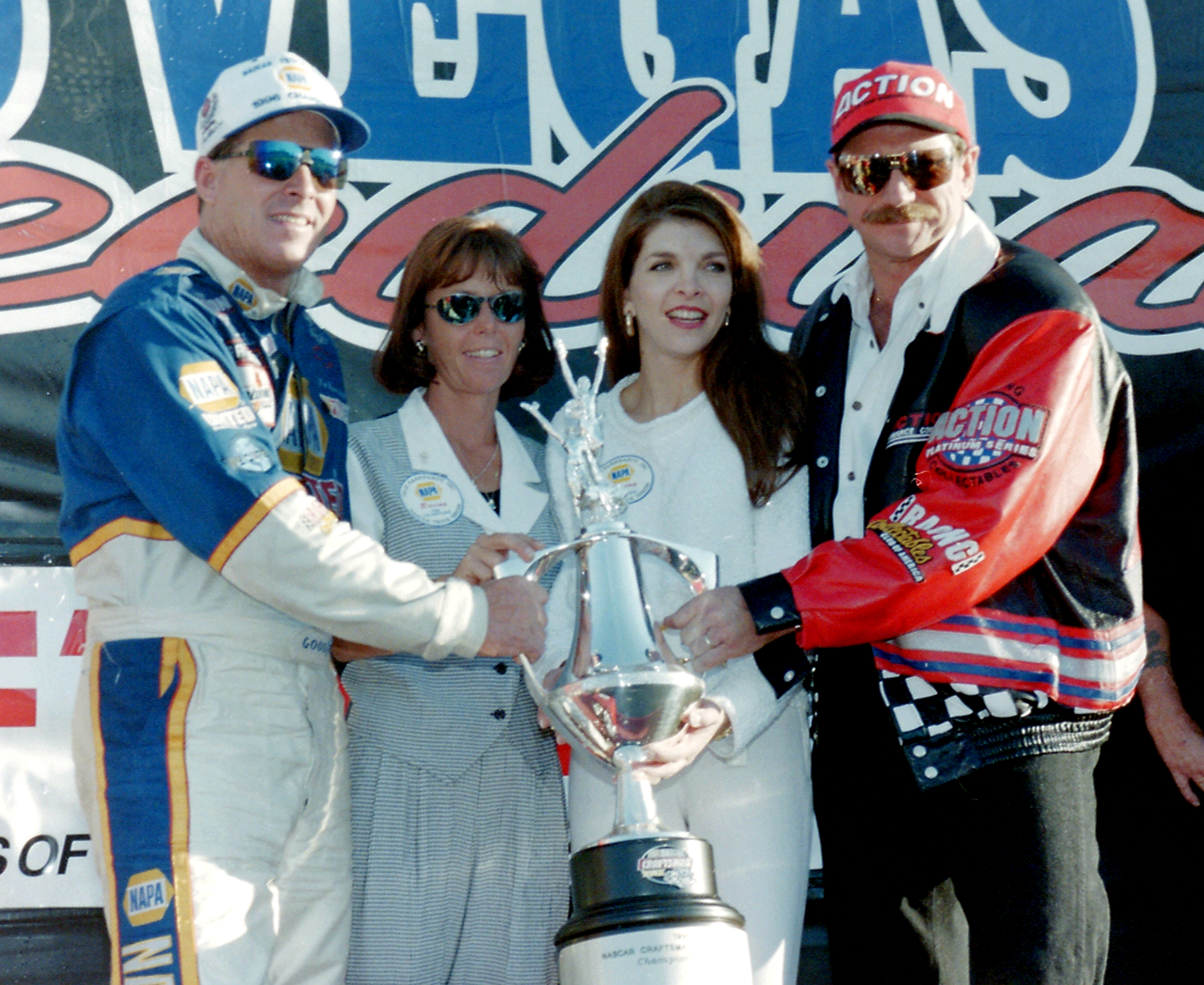
Ron Hornaday Jr., wife Lindy Hornaday, and team owners Teresa and Dale Earnhardt celebrate Hornaday's 1996 Truck Series championship

The 1996 NASCAR Craftsman Truck Series was the second season of the Craftsman Truck Series, the pickup truck racing series sanctioned by NASCAR in the United States. Ron Hornaday Jr. of Dale Earnhardt, Inc. won the championship.

ESPN and TNN broadcast eight races each. CBS carried five races while TBS aired three races.

== Teams and drivers ==
=== Full-time schedule ===
List of full-time teams at the start of 1996.

Team	Truck(s)	No.	Driver(s)	Listed owner(s)
AAG Racing	Chevrolet C/K	65	Kenny Allen	Shiela Allen
Brevak Racing	Ford F-150	31	Bob Brevak	Shelly Brevak
Carnes-Cox-Higgs Racing	Chevrolet C/K	36	Lonnie Cox 14 (R)	Larry Carnes
Chek Racing	Chevrolet C/K	8	John Nemechek	John Nemechek
Chesrown Racing	Chevrolet C/K	6	Rick Carelli	Marshall Chesrown
Clark Racing	Chevrolet C/K	23	T. J. Clark 18	Debbie Clark
Dale Earnhardt, Inc.	Chevrolet C/K	16	Ron Hornaday Jr.	Dale Earnhardt; Teresa Earnhardt
Darrell Waltrip Motorsports	Chevrolet C/K	17	Bill Sedgwick 23	Darrell Waltrip
Darrell Waltrip Motorsports	Chevrolet C/K	17	Ken Schrader 1	Darrell Waltrip
Dokken Racing	Chevrolet C/K	64	Michael Dokken 18	Wayne Dokken
Geoff Bodine Racing	Ford F-150	7	Dave Rezendes	Geoff Bodine
Grandaddy Racing	Dodge Ram	30	Jimmy Hensley	Grier Lackey
Hendrick Motorsports	Chevrolet C/K	24	Jack Sprague	Rick Hendrick
Irvan-Simo Racing	Ford F-150	44	Bryan Reffner (R)	Mark Simo
K Automotive Racing	Dodge Ram	29	Bob Keselowski	Ron Keselowski
Liberty Racing	Ford F-150	98	Butch Miller 20	Jim Herrick
Liberty Racing	Ford F-150	98	Dorsey Schroeder 1	Jim Herrick
Liberty Racing	Ford F-150	98	Kenny Irwin Jr. 3	Jim Herrick
Richard Childress Racing	Chevrolet C/K	3	Mike Skinner	Richard Childress
Penske Racing	Ford F-150	22	Ricky Johnson 4	Roger Penske
Penske Racing	Ford F-150	22	Kenny Wallace 6	Roger Penske
Penske Racing	Ford F-150	22	Rusty Wallace 1	Roger Penske
Petty Enterprises	Dodge Ram	43	Rich Bickle	Richard Petty
Roush Racing	Ford F-150	80	Joe Ruttman	Jack Roush
RPM Racing	Ford F-150	11	Mike Hurlbert	Mike Hurlbert
Spears Motorsports	Chevrolet C/K	75	Bobby Gill 11 (R)	Wayne Spears
Spears Motorsports	Chevrolet C/K	75	Nathan Buttke 13	Wayne Spears
Ultra Motorsports	Ford F-150	2	Mike Bliss	Marlene Smith
Venable Racing	Ford F-150	21	Doug George (R)	Jim Venable
Walker Evans Racing	Dodge Ram	19	Lance Norick 14 (R)	Phyllis Evans
Walker Evans Racing	Dodge Ram	19	Butch Miller 3	Phyllis Evans
Walker Evans Racing	Dodge Ram	19	Johnny Chapman 2	Phyllis Evans
Walker Evans Racing	Dodge Ram	20	Walker Evans	Phyllis Evans

=== Part-Time schedule ===
Team	Truck(s)	No.	Driver(s)	Listed Owner(s)	Rounds
Arne Henriksen	Ford F-150	73	Bob Schacht	Arne Henriksen	1
B & R Racing	Chevrolet C/K	27	Terry McCarthy (R)	Cheryl Cox	2
Bernie Cox	Chevrolet C/K	05	Monty Klein	Bernie Cox	1
Billy Ballew Motorsports	Ford F-150	15	Mark Gibson	Billy Ballew	8
Billy Ballew Motorsports	Ford F-150	15	Bobby Gill (R)	Billy Ballew	3
Billy Ballew Motorsports	Ford F-150	15	Ricky Johnson	Billy Ballew	5
Billy Ogle Jr.	Chevrolet C/K	01	Billy Ogle Jr.	Billy Ogle Jr.	3
Billy Ogle Jr.	Chevrolet C/K	81	Billy Ogle Jr.	Billy Ogle Jr.	1
Black Tip Racing	Chevrolet C/K	00	Frank Kimmel	Andy Campbell	5
Blake Racing	Chevrolet C/K	12	Dave Smith (R)	Bob Blake	6
Bob Best	Chevrolet C/K	33	Harry Gant	Bob Best	11
Brevak Racing	Ford F-150	1	Ken Bouchard	Bob Brevak	1
Carl Wegner	Chevrolet C/K	68	Bobby Dotter	Carl Wegner	2
Charles Zahn	Ford F-150	50	Mark Day	Charles Zahn	1
Chesrown Racing	Chevrolet C/K	66	Wally Dallenbach Jr.	Marshall Chesrown	1
Chesrown Racing	Chevrolet C/K	66	Mike McLaughlin	Marshall Chesrown	1
Combs Racing	Chevrolet C/K	49	Rodney Combs Jr. (R)	Susan Combs	2
Combs Racing	Chevrolet C/K	49	Rodney Combs	Susan Combs	1
Coulter Racing	Chevrolet C/K	61	Randy Tolsma	Steve Coulter	2
Courtney Register	Chevrolet C/K	32	Steve Mendenhall (R)	Courtney Register	5
Dale Earnhardt, Inc.	Chevrolet C/K	76	Steve Park	Dale Earnhardt	1
Dan Obrist	Chevrolet C/K	73	Dan Obrist	Dan Obrist	1
Darrell Waltrip Motorsports	Chevrolet C/K	5	Darrell Waltrip	Darrell Waltrip	5
Del Markle	Chevrolet C/K	71	Rick Markle (R)	Del Markle	2
Dollar Motorsports	Ford F-150	14	Marc Robe	David Dollar	1
Dollar Motorsports	Ford F-150	74	Marc Robe	David Dollar	2
Doran Racing	Chevrolet C/K	77	Scott Lagasse	Kevin Doran	4
Doran Racing	Chevrolet C/K	77	Gary St. Amant	Kevin Doran	1
Doran Racing	Chevrolet C/K	77	Bobby Labonte	Kevin Doran	1
Elliott Racing	Ford F-150	94	Ron Barfield Jr. (R)	Bill Elliott	7
Ernie Cope Racing	Chevrolet C/K	38	Ernie Cope	Gina Cope	4
Foyt Enterprises	Ford F-150	51	A. J. Foyt	A. J. Foyt	1
Foyt Enterprises	Ford F-150	56	A. J. Foyt	A. J. Foyt	1
Gary Miller	Chevrolet C/K	34	Jerry Robertson (R)	Gary Miller	1
Genzman Racing	Ford F-150	25	Andy Genzman	DeWilton Genzman	13
Geoff Bodine Racing	Ford F-150	07	Geoff Bodine	Geoff Bodine	4
Geoff Bodine Racing	Ford F-150	07	Barry Bodine	Geoff Bodine	2
Gerhart Racing	Chevrolet C/K	85	Bobby Gerhart	Bobby Gerhart	3
Glanville Motorsports	Ford F-150	81	Jerry Glanville	Jerry Glanville	5
Grandaddy Racing	Dodge Ram	03	Kelly Denton	Grier Lackey	2
Grubb Motorsports	Chevrolet C/K	4	Wayne Grubb	Kevin Grubb	2
Grubb Motorsports	Chevrolet C/K	55	Kevin Grubb	Kevin Grubb	2
Irvan-Simo Racing	Ford F-150	28	Boris Said	Mark Simo	3
Irvan-Simo Racing	Ford F-150	28	Ernie Irvan	Mark Simo	3
Irvan-Simo Racing	Ford F-150	28	Butch Miller	Mark Simo	1
Jimmy Davis	Ford F-150	13	Jimmy Davis	Jimmy Davis	2
Joe Bessey Motorsports	Chevrolet C/K	9	Joe Bessey	Joe Bessey	1
Joe Horner	Chevrolet C/K	32	Kenny Hendrick	Joe Horner	4
Joe Madore	Chevrolet C/K	60	Joe Madore (R)	Joe Madore	5
Ken Schrader Racing	Chevrolet C/K	52	Ken Schrader	Ken Schrader	3
Ken Schrader Racing	Chevrolet C/K	52	Tobey Butler	Ken Schrader	6
Liberty Racing	Ford F-150	62	Kenny Irwin Jr.	Jim Herrick	1
Mansion Motorsports	Ford F-150	01	Gary Lloyd	Thee Dixon	2
Mansion Motorsports	Ford F-150	01	Randy MacDonald	Thee Dixon	2
Mansion Motorsports	Ford F-150	0	Gary Lloyd	Thee Dixon	5
Mansion Motorsports	Ford F-150	0	John Blewett III	Thee Dixon	1
MB Motorsports	Ford F-150	26	Kenny Irwin Jr.	Mike Mittler	1
MB Motorsports	Ford F-150	26	Randy Porter	Mike Mittler	1
MB Motorsports	Ford F-150	26	Rick Beebe	Mike Mittler	2
MB Motorsports	Ford F-150	26	Michael Dokken	Mike Mittler	1
MB Motorsports	Ford F-150	26	Ken Bouchard	Mike Mittler	1
McCray Racing	Chevrolet C/K	02	Rick McCray	Rick McCray	4
Michael Waltrip Racing	Ford F-150	1	Michael Waltrip	Michael Waltrip	1
Mike Colabucci	Chevrolet C/K	1	Mike Colabucci	Mike Colabucci	1
Mike Colabucci	Chevrolet C/K	10	Mike Colabucci	Mike Colabucci	2
Mike Colabucci	Chevrolet C/K	10	Curtis Markham	Mike Colabucci	1
Mike Colabucci	Chevrolet C/K	15	Mike Collabucci	Mike Colabucci	1
Mike Harvick	Chevrolet C/K	72	Kevin Harvick (R)	Mike Harvick	4
MJ Racing	Chevrolet C/K	39	Jeff Spraker	Milo Januska	3
Mountanos Racing	Chevrolet C/K	38	Mark Mountanos	Linda Mountanos	1
Mountanos Racing	Chevrolet C/K	83	Steve Portenga	Linda Mountanos	6
Mueller Brothers Racing	Chevrolet C/K	4	Robbie Reiser	Mueller Brothers	1
Mueller Brothers Racing	Chevrolet C/K	4	Tony Stewart	Mueller Brothers	1
Mueller Brothers Racing	Chevrolet C/K	42	Robbie Reiser	Mueller Brothers	2
NEMCO Motorsports	Chevrolet C/K	87	Joe Nemechek	Joe Nemechek	2
Norick Racing	Ford F-150	90	Lance Norick (R)	Ron Norick	10
Press Racing	Chevrolet C/K	53	Dan Press	Dan Press	7
Proctor Racing	Ford F-150	5	Jerry Robertson (R)	Rudy Proctor	1
Randy Dixon		04	Ernest Winslow	Randy Dixon	2
Richard Childress Racing	Chevrolet C/K	03	Jay Sauter (R)	Richard Childress	1
Rizzo Racing	Ford F-150	27	Rob Rizzo	Rob Rizzo	4
Roehrig Motorsports	Chevrolet C/K	18	Johnny Benson	Kurt Roehrig	4
Roehrig Motorsports	Chevrolet C/K	18	David Green	Kurt Roehrig	1
Roehrig Motorsports	Chevrolet C/K	18	Steve Park	Kurt Roehrig	1
Roehrig Motorsports	Chevrolet C/K	18	Michael Dokken	Kurt Roehrig	1
Roehrig Motorsports	Chevrolet C/K	18	Robby Gordon	Kurt Roehrig	1
Rosenblum Racing	Chevrolet C/K	51	Ritchie Petty	Jim Rosenblum	1
Rosenblum Racing	Chevrolet C/K	51	T.J. Clark	Jim Rosenblum	1
Rosenblum Racing	Chevrolet C/K	51	Perry Tripp	Jim Rosenblum	2
Roush Racing	Ford F-150	99	Jeff Burton	Jack Roush	4
Roush Racing	Ford F-150	99	Mark Martin	Jack Roush	2
Roush Racing	Ford F-150	99	Ted Musgrave	Jack Roush	2
Sellers Motorsports	Ford F-150	78	Mike Chase	Steven Sellers	8
Serrano Racing	Chevrolet C/K	40	Carlos Serrano	Carlos Serrano	3
Shenandoah Valley Motorsports	Ford F-150	1	Ronnie Newman	Harry Johnson	1
Shenandoah Valley Motorsports	Ford F-150	11	Joe Gaita (R)	Harry Johnson	2
Shenandoah Valley Motorsports	Ford F-150	71	Joe Gaita (R)	Harry Johnson	3
Shenandoah Valley Motorsports	Ford F-150	71	Dave Stacy	Harry Johnson	1
SKB Racing	Chevrolet C/K	92	Charlie Cragan (R)	Raymond Scanlan	9
SKB Racing	Chevrolet C/K	92	Rodney Combs Jr. (R)	Raymond Scanlan	1
Spicer Racing	Chevrolet C/K	48	Casey Atwood	Chuck Spicer	1
Spicer Racing	Chevrolet C/K	48	Bobby Hamilton	Chuck Spicer	2
Star Nursery Racing Team	Chevrolet C/K	0	Chris Trickle	Chuck Trickle	2
Strait Racing	Ford F-150	37	Bob Strait	Jim Spicuzza	1
Stroppe Motorsports	Ford F-150	14	Butch Gilliland (R)	Bill Stroppe	8
Team SABCO	Chevrolet C/K	42	Jay Sauter (R)	Felix Sabates	7
Team SABCO	Chevrolet C/K	42	Robby Gordon	Felix Sabates	1
Thorpe Motorsports	Chevrolet C/K	84	Doug Thorpe Jr. (R)	Doug Thorpe Jr.	2
ThorSport Racing	Chevrolet C/K	88	Terry Cook	Duke Thorson	5
Toy Box Racing	Dodge Ram	59	Mark Gibson	Mark Gibson	1
True Dee Paques	Chevrolet C/K	09	Jon Paques	True Dee Paques	3
Turnage Racing	Ford F-150	41	Randy Renfrow	Greg Turnage	10
Ultra Motorsports	Ford F-150	4	Bill Elliott	Jim Smith	1
USA Racing	Chevrolet C/K	9	Davy Jones	Wilbur Bunce	1
USA Racing	Chevrolet C/K	9	Greg Marlowe	Wilbur Bunce	1
USA Racing	Chevrolet C/K	9	Michael Dokken	Wilbur Bunce	1
USA Racing	Chevrolet C/K	9	Andy Michner	Wilbur Bunce	1
Venturini Motorsports	Chevrolet C/K	35	Bill Venturini	Cathy Venturini	1
Vestar Motorsports	Chevrolet C/K	1	Andy Hillenburg	Scoop Vessels	2
Walker Evans Racing	Dodge Ram	02	Johnny Chapman	Walker Evans	2
Walker Evans Racing	Dodge Ram	02	Steve Park	Walker Evans	1
Wayne Jacks	Chevrolet C/K	58	Wayne Jacks	Wayne Jacks	3

== Schedule ==
No.	Race title	Track	Date
1	Florida Dodge Dealers 400	Homestead–Miami Speedway, Homestead	March 17
2	Chevrolet Desert Star 300	Phoenix International Raceway, Phoenix	April 21
3	Craftsman 200	Portland Speedway, Portland	May 4
4	Jerr-Dan/Nelson Truck 200	Evergreen Speedway, Monroe	May 11
5	NAPA 200	Tucson Raceway Park, Tucson	May 25
6	Colorado 250	Colorado National Speedway, Dacono	June 1
7	Lund Look 225	Heartland Park Topeka, Topeka	June 9
8	Coca-Cola 200	Bristol Motor Speedway, Bristol	June 22
9	DeVilbiss Superfinish 200	Nazareth Speedway, Nazareth	June 30
10	Sears Auto Center 200	Milwaukee Mile, West Allis	July 6
11	Ford Dealers 225	Louisville Motor Speedway, Louisville	July 20
12	Western Auto 200	I-70 Speedway, Odessa	July 27
13	Cummins 200	Indianapolis Raceway Park, Brownsburg	August 1
14	Stevens Beil/Genuine Parts 200	Flemington Speedway, Flemington	August 10
15	Parts America 150	Watkins Glen International, Watkins Glen	August 25
16	Federated Auto Parts 250	Nashville Speedway USA, Nashville	August 31
17	Fas Mart Truck Shootout	Richmond International Raceway, Richmond	September 5
18	Pennzoil/VIP Tripleheader	New Hampshire International Speedway, Loudon	September 8
19	Hanes 250	Martinsville Speedway, Ridgeway	September 21
20	Lowe's 250	North Wilkesboro, North Wilkesboro	September 28
21	Kragen 151	Sears Point Raceway, Sonoma	October 5
22	Ford Dealers/Ford Credit 300	Mesa Marin Raceway, Bakersfield	October 13
23	GM Goodwrench/AC Delco 300	Phoenix International Raceway, Phoenix	October 26
24	Carquest 420K	Las Vegas Motor Speedway, Las Vegas	November 3

== Races ==
=== Florida Dodge Dealers 400 ===
The inaugural Florida Dodge Dealers 400 was held March 17 at Homestead–Miami Speedway. Geoff Bodine won the pole. The race was broadcast on TNN.

Top ten results

1. #7 - Dave Rezendes
2. #24 - Jack Sprague
3. #16 - Ron Hornaday Jr.
4. #94 - Ron Barfield Jr.
5. #44 - Bryan Reffner
6. #27 - Terry McCarthy
7. #8 - John Nemechek
8. #42 - Jay Sauter -1
9. #00 - Frank Kimmel -1
10. #21 - Doug George -1

Failed to qualify: #0 - Gary Lloyd, #11 - Mike Hurlbert, #23 - T.J. Clark, #25 - Andy Genzman, #55 - Randy Churchill, #59 - Mark Gibson, #70 - G. T. Dallas, #78 - Mike Chase, #82 - Guy Thomas, #84 - Doug Thorpe Jr.

=== Chevrolet Desert Star 300 ===
The Chevrolet Desert Star 300 was held April 21 at Phoenix International Raceway. Mike Skinner won the pole. The race was broadcast on TNN.

Top ten results

1. #24 - Jack Sprague
2. #3 - Mike Skinner
3. #98 - Butch Miller
4. #44 - Bryan Reffner
5. #16 - Ron Hornaday Jr.
6. #6 - Rick Carelli
7. #80 - Joe Ruttman
8. #94 - Ron Barfield Jr.
9. #75 - Bobby Gill
10. #64 - Michael Dokken -1

Failed to qualify: #02 - Rick McCray, #60 - Joe Madore, #65 - Kenny Allen, #70 - G. T. Dallas

=== Craftsman 200 ===
The Craftsman 200 was held May 4 at Portland Speedway. Rich Bickle won the pole. The race was broadcast by TBS.

Top ten results

1. #16 - Ron Hornaday Jr.
2. #2 - Mike Bliss
3. #3 - Mike Skinner
4. #17 - Bill Sedgwick
5. #98 - Butch Miller
6. #6 - Rick Carelli
7. #44 - Bryan Reffner
8. #24 - Jack Sprague
9. #80 - Joe Ruttman
10. #30 - Jimmy Hensley

Failed to qualify: #60 - Joe Madore

=== Jerr-Dan/Nelson Truck 200 ===
The Jerr-Dan/Nelson Truck 200 was held May 11 at Evergreen Speedway. Tobey Butler won the pole. The race was broadcast on TBS.

Top ten results

1. #2 - Mike Bliss
2. #16 - Ron Hornaday Jr.
3. #53 - Dan Press
4. #43 - Rich Bickle
5. #3 - Mike Skinner
6. #52 - Tobey Butler
7. #30 - Jimmy Hensley
8. #80 - Joe Ruttman
9. #94 - Ron Barfield Jr.
10. #17 - Bill Sedgwick -1

Failed to qualify: none

=== NAPA 200 ===
The NAPA 200 was held May 25 at Tucson Raceway Park. Bryan Reffner won the pole. The race was broadcast on ESPN.

Top ten results

1. #3 - Mike Skinner
2. #43 - Rich Bickle
3. #16 - Ron Hornaday Jr.
4. #30 - Jimmy Hensley
5. #24 - Jack Sprague
6. #17 - Bill Sedgwick
7. #75 - Bobby Gill
8. #7 - Dave Rezendes
9. #64 - Michael Dokken
10. #29 - Bob Keselowski

Failed to qualify: none

=== Colorado 250 ===
The Colorado 250 was held June 1 at Colorado National Speedway. Rich Bickle won the pole. The race was broadcast on CBS.

Top ten results

1. #3 - Mike Skinner
2. #98 - Butch Miller
3. #30 - Jimmy Hensley
4. #24 - Jack Sprague
5. #7 - Dave Rezendes
6. #80 - Joe Ruttman
7. #17 - Bill Sedgwick
8. #16 - Ron Hornaday Jr.
9. #42 - Jay Sauter
10. #21 - Doug George

Failed to qualify: #11 - Mike Hurlbert, #22 - Ricky Johnson, #58 - Wayne Jacks

=== Lund Look 225 ===
The Lund Look 225 was held June 9 at Heartland Park Topeka. Ron Hornaday Jr. won the pole. The race was broadcast on TNN.

Top ten results

1. #3 - Mike Skinner
2. #24 - Jack Sprague
3. #16 - Ron Hornaday Jr.
4. #2 - Mike Bliss
5. #42 - Jay Sauter
6. #18 - Johnny Benson
7. #52 - Ken Schrader
8. #99 - Jeff Burton
9. #7 - Dave Rezendes
10. #17 - Bill Sedgwick

Failed to qualify: none

=== Coca-Cola 200 ===
The Coca-Cola 200 was held June 22 at Bristol Motor Speedway. Mike Skinner won the pole. On lap 162 Mike Bliss crashed on the front stretch where he hit and rode up the wall and tore down a part of the catch fencing. The race was broadcast on ESPN.

Top ten results

1. #6 - Rick Carelli
2. #7 - Dave Rezendes
3. #42 - Jay Sauter
4. #3 - Mike Skinner
5. #24 - Jack Sprague
6. #80 - Joe Ruttman
7. #75 - Bobby Gill
8. #16 - Ron Hornaday Jr.
9. #19 - Lance Norick -1
10. #20 - Walker Evans -1

Failed to qualify: none

=== DeVilbiss Superfinish 200 ===
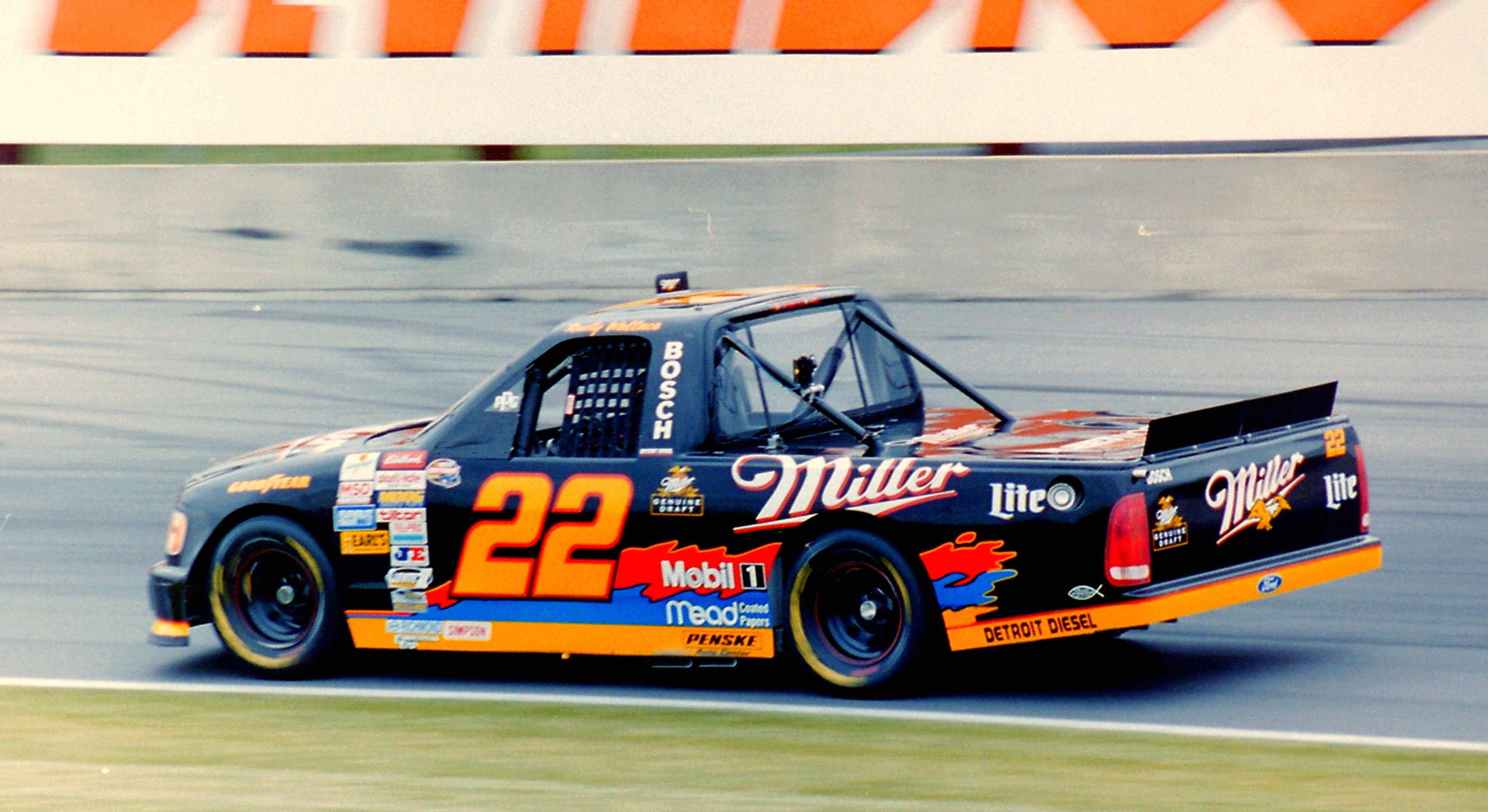
Rusty Wallace racing in the DeVilbiss Superfinish 200 at Nazareth

The inaugural DeVilibiss Superfinish 200 was held June 30 at Nazareth Speedway. Jimmy Hensley won the pole. The race was supposed to air on CBS; however, after a 3 hour rain delay, CBS left the speedway, and therefore the race was not broadcast. The event wouldn't be shown in its entirety until July 2025, when the full race was posted on YouTube. The race was shortened to 152 laps due to rain.

Top ten results

1. #24 - Jack Sprague
2. #30 - Jimmy Hensley
3. #98 - Butch Miller
4. #99 - Jeff Burton
5. #16 - Ron Hornaday Jr.
6. #18 - Johnny Benson
7. #80 - Joe Ruttman
8. #07 - Geoff Bodine
9. #22 - Rusty Wallace*
10. #44 - Bryan Reffner

Failed to qualify: none

- Rusty Wallace made his only career Truck Series start in this race.

=== Sears Auto Center 200 ===
The Sears Auto Center 200 was held July 6 at Milwaukee Mile. Mike Bliss won the pole. The race was broadcast on CBS.

Top ten results

1. #24 - Jack Sprague
2. #17 - Bill Sedgwick
3. #16 - Ron Hornaday Jr.
4. #30 - Jimmy Hensley
5. #2 - Mike Bliss
6. #75 - Bobby Gill
7. #3 - Mike Skinner
8. #7 - Dave Rezendes -1
9. #15 - Mark Gibson -2
10. #65 - Kenny Allen -2

Failed to qualify: #25 - Andy Genzman, #69 - Frank Davis

- ThorSport Racing made its NASCAR debut in this race, entering the #88 Chevy with driver Terry Cook. Cook started 24th and finished 12th.

=== Ford Dealers 225 ===
The Ford Dealers 225 was held July 20 at Louisville Motor Speedway. Mike Bliss won the pole. The race was broadcast on CBS.

Top ten results

1. #16 - Ron Hornaday Jr.
2. #3 - Mike Skinner
3. #30 - Jimmy Hensley
4. #7 - Dave Rezendes
5. #80 - Joe Ruttman
6. #44 - Bryan Reffner
7. #6 - Rick Carelli
8. #24 - Jack Sprague
9. #98 - Butch Miller
10. #8 - John Nemechek

Failed to qualify: #01 - Billy Ogle Jr., #25 - Andy Genzman

=== Western Auto 200 ===
The Western Auto 200 was held July 27 at I-70 Speedway. Butch Miller won the pole. The race was broadcast on TNN.

Top ten results

1. #2 - Mike Bliss
2. #3 - Mike Skinner
3. #6 - Rick Carelli
4. #16 - Ron Hornaday Jr.
5. #17 - Bill Sedgwick
6. #21 - Doug George
7. #75 - Nathan Buttke -1
8. #30 - Jimmy Hensley -1
9. #7 - Dave Rezendes -1
10. #43 - Rich Bickle -1

Failed to qualify: none

- On lap 121, Bob Keselowski crashed in turn 1, broke the wall and rolled down the banking 2 1/2 times. Keselowski was unhurt.

=== Cummins 200 ===
The Cummins 200 was held August 1 at Indianapolis Raceway Park. Mike Skinner won the pole. The race was broadcast on ESPN.

Top ten results

1. #3 - Mike Skinner*
2. #24 - Jack Sprague
3. #2 - Mike Bliss
4. #16 - Ron Hornaday Jr.
5. #43 - Rich Bickle
6. #42 - Jay Sauter
7. #22 - Kenny Wallace
8. #75 - Nathan Buttke
9. #66 - Mike McLaughlin
10. #4 - Tony Stewart

Failed to qualify: #25 - Andy Genzman, #26 - Rick Beebe, #41 - Randy Renfrow, #88 - Terry Cook, Mike Wallace

- Mike Skinner lead flag to flag (all 200 laps).

=== Stevens Beil/Genuine Parts 200 ===
The Stevens Beil/Genuine Parts 200 was held August 10 at Flemington Speedway. Bryan Reffner won the pole. The race was broadcast on TNN.

Top ten results

1. #3 - Mike Skinner
2. #2 - Mike Bliss
3. #43 - Rich Bickle
4. #7 - Dave Rezendes
5. #24 - Jack Sprague
6. #16 - Ron Hornaday Jr.
7. #6 - Rick Carelli
8. #33 - Harry Gant
9. #30 - Jimmy Hensley
10. #98 - Butch Miller -1

Failed to qualify: #11 - Mike Hurlbert, Danny Hieber

=== Parts America 150 ===
The Parts America 150 was held August 25 at Watkins Glen International. Steve Park won the pole qualifying the truck driven by Joe Nemechek. The race was broadcast on ESPN.

Top ten results

1. #16 - Ron Hornaday Jr.
2. #87 - Joe Nemechek
3. #3 - Mike Skinner
4. #24 - Jack Sprague
5. #43 - Rich Bickle
6. #80 - Joe Ruttman
7. #27 - Rob Rizzo
8. #30 - Jimmy Hensley
9. #21 - Doug George
10. #20 - Walker Evans

Failed to qualify: none

=== Federated Auto Parts 250 ===
The Federated Auto Parts 250 was held August 31 at Nashville Speedway USA. Jack Sprague won the pole. The race was broadcast on TNN.

Top ten results

1. #7 - Dave Rezendes
2. #16 - Ron Hornaday Jr.
3. #24 - Jack Sprague
4. #98 - Butch Miller
5. #44 - Bryan Reffner
6. #21 - Doug George
7. #64 - Michael Dokken
8. #30 - Jimmy Hensley
9. #6 - Rick Carelli
10. #2 - Mike Bliss -1

Failed to qualify: #25 - Andy Genzman, Brandon Baker

=== Fas Mart Truck Shootout ===
The Fas Mart Truck Shootout was held September 5 at Richmond International Raceway. Kenny Irwin Jr. won the pole. The race was shortened to 124 laps due to rain from Hurricane Fran. The race was broadcast on ESPN.

Top ten results

1. #3 - Mike Skinner
2. #16 - Ron Hornaday Jr.
3. #99 - Mark Martin
4. #80 - Joe Ruttman
5. #62 - Kenny Irwin Jr.
6. #75 - Nathan Buttke
7. #98 - Butch Miller
8. #33 - Harry Gant
9. #5 - Darrell Waltrip
10. #52 - Tobey Butler

Failed to qualify: #10 - Mike Colabucci, #25 - Andy Genzman, #90 - Lance Norick, Danny Hieber

=== Pennzoil/VIP Tripleheader ===
The Pennzoil/VIP Tripleheader was held September 8 at New Hampshire International Speedway. Mike Skinner won the pole. The race was broadcast on TNN.

Top ten results

1. #16 - Ron Hornaday Jr.
2. #24 - Jack Sprague
3. #2 - Mike Bliss
4. #18 - Steve Park
5. #28 - Ernie Irvan
6. #9 - Joe Bessey
7. #44 - Bryan Reffner
8. #80 - Joe Ruttman
9. #30 - Jimmy Hensley -1
10. #17 - Bill Sedgwick -1

Failed to qualify: none

=== Hanes 250 ===
The Hanes 250 was held September 21 at Martinsville Speedway. Bobby Hamilton won the pole. The race was broadcast on ESPN.

Top ten results

1. #3 - Mike Skinner
2. #98 - Butch Miller
3. #24 - Jack Sprague
4. #16 - Ron Hornaday Jr.
5. #5 - Darrell Waltrip
6. #80 - Joe Ruttman
7. #43 - Rich Bickle
8. #99 - Jeff Burton
9. #30 - Jimmy Hensley
10. #33 - Harry Gant

Failed to qualify: #0 - Gary Lloyd, #01 - Billy Ogle Jr., #04 - Ernest Winslow, #11 - Mike Hurlbert, #25 - Andy Genzman, #39 - Jeff Spraker, #53 - Dan Press, #61 - George Kent

=== Lowe's 250 ===
The final Lowe's 250 was held September 28 at North Wilkesboro Speedway. Johnny Benson won the pole. The race was broadcast on ESPN.

Top ten results

1. #99 - Mark Martin
2. #24 - Jack Sprague
3. #98 - Butch Miller
4. #22 - Kenny Wallace
5. #80 - Joe Ruttman
6. #6 - Rick Carelli
7. #18 - Johnny Benson
8. #43 - Rich Bickle
9. #3 - Mike Skinner
10. #5 - Darrell Waltrip

Failed to qualify: #0 - Gary Lloyd, #04 - Ernest Winslow, #1 - Ronnie Newman, #11 - Mike Hurlbert, #12 - Dave Smith, #23 - T. J. Clark, #25 - Andy Genzman, #32 - Steve Mendenhall, #50 - Charles Zahn, #54 - Steve McEachern, #63 - Cindy Peterson, #71 - Rick Markle, #81 - Billy Ogle Jr., #82 - Clint Mears, #89 - Jason Jarrett, #90 - Lance Norick, #91 - Brad Means, Greg Clark

=== Kragen 151 ===
The Kragen 151 was held October 5 at Sears Point Raceway. Mike Skinner won the pole. The race was broadcast on ESPN.

Top ten results

1. #7 - Dave Rezendes
2. #16 - Ron Hornaday Jr.
3. #3 - Mike Skinner
4. #80 - Joe Ruttman
5. #21 - Doug George
6. #24 - Jack Sprague
7. #2 - Mike Bliss
8. #44 - Bryan Reffner
9. #6 - Rick Carelli
10. #30 - Jimmy Hensley

Failed to qualify: Bob Strait

=== Ford Dealers/Ford Credit 300 ===
The Ford Dealers/Ford Credit 300 was held October 13 at Mesa Marin Raceway. Ron Hornaday Jr. won the pole. The race was broadcast on TNN.

Top ten results

1. #3 - Mike Skinner
2. #16 - Ron Hornaday Jr.
3. #80 - Joe Ruttman
4. #2 - Mike Bliss
5. #24 - Jack Sprague
6. #19 - Butch Miller
7. #21 - Doug George
8. #43 - Rich Bickle
9. #20 - Walker Evans -1
10. #7 - Dave Rezendes -1

Failed to qualify: none

=== GM Goodwrench/AC Delco 300 ===
The GM Goodwrench/AC Delco 300 was held October 26 at Phoenix International Raceway. Jack Sprague won the pole. The race was broadcast on TBS.

Top ten results

1. #24 - Jack Sprague
2. #18 - Johnny Benson
3. #80 - Joe Ruttman
4. #3 - Mike Skinner
5. #99 - Ted Musgrave
6. #52 - Tobey Butler
7. #16 - Ron Hornaday Jr.
8. #87 - Joe Nemechek
9. #21 - Doug George
10. #33 - Harry Gant

Failed to qualify: #0 - Chris Trickle, #02 - Rick McCray, #9 - Ron Emmick, #09 - Jon Paques, #11 - Mike Hurlbert, #14 - Butch Gilliland, #23 - T. J. Clark, #25 - Andy Genzman, #29 - Bob Keselowski, #41 - Randy Renfrow, #55 - Doug Adams, #63 - Cindy Peterson, #65 - Kenny Allen, #70 - G. T. Dallas, #74 - Marc Robe

=== Carquest 420K ===
The Carquest 420K was held November 3 at Las Vegas Motor Speedway. Bryan Reffner won the pole. The race was broadcast on CBS.

Top ten results

1. #24 - Jack Sprague
2. #4 - Bill Elliott
3. #80 - Joe Ruttman
4. #1 - Michael Waltrip
5. #7 - Dave Rezendes
6. #18 - Robby Gordon
7. #3 - Mike Skinner
8. #52 - Ken Schrader
9. #44 - Bryan Reffner
10. #16 - Ron Hornaday Jr.

Failed to qualify: #00 - Frank Kimmel, #0 - Chris Trickle, #09 - Jon Paques, #10 - Mike Colabucci, #11 - Mike Hurlbert, #12 - Dave Smith, #14 - Butch Gilliland, #20 - Walker Evans, #25 - Andy Genzman, #26 - Ken Bouchard, #36 - Lonnie Cox, #41 - Randy Renfrow, #51 - Perry Tripp, #61 - Randy Tolsma, #65 - Kenny Allen, #68 - Bobby Dotter, #70 - G.T. Dallas, #71 - Stacy Compton, #74 - Marc Robe, #88 - Terry Cook, #92 - Rodney Combs Jr.

== Final points standings ==
=== Drivers ===
Pos.	Driver	Races																								Points
Pos.	Driver	HOM	PHO	POR	EVG	TUS	CNS	HPT	BRI	NZH	MLW	LVL	I70	IRP	FLM	GLN	NSV	RCH	NHA	MAR	NWS	SON	MMR	PHO	LVS	Points
1	Ron Hornaday Jr.	3	5	1*	2	3	8	**3**	8	5	3	1*	4*	4	6	1*	2	2	1	4	22	2	**2***	7	10	3831
2	Jack Sprague	2	1*	8	12	5	4	2	5	1	1*	8	14	2	5	4	**3**	29	2*	3	2	6	5	**1***	1*	3778
3	Mike Skinner	20*	**2**	3	5	1	1*	1*	**4***	14	7	2	2	**1***	1*	3	16*	1*	**27**	1	9*	**3**	1	4	7	3771
4	Joe Ruttman	19	7	9	8	15	6	23	6	7	17	5	20	22	27	6	13	4	8	6	5	4	3	3	3	3275
5	Mike Bliss	27	28	2	1*	19	23	4	21	11	**5**	**13**	1	3	2	22	10	20	3	16	12	7	4	14	12	3190
6	Dave Rezendes	1	22	32	11	8	5	9	2	12	8	4	9	16	4	23	1	11	23	12	32	1*	10	22	5	3179
7	Butch Miller	24	3	5	27	16	2	19	11	3	27	9	**11**	13	10	11	4	7	26	2	3	26	6	13	13	3126
8	Jimmy Hensley	26	27	10	7	4	3	28	25	**2***	4	3	8	25	9	8	8	13	9	9	16	10	18	30	17	3029
9	Bryan Reffner **(R)**	5	4	7	24	**11**	16	14	23	10	24	6	12	20	**12**	13	5	19	7	17	34	8	13	18	**9**	2961
10	Rick Carelli	16	6	6	13	23	19	24	1	16	11	7	3	18	7	24	9	15	13	29	6	9	34	16	14	2953
11	Rich Bickle	21	30	**27**	4	2*	**32**	12	19	15	20	27	10	5	3	5	18	16	12	7	8	29	8	11	11	2914
12	Doug George **(R)**	10	19	14	14	21	10	17	14	22	19	18	6	28	15	9	6	24	21	13	15	5	7	9	16	2883
13	John Nemechek	7	14	12	20	17	12	21	20	20	29	10	16	26	14	16	21	27	20	14	19	16	19	17	27	2615
14	Bill Sedgwick	30	18	4	10	6	7	10	28	28	2	17	5	30	11	14	23	21	10	34	17	20	29	23		2599
15	Bob Brevak	11	13	26	18	24	14	20	24	26	15	22	21	19	21	21	15	28	18	25	28	19	23	32	25	2388
16	Bob Keselowski	32	34	16	16	10	28	27	16	34	13	31	23	21	18	18	11	33	19	19	24	17	28	DNQ	18	2281
17	Walker Evans	28	36	18	23	18	18	16	10	32	30	26	24	27	20	10	17	30	14	30	26	24	9	31	DNQ	2224
18	Lance Norick **(R)**	18	16	24	22	26	24	22	9	29	33	15	17	24	13	28	34	DNQ	25	23	DNQ	13	22	36	31	2168
19	Kenny Allen	34	DNQ	15	17	29	21	26	15	25	10	29	27		16	19	30	26	28	21	36	14	17	DNQ	DNQ	2019
20	Michael Dokken	12	10	17	29	9	29	32	26	23	18	20	25		30		7	31		15	11		27	24	35	1977
21	Bobby Gill **(R)**	23	9	20	26	7	11	15	7	18	6	11					22		11	11						1818
22	T. J. Clark	DNQ	12			20	15	31	22	31		24		23	17	15	33	34		33	DNQ	22	12	DNQ	30	1603
23	Nathan Buttke												7	8	19	29	28	6	17	28	21	27	14	25	33	1345
24	Harry Gant								13	21				12	8		20	8	24	10	31			10	21	1267
25	Mike Hurlbert	DNQ		30	32		DNQ		32	33	34		28	33	DNQ	31	27		30	DNQ	DNQ	32	25	DNQ	DNQ	1081
26	Jay Sauter **(R)**	8	11				9	5	3		25			6											22	1065
27	Lonnie Cox **(R)**			21	31	30	26	29			21	25	18	29	24							31	35		DNQ	1027
28	Charlie Cragan **(R)**	14	31							19	16	19		15	25			35		27						864
29	Ron Barfield Jr. **(R)**	4	8	11	9						28													27	19	837
30	Mark Gibson	DNQ							12		9	14	15	32	23	20		17								820
31	Ricky Johnson			25	15		DNQ									30					27	23	21	15	38	786
32	Andy Genzman	DNQ							17		DNQ	DNQ		DNQ			DNQ	DNQ		DNQ	DNQ	18	20	DNQ	DNQ	739
33	Randy Renfrow								27			21		DNQ	28		26	12		24	35			DNQ	DNQ	733
34	Kenny Wallace							18						7				14			4		33	12		727
35	Mike Chase	DNQ	29	13	19		13	33	30																26	692
36	Tobey Butler				**6**													10			14		31	6	34	686
37	Darrell Waltrip							11										9		5	10				20	660
38	Dan Press			29	3	12	27													DNQ	33		24			657
39	Johnny Benson							6		6											**7**			2		616
40	Butch Gilliland **(R)**	15	24	23	21	25																	30	DNQ	DNQ	611
41	Steve Portenga		15	28	13		17							31								25				591
42	Jeff Burton							8		4				14						8						565
43	Jerry Glanville	22	20			22	22				14															515
44	Frank Kimmel	9						30				12					12								DNQ	502
45	Kenny Irwin Jr.		32															**5**					15	26	40	468
46	Ken Schrader	36						7		13															8	467
47	Dave Smith **(R)**	29	23							24	23										DNQ				DNQ	429
48	Joe Gaita **(R)**					28	30		18	30		23														428
49	Rob Rizzo															7			22			11			37	425
50	Steve Park													11		**QL**			4						15	408
51	Terry Cook										12			DNQ			25							21	DNQ	371
52	Gary Lloyd	DNQ							29						29			25		DNQ	DNQ					366
53	Geoff Bodine	**33**								8						17									39	364
54	Boris Said											16	13										16			354
55	Mark Martin																	3			1					350
56	Scott Lagasse	25								17		30													32	340
57	Ernie Cope			19	28	27	31																			337
58	Kevin Harvick **(R)**		35	31	30																		11			331
59	Johnny Chapman											32	26				29	23								322
60	Ernie Irvan															25			5						29	319
61	Kenny Hendrick																					28	26	35	23	316
62	Joe Nemechek															2								8		312
63	Joe Madore **(R)**		DNQ	DNQ	25								19													301
64	Carlos Serrano		21		14																			28		300
65	Robbie Reiser										26							22						19		288
66	Bobby Gerhart														26	27			15							285
67	Steve Mendenhall **(R)**								31								24			22	DNQ					277
68	Robby Gordon																				13				6	274
69	Rick McCray		DNQ																			12	32	DNQ		268
70	Jeff Spraker															12			29	DNQ						243
71	Billy Ogle Jr.											DNQ					19			DNQ	DNQ					235
72	Wayne Jacks		17				DNQ															34				234
73	Rodney Combs Jr. **(R)**	13	26																						DNQ	228
74	Terry McCarthy **(R)**	6	33																							214
75	Ted Musgrave																							5	36	210
76	Mike Colabucci									27		28						DNQ							DNQ	208
77	Barry Bodine																			20	23					197
78	Wayne Grubb																	32		18						176
79	Andy Hillenburg																14	36								176
80	Bill Elliott																								2	170
81	Kevin Grubb																	18		35						167
82	Kelly Denton																			36	18					164
83	Michael Waltrip																								4	160
84	Jon Paques																					15		DNQ	DNQ	159
85	Jerry Robertson **(R)**						20																36			158
86	Bobby Hamilton																			**31***	25					158
87	Joe Bessey																		6							150
88	Rick Beebe												22	DNQ												149
89	A. J. Foyt																							33	28	143
90	Marc Robe																					33		DNQ	DNQ	141
91	Mike McLaughlin													9												138
92	Rusty Wallace									9																138
93	Doug Thorpe Jr. **(R)**	DNQ	25																							137
94	Tony Stewart													10												134
95	Bobby Dotter																							20	DNQ	131
96	Bob Strait	31																				DNQ				128
97	Davy Jones							13																		124
98	Ken Bouchard																		16						DNQ	116
99	Ronnie Newman																		26		DNQ					113
100	Danny Hieber														DNQ			DNQ								113
101	Dave Stacy													17												112
102	Ritchie Petty	17																								112
103	G. T. Tallas	DNQ	DNQ																					DNQ	DNQ	106
104	Rodney Combs																				20					103
105	Rick Markle **(R)**	35																			DNQ					101
106	Dorsey Schroeder																					21				100
107	Dan Obrist			22																						97
108	Randy Porter										22															97
109	John Blewett III														22											97
110	Andy Michner																								24	91
111	Gary St. Amant						25																			88
112	Wally Dallenbach Jr.							25																		88
113	Monty Klein															26										85
114	Ernest Winslow																			DNQ	DNQ					80
115	Randy Tolsma																							29	DNQ	77
116	Greg Marlowe																				29					76
117	Mark Mountanos																					30				73
118	Randy MacDonald																				30					73
119	Bill Venturini										31															70
120	Mark Day																31									70
121	Bob Schacht										32															67
122	Curtis Markham																			32						67
123	Casey Atwood																32									67
124	Jimmy Davis								33																	64
125	Perry Tripp									35															DNQ	62
126	Bobby Labonte																							34		61
127	David Green													34												61
128	Mike Wallace													DNQ												58
129	Frank Davis										DNQ															55
130	Brandon Baker																DNQ									55
131	George Kent Jr.																			DNQ						46
132	Randy Churchill	DNQ																								46
133	Chris Trickle																							DNQ	DNQ	44
134	Ron Emmick																							DNQ		34
135	Guy Thomas	DNQ																								25
136	Jason Jarrett																				DNQ					25
137	Steve McEachern																				DNQ					22
138	Cindy Peterson																				DNQ			DNQ		17
139	Brad Means																				DNQ					16
140	Clint Mears																				DNQ					13
141	Doug Adams																							DNQ		13
142	Charles Zahn																				DNQ					4
143	Greg Clark																				DNQ					1
144	Stacy Compton																								DNQ	1
Pos.	Driver	HOM	PHO	POR	EVG	TUS	CNS	HPT	BRI	NZH	MLW	LVL	I70	IRP	FLM	GLN	NSV	RCH	NHA	MAR	NWS	SON	MMR	PHO	LVS	Points
Pos.	Driver	Races																								Points

Key
Color	Result
Gold	Winner
Silver	Finished 2nd–5th
Bronze	Finished 6th–10th
Green	Finished 11th–20th
Blue	Finished 21st or worse
Purple	Did not finish (DNF)
Black	Disqualified (DSQ)
Red	Did not qualify (DNQ)
Tan	Withdrew From Race (Wth)
White	Qualified for another driver (QL)
White	Qualified but replaced due to injury or incident (INQ)
White	Relieved another driver (RL)
Blank	Did not participate (DNP)
Blank	Excluded (EX)
Blank	Did not arrive (DNA)

**Bold** – Pole position awarded by time.
Italics – Pole position earned by points standings or by practice speeds.
* – Most laps led.
^{1} – Post entry, driver and owner did not score points.

== Rookie of the Year ==
Bryan Reffner was named the 1996 Craftsman Truck Series Rookie of the year, winning three poles and finishing ninth in points. He was followed by Doug George, who had eight top-tens over the course of the season, and Lance Norick, who split the season between two different teams. Bobby Gill began the year with Spears Motorsports, but was released. Jay Sauter and Lonnie Cox ran abbreviated schedules for their teams.

== See also ==
- 1996 NASCAR Winston Cup Series
- 1996 NASCAR Busch Series
- 1996 NASCAR Winston West Series
