= Colorado 250 =

NASCAR Craftsman Truck Series
- Venue: Colorado National Speedway
- First race: 1995
- Last race: 1997
- Distance: 75.0 miles (121 km) (1995); 93.8 miles (151 km) (1996-1997)
- Laps: 200 (1995); 250 (1996-1997)
- Previous names: Total Petroleum 200 (1995)

The Colorado 250 was a race held at Colorado National Speedway between 1995 and 1997 as part of the NASCAR Craftsman Truck Series (originally SuperTruck Series presented by Craftsman). The first race, held as part of the series' inaugural season, was sponsored by Total Petroleum as the Total Petroleum 200, and saw the closest margin of victory in the history of the series as Butch Miller defeated Mike Skinner by 0.001 second.

Skinner and Ron Hornaday Jr. would win the 1996 and 1997 events; following the 1997 race, the event was moved to Pikes Peak International Raceway.

== Past winners ==
Year	Date	No.	Driver	Team	Manufacturer	Race distance		Race time	Average speed (mph)	Report	Ref
Year	Date	No.	Driver	Team	Manufacturer	Laps	Miles (km)	Race time	Average speed (mph)	Report	Ref
1995	July 15	98	Butch Miller	Liberty Racing	Ford	200	75 (120.700)	1:20:14	56.086	Report	
1996	June 1	3	Mike Skinner	Richard Childress Racing	Chevrolet	253*	94.875 (152.686)	1:38:29	57.802	Report	
1997	July 19	16	Ron Hornaday Jr.	Dale Earnhardt, Inc.	Chevrolet	250	93.75 (150.876)	1:29:19	62.978	Report	

=== Notes ===
- 1996: Race extended due to a NASCAR Overtime finish.
