= IROC XV =

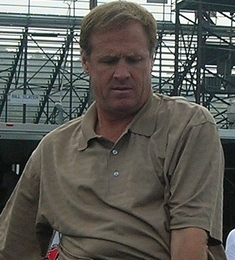
Rusty Wallace (seen in 2006), the IROC XV champion

IROC XV was the fifteenth year of IROC competition, which took place in 1991. It was the second year the Dodge Daytona was used in competition, and continued the format introduced in IROC VIII. Race one took place on the Daytona International Speedway, race two took place at Talladega Superspeedway, race three ran at Michigan International Speedway, and the year finished at Watkins Glen International. Rusty Wallace won the series championship and $175,000.

The roster of drivers and final points standings were as follows:

Rank	Driver	Points	Winnings	Series
1	(United States) Rusty Wallace	86	$175,000	NASCAR Winston Cup
2	(United States) Bill Elliott	64	$65,000	NASCAR Winston Cup
3	(United States) Mark Martin	56	$55,000	NASCAR Winston Cup
4	(United States) Scott Pruett	51	$50,000	IndyCar
5	(United States) Al Unser Jr.	47	$45,000	IndyCar
6	(United States) Al Unser	37	$40,000	IndyCar
7	(Australia) Geoff Brabham	30	$40,000	IMSA Camel GT
8	(United States) Geoff Bodine	29	$40,000	NASCAR Winston Cup
9	(United States) Dale Earnhardt	27	$40,000	NASCAR Winston Cup; Defending IROC Champion
10	(France) Bob Wollek	25	$40,000	WSPC
11	(United States) Tom Kendall^{1}	24	$40,000	IMSA Camel GT
12	(United States) Dorsey Schroeder	16	$40,000	IMSA Camel GT

== Race results ==
=== Race One, Daytona International Speedway ===
Friday, February 15, 1991

Finish	Grid	Car no.	Driver	Car Make	Car Color	Laps	Status	Laps Led	Points
1	5	5	(United States) Scott Pruett	Dodge Daytona	Black	40	0:32:31	14	26*
2	7	7	(United States) Bill Elliott	Dodge Daytona	Red	40	Running	4	17
3	11	11	(United States) Al Unser	Dodge Daytona	Light Blue	40	Running		14
4	6	6	(United States) Al Unser Jr.	Dodge Daytona	Gold	40	Running	5	14***
5	3	3	(United States) Tommy Kendall	Dodge Daytona	Powder Blue	40	Running		10
6	9	9	(United States) Geoff Bodine	Dodge Daytona	Yellow	40	Running		9
7	10	10	(United States) Mark Martin	Dodge Daytona	Rose	40	Running	4	8
8	1	1	(Australia) Geoff Brabham	Dodge Daytona	Dark Blue	40	Running		7
9	8	8	(United States) Dorsey Schroeder	Dodge Daytona	Pink	40	Running		6
10	12	12	(United States) Rusty Wallace	Dodge Daytona	Lime	40	Running	9	**8
11	4	4	(France) Bob Wollek	Dodge Daytona	Tan	37	Crash		4
12	2	2	(United States) Dale Earnhardt	Dodge Daytona	Orange	13	Crash	4	3

one *: Bonus points for leading the most laps.
two **: Bonus points for leading the 2nd most laps.
three ***: Bonus points for leading the 3rd most laps.

Average speed: 184.521 mph
Cautions: 2
Margin of victory: 1 cl
Lead changes: 14

=== Race Two, Talladega Superspeedway ===
Saturday, May 4, 1991

Finish	Grid	Car no.	Driver	Car Make	Car Color	Laps	Status	Laps Led	Points
1	3	10	(United States) Rusty Wallace	Dodge Daytona	Orange	38	0:32:16	25	26*
2	11	2	(United States) Bill Elliott	Dodge Daytona	Yellow	38	Running	4	20**
3	6	7	(United States) Mark Martin	Dodge Daytona	Black	38	Running	4	17**
4	12	1	(United States) Scott Pruett	Dodge Daytona	Blue	38	Running	1	12
5	5	8	(Australia) Geoff Brabham	Dodge Daytona	Red	38	Running		10
6	10	3	(United States) Al Unser	Dodge Daytona	Tan	38	Running		9
7	8	5	(United States) Tom Kendall	Dodge Daytona	Dark Blue	38	Running	2	8
8	2	11	(France) Bob Wollek	Dodge Daytona	Rust	37	Running		7
9	1	12	(United States) Dale Earnhardt	Dodge Daytona	Lime	36	Running	2	6
10	9	4	(United States) Al Unser Jr.	Dodge Daytona	Pink	5	Crash		5
11	4	9	(United States) Dorsey Schroeder	Dodge Daytona	Rose	4	Crash		5
12	7	6	(United States) Geoff Bodine	Dodge Daytona	Gold	3	Crash		3

one *: Bonus points for leading the most laps.
two **: Bonus points for leading the 2nd most laps.
three ***: Bonus points for leading the 3rd most laps (since there was a tie for 2nd both drivers received 2nd most laps led bonus points).

Average speed: 187.958 mph
Cautions: 2
Margin of victory: 1 cl
Lead changes: 9

Cautions

From Lap	To Lap	Reason
4	4	Bill Elliott & Geoff Bodine crash on the backstretch
6	6	Al Unser Jr, Dorsey Schroeder & Dale Earnhardt crash on the backstretch

Lap Leader Breakdown

Driver	From Lap	To Lap	Number of Laps
Rusty Wallace	1	2	2
Dale Earnhardt	3	4	2
Rusty Wallace	5	5	1
Scott Pruett	6	6	1
Mark Martin	7	10	4
Bill Elliott	11	14	4
Rusty Wallace	15	18	4
Tom Kendall	19	20	2
Rusty Wallace	21	38	18

=== Race Three, Michigan International Speedway ===
Saturday, August 3, 1991

Finish	Grid	Car no.	Driver	Car Make	Car Color	Laps	Status	Laps Led	Points
1	9	3	(United States) Rusty Wallace	Dodge Daytona	White	50	0:37:48	37	26*
2	10	2	(United States) Bill Elliott	Dodge Daytona	Lime	50	Running	2	17
3	6	6	(United States) Al Unser Jr.	Dodge Daytona	Orange	50	Running	2	14
4	8	4	(United States) Mark Martin	Dodge Daytona	Dark Red	50	Running	4	15**
5	4	9	(United States) Geoff Bodine	Dodge Daytona	Black	50	Running	4	13**
6	11	1	(United States) Scott Pruett	Dodge Daytona	Purple	50	Running		9
7	7	5	(United States) Al Unser	Dodge Daytona	Red	50	Running		8
8	3	10	(France) Bob Wollek	Dodge Daytona	Yellow	50	Running		7
9	1	12	(United States) Dale Earnhardt	Dodge Daytona	Gold	50	Running	1	6
10	5	8	(Australia) Geoff Brabham	Dodge Daytona	Light Blue	50	Running		5
11	2	11	(United States) Dorsey Schroeder	Dodge Daytona	Silver	50	Running		4
12	12	7	(United States) Tommy Kendall ^{1}	Dodge Daytona	Blue	0	Did Not Start, Injured		3

one *: Bonus points for leading the most laps.
two **: Bonus points for leading the 2nd most laps.
three ***: Bonus points for leading the 3rd most laps (since there was a tie for 2nd both drivers received 2nd most laps led bonus points).

Average speed: 158.744 mph
Cautions: none
Margin of victory: .2 sec
Lead changes: 6

=== Race Four, Watkins Glen International ===
Saturday, August 10, 1991

Finish	Grid	Car no.	Driver	Car Make	Car Color	Laps	Status	Laps Led	Points
1	1	1	(United States) Rusty Wallace	Dodge Daytona	Pink	30	0:39:12	30	26*
2	4	4	(United States) Mark Martin	Dodge Daytona	Dark Red	30	Running		17
3	11	9	(United States) Al Unser Jr. ^{2}	Dodge Daytona	Primary: Yellow; Backup: Powder Blue	30	Running		14
4	9	11	(United States) Dale Earnhardt	Dodge Daytona	Blue	30	Running		12
5	2	2	(United States) Bill Elliott	Dodge Daytona	Black	30	Running		10
6	10	12	(United States) Dorsey Schroeder	Dodge Daytona	Red	30	Running		9
7	7	8	(Australia) Geoff Brabham	Dodge Daytona	Cream	30	Running		8
8	8	10	(France) Bob Wollek	Dodge Daytona	Dark Blue	30	Running		7
9	5	6	(United States) Al Unser	Dodge Daytona	Gold	30	Running		6
10	6	7	(United States) Geoff Bodine	Dodge Daytona	Light Blue	30	Running		5
11	3	3	(United States) Scott Pruett	Dodge Daytona	Lime	20	Mechanical		4
12	12	9	(United States) Tommy Kendall ^{1}	Dodge Daytona	Powder Blue	0	Did Not Start, Injured		3

one *: Bonus points for leading the most laps.
two **: Bonus points for leading the 2nd most laps (did not occur in this race so not awarded).
three ***: Bonus points for leading the 3rd most laps (did not occur in this race so not awarded).

Average speed: 111.49 mph
Cautions: 1 (Lap 1 for Al Unser Jr Crash)
Margin of victory: .15 sec
Lead changes: 0

== Notes ==
1. Tom Kendall did not start the last two races due to injury, and was awarded last place points.
2. Al Unser Jr. started in a backup car from 11th position after a first lap accident.
3. This was also the last time a road course was used in IROC competition until the final edition in 2006.
