= IROC XIV =

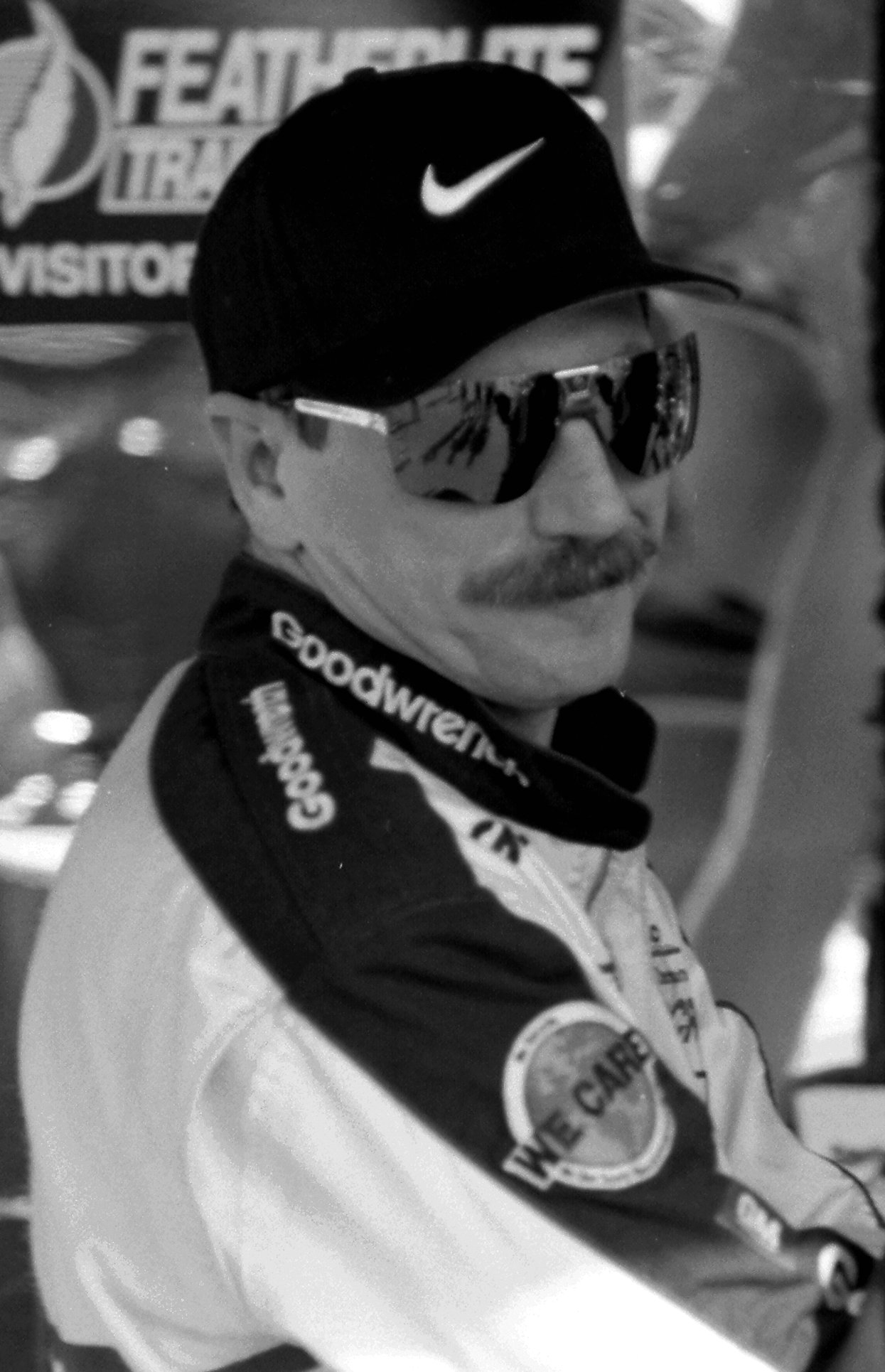
Dale Earnhardt (seen in 2000), the IROC XIV champion

IROC XIV was the fourteenth year of the International Race of Champions auto racing competition. It took place in 1990 and was the first year the Dodge Daytona was used in competition, and continued the format introduced in IROC VIII. Due to not getting enough test time for the new cars, the originally scheduled opener at Daytona International Speedway was canceled. Race one took place on the Talladega Superspeedway, race two took place at Burke Lakefront Airport, and race three ran at Michigan International Speedway. Dale Earnhardt won the series championship, his first of four, and won $175,000.

== Roster and total points ==
The roster of drivers and final points standings were as follows:

Position	Driver	Points	Winnings	Series
1	(United States) Dale Earnhardt	60	$175,000	NASCAR Winston Cup Series; 2nd in 1989 Winston Cup points
2	(United States) Al Unser Jr.	44	$65,000	CART PPG IndyCar World Series; 5th in 1989 Indycar points
3	(United Kingdom) Martin Brundle	41	$50,000	1989: FIA Formula One World Championship; 1990: World Endurance Championship
4	(United States) Mark Martin	37	$45,000	NASCAR Winston Cup Series; 3rd in 1989 Winston Cup points 1989 24 Hours of Daytona GTO winner
5	(United States) Terry Labonte	36	$40,000	NASCAR Winston Cup Series; Defending IROC Champion
6	(Brazil) Emerson Fittipaldi	29	$38,000	CART PPG IndyCar World Series; 1989 Indianapolis 500 winner 1989 IndyCar Champion; 2 Time FIA Formula One World Champion
7	(United States) Dorsey Schroeder ^{1}	26	$35,000	SCCA Trans-Am Series; 1989 Trans-Am Champion; 1989 12 Hours of Sebring GTO winner
8	(United States) Rusty Wallace ^{1}	26	$34,000	NASCAR Winston Cup Series; 1989 Winston Cup champion 1989 NASCAR All Star Race winner
9	(United States) Darrell Waltrip	23	$33,000	NASCAR Winston Cup Series; 4th in 1989 Winston Cup points 1989 Daytona 500 winner
10	(United States) Bobby Rahal ^{2}	18	$32,000	CART PPG IndyCar World Series; 9th in 1989 IndyCar points
11	(Australia) Geoff Brabham ^{2}	18	$31,000	IMSA Camel GTP; 1989 GTP Champion; 1989 24 Hours of Daytona GTP winner 1989 12 Hours of Sebring GTP winner
12	(United States) Danny Sullivan	13	$30,000	CART PPG IndyCar World Series; 7th in 1989 IndyCar points

== Individual race results ==
In all races, all drivers utilized identically prepared Dodge Daytona's with Goodyear tires

=== Race One, Talladega Superspeedway ===
Saturday, May 5, 1990

Finish	Grid	Car no.	Driver	Car Color	Laps	Status	Laps Led	Points	
1	9	9	(United States) Dale Earnhardt	Silver	38	0:32:15	10	24 (3)	
2	8	8	(United States) Al Unser Jr.	Blue	38	Running	5	17	
3	2	2	(United States) Mark Martin	Yellow	38	Running	5	14	
4	11	11	(United States) Darrell Waltrip	Red	38	Running	11	17 (5)	
5	10	10	(United Kingdom) Martin Brundle	Mustard	38	Running		10	
6	4	4	(United States) Dorsey Schroeder	Dark Blue	38	Running		9	
7	5	5	(United States) Rusty Wallace	Rose	38	Running	7	10 (2)	
8	12	12	(United States) Terry Labonte	Orange	38	Running		7	
9	7	7	(Australia) Geoff Brabham	Dodge Daytona	Black	38	Running		6
10	6	6	(Brazil) Emerson Fittipaldi	Teal	38	Running		5	
11	1	1	(United States) Bobby Rahal	Pink	38	Running		4	
12	3	3	(United States) Danny Sullivan	Lime	37	Running		3	

(5) Indicates 5 bonus points added to normal race points scored for leading the most laps.
(3) Indicates 3 bonus points added to normal race points scored for leading the 2nd most laps
(2) Indicates 2 bonus points added to normal race points scored for leading the 3rd most laps.

Average speed: 188.055 mph
Cautions: none
Margin of victory: 1 cl
Lead changes: 15

=== Race Two, Burke Lakefront Airport ===
Saturday, July 7, 1990

Finish	Grid	Car no.	Driver	Car Color	Laps	Status	Laps Led	Points
1	8	5	(United Kingdom) Martin Brundle	Lime	30	0:42:01	19	26 (5)
2	10	2	(United States) Al Unser Jr.	Orange	30	Running		17
3	3	10	(Brazil) Emerson Fittipaldi	Black	30	Running	11	17 (3)
4	5	8	(United States) Terry Labonte	Red	30	Running		12
5	11	1	(United States) Dale Earnhardt	Blue	30	Running		10
6	9	4	(United States) Mark Martin	Gold	30	Running		9
7	4	9	(Australia) Geoff Brabham	Light Blue	30	Running		8
8	6	6	(United States) Rusty Wallace	Cream	30	Running		7
9	2	11	(United States) Bobby Rahal	Yellow	29	Running		6
10	7	7	(United States) Dorsey Schroeder	Silver	21	Crash		5
11	1	12	(United States) Danny Sullivan	Rose	12	Mechanical		4
12	X	3	(United States) Darrell Waltrip ^{3}	Not assigned	0	Did Not Start, Injured		3

(5) Indicates 5 bonus points added to normal race points scored for leading the most laps.
(3) Indicates 3 bonus points added to normal race points scored for leading the 2nd most laps
(2) Normally indicates 2 bonus points added to normal race points scored for leading the 3rd most laps but since that did not occur in this race it was not awarded.

Average speed: 101.469 mph
Cautions: none
Margin of victory: 4 sec
Lead changes: 2

=== Race Three, Michigan International Speedway ===
Saturday, August 5, 1990

Finish	Grid	Car no.	Driver	Car Color	Laps	Status	Laps Led	Points
1	3	3	(United States) Dale Earnhardt	Orange	50	0:39:08	50	26 (5)
2	5	7	(United States) Terry Labonte	Light Blue	50	Running		17
3	7	4	(United States) Mark Martin	Dark Blue	50	Running		14
4	9	10	(United States) Dorsey Schroeder	Rose	50	Running		12
5	2	2	(United States) Al Unser Jr.	Cream	50	Running		10
6	6	8	(United States) Rusty Wallace	Yellow	50	Running		9
7	10	11	(United States) Bobby Rahal	Red	50	Running		8
8	4	5	(Brazil) Emerson Fittipaldi	Dark Red	50	Running		7
9	11	12	(United States) Danny Sullivan	Pink	50	Running		6
10	1	1	(United Kingdom) Martin Brundle	Black	49	Running		5
11	8	9	(Australia) Geoff Brabham	Gold	8	Mechanical		4
12	X	6	(United States) Darrell Waltrip ^{3}	Not assigned	0	Did Not Start, Injured		3

(5) Indicates 5 bonus points added to normal race points scored for leading the most laps.
(3) Normally indicates 3 bonus points added to normal race points scored for leading the 2nd most laps but since it did not occur in this race it was not awarded.
(2) Normally indicates 2 bonus points added to normal race points scored for leading the 3rd most laps but since it did not occur in this race it was not awarded.

Average speed: 153.316 mph
Cautions: 1
Margin of victory: .08 sec
Lead changes: 0

== Notes ==
1. Dorsey Schroeder and Rusty Wallace tied for seventh place in the championship standings, but Schroeder was awarded the position due to a higher finishing position in the final race.
2. Bobby Rahal and Geoff Brabham tied for tenth place in the championship standings, but Rahal was awarded the position due to a higher finishing position in the final race.
3. Darrell Waltrip did not start the final two races due to injury.
