= Rusty Wallace =

American racing driver (born 1956)

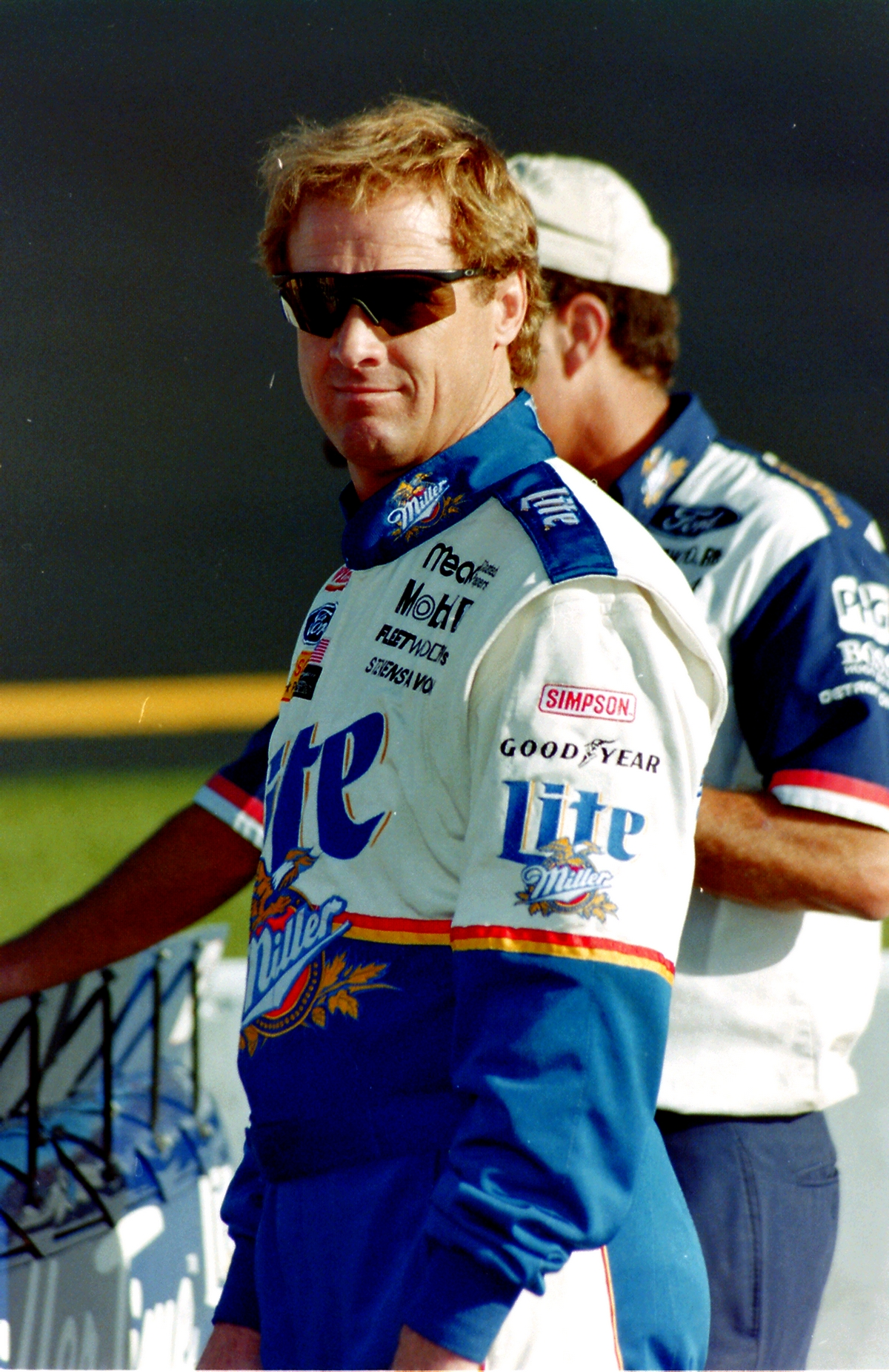
- Wallace in 1997
- Born: Russell William Wallace Jr. August 14, 1956 (age 70); Arnold, Missouri, U.S.
- Achievements: 1989 Winston Cup Series Champion; 1991 IROC Champion; 1983 ASA Champion; 1990 Coca-Cola 600 Winner; 1989 The Winston Winner; 1998 Bud Shootout Winner; 1996 NASCAR Thunder Special Suzuka Winner; 1982 Winchester 400 Winner; 1985 All American 400 Winner; Led Winston Cup Series in wins (1988, 1989, 1993, 1994); Led Winston Cup Series in poles (2000); 1988 Final Winner at Riverside International Raceway; 1993 Inaugural Winner at New Hampshire Motor Speedway; 9 wins at Bristol Motor Speedway (including record 6 Food City 500 wins and a sweep in 2000); 7 wins at Martinsville Speedway (including record 4 consecutive Spring race wins from 1993 to 1996 and a sweep in 1994); 6 wins at Richmond International Raceway (all time record on current .75 mile configuration); All time lap leader in modern era at Bristol Motor Speedway; All time lap leader in modern era at Richmond International Raceway (all time lap leader on current .75 mile configuration); All time winner for Pontiac (31 victories) in NASCAR history
- Awards: NASCAR Hall of Fame (2013); International Motorsports Hall of Fame (2013); National Motorsports Press Association Hall of Fame (2010); Motorsports Hall of Fame of America (2014); Missouri Sports Hall of Fame (1998); Named a Missouri Sports Legend by the Missouri Sports Hall of Fame (2006); St. Louis Sports Hall of Fame (2011); NMPA Myers Brothers Award winner (2005); 2× NMPA Richard Petty Driver of the Year (1988, 1993); NASCAR Illustrated Person of the Year (2005); North Carolina's Order of the Long Leaf Pine (2005); Delaware's Order of the First State (2005); Named one of NASCAR's 50 Greatest Drivers (1998); AARWBA All-American Teams 1988, 1989, 1993; 1984 Winston Cup Series Rookie of the Year; 1980 USAC Tony Bettenhausen Memorial Trophy; 1979 USAC Stock Car Rookie of the Year; 1973 Central Racing Association Rookie of the Year; Named one of NASCAR's 75 Greatest Drivers (2023); 2023 Buddy Shuman Award recipient

NASCAR Cup Series career
- 706 races run over 25 years
- 2005 position: 8th
- Best finish: 1st (1989)
- First race: 1980 Atlanta 500 (Atlanta)
- Last race: 2005 Ford 400 (Homestead)
- First win: 1986 Valleydale 500 (Bristol)
- Last win: 2004 Advance Auto Parts 500 (Martinsville)
Wins	Top tens	Poles
55	349	36

NASCAR O'Reilly Auto Parts Series career
- 42 races run over 9 years
- 2005 position: 61st
- Best finish: 32nd (1987)
- First race: 1985 Goody's 300 (Daytona)
- Last race: 2005 O'Reilly Challenge (Texas)
Wins	Top tens	Poles
0	18	2

NASCAR FedEx Freight Truck Series career
- 1 race run over 1 year
- 1996 position: 92nd
- Best finish: 92nd (1996)
- First race: 1996 DeVilbiss Superfinish 200 (Nazareth)
Wins	Top tens	Poles
0	1	0
- Statistics up to date as of December 21, 2012.

Russell William Wallace Jr. (born August 14, 1956) is an American former professional stock car racing driver and team owner, who raced from 1980 to 2005 in the former NASCAR Winston Cup Series (now called the NASCAR Cup Series), most notably driving the No. 2 nicknamed "Midnight" for Penske Racing.

Prior to stock car racing, Wallace had an extremely successful career in short track and late model racing, winning over 200 races and two track championships in Florida.

Wallace won the American Speed Association championship in 1983 before joining the NASCAR Cup series full time in 1984 where he won Rookie of the Year and the later won the 1989 NASCAR Winston Cup Championship and the International Race of Champions in 1991. Wallace won the 1990 Coca-Cola 600 and claimed 55 total wins throughout his NASCAR career. He is often considered among the best short track drivers in NASCAR history with 25 of his 55 career victories coming at short tracks. He won a career best nine races at Bristol Motor Speedway. Wallace also won an additional three exhibition (non-points) races in his career, including the 1989 Winston All-Star Race and the inaugural NASCAR race in Japan at Suzuka Circuit.

For the accolades over the course of his successful career, Wallace has been inducted into the three main motorsports halls of fame including the NASCAR Hall of Fame (2013), the International Motorsports Hall of Fame (2013), the Motorsports Hall of Fame of America (2014) and additionally the National Motorsports Press Association Hall of Fame (2010). He was named as one of the NASCAR's 50 Greatest Drivers class in 1998, and one of 75 Greatest Drivers in 2023.

Since retirement, Wallace has transitioned into a commentator role for NASCAR events; he also designed Iowa Speedway and operated his own racing team called Rusty Wallace Racing.

== Early life ==
Russell William Wallace Jr. was born on August 14, 1956, to his parents Russ Sr. and Judy Wallace. He was the oldest of 3 brothers Mike and Kenny. He grew up in Arnold, Missouri just outside of St. Louis and attended Fox High School.

Wallace's father was also a prolific race winner himself, Wallace and his two brothers grew up around the race track and would often serve as a member of their father's pit crew.

== Racing career ==
=== Early career and short track racing ===
Due to his father's background Wallace wanted to race from an early age however after obtaining his driver's license, he technically wasn't old enough to compete. His mother then had to go to court and get permission for him to race. He then won his debut heat race at Lake Hill Speedway in Valley Park.

Prior to joining the NASCAR circuit, Wallace made a name for himself racing around in Florida, winning a pair of local track championships, and won the Central Racing Association Rookie of the Year award in 1973. He went on to become one of the most successful drivers in the Midwest from 1974 to 1978, winning more than 200 races. Then In 1979, he won the United States Auto Club's (USAC) Stock Car Rookie of the Year honors, finishing third in points behind A. J. Foyt and Bay Darnell with two wins and eight top-tens. In 1981, he finished second in the USAC Stock Cars championship standings, behind Joe Ruttman with two wins and nine ton-tens

In 1980, Wallace got his first break making his NASCAR debut on March 16, 1980, at Atlanta, driving the No. 16 Chevrolet for Roger Penske. The then 23 year old Wallace started seventh in his first Grand National race and he earned a surprising second-place finish behind Dale Earnhardt. Wallace would race one more time during the 1980 Winston Cup season, where he would claim a 14th-place finish at the National 500 on October 5.

Wallace would continue to race sporadically in the Winston during the 1981 and 1982 seasons. His best finish during this period came at the National 500 on October 11, 1981, where he finished in 6th place. On October 3, 1982, Wallace won the prestigious short track race the Winchester 400 after leading 75 laps. Wallace later won another short track crown jewel race in 1985 at the All American 400, leading for 225 laps.

By 1983 it was clear that Wallace was one of the more talented young racers in the sport; however, the one thing he was lacking was a major short track championship, which would help him get a full-time major-team NASCAR opportunity. And so, in 1983, Wallace finally raced a full American Speed Association schedule. He had competed most of the tour the previous two years and ended the 1981 season with the Winchester 400, but due to missing a few races it had kept him out of championship contention both years. Throughout the season Wallace ultimately emerged on top. Over the opening seven races, he paced the field for 477 laps, though frequent mechanical issues kept knocking him out of contention. He then hit a strong midseason stretch followed, with five top-five finishes in six races, putting him back in championship contention. He officially moved into the lead after finishing fifth at Coeburn in August. The fall portion of his season featured a standout victory at Michigan International Speedway, giving him his second ASA win on a NASCAR superspeedway along with enough top-ten results to hold off his competitors. All Wallace had to do to secure the championship was just have a decent finish at the final race in Nashville, which he was able to do. Winning the 1983 ASA championship while beating out future NASCAR stars such as Mark Martin, Alan Kulwicki, and Dick Trickle.

=== Start of NASCAR career 1984-1985 ===
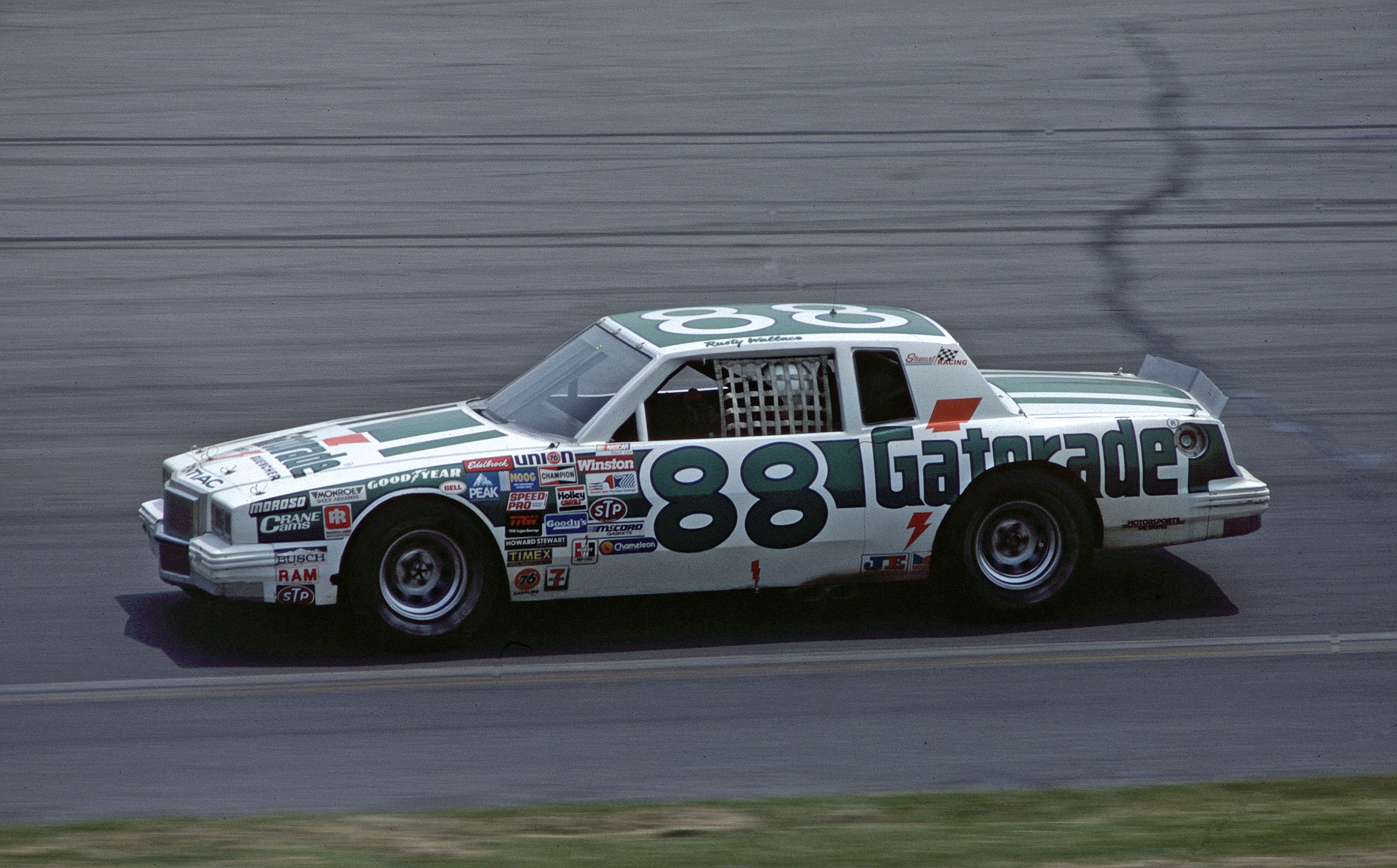
Wallace in his No. 88 car during his rookie year in 1984

In 1984, following his ASA championship Wallace officially joined the Winston Cup circuit full-time. He drove the No. 88 Gatorade Pontiac for Cliff Stewart. His best race that year was a 4th-place finish at Darlington Raceway, along with two fifth-place finishes and four further top-tens. These performances resulted in Wallace winning NASCAR Rookie of the Year honors and finishing 14th in the final points standings.

Wallace stayed with Cliff Stewart for 1985 but this time, he drove the No. 2 Alugard Pontiac. He started the year with a top-ten finish at the Daytona 500, On April 26, he claimed a fifth-place finish at Bristol after leading for 28 laps, he secured another fifth-place finish the following race at Darlington on April 14. In 29 total races, Wallace had two top-fives and eight top-tens finishing the year in 19th-place.

=== 1986 season and switch to Blue Max Racing ===
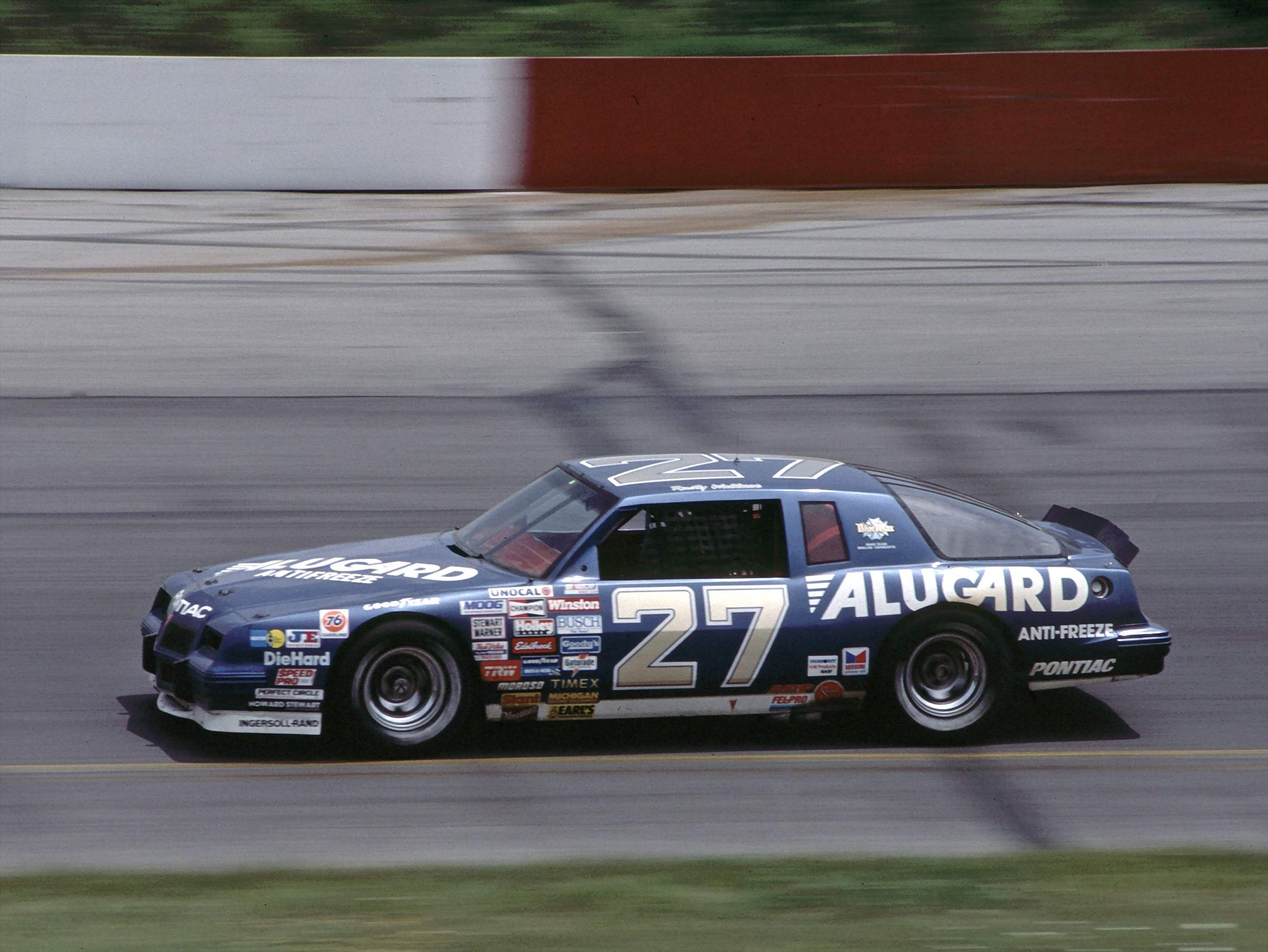
Rusty Wallace at Pocono 1986

In 1986, Wallace switched teams to the No. 27 Alugard Pontiac for Raymond Beadle's Blue Max Racing team. Wallace started out the year strong with four top-ten finishes and one top-five finish in his first six races. He then won his first NASCAR race at Bristol Motor Speedway on April 6, 1986. During the back half of the season he picked up a fourth-place finish at Riverside on June 1. He also won his second win at Martinsville on September 21, and finished fourth once again at North Wilkesboro the following week on September 28.

By the end of the year, Wallace had finished the year with two wins, four top-fives, and sixteen top-tens in 29 total races. These results landed him a sixth-place finish in the points, notching this his first top-ten finish in the standings in just his third year.

=== 1987 season ===
In 1987, Wallace gained sponsorship from Kodiak tobacco, establishing the No. 27 Kodiak Pontiac livery his early career is most remembered for. Wallace started off the year with back to back third-place finishes at Richmond and Atlanta. On April 26, Wallace finished in second place to Dale Earnhardt at Martinsville. On June 28, Wallace claimed his first series pole at Michigan with a 42.168 time, he ended up finishing the race in fifth place. On August 10, Wallace won his first race of the season at Watkins Glen International, he followed this up with a fourth-place finish at Michigan on August 16. On August 22, Wallace once again finished in second place behind Earnhardt at Bristol, Wallace would once again finish in second to Earnhardt for the a third time the following race on September 6, at Darlington. Wallace would pick up his second victory of the season on the second two last race of the year at Riverside after a misfortune caused by an aggressive battle for the lead in the closing laps between Dale Earnhardt and Geoff Bodine, resulting in Wallace being able to pull ahead.

By the end of the year, Wallace had accumulated two wins, nine top-fives, and sixteen top-tens in 29 races. He finished 5th in the final points standings.

=== 1988 season ===
Wallace started off the 1988 season with a seventh-place finish at the Daytona 500 and Richmond on February 14, and the 21st respectively. Just like last season Wallace finished in second place behind Earnhardt at Atlanta on March 20. finished with back to back fourth-place finishes on Bristol and North Wilkesboro on April 10 and 17. On May 29, Wallace once again finished in second at Charlotte Motor Speedway with Darrell Waltrip taking first. On June 12, Wallace would get his first win of the season at the final race ever run at Riverside as he pulled away during the final restart. Just two races later on June 26, Wallace would claim his second win of the year at Michigan beating out Bill Elliott as he led the final 29 laps of the race.

Wallace picked up back to back second-place finishes Watkins Glen and at Michigan at on August 14 and 21, respectively. Then during a practice session at Bristol the following week on August 27, Wallace's car lost control and slammed on the turn 4 wall before barrel rolling five times on the straightaway. It took rescue officials - including Jerry Punch - 15 minutes to extract him from the wrecked car. According to Wallace, he nearly choked to death from a ham sandwich he ate before practice. He ended up fishing in ninth-place during the race the following day. On September 4, Wallace once again finished in second place to Elliott at Darlington Raceway. Wallace won his first pole of the season at Martinsville on September 25. On October 9, Wallace secured his third win of the season at Charlotte Motor Speedway after coming back from a two lap deficit and fending off Darrell Waltrip. The following week on October 16, Wallace was able to notch another victory at North Wilkesboro, on the final lap of the race, Geoff Bodine moved Wallace up the track in the first turn, giving Bodine the lead. However, heading into the final turns, Wallace was close enough to be able to bump Bodine back, eventually deciding to send him up the track, giving Wallace the victory. He then won his third race in a row on October 23, at North, Carolina Speedway once again coming back from a two lap deficit and proceeding to dominate the second half of the race.

Wallace would end the season by claiming his second pole of the year and winning his sixth race at Atlanta. Despite the strong performance, Wallace's victory was still not enough to win the Winston Cup as Bill Elliott was able to secure the title with an 11th-place finish resulting in Wallace finishing in second place, 24 points behind Elliott.

=== Winston Cup Victory 1989 season ===
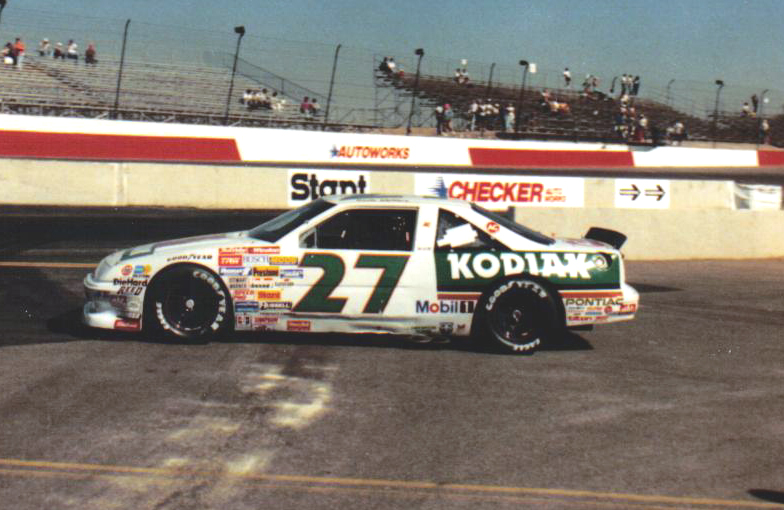
1989 car at Phoenix with Kodiak paint scheme

Coming off a strong season the year prior Wallace scored an early pole and victory at the start of the 1989 season on March 5, at North Carolina beating out Alan Kulwicki. Two races later on March 26, Wallace picked up his second win of the year at Richmond following the assist of a late caution and a fast final pitstop, Wallace would pull away from the field on the final restart with 17 laps left. On April 9, Wallace was able to secure his first ever victory at Bristol and his third of the year managing to make a late race charge to the lead, passing for the lead with 43 laps left in the race. Wallace claimed his second pole of the year on April 16, at North Wilkesboro. On May 21, Wallace won The Winston in a controversial fashion, by spinning out Darrell Waltrip on the last lap.

On June 11, Wallace won his third pole of the year at Sears Point International Raceway however he would end of finishing in second to Ricky Rudd. His fourth pole came the following week on June 18, at Pocono Raceway. He then finished in second place to Bill Elliott at both Michigan on June 25, and Poconco on July 23. Wallace then got back to his winning ways on August 23, at Watkins Glen holding off Mark Martin to claim his fourth win of the season. Wallace then claimed a second consecutive victory the following week at Michigan on August 20, dominate a majority of the race, leading 162 laps. Wallace's sixth and final win of the year came at Richmond on September 10, with Wallace running the last 129 laps of the race on one tank of fuel finally getting the better of his rival Dale Earnhardt and sweeping Richmond that season. Wallace then began to climb to the top of the standings late in the season with five top-ten finishes in his next five races including a second-place finish at Rockingham on October 22.

Wallace's championship run all came down to the final race of the season on November 19, at Atlanta with Wallace needing an 18th-place finish or better to secure the championship. During the race, he was able to overcome late race issues to claim a 15th-place finish to beat out close friend and fierce rival Dale Earnhardt (the race winner) by twelve points, winning his first and only Winston Cup of his career.

=== 1990 season ===
In 1990, Raymond Beadle switched sponsors, to Miller Genuine Draft. The four-year sponsorship deal was tied specifically to Wallace, meaning it went to whichever team Wallace went. The 1989 championship year was reportedly marked with acrimony between him and Beadle. However, Wallace was stuck with the team for 1990 due to his contract.

Wallace started off the 1990 season with a seventh-place finish at the Daytona 500, then following multiple top-ten finishes, Wallace placed second at Martinsville on April 30, to Geoff Bodine. Wallace then won his first race of the season on May 27, at Charlotte after a dominant performance leading 306 of the 400 laps in the race. His second and final victory of the year came soon after at Sonoma on June 10, which once again came in a dominant finish at the end of the race which he led most of. He came up just short of back to back wins finishing in second place at Ponoco the following week to Harry Gant. Wallace would once again place second on August 25, at Bristol. Wallace would close out the year claiming back to back poles at both Phoenix and Atlanta. He would finish the year in sixth place with two wins, seven top-fives, and six top-tens.

=== Switch to Penske Racing 1991 and 1992 ===
In 1991, Wallace took the Miller sponsorship with him to Penske Racing, and he continued in the No. 2 Miller Genuine Draft Pontiac. On April 14, Wallace won his first race of the season and his third overall at Bristol, after winning the pole Wallace fell behind but was able to overcome a two-lap deficit and hold off Morgan–McClure Motorsports driver Ernie Irvan. His only other victory of the year came at Pocono on July 21, Wallace would manage to conserve enough fuel to run until the last caution flag was given on lap 174. After the red flag was given out on lap 176, a two-hour rain delay would delay the restart. After the rain delay, NASCAR mandated that all drivers start their cars and run behind the pace car until lap 179, where NASCAR would declare the race official, handing Wallace the victory and the 20th of his career. Wallace would win his only pole of the season at Richmond on September 7, he would finish the year in tenth place with two wins, seven top-fives, and five top-tens.

In 1992, Wallace would not get his first top-ten finish until April 12, at Bristol he would then finish in second place to Davey Allison the following race at North Wilkesboro on April 26. Wallace's only victory of the year came at Richmond on September 12, despite this being his only victory it was a satisfying one as it was the first win for Wallace in a car which arguably was his best known chassis for his career, one affectionately known as "Midnight" after the win. With this nickname, the car raced for six seasons, carrying various race wins before being taken out of the fleet in 1997. Later on in the year, he would claim the pole at Phoenix on November 21, Wallace would finish the year outside of the top-ten in 13th with one win, along with seven top-fives and top-tens.

=== 1993 season ===
The 1993 season was arguably his most successful season despite two major accidents at Daytona and Talladega, in which his car went airborne and flipped several times. He won the second race of the season on February 28, 1993, at North Carolina Motor Speedway dominating late stages of the race and leading for 203 laps. He then finished in second place the following race at Richmond. Prior to the first race of the year at Bristol in April, Wallace's friend and reigning NASCAR Champion Alan Kulwicki was killed flying into Bristol. Wallace would then go on to win the pole and the race itself, and during his victory lap he paid respect to Alan Kulwicki, he did a "Polish victory lap"—turning his car around and driving around the track the wrong way, as made famous by Kulwicki. For the rest of the year following every victory Wallace won, he performed a "Kulwicki victory lap. Wallace would carry this momentum and won every race in April including North Wilkesboro on April 18, and Martinsville on April 25.

Wallace's fifth came on July 11, when he became the first person to win at the New Hampshire International Speedway with Wallace pulling away on the final restart with 27 laps remaining. This was followed by a second-place finish at Pocono on July 18, and another one at Bristol on August 28. Wallace would then secure his sixth win of the year on September 11, at Richmond after leading for 206 laps. Wallace would win a second consecutive race the following week at Dover after winning the pole. Wallace would manage to comeback from a one-lap deficit partly caused by a wreck Wallace had caused by hitting back of Hut Stricklin's car, causing a five-car pileup. The following race Wallace would claim another second-place finish at Martinsville, before winning his eighth win of the year at North Wilkesboro on October 3. Later in the month of October 24, Wallace would win his ninth race of the year at Rockingham cutting down Earnhardt's lead to 72 points. Wallace then closed out the season with his tenth win of the year at Atlanta. Even though he won an impressive ten of the 30 races, he still finished second in the final points standings, 80 points behind Earnhardt. He ended the season strong, finishing in the top-three in all but two of the final ten races of the season.

=== 1994 season ===
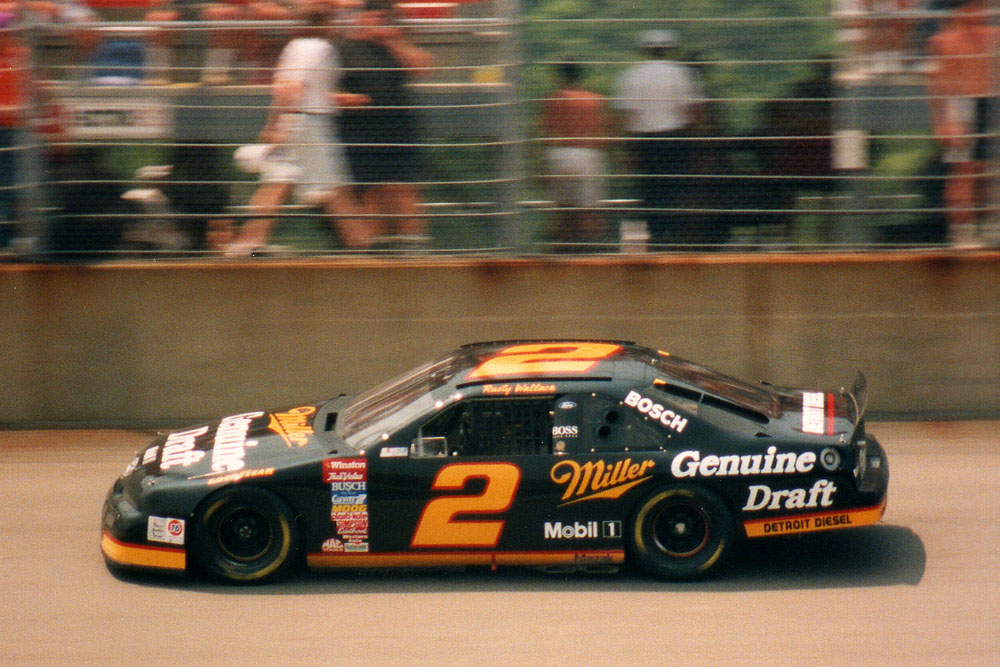
Wallace at Michigan in 1994 with his MGD paint scheme

Penske switched to Fords in 1994. Just like the previous year, Wallace started off the 1994 season by winning the second race of the year at North Carolina Speedway; Wallace dominated a majority of the race leading for 347 laps. He then finished in second place to Ernie Irvan at Richmond on March 6, and picked up another second-place finish on April 17, at North Wilkesboro Speedway. The following race at Martinsville on April 24, saw him win the pole and fend off Irvan to complete a comeback from a speeding penalty midway through the race, retaking the lead on lap 433 to win his second race of the year. The month of June was a successful run for Wallace as he opened it up with a win on Dover June 5, once again holding off Irvan. Then on June 12, Wallace picked up a second straight victory and a pole at Pocono, in a one-lap shootout to the finish Wallace would be able to fend off the rest of the field to complete a dominant race performance after leading 141 laps. He then successfully completed the sweep of June after winning his third in a row at Michigan on the 19, after managing to come back from a slow pit stop, passing the leader with five to go in the race.

Wallace would claim his sixth win of the season on August 27, at Bristol as he fended off Mark Martin during the final 36 laps of the race. He would then win his seventh of the year on September 18, successfully sweeping both Dover races of the season. Running with barely any fuel and a punctured left rear tire, Wallace was able to coast to the finish line, running at 20 miles per hour (32 km/h) under caution. Wallace would also sweep Martinsville winning his eighth and final race on the track the following week on September 25, leading 368 of the 500 laps. Wallace would finish the year in third place with eight victories, seven top-fives, and two top-tens.

=== 1995 season ===
During the 1995 season, Wallace claimed a second-place finish behind Jeff Gordon at Bristol on April 2. Two races later on April 23, Wallace claimed his first victory of the year at Martinsville. He was able to dominate the majority of the race when it was called off at the 356 lap for darkness with delays of the race coming from a rain delay. This marked Wallace's 40th career victory. On August 5, he claimed another second-place finish at Indianapolis falling short of Dale Earnhardt. Wallace won his second and final race of the year at Richmond of September 9, being able to dominate most of the race due to his fast pitting throughout the race. He would claim two more second-place finishes later on in the year at North Wilkesboro on October 1, and Rockingham on October 23, respectively. Wallace would finish the year fifth in the standings, with two wins, thirteen top-fives, and four top-tens.

=== 1996 season ===
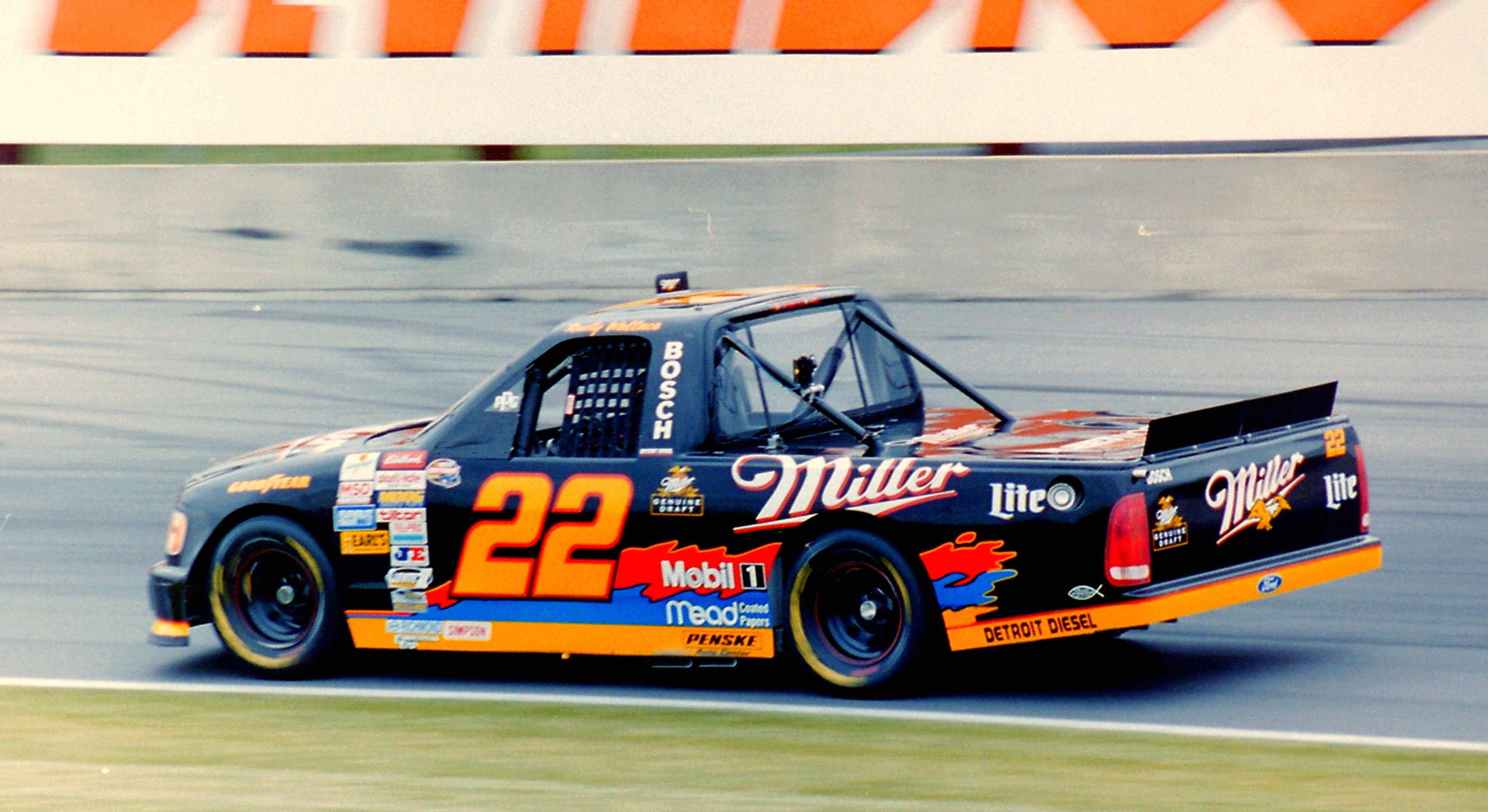
Wallace's only Truck Series start was at Nazareth Speedway in 1996

In 1996, sponsorship changed from Miller Genuine Draft to Miller beer sponsorship. After securing three top-ten/five finishes to start off the 1996 season, Wallace would claim his first win of the year on April 21, at Martinsville after managing to pass Jeff Gordon late in the race to secure the victory. His second win would shortly thereafter on May 5, at Sears Point Raceway with Wallace pulling away late in the race. Wallace would earn his third win of the year at Michigan on June 23. He managed to drive a conservative race for the last 52 laps to take the victory. Just three races later, Wallace would come up victorious for the fourth time that year at on July 21, at Pocono as he pulled away on a late restart during the final 14 laps. Wallace's fifth and final win of the year came on August 24, at Bristol where he led for 353 of the 500 laps. Wallace would end the year inside the top-ten, finishing seventh in points with five wins, three top-fives, and ten top-tens.

At the end of the 1996 season, NASCAR hosted its first of three exhibition races in Japan, the first of two at Suzuka. Wallace was the winner of that first race.

=== End of the decade 1997-1999 ===
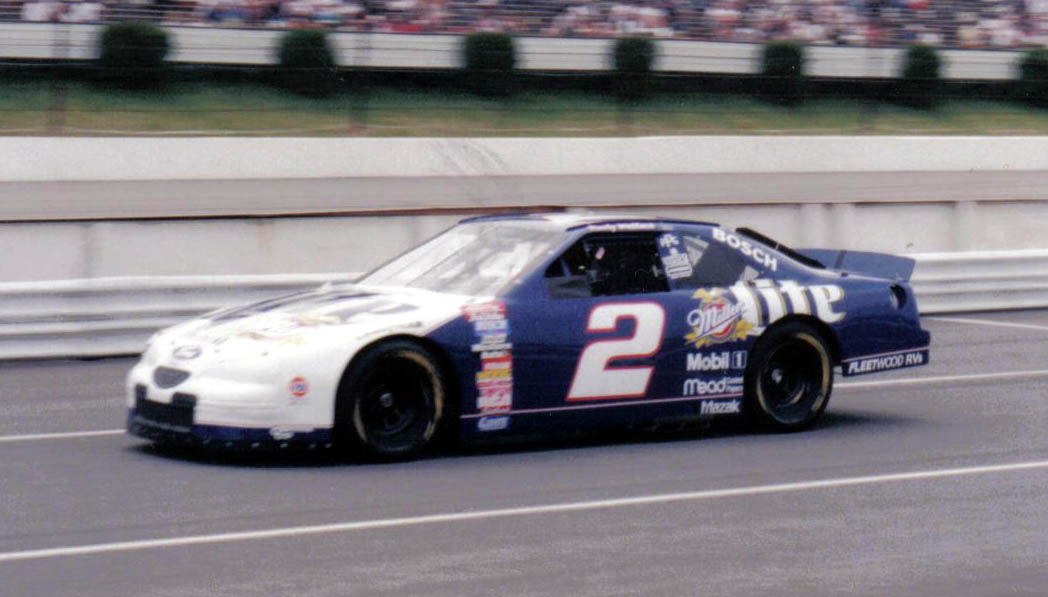
Wallace's 1997 paint scheme

In 1997, Miller changed the team's sponsorship to Miller Lite, replacing the black and gold with a blue and white scheme. Wallace won his first and only race of the 1997 season early in the year on March 2, at Richmond. In post-race technical inspection, Wallace's engine was found to have failed to "meet compression ratio specifications" according to NASCAR technical inspector Kevin Triplett. At the time, the engine compression ratio was 14:1. On Monday, March 3, NASCAR would run another test. The official test results came to 14.001:1, which while slightly over, was within the guidelines and would allow Wallace to keep his victory. On April 13, Wallace would win the pole at Bristol; however, he would end up placing second to Jeff Gordon in the race. Later on in the year, he would claim another 2nd-place finish at Bristol on November 2. Wallace finished the year in ninth place in the standings with one win, six top-fives, and three top-tens.

Wallace at Richmond in 1998.

To start out the 1998 season, Wallace won the Bud Shootout at Daytona, a non-points race for the previous years pole winners and past winners of the race. It was the first win for Ford's new Taurus, and Wallace's second victory at NASCAR's premier track (as well as his only victory in any restrictor plate race) in a Cup car. He would claim a second-place finish at Rockingham on February 22. Throughout the year, Wallace would claim four pole wins two of those came at Bristol on March 29, and August 22 the other two were at Dover on May 31 and Richmond on September 21. His first and only win of the year came late in the season at Phoenix on October 25, the race was stopped after 257 laps due to inclement weather; Wallace led 196 of those laps. Despite winning just one race on the year, Wallace finished the year fourth in the standings with twelve top-fives and six top-tens.

Just like the previous year, Wallace only claimed one victory during the 1999 season which came at Bristol on April 11, Wallace also won the pole and led for 425 of the 500 laps. Wallace won three more poles throughout the season at Watkins Glen on August 15, New Hampshire on September 19 and Dover on September 26. He finished eighth in the standings that year with six top-fives and ten top-tens.

=== 2000 season ===
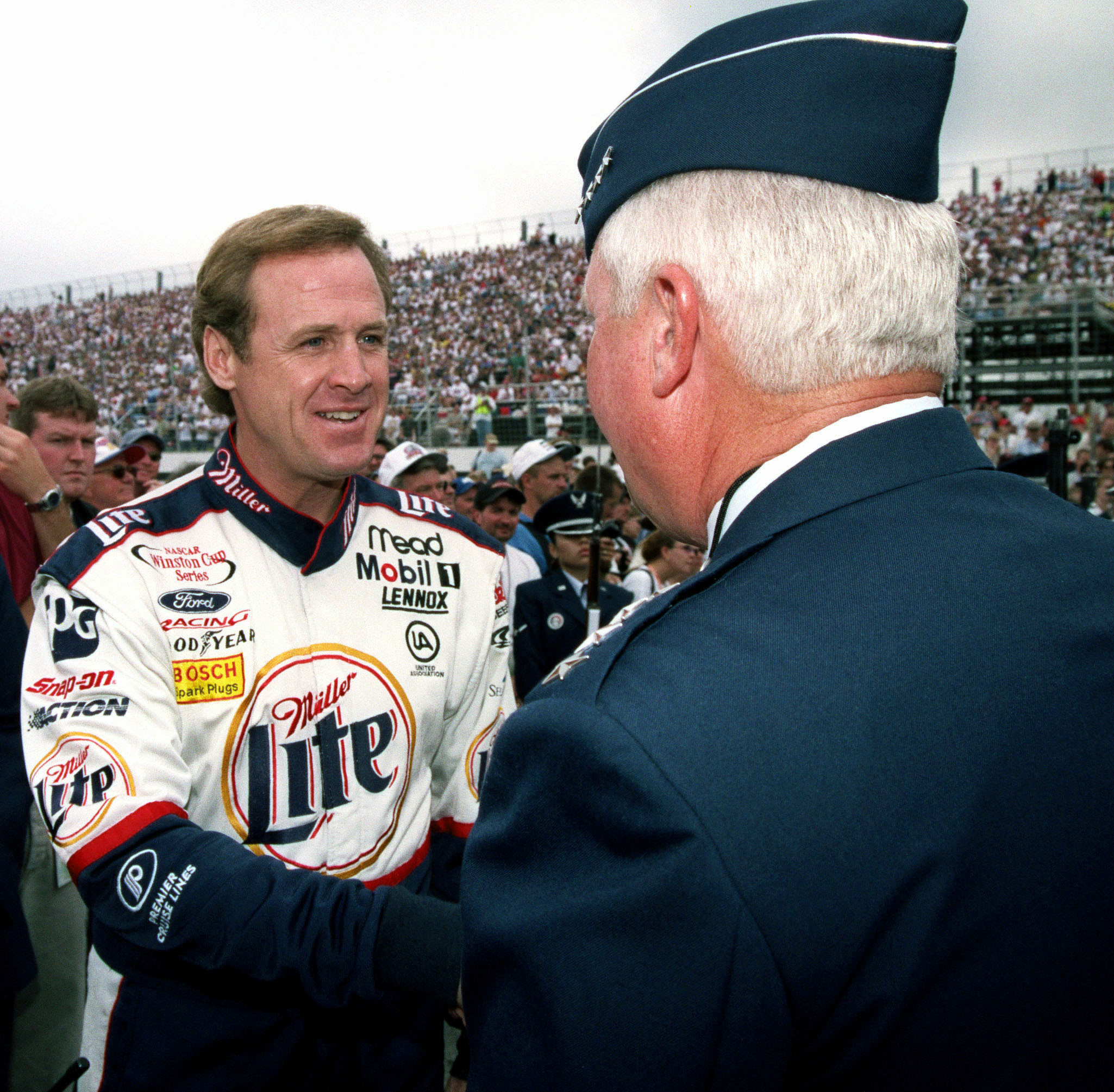
Wallace meeting US Air Force General Hal Hornburg before the start of the MBNA 400 Winston Series race at Dover Downs on September 24, 2000.

Wallace started off the 2000 season with a fourth-place finish at the Daytona 500, he then won the pole at Rockingham the following race on February 27. Wallace won his firs race of the season at Bristol on March 26, this win also secured his 50th career, becoming the tenth driver in NASCAR to win 50+ races. He is also the only driver in NASCAR history to win his first and 50th career victories at the same track, and in the same race. Wallace would claim his second pole of the season at Martinsville on April 9, and his third at Richmond on May 6. His with pole of the season came June 4, at Dover he would then win back to back poles at Pocono and Sonoma on June 19 and 25 respectively, his sixth would later come at New Hampshire on July 9.

After winning a career high six poles Wallace would finally get his second win of the year at Pocono on July 23, with Wallace fending off Jeff Burton on the final lap. Wallace would finish in second place to Bobby Labonte the following race at Indianapolis. Shortly thereafter on August 20, Wallace won his third race of the year at Michigan. He would sting together a second consecutive victory the following week at Bristol after winning both the pole and successfully sweeping Bristol on the season in the process. He would claim his eighth and final pole of the year at Phoenix and would finish the year in seventh place with four wins, eight top-fives, and six top-tens.

=== Final years 2001-2005 and retirement ===
The next year in 2001, Wallace had a career best third-place finish at the Daytona 500 and won his only race of the year at California on April 29, He won on what would have been Dale Earnhardt's 50th birthday and paid tribute to him with an Earnhardt flag. He finished the year with six top-fives and five top-fives fishing seventh overall in the standings.

Wallace did not win any races during the 2002 campaign, he did win one pole at Dover on September 22, and claimed two second-place finishes at Bristol, Indianapolis and Phoenix throughout the year. He still managed a top-ten finish at the end of the year with five top-fives and nine top-tens. In 2003, Penske Racing switched to Dodge and appropriately, he once again went winless on the year and Wallace finished in 14th place in the standings with two Top 5's and nine Top 10's.

In 2004, Wallace claimed a second-place finish at Bristol on March 28. Then two races later on April 18, Wallace would claim his 55th and final victory of his career at Martinsville after starting 17th. He would also win the pole at Charlotte on May 22. He finished the year in 16th place.

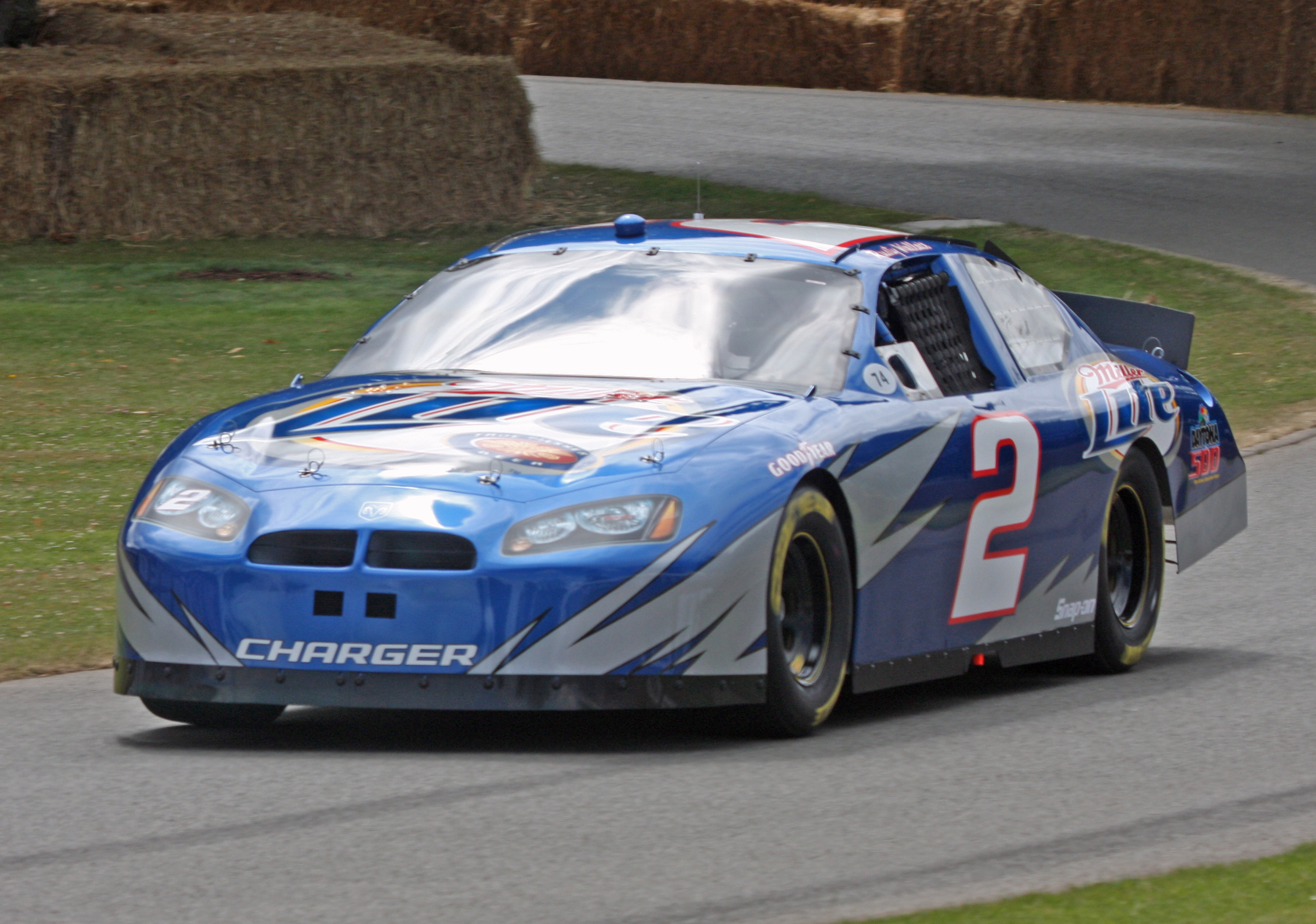
2005 Nextel Cup car at the Goodwood Festival of Speed

On August 30, 2004, Wallace announced that the 2005 NASCAR NEXTEL Cup season would be his last as a full-time driver. Although at the time the possibility remained that he may have continued to run a limited schedule after the 2005 season—as semi-retirees Bill Elliott and Terry Labonte also have done, Wallace's broadcasting contract at the time prevented him from doing so. Kurt Busch would replace Wallace in the No. 2 Miller Lite Dodge in 2006–2010. In 2011, Brad Keselowski began driving the number 2.

In 2006, Wallace returned to his General Motors roots when he raced a Crawford-Pontiac sportscar, painted black and carrying the familiar stylized No. 2. The car was sponsored by Callaway Golf, in the Rolex 24 at Daytona, teamed with Danica Patrick and Allan McNish, In 2008, his Nationwide Series cars switched from Dodge to Chevrolet.

Wallace finished his career with the 1989 Winston Cup Championship, 36 career poles, and 55 career wins. As of 2022, the 55 wins is 11th on NASCAR's all-time wins list. They include victories at Charlotte as well as the series' last three road courses (Riverside, Infineon and Watkins Glen), but none at Daytona, Darlington, Indianapolis, or Talladega. He has the most short track wins in NASCAR history with 34, and therefore he is considered among the best short track drivers in NASCAR history. He retired after the 2005 season with a 14.4 career average finish.

In 2014, Wallace ran at Daytona for testing before the 2014 Daytona 500 as part of a promotion for Miller Lite's 40th anniversary, marking the first time a NASCAR Hall of Famer has driven in a NASCAR test. When asked about the testing, Wallace stated, "It all started at Homestead. I was standing between the 48 (Jimmie Johnson) and 2 (Brad Keselowski) cars joking around and those guys were egging me on to get back in a car and when Brad got wind of it, he called me up two weeks later and was serious about it and Roger (Penske) was all for it. Everyone in the world has been on me to test. 'Why haven't you been back in a car?' This here kind of got me."

==== Major crashes ====
Wallace's legacy, besides being a close rival of Dale Earnhardt, was a number of severe wrecks he endured, especially at restrictor plate racetracks. The first one happened in 1983, when Wallace was attempting the Daytona 500 through the Gatorade Twin 125's. He was tapped by Rick Wilson, got airborne, and went on a spectacular series of flips that left him hospitalized. His next flip came at Bristol Motor Speedway in 1988. What started it was unclear, but Wallace somehow managed to climb the wall and did a barrel roll. The roof of his car caved in. ESPN commentator Dr. Jerry Punch was the first responder, and possibly saved his life. In 1993, Wallace had two massive flips – both at plate tracks. The first was at the 1993 Daytona 500, where he was tapped by the crashing cars of Michael Waltrip and Derrike Cope, and barrel rolled multiple times in the grass on the back straightaway several feet in the air. Months later, at Talladega, racing to the checkered flag, Wallace was tagged from behind by Dale Earnhardt, turned backwards, and flew into the air before violently flipping in the grass past the start-finish line, breaking a wrist (the area where Wallace's car wrecked has since been paved over). Earnhardt was visibly shaken by the incident and did make sure Wallace was okay by checking on him after the race had concluded. Wallace finished 80 points behind Earnhardt in the final points for 1993. He also had an airborne crash in his last Gatorade Twin in 2005 when Dave Blaney clipped his right rear tire and sent his car off the ground. The car never turned over though.

=== Other racing ===
Wallace made his debut in International Race of Champions in 1989 and won his debut race at Daytona International Speedway on February 17, he started the race in last place and went on to win the race marking the first time an IROC driver had won after starting in last. During the 1991 IROC, Wallace lost the first race however he then went on to the next three races at Talladega, Michigan, and Watkins Glen which is the record for season victories. This resulted in Wallace winning the series championship. In total he participated in the series nine times from 1989, 1990, 1991, 1992, 1994 1995, 1996, 1999 and 2000.

A year after his retirement in 2006, Wallace competed in a PRA Big Car Series open-wheel race at the Stafford Motor Speedway. Wallace went on to win the race holding off both Al Unser Jr and Sammy Swindell.

On April 1, 2015, Wallace tested a Stadium Super Truck owned by former NASCAR driver Robby Gordon, and the following day, he announced he would race in the series' X Games round in Austin. After finishing last in his heat race, he was relegated to the last-chance qualifier. During the LCQ, Wallace rolled his truck, but continued running; he finished sixth in the event but failed to qualify for the feature.

In 2016, Wallace competed in the Ferrari Finali Mondiali at Daytona. Driving for "Ferrari of Houston", Wallace finished tenth overall and third in the Professional, North America class.

== Legacy ==
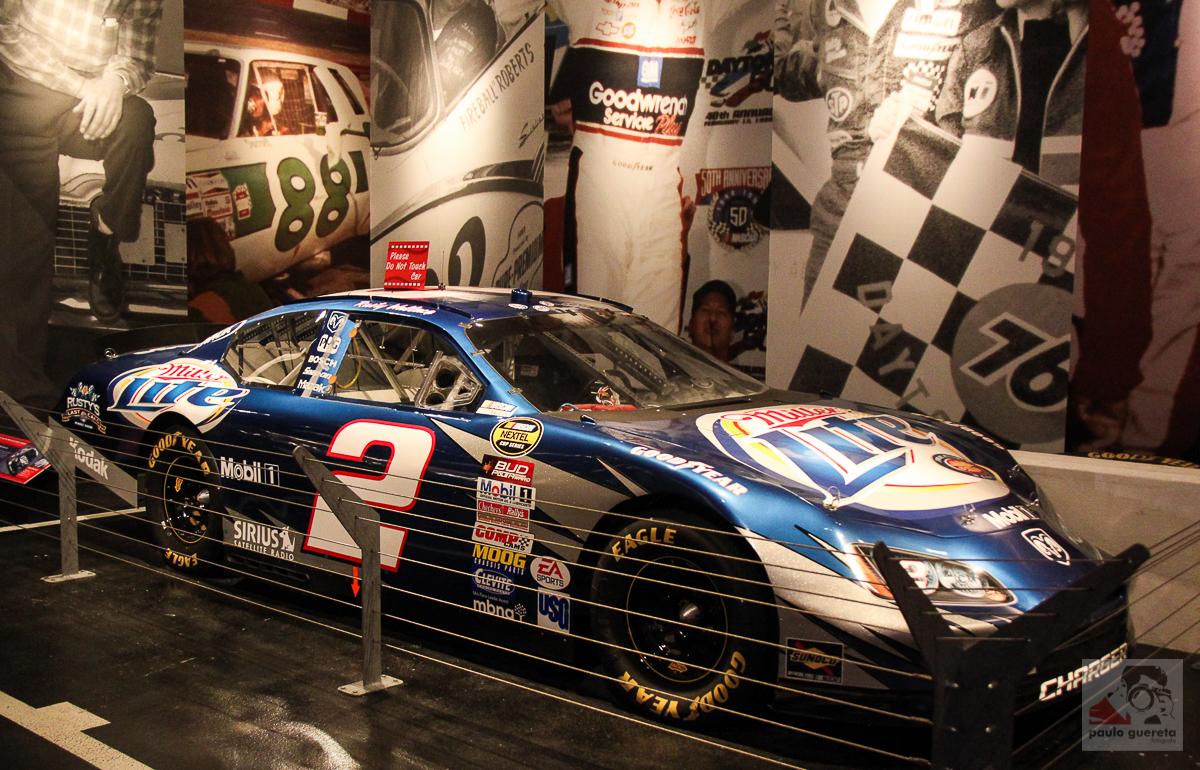
Wallace's car on display at Daytona International Speedway

Wallace finished his NASCAR career with 55 total victories, 349 top-tens and 36 poles. He is often regarded among the best short track and road course drivers in NASCAR history. For 16 straight seasons from 1986 to 2001 Wallace won at least one race in NASCAR's Sprint Cup Series the third longest winning streak in history. He also led 19,951 total laps throughout his career. At the time of his retirement he ranked among the top five money winners in NASCAR history with nearly $55 million in earnings.

=== Awards and honors ===
Wallace was inducted into the Motorsports Press Association Hall of Fame in 2010, the NASCAR Hall of Fame in 2013, and the International Motorsports Hall of Fame in 2013. Making him one of 20 racers to compete the "triple crown" of America's auto racing halls of fame. Additionally he was Inducted into the Motorsports Hall of Fame of America in 2014.

In 2005 Wallace was awarded the Silver Antelope Award presented by Scouting America for outstanding service to young people within one of the organization's divisions. In 1998 he was Inducted into the Missouri Sports Hall of Fame and was later honored as a legend by the museum in 2006.

Following his retirement in 2005 Wallace received a plethora of honors. He was named NASCAR Illustrated Person of the Year Award recipient. The AARWBA Rick Mears "Good Guy" Award for his longtime cooperation with the American Auto Racing Writers and Broadcasters Association. Wallace was a recipient of the Myers Brothers Award recipient for outstanding contributions to stock car racing. He also awarded North Carolina's highest civilian honor Order of the Long Leaf Pine by governor Michael F. Easley and Delaware's highest civilian honor the Order of the First State by governor Ruth Ann Minner. Additionally Rusty Wallace day was declared in multiple states such as Texas, Alabama, Virginia, Delaware and the city of St. Louis where he was also given the key to the city. In 2006 a historical marker in Wallace's honor was dedicated outside of Bristol Motor Speedway.

Wallace was inducted into the St. Louis Sports Hall of Fame and the North Carolina Auto Racing Hall of Fame in 2011. In 2023 Wallace received the Buddy Shuman Award for efforts and contributions made to advance the sport. On May 3, 2024, Wallace served as the grand marshal for the ASA Tar Heel 250 at Hickory Motor Speedway. He also served as the Grand Marshal for the NASCAR Cup Series Window World 450 at North Wilkesboro Speedway on July 19, 2026.

=== Records and milestones ===
- With 55 career points-paying victories, Wallace is ranked eleventh among the all-time NASCAR Cup Series winners; he is ranked tenth (in a tie with Bobby Allison) among those who have competed during the sport's modern era (1972–present).
- Wallace won the final two races at Riverside International Raceway in 1987 and 1988
- Inaugural winner at New Hampshire Motor Speedway in 1993
- Winner of the inaugural NASCAR race at in Japan in 1996
- Only driver to win three straight races in the IROC in 1991 at Talladega, Michigan, and Watkins Glen, also tied a series record for wins in a season with 3
- First driver to win an IROC race after starting in last place in 1989 at Daytona International Speedway

== Post Retirement ==
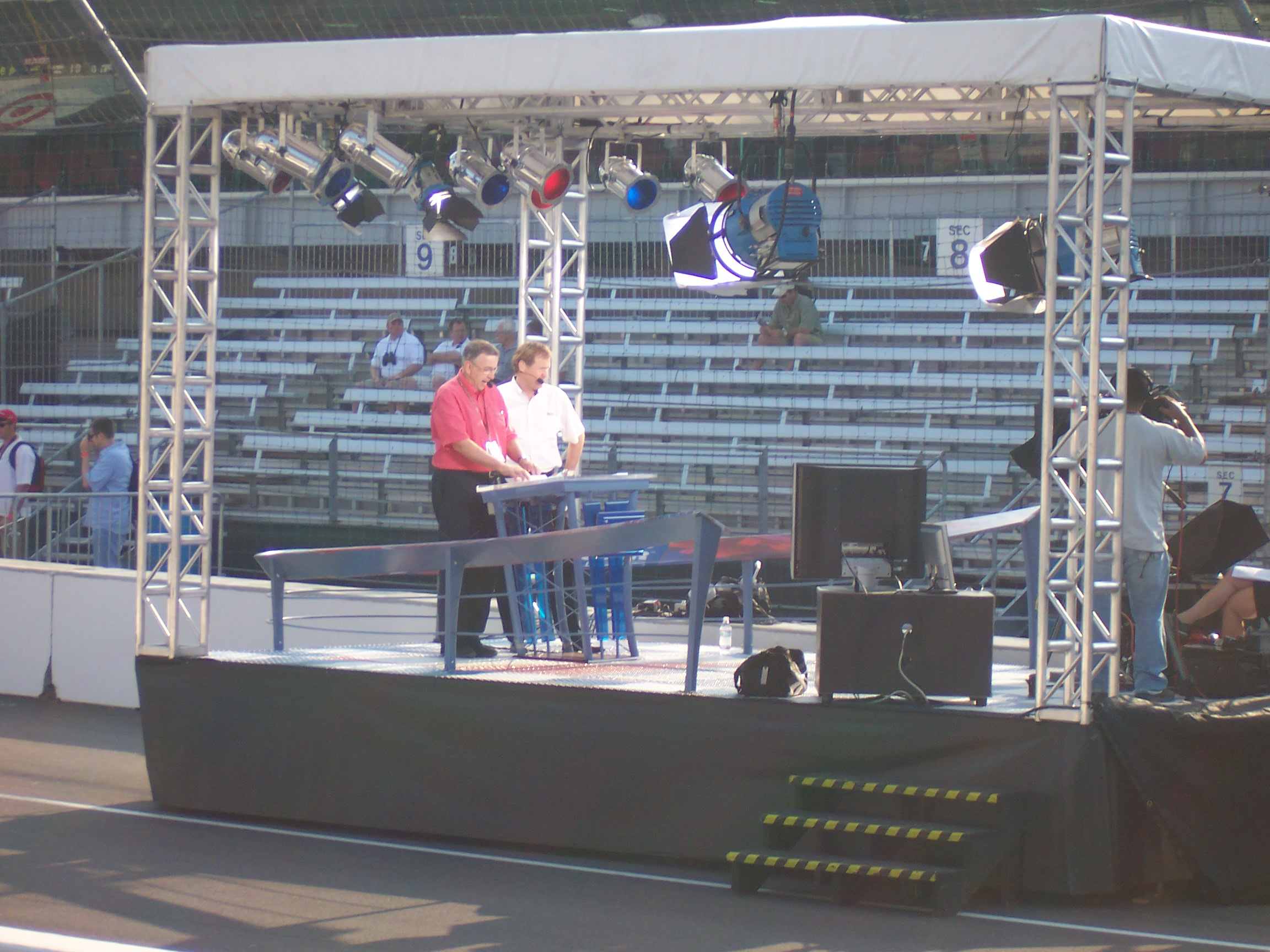
Brent Musburger and Wallace prepare to report from the ABC-TV pre-race stage at the 2006 Indianapolis 500.

=== Broadcasting ===
On January 25, 2006, it was announced that Wallace would cover auto racing events for ESPN and ABC. Despite Wallace's lack of open-wheel racing experience, his assignments began with the IndyCar Series and included the Indianapolis 500 (in a perhaps forgivable lapse, he described a thrilling battle on the last lap as "The most exciting Daytona 500 ever!"). He joined the NASCAR broadcasting team for both networks when they started coverage of the sport in 2007. He signed a six-year deal with ESPN in 2006. He returned to commentate for the 2007 Indianapolis 500 won by Dario Franchitti. He co-hosted NASCAR Angels with Shannon Wiseman. Wallace worked with ESPN from 2007 to 2014 until their contract with NASCAR expired.

Since the 2015 Daytona 500, Wallace has worked with Motor Racing Network as a booth announcer.

=== Car owner ===
Up until 2012, Wallace owned and operated Rusty Wallace Racing, which fielded the No. 62 Pilot Flying J Toyota Camry driven by Michael Annett and the No. 66 5 Hour Energy Toyota Camry driven by his son Steve Wallace. This operation was temporarily suspended due to the loss of sponsorship. However, Steve Wallace confirmed on his Twitter account that the team would return for the Nationwide Series race at Richmond in May 2012 in a former Roush Fenway Racing Ford Mustang, powered by a Roush-Yates engine in the No. 4 sponsored by LoanMax Title Loans. Due to lack of sponsorship in 2013, Wallace's team ran one race in a No. 66 entry finishing 25th at Charlotte, then closed at the conclusion of the season.

== Personal life ==
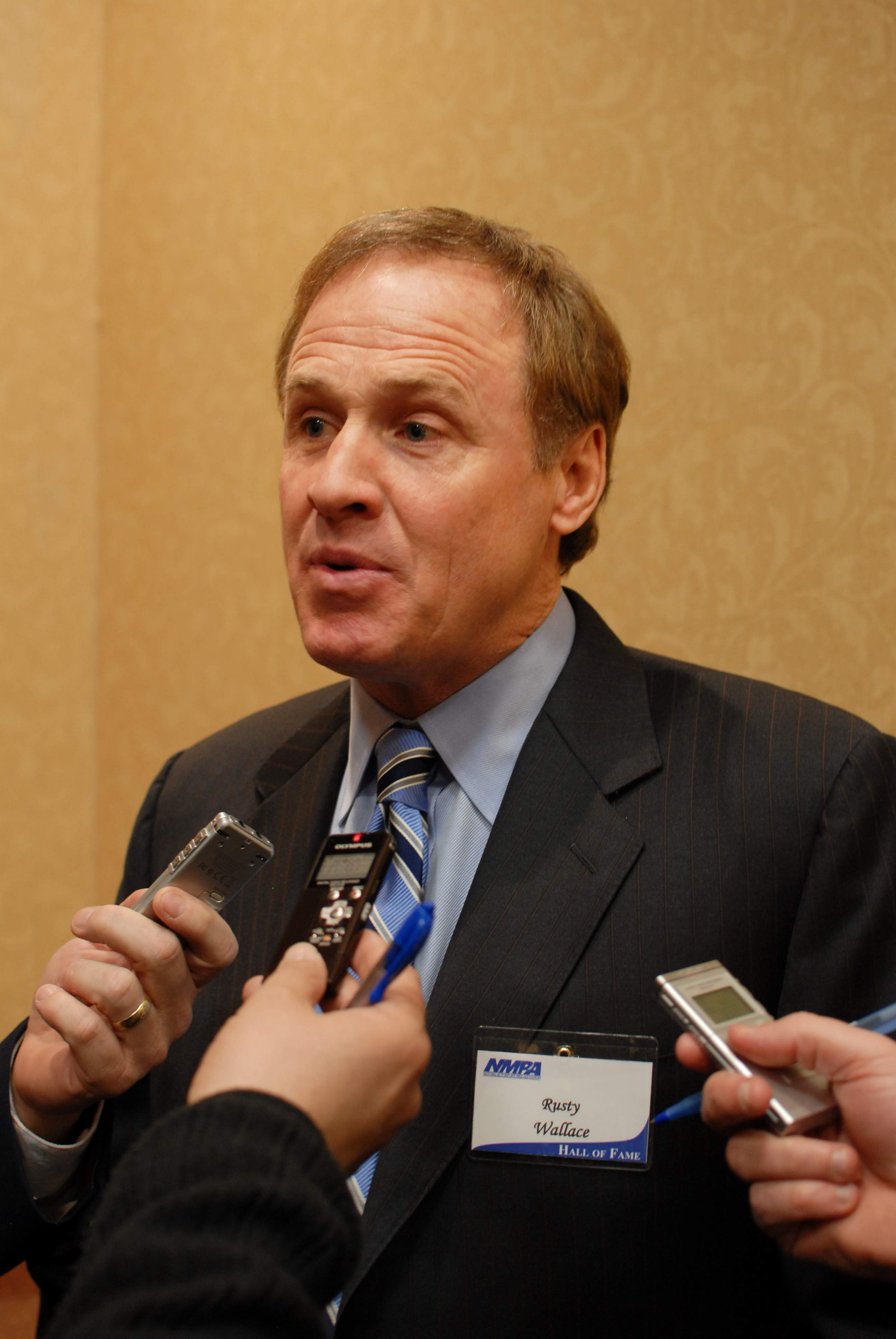
Wallace answering questions from the media in 2010

=== Family ===
Wallace's brothers, Kenny and Mike, also used to race on the NASCAR circuit. He and his wife Patti have three children – Greg, Katie, and Stephen along with multiple grandchildren. Stephen raced full-time in the NASCAR Xfinity Series and made his Cup Series debut during the 2011 Daytona 500, making him the fourth member of his family to compete in the Daytona 500 and in NASCAR, behind the Bodines (Geoff, Brett, and Todd), Pettys (Lee, Richard, and Kyle), Earnhardts (Ralph, Dale, Dale Jr. and Jeffrey), and the Allisons (Bobby, Donnie, and Davey).

Wallace's father, Russell Wallace Sr., died on October 30, 2011, at age 77.

Wallace's niece Chrissy and nephew Matt also went on to compete in the NASCAR O'Reilly and Truck Series respectively.

=== Charity work ===
Wallace serves on the board of directors of The NASCAR Foundation as the head of its development committee, a position he has held since the organization's founding in 2006. He does a majority of the fundraising through his annual motorcycle ride through Sturgis, South Dakota which he started in 2019. The profits also go to Special Olympics South Dakota. The 2025 iteration of the event raised over $500,000. Wallace and his car dealership in Knoxville, Tennessee also hold multiple motorcycle rally's which raise funds for hospitals, youth programs and other local organizations. In total Wallace has raised millions of dollars for multiple causes.

=== Other endeavors and interests ===
Since 1994 Wallace has served as the principal stakeholder in the Rusty Wallace Automotive Group, which consists of nine dealerships In Tennessee, featuring prominent car brands such as Ford, KIA and Toyota.

In 2010 Wallace helped create the Rusty Wallace Driving Experience, which was a company that offered the public a chance to drive a stock car at various racetracks across the United States. Wallace stepped away from the company in 2015 when he began to venture into broadcasting. However it continued up until 2024 when Wallace removed his name from the business and it eventually shut down in August of that year.

In 2019 Wallace co founded Southern Country Customs, a premier builder of custom motorcycles which he works on with his son Steven.

Wallace has become a public speaker, he is also a golfer and pilot, having over 12 thousand hours of flight time.

== Iowa Speedway ==
In late 2005, Wallace broke ground on his "Signature Design Speedway" in Newton, Iowa. Iowa Speedway had its first race on September 15, 2006, and hosted many races in 2007 including an IndyCar race. The track is noted for its structural similarity to Richmond International Raceway, where Wallace has won six times. Iowa Speedway hosted its first NASCAR Nationwide Series and first NASCAR Craftsman Truck Series race in 2009. Iowa Speedway hosted their first NASCAR Cup Series race on June 16, 2024. On December 4, 2023, it was announced that the inaugural NASCAR Cup Series race there was officially sold out. The inaugural race was a huge success with guest appearances from Rusty throughout the weekend. The cup series returned to Iowa Speedway on the first weekend of August 2025.

The tracks location 3333 Rusty Wallace Drive is named in his honor.

== Endorsements ==
- 2003 – Callaway Golf – Callaway Golf Signs NASCAR Driver Rusty Wallace to Multiyear Endorsement and Licensing Agreement.
- 2009 – U.S. Fidelis – USfidelis TV Campaign Debuts, Featuring NASCAR's Steve and Rusty Wallace. The March 2010 bankruptcy of US Fidelis lists Rusty Wallace Racing as a creditor owed $535,439.
- 2009 – Lista International Corporation – Legendary NASCAR Driver Rusty Wallace Endorses Lista Products in New Online Video

== Other media ==
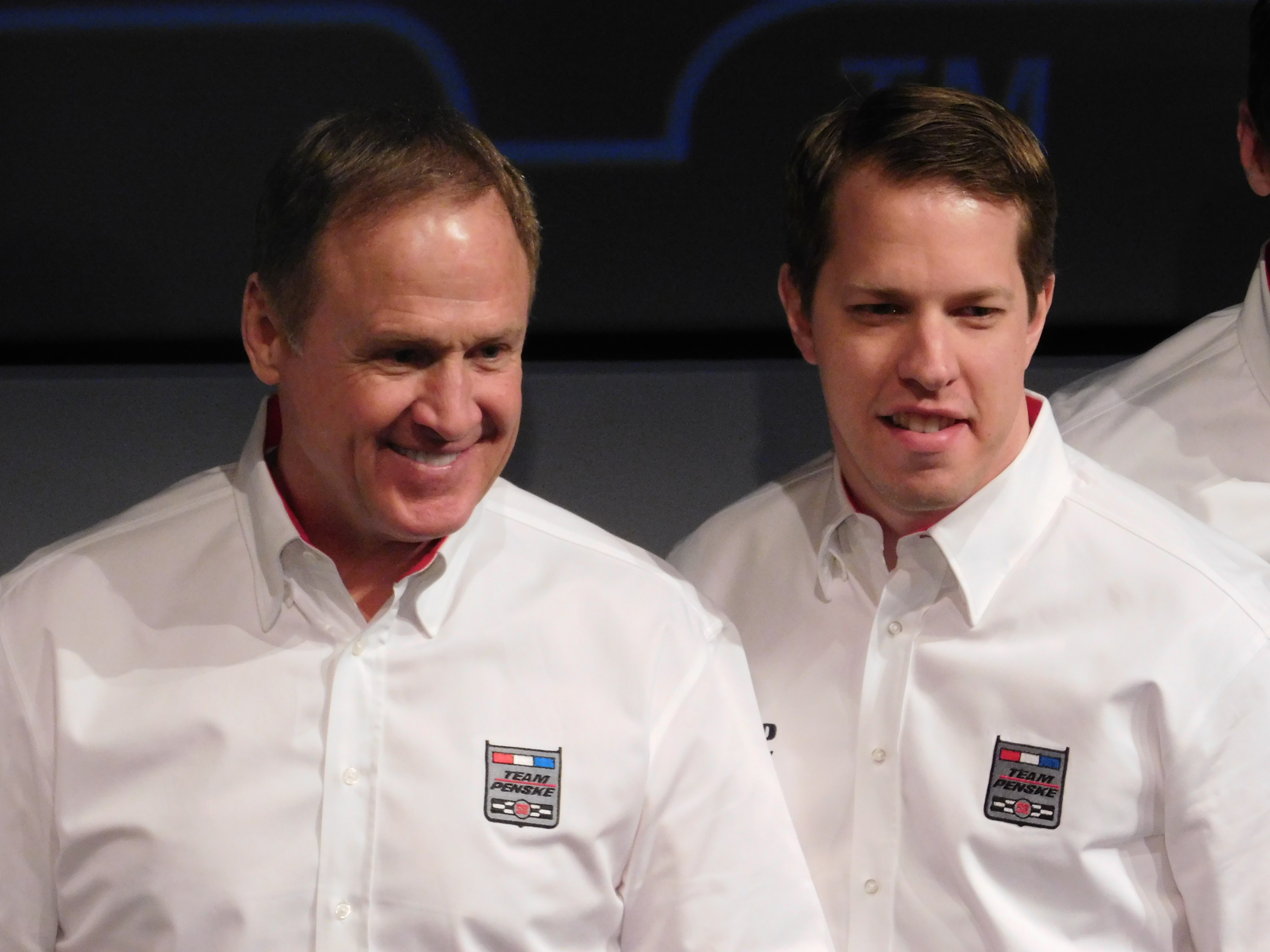
Wallace with Brad Keselowski in 2016

Wallace made a cameo appearance in the movie Days of Thunder. He and his brothers all appeared in the Electronic Arts video game NASCAR Rumble. Mike was featured as a Craftsman Truck Series driver, driving the No. 2 ASE Ford (no specific car makes for the Trucks; the real truck was a Ford at the time), Kenny was featured in the game driving the No. 55 Square D Chevrolet (although the game's commercial showed him driving the No. 81 Square D Ford) & Rusty was featured in the game driving his No. 2 Ford, with the exception that the Miller Lite stickers are replaced by Penske Racing stickers similar to current Penske Championship Racing driver Brad Keselowski, whose sponsor is censored by NASCAR's ban on wireless telephone advertising. In the video for "Nowadays" by Lil Skies featuring Landon Cube, Cube can be seen wearing a vintage Rusty Wallace jacket. In 2018 Wallace voiced himself in an episode of Milo Murphy's Law.

== Motorsports career results ==
=== NASCAR ===
(key) (Bold – Pole position awarded by qualifying time. Italics – Pole position earned by points standings or practice time. * – Most laps led.)

==== Nextel Cup Series ====
NASCAR Nextel Cup Series results
Year	Team	No.	Make	1	2	3	4	5	6	7	8	9	10	11	12	13	14	15	16	17	18	19	20	21	22	23	24	25	26	27	28	29	30	31	32	33	34	35	36	NNCC	Pts	Ref
1980	Penske Racing	16	Chevy	RSD	DAY	RCH	CAR	ATL; 2	BRI	DAR	NWS	MAR	TAL	NSV	DOV	CLT	TWS	RSD	MCH	DAY	NSV	POC	TAL	MCH	BRI	DAR	RCH	DOV	NWS	MAR	CLT; 14	CAR	ATL	ONT						57th	291	
1981	Benfield Racing	98	Pontiac	RSD	DAY	RCH	CAR	ATL	BRI	NWS	DAR	MAR	TAL	NSV	DOV	CLT; 30	TWS	RSD	MCH	DAY	NSV	POC	TAL; 21	MCH	BRI	DAR	RCH	DOV	MAR	NWS										64th	-	
1981	John Childs	72	Buick																												CLT; 6	CAR	ATL; 29	RSD						64th	-	
1982	John Childs	72	Buick	DAY; 37	RCH	BRI	ATL; 35	CAR	DAR	NWS	MAR	TAL	NSV	DOV	CLT; 29	POC	RSD	MCH	DAY	NSV	POC	TAL	MCH	BRI	DAR	RCH	DOV	NWS	CLT	MAR	CAR	ATL	RSD							65th	186	
1983	John Childs	72	Buick	DAY; DNQ	RCH	CAR	ATL	DAR	NWS	MAR	TAL	NSV	DOV	BRI	CLT	RSD	POC	MCH	DAY	NSV	POC	TAL	MCH	BRI	DAR	RCH	DOV	MAR	NWS	CLT	CAR	ATL	RSD							NA	-	
1984	Cliff Stewart Racing	88	Pontiac	DAY; 30	RCH; 16	CAR; 26	ATL; 19	BRI; 12	NWS; 28	DAR; 30	MAR; 15	TAL; 31	NSV; 6	DOV; 11	CLT; 15	RSD; 20	POC; 17	MCH; 14	DAY; 20	NSV; 18	POC; 6	TAL; 12	MCH; 35	BRI; 20	DAR; 4	RCH; 11	DOV; 30	MAR; 13	CLT; 14	NWS; 5	CAR; 26	ATL; 15	RSD; 26							14th	3316	
1985	Cliff Stewart Racing	2	Pontiac	DAY; 8	RCH; 27	CAR; 9	ATL; 27	BRI; 5	DAR; 5	NWS; 22	MAR; 10	TAL; 37	DOV; 18	CLT; 8	RSD; 24	POC; 13	MCH; 26	DAY; 41	POC; 33	TAL; 17	MCH; 7	BRI; 12	DAR; 38	RCH; 13	DOV; 31	MAR; 25	NWS; 25	CLT; 30	CAR; 9	ATL; 21	RSD; 36									19th	2867	
1986	Blue Max Racing	27	Pontiac	DAY; 8	RCH; 10	CAR; 12	ATL; 8	BRI; 1*	DAR; 6	NWS; 10	MAR; 30	TAL; 13	DOV; 26	CLT; 10	RSD; 4	POC; 6	MCH; 19	DAY; 8	POC; 27	TAL; 35	GLN; 6	MCH; 6	BRI; 14	DAR; 23	RCH; 19	DOV; 13	MAR; 1	NWS; 4	CLT; 8	CAR; 19	ATL; 13	RSD; 8								6th	3762	
1987	Blue Max Racing	27	Pontiac	DAY; 41	CAR; 6	RCH; 3	ATL; 3	DAR; 20	NWS; 9	BRI; 16	MAR; 2	TAL; 6	CLT; 10	DOV; 17	POC; 40	RSD; 41	**MCH**; 5	DAY; 8	POC; 14	TAL; 8	GLN; 1*	MCH; 4	BRI; 2	DAR; 2	RCH; 17	DOV; 12	MAR; 28	NWS; 10	CLT; 22	CAR; 12	RSD; 1	ATL; 12								5th	3818	
1988	Blue Max Racing	27	Pontiac	DAY; 7	RCH; 7	CAR; 14	ATL; 2	DAR; 25	BRI; 4	NWS; 4	MAR; 16	TAL; 10	CLT; 2	DOV; 3	RSD; 1*	POC; 3	MCH; 1*	DAY; 12	POC; 24	TAL; 5	GLN; 2	MCH; 2*	BRI; 9	DAR; 2	RCH; 35	DOV; 3	**MAR**; 3	CLT; 1	NWS; 1	CAR; 1	PHO; 5	**ATL**; 1*								2nd	4464	
1989	Blue Max Racing	27	Pontiac	DAY; 18	**CAR**; 1*	ATL; 31*	RCH; 1	DAR; 8	BRI; 1	**NWS**; 9	MAR; 31	TAL; 10	CLT; 31	DOV; 5	**SON**; 2	**POC**; 22*	MCH; 2*	DAY; 17	POC; 2*	TAL; 37	GLN; 1	MCH; 1*	BRI; 6	DAR; 4	RCH; 1*	DOV; 7	MAR; 4*	CLT; 8	NWS; 7	CAR; 2*	PHO; 16	ATL; 15								1st	4176	
1990	Blue Max Racing	27	Pontiac	DAY; 7	RCH; 6*	CAR; 5	ATL; 24	DAR; 18	BRI; 28	NWS; 7	MAR; 2	TAL; 20	CLT; 1*	DOV; 10*	SON; 1*	POC; 2	MCH; 17	DAY; 14	POC; 3	TAL; 32	GLN; 34*	MCH; 3	BRI; 2	DAR; 40	RCH; 5	DOV; 7	MAR; 15	NWS; 8	CLT; 38	CAR; 32	**PHO**; 38	**ATL**; 9								6th	3676	
1991	Penske Racing	2	Pontiac	DAY; 27	RCH; 4	CAR; 28	ATL; 10	DAR; 5	**BRI**; 1	NWS; 32	MAR; 21	TAL; 26	CLT; 22	DOV; 9	SON; 3*	POC; 31	MCH; 17	DAY; 12	POC; 1	TAL; 6	GLN; 4	MCH; 3	BRI; 32	DAR; 32	**RCH**; 3	DOV; 25	MAR; 7	NWS; 6	CLT; 27	CAR; 11	PHO; 5	ATL; 34								10th	3582	
1992	Penske Racing	2	Pontiac	DAY; 31	CAR; 26	RCH; 17	ATL; 15	DAR; 11	BRI; 9	NWS; 2	MAR; 31	TAL; 11	CLT; 18	DOV; 3	SON; 7	POC; 24	MCH; 37	DAY; 9	POC; 18	TAL; 11	GLN; 6	MCH; 21	BRI; 10	DAR; 9	RCH; 1*	DOV; 16	MAR; 2*	NWS; 4	CLT; 37	CAR; 21	**PHO**; 28*	ATL; 6								13th	3556	
1993	Penske Racing	2	Pontiac	DAY; 32	CAR; 1*	RCH; 2	**ATL**; 3	DAR; 5	**BRI**; 1*	NWS; 1	MAR; 1*	TAL; 6	SON; 38	CLT; 29	DOV; 21	POC; 39	MCH; 5	DAY; 18	NHA; 1	POC; 2	TAL; 17	GLN; 19	MCH; 6	BRI; 2*	DAR; 3	RCH; 1*	**DOV**; 1*	MAR; 2	NWS; 1*	CLT; 4	CAR; 1*	PHO; 19	ATL; 1*							2nd	4446	
1994	Penske Racing	2	Ford	DAY; 41	CAR; 1*	RCH; 2	ATL; 24	DAR; 33	BRI; 7	NWS; 2	**MAR**; 1*	TAL; 33	SON; 5	CLT; 2*	DOV; 1	**POC**; 1*	MCH; 1*	DAY; 26	NHA; 3	POC; 9	TAL; 42	IND; 4	GLN; 17	MCH; 4	BRI; 1	DAR; 7	RCH; 4	DOV; 1	MAR; 1*	NWS; 4	CLT; 37	CAR; 35	PHO; 17	ATL; 32						3rd	4207	
1995	Penske Racing	2	Ford	DAY; 34	CAR; 24	RCH; 3*	ATL; 10	DAR; 23	BRI; 2	NWS; 4	MAR; 1*	TAL; 20	SON; 20	CLT; 34	DOV; 9	POC; 17	MCH; 3	DAY; 27	NHA; 6	POC; 16*	TAL; 30	IND; 2	GLN; 26	MCH; 5	BRI; 21	DAR; 3	RCH; 1*	DOV; 3	MAR; 3	NWS; 2	CLT; 9	CAR; 2	PHO; 4	ATL; 3						5th	4240	
1996	Penske Racing	2	Ford	DAY; 16	CAR; 22	RCH; 7	ATL; 36	DAR; 4	BRI; 5	NWS; 33	MAR; 1	TAL; 30	SON; 1*	CLT; 34	DOV; 7	POC; 31	MCH; 1	DAY; 31	NHA; 7	POC; 1	TAL; 10	IND; 7	GLN; 33	MCH; 39	BRI; 1*	DAR; 38	RCH; 6	DOV; 2	MAR; 36	NWS; 10	CLT; 8	CAR; 8	PHO; 40	ATL; 10						7th	3717	
1997	Penske Racing	2	Ford	DAY; 41	CAR; 6	RCH; 1	ATL; 31	DAR; 6	TEX; 37	**BRI**; 2*	MAR; 5	SON; 40	TAL; 37	CLT; 2	DOV; 39	POC; 22	MCH; 29	CAL; 14	DAY; 6	NHA; 3	POC; 37	IND; 38	GLN; 3	MCH; 13	BRI; 12	DAR; 43	RCH; 5	NHA; 21	DOV; 16	MAR; 15*	CLT; 12	TAL; 10	CAR; 18	PHO; 2*	ATL; 32					9th	3598	
1998	Penske–Kranefuss Racing	2	Ford	DAY; 5	CAR; 2	LVS; 3	ATL; 4	DAR; 3	**BRI**; 33*	TEX; 12	MAR; 6	TAL; 12	CAL; 34	CLT; 2	**DOV**; 18	RCH; 3	MCH; 17	POC; 42	SON; 5	NHA; 4	POC; 6	IND; 8	GLN; 4	MCH; 23	**BRI**; 3	NHA; 8	DAR; 7	**RCH**; 7	DOV; 5	MAR; 28	CLT; 26	TAL; 27	DAY; 5	PHO; 1*	CAR; 3	ATL; 20				4th	4501	
1999	Penske–Kranefuss Racing	2	Ford	DAY; 8*	CAR; 10	LVS; 9	ATL; 35	DAR; 33	TEX; 4	**BRI**; 1*	MAR; 7*	TAL; 41	CAL; 11	RCH; 5	CLT; 31	DOV; 6	MCH; 12	POC; 43	SON; 4	DAY; 11*	NHA; 42	POC; 18	IND; 8	**GLN**; 3	MCH; 16	BRI; 18	DAR; 8	RCH; 14	**NHA**; 6*	**DOV**; 32	MAR; 4	CLT; 8	TAL; 11	CAR; 5	PHO; 32	HOM; 12	ATL; 13			8th	4155	
2000	Penske–Kranefuss Racing	2	Ford	DAY; 4	**CAR**; 11	LVS; 15	ATL; 32	DAR; 16	BRI; 1	TEX; 4	**MAR**; 10*	TAL; 41	CAL; 8	**RCH**; 5*	CLT; 8	**DOV**; 14	MCH; 7	**POC**; 10*	**SON**; 26	DAY; 3	**NHA**; 15	POC; 1	IND; 2*	GLN; 34	MCH; 1*	**BRI**; 1*	DAR; 30	RCH; 34	NHA; 5	DOV; 8	MAR; 23	CLT; 21	TAL; 8	CAR; 5	**PHO**; 4	HOM; 15	ATL; 7			7th	4544	
2001	Penske Racing South	2	Ford	DAY; 3	CAR; 7	LVS; 43	ATL; 12	DAR; 10	BRI; 7	TEX; 12	MAR; 13	TAL; 13	CAL; 1*	RCH; 3*	CLT; 14	DOV; 21	MCH; 41	POC; 16	SON; 5	DAY; 7	CHI; 13	NHA; 43	POC; 6	IND; 4	GLN; 43	MCH; 17	BRI; 5	DAR; 22	RCH; 5*	DOV; 11	KAN; 4*	CLT; 7	MAR; 15	TAL; 16	PHO; 15	CAR; 24	HOM; 12	ATL; 12	NHA; 18	7th	4481	
2002	Penske Racing South	2	Ford	DAY; 18	CAR; 8	LVS; 11	ATL; 6	DAR; 7	BRI; 9	TEX; 11	MAR; 16	TAL; 8	CAL; 8	RCH; 25	CLT; 10	DOV; 17	POC; 9	MCH; 7	SON; 27	DAY; 2	CHI; 25	NHA; 4	POC; 40	IND; 2	GLN; 17	MCH; 24	BRI; 2	DAR; 22	RCH; 15	NHA; 19	**DOV**; 15	KAN; 3	TAL; 13	CLT; 5	MAR; 9	ATL; 17	CAR; 27	PHO; 2	HOM; 14	7th	4574	
2003	Penske Racing South	2	Dodge	DAY; 25	CAR; 6*	LVS; 40	ATL; 15	DAR; 16	BRI; 14	TEX; 14	TAL; 37	MAR; 8	CAL; 3	RCH; 10	CLT; 12	DOV; 6	POC; 16	MCH; 12	SON; 8	DAY; 28	CHI; 32	NHA; 17	POC; 11	IND; 10	GLN; 37	MCH; 38	BRI; 43	DAR; 36	RCH; 5	NHA; 6	DOV; 10	TAL; 9	KAN; 9	CLT; 13	MAR; 29	ATL; 19	PHO; 33	CAR; 23	HOM; 23	14th	3950	
2004	Penske-Jasper Racing	2	Dodge	DAY; 29	CAR; 7	LVS; 10	ATL; 35	DAR; 29	BRI; 2	TEX; 5	MAR; 1	TAL; 33	CAL; 35	RCH; 16	CLT; 10	DOV; 13	POC; 32	MCH; 22	SON; 28	DAY; 27	CHI; 11	NHA; 30	POC; 17	IND; 13	GLN; 25	MCH; 36	BRI; 26	CAL; 10	RCH; 10	NHA; 14	DOV; 13	TAL; 26	KAN; 18	CLT; 31	MAR; 10	ATL; 11	PHO; 7	DAR; 18	HOM; 8	16th	3960	
2005	Penske-Jasper Racing	2	Dodge	DAY; 10	CAL; 10	LVS; 12	ATL; 27	BRI; 13*	MAR; 5	TEX; 10	PHO; 36	TAL; 22	DAR; 12	RCH; 19	CLT; 10	DOV; 5	POC; 11	MCH; 10	SON; 4	DAY; 4	CHI; 12	NHA; 8	POC; 2	IND; 25	GLN; 6	MCH; 13	BRI; 5	CAL; 15	RCH; 5	NHA; 6	DOV; 3	TAL; 25	KAN; 7	CLT; 24	MAR; 19	ATL; 37	TEX; 22	PHO; 29	HOM; 13	8th	6140	

===== Daytona 500 =====
Year	Team	Manufacturer	Start	Finish
1982	John Childs	Buick	19	37
1983	John Childs	Buick	DNQ	
1984	Cliff Stewart Racing	Pontiac	27	30
1985	Cliff Stewart Racing	Pontiac	22	8
1986	Blue Max Racing	Pontiac	9	8
1987	Blue Max Racing	Pontiac	32	41
1988	Blue Max Racing	Pontiac	5	7
1989	Blue Max Racing	Pontiac	35	18
1990	Blue Max Racing	Pontiac	38	7
1991	Penske Racing	Pontiac	8	27
1992	Penske Racing	Pontiac	17	31
1993	Penske Racing	Pontiac	34	32
1994	Penske Racing	Ford	5	41
1995	Penske Racing	Ford	7	34
1996	Penske Racing	Ford	43	16
1997	Penske Racing	Ford	14	41
1998	Penske–Kranefuss Racing	Ford	12	5
1999	Penske–Kranefuss Racing	Ford	10	8
2000	Penske–Kranefuss Racing	Ford	5	4
2001	Penske Racing South	Ford	12	3
2002	Penske Racing South	Ford	37	18
2003	Penske Racing South	Dodge	38	25
2004	Penske-Jasper Racing	Dodge	18	29
2005	Penske-Jasper Racing	Dodge	36	10

==== Busch Series ====
NASCAR Busch Series results
Year	Team	No.	Make	1	2	3	4	5	6	7	8	9	10	11	12	13	14	15	16	17	18	19	20	21	22	23	24	25	26	27	28	29	30	31	32	33	34	35	NBSC	Pts	Ref
1985	Rusty Wallace Racing	66	Pontiac	**DAY**; 4	CAR	HCY	BRI	MAR	DAR	SBO	LGY	DOV																											40th	550	
1985	Rusty Wallace Racing	66	Olds										CLT; 36	SBO	HCY	ROU	IRP	SBO	LGY	HCY	MLW	BRI	DAR; 2	RCH	NWS	ROU	CLT; 3	HCY	CAR	MAR									40th	550	
1986	Rusty Wallace Racing	66	Pontiac	DAY; 9	CAR	HCY	MAR	BRI	DAR	SBO	LGY	JFC	DOV	CLT; 4	SBO	HCY	ROU	IRP	SBO	RAL	OXF	SBO	HCY	LGY	ROU	BRI	DAR; 36	RCH	DOV	MAR	ROU	CLT	CAR	MAR					61st	193	
1987	Shugart Racing	90	Chevy	DAY	HCY	MAR	DAR	BRI; 19	LGY	SBO					JFC; 5	OXF	SBO	HCY	**RAL**; 26*	LGY	ROU	BRI; 25	JFC		RCH; 16		MAR; 22			MAR; 7									32nd	1208	
1987	Blue Max Racing	72	Pontiac								CLT; 33													DAR; 3				CLT; 4	CAR										32nd	1208	
1987	Shugart Racing	90	Buick									DOV; 13	IRP	ROU												DOV; 30													32nd	1208	
1988	Blue Max Racing	72	Pontiac	DAY; 27	HCY	CAR	MAR	DAR; 8	BRI	LNG																													54th	297	
1988	Blue Max Racing	72	Buick								NZH; 13	SBO	NSV																										54th	297	
1988	Rusty Wallace Racing	66	Pontiac											CLT; 30	DOV	ROU	LAN	LVL	MYB	OXF	SBO	HCY	LNG	IRP	ROU	BRI	DAR; 9	RCH	DOV	MAR	CLT; 9	CAR	MAR						54th	297	
1989	Blue Max Racing	72	Pontiac	DAY; 2	CAR	MAR	HCY	DAR; 30	BRI	NZH; 38	SBO	LAN	NSV	CLT; 9	DOV	ROU	LVL	VOL	MYB	SBO	HCY	DUB	IRP	ROU	BRI; 26	DAR; 41	RCH	DOV	MAR	CLT; 35	CAR	MAR							56th	430	
1993	Rusty Wallace Racing	21	Pontiac	DAY	CAR	RCH	DAR	BRI	HCY	ROU	MAR	NZH	CLT	DOV	MYB	GLN	MLW; 33	TAL	IRP	MCH	NHA	BRI	DAR	RCH	DOV	ROU	CLT	MAR	CAR	HCY	ATL								102nd	64	
1997	Penske Racing	2	Ford	DAY	CAR	RCH	ATL	LVS	DAR	HCY	TEX	BRI	NSV	TAL	NHA	NZH	CLT	DOV	SBO	GLN	MLW	MYB	GTY	IRP	MCH	BRI	DAR	RCH	DOV	CLT	CAL; 21	CAR	HOM						124th	-	
2004	Rusty Wallace, Inc.	66	Dodge	DAY	CAR	LVS	DAR	BRI	TEX	NSH	TAL	CAL	GTY	RCH	NZH	CLT	DOV	NSH	KEN	MLW	DAY	CHI	NHA	PPR	IRP	MCH; 6	BRI	CAL	RCH	DOV	KAN	CLT	MEM	ATL	PHO; 7	DAR	HOM		76th	296	
2005	Rusty Wallace, Inc.	64	Dodge	DAY	CAL	MXC; 6	LVS	ATL	NSH	BRI	TEX	PHO	TAL	DAR	RCH	CLT	DOV	NSH	KEN; 24	MLW	DAY	CHI	NHA	PPR	GTY; 37	IRP	GLN	MCH	BRI	CAL	RCH	DOV; 7	KAN; 13	CLT	MEM	TEX; 27	PHO	HOM	61st	650	

==== Craftsman Truck Series ====
NASCAR Craftsman Truck Series results
Year	Team	No.	Make	1	2	3	4	5	6	7	8	9	10	11	12	13	14	15	16	17	18	19	20	21	22	23	24	NCTC	Pts	Ref
1996	Penske Racing	22	Ford	HOM	PHO	POR	EVG	TUS	CNS	HPT	BRI	NZH; 9	MLW	LVL	I70	IRP	FLM	GLN	NSV	RCH	NHA	MAR	NWS	SON	MMR	PHO	LVS	92nd	138	

=== International Race of Champions ===
(key) (Bold – Pole position. * – Most laps led.)

International Race of Champions results
Year	Make	1	2	3	4	Pos.	Pts	Ref
1989	Chevy	DAY; 1	NZH; 3	MCH; 3	GLN; 8	3rd	58	
1990	Dodge	TAL; 7	CLE; 8	MCH; 6		8th	26	
1991	Dodge	DAY; 10	TAL; 1*	MCH; 1*	**GLN**; 1*	1st	86	
1992	Dodge	DAY; 8	TAL; 6	MCH; 2	MCH; 3	4th	47	
1993	Dodge	DAY	DAR; 4	TAL	MCH	NA	0	
1994	Dodge	DAY; 6*	DAR; 2	TAL; 9	MCH; 3*	3rd	56	
1995	Dodge	DAY; 5	DAR; 10	TAL; 9	MCH; 7	9th	32	
1996	Pontiac	DAY; 12	**TAL**; 12	**CLT**; 4	**MCH**; 7	11th	26	
1999	Pontiac	DAY; 9	TAL; 2	MCH; 3	IND; 5	4th	50	
2000	Pontiac	DAY; 6	TAL; 9	MCH; 9	IND; 5	8th	31	

NASCAR exhibition victories

No.	Date	Season	Race	Track	Location	Ref
1	May 21, 1989	1989	The Winston	Charlotte Motor Speedway	Concord, North Carolina	
2	November 24, 1996	1996	Thunder Special Suzuka	Suzuka Circuit	Suzuka, Mie Prefecture, Japan	
3	February 8, 1998	1998	Bud Shootout	Daytona International Speedway	Daytona Beach, Florida	

Sporting positions
Preceded by Bill Elliott	NASCAR Winston Cup Champion; 1989	Succeeded by Dale Earnhardt
Preceded by Dale Earnhardt	IROC Champion; IROC XV (1991)	Succeeded by Ricky Rudd
Preceded by Mark Martin	ASA National Tour Champion; 1983	Succeeded by Dick Trickle
Achievements
Preceded by Darrell Waltrip	Coca-Cola 600 winner 1990	Succeeded by Davey Allison
Preceded by Terry Labonte	The Winston winner 1989	Succeeded by Dale Earnhardt
Awards
Preceded by Sterling Marlin	NASCAR Rookie of the Year; 1984	Succeeded by Ken Schrader
