= Dorsey Schroeder =

American racing driver

- Nationality: (United States) American
- Born: Dorsey Alan Schroeder; February 5, 1953 (age 73) Kirkwood, Missouri, U.S.

United SportsCar Championship career
- Debut season: 2015
- Current team: Highway to Help
- Categorisation: FIA Bronze
- Car number: 50
- Engine: Dinan (BMW) 5.0 L V8
- Co-driver: Jim Pace; David Hinton; Byron DeFoor; Doug Smith
- Starts: 2

Previous series
- 1999–2002 1998–2002 1996–1998 1993–1993, 1996–1997, 2001 1990–1991 1990–1991: American Le Mans Series; Rolex Sports Car Series; NASCAR Craftsman Truck Series; NASCAR Winston Cup Series; International Race of Champions; ARCA Racing Series

NASCAR Cup Series career
- 9 races run over 6 years
- Best finish: 55th (1996)
- First race: 1991 Bud at The Glen (Watkins Glen)
- Last race: 2001 Dodge/Save Mart 350 (Sears Point)
Wins	Top tens	Poles
0	0	0

NASCAR FedEx Freight Truck Series career
- 4 races run over 3 years
- Best finish: 76th (1997)
- First race: 1996 Kragen 151 (Sears Point)
- Last race: 1998 Parts America 150 (Watkins Glen)
Wins	Top tens	Poles
0	1	0

Dorsey Alan Schroeder (born February 5, 1953) is an American race car driver. Since August 2015, he has served as Race Director for the Pirelli World Challenge series and since 2018 Race Director for the Trans Am Series presented by Pirelli SCCA Pro Racing. Over the course of his career in Sports car racing, he has won 40 professional races in 242 starts, including seventeen Trans-Am series wins. He also oversees the competition on-track at HSR events and enjoys racing vintage cars.

== Early life ==
As the son of a car dealer, Schroeder grew up around automobiles and received his first (wrecked) car from his father at the age of fourteen, and was expected to do his own repairs over the next two years.

== Racing career ==
In 1971, at the age of nineteen, he became the first person under the age of 21 to be issued an SCCA National competition license.

Schroeder was a successful sports car driver throughout the 1990s in the Trans-Am series, winning the championship with Roush Racing as a rookie in the 1989 Trans-Am Series with six wins. In 1990, he was named IMSA GT Championship GTO class champion with three wins. Between 1998 and 2002, he also competed in Grand-Am and American Le Mans series events, recording a win at Mid-Ohio in 1998 for Dyson Racing. In recent years, Schroeder has competed in IMSA WeatherTech SportsCar Championship races at Daytona and Sebring in the Prototype class.

Schroeder competed in IROC in 1990 representing the SCCA Trans-Am Series and 1991 representing IMSA Camel GT. He finished 7th in IROC XIV and 12th in IROC XV.

Schroeder was also known as a NASCAR "road course ringer," making nine Winston Cup series starts between 1991 and 2001.

Schroeder served as a color analyst for Fox Sports 1's coverage of the United SportsCar Championship and was previously a color analyst for Speed Channel's television broadcast of the Rolex Sports Car Series and American Le Mans Series.

== Personal life ==
Schroeder currently lives in Florida with his wife Kim and daughter Carissa Schroeder from his second marriage. He used to own a seasonal restaurant in Osage Beach, Missouri, called "Dorsey's Pit Stop" until it caught fire.

== Motorsports career results ==
=== SCCA National Championship Runoffs ===
Year	Track	Car	Engine	Class	Finish	Start	Status
1974	Road Atlanta	Brabham BT35	Cosworth	Formula B	5	8	Running
1976	Road Atlanta	March	Cosworth	Formula B	6	4	Running
1977	Road Atlanta	March 75B	Cosworth	Formula B	16	7	Running
1978	Road Atlanta	Nissan 610	Nissan	B Sedan	21	6	Running
1979	Road Atlanta	Nissan 610	Nissan	B Sedan	4	7	Running
1980	Road Atlanta	Nissan 610	Nissan	GT2	22	12	Retired
1982	Road Atlanta	March 75B	Cosworth	Formula Atlantic	14		Retired
1985	Road Atlanta	Spec Racer	Renault	Spec Racer Renault	2	1	Running
1986	Road Atlanta	Spec Racer	Renault	Spec Racer Renault	30	4	Retired

=== NASCAR ===
(key) (Bold – Pole position awarded by qualifying time. Italics – Pole position earned by points standings or practice time. * – Most laps led.)

==== Winston Cup Series ====
NASCAR Winston Cup Series results
Year	Team	No.	Make	1	2	3	4	5	6	7	8	9	10	11	12	13	14	15	16	17	18	19	20	21	22	23	24	25	26	27	28	29	30	31	32	33	34	35	36	NWCC	Pts	Ref
1991	Compton Racing	69	Ford	DAY; DNQ	RCH	CAR	ATL	DAR	BRI	NWS	MAR	TAL	CLT	DOV	SON	POC	MCH	DAY	POC	TAL																				59th	157	
1991	Team III Racing	24	Pontiac																		GLN; 17	MCH	BRI	DAR	RCH	DOV	MAR	NWS												59th	157	
1991	Cale Yarborough Motorsports	66	Pontiac																										CLT; 41	CAR	PHO	ATL								59th	157	
1992	Donlavey Racing	90	Ford	DAY; 19	CAR	RCH																																		60th	164	
1992	Melling Racing	9	Ford				ATL; 35	DAR	BRI	NWS	MAR	TAL	CLT	DOV	SON	POC	MCH	DAY	POC	TAL	GLN	MCH	BRI	DAR	RCH	DOV	MAR	NWS	CLT	CAR	PHO	ATL								60th	164	
1993	Mansion Motorsports	85	Ford	DAY; DNQ	CAR	RCH	ATL	DAR	BRI	NWS	MAR	TAL																												62nd	113	
1993	Tri-Star Motorsports	68	Ford										SON; 33	CLT	DOV	POC	MCH	DAY	NHA	POC	TAL	GLN; 38	MCH	BRI	DAR	RCH	DOV	MAR	NWS	CLT	CAR	PHO	ATL							62nd	113	
1996	Bill Elliott Racing	94	Ford	DAY	CAR	RCH	ATL	DAR	BRI	NWS	MAR	TAL	SON	CLT	DOV	POC	MCH	DAY	NHA	POC	TAL	IND	GLN; 13	MCH	BRI	DAR	RCH	DOV	MAR	NWS	CLT	CAR	PHO	ATL						55th	129	
1997	Donlavey Racing	90	Ford	DAY	CAR	RCH	ATL	DAR	TEX	BRI	MAR	SON	TAL	CLT	DOV	POC	MCH	CAL	DAY	NHA	POC	IND	GLN; 31	MCH	BRI	DAR	RCH	NHA	DOV	MAR	CLT	TAL	CAR	PHO	ATL					62nd	70	
2001	Chip Ganassi Racing	01	Dodge	DAY	CAR	LVS	ATL	DAR	BRI	TEX	MAR	TAL	CAL	RCH	CLT	DOV	MCH	POC	SON; 25	DAY	CHI	NHA	POC	IND	GLN	MCH	BRI	DAR	RCH	DOV	KAN	CLT	MAR	TAL	PHO	CAR	HOM	ATL	NHA	62nd	88	

===== Daytona 500 results =====
Year	Team	Manufacturer	Start	Finish
1991	Compton Racing	Ford	DNQ	
1992	Donlavey Racing	Ford	31	19
1993	Mansion Motorsports	Ford	DNQ	

==== Craftsman Truck Series ====
NASCAR Craftsman Truck Series results
Year	Team	No.	Make	1	2	3	4	5	6	7	8	9	10	11	12	13	14	15	16	17	18	19	20	21	22	23	24	25	26	27	NCTC	Pts	Ref
1996	Liberty Racing	98	Ford	HOM	PHO	POR	EVG	TUS	CNS	HPT	BRI	NZH	MLW	LVL	I70	IRP	FLM	GLN	NSV	RCH	NHA	MAR	NWS	SON; 21	MMR	PHO	LVS				106th	100	
1997	Gloy-Rahal Racing	55	Ford	WDW	TUS	HOM	PHO	POR	EVG	I70	NHA	TEX	BRI	NZH	MLW	LVL	CNS	HPT; 4	IRP	FLM	NSV	GLN; 27	RCH	MAR	SON	MMR	CAL	PHO	LVS		76th	242	
1998	Gloy-Rahal Racing	55	Ford	WDW	HOM	PHO	POR	EVG	I70	GLN; 13	TEX	BRI	MLW	NZH	CAL	PPR	IRP	NHA	FLM	NSV	HPT	LVL	RCH	MEM	GTY	MAR	SON	MMR	PHO	LVS	85th	124	

=== International Race of Champions ===
(key) (Bold – Pole position. * – Most laps led.)

International Race of Champions results
Season	Make	1	2	3	4	Pos.	Points	Ref
1990	Dodge	TAL; 6	CLE; 10	MCH; 4		7th	26	
1991	Dodge	DAY; 9	TAL; 11	MCH; 11	GLN; 6	12th	16	

=== WeatherTech SportsCar Championship ===
(key) (Races in bold indicate pole position) (Races in italics indicate fastest lap)

Year	Team	Class	Make	Engine	1	2	3	4	5	6	7	8	9	10	Pos.	Points
2015	Highway to Help	P	Riley Mk XXVI DP	Dinan (BMW) 5.0 L V8	DAY; 8	SEB; 7	LBH	LGA	DET	WGL	MOS	ELK	COA	PET	19th	49
2016	Highway to Help	P	Riley Mk XXVI DP	Dinan (BMW) 5.0 L V8	DAY; 8	SEB; 10	LBH	LGA	DET	WGL; DNS	MOS	ELK	COA	PET	25th	46

^{*} Season still in progress.
