= 1989 The Winston =

Fifth iteration of the NASCAR All-Star Race

Race details
- Race 2 of 2 exhibition races in the 1989 NASCAR Winston Cup Series
- Date: May 21, 1989
- Location: Concord, North Carolina
- Course: Charlotte Motor Speedway
- Course length: 1.5 miles (2.4 km)
- Distance: 135 laps, 202.5 mi (324 km)
- Weather: Temperatures around 82 °F (28 °C), with 72% humidity and winds gusting to 10 miles per hour (16 km/h), partly sunny with 20% chance of rain
- Average speed: 133.15 mph (214.28 km/h)

Pole position
| Driver | Terry Labonte | Junior Johnson & Associates |

Most laps led
| Driver | Rusty Wallace | Blue Max Racing |
- Laps: 69

Winner
| No. 27 | Rusty Wallace | Blue Max Racing |

Television in the United States
- Network: ABC
- Announcers: Paul Page, Benny Parsons, and Bobby Unser

The 1989 edition of The Winston was a stock car racing competition that took place on May 21, 1989. Held at Charlotte Motor Speedway in Concord, North Carolina, the 135-lap race was an exhibition race in the 1989 NASCAR Winston Cup Series. Terry Labonte of Junior Johnson & Associates won the pole, but it was Rusty Wallace of Blue Max Racing who led the most laps (69) and won the race to collect US$240,000 after spinning Darrell Waltrip of Hendrick Motorsports out before the final lap.

== Background ==
Charlotte Motor Speedway, the track where the race was held.

The Winston was open to race winners from last season through the 1989 Winston 500 at Talladega Superspeedway. The winner of The Winston Open advanced to complete the starting grid. Because the field did not meet the minimum requirement of 19 cars, the remaining spots were awarded to the most recent winning drivers prior to the 1988 season.

=== 1989 The Winston drivers and eligibility ===
==== Race winners in 1988 and 1989 ====
- 3-Dale Earnhardt (4 wins from 1988 and 1989)
- 5-Geoff Bodine (1 win in 1988)
- 7-Alan Kulwicki (1 win in 1988)
- 9-Bill Elliott (6 wins in 1988)
- 11-Terry Labonte (1 win in 1988)
- 17-Darrell Waltrip (5 wins from 1988 and 1989, including the 1989 Daytona 500)
- 21-Neil Bonnett (2 wins in 1988)
- 25-Ken Schrader (1 win in 1988)
- 26-Ricky Rudd (1 win in 1988)
- 27-Rusty Wallace (9 wins from 1988 and 1989)
- 28-Davey Allison (2 wins in 1988)
- 33-Harry Gant (1 win in 1989)
- 55-Phil Parsons (1 win in 1988)
- 83-Lake Speed (1 win in 1988)

==== Race winners from previous years, not eligible by the above criteria ====
- 8-Bobby Hillin Jr. (1 win in 1986)
- 42-Kyle Petty (1 win in 1987)
- 43-Richard Petty (2 wins in 1984)
- 75-Morgan Shepherd (1 win in 1986)
- 88-Greg Sacks (1 win in 1985)

==== Winner of The Winston Open ====
- 94-Sterling Marlin

== Race summary ==
=== Race 1 (75 laps) ===
Terry Labonte won the pole while Dale Earnhardt took the outside pole. Sterling Marlin made the starting grid by winning the Winston Open for the second year in the row. Darrell Waltrip and Kyle Petty served as the onboard camera cars throughout the race. Upon the waving of the green flag, Labonte had a good start while Rusty Wallace challenged Earnhardt for second place, but Earnhardt gained momentum and overtook Labonte to lead the first lap. Wallace and Alan Kulwicki zipped past Labonte, who then started losing positions to Geoff Bodine and Waltrip by the second lap. As Wallace closed in on Earnhardt, the first caution flag waved after Kyle Petty crashed on the turn three wall and Richard Petty spun out of control; the younger Petty was rushed to the hospital with only minor bruises. Earnhardt was forced to restart at the back of the field after his right front tire was punctured by the debris. Wallace led the field with Kulwicki and Waltrip behind him while Davey Allison and Bill Elliott overtook Labonte and Earnhardt inched his way back in the top 10. In the end, Wallace took the checkered flag and collected US$20,000.

Race 1 results

1. 27-Rusty Wallace (US$20,000)
2. 17-Darrell Waltrip
3. 25-Ken Schrader
4. 3-Dale Earnhardt
5. 7-Alan Kulwicki

=== Race 2 (50 laps) ===
Wallace led the field on the single-line restart, but Waltrip passed him from the outside after the first three laps. Morgan Shepherd retired on lap 83 after his engine overheated. Waltrip won the 50-lap segment to collect US$20,000

Race 2 results

1. 17-Darrell Waltrip (US$20,000)
2. 27-Rusty Wallace
3. 25-Ken Schrader
4. 3-Dale Earnhardt
5. 7-Alan Kulwicki

=== Race 3 (10 laps) ===
Waltrip led the field in the 10-lap shootout. He continued his lead while Wallace closed in on him. With two laps to go, Wallace tapped Waltrip on the left rear, sending Waltrip spinning across the infield grass and triggering the caution. It was decided by NASCAR that the restart would be a two-lap dash, which Wallace won to collect a combined US$240,000, including the US$200,000 prize for the final segment.

After the race, a fight ensued between the pit crews of Wallace and Waltrip as Wallace made his way to Victory Lane. Furious over the outcome of the race, Waltrip commented: "I just hope he chokes on that $200,000. That's all I can say." Rusty would apologize post-race for the contact, but maintained that it was a racing accident. By mid-week, Wallace and Waltrip would settle their feud with a phone call, although Wallace would become the most unpopular driver of the season despite becoming the Winston Cup champion.

Race results
| Pos | Grid | Car | Driver | Owner | Manufacturer | Laps run | Laps led |
|---|---|---|---|---|---|---|---|
| 1 | 3 | 27 | Rusty Wallace | Blue Max Racing | Pontiac | 135 | 69 |
| 2 | 14 | 25 | Ken Schrader | Hendrick Motorsports | Chevrolet | 135 | 0 |
| 3 | 2 | 3 | Dale Earnhardt | Richard Childress Racing | Chevrolet | 135 | 7 |
| 4 | 9 | 9 | Bill Elliott | Melling Racing | Ford | 135 | 0 |
| 5 | 4 | 7 | Alan Kulwicki | AK Racing | Ford | 135 | 1 |
| 6 | 20 | 94 | Sterling Marlin | Hagan Racing | Oldsmobile | 135 | 0 |
| 7 | 7 | 17 | Darrell Waltrip | Hendrick Motorsports | Chevrolet | 135 | 54 |
| 8 | 13 | 26 | Ricky Rudd | King Racing | Buick | 135 | 0 |
| 9 | 5 | 5 | Geoff Bodine | Hendrick Motorsports | Chevrolet | 135 | 0 |
| 10 | 10 | 88 | Greg Sacks | Baker-Schiff Racing | Pontiac | 135 | 0 |
| 11 | 11 | 8 | Bobby Hillin Jr. | Stavola Brothers Racing | Buick | 135 | 0 |
| 12 | 8 | 28 | Davey Allison | Robert Yates Racing | Ford | 135 | 0 |
| 13 | 12 | 83 | Lake Speed | Speed Racing | Oldsmobile | 135 | 3 |
| 14 | 1 | 11 | Terry Labonte | Junior Johnson & Associates | Chevrolet | 135 | 1 |
| 15 | 6 | 21 | Neil Bonnett | Wood Brothers Racing | Ford | 135 | 0 |
| 16 | 19 | 43 | Richard Petty | Petty Enterprises | Pontiac | 134 | 0 |
| 17 | 15 | 33 | Harry Gant | Jackson Motorsports | Chevrolet | 134 | 0 |
| 18 | 16 | 55 | Phil Parsons | Jackson Motorsports | Oldsmobile | 133 | 0 |
| 19 | 18 | 75 | Morgan Shepherd | RahMoc Enterprises | Pontiac | 83 | 0 |
| 20 | 12 | 42 | Kyle Petty | SABCO Racing | Pontiac | 3 | 0 |
