= Gloy-Rahal Racing =

- Owner(s): Bobby Rahal; Tom Gloy
- Base: Mooresville, North Carolina
- Series: NASCAR Craftsman Truck Series
- Race drivers: Ernie Cope, Lance Hooper, Dave Rezendes, Dorsey Schroeder, Tony Roper, Ron Barfield Jr., Dennis Setzer, Boris Said, Butch Miller
- Manufacturer: Ford
- Opened: 1997
- Closed: 2000

Career
- Drivers' Championships: 0
- Race victories: 0

Gloy-Rahal Racing was a NASCAR team co-owned by Team Rahal owner Bobby Rahal and Tom Gloy Racing owner Tom Gloy. The team raced a Ford in the NASCAR Craftsman Truck Series part-time in 1997 and full-time in 1998 and 1999.

== Team history ==
Bobby Rahal and Tom Gloy raced together in the 1970s in Atlantic Championship. Rahal had better results than Gloy, with a runner-up finish in 1977.

In 1997, an alliance was made between Tom Gloy's Trans-Am team, Rahal and one of his CART sponsors, Textron Automotive, to have Mike Borkowski drive a Ford Mustang Cobra in that competition. Borkowski would go on to two wins in the final two races of the championship.

That same year, Tom Gloy took his team to compete in the NASCAR Craftsman Truck Series, under the name Gloy Racing. He used the number 55 and his truck was an unsponsored Ford F-150.

During the first three events it entered, the team failed to qualify in any. At Tucson, Lance Hooper was the driver, while at Homestead-Miami and Phoenix, Jim Bown was. Gloy Racing's first NASCAR race was at Evergeen, with Ron Barfield Jr. at the wheel, who qualified sixth and finished 12th. In the next race at Bristol, he started 7th and finished 29th due to a crash.

In the following races the team hired Dorsey Schroeder and he raced at Tokepa, finished fourth, the team' best result of the year. At Watkins Glen, he started second and finished 27th after an engine problem and led the team's first NASCAR lap.

After that race the team hired Dave Rezendes and he stayed on for the following races the team had scheduled that season. At Sonoma, Rezendes took the pole position and led 34 laps. He was first with 4 laps to go, but crashed and finished 21st.

After a transmission problem and a 30th-place finish at Mesa Marin for Razendes, Bobby Rahal joined Tom Gloy starting in the second to last race of the season at Phoenix and the team was renamed Gloy/Rahal Racing. Rahal also contributed on the sponsorship side, with the arrival of Icehouse Beer, a Miller Brewing Company beer. That same company, through Miller Lite, sponsored Bobby Rahal in CART.

Rahal explained that the idea of joining the NASCAR Craftsman Truck Series was that it served as preparation for entering the NASCAR Winston Cup Series, as he had intentions of competing in that competition in the future:

"Without question, Winston Cup has got to be the ultimate goal but we've got a lot to do right here and now before we even think about that. But at least this gets us in the environment and prepares us one way or the other."

At Phoenix, Rezendes started and finished 15th. While at the final 1997 season race in Las Vegas, Rezendes qualified 37th, in a qualifying field that had 62 trucks for only 40 spots for the race, and finished 32nd, out of the race.

In 1998, the team competed full-time in the category and started the year with Rezendes. In the first four race of the season, In the first four races, his best starting position was ninth at Phoenix and his best finish was ninth at Homestead-Miami. From the fifth race on, Rezendes did not continue with Gloy-Rahal Racing and the team looked for a new driver.

At Evergreen, the driver was Ernie Cope, who finished 24th, at I-70 Speedway it was Dennis Setzer, who finished 31st out of the race due to transmission problems. Dorsey Schroeder returned to the team the following race at Watkins Glen, finish 14th, and in Texas Setzer returned to the team with a 14th place.

From the ninth race on, Tony Roper was the driver of the #55 Ford for the remaining 19 events. His best finish was 4th at Memphis and his best result was a second-place at Indianapolis Raceway Park behind Jack Sprague, which would be the best finish in the team's history. Roper had 3 top 10 and only 1 top 5 that season with the team, and ended up 16th in the driver's championship.

For 1999, Gloy-Rahal Racing fired Roper in order to hire Ron Barfield Jr. his second stint with the team. In the opening race at Homestead, Barfield started fifth and led 29 laps, the first since Dave Rezendes at Sonoma in 1997. However, during a pit stop, the mechanics were unable to tighten all the lug nuts, and when Barfield returned to the pits to solve it, the jack was stuck, losing many positions. Even so, Barfield was moving up from 19th place to third, but finished the race 15th, after a crash in the final laps.

In the third race at Evergreen, Barfield led four laps, and was second for much of the race. Jack Sprague overtook him on the last lap, finishing third. However, until race 22 at Las Vegas Barfield earned 2 additional top 10 finishes at Pikes Peak and Nashville, where he led 24 laps. He also had 7 retirements, 5 due to crashes at Homestead, Mesa Marin, Memphis, Texas, and Nazareth.

The driver and team parted ways after that race in Las Vegas by mutual agreement. Ron was 18th in the driver's championship. For the last races of the year the team tapped Tony Roper again to run the truck at Louisville, where he started 11th and finished 18th. Then Boris Said was in Texas, where e started 28th and finished 34th due to a crash, and for the last race of the year in Fontana, the team hired Butch Miller, who started in the race in 13th position and finished 11th.

The Fontana race would be the last for the team, as it ceased operations. In 2000, the Gloy-Rahal Racing assets and equipment were sold to Jim Murphy, who would form Lefturn Motorsports.

== Complete NASCAR Craftsman Truck Series results ==
(key) (Bold – Pole position awarded by qualifying time. Italics – Pole position earned by points standings or practice time. * – Most laps led.)

=== NASCAR Craftsman Truck Series ===
Year	Driver	No.	Make	1	2	3	4	5	6	7	8	9	10	11	12	13	14	15	16	17	18	19	20	21	22	23	24	25	26	27
1997	Lance Hooper	55	Ford	WDW	TUS; DNQ																									
1997	Jim Bown	55	Ford			HOM; DNQ	PHO; DNQ	POR																						
1997	Ron Barfield Jr.	55	Ford						EVG; 12	I70	NHA	TEX	BRI; 29	NAZ	MLW	LVL	CNS													
1997	Dorsey Schroeder	55	Ford															HPT; 4	IRP	FLM	NSV	WGL; 27	RCH	MAR						
1997	Dave Rezendes	55	Ford																						**SON**; 21	MMR; 30	CAL	PHO; 15	LVS; 32	
1998	Dave Rezendes	55	Ford	WDW; 31	HOM; 9	PHO; 18	POR; 17																							
1998	Ernie Cope	55	Ford					EVG; 24																						
1998	Dennis Setzer	55	Ford						I70; 31		TEX; 14																			
1998	Dorsey Schroeder	55	Ford							WGL; 13																				
1998	Tony Roper	55	Ford									BRI; 15	MLW; 18	NAZ; 12	CAL; 18	PPR; 10	IRP; 2	NHA; 36	FLM; 14	NSV; 21	HPT; 24	LVL; 6	RCH; 13	MEM; 17	GTY; 15	MAR; 18	SON; 12	MMR; 16	PHO; 25	LVS; 38
1999	Ron Barfield Jr.	55	Ford	HOM; 15	PHO; 21	EVG; 3	MMR; 29	MAR; 24	MEM; 31	PPR; 7	I70; 19	BRI; 11	TEX; 18	PIR; 18	WGL; 14	MLW; 11	NSV; 7	NAZ; 26	MCH; 17	NHA; 14	IRP; 13	GTY; 13	HPT; 28	RCH; 18	LVS; 29					
1999	Tony Roper	55	Ford																							LVL; 18				
1999	Boris Said	55	Ford																								TEX; 34			
1999	Butch Miller	55	Ford																									CAL; 11		
