= Ron Barfield Jr. =

American racing driver (born 1971)

Ronald Barfield II
- Born: April 20, 1971 (age 55); Florence, South Carolina, U.S.
- Awards: 1987 World Karting Association National Dirt Series Championship; 1994 Texas Pete All-Pro Series Rookie of the Year

NASCAR Cup Series career
- 1 race run over 1 year
- Best finish: 59th (1997)
- First race: 1997 Brickyard 400 (Indianapolis)
Wins	Top tens	Poles
0	0	0

NASCAR O'Reilly Auto Parts Series career
- 29 races run over 4 years
- Best finish: 37th (1997)
- First race: 1996 GM Goodwrench/Delco 200 (Dover)
- Last race: 2003 Funai 250 (Richmond)
Wins	Top tens	Poles
0	2	0

NASCAR FedEx Freight Truck Series career
- 71 races run over 6 years
- Best finish: 9th (1998)
- First race: 1996 Florida Dodge Dealers 400 (Homestead)
- Last race: 2001 Darlington 200 (Darlington)
Wins	Top tens	Poles
0	17	0

Ron Barfield Jr. (born April 20, 1971) is an American former stock car racing driver. He raced in all of the major NASCAR series, those being the Winston Cup Series, Busch Series, and Craftsman Truck Series, but did not win a race. He is a former protégé of Bill Elliott.

== Beginnings ==
Barfield began racing at the age of six in go-karts. In 1987, he won the World Karting Association's National Dirt Series Championship. Two years later, he switched to stock car racing and won nine races in a Late Model at Myrtle Beach Speedway. He would win the track championship at Myrtle Beach in 1991, collecting a total of 46 feature wins. In 1994, he was named the Texas Pete All-Pro Series Rookie of the Year, finishing fourth in points.

== Early NASCAR ==
In 1995, Barfield moved to the Slim Jim All Pro Series, where he won two races and had sixteen top-ten starts in twenty-one starts. The next season, he began racing in the major NASCAR series. He made his debut in the Truck Series at Homestead-Miami Speedway, driving the No. 94 for Super 8 Motel Ford F-150 for Elliott, starting third and finishing fourth. He ran six more races in the trucks that season and had two additional top-ten finishes. He also ran six races in the Busch Series for Elliott's New Holland team, where his best finish was eleventh. In addition, Barfield attempted the Brickyard 400 in the Cup series, but failed to qualify. He took home a victory at Michigan International Speedway in an Auto Racing Club of America as well.

Barfield returned to the trucks for another part-time run in 1997, finishing eighth at Walt Disney World Speedway. He also attempted to run in the Busch Series full-time with Elliott's team, and posted two ninth-place runs, but his schedule was eventually cut back. He ran two more truck races for Gloy-Rahal Racing, before rounding out the schedule in a team owned by Elliott's partner, Charles Hardy. He also attempted again at Indianapolis in the Cup series, where he finished 22nd.

In 1998, Barfield went full-time with the Hardy team, with sponsorship from Ortho Lawn & Garden. He had ten top-tens and finished ninth in points. He also ran a pair of races in the No. 2 for Craven, his best finish a 21st at Bristol.

== Final years ==
Despite the success of 1998, Hardy's team closed its doors, and Barfield return to Gloy to pilot the No. 55 Icehouse Beer Ford. He had two top-tens but was released late in the year, and finished the season driving for Rick McCray. He started 2000 driving for his own team, but ran four more races, his worst finish a 27th. He made his final truck start the following year at Darlington Raceway, finishing 22nd in a truck owned by Team 23 Racing. After not racing in 2002, Barfield made seven Busch starts in 2003, the first five in a car owned by Stanton Barrett. After running two more races in the #73 car, Barfield disappeared from the NASCAR circuit.

Barfield now runs a racing shop in Timmonsville, SC and in 2006, purchased an overgrown site that once was the site of a four-tenths mile dirt track in nearby Dillon (1966-73, 1977-80). Barfield rebuilt the track, paving it, where today it runs as the Dillon Motor Speedway, hosting local and national (PASS) (Super) Late Models.

== Motorsports career results ==
=== NASCAR ===
(key) (Bold – Pole position awarded by qualifying time. Italics – Pole position earned by points standings or practice time. * – Most laps led.)

==== Winston Cup Series ====
NASCAR Winston Cup Series results
Year	Team	No.	Make	1	2	3	4	5	6	7	8	9	10	11	12	13	14	15	16	17	18	19	20	21	22	23	24	25	26	27	28	29	30	31	32	NWCC	Pts	Ref
1996	Elliott-Hardy Racing	94	Ford	DAY	CAR	RCH	ATL	DAR	BRI	NWS	MAR	TAL	SON	CLT	DOV	POC	MCH; QL^{†}	DAY	NHA	POC	TAL															NA	-	
1996	Bill Elliott Racing	91	Ford																			IND; DNQ	GLN	MCH	BRI	DAR	RCH	DOV	MAR	NWS	CLT	CAR	PHO			NA	-	
1996	David Blair Motorsports	27	Ford																															ATL; DNQ		NA	-	
1997	Bill Elliott Racing	92	Ford	DAY	CAR	RCH	ATL	DAR	TEX	BRI	MAR	SON	TAL	CLT	DOV	POC	MCH	CAL	DAY	NHA	POC	IND; 22	GLN	MCH	BRI	DAR	RCH	NHA	DOV	MAR	CLT	TAL	CAR	PHO	ATL	59th	97	
^{†} - Qualified for Todd Bodine

==== Busch Series ====
NASCAR Busch Series results
Year	Team	No.	Make	1	2	3	4	5	6	7	8	9	10	11	12	13	14	15	16	17	18	19	20	21	22	23	24	25	26	27	28	29	30	31	32	33	34	NBSC	Pts	Ref
1996	Bill Elliott Racing	94	Ford	DAY	CAR	RCH	ATL	NSV	DAR	BRI	HCY	NZH	CLT; DNQ	DOV; 23	SBO	MYB	GLN	MLW	NHA	TAL; DNQ	IRP	MCH; DNQ	BRI	DAR; 28	RCH; 37	DOV; 13	CLT; 11	CAR; 41	HOM									53rd	519	
1997	Bill Elliott Racing	94	Ford	DAY; DNQ	CAR; 19	RCH; 9	ATL; 20	LVS; 38	DAR; 13	HCY	TEX; 25	BRI; 39	NSV	TAL; 9	NHA	NZH	CLT; 23	DOV; 22	SBO	GLN	MLW	MYB	GTY	IRP	MCH; DNQ	BRI; 24	DAR; 16	RCH; DNQ	DOV; 29	CLT; DNQ	CAL; 22	CAR	HOM					37th	1362	
1998	RC Racing	2	Chevy	DAY; DNQ	CAR	LVS; DNQ	NSV	DAR; DNQ	BRI; 21	TEX	HCY	TAL	NHA	NZH	CLT	DOV	RCH	PPR	GLN	MLW	MYB	CAL; 28	SBO	IRP	MCH	BRI	DAR; DNQ	RCH	DOV	CLT	GTY	CAR	ATL	HOM				107th	79	
2003	Stanton Barrett Motorsports	91	Ford	DAY	CAR	LVS	DAR; 21	BRI	TEX	TAL	NSH	CAL	RCH	GTY	NZH; 32	CLT	DOV; 39	NSH	KEN	MLW; 41	DAY	CHI	NHA; 30	PPR	IRP	MCH	BRI											69th	472	
2003	Havill-Spoerl Racing	73	Ford																									DAR; 35	RCH; 25	DOV	KAN	CLT	MEM	ATL	PHO	CAR	HOM	69th	472	
2004	Stanton Barrett Motorsports	97	Ford	DAY	CAR	LVS	DAR	BRI	TEX	NSH	TAL	CAL	GTY	RCH	NZH	CLT	DOV	NSH	KEN	MLW	DAY	CHI	NHA	PPR; DNQ	IRP	MCH	BRI	CAL	RCH	DOV	KAN	CLT	MEM	ATL	PHO	DAR	HOM	NA	-	

==== Craftsman Truck Series ====
NASCAR Craftsman Truck Series results
Year	Team	No.	Make	1	2	3	4	5	6	7	8	9	10	11	12	13	14	15	16	17	18	19	20	21	22	23	24	25	26	27	NCTC	Pts	Ref
1996	Bill Elliott Racing	94	Ford	HOM; 4	PHO; 8	POR; 11	EVG; 9	TUS	CNS	HPT	BRI	NZH	MLW; 28	LVL	I70	IRP	FLM	GLN	NSV	RCH	NHA	MAR	NWS	SON	MMR	PHO; 27	LVS; 19				29th	837	
1997	Bill Elliott Racing	94	Ford	WDW; 8	TUS	HOM	PHO	POR																							39th	618	
1997	Gloy/Rahal Racing	55	Ford						EVG; 12	I70	NHA	TEX	BRI; 29	NZH	MLW	LVL	CNS	HPT	IRP	FLM	NSV	GLN	RCH	MAR	SON	MMR					39th	618	
1997	Charles Hardy Racing	35	Chevy																								CAL; 19	PHO; 27	LVS; 26		39th	618	
1998	Charles Hardy Racing	35	Chevy	WDW; 22	HOM; 5	PHO; 21	POR; 18	EVG; 9	I70; 12	GLN; 23	TEX; 30	BRI; 7	MLW; 9	NZH; 20	CAL; 28	PPR; 13	IRP; 9	NHA; 4	FLM; 7	NSV; 10	HPT; 16	LVL; 11	RCH; 30	MEM; 6	GTY; 14	MAR; 20	SON; 13	MMR; 23	PHO; 15	LVS; 9	9th	3227	
1999	Gloy/Rahal Racing	55	Ford	HOM; 15	PHO; 21	EVG; 3	MMR; 29	MAR; 24	MEM; 31	PPR; 7	I70; 19	BRI; 11	TEX; 18	PIR; 18	GLN; 14	MLW; 11	NSV; 7	NZH; 26	MCH; 17	NHA; 14	IRP; 13	GTY; 13	HPT; 28	RCH; 18	LVS; 29						17th	2743	
1999	McCray Racing	40	Chevy																							LVL; 17					17th	2743	
1999	McCray Racing	42	Chevy																								TEX; 33	CAL; 21			17th	2743	
2000	RDR Racing	97	Ford	DAY; 17	HOM	PHO	MMR	MAR	PIR	GTY															DOV; DNQ	TEX; DNQ	CAL				44th	501	
2000	Nessa Motorsports	28	Ford								MEM; 27	PPR	EVG	TEX	KEN; 21	GLN	MLW	NHA	NZH	MCH											44th	501	
2000	Black Tip Racing	69	Chevy																		IRP; 20										44th	501	
2000	Nessa Motorsports	8	Ford																			NSV; 20	CIC	RCH							44th	501	
2001	Team 23 Racing	23	Chevy	DAY	HOM	MMR	MAR	GTY	DAR; 22	PPR	DOV	TEX	MEM	MLW	KAN	KEN	NHA	IRP	NSH	CIC	NZH	RCH	SBO	TEX	LVS	PHO	CAL				99th	97	
2002	Kelvin Locklear	97	Ford	DAY; DNQ	DAR; DNQ	MAR	GTY	PPR	DOV	TEX	MEM	MLW	KAN	KEN	NHA	MCH	IRP	NSH	RCH	TEX	SBO	LVS	CAL	PHO	HOM						NA	-	

==== Winston West Series ====
NASCAR Winston West Series results
Year	Team	No.	Make	1	2	3	4	5	6	7	8	9	10	11	12	13	14	Pos.	Pts	Ref
1999	RDR Racing	92	Ford	TUS	LVS	PHO	CAL	PPR	MMR	IRW	EVG	POR	IRW	RMR	LVS	MMR	MOT; 12	66th	127	

=== ARCA Bondo/Mar-Hyde Series ===
(key) (Bold – Pole position awarded by qualifying time. Italics – Pole position earned by points standings or practice time. * – Most laps led.)

ARCA Bondo/Mar-Hyde Series results
Year	Team	No.	Make	1	2	3	4	5	6	7	8	9	10	11	12	13	14	15	16	17	18	19	20	21	22	23	24	25	ABMSC	Pts	Ref
1996	Bill Elliott Racing	94	Ford	DAY; 5	ATL; 4	SLM	TAL; 32	FIF	LVL	CLT; 38	CLT	KIL	FRS	POC; 3	MCH; 1	FRS	TOL	POC; 2	MCH	INF	SBS	ISF	DSF	KIL	SLM	WIN	**CLT**; 3	ATL; 24	24th	-	
1997	Bill Elliott Racing	94	Ford	DAY; 2	ATL	SLM	CLT	CLT	POC	MCH	SBS	TOL	KIL	FRS	MIN	POC	MCH	DSF	GTW	SLM	WIN	CLT	TAL	ISF	ATL				121st	-	
1998	RC Racing	2	Ford	DAY; 5	ATL	SLM																							NA	0	
1998	RC Racing	2	Chevy				CLT; 4	MEM	MCH; 16	POC	SBS	TOL	PPR	POC	KIL	FRS	ISF	ATL	DSF	SLM	TEX	WIN	CLT	TAL	ATL				NA	0	
1999	RDR Racing	92	Ford	DAY; 6	ATL	SLM	AND	CLT	MCH	POC	TOL	SBS	BLN	POC	KIL	FRS	FLM	ISF	WIN	DSF	SLM	CLT	TAL	ATL					89th	200	
