= Rahal Letterman Lanigan Racing =

American auto racing team

- Owner(s): Bobby Rahal; David Letterman; Mike Lanigan
- Principal(s): Jay Frye (president); Brian Barnhart (SVP, operations); Ricardo Nault (VP, operations)
- Base: Zionsville, Indiana
- Series: IndyCar Series
- Race drivers: 15. (United States) Graham Rahal; 45. (United Kingdom) Louis Foster
- Manufacturer: Honda
- Opened: 1992

Career
- Drivers' Championships: 1 (1992 CART)
- Indy 500 victories: 2 (2004, 2020)
- Race victories: 25
- Pole positions: 31

(United States) RLL Team McLaren
- Team principal(s): Piers Phillips (President); Steve Dickson (General Manager); Brandon Fry (Technical/Race Operations Director)
- Current series: WeatherTech SportsCar Championship
- Former series: American Le Mans Series
- Current drivers: 59. (United States) Max Esterson; (United Kingdom) Dean MacDonald (Estonia) Jüri Vips
- Website: http://www.rahal.com

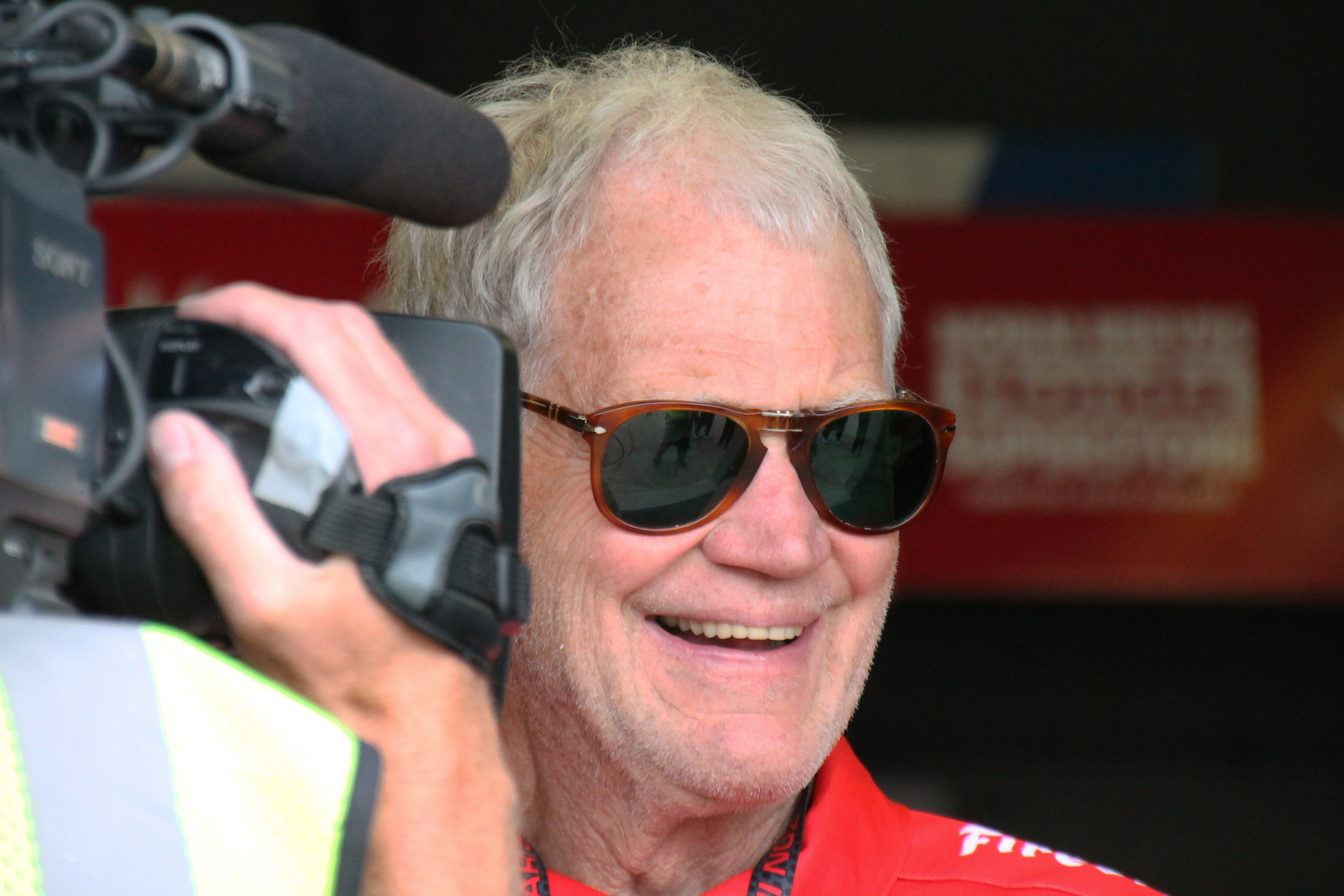
Team co-owner David Letterman at the 2015 Indianapolis 500

Rahal Letterman Lanigan Racing (RLL) is an auto racing team that has participated in the IndyCar Series and the WeatherTech SportsCar Championship. Headquartered in Zionsville, Indiana and Hilliard, Ohio, it is co-owned by 1986 Indianapolis 500 winner Bobby Rahal, former television talk show host David Letterman, and businessman Mike Lanigan. The team won the 1992 CART Indy Car championship, and has won the Indianapolis 500 twice, first in 2004 with Buddy Rice and 2020 with Takuma Sato.

The team was established in late 1991 when driver Bobby Rahal and business partner Carl Hogan purchased the distressed Patrick Racing team from U.E. "Pat" Patrick. Originally named Rahal-Hogan Racing, it was changed to Team Rahal in 1996 when Hogan left to form his own team. David Letterman purchased a minority interest in the team in 1996, and the team went by the name of Rahal Letterman Racing from May 2004 until December 2010.

Throughout the team's history in IMSA with factory partner BMW, the sports car division of the team has run under the name BMW Team RLL.

In 2024, the team was investigated by the Federal Bureau of Investigation for unspecified reasons. The investigation is still ongoing.

Rahal Letterman Lanigan Racing is Honda's longest-tenured continuous IndyCar team partner, having used Honda engines continuously since renewing the partnership in 2003, while many other IndyCar teams have changed engine suppliers over the years.

== CART Indy Car series ==
Following the 1991 CART season, Bobby Rahal left the Galles-Kraco Racing team. Despite consistent top finishes, Rahal won only two races between 1989 and 1991. Likewise, Danny Sullivan left the Patrick Racing team, following a dismal season with the Alfa Romeo engine. The two drivers essentially swapped rides. Rahal signed with Patrick in September 1991, and Sullivan took to Rahal's old seat at Galles-Kraco Racing.

In late 1991, Patrick Racing found itself in financial and legal trouble. Rumors surfaced that the Patrick team had shipped one of the Ilmor Chevrolet V-8 engines over to the Alfa Romeo engine developers in Italy, who in turn, tore the engine down to examine it and allegedly stole design ideas. It was returned in pieces and infuriated Ilmor officials.

By this time, Patrick's contractual obligations with Alfa Romeo had ended, so the team attempted to re-sign with Ilmor, or possibly acquire older Ilmor engines from Newman/Haas. The Newman/Haas team was in the process of switching to the new Ford-Cosworth XB for 1992. Due to the possible fraudulent actions by Patrick against Ilmor, the team was refused an Ilmor Chevrolet engine lease, despite inking the popular Rahal. According to Rahal, he had a clause in his contract, as did Miller, which required the team field the Ilmor-Chevrolet engine. Facing a decidedly uncompetitive powerplant situation for 1992, and escalating legal problems, in December 1991, Patrick sold the team outright to Bobby Rahal and his new partner Carl Hogan. Together they formed Rahal-Hogan Racing. They retained nearly all of the employees and key personnel (including Jim McGee, Steve Newey, Scott Roembke, and others), kept the sponsorship from Miller Genuine Draft, and were able to re-secure the Ilmor Chevrolet engine lease. According to Rahal, the transition was simple and smooth enough that they simply "took [the] Patrick Racing sign off the front of the building and put...Rahal-Hogan".

=== 1992 ===
In 1992, the team won the CART championship on their first try, with owner-driver Bobby Rahal fielding a "tried and true" Lola T92/00-Chevy "A" to four victories and three poles during the season. It was Rahal's third points championship as a driver. Rahal's three oval wins included a dominating wire-to-wire victory at Phoenix, where he led all 200 laps. His other wins came at Detroit, Loudon, and Nazareth. He finished 6th at the Indianapolis 500, but dropped out of the Michigan 500. He notched 12 top-ten finishes, and clinched the championship by a mere 4 points, after finishing third at Laguna Seca.

It was the fifth consecutive (and final) championship for the Ilmor Chevy "A" engine. Rahal managed to outperform the newer engines that joined the series in 1992, the Ford/Cosworth XB, as well as the Ilmor Chevy "B" engine, which was used exclusively by Penske. For the third time, Michael Andretti finished runner-up to Rahal in the points. Andretti promptly left Indy car racing the following year to race in Formula One.

=== 1993 ===
In late 1992, Rahal-Hogan Racing absorbed the Truesports racing team, where Rahal had started his CART career. The team moved its headquarters from Indianapolis to Hilliard, into the old Truesports facility. Along with the acquisition, they took over the two-year-old Truesports "All-American" chassis program. Rahal started the 1993 season with an updated version of the Truesports chassis, now designated the R/H-001, powered by the newer Ilmor Chevy "C" engine. The intention was to introduce a brand-new R/H chassis by August of that year.

A second-place finish at Long Beach offered some promise for the chassis. The success was short-lived, however, as the chassis proved uncompetitive on ovals and superspeedways. Rahal failed to qualify at Indianapolis; he was bumped with 15 minutes left in the day. Following Indy, the team switched Rahal to a more conventional Lola T93/00. Rahal rebounded, with 11 top-tens in the final 12 races - good enough for 4th place in the final points standings.

Mike Groff joined the team as a test driver and raced a second car on a partial schedule. After the team's failure at Indy, Groff made four additional starts in the R/H-001. By season's end, the team abandoned the in-house chassis project.

=== 1994–1995 ===
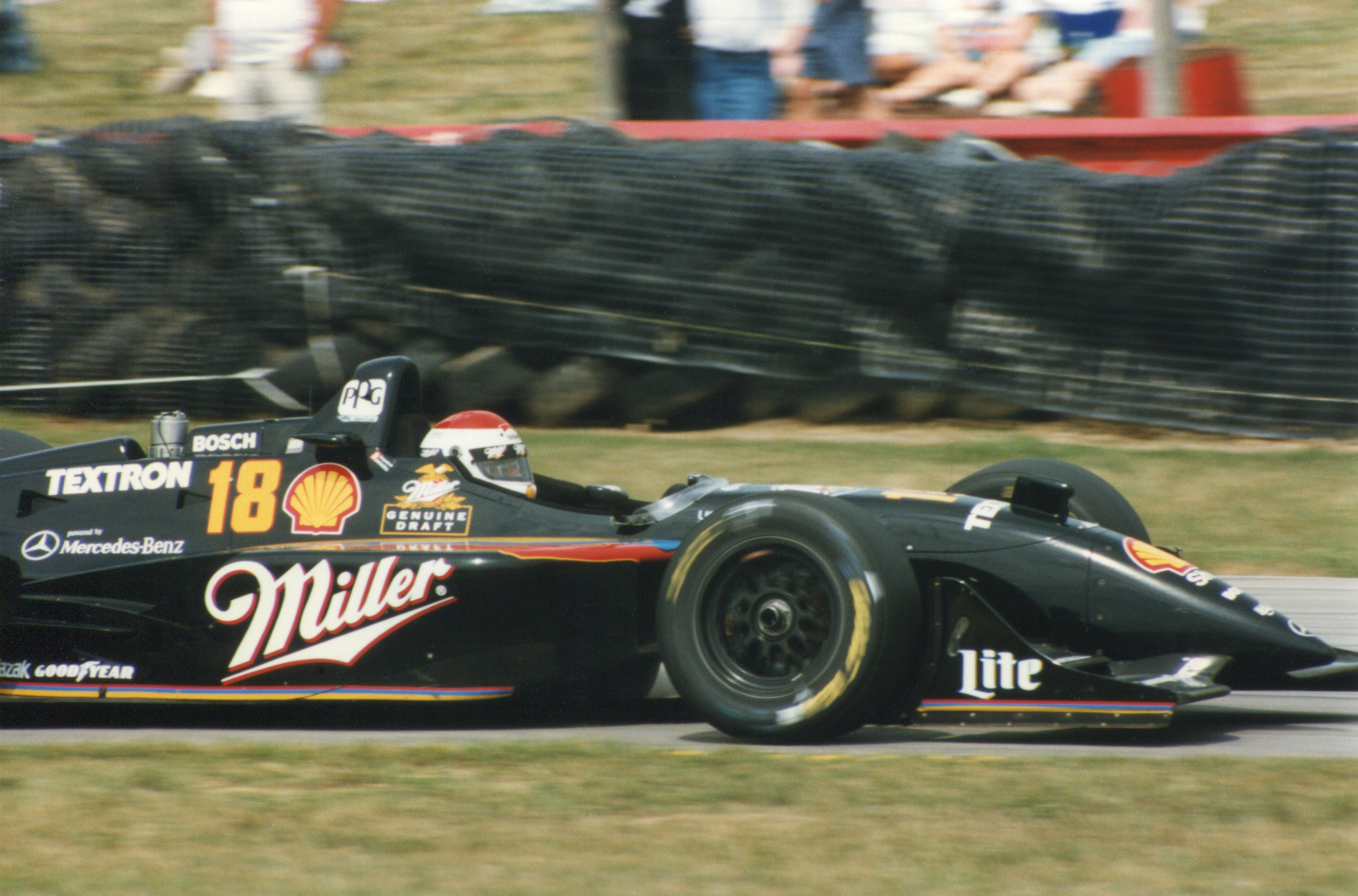
Rahal at Mid-Ohio in 1996.

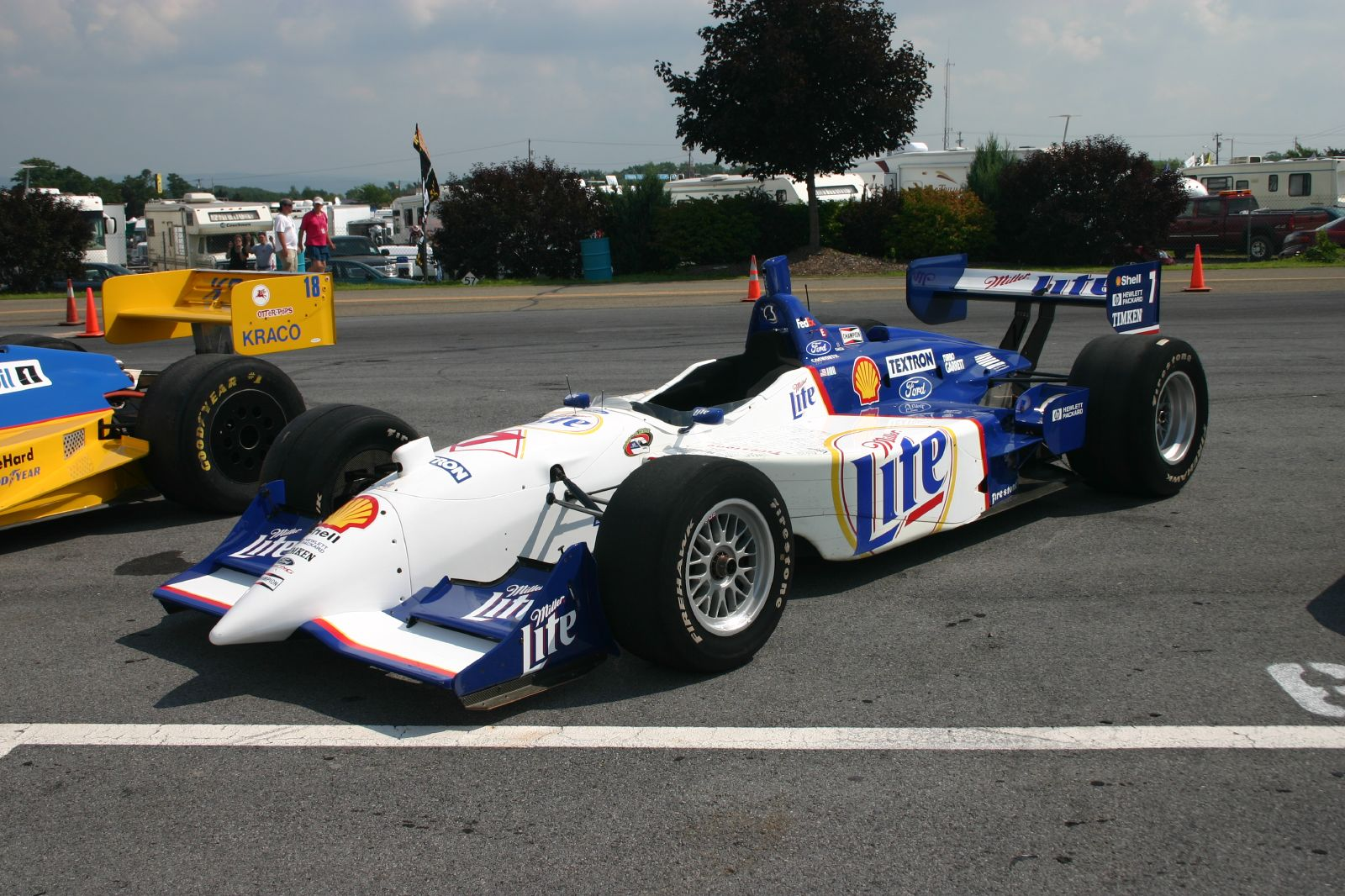
Rahal "Last Ride" car from 1998 season.

Rahal-Hogan Racing introduced the full-works Honda HRX Indy V-8t engine to IndyCar racing in 1994, after performing development testing for the powerplant throughout 1993. The team operated as a two-car outfit, promoting Mike Groff to a full-time schedule for 1994. The team fielded the Lola T94/00 chassis as well as received a full-factory support from Honda.

The first generation iron block Honda powerplants, however, were still underdeveloped. At the 1994 Indianapolis 500, both Rahal and Groff were at the bottom of the speed charts, and the team was at risk of failing to qualifying at Indy for the second year in a row. On the second weekend of time trials, both Rahal and Groff withdrew their Honda-powered machines, and re-qualified using two PC-22-Ilmors loaned from Penske. Rahal finished a strong 3rd in the race with the borrow chassis.

Rahal and Groff finished out the rest of the 1994 season with the Honda, however, the results were largely disappointing. Rahal notched only one top five driving the Honda, and placed tenth in the season points standings. Unsatisfied with the lack of progress and growing pains with the Honda engine, Rahal-Hogan Racing announced they were cutting ties with Honda at the end of the season.

For 1995, Rahal-Hogan replaced Mike Groff with veteran Raul Boesel, and switched to Ilmor-Mercedes Benz "D" engines. Rahal finished third at the 1995 Indianapolis 500, which would ultimately be his final Indy start. Rahal notched eight top-fives and 12 top-tens to finish third in points. Boesel had seven top tens. Despite switching to a more conventional chassis/engine combination, the team remained winless for the third consecutive season.

=== 1996–1998 ===
In 1996, Carl Hogan left the team and started his own racing operation, Hogan Racing. As a result, the team changed its name to Team Rahal. Rahal signed a five-year sponsorship extension with Miller, and switched to the Reynard 96I chassis. Raul Boesel left to join Team Green, and Bryan Herta replaced Boesel in the team's second car, picking up sponsorship from Shell. In February of that year, comedian and talk show host David Letterman purchased a minority interest in the team.

Due to the open wheel "Split", Team Rahal did not compete at the Indianapolis 500. Instead Rahal and Herta raced at the U.S. 500 at Michigan. Herta qualified for the front row at Michigan, but was involved in the big crash at the start. Herta drove a backup car to 15th place. Bobby Rahal was running as high as 6th until he brushed the wall and dropped out with suspension damage. In the season finale at Laguna Seca, Bryan Herta nearly won his first career Indy car race. Leading on the final lap, Alex Zanardi made a daring, diving pass at the famous "Corkscrew" turns, to steal the victory in shocking fashion. The legendary incident became known in racing circles simply as "The Pass". Rahal and Herta combined for five podiums on the season, and finished 7th and 8th in points, respectively.

In 1997, Team Rahal switched to the Ford-Cosworth XD engine, and Rahal's sponsorship switched to the Miller Lite brand. The team struggled throughout the year, with Rahal posting only one podium finish. At the Rio 400, Rahal was leading the race, looking for his first win since 1992. However, he ran out of fuel with one lap to go. Herta also posted only one podium. Herta and Rahal finished 11th and 12th in points, respectively. The team's lack of winning was attributed to several factors, including Goodyear tires, and engine choice. After their divorce from Honda at the end of 1994, the powerplant was proving to be successful long-term, winning six consecutive CART championships (1996–2001).

Rahal announced he was going to retire from driving at the conclusion of the 1998 CART season. He embarked on a year-long "Last Ride" campaign, Rahal's best finish of the season was a third place at Mid-Ohio. He finished the season with ten top-10 finishes, and placed 10th in points. At Laguna Seca, Bryan Herta avenged his defeat from two years earlier. Herta started on the pole and led 81 of the 83 laps, posting his first Indy/Champ car victory. It was Team Rahal's first race win since 1992. Herta posted nine other top-tens, and finished 8th in points.

=== 1999–2003 ===
With Bobby Rahal now retired as a driver, over the next few years the team would employ Bryan Herta, Max Papis, Kenny Bräck, Jimmy Vasser and Michel Jourdain Jr. Bobby Rahal assumed additional roles during this timeframe, serving as interim president of CART in 2000, taking a managerial position with Jaguar, and co-owning a NASCAR Craftsman Truck Series team, Gloy-Rahal Racing. Bryan Herta made it back-to-back wins at Laguna Seca, but would be let go at the end of the 1999 season.

In 2000, Team Rahal signed 1998 IRL champion and 1999 Indianapolis 500 winner Kenny Bräck. Bräck won four races in 2001, and finished second in points. Max Papis won three races over his three seasons with the team (1999–2001), with a best result of 5th in points in 1999.

The driver lineup changed for 2002, as Papis and Bräck were replaced by veteran Jimmy Vasser and pay driver Michel Jourdain Jr. The results were above average, with Vasser winning one race, and finishing seventh in points. Jourdain had 14 top-tens, including a fourth-place in his debut at Monterrey, en route to a tenth-place ranking in points.

In 2003, the team dropped down to a one-car effort in the CART/Champ Car series. Michel Jourdain Jr. won two races, notched 15 top-tens, one pole, and finished third in points. The 2003 season would be Team Rahal's final year in CART/Champ Car. For 2004, the team would switch permanently to the IRL/IndyCar Series.

== Indy Racing League/IndyCar Series ==
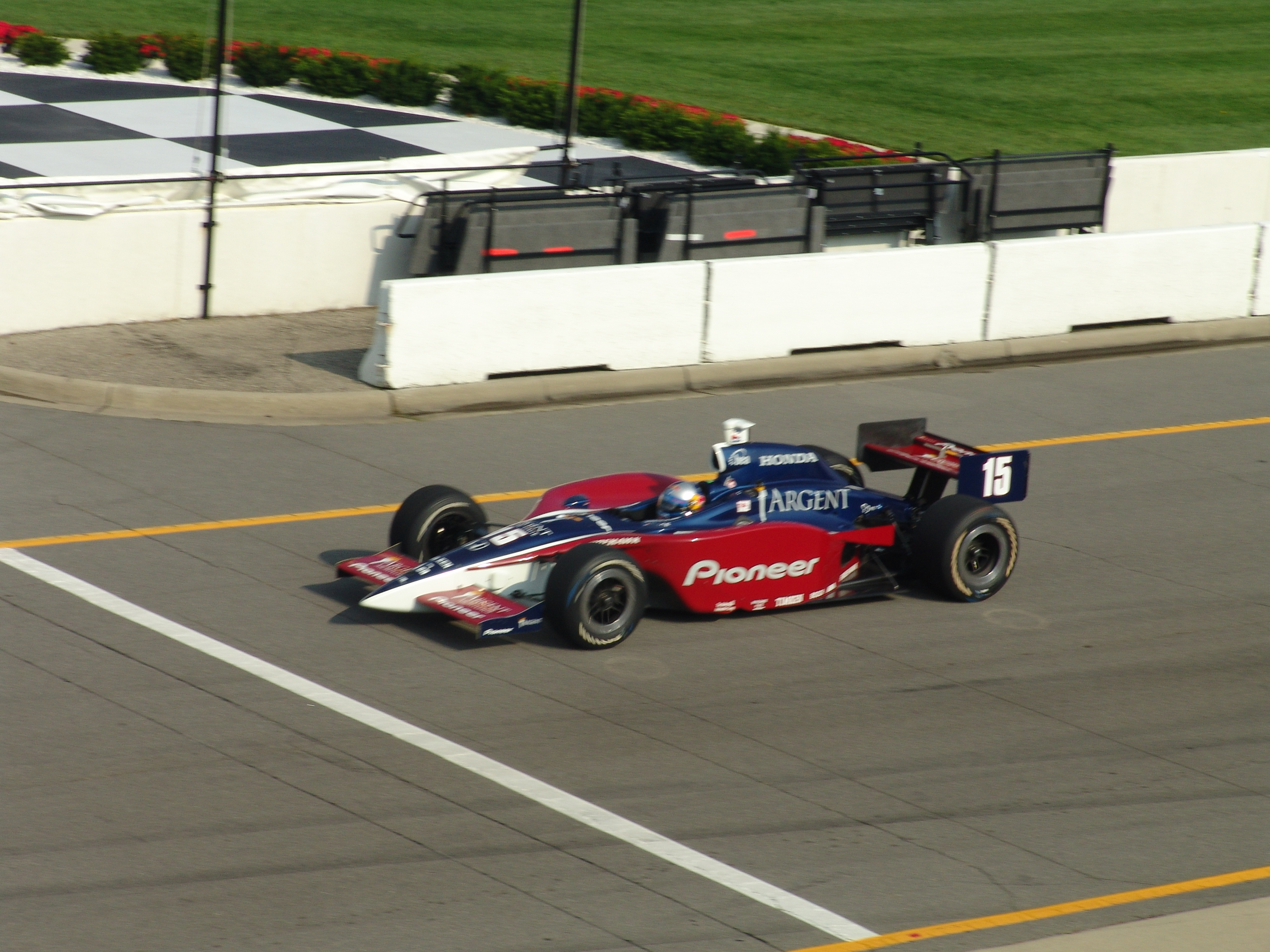
Buddy Rice in 2004

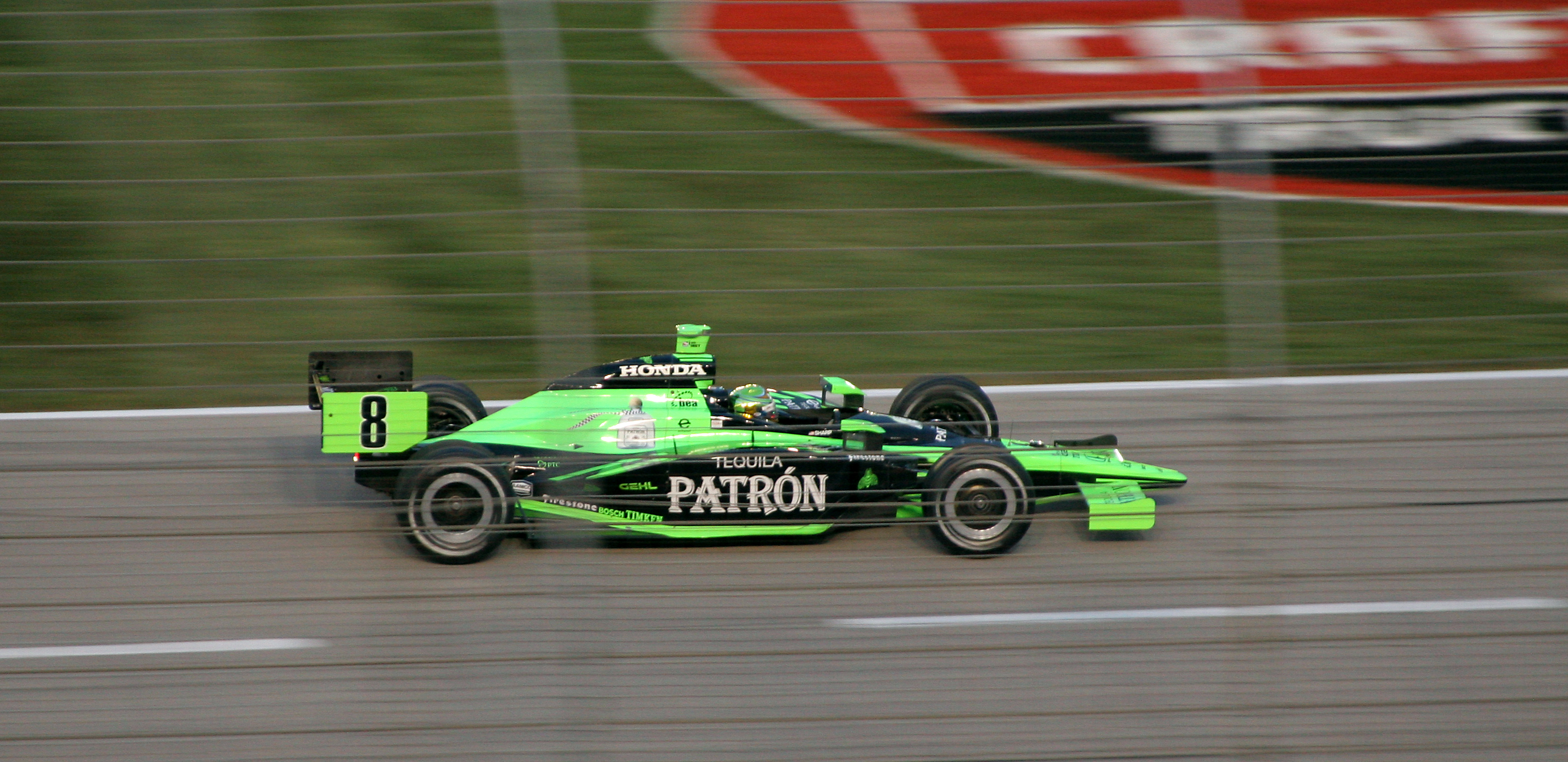
Scott Sharp in 2007

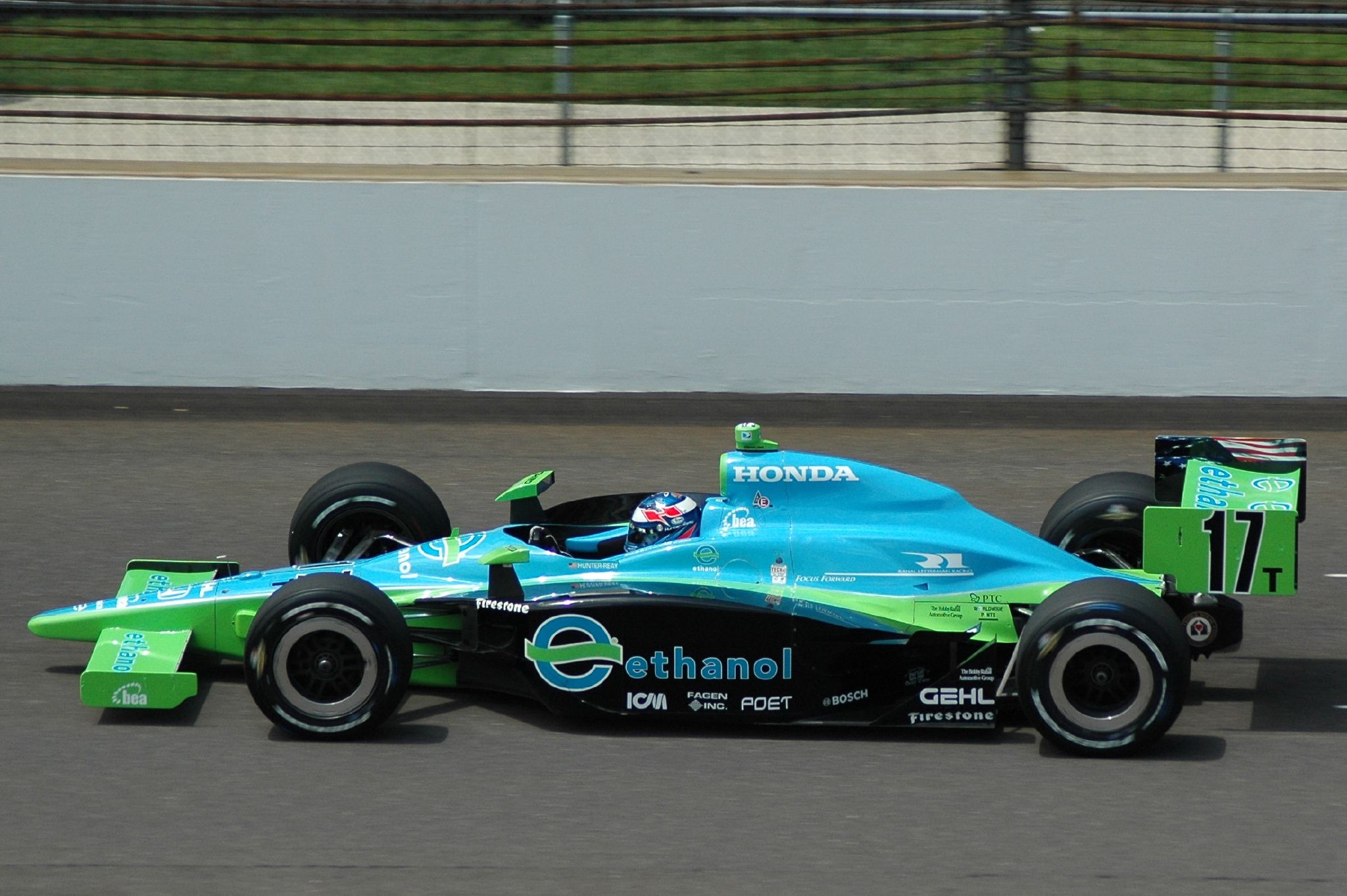
The Rahal Letterman car at Indianapolis in 2008

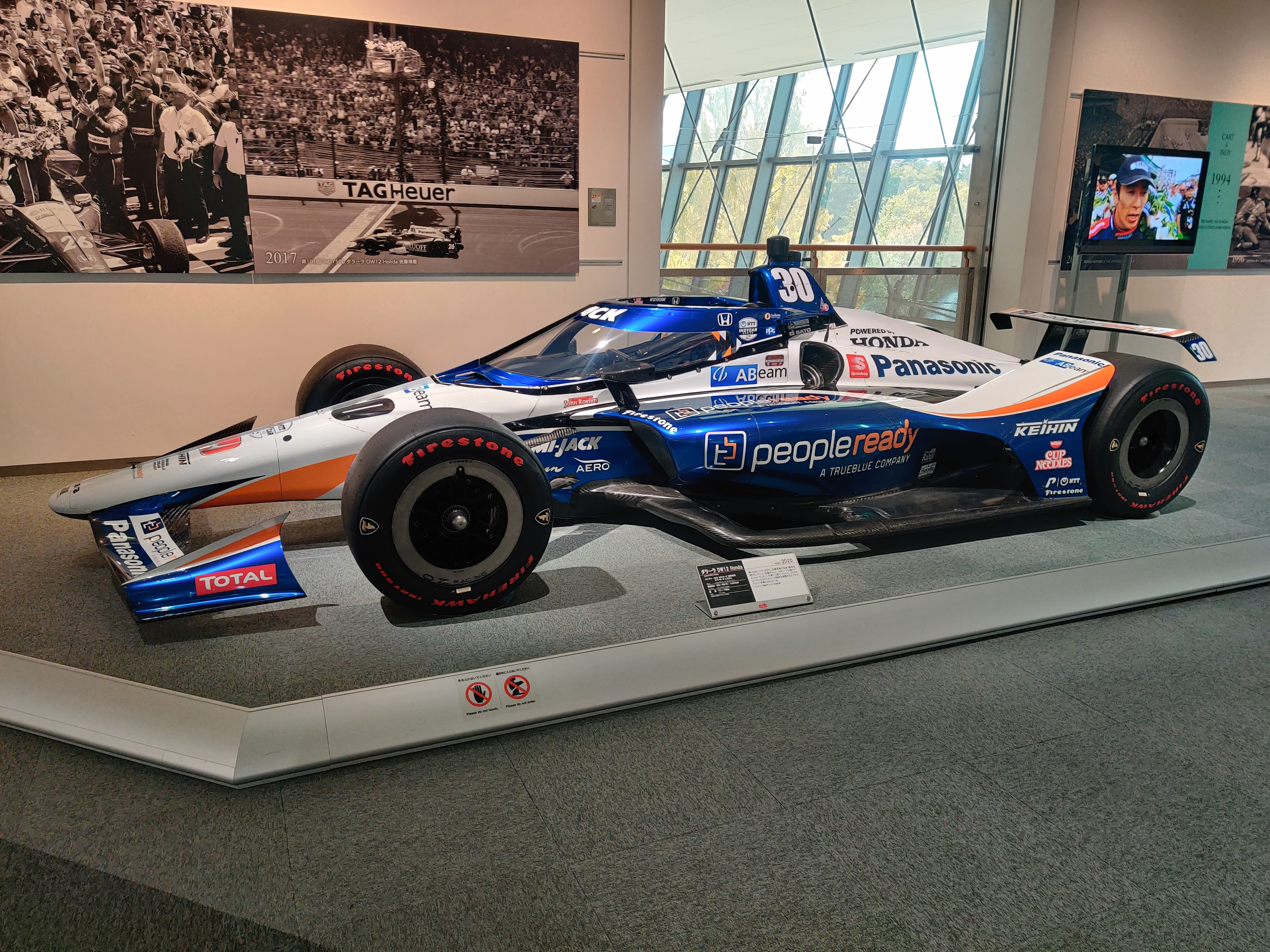
Takuma Sato's 2020 Indianapolis 500-winning car on display at Honda Collection Hall.

=== 2002–2003 ===
In 2002, while maintaining their full-time CART schedule, Team Rahal entered one car at the Indianapolis 500. It was their first appearance at Indy since 1995, and first participation in the IRL. They followed the trend of other major CART-based teams entering at Indy, and/or switching over to the rival IRL. As a tune-up in March, Jimmy Vasser drove to a 9th-place finish at Fontana, but dropped out and finished 30th at Indy.

For 2003, Team Rahal expanded to full-time in the IRL. They ran a full-time entry in CART (Michel Jourdain Jr.), a full-time entry in IRL (Kenny Bräck), and a second car at Indy only (Jimmy Vasser). Bräck returned to the team after a one-year stint with Ganassi. The 2003 season was significant for the team, as Rahal was reunited with full-works engine manufacturer Honda after their rift in 1994. Bräck finished 9th in IRL points, with a best finish of 2nd at Motegi. However, at the season finale at Texas, Bräck suffered a serious crash. His car launched into the catch fence, and he suffered critical, but non life-threatening injuries. He would require a lengthy recovery, and it essentially ended his driving career.

=== 2004 ===
In 2004, the team formally changed its name to Rahal Letterman Racing, and dropped its Champ Car program permanently. Buddy Rice was hired to drive in substitute of the injured Kenny Bräck. Vítor Meira was added as a second car, and Roger Yasukawa drove a third car at Motegi and Indianapolis. Rice's role was originally temporary, but when it became clear that Bräck was still unable to drive, Rice's spot turned full-time.

At Indianapolis, Rice won the pole position, the pit stop contest, led the most laps, and won the race, his first victory in championship-level competition. It also marked the long-anticipated first Indy 500 victory for Honda. Rice won again at Kansas and Michigan, and finished 3rd in points. Meira scored two second places, and one pole, and despite missing the first two races of the season, finished 8th in points.

=== 2005 ===
The driver lineup for 2005 included Buddy Rice, Vítor Meira, and rookie Danica Patrick. Patrick had driven for Team Rahal in Toyota Atlantics in 2003–2004, moving up to Indy cars for 2005. At the 2005 Indianapolis 500, Rice suffered a partially torn spinal ligament in a practice crash, and was replaced by Kenny Bräck. Patrick qualified 4th, led 19 laps, and finished 4th, the highest finish ever for a female driver at the Indianapolis 500 to-date. Meira finished 2nd, and Patrick won rookie of the year. Bräck, whose career had been on hiatus due to his 2003 crash, driving in substitution for Rice, was the fastest qualifier. But he dropped out on race day with mechanical problems. It would be Bräck's final career Indy car race.

Rice was able to return to the cockpit at the next race. His season was mostly disappointing, however, notching only four top-tens and no wins. Meira finished 7th in points, but it was Patrick who garnered the most attention on the season - at times overshadowing her teammates. She won three poles and posted seven top-tens. She won IndyCar rookie of the year, and finished 12th in points.

=== 2006–2008 ===
Rahal Letterman Racing had high hopes for 2006. Vítor Meira left the team to join Panther Racing. He was replaced by Paul Dana who brought sponsorship from the Ethanol Promotion Council. At the season opener at Homestead, the team qualified all three cars in the top nine (Patrick 3rd, Rice 6th, and Dana 9th). During the final practice on Sunday morning, Vision Racing's Ed Carpenter crashed in turn two and the car slid down the 20-degree banking. Dana, who seemed to not receive the signal from the spotter, ran into the gearbox section of Carpenter's car, sending Dana's car flying on the backstretch. Dana died in the hospital later that afternoon, and the entire team, including Patrick and Rice, withdrew.

Patrick and Rice raced together at St. Petersburg with the third car vacant out of respect for Dana. Effective at Motegi, Jeff Simmons was added as the team's third driver. In mid-2006 the team switched from the Panoz to the Dallara chassis. Rice finished 15th in points, Patrick finished 9th, and Simmons finished 16th.

In 2007, Rahal Letterman Racing fielded two cars, one for Simmons and one for IndyCar veteran Scott Sharp. Patrick went to Andretti Green Racing, and Rice moved over to Dreyer & Reinbold. However, after eleven races, the team released Simmons and picked up former Champ Car driver Ryan Hunter-Reay, who earned a 7th-place finish at Mid-Ohio. Consistent finishes gave Ryan and the team the Rookie of the Year award despite making only six starts.

In the 2008, Rahal Letterman Racing dropped down to just one car driven by Ryan Hunter-Reay. The team scored a win at Watkins Glen and Hunter-Reay finished 8th in points. At the end of the season, the team's ethanol promotion council sponsorship left and they unable to find full-time sponsorship going into 2009.

=== 2009–2011: Part time ===
RLR did not participate full-time in the 2009 season due to a lack of sponsorship. With the sponsorship of DAFCA they participated in the 2009 Indianapolis 500, where driver Oriol Servià, after starting on the ninth row, advanced to tenth place but completed only 98 laps before being forced to quit due to mechanical problems.

In 2010, the team again failed to secure sponsorship for the full season. At the 2010 Indianapolis 500, the team arranged a one-race sponsorship entry for Graham Rahal. Rahal ran in the top ten until a blocking penalty shuffled him back in the standings, and he finished 12th.

In December 2010, Mike Lanigan, former co-owner of Newman-Haas-Lanigan Racing with Carl Haas and actor Paul Newman, became co-owner of what was renamed Rahal Letterman Lanigan Racing.

The team signed Jay Howard to drive the #88 car with Service Central sponsorship for the 2011 Indy 500. Bertrand Baguette also joined the team at the 500. Howard finished 30th after losing a wheel following a pit stop on lap 61, while Baguette would lead 11 laps late in the race before needing to pit for fuel with 3 laps to go. He would finish 7th.

=== 2012–2023 ===
The team returned to full-time IndyCar competition for 2012, running a single Dallara-Honda for Takuma Sato, who achieved two podium finishes at São Paulo and Edmonton. Michel Jourdain Jr. returned to the team in a second car for the Indianapolis 500, where Sato came close to victory, crashing out on the final lap while attempting to pass Dario Franchitti for the lead.

On April 30, 2014, the team made history with Engage Mobile Solutions when four members of the RLL team including driver Graham Rahal and three members of the pit crew wore Google Glass to show an IndyCar Series pit stop from the unique perspective of each person on the racing team.

After rotating through a series of drivers, including Jourdain, Jay Howard, and Mike Conway, Graham Rahal returned to RLL to contest the full 2013 season. Rahal struggled during the 2013 and 2014 seasons with only four top-5 finishes. However, he would have a breakout year in 2015, snapping a six-year winless streak at Auto Club Speedway and dueling Justin Wilson to win at his home track at Mid-Ohio. Rahal would end the 2015 season fourth in points after consecutive bad races at Pocono and Sonoma.

For 2016, the team remained a single-car team but added Indy Lights champion Spencer Pigot to the lineup for three races. Rahal would take a win at Texas Motor Speedway by only .008 of a second.

During 2017 the team would watch another two wins, with Graham Rahal taking back-to-back victories at Detroit.

In 2018, RLL would re-sign Takuma Sato, who had previously won the 2017 Indianapolis 500 for Andretti Autosport. Sato would score his first win for the team at the 2018 Grand Prix of Portland, and would win twice more in the 2019 Indycar season, at Barber Motorsports Park and World Wide Technology Raceway at Gateway respectively. Sato won his second Indianapolis 500 in 2020, his first with RLL Racing. Rahal finished in 3rd position. The team also ran a third car for the first time in a race 2019 Indianapolis 500, with Jordan King finishing in 24th place.

In 2021 RLL again expanded to three cars, with Graham Rahal and Takuma Sato driving two full-time entries while several drivers would drive a third car on a part-time basis. The car would be backed by Hy-Vee, a supermarket chain in the Midwestern United States. Initially, the third car was only scheduled to run the 2021 Indianapolis 500 with Santino Ferrucci behind the wheel but after Ferucci's top ten finish in the 500 Hy-Vee gave additional sponsorship for the car to run at Detroit, Mid Ohio, and Nashville with Ferucci driving four races. After the Nashville round the team announced the third car would be run at the Big Machine Spiked Coolers Grand Prix and the final three races by different drivers in place of Ferrucci; Danish Formula 2 and current Alpine F1 Academy driver Christian Lundgaard would drive the car at the Big Machine Spiked Coolers Grand Prix on the IMS Road Course with the car backed by MiJack while Oliver Askew would drive the car at Portland, Laguna Seca, and Long Beach backed by Hy-Vee. During the season Ferrucci, Askew, and Lundgaard would all test the third car in shootout style tests to determine who would get the full time drive in the third car in 2022.

For 2022 Takuma Sato would depart the team. The #45 Hy-Vee car would be driven by Jack Harvey, who was signed from Meyer Shank Racing. The team announced on October 20, 2021, that Christian Lundgaard had won the opportunity to drive the #30 car full time and would sign a multi-year deal to compete with RLL full time from 2022 onward.

=== 2024–2026 ===
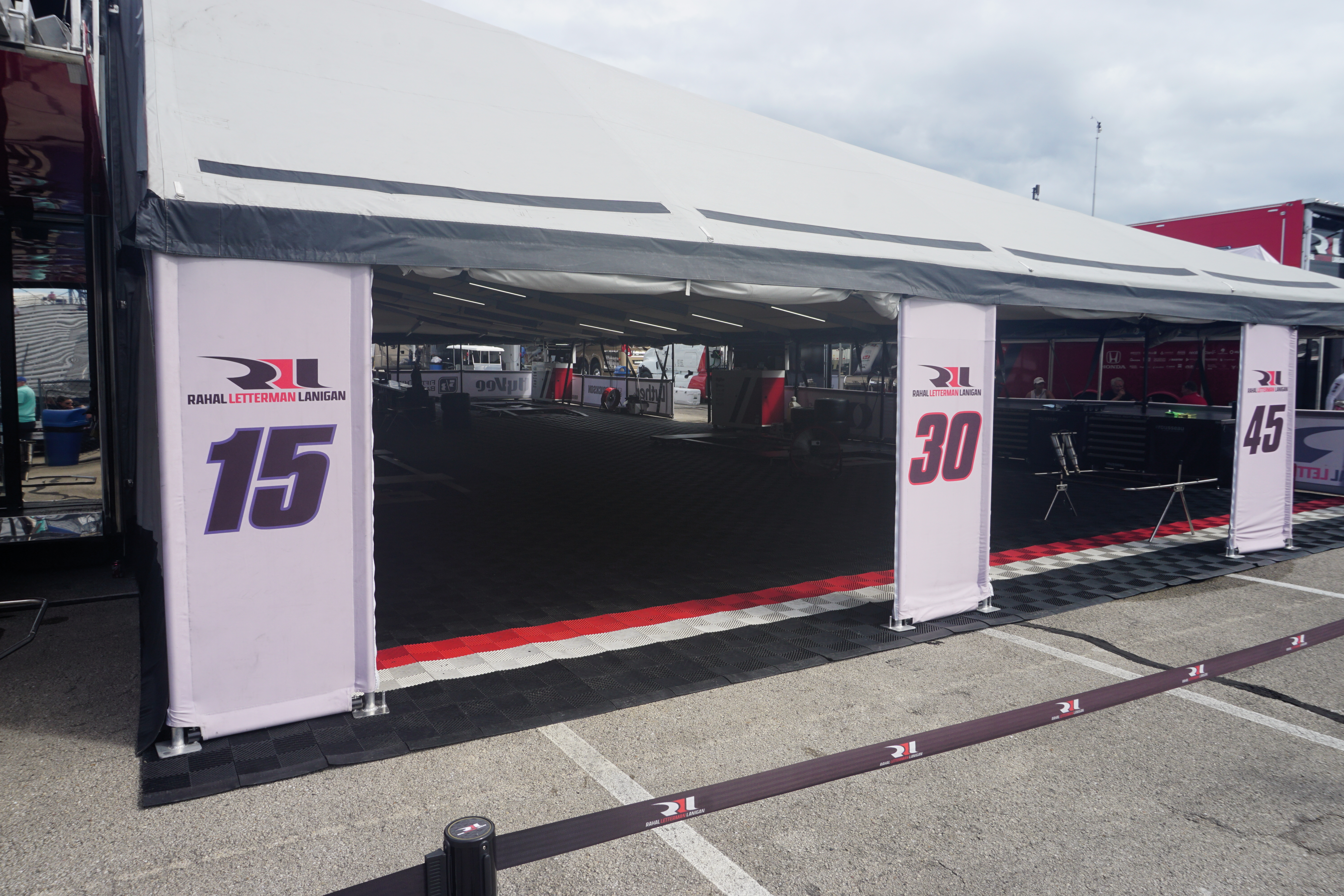
Rahal Letterman Lanigan Racing garage at the 2024 Hy-Vee Milwaukee Mile 250s

Graham Rahal continued full-time with the team in the #15 car. He was joined by Pietro Fittipaldi and Christian Lundgaard for 2024, then Devlin DeFrancesco and Louis Foster for 2025. The team struggled with results, with only a handful of top ten finishes over the two seasons. After failing to qualify at Indianapolis in 2023, Graham Rahal barely qualified in 2024, this time holding on and ranking 33rd (last).

In 2026, DeFrancesco was replaced by Mick Schumacher.

In 2024, Takuma Sato returned to the team to serve as a fourth "Indy-only" entry at the Indianapolis 500. He qualified 2nd in 2025 and led a race-high 51 laps, and finished 9th. In 2026, he notched another top ten.

== American Le Mans Series ==
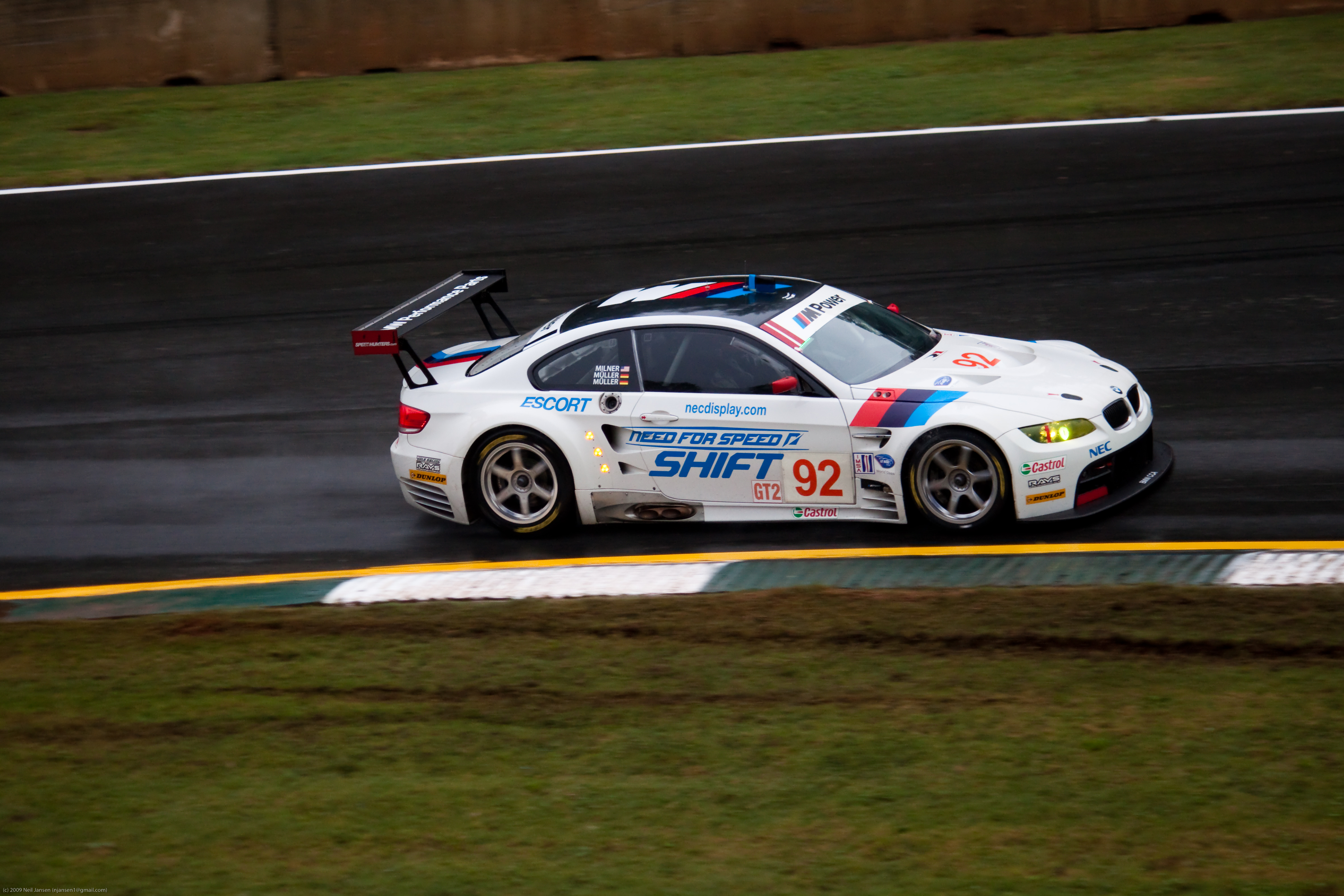
2009 Petit Le Mans.

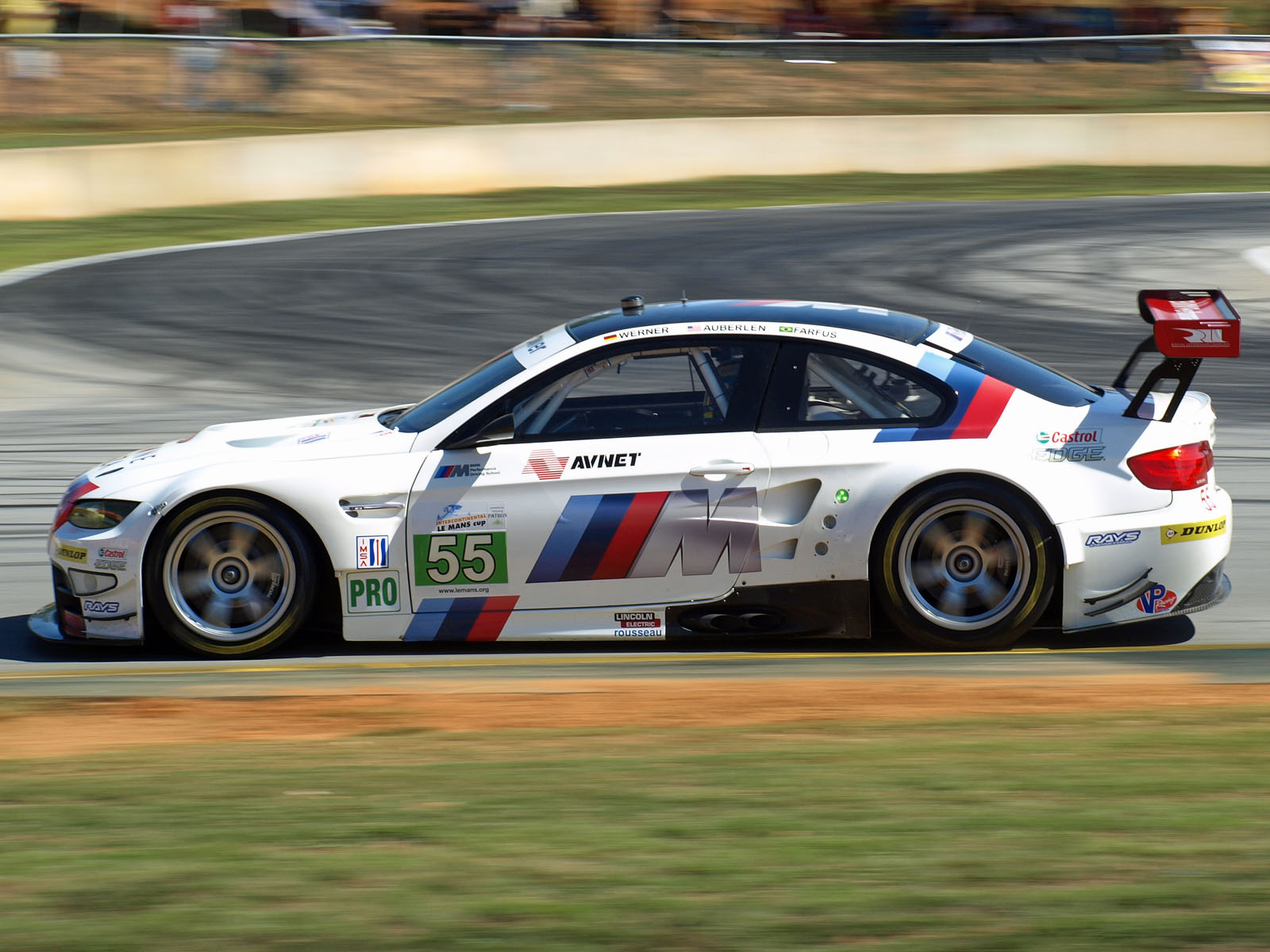
2011 Petit Le Mans.

=== 2007 (Porsche) ===
In 2007, Rahal Letterman Racing fielded a Porsche 911 GT3 RSR for nine of the twelve races. The team's best results came as a second-place finish at Road America and a third-place finish at Petit Le Mans. The team finished 4th in the GT2 team championship with Tommy Milner and Ralf Kelleners 6th in the driver's championship.

=== 2009–13 (BMW) ===
After one-year hiatus, the team returned to the series in 2009 with factory support from BMW and thus held dual nationality team licenses (Germany and United States). The team fielded two M3 GT2's, the #90 driven by Joey Hand and Bill Auberlen and the #92 driven by Tommy Milner and Dirk Müller. After a troubled season, the #92 car finished second at the 2009 Petit Le Mans. The team finished 3rd in the team championship with Milner and Müller 4th in the driver's championship.

In 2010, the team continued their relationship with BMW and the American Le Mans Series. Despite only winning one race at Road America, Rahal Letterman Racing won the team championship while Bill Auberlen and Tommy Milner 3rd in the driver's championship.

2011 was an even more successful year for the team. After a one-two finish at the 2011 12 Hours of Sebring the RLL Racing team would win two more races. Despite fierce competition from Corvette, Ferrari, and Porsche, Rahal Letterman Lanigan Racing claimed the GT Teams and Manufacturers championships, While Joey Hand and Dirk Müller won the drivers championship. This was the second team championship for the team with the M3.

In 2012, the team returned to the American Le Mans Series for their 4th year with the BMW M3. After winning their second 12 Hours of Sebring in a row, the team, lacking the speed to the brand new Porsches and Corvettes, would win only one more race at Road America. Despite their deficit in pace, the team finished the season 2nd in the championship with driver Dirk Muller finished 4th, the highest of the BMW team drivers.

Further developing their relationship with BMW Motorsport, the Rahal Letterman Lanigan team campaigned two brand new Z4 GTE cars, replacing the BMW M3 GT2's. Despite being their first season with the car, the team claimed several GT poles, a 1–2 victory at Long Beach, and a win at Lime Rock Park. The team finished the season 2nd in the Teams' and Manufacturers' Championships behind Corvette Racing.

== IMSA SportsCar Championship ==
For 2014, the team continued with its Z4 GTE cars but under the newly formed United SportsCar Championship (which became the IMSA SportsCar Championship starting with the 2016 season). The team would manage four second-place finishes at Daytona and Laguna Seca with the #55 car and Long Beach and Road America for the #56 car. Dirk Müller and teammate John Edwards would finish seventh in the GTLM Drivers' Championship with Bill Auberlen and teammate Andy Priaulx eighth.

For 2015, the team would make several changes to its lineup, this time with ALMS champion Lucas Luhr replacing Müller in the No. 24, and Auberlen being teamed with Dirk Werner in the No. 25. Both teams would take wins during the season, with Edwards/Luhr winning at Laguna Seca, and Auberlen/Werner taking two wins at Long Beach and Austin. Auberlen/Werner would finish second in points to Porsche factory driver Patrick Pilet for the drivers championship. The 24 team also finished 2nd in the teams championship to the Porsche 911 team and BMW finished 2nd to Porsche in manufacturer championship.

For 2016, the team switched to the new BMW M6 GTLM, and the No. 24 team was assigned the Number 100 in celebration of BMW's 100th anniversary. The 25 team finished 7th in the drivers championship and the 100 team in 9th, with neither team winning.

In 2017, the 100 team reverted to the #24, with Martin Tomczyk replacing Luhr as Edwards' teammate, and Alexander Sims as Auberlen's new partner in the 25. The teams returned to their winning ways, with the 25 team (Auberlen/Sims) winning the 6 Hours of the Glen, Petit Le Mans and the Canadian Tire Motorsports Park event and finishing 2nd in the drivers championship. The 24 team (Edwards/Tomczyk) won at Mazda Raceway Laguna Seca, but finished 7th in the championship. The four victories also elevated BMW to 2nd in the 2017 GTLM Manufacturers championship, losing to Chevrolet by just 6 points.

In November 2017, Auberlen was named a BMW Brand Ambassador, and thus stepped down as a full-time driver for 2018. He was replaced by Connor De Phillippi as Sims' full-time partner in the 25 team. Edwards also had a partner change at the 24 team, with Jesse Krohn replacing Tomczyk. RLL also updated to the new BMW M8 GTE. The 25 team (Sims/De Phillippi) won at VIR and Laguna Seca and finished 6th in the 2018 drivers championship, while the 24 team (Edwards/Krohn) finished the season 8th with no race victories.

For 2019, the 24 driver team will remain intact, but Tom Blomqvist was announced to replace Sims as De Phillippi's full-season partner in the 25 team. However, due to delays with his U.S. Visa, Blomqvist had to miss the 2019 24 Hours of Daytona. He was replaced at Daytona by Augusto Farfus, who, along with co-drivers De Phillippi, Colton Herta and Philipp Eng, won the race in the GTLM class. However, the cars scored only three additional podiums combined, so they ranked 6th and 7th in the GTLM drivers standings.

In 2020, the #24 car won the 24 Hours of Daytona and got five additional points, ending second in points. Meanwhile, the #25 car won the 6 Hours of Atlanta plus three more podiums, placing fourth in points.

BMW reduced its budget for the 2021 season, so RLL only entered the four endurance races. In a depleted GTLM field, they scored six podiums combined but no wins.

IMSA dropped the GTLM class before the 2022 season. RLL joined the new GTD Pro class with the new BMW M4 GT3. The #25 runs full-time, whereas the #24 is an endurance-only entry.

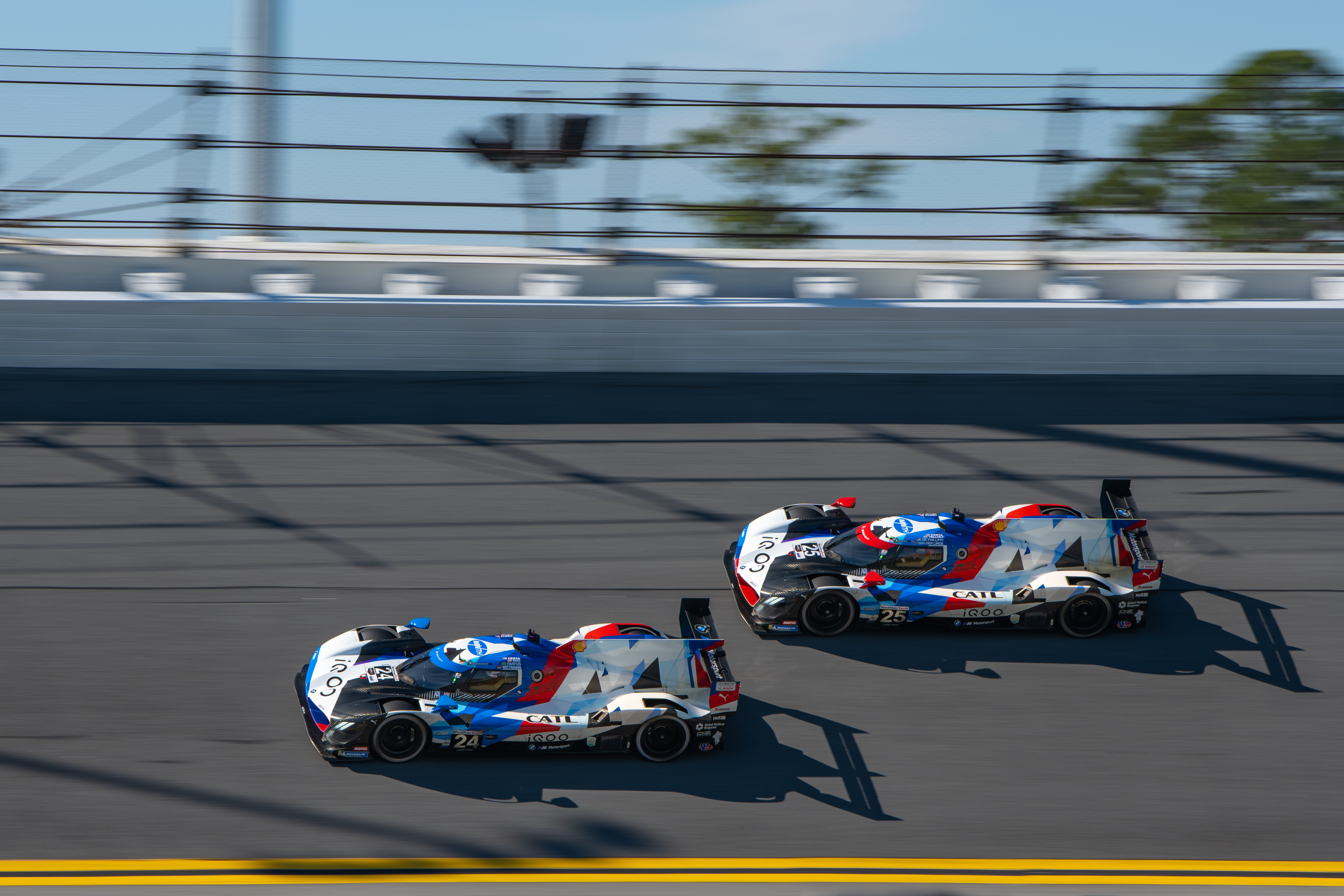
RLL's two BMW M Hybrid V8s at Daytona International Speedway in 2023.

The team was announced to join the IMSA GTP class in 2023 with two LMDh-spec BMW M Hybrid V8s. The team took their first victory in the class at the 2023 Sahlen's Six Hours of The Glen.

== Jaguar I-Pace eTrophy ==
On 28 November 2017, it was announced that the team was to be the first to confirm entry to the I-PACE eTROPHY. The team confirmed that they will run two cars in the series. Katherine Legge and Bryan Sellers are part of the current line-up.

== CART/Champ Car drivers ==
Year	Driver(s)	
1992	(United States) Bobby Rahal	
1993	(United States) Bobby Rahal	(United States) Mike Groff
1994	(United States) Bobby Rahal	(United States) Mike Groff
1995	(United States) Bobby Rahal	(Brazil) Raul Boesel
1996	(United States) Bobby Rahal	(United States) Bryan Herta
1997	(United States) Bobby Rahal	(United States) Bryan Herta
1998	(United States) Bobby Rahal	(United States) Bryan Herta
1999	(Italy) Max Papis	(United States) Bryan Herta
2000	(Italy) Max Papis	(Sweden) Kenny Bräck
2001	(Italy) Max Papis	(Sweden) Kenny Bräck
2002	(United States) Jimmy Vasser	(Mexico) Michel Jourdain Jr.
2003	(Mexico) Michel Jourdain Jr.	

== IndyCar drivers ==
Year	Full season driver(s)	Indy 500 driver(s)
2002		(United States) Jimmy Vasser (also Fontana in 2002)
2003	(Sweden) Kenny Bräck	(United States) Jimmy Vasser (also Fontana in 2002)
2004	(United States) Buddy Rice (Brazil) Vítor Meira	(Japan) / (United States) Roger Yasukawa (also Motegi)
2005	(United States) Buddy Rice (sat out Indy 500 due to injury) (Brazil) Vítor Meira (United States) Danica Patrick	(Sweden) Kenny Bräck (replaced injured Rice)
2006	(United States) Buddy Rice (United States) Danica Patrick (United States) Paul Dana (killed in warmup Round 1) (United States) Jeff Simmons (replaced Dana)	
2007	(United States) Scott Sharp (United States) Jeff Simmons (fired July 17) (United States) Ryan Hunter-Reay (signed July 17)	
2008	(United States) Ryan Hunter-Reay	(United Kingdom) Alex Lloyd
2009		(Spain) Oriol Servià
2010		(United States) Graham Rahal
2011		(Belgium) Bertrand Baguette
2012	(Japan) Takuma Sato	(Mexico) Michel Jourdain Jr.
2013	(United States) Graham Rahal (United Kingdom) James Jakes	(Mexico) Michel Jourdain Jr. (Failed to qualify)
2014	(United States) Graham Rahal	(Spain) Oriol Servià (also Alabama, Long Beach, and Indy GP in 2014)
2015	(United States) Graham Rahal	(Spain) Oriol Servià (also Alabama, Long Beach, and Indy GP in 2014)
2016	(United States) Graham Rahal	(United States) Spencer Pigot (also St. Petersburg & Indianapolis GP)
2017	(United States) Graham Rahal	(Spain) Oriol Servià (also Detroit in 2017)
2018	(United States) Graham Rahal (Japan) Takuma Sato	(Spain) Oriol Servià (also Detroit in 2017)
2019	(United States) Graham Rahal (Japan) Takuma Sato	(United Kingdom) Jordan King
2020	(United States) Graham Rahal (Japan) Takuma Sato	(United States) Spencer Pigot (also Indy GP)
2021	(United States) Graham Rahal (Japan) Takuma Sato	(United States) Santino Ferrucci (also Detroit, Mid Ohio and Nashville)
2022	(United States) Graham Rahal (United Kingdom) Jack Harvey (Denmark) Christian Lundgaard	
2023	(United States) Graham Rahal (United Kingdom) Jack Harvey (Denmark) Christian Lundgaard	(United Kingdom) Katherine Legge
2024	(United States) Graham Rahal (Brazil) Pietro Fittipaldi (Denmark) Christian Lundgaard	(Japan) Takuma Sato
2025	(United States) Graham Rahal (Canada) Devlin DeFrancesco (United Kingdom) Louis Foster	(Japan) Takuma Sato
2026	(United States) Graham Rahal (United Kingdom) Louis Foster (Germany) Mick Schumacher	(Japan) Takuma Sato

- IndyCar driver Paul Dana was fatally injured in morning warmup for the March 26, 2006 Toyota Indy 300 at Homestead-Miami Speedway. All three Rahal Letterman cars withdrew and were credited with half points by rule. The No. 17 withdrew from the Honda Grand Prix of St. Petersburg, and Jeff Simmons was named to drive the Ethanol #17 entry for the balance of the 2006 season. Midway through the 2007 season, Simmons was fired and replaced with Ryan Hunter-Reay.

== Racing results ==
=== CART FedEx Championship Series results ===
(key) (results in bold indicate pole position) (results in italics indicate fastest lap)

Year	Chassis	Engine	Tyres	Drivers	No.	1	2	3	4	5	6	7	8	9	10	11	12	13	14	15	16	17	18	19	20	21	Pts Pos	Pos
Rahal-Hogan Racing
1992						SFR	PHX	LBH	INDY	DET	POR	MIL	NHA	TOR	MCH	CLE	ROA	VAN	MDO	NAZ	LAG							
1992	Lola T92/00	Chevrolet 265A V8t	G	(United States) Bobby Rahal	12	3	1*	2	6	1	14	**2**	**1***	**2**	11	4	3	22	24	1	3						**1st**	196
1993						SFR	PHX	LBH	INDY	MIL	DET	POR	CLE	TOR	MCH	NHA	ROA	VAN	MDO	NAZ	LAG							
1993	RH-001	Chevrolet 265C V8t	G	(United States) Bobby Rahal	1	6	22	2	DNQ																		4th	133
1993	Lola T93/00	Chevrolet 265C V8t	G	(United States) Bobby Rahal	1					4	5	4	28	4	9	7	3	2*	6	6	7						4th	133
1993	RH-001	Chevrolet 265C V8t	G	(United States) Mike Groff	1				DNQ																		23rd	8
1993	RH-001	Chevrolet 265C V8t	G	(United States) Mike Groff	26					19	11	9				11											23rd	8
1993	Lola T93/00	Chevrolet 265C V8t	G	(United States) Mike Groff	26												18		22								23rd	8
1994						SFR	PHX	LBH	INDY	MIL	DET	POR	CLE	TOR	MCH	MDO	NHA	VAN	ROA	NAZ	LAG							
1994	Lola T94/00	Honda HRX V8t	G	(United States) Bobby Rahal	4	26	14	30		7	6	12	28	2	28	27	9	7	9	14	29						10th	59
1994	Penske PC-22	Ilmor 265D V8t	G	(United States) Bobby Rahal	4				3																		10th	59
1994	Lola T94/00	Honda HRX V8t	G	(United States) Mike Groff	10	8	6	27		19	27	11	19	22	27	26	25	14	20	11	15						20th	17
1994	Penske PC-22	Ilmor 265C V8t	G	(United States) Mike Groff	10				31																		20th	17
1995						MIA	SFR	PHX	LBH	NAZ	INDY	MIL	DET	POR	ROA	TOR	CLE	MCH	MDO	NHA	VAN	LAG						
1995	Lola T95/00	Mercedes-Benz IC108B V8t	G	(United States) Bobby Rahal	9	3	2	21	21	6	3	13	24	3	5	2	4	8	26	10	5	7					**3rd**	128
1995	Lola T95/00	Mercedes-Benz IC108B V8t	G	(Brazil) Raul Boesel	11	6	8	6	16	10	20	11	DNS	5	22	6	20	24	20	18	10	12					16th	48
Team Rahal
1996						MIA	RIO	SFR	LBH	NAZ	500	MIL	DET	POR	CLE	TOR	MCH	MDO	ROA	VAN	LAG							
1996	Reynard 96i	Mercedes-Benz IC108C V8t	G	(United States) Bobby Rahal	18	5	6	20	14	6	19	7	21	6	15	3	24	5	2	2	7						7th	102
1996	Reynard 96i	Mercedes-Benz IC108C V8t	G	(United States) Bryan Herta	28	10	13	17	12	11	15	14	13	26	5	6	2	4	5	6	2						8th	86
1997						MIA	SFR	LBH	NAZ	RIO	GAT	MIL	DET	POR	CLE	TOR	MCH	MDO	ROA	VAN	LAG	FON						
1997	Reynard 97i	Ford XD V8t	G	(United States) Bobby Rahal	7	16	10	10	6	10*	20	11	9	24	5	9	17	3	6	24	19	5					12th	70
1997	Reynard 97i	Ford XD V8t	G	(United States) Bryan Herta	8	10	22	6	7	6	22	15	7	21	3	17	5	**24**	11	8	**6**	21					11th	72
1998						MIA	MOT	LBH	NAZ	RIO	GAT	MIL	DET	POR	CLE	TOR	MCH	MDO	ROA	VAN	LAG	HOU	SFR	FON				
1998	Reynard 98i	Ford XD V8t	F	(United States) Bobby Rahal	7	19	17	17	6	8	8	5	11	6	8	4	7	3	8	25	16	23	25	11			10th	82
1998	Reynard 98i	Ford XD V8t	F	(United States) Bryan Herta	8	8	28	**3**	8	4	23	11	21	**3**	13	5	10	25	23	22	**1***	8	10	15			8th	97
1999						MIA	MOT	LBH	NAZ	RIO	GAT	MIL	POR	CLE	ROA	TOR	MCH	DET	MDO	CHI	VAN	LAG	HOU	SRF	FON			
1999	Reynard 99i	Ford XD V8t	F	(Italy) Max Papis	7	5	16	9	13	4	5	13	8	16	5	5	7*	26	5	**4**	23	3	4	2	2*		5th	150
1999	Reynard 99i	Ford XD V8t	F	(United States) Bryan Herta	8	12	23	3	22	13	23	25	6	6	15	15	20	9	21	8	24	**1***	5	4	14		12th	84
2000						MIA	LBH	RIO	MOT	NAZ	MIL	DET	POR	CLE	TOR	MCH	CHI	MDO	ROA	VAN	LAG	GAT	HOU	SRF	FON			
2000	Reynard 2Ki	Ford XF V8t	F	(Italy) Max Papis	7	1	20	16	8	22	7	2	25	18	8	9	24	4	7	8	16	6	24	16	12		14th	88
2000	Reynard 2Ki	Ford XF V8t	F	(Sweden) Kenny Bräck	8	18	17	10	5	3	4	24	6	2	10	22	4	5	3	9	5	11	15	2	13*		4th	135
2000	Reynard 2Ki	Ford XF V8t	F	(United States) Casey Mears **(R)**	91																				4		23rd	12
2001						MTY	LBH	TXS	NAZ	MOT	MIL	DET	POR	CLE	TOR	MCH	CHI	MDO	ROA	VAN	LAU	ROC	HOU	LAG	SRF	FON		
2001	Lola B01/00	Ford XF V8t	F	(Italy) Max Papis	7	12	17	C^{1}	24	6	8	11	**1***	18	8	16*	13	24	16	22	2	11	9	1	9	2*	6th	107
2001	Lola B01/00	Ford XF V8t	F	(Sweden) Kenny Bräck	8	**5**	25	C^{1}	2*	1	**1***	9	11	6	20	**17**	1	20	**14**	8	1*	**2**	7	25	5	26	**2nd**	163
2002						MTY	LBH	MOT	MIL	LAG	POR	CHI	TOR	CLE	VAN	MDO	ROA	MTL	DEN	ROC	MIA	SFR	FON	MEX				
2002	Lola B02/00	Ford XF V8t	B	(United States) Jimmy Vasser	8	20	**2**	20	9	8	16	17	6	6	17	8	5	5	10	7	3	12	1*	11			7th	114
2002	Lola B02/00	Ford XF V8t	B	(Mexico) Michel Jourdain Jr.	9	4	4	5	5	9	6	10	12	9	4	11	9	6	9	11	6	10	13	13			10th	105
2003						STP	MTY	LBH	BRH	LAU	MIL	LAG	POR	CLE	TOR	VAN	ROA	MDO	MTL	DEN	MIA	MEX	SFR					
2003	Lola B02/00	Ford XFE V8t	B	(Mexico) Michel Jourdain Jr.	9	2	2	**15***	6	3	1*	4	12	7	2	4	16	4	1	6	7	4	4				**3rd**	195

- ^{1} The Firestone Firehawk 600 was canceled after qualifying due to excessive g-forces on the drivers. Kenny Bräck was given one bonus point for qualifying on pole.

=== IndyCar Series results ===
(key)

Year	Chassis	Engine	Drivers	No.	1	2	3	4	5	6	7	8	9	10	11	12	13	14	15	16	17	18	19	Pos	Pts
Team Rahal
2002					HMS	PHX	FON	NAZ	INDY	TXS	PPIR	RIR	KAN	NSH	MCH	KTY	GAT	CHI	TXS						
2002	Dallara IR-02	Chevrolet Indy V8	(United States) Jimmy Vasser	19			9		30															40th	**23**
2003					HMS	PHX	MOT	INDY	TXS	PPIR	RIR	KAN	NSH	MCH	GAT	KTY	NAZ	CHI	FON	TXS					
2003	Dallara IR-03	Honda HI3R V8	(Sweden) Kenny Bräck	15	11	5	2	16	4	7	7	5	6	18	19	19	5	21	20	16				9th	**342**
2003	Dallara IR-03	Honda HI3R V8	(United States) Jimmy Vasser	19				26																36th	**4**
Rahal Letterman Racing
2004					HMS	PHX	MOT	INDY	TXS	RIR	KAN	NSH	MIL	MCH	KTY	PPIR	NAZ	CHI	FON	TXS					
2004	G-Force GF09B	Honda HI4R V8	(United States) Buddy Rice	15	**7**	9	6	**1***	15	6	**1***	**6**	2	1	**2**	22	4	14	5	20				3rd	**485**
2004	G-Force GF09B	Honda HI4R V8	(United States) Roger Yasukawa	16			11	10																26th	**39**
2004	G-Force GF09B	Honda HI4R V8	(Brazil) Vítor Meira	17			17	6	6	2	2	12*	**5**	5	7	7	10	5	21	4				8th	**376**
2005					HMS	PHX	STP	MOT	INDY	TXS	RIR	KAN	NSH	MIL	MCH	KTY	PPIR	SNM	CHI	WGL	FON				
2005	Panoz GF09C	Honda HI5R V8	(United States) Buddy Rice	15	19	22	7	3		21	11	10	18	17	22	14	11	2	13	19	12			15th	**295**
2005	Panoz GF09C	Honda HI5R V8	(Sweden) Kenny Bräck	15					26															34th	**10**
2005	Panoz GF09C	Honda HI5R V8	(United States) Danica Patrick **(R)**	16	15	15	12	4	4	13	10	**9**	7	19	20	**16**	8	20	**6**	16	18			12th	**325**
2005	Panoz GF09C	Honda HI5R V8	(Brazil) Vítor Meira	17	4	11	5	15	2	9	20	3	16	9	14	2	5	9	7	18	3			7th	**422**
2006					HMS	STP	MOT	INDY	WGL	TXS	RIR	KAN	NSH	MIL	MCH	KTY	SNM	CHI							
2006	Panoz GF09C; Dallara IR-05	Honda HI6R V8	(United States) Buddy Rice	15	DNS	13	5	26	4	18	13	17	16	11	13	15	15	13						15th	**234**
2006	Panoz GF09C; Dallara IR-05	Honda HI6R V8	(United States) Danica Patrick	16	DNS	6	8	8	8	12	15	11	4	4	17	8	8	12						9th	**302**
2006	Panoz GF09C; Dallara IR-05	Honda HI6R V8	(United States) Paul Dana **(R)**	17	DNS^{†}																			40th	**6**
2006	Panoz GF09C; Dallara IR-05	Honda HI6R V8	(United States) Jeff Simmons **(R)**	17			18	23	19	15	19	10	7	9	10	14	7	8						16th	**217**
2007					HMS	STP	MOT	KAN	INDY	MIL	TXS	IOW	RIR	WGL	NSH	MDO	MCH	KTY	SNM	DET	CHI				
2007	Dallara IR-05	Honda HI7R V8	(United States) Scott Sharp	8	12	11	6	13	6	6	**7**	3	8	14	7	11	3	6	14	11	5			8th	**412**
2007	Dallara IR-05	Honda HI7R V8	(United States) Jeff Simmons	17	17	14	8	10	11	10	6	17	18	10	14									18th	**201**
2007	Dallara IR-05	Honda HI7R V8	(United States) Ryan Hunter-Reay **(R)**	17												7	6	15	18	18	7			19th	**119**
2008					HMS	STP	MOT	LBH	KAN	INDY	MIL	TXS	IOW	RIR	WGL	NSH	MDO	EDM	KTY	SNM	DET	CHI	SRF^{2}		
2008	Dallara IR-05	Honda HI8R V8	(United Kingdom) Alex Lloyd **(R)**	16						25														38th	**10**
2008	Dallara IR-05	Honda HI8R V8	(United States) Ryan Hunter-Reay	17	7	17	7		18	6	15	20	8	16	1	19	10	8	9	18	6	9	3	8th	**360**
2009					STP	LBH	KAN	INDY	MIL	TXS	IOW	RIR	WGL	TOR	EDM	KTY	MDO	SNM	CHI	MOT	HMS				
2009	Dallara IR-05	Honda HI9R V8	(Spain) Oriol Servià	17				26																21st	**115**
2010					SAO	STP	ALA	LBH	KAN	INDY	TXS	IOW	WGL	TOR	EDM	MDO	SNM	CHI	KTY	MOT	HMS				
2010	Dallara IR-05	Honda HI10R V8	(United States) Graham Rahal	30						12														20th	**235**
Rahal Letterman Lanigan Racing
2011					STP	ALA	LBH	SAO	INDY	TXS		MIL	IOW	TOR	EDM	MDO	NHM	SNM	BAL	MOT	KTY	LSV			
2011	Dallara IR-05	Honda HI11R V8	(United Kingdom) Jay Howard	15																		C^{3}		40th	**27**
2011	Dallara IR-05	Honda HI11R V8	(Belgium) Bertrand Baguette	30					7															39th	**30**
2011	Dallara IR-05	Honda HI11R V8	(United Kingdom) Pippa Mann **(R)**	30													DNS				22	C^{3}		38th	**32**
2012					STP	ALA	LBH	SAO	INDY	DET	TEX	MIL	IOW	TOR	EDM	MDO	SNM	BAL	FON						
2012	Dallara DW12	Honda HI12RT V6t	(Japan) Takuma Sato	15	22	24	8	3	17	20	22	20	12	9	2	13	27	21	7					14th	**281**
2012	Dallara DW12	Honda HI12RT V6t	(Mexico) Michel Jourdain Jr.	30					19															32nd	**16**
2013					STP	ALA	LBH	SAO	INDY	DET		TXS	MIL	IOW	POC	TOR		MDO	SNM	BAL	HOU		FON		
2013	Dallara DW12	Honda HI13RT V6t	(United States) Graham Rahal	15	13	21	2	22	25	9	9	21	16	5	18	20	13	18	11	17	7	18	15	18th	**319**
2013	Dallara DW12	Honda HI13RT V6t	(United Kingdom) James Jakes	16	15	23	12	17	20	10	2	12	18	18	12	12	23	13	25	23	6	17	22	19th	**294**
2013	Dallara DW12	Honda HI13RT V6t	(United Kingdom) Mike Conway	17			25																	23rd	**185**
2013	Dallara DW12	Honda HI13RT V6t	(Mexico) Michel Jourdain Jr.	17					DNQ															NC	—
2014					STP	LBH	ALA	IMS	INDY	DET		TXS	HOU		POC	IOW	TOR		MDO	MIL	SNM	FON			
2014	Dallara DW12	Honda HI14TT V6t	(United States) Graham Rahal	15	14	13	17	21	33	2	21	12	11	16	19	7	6	20	5	14	20	18		19th	**345**
2014	Dallara DW12	Honda HI14TT V6t	(Spain) Oriol Servià	16		7	20	12	11															24th	**88**
2014	Dallara DW12	Honda HI14TT V6t	(Italy) Luca Filippi	16									21	15			22	16						28th	**46**
2015					STP	NOL	LBH	ALA	IMS	INDY	DET		TXS	TOR	FON	MIL	IOW	MDO	POC	SNM					
2015	Dallara DW12	Honda HI15TT V6t	(United States) Graham Rahal	15	11	8	11	2	2	5	23	3	15	9	1	3	4	1*	20	18				4th	**490**
2015	Dallara DW12	Honda HI15TT V6t	(Spain) Oriol Servià	32						29														32nd	**46**
2016					STP	PHX	LBH	ALA	IMS	INDY	DET		ROA	IOW	TOR	MDO	POC	TXS	WGL	SNM					
2016	Dallara DW12	Honda HI16TT V6t	(United States) Graham Rahal	15	16	5	15	2	4	14	4	11	3	16	13	4	11	1	21	2				5th	**484**
2016	Dallara DW12	Honda HI16TT V6t	(United States) Spencer Pigot **(R)**	16	14				11	25														21st	**165**
2017					STP	LBH	ALA	PHX	IMS	INDY	DET		TXS	ROA	IOW	TOR	MDO	POC	GAT	WGL	SNM				
2017	Dallara DW12	Honda HI17TT V6t	(Canada) Zachary Claman DeMelo **(R)**	13																	17			31st	**26**
2017	Dallara DW12	Honda HI17TT V6t	(United States) Graham Rahal	15	17	10	13	21	6	12	**1***	1*	4	8	5	9	3	9	12	5	6			6th	**522**
2017	Dallara DW12	Honda HI17TT V6t	(Spain) Oriol Servià	16						21	20	19												27th	**61**
2018					STP	PHX	LBH	ALA	IMS	INDY	DET		TXS	ROA	IOW	TOR	MDO	POC	GAT	POR	SNM				
2018	Dallara DW12	Honda HI18TT V6t	(United States) Graham Rahal	15	2	9	5	7	9	10	23	5	6	6	7	21	9	14	10	23	23			8th	**392**
2018	Dallara DW12	Honda HI18TT V6t	(Japan) Takuma Sato	30	12	11	21	8	10	32	5	17	7	4	3	22	17	21	9	1	25			12th	**351**
2018	Dallara DW12	Honda HI18TT V6t	(Spain) Oriol Servià^{4}	64						17														35th	**27**
2019					STP	COA	ALA	LBH	IMS	INDY	DET		TXS	ROA	TOR	IOW	MDO	POC	GAT	POR	LAG				
2019	Dallara DW12	Honda HI19TT V6t	(United States) Graham Rahal	15	12	4	23	4	9	27	7	7	3	4	9	8	9	9	18	23	12			10th	**389**
2019	Dallara DW12	Honda HI19TT V6t	(Japan) Takuma Sato	30	19	7	**1***	7	14	3	3	13	**15**	10	22	20	19	21	1	15	21			9th	**415**
2019	Dallara DW12	Honda HI19TT V6t	(United Kingdom) Jordan King **(R)**	42						24														36th	**12**
2020					TXS	IMS	ROA		IOW		INDY	GAT		MDO		IMS		STP							
2020	Dallara DW12	Honda HI20TT V6t	(United States) Graham Rahal	15	17	2	7	23	12	3	3	18	20	4	4	7	7	9						6th	**377**
2020	Dallara DW12	Honda HI20TT V6t	(Japan) Takuma Sato	30	DNS	10	9	8	10	21	1	2	**9***	17	18	18	14	10						7th	**348**
2020	Dallara DW12	Honda HI20TT V6t	(United States) Spencer Pigot	45		24					25													32nd	**17**
2021					ALA	STP	TXS		IMS	INDY	DET		ROA	MDO	NSH	IMS	GAT	POR	LAG	LBH					
2021	Dallara DW12	Honda HI21TT V6t	(United States) Graham Rahal	15	7	15	5	3	5	32	5	5	11	6	5	7	23	10	4	16				7th	**389**
2021	Dallara DW12	Honda HI21TT V6t	(Japan) Takuma Sato	30	13	6	9	14	16	14	4	12	8	10	25	10	6	12	27	9				11th	**324**
2021	Dallara DW12	Honda HI21TT V6t	(United States) Santino Ferrucci	45						6	6	10		9	11									24th	**146**
2021	Dallara DW12	Honda HI21TT V6t	(Denmark) Christian Lundgaard **(R)**	45												12								37th	**19**
2021	Dallara DW12	Honda HI21TT V6t	(United States) Oliver Askew	45														24	9	22				29th	**61**
2022					STP	TXS	LBH	ALA	IMS	INDY	DET	ROA	MDO	TOR	IOW		IMS	NSH	GAT	POR	LAG				
2022	Dallara DW12	Honda HI22TT V6t	(United States) Graham Rahal	15	7	22	7	8	16	14	26	8	12	4	9	14	7	23	10	5	18			11th	**345**
2022	Dallara DW12	Honda HI22TT V6t	(Denmark) Christian Lundgaard **(R)**	30	11	19	18	15	9	18	14	10	11	8	10	26	2	8	19	21	5			14th	**323**
2022	Dallara DW12	Honda HI22TT V6t	(United Kingdom) Jack Harvey	45	13	DNS	15	18	13	24	15	13	20	19	18	20	20	10	24	15	20			22nd	**209**
2022	Dallara DW12	Honda HI22TT V6t	(United States) Santino Ferrucci	45		9																		28th	**71**
2023					STP	TXS	LBH	ALA	IMS	INDY	DET	ROA	MDO	TOR	IOW		NSH	IMS	GAT	POR	LAG				
2023	Dallara DW12	Honda HI23TT V6t	(United States) Graham Rahal	15	6	24	12	17	10	DNQ	25	11	7	9	28	20	15	**2***	20	**12**	27			15th	**276***
2023	Dallara DW12	Honda HI23TT V6t	(United Kingdom) Jack Harvey	30	22	18	13	24	20	18	17	26	18	24	18	19	25	14						24th	**146**
2023	Dallara DW12	Honda HI23TT V6t	(United States) Conor Daly	30															16					25th	**134**
2023	Dallara DW12	Honda HI23TT V6t	(Estonia) Jüri Vips **(R)**	30																18	24			33rd	**18**
2023	Dallara DW12	Honda HI23TT V6t	(United Kingdom) Katherine Legge	44						33														37th	**5**
2023	Dallara DW12	Honda HI23TT V6t	(Denmark) Christian Lundgaard	45	9	19	14	6	**4**	19	16	7	4	**1***	20	13	9	4	17	11	6			8th	**390**
2024					STP	THE^{1}	LBH	ALA	IMS	INDY	DET	ROA	LAG	MDO	IOW		TOR	GAT	POR	MIL		NSH			
2024	Dallara DW12	Honda HI24TT V6t	(United States) Graham Rahal	15	14	11	17	11	9	15	15	10	23	18	16	8	10	23	9	20	23	23		18th	**197**
2024	Dallara DW12	Honda HI24TT V6t	(Brazil) Pietro Fittipaldi	30	13	12	24	27	14	32	13	16	14	24	19	20	19	14	25	18	21	21		19th	**186**
2024	Dallara DW12	Honda HI24TT V6t	(Denmark) Christian Lundgaard	45	18	9	23	6	3	13	11	11	15	7	22	17	7	15	13	9	12	19		11th	**312**
2024	Dallara DW12	Honda HI24TT V6t	(Japan) Takuma Sato	75						14														37th	**19**
2024	Dallara DW12	Honda HI24TT V6t	(Estonia) Jüri Vips **(R)**	75															19					39th	**11**
2025					STP	THE	LBH	ALA	IMS	INDY	DET	GAT	ROA	MDO	IOW		TOR	LAG	POR	MIL	NSH				
2025	Dallara DW12	Honda HI25TT V6t	(United States) Graham Rahal	15	12	11	22	14	6	17	20	22	20	24	11	19	7	12	4	24	22			19th	**260**
2025	Dallara DW12	Honda HI25TT V6t	(Canada) Devlin DeFrancesco	30	22	20	24	24	17	11	22	23	19	20	19	25	22	20	18	16	18			26th	**171**
2025	Dallara DW12	Honda HI25TT V6t	(United Kingdom) Louis Foster **(R)**	45	27	24	16	26	11	12	23	26	**11**	14	14	14	21	17	13	17	20			23rd	**213**
2025	Dallara DW12	Honda HI25TT V6t	(Japan) Takuma Sato	75						9														28th	**36**
2026					STP	PHX	ARL	ALA	LBH	IMS	INDY	DET	GAT	ROA	MOH	NSH	POR	MAR	D.C.	MIL		LAG			
2026	Dallara DW12	Honda HI26TT V6t	(United States) Graham Rahal	15	18	9	18	3	8	3	20	3	23	23	12	19	23	9	13	23	22	19		16th	**302**
2026	Dallara DW12	Honda HI26TT V6t	(United Kingdom) Louis Foster	45	14	23	13	25	16	7	21	7	20	14	18	17	15	**22***	18	11	10	14		18th	**267**
2026	Dallara DW12	Honda HI26TT V6t	(Germany) Mick Schumacher **(R)**	47	25	18	22	24	17	20	18	21	16	17	24	8	16	25	11	12	13	22		23rd	**213**
2026	Dallara DW12	Honda HI26TT V6t	(Japan) Takuma Sato	75							10													27th	**20**

* Season still in progress

1. Paul Dana was killed during the final practice session of the 2006 Toyota Indy 300.
2. Non-points paying, exhinition race.
3. The final race at Las Vegas was canceled due to Dan Wheldon's death.
4. Run in conjunction with Scuderia Corsa.

=== IndyCar wins ===
IndyCar wins
#	Season	Date	Sanction	Track / Race	No.	Winning driver	Chassis	Engine	Tire	Grid	Laps Led
1	1992	April 5	CART	Phoenix International Raceway **(O)**	12	(United States) Bobby Rahal	Lola T92/00	Chevrolet 265A V8t	Goodyear	2	200
2	1992	June 7	CART	Detroit Belle Isle Grand Prix **(S)**	12	(United States) Bobby Rahal (2)	Lola T92/00	Chevrolet 265A V8t	Goodyear	2	21
3	1992	July 5	CART	New Hampshire Motor Speedway **(O)**	12	(United States) Bobby Rahal (3)	Lola T92/00	Chevrolet 265A V8t	Goodyear	**Pole**	136
4	1992	October 4	CART	Nazareth Speedway **(O)**	12	(United States) Bobby Rahal (4)	Lola T92/00	Chevrolet 265A V8t	Goodyear	3	44
5	1998	September 13	CART	Laguna Seca Raceway **(R)**	8	(United States) Bryan Herta	Reynard 98i	Ford XD V8t	Firestone	**Pole**	81
6	1999	September 12	CART	Laguna Seca Raceway **(R)**	8	(United States) Bryan Herta (2)	Reynard 99i	Ford XD V8t	Firestone	**Pole**	83
7	2000	March 26	CART	Homestead–Miami Speedway **(O)**	7	(Italy) Max Papis	Reynard 2Ki	Ford XF V8t	Firestone	13	10
8	2001	May 18	CART	Twin Ring Motegi **(O)**	8	(Sweden) Kenny Bräck	Lola B01/00	Ford XF V8t	Firestone	6	75
9	2001	June 3	CART	Milwaukee Mile **(O)**	8	(Sweden) Kenny Bräck (2)	Lola B01/00	Ford XF V8t	Firestone	**Pole**	130
10	2001	June 24	CART	Portland International Raceway **(R)**	7	(Italy) Max Papis (2)	Lola B01/00	Ford XF V8t	Firestone	**Pole**	69
11	2001	July 29	CART	Chicago Motor Speedway **(O)**	8	(Sweden) Kenny Bräck (3)	Lola B01/00	Ford XF V8t	Firestone	8	59
12	2001	September 15	CART	EuroSpeedway Lausitz **(O)**	8	(Sweden) Kenny Bräck (4)	Lola B01/00	Ford XF V8t	Firestone	2	82
13	2001	October 14	CART	Laguna Seca Raceway **(R)**	7	(Italy) Max Papis (3)	Lola B01/00	Ford XF V8t	Firestone	25	16
14	2002	November 3	CART	Auto Club Speedway **(O)**	8	(United States) Jimmy Vasser	Lola B02/00	Ford XF V8t	Bridgestone	6	148
15	2003	May 31	CART	Milwaukee Mile **(O)**	9	(Mexico) Michel Jourdain Jr.	Lola B02/00	Ford XFE V8t	Bridgestone	2	234
16	2003	August 24	CART	Circuit Gilles Villeneuve **(R)**	9	(Mexico) Michel Jourdain Jr. (2)	Lola B02/00	Ford XFE V8t	Bridgestone	4	15
17	2004	May 30	IRL	Indianapolis 500 **(O)**	15	(United States) Buddy Rice	G-Force GF09B	Honda HI4R V8	Firestone	**Pole**	91
18	2004	July 4	IRL	Kansas Speedway **(O)**	15	(United States) Buddy Rice (2)	G-Force GF09B	Honda HI4R V8	Firestone	**Pole**	83
19	2004	August 1	IRL	Michigan International Speedway **(O)**	15	(United States) Buddy Rice (3)	G-Force GF09B	Honda HI4R V8	Firestone	6	13
20	2008	July 6	IRL	Watkins Glen International **(R)**	17	(United States) Ryan Hunter-Reay	Dallara IR-05	Honda HI8R V8	Firestone	3	9
21	2015	June 27	IndyCar	Auto Club Speedway **(O)**	15	(United States) Graham Rahal	Dallara DW12	Honda HI15TT V6t	Firestone	19	15
22	2015	August 2	IndyCar	Mid-Ohio Sports Car Course **(R)**	15	(United States) Graham Rahal (2)	Dallara DW12	Honda HI15TT V6t	Firestone	13	23
23	2016	August 27	IndyCar	Texas Motor Speedway **(O)**	15	(United States) Graham Rahal (3)	Dallara DW12	Honda HI16TT V6t	Firestone	13	1
24	2017	June 3	IndyCar	Detroit Belle Isle Grand Prix Race 1 **(S)**	15	(United States) Graham Rahal (4)	Dallara DW12	Honda HI16TT V6t	Firestone	**Pole**	55
25	2017	June 4	IndyCar	Detroit Belle Isle Grand Prix Race 2 **(S)**	15	(United States) Graham Rahal (5)	Dallara DW12	Honda HI17TT V6t	Firestone	3	41
26	2018	September 2	IndyCar	Portland International Raceway **(R)**	30	(Japan) Takuma Sato	Dallara DW12	Honda HI18TT V6t	Firestone	20	25
27	2019	April 7	IndyCar	Barber Motorsports Park **(R)**	30	(Japan) Takuma Sato (2)	Dallara DW12	Honda HI19TT V6t	Firestone	**Pole**	74
28	2019	August 24	IndyCar	Gateway Raceway **(O)**	30	(Japan) Takuma Sato (3)	Dallara DW12	Honda HI19TT V6t	Firestone	5	61
29	2020	August 23	IndyCar	Indianapolis 500 **(O)**	30	(Japan) Takuma Sato (4)	Dallara DW12	Honda HI20TT V6t	Firestone	3	27
30	2023	July 16	IndyCar	Grand Prix of Toronto **(S)**	45	(Denmark) Christian Lundgaard	Dallara DW12	Honda HI23R V6t	Firestone	**Pole**	54

== IMSA SportsCar Championship results ==
Year	Entrant	Class	Chassis	Engine	No	Drivers	1	2	3	4	5	6	7	8	9	10	11	Pos.	Pts.	EC
2014	(United States) BMW Team RLL	GTLM	BMW Z4 GTE	BMW 4.4 L V8	55	(United States) Bill Auberlen (United Kingdom) Andy Priaulx (United States) Joey Hand 3 (Belgium) Maxime Martin 1	DAY; 2	SEB; 3	LBH; 6	LGA; 2	WGL; 10	MOS; 6	IMS; 6	ELK; 8	VIR; 4	COA; 6	ATL; 10	7th	298	–
2014	(United States) BMW Team RLL	GTLM	BMW Z4 GTE	BMW 4.4 L V8	56	(United States) John Edwards (Germany) Dirk Müller (Germany) Dirk Werner 3 (United States) Graham Rahal 1	DAY; 4	SEB; 10	LBH; 2	LGA; 10	WGL; 6	MOS; 4	IMS; 7	ELK; 2	VIR; 3	COA; 7	ATL; 7	5th	300	–
2015	(United States) BMW Team RLL	GTLM	BMW Z4 GTE	BMW 4.4 L V8	24	(United States) John Edwards (Germany) Lucas Luhr (Germany) Jens Klingmann 3 (United States) Graham Rahal 1	DAY; 4	SEB; 4	LBH; 5	LGA; 1	WGL; 8	MOS; 2	ELK; 6	VIR; 4	COA; 7	ATL; 2		5th	291	25
2015	(United States) BMW Team RLL	GTLM	BMW Z4 GTE	BMW 4.4 L V8	25	(United States) Bill Auberlen (Germany) Dirk Werner (Brazil) Augusto Farfus 3 (Canada) Bruno Spengler 1	DAY; 2	SEB; 8	LBH; 1	LGA; 2	WGL; 3	MOS; 4	ELK; 5	VIR; 5	COA; 1	ATL; 4		2nd	305	26
2016	(United States) BMW Team RLL	GTLM	BMW M6 GTLM	BMW S63 4.4 L Turbo V8	25	(United States) Bill Auberlen (Germany) Dirk Werner (Canada) Bruno Spengler 2 (Brazil) Augusto Farfus 2	DAY; 5	SEB; 2	LBH; 5	LGA; 9	WGL; 3	MOS; 4	LIM; 7	ELK; 8	VIR; 5	COA; 4	ATL; 9	7th	298	32
2016	(United States) BMW Team RLL	GTLM	BMW M6 GTLM	BMW S63 4.4 L Turbo V8	100	(United States) John Edwards (Germany) Lucas Luhr (Canada) Kuno Wittmer 3 (United States) Graham Rahal 1	DAY; 11	SEB; 6	LBH; 10	LGA; 10	WGL; 8	MOS; 9	LIM; 9	ELK; 3	VIR; 8	COA; 7	ATL; 6	9th	267	26
2017	(United States) BMW Team RLL	GTLM	BMW M6 GTLM	BMW S63 4.4 L Turbo V8	191; 2510	(United States) Bill Auberlen (United Kingdom) Alexander Sims (Canada) Kuno Wittmer 2 (Brazil) Augusto Farfus 1 (Canada) Bruno Spengler 1	DAY; 8	SEB; 6	LBH; 4	COA; 2	WGL; 1	MOS; 1	LIM; 6	ELK; 6	VIR; 4	LGA; 8	ATL; 1	2nd	317	37
2017	(United States) BMW Team RLL	GTLM	BMW M6 GTLM	BMW S63 4.4 L Turbo V8	24	(United States) John Edwards (Germany) Martin Tomczyk (Netherlands) Nick Catsburg 3 (Canada) Kuno Wittmer 1	DAY; 11	SEB; 9	LBH; 7	COA; 3	WGL; 8	MOS; 2	LIM; 3	ELK; 7	VIR; 9	LGA; 1	ATL; 9	7th	284	24
2018	(United States) BMW Team RLL	GTLM	BMW M8 GTE	BMW S63 4.0 L Twin-turbo V8	24	(United States) John Edwards (Finland) Jesse Krohn (Netherlands) Nick Catsburg 2 (Brazil) Augusto Farfus 1 (United Kingdom) Tom Blomqvist 1 (Australia) Chaz Mostert 1	DAY; 7	SEB; 7	LBH; 5	MOH; 7	WGL; 8	MOS; 8	LIM; 8	ELK; 8	VIR; 3	LGA; 4	ATL; 3	8th	278	18
2018	(United States) BMW Team RLL	GTLM	BMW M8 GTE	BMW S63 4.0 L Twin-turbo V8	25	(United States) Connor De Phillippi (United Kingdom) Alexander Sims (United States) Bill Auberlen 4 (Austria) Philipp Eng 1	DAY; 9	SEB; 2	LBH; 8	MOH; 2	WGL; 7	MOS; 7	LIM; 7	ELK; 6	VIR; 1	LGA; 1	ATL; 4	6th	304	20
2019	(United States) BMW Team RLL	GTLM	BMW M8 GTE	BMW S63 4.0 L Turbo V8	24	(United States) John Edwards (Finland) Jesse Krohn (Austria) Philipp Eng 2 (Australia) Chaz Mostert 1 (Italy) Alex Zanardi 1	DAY; 9	SEB; 4	LBH; 8	MOH; 6	WGL; 5	MOS; 2	LIM; 8	ELK; 8	VIR; 8	LGA; 2	ATL; 9	7th	279	26
2019	(United States) BMW Team RLL	GTLM	BMW M8 GTE	BMW S63 4.0 L Turbo V8	25	(United States) Connor De Phillippi (United Kingdom) Tom Blomqvist 10 (United States) Colton Herta 3 (Austria) Philipp Eng 1 (Brazil) Augusto Farfus 1	DAY; 1	SEB; 7	LBH; 7	MOH; 4	WGL; 7	MOS; 4	LIM; 7	ELK; 5	VIR; 7	LGA; 5	ATL; 3	6th	293	29
2020	(United States) BMW Team RLL	GTLM	BMW M8 GTE	BMW S63 4.0 L Turbo V8	24	(United States) John Edwards (Finland) Jesse Krohn (Brazil) Augusto Farfus 3	DAY1; 1	DAY2; 6	SEB1; 5	ELK; 3	VIR; 6	ATL1; 3	MOH; 4	CLT; 2	ATL2; 3	LGA; 4	SEB2; 3	2nd	320	48
2020	(United States) BMW Team RLL	GTLM	BMW M8 GTE	BMW S63 4.0 L Turbo V8	25	(United States) Connor De Phillippi (Canada) Bruno Spengler (United States) Colton Herta 3 (Austria) Philipp Eng 1	DAY1; 5	DAY2; 4	SEB1; 4	ELK; 6	VIR; 2	ATL1; 1	MOH; 3	CLT; 3	ATL2; 6	LGA; 5	SEB2; 4	4th	313	30
2021	(United States) BMW Team RLL	GTLM	BMW M8 GTE	BMW S63 4.0 L Turbo V8	24	(United States) John Edwards (Brazil) Augusto Farfus (Finland) Jesse Krohn (Germany) Marco Wittmann 1	DAY; 3	SEB; 3	DET	WGL1; 2	WGL2	LIM	ELK	LGA	LBH	VIR	ATL; 3	4th	1336	35
2021	(United States) BMW Team RLL	GTLM	BMW M8 GTE	BMW S63 4.0 L Turbo V8	25	(United States) Connor De Phillippi (Austria) Philipp Eng (Canada) Bruno Spengler (Germany) Timo Glock 1	DAY; 5	SEB; 2	DET	WGL1; 3	WGL2	LIM	ELK	LGA	LBH	VIR	ATL; 5	5th	1251	35
2022	(United States) BMW Team RLL	GTD Pro	BMW M4 GT3	BMW P58 3.0 L Twin-turbo I6	24	(Austria) Philipp Eng (Germany) Marco Wittmann (United Kingdom) Nick Yelloly (South Africa) Sheldon van der Linde 1	DAY; 9	SEB; 4	LBH	LGA	WGL	MOS	LIM	ELK	VIR	ATL		10th	542	18
2022	(United States) BMW Team RLL	GTD Pro	BMW M4 GT3	BMW P58 3.0 L Twin-turbo I6	25	(United States) John Edwards (United States) Connor De Phillippi (Brazil) Augusto Farfus 3 (Finland) Jesse Krohn 2	DAY; 7	SEB; 10	LBH; 6	LGA; 3	WGL; 7^{†}	MOS; 5	LIM; 5	ELK; 5	VIR; 5	ATL; 2		5th	2872	29
2023	(United States) BMW M Team RLL	GTP	BMW M Hybrid V8	BMW P66/3 4.0 L Turbo V8	24	(Austria) Philipp Eng (Brazil) Augusto Farfus (Germany) Marco Wittmann 3 (United States) Colton Herta 1	DAY; 6	SEB; 8	LBH; 4	LGA; 5	WGL; 8	MOS; 8	ELK; 9	IMS; 10	ATL; 8			8th	2341	25
2023	(United States) BMW M Team RLL	GTP	BMW M Hybrid V8	BMW P66/3 4.0 L Turbo V8	25	(United States) Connor De Phillippi (United Kingdom) Nick Yelloly (South Africa) Sheldon van der Linde 3 (United States) Colton Herta 1	DAY; 9	SEB; 2	LBH; 2	LGA; 8	WGL; 1	MOS; 3	ELK; 10	IMS; 3	ATL; 7			6th	2687	29
2024	(United States) BMW M Team RLL	GTP	BMW M Hybrid V8	BMW P66/3 4.0 L Twin-turbo V8	24	(Austria) Philipp Eng (Finland) Jesse Krohn (Brazil) Augusto Farfus 3 (Belgium) Dries Vanthoor 1	DAY; 8	SEB; 6	LBH; 6	LGA; 9	DET; 7	WGL; 5	ELK; 7	IMS; 1	ATL; 4			7th	2537	31
2024	(United States) BMW M Team RLL	GTP	BMW M Hybrid V8	BMW P66/3 4.0 L Twin-turbo V8	25	(United States) Connor De Phillippi (United Kingdom) Nick Yelloly (Belgium) Maxime Martin 3 (Germany) René Rast 1	DAY; 7	SEB; 4	LBH; 9	LGA; 7	DET; 10	WGL; 6	ELK; 10	IMS; 2	ATL; 10			8th	2392	36
2025	(United States) BMW M Team RLL	GTP	BMW M Hybrid V8	BMW P66/3 4.0 L Turbo V8	24	(Austria) Philipp Eng (Belgium) Dries Vanthoor (Denmark) Kevin Magnussen 3 (Switzerland) Raffaele Marciello 1	DAY; 4	SEB; 12	LBH; 3	LGA; 3	DET; 5	WGL; 8	ELK; 1	IMS; 4	ATL; 9			4th	2679	30
2025	(United States) BMW M Team RLL	GTP	BMW M Hybrid V8	BMW P66/3 4.0 L Turbo V8	25	(South Africa) Sheldon van der Linde (Germany) Marco Wittmann (Netherlands) Robin Frijns 3 (Germany) René Rast 1	DAY; 7	SEB; 5	LBH; 5	LGA; 4	DET; 7	WGL; 12	ELK; 2	IMS; 6	ATL; 11			8th	2469	28
2026*	(United States) RLL Team McLaren	GTD Pro	McLaren 720S GT3 Evo	McLaren M840T 4.0 L Turbo V8	59	(United States) Max Esterson (United States) Nikita Johnson (United Kingdom) Dean MacDonald (Estonia) Jüri Vips	DAY; 12	SEB	LGA	DET	WGL	MOS	ELK	VIR	IMS	ATL		12th*	222*	8*

* Season still in progress
†: Post-event penalty. Car moved to back of class.

=== Complete Global Rallycross Championship results ===
(key)

==== Supercar ====
Year	Entrant	Car	No.	Driver	1	2	3	4	5	6	7	8	9	10	11	12	GRC	Points
2017	Rahal Letterman Lanigan Racing	Ford Fiesta ST	14	(United States) Austin Dyne	MEM	LOU; 6	THO1; 5	THO2; 7	OTT1; 5	OTT2; 6	INDY; 5	AC1; 7	AC2; 8	SEA1; 6	SEA2; 6	LA; 8	9th	562

=== Complete Jaguar I-Pace eTrophy results ===
(key)

Year	Car	Class	Tyres	No.	Drivers	1	2	3	4	5	6	7	8	9	10	Points	D.C.
2018–19	Jaguar I-PACE eTROPHY	P	M			ADR	MEX	HKG	SYX	RME	PAR	MCO	BER	NYC			
2018–19	Jaguar I-PACE eTROPHY	P	M	3	(United Kingdom) Katherine Legge	6^{5}	1^{1}	2^{2}	5^{5}	4^{4}	10^{5}	Ret	6^{6}	4^{4}	3^{3}	86	5th
2018–19	Jaguar I-PACE eTROPHY	P	M	6	(United States) Bryan Sellers	3^{3}	2^{2}	1^{1}	DSQ	2^{2}	1^{1}	3^{3}	4^{4}	DNS	5^{5}	107	3rd

Notes

* – Season still in progress.
