= Freddie Query =

American stock car racing driver

- Nationality: American
- Born: February 4, 1952 (age 74) Mooresville, North Carolina, U.S.

NASCAR Kodak Southeast Series
- Years active: 1993–2003
- Starts: 78
- Wins: 17
- Poles: 8
- Best finish: 1st in 1998

Previous series
- 1995–1997: USAR Hooters Late Model Series

Championship titles
- 1998: NASCAR Slim Jim All Pro Series

Freddie Query (born February 4, 1952) is an American former late model dirt track racing driver from Mooresville, North Carolina. He raced in the southeastern United States, primarily in North Carolina during the 80s and 90s. He raced in the NASCAR AutoZone Elite Division, Southeast Series. Query won the 1998 Slim Jim All Pro Series championship. He attempted to make one NASCAR Craftsman Truck Series race that year but did not qualify. Query had the most Super Late Model wins at Concord Motorsport Park. He became the general manager for Hank Parker Racing in 2000; the team closed operations three years later.

Query now owns a Track Operation Industry in Mooresville.

== Motorsports career results ==
=== NASCAR ===
(key) (Bold – Pole position awarded by qualifying time. Italics – Pole position earned by points standings or practice time. * – Most laps led.)

==== Winston Cup Series ====
NASCAR Winston Cup Series results
Year	Team	No.	Make	1	2	3	4	5	6	7	8	9	10	11	12	13	14	15	16	17	18	19	20	21	22	23	24	25	26	27	28	29	30	31	NWCC	Pts	Ref
1994	Gray Racing	62	Ford	DAY	CAR	RCH	ATL	DAR	BRI	NWS; DNQ	MAR	TAL	SON	CLT	DOV	POC	MCH	DAY	NHA	POC	TAL	IND	GLN	MCH	BRI	DAR	RCH	DOV	MAR	NWS	CLT	CAR	PHO	ATL	NA	-	

==== Busch Series ====
NASCAR Busch Series results
Year	Team	No.	Make	1	2	3	4	5	6	7	8	9	10	11	12	13	14	15	16	17	18	19	20	21	22	23	24	25	26	27	28	29	30	31	32	NBSC	Pts	Ref
1998	Whitaker Racing	7	Chevy	DAY	CAR	LVS	NSV	DAR	BRI	TEX	HCY	TAL	NHA	NZH	CLT	DOV	RCH	PPR	GLN	MLW	MYB	CAL	SBO	IRP	MCH	BRI	DAR	RCH	DOV	CLT	GTY	CAR	ATL	HOM; DNQ		NA	-	
1999	Premiere Motorsports	68	Ford	DAY; DNQ	CAR; DNQ	LVS; DNQ	ATL; DNQ	DAR; DNQ	TEX; Wth	NSV; DNQ	BRI; DNQ	TAL; DNQ	CAL; Wth	NHA; Wth	RCH; DNQ	NZH	CLT	DOV	SBO	GLN	MLW	MYB	PPR	GTY	IRP	MCH	BRI	DAR	RCH	DOV	CLT	CAR	MEM	PHO	HOM	NA	-	

==== Craftsman Truck Series ====
NASCAR Craftsman Truck Series results
Year	Team	No.	Make	1	2	3	4	5	6	7	8	9	10	11	12	13	14	15	16	17	18	19	20	21	22	23	24	25	26	27	NCTC	Pts	Ref
1995	Churchill Motorsports	88	Ford	PHO	TUS	SGS	MMR	POR	EVG	I70	LVL	BRI	MLW	CNS	HPT	IRP	FLM	RCH	MAR; DNQ	NWS	SON	MMR	PHO								102nd	40	
1998	Walker Evans Racing	20	Chevy	WDW; DNQ	HOM	PHO	POR	EVG	I70	GLN	TEX	BRI	MLW	NZH	CAL	PPR	IRP	NHA	FLM	NSV	HPT	LVL	RCH	MEM	GTY	MAR	SON	MMR	PHO	LVS	119th	40	
