= Barry Bodine =

American racing driver

- Born: Barry Eli Bodine; November 11, 1977 (age 48); Julian, North Carolina, U.S.

NASCAR FedEx Freight Truck Series career
- 29 races run over 7 years
- Best finish: 31st (1998)
- First race: 1995 Goody's 150 (Martinsville)
- Last race: 2002 Ford 200 (Homestead)
Wins	Top tens	Poles
0	0	0

Barry Eli Bodine (born November 11, 1977) is an American former stock car racing driver. He is the son of Geoff Bodine, and the nephew of Todd and Brett Bodine.

== Racing career ==
=== Busch Series ===
Bodine made his Busch debut in 1998, running the No. 05 Miccosukee Chevy at Homestead–Miami Speedway, starting 29th and finishing 31st.

Barry was scheduled to run about ten races in 1999, running his father's No. 64 Luxury Travel Motorcoaches Chevy. However, the team struggled to qualify and the plan was scrapped after Bodine only made three races. After finishes of 29th (Texas) and 25th (Nashville), Bodine had his best career finish of 12th at Talladega Superspeedway.

=== Craftsman Truck Series ===
Bodine made his CTS debut in 1995, driving his father's No. 07 truck at the age of 17. Bodine first ran at Martinsville, where he started 28th, but crashed out to 30th. He ran two more races in 1996 in the #07 QVC Ford. Despite a last place start at Martinsville, Bodine finished in 20th. His other outing was at North Wilkesboro, where he finished 23rd.

Bodine returned to competition seven times in 1997. He earned four top-20 finishes, with a best of 12th place at California. He also had two top-five starts, the best being a third at Las Vegas. However, he crashed out of that race, ending a run of four top-20s in five races. He finished 31st in 1998 points, as he completed eleven races, the most of his CTS career. He had his best career finish of 11th at Homestead and matched his best career start with a third place start at Texas.

Bodine returned to the series in 2000, splitting races with his father at Billy Ballew Motorsports. His father Geoff, however, was injured in the first race of the season at Daytona, and Barry's schedule was reduced to three starts, completing three straight events after Daytona. He had finishes of 13th at Miami, 17th at Phoenix and 23rd at Mesa Marin.

In 2001, Bodine ran a pair of races for Team Racing, making his debut in the season opener at Daytona. However, he was quickly involved in an accident and finished 36th. He then moved onto Homestead, where he earned a nice 12th-place finish. However, the deal did not materialize in any more races, and Bodine did not make any more starts.

Bodine ran three races in 2002, two for E. J. Prescott and one for Team Racing. He finished both races for EJP, with a 26th at Richmond and a 16th at Homestead. He was 31st in the race for Team Racing at Texas.

Bodine has not raced in any series of NASCAR since the season finale of the CTS in 2002.

== Motorsports career results ==
=== NASCAR ===
(key) (Bold – Pole position awarded by qualifying time. Italics – Pole position earned by points standings or practice time. * – Most laps led.)

==== Busch Series ====
NASCAR Busch Series results
Year	Team	No.	Make	1	2	3	4	5	6	7	8	9	10	11	12	13	14	15	16	17	18	19	20	21	22	23	24	25	26	27	28	29	30	31	32	NBSC	Pts	Ref
1998	Prime Performance Motorsports	05	Chevy	DAY	CAR	LVS	NSV	DAR	BRI	TEX	HCY	TAL	NHA	NZH	CLT	DOV	RCH	PPR	GLN	MLW	MYB	CAL	SBO	IRP	MCH	BRI	DAR	RCH	DOV	CLT	GTY	CAR	ATL	HOM; 31		110th	70	
1999	Shoemaker Racing	64	Chevy	DAY; DNQ	CAR	LVS	ATL	DAR	TEX; 29	NSV; 25	BRI	TAL; 12	CAL	NHA	RCH	NZH	CLT	DOV	SBO	GLN	MLW	MYB	PPR	GTY	IRP	MCH	BRI	DAR	RCH	DOV	CLT	CAR	MEM	PHO		78th	296	
1999	Joe Bessey Motorsports	6	Chevy																																HOM; DNQ	78th	296	

==== Craftsman Truck Series ====
NASCAR Craftsman Truck Series results
Year	Team	No.	Make	1	2	3	4	5	6	7	8	9	10	11	12	13	14	15	16	17	18	19	20	21	22	23	24	25	26	27	NCTC	Pts	Ref
1995	Geoff Bodine Racing	07	Ford	PHO	TUS	SGS	MMR	POR	EVG	I70	LVL	BRI	MLW	CNS	HPT	IRP	FLM	RCH	MAR; 30	NWS	SON	MMR	PHO								98th	73	
1996	Geoff Bodine Racing	07	Ford	HOM	PHO	POR	EVG	TUS	CNS	HPT	BRI	NZH	MLW	LVL	I70	IRP	FLM	GLN	NSV	RCH	NHA	MAR; 20	NWS; 23	SON	MMR	PHO	LVS				77th	197	
1997	Geoff Bodine Racing	07	Ford	WDW	TUS	HOM; 27	PHO	POR	EVG	I70	NHA	TEX	BRI	NZH	MLW	LVL	CNS	HPT	IRP	FLM											36th	688	
1997	Geoff Bodine Racing	7	Ford																		NSV; 20	GLN	RCH; 25	MAR; 17	SON	MMR	CAL; 12	PHO; 16	LVS; 34		36th	688	
1998	Mattei Motorsports	7	Ford	WDW; 35																											31st	1017	
1998	Prime Performance Motorsports	7	Chevy		HOM; 11	PHO	POR	EVG	I70	GLN; 17	TEX; 27	BRI	MLW; DNQ	NZH; 24	CAL; 35	PPR; 14	IRP	NHA; 21	FLM; 23	NSV; 33	HPT	LVL	RCH; 33	MEM	GTY	MAR	SON	MMR	PHO	LVS	31st	1017	
2000	Billy Ballew Motorsports	15	Ford	DAY	HOM; 13	PHO; 17	MMR; 23	MAR	PIR	GTY	MEM	PPR	EVG	TEX	KEN	GLN	MLW	NHA	NZH	MCH	IRP	NSV	CIC	RCH	DOV	TEX	CAL				57th	330	
2001	Impact Motorsports	25	Ford	DAY; 36																											72nd	182	
2001	Impact Motorsports	25	Dodge		HOM; 12	MMR	MAR	GTY	DAR	PPR	DOV	TEX	MEM	MLW	KAN	KEN	NHA	IRP	NSH	CIC	NZH	RCH	SBO	TEX	LVS	PHO	CAL				72nd	182	
2002	Team EJP	03	Chevy	DAY	DAR	MAR	GTY	PPR	DOV	TEX	MEM	MLW	KAN	KEN	NHA	MCH	IRP	NSH	RCH; 26						HOM; 16						59th	270	
2002	Team Racing	25	Chevy																	TEX; 31	SBO	LVS	CAL	PHO							59th	270	
