= Wally Dallenbach Jr. =

American racing driver (born 1963)

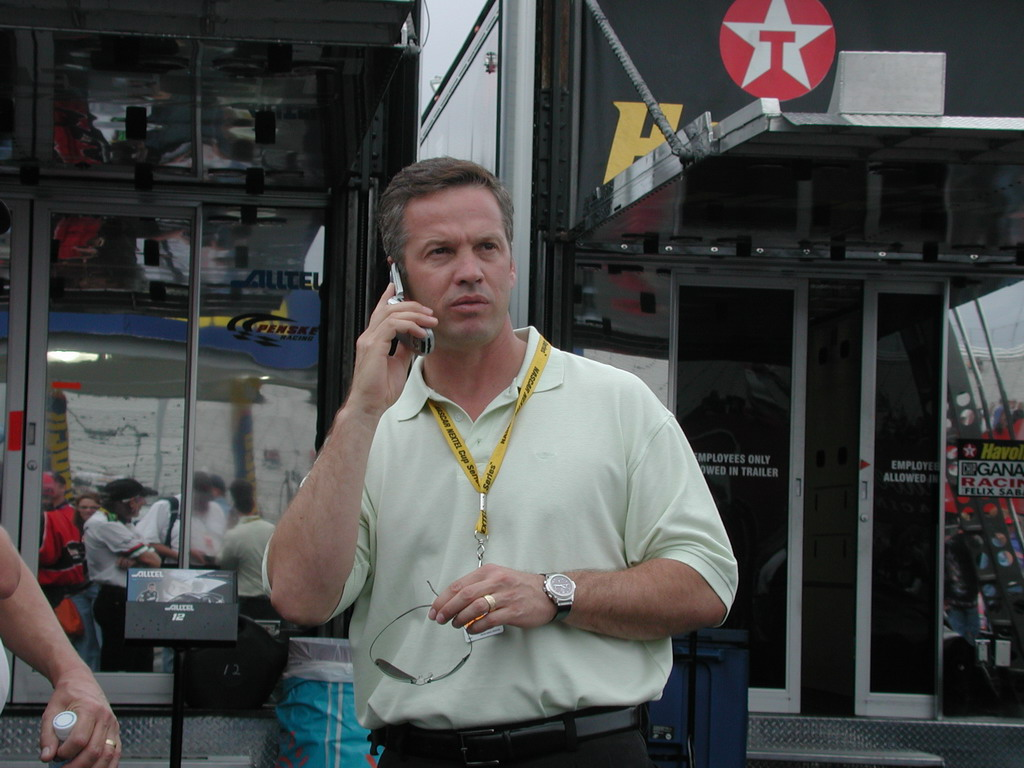
- Dallenbach in 2004
- Born: Wallace Paul Dallenbach; May 23, 1963 (age 63); Basalt, Colorado, U.S.
- Achievements: 1985, 1986 Trans-Am Series champion Four class wins at 24 Hours of Daytona; Three class wins at 12 Hours of Sebring
- Awards: 2025 Trans-Am Series Hall of Fame inductee

NASCAR Cup Series career
- 226 races run over 11 years
- Best finish: 18th (1999)
- First race: 1991 Motorcraft Quality Parts 500 (Atlanta)
- Last race: 2001 Pocono 500 (Pocono)
Wins	Top tens	Poles
0	23	0

NASCAR O'Reilly Auto Parts Series career
- 16 races run over 4 years
- Best finish: 61st (2004)
- First race: 2002 Cabela's 250 (Michigan)
- Last race: 2005 Ameriquest 300 (California)
Wins	Top tens	Poles
0	3	0

NASCAR FedEx Freight Truck Series career
- 2 races run over 2 years
- Best finish: 68th (1995)
- First race: 1995 Subway 100 (Sonoma)
- Last race: 1996 Lund Look 225 (Topeka)
Wins	Top tens	Poles
0	1	0
- Statistics up to date as of February 5, 2025.

Wallace Paul Dallenbach (born May 23, 1963) is an American former racing driver. He competed in the NASCAR Cup Series, and is known for his prowess as a road racer. In addition to NASCAR, Dallenbach has raced in SCCA Trans-Am, IMSA Camel GT, CART, and the Pikes Peak International Hill Climb.

Dallenbach is the son of Indy car driver and official Wallace Jacob Dallenbach. After the younger Dallenbach began a professional racing career during the middle 1980s, he came to be known by the retronym Dallenbach Jr.

Mostly retired from full-time driving, Dallenbach was a race commentator for NBC Sports and Turner Sports. His primary responsibilities are for TNT's NASCAR coverage, a position he had held since 2001, and NBC Sports Network's IndyCar Series coverage, which he has been a part of since NBC was bought by Comcast in 2010 until 2014. Dallenbach worked with Adam Alexander and Kyle Petty on TNT and with Leigh Diffey and Jon Beekhuis on NBC Sports Network. In 2015, Dallenbach joined Fox NASCAR on NASCAR Race Hub.

== Racing career ==
=== Early career ===
Dallenbach was born in Basalt, Colorado. He grew up in Denver with his father Wally Dallenbach Sr. and mother. After graduating high school, Dallenbach left Colorado for North Carolina to start a racing career. He began his pro racing career in the SCCA Trans-Am Series. Immediately he won the Rookie-of-the Year title in 1984, and followed that up with two Trans-Am championships. The first one in 1985 driving for Jack Roush in a Mercury Capri. This made Dallenbach the youngest Trans-Am champion at the age of just 22 years. The following year Dallenbach joined the Protofab team and drove their Camaros to another championship. The success garnered him an invitation to race in the International Race of Champions in 1987. Dallenbach followed up those accomplishments by winning the 24 Hours of Daytona four times and the 12 Hours of Sebring three times. He later drove in the GTO class of the IMSA GT championship, finishing runner-up in the standings in 1988 (driving for Jack Roush) and 1989.

=== IndyCar ===
Initially, Dallenbach followed the steps of his father by pursuing an open-wheel career, taking part the inaugural round of the American Racing Series in 1986, on which he raced four more times over the following two seasons, finishing 3rd at Phoenix in 1988. One year before, he had made his CART Indy Car debut at Road America subbing for driver-owner Dick Simon, who had undergone an arm surgery after a fall off his motorbike. After qualifying seventeenth, Dallenbach went off the track late in the race and retired, though he was classified in the twelfth and final points paying place. Three years later, in 1990, he took part in three road course races at the end of the season for the Leader Cards team, in place of the departing Pancho Carter, with an 11th place finish at Denver followed by engine failures at Mid-Ohio and Laguna Seca.

=== NASCAR ===
By 1991, Dallenbach was ready and made the jump to the world of NASCAR, racing in the Winston Cup Series. He made eleven starts that year driving one of Junie Donlavey's Fords. In 1992, former boss Jack Roush called Dallenbach up to have him drive as a teammate to Mark Martin in the No. 16 Ford. He drove for Roush during the 1992 and 1993 seasons, finishing second at Watkins Glen 1993, fifth at the 1991 Watkins Glen race, seventh at 1996 Sonoma, and tenth at the 1993 Daytona 500 and 1993 Talladega 500.

In 1994, Richard Petty put Dallenbach in the famous No. 43 Pontiac. He was the second driver other than Petty to drive the No. 43. (Note: The no. 43 car was temporarily renumbered as no. 44 during the 1993 season) Dallenbach finished fourth at Sonoma, eighth at Talladega and tenth at Dover, but was released part way through the season. 1995 was an up-and-down year for Dallenbach, as he did not have a full-time ride. However, a one race deal with Bill Davis in the No. 22 Pontiac almost got Dallenbach his first Cup win at Watkins Glen, but he fell in the closing laps to finish in second.

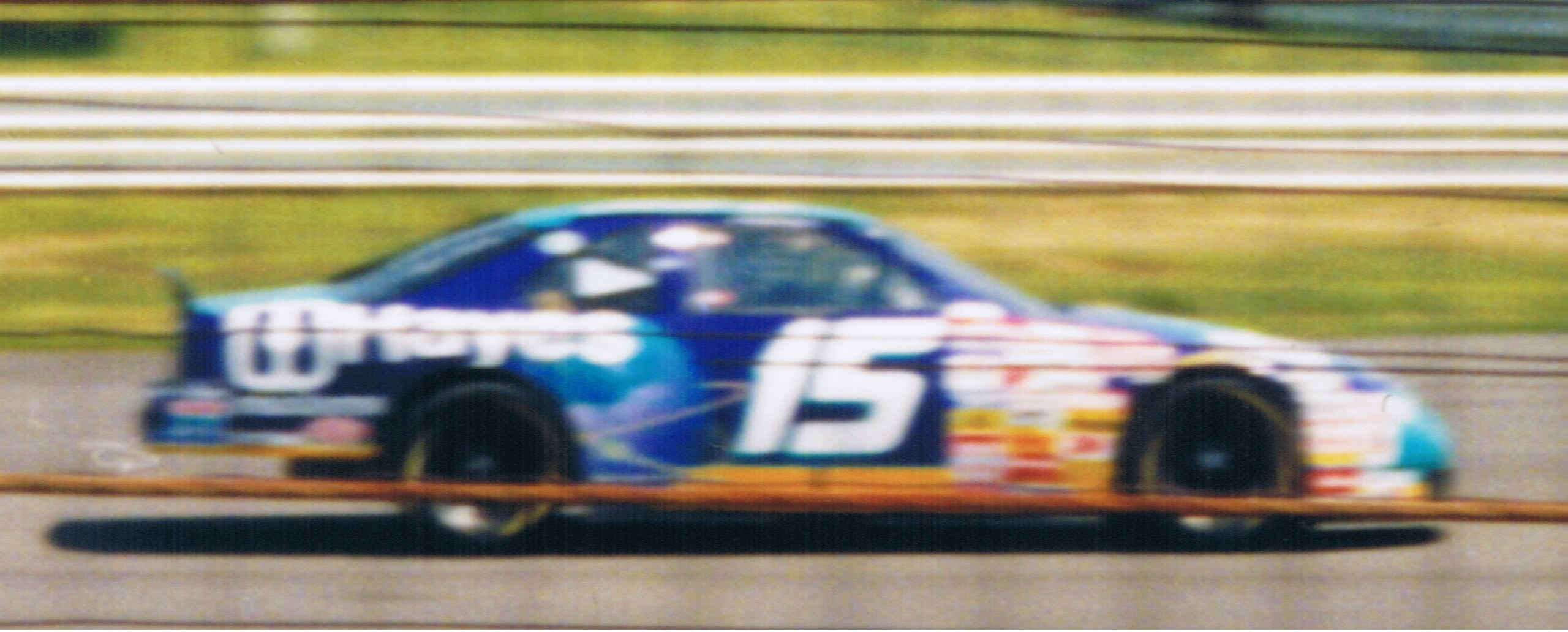
Dallenbach's 1996 Winston Cup car at Pocono Raceway

The following years saw Dallenbach jumping around to different rides. He was considered one of the better road course drivers and was often recruited to drive at such tracks as Sonoma and Watkins Glen, as many drivers struggled on these more demanding tracks. In 1996 he drove the No. 15 Ford for Bud Moore Engineering, finishing sixth at the Daytona 500, third at Sonoma and tenth at Watkins Glen. Then he drove the No. 46 First Union-sponsored Chevrolet for Felix Sabates from 1997 through part of 1998, claiming a tenth-place finish at the 1997 Watkins Glen race.

Later in 1998, Dallenbach stepped in to sub for Ricky Craven in the No. 50 Chevrolet for Hendrick Motorsports. The combination worked out well, earning three top 10s, and Dallenbach signed on to drive the No. 25 Chevrolet for 1999. It resulted in his best position in the standings of eighteenth with six top tens.

In 2000, Dallenbach joined the new Galaxy Motorsports and drove the No. 75 Ford. It was a difficult season, with a best result of ninth at Watkins Glen. In addition, promised sponsor opportunities fell through, leaving Dallenbach without a ride right before the 2001 season was to begin. In fact, Dallenbach was listed in several season preview media sources, despite never attempting a single race that season. Dallenbach would also sub for Joe Nemechek in the Pocono event in 2001.

=== 2021 ===
Dallenbach made his return to racing in 2021 in the Trans-Am TAH subcategory of the TA class with the Ultimate Headers Racing Team under the ownership of John & Debbie Cloud.

== Broadcasting career ==
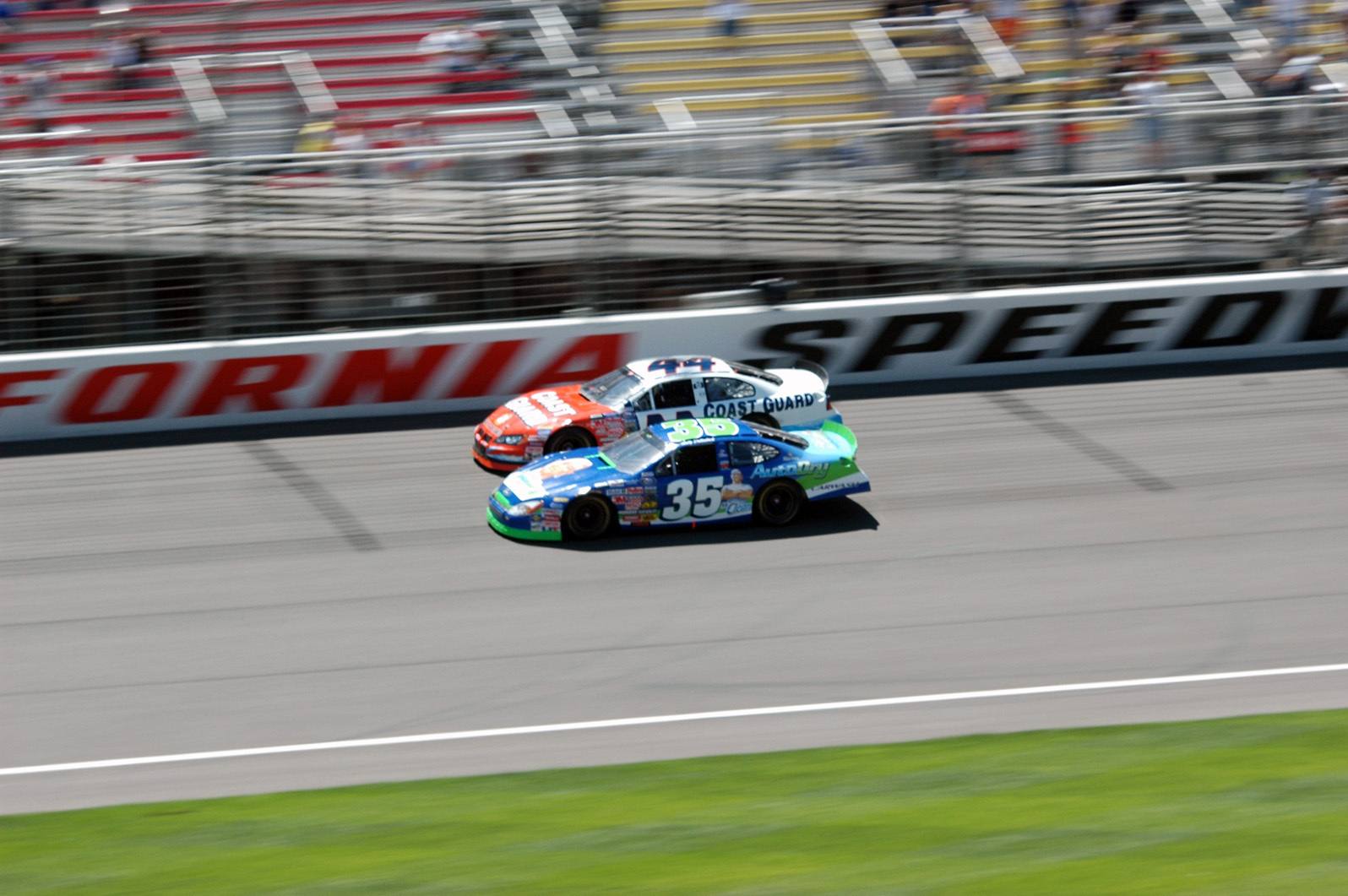
Dallenbach in the No. 35 competing in the Busch Series at Fontana in 2004

Without a ride, Dallenbach took up TV commentating in 2001, covering the NASCAR races for NBC and TNT alongside Allen Bestwick (later Bill Weber, then Adam Alexander) and Benny Parsons (later Kyle Petty). In doing so, he became known for his pre-race "Wally's World" segment, where he takes celebrities for a ride around the track. The commentating also allowed Dallenbach to drive in a few Busch Series races and do some live commentary from the car. Dallenbach and Weber also teamed up to commentate several Championship Off-Road Racing events, with Dallenbach pre-running the track in a Pro-4 truck. With the NBC and TNT partnership splitting at the end of the 2006 season, Dallenbach stayed with TNT's new six-race package, and also reunited with Weber during NBC Champ Car broadcasts.

Dallenbach has since run Daytona Prototypes with his brother Paul at the 24 Hours of Daytona and in 2006, won the open wheel division at the Pikes Peak International Hillclimb with Paul finishing right behind in second. On September 22, 2014, Dallenbach announced he would return to Trans-Am for the season finale at Daytona in the TA2 class, stating the "broadcasting phase of my life is over".

== Personal life ==
Dallenbach was married to Robin Dallenbach, until 2016. Robin is the daughter of drag racing driver, engine builder, and team owner Bob McCall. Their daughter Kate Dallenbach was a member of Richard Childress Racing's driver development program.

== Awards and honors ==
- Pikes Peak Hill Climb Museum Hall of Fame (2022)
- Trans-Am Series Hall of Fame (2025)

== Motorsports career results ==
=== American open–wheel results ===
(key) (Races in bold indicate pole position)

==== Complete CART Indy Car results ====
Year	Team	1	2	3	4	5	6	7	8	9	10	11	12	13	14	15	16	Rank	Points	Ref
1987	Dick Simon Racing	LBC	PHX	INDY	MIL	POR	MEA	CLE	TOR	MIS	POC	ROA; 12	MDO	NAZ	LAG	MIA		**37th**	**1**	
1990	Leader Card Racing	PHX	LBG	INDY	MIL	DET	POR	CLE	MEA	TOR	MIS	DEN; 11	VAN	MDO; 18	ROA	NAZ	LAG; 25	**27th**	**2**	

=== NASCAR ===
(key) (Bold – Pole position awarded by qualifying time. Italics – Pole position earned by points standings or practice time. * – Most laps led.)

==== Winston Cup Series ====
NASCAR Winston Cup Series results
Year	Team	No.	Make	1	2	3	4	5	6	7	8	9	10	11	12	13	14	15	16	17	18	19	20	21	22	23	24	25	26	27	28	29	30	31	32	33	34	35	36	NWCC	Pts	Ref
1991	Donlavey Racing	90	Ford	DAY	RCH	CAR	ATL; 26	DAR	BRI	NWS	MAR	TAL; 34	CLT; 33	DOV	SON	POC	MCH; 28	DAY; 34	POC	TAL; 41	GLN; 32	MCH; 22	BRI	DAR	RCH; 25	DOV	MAR	NWS	CLT; 19	CAR	PHO	ATL; 36								38th	803	
1992	Roush Racing	16	Ford	DAY; 15	CAR; 21	RCH; 24	ATL; 27	DAR; 30	BRI; 22	NWS; 30	MAR; 19	TAL; 14	CLT; 28	DOV; 34	SON; 25	POC; 27	MCH; 18	DAY; 11	POC; 32	TAL; 14	GLN; 5	MCH; 20	BRI; 19	DAR; 24	RCH; 23	DOV; 31	MAR; 14	NWS; 24	CLT; 20	CAR; 23	PHO; 12	ATL; 38								24th	2799	
1993	Roush Racing	16	Ford	DAY; 10	CAR; 20	RCH; 27	ATL; 25	DAR; 13	BRI; 11	NWS; 21	MAR; 34	TAL; 29	SON; 7	CLT; 40	DOV; 12	POC; 25	MCH; 25	DAY; 35	NHA; 27	POC; 17	TAL; 10	GLN; 2	MCH; 31	BRI; 21	DAR; 11	RCH; 15	DOV; 15	MAR; 27	NWS; 15	CLT; 24	CAR; 31	PHO; 34	ATL; 33							22nd	2978	
1994	Petty Enterprises	43	Pontiac	DAY; 17	CAR; 27	RCH; DNQ	ATL; DNQ	DAR; 41	BRI; 17	NWS; 16	MAR; DNQ	TAL; 41	SON; 4	CLT; 25	DOV; 10	POC; 17	MCH; DNQ	DAY; DNQ	NHA; DNQ	POC; 16	TAL; 8	IND; 23	GLN; 14	MCH	BRI	DAR	RCH	DOV	MAR	NWS	CLT	CAR	PHO	ATL						38th	1493	
1995	Strauser Racing	45	Chevy	DAY	CAR	RCH	ATL	DAR	BRI	NWS	MAR	TAL	SON; 39	CLT	DOV	POC	MCH	DAY	NHA	POC	TAL	IND																		50th	221	
1995	Bill Davis Racing	22	Pontiac																				GLN; 2	MCH	BRI	DAR	RCH	DOV	MAR	NWS	CLT	CAR	PHO	ATL						50th	221	
1996	Bud Moore Engineering	15	Ford	DAY; 6	CAR; 23	RCH; 40	ATL; 20	DAR; 37	BRI; 24	NWS; 28	MAR; DNQ	TAL; 12	SON; 3	CLT; 19	DOV; 22	POC; 12	MCH; 13	DAY; 12	NHA; 18	POC; 33	TAL; 32	IND; 17	GLN; 10	MCH; 34	BRI; 25	DAR; 25	RCH; 33	DOV; 29	MAR; 22	NWS; 34	CLT; 33	CAR; 36	PHO; 15	ATL; 40						25th	2786	
1997	Team SABCO	46	Chevy	DAY; 42	CAR	RCH	ATL; DNQ	DAR	TEX; DNQ	BRI	MAR	SON; 15	TAL; 17	CLT; 35		POC; 17	MCH; 20	CAL; 39	DAY; 39	NHA	POC; 38	IND; 36	GLN; 10	MCH; 41	BRI; 26	DAR; 41	RCH; 41	NHA; 31	DOV	MAR; 34	CLT; 37	TAL; 41	CAR; 35	PHO; DNQ	ATL; 38					41st	1475	
1997	Team SABCO	40	Chevy												DOV; 36																									41st	1475	
1998	Team SABCO	46	Chevy	DAY; DNQ	CAR; DNQ	LVS; 38	ATL; 39	DAR; DNQ	BRI	TEX; 19	MAR; DNQ	TAL; 26																												38th	1832	
1998	ISM Racing	35	Pontiac										CAL; 29	CLT	DOV	RCH																								38th	1832	
1998	Hendrick Motorsports	50	Chevy														MCH; 10	POC; 7	SON; 27	NHA				MCH; 8	BRI; 28	NHA; 43	DAR; 31	RCH; 30	DOV; 25	MAR; 32	CLT; 23	TAL; 39	DAY; 30	PHO; 25	CAR; 36	ATL; 25				38th	1832	
1998	Elliott-Marino Racing	13	Ford																		POC; 25	IND; 40	GLN																	38th	1832	
1999	Hendrick Motorsports	25	Chevy	DAY; 12	CAR; 17	LVS; 13	ATL; 39	DAR; 38	TEX; 23	BRI; 30	MAR; 18	TAL; 20	CAL; 8	RCH; 20	CLT; 21	DOV; 20	MCH; 14	POC; 39	SON; 41	DAY; 26	NHA; 7	POC; 5	IND; 14	GLN; 7	MCH; 23	BRI; 28	DAR; 21	RCH; 28	NHA; 22	DOV; 15	MAR; 22	CLT; 33	TAL; 35	CAR; 39	PHO; 9	HOM; 9	ATL; 23			18th	3367	
2000	Galaxy Motorsports	75	Ford	DAY; 40	CAR; 20	LVS; 35	ATL; 39	DAR; DNQ	BRI; 29	TEX; DNQ	MAR; DNQ	TAL; 16	CAL; 27	RCH; 16	CLT; 28	DOV; 24	MCH; 34	POC; 39	SON; 40	DAY; 21	NHA; 27	POC; 31	IND; 35	GLN; 9	MCH; 25	BRI; 33	DAR; 19	RCH; 23	NHA; 39	DOV; 21	MAR; 40	CLT; 33	TAL; DNQ	CAR; 22	PHO; 22	HOM; 35	ATL; 29			34th	2344	
2001	Andy Petree Racing	33	Chevy	DAY	CAR	LVS	ATL	DAR	BRI	TEX	MAR	TAL	CAL	RCH	CLT	DOV	MCH	POC; 26	SON	DAY	CHI	NHA	POC	IND																64th	85	
2001	Petty Enterprises	44	Dodge																						GLN; DNQ	MCH	BRI	DAR	RCH	DOV	KAN	CLT	MAR	TAL	PHO	CAR	HOM	ATL	NHA	64th	85	

===== Daytona 500 results =====
Year	Team	Manufacturer	Start	Finish
1992	Roush Racing	Ford	37	15
1993	Roush Racing	Ford	22	10
1994	Petty Enterprises	Pontiac	18	17
1996	Bud Moore Engineering	Ford	9	6
1997	Team SABCO	Chevrolet	26	42
1998	Team SABCO	Chevrolet	DNQ	
1999	Hendrick Motorsports	Chevrolet	34	12
2000	Galaxy Motorsports	Ford	34	40

==== Busch Series ====
NASCAR Busch Series results
Year	Team	No.	Make	1	2	3	4	5	6	7	8	9	10	11	12	13	14	15	16	17	18	19	20	21	22	23	24	25	26	27	28	29	30	31	32	33	34	35	NBSC	Pts	Ref
2002	Tommy Baldwin Racing	6	Dodge	DAY	CAR	LVS	DAR	BRI	TEX	NSH	TAL	CAL	RCH	NHA	NZH	CLT	DOV	NSH	KEN	MLW	DAY	CHI	GTY	PPR	IRP	MCH; 14	BRI	DAR	RCH	DOV	KAN	CLT; 7	MEM	ATL	CAR	PHO; 9	HOM		62nd	405	
2003	Reiser Enterprises	17	Ford	DAY	CAR	LVS	DAR	BRI	TEX	TAL	NSH	CAL	RCH	GTY	NZH	CLT	DOV	NSH	KEN; 12	MLW	DAY	CHI	NHA	PPR	IRP	MCH	BRI	DAR	RCH	DOV									73rd	434	
2003	Reiser Enterprises	89	Ford																												KAN; 17	CLT	MEM	ATL; 36	PHO; 37	CAR	HOM; 25		73rd	434	
2004	NEMCO Motorsports	88	Pontiac	DAY; 42	CAR	LVS	DAR	BRI	TEX	NSH	TAL	CAL	GTY	RCH	NZH	CLT	DOV	NSH	KEN	MLW	DAY	CHI	NHA	PPR	IRP	MCH	BRI												61st	484	
2004	Team Rensi Motorsports	35	Ford																									CAL; 20	RCH	DOV	KAN; 10	CLT; 40	MEM	ATL	PHO; 24	DAR	HOM; 29		61st	484	
2005	Kevin Harvick Inc.	83	Chevy	DAY	CAL	MXC	LVS	ATL	NSH	BRI	TEX	PHO	TAL	DAR	RCH	CLT	DOV	NSH	KEN	MLW	DAY	CHI	NHA	PPR	GTY	IRP	GLN; 34	MCH	BRI	CAL; 30	RCH	DOV	KAN	CLT	MEM	TEX	PHO	HOM	100th	134	

==== Craftsman Truck Series ====
NASCAR Craftsman Truck Series results
Year	Team	No.	Make	1	2	3	4	5	6	7	8	9	10	11	12	13	14	15	16	17	18	19	20	21	22	23	24	NCTSC	Pts	Ref
1995	Roehrig Motorsports	18	Chevy	PHO	TUS	SGS	MMR	POR	EVG	I70	LVL	BRI	MLW	CNS	HPT	IRP	FLM	RCH	MAR	NWS	SON; 2	MMR	PHO					68th	170	
1996	Chesrown Racing	66	Chevy	HOM	PHO	POR	EVG	TUS	CNS	HPT; 25	BRI	NZH	MLW	LVL	I70	IRP	FLM	GLN	NSV	RCH	NHA	MAR	NWS	SON	MMR	PHO	LVS	112th	88	

== Notes ==
Sporting positions
Preceded by Tom Gloy	Trans-Am Series Champion; 1985, 1986	Succeeded by Scott Pruett
