= Ernest Winslow =

American racing driver

- Born: May 22, 1962 (age 64); Scotland Neck, North Carolina, U.S.

NASCAR FedEx Freight Truck Series career
- 1 race run over 1 year
- Best finish: 59th (1995)
- First race: 1995 Lowe's 150 (North Wilkesboro)
Wins	Top tens	Poles
0	0	0
- Statistics up to date as of January 4, 2025.

Ernest Winslow (born May 22, 1962) is an American former professional stock car racing driver who has competed in the NASCAR Craftsman Truck Series and the NASCAR Goody's Dash Series.

Winslow has also previously competed in the UARA STARS Late Model Series.

== Motorsports results ==
=== NASCAR ===
(key) (Bold - Pole position awarded by qualifying time. Italics - Pole position earned by points standings or practice time. * – Most laps led.)

==== Craftsman Truck Series ====
NASCAR Craftsman Truck Series results
Year	Team	No.	Make	1	2	3	4	5	6	7	8	9	10	11	12	13	14	15	16	17	18	19	20	21	22	23	24	NCTC	Pts	Ref
1995	Ernest Winslow	68	Chevy	PHO	TUS	SGS	MMR	POR	EVG	I70	LVL	BRI	MLW	CNS	HPT	IRP	FLM	RCH; DNQ	MAR	NWS; 26	SON	MMR	PHO; DNQ					59th	220	
1996	Ernest Winslow	68	Chevy	HOM; Wth	PHO	POR	EVG	TUS	CNS	HPT	BRI	NZH	MLW	LVL	I70	IRP	FLM	GLN	NSV	RCH	NHA							N/A	0	
1996	Randy Dixon	04	N/A																			MAR; DNQ	NWS; DNQ	SON	MMR	PHO	LVS	N/A	0	

==== Goody's Dash Series ====
NASCAR Goody's Dash Series results
Year	Team	No.	Make	1	2	3	4	5	6	7	8	9	10	11	12	13	14	15	16	17	18	19	NGDS	Pts	Ref
1992	Ernest Winslow	68	Pontiac	DAY; 36	HCY	LON	FLO	LAN	SUM	STH	BGS				ACE; 3	HCY; 15	VOL; 6						25th	606	
1992	Ernest Winslow	68	Chevy									MYB; 15	NRV	SUM									25th	606	
1993	Ernest Winslow	68	Pontiac	DAY; 8	NSV; 18	SUM	VOL									MYB; 10	NRV; 5	HCY	VOL; 1				16th	885	
1993	Ernest Winslow	68	Chevy					MAR; 3	LON	411	LAN	HCY	SUM	FLO	BGS								16th	885	
1994	Ernest Winslow	68	Chevy	DAY; 12	VOL; 20	FLO; 19	SUM; 7	CAR; 17	411; 3	HCY; 23	LAN; 3	BRI; 6	SUM; 2	FLO; 2	BGS; 11	MYB; 18	NRV; 1**	ASH; 15	VOL; 16	HCY; 1*			6th	2340	
1995	N/A	69	Chevy	DAY	FLO	LAN; 23	MYB; 27	SUM	HCY; 28	CAR; 18	STH; 20	BRI; 23	SUM	GRE; 23	BGS	MYB	NSV	FLO	NWS	VOL	HCY	HOM	29th	652	
2000	N/A	12	Pontiac	DAY; 35	MON	STA	JAC	CAR															28th	676	
2000	N/A	77	Toyota						CLT; 29	SBO; 22	ROU; 13	LOU; 17	SUM; 17	GRE; 22	SNM	MYB	BRI	HCY	JAC	USA	LAN		28th	676	
