= Randy Churchill =

Canadian racing driver

- Born: December 29, 1960 (age 65); Windsor, Ontario, Canada

NASCAR FedEx Freight Truck Series career
- 3 races run over 2 years
- Best finish: 47th (1995)
- First race: 1995 Western Auto 200 (I-70)
- Last race: 1995 Pizza Plus 150 (Bristol)
Wins	Top tens	Poles
0	1	0

Randy Churchill (born December 29, 1960) is a Canadian former stock car racing driver.

== Racing career ==
Churchill competed in three races during the inaugural NASCAR SuperTruck Series season in 1995. He achieved a top-ten finish at Louisville Motor Speedway. He returned in 1996 for one race but failed to qualify. Churchill also competed in 47 ARCA Racing Series events between 1988 and 2000, achieving one win and 19 top-ten finishes. He also competed in three Hooters Pro Cup Series events in 1998.

== Personal life ==
Churchill is the son of Jerry Churchill, who also competed in NASCAR, his father was also the first non-American driver to compete in NASCAR SuperTruck Series and Randy was the second. Together, they are one of only seven father-son duo to win races in ARCA Racing Series.

== Motorsports career results ==
=== NASCAR ===
(key) (Bold – Pole position awarded by qualifying time. Italics – Pole position earned by points standings or practice time. * – Most laps led.)

==== Craftsman Truck Series ====
NASCAR Craftsman Truck Series results
Year	Team	No.	Make	1	2	3	4	5	6	7	8	9	10	11	12	13	14	15	16	17	18	19	20	21	22	23	24	NCTC	Pts	Ref
1995	Churchill Motorsports	88	Ford	PHO	TUS	SGS	MMR	POR	EVG	I70; 15	LVL; 10																	47th	370	
1995	Churchill Motorsports	55	Ford									BRI; 15	MLW	CNS	HPT	IRP	FLM	RCH	MAR	NWS	SON	MMR	PHO					47th	370	
1996	Churchill Motorsports	55	Ford	HOM; DNQ	PHO	POR	EVG	TUS	CNS	HPT	BRI	NZH	MLW	LVL	I70	IRP	FLM	GLN	NSV	RCH	NHA	MAR	NWS	SON	MMR	PHO	LVS	132nd	46	
