= Kenji Momota =

Japanese racing driver

- Born: August 4, 1962 (age 64); Tokyo, Japan

NASCAR FedEx Freight Truck Series career
- 1 race run over 1 year
- Best finish: 82nd (1995)
- First race: 1995 GM Goodwrench/Delco Battery 200 (Phoenix)
| Wins | Top tens | Poles |
|---|---|---|
| 0 | 0 | 0 |

Kenji Momota (桃田 健史, Momota Kenji; born August 4, 1962) is a Japanese racing announcer, racing commentator and former driver. He has raced in the All Japan Touring Car Championship, American Racing Series, IndyCar and NASCAR.

== Racing career ==
Momota drove in the All Japan Touring Car Championship in the mid to late 1980s. In 1990, he competed in the first two American Racing Series races of the season for TEAMKAR International, finishing 17th and 20th. He attempted to qualify for the 1992 Indianapolis 500 in a car fielded by TEAMKAR but was bumped from the field on the final day of qualifying by Jimmy Vasser. In 1995, he competed in a NASCAR SuperTruck Series race at Phoenix International Raceway driving for Randy MacDonald, becoming the first Japanese NASCAR driver. He crashed 25 laps in and was credited with 37th place.

== Post-racing career ==
Since ending his career, Momota has worked as a racing journalist and announcer. From 2004 to the network's final season of coverage in 2019, he was a color commentator for Nippon TV G+'s NASCAR broadcast.

== Motorsports career results ==
=== NASCAR ===
(key) (Bold – Pole position awarded by qualifying time. Italics – Pole position earned by points standings or practice time. * – Most laps led.)

==== SuperTruck Series ====
NASCAR SuperTruck Series results
| Year | Team | No. | Make | 1 | 2 | 3 | 4 | 5 | 6 | 7 | 8 | 9 | 10 | 11 | 12 | 13 | 14 | 15 | 16 | 17 | 18 | 19 | 20 | NCTC | Pts | Ref |
|---|---|---|---|---|---|---|---|---|---|---|---|---|---|---|---|---|---|---|---|---|---|---|---|---|---|---|
| 1995 | MacDonald Motorsports | 71 | Chevy | PHO | TUS | SGS | MMR | POR | EVG | I70 | LVL | BRI | MLW | CNS | HPT | IRP | FLM | RCH | MAR | NWS; DNQ | SON | MMR | PHO; 37 | 82nd | 104 | |
