= Jimmy Dick (racing driver) =

American stock car racing driver

- Born: James A. Dick IV; October 22, 1957 (age 69); El Paso, Texas, U.S.

NASCAR FedEx Freight Truck Series career
- 3 races run over 1 year
- 1995 position: 51st
- Best finish: 51st (1995)
- First race: 1995 Total Petroleum 200 (Colorado)
- Last race: 1995 Spears Manufacturing 200 (Mesa Marin)
Wins	Top tens	Poles
0	0	0
- Statistics up to date as of August 11, 2020.

James A. Dick IV (born October 22, 1957) is an American professional racing driver and businessman. He is the proprietor of the El Paso, Texas-based Viva Autosport chain of car dealerships, has driven in the NASCAR SuperTruck Series, and formerly owned the NASCAR Nationwide Series team Viva Motorsports.

== Business career ==
Coming from a family of businessmen, Dick bought his first car dealership in El Paso, Texas in 1985. By 2007, Dick owned six new car dealerships and three used car dealerships, and rebranded all of the dealerships under a new Viva Autosport name. By 2016, that number had grown to 13 and the Viva chain of dealerships had expanded to New Mexico.

Dick later owned and sponsored a NASCAR Nationwide Series team, Viva Motorsports, which ran entries for his son, Jamie Dick.

== Racing career ==
After participating in a 1988 charity race at El Paso Speedway Park, Dick decided to become a sprint car racer, only to decide against it some time later due to safety risks and a lack of advancement opportunities. He ran a limited schedule in the NASCAR Winston West Series in 1994, hoping to use that experience as a springboard to running some NASCAR Winston Cup Series races in 1995 or 1996. In 1995, Dick ran three NASCAR SuperTruck Series races, scoring a best finish of 17th at Colorado National Speedway.

== Personal life ==
Dick was previously married, but divorced his wife.

== Motorsports career results ==
=== NASCAR ===
(key) (Bold – Pole position awarded by qualifying time. Italics – Pole position earned by points standings or practice time. * – Most laps led.)

==== SuperTruck Series ====
NASCAR SuperTruck Series results
Year	Team	No.	Make	1	2	3	4	5	6	7	8	9	10	11	12	13	14	15	16	17	18	19	20	NSTSC	Pts	Ref
1995	Jimmy Dick Racing	79	Chevy	PHO	TUS	SGS	MMR	POR	EVG	I70	LVL	BRI	MLW	CNS; 17	HPT	IRP	FLM; 18	RCH	MAR	NWS	SON	MMR; 22	PHO	51st	318	

==== Winston West Series ====
NASCAR Winston West Series results
Year	Team	No.	Make	1	2	3	4	5	6	7	8	9	10	11	12	13	14	NWWSC	Pts	Ref
1993	Diaz Racing	77	Chevy	TWS	MMR	SGS	SON	TUS	SHA	EVG	POR	CBS	SSS	CAJ; 8	TCR	MMR; 14	PHO	32nd	263	
1994	Diaz Racing	77	Chevy	MMR; 17	TUS; 5	SON	SGS; 16	YAK	MMR; 17	POR	IND	CAJ; 16	TCR	LVS	MMR	PHO	TUS	25th	609	
