= Joe Bessey =

American racing driver (born 1961)

- Born: June 25, 1961 (age 65); Scarborough, Maine, U.S.
- Achievements: 2003, 2004 Busch North Series Champion (crew chief)
- Awards: 1988 Busch North Series Rookie of the Year

NASCAR Cup Series career
- 1 race run over 1 year
- Best finish: 64th (2000)
- First race: 2000 Dura Lube 300 (Loudon)
Wins	Top tens	Poles
0	0	0

NASCAR O'Reilly Auto Parts Series career
- 163 races run over 15 years
- Best finish: 17th (1993)
- First race: 1988 Pennsylvania 300 (Nazareth)
- Last race: 2002 Stacker 2 200 (Nazareth)
- First win: 1997 MBNA 200 (Dover)
Wins	Top tens	Poles
1	20	2

NASCAR FedEx Freight Truck Series career
- 4 races run over 3 years
- Best finish: 62nd (1995)
- First race: 1995 Skoal Bandit Copper World Classic (Phoenix)
- Last race: 1997 GM Goodwrench/Delco 300 (Phoenix)
Wins	Top tens	Poles
0	2	0

ARCA Menards Series career
- 3 races run over 3 years
- Best finish: N/A
- First race: 1994 Jiffy Lube 500k (Atlanta)
- Last race: 1996 General Tire Hoosier 500k (Atlanta)
- First win: 1996 General Tire Hoosier 500k (Atlanta)
Wins	Top tens	Poles
1	3	0

ARCA Menards Series East career
- 131 races run over 11 years
- Best finish: 2nd (1992)
- First race: 1987 Hancock Lumber 100 (Oxford)
- Last race: 1997 United States Cellular 100 (Loudon)
- First win: 1989 Pontiac Motorsports Twin 100s (Riverside Park)
- Last win: 1995 NYNEX Yellow Pages NASCAR Doubleheader (Loudon)
Wins	Top tens	Poles
8	43	0
- Statistics up to date as of June 9, 2026.

Joseph W. Bessey (born June 25, 1961) is an American former NASCAR owner/driver. He won one career Busch Series race before heading back to the Busch Grand National North Series in 2001, where he continues to field teams. In his driving career in that series in the mid-1990s, he won 21 races and two championships. Bessey is also a businessman, having started his own trucking companies in his 20s.

== Racing career ==
=== Busch Series ===
Bessey made his Busch Series debut in 1988 at the Pennsylvania 300 at Nazareth Speedway in the No. 9 Pontiac. Despite an eighth place starting spot, he finished last after a crash on the opening lap. He made five other races in 1988, his best finish being nineteenth at Dover. He also finished his remaining five races.

Bessey made six more starts in 1989 and finished in the top-twenty in four of the six races, with fourteenth at Dover, a seventeenth at Nazareth and had a pair of twentieths. He also had a top-ten start at Richmond. However, he did not finish his other two starts, but finished 45th in points. The next season, he only started four races, finishing just one of them.

Bessey made eight starts in 1991. Driving his No. 9 Pontiacs and the No. 64 Pontiacs, Bessey finished six of his eight starts, and managed his career best finish with a fourteenth place at Daytona International Speedway. He also had three top-ten starts, the best being at Nazareth.

Bessey made nine starts in 1992. Bessey garnered an eleventh place run at Rockingham and then his first top-ten at Richmond. He also closed the year with three straight top-21 finishes. He was 42nd in the points, his highest showing to that date.

Bessey planned to run the full season in 1993. He made all but three races en route to a 17th-place points finish. Bessey had a best finish of third at Rockingham and added on a fourth at Rougement. He also had an eighth and a pair of tenths. Bessey also earned his best career start of fourth at the inaugural race at Talladega.

With his success in 1993, Bessey focused more on the Busch North Series, but did manage to make eleven Busch Starts in 1994, three of which resulted in top-tens. Driving his No. 97 Bellsouth Chevy, Bessey finished sixth at Atlanta and tenth at Dover and Charlotte. He also had three top-ten starts.

Bessey returned for 1995. He had two top-tens: a ninth at Rockingham and a tenth at Nazareth. (driving for Jimmy Spencer) However, Bessey continued to struggle in finishing races, only running at the end of half of his starts.

In 1996, he drove the No. 9 Delco Remy America Chevy in twelve races. For the first time since 1992, Bessey did not finish in the top-ten in any race, but did have five top-nineteen finishes. At Rockingham, Bessey made his debut for Power Team; a sponsorship deal resulted in a two-year deal to go Busch Racing full-time.

Bessey returned full-time 1997, driving the No. 6 Power Team Chevy. Bessey picked up his first win at the MBNA 200, despite being ill that day. He also had four other top-ten finishes, the best being a sixth at South Boston. He also earned his first career pole in the inaugural event at Gateway, and finished eighteenth in points, the best run of his career.

Bessey did not win a race in 1998, but had four top-tens, the best being a fifth at Nazareth. He had a solid weekend at New Hampshire, where he won the pole and led 107 laps. However, in a late race fight for the lead with Buckshot Jones, Bessey crashed while Jones won the race. Bessey had four top-ten finishes to finish eighteenth in standings.

With Bessey going full-time Cup racing in 1999, he only made a few starts that season. His best run was a seventeenth at Nazareth driving for Geoff Bodine and an eighteenth at Dover (back in his No. 6). He did not finish his other three starts.

Bessey and the No. 6 only returned for one race in 2000. He started 26th at New Hampshire, but crashed on the first lap and finished 43rd.

Bessey made three starts in 2001, with a seventeenth at Daytona, 43rd at Talladega and a 22nd at New Hampshire (where he started in the eighth position).

Bessey made his last two starts: a 25th at New Hampshire and an eighteenth at Nazareth. Afterward, Bessey moved back full-time to Busch North Series as an owner, where he continues to this day.

=== Winston Cup Series ===
Bessey moved his operation up to Winston Cup in 1999, fielding the No. 60 Power Team Chevy driven by Geoff Bodine. Bodine was eighth in the second race of the year at Rockingham. Bodine also earned a third-place finish late in the year at Martinsville Speedway. Also, Bodine was able to qualify in every race in 1999, earning the team a 27th place finish.

Bodine, however, was injured in the season opening Craftsman Truck Series race of 2000, and Bessey was sent scrambling for a driver. The team missed the Daytona 500, but Bessey's new driver, Ted Musgrave made the next five races. After a best finish of sixteenth, Musgrave left and Bessey moved onto Dick Trickle, who made three starts for Bessey, before Bodine returned to the team at Richmond. Bodine had a solid run of thirteenth in his return, but the team continued to struggle to qualify. Bodine only made ten of the next fourteen races. Even with a best finish of twelfth, Bessey released Bodine after a 41st at Richmond.

Bessey then made his Cup debut the next week at NHIS. He barely made it in with a 42nd place starting position at his home track. He finished 27th.

Bessey then used drivers Trickle and Rich Bickle to finish out the year. However, the team began to struggle to qualifying with Bessey's team only making a handful of the final eight races.

After a failed attempt to get Hermie Sadler to drive his car with The Rock sponsoring in 2001, Bessey closed down his Cup team, and ran selected Busch races after that.

=== Craftsman Truck Series ===
Bessey has also made four career starts in the Truck Series. His best run came in his debut at Phoenix in 1995, where he started fifth and finished fourth in the No. 30 Taylor Togs Dodge. His other start in 1995 resulted in a 38th at Phoenix.

At NHIS in 1996, Bessey's lone run resulted in a fourth place start. Once again, he ran a solid race at his home track and drove the No. 9 Chevy to a sixth place finish.

Bessey's sole race in 1997 came at Phoenix, driving for A. J. Foyt. There he started 19th, but struggled home to 35th place after his engine blew.

== Motorsports career results ==
=== NASCAR ===
(key) (Bold – Pole position awarded by qualifying time. Italics – Pole position earned by points standings or practice time. * – Most laps led.)

==== Winston Cup Series ====
NASCAR Winston Cup Series results
Year	Team	No.	Make	1	2	3	4	5	6	7	8	9	10	11	12	13	14	15	16	17	18	19	20	21	22	23	24	25	26	27	28	29	30	31	32	33	34	NWCC	Pts	Ref
1994	Gray Racing	62	Ford	DAY	CAR	RCH	ATL	DAR	BRI	NWS	MAR	TAL	SON	CLT	DOV	POC	MCH	DAY	NHA; DNQ	POC	TAL	IND	GLN	MCH	BRI	DAR	RCH	DOV	MAR	NWS	CLT	CAR	PHO	ATL				NA	-	
2000	Joe Bessey Motorsports	60	Chevy	DAY	CAR	LVS	ATL	DAR	BRI	TEX	MAR	TAL	CAL	RCH	CLT	DOV	MCH	POC	SON	DAY	NHA	POC	IND	GLN	MCH	BRI	DAR	RCH	NHA; 27	DOV; DNQ	MAR	CLT	TAL	CAR	PHO	HOM	ATL	64th	82	

==== Busch Series ====
NASCAR Busch Series results
Year	Team	No.	Make	1	2	3	4	5	6	7	8	9	10	11	12	13	14	15	16	17	18	19	20	21	22	23	24	25	26	27	28	29	30	31	32	33	34	NBSC	Pts	Ref
1988	Joe Bessey Motorsports	9	Pontiac	DAY	HCY	CAR	MAR	DAR	BRI	LNG	NZH; 38	SBO	NSV	CLT	DOV; 19	ROU	LAN	LVL	MYB	OXF; 21	SBO	HCY	LNG	IRP; 27	ROU	BRI	DAR	RCH; 21	DOV; 24	MAR	CLT	CAR	MAR					48th	428	
1989	Joe Bessey Motorsports	09	Pontiac	DAY	CAR; 20	MAR	HCY	DAR	BRI																													45th	573	
1989	Joe Bessey Motorsports	19	Pontiac							NZH; 17	SBO	LAN	NSV	CLT									IRP; 34	ROU	BRI	DAR		DOV; 14	MAR	CLT	CAR	MAR						45th	573	
1989	Joe Bessey Motorsports	9	Pontiac												DOV; 20	ROU	LVL	VOL	MYB	SBO	HCY	DUB					RCH; 30											45th	573	
1990	Joe Bessey Motorsports	9	Pontiac	DAY	RCH; 22	CAR	MAR	HCY	DAR	BRI	LAN	SBO	NZH	HCY	CLT	DOV	ROU	VOL	MYB	OXF; 35	NHA	SBO	DUB	IRP	ROU	BRI	DAR	RCH	DOV; 39	MAR	CLT							66th	256	
1990	Joe Bessey Motorsports	19	Pontiac																													NHA; 36	CAR	MAR				66th	256	
1991	Joe Bessey Motorsports	9	Olds	DAY; 14	RCH	CAR; 31	MAR	VOL	HCY	DAR	BRI	LAN	SBO	NZH; 26	CLT	DOV	ROU	HCY	MYB	GLN		NHA; 36	SBO	DUB	IRP													44th	623	
1991	Joe Bessey Motorsports	91	Olds																		OXF; 34																	44th	623	
1991	Shoemaker Racing	64	Pontiac																							ROU; 30	BRI	DAR	RCH	DOV; 32	CLT							44th	623	
1991	Shoemaker Racing	64	Olds																													NHA; 24	CAR	MAR				44th	623	
1992	Joe Bessey Motorsports	9	Pontiac	DAY; 35																	NHA; 21	TAL	IRP	ROU	MCH	NHA; 17	BRI	DAR	RCH	DOV	CLT	MAR						42nd	922	
1992		7	Pontiac		CAR; 11																																	42nd	922	
1992	Joe Bessey Motorsports	91	Pontiac			RCH; 10																																42nd	922	
1992	Joe Bessey Motorsports	9	Olds				ATL; 23	MAR	DAR	BRI	HCY	LAN	DUB																									42nd	922	
1992	Shoemaker Racing	64	Pontiac											NZH; 24	CLT	DOV; 26	ROU	MYB	GLN	VOL																		42nd	922	
1992	Joe Bessey Motorsports	93	Pontiac																														CAR; 15	HCY				42nd	922	
1993	Joe Bessey Motorsports	97	Olds	DAY; 18		RCH; DNQ			HCY; 12	ROU; 4	MAR; 13			DOV; 22	MYB; 15																							17th	2834	
1993	Joe Bessey Motorsports	97	Pontiac		CAR; 21		DAR; 23	BRI; 30				NZH; 29	CLT			GLN; 24	MLW; 18		IRP; 16			BRI; 12	DAR; 14	RCH; 8	DOV; 10	ROU; 10		MAR; 20	CAR; 3	HCY; DNQ								17th	2834	
1993	Joe Bessey Motorsports	97	Chevy															TAL; 20		MCH; 16	NHA; 23						CLT; 16				ATL; 25							17th	2834	
1994	Joe Bessey Motorsports	97	Chevy	DAY; 16	CAR; 28		ATL; 6	MAR	DAR; 29	HCY	BRI; 31	ROU	NHA; 15	NZH	CLT; 10	DOV	MYB	GLN	MLW	SBO	TAL; DNQ	HCY	IRP	MCH	BRI	DAR	RCH	DOV; 10	CLT; 24	MAR	CAR; 11							37th	1152	
1994	Joe Bessey Motorsports	97	Olds			RCH; 36																																37th	1152	
1995	Davison Motorsports	97	Chevy	DAY; 23	CAR; 9																																	44th	733	
1995	Davison Motorsports	97	Pontiac			RCH; 29	ATL	NSV; 37	DAR	BRI	HCY																											44th	733	
1995	Joe Bessey Motorsports	9	Pontiac									NHA; 25									IRP; 14	MCH	BRI; 24	DAR	RCH	DOV	CLT											44th	733	
1995	Moroso Racing	20	Ford										NZH; 10	CLT	DOV	MYB; 24	GLN	MLW	TAL	SBO																		44th	733	
1995	Joe Bessey Motorsports	9	Chevy																									CAR; 31	HOM									44th	733	
1996	Joe Bessey Motorsports	9	Chevy	DAY; 11	CAR; 28	RCH; 18	ATL; 43	NSV; 17	DAR; 27	BRI; 36	HCY; 19	NZH	CLT; 33	DOV	SBO	MYB	GLN	MLW	NHA; 13	TAL; 29	IRP; DNQ	MCH	BRI	DAR	RCH	DOV	CLT											44th	1023	
1996	Martin Racing	92	Chevy																									CAR; 26	HOM; DNQ									44th	1023	
1997	Joe Bessey Motorsports	6	Chevy	DAY; 29	CAR; 23	RCH; 22	ATL; 29	LVS; 37	DAR; 28	HCY; 22	TEX; 27	BRI; 36	NSV; 32	TAL; 28	NHA; 21	NZH; 6	CLT; 36	DOV; 20	SBO; 10	GLN; 26	MLW; 19	MYB; 27	**GTY**; 9	IRP; 19	MCH; 41	BRI; 17	DAR; 23	RCH; 42	DOV; 1	CLT; 18	CAL; 16	CAR; 22	HOM; 9					18th	2835	
1998	Joe Bessey Motorsports	6	Chevy	DAY; 40	CAR; 30	LVS; 12	NSV; 12	DAR; 36	BRI; 37	TEX; 43	HCY; 25	TAL; 21	**NHA**; 35*	NZH; 5	CLT; 19	DOV; 28	RCH; 17	PPR; 28	GLN; 28	MLW; 9	MYB; 7	CAL; 9	SBO; 19	IRP; 31	MCH; 34	BRI; 33	DAR; 27	RCH; 23	DOV; 16	CLT; 28	GTY; 35	CAR; 42	ATL; 16	HOM; 30				18th	2763	
1999	Joe Bessey Motorsports	6	Chevy	DAY; DNQ	CAR; 38	LVS	ATL	DAR	TEX	NSV	BRI	TAL; DNQ	CAL	NHA; DNQ	RCH			DOV; 33	SBO	GLN	MLW	MYB	PPR	GTY; 39	IRP	MCH	BRI	DAR	RCH	DOV; 18	CLT	CAR	MEM	PHO	HOM			71st	380	
1999	Shoemaker Racing	64	Chevy													NZH; 17	CLT																					71st	380	
2000	Joe Bessey Motorsports	6	Chevy	DAY	CAR	LVS	ATL	DAR	BRI	TEX	NSV	TAL	CAL	RCH	NHA; 43	CLT	DOV	SBO	MYB	GLN	MLW	NZH	PPR	GTY	IRP	MCH	BRI	DAR	RCH	DOV	CLT	CAR	MEM	PHO	HOM			120th	34	
2001	Joe Bessey Motorsports	6	Pontiac	DAY; 17	CAR	LVS	ATL	DAR	BRI	TEX	NSH	TAL; 43	CAL	RCH																								77th	243	
2001	Joe Bessey Motorsports	6	Chevy												NHA; 22	NZH	CLT	DOV	KEN	MLW	GLN	CHI	GTY	PPR	IRP	MCH	BRI	DAR	RCH	DOV	KAN	CLT	MEM	PHO	CAR	HOM		77th	243	
2002	Joe Bessey Motorsports	6	Chevy	DAY	CAR	LVS	DAR	BRI	TEX	NSH	TAL	CAL	RCH	NHA; 25	NZH; 18	CLT	DOV	NSH	KEN	MLW	DAY	CHI	GTY	PPR	IRP	MCH	BRI	DAR	RCH	DOV	KAN	CLT	MEM	ATL	CAR	PHO	HOM	85th	197	

==== Craftsman Truck Series ====
NASCAR Craftsman Truck Series results
Year	Team	No.	Make	1	2	3	4	5	6	7	8	9	10	11	12	13	14	15	16	17	18	19	20	21	22	23	24	25	26	NCTC	Pts	Ref
1995	Grandaddy Racing	30	Dodge	PHO; 4	TUS	SGS	MMR	POR	EVG	I70	LVL	BRI	MLW	CNS	HPT	IRP	FLM	RCH	MAR	NWS	SON	MMR								62nd	209	
1995	Joe Bessey Motorsports	9	Chevy																				PHO; 38							62nd	209	
1996	Joe Bessey Motorsports	9	Chevy	HOM	PHO	POR	EVG	TUS	CNS	HPT	BRI	NZH	MLW	LVL	I70	IRP	FLM	GLN	NSV	RCH	NHA; 6	MAR	NWS	SON	MMR	PHO	LVS			87th	150	
1997	A. J. Foyt Enterprises	50	Ford	WDW	TUS	HOM	PHO	POR	EVG	I70	NHA	TEX	BRI	NZH	MLW	LVL	CNS	HPT	IRP	FLM	NSV	GLN	RCH	MAR	SON	MMR	CAL	PHO; 35	LVS	132nd	58	

=== ARCA Bondo/Mar-Hyde Series ===
(key) (Bold – Pole position awarded by qualifying time. Italics – Pole position earned by points standings or practice time. * – Most laps led.)

ARCA Bondo/Mar-Hyde Series results
Year	Team	No.	Make	1	2	3	4	5	6	7	8	9	10	11	12	13	14	15	16	17	18	19	20	21	22	23	24	25	ABSC	Pts	Ref
1994	Joe Bessey Motorsports	7	Chevy	DAY	TAL	FIF	LVL	KIL	TOL	FRS	MCH	DMS	POC	POC	KIL	FRS	INF	I70	ISF	DSF	TOL	SLM	WIN	ATL; 3					111th	475	
1995	Joe Bessey Motorsports	9	Chevy	DAY	ATL	TAL	FIF	KIL	FRS	MCH	I80	MCS	FRS	POC	POC	KIL	FRS	SBS	LVL	ISF	DSF	SLM	WIN	ATL; 2					106th	-	
1996	Joe Bessey Motorsports	7	Chevy	DAY	ATL	SLM	TAL	FIF	LVL	CLT	CLT	KIL	FRS	POC	MCH	FRS	TOL	POC	MCH	INF	SBS	ISF	DSF	KIL	SLM	WIN	CLT	ATL; 1	126th	-	
