= John Kinder (racing driver) =

American racing driver (born 1974)

- Born: September 28, 1974 (age 52); Santa Ana, California, U.S.

NASCAR FedEx Freight Truck Series career
- 12 races run over 1 year
- Best finish: 23rd (1995)
- First race: 1995 Scott Irvin Chevrolet/Craftsman 200 (Saugus)
- Last race: 1995 Spears Manufacturing 200 (Mesa Marin)
Wins	Top tens	Poles
0	0	0

USAR Hooters Pro Cup Series
- Years active: 1999–2003
- Starts: 59
- Wins: 0
- Poles: 0
- Best finish: 12th in 2001

Previous series
- 1998–1999 1995–1997 1995: ARCA Bondo/Mar-Hyde Series; NASCAR Winston West Series; NASCAR SuperTruck Series

John Hartman Kinder (born September 28, 1974 in Santa Ana, California) is a Japanese American former professional stock car racing driver. He is a former competitor in the NASCAR SuperTruck Series by Craftsman and the Winston West Series, and in the USAR Hooters Pro Cup Series.

== Career ==
Son of racer Jim Kinder, John Kinder began his racing career in 1991 at Mesa Marin Raceway in Bakersfield, California. Nicknamed "The Kid", Kinder competed in the NASCAR Winston West Series between 1995 and 1997, posting a best finish of second at Mesa Marin in 1996. He also competed in twelve events in the 1995 NASCAR SuperTruck Series presented by Craftsman, finishing 23rd in the series standings with a best finish of thirteenth, recorded at Evergreen Speedway and Flemington Speedway.

In 1997, Kinder was selected to participate in the Suzuka Thunder Special, a NASCAR exhibition race held at Suzuka Circuit in Japan; he was the only Japanese-American driver to compete in the event, and he finished seventeenth in the race.

In 1998, Kinder moved to the ARCA Racing Series, competing in six races over two years with a best finish of eighth at Atlanta Motor Speedway, then to the Hooters Pro Cup Series from 1999 to 2003 for PowerBase Motorsports, competing in 59 races with a best finish of third at Concord Speedway. He has not competed in major-league stock car racing since 2003.

== Motorsports career results ==
=== NASCAR ===
(key) (Bold – Pole position awarded by qualifying time. Italics – Pole position earned by points standings or practice time. * – Most laps led.)

==== SuperTruck Series ====
NASCAR SuperTruck Series results
Year	Team	No.	Make	1	2	3	4	5	6	7	8	9	10	11	12	13	14	15	16	17	18	19	20	NSTSC	Pts	Ref
1995	Stroppe Motorsports	14	Ford	PHO	TUS	SGS; 23	MMR; 15	POR; 22	EVG; 13	I70; 19	LVL; 17	BRI	MLW; 26	CNS; 28	HPT	IRP; 34	FLM; 13	RCH; 38	MAR	NWS	SON	MMR; 31	PHO	23rd	1183	
