= Jerry Churchill =

Canadian racing driver

- Born: September 18, 1938; Windsor, Ontario, Canada
- Died: June 7, 2008 (aged 69); Windsor, Ontario, Canada

NASCAR Cup Series career
- 7 races run over 2 years
- Best finish: 68th (1971)
- First race: 1971 Albany-Saratoga 250 (Malta)
- Last race: 1984 Budweiser 500 (Dover)
Wins	Top tens	Poles
0	0	0

NASCAR FedEx Freight Truck Series career
- 7 races run over 1 year
- Best finish: 33rd (1995)
- First race: 1995 Skoal Bandit Copper World Classic (Phoenix)
- Last race: 1995 Pizza Plus 150 (Bristol)
Wins	Top tens	Poles
0	0	0

Jerry Churchill (September 18, 1938 – June 7, 2008) was a Canadian professional stock car racing driver.

== Racing career ==
Churchill made seven NASCAR Winston Cup Series and seven NASCAR SuperTruck Series starts in his career. He was the first non-American driver to compete in NASCAR SuperTruck Series. He also competed in ARCA Racing Series with 130 starts and had one win at Kil-Kare Raceway. Churchill competed in the first NASCAR race held outside North America, the 1988 Goodyear NASCAR 500 at Australia's Calder Park Thunderdome, finishing thirteenth.

== Personal life ==
Churchill was the father of Randy Churchill, who also competed in NASCAR. Together, they are one of only seven father-son duo to win races in ARCA Racing Series.

== Motorsports career results ==
=== NASCAR ===
(key) (Bold – Pole position awarded by qualifying time. Italics – Pole position earned by points standings or practice time. * – Most laps led.)

==== Grand National Series ====
NASCAR Grand National Series results
Year	Team	No.	Make	1	2	3	4	5	6	7	8	9	10	11	12	13	14	15	16	17	18	19	20	21	22	23	24	25	26	27	28	29	30	31	32	33	34	35	36	37	38	39	40	41	42	43	44	45	46	47	48	NGNC	Pts	Ref
1971	Churchill Motorsports	73	Ford	RSD	DAY	DAY	DAY	ONT	RCH	CAR	HCY	BRI	ATL	CLB	GPS	SMR	NWS	MAR	DAR	SBO	TAL	ASH	KPT	CLT	DOV	MCH	RSD	HOU	GPS	DAY	BRI	AST; 15	ISP; 17	TRN; 40	NSV; 14	ATL	BGS; 27	ONA; 35	MCH	TAL; DNQ	CLB	HCY	DAR	MAR; DNQ	CLT	DOV	CAR	MGR	RCH	NWS	TWS	68th	121	

==== Winston Cup Series ====
NASCAR Winston Cup Series results
Year	Team	No.	Make	1	2	3	4	5	6	7	8	9	10	11	12	13	14	15	16	17	18	19	20	21	22	23	24	25	26	27	28	29	30	NWCC	Pts	Ref
1984	Churchill Motorsports	25	Chevy	DAY; DNQ	RCH	CAR	ATL	BRI	NWS	DAR	MAR	TAL	NSV	DOV; 34	CLT	RSD	POC	MCH; DNQ	DAY	NSV	POC	TAL	MCH	BRI	DAR	RCH	DOV	MAR	CLT	NWS	CAR	ATL	RSD	85th	61	

===== Daytona 500 =====
Year	Team	Manufacturer	Start	Finish
1984	Churchill Motorsports	Chevrolet	DNQ	

==== SuperTruck Series ====
NASCAR SuperTruck Series results
Year	Team	No.	Make	1	2	3	4	5	6	7	8	9	10	11	12	13	14	15	16	17	18	19	20	NSTSC	Pts	Ref
1995	Churchill Motorsports	88	Ford	PHO; 23	TUS; 12	SGS; 15	MMR; 23	POR; 24	EVG; 26	I70	LVL	BRI; 19	MLW	CNS	HPT	IRP	FLM	RCH	MAR	NWS	SON	MMR	PHO	33rd	715	

=== ARCA Re/Max Series ===
(key) (Bold – Pole position awarded by qualifying time. Italics – Pole position earned by points standings or practice time. * – Most laps led.)

ARCA Re/Max Series results
Year	Team	No.	Make	1	2	3	4	5	6	7	8	9	10	11	12	13	14	15	16	17	18	19	20	21	22	23	24	25	ARMC	Pts	Ref
1981	Churchill Motorsports	25	Chevy	DAY	DSP	FRS	FRS	BFS	TAL	FRS; 7	COR; 14																		NA	0	
1982	Churchill Motorsports	25	Chevy	NSV; 13																									7th	870	
1982	Churchill Motorsports	25	Olds		DAY; 6	TAL; 7	**FRS**; 15	**CMS**; 9	WIN; 4			TAL; 25																	7th	870	
1982	Churchill Motorsports	25	Buick							NSV; 21	TAT; 3		FRS; 13	BFS; 6		SND; 14													7th	870	
1982	Churchill Motorsports	5	Buick												MIL; 31														7th	870	
1983	Churchill Motorsports	25	Buick	DAY	**NSV**; 7		LPR; 13	LPR; 7	ISF; 5	IRP	SSP; 11	FRS; 6	BFS; 5	WIN; 5	LPR; 7		TAL; 31	MCS; 7	FRS; 8	MIL; 23	DSF; 10	ZAN; 18	SND; 17						8th	1565	
1983	Churchill Motorsports	25	Olds			TAL; 15																							8th	1565	
1983	Churchill Motorsports	25	Chevy													POC; 20													8th	1565	
1984	Churchill Motorsports	25	Chevy	DAY; 7	ATL; 16	TAL; 29	CSP	SMS	FRS; 17	MCS; 15	LCS; 4	IRP; 8	TAL	FRS; 4	ISF; 13	DSF; 34	TOL; 6	MGR; 14											9th	1275	
1985	Churchill Motorsports	25	Chevy	ATL; 20	DAY	ATL	TAL	ATL	SSP	IRP																			NA	0	
1985	Churchill Motorsports	25	Olds								CSP; 14	FRS; 15	IRP	OEF	ISF	DSF	TOL												NA	0	
1987	Churchill Motorsports	11	Chevy	DAY; 4		TAL; 18						FRS; 7		TAL; 24						ATL; 13									7th	2680	
1987	Churchill Motorsports	11	Olds		ATL; 21		DEL; 10	ACS; 23	TOL; 4	ROC; 13	POC; 11		KIL; 8		FRS; 19	ISF; 41	INF; 35	DSF; 22	SLM; 8										7th	2680	
1988	Churchill Motorsports	11	Chevy	DAY; 30	ATL; 9	TAL; 3	FRS; 11	PCS; 5	ROC; 8	POC; 20	WIN; 9	KIL; 10	ACS; 7	SLM; 5	POC; 15	TAL; 14	DEL; 12	FRS; 6	ISF; 12	DSF; 10	SLM; 9	ATL; 21							5th	3535	
1989	Churchill Motorsports	11	Chevy	DAY; 10		KIL; 3		FRS; 24		KIL; 20	HAG; 13			DEL; 6	**FRS**; 3	ISF; 5	TOL; 6	DSF; 23	SLM; 8										3rd	3320	
1989	Churchill Motorsports	11	Olds		ATL; 3																								3rd	3320	
1989	Churchill Motorsports	11	Chrysler				TAL; 28		POC; 6			POC; 30	TAL; 14							ATL; 15									3rd	3320	
1990	Churchill Motorsports	11	Chrysler	DAY; 8	ATL; 17	**KIL**; 1*	TAL; 11	FRS; 18	POC; 21	KIL	TOL	HAG; 14	POC	TAL	MCH; 34	ISF	TOL	DSF	WIN	DEL; 23	ATL								17th	1590	
1991	Bill Evans Racing	66	Chevy	DAY	ATL	KIL	TAL	TOL	FRS; 4	POC	MCH	KIL; 23	FRS	DEL; 10	POC	TAL	HPT; 5	MCH	ISF	TOL; 14	DSF; 32	TWS	ATL						22nd	1020	
1992	Churchill Motorsports	11	Chevy	DAY	FIF; 4	TWS	TAL	TOL	KIL; 8	POC	MCH	FRS; 11	KIL; 3	NSH; 14	DEL; 6	POC	HPT; 23	FRS; 11	ISF	TOL	DSF	TWS	SLM	ATL					18th	1585	
1993	Churchill Motorsports	11	Chevy	DAY	FIF	TWS	TAL	KIL	CMS	FRS	TOL	POC	MCH	FRS	POC	KIL	ISF	DSF	TOL; 14	SLM; 5	WIN	ATL							NA	0	
1994	Gardiner Motorsports	62	Chevy	DAY	TAL	FIF	LVL; 29	KIL	TOL	FRS	MCH																		NA	0	
1994	Gardiner Motorsports	62	Ford									DMS; 8	POC	POC	KIL; 9														NA	0	
1994	Churchill Motorsports	11	Ford													FRS; 14	INF	I70	ISF	DSF	TOL	SLM	WIN	ATL					NA	0	
2001	Churchill Motorsports	01	Chevy	DAY	NSH	WIN	SLM	GTY	KEN	CLT	KAN	MCH	POC	MEM	GLN; 9	KEN	MCH	POC	NSH	ISF	CHI	DSF	SLM	TOL	BLN	CLT	TAL	ATL	122nd	185	
