= 1995 NASCAR SuperTruck Series =

American motorsport season

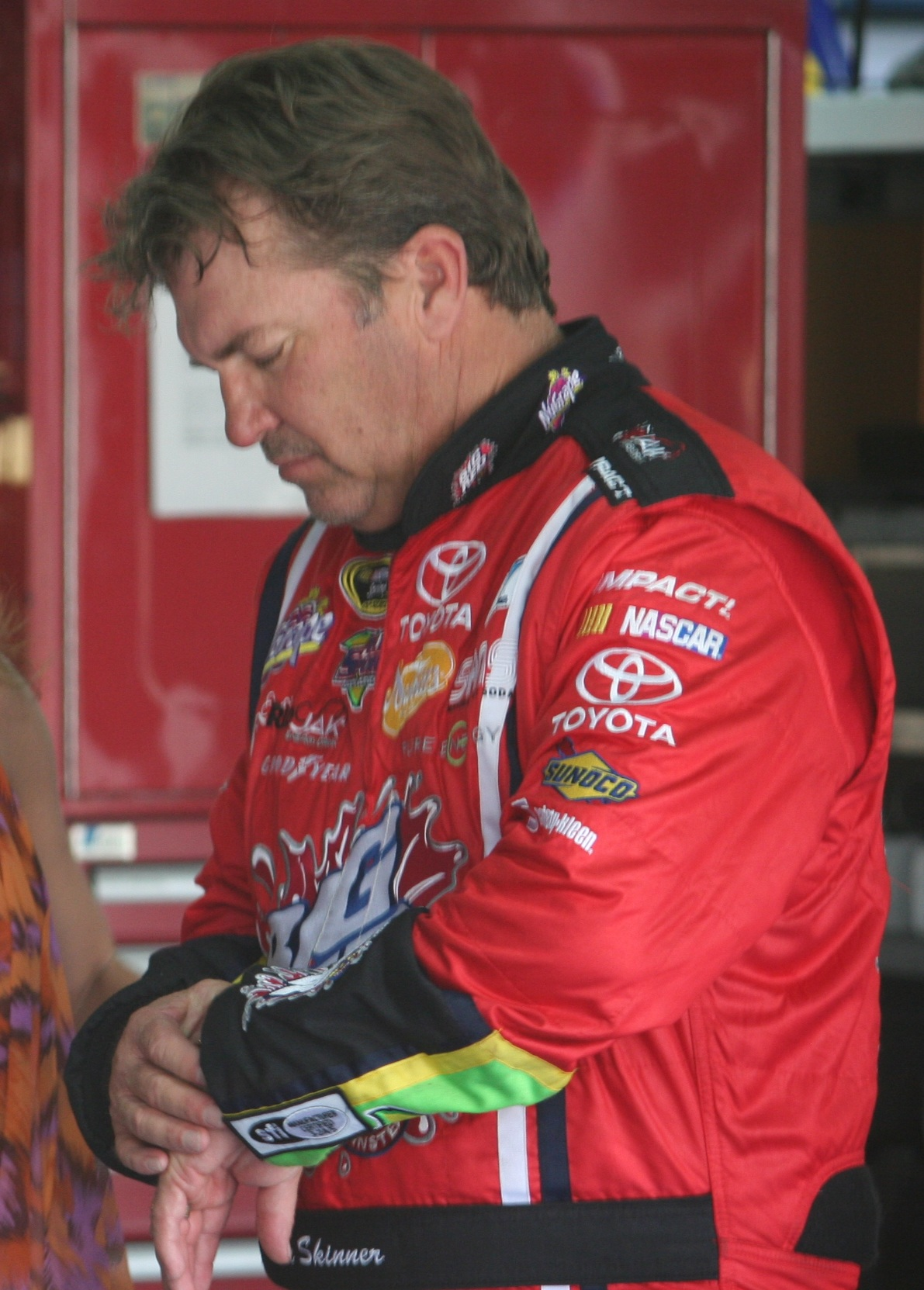
Mike Skinner (seen in 2011), the inaugural Truck Series champion

The 1995 NASCAR SuperTruck Series presented by Craftsman was the inaugural season of the NASCAR SuperTruck Series. The season began on February 5, 1995, and ended on October 28. Mike Skinner of Richard Childress Racing won the championship.

Prior to and after the season, NASCAR conducted seven exhibition races.

== Teams and drivers ==
Team	Manufacturer	No.	Race Driver	Crew Chief	Rounds
AAG Racing	Chevrolet	65	Frank Kimmel		1
AAG Racing	Chevrolet	65	Kirk Shelmerdine		1
AAG Racing	Chevrolet	65	Kenny Allen		11
A. J. Foyt Enterprises	Ford	41	A. J. Foyt		1
Akins-Sutton Motorsports	Ford	38	Sammy Swindell	Roland Wlodyka	Full
Archer Racing	Ford	03	Tommy Archer		3
Bobby Allison Motorsports	Ford	32	Derrike Cope		1
Borneman Motorsports	Chevrolet	8	John Borneman		1
Brevak Racing	Ford	4	Bob Brevak		5
Brevak Racing	Ford	34	Bob Brevak		6
Brevak Racing	Ford	34	Ray Daniels		6
Brevak Racing	Ford	42	Bob Brevak		1
Bunce Engineering	Chevrolet	63	Ron Esau		2
Collins Motorsports	Chevrolet	74	Gary Collins		4
Cone Racing	Chevrolet	22	Todd Massey		3
Combs Racing	Chevrolet	05	Rodney Combs Jr.		3
Chesrown Racing	Chevrolet	6	Rick Carelli	Joe Garone	Full
Chesrown Racing	Chevrolet	62	Mike Chase		1
Churchill Motorsports	Ford	55	Randy Churchill		1
Churchill Motorsports	Ford	88	Jerry Churchill		7
Churchill Motorsports	Ford	88	Randy Churchill		2
Churchill Motorsports	Ford	88	Freddie Query		1
Clark Racing	Chevrolet	23	T. J. Clark		13
Dale Earnhardt, Inc.	Chevrolet	16	Ron Hornaday Jr.	Doug Richert	Full
Dale Earnhardt, Inc.	Chevrolet	76	Dennis Dyer		1
Dale Earnhardt, Inc.	Chevrolet	76	David Green		1
Darrell Waltrip Motorsports	Chevrolet	17	Darrell Waltrip		3
Decuir Racing	Chevrolet	10	Troy Beebe		1
Decuir Racing	Chevrolet	10	Stan Fox		2
Decuir Racing	Chevrolet	10	Dennis Wooldridge		3
Decuir Racing	Chevrolet	10	Steve Darne		1
Decuir Racing	Chevrolet	10	Garrett Evans		2
Dokken Racing	Chevrolet	64	Michael Dokken		9
Doran Racing	Chevrolet	77	Gary St. Amant		2
Jimmy Dick Racing	Chevrolet	79	Jimmy Dick		3
Earl Barban Racing	Ford	90	Kenny Wallace		3
Enerjetix Motorsports	Chevrolet	99	Pancho Carter		3
Enerjetix Motorsports	Chevrolet	99	Gary Herrin		1
Flores Racing	Chevrolet	57	Bob Walker		2
Genzman Racing	Ford	48	Andy Genzman		2
Geoff Bodine Racing	Ford	7	Geoff Bodine	Dave Rezendes	10
Geoff Bodine Racing	Ford	7	Dave Rezendes		10
Geoff Bodine Racing	Ford	07	Dave Rezendes		1
Geoff Bodine Racing	Ford	07	Barry Bodine		1
Gigliotti Racing	Chevrolet	82	Lou Gigliotti		1
Glanville Motorsports	Ford	81	Jerry Glanville		15
Grier Lackey Motorsports	Dodge	30	Joe Bessey		1
Grier Lackey Motorsports	Dodge	30	Mark Gibson		2
Grier Lackey Motorsports	Dodge	30	Jimmy Hensley		3
Grier Lackey Motorsports	Dodge	30	Dennis Setzer		5
Griffin Racing	Chevrolet	31	Jack Sprague		13
Hansen Racing	Ford	53	Scott Hansen		1
Hendrick Motorsports	Chevrolet	5	Terry Labonte		3
Hendrick Motorsports	Chevrolet	5	Roger Mears		1
Hendrick Motorsports	Chevrolet	24	Scott Lagasse	Dennis Conner	Full
Hendrick Motorsports	Chevrolet	25	Roger Mears		3
Hendrick Motorsports	Chevrolet	25	Rick Hendrick		1
Hendrick Motorsports	Chevrolet	25	Jack Sprague		7
Irvan-Simo Racing	Ford	4	Boris Said		1
Irvan-Simo Racing	Ford	28	Ernie Irvan		4
Irvan-Simo Racing	Ford	84	Joe Ruttman	Sammy Houston	Full
Irvan-Simo Racing	Ford	94	Mark Simo		1
Jacks Racing	Chevrolet	58	Wayne Jacks		5
Joe Bessey Racing	Chevrolet	9	Joe Bessey		1
Jones Racing	Chevrolet	09	Bob Jones		2
K-Automotive Motorsports	Dodge	29	Bob Keselowski	Ron Keselowski	16
Ken Schrader Racing	Chevrolet	52	Ken Schrader	Tim Kohuth	7
Ken Schrader Racing	Chevrolet	52	Ron Esau	Tim Kohuth	1
Ken Schrader Racing	Chevrolet	52	Darrell Waltrip	Tim Kohuth	1
Kevin Harvick, Inc.	Chevrolet	72	Kevin Harvick	Mike Harvick	2
L&M Racing	Chevrolet	83	Steve Portenga	Rob Dehoney	18
Liberty Racing	Ford	98	Butch Miller	Gary Showalter	Full
MacDonald Motorsports	Chevrolet	71	Kenji Momota		2
MB Motorsports	Ford	26	Tony Roper		3
MB Motorsports	Ford	26	Andy Brass		1
MB Motorsports	Ford	26	Mike Wallace		1
McEachern Motorsports	Chevrolet	54	Steve McEachern		5
NEMCO Motorsports	Chevrolet	87	John Nemechek		15
Nooner Racing	Ford	15	Tim Nooner		2
Petty Enterprises	Chevrolet	43	Rodney Combs	Bob Johnson	5
Redding Motorsports	Chevrolet	89	John Nemechek		1
Redding Motorsports	Chevrolet	89	Troy Beebe		4
Redding Motorsports	Chevrolet	89	Bugs Hairfield		1
Redding Motorsports	Chevrolet	89	Dennis Setzer		3
Richard Childress Racing	Chevrolet	3	Mike Skinner	Rich Burgess	Full
Richard Childress Racing	Chevrolet	31	Bill Cooper		1
Richard Childress Racing	Chevrolet	31	Dave Marcis		1
Roehrig Motorsports	Chevrolet	18	Johnny Benson		8
Roehrig Motorsports	Chevrolet	18	Davy Jones		1
Roehrig Motorsports	Chevrolet	18	Wally Dallenbach Jr.		1
Rosenblum Racing	Chevrolet	51	Kerry Teague		12
Roush Racing	Ford	61	Ted Musgrave		1
Roush Racing	Ford	61	Todd Bodine		5
RPM Racing	Ford	11	Mike Hurlbert		12
RPM Racing	Ford	11	Chad Little		3
Sadler Racing	Chevrolet	00	Hermie Sadler		2
Sellers Motorsports	Ford	78	Dirk Stephens		1
Serrano Racing	Chevrolet	40	Carlos Serrano		3
Spears Motorsports	Chevrolet	75	Bill Sedgwick	Dan Press	Full
Strait Racing	Ford	37	Bob Strait		18
Stroppe Motorsports	Ford	14	John Kinder		12
Tallas Racing	Chevrolet	70	G. T. Tallas		3
Ultra Motorsports	Ford	06	Butch Gilliland		5
Ultra Motorsports	Ford	08	Mike Bliss		7
Ultra Motorsports	Ford	08	John Borneman		1
Ultra Motorsports	Ford	2	Dave Ashley		1
Ultra Motorsports	Ford	2	Mike Bliss	Barry Dodson	12
Ultra Motorsports	Ford	12	Bob Strait		1
Ultra Motorsports	Ford	12	Dave Smith		1
Venable Racing	Ford	21	Tobey Butler		Full
Venturini Motorsports	Chevrolet	35	Bill Venturini		2
Vestar Motorsports	Chevrolet	0	Frank Davis		5
Vestar Motorsports	Chevrolet	1	P. J. Jones	Leon Ruther	13
Vestar Motorsports	Chevrolet	1	Mike Chase	Leon Ruther	7
Vestar Motorsports	Chevrolet	01	Gary Lloyd		2
Vestar Motorsports	Chevrolet	01	Ricky Johnson		1
Vestar Motorsports	Chevrolet	01	Andy Hillenburg		1
Walker Evans Racing	Dodge	20	Walker Evans		18
Walker Evans Racing	Dodge	26	Ron Esau		1
Walker Evans Racing	Dodge	28	Ron Esau		1
Winslow Racing	Chevrolet	68	Ernest Winslow	Ronnie Riddle	3

== Schedule ==
The 1995 SuperTruck Series presented by Craftsman schedule consisted of twenty races, at eighteen tracks in fifteen states. In addition, an exhibition race was run following the end of the season at the Homestead-Miami Speedway as a demonstration of the trucks' suitability for larger racetracks.

No.	Race title	Track	Date	Network
1	Skoal Bandit Copper World Classic	Phoenix International Raceway, Avondale	February 5	TNN
2	Racing Champions 200	Tucson Raceway Park, Tucson	April 8	ESPN
3	Scott Irvin Chevrolet/Craftsman 200	Saugus Speedway, Saugus	April 15	TNN
4	Ford Credit 125	Mesa Marin Raceway, Bakersfield	April 22	ABC
5	Maxx Race Cards 200	Portland Speedway, Portland	May 5	TNN
6	Jerr Dan/Nelson 150	Evergreen Speedway, Monroe	May 13	TNN
7	Western Auto 200	I-70 Speedway, Odessa	May 27	TNN
8	Ford Credit 200	Louisville Motor Speedway, Louisville	June 3	ESPN
9	Pizza Plus 150	Bristol International Raceway, Bristol	June 23	ESPN
10	Sears Auto Center 125	Milwaukee Mile, West Allis	July 1	CBS
11	Total Petroleum 200	Colorado National Speedway, Erie	July 15	CBS
12	Heartland Tailgate 175	Heartland Park Topeka, Topeka	July 29	TNN
13	Action Packed Racing Cards 150	Indianapolis Raceway Park, Clermont	August 3	ESPN
14	Stevens Beil/Genuine Car Parts 150	Flemington Speedway, Flemington	August 19	TNN
15	Fas Mart Supertruck Shootout	Richmond International Raceway, Richmond	September 7	ESPN
16	Goody's 150	Martinsville Speedway, Martinsville	September 25	ESPN
17	Lowe's 150	North Wilkesboro Speedway, North Wilkesboro	September 30	ESPN
18	Subway 100	Sears Point Raceway, Sonoma	October 7	TNN
19	Spears Manufacturing 200	Mesa Marin Raceway, Bakersfield	October 15	TNN
20	GM Goodwrench/Delco Battery 200	Phoenix International Raceway, Avondale	October 28	TNN
	NASCAR Supertruck 25	Homestead-Miami Speedway, Homestead	November 4	TBS

== Season summary ==
The Skoal Bandit Copper World Classic, the first SuperTruck race to be run, was an 80-lap race held February 5 at Phoenix International Raceway. The second race of the year at Tucson Raceway Park was the first Truck race to have a green–white–checker finish. Mike Skinner led the Maxx Race Cards 200 at Portland Speedway from flag to flag (all 200 laps), while the No. 58 of Wayne Jacks rolled over after hitting a large tractor tire that separated pit road from the race track. In the Total Petroleum 200 at Colorado National Speedway, the margin of victory by Butch Miller over Mike Skinner was officially .001 of a second. Replays during the telecast on CBS showed a virtual dead heat between Miller and Skinner at the checkered flag. In the following race at Heartland Park Topeka, the No. 51 of Kerry Teague was injured in a crash on lap 9 after the throttle hung on his Chevrolet. His truck then spun driver's side first into the wall, making the truck slightly airborne. Teague was airlifted to a local hospital for precautionary reasons. At Indianapolis Raceway Park in the Action Packed Racing Cards 150, on the last lap of the race, the No. 77 of Gary St. Amant (who finished 11th) spun out off of turn 2 and hit a light pole in the infield, knocking out a cluster of lights in the process. The same exact lights were knocked out the next evening during the Busch Grand National race by Chris Diamond; Mike Skinner lead flag to flag again (all 150 laps). The Stevens Beil/Genuine Car Parts 150 at Flemington Speedway saw the race was lengthened to 151 laps due to a green–white–checker finish; the race was Jack Sprague's debut for Hendrick Motorsports.

The Lowe's 150 at North Wilkesboro Speedway on September 30 saw the Truck debut of Ernie Irvan, who had been out of racing for over a year because of critical injuries suffered in practice for the 1994 GM Goodwrench 400 at Michigan International Speedway. Irvan qualified his No. 28 on the outside pole and led 24 laps. However, his truck was unable to answer the call after the halftime break and was credited with a 30th-place finish. The next day, Irvan made his comeback to the Winston Cup Series in a second Texaco/Havoline Ford for Robert Yates Racing, the No. 88. In the following race at Sears Point Raceway, Ray Daniels in the No. 34 truck flipped out of the course coming to rest on the tire wall after hitting the tires coming out of Turn 10. Daniels was uninjured. Ron Hornaday Jr. led all 40 laps en route to the win.

== Results and standings ==
=== Races ===
No.	Race	Pole position	Most laps led	Winning driver	Winning manufacturer
1	Skoal Bandit Copper World Classic	Ron Hornaday Jr.	Ron Hornaday Jr.	Mike Skinner	Chevrolet
2	Racing Champions 200	Mike Skinner	Ron Hornaday Jr.	Ron Hornaday Jr.	Chevrolet
3	Scott Irvin Chevrolet/Craftsman 200	Mike Skinner	Mike Skinner	Ken Schrader	Chevrolet
4	Ford Credit 125	Mike Skinner	Ron Hornaday Jr.	Ron Hornaday Jr.	Chevrolet
5	Maxx Race Cards 200	Mike Skinner	Mike Skinner	Mike Skinner	Chevrolet
6	Jerr Dan/Nelson 150	Mike Skinner; Steve Portenga*	Ron Hornaday Jr.	Ron Hornaday Jr.	Chevrolet
7	Western Auto 200	Ron Hornaday Jr.**	Mike Skinner	Mike Skinner	Chevrolet
8	Ford Credit 200	Mike Skinner; Jack Sprague*	Mike Skinner	Mike Skinner	Chevrolet
9	Pizza Plus 150	Mike Skinner	Sammy Swindell	Joe Ruttman	Ford
10	Sears Auto Center 125	Mike Skinner	Mike Skinner	Mike Skinner	Chevrolet
11	Total Petroleum 200	Ron Hornaday Jr.	Ron Hornaday Jr.	Butch Miller	Ford
12	Heartland Tailgate 175	Ron Hornaday Jr.	Ron Hornaday Jr.	Ron Hornaday Jr.	Chevrolet
13	Action Packed Racing Cards 150	Mike Skinner	Mike Skinner	Mike Skinner	Chevrolet
14	Stevens Beil/Genuine Car Parts 150	Joe Ruttman	Ron Hornaday Jr.	Ron Hornaday Jr.	Chevrolet
15	Fas Mart Supertruck Shootout	Terry Labonte	Geoff Bodine	Terry Labonte	Chevrolet
16	Goody's 150	Mike Skinner**	Mike Skinner	Joe Ruttman	Ford
17	Lowe's 150	Mike Skinner	Geoff Bodine	Mike Bliss	Ford
18	Subway 100	Ron Hornaday Jr.	Ron Hornaday Jr.	Ron Hornaday Jr.	Chevrolet
19	Spears Manufacturing 200	Bill Sedgwick	Ron Hornaday Jr.	Mike Skinner	Chevrolet
20	GM Goodwrench/Delco Battery 200	Jack Sprague	Mike Skinner	Mike Skinner	Chevrolet
	NASCAR Supertruck 25	Mike Skinner; Jimmy Hensley*	Mike Skinner	Geoff Bodine	Ford
* - Qualifying was redrawn after time trials; second named driver actually started first. ** - No time trials due to rain

=== Driver standings ===
Pos.	Driver	Races																				Points
Pos.	Driver	PHO	TUS	SGS	MMR	POR	EVG	I70	LVL	BRI	MLW	CNS	HPT	IRP	FLM	RCH	MAR	NWS	SON	MMR	PHO	Points
1	Mike Skinner	1*	**27**	**5***	**4**	**1***	**4**	1*	1*	**20**	**1***	2	5	**1***	3	3	2*	**10**	3	1	1*	3224
2	Joe Ruttman	8	4	13	8	2	2	4	2	1	6	6	2	6	**7**	4	1	6	12	5	8	3098
3	Ron Hornaday Jr.	**9**	1*	6	1*	9	1*	14	16	9	3	**3***	**1***	19	1*	15	13	5	**1***	15*	5	2986
4	Butch Miller	7	9	4	5	3	3	3	3	3	18	1	8	12	14	35	25	2	7	6	22	2812
5	Jack Sprague	6	5	14	6	10	23	7	9	6	9	8	7	28	4	10	20	4	11	4	**6**	2740
6	Rick Carelli	24	3	9	12	8	8	6	5	23	4	7	11	3	2	12	29	12	15	11	11	2683
7	Bill Sedgwick	12	8	3	2	7	15	8	11	5	5	4	15	27	5	33	8	25	6	**9**	10	2681
8	Mike Bliss	14	19		3	5	5	13	7	14	13	27	9	7	6	9	7	1	8	2	12	2636
9	Scott Lagasse	11	6	17	9	21	14	12	21	8	14	14	12	5	25	36	16	9	4	7	13	2470
10	Tobey Butler	25	17	8	13	4	18	11	4	11	28	13	16	29	8	20	33	15	5	13	20	2358
11	Bob Strait	15	24	10	11	12	11	9	8	7	11	22	24	9	11	21	28	32	23		21	2182
12	Sammy Swindell	17	7	24	10	13	17	24	13	4*	12	26	21	33	10	17	36	24	10	32	39	2109
13	Steve Portenga		22		21	19	12	5	6	24	20	9	25	17	16	14	11	13	16	24	26	2048
14	Walker Evans	29	18	21	27	23	28	22		12	16	10	17	16		37	34	28	13	23	23	1744
15	Bob Keselowski	22	28	11	7	11	20	10	19	10	25		29	15		29	10	20			25	1742
16	John Nemechek	13			26	14	27	23	22	29	17	15		8	20	19	9	22		30	19	1674
17	P. J. Jones	16	2	16	14	17	6	20	12	16	23	11	22	31								1519
18	Jerry Glanville	27	14	19	DNQ	18	22	25	14	22	21	18	32	18	17	22						1482
19	Dave Rezendes		10		19		7	2	15		8	5	26		9				9		14	1453
20	Geoff Bodine	5		2		6				2				25		2*	15	3*		26	3	1436
21	T. J. Clark	32	23		DNQ		29			21	19	21	33	22		30	12		14	18	40	1235
22	Kerry Teague	19	13	20	17	25	19	17		13	27	23	30		22							1221
23	John Kinder			23	15	22	13	19	17		26	28		34	13	38				31		1183
24	Bob Brevak								18	18	24	24	20	20	12	23	17	DNQ		12	28	1182
25	Mike Hurlbert	26	16	DNQ	DNQ	26	25	16	20			16							21	21	24	1146
26	Johnny Benson	10									7			2		11	3	DNQ		10	17	1049
27	Kenny Allen										15	20	31	13	23	26	24	DNQ	17	17	DNQ	992
28	Dennis Setzer										2	12		10	21	34	26	16			35	850
29	Ken Schrader	3		1			INJ									5	32	14		35	27	828
30	Mike Chase									27					24	28	18	19	19	28	16	767
31	Michael Dokken							21					18	26	15	DNQ	21	17		33	DNQ	753
32	Todd Bodine												4			6	6	7		8		748
33	Jerry Churchill	23	12	15	23	24	26			19												715
34	Rodney Combs										10			4		16	14	11				660
35	Steve McEachern	28	15		DNQ			18		26							19	DNQ				613
36	Ray Daniels											25	19	21					20	16	DNQ	543
37	Terry Labonte	2											3			1						515
38	Wayne Jacks		29		22	20													18	14		506
39	Butch Gilliland	31	26	7	29								13									501
40	Troy Beebe	30	25	12	25		16															491
41	Darrell Waltrip												6			8	35	21				450
42	Gary Collins	20	21		20		10															440
43	Ron Esau						9	26			29									20	DNQ	427
44	Kenny Wallace																4	8			15	420
45	Ernie Irvan																DNQ	30		3	2	408
46	Roger Mears	21			16									24						29		382
47	Randy Churchill							15	10	15												370
48	Frank Davis								24						19	DNQ	23	DNQ				368
49	Pancho Carter			DNQ	28	16																349
50	Tommy Archer	18											10			27						325
51	Jimmy Dick											17			18					22		318
52	Dennis Wooldridge					15	24					19										315
53	Hermie Sadler															13	5					279
54	Rodney Combs Jr.															18	31	23				273
55	Jimmy Hensley									25								18			30	270
56	Todd Massey															25	22	DNQ				249
57	Carlos Serrano													30						19	31	249
58	Mark Gibson		11	22																		227
59	Ernest Winslow															DNQ		26			DNQ	220
60	Tony Roper										22					DNQ	27					219
61	Bob Jones				DNQ								27									213
62	Joe Bessey	4																			38	209
63	Bob Walker			18	24																	200
64	Gary St. Amant													11		31						200
65	Tim Nooner									28				14								200
66	G. T. Tallas																		22	34	DNQ	186
67	Stan Fox		30		18																	182
68	Wally Dallenbach Jr.																		2			170
69	Chad Little															32	DNQ	DNQ				162
70	Ted Musgrave																				4	160
71	Dave Marcis																				7	146
72	Derrike Cope															7						146
73	John Borneman	33																			29	140
74	David Green																				9	138
75	Mark Simo												14									121
76	Dirk Stephens																	27				119
77	Gary Lloyd																DNQ	31				119
78	Bill Venturini																	DNQ			34	116
79	Kirk Shelmerdine									17												112
80	Garrett Evans																			36	36	110
81	A. J. Foyt																				18	109
82	Kenji Momota																	DNQ			37	104
83	Lou Gigliotti		20																			103
84	Kevin Harvick																			27	DNQ	101
85	Gary Herrin						21															100
86	Andy Genzman																DNQ	DNQ				95
87	Frank Kimmel								23													94
88	Rick Hendrick												23									94
89	Andy Brass													23								94
90	Bugs Hairfield															24						91
91	Boris Said																		24			91
92	Bill Cooper																		25			88
93	Ricky Johnson																			25		88
94	Dennis Dyer																		26			85
95	Davy Jones												28									79
96	Mike Wallace																	29				76
97	Dave Ashley				30																	73
98	Barry Bodine																30					73
99	Steve Darne													32								67
100	Dave Smith																				32	67
101	Andy Hillenburg																				33	64
102	Freddie Query																DNQ					40
103	Scott Hansen																				DNQ	3
Pos.	Driver	PHO	TUS	SGS	MMR	POR	EVG	I70	LVL	BRI	MLW	CNS	HPT	IRP	FLM	RCH	MAR	NWS	SON	MMR	PHO	Points
Pos.	Driver	Races																				Points

Key
Color	Result
Gold	Winner
Silver	Finished 2nd–5th
Bronze	Finished 6th–10th
Green	Finished 11th–20th
Blue	Finished 21st or worse
Purple	Did not finish (DNF)
Black	Disqualified (DSQ)
Red	Did not qualify (DNQ)
Tan	Withdrew From Race (Wth)
White	Qualified for another driver (QL)
White	Qualified but replaced due to injury or incident (INQ)
White	Relieved another driver (RL)
Blank	Did not participate (DNP)
Blank	Excluded (EX)
Blank	Did not arrive (DNA)

**Bold** – Pole position awarded by time.
Italics – Pole position earned by points standings or by practice speeds.
* – Most laps led.
^{1} – Post entry, driver and owner did not score points.
Note: DNQ data for this season is incomplete.

== See also ==
- 1995 NASCAR Winston Cup Series
- 1995 NASCAR Busch Series
- 1994–95 NASCAR SuperTruck Series exhibition races
- 1995 NASCAR Winston West Series
