= 2000 Pennzoil 400 =

Auto race held at Homestead-Miami Speedway in 2000

Race details
- Race 33 of 34 in the 2000 NASCAR Winston Cup Series season
- 2000 Pennzoil 400 program cover
- Date: November 12, 2000
- Location: Homestead Miami Speedway (Homestead, Florida)
- Course: Permanent racing facility
- Course length: 1.5 miles (2.4 km)
- Distance: 267 laps, 400.5 mi (644.52 km)
- Weather: Very hot with temperatures of 80.6 °F (27.0 °C); wind speeds of 7 miles per hour (11 km/h)
- Average speed: 127.48 miles per hour (205.16 km/h)

Pole position
Driver	Steve Park	Dale Earnhardt, Inc.
- Time: 34.518

Most laps led
Driver	Tony Stewart	Joe Gibbs Racing
- Laps: 155

Winner
No. 20	Tony Stewart	Joe Gibbs Racing

Television in the United States
- Network: NBC
- Announcers: Allen Bestwick; Benny Parsons

The 2000 Pennzoil 400 was a NASCAR Winston Cup event that occurred on November 12, 2000. The race is known for Bobby Labonte clinching his first Winston Cup title by finishing 4th. Tony Stewart won the race, leading 166 of the 267 laps run. Steve Park was on the Pole.

Lasting for three hours and eight minutes, the race would be slowed down four times for a duration of 25 laps; or 9% of the total race. The average green flag duration was slightly more than 48 laps. Six drivers were involved in terminal crashes; including last-place finisher Scott Pruett. Eight drivers failed to qualify for this race; including Kyle Petty. Morgan Shepherd withdrew from the race even though he had a good chance of qualifying.

The race was televised by NBC Sports for the second consecutive year. Its coverage team for this event would consist mostly of the same personnel that would begin broadcasting races for the network as part of its entry into full-time NASCAR broadcasting in 2001. Allen Bestwick, who had also broadcast the 1999 edition of this race for NBC, was the lead commentator in the race. Making his debut for NBC as the analyst was soon-to-be-former ESPN analyst Benny Parsons. Marty Snider and Mike Massaro would again be the pit reporters; this was Massaro's last NASCAR race for NBC until the network regained rights to the Cup Series in 2015.

== Entry list ==
No.	Driver	Make	Team
1	Steve Park	Chevrolet	Dale Earnhardt, Inc.
01	Ted Musgrave	Chevrolet	SABCO Racing
2	Rusty Wallace	Ford	Penske-Kranefuss Racing
3	Dale Earnhardt	Chevrolet	Richard Childress Racing
4	Bobby Hamilton	Chevrolet	Morgan–McClure Motorsports
5	Terry Labonte	Chevrolet	Hendrick Motorsports
6	Mark Martin	Ford	Roush Racing
7	Michael Waltrip	Chevrolet	Mattei Motorsports
8	Dale Earnhardt Jr.	Chevrolet	Dale Earnhardt, Inc.
9	Stacy Compton	Ford	Melling Racing
10	Johnny Benson Jr.	Pontiac	Tyler Jet Motorsports
11	Brett Bodine	Ford	Brett Bodine Racing
12	Jeremy Mayfield	Ford	Penske-Kranefuss Racing
14	Rick Mast	Pontiac	A.J. Foyt Racing
16	Kevin Lepage	Ford	Roush Racing
17	Matt Kenseth	Ford	Roush Racing
18	Bobby Labonte	Pontiac	Joe Gibbs Racing
19	Casey Atwood	Ford	Evernham Motorsports
20	Tony Stewart	Pontiac	Joe Gibbs Racing
21	Elliott Sadler	Ford	Wood Brothers Racing
22	Ward Burton	Pontiac	Bill Davis Racing
24	Jeff Gordon	Chevrolet	Hendrick Motorsports
25	Jerry Nadeau	Chevrolet	Hendrick Motorsports
26	Jimmy Spencer	Ford	Haas-Carter Motorsports
27	Mike Bliss	Pontiac	Eel River Racing
28	Ricky Rudd	Ford	Robert Yates Racing
31	Mike Skinner	Chevrolet	Richard Childress Racing
32	Scott Pruett	Ford	PPI Motorsports
33	Joe Nemechek	Chevrolet	Andy Petree Racing
36	Ken Schrader	Pontiac	MB2 Motorsports
40	Sterling Marlin	Chevrolet	SABCO Racing
43	John Andretti	Pontiac	Petty Enterprises
44	Steve Grissom	Pontiac	Petty Enterprises
45	Kyle Petty	Pontiac	Petty Enterprises
50	Ricky Craven	Chevrolet	Midwest Transit Racing
55	Kenny Wallace	Chevrolet	Andy Petree Racing
57	Bobby Hamilton Jr.	Chevrolet	Bobby Hamilton Racing
60	Hermie Sadler	Chevrolet	Joe Bessey Motorsports
66	Darrell Waltrip	Ford	Haas-Carter Motorsports
71	Dave Marcis	Chevrolet	Marcis Auto Racing
75	Wally Dallenbach Jr.	Ford	Galaxy Motorsports
77	Robert Pressley	Ford	Jasper Motorsports
84	Norm Benning	Chevrolet	Norm Benning Racing
88	Dale Jarrett	Ford	Robert Yates Racing
90	Hut Stricklin	Ford	Donlavey Racing
93	Dave Blaney	Pontiac	Bill Davis Racing
94	Bill Elliott	Ford	Bill Elliott Racing
96	Andy Houston	Ford	PPI Motorsports
97	Kurt Busch	Ford	Roush Racing
98	Geoff Bodine	Ford	MacPherson Motorsports
99	Jeff Burton	Ford	Roush Racing

== Qualifying results ==
Pos.	Car	Driver	Manufacturer	Time	Speed
1	1	Steve Park	Chevrolet	34.518	156.440
2	28	Ricky Rudd	Ford	34.525	156.408
3	18	Bobby Labonte	Pontiac	34.566	156.223
4	26	Jimmy Spencer	Ford	34.573	156.191
5	19	Casey Atwood	Ford	34.678	155.718
6	33	Joe Nemechek	Chevrolet	34.721	155.525
7	88	Dale Jarrett	Ford	34.736	155.458
8	22	Ward Burton	Pontiac	34.741	155.436
9	11	Brett Bodine	Ford	34.753	155.382
10	97	Kurt Busch	Ford	34.782	155.253
11	6	Mark Martin	Ford	34.786	155.235
12	8	Dale Earnhardt Jr.	Chevrolet	34.790	155.217
13	20	Tony Stewart	Pontiac	34.793	155.204
14	10	Johnny Benson Jr.	Pontiac	34.809	155.132
15	40	Sterling Marlin	Chevrolet	34.829	155.043
16	43	John Andretti	Pontiac	34.836	155.012
17	2	Rusty Wallace	Ford	34.840	154.994
18	31	Mike Skinner	Chevrolet	34.848	154.959
19	93	Dave Blaney	Pontiac	34.872	154.852
20	9	Stacy Compton	Ford	34.872	154.852
21	25	Jerry Nadeau	Chevrolet	34.893	154.759
22	12	Jeremy Mayfield	Ford	34.908	154.692
23	94	Bill Elliott	Ford	34.921	154.635
24	66	Darrell Waltrip	Ford	34.921	154.635
25	14	Rick Mast	Pontiac	34.948	154.515
26	77	Robert Pressley	Ford	34.955	154.484
27	21	Elliott Sadler	Ford	35.003	154.272
28	24	Jeff Gordon	Chevrolet	35.019	154.202
29	96	Andy Houston	Ford	35.051	154.061
30	57	Bobby Hamilton Jr.	Chevrolet	35.056	154.039
31	99	Jeff Burton	Ford	35.057	154.035
32	75	Wally Dallenbach Jr.	Ford	35.062	154.013
33	16	Kevin Lepage	Ford	35.063	154.008
34	32	Scott Pruett	Ford	35.080	153.934
35	27	Mike Bliss	Pontiac	35.094	153.872
36	98	Geoff Bodine	Ford	35.098	153.855
Provisionals
37	3	Dale Earnhardt	Chevrolet		
38	17	Matt Kenseth	Ford		
39	5	Terry Labonte	Chevrolet		
40	36	Ken Schrader	Pontiac		
41	7	Michael Waltrip	Chevrolet		
42	55	Kenny Wallace	Chevrolet		
43	4	Bobby Hamilton	Chevrolet		
Failed to qualify
44	45	Kyle Petty	Pontiac		
45	90	Hut Stricklin	Ford		
46	50	Ricky Craven	Chevrolet		
47	71	Dave Marcis	Chevrolet		
48	44	Steve Grissom	Pontiac		
49	84	Norm Benning	Chevrolet		
50	60	Hermie Sadler	Chevrolet		
51	01	Ted Musgrave	Chevrolet		

== Race results ==
Fin	St	No.	Driver	Make	Team	Laps	Led	Status	Pts	Winnings
1	13	20	Tony Stewart	Pontiac	Joe Gibbs Racing	267	166	running	185	291325
2	22	12	Jeremy Mayfield	Ford	Penske-Kranefuss Racing	267	25	running	175	206825
3	11	6	Mark Martin	Ford	Roush Racing	267	0	running	165	161625
4	3	18	Bobby Labonte	Pontiac	Joe Gibbs Racing	267	2	running	165	129575
5	4	26	Jimmy Spencer	Ford	Haas-Carter Motorsports	267	15	running	160	105575
6	2	28	Ricky Rudd	Ford	Robert Yates Racing	267	49	running	155	86375
7	28	24	Jeff Gordon	Chevy	Hendrick Motorsports	266	0	running	146	83725
8	1	1	Steve Park	Chevy	Dale Earnhardt, Inc.	266	9	running	147	70375
9	19	93	Dave Blaney	Pontiac	Bill Davis Racing	265	0	running	138	48625
10	5	19	Casey Atwood	Ford	Evernham Motorsports	265	0	running	134	47925
11	31	99	Jeff Burton	Ford	Roush Racing	265	0	running	130	61225
12	21	25	Jerry Nadeau	Chevy	Hendrick Motorsports	265	0	running	127	52825
13	12	8	Dale Earnhardt Jr.	Chevy	Dale Earnhardt, Inc.	265	0	running	124	49525
14	9	11	Brett Bodine	Ford	Brett Bodine Racing	265	0	running	121	39325
15	17	2	Rusty Wallace	Ford	Penske-Kranefuss Racing	265	0	running	118	57500
16	26	77	Robert Pressley	Ford	Jasper Motorsports	265	0	running	115	45800
17	7	88	Dale Jarrett	Ford	Robert Yates Racing	265	0	running	112	63300
18	6	33	Joe Nemechek	Chevy	Andy Petree Racing	264	0	running	109	52700
19	10	97	Kurt Busch	Ford	Roush Racing	264	0	running	106	50300
20	37	3	Dale Earnhardt	Chevy	Richard Childress Racing	264	0	running	103	60700
21	38	17	Matt Kenseth	Ford	Roush Racing	264	0	running	100	50500
22	23	94	Bill Elliott	Ford	Bill Elliott Racing	264	0	running	97	49400
23	18	31	Mike Skinner	Chevy	Richard Childress Racing	264	0	running	94	49100
24	42	55	Kenny Wallace	Chevy	Andy Petree Racing	264	0	running	91	49900
25	39	5	Terry Labonte	Chevy	Hendrick Motorsports	264	0	running	88	55100
26	15	40	Sterling Marlin	Chevy	SABCO Racing	264	0	running	85	48700
27	33	16	Kevin Lepage	Ford	Roush Racing	264	0	running	82	48000
28	27	21	Elliott Sadler	Ford	Wood Brothers Racing	263	1	running	84	47700
29	25	14	Rick Mast	Pontiac	A.J. Foyt Racing	263	0	running	76	36300
30	14	10	Johnny Benson Jr.	Pontiac	Tyler Jet Motorsports	262	0	running	73	39700
31	43	4	Bobby Hamilton	Chevy	Morgan–McClure Motorsports	262	0	running	70	46900
32	40	36	Ken Schrader	Pontiac	MB2 Motorsports	261	0	running	67	38700
33	30	57	Bobby Hamilton Jr.	Chevy	Bobby Hamilton Racing	261	0	running	64	35500
34	41	7	Michael Waltrip	Chevy	Mattei Motorsports	261	0	running	61	45800
35	32	75	Wally Dallenbach Jr.	Ford	Galaxy Motorsports	260	0	running	58	35100
36	24	66	Darrell Waltrip	Ford	Haas-Carter Motorsports	94	0	handling	55	34900
37	16	43	John Andretti	Pontiac	Petty Enterprises	78	0	engine	52	52700
38	20	9	Stacy Compton	Ford	Melling Racing	58	0	crash	49	34500
39	8	22	Ward Burton	Pontiac	Bill Davis Racing	31	0	crash	46	52300
40	35	27	Mike Bliss	Pontiac	Eel River Racing	31	0	crash	43	34075
41	36	98	Geoffrey Bodine	Ford	MacPherson Motorsports	31	0	crash	40	33875
42	29	96	Andy Houston	Ford	PPI Motorsports	23	0	crash	37	34075
43	34	32	Scott Pruett	Ford	PPI Motorsports	23	0	crash	34	33375

== Timeline ==
Section reference:

- Start of race: Steve Park started the race as the pole position driver.
- Lap 10: Jimmy Spencer took over the lead from Steve Park; ultimately losing it to Ricky Rudd on lap 25.
- Lap 23: Andy Houston and Scott Pruett were jointly involved in a terminal crash; forcing them out of the race.
- Lap 26: Caution flag due to Scott Pruett and Andy Houston's accident; green flag racing resumed on lap 31.
- Lap 28: Jeremy Mayfield took over the lead from Elliott Sadler before losing it to Tony Stewart on lap 53.
- Lap 31: Ward Burton, Mike Bliss, and Geoffrey Bodine were jointly involved in a terminal crash; knocking them out the event prematurely.
- Lap 33: Caution flag due to a four-car accident; green flag racing resumed on lap 39.
- Lap 53: Tony Stewart took over the lead from Jeremy Mayfield before losing it to Ricky Rudd on lap 91.
- Lap 58: Stacy Compton's vehicle suffered from a terminal crash; ending his weekend on the track.
- Lap 78: John Andretti's vehicle developed major engine issues.
- Lap 94: The handling on Darrell Waltrip's vehicle became problematic; ending his day on the track.
- Lap 97: Tony Stewart took over the lead from Ricky Rudd before losing it back to Ricky Rudd on lap 149.
- Lap 153: Ricky Rudd took over the lead from Bobby Labonte before losing it to Tony Stewart on lap 184.
- Lap 184: Tony Stewart took over the lead from Ricky Rudd before losing it back to Ricky Rudd on lap 211.
- Lap 210: Caution due to debris; green flag racing resumed on lap 218.
- Lap 219: Tony Stewart took over the lead from Ricky Rudd; dominating the remainder of the race.
- Lap 224: Caution due to debris; green flag racing resumed on lap 226.
- Finish: Tony Stewart won the race after two accidents and two cautions for debris, Bobby Labonte officially clinches the championship with one race remaining.

== Standings after the race ==
Pos	Driver	Points	Differential
1	Bobby Labonte	4970	0
2	Jeff Burton	4714	-256
3	Dale Earnhardt	4690	-280
4	Dale Jarrett	4561	-409
5	Tony Stewart	4521	-449
6	Ricky Rudd	4484	-486
7	Rusty Wallace	4398	-572
8	Mark Martin	4362	-608
9	Jeff Gordon	4196	-774
10	Ward Burton	3982	-988
