= 1995 Total Petroleum 200 =

Race details
- Race 11 of 20 in the 1995 NASCAR SuperTruck Series season
- Date: July 15, 1995
- Location: Colorado National Speedway, Dacono, Colorado
- Course: Permanent racing facility
- Course length: 0.375 miles (0.673 km)
- Distance: 200 laps, 75 mi (120.7 km)
- Weather: Temperatures reaching up to 81 °F (27 °C); wind speeds approaching 9.9 miles per hour (15.9 km/h)
- Average speed: 56.086 miles per hour (90.262 km/h)

Pole position
Driver	Ron Hornaday Jr.	Dale Earnhardt, Inc.

Most laps led
Driver	Ron Hornaday Jr.	Dale Earnhardt, Inc.
- Laps: 170

Winner
No. 98	Butch Miller	Jim Herrick

Television in the United States
- Network: CBS
- Announcers: Ken Squier

The 1995 Total Petroleum 200 took place on July 15 at Colorado National Speedway in Dacono, Colorado.

This event was 200 laps long and it was the eleventh race (first season) of the series where it held the closest margin of victory in the history of the NASCAR SuperTruck Series. As Butch Miller and Mike Skinner were side by side on the last lap of the race, as Miller won the race by 0.001 of a second, it was Miller's only victory.

The closest margin of victory since then was in the 2010 Mountain Dew 250 at Talladega Superspeedway, as Kyle Busch beat Aric Almirola by 0.002 of a second. It was the closest margin of victory among NASCAR's three national series until February 17, 2018 when Tyler Reddick beat Elliott Sadler by 0.0004 of a second in the Xfinity Series race at Daytona.

== Results ==
1. 98-Butch Miller
2. 3-Mike Skinner
3. 16-Ron Hornaday Jr. (pole sitter)
4. 75-Bill Sedgwick
5. 7-Dave Rezendes
6. 84-Joe Ruttman
7. 6-Rick Carelli
8. 31-Jack Sprague
9. 83-Steve Portenga
10. 20-Walker Evans
11. 1-P. J. Jones
12. 30-Dennis Setzer
13. 21-Tobey Butler
14. 24-Scott Lagasse
15. 87-John Nemechek
16. 11-Mike Hurlbert
17. 79-Jimmy Dick
18. 81-Jerry Glanville
19. 10-Dennis Wooldridge
20. 64-Kenny Allen
21. 23-T. J. Clark
22. 37-Bob Strait
23. 51-Kerry Teague
24. 4-Bob Brevak
25. 34-Raymond Daniels
26. 38-Sammy Swindell
27. 08-Mike Bliss
28. 14-John Kinder

== Notes ==
- Time of race: 1 hour 20 minutes and 14 seconds
- Average speed: 56.086 mph
- Pole speed: 78.566 mph set by Ron Hornaday Jr.
- Cautions: 9 for 43 laps
- Margin of victory: .001 sec (closest in Truck Series history)

== Quotes ==
- "Too close to call"

-Ken Squier instated about the finish during the CBS Sports coverage of the race.
