= 1995 Skoal Bandit Copper World Classic =

First NASCAR truck series race

Race details
- Race 1 of 20 in the 1995 NASCAR SuperTruck Series season
- Layout of Phoenix International Raceway
- Date: February 5, 1995
- Official name: 18th Annual Skoal Bandit Copper World Classic
- Location: Phoenix International Raceway, Avondale, Arizona
- Course: Permanent racing facility
- Course length: 1 miles (1.609 km)
- Distance: 80 laps, 80 mi (128.748 km)
- Average speed: 87.565 mph (140.922 km/h)

Pole position
Driver	Ron Hornaday Jr.	Dale Earnhardt, Inc.

Most laps led
Driver	Mike Skinner	Richard Childress Racing
- Laps: 30

Winner
No. 3	Mike Skinner	Richard Childress Racing

Television in the United States
- Network: TNN
- Announcers: Mike Joy, Buddy Baker, Ernie Irvan

The 1995 Skoal Bandit Copper World Classic was a pickup truck race held on February 5, 1995 at the Phoenix International Raceway in Avondale, Arizona. It was the first event of the 1995 NASCAR SuperTruck Series, the first season of what is now the NASCAR Craftsman Truck Series, and the first edition of what is now the Craftsman 150.

Ron Hornaday Jr. of Dale Earnhardt, Inc. won the pole position, while Mike Skinner of Richard Childress Racing won the race after leading a race-high 30 laps.

== Background ==
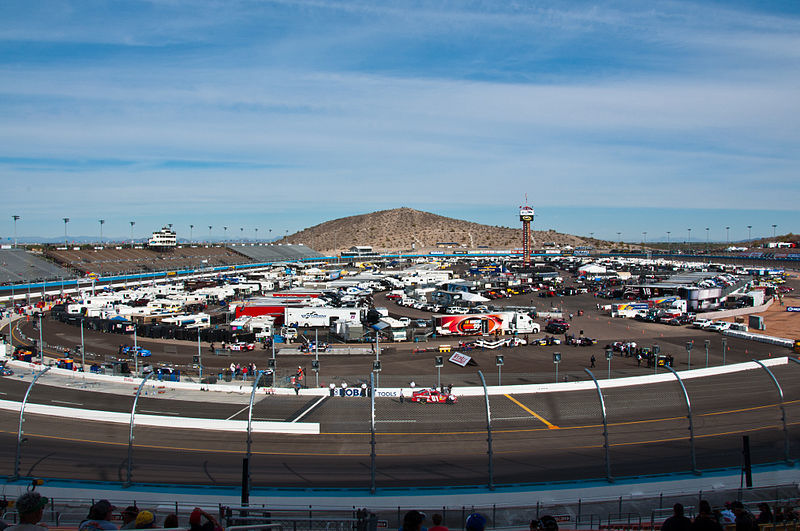
Phoenix International Raceway (pictured in 2011), the site of the Copper World Classic

Phoenix International Raceway, which opened in 1964, began hosting NASCAR Winston Cup Series races in 1988. The track is 1-mile (1.6-kilometre) long; the banking in turns 1–2 and the backstretch is 10–11 degrees, while the dogleg and turns 3–4 are 8–9° and the frontstretch is 3°.

The Truck Series was planned in 1991 and officially created in 1994. During the year, seven exhibition races were held and broadcast by TNN under the Winter Heat Series banner. TNN returned to cover the Copper World Classic. Regarding Phoenix being the site of the series' inaugural race, Ron Hornaday stated, "Phoenix fits right into a lot of these drivers' hands because they all came from short tracks."

The race was one of five held for the 18th Annual Skoal Bandit Copper World Classic. Various drivers were attracted to the event, including Cup Series drivers Ken Schrader, Geoff Bodine and Terry Labonte, the latter having won the Cup race at Phoenix in 1994. Other drivers included off-road racing champion Roger Mears and former National Football League head coach Jerry Glanville. In the field of 33 drivers that competed in the race, Hornaday, Mike Skinner, Joe Ruttman, Butch Miller, Jack Sprague, Rick Carelli, Bill Sedgwick, Scott Lagasse, Tobey Butler and Sammy Swindell would eventually compete in all twenty races in the 1995 season.

== Qualifying ==
Ron Hornaday won the pole with a lap speed of 123.665 miles per hour (199.020 km/h). Ken Schrader (122.695 mph (197.458 km/h)), Terry Labonte (122.324 mph (196.861 km/h)), Johnny Benson Jr. (122.266 mph (196.768 km/h)) and Joe Bessey (122.220 mph (196.694 km/h)) rounded out the top five.

== Race ==
A crowd of 38,000 attended the race.

Ron Hornaday led the first 23 laps of the race. During that timespan, two caution flags were flown: on lap 4, Troy Beebe spun out in turn 2, and on lap 17, Gary Collins spun in turn 4. On lap 24, Terry Labonte look the lead, and after a lap, the third caution occurred when seven trucks (Tobey Butler, John Borneman, Bob Keselowski, Steve McEachern, Bill Sedgwick, Jerry Glanville and T. J. Clark) crashed in turn 4. Labonte led until lap 29, and Hornaday led for three laps. On lap 33, Mike Skinner claimed first, leading for 29 laps; Skinner lost the lead on lap 61, when a yellow flag for debris was flown. Labonte reclaimed the lead during the period. On lap 72, Sedgwick, Keselowski and Bob Strait spun in the dogleg, bringing out another caution. Five laps later, the final yellow of the race was flown when Glanville, Kerry Teague, Scott Lagasse and P. J. Jones crashed in turn 4. When the green flag waved with two laps to go, Skinner retook the lead from Labonte, and held off Labonte's attempted charge to win by .09 seconds. Ken Schrader finished third, followed by Joe Bessey, Geoff Bodine, Jack Sprague, Butch Miller, Joe Ruttman, Hornaday and Johnny Benson. Six drivers did not finish the race: Rick Carelli (engine), Walker Evans (valve), Troy Beebe (suspension), Butch Gilliland (engine), Clark and Borneman (crashes).

== Results ==
=== Race results ===
Pos	Grid	No.	Driver	Team	Manufacturer	Laps	Led	Points
1	16	3	Mike Skinner	Richard Childress Racing	Chevrolet	80	30	180
2	3	5	Terry Labonte	Hendrick Motorsports	Chevrolet	80	24	170
3	2	52	Ken Schrader	Ken Schrader Racing	Chevrolet	80	0	165
4	5	30	Joe Bessey	Grier Lackey Motorsports	Dodge	80	0	160
5	9	7	Geoff Bodine	Geoff Bodine Racing	Ford	80	0	155
6	15	31	Jack Sprague	Griffin Racing	Chevrolet	80	0	150
7	17	98	Butch Miller	Liberty Racing	Ford	80	0	146
8	7	84	Joe Ruttman	Irvan-Simo Racing	Ford	80	0	142
9	1	16	Ron Hornaday Jr.	Dale Earnhardt, Inc.	Chevrolet	80	26	138
10	4	18	Johnny Benson Jr.	Roehrig Motorsports	Chevrolet	80	0	134
11	10	24	Scott Lagasse	Hendrick Motorsports	Chevrolet	80	0	130
12	13	75	Bill Sedgwick	Spears Motorsports	Chevrolet	80	0	127
13	32	89	John Nemechek	Redding Motorsports	Chevrolet	80	0	124
14	11	08	Mike Bliss	Ultra Motorsports	Ford	80	0	121
15	20	37	Bob Strait	Strait Racing	Ford	80	0	118
16	14	1	P. J. Jones	Vestar Motorsports	Chevrolet	80	0	115
17	12	38	Sammy Swindell	Akins-Sutton Motorsports	Ford	80	0	112
18	21	03	Tommy Archer	Archer Racing	Ford	80	0	109
19	22	51	Kerry Teague	Rosenblum Racing	Chevrolet	80	0	106
20	18	74	Gary Collins	Collins Motorsports	Chevrolet	79	0	103
21	6	25	Roger Mears	Hendrick Motorsports	Chevrolet	79	0	100
22	23	29	Bob Keselowski	K-Automotive Motorsports	Dodge	79	0	97
23	27	88	Jerry Churchill	Churchill Motorsports	Ford	79	0	94
24	8	6	Rick Carelli	Chesrown Racing	Chevrolet	78	0	91
25	19	21	Tobey Butler	Venable Racing	Ford	78	0	88
26	30	11	Mike Hurlbert	RPM Racing	Ford	76	0	85
27	25	81	Jerry Glanville	Glanville Motorsports	Ford	76	0	82
28	26	54	Steve McEachern	McEachern Motorsports	Chevrolet	74	0	79
29	28	20	Walker Evans	Walker Evans Racing	Dodge	51	0	76
30	24	10	Troy Beebe	Decuir Racing	Chevrolet	31	0	73
31	31	06	Butch Gilliland	Ultra Motorsports	Ford	30	0	70
32	29	23	T. J. Clark	Clark Racing	Ford	22	0	67
33	33	8	John Borneman	Borneman Motorsports	Chevrolet	22	0	64

=== Standings after the race ===
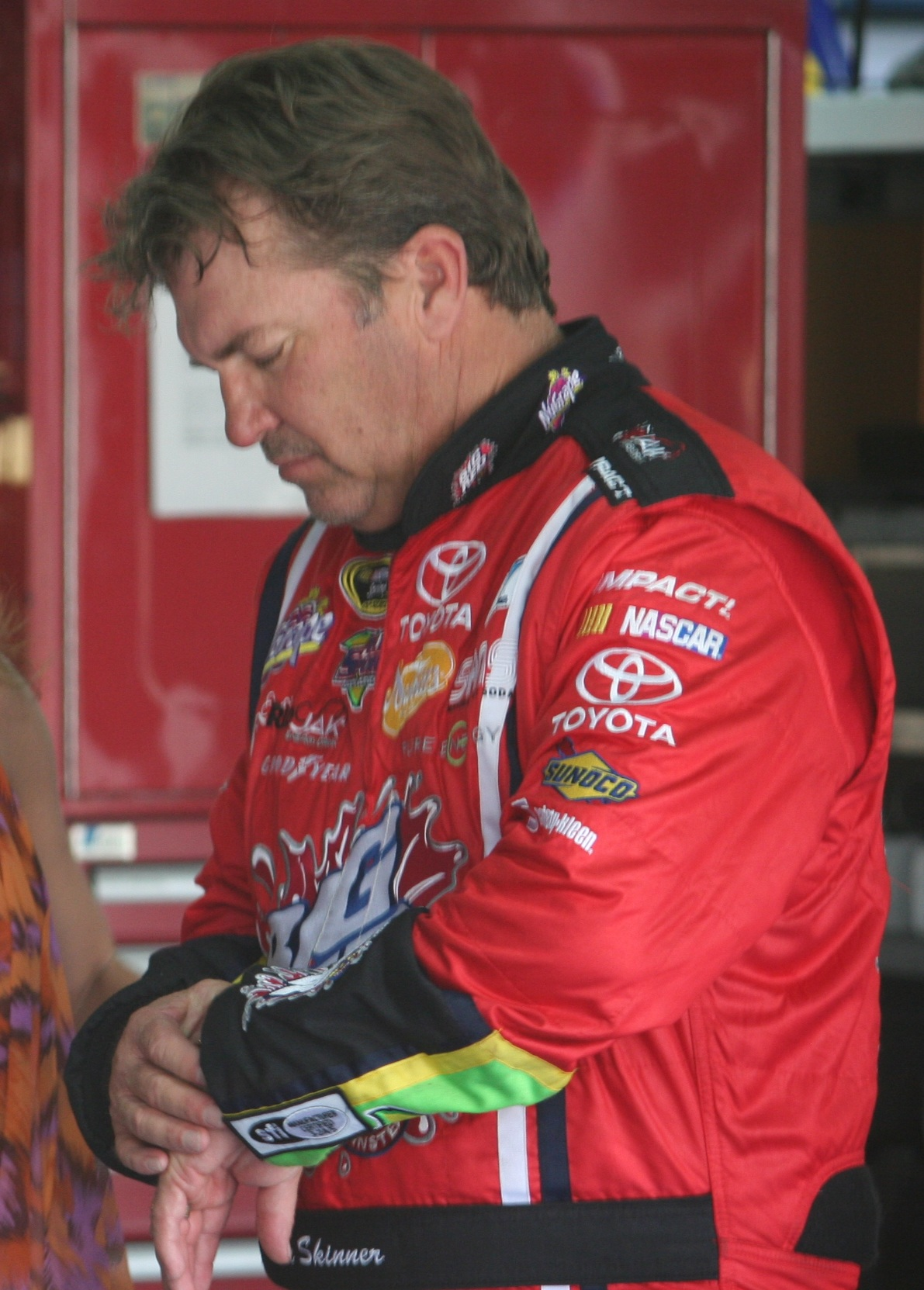
With the win, Mike Skinner (pictured in 2011) was the points leader.

Pos	Driver	Points
1	Mike Skinner	180
2	Terry Labonte	170 (−10)
3	Ken Schrader	165 (−15)
4	Joe Bessey	160 (−20)
5	Geoff Bodine	155 (−25)
6	Jack Sprague	150 (−30)
7	Butch Miller	146 (−34)
8	Joe Ruttman	142 (−38)
9	Ron Hornaday Jr.	138 (−42)
10	Johnny Benson Jr.	134 (−46)
