= 1995 Scott Irvin Chevrolet/Craftsman 200 =

Race details
- Race 3 of 20 in the 1995 NASCAR SuperTruck Series presented by Craftsman season
- Date: April 15, 1995
- Location: Saugus Speedway in Santa Clarita, California
- Course: Permanent racing facility
- Course length: 0.333 miles (0.536 km)
- Distance: 200 laps, 66.6 mi (107.1 km)
- Weather: c
- Average speed: 43.526 mph (70.048 km/h)

Pole position
Driver	Mike Skinner	Richard Childress Racing
- Time: 16.038 sec

Most laps led
Driver	Mike Skinner	Richard Childress Racing
- Laps: 115

Winner
No. 52	Ken Schrader	Dale Earnhardt, Inc.

Television in the United States
- Network: The Nashville Network
- Announcers: Glenn Jarrett and Larry McReynolds

The Scott Irvin Chevrolet/Craftsman 200 was a NASCAR SuperTruck Series presented by Craftsman race held at Saugus Speedway in Santa Clarita, California on April 15, 1995. The third of 20 races in the series' inaugural season, it was run on the shortest track the series ever competed on; it was won by Winston Cup Series regular Ken Schrader.

== Report ==
Pole position for the race was won by Mike Skinner, who was the fastest in qualifying for the second time in the series' three races to that point. Geoff Bodine qualified second, while Ken Schrader, P. J. Jones and Butch Miller filled out the top five qualifying spots. Twenty-six trucks attempted to qualify for the twenty-four truck starting grid; Pancho Carter and Mike Hurlbert failed to qualify for the event.

At a length of 0.333 miles (0.536 km), Saugus Speedway was the shortest track on the series schedule. Held before a record crowd, the race was won by Ken Schrader, driving the No. 52 Chevrolet for Ken Schrader Racing; Schrader led 54 of the race's 200 laps, and won by 1.7 seconds over Geoff Bodine. Bill Sedgwick, Butch Miller and Mike Skinner completed the top five finishers, while Ron Hornaday Jr., Butch Gilliland, Tobey Butler, Rick Carelli and Bob Strait rounded out the top ten. Early in the race Schrader was penalized to the rear of the field for causing an accident involving Jones; Jerry Glanville was given a five-lap penalty late in the race for causing an accident involving then-leader Skinner.

Nine trucks finished on the lead lap; twelve caution flags slowed the event for 18 laps. One red-flag period for oil on the track stopped the race for 28 minutes. Only two of the 24 trucks that started the race failed to finish the event, the No. 30 of Mark Gibson dropping out of the race following an accident, while the No. 14 of John Kinder retired from the event due to driver fatigue.

== Results ==
Pos	Grid	No.	Driver	Team	Manufacturer	Laps	Points
1	3	52	Ken Schrader	Ken Schrader Racing	Chevrolet	200	180
2	2	7	Geoff Bodine	Geoff Bodine Racing	Ford	200	170
3	11	75	Bill Sedgwick	Spears Motorsports	Chevrolet	200	165
4	5	98	Butch Miller	Liberty Racing	Ford	200	160
5	1	3	Mike Skinner	Richard Childress Racing	Chevrolet	200	155
6	10	16	Ron Hornaday Jr.	Dale Earnhardt, Inc.	Chevrolet	200	150
7	12	06	Butch Gilliland	Ultra Motorsports	Ford	200	146
8	8	21	Tobey Butler	Venable Racing	Ford	200	142
9	9	6	Rick Carelli	Chesrown Racing	Chevrolet	200	138
10	16	37	Bob Strait	Strait Racing	Ford	199	134
11	6	29	Bob Keselowski	K-Automotive Motorsports	Dodge	199	130
12	13	89	Troy Beebe	Redding Motorsports	Chevrolet	199	127
13	7	84	Joe Ruttman	Irvan-Simo Racing	Ford	198	124
14	15	31	Jack Sprague	Griffin Racing	Chevrolet	198	121
15	24	88	Jerry Churchill	Churchill Racing	Ford	194	118
16	4	1	P. J. Jones	Vestar Motorsports	Chevrolet	191	115
17	17	24	Scott Lagasse	Hendrick Motorsports	Chevrolet	189	112
18	24	57	Bob Walker	Raul Flores Racing	Chevrolet	184	109
19	21	81	Jerry Glanville	Glanville Motorsports	Ford	180	106
20	22	51	Kerry Teague	Rosenblum Racing	Chevrolet	174	103
21	18	20	Walker Evans	Walker Evans Racing	Dodge	172	100
22	19	30	Mark Gibson	Grandaddy Racing	Dodge	137	97
23	14	14	John Kinder	Stroppe Motorsports	Ford	117	94
24	23	38	Sammy Swindell	Akins-Sutton Motorsports	Ford	117	91
