= NASCAR Craftsman Truck Series at Mesa Marin Raceway =

NASCAR Craftsman Truck Series race at Mesa Marin Raceway

NASCAR Truck Series at Mesa Marin

NASCAR Craftsman Truck Series
- Venue: Mesa Marin Raceway
- Location: Bakersfield, California, United States

Circuit information
- Surface: Asphalt
- Length: 0.805 mi (1.296 km)
- Turns: 4

Stock car racing events for the NASCAR Craftsman Truck Series were held at Mesa Marin Raceway, in Bakersfield, California during numerous seasons and times of year between 1994 and 2003.

== Ford Credit 125 ==
Ford Credit 125
NASCAR Craftsman Truck Series
- Venue: Mesa Marin Raceway
- Corporate sponsor: Ford Credit
- First race: 1995
- Last race: 1996
- Distance: 62.5 miles (100.6 km)
- Laps: 125

The Ford Credit 125 was a NASCAR Craftsman Truck Series stock car race held at Mesa Marin Raceway, in Bakersfield, California held during the 1995 season.

=== Past winners ===
Year	Date	Driver	Team	Manufacturer	Race Distance		Race Time	Average Speed (mph)	Report	Ref
Year	Date	Driver	Team	Manufacturer	Laps	Miles (km)	Race Time	Average Speed (mph)	Report	Ref
1995	April 22	Ron Hornaday Jr.	Dale Earnhardt Inc.	Chevrolet	125	100 (62.5)	0:52:45	71.09	Report	

== Lucas Oil 250 ==
Lucas Oil 250 presented by Glidden
NASCAR Craftsman Truck Series
- Venue: Mesa Marin Raceway
- Corporate sponsor: Lucas Oil
- First race: 1994
- Last race: 2003
- Distance: 125 miles (201.2 km)
- Laps: 250
- Previous names: Mesa Marin 200 (1994); Spears Manufacturing 200 (1995); Ford Dealers/Ford Credit 300 (1996); Dodge California Truck Stop 300 (1997–1999); Dodge California 250 (2000); OSH 250 (2001); Lucas Oil 250 presented by Glidden (2003)

The Lucas Oil 250 was a NASCAR Craftsman Truck Series stock car race held at Mesa Marin Raceway, in Bakersfield, California. One of the inaugural events of the series from its 1995 season, it was one of two races at the track in 1995, and then was the series' lone annual event at the track from 1996 to 2001, then after skipping the 2002 season was run once more in the spring of 2003, the series' final visit to the track. In addition, the track hosted the first series exhibition race in 1994, a 20-lap, 10 miles (16.1 km) event won by P. J. Jones. Points-paying events were 200 laps (100 miles (160.9 km)) in 1995, 300 laps (150 miles (241.4 km)) from 1996 to 1999, and 250 laps (125 miles (201.2 km)) from 2000 to 2003; the event changed from running in the fall to a spring race in 1999.

Mike Skinner and Dennis Setzer each won the event twice, the only drivers to win more than once; drivers who scored their first series wins at the track were Randy Tolsma in 1997, and Setzer in 1998.

=== Past winners ===
Year	Date	Driver	Team	Manufacturer	Race Distance		Race Time	Average Speed (mph)	Ref
Year	Date	Driver	Team	Manufacturer	Laps	Miles (km)	Race Time	Average Speed (mph)	Ref
Exhibition race
1994^{*}	July 30	P. J. Jones	Vestar Motorsports	Ford	20	10 (16.093)	0:07:02	81.818	
Official races
1995	October 15	Mike Skinner	Richard Childress Racing	Chevrolet	200	100 (160.934)	1:28:03	61.193	
1996	October 14	Mike Skinner	Richard Childress Racing	Chevrolet	300	150 (241.402)	2:16:48	65.789	
1997	October 12	Randy Tolsma	Xpress Motorsports	Chevrolet	300	150 (241.402)	1:57:58	76.293	
1998	October 18	Dennis Setzer	K-Automotive Motorsports	Dodge	300	150 (241.402)	2:10:29	68.974	
1999^{*}	April 10	Rick Carelli	Chesrown Racing	Chevrolet	301*	150.5 (242.206)	1:58:18	76.331	
2000	March 26	Mike Wallace	Ultra Motorsports	Ford	250	125 (201.168)	1:48:34	69.082	
2001	March 17	Ted Musgrave	Ultra Motorsports	Dodge	250	125 (201.168)	2:01:41	61.618	
2002	Not held								
2003^{*}	March 23	Dennis Setzer	Morgan-Dollar Motorsports	Chevrolet	255*	127.5 (205.191)	2:09:59	58.854	

- 1994: Exhibition race
- 1999 and 2003: Race extended due to a green–white–checker finish.

==== Multiple winners (drivers) ====
# Wins	Driver	Years won
2	Mike Skinner	1995, 1996
2	Dennis Setzer	1998, 2003

==== Multiple winners (teams) ====
# Wins	Team	Years won
2	Richard Childress Racing	1995-1996
2	Ultra Motorsports	2000-2001

==== Manufacturer wins ====
# Wins	Make	Years won
5	(United States) Chevrolet	1995–1997, 1999, 2003
2	(United States) Ford	1994, 2000
2	(United States) Dodge	1998, 2001
