= Bob Strait =

American racing driver (born 1949)

- Born: April 12, 1949 (age 77) Mokena, Illinois, U.S.

ARCA Racing Series career
- Debut season: 1986
- Current team: Hendren Motorsports
- Car number: 66
- Starts: 214
- Wins: 16
- Poles: 15
- Best finish: 2nd in 2000

NASCAR FedEx Freight Truck Series career
- 20 races run over 2 years
- Best finish: 11th (1995)
- First race: 1995 Skoal Bandit Copper World Classic (Phoenix)
- Last race: 1996 Florida Dodge Dealers 400 (Homestead)
Wins	Top tens	Poles
0	5	0
- Statistics up to date as of September 1, 2014.

Bob Strait (born April 12, 1949) is an American stock car racing driver. He was one of the pioneer NASCAR SuperTruck Series drivers. He has sixteen ARCA victories, with his first coming in 1986 at Cloverleaf Speedway, and his final coming in 2000 at Atlanta Motor Speedway.

== Motorsports career results ==
=== NASCAR ===
(key) (Bold – Pole position awarded by qualifying time. Italics – Pole position earned by points standings or practice time. * – Most laps led.)

==== Winston Cup Series ====
NASCAR Winston Cup Series results
Year	Team	No.	Make	1	2	3	4	5	6	7	8	9	10	11	12	13	14	15	16	17	18	19	20	21	22	23	24	25	26	27	28	29	30	31	32	33	34	NWCC	Pts	Ref
1995	Strait Racing	68	Ford	DAY; DNQ	CAR	RCH	ATL	DAR	BRI	NWS	MAR	TAL	SON	CLT	DOV	POC	MCH	DAY	NHA	POC	TAL	IND	GLN	MCH	BRI	DAR	RCH	DOV	MAR	NWS	CLT	CAR	PHO	ATL				NA	-	
1998	Mansion Motorsports	85	Chevy	DAY	CAR	LVS	ATL	DAR	BRI	TEX	MAR	TAL; DNQ	CAL	CLT	DOV	RCH	MCH	POC	SON	NHA	POC	IND	GLN	MCH	BRI	NHA	DAR	RCH	DOV	MAR	CLT	TAL	DAY	PHO	CAR	ATL		NA	-	
1999	Phoenix Air Racing	61	Ford	DAY	CAR	LVS	ATL	DAR	TEX	BRI	MAR	TAL	CAL	RCH	CLT	DOV	MCH	POC	SON	DAY	NHA	POC	IND; DNQ	GLN	MCH	BRI	DAR	RCH	NHA	DOV	MAR	CLT	TAL	CAR	PHO	HOM; DNQ	ATL	NA	-	

===== Daytona 500 =====
Year	Team	Manufacturer	Start	Finish
1995	Strait Racing	Ford	DNQ	

==== Craftsman Truck Series ====
NASCAR Craftsman Truck Series results
Year	Team	No.	Make	1	2	3	4	5	6	7	8	9	10	11	12	13	14	15	16	17	18	19	20	21	22	23	24	NCTC	Pts	Ref
1995	Jim Spicuzza	37	Ford	PHO; 15	TUS; 24	SGS; 10	MMR; 11	POR; 12	EVG; 11	I70; 9	LVL; 8	BRI; 7	MLW; 11	CNS; 22	HPT; 24	IRP; 9	FLM; 11	RCH; 21	MAR; 28	NWS; 32			PHO; 21					11th	2182	
1995	Ultra Motorsports	12	Ford																		SON; 23	MMR						11th	2182	
1996	Jim Spicuzza	37	Ford	HOM; 31	PHO	POR	EVG	TUS	CNS	HPT	BRI	NZH	MLW	LVL	I70	IRP	FLM	GLN	NSV	RCH	NHA	MAR	NWS	SON	MMR	PHO	LVS	96th	128	

=== ARCA Racing Series ===
(key) (Bold – Pole position awarded by qualifying time. Italics – Pole position earned by points standings or practice time. * – Most laps led.)

ARCA Racing Series results
Year	Team	No.	Make	1	2	3	4	5	6	7	8	9	10	11	12	13	14	15	16	17	18	19	20	21	22	23	24	25	ARSC	Pts	Ref
1986	Roulo Brothers Racing	80	Chevy	ATL	DAY	ATL	TAL	SIR; 26	SSP; 2	FRS; 5	KIL; 3	CSP; 1	TAL	BLN; 3	ISF; 3	DSF; 27	TOL; 24	MCS; 25	ATL; 35										13th	1395	
1987	Roulo Brothers Racing	80	Chevy	DAY	ATL	TAL	DEL; 17	ACS; 4	TOL; 16	ROC; 2	POC	FRS; 4	**KIL**; 1	TAL	FRS; 6	ISF; 2	INF; 2	DSF; 6	SLM; 6	ATL									11th	2080	
1988	Roulo Brothers Racing	80	Chevy	DAY	ATL	TAL	FRS; 6	PCS; 20	ROC; 2	POC	**WIN**; 6	KIL; 4	ACS; 5	SLM; 22	POC	TAL	DEL; 5	FRS; 2	ISF; 4	DSF; 3	SLM; 3	ATL							10th	2245	
1989	Roulo Brothers Racing	26	Chevy	DAY	ATL	KIL; 1*	TAL	FRS; 8	POC	KIL; 1	HAG	POC	TAL	DEL; 2	FRS; 5	ISF; 2	**TOL**; 1	DSF; 2	**SLM**; 23	ATL									11th	2275	
1990	Roulo Brothers Racing	26	Chevy	DAY; 10	ATL	KIL; 20	TAL	FRS; 4	POC	**KIL**; 3*	TOL; 1*	HAG; 2	POC	TAL	MCH; 30	ISF; 16	**TOL**; 14	DSF; 20	WIN; 4	DEL; 1*	ATL								8th	2590	
1991	Roulo Brothers Racing	26	Chevy	DAY	ATL	**KIL**; 23*	TAL	**TOL**; 2	FRS; 2	POC	MCH	KIL; 1*	FRS; 10	DEL; 2	POC	TAL	HPT; 3	MCH	ISF; 3	TOL; 5	DSF; 1	TWS	ATL						11th	2365	
1992	Strait Racing	97	Olds	DAY; 24																									13th	2495	
1992	Strait Racing	80	Olds		FIF; 22	TWS	TAL	**TOL**; 1*	KIL; 25	POC		FRS; 20	KIL; 16	NSH; 15	DEL	POC	HPT; 3	FRS; 4	ISF; 3	TOL	DSF; 4	TWS	SLM; 1	ATL					13th	2495	
1992	Strait Racing	24	Olds								MCH; 14																		13th	2495	
1993	Jim Spicuzza	37	Olds	DAY	FIF; 5				CMS; 23																				7th	4155	
1993	Jim Spicuzza	7	Ford			TWS; 27																							7th	4155	
1993	Jim Spicuzza	37	Ford				TAL; 19	KIL; 15*		FRS; 3	TOL; 2	POC; 33	MCH; 14	FRS; 2	POC; 4	KIL; 1	ISF; 30	DSF; 2	TOL; 26	**SLM**; 1	WIN; 5	ATL; 10							7th	4155	
1994	Jim Spicuzza	37	Ford	DAY; 6	TAL; 23	FIF; 13	LVL; 17	KIL; 3*	TOL; 17	FRS; 7	MCH; 23	DMS; 21	POC; 8	POC; 33	KIL; 2*	FRS; 13	INF; 25	I70; 3*	ISF	DSF	TOL	SLM	WIN	ATL					10th	3345	
1995	Ken Schrader Racing	52	Chevy	DAY	ATL	TAL	FIF	KIL	FRS	MCH	I80	MCS	FRS	POC	POC	KIL	FRS	SBS	LVL	ISF	DSF	SLM; 24	WIN	ATL					NA	0	
1997	Bowsher Motorsports	21	Ford	DAY; 11	ATL; 7	**SLM**; 2	CLT; 16	CLT; 12	POC; 18	MCH; 9	SBS; 19*	TOL; 3	**KIL**; 13	FRS; 2	MIN; 6	POC; 26	MCH; 32	DSF; 3	GTW; 4	SLM; 3	WIN; 23	CLT; 7	TAL; 23	ISF; 7	ATL; 31				5th	4935	
1998	Bowsher Motorsports	21	Ford	DAY; 7	ATL; 7	**SLM**; 24	CLT; 17	MEM; 4	MCH; 13	POC; 6	SBS; 3	TOL; 4	PPR; 10	POC; 21	KIL; 3	FRS; 2	ISF; 12	ATL; 12	DSF; 30	SLM; 7	TEX; 6	**WIN**; 1	CLT; 21	TAL; 17	ATL; 31				3rd	5245	
1999	Bowsher Motorsports	21	Ford	DAY; 22	ATL; 7	SLM; 2	AND; 5	CLT; 21																					17th	2265	
1999	Mark Gibson Racing	55	Ford						MCH; 3	POC; 23																			17th	2265	
1999		30	Ford								TOL; 22	SBS	BLN	POC	KIL	FRS	FLM												17th	2265	
1999	Hendren Motorsports	27	Chevy															**ISF**; 23	WIN	DSF; 5	SLM; 25	CLT							17th	2265	
1999	Phoenix Air Racing	66	Ford																				**TAL**; 1*	ATL					17th	2265	
2000	Phoenix Air Racing	66	Ford	DAY; 3			CLT; 5			MCH; 5	POC; 10		KEN; 2		POC; 28			KEN; 7			CLT; 2	TAL; 33	ATL; 1						2nd	4720	
2000	Phoenix Air Racing	66	Chevy		SLM; 12	AND; 5		KIL; 10	FRS; 9			TOL; 10		BLN; 13		WIN; 15	ISF; 4		DSF; 15	SLM; 5									2nd	4720	
2001	Phoenix Air Racing	66	Ford	DAY; 2	NSH	WIN	SLM	GTY	KEN	CLT	KAN	MCH	POC	MEM	GLN	KEN	MCH	POC	NSH		CHI; 20						TAL; 2	ATL	40th	910	
2001	Phoenix Air Racing	66	Chevy																	ISF; 2		DSF; 24	SLM	TOL	BLN	CLT			40th	910	
2002	Hendren Motorsports	66	Chevy	DAY	ATL	NSH	SLM	KEN	CLT	KAN	POC	MCH	TOL	SBO	KEN	BLN	POC	NSH	ISF; 3	WIN	DSF; 27								42nd	640	
2002	Hendren Motorsports	66	Ford																			CHI; 21	SLM	TAL	CLT; 5				42nd	640	
2003	Hendren Motorsports	66	Pontiac	DAY; 2														ISF; 22*	WIN	DSF; 26									25th	1080	
2003	Hendren Motorsports	66	Ford		ATL; 38	NSH	SLM	TOL	KEN; Wth	CLT	BLN	KAN; 7	MCH	LER	POC	POC	NSH				CHI; 3	SLM	TAL	CLT; 15	SBO				25th	1080	
2005	Hendren Motorsports	4	Ford	DAY	NSH	SLM	KEN	TOL	LAN	MIL	POC	MCH	KAN	KEN	BLN	POC	GTW	LER	NSH	MCH	ISF; 24	TOL	DSF; 2	CHI	SLM	TAL			86th	345	
2006	Hendren Motorsports	4	Ford	DAY	NSH	SLM	WIN	KEN	TOL	POC	MCH	KAN	KEN	BLN	POC	GTW	NSH	MCH	ISF; 4*	MIL	TOL	DSF; 4							60th	590	
2006	Hendren Motorsports	66	Chevy																				CHI; 14	SLM	TAL	IOW			60th	590	
2007	Hendren Motorsports	66	Chevy	DAY	USA	NSH	SLM	KAN	WIN	KEN	TOL	IOW	POC	MCH	BLN	KEN	POC	NSH	ISF	MIL	GTW	DSF	CHI	SLM	TAL	TOL; 12			122nd	170	
2008	Hendren Motorsports	66	Ford	DAY	SLM	IOW	KAN	CAR	KEN	TOL	POC	MCH	CAY	KEN	BLN	POC	NSH	ISF; 31	DSF; 25	CHI	SLM	NJE	TAL	TOL					102nd	180	
2012	Bowsher Motorsports	21	Ford	DAY	MOB	SLM	TAL	TOL	ELK	POC	MCH	WIN	NJE	IOW	CHI	IRP	POC	BLN	ISF	MAD	SLM; 33	DSF	KAN						142nd	65	
2014	Hendren Motorsports	66	Chevy	DAY	MOB	SLM	TAL	TOL	NJE	POC	MCH	ELK	WIN	CHI	IRP	POC	BLN	ISF; 28	MAD	DSF; 19	SLM	KEN	KAN						71st	225	
