= Andy Hillenburg =

American racing driver (born 1963)

- Born: Andrew Miles Hillenburg; April 30, 1963 (age 63); Indianapolis, Indiana, U.S.
- Achievements: 1995 ARCA Racing Series Champion

NASCAR Cup Series career
- 16 races run over 7 years
- Best finish: 54th (1998)
- First race: 1991 Goodwrench 500 (Rockingham)
- Last race: 2004 Advance Auto Parts 500 (Martinsville)
Wins	Top tens	Poles
0	0	0

NASCAR O'Reilly Auto Parts Series career
- 9 races run over 7 years
- Best finish: 76th (1996)
- First race: 1992 AC-Delco 200 (Rockingham)
- Last race: 2001 Jani-King 300 (Texas)
Wins	Top tens	Poles
0	1	0

NASCAR FedEx Freight Truck Series career
- 4 races run over 3 years
- Best finish: 79th (1996)
- First race: 1995 GM Goodwrench/Delco Battery 200 (Phoenix)
- Last race: 2003 Florida Dodge Dealers 250 (Daytona)
Wins	Top tens	Poles
0	0	0
- Retired: 2006

ARCA Menards Series
- Years active: 1992–2006
- Starts: 61
- Wins: 3
- Poles: 1
- Best finish: 1st in 1995

Previous series
- 2001 2000 1994: Winston West Series; Indy Racing Northern Light Series; Busch North Series
- Statistics up to date as of November 23, 2012.

Andrew Miles Hillenburg (born April 30, 1963) is an American former professional stock car racing driver and current team owner and track owner. His race team, Fast Track Racing, fields multiple cars in the ARCA Menards Series and formerly fielded entries in the NASCAR Cup Series and NASCAR Camping World Truck Series. He is credited with reviving the North Carolina Speedway, now known as Rockingham Speedway, after the track lost its NASCAR dates starting in 2005.

== Racing career ==
Hillenburg was born in Indianapolis, Indiana. He began his racing career at age eleven when he competed in the Indianapolis soap box derby.

Hillenburg won the state quarter midget championships in 1975–1979. Hillenburg won the ARCA Super Car Series Championship in 1995, with three time ARCA Champion Bob Dotter as crew chief. He won the 1995 and 1997 Daytona ARCA 200, the premiere event in the series.

Hillenburg served as a test driver for the International Race of Champions and Team Racing Auto Circuit series. He competed in the 2000 Indianapolis 500, finishing 28th, and has sixteen Winston Cup starts nine Busch Series starts and four in the Craftsman Truck Series. His best finish in NASCAR was a third-place finish at the 1999 NAPA Auto Parts 300, where he drove the No. 18 MBNA Pontiac Grand Prix for Joe Gibbs Racing.

== Team owner ==
Hillenburg operates the Fast Track High Performance Driving School and owns a team that competes ARCA Menards Series, Fast Track High Performance Racing (usually just known as Fast Track Racing or Fast Track Racing Enterprises). They currently field multiple entries with the Nos. 01, 9, 10, 11, and 12 cars.

Fast Track also formerly fielded entries in NASCAR's top three series. Most notably, they fielded the No. 47 and 48 teams in the NASCAR Truck Series between 2007 and 2010. He previously had fielded a No. 10 truck in two races in 2003 NASCAR Craftsman Truck Series.

In the NASCAR Busch Series (now Xfinity), Hillenburg entered one race in both 1992 and 1993 in his car, the No. 42, before running a part-time schedule of six races in 1994, although he only qualified for one of those six races. His team did not return until 1997, where he entered his own No. 25 car at Dover. This was his last attempt as a car owner in that series.

Besides two races in 1992, Fast Track's only Cup Series attempt came in the 2007 Daytona 500, with them entering the No. 71 Ford driven by Frank Kimmel in the 2007 Daytona 500, but the entry did not make the field.

== Track owner ==
On October 2, 2007, Hillenburg purchased North Carolina Speedway in Rockingham, North Carolina for $4.4 million (USD). The track was put up for auction by Speedway Motorsports Inc. and chairman Bruton Smith. Rockingham had not hosted a NASCAR event since 2004, but Hillenburg hopes to bring lower-tier NASCAR series back to the track. On May 4, 2008, the ARCA RE/MAX Series raced at Rockingham in the Carolina 500 and again in 2009. Also in 2008, the USAR Hooters Procup Series had their final race of the season at the Rockingham Speedway, in a race called the American 200 (named in honor of the name for the first race run at the Rock in 1965, the American 500) on November 1, 2008. The track hosted its first NASCAR sanctioned race (a Camping World Truck Series race) since its 2004 closure on April 15, 2012. Rockingham became part of the regular schedule for that series, and they returned in 2013. However, Rockingham was removed from the series' 2014 schedule.

== Acting ==
Hillenburg has also acted in a few movies, including 3: The Dale Earnhardt Story on ESPN, Herbie: Fully Loaded, and Talladega Nights: The Ballad of Ricky Bobby.

Hillenburg also was a technical advisor and provided equipment for the filming of the Bollywood film Ta Ra Rum Pum, which was filmed at Rockingham and also at the ARCA race at the Milwaukee Mile.

== Personal life ==
Hillenburg has been married since 1991 and is the father of four children.

== Motorsports career results ==
=== NASCAR ===
(key) (Bold – Pole position awarded by qualifying time. Italics – Pole position earned by points standings or practice time. * – Most laps led.)

==== Nextel Cup Series ====
NASCAR Nextel Cup Series results
Year	Team	No.	Make	1	2	3	4	5	6	7	8	9	10	11	12	13	14	15	16	17	18	19	20	21	22	23	24	25	26	27	28	29	30	31	32	33	34	35	36	NNCC	Pts	Ref
1991	Andy Hillenburg Racing	29	Buick	DAY	RCH	CAR; 40	ATL; 32	DAR	BRI	NWS	MAR	TAL	CLT	DOV	SON	POC	MCH	DAY	POC	TAL	GLN	MCH	BRI	DAR	RCH	DOV	MAR	NWS	CLT	CAR	PHO	ATL								64th	110	
1993	Diamond Ridge Motorsports	29	Chevy	DAY	CAR	RCH	ATL	DAR	BRI	NWS	MAR	TAL	SON	CLT	DOV	POC	MCH	DAY	NHA	POC	TAL	GLN	MCH	BRI	DAR	RCH	DOV	MAR	NWS	CLT; 41	CAR	PHO	ATL							91st	40	
1995	Dick Brooks Racing	40	Pontiac	DAY	CAR	RCH	ATL	DAR	BRI	NWS	MAR	TAL	SON	CLT	DOV	POC	MCH	DAY; 36	NHA	POC	TAL	IND	GLN	MCH	BRI	DAR	RCH	DOV	MAR	NWS	CLT	CAR	PHO	ATL						65th	55	
1998	Sadler Brothers Racing	95	Chevy	DAY; 29	CAR	LVS	ATL; DNQ	DAR	BRI	TEX; DNQ	MAR	TAL	CAL	CLT; DNQ	DOV	RCH	MCH	POC	SON																					54th	334	
1998	LJ Racing	91	Chevy																	NHA; 31	POC	IND	GLN	MCH	BRI	NHA	DAR	RCH	DOV	MAR		TAL; 22	DAY; 24	PHO						54th	334	
1998	Hover Motorsports	80	Ford																												CLT; DNQ				CAR; DNQ	ATL; DNQ				54th	334	
1999	Hover Motorsports	80	Ford	DAY; DNQ	CAR	LVS	ATL	DAR	TEX	BRI	MAR	TAL	CAL	RCH	CLT	DOV	MCH	POC	SON	DAY	NHA	POC	IND	GLN	MCH	BRI	DAR	RCH	NHA	DOV	MAR									68th	34	
1999	LJ Racing	91	Chevy																													CLT; DNQ	TAL; 43	CAR	PHO	HOM	ATL			68th	34	
2000	LJ Racing	91	Chevy	DAY; DNQ	CAR	LVS	ATL	DAR	BRI	TEX	MAR	TAL	CAL	RCH	CLT	DOV	MCH	POC	SON	DAY	NHA	POC	IND	GLN	MCH	BRI	DAR	RCH	NHA	DOV	MAR	CLT	TAL	CAR	PHO	HOM	ATL			NA	-	
2001	BAM Racing	49	Pontiac	DAY	CAR	LVS	ATL	DAR	BRI	TEX	MAR	TAL; DNQ	CAL	RCH	CLT	DOV	MCH	POC	SON	DAY; DNQ	CHI	NHA	POC; DNQ	IND; DNQ	GLN	MCH	BRI	DAR	RCH	DOV	KAN	CLT	MAR	TAL	PHO	CAR	HOM	ATL	NHA	NA	-	
2002	Marcis Auto Racing	71	Chevy	DAY	CAR	LVS	ATL	DAR; 43	BRI	TEX	MAR; 43	TAL	CAL	RCH	CLT	DOV	POC	MCH	SON	DAY	CHI	NHA	POC	IND	GLN	MCH	BRI	DAR	RCH	NHA	DOV	KAN	TAL	CLT	MAR	ATL	CAR	PHO	HOM	75th	68	
2004	Donlavey Racing	90	Ford	DAY; DNQ																																				65th	206	
2004	Hover Motorsports	80	Ford		CAR; 34	LVS	ATL; 42	DAR; 42	BRI; 43	TEX; DNQ	MAR; 42	TAL	CAL	RCH	CLT; DNQ	DOV	POC; DNQ	MCH	SON	DAY	CHI	NHA																		65th	206	
2004	R&J Racing	37	Dodge																				POC; DNQ	IND; DNQ	GLN	MCH	BRI	CAL	RCH	NHA	DOV	TAL	KAN	CLT	MAR	ATL	PHO	DAR	HOM	65th	206	

===== Daytona 500 =====
Year	Team	Manufacturer	Start	Finish
1998	Sadler Brothers Racing	Ford	18	29
1999	Hover Motorsports	Ford	DNQ	
2000	LJ Racing	Chevrolet	DNQ	
2004	Donlavey Racing	Ford	DNQ	

==== Busch Series ====
NASCAR Busch Series results
Year	Team	No.	Make	1	2	3	4	5	6	7	8	9	10	11	12	13	14	15	16	17	18	19	20	21	22	23	24	25	26	27	28	29	30	31	32	33	NBSC	Pts	Ref
1992	Andy Hillenburg Racing	42	Chevy	DAY	CAR	RCH	ATL	MAR	DAR	BRI	HCY	LAN	DUB	NZH	CLT	DOV	ROU	MYB	GLN	VOL	NHA	TAL	IRP	ROU	MCH	NHA	BRI	DAR	RCH	DOV	CLT	MAR	CAR; 24	HCY			106th	91	
1993	Andy Hillenburg Racing	42	Chevy	DAY	CAR; 22	RCH	DAR	BRI	HCY	ROU	MAR	NZH	CLT	DOV	MYB	GLN	MLW	TAL	IRP	MCH	NHA	BRI	DAR	RCH	DOV	ROU	CLT	MAR	CAR	HCY	ATL						95th	97	
1994	Andy Hillenburg Racing	42	Chevy	DAY; 21	CAR	RCH	ATL; DNQ	MAR; DNQ	DAR	HCY; DNQ	BRI	ROU; DNQ	NHA	NZH	CLT	DOV	MYB	GLN	MLW	SBO	TAL	HCY; DNQ	IRP	MCH	BRI	DAR	RCH	DOV	CLT	MAR	CAR						83rd	100	
1996	Ken Schrader Racing	52	Chevy	DAY; 43	CAR; 23	RCH	ATL; DNQ	NSV	DAR	BRI	HCY	NZH	CLT	DOV	SBO	MYB	GLN	MLW	NHA	TAL	IRP	MCH	BRI	DAR	RCH	DOV	CLT	CAR	HOM								76th	128	
1997	Labonte Motorsports	5	Chevy	DAY; 20	CAR	RCH	ATL	LVS	DAR	HCY	TEX	BRI	NSV	TAL	NHA	NZH	CLT																				80th	164	
1997	Fast Track Racing Enterprises	25	Chevy															DOV; 34	SBO	GLN	MLW	MYB	GTY	IRP	MCH	BRI	DAR	RCH	DOV	CLT	CAL	CAR	HOM				80th	164	
1999	Joe Gibbs Racing	18	Pontiac	DAY; 3	CAR	LVS	ATL	DAR	TEX	NSV	BRI	TAL	CAL	NHA	RCH	NZH	CLT	DOV	SBO	GLN	MLW	MYB	PPR	GTY	IRP	MCH	BRI	DAR	RCH	DOV	CLT	CAR	MEM	PHO	HOM		88th	165	
2001	BAM Racing	22	Chevy	DAY	CAR	LVS	ATL	DAR	BRI	TEX; 33	NSH	TAL	CAL	RCH	NHA	NZH	CLT	DOV	KEN	MLW	GLN	CHI	GTY	PPR	IRP	MCH	BRI	DAR	RCH	DOV	KAN	CLT	MEM	PHO	CAR	HOM	120th	64	

==== Craftsman Truck Series ====
NASCAR Craftsman Truck Series results
Year	Team	No.	Make	1	2	3	4	5	6	7	8	9	10	11	12	13	14	15	16	17	18	19	20	21	22	23	24	25	NCTC	Pts	Ref
1995	Vestar Motorsports	01	Chevy	PHO	TUS	SGS	MMR	POR	EVG	I70	LVL	BRI	MLW	CNS	HPT	IRP	FLM	RCH	MAR	NWS	SON	MMR	PHO; 33						101st	64	
1996	Vestar Motorsports	1	Chevy	HOM	PHO	POR	EVG	TUS	CNS	HPT	BRI	NZH	MLW	LVL	I70	IRP	FLM	GLN	NSV; 14	RCH; 36	NHA	MAR	NWS	SON	MMR	PHO	LVS		79th	176	
1999	Fast Track Racing Enterprises	48	Chevy	HOM	PHO	EVG	MMR	MAR	MEM	PPR	I70	BRI	TEX	PIR	GLN	MLW	NSV	NZH	MCH	NHA	IRP; DNQ	GTY	HPT	RCH	LVS	LVL	TEX	CAL	116th	58	
2003	Fast Track Racing Enterprises	10	Dodge	DAY; 15	DAR	MMR	MAR	CLT	DOV	TEX	MEM	MLW	KAN																97th	118	
2003	Gary Keller Racing	10	Ford											KEN; DNQ	GTW	MCH	IRP	NSH	BRI	RCH	NHA	CAL	LVS	SBO	TEX	MAR	PHO	HOM	97th	118	

=== ARCA Re/Max Series ===
(key) (Bold – Pole position awarded by qualifying time. Italics – Pole position earned by points standings or practice time. * – Most laps led.)

ARCA Re/Max Series results
Year	Team	No.	Make	1	2	3	4	5	6	7	8	9	10	11	12	13	14	15	16	17	18	19	20	21	22	23	24	25	ARMC	Pts	Ref
1992	Ken Schrader Racing	58	Chevy	DAY; 10	FIF	TWS	TAL; 8	TOL	KIL	POC	MCH	FRS	KIL	NSH	DEL	POC	HPT	FRS	ISF	TOL	DSF	TWS	SLM	ATL					93rd	-	
1993	Robert Ingraham	38	Chevy	DAY; 9	FIF	TWS	TAL	KIL	CMS	FRS	TOL	POC	MCH	FRS	POC	KIL	ISF	DSF	TOL	SLM	WIN	ATL							120th	-	
1995	Ken Schrader Racing	52	Chevy	DAY; 1																									1st	5485	
1995	Fast Track Racing Enterprises	11	Chevy		ATL; 5	TAL; 6			FRS; 1	MCH; 6	I80; 5	MCS; 18	FRS; 11	POC; 10	POC; 5		FRS; 6	SBS; 5	LVL; 9	ISF; 15	DSF; 7	SLM; 17		ATL; 5					1st	5485	
1995	Fast Track Racing Enterprises	11	Olds				FIF; 6	KIL; 3								KIL; 5							WIN; 8						1st	5485	
1996	Ken Schrader Racing	52	Chevy	DAY; 4	ATL; 22	SLM	TAL; 3	FIF	LVL	CLT; 3	CLT; 2	KIL	FRS	POC	MCH; 30	FRS	TOL	POC	MCH	INF	SBS	ISF	DSF	KIL	SLM	WIN	CLT	ATL	41st	-	
1997	Phoenix Racing	1	Chevy	**DAY**; 1*	ATL	SLM																							38th	-	
1997	Fast Track Racing Enterprises	11	Chevy				CLT; 15	CLT	POC	MCH	SBS	TOL	KIL	FRS	MIN														38th	-	
1997	Hover Motorsports	80	Ford													POC; 7	MCH	DSF	GTW	SLM	WIN	CLT; 13	TAL; 33	ISF	ATL; 3				38th	-	
1998	Sadler Brothers Racing	95	Chevy	DAY; 3																									NA	0	
1998	Hover Motorsports	80	Ford		ATL; 8	SLM	CLT; 14	MEM	MCH; 2	POC; 8	SBS	TOL	PPR	POC; 29	KIL	FRS	ISF						CLT; 10	TAL; 9	ATL				NA	0	
1998	Hover Motorsports	80	Chevy															ATL; 32	DSF	SLM	TEX	WIN							NA	0	
1999	Hover Motorsports	80	Ford	DAY; 35	ATL																								41st	765	
1999	ML Motorsports	67	Chevy			SLM; 8	AND; 26	CLT; 39	MCH	POC	TOL	SBS	BLN	POC	KIL	FRS	FLM	ISF	WIN	DSF	SLM								41st	765	
1999	Roulo Brothers Racing	39	Chevy																			CLT; 24	TAL; 6	ATL; 31					41st	765	
2000	Roulo Brothers Racing	39	Chevy	DAY; 6	SLM	AND	CLT	KIL	FRS	MCH	POC	TOL	KEN	BLN	POC	WIN	ISF	KEN	DSF	SLM	CLT	TAL							67th	325	
2000	BAM Racing	11	Pontiac																				ATL; 21						67th	325	
2001	Roulo Brothers Racing	39	Chevy	DAY; 17	NSH	WIN	SLM	GTY	KEN	CLT	KAN	MCH	POC	MEM	GLN	KEN	MCH	POC	NSH	ISF	CHI	DSF	SLM	TOL	BLN	CLT	TAL	ATL	140th	145	
2002	Fast Track Racing Enterprises	11	Chevy	DAY; 6																									87th	340	
2002	Fast Track Racing Enterprises	11	Ford		ATL; 18	NSH	SLM	KEN	CLT	KAN	POC	MCH	TOL	SBO	KEN	BLN	POC	NSH	ISF	WIN	DSF	CHI	SLM	TAL	CLT				87th	340	
2003	Hover Motorsports	80	Ford	DAY; 8	ATL; 29	NSH	SLM	TOL	KEN	CLT	BLN	KAN	MCH	LER	POC	POC	NSH	ISF	WIN	DSF	CHI	SLM	TAL	CLT	SBO				95th	275	
2004	Fast Track Racing Enterprises	10	Chevy	DAY; 36	NSH	SLM	KEN	TOL	CLT	KAN	POC	MCH	SBO	BLN	KEN	GTW	POC	LER	NSH	ISF	TOL	DSF	CHI	SLM	TAL				182nd	50	
2006	Fast Track Racing Enterprises	11	Chevy	DAY	NSH	SLM	WIN	KEN	TOL	POC	MCH	KAN	KEN	BLN	POC	GTW	NSH	MCH	ISF	MIL; 28	TOL	DSF	CHI	SLM	TAL	IOW			149th	90	

=== IRL IndyCar Series ===
Year	Team	Chassis	No.	Engine	1	2	3	4	5	6	7	8	9	Rank	Points	Ref
2000	Hillenburg Racing	Dallara	48	Oldsmobile	WDW	PHX	LSV	INDY; 28	TEX	PIK	ATL	KTY	TEX	48th	2	

=== Indianapolis 500 results ===
Year	Chassis	Engine	Start	Finish	Note	Team
2000	Dallara	Aurora	33rd	28th	Wheel Bearing	Fast Track

Sporting positions
Preceded by Bobby Bowsher	ARCA Bondo/Mar-Hyde Series Champion; 1995	Succeeded by Tim Steele
