= ARCA races at Toledo =

Combination ARCA Menards Series and ARCA Menards Series East race in Toledo, Ohio

Owens Corning 200
ARCA Menards Series ARCA Menards Series East
- Venue: Toledo Speedway (since 1963); Toledo Raceway Park (1953–1961)
- Location: Toledo, Ohio; United States
- Corporate sponsor: Owens Corning
- First race: 1953
- Distance: 100 miles (160.934 km)
- Laps: 200
- Previous names: Toledo ARCA 125 (1985-1987, 1990-1992); Toledo ARCA 150 (1993-1994, 1997-1998); Auto Value Parts Stores 150 (1996); Jasper Engines & Transmissions 150 (1999-2000); Jasper Engines & Transmissions 200 (2001-2002); GFS Marketplace 200 by Federated Car Care (2003); Hickory Farms 200 by Federated Car Care (2004); Hantz Group 200 by Federated Car Care (2005-2008); Menards 200 Presented by Federated Car Care (2009-2018); Sioux Chief PowerPEX 200 (2019) --- Former second races Snap-On Tools ARCA 125 (1989-1991); Pedigree Food for Dogs 125 (1992); Toledo 125 (1993); Winnebago 150 (1994); Hantz Group 200 by Belle Tire (2004-2008); ARCA Re/Max 200 by Federated & Belle Tire (2009); Northwest Ohio Ford Dealers 200 (2010); Federated Car Care 200 (2011)

Circuit information
- Surface: Asphalt
- Length: 0.804 km (0.500 mi)
- Turns: 4

The Automobile Racing Club of America (ARCA) has hosted stock car racing events for the ARCA Menards Series and ARCA Menards Series East in Toledo, Ohio during numerous seasons and times of the year since 1953. Races were held at Toledo Raceway Park from 1953 through 1962, and at Toledo Speedway since 1963. The race is currently known as the Owens Corning 200.

== History ==
In its first year of operations in 1953, ARCA, then known as the Midwest Automobile Racing Club (MARC), debuted at the 0.5 mi (0.80 km) Toledo Raceway Park, with Jim Romine winning the inaugural race. Over the first ten years of the MARC Racing Series (excluding 1959), several races were held at the track per season, with as many as six in 1956. MARC's events in Toledo, Ohio were moved to the half-mile Toledo Speedway in 1963. Numerous events were held under the renamed ARCA's sanctioning until it was taken off the series' schedule from 1978 to 1983, after which it was removed once more in 1988. From 1990 to 1994 and 2004 to 2011, two ARCA races were held annually at the track, one in the springtime and the other in the fall. After a brief absence from the track in 1995, only one race was included on the calendar in 1996–2003. Since 2012, ARCA has only hosted one annual race at Toledo, apart from 2020 when three races were held at the track because a Toledo doubleheader replaced races at the Mid-Ohio Sports Car Course and Elko Speedway due to the COVID-19 pandemic.

== ARCA Menards Series ==
=== Past winners ===
Year	Date	No.	Driver	Team	Manufacturer	Race distance		Race time	Average speed (mph)	Report
Year	Date	No.	Driver	Team	Manufacturer	Laps	Miles (km)	Race time	Average speed (mph)	Report
1953	July 4		Jim Romine							
1953	August 15		Iggy Katona							
1953	August 16		Jim Romine (2)							
1953	August 16		Jim Romine (3)							
1954	July 31		Russ Hepler							
1954	September 11		Russ Hepler							
1955	June 4		Ernie Derr							
1955	July 10		Bill Rexford							
1955	August 27		Iggy Katona (2)							
1955	September 24		Iggy Katona (3)							
1956	May 29		Iggy Katona (4)							
1956	May 29		Russ Hepler							
1956	July 4		Jack Farris							
1956	July 28		Iggy Katona (5)							
1956	September 2		Kenny Wheeler							
1956	September 23		Paul Wensink							
1957	April 28		Heshel White							
1957	May 26		Nelson Stacy							
1957	July 6		Jack Shanklin							
1957	August 10		Bob James							
1958	October 13, 1957 (Note: The race was in 1957; however, it was part of the 1958 season.)		Red Duvall							
1958	May 24		George Henderson							
1958	July 26		Bob James (2)							
1959	Not held									
1960	July 9		Don White							
1960	August 6		Don White (2)							
1961	September 4		Harold Smith							
1962	May 6		Dick Freeman							
1962	August 4		Paul Parks							
1963	April 21		Iggy Katona (6)							
1964	May 3		Jim Cushman							
1965	May 23		Jack Bowsher							
1965	July 5		Jack Bowsher (2)							
1966	May 1		Iggy Katona (7)							
1966	July 4		Les Snow							
1966	September 5		Les Snow (2)							
1967	April 30		Iggy Katona (8)							
1967	September 4		Andy Hampton							
1968	May 5		Benny Parsons							
1968	July 20		Benny Parsons (2)							
1969	August 2		Benny Parsons (3)							
1970	April 26		Bobby Watson							
1970	August 7		Tom Bowsher							
1970	September 7		Tom Bowsher (2)							
1971	April 25		Tom Bowsher (3)							
1971	July 4		Tom Bowsher (4)							
1971	September 5		Ramo Stott							
1972	July 2		Ron Hutcherson							
1972	August 18		Joy Fair							
1973	May 6		Bruce Gould							
1973	July 1		Bruce Gould (2)							
1973	July 28		Bruce Gould (3)							
1974	September 1		Bruce Gould (4)							
1975	June 28		Dave Dayton (Note: Dave Dayton was relieved by John Anderson who won the race but since Dayton started the race, he is credited with the win.)							
1975	August 31		Woody Fisher							
1976	June 27		Dave Dayton (2)							
1976	August 29		Dave Dayton (3)							
1977	October 10, 1976 (Note: The race was in 1976; however, it was part of the 1977 season.)		Larry LaMay							
1977	June 26		Moose Myers							
1977	September 11		Moose Myers (2)							
1978 – 1983	Not held									
1984	September 15		Howard Rose							Report
1985	September 15	20	Ed Hage	Judy Hage	Oldsmobile	125	62.5 mi (100.584 km)	N/A	71.383	Report
1986	September 7	0	Scott Stovall	Jim Stovall	Chevrolet	125	62.5 mi (100.584 km)	N/A	N/A	Report
1987	May 31	25	Bill Venturini	Venturini Motorsports	Chevrolet	125	62.5 mi (100.584 km)	N/A	N/A	Report
1988	Not held									
1989	August 27	26	Bob Strait	Roulo Brothers Racing	Chevrolet	125	62.5 mi (100.584 km)	N/A	N/A	Report
1990	July 1	26	Bob Strait (2)	Roulo Brothers Racing (2)	Chevrolet	125	62.5 mi (100.584 km)	0:48:11	N/A	Report
1990	August 26	29	Bob Keselowski	K-Automotive Motorsports	Pontiac	125	62.5 mi (100.584 km)	N/A	N/A	Report
1991	May 26	21	Bobby Bowsher	Jack Bowsher	Pontiac	148*	74.0 mi (119.091 km)	N/A	N/A	Report
1991	August 25	21	Bobby Bowsher (2)	Jack Bowsher (2)	Pontiac	125	62.5 mi (100.584 km)	0:48:25	77.506	Report
1992	May 24	80	Bob Strait (3)	Strait Racing	Oldsmobile	125	62.5 mi (100.584 km)	0:54:56	68.265	Report
1992	August 30	21	Bobby Bowsher (3)	Jack Bowsher (3)	Ford	130	65.0 mi (104.607 km)	0:47:41	81.79	Report
1993	May 30	21	Bobby Bowsher (4)	Jack Bowsher (4)	Ford	129*	64.5 mi (103.802 km)	0:57:45	67.013	Report
1993	September 12	39	Dave Weltmeyer	Roulo Brothers Racing (3)	Chevrolet	152*	76.0 mi (122.310 km)	0:53:42	84.916	Report
1994	May 22	02	Frank Kimmel	Shirley Racing	Oldsmobile	152*	76.0 mi (122.310 km)	1:05:58	69.126	Report
1994	September 11	21	Bobby Bowsher (5)	Jack Bowsher (5)	Ford	150	75.0 mi (120.700 km)	N/A	59.867	Report
1995	Not held									
1996	July 7	46	Frank Kimmel (2)	Steve Rauch Racing	Pontiac	150	75.0 mi (120.700 km)	0:59:45	74.68	Report
1997	June 29	39	Ken Schrader	Roulo Brothers Racing (4)	Chevrolet	154*	77.0 mi (123.919 km)	0:59:42	77.386	Report
1998	June 28	46	Frank Kimmel (3)	Clement Racing	Chevrolet	150	75.0 mi (120.700 km)	0:52:05	86.4	Report
1999	June 25	97	Blaise Alexander	Blaise Alexander Racing	Chevrolet	150	75.0 mi (120.700 km)	1:00:13	74.73	Report
2000	June 23	46	Frank Kimmel (4)	Clement Racing (2)	Chevrolet	149*	74.5 mi (119.896 km)	1:02:46	71.216	Report
2001	September 16	46	Frank Kimmel (5)	Clement Racing (3)	Chevrolet	200	100.0 mi (160.934 km)	1:26:25	69.431	Report
2002	June 23	46	Frank Kimmel (6)	Clement Racing (4)	Ford	205*	102.5 mi (164.957 km)	1:41:00	60.89	Report
2003	May 4	46	Frank Kimmel (7)	Clement Racing (5)	Ford	200	100.0 mi (160.934 km)	1:29:14	67.239	Report
2004	May 16	99	Ken Schrader (2)	Ken Schrader Racing	Pontiac	204*	102.0 mi (164.153 km)	1:47:32	56.913	Report
2004	September 3	46	Frank Kimmel (8)	Clement Racing (6)	Ford	200	100.0 mi (160.934 km)	1:44:51	57.225	Report
2005	May 22	99	Ken Schrader (3)	Ken Schrader Racing (2)	Chevrolet	206*	103.0 mi (165.762 km)	1:59:50	51.572	Report
2005	September 2	46	Frank Kimmel (9)	Clement Racing (7)	Ford	205*	102.5 mi (164.957 km)	1:49:09	54.97	Report
2006	May 21	99	Ken Schrader (4)	Ken Schrader Racing (3)	Chevrolet	214*	107.0 mi (172.199 km)	1:34:00	68.298	Report
2006	September 1	35	Chuck Barnes, Jr.	C. E. Clower	Chevrolet	202*	101.0 mi (162.543 km)	1:47:07	56.574	Report
2007	May 20	22	Ken Butler III	Eddie Sharp Racing	Dodge	200	100.0 mi (160.934 km)	1:46:22	56.409	Report
2007	October 14	2	Michael McDowell	Eddie Sharp Racing (2)	Dodge	200	100.0 mi (160.934 km)	1:39:26	60.341	Report
2008	May 18	46	Matt Carter	Clement Racing (8)	Ford	204*	102.0 mi (164.153 km)	1:59:53	51.05	Report
2008	October 12	16	Justin Allgaier	Allgaier Motorsports	Chevrolet	200	100.0 mi (160.934 km)	1:49:48	54.645	Report
2009	May 17	77	Parker Kligerman	Cunningham Motorsports	Dodge	205*	102.5 mi (164.957 km)	1:48:03	55.495	Report
2009	September 4	6	Justin Lofton	Eddie Sharp Racing (3)	Toyota	200	100.0 mi (160.934 km)	1:43:05	58.205	Report
2010	May 23	17	Chris Buescher	Roulo Brothers Racing (5)	Ford	200	100.0 mi (160.934 km)	1:31:42	64.431	Report
2010	September 12	17	Chris Buescher (2)	Roulo Brothers Racing (6)	Ford	200	100.0 mi (160.934 km)	1:12:54	82.811	Report
2011	May 15	41	Ty Dillon	Richard Childress Racing	Chevrolet	200	100.0 mi (160.934 km)	1:32:54	64.579	Report
2011	October 16	17	Chris Buescher (3)	Roulo Brothers Racing (7)	Ford	206*	103.0 mi (165.762 km)	1:47:38	57.409	Report
2012	May 20	17	Chris Buescher (4)	Roulo Brothers Racing (8)	Ford	200	100.0 mi (160.934 km)	1:27:35	68.504	Report
2013	May 19	52	Ken Schrader (5)	Ken Schrader Racing (4)	Chevrolet	200	100.0 mi (160.934 km)	1:19:27	75.512	Report
2014	May 18	25	Justin Boston	Venturini Motorsports (2)	Toyota	200	100.0 mi (160.934 km)	1:15:31	79.453	Report
2015	May 17	55	Todd Gilliland*	Venturini Motorsports (3)	Toyota	200	100.0 mi (160.934 km)	1:38:55	60.662	Report
2016	May 22	22	Myatt Snider	Cunningham Motorsports (2)	Ford	200	100.0 mi (160.934 km)	1:27:35	78.92	Report
2017	May 21	28	Harrison Burton	MDM Motorsports	Toyota	200	100.0 mi (160.934 km)	1:46:12	56.494	Report
2018	May 20	41	Zane Smith	MDM Motorsports (2)	Toyota	200	100.0 mi (160.934 km)	1:19:30	75.477	Report
2019	May 19	20	Chandler Smith	Venturini Motorsports (4)	Toyota	152*	76.0 mi (122.310 km)	0:59:22	76.811	Report
2020	July 31	21	Sam Mayer	GMS Racing	Chevrolet	200	100.0 mi (160.934 km)	1:14:50	80.178	Report
2020	August 1–2	21	Sam Mayer (2)	GMS Racing (2)	Chevrolet	127*	63.5 mi (102.193 km)	0:52:76	73.126	Report
2020	September 12	21	Sam Mayer (3)	GMS Racing (3)	Chevrolet	200	100.0 mi (160.934 km)	1:32:54	64.586	Report
2021	May 22	18	Ty Gibbs	Joe Gibbs Racing	Toyota	200	100.0 mi (160.934 km)	1:16:47	78.142	Report
2022	October 8	18	Sammy Smith	Kyle Busch Motorsports	Toyota	200	100.0 mi (160.934 km)	1:16:47	75.188	Report
2023	October 7	18	William Sawalich	Joe Gibbs Racing (2)	Toyota	200	100.0 mi (160.934 km)	1:26:29	69.378	Report
2024	October 5	18	William Sawalich (2)	Joe Gibbs Racing (3)	Toyota	200	100.0 mi (160.934 km)	1:47:48	55.659	Report
2025	October 4	18	Max Reaves	Joe Gibbs Racing (4)	Toyota	200	100.0 mi (160.934 km)	1:11:14	84.23	Report
2026	May 16	77	Tristan McKee	Pinnacle Racing Group	Chevrolet	200	100.0 mi (160.934 km)	1:37:0	61.824	Report

Combined race between ARCA Series and NASCAR Grand National East
Combined race between ARCA Menards Series and ARCA Menards Series East

Notes

- 1991, 1993, 1994, 1997, 2002, 2004, 2005, 2006, 2008, 2009, & 2011: Race extended due to ARCA Menards Series overtime.
- 2000: Race shortened due to red flag.
- 2019 & 2020: Race shortened due to rain.

== ARCA Menards Series East ==
=== Past winners ===
Year	Date	No.	Driver	Team	Manufacturer	Race distance		Race time	Average speed (mph)	Report
Year	Date	No.	Driver	Team	Manufacturer	Laps	Miles (km)	Race time	Average speed (mph)	Report
2020	June 13	18	Ty Gibbs	Joe Gibbs Racing	Toyota	204*	102.0 mi (164.153 km)	1:30:48	67.401	Report
2020	September 12	21	Sam Mayer	GMS Racing	Chevrolet	200	100.0 mi (160.934 km)	1:32:54	64.586	Report
2021—2025	Not held									
2026	May 16	77	Tristan McKee	Pinnacle Racing Group	Chevrolet	200	100.0 mi (160.934 km)	1:37:0	61.824	Report

Combined race between ARCA Menards Series East and ARCA Menards Series
- 2020: Race extended due to ARCA Menards Series overtime.

Previous race: General Tire 100 at The Glen	ARCA Menards Series; Owens Corning 200	Next race: Henry Ford Health 200
