= Bobby Bowsher =

American racing driver

- Born: October 5, 1966 (age 60); Springfield, Ohio, U.S.
- Achievements: 1992, 1994 ARCA Racing Series Champion

ARCA Menards Series career
- 183 races run over 12 years
- Best finish: 1st (1992) & (1994)
- First race: 1988 Kil-Kare ARCA 250 (Kil-Kare)
- Last race: 2004 ReadyHosting.com 200 (Chicagoland)
- First win: 1990 Miller Genuine Draft 150 (Flat Rock)
- Last win: 1996 Bondo/Mar-Hyde 150 (Kil-Kare)
Wins	Top tens	Poles
17	109	18
- Statistics up to date as of November 4, 2022.

Bobby Bowsher (born October 5, 1966) is an American former professional racing driver. He is a two-time ARCA Racing Series champion, winning the title in 1992, and again in 1994. He is the son of three-time ARCA Racing Series champion Jack Bowsher, and the brother of fellow ARCA competitor Todd Bowsher.

== Racing career ==
Bowsher first made his ARCA Permatex SuperCar Series in 1988 driving the No. 01 Ford at Kil-Kare Raceway driving father Jack's family owned team, finishing 21st after starting 22nd. He would make ten more starts and earn two top tens with a ninth at Pocono Raceway, and a fifth at Salem Speedway.

Bowsher would run his first full season in ARCA the following year in 1989, driving the No. 01 Ford for his fathers team, and he would fourth overall in the series standings that year with eight top-tens, including two top-fives at Talladega Superspeedway, where he would finish fifth, and at Salem, where he would finish third. In 1990, now in the No. 21, he would win his first ARCA race at Flat Rock Speedway after leading the 116 out of 150 laps. He would win again at Kil-Kare and would get seven more top-tens to finish third in the points. In 1991, he would win four races, tying with Bob Keselowski with the most wins in the year. He would also win his first career pole at Flat Rock, a race he would later win. He would finish runner-up in the standings behind Bill Venturini.

In 1992, Bowsher would start the season, finishing in second place at the season opener at Daytona International Speedway. He would then finish in the top-ten in fifteen times in the next twenty races, including back-to-back wins late in the season at the Illinois State Fairgrounds Racetrack and Toledo Speedway on his way to his first ARCA series title ahead of Bob Keselowski. In the following year, he would win one race at Toledo and earn twelve top-tens to finish third in the standings behind Keselowski and eventual champion Tim Steele.

In 1994, Bowsher would start out the year with seven straight top-tens, including a win at Louisville Motor Speedway, which ended at Michigan Speedway, where he would finish 22nd. He would then have a streak of ten straight top-tens, including two wins at Kil-Kare and Toledo to win his second title ahead of future series champion Frank Kimmel. In the following year in 1995, he would win two races during the year, including Shady Bowl Speedway, where he would lead every lap, and would finish second in the standings behind Andy Hillenburg. In 1996, he would start the season on a low note finishing 40th at Daytona, but would win the pole in three of the next five races, including at Louisville, where he would win the event. He would earn his final two wins at Shady Bowl Speedway, and Kil-Kare, and would once again finish second in the standings behind Tim Steele. This would end up being his final full-time season in ARCA.

During his time away from ARCA from 1997 to 2002, he would run three races in the ASA National Tour in 2001, getting a best result of 18th at Memphis International Raceway and Winchester Speedway.

After a five year hiatus, Bowsher would return to the now ARCA Re/Max Series, returning to his family team driving the No. 55 Ford at Talladega as a teammate to his brother Todd. After starting 41st and last, he would go on to finish 25th in the race, albeit nine laps down. He would run three races in the following year, mainly serving as a start and park entry with a best finish of 32nd at Kansas Speedway. In 2004, Bowsher would run eight more races, finishing only two of those races, including his final top-ten at Springfield with a seventh place result. This would be his final season in ARCA competition as he has not raced since then.

== Personal life ==
Bowsher is married and has a daughter named Brittany.

== Motorsports results ==
=== ARCA Re/Max Series ===
(key) (Bold – Pole position awarded by qualifying time. Italics – Pole position earned by points standings or practice time. * – Most laps led. ** – All laps led.)

ARCA Re/Max Series results
Year	Team	No.	Make	1	2	3	4	5	6	7	8	9	10	11	12	13	14	15	16	17	18	19	20	21	22	23	24	25	ARSC	Pts	Ref
1988	Jack Bowsher & Associates	01	Ford	DAY	ATL	TAL	FRS	PCS	ROC	POC	WIN	KIL; 21	ACS; 15	SLM; 12	POC; 9	TAL; 15	DEL; 11	FRS; 24	ISF; 40	DSF; 19	SLM; 5	ATL							N/A	-	
1989	Jack Bowsher & Associates	01	Ford	DAY; 21	ATL; 36	KIL; 7	TAL; 9	FRS; 21	POC; 30	KIL; 13	HAG; 15	POC; 6	TAL; 5	DEL; 23	FRS; 9	ISF; 14	TOL; 7	DSF; 8	SLM; 3	ATL; 22									4th	2925	
1990	Jack Bowsher & Associates	21	Ford	DAY; 13	ATL; 24		TAL; 33		POC; 8			HAG; 4	POC; 12	TAL; 8	MCH; 16			DSF; 3	WIN; 2		ATL; 18								3rd	4665	
1990	Jack Bowsher & Associates	21	Pontiac			KIL; 3		FRS; 1*		KIL; 1	TOL; 2					ISF; 7	TOL; 15			DEL; 2									3rd	4665	
1991	Jack Bowsher & Associates	21	Ford	DAY; 2	ATL; 3		TAL; 5			POC; 10	MCH; 25				POC; 4	TAL; 6		MCH; 19			DSF; 2	TWS; 24	ATL; 31						2nd	4930	
1991	Jack Bowsher & Associates	21	Pontiac			KIL; 21		TOL; 1	**FRS**; 1			KIL; 2	FRS; 18	DEL; 5			HPT; 22		ISF; 1	TOL; 1*									2nd	4930	
1992	Jack Bowsher & Associates	21	Ford	DAY; 2		TWS; 16	TAL; 2	TOL; 3	KIL; 7	POC; 8	MCH; 7			NSH; 13	DEL; 2	POC; 8	HPT; 37	FRS; 7	ISF; 1	TOL; 1*	DSF; 5	TWS; 20	**SLM**; 6*	ATL; 10					1st	5675	
1992	Jack Bowsher & Associates	21	Pontiac		FIF; 10							FRS; 4	KIL; 21																1st	5675	
1993	Jack Bowsher & Associates	21	Ford	DAY; 5	FIF; 10	TWS; 12	TAL; 7	KIL; 21	CMS; 3	FRS; 10	TOL; 1*	POC; 9	MCH; 13	FRS; 4	POC; 36	**KIL**; 4	ISF; 9	DSF; 28	TOL; 2*	SLM; 21	WIN; 2	ATL; 37							3rd	4670	
1994	Jack Bowsher & Associates	21	Ford	DAY; 8	TAL; 2	FIF; 2	**LVL**; 1*	**KIL**; 2	**TOL**; 6	FRS; 3	**MCH**; 22	**DMS**; 4	POC; 5	POC; 5	KIL; 1	FRS; 3	IND; 3	I70; 4	ISF; 2	DSF; 2	TOL; 1*	SLM; 13	WIN; 5	ATL; 23					1st	6030	
1995	Jack Bowsher & Associates	21	Ford	DAY; 22	ATL; 29	TAL; 7	FIF; 3*	**KIL**; 1*	**FRS**; 3	MCH; 17	I80; 6	**MCS**; 5	FRS; 7	POC; 12	POC; 27	**KIL**; 13	FRS; 5	**SBS**; 1**	**LVL**; 2*	ISF; 26	DSF; 8	SLM; 7	WIN; 9	ATL; 11					2nd	5440	
1996	Jack Bowsher & Associates	21	Ford	DAY; 40	**ATL**; 5	SLM; 4	TAL; 11	**FIF**; 2	**LVL**; 1	CLT; 14	CLT; 16	KIL; 5	**FRS**; 13	POC; 9	MCH; 25	FRS; 2	**TOL**; 2	POC; 9	MCH; 5	INF; 39	**SBS**; 1*	ISF; 2	DSF; 3	**KIL**; 1*	SLM; 18	WIN; 19	CLT; 11	ATL; 9	2nd	6010	
2002	Jack Bowsher & Associates	55	Ford	DAY	ATL	NSH	SLM	KEN	CLT	KAN	POC	MCH	TOL	SBO	KEN	BLN	POC	NSH	ISF	WIN	DSF	CHI	SLM	TAL; 25	CLT				149th	105	
2003	Jack Bowsher & Associates	55	Ford	DAY	ATL	NSH	SLM	TOL	KEN	CLT	BLN	KAN; 32	MCH	LER	POC; 36	POC; 37	NSH	ISF	WIN	DSF	CHI	SLM	TAL	CLT	SBO				131st	165	
2004	Jack Bowsher & Associates	55	Ford	DAY	NSH	SLM	KEN	TOL	CLT	KAN; 28	POC; 34	MCH	SBO	BLN	KEN	GTW; 31	POC; 33	LER; 31	NSH	ISF; 7	TOL	DSF; 20	CHI; 37	SLM	TAL				37th	735	

Sporting positions
Preceded by Bill Venturini	ARCA SuperCar Series champion 1992	Succeeded by Tim Steele
Preceded by Tim Steele	ARCA Hooters SuperCar Series champion 1994	Succeeded by Andy Hillenburg
