= Dutch Boy 150 =

Dutch Boy 150 may refer to:

- Dutch Boy 150 (Gateway), former race at Gateway Motorsports Park
- ARCA races at Flat Rock, race at Flat Rock Speedway
