= ARCA races at Indianapolis Raceway Park =

ARCA Menards Series race at Indianapolis Raceway Park

ARCA Menards Series at Lucas Oil Indianapolis Raceway Park

ARCA Menards Series
- Venue: Lucas Oil Indianapolis Raceway Park
- Location: Brownsburg, Indiana, United States

Circuit information
- Surface: Asphalt
- Length: 0.686 mi (1.104 km)
- Turns: 4

Stock car racing events in the ARCA Menards Series have been held at Lucas Oil Indianapolis Raceway Park, in Brownsburg, Indiana during numerous seasons and times of year since 1972.

== Current race ==
LiUNA! 150
ARCA Menards Series/ARCA Menards Series East
- Venue: Lucas Oil Indianapolis Raceway Park
- Location: Brownsburg, Indiana
- Corporate sponsor: LiUNA! (title sponsor); IDEAL Garage Doors (presenting sponsor)
- First race: 1971
- Distance: 102.9 mi (165.6 km)
- Laps: 150
- Previous names: Indianapolis 100 (1972); IRP ARCA 200 (1983); Carquest ARCA 200 (1984); Kroger 200 (June 1985); Ansell Protective Gloves 200 (2011); Messina Wildlife Animal Stopper 200 (2012); Scott Get Geared Up 200 (2014); Sioux Chief PowerPEX 200 (2015–2017); Shore Lunch 200 (2018); Herr's Potato Chips 200 (2019); Calypso Lemonade 200 (2020); Reese's 200 (2022–2023); Circle City 200 (2024)
- Most wins (driver): Chandler Smith (3)
- Most wins (team): Venturini Motorsports (5)
- Most wins (manufacturer): Toyota (8)

Circuit information
- Surface: Asphalt
- Length: 0.686 mi (1.104 km)
- Turns: 4

The LiUNA! 150 is a 102.9-mile (165.6 km), 150-lap annual ARCA Menards Series / ARCA Menards Series East combination race held at Lucas Oil Indianapolis Raceway Park in Brownsburg, Indiana. Kaden Honeycutt is the defending race winner.

=== History ===
ARCA debuted at the track in 1971, when it ran for two years consecutively, and once more in 1974. The race returned again in 1983, when it ran for three consecutive years with a second race in 1985. The track remained off the schedule until 2011, when it was added back to the schedule. The race would again go on hiatus for the 2013 season, but returned in 2014. Calypso Lemonade became the title sponsor of the race in 2020. The race was taken off the schedule in 2021 but added back on in 2022 and Reese's became the title sponsor of the race that year. In 2024, Reese's didn't return as a sponsor and the race went by the Circle City 200. In 2025, the race was shortened to 150 laps and Dutch Boy was added on as a presenting sponsor. Months before the race, it was announced that LiUNA! would sponsor the race with Dutch Boy remaining the presenting sponsor.

=== Past winners ===
Year	Date	No.	Driver	Team	Manufacturer	Race Distance		Report	Ref
Year	Date	No.	Driver	Team	Manufacturer	Laps	Miles (km)	Report	Ref
0.625-mile (1.006 km) paved oval
1971	June 19	7	Ramo Stott	N/A	Plymouth	100	62.5 (100.584)	Report	
1972	June 10	26	Ralph Latham	N/A	Chevrolet	100	62.5 (100.584)	Report	
1973	Not held								
1974	July 6		Bruce Gould	N/A	Ford	100		Report	
1975 – 1982	Not held								
0.686-mile (1.104 km) paved oval
1983	June 11	1	Marvin Smith	Jim Coyle	Buick	100	68.6 (110.401)	Report	
1984	July 7	75	Bob Schacht	Tom Reet Racing	Pontiac	100	68.6 (110.401)	Report	
1985	June 22	00	Jimmy Hensley	Thomas Brothers Racing	Oldsmobile	200	137.2 (220.802)	Report	
1986 – 2010	Not held								
2011	July 28	41	Ty Dillon	Richard Childress Racing	Chevrolet	203*	139.258 (224.114)	Report	
2012	July 27	44	Frank Kimmel	ThorSport Racing	Toyota	200	137.2 (220.802)	Report	
2013	Not held								
2014	July 25	4	Brandon Jones	Turner Scott Motorsports	Chevrolet	200	137.2 (220.802)	Report	
2015	July 24	01	Travis Braden	Platinum Motorsports	Chevrolet	200	137.2 (220.802)	Report	
2016	July 22	77	Chase Briscoe	Cunningham Motorsports	Ford	200	137.2 (220.802)	Report	
2017	July 21	77	Dalton Sargeant	Cunningham Motorsports	Ford	200	137.2 (220.802)	Report	
2018	October 6	15	Christian Eckes	Venturini Motorsports	Toyota	200	137.2 (220.802)	Report	
2019	October 5	20	Chandler Smith	Venturini Motorsports	Toyota	167*	114.562 (184.370)	Report	
2020	July 4	20	Chandler Smith	Venturini Motorsports	Toyota	200	137.2 (220.802)	Report	
2021	Not held								
2022	July 29	15	Chandler Smith	Venturini Motorsports	Toyota	200	137.2 (220.802)	Report	
2023	August 11	20	Jesse Love	Venturini Motorsports	Toyota	200	137.2 (220.802)	Report	
2024	July 19	28	Connor Zilisch	Pinnacle Racing Group	Chevrolet	202*	139.2 (222.802)	Report	
2025	July 25	18	Brent Crews	Joe Gibbs Racing	Toyota	150	102.9 (165.6)	Report	
2026	July 24	17	Kaden Honeycutt	Cook Racing Technologies	Toyota	150	102.9 (165.6)	Report	

Notes:

- 2019: Race shortened to 167 laps due to rain.
- 2011, 2024: Race extended due to green/white/checker.

=== Multiple winners (drivers) ===
# Wins	Team	Years won
3	Chandler Smith	2019, 2020, 2022

=== Multiple winners (teams) ===
# Wins	Team	Years won
5	Venturini Motorsports	2018–2020, 2022, 2023
2	Cunningham Motorsports	2016, 2017

=== Manufacturer wins ===
# Wins	Manufacturer	Years won
8	Toyota	2012, 2018–2020, 2022, 2023, 2025, 2026
5	Chevrolet	1972, 2011, 2014, 2015, 2024
3	Ford	1974, 2016, 2017
1	Plymouth	1971
1	Buick	1983
1	Pontiac	1984
1	Oldsmobile	1985

== Former race ==
Carquest 150
ARCA Menards Series
- First race: 1985
- Last race: 1985

Circuit information
- Surface: Asphalt
- Length: 0.686 mi (1.104 km)
- Turns: 4

The Carquest 150 was a ARCA Menards Series race held at Lucas Oil Indianapolis Raceway Park.

=== Past winners ===
Year	Date	No.	Driver	Team	Manufacturer	Race Distance		Report	Ref
Year	Date	No.	Driver	Team	Manufacturer	Laps	Miles (km)	Report	Ref
1985	August 3	75	Bob Schacht	Tom Reet Racing	Pontiac	150	102.9 (165.602)	Report	

Previous race: Lime Rock Park ARCA 100	ARCA Menards Series; LiUNA! 150	Next race: JR & CO. 150

Previous race: Owens Corning 200	ARCA Menards Series East; LiUNA! 150	Next race: Sunbelt Rentals 150
