= ARCA races at Salem =

ARCA Menards Series event at Salem Speedway

ARCA Menards Series
- Venue: Salem Speedway
- Location: Salem, Indiana, United States

Circuit information
- Surface: Asphalt
- Length: 0.555 mi (0.893 km)
- Turns: 4

Stock car racing events in the ARCA Menards Series have been held at Salem Speedway, in Salem, Indiana during numerous seasons and times of year since 1955.

Frank Kimmel is the only multi-time winner of the spring event, taking four victories. He also won the fall event five times, totaling nine wins at the track. Tim Steele was victorious four times at the track, including winning the fall event three times. Tom Hessert III and Bob Strait are also multi-time winners of the fall event.

== History ==
ARCA (then known as MARC) first raced at Salem Speedway in 1955, with Jack Harrison winning the inaugural race. Unfortunately, during this race, Ray Duhigg was killed when his car flew out of the track in turn 1. From 1955 to 1979, the track became a staple on the ARCA schedule, though it was left off of the series schedule in 1958, 1960, 1961, and 1978. From 1968 to 1974, ARCA held a 500-lap event at the track, named the Salem 500. The event was briefly revived in 1988 and 1989.

After 1979, the series did not race at the track from 1980 to 1986. The track held one ARCA race in 1987, two in 1988 and one in 1989. The series did not race at the track again in 1990 and 1991. The track returned to the series' schedule in 1992.

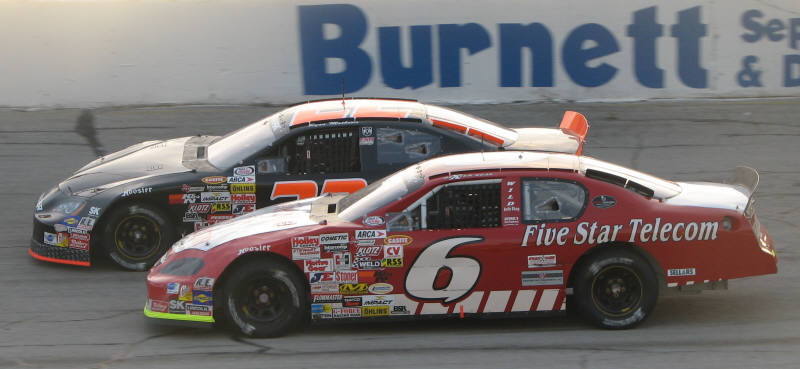
Dexter Bean (No. 6) and Ryan Mathews (No. 22) racing each other in the September 2006 ARCA race at Salem

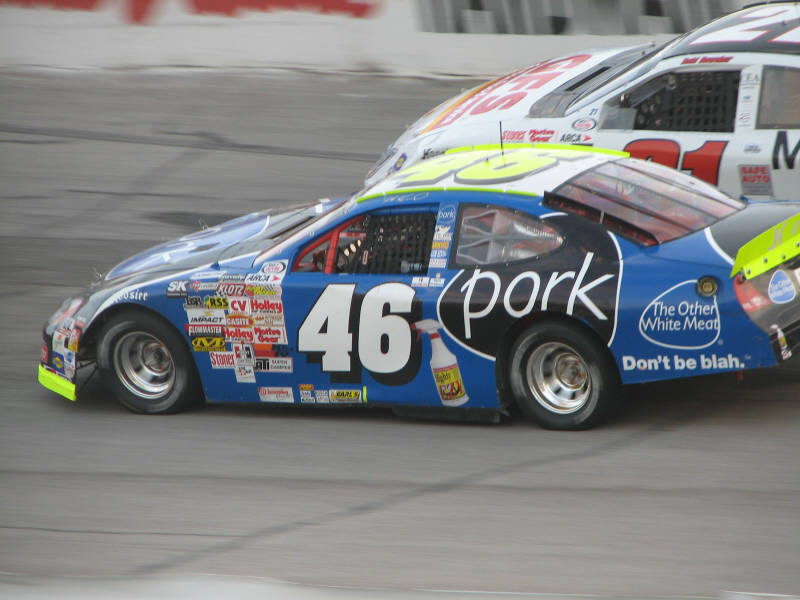
Frank Kimmel (No. 46) and Todd Bowsher (No. 21) racing each other in the September 2006 ARCA race at Salem

From 1996 to 2019, the track had two ARCA races, one in the spring and one in the fall. In 2020, the fall race was taken off the schedule and the series was only scheduled to race there in the spring. However, the race was cancelled due to the COVID-19 pandemic. The track returned to the ARCA schedule in 2021 with one race in the fall. In 2024, the track's one race was moved from the fall to the summer.

== Current race ==
Spruce 212
- Corporate sponsor: Spruce
- First race: 1955
- Distance: 117.66 mi (189.36 km)
- Laps: 212
- Previous names: Salem ARCA 100 (1979); Fall 200 (1987); Salem ARCA 200 (1988, 2024); Salem 500 (1989); Salem Fall Classic 200 (1992); Fall Classic 200 (1993–1994); Eddie Gilstrap Fall Classic (1995); Engineered Components 200 (1996)Kentuckiana Ford Dealers 200 (1997–2004, 2008–2009, 2011–2013); Kentuckiana Ford Dealers ARCA 200 (2005–2007, 2010, 2017–2019, 2024); Federated Auto Parts 200 (2014–2015); Sioux Chief PowerPEX 200 (2021); Herr's Snacks 200 (2022); Atlas 200 (2023); Spruce 212 (2026)
- Most wins (driver): Frank Kimmel (4)
- Most wins (team): Venturini Motorsports (8)
- Most wins (manufacturer): Chevrolet (13)

The Spruce 212 is an annual 212-lap 117.66-mile (189.36 km) ARCA Menards Series race held at Salem Speedway.

Max Reaves is the defending winner of the event, having won the race in 2026. Frank Kimmel has the most wins for the current event, taking four victories.

=== History ===
ARCA (then known as MARC) first raced at Salem in 1955, with Jack Harrison winning the inaugural race. Unfortunately, during this race, Ray Duhigg was killed when his car flew out of the track in turn 1.

From 1996 to 2019, the track had two ARCA races, one in the spring and one in the fall. In 2020, the fall race was taken off the schedule and the series was only scheduled to race there in the spring. However, the race was cancelled due to the COVID-19 pandemic. The track returned to the ARCA schedule in 2021 with one race in the fall. In 2024, the track's one race was moved from the fall to the summer.

In 2025, it was announced that Kentuckiana Ford Dealers would return as the title sponsor for the first time since 2019 and the race was moved from the summer to fall. For 2026, the race was extended from 200 laps to 212 laps, with the race being dubbed as the Spruce 212, and the race was put on FOX.

=== Past winners ===
Year	Date	Winner	Team	Manufacturer	Race Distance		Race Time	Average Speed (mph)	Report	Ref
Year	Date	Winner	Team	Manufacturer	Laps	Miles (km)	Race Time	Average Speed (mph)	Report	Ref
1955	October 9	Jack Harrison	N/A	Buick	100	55.5 (89.319)	Unknown	Unknown	Report	
1956	April 15	Jack Harrison	N/A	Ford	100	55.5 (89.319)	Unknown	Unknown	Report	
1957	May 5	Nelson Stacy	N/A	Chevrolet	200	111 (178.637)	Unknown	Unknown	Report	
1958	Not held									
1959	June 14	Don White	N/A	Ford	100	55.5 (89.319)	Unknown	Unknown	Report	
1960 – 1961	Not held									
1962	June 3	Bobby Watson	N/A	Ford	100	55.5 (89.319)	37:58	Unknown	Report	
1963	May 26	Earl Balmer	N/A	Ford	100	55.5 (89.319)	Unknown	Unknown	Report	
1964	June 7	Jack Bowsher	N/A	Ford	100	55.5 (89.319)	Unknown	Unknown	Report	
1965	June 13	Jack Bowsher	N/A	Ford	100	55.5 (89.319)	Unknown	Unknown	Report	
1966	June 5	Butch Hartman	N/A	Dodge	100	55.5 (89.319)	Unknown	Unknown	Report	
1967	June 4	Elmer Davis	N/A	Ford	100	55.5 (89.319)	Unknown	Unknown	Report	
1968	April 28	Benny Parsons	N/A	Ford	100	55.5 (89.319)	Unknown	Unknown	Report	
1969	April 13	Les Snow	N/A	Plymouth	100	55.5 (89.319)	34:31	86.912	Report	
1970	September 13	Iggy Katona	N/A	Dodge	100	55.5 (89.319)	34:10	Unknown	Report	
1971	April 4	Ramo Stott	N/A	Plymouth	100	55.5 (89.319)	Unknown	Unknown	Report	
1972	May 21	Ron Hutcherson	N/A	Ford	100	55.5 (89.319)	Unknown	Unknown	Report	
1973	April 29	Bobby Watson	N/A	Chevrolet	100	55.5 (89.319)	44:22	Unknown	Report	
1974	June 9	Bruce Gould	N/A	Ford	100	55.5 (89.319)	Unknown	Unknown	Report	
1975	April 6	Dave Dayton	N/A	Chevrolet	100	55.5 (89.319)	Unknown	Unknown	Report	
1976	June 6	Albert Arnold	N/A	Chevrolet	100	55.5 (89.319)	Unknown	Unknown	Report	
1977	July 3	Moose Myers	N/A	Chevrolet	200	111 (178.637)	1:11:42	83.680	Report	
1979	July 1	Marvin Smith	N/A	Oldsmobile	100	50 (80.47)	Unknown	Unknown	Report	
1980 – 1986	Not held									
1987	October 4	Bob Keselowski	K Automotive Racing	Chevrolet	200	111 (178.64)	1:28:00	68.182	Report	
1988	July 10	Larry Moore	N/A	Chevrolet	200	111 (178.64)	1:02:58	82.66	Report	
1989	October 8	Bob Schacht	Bob Schacht Motorsports	Buick	500	277.5 (446.59)	3:50:38	72.193	Report	
1990 – 1991	Not held									
1992	September 27	Bob Strait	Bob Schacht Motorsports	Oldsmobile	200	100 (160.93)	1:24:33	70.964	Report	
1993	September 26	Bob Strait	Bob Schacht Motorsports	Ford	202*	101 (162.54)	1:34:33	64.093	Report	
1994	September 25	Scott Neal	N/A	Oldsmobile	200	100 (160.93)	1:48:52	55.113	Report	
1995	September 24	Tim Steele	Steele Racing	Ford	200	100 (160.93)	1:34:19	63.615	Report	
1996	April 20	Tobey Butler	N/A	Chevrolet	200	111 (178.64)	1:34:15	70.663	Report	
1997	April 20	Tim Steele	Steele Racing	Ford	200	111 (178.64)	1:27:15	76.332	Report	
1998	April 19	Frank Kimmel	Clement Racing	Chevrolet	207*	114.89 (184.90)	1:53:15	60.866	Report	
1999	April 18	Bill Baird	Ken Schrader Racing	Chevrolet	205*	113.78 (183.11)	1:40:16	68.083	Report	
2000	April 30	Tracy Leslie	Bowsher Motorsports	Ford	205*	113.78 (183.11)	1:43:49	65.755	Report	
2001	April 29	Frank Kimmel	Clement Racing	Chevrolet	200	111 (178.64)	1:32:32	71.948	Report	
2002	April 28	Frank Kimmel	Clement Racing	Ford	200	111 (178.64)	1:33:38	71.285	Report	
2003	April 27	Shelby Howard	CIMCO Racing	Dodge	200	111 (178.64)	1:43:52	64.12	Report	
2004	April 25	Frank Kimmel	Clement Racing	Ford	200	111 (178.64)	1:50:16	60.399	Report	
2005	April 24	Chad Blount	ML Motorsports	Chevrolet	200	111 (178.64)	1:48:23	61.449	Report	
2006	April 23	Billy Venturini	Venturini Motorsports	Chevrolet	200	111 (178.64)	1:40:28	66.291	Report	
2007	April 22	Brian Keselowski	K Automotive Racing	Dodge	200	111 (178.64)	2:04:54	53.323	Report	
2008	April 13	Justin Allgaier	Allgaier Motorsports	Chevrolet	204*	113.22 (182.21)	1:52:18	60.492	Report	
2009	April 5	Patrick Sheltra	Sheltra Motorsports	Dodge	200	111 (178.64)	1:36:50	68.778	Report	
2010	April 11	Steve Arpin	Venturini Motorsports	Chevrolet	200	111 (178.64)	1:47:12	62.126	Report	
2011	May 1	Brennan Poole	Venturini Motorsports	Chevrolet	206*	114.33 (184)	1:48:57	62.965	Report	
2012	April 29	Alex Bowman	Cunningham Motorsports	Dodge	200	111 (178.64)	1:38:57	67.312	Report	
2013	April 28	Tom Hessert III	Cunningham Motorsports	Dodge	203*	112.67 (181.32)	1:49:25	61.78	Report	
2014	April 27	Grant Enfinger	Team BCR Racing	Ford	202*	112.11 (180.42)	1:36:06	69.35	Report	
2015	April 26	Ken Schrader	Ken Schrader Racing	Chevrolet	200	111 (178.64)	1:29:23	74.509	Report	
2016	April 24	Christopher Bell	Venturini Motorsports	Toyota	200	111 (178.64)	1:27:35	76.04	Report	
2017	April 30	Dalton Sargeant	Cunningham Motorsports	Ford	200	111 (178.64)	1:14:54	88.913	Report	
2018	April 22	Christian Eckes	Venturini Motorsports	Toyota	200	111 (178.64)	1:30:21	73.11	Report	
2019	April 14	Michael Self	Venturini Motorsports	Toyota	101*	56.06 (90.22)	38:18	89.887	Report	
2020	April 19	Cancelled due to the COVID-19 pandemic								
2021	September 25	Jesse Love	Venturini Motorsports	Toyota	200	111 (178.64)	1:25:30	78.307	Report	
2022	October 1	Sammy Smith	Kyle Busch Motorsports	Toyota	200	111 (178.64)	1:23:24	79.856	Report	
2023	September 30	Jesse Love	Venturini Motorsports	Toyota	200	111 (178.64)	1:29:11	74.678	Report	
2024	July 27	William Sawalich	Joe Gibbs Racing	Toyota	200	111 (178.64)	1:39:40	66.823	Report	
2025	September 20	Brenden Queen	Pinnacle Racing Group	Chevrolet	200	111 (178.64)	1:13:13	90.963	Report	
2026	September 12	Max Reaves	Joe Gibbs Racing	Toyota	216*	119 (192.928)	1:50:5	64.868	Report	

- 1998—2000, 2008, 2011, 2013, 2014 & 2026: Race extended due to a green–white–checker finish.
- 2019 Race shortened due to rain.

==== Multiple winners (drivers) ====
# Wins	Driver	Years won
4	Frank Kimmel	1998, 2001, 2002, 2004
2	Bob Strait	1992, 1993
2	Ken Schrader	2008, 2015
2	Jesse Love	2021, 2023

==== Manufacturer wins ====
# Wins	Manufacturer	Years won
13	Chevrolet	1987, 1988, 1996, 1998, 1999, 2001, 2005, 2006, 2008, 2010, 2011, 2015, 2025
8	Ford	1993, 1995, 1997, 2000, 2002, 2004, 2014, 2017
7	Toyota	2016, 2018, 2019, 2021, 2023, 2024, 2026
5	Dodge	2003, 2007, 2009, 2012, 2013
3	Oldsmobile	1979, 1992, 1994
1	Buick	1989

== Former second race ==
Kentuckiana Ford Dealers ARCA Fall Classic 200
- Corporate sponsor: Kentuckiana Ford Dealers
- First race: 1956
- Distance: 111 mi (179 km)
- Laps: 200
- Previous names: Snap-On Tools 500 (1988); Eddie Gilstrap Motors Fall Classic (1996–1997, 2000, 2003, 2005–2007, 2016–2017); Eddie Gistrap 200 (1998); Eddie Gistrap Motors 200 (1999, 2001–2002, 2004, 2008); Kentuckiana Ford Dealers ARCA Fall Classic (2009–2013, 2016, 2018–2019); Federated Car Care Fall Classic 200 (2014–2015)
- Most wins (driver): Frank Kimmel (5)
- Most wins (manufacturer): Chevrolet (8)

The Kentuckiana Ford Dealers ARCA Fall Classic 200 was an annual 200-lap 111-mile (179 km) ARCA Menards Series race held at Salem Speedway.

Ty Gibbs is the defending winner of the event, having won the race in 2019. Frank Kimmel has the most wins for the current event, taking five victories.

=== Past winners ===
Year	Date	Winner	Team	Manufacturer	Race Distance		Race Time	Average Speed (mph)	Report	Ref
Year	Date	Winner	Team	Manufacturer	Laps	Miles (km)	Race Time	Average Speed (mph)	Report	Ref
1956	July 1	Hershel White	N/A	Oldsmobile	100	55.5 (89.319)	Unknown	Unknown	Report	
1957 – 1961	Not held									
1962	August 26	Dick Freeman	N/A	Ford	100	55.5 (89.319)	Unknown	Unknown	Report	
1963	June 23	Jim Cushman	N/A	Plymouth	100	55.5 (89.319)	37:47	79.381	Report	
1964	August 23	Jack Bowsher	N/A	Ford	200	111 (178.637)	Unknown	Unknown	Report	
1965	August 22	Jack Bowsher	N/A	Ford	100	55.5 (89.319)	Unknown	Unknown	Report	
1966	August 21	Andy Hampton	N/A	Dodge	100	55.5 (89.319)	Unknown	Unknown	Report	
1967	August 20	Les Snow	N/A	Dodge	100	55.5 (89.319)	Unknown	Unknown	Report	
1968	June 9	Les Snow	N/A	Plymouth	100	55.5 (89.319)	Unknown	Unknown	Report	
1969	June 8	Andy Hampton	N/A	Dodge	100	55.5 (89.319)	Unknown	Unknown	Report	
1970	October 11	Ramo Stott	N/A	Plymouth	500	277.5 (446.593)	3:42:16	67.486	Report	
1971	October 17	Ramo Stott	N/A	Plymouth	500	277.5 (446.593)	Unknown	Unknown	Report	
1972	July 30	Andy Hampton	N/A	Ford	100	55.5 (89.319)	48:53	Unknown	Report	
1973	July 29	Bruce Gould	N/A	Ford	100	55.5 (89.319)	38:53	77.151	Report	
1974	October 6	Bruce Gould	N/A	Ford	500	277.5 (446.593)	Unknown	Unknown	Report	
1975	July 6	Bobby Allison	N/A	Chevrolet	200	111 (178.637)	Unknown	Unknown	Report	
1976	September 12	LaMarr Marshall	N/A	Chevrolet	100	55.5 (89.319)	Unknown	Unknown	Report	
1977	October 9	Brad Malcuit	N/A	Chevrolet	100	55.5 (89.319)	Unknown	Unknown	Report	
1978 — 1987	Not held									
1988	September 25	Bob Brevak	Brevak Racing	Buick	500	277.5 (446.59)	Unknown	Unknown	Report	
1989 — 1995	Not held									
1996	September 22	Tim Steele	Steele Racing	Ford	200	111 (178.64)	1:05:06	59.94	Report	
1997	September 21	Tim Steele	Steele Racing	Ford	204*	113.22 (182.21)	1:41:41	65.079	Report	
1998	September 13	Frank Kimmel	Clement Racing	Chevrolet	200	111 (178.64)	1:30:19	73.74	Report	
1999	September 12	Ken Schrader	Ken Schrader Racing	Chevrolet	201*	111.56 (179.54)	1:28:39	75.502	Report	
2000	September 10	Frank Kimmel	Clement Racing	Chevrolet	205*	113.78 (183.11)	1:50:13	61.93	Report	
2001	September 9	Frank Kimmel	Clement Racing	Chevrolet	191*	106.01 (170.61)	1:31:10	69.765	Report	
2002	September 15	Frank Kimmel	Clement Racing	Ford	200	111 (178.64)	1:31:36	72.707	Report	
2003	September 13	Shelby Howard	CIMCO Racing	Dodge	204*	113.22 (182.21)	1:46:19	63.896	Report	
2004	September 18	Jason Jarrett	ML Motorsports	Chevrolet	211*	117.11 (188.47)	1:52:54	62.235	Report	
2005	September 17	Joey Miller	Hagans Racing	Dodge	213*	118.22 (190.26)	2:04:17	57.07	Report	
2006	September 16	Blake Bjorklund	Country Joe Racing	Dodge	200	111 (178.64)	1:54:28	58.183	Report	
2007	September 15	Justin Allgaier	Allgaier Motorsports	Chevrolet	200	111 (178.64)	1:33:02	71.587	Report	
2008	September 13	Frank Kimmel	Clements Racing	Ford	200	111 (178.64)	1:37:03	68.624	Report	
2009	September 19	Justin Lofton	Eddie Sharp Racing	Toyota	200	111 (178.64)	1:20:47	82.443	Report	
2010	September 18	Dakoda Armstrong	Cunningham Motorsports	Dodge	200	111 (178.64)	1:16:00	87.63	Report	
2011	September 17	Chris Buescher	Roulo Brothers Racing	Ford	200	111 (178.64)	1:30:03	73.951	Report	
2012	September 15	Tom Hessert III	Ken Schrader Racing	Chevrolet	200	111 (178.64)	1:36:04	69.319	Report	
2013	September 14	Kyle Benjamin	Venturini Motorsports	Toyota	200	111 (178.64)	1:17:03	86.432	Report	
2014	September 13	Tom Hessert III	Cunningham Motorsports	Dodge	200	111 (178.64)	1:09:34	95.746	Report	
2015	September 19	Grant Enfinger	GMS Racing	Chevrolet	200	111 (178.64)	1:29:18	74.58	Report	
2016	September 10	Christopher Bell	Venturini Motorsports	Toyota	200	111 (178.64)	1:18:22	84.99	Report	
2017	September 9	Austin Theriault	Ken Schrader Racing	Ford	200	111 (178.64)	1:17:12	86.30	Report	
2018	September 15	Chandler Smith	Venturini Motorsports	Toyota	200	111 (178.64)	1:34:37	70.38	Report	
2019	September 14	Ty Gibbs	Joe Gibbs Racing	Toyota	200	111 (178.64)	1:26:54	76.64	Report	

- 1993, 1997, 1999, 2000, 2003–2005: Race extended due to a green–white–checker finish.
- 2001: Race shortened due to rain.

=== Multiple winners (drivers) ===
# Wins	Driver	Years won
5	Frank Kimmel	1998, 2000–2002, 2008
3	Tim Steele	1995, 1998
3	Tom Hessert III	2012, 2014

=== Manufacturer wins ===
# Wins	Manufacturer	Years won
8	Chevrolet	1998–2001, 2004, 2007, 2012, 2015
6	Ford	1996, 1997, 2002, 2008, 2011, 2017
5	Toyota	2009, 2013, 2016, 2018, 2019
5	Dodge	2003, 2005, 2006, 2010, 2014
1	Buick	1988

== Former third race ==
- First race: 1956
- Last race: 1985
- Distance: 111 mi (179 km)
- Laps: 200
- Most wins (driver): Jack Bowsher; Dave Dayton (2)
- Most wins (manufacturer): Ford (5)

The third ARCA Menards Series race at Salem Speedway was an annual 200-lap 111-mile (179 km) race held from 1956 to 1975.

Dave Dayton is the defending winner of the event, having won the race in 1975. Jack Bowsher and Dayton has the most wins for the current event, taking two victories each.

=== Past winners ===
Year	Date	Winner	Team	Manufacturer	Race Distance		Race Time	Average Speed (mph)	Report	Ref
Year	Date	Winner	Team	Manufacturer	Laps	Miles (km)	Race Time	Average Speed (mph)	Report	Ref
1956	August 26	Jack Harrison	N/A	Ford	100	55.5 (89.319)	Unknown	Unknown	Report	
1957 – 1962	Not held									
1963	August 25	Jack Bowsher	N/A	Ford	100	55.5 (89.319)	Unknown	Unknown	Report	
1964	September 20	Jack Bowsher	N/A	Ford	200	111 (178.637)	Unknown	Unknown	Report	
1965	Not held									
1966	September 11	Les Snow	N/A	Dodge	100	55.5 (89.319)	Unknown	Unknown	Report	
1967	Not held									
1968	September 15	Benny Parsons	N/A	Ford	100	55.5 (89.319)	Unknown	Unknown	Report	
1969	September 7	Ramo Stott	N/A	Plymouth	500	277.5 (446.593)	3:14:12	Unknown	Report	
1970 – 1971	Not held									
1972	October 15	Ron Hutcherson	N/A	Ford	500	277.5 (446.593)	Unknown	Unknown	Report	
1973	October 7	Dave Dayton	N/A	Chevrolet	500	277.5 (446.593)	3:36:05	Unknown	Report	
1974	Not held									
1975	October 12	Dave Dayton	N/A	Chevrolet	100	55.5 (89.319)	Unknown	Unknown	Report	

=== Multiple winners (drivers) ===
# Wins	Driver	Years won
2	Jack Bowsher	1963–1964
2	Dave Dayton	1973, 1975

=== Manufacturer wins ===
# Wins	Manufacturer	Years won
5	Ford	1956, 1963, 1964, 1968, 1972
2	Chevrolet	1973, 1975
1	Dodge	1966
1	Plymouth	1969

== Former fourth race ==
- First race: 1956
- Last race: 1968
- Distance: 111 mi (179 km)
- Laps: 200

The fourth ARCA Menards Series race at Salem Speedway was an annual 200-lap 111-mile (179 km) race held from 1956 to 1968.

Roy Wathen is the defending winner of the event, having won the race in 1968.

=== Past winners ===
Year	Date	Winner	Team	Manufacturer	Race Distance		Race Time	Average Speed (mph)	Report	Ref
Year	Date	Winner	Team	Manufacturer	Laps	Miles (km)	Race Time	Average Speed (mph)	Report	Ref
1956	October 14	Troy Ruttman	N/A	Ford	100	55.5 (89.319)	41:25	72.435	Report	
1968	October 20	Roy Wathen	N/A	Chevrolet	500	277.5 (446.593)	3:28:38	71.891	Report	

Previous race: Audubon Park 100	ARCA Menards Series; Spruce 212	Next race: Bush's Beans 200
