= ARCA races at Flat Rock =

Stock-car race in Ash Township, Michigan, USA

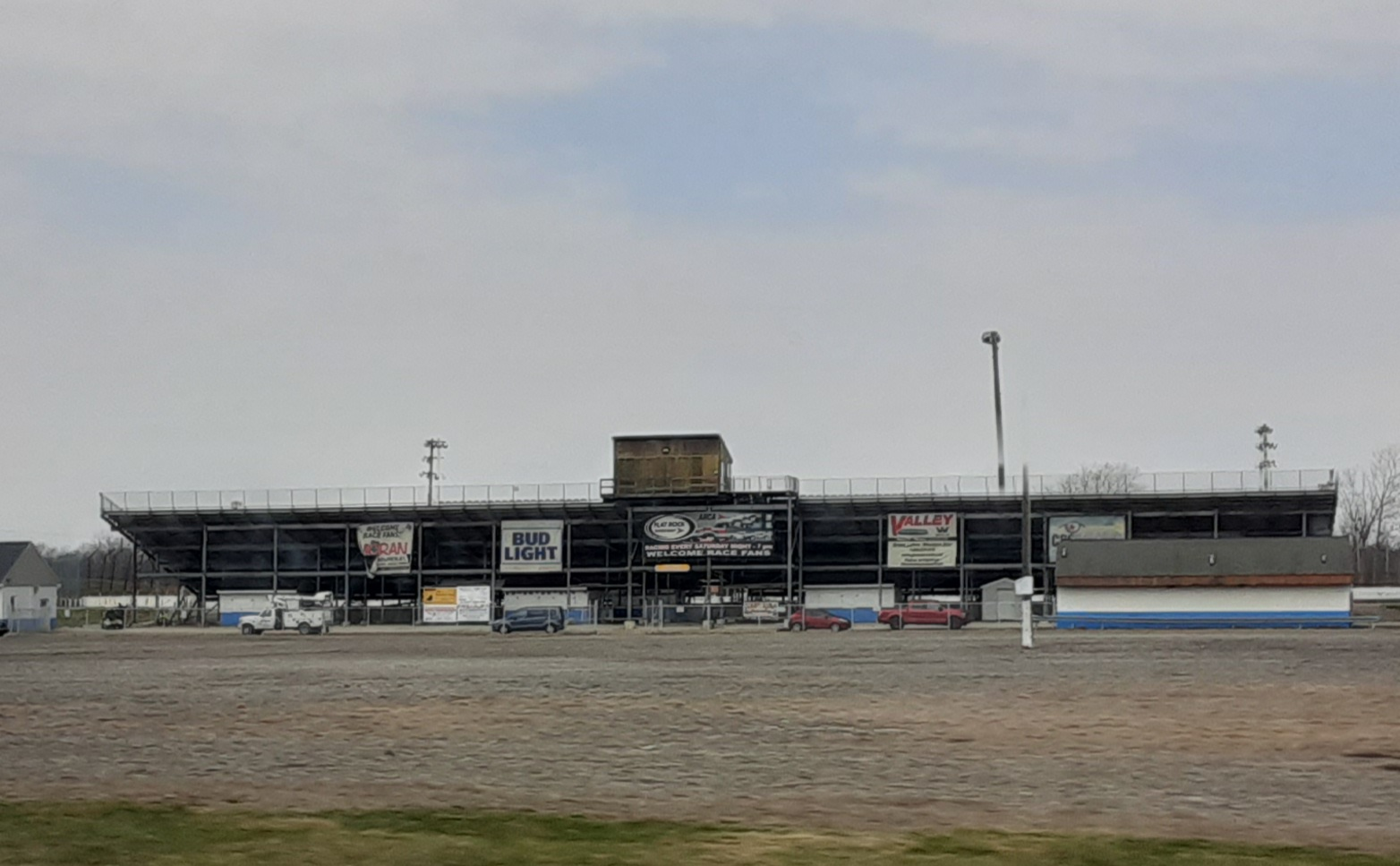
- Venue: Flat Rock Speedway
- Location: Ash Township, Michigan, United States

Circuit information
- Surface: Asphalt
- Length: 0.25 mi (0.40 km)
- Turns: 4

Stock car racing events in the ARCA Menards Series have been held at Flat Rock Speedway in Ash Township, Michigan during numerous seasons and times of year. A race has been run at the track each year since 1985 except from 2001–2022.

== ARCA Menards Series ==
Jasper Engines & Transmissions 150
- Corporate sponsor: Jasper Engines & Transmissions
- First race: 1985
- Last race: 2000
- Laps: 150
- Previous names: Howard Williams Memorial (1979–1985); Flat Rock 100 (1979–1984); Flat Rock 75 (1980–1981); Flat Rock 125 (1986); Miller High Life ARCA 125 (1987); Grand Auto Parts 150 (1987); Miller High Life 150 (1988, 1989); Jomar Race Engines 150 (1988); Metro 25 Tire Centers 150 (1989, 1991–1995); Miller Genuine Draft 150 (1990, 1991–1996); Metro Tire Centers 150 (1993); AC Delco 150 (1995, 1996); Clarklift of Detroit 150 (1997); Flat Rock ARCA 150 (1998); Jasper Engines & Transmissions 150 (1999, 2000)
- Most wins (driver): Marvin Smith (6)
- Most wins (team): Venturini Motorsports (3)
- Most wins (manufacturer): Oldsmobile (13)

The Jasper Engines & Transmissions 150 was a former ARCA Menards Series race held at the Flat Rock Speedway in Ash Township, Michigan. Frank Kimmel is the final race winner, having won it in 2000.

=== Past winners ===
| Year | Date | Driver | Team | Manufacturer | Race distance | | Race time | Average speed (mph) | Report | Ref |
| Year | Date | Driver | Team | Manufacturer | Laps | Miles (km) | Race time | Average speed (mph) | Report | Ref |
|---|---|---|---|---|---|---|---|---|---|---|
| 1979 | June 9 | Jim Cushman | N/A | Plymouth | 100 | 25 (40.234) | 0:31:07 | 48.385 | Report | |
| 1979 | August 25 | Moose Myers | N/A | Chevrolet | 79 | 19.75 (31.785) | 0:21:21 | 55.547 | Report | |
| 1980 | May 31 | Marvin Smith | N/A | Oldsmobile | 100 | 25 (40.234) | N/A | N/A | Report | |
| 1980 | July 5 | Marvin Smith | N/A | Oldsmobile | 75 | 18.750 (30.175) | 0:18:26 | N/A | Report | |
| 1980 | August 23 | Marvin Smith | N/A | Oldsmobile | 80 | 20 (32.187) | 0:22:21 | 53.708 | Report | |
| 1981 | June 27 | Bob Dotter | N/A | Buick | 75 | 18.750 (30.175) | N/A | N/A | Report | |
| 1981 | June 27 | Marvin Smith | N/A | Oldsmobile | 100 | 25 (40.234) | N/A | N/A | Report | |
| 1981 | August 22 | Marvin Smith | N/A | Oldsmobile | 81 | 20.25 (32.589) | N/A | N/A | Report | |
| 1982 | May 29 | Lee Raymond | N/A | Buick | 100 | 25 (40.234) | N/A | N/A | Report | |
| 1982 | August 11 | Bobby Jacks | N/A | Oldsmobile | 82 | 20.5 (32.992) | N/A | N/A | Report | |
| 1983 | June 18 | Bill Venturini | Venturini Motorsports | Pontiac | 100 | 25 (40.234) | N/A | N/A | Report | |
| 1983 | August 20 | Lee Raymond | W&W Racing | Buick | 83 | 20.75 (33.394) | N/A | N/A | Report | |
| 1984 | June 16 | Bill Venturini | Venturini Motorsports | Chevrolet | 100 | 25 (40.234) | N/A | N/A | Report | |
| 1984 | August 11 | Bill Venturini | Venturini Motorsports | Chevrolet | 84 | 21 (33.796) | N/A | N/A | Report | |
| 1985 | July 13 | Ed Hage | Hage Racing | Oldsmobile | 111* | 28 (45.062) | N/A | N/A | Report | |
| 1986 | June 14 | Ed Hage | Hage Racing | Oldsmobile | 125 | 31.250 (50.292) | 0:36:55 | 50.79 | Report | |
| 1987 | June 27 | Ed Hage | Hage Racing | Oldsmobile | 125 | 31.250 (50.292) | 0:41:33 | 45.806 | Report | |
| 1987 | August 8 | Ed Hage | Hage Racing | Oldsmobile | 130* | 32.5 (52.304) | 0:42:46 | 45.918 | Report | |
| 1988 | May 28 | Bob Keselowski | K Automotive Racing | Chevrolet | 150 | 37.5 (60.35) | 0:48:04 | 46.81 | Report | |
| 1988 | August 13 | Tracy Leslie | Don Biederman | Oldsmobile | 150 | 37.5 (60.35) | 0:45:13 | 49.792 | Report | |
| 1989 | May 27 | Dave Weltmeyer | N/A | Oldsmobile | 150 | 37.5 (60.35) | N/A | N/A | Report | |
| 1989 | August 12 | Grant Adcox | Adcox Racing | Chevrolet | 150 | 37.5 (60.35) | 0:44:53 | 50.13 | Report | |
| 1990 | May 26 | Bobby Bowsher | Jack Bowsher & Associates | Pontiac | 150 | 37.5 (60.35) | 0:49:55 | 45.075 | Report | |
| 1991 | June 1 | Bobby Bowsher | Jack Bowsher & Associates | Pontiac | 163* | 40.75 (65.581) | N/A | N/A | Report | |
| 1991 | June 29 | Bob Keselowski | K Automotive Racing | Pontiac | 150 | 37.5 (60.35) | 0:59:51 | 56.462 | Report | |
| 1992 | June 27 | Dave Weltmeyer | N/A | Pontiac | 150 | 37.5 (60.35) | 0:39:14 | 57.349 | Report | |
| 1992 | August 8 | Dave Weltmeyer | N/A | Pontiac | 150 | 37.5 (60.35) | 0:48:12 | 46.68 | Report | |
| 1993 | May 29 | Harold Fair | N/A | Pontiac | 150 | 37.5 (60.35) | 0:41:22 | 59.392 | Report | |
| 1993 | June 26 | Jeremy Mayfield | Sadler Brothers Racing | Oldsmobile | 150 | 37.5 (60.35) | 0:43:15 | 52.023 | Report | |
| 1994 | May 28 | Gary Bradberry | Bradberry Racing | Buick | 150 | 37.5 (60.35) | 0:36:42 | 61.364 | Report | |
| 1994 | July 23 | Dave Weltmeyer | N/A | Chevrolet | 150 | 37.5 (60.35) | 0:41:46 | 53.071 | Report | |
| 1995 | May 27 | Andy Hillenburg | Fast Track Racing Enterprises | Chevrolet | 150 | 37.5 (60.35) | 0:45:42 | 49.234 | Report | |
| 1995 | July 2 | Marvin Smith | N/A | Chevrolet | 150 | 37.5 (60.35) | 0:41:55 | 53.679 | Report | |
| 1995 | July 22 | Joe Ruttman | Roulo Brothers Racing | Chevrolet | 150 | 37.5 (60.35) | N/A | N/A | Report | |
| 1996 | June 1 | Dave Weltmeyer | N/A | Chevrolet | 150 | 37.5 (60.35) | 0:35:05 | 64.133 | Report | |
| 1996 | July 6 | Tim Steele | Steele Racing | Ford | 150 | 37.5 (60.35) | 0:39:15 | 57.32 | Report | |
| 1997 | July 5 | Tim Steele | Steele Racing | Ford | 150 | 37.5 (60.35) | 0:43:06 | 51.843 | Report | |
| 1998 | August 1 | Frank Kimmel | Clement Racing | Chevrolet | 151* | 37.75 (60.55) | 0:45:18 | 48.966 | Report | |
| 1999 | July 31 | Bill Baird | Ken Schrader Racing | Chevrolet | 150 | 37.5 (60.35) | 0:52:47 | 42.627 | Report | |
| 2000 | May 27 | Frank Kimmel | Clement Racing | Chevrolet | 159* | 39.75 (63.971) | 0:49:36 | 48.08 | Report | |

- 1991, 1998, & 2000: Race extended due to a green-white-checker finish.
- 1985, 1987: Race shortened due to rain.

== ARCA Menards Series East ==
Sunbelt Rentals 150
- Venue: Flat Rock Speedway
- Location: Ash Township, Michigan
- Corporate sponsor: Sunbelt Rentals
- First race: 2023
- Laps: 150
- Previous names: Dutch Boy 150 (2023–2025)
- Most wins (driver): Max Reaves (2)
- Most wins (team): Joe Gibbs Racing (3)
- Most wins (manufacturer): Toyota (3)

The Sunbelt Rentals 150 is an ARCA Menards Series East race held at the Flat Rock Speedway in Ash Township, Michigan. Max Reaves is the defending race winner, having won it in 2026.

=== Past winners ===
| Year | Date | No. | Driver | Team | Manufacturer | Race distance | | Race time | Average speed (mph) | Report | Ref |
| Year | Date | No. | Driver | Team | Manufacturer | Laps | Miles (km) | Race time | Average speed (mph) | Report | Ref |
|---|---|---|---|---|---|---|---|---|---|---|---|
| 2023 | May 20 | 18 | William Sawalich | Joe Gibbs Racing | Toyota | 150 | 37.5 (60.35) | 0:38:48 | 57.99 | Report | |
| 2024 | May 18 | 28 | Connor Zilisch | Pinnacle Racing Group | Chevrolet | 150 | 37.5 (60.35) | 0:37:50 | 59.471 | Report | |
| 2025 | May 17 | 18 | Max Reaves | Joe Gibbs Racing | Toyota | 150 | 37.5 (60.35) | 0:39:33 | 71.04 | Report | |
| 2026 | August 1 | 18 | Max Reaves | Joe Gibbs Racing | Toyota | 150 | 37.5 (60.35) | 0:39:50 | 56.485 | Report | |

| Previous race: LiUNA! 150 | ARCA Menards Series; Sunbelt Rentals 150 | Next race: JR & CO. 150 |
