= Bruce Gould and Beatrice Blackmar Gould =

Co-editors of Ladies' Home Journal magazine

Bruce Gould and Beatrice Blackmar Gould (both 1898–1989) were co-editors of the Ladies' Home Journal for almost 27 years, from 1935 through 1962, including the golden years of the magazine.

== Early life ==
Charles Bruce Gould was born in Luana, Iowa, and went to the college at the University of Iowa. He was in the Navy Flying Corps during World War I. He landed in New York City in 1920s with plans to be a playwright, but landed jobs in journalism, working at The Sun, New York Post, and the Wall Street News. In 1931 he began writing for magazines, and co-wrote many articles with Beatrice.

Beatrice Blackmar was born in Emmetsburg, Iowa, and graduated from the University of Iowa and Columbia School of Journalism. She started her journalism career with the Ottumwa Courier in Iowa in the early 1920s.

Bruce and Beatrice married in 1923. Early in their careers, they wrote two plays together, including Man's Estate which debuted in 1929, and The Terrible Turk in 1934.

== Ladies' Home Journal ==
Bruce joined The Saturday Evening Post as an associate editor in 1934. It was published by Curtis Publishing Company, who also published the Journal. The Goulds took over as co-editors of the Journal in 1935 during the Great Depression, and steered the publication through its golden years, becoming for much of their tenure the highest circulation of the "Seven Sisters" of American magazines that focused on women, and among the highest circulation magazines in the country. Only in 1961, did McCall's eclipse their circulation (7.4 million to 7.2 million for the Journal). Their joint retirement was announced in March 1962.

According to a Time magazine article upon their 1962 retirement, the Goulds took an undistinguished journal in a field that "took the patronizing view that a woman's interests were largely confined to the home" and led by "Beatrice's sure feeling for the emancipated women's tastes, it invited its readers to plunge up to the elbows not only in bread dough but in life." The magazine pushed for "purity in politics as well as in maternity wards" and fought against venereal disease and child abuse. Attention-getting articles and addressing feminine health problems openly were published, as well as top fiction pieces.

The two wrote an autobiography that was published in 1968.

== Deaths ==
Beatrice died of Alzheimer's disease at their home in Hopewell, New Jersey, on January 30, 1989. Bruce died later in the year also at their home, on August 27, 1989, of congestive heart failure.
