= Iggy Katona =

American racing driver (1916–2003)

- Born: Egnatius Katona; August 16, 1916 Toledo, Ohio, U.S.
- Died: December 4, 2003 (aged 87) Daytona Beach, Florida, U.S.
- Retired: 1977

ARCA Series
- Years active: 1953–1977
- Teams: Iggy Katona
- Starts: 312
- Wins: 79
- Poles: 44
- Best finish: 1st in 1955, 1956, 1957, 1962, 1966, 1967

Previous series
- 1951–'52, 1965–'66, 1974: NASCAR Winston Cup Series

Championship titles
- 1955 1956 1957 1962 1966 1967: MARC Champion; MARC Champion; MARC Champion; MARC Champion; ARCA Series Champion; ARCA Series Champion

Awards
- 1982: Michigan Motor Sports Hall of Fame
- Achievements: 1965, 1971, 1974 Daytona ARCA 200 Winner; Finished top ten in ARCA Racing Series point standings for 21 consecutive seasons (1953–1973); The only driver ever to win a 600-lap race on a half-mile oval (Dayton Speedway)

NASCAR Cup Series career
- 13 races run over 5 years
- Best finish: 33rd (1952)
- First race: 1951 Motor City 250 (Detroit)
- Last race: 1974 Winston 500 (Talladega)
Wins	Top tens	Poles
0	3	0

NASCAR Grand National East Series career
- 3 races run over 1 year
- First race: 1973 Toledo 100 (Toledo)
- Last race: 1973 Mt. Clemens 100 (Mt. Clemens)
Wins	Top tens	Poles
0	2	0
- Statistics up to date as of April 28, 2013.

Egnatius "Iggy" Katona (August 16, 1916 – December 4, 2003) was an American stock car racing driver from Willis, Michigan. He is most famous for his performance in the ARCA series in the 1950s, 1960s, and 1970s, where he won six championships and 79 races, both of which stood as series records until Frank Kimmel surpassed both; first in 2005 for championships and then in 2013 for wins. Other ARCA records held by Katona include most starts (630), oldest race winner (57 years old, Daytona International Speedway, 1974) and most consecutive seasons with a win (19, from 1953–1971)

== Early career ==
Katona started out racing motorcycles in local races in Michigan and Ohio at age 21, winning nearly every race he entered.

After a brief tour of duty in the Army during World War II, Katona turned to midget car racing. Building his own engines and chassis and with his two sons Ronnie and Jim as crew members, Katona found success on four wheels as well, including winning 14 feature races in a row at Detroit's famed Motor City Speedway dirt oval.

== MARC/ARCA career ==
In 1952, fellow Toledoan John Marcum created his Midwest Association for Race Cars as a Northern counterpart to the Southern stock car series of the day, Bill France Sr.'s NASCAR. Katona was a force in the series from the beginning, finishing third in the series' inaugural campaign in 1953, second in 1954, and winning the championship in 1955, 1956, and 1957. His fourth MARC championship came in 1962 driving his No. 30 Ford.

Although he developed his racing skills on the short tracks of the Midwest, Katona adapted well when the MARC changed its name to ARCA and began racing on superspeedways in 1964, winning the ARCA race at Daytona three times. He won his fifth and sixth titles in 1966 and, at the age of 51, 1967. His consistency was his biggest asset, as he finished in the top-ten in series points in 21 straight seasons from 1953–73.

Sporting positions
Preceded by Jack Bowsher	ARCA Series Champion; 1966–1967	Succeeded by Benny Parsons
Preceded by Harold Smith	MARC Champion; 1962	Succeeded by Jack Bowsher
Preceded by Buckie Sager	MARC Champion; 1955–1957	Succeeded by Nelson Stacy
