= Jack Bowsher =

American racing driver

- Born: October 2, 1930 Harmony, Ohio, U.S.
- Died: April 8, 2006 (aged 75)
- Retired: 1989
- Relatives: Bobby Bowsher (son); Todd Bowsher (son); Jimmy Bowsher (son)

ARCA Permatex Super Car Series
- Years active: 1957–1966, 1989
- Teams: Jack Bowsher
- Starts: 97
- Wins: 56
- Poles: 11
- Best finish: 1st in 1963, 1964, 1965

Previous series
- 1959, 1966–1979 1966–1967 1954–1955 1954–1955: USAC Stock Car; NASCAR Winston Cup Series; NASCAR Sportsman Division; NASCAR Modified Series

Championship titles
- 1963 1964 1965: MARC Champion; ARCA Racing Series Champion; ARCA Racing Series Champion

NASCAR Cup Series career
- 4 races run over 2 years
- First race: 1966 National 500 (Charlotte)
- Last race: 1967 American 500 (Rockingham)
Wins	Top tens	Poles
0	0	0
- Statistics up to date as of May 3, 2013.

Jack Edward Bowsher (October 2, 1930 – April 8, 2006) was an American race car driver and car owner. He obtained more than ten national championships in his 58-year racing career, including three ARCA Championships. He is also the father of two-time ARCA Champion Bobby Bowsher.

== Early life ==
Jack Edward Bowsher was born on October 2, 1930, in Harmony, Ohio. He graduated from Plattsburg High School in 1948 and served a year in the Navy in 1949.

== Career ==
Bowsher began his racing career in 1949 after attending his first race. In 1953, he joined the newly sanctioned ARCA Series. In 1963, Bowsher accumulated 16 wins on his way to win his first ARCA Title. Bowsher went on to win the championship the next two years. In 1971, Bowsher competed in the USAC Stock Car Series, finishing second in the series standings. He accumulated 21 wins in the series. As an owner, Bowsher won five ARCA titles (three while driving for himself and two with his son Bobby driving). He also won a USAC Title in 1968 with A. J. Foyt driving. Bowsher and Foyt were among the first drivers to test stock cars at the Indianapolis Motor Speedway in the late 1960s. Bowsher's Ford won the 1976 24 Hours of Daytona in the stock car class.

Bowsher was the first person to build a down-tube open-wheel modified race car, which became a standard in modern open-wheel racing. In 1988, Bowsher returned to the ARCA series as an owner for his son Bobby. The father son-duo produced 17 victories on the way to two national titles.

In 1989, a month shy of his 59th birthday, Bowsher, who had not driven in a decade, reluctantly stepped out of retirement subbing for defending ARCA champion Tracy Leslie on the Springfield Mile Dirt Oval where he won the pole and finished tenth in the race on the lead lap. His other son Todd is currently prevalent in the ARCA Series.

== Death ==
On April 8, 2006, Bowsher died. He is survived by wife Julie Bowsher, and sons Jack Bowsher, Jr., Gary Bowsher, Jim Bowsher, Bobby Bowsher, Todd Bowsher and daughter Jodie Bowsher.

Sporting positions
Preceded by Iggy Katona	MARC/ARCA Series champion 1963–1965	Succeeded by Iggy Katona
