= Ken Schrader Racing =

American stock car racing team

- Owner: Ken Schrader
- Base: Concord, North Carolina
- Series: ARCA Menards Series
- Manufacturer: Ford
- Opened: 1987
- Closed: 2020

Career
- Debut: NASCAR Cup Series: 1990 AC Spark Plug 500 (Pocono); NASCAR Xfinity Series: 1987 AC-Delco 200 (Rockingham); NASCAR Gander RV & Outdoors Truck Series: 1995 Skoal Bandit Copper World Classic (Phoenix); ARCA Menards Series: 1989 Daytona ARCA 200 (Daytona)
- Latest race: Xfinity Series: 2002 O'Reilly 300 (Texas); Truck Series: 2015 Mudsummer Classic (Eldora); ARCA Menards Series: 2019 Southern Illinois 100 (DuQuoin)
- Races competed: Total: 627; Cup Series: 1 Xfinity Series: 92; Truck Series: 173; ARCA Menards Series: 361
- Drivers' Championships: ARCA Menards Series: 2 (1999, 2017)
- Race victories: Total: 38; Cup Series: 0 Xfinity Series: 2 Truck Series: 1 ARCA Menards Series: 35
- Pole positions: Total: 39; Cup Series: 0 Xfinity Series: 1 Truck Series: 4 ARCA Menards Series: 34

Ken Schrader Racing (KSR) was an American professional stock car racing team that last competed part-time in the ARCA Menards Series, fielding the No. 52 for Natalie Decker. The team was owned by longtime NASCAR driver Ken Schrader. Over the years, Schrader has also fielded his team in the NASCAR Cup, Xfinity, and Truck Series in addition to in ARCA.

== NASCAR Xfinity and Cup Series ==
=== Beginnings ===
Schrader began fielding his own team in 1987 in the then-Busch Series, driving the No. 45 Red Baron Pizza Ford Thunderbird at North Carolina Speedway. Qualifying 21st, he finished fifth, one lap down. He switched to the No. 52 and Chevrolets in 1988 and picked up sponsorship from Exxon. Running ten races, he had two top-fives and finished 32nd in points. In 1989, he made twelve races and picked up his first win in the Busch Series at Dover, and ran with Kodiak sponsorship in 1990. During the 1990 season, his team ran its first Winston Cup race when Brian Ross drove the No. 58 Pontiac at Pocono Raceway, finishing 27th after suffering an engine failure. Schrader would change his number to 15 in 1991, and had four top-five finishes.

AC Delco became the new team sponsor in 1992, and Schrader finished 29th in points, a career-best for him in the Busch Series. He switched back to the No. 52 in 1993, winning the pole at the season opening race, but had three top-tens, his lowest total since 1990. In 1994, he won his most recent race at Talladega Superspeedway, and had two other top-fives. After the 1995 season, the team retired from the Busch Series.

== NASCAR Craftsman Truck Series ==
Schrader began fielding trucks during the series' inaugural season in 1995. Driving the No. 52 Chevrolet Silverado with an AC Delco sponsorship, he made seven starts and won at Saugus Speedway. He ran three races in his truck in 1996, sharing the ride with Tobey Butler, who won the pole at Evergreen Speedway. Schrader Racing also ran a pair of Cup races, with Jack Sprague driving the No. 52 Pedigree Petfoods-sponsored Pontiac Grand Prix, his best finish being 23rd at Phoenix.

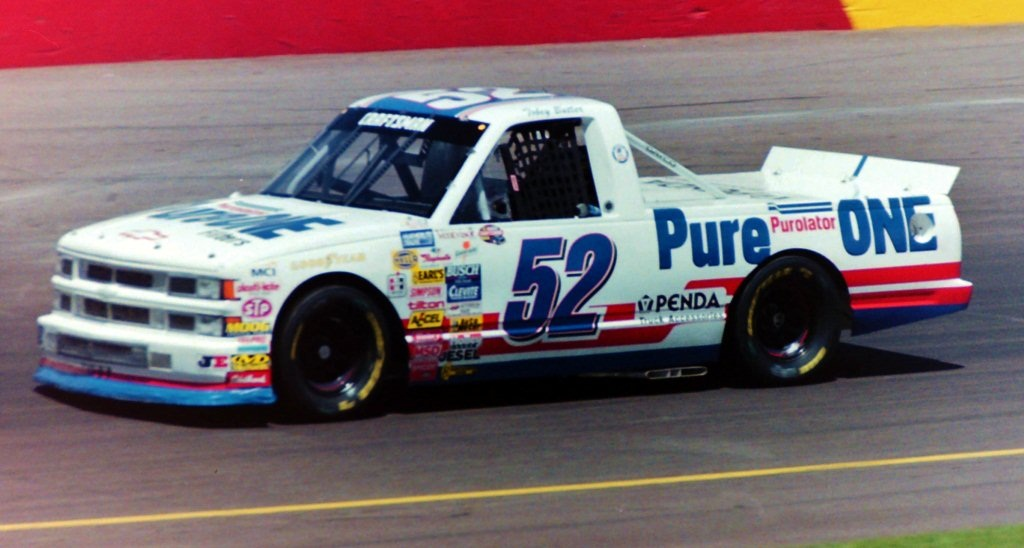
Tobey Butler Schrader Racing Chevrolet 1997

Butler was hired as the team's full-time driver in 1997, with Purolator becoming the team's new sponsor. After eleven races, he was replaced by Mike Wallace, who had a second-place finish at California Speedway. Schrader himself ran a second entry, the No. 53 Penda Truck Accessories-sponsored Chevy, at Richmond International Raceway, finishing sixth. Wallace drove exclusively for Schrader in 1998, posting eleven top-tens. He would leave for Ultra Motorsports at the end of the season, and Purolator ended its sponsorship in NASCAR.

Rookie Scott Hansen was tabbed as the new driver of the 52, and Oakwood Homes became the team's new sponsor. Hansen qualified for every race and had three top-tens when Schrader replaced him in the final race of the year, where he crashed out. Hansen still finished second in the NASCAR Rookie of the Year standings and eighteenth in points. The 52 team went back to part-time racing after picking up a Federated Auto Parts sponsorship in 2000, with Schrader sharing the ride with Lyndon Amick, who had a second-place run at Indianapolis Raceway Park. Schrader and Amick continued to run part-time in 2001, with Schrader himself posting a second-place finish at Darlington Raceway. During 2001 and 2002, KSR ran in the Busch Series again in the No. 07 Chevy with Schrader attempting a total of three races, and Michael Vergers failing to qualify in his attempt. In 2002, Wallace returned to the team as co-driver, replacing Amick. The two would combine for twelve starts and five top-ten finishes. Schrader ran eleven races in 2003, and Wallace four, with four top-tens. Wallace began the 2004 season with a third-place finish, before Schrader took over for the rest of the runs for the years. He had four top-tens and a pole at Bristol Motor Speedway. He made nine more starts in 2005, but had only one top-ten finish.

=== Hiatus and return ===
KSR did not run any Truck Series races over the next two seasons, focusing on the ARCA series, fielding entries for Chris Bristol. The team returned in 2008, when Schrader returned with Federated Auto Parts sponsoring his Toyota Tundra. In his first race back, he started 28th and finished fourth.

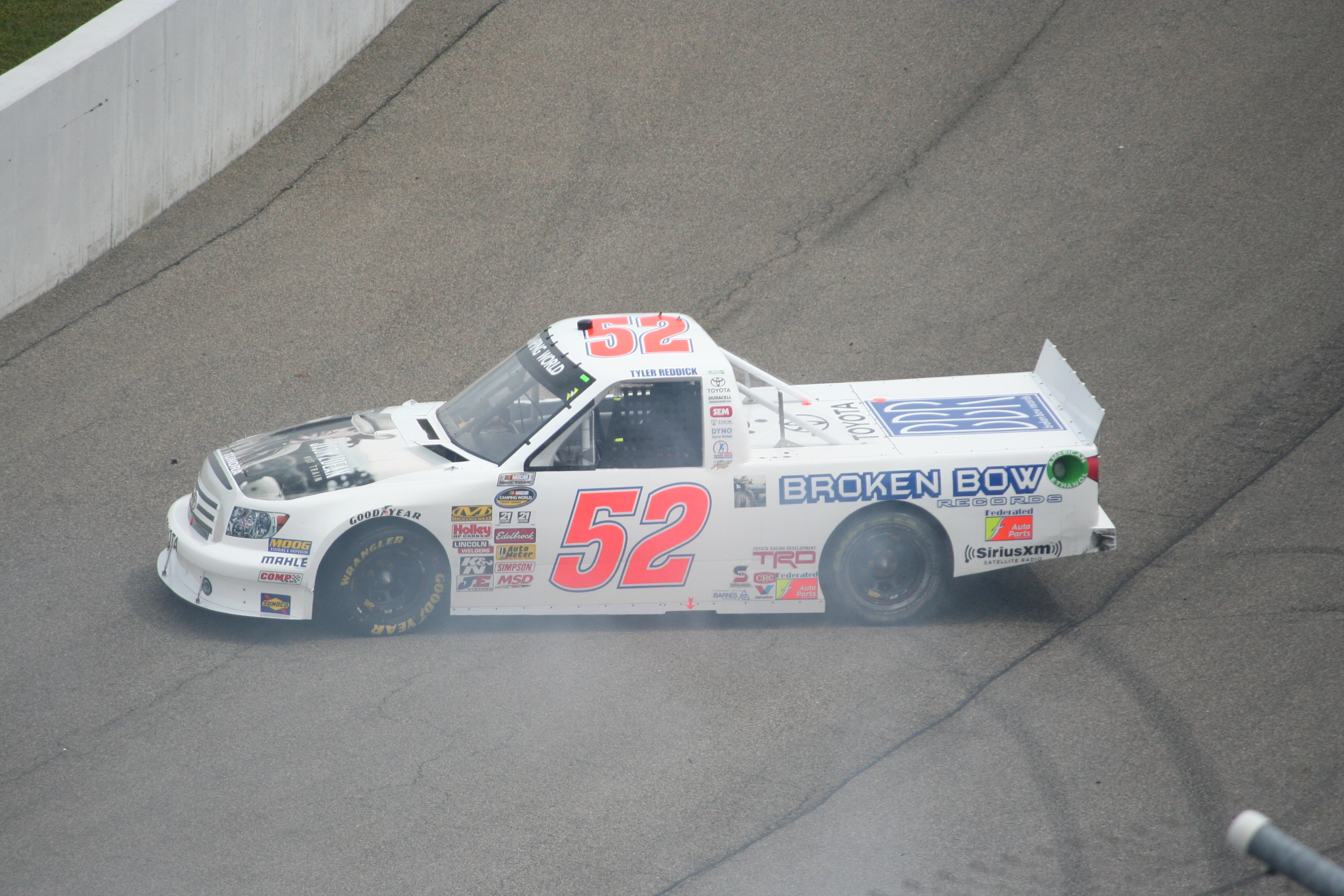
Tyler Reddick, seen here spinning out, drove for the team in one race at Rockingham in 2013.

The team returned once again in 2013 at the inaugural Mudsummer Classic at Eldora Speedway, with Schrader winning the pole position, becoming the oldest pole-sitter in NASCAR history. Schrader returned in his No. 52 in both 2014 and 2015 for the races at Eldora, which were the only NASCAR events he and his team competed in. In 2016, Schrader drove the No. 71 Toyota Tundra at Eldora's race in a partnership between his own team and Contreras Motorsports so he had a better chance of qualifying with the large entry lists the series was seeing that year.

== ARCA Menards Series ==
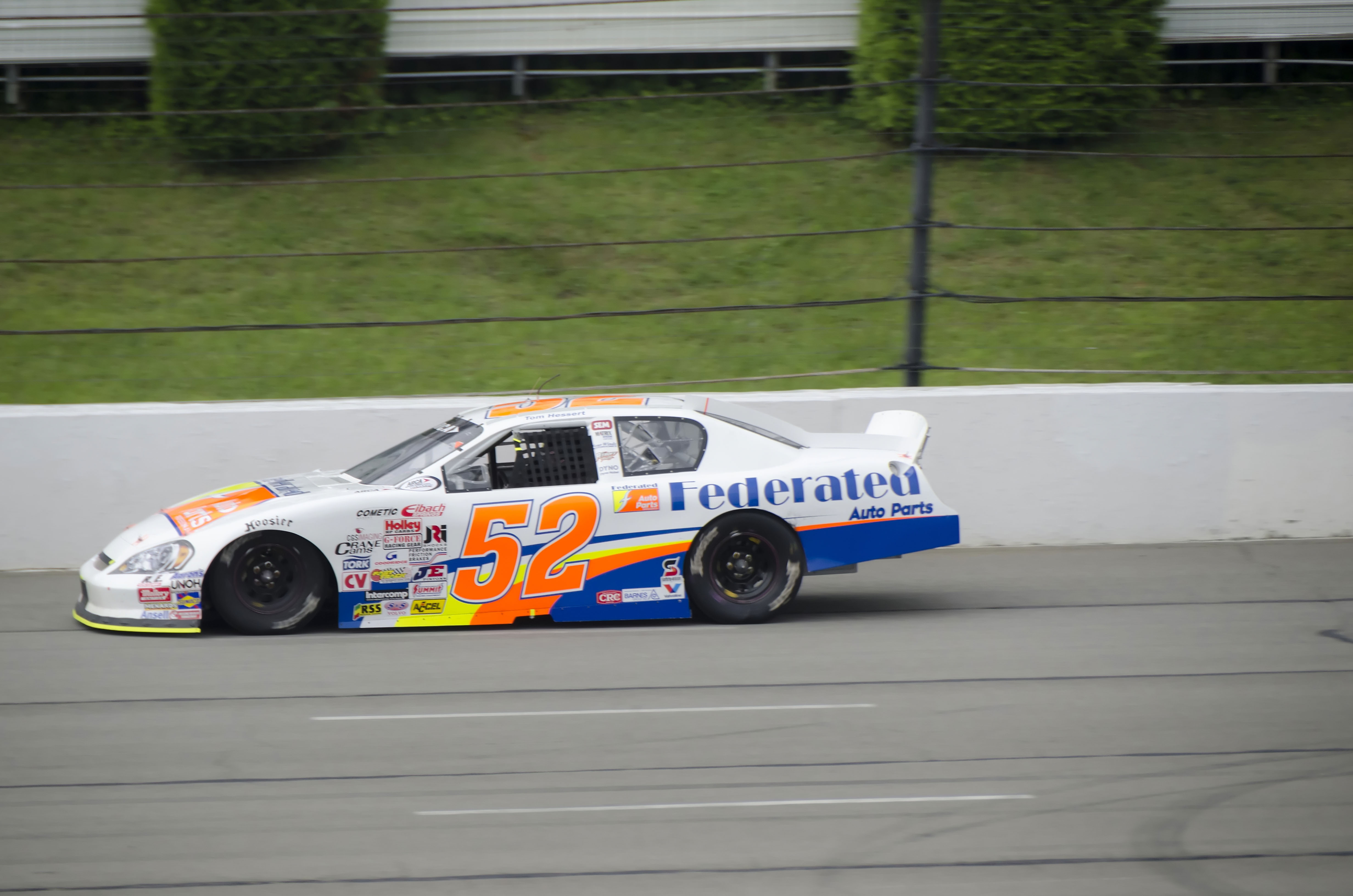
Tom Hessert drove for the team in both 2011 and 2012 in between separate stints at Cunningham Motorsports. Here, he is seen racing at the second Pocono race in 2011.

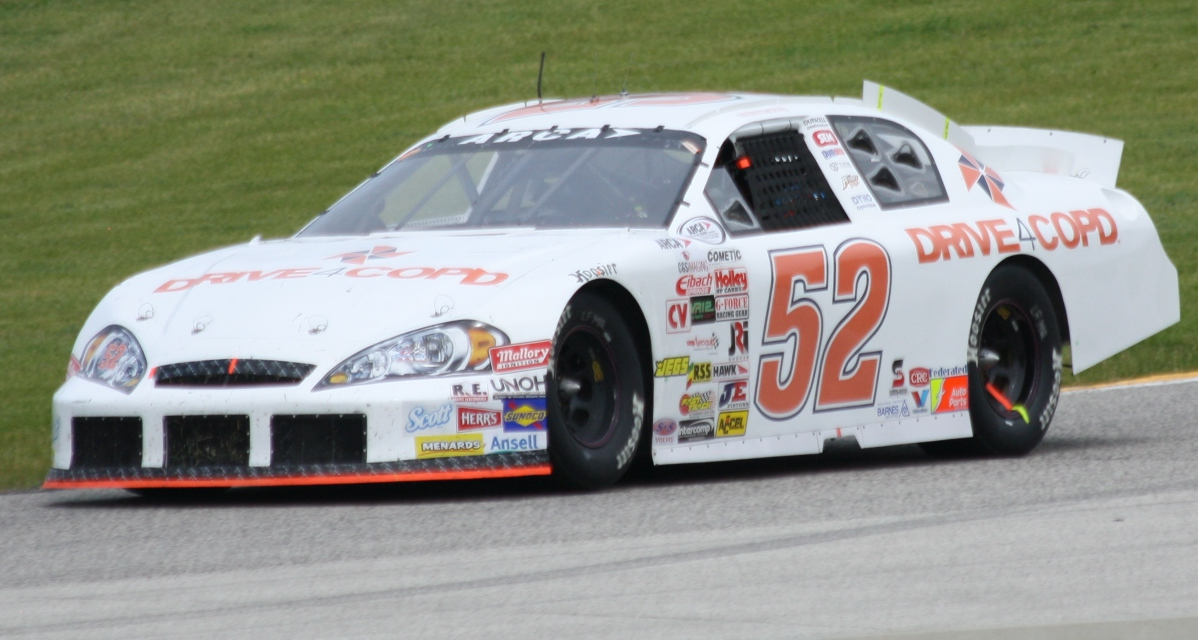
The team ran multiple drivers in 2013, including Austin Dillon at Road America, pictured here.

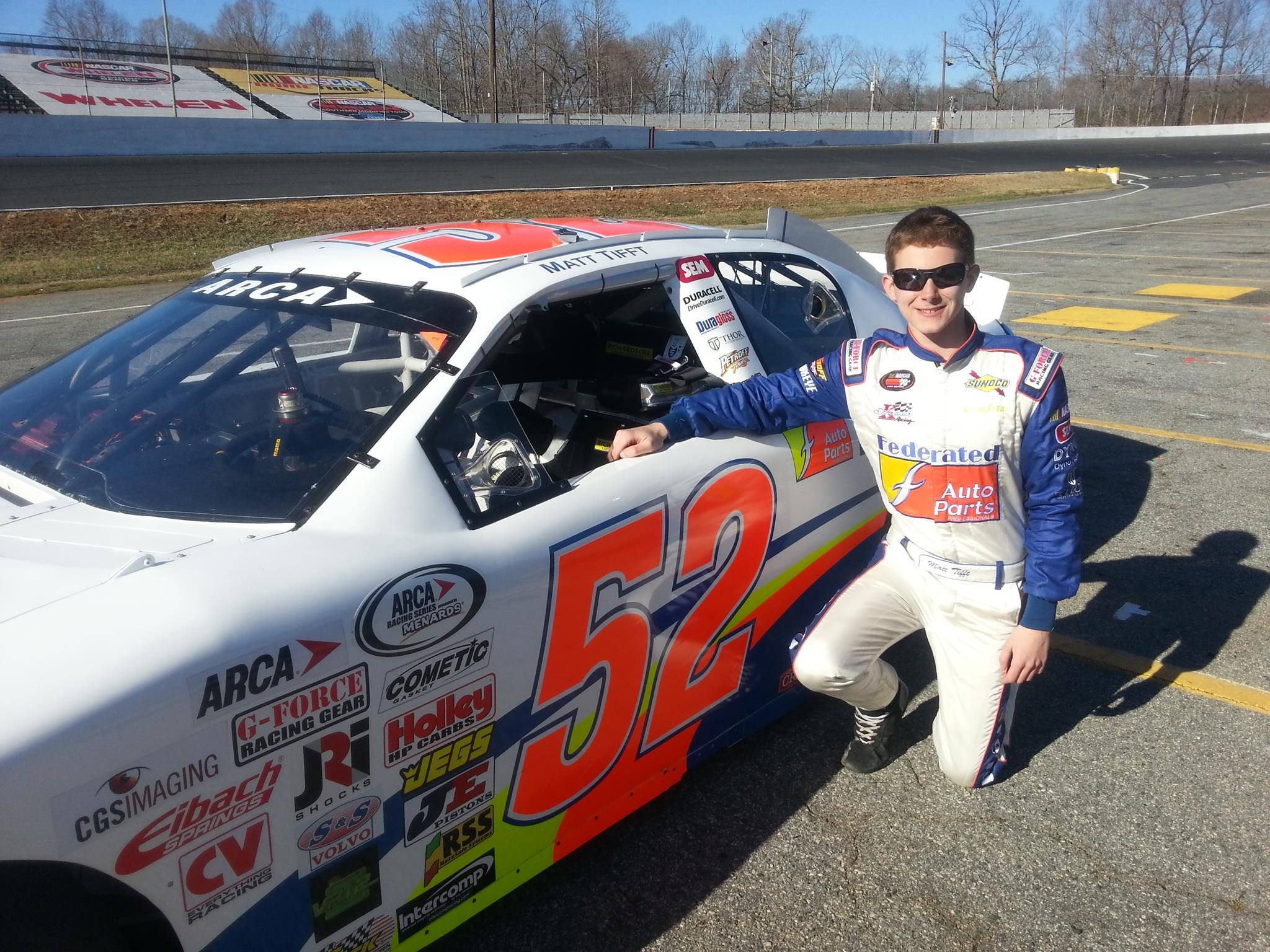
Matt Tifft drove Schrader's No. 52 in ARCA part-time in 2014

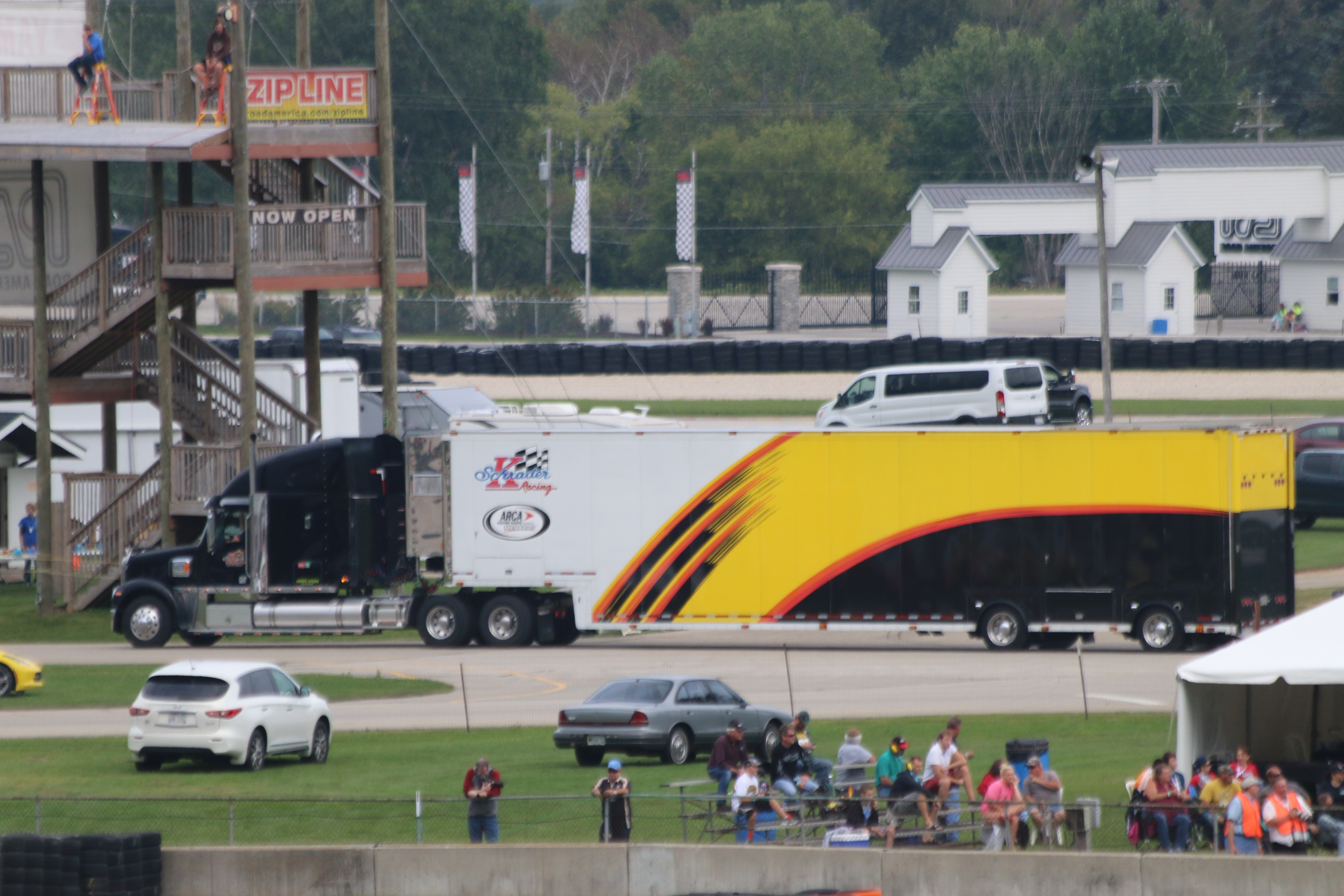
The Ken Schrader Racing hauler driving through the infield at Road America. Notice that it still has the Menards design from 2016 only with the logos taken off.

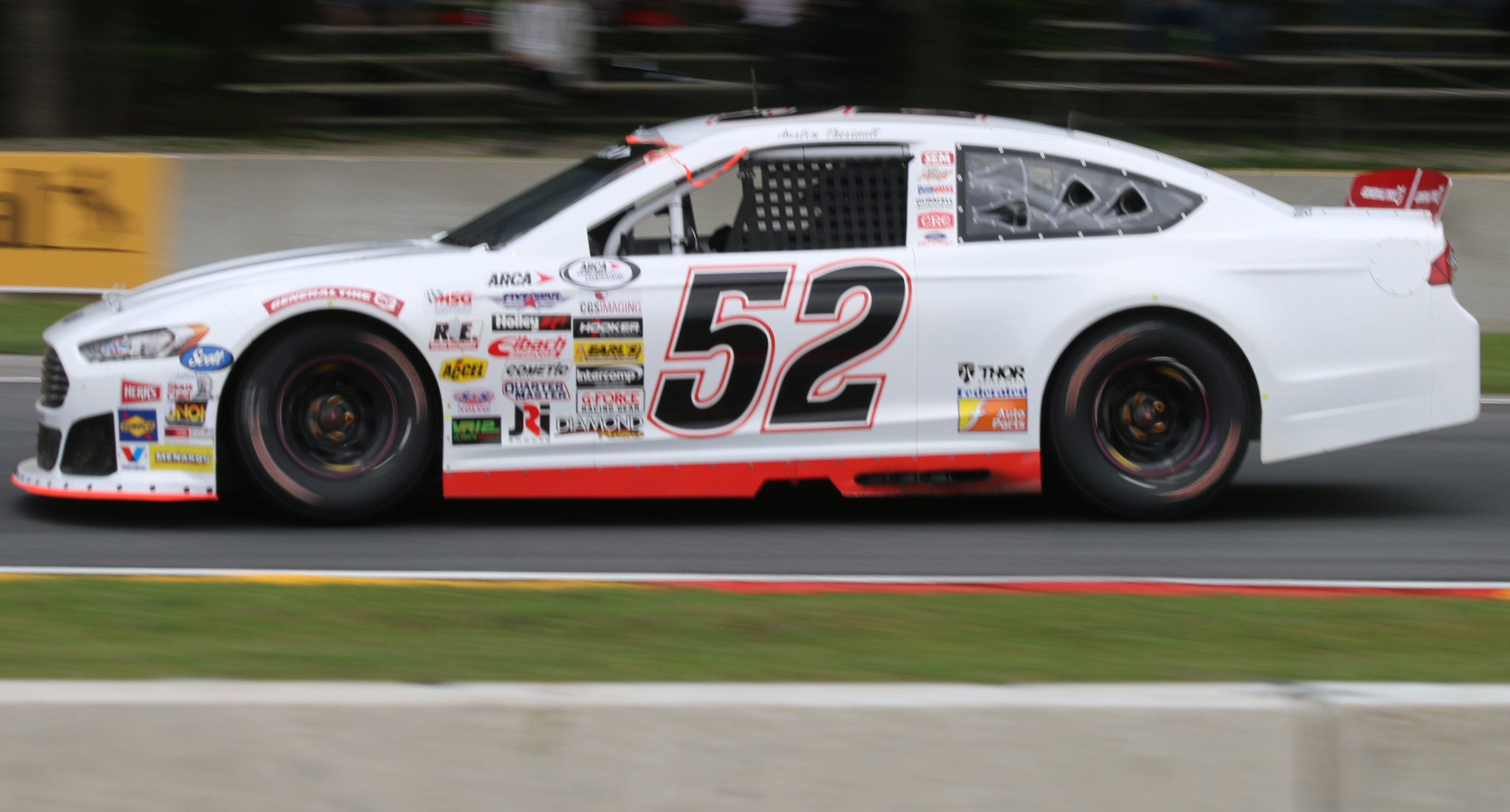
Austin Theriault driving his unsponsored No. 52 car at Road America in his championship-winning 2017 season.

For 2016, the No. 52 team ran with one driver for the full season for the first time in over three years, with Matt Kurzejewski joining the team after getting many good finishes driving part-time for his own team for a few years. Despite not winning any races, he earned a third place finish in points. Also, they picked up sponsorship from Menards (as well as Ansell), which moved over to KSR after sponsoring Frank Kimmel since 2009. They replaced Federated Auto Parts as the team's full season sponsor.

The team ran the full ARCA Racing Series schedule in 2017 with Austin Theriault. However, Menards did not return in 2017, and they were only able to find sponsors race-by-race. The team scored seven wins en route to the championship, which Theriault and the team clinched in the penultimate race at Kentucky. The team struggled with finding sponsorship both that year and in 2018, and as a result, the team only guaranteed Theriault to run the car at the 2018 season opener at Daytona. However, weeks before the start of the season, those plans changed as the team signed up-and-comer Will Rodgers to drive for KSR part-time, starting at Daytona and then in a second car with sponsorship from Drydene. He had previously driven for KSR at ARCA's testing at Daytona in January 2018. Because Rodgers brought a sponsor and Theriault did not, Theriault was left without a ride. At the same time, they announced that Brandon Grosso would attempt to run all the races for them after Daytona (where he was still only 17 and not eligible to run there). Grosso was eventually released during the season, and Rodgers moved from the No. 11 car (which Schrader fielded in a collaboration with Fast Track Racing) to the team's primary car, the No. 52, for his remaining starts.

After his own team was also struggling financially, Bret Holmes did not field his own No. 23 car at the race at Iowa and drove Schrader's No. 52 instead for that race along with two others. In 2019, the team only ran two races, at Daytona with Tyler Dippel and DuQuoin with Schrader himself.

For 2020, Schrader's team partnered with late model team Fury Race Cars to jointly field Fury's driver Natalie Decker in the No. 52 at Daytona in preparation for her start in the Truck Series race there driving for Niece Motorsports. This was not Fury's first time running a stock-car team, as they fielded a part-time Xfinity Series team in 2018.

On December 8, 2020, Schrader confirmed that he would be closing down his longtime ARCA team and only keep its dirt racing operations in 2021. This made it the first season since 1990 where KSR did not compete in the series. Schrader's iconic No. 52 car only competed part-time from 2018 to 2020 due to lack of sponsorship.
