= Joe Ruttman =

American racing driver (born 1944)

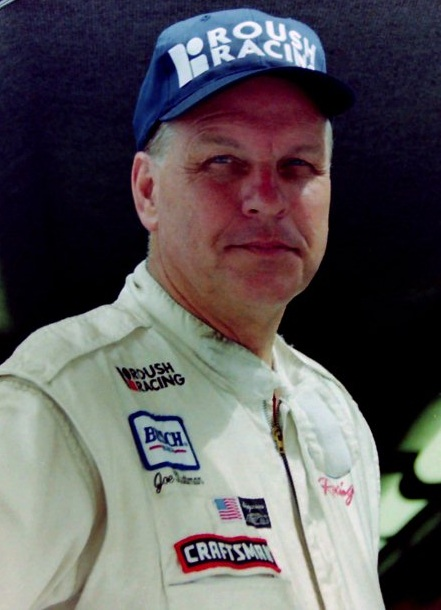
- Ruttman in 1996
- Born: October 28, 1944 (age 82); Upland, California, U.S.
- Achievements: 1980 USAC Stock Car Champion; 1969, 1973 Glass City 200 Winner; 1985 Cracker 200 Winner
- Awards: 1978 USAC Stock Car Rookie of the Year; West Coast Stock Car Hall of Fame (2011)

NASCAR Cup Series career
- 255 races run over 20 years
- Best finish: 12th (1983)
- First race: 1963 Riverside 500 (Riverside)
- Last race: 2004 MBNA America 400 (Dover)
Wins	Top tens	Poles
0	60	3

NASCAR O'Reilly Auto Parts Series career
- 21 races run over 8 years
- Best finish: 41st (1985)
- First race: 1982 Sportsman 200 (Dover)
- Last race: 2005 Aaron's 312 (Talladega)
- First win: 1982 Sportsman 200 (Dover)
Wins	Top tens	Poles
1	5	0

NASCAR FedEx Freight Truck Series career
- 172 races run over 9 years
- Best finish: 2nd (1995)
- First race: 1995 Skoal Bandit Copper World Classic (Phoenix)
- Last race: 2007 Missouri-Illinois Dodge Dealers Ram Tough 200 (Gateway)
- First win: 1995 Pizza Plus 150 (Bristol)
- Last win: 2001 Jelly Belly 200 (Pikes Peak)
Wins	Top tens	Poles
13	111	17

Raymond Joseph Ruttman (born October 28, 1944) is an American former stock car racing driver who competed in NASCAR's Sprint Cup Series, Nationwide Series, and Camping World Truck Series. With thirteen career wins in the Truck Series, he is currently tied for thirteenth on the all-time wins list with Mike Bliss (as of October 13, 2021). He is the younger brother of Troy Ruttman.

== USAC Stock Cars ==
Ruttman was the United States Automobile Club's 1978 USAC Stock Car Rookie of the Year, and the 1980 USAC Series champion.

== NASCAR ==
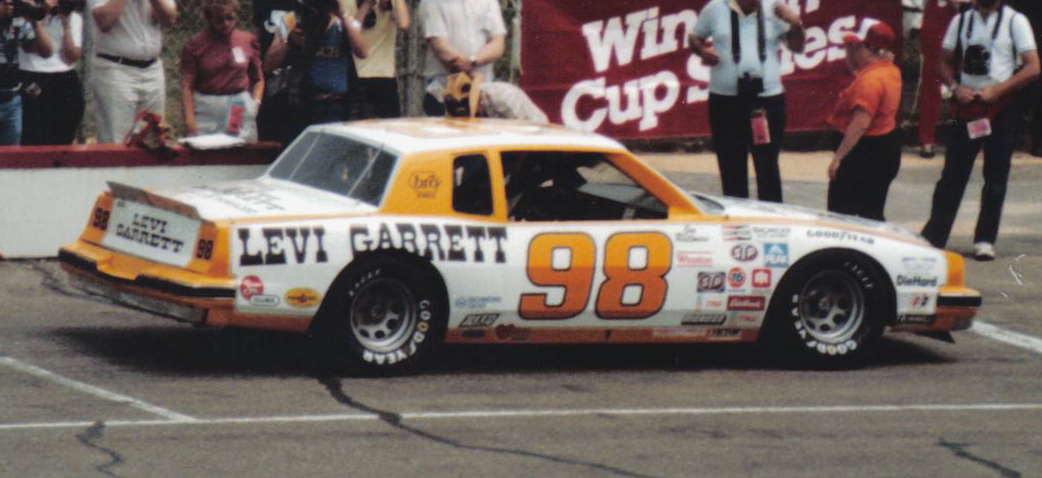
Ruttman's 1983 NASCAR Cup car

Ruttman made his NASCAR Grand National Series (now known as the NASCAR Cup Series) debut in 1963 at Riverside International Raceway, finishing tenth at the Winston Western 500. He drove in three more Series races between 1964 and 1980, while racing local tracks in between. Ruttman caught a big break in 1981 when J.D. Stacy, who had just bought Rod Osterlund's team, hired him to take over for Dale Earnhardt, who left the team mid-season to join Richard Childress Racing. Ruttman went on to run a full Series schedule from 1982 through 1984, 1986, and 1991. His best season was in 1983, when he finished twelfth in points. During his twenty years in the Sprint Cup Series he had sixty top-ten finishes and nineteen top-fives. He came very close to winning a race at Richmond in 1982, but a late power-steering failure sent his car into the wall and gave Dave Marcis the victory. He also picked up a runner-up finish at the same track, finishing five seconds behind Kyle Petty in 1986, although, had Ruttman not been collected in a final-lap accident, he would have actually won.

In 1995, Ruttman competed in the inaugural NASCAR SuperTrucks Series (now known as the Craftsman Truck Series), where he would finally reach his potential. He would dominate the middle of the season, winning two races that year on his way to finishing second in the championship. His success as a full-time driver in the Truck Series continued as he went on to win eleven more races between 1996 and 2007. He won his last race at the age of 56, making him the oldest race winner in any NASCAR division.

At Rockingham in 2004, Ruttman made his first Cup Series start since 1995, driving a one-off race for Phoenix Racing. However, it was a controversial "start-and-park" run. Ruttman contributed to an ongoing controversy by not showing up with a pit crew, and only coming to collect a small share of the prize money. Ruttman was ordered off the track by NASCAR after one lap and team owner James Finch was admonished by officials. At the time, there was a controversy over unqualified "field-fillers" being in the race and led to changes in the NASCAR rulebook.

== Personal life ==
Born in Upland, California, Ruttman is a resident of North Port, Florida. He is the younger brother of Indianapolis 500 winner Troy Ruttman. His father, Ralph "Butch" Ruttman, was an award-winning mechanic on top Indy teams.

== Motorsports career results ==
=== NASCAR ===
(key) (Bold – Pole position awarded by qualifying time. Italics – Pole position earned by points standings or practice time. * – Most laps led.)

==== Grand National Series ====
NASCAR Grand National Series results
Year	Team	No.	Make	1	2	3	4	5	6	7	8	9	10	11	12	13	14	15	16	17	18	19	20	21	22	23	24	25	26	27	28	29	30	31	32	33	34	35	36	37	38	39	40	41	42	43	44	45	46	47	48	49	50	51	52	53	54	55	56	57	58	59	60	61	62	NGNC	Pts	Ref
1963	Carl Dane	98	Mercury	BIR	GGS	THS	RSD; 10	DAY	DAY	DAY	PIF	AWS	HBO	ATL	HCY	BRI	AUG	RCH	GPS	SBO	BGS	MAR	NWS	CLB	THS	DAR	ODS	RCH	CLT	BIR	ATL	DAY	MBS	SVH	DTS	BGS	ASH	OBS	BRR	BRI	GPS	NSV	CLB	AWS	PIF	BGS	ONA	DAR	HCY	RCH	MAR	DTS	NWS	THS	CLT	SBO	HBO	RSD								56th	1584	
1964	Troy Ruttman	1W	Mercury	CON	AUG	JAC	SAV	RSD; 34	DAY	DAY	DAY	RCH	BRI	GPS	BGS	ATL	ASW	HBO	PIF	CLB	NWS	MAR	SAV	DAR	LGY	HCY	SBO	CLT	GPS	ASH	ATL	CON	NSV	CHT	BIR	VAL	PIF	DAY	ODS	OBS	BRR	ISP	GLN	LIN	BRI	NSV	MBS	ASW	DTS	ONA	CLB	BGS	STR	DAR	HCY	RCH	ODS	HBO	MAR	SAV	NWS	CLT	HAR	AUG	JAC	127th	100	

==== Nextel Cup Series ====
NASCAR Nextel Cup Series results
Year	Team	No.	Make	1	2	3	4	5	6	7	8	9	10	11	12	13	14	15	16	17	18	19	20	21	22	23	24	25	26	27	28	29	30	31	32	33	34	35	36	NNCC	Pts	Ref
1977	Robert Switzer	25	Ford	RSD	DAY	RCH	CAR	ATL	NWS	DAR	BRI	MAR	TAL	NSV	DOV	CLT	RSD	MCH	DAY	NSV	POC	TAL	MCH	BRI	DAR	RCH	DOV	MAR	NWS	CLT	CAR	ATL	ONT; 13							85th	124	
1980	Jim Stacy Racing	5	Olds	RSD	DAY	RCH	CAR	ATL	BRI	DAR	NWS	MAR	TAL	NSV	DOV	CLT	TWS	RSD	MCH	DAY	NSV	POC	TAL	MCH	BRI	DAR	RCH	DOV	NWS	MAR	CLT	CAR	ATL	ONT; 40						NA	0	
1981	Jim Stacy Racing	6	Buick	RSD	DAY	RCH	CAR	ATL; 10	BRI	NWS	DAR	MAR	TAL; 29	NSV	DOV	CLT; 7	TWS; 9	RSD	MCH	DAY; 29	NSV	POC	TAL; 22																	28th	1851	
1981	Jim Stacy Racing	2	Pontiac																					MCH; 6	BRI; 21	DAR; 15	RCH; 30	DOV; 6		NWS; 26		CAR; 5								28th	1851	
1981	Jim Stacy Racing	2	Buick																										MAR; 17		CLT; 19		ATL; 25	RSD; 2						28th	1851	
1982	Jim Stacy Racing	2	Buick	DAY; 3	RCH; 15	BRI; 18	ATL; 29	CAR; 24	DAR																															16th	3021	
1982	RahMoc Enterprises	75	Buick							NWS; 12	MAR; 14		NSV; 4		CLT; 41	POC; 30		MCH; 13	DAY; 40	NSV; 12	POC; 7	TAL; 11	MCH; 38	BRI; 24	DAR; 13	RCH; 31	DOV; 18	NWS; 6	CLT; 4	MAR; 5	CAR; 18	ATL; 5								16th	3021	
1982	RahMoc Enterprises	75	Pontiac									TAL; 22		DOV; 18			RSD; 26																							16th	3021	
1982	Ranier-Lundy Racing	28	Pontiac																														RSD; 40							16th	3021	
1983	Benfield Racing	98	Chevy	DAY; 4*							TAL; 11				CLT; 14				DAY; 37			TAL; 15	MCH; 24							CLT; 13										12th	3342	
1983	Benfield Racing	98	Buick		RCH; 7*	CAR; 29	ATL; 4	DAR; 20	NWS; 7	MAR; 4		NSV; 7	**DOV**; 3			RSD; 34		MCH; 33			POC; 9							MAR; 7	NWS; 14											12th	3342	
1983	Benfield Racing	98	Pontiac											BRI; 23			POC; 10			NSV; 22				**BRI**; 18	DAR; 38	RCH; 27	DOV; 20				CAR; 30	ATL; 30	RSD; 41							12th	3342	
1984	Benfield Racing	98	Chevy	DAY; 28	RCH; 10	CAR; 17	ATL; 28	BRI; 10	NWS; 30	DAR; 19	**MAR**; 6	TAL; 21			CLT; 41	RSD; 7	POC; 11	MCH; 8	DAY; 10	NSV; 8	POC; 14	TAL; 37	MCH; 20	BRI; 29	DAR; 13	RCH; 30	DOV; 33	MAR; 29												18th	2945	
1984	Benfield Racing	98	Buick										NSV; 15																											18th	2945	
1984	Benfield Racing	98	Pontiac											DOV; 14																										18th	2945	
1984	Barkdoll Racing	38	Chevy																										CLT; 40	NWS										18th	2945	
1984	Morgan-McClure Motorsports	4	Chevy																												CAR; 34	ATL; 35	RSD; 10							18th	2945	
1985	Morgan-McClure Motorsports	4	Chevy	DAY; 17	RCH	CAR; 6	ATL; 26	BRI; 29	DAR; 11	NWS	MAR	TAL; 30	DOV	CLT; 7	RSD	POC; 35	MCH	DAY; 35	POC	TAL; 33	MCH	BRI; 13	DAR; 9	RCH	DOV; 33	MAR	NWS	CLT; 5	CAR; 40	ATL; 32	RSD									30th	1410	
1986	King Racing	26	Buick	DAY; 28	RCH; 2	CAR; 33	ATL; 42	BRI; 19	DAR; 21	NWS; 5	MAR; 2	TAL; 17	DOV; 11	CLT; 32	RSD; 42	POC; 7	MCH; 9	DAY; 7	POC; 38	TAL; 8	GLN; 33	MCH; 30	BRI; 17	DAR; 38	RCH; 6	DOV; 6	MAR; 5	NWS; 6	CLT; 25	CAR; 9	ATL; 9	RSD; 5								15th	3295	
1987	Ball Motorsports	99	Chevy	DAY	CAR	RCH	ATL	DAR	NWS	BRI	MAR	TAL; 36	CLT	DOV	POC	RSD	MCH	DAY	POC	TAL	GLN	MCH	BRI	DAR	RCH	DOV	MAR	NWS	CLT											NA	0	
1987	RahMoc Enterprises	75	Pontiac																											CAR; 10	RSD; 7	ATL; 11								NA	0	
1988	Bob Clark Motorsports	31	Olds	DAY	RCH	CAR	ATL	DAR	BRI	NWS	MAR	TAL	CLT; 20	DOV; 30	RSD; 29	POC; 17	MCH; 16	DAY; 11	POC; 27	TAL; 42	GLN; 9	MCH	BRI	DAR	RCH	DOV	MAR													39th	803	
1988	Barkdoll Racing	73	Chevy																									CLT; 35	NWS											39th	803	
1988	Winkle Motorsports	97	Buick																											CAR; 38										39th	803	
1988	Barkdoll Racing	73	Ford																												PHO; 41	ATL								39th	803	
1989	CalCar Motorsports	45	Pontiac	DAY; 13	CAR	ATL	RCH	DAR	BRI	NWS	MAR	TAL	CLT	DOV																										43rd	469	
1989	Baker-Schiff Racing	88	Olds												SON; 6	POC	MCH	DAY																						43rd	469	
1989	Douglas Smith Racing	62	Olds																POC; 34					DAR; 30	RCH	DOV	MAR	CLT	NWS	CAR; 27										43rd	469	
1989	Speed Racing	83	Olds																	TAL; 31	GLN	MCH; 21	BRI; 31																	43rd	469	
1989	Reno Enterprises	40	Chevy																												PHO; 20	ATL								43rd	469	
1990	CalCar Motorsports	32	Pontiac	DAY; 26	RCH	CAR	ATL	DAR	BRI	NWS	MAR	TAL	CLT	DOV	SON	POC	MCH	DAY	POC	TAL	GLN	MCH	BRI	DAR	RCH	DOV	MAR	NWS	CLT	CAR	PHO	ATL								81st	85	
1991	RahMoc Enterprises	75	Olds	DAY; 3	RCH; 29	CAR; 24	ATL; 27	DAR; 26	BRI; 13	NWS; 24	MAR; 16	TAL; 29	CLT; 21	DOV; 12	SON; 31	POC; 22	MCH; 19	DAY; 31	POC; 10	TAL; 10	GLN; 14		BRI; 17		RCH; 28	DOV; 13	MAR; 31		CLT; 16	CAR; 27	PHO; 22									20th	2938	
1991	RahMoc Enterprises	75	Chevy																			MCH; 30		DAR; 9				NWS; 29				ATL; 20								20th	2938	
1992	Moroso Racing	20	Olds	DAY	CAR	RCH	ATL	DAR	BRI	NWS	MAR	TAL	CLT; 35	DOV	SON	POC	MCH	DAY	POC	TAL	GLN	MCH	BRI	DAR	RCH	DOV	MAR	NWS	CLT	CAR	PHO	ATL								84th	58	
1993	Moroso Racing	20	Ford	DAY; 38	CAR	RCH	ATL; 38	DAR	BRI; 19	NWS	MAR	TAL; 5	SON	CLT; 35	DOV	POC	MCH	DAY	NHA	POC	TAL	GLN	MCH	BRI	DAR	RCH	DOV	MAR	NWS	CLT	CAR	PHO	ATL							43rd	417	
1994	Melling Racing	9	Ford	DAY; 18	CAR	RCH	ATL	DAR	BRI	NWS	MAR	TAL	SON	CLT	DOV	POC	MCH																							54th	203	
1994	Hover Motorsports	80	Ford															DAY; DNQ	NHA	POC	TAL; DNQ						RCH; DNQ	DOV	MAR	NWS	CLT; 23	CAR	PHO	ATL; DNQ						54th	203	
1994	Roulo Brothers Racing	39	Chevy																			IND; DNQ	GLN	MCH	BRI	DAR														54th	203	
1995	Hover Motorsports	80	Ford	DAY; 19	CAR	RCH	ATL	DAR	BRI	NWS	MAR	TAL	SON	CLT	DOV	POC	MCH	DAY	NHA	POC	TAL	IND; DNQ	GLN	MCH																56th	106	
1995	Sadler Brothers Racing	95	Ford																						BRI; DNQ	DAR	RCH	DOV	MAR	NWS	CLT	CAR	PHO	ATL						56th	106	
1996	Hover Motorsports	80	Ford	DAY; DNQ	CAR	RCH	ATL	DAR	BRI	NWS	MAR	TAL	SON	CLT	DOV	POC	MCH	DAY	NHA	POC	TAL	IND	GLN	MCH	BRI	DAR	RCH	DOV	MAR	NWS	CLT	CAR	PHO	ATL						NA	-	
2004	Phoenix Racing	09	Dodge	DAY	CAR; 43	LVS	ATL; 43	DAR; 43	BRI; 42	TEX	MAR; 43	TAL	CAL; 43	RCH	CLT	DOV	POC	MCH	SON	DAY	CHI	NHA	POC	IND	GLN	MCH	BRI	CAL	RCH	NHA	DOV; 41	TAL	KAN	CLT	MAR	ATL	PHO	DAR	HOM	60th	247	

===== Daytona 500 =====
Year	Team	Manufacturer	Start	Finish
1982	Jim Stacy Racing	Buick	8	3
1983	Benfield Racing	Chevrolet	11	4
1984	Benfield Racing	Chevrolet	31	28
1985	Morgan-McClure Motorsports	Chevrolet	32	17
1986	King Racing	Buick	40	28
1989	CalCar Motorsports	Pontiac	17	13
1990	CalCar Motorsports	Pontiac	27	26
1991	RahMoc Enterprises	Oldsmobile	14	3
1993	Moroso Racing	Ford	36	38
1994	Melling Racing	Ford	34	18
1995	Hover Motorsports	Ford	27	19
1996	Hover Motorsports	Ford	DNQ	

==== Nationwide Series ====
NASCAR Nationwide Series results
Year	Team	No.	Make	1	2	3	4	5	6	7	8	9	10	11	12	13	14	15	16	17	18	19	20	21	22	23	24	25	26	27	28	29	30	31	32	33	34	35	NNSC	Pts	Ref
1982	Butch Mock Motorsports	75	Pontiac	DAY	RCH	BRI	MAR	DAR	HCY	SBO	CRW	RCH	LGY	DOV; 1	HCY	CLT; 32	ASH	HCY	SBO	CAR	CRW	SBO	HCY	LGY	IRP	BRI	HCY	RCH	MAR	CLT; DNQ	HCY	MAR							88th	247	
1983	Whitaker Racing	82	Pontiac	DAY; 8	RCH	CAR	HCY	MAR	NWS	SBO	GPS	LGY	DOV	BRI																									71st	288	
1983	Whitaker Racing	98	Pontiac												CLT; 7	SBO	HCY	ROU	SBO	ROU	CRW	ROU	SBO	HCY	LGY	IRP	GPS	BRI	HCY	DAR	RCH	NWS	SBO	MAR	ROU	CLT	HCY	MAR	71st	288	
1984	Whitaker Racing	98	Olds	DAY	RCH	CAR	HCY	MAR	DAR	ROU	NSV	LGY	MLW	DOV	CLT	SBO	HCY	ROU	SBO	ROU	HCY	IRP	LGY	SBO	BRI	DAR	RCH	NWS	CLT; 39	HCY	CAR	MAR							98th	46	
1985	Whitaker Racing	7	Olds	DAY; 40	CAR; 2	HCY	BRI; 20	MAR	DAR; 34	SBO	LGY	DOV; 7	CLT; 27	SBO	HCY	ROU	IRP	SBO	LGY	HCY	MLW		DAR; 26	RCH	NWS	ROU	CLT	HCY	CAR	MAR									41st	520	
1985	Whitaker Racing	7	Pontiac																			BRI; 25																	41st	520	
1993	Moroso Racing	20	Chevy	DAY; 38	CAR	RCH	DAR	BRI; 33	HCY	ROU	MAR	NZH	CLT; 13	DOV	MYB	GLN	MLW	TAL	IRP	MCH	NHA	BRI	DAR	RCH	DOV	ROU	CLT	MAR	CAR	HCY	ATL								63rd	237	
1996	Phoenix Racing	4	Chevy	DAY	CAR	RCH	ATL	NSV	DAR	BRI	HCY	NZH	CLT	DOV	SBO	MYB	GLN	MLW; QL^{†}	NHA	TAL	IRP	MCH	BRI	DAR	RCH	DOV	CLT	CAR	HOM										NA	-	
2001	Phoenix Racing	1	Chevy	DAY	CAR	LVS	ATL	DAR	BRI	TEX	NSH	TAL	CAL	RCH	NHA	NZH	CLT	DOV	KEN; 33	MLW; 38	GLN	CHI	GTY	PPR; 21	IRP	MCH	BRI	DAR	RCH	DOV	KAN	CLT	MEM	PHO	CAR	HOM			78th	213	
2002	Phoenix Racing	51	Pontiac	DAY	CAR	LVS	DAR	BRI	TEX	NSH	TAL; 36	CAL	RCH	NHA	NZH	CLT	DOV	NSH	KEN	MLW	DAY	CHI	GTY	PPR	IRP	MCH	BRI	DAR	RCH	DOV	KAN	CLT	MEM	ATL	CAR	PHO	HOM		NA	0	
2005	Sadler Brothers Racing	95	Dodge	DAY	CAL	MXC	LVS	ATL	NSH	BRI	TEX	PHO	TAL; 24	DAR	RCH	CLT	DOV	NSH	KEN	MLW	DAY	CHI	NHA	PPR	GTY	IRP	GLN	MCH	BRI	CAL	RCH	DOV	KAN	CLT	MEM	TEX	PHO	HOM	114th	91	
2009	E.O.C. Motorsports	71	Chevy	DAY	CAL	LVS	BRI; Wth	TEX	NSH	PHO	TAL	RCH	DAR	CLT	DOV	NSH	KEN	MLW	NHA	DAY	CHI	GTY; DNQ	IRP; DNQ	IOW	GLN	MCH	BRI	CGV	ATL	RCH	DOV	KAN	CAL	CLT	MEM	TEX	PHO	HOM	NA	-	
^{†} - Qualified for Jeff Purvis

==== Craftsman Truck Series ====
NASCAR Craftsman Truck Series results
Year	Team	No.	Make	1	2	3	4	5	6	7	8	9	10	11	12	13	14	15	16	17	18	19	20	21	22	23	24	25	26	27	NCTSC	Pts	Ref
1995	Irvan-Simo Racing	84	Ford	PHO; 8	TUS; 4	SGS; 13	MMR; 8	POR; 2	EVG; 2	I70; 4	LVL; 2	BRI; 1	MLW; 6	CNS; 6	HPT; 2	IRP; 6	**FLM**; 7	RCH; 4	MAR; 1	NWS; 6	SON; 12	MMR; 5	PHO; 8								2nd	3098	
1996	Roush Racing	80	Ford	HOM; 19	PHO; 7	POR; 9	EVG; 8	TUS; 15	CNS; 6	HPT; 23	BRI; 6	NZH; 7	MLW; 17	LVL; 5	I70; 20	IRP; 22	FLM; 27	GLN; 6	NSV; 13	RCH; 4	NHA; 8	MAR; 6	NWS; 5	SON; 4	MMR; 3	PHO; 3	LVS; 3				4th	3275	
1997	Roush Racing	80	Ford	WDW; 1	TUS; 28	**HOM**; 26	PHO; 2	POR; 13	EVG; 4	I70; 6	NHA; 9	TEX; 9	BRI; 5	NZH; 2	MLW; 9	LVL; 2	CNS; 12	**HPT**; 1	IRP; 4	FLM; 2	NSV; 19	GLN; 4	RCH; 12	MAR; 12	SON; 1	MMR; 19	CAL; 29	PHO; 1	LVS; 1		3rd	3736	
1998	Roush Racing	50	Ford	WDW; 2																											3rd	3874	
1998	Roush Racing	99	Ford		HOM; 22	PHO; 7	POR; 9	**EVG**; 12	I70; 2	GLN; 1	TEX; 3	BRI; 3	MLW; 7	NZH; 5	CAL; 11	PPR; 3	IRP; 3	NHA; 3	FLM; 4	NSV; 24	HPT; 9	LVL; 27	**RCH**; 4	MEM; 4	GTY; 18	MAR; 21	SON; 4	MMR; 13	PHO; 4	LVS; 7	3rd	3874	
1999	Ultra Motorsports	12	Ford	HOM; 33																											21st	2275	
1999	SealMaster Racing	8	Chevy		PHO; 34	EVG	MMR																								21st	2275	
1999	Wauters Motorsports	15	Ford					MAR; 13	MEM	PPR	I70	BRI																			21st	2275	
1999	Bobby Hamilton Racing	18	Dodge										TEX; 11	PIR; 10	GLN; 25	MLW; 15	NSV; 4	NZH; 22	MCH; 5	NHA; 25	IRP; 10	GTY; 7	HPT; 7	RCH; 29	LVS; 23	LVL; 10	TEX; 7	CAL; 2			21st	2275	
2000	Bobby Hamilton Racing	18	Dodge	**DAY**; 19	**HOM**; 4	**PHO**; 1*	MMR; 16	MAR; 6	PIR; 12	GTY; 5	MEM; 19	PPR; 22	**EVG**; 3	TEX; 26	KEN; 25	GLN; 15	MLW; 24	**NHA**; 12	**NZH**; 2*	MCH; 14	**IRP**; 1*	NSV; 4	**CIC**; 1	RCH; 4	DOV; 17	TEX; 11	CAL; 3				6th	3278	
2001	Bobby Hamilton Racing	18	Dodge	**DAY**; 1*	HOM; 9	MMR; 6	**MAR**; 4	GTY; 12	DAR; 5	PPR; 1	DOV; 8	TEX; 4	MEM; 3	MLW; 6	KAN; 24	KEN; 2	NHA; 8	**IRP**; 3	NSH; 4	**CIC**; 8	NZH; 9	RCH; 9	SBO; 5	TEX; 9	LVS; 8	PHO; 12	CAL; 16				3rd	3570	
2002	RDS Motorsports	79	Dodge	DAY; 4																											40th	465	
2002	Rosenblum Racing	28	Chevy		DAR; 35	MAR	GTY	PPR	DOV	TEX	MEM	MLW	KAN	KEN	NHA	MCH	IRP														40th	465	
2002	Petty Enterprises	45	Dodge															NSH; 17	RCH												40th	465	
2002	Bobby Hamilton Racing	4	Dodge																	TEX; 11	SBO	LVS	CAL	PHO	HOM						40th	465	
2007	Bobby Hamilton Racing	18	Dodge	DAY	CAL	ATL	MAR	KAN; 25	CLT	MFD	DOV																				77th	170	
2007	Bobby Hamilton Racing	4	Dodge									TEX; 27	MCH	MLW	MEM	KEN	IRP														77th	170	
2007	Bobby Hamilton Racing	04	Dodge															NSH; 33	BRI	GTY; 35	NHA	LVS	TAL								77th	170	
2007	Jim Blankenbaker	53	Dodge																					MAR; DNQ	ATL	TEX	PHO	HOM			77th	170	

=== ARCA Re/Max Series ===
(key) (Bold – Pole position awarded by qualifying time. Italics – Pole position earned by points standings or practice time. * – Most laps led.)

ARCA Re/Max Series results
Year	Team	No.	Make	1	2	3	4	5	6	7	8	9	10	11	12	13	14	15	16	17	18	19	20	21	22	23	24	25	26	27	28	29	30	31	32	ARMC	Pts	Ref
1967		23	Ford	DSP	DAY	DAY	DAY	AUS	PAS	CCS	HOU	FMS	NKS	TOL	NSV	ACS	LCF	SLM	ELD	BFS	MLL	BAR	AND; 8	CMS	BFS	SSP	FMS	KMS	CCF	SLM	ACS	TOL	DSP	CMS	KMS	NA	0	
1972		33		SLM	DAY	FMS	WIN	I70	SLM	QCS	LCF	ELD	IRP	NBS	WIN	TOL	SHA	SLM	FMS	TOL; 2	CCF	FRS	QCS	NBS												NA	0	
1980	Speedway Engineering	70	Pontiac	DAY	NWS	FRS	FRS	**MCH**; 1*	TAL	IMS	FRS	MCH																								NA	0	
1981	Joe Ruttman	5	Pontiac	DAY; 2	DSP	FRS	FRS	BFS																												11th	395	
1981		59	Olds						TAL; 2	FRS	COR																									11th	395	
1982	Jim Stacy Racing	9	Olds	NSV	DAY; 1*	TAL	FRS	CMS	WIN	NSV	TAT	TAL	FRS	BFS	MIL	SND																				NA	0	
1994	Roulo Brothers Racing	39	Chevy	DAY	TAL	FIF	LVL	KIL	TOL	FRS	MCH	DMS	POC	POC	KIL	FRS	INF	I70	ISF	DSF; 21	TOL	SLM	WIN	ATL												139th	-	
1995	Roulo Brothers Racing	39	Chevy	DAY; 4	ATL	TAL	FIF	KIL	FRS	MCH; 5	I80	MCS	FRS	POC; 29	POC	KIL; 26	**FRS**; 1*	SBS	LVL	ISF	**DSF**; 30	SLM	WIN	ATL												32nd	1050	
1999	Roulo Brothers Racing	39	Chevy	DAY; 39	ATL	SLM	AND	CLT	MCH	POC	TOL	SBS	BLN	POC	KIL	FRS	FLM	ISF	WIN	DSF	SLM	CLT	TAL	ATL												143rd	35	
2003	Roulo Brothers Racing	39	Ford	DAY	ATL	NSH	SLM	TOL	KEN	CLT	BLN	KAN	MCH	LER	POC	POC	NSH	ISF	WIN	DSF	CHI; 19	SLM	TAL	CLT	SBO											144th	135	

Sporting positions
Preceded by A. J. Foyt	USAC Stock Car Champion; 1980	Succeeded by Dean Roper
