= 1986 Miller High Life 500 =

13th race of the 1986 NASCAR Winston Cup Series

Race details
- Race 13 of 29 in the 1986 NASCAR Winston Cup Series
- The 1986 Miller High Life 500 program cover, featuring Buddy Baker.
- Date: June 8, 1986
- Official name: 5th Annual Miller High Life 500
- Location: Long Pond, Pennsylvania, Pocono International Raceway
- Course: Permanent racing facility
- Course length: 4.0 km (2.5 miles)
- Distance: 200 laps, 500 mi (804.672 km)
- Scheduled distance: 200 laps, 500 mi (804.672 km)
- Average speed: 113.279 miles per hour (182.305 km/h)
- Attendance: 50,000

Pole position
Driver	Geoff Bodine	Hendrick Motorsports
- Time: 58.584

Most laps led
Driver	Tim Richmond	Hendrick Motorsports
- Laps: 97

Winner
No. 25	Tim Richmond	Hendrick Motorsports

Television in the United States
- Network: SETN
- Announcers: Mike Joy, Jerry Punch

Radio in the United States
- Radio: Motor Racing Network

The 1986 Miller High Life 500 was the 13th stock car race of the 1986 NASCAR Winston Cup Series and the fifth iteration of the event. The race was held on Sunday, June 8, 1986, before an audience of 50,000 in Long Pond, Pennsylvania, at Pocono International Raceway, a 2.5 miles (4.0 km) triangular permanent course. The race took the scheduled 200 laps to complete.

In the final laps of the race, Hendrick Motorsports' Tim Richmond gambled on fuel strategy, opting to run the final 36 laps under one tank of fuel. With four laps left, a crash involving several drivers, incliudng Buddy Arrington, Geoff Bodine, and Morgan Shepherd occurred. Due to a lengthy cleanup, the race finished under caution, securing Richmond's sixth career NASCAR Winston Cup Series victory and his first victory of the season. To fill out the top three, Richard Childress Racing's Dale Earnhardt and Ranier-Lundy Racing's Cale Yarborough finished second and third, respectively.

== Background ==
The layout of Pocono International Raceway, the venue where the race was held.

The race was held at Pocono International Raceway, which is a three-turn superspeedway located in Long Pond, Pennsylvania. The track hosts two annual NASCAR Sprint Cup Series races, as well as one Xfinity Series and Camping World Truck Series event. Until 2019, the track also hosted an IndyCar Series race.

Pocono International Raceway is one of a very few NASCAR tracks not owned by either Speedway Motorsports, Inc. or International Speedway Corporation. It is operated by the Igdalsky siblings Brandon, Nicholas, and sister Ashley, and cousins Joseph IV and Chase Mattioli, all of whom are third-generation members of the family-owned Mattco Inc, started by Joseph II and Rose Mattioli.

Outside of the NASCAR races, the track is used throughout the year by the Sports Car Club of America (SCCA) and motorcycle clubs as well as racing schools and an IndyCar race. The triangular oval also has three separate infield sections of racetrack – North Course, East Course and South Course. Each of these infield sections use a separate portion of the tri-oval to complete the track. During regular non-race weekends, multiple clubs can use the track by running on different infield sections. Also some of the infield sections can be run in either direction, or multiple infield sections can be put together – such as running the North Course and the South Course and using the tri-oval to connect the two.

=== Entry list ===
- (R) denotes rookie driver.

#	Driver	Team	Make	Sponsor
3	Dale Earnhardt	Richard Childress Racing	Chevrolet	Wrangler
5	Geoff Bodine	Hendrick Motorsports	Chevrolet	Levi Garrett
6	D. K. Ulrich	U.S. Racing	Chevrolet	U.S. Racing
7	Kyle Petty	Wood Brothers Racing	Ford	7-Eleven
07	Randy LaJoie	Snellman Racing	Chevrolet	Snellman Construction
8	Bobby Hillin Jr.	Stavola Brothers Racing	Chevrolet	Miller American
9	Bill Elliott	Melling Racing	Ford	Coors
11	Darrell Waltrip	Junior Johnson & Associates	Chevrolet	Budweiser
12	Neil Bonnett	Junior Johnson & Associates	Chevrolet	Budweiser
15	Ricky Rudd	Bud Moore Engineering	Ford	Motorcraft Quality Parts
17	Pancho Carter	Hamby Racing	Chevrolet	Kmart
18	Tommy Ellis	Freedlander Motorsports	Chevrolet	Freedlander Financial
20	Rick Newsom	Newsom Racing	Buick	Newsom Racing
22	Bobby Allison	Stavola Brothers Racing	Buick	Miller American
23	Michael Waltrip (R)	Bahari Racing	Pontiac	Hawaiian Punch
24	Buddie Boys	Crawford Clements Racing	Pontiac	Crawford Clements Racing
25	Tim Richmond	Hendrick Motorsports	Chevrolet	Folgers
26	Joe Ruttman	King Racing	Buick	Quaker State
27	Rusty Wallace	Blue Max Racing	Pontiac	Alugard
28	Cale Yarborough	Ranier-Lundy Racing	Ford	Hardee's
33	Harry Gant	Mach 1 Racing	Chevrolet	Skoal Bandit
43	Richard Petty	Petty Enterprises	Pontiac	STP
44	Terry Labonte	Hagan Enterprises	Oldsmobile	Piedmont Airlines
47	Morgan Shepherd	Race Hill Farm Team	Chevrolet	Race Hill Farm Team
48	Jerry Cranmer	Hylton Motorsports	Chevrolet	Hylton Motorsports
52	Jimmy Means	Jimmy Means Racing	Pontiac	Jimmy Means Racing
55	Benny Parsons	Jackson Bros. Motorsports	Oldsmobile	Copenhagen
64	Eddie Bierschwale	Langley Racing	Ford	Sunny King Ford
66	Phil Parsons	Jackson Bros. Motorsports	Oldsmobile	Skoal
67	Buddy Arrington	Arrington Racing	Ford	Pannill Sweatshirts
70	J. D. McDuffie	McDuffie Racing	Pontiac	Rumple Furniture
71	Dave Marcis	Marcis Auto Racing	Pontiac	Helen Rae Special
74	Jack Ely	Wawak Racing	Chevrolet	Wawak Racing
75	Jody Ridley	RahMoc Enterprises	Pontiac	Nationwise Automotive
76	Jerry Ward	Arrington Racing	Ford	Arrington Racing
81	Chet Fillip (R)	Fillip Racing	Ford	Circle Bar Truck Corral
85	Bobby Gerhart	Bobby Gerhart Racing	Chevrolet	Bobby Gerhart Racing
88	Buddy Baker	Baker–Schiff Racing	Oldsmobile	Crisco
90	Ken Schrader	Donlavey Racing	Ford	Red Baron Frozen Pizza
92	Jonathan Lee Edwards	Edwards Racing	Buick	Edwards Racing
98	Ron Bouchard	Curb Racing	Pontiac	Valvoline

== Qualifying ==
Qualifying was split into two rounds. The first round was held on Saturday, June 7, at 10:00 AM EST. Each driver had one lap to set a time. During the first round, the top 20 drivers in the round were guaranteed a starting spot in the race. If a driver was not able to guarantee a spot in the first round, they had the option to scrub their time from the first round and try and run a faster lap time in a second round qualifying run, held on Saturday, at 3:00 PM EST. As with the first round, each driver had one lap to set a time. For this specific race, positions 21-40 were decided on time, and depending on who needed it, a select amount of positions were given to cars who had not otherwise qualified but were high enough in owner's points; up to two were given.

Geoff Bodine, driving for Hendrick Motorsports, won the pole, setting a time of 58.584 and an average speed of 153.625 miles per hour (247.235 km/h) in the first round.

Jerry Ward, a United States Air Force lieutenant colonel and chaplain, was the only driver that failed to qualify.

=== Full qualifying results ===
Pos.	#	Driver	Team	Make	Time	Speed
1	5	Geoff Bodine	Hendrick Motorsports	Chevrolet	58.584	153.625
2	55	Benny Parsons	Jackson Bros. Motorsports	Oldsmobile	58.729	153.246
3	25	Tim Richmond	Hendrick Motorsports	Chevrolet	58.840	152.957
4	33	Harry Gant	Mach 1 Racing	Chevrolet	58.871	152.877
5	12	Neil Bonnett	Junior Johnson & Associates	Chevrolet	58.935	152.711
6	44	Terry Labonte	Hagan Enterprises	Oldsmobile	58.975	152.607
7	27	Rusty Wallace	Blue Max Racing	Pontiac	58.988	152.573
8	3	Dale Earnhardt	Richard Childress Racing	Chevrolet	59.062	152.382
9	11	Darrell Waltrip	Junior Johnson & Associates	Chevrolet	59.102	152.176
10	28	Cale Yarborough	Cale Yarborough Motorsports	Ford	59.169	152.107
11	9	Bill Elliott	Melling Racing	Ford	59.194	152.042
12	22	Bobby Allison	Stavola Brothers Racing	Buick	59.270	151.847
13	43	Richard Petty	Petty Enterprises	Pontiac	59.271	151.845
14	15	Ricky Rudd	Bud Moore Engineering	Ford	59.295	151.783
15	47	Morgan Shepherd	Race Hill Farm Team	Buick	59.328	151.699
16	98	Ron Bouchard	Curb Racing	Pontiac	59.454	151.378
17	66	Phil Parsons	Jackson Bros. Motorsports	Oldsmobile	59.491	151.283
18	26	Joe Ruttman	King Racing	Buick	59.529	151.187
19	88	Buddy Baker	Baker–Schiff Racing	Oldsmobile	59.604	150.997
20	07	Randy LaJoie	Snellman Racing	Chevrolet	59.822	150.446
Failed to lock in Round 1
21	18	Tommy Ellis	Freedlander Motorsports	Chevrolet	59.831	150.424
22	71	Dave Marcis	Marcis Auto Racing	Pontiac	59.910	150.225
23	90	Ken Schrader	Donlavey Racing	Ford	59.935	150.163
24	75	Jody Ridley	RahMoc Enterprises	Pontiac	1:00.012	149.970
25	7	Kyle Petty	Wood Brothers Racing	Ford	1:00.046	149.880
26	17	Pancho Carter	Hamby Racing	Chevrolet	1:00.344	149.145
27	67	Buddy Arrington	Arrington Racing	Ford	1:00.546	148.647
28	23	Michael Waltrip (R)	Bahari Racing	Pontiac	1:00.600	148.515
29	81	Chet Fillip (R)	Fillip Racing	Ford	1:00.841	147.912
30	6	D. K. Ulrich	U.S. Racing	Chevrolet	1:00.980	147.589
31	70	J. D. McDuffie	McDuffie Racing	Pontiac	1:01.239	146.965
32	64	Eddie Bierschwale	Langley Racing	Ford	1:01.604	146.094
33	52	Jimmy Means	Jimmy Means Racing	Pontiac	1:01.794	145.645
34	85	Bobby Gerhart	Bobby Gerhart Racing	Chevrolet	1:01.977	145.215
35	48	Jerry Cranmer	Hylton Motorsports	Chevrolet	1:02.014	145.129
36	74	Jack Ely	Wawak Racing	Chevrolet	1:02.105	144.916
37	8	Bobby Hillin Jr.	Stavola Brothers Racing	Buick	1:02.865	143.164
38	24	Buddie Boys	Crawford Clements Racing	Pontiac	1:02.896	143.093
39	92	Jonathan Lee Edwards	Edwards Racing	Buick	1:03.149	142.529
40	20	Rick Newsom	Newsom Racing	Buick	1:03.570	141.576
Failed to qualify
41	76	Jerry Ward	Arrington Racing	Ford	1:05.556	137.287
Official starting lineup

== Race results ==
Fin	St	#	Driver	Team	Make	Laps	Led	Status	Pts	Winnings
1	3	25	Tim Richmond	Hendrick Motorsports	Chevrolet	200	97	running	185	$46,705
2	8	3	Dale Earnhardt	Richard Childress Racing	Chevrolet	200	8	running	175	$29,750
3	10	28	Cale Yarborough	Cale Yarborough Motorsports	Ford	200	0	running	165	$15,450
4	14	15	Ricky Rudd	Bud Moore Engineering	Ford	200	3	running	165	$18,375
5	11	9	Bill Elliott	Melling Racing	Ford	200	10	running	160	$19,725
6	7	27	Rusty Wallace	Blue Max Racing	Pontiac	200	0	running	150	$13,825
7	18	26	Joe Ruttman	King Racing	Buick	200	4	running	151	$10,150
8	25	7	Kyle Petty	Wood Brothers Racing	Ford	200	2	running	147	$12,085
9	1	5	Geoff Bodine	Hendrick Motorsports	Chevrolet	200	65	running	143	$14,660
10	37	8	Bobby Hillin Jr.	Stavola Brothers Racing	Buick	199	0	running	134	$9,915
11	24	75	Jody Ridley	RahMoc Enterprises	Pontiac	199	0	running	130	$8,035
12	16	98	Ron Bouchard	Curb Racing	Pontiac	199	0	running	127	$3,750
13	12	22	Bobby Allison	Stavola Brothers Racing	Buick	198	0	running	124	$10,530
14	22	71	Dave Marcis	Marcis Auto Racing	Pontiac	198	0	running	121	$7,230
15	21	18	Tommy Ellis	Freedlander Motorsports	Chevrolet	197	0	running	118	$5,190
16	31	70	J. D. McDuffie	McDuffie Racing	Pontiac	196	0	running	115	$6,505
17	30	6	D. K. Ulrich	U.S. Racing	Chevrolet	196	0	running	0	$6,245
18	15	47	Morgan Shepherd	Race Hill Farm Team	Buick	195	4	accident	114	$3,475
19	13	43	Richard Petty	Petty Enterprises	Pontiac	195	0	running	106	$5,770
20	29	81	Chet Fillip (R)	Fillip Racing	Ford	194	0	running	103	$3,510
21	27	67	Buddy Arrington	Arrington Racing	Ford	193	4	accident	105	$5,400
22	33	52	Jimmy Means	Jimmy Means Racing	Pontiac	193	0	running	97	$5,025
23	5	12	Neil Bonnett	Junior Johnson & Associates	Chevrolet	189	0	running	94	$10,545
24	35	48	Jerry Cranmer	Hylton Motorsports	Chevrolet	188	0	running	0	$4,855
25	36	74	Jack Ely	Wawak Racing	Chevrolet	185	0	running	0	$2,135
26	4	33	Harry Gant	Mach 1 Racing	Chevrolet	184	0	accident	85	$10,780
27	23	90	Ken Schrader	Donlavey Racing	Ford	162	0	valve	82	$5,680
28	26	17	Pancho Carter	Hamby Racing	Chevrolet	145	2	engine	84	$4,605
29	20	07	Randy LaJoie	Snellman Racing	Chevrolet	144	0	engine	76	$1,815
30	39	92	Jonathan Lee Edwards	Edwards Racing	Buick	136	0	ignition	73	$1,760
31	17	66	Phil Parsons	Jackson Bros. Motorsports	Oldsmobile	131	0	engine	70	$1,705
32	32	64	Eddie Bierschwale	Langley Racing	Ford	126	0	accident	67	$3,625
33	2	55	Benny Parsons	Jackson Bros. Motorsports	Oldsmobile	90	1	valve	69	$1,570
34	34	85	Bobby Gerhart	Bobby Gerhart Racing	Chevrolet	87	0	handling	61	$1,515
35	6	44	Terry Labonte	Hagan Enterprises	Oldsmobile	60	0	engine	58	$8,405
36	19	88	Buddy Baker	Baker–Schiff Racing	Oldsmobile	60	0	engine	55	$1,460
37	40	20	Rick Newsom	Newsom Racing	Buick	59	0	engine	52	$1,380
38	38	24	Buddie Boys	Crawford Clements Racing	Pontiac	51	0	accident	49	$1,355
39	28	23	Michael Waltrip (R)	Bahari Racing	Pontiac	12	0	engine	46	$1,200
40	9	11	Darrell Waltrip	Junior Johnson & Associates	Chevrolet	7	0	engine	43	$12,225
Failed to qualify
41		76	Jerry Ward	Arrington Racing	Ford					
Official race results

== Standings after the race ==
Drivers' Championship standings

	Pos	Driver	Points
	1	Dale Earnhardt	2,097
	2	Darrell Waltrip	1,846 (-251)
	3	Bobby Allison	1,775 (-322)
	4	Rusty Wallace	1,750 (–347)
2	5	Tim Richmond	1,742 (–355)
1	6	Bill Elliott	1,737 (–360)
2	7	Ricky Rudd	1,674 (–423)
2	8	Terry Labonte	1,626 (–471)
1	9	Harry Gant	1,608 (–489)
	10	Kyle Petty	1,548 (–549)
Official driver's standings

- Note: Only the first 10 positions are included for the driver standings.

Previous race: 1986 Budweiser 400	NASCAR Winston Cup Series; 1986 season	Next race: 1986 Miller American 400
