= Springfield ARCA 100 =

ARCA Menards Series race at the Illinois State Fairgrounds Racetrack

Allen Crowe 100
ARCA Menards Series
- Venue: Illinois State Fairgrounds Racetrack
- Location: Springfield, Illinois, United States
- First race: 1963
- Distance: 100 mi (160.934 km)
- Laps: 100
- Previous names: Allen Crowe Memorial (1963, 1965–1972, 1975, 1980, 1986); Allen Crowe Memorial 100 (1964, 1984, 1987, 1988, 1993, 1997–1998, 2013); Allen Crowe 100 (1973–1974, 1976–1979, 1981–1983, 1985, 2007–2012, 2018–2019, 2021, 2025); Coors Allen Crowe Memorial 100 (1989–1992, 1994, 2002, 2005–2006); Pabst Blue Ribbon 100 (1995); Super Chevy Dealers 100 (1996); Par-A-Dice 100 (1999–2001); Allen Crowe Memorial ARCA 100 (2003–2004; SuperChevyStores.com 100 (2014, 2016); SuperChevyStores.com Allen Crowe 100 (2015); Herr's Potato Chips 100 (2017); Illinois Truck & Equipment Allen Crowe 100 (2020); Atlas 100 (2022); Dutch Boy 100 (2023); Springfield ARCA 100 (2024); Calypso 100 (2026)
- Most wins (driver): Frank Kimmel (8)
- Most wins (team): Venturini Motorsports (7)
- Most wins (manufacturer): Chevrolet (12)

Circuit information
- Surface: Dirt
- Length: 1.00 mi (1.61 km)
- Turns: 4

The Springfield ARCA 100 (currently known for sponsorship reasons as the Calypso 100) is an ARCA Menards Series stock car race held annually on the Illinois State Fairgrounds Racetrack during the Illinois State Fair.

It is one of two dirt races on the ARCA schedule, the other being the Southern Illinois 100 at the DuQuoin State Fairgrounds Racetrack, both of which are longtime events on the series schedule. These two races are part of the Performance Seed Dirt Double, which is a $20,000 bonus that is given to a driver who wins both races (the last time it happened was Parker Kligerman in 2009) and if not, bonuses are given to the drivers with the three best average finishes in the two races ($7,500 for first best, $5,000 for second best and $2,500 for third best).

== History ==
=== USAC era ===
The first race was held August 25, 1963. That race was won by NASCAR driver Curtis Turner.

USAC's stock car division sanctioned the race from the race's inception in 1963, until the series' demise in 1984. 1972's race was an odd occurrence, in that Al Unser won the USAC Stock car race on Saturday, and then won the USAC Championship Dirt Car race the following day. The feat has never been repeated in the years since.

=== Co-sanctioning ===
As USAC was downsizing its stock car division, the 1983 and 1984 running of the Allen Crowe Memorial was co-sanctioned with ARCA.

=== ARCA era ===
ARCA took over as sole sanctioning body in 1985.

In years where the race has not had a title sponsor, it has been named after former driver Allen Crowe (either "Allen Crowe Memorial", "Allen Crowe Memorial 100", "Allen Crowe Memorial ARCA 100", or simply "Allen Crowe 100"). Crowe was born on November 12, 1928 in Springfield, Illinois and died in New Bremen, Ohio, on June 2, 1963 from injuries sustained in a Sprint Car race at New Bremen Speedway. Allen cut his teeth at the now-defunct Springfield Speedway. He started in stock cars and moved up fast. He soon became a first class racer, winning the Missouri-Illinois stock car title. He began racing in the USAC Championship Car Series, racing in the 1961 through 1963 seasons with 15 starts, including the 1962 and 1963 Indianapolis 500 races. He finished in the top ten six times, with his best finish of 5th in 1962 at Syracuse.

Beginning in 1989, the race was renamed the Coors Allen Crowe Memorial 100. In 1995, it took the name "Pabst Genuine Draft 100", then was known as the "Super Chevy Dealers 100" for 1996, before returning to the original name for 1997. From 1999 to 2001, the race was known as the "Par-A-Dice 100", due to a new sponsor agreement. The race reverted to the "Allen Crowe Memorial 100" (or a variation of) moniker in 2002 and kept it until being renamed the "SuperChevyStores.com 100" for 2014. The race had a title sponsor again in 2022 when Atlas Roofing became the title sponsor of the race. Dutch Boy Paint was the title sponsor of the race in 2023. The race did not have a title sponsor again in 2024 and was renamed to the "Springfield ARCA 100".

There have been no deaths in the race attributed to crashes; however, four-time race winner Dean Roper, whose son Tony Roper was killed in a NASCAR Craftsman Truck Series race 10 months earlier, suffered a heart attack on lap 17 of the 2001 race. Roper's car slowed on the frontstretch, then hit the inside retaining wall. He was unconscious when medical help arrived and later pronounced dead at Springfield Memorial Hospital.

== Race winners ==
Year	Winner
1963	Curtis Turner
1964	Bobby Marshman^{†}
1965	Bobby Isaac
1966	Don White
1967	Don White
1968	Norm Nelson
1969	Butch Hartman
1970	Norm Nelson
1971	Jack Bowsher
1972	Al Unser
1973	Jack Bowsher
1974	Roger McCluskey
1975	Butch Hartman
1976	Ramo Stott
1977	Ramo Stott
1978	Sal Tovella
1979	A. J. Foyt
1980	Terry Ryan
1981	Dean Roper
1982	Bay Darnell
1983	Dean Roper
1984	Bobby Jacks
1985	Dean Roper
1986	Dean Roper
1987	Bob Keselowski
1988	Bob Keselowski
1989	Bob Keselowski
1990	Bob Brevak
1991	Bobby Bowsher
1992	Bobby Bowsher
1993	Billy Thomas
1994	Bob Hill
1995	Billy Thomas
1996	Tim Steele
1997	Tim Steele
1998	Ken Schrader
1999	Bill Baird
2000	Frank Kimmel
2001	Frank Kimmel
2002	Frank Kimmel
2003	Frank Kimmel
2004	Bill Baird
2005	Frank Kimmel
2006	Justin Allgaier
2007	Frank Kimmel
2008	Frank Kimmel
2009	Parker Kligerman
2010	Patrick Sheltra
2011	Chad McCumbee
2012	Frank Kimmel
2013	Brennan Poole
2014	Kevin Swindell
2015	A. J. Fike
2016	Justin Haley
2017	Grant Enfinger
2018	Christian Eckes
2019	Michael Self
2020	Ryan Unzicker
2021	Corey Heim
2022	Jesse Love^{§}
2023	Brent Crews
2024	William Sawalich
2025	Brent Crews
2026	Max Reaves

- 1963 – 1982: USAC-sanctioned event
- 1983 – 1984: ARCA and USAC co-sanctioned event
- 1985 – present: ARCA-sanctioned event

† – Record for a 100-mile race.

§ - Because of inclement weather and track preparation, the race was run to a time limit as to allow other events at the Fairgrounds to start on time. Race start delayed to 1448 local time, and distance changed to one lap after 1559. Race further shortened by a red flag during the final lap caused by a crash. Race was red-flagged on Lap 76, but countback rule meant ARCA declared results official as of Lap 74.

Previous race: General Tire 100 at The Glen	ARCA Menards Series; Springfield ARCA 100	Next race: Badger 200
