= Jay Frank (racing driver) =

American racing driver (1918–1965)

- Frank, circa 1946
- Born: Jack Vincent Frank; August 20, 1918 Chicago, Illinois, U.S.
- Died: April 4, 1965 (aged 46) Los Angeles, California, U.S.

Championship titles
- AAA Stock Car (1950)

AAA/USAC Stock Car career
- Years active: 1950–1951
- Championships: 1
- Best finish: 1st in 1950

Jack Vincent "Jay" Frank (August 20, 1918 – April 4, 1965) was an American racing driver. He won the American Automobile Association (AAA) sanctioned Stock Car National Championship in 1950.

== Early life ==
Frank was born in Chicago, Illinois on August 20, 1918.

== Military service ==
Frank joined the United States Army Air Forces during the Second World War, and served in the China Burma India theater. Initially assigned to the P-40 equipped 26th Fighter Squadron, 51st Fighter Group, of the Fourteenth Air Force, based near Kunming, China, Frank shot down an enemy aircraft on December 22, 1943.

Frank was later reassigned within the 51st Group to the P-38 equipped 449th Fighter Squadron. On June 11, 1944, he claimed a Ki-43 shot down near Anqing. On July 29, as part of a fighter escort for B-24s near Sanya Bay, over Hainan Frank and 11 members of his squadron engaged 18 A6M "Zeros" of the 254th Kokutai. During an action in which his unit earned a commendation from General Claire Chennault, Frank shot down one "Zero" and claimed another damaged.

Frank ended the war with claims of three aircraft confirmed destroyed, along with one probable, and two damaged.

== Racing career ==
=== Early career ===
Frank relocated to California shortly after returning home from the war. In 1946 he began racing in California Roadster Association (CRA) sanctioned events, where he competed against others such as Troy Ruttman and Jim Rathmann. Frank achieved his first feature-race victory during the 1948 CRA season, at Carrell Speedway.

Frank switched between various West Coast racing bodies before returning to Chicago in 1949 to compete in Andy Granatelli's Hurricane Racing Association (HRA). Frank also competed in International Motor Contest Association (IMCA) sanctioned events during the 1949 racing season.

=== AAA Stock Car career ===
==== 1950: National Champion ====
Frank started and finished fifth in the inaugural race of the AAA Stock Car National Championship. Myron Fohr won the event, held at the Milwaukee Mile on July 9, 1950.

The following race of the season also took place at Milwaukee on August 24. Frank started on the pole. He lost the lead during the first lap, and developed mechanical issues. Dropping out with hub failure on the 46th lap of the 100-mile event, he finished 22nd, as Norm Nelson went on to win the race.

On September 4, Frank dominated the third race of the season. Starting second alongside Fohr at the Du Quoin Fairgrounds, Frank took the lead on the opening lap; by the 25th lap he had lapped the entire field, excluding Fohr, who soon had to pit. Frank held the lead for the entirety of the 100-lap event.

At the fourth event, a 200-miler held at Lakewood Speedway in Atlanta on September 10, Frank held the lead with 18 laps to go when he blew a tire, sending him into the pits. Billy Carden passed him, going on to win. Frank was able to finish the event in fourth, immediately behind third placed finisher Nelson. The finish left the two drivers in contention for the championship heading into the final event of the season. Nelson led in points, and Frank needed to win the final event to have a chance at winning the title.

On September 17, at the Illinois State Fairgrounds in Springfield, Frank won the race and the AAA National championship. Starting on pole after setting a new record time during qualifying, Frank finished a lap ahead of second-placed Walt Faulkner. Nelson proved unable to provide a challenge, blowing an engine.

==== 1951 ====
Frank returned for the following season, truncated and taking place exclusively on the Milwaukee Mile. He entered an Oldsmobile 88 into the season opening event, held July 15, 1951. He won the pole for the event and finished third, leading six laps.

The remaining two races of the season took place on back-to-back days, August 23 and 24. Frank finished eighth in the season-ending event, unable to challenge the leaders.

== Post-driving career ==
After his retirement from driving, Frank owned and operated a series of car-washes.

== Death ==
Frank was killed the night of April 4, 1965, after being hit by a passing truck while attempting to help a motorist whose car had caught fire on the Hollywood Freeway.

== Notes ==
Sporting positions
Preceded by Inaugural	AAA Stock Car Champion; 1950	Succeeded by Rodger Ward
