= Dean Roper =

American racing driver

- Born: December 26, 1938; Fair Grove, Missouri, U.S.
- Died: August 19, 2001 (aged 62); Springfield, Illinois, U.S.
- Cause of death: Heart Attack
- Achievements: 1981, 1982, 1983 USAC Stock Car champion

NASCAR Cup Series career
- 5 races run over 3 years
- Best finish: 49th (1984)
- First race: 1983 Daytona 500 (Daytona International Speedway)
- Last race: 1984 Firecracker 400 (Daytona International Speedway)
Wins	Top tens	Poles
0	0	0

Carol Dean Roper (December 26, 1938 – August 19, 2001) was an American stock car driver from Fair Grove, Missouri. Roper won three consecutive USAC Stock Car championships between 1981 and 1983. He also competed part time in the NASCAR Winston Cup Series and ARCA Racing Series. He was also the father of NASCAR driver Tony Roper.

== Racing career ==
=== Local tracks ===
Roper was an accomplished dirt late model racer in the Midwest. Roper's racing career began in 1960. He won five St. Louis area track titles from 1967 to 1973.

=== USAC ===
Roper won the USAC Stock Car Championship three consecutive years, 1981, 82 and 83. Roper won ten races in USAC, including four on the Springfield Mile.

=== NASCAR ===
Roper made his NASCAR debut at the 1983 Daytona 500, driving for Mueller Brother's Racing. Roper started 27th in the Evinrude Outboard Motors Pontiac, and was able to avoid problems to come home fifteenth, six laps down. Roper would run one other race that season at Talladega, starting 30th and finishing eighteenth at the Winston 500. Roper would run three races in 1984, once again running for the Mueller Brother's Racing team. Roper would finish sixteenth at the 1984 Daytona 500. Roper would also run the first Talladega race, where oil pump problems left him 28th, and the Firecracker 400, finishing 21st. Roper's final NASCAR attempt came in 1985, missing the Daytona 500 driving for Ron Spohn.

=== ARCA Racing ===
Most of Roper's major success came in ARCA racing, where he would score ten wins, eight of which came on dirt tracks. Roper made 37 starts in the series, most of which came at two tracks, Springfield and DuQuoin. Roper won in his series debut at the Terre Haute Action Track, the only time ARCA raced at the track. Roper ran two more races that season, finishing seventh at Talladega and winning at the Milwaukee Mile. Roper would make five starts in 1983, four for the Mueller Brother's and one for Bob Brevak. Roper would win at the Springfield Mile and DuQuoin for the Mueller's. Roper would only run two races in 1984, Springfield and DuQuoin, losing the engine at Springfield and finishing 25th, and finishing second at DuQuoin. 1985 again saw Roper only run at Springfield and DuQuoin, finishing first and second. Roper made his final start at Daytona in 1986, finishing last in the field of 40 cars after a lap four crash. Roper would win once again at Springfield and DuQuoin, and would come in seventh at Owosso Speedway. Roper would finish third at Springfield, while winning races at Indianapolis and DuQuoin. Roper would remain winless in ARCA until 1994, collecting what would be his final victory. By 2000, Roper was beginning to consider retirement, as ARCA was becoming more competitive, and small teams like the Mueller Brothers were having trouble keeping up. During an interview before the 2001 Par-A-Dice 100, Roper hinted that it could be his final start. Because of his success on dirt, Roper acquired the nickname "ARCA's Dean of Dirt".

== Death ==
While competing at the 2001 Par-A-Dice 100 at the Springfield Mile, Roper's No. 89 Mueller Brother's Racing Ford slowed on lap 17 and began to bounce off the inside wall. The car then found the pit entry and crashed into some pit equipment, sending spectators running. Roper was pulled from the car and rushed to the hospital. It was announced at the conclusion of the race that Roper had suffered a heart attack, resulting in the odd crash. He was pronounced dead at Memorial Medical Center. Roper died less than a year after his son Tony was killed in a Truck Series Race at Texas Motor Speedway.

== Motorsports career results ==
=== NASCAR ===
(key) (Bold - Pole position awarded by qualifying time. Italics - Pole position earned by points standings or practice time. * – Most laps led.)

==== Winston Cup Series ====
NASCAR Winston Cup Series results
Year	Team	No.	Make	1	2	3	4	5	6	7	8	9	10	11	12	13	14	15	16	17	18	19	20	21	22	23	24	25	26	27	28	29	30	NWCC	Pts	Ref
1983	Mueller Brothers Racing	89	Pontiac	DAY; 15	RCH	CAR	ATL	DAR	NWS	MAR	TAL; 18	NSV	DOV	BRI	CLT	RSD	POC	MCH	DAY	NSV	POC	TAL	MCH	BRI	DAR	RCH	DOV	MAR	NWS	CLT	CAR	ATL	RSD	54th	227	
1984	Mueller Brothers Racing	89	Pontiac	DAY; 16	RCH	CAR	ATL	BRI	NWS	DAR	MAR	TAL; 28	NSV	DOV	CLT	RSD	POC	MCH	DAY; 21	NSV	POC	TAL	MCH	BRI	DAR	RCH	DOV	MAR	CLT	NWS	CAR	ATL	RSD	49th	294	
1985	Spohn Racing	05	Ford	DAY; DNQ	RCH	CAR	ATL	BRI	DAR	NWS	MAR	TAL	DOV	CLT	RSD	POC	MCH	DAY	POC	TAL	MCH	BRI	DAR	RCH	DOV	MAR	NWS	CLT	CAR	ATL	RSD			N/A	0	

===== Daytona 500 =====
Year	Team	Manufacturer	Start	Finish
1983	Mueller Brothers Racing	Pontiac	27	15
1984	Mueller Brothers Racing	Pontiac	19	16
1985	Spohn Racing	Ford	DNQ	

Sporting positions
Preceded by Joe Ruttman	USAC Stock Car Champion; 1981–1983	Succeeded by David Goldsberry
