= AAA and USAC Stock Car =

Motorsports sanctioning body

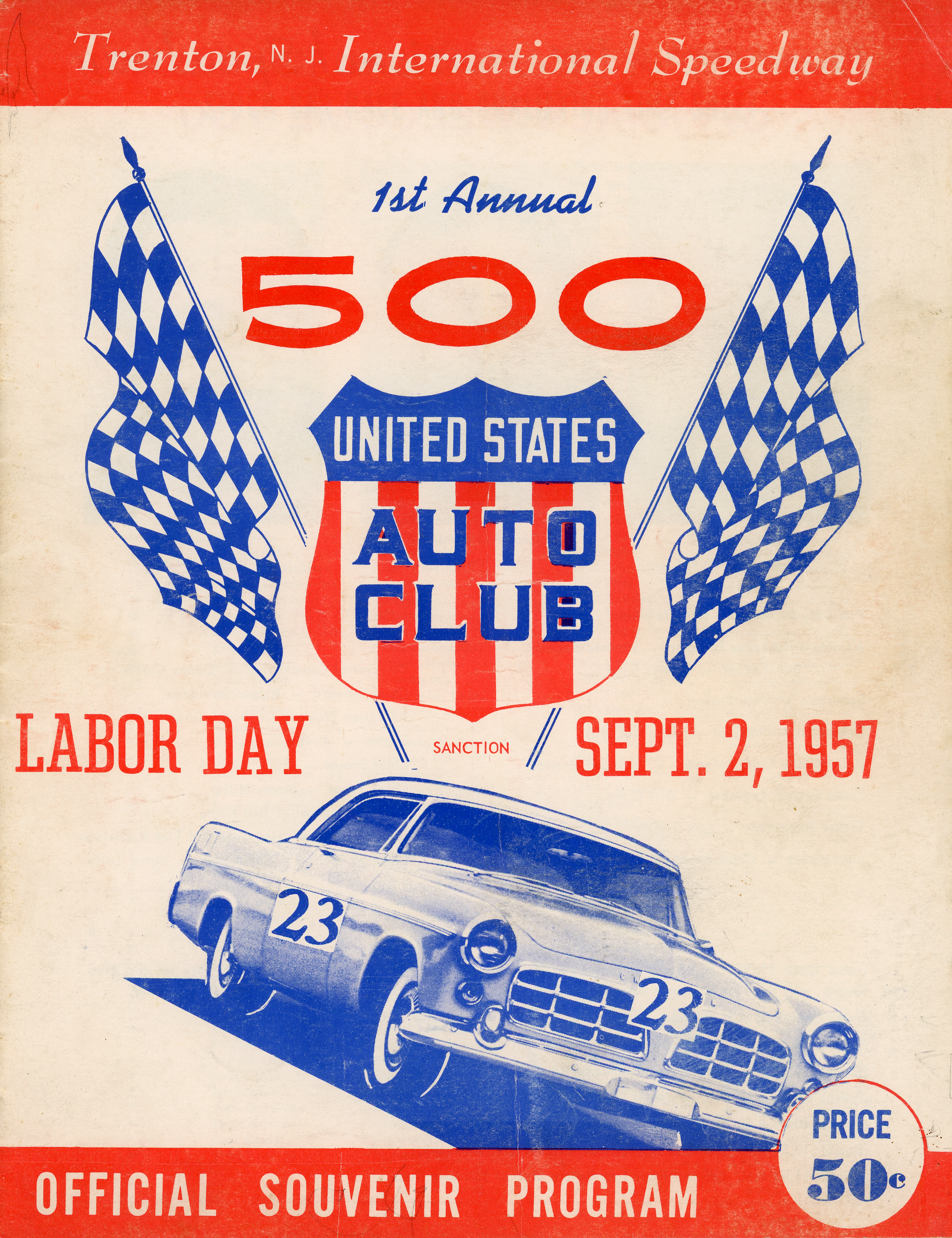
- Program cover for the 1957 Trenton 500; the race intended to become USAC's premier stock car event
- Category: Stock car racing
- Country: United States
- Inaugural season: 1950
- Folded: 1984
- Drivers: Fred Lorenzen, Norm Nelson, Butch Hartman, Roger McCluskey, A. J. Foyt, Paul Goldsmith, Don White, Parnelli Jones

The USAC Stock Car division was the stock car racing class sanctioned by the United States Auto Club (USAC). The division raced nationally; drivers from USAC's open wheel classes like Indy cars, Silver Crown, sprints, and midgets frequently competed in races and won championships. Several NASCAR drivers raced in USAC Stock Cars at various points in their careers.

In the late 1950s, USAC Stock Cars rivaled NASCAR stock cars with races throughout the Midwestern and Northeastern United States. NASCAR owners Holman-Moody found racing in USAC Stock Cars to be appealing because of USAC's ties to the Indianapolis 500.

== History ==
The stock car class began as a division of the AAA Contest Board. AAA decided to stop sanctioning all racing classes after Bill Vukovich's death at the 1955 Indianapolis 500 was followed closely by the 1955 Le Mans disaster. USAC took over sanction in all of their classes starting in 1956.

From 1963 through 1970, and again in 1972, USAC held one of its most prestigious stock car events at the beginning of the "month of May." The Yankee 300 was held at Indianapolis Raceway Park, and was often frequented by Indy car stars.

USAC continued to sanction the Stock Car division until 1984 but the series had lost some luster as the events were frequently co-sanctioned with ARCA. The final championship in 1984 was scheduled for three races but only two were run (Springfield and DuQuoin). The third event, part of the 4 Crown Nationals at Eldora Speedway, was rained out and not rescheduled.

After the division ended, many of the drivers moved to other Midwestern series such as the American Speed Association (ASA), ARCA, and ARTGO.

== Tracks ==
USAC Stock Cars raced on dirt tracks, asphalt ovals and road courses. The Milwaukee Mile was regularly on the schedule. The variety of tracks included the dirt at DuQuoin State Fairgrounds Racetrack's oval, Indianapolis Raceway Park's asphalt oval, and the asphalt circle at Langhorne Speedway. The Pikes Peak International Hill Climb was even a stop on the schedule during some seasons. During the 1970s, the series added events at Ontario Motor Speedway, Pocono Raceway, and Michigan International Speedway.

== Drivers ==
=== Champions ===
==== AAA ====
- 1950 Jay Frank
- 1951 Rodger Ward (National)
- 1952 Marshall Teague (National)
- 1953 Frank Mundy
- 1954 Marshall Teague (National)
- 1955 Frank Mundy

==== USAC ====
- 1956 Johnny Mantz (National), Sam Hanks (Pacific Coast), Troy Ruttman (Short Track)
- 1957 Jerry Unser
- 1958 Fred Lorenzen
- 1959 Fred Lorenzen
- 1960 Norm Nelson
- 1961 Paul Goldsmith
- 1962 Paul Goldsmith
- 1963 Don White
- 1964 Parnelli Jones
- 1965 Norm Nelson
- 1966 Norm Nelson
- 1967 Don White
- 1968 A. J. Foyt
- 1969 Roger McCluskey
- 1970 Roger McCluskey
- 1971 Butch Hartman
- 1972 Butch Hartman
- 1973 Butch Hartman
- 1974 Butch Hartman
- 1975 Ramo Stott
- 1976 Butch Hartman
- 1977 Paul Feldner
- 1978 A. J. Foyt
- 1979 A. J. Foyt
- 1980 Joe Ruttman
- 1981 Dean Roper
- 1982 Dean Roper
- 1983 Dean Roper
- 1984 David Goldsberry

=== Rookies of the Year ===
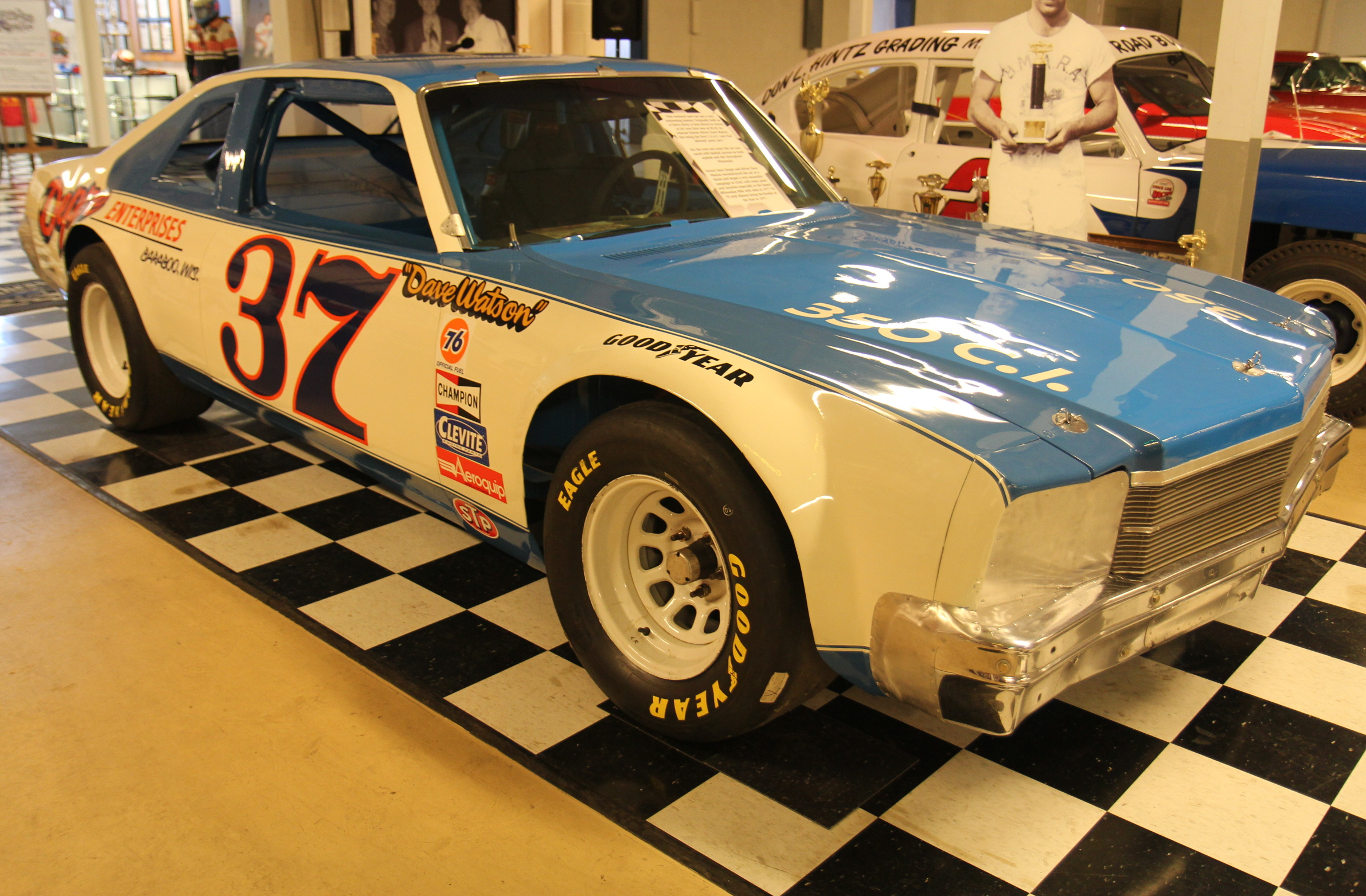
Dave Watson's 1977 Rookie of the Year Buick

Several notable drivers won the USAC Stock Car Rookie of the Year award. Indy car champions Al Unser (1967) and Joe Leonard (1964) were named the Rookie of the Year. Leonard had moved to stock cars after winning several AMA motorcycle championships. Future NASCAR drivers Dick Trickle (1968), Dave Watson (1977), Joe Ruttman (1978), Rusty Wallace (1979), and Ken Schrader (1980) plus USAC Stock Car champion Butch Hartman (1967) received the award.

== See also ==
- International Racing Association –breakaway stock car series founded in USAC Stock Car's later years
