= Butch Hartman (racing driver) =

American racing driver (1940–1994)

- Full name: Larry Hartman
- Born: May 11, 1940 Zanesville, Ohio, U.S.
- Died: December 21, 1994 (aged 54)
- Retired: early 1980s

USAC Stock Car
- Years active: 1966 – early 1980s
- Teams: Independent family team

Championship titles
- 1971, 1972, 1973, 1974, 1976: USAC Stock Car champion

Awards
- 1966 2004: USAC Stock Car Rookie of the Year; National Dirt Late Model Hall of Fame
- Cause of death: Heart attack

NASCAR Cup Series career
- 20 races run over 6 years
- Best finish: 31st (1977)
- First race: 1966 National 500 (Charlotte)
- Last race: 1979 CRC Chemicals Rebel 500 (Darlington)
Wins	Top tens	Poles
0	5	0
- Statistics up to date as of April 20, 2013.

Larry "Butch" Hartman (May 11, 1940 – December 21, 1994) was an American stock car racing national champion in the United States Automobile Club (USAC) from Zanesville, Ohio. After winning the USAC Stock Car Rookie of the Year award in 1966, he won the series' Most Improved Driver in 1967, and its Most Outstanding Driver the following year. He won five USAC Stock car national titles in the 1970s. Hartman had the fourth highest number of USAC Stock car wins in the series' history. Hartman raced in twenty NASCAR stock car races; his highest finish was a fifth-place run at National 500 at Charlotte Motor Speedway (now Lowe's Motor Speedway). Hartman worked full-time at his father's company, building his own engines and towing his cars to the track each weekend. In 1968, he became the first rookie to lead the Daytona 500.

Hartman was an independent driver in an era of factory teams. He raced a No. 75 Dodge car with yellow and black colors, sponsored by his father's company "Hartman White and Autocar Truck Sales and Service".

== Early life ==
Hartman was a second generation racer. His father, Dick, started racing sprint cars in 1949. By 1951, the elder Hartman was racing two cars and won 126 races in a two-year period.

Hartman began working on cars at the age of seven when he helped his father warm up cars for his father's automobile repair company. For his ninth birthday, his father gave an old 1939 Ford sedan to him and his brother Terry for them to drive around in a field in an adjacent property, with the condition that the brothers needed to repair the car. They nicknamed the car "Death and Destruction". After attending Otterbein College for one year, he was sent to the United States Marines for four years.

== Racing career ==
=== USAC stock cars ===
In 1964, Hartman started competing in up to five stock cars races in a weekend, driving with his father and uncle. "When we had the time," Butch said, "we'd sleep for a couple of hours in ditches alongside the road. When we didn't, one of us would stand on the running board of our old Buick and fuel our pickup truck with a five-gallon can of gas while we were tearing down the road. I think we invented in-flight refueling."

In 1966, Hartman entered a 1965 Dodge Coronet in his first USAC race. He was awarded the series' Rookie of the Year award for 1966. He had his first NASCAR start that season, a 14th-place finish at the Grand National Series' National 500 at Charlotte and a win in the ARCA series at Salem. He followed up in 1967 as the series' Most Improved Driver, then was the Most Outstanding Driver in 1968. He competed in five Grand National events that year, with 10th-place finishes at Atlanta Motor Speedway and Rockingham.

Hartman had his first USAC Stock car win in 1969 at Wisconsin International Raceway and his first 500-mile win in 1971 at Pocono Raceway driving a winged Dodge Charger Daytona in the first Pocono 500. The race featured Wally Dallenbach Sr., A. J. Foyt, Roger McCluskey, Al Unser, Bobby Unser, NASCAR drivers Jim Paschal and LeeRoy Yarbrough, AMA racer Gene Romero, modified racers Geoff Bodine and Toby Tobias, road racer Brian Redman, and USAC stock car regulars Jack Bowsher, Don White, and Norm Nelson. After completing 41 laps, the race was postponed for a week after it was rained out. The following Saturday, Hartman beat Lem Blankenship in a late race duel. Hartman won his first USAC championship that year. He had a win at the Knoxville Raceway that season.

Hartman won his second USAC Stock car title in 1972. He had a consistent season with nine top-five finishes in eighteen races. He had one start in NASCAR's Grand National division; the fifth-place finish was his highest finish in his NASCAR career. The event was FIA sanctioned and USAC drivers were encouraged to race in the event. He got a Junie Donlavey ride after USAC regular Ramo Stott has a second-place finish at Talladega Superspeedway earlier that season. The 1973 USAC season had 16 races. He won seven races and had 12 top-five finishes to record his third straight championship.

Hartman was trailing Norm Nelson by 40 points going into the final race of the 1974 USAC season. He won the race at Des Moines; Nelson finished seventh and Hartman won the title by 30 points. In the 19 race season, Hartman had won eight races to record his fourth straight championship. Hartman battled Ramo Stott for the 1975 championship, but a blown motor at the Governor's Cup 250 at the Milwaukee Mile ended his title hopes causing him to finish second in the season points. Hartman surprised people by switching to a Chevrolet Camaro for the 1976 USAC stock car season which he won his fifth championship in the new car.

Hartman was critical of USAC's promotion of its stock car series compared to how the sanctioning body promoted its championship cars and how NASCAR billed its stock cars. "…nobody ever heard of our stock car racing circuit. We get second billing everywhere to the championship cars. Here I am a two-time champion (in 1972) and nobody knows who I am."

In 1977, Hartman decided to race in NASCAR's top division, then called the Winston Cup. As a five-time USAC stock car champion, he had been receiving less money and received a lower billing at USAC stock car races than USAC champ car and NASCAR stock car drivers. He competed in 11 events and finished 31st in season points, with two top-ten finishes in a Chevrolet Chevelle. He competed in one NASCAR event in 1978 and another in 1979 before returning to USAC. He had to use No. 00, as another driver had taken No. 75. USAC's stock car series had become stagnant, and it was gone by 1985. Hartman had retired in the early 1980s.

== Awards ==
Hartman was inducted in the National Dirt Late Model Hall of Fame in 2004 for his USAC Stock Car championships and scoring "hundreds of feature wins and track titles in long career."

== Personal life ==
He was the son of Dick Hartman, owner of Hartman, White, Autocar in Zanesville, Ohio. He was the nephew of Hartman, mentioned in the base article. Hartman's youngest son Bart Hartman became a racer; as of 2007 he raced dirt late models in Ohio.

Sporting positions
Preceded by Roger McCluskey	USAC Stock Car champion 1971–1974	Succeeded by Ramo Stott
Preceded by Ramo Stott	USAC Stock Car champion 1976	Succeeded by Paul Feldner
