= NASCAR Cup Series at Pocono Raceway =

NASCAR Cup Series race at Pocono Raceway

NASCAR Cup Series
- Venue: Pocono Raceway
- Location: Long Pond, Pennsylvania, United States

Circuit information
- Surface: Asphalt
- Length: 2.5 mi (4.0 km)
- Turns: 3

Stock car races in the NASCAR Cup Series have been held at the Pocono Raceway in Long Pond, Pennsylvania during numerous seasons and times of year since 1974.

From 1982 to 2021, a second race at the track (most often a 500-mile (800 km), but last held as a 325-mile (523 km) event) was also part of the Cup Series schedule, held every June; it was replaced with a race at Gateway Motorsports Park starting in 2022.

== Current race ==
The Great American Getaway 400
- Corporate sponsor: VisitPA.com
- First race: 1974
- Distance: 400 miles (643.738 km)
- Laps: 160; Stage 1: 30; Final 2 Stages: 65 each
- Previous names: Purolator 500 (1974–1976); Coca-Cola 500 (1977–1980); Mountain Dew 500 (1981–1982); Like Cola 500 (1983–1984); Summer 500 (1985–1987); AC Spark Plug 500 (1988–1990); Miller Genuine Draft 500 (1991–1995); Miller 500 (1996); Pennsylvania 500 (1997–2007); Sunoco Red Cross Pennsylvania 500 (2008–2010); Good Sam RV Insurance 500 (2011); Pennsylvania 400 (2012, 2016); GoBowling.com 400 (2013–2014); Windows 10 400 (2015); Overton's 400 (2017); Gander Outdoors 400 (2018); Gander RV 400 (2019); Pocono 350 (2020); Explore the Pocono Mountains 350 (2021); M&M's Fan Appreciation 400 (2022); HighPoint.com 400 (2023)
- Most wins (driver): Denny Hamlin (6)
- Most wins (team): Joe Gibbs Racing (13)
- Most wins (manufacturer): Chevrolet (15)

Circuit information
- Surface: Asphalt
- Length: 2.5 mi (4.0 km)
- Turns: 3

The Great American Getaway 400 is a 400 miles (643.738 km) NASCAR Cup Series race held at Pocono Raceway in Long Pond, Pennsylvania.

Denny Hamlin is the defending winner of the event.

=== History ===
The race received its date in 1974 with some last minute planning, after failing to an agreement with the Trenton Speedway in New Jersey, Bill France Sr. called up Joseph Mattioli about a race being held at Pocono and the first NASCAR Cup Series race was held, the first winner was Richard Petty. He led 152 of the 192 laps ran as the race was called for rain with 8 laps to go.

In 1982, NASCAR added a second date to the schedule at Pocono for early June, replacing a 400-mile (640 km) race at Texas World Speedway. For a period of time, the two races were only separated as little as five weeks on the schedule. Before the double headers, the races were held seven weeks apart.

Starting in 2007, the first race was moved from its traditional July date into August, swapping dates with the Brickyard 400. This was because ESPN wanted to have their broadcast start off at Indianapolis over Pocono.

In 2008, Sunoco, the official NASCAR fuel supplier, based in Pennsylvania, and the Philadelphia region of the American Red Cross, agreed to sponsorship of the race and charity events to benefit the American Red Cross South Pennsylvania-Philadelphia region. It marked the first time since 1996 that the event carried a title sponsor. Camping World took over title sponsorship of sponsorship through its Good Sam Club in 2011.

The race was a 500-mile (804.672 km), 200 lap event from its inception in 1974, through the 2011 race. On August 10, 2011, it was announced that both Pocono races would be shortened to 400 miles (643.738 km), beginning in 2012. The second race was shortened to 325 miles (523.037 km) for its last two years.

The Bowling Proprietors' Association of America, through its marketing arm Strike Ten Entertainment, signed on as the entitlement sponsor for the 2013 and 2014 races. In 2015, Microsoft signed a one-year deal to title the event with its new Windows 10 update, and in 2016 the race returned as the Pennsylvania 400. In early-July 2017, the Marine and Watersport franchise Overton's, which is owned by Camping World, signed a three-year deal to sponsor Pocono's second race weekend through 2019, which included not only the Cup race being renamed the Overton's 400, but the 150-mile Camping World Truck Series race being known as the Overton's 150. However, on February 6, 2018, it was announced that Gander Outdoors (another company owned by Camping World) would sponsor the Cup Series races, the Gander Outdoors 400, as well as the Truck Series race, the Gander Outdoors 150. The Overton's sponsorship was transferred to the Cup, Xfinity and Truck Series races at Chicagoland Speedway in 2018.

In mid-2019, NASCAR and Pocono Raceway announced that the track would host a doubleheader weekend on the last weekend of June. On Saturday, the Truck event that is usually held in July and the first Cup race that is usually held in early June would run on Saturday. On Sunday, the Xfinity race that is run in June and the second Cup race followed. During this period, the race was shortened from 400 to 350 miles.

The Pocono Mountains Visitors Bureau was the title sponsor of the race in 2021, with the name of the race being the "Explore the Pocono Mountains 350". In 2022, the race returned to being 400 miles in length and M&M's (and parent company Mars Inc.) sponsored the race to highlight their last year as a NASCAR sponsor, and the name of the race was the "M&M's Fan Appreciation 400", which saw the career-ending crash of Kurt Busch during qualifying and disqualifications of top two finishers Denny Hamlin and Kyle Busch, the first disqualification for a race winner since 1960, while the track's second race was dropped and moved to Gateway Motorsports Park. In 2023, HighPoint, one of the sponsors of Stewart–Haas Racing's No. 14 car driven by Chase Briscoe, became the title sponsor of the race. The IT company is based in North Jersey in Sparta a little over an hour from the track.

=== Notable moments ===
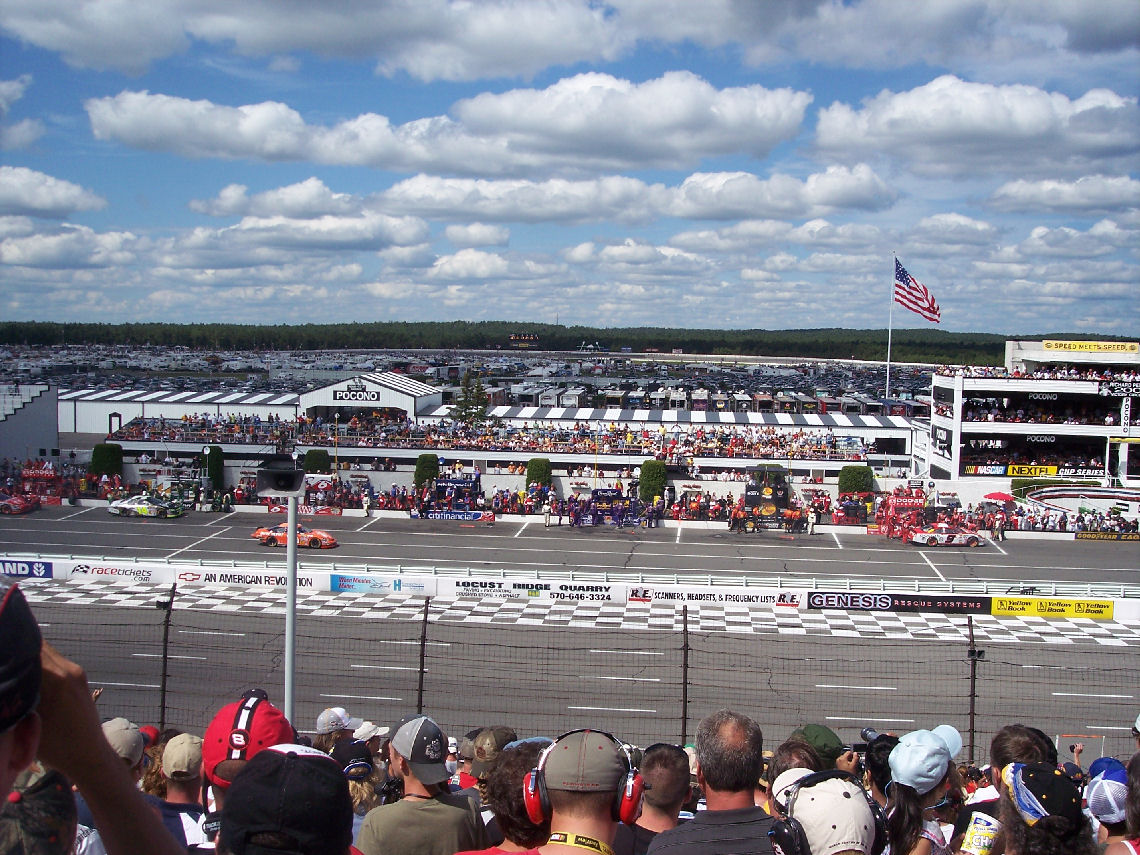
2006 Pennsylvania 500

- The 1973 ACME Super Saver 500 was one of four stock car races (1971–74) at Pocono under USAC sanction. The first three were won by Butch Hartman, Roger McCluskey, and Richard Petty. McCluskey's 1972 win came in a Plymouth Superbird and came when the race was run in conjunction with USAC's Schaefer 500 in late July when a hurricane postponed the IndyCar race.
- The 1974 ACME Super Saver 500 was run on April 24, 1974. Buddy Baker won the pole and led nine laps but finished 20th with a burned valve. USAC stock car series regular Butch Hartman led 124 laps before his clutch failed with eight to go. Ron Keselowski won the race having led 61 laps total.
- 1974: NASCAR shortened its races in the first half of 1974 due to the energy crisis; the crisis had passed and in July races, including Pocono, were put back to their full distance. Additionally, Pocono was not listed on the original 1974 NASCAR schedule; a 300-mile (480 km) race at Trenton Speedway was listed in several issues of Stock Car Racing magazine, notably the magazine's June 1974 issue. The Trenton date was subsequently switched to Pocono.
- Pocono broke 40 official lead changes in seven of the first nine NASCAR-sanctioned Pennsylvania 500s (1975–77, 1979–80, 1982–83).
- 1975: David Pearson's win came amid controversy; his Mercury, sponsored by race sponsor Purolator Filters, was leaking oil in the form of smoke throughout the race's final ten laps but NASCAR waited until two laps to go to wave a black flag at him, by which time it was too late, since drivers are allowed to stay out for three laps before heeding a black flag. Under current NASCAR rules, if a black flag is waved within the final five laps (offside (illegal pass before crossing start-finish line on start or restart), out of bounds (below double yellow line on restrictor plate tracks or cutting a chicane), or inappropriate driving), and the driver does not respond, he will be assessed a time penalty that will be calculated into final results (often a penalty that moves the driver to the last car on the lap they were running, or a lap penalty).
- 1976: The next year, 1976, Pearson led 14 times for 124 laps but blew a tire with two to go, giving Petty the win. Bobby Allison, nursing injuries sustained in a short track crash in Elko, MN weeks earlier, battled for the lead in the first 40 laps but during a pitstop took off with unsecured left side tires; they fell off in the track's Tunnel Turn. The lead changed 47 times among eight drivers.
- 1977: The 1977 running was sponsored by Coca-Cola. Darrell Waltrip won the pole, his first on a superspeedway (photos from the race were used by Sports Illustrated in an October piece on Waltrip). The lead changed 46 times among seven drivers as Benny Parsons held off a late charge from Richard Petty for the win.
- 1978: The 1978 running saw the fewest cautions (1) in track history. Darrell Waltrip edged David Pearson for the win.
- 1979: The 1979 running saw the most lead changes (56) in track history as rain postponed the race from Sunday to Monday. Dale Earnhardt suffered serious injuries on Lap 93 when his Chevrolet shot into the boilerplate wall in Turn Two. Darrell Waltrip, driving an Al Rudd Chevrolet after he crashed in Saturday practice and the DiGard team couldn't use a backup car, pitted under a late yellow for tires, dropping him from third to seventh; the race never restarted and Waltrip's pitstop cost him 19 points; he would lose the 1979 season championship by 11 points.
- 1980: Neil Bonnett escaped with the win on the final lap as Buddy Baker forearmed alongside up high but Cale Yarborough pushed Bonnett into the lead and Baker and Cale banged together. The lead changed 50 times among ten drivers. Meanwhile, Richard Petty crashed on lap 56 when the right front wheel snapped; Chuck Bown spun behind him and Darrell Waltrip T-boned Petty. Petty broke his neck but because he didn't want to be sidelined he hid his injury for months until an x-ray taken of him 4 weeks later found that the injury deteriorated over time. This resulted in officials making drivers be cleared by doctors after any kind of wreck no matter how hard the impacts are.
- 1982: Dale Earnhardt's chest injury in 1979 was followed by a leg injury in a tumble in Turn One with Tim Richmond; the crash pierced the boilerplate retaining wall, requiring 40 laps under caution to repair. The race was a ferocious affair as the lead changed 46 times and on several laps changed three times in one lap. Richard Petty ran low on gas in the final laps and Darrell Waltrip ran out on the final lap, securing the win for Bobby Allison.
- 1986: Richmond won the Pennsylvania 500 in 1983 and 1986; in 1986 he was involved in a crash in Turn Two with Richard Petty; he drove backwards to pit road and lost a lap, then got it back when Earnhardt crashed twice in a span of ten laps; he got four tires with five to go, then passed six cars before winning in a wild three-abreast finish with Ricky Rudd and Geoff Bodine. Neil Bonnett suffered an arm injury on the restart after Richmond's wreck; Morgan Shepherd spun in the Tunnel Turn and several cars plowed into the scene; Bonnett slid into the inside guardrail, flopped onto his side, and landed on four wheels.
- 1989: The track's boilerplate wall was pierced three times in 1989 - in June Geoff Bodine broke his leg (and didn't find this out until days later) in Turn One; in July Jimmy Horton pierced the wall in Turn Two; during the lengthy yellow for repairs a jack rabbit got onto the speedway near the start-finish line; it escaped initial attempt at capture by the track safety crew but was caught unharmed minutes later and released into the nearby forest. Later in the race in One Greg Sacks and Lake Speed hammered the wall in One and Sacks took a wild tumble reminiscent of Earnhardt's 1982 flip. The boilerplate was replaced by concrete in 1990. Geoff Bodine and Rusty Wallace battled on and off throughout the 500, but Bill Elliott ran both down in the final 20 laps; Bodine spun out of second with 15 to go, then with seven to go Wallace skidded through the Tunnel Turn and Elliott took the win, tying him with Richmond for most wins at Pocono.
- 1990: Bodine won the Pennsylvania 500 twice, in 1990 driving for Junior Johnson and in 1994 driving the car formerly owned by Alan Kulwicki. His 1990 win came in a spirited contest; the lead changed four times on Lap 117 between Bodine and Davey Allison and three times on Lap 180 between Bodine, Allison, and Rusty Wallace.
- 1992: Darrell Waltrip picked up his penultimate victory after a race marred by a frightening crash involving Davey Allison when Allison and Waltrip's cars contacted, sending Allison skidding into the grass and later flipping repeatedly before resting on the car roof. As a result of the accident, this led to Allison losing the points lead for the first time that season; as Bill Elliott moved into the points lead after this race.
- 1993: Dale Earnhardt won after a spirited affair; on several laps the lead changed twice to three times in a single lap between him, Ernie Irvan, Kyle Petty, Dale Jarrett, and a surprising Brett Bodine. Following the race he was given a Robert Yates Racing No. 28 flag and flew it while slowly driving clockwise around the track, a tribute to Davey Allison who had died in a helicopter accident days earlier, and Alan Kulwicki, who had died in a plane crash in April.
- 1995: Dale Jarrett scored his first win for Robert Yates in the 1995 race; he won it again in 1997. The 1995 running was the most competitive (37 lead changes among 13 drivers) since 1983 and once again the lead changed twice a lap on several laps.
- 2000: Jeremy Mayfield who won in June at Pocono, was well on his way to a season sweep of Pocono in 2000. He and teammate Rusty Wallace were battling for the lead in the final laps, when on the final lap, Mayfield blew a tire entering the Tunnel Turn, allowing Wallace to squirt by and score the upset.
- 2002: Bill Elliott became Pocono's first five-time winner. This race is also memorable for a wreck on the first lap, when Steve Park and Dale Earnhardt Jr. were sent into an old highway guardrail barrier on the straightaway, causing Park to flip violently. The race was shortened by 25 laps due to darkness caused by the repairs from the Park accident and a lengthy rain delay.
- 2006: In his Rookie of the Year campaign, Denny Hamlin completed a season sweep of Pocono. Meanwhile, Hamlin's teammate, Tony Stewart was the center of controversy after an on-track altercation with Clint Bowyer, where Stewart flipped Bowyer the finger and then intentionally crashed Bowyer, collecting Carl Edwards. Stewart was held multiple laps down and penalized 25 points.
- 2007: Kurt Busch dominated the 2007 race, leading a race record 175 laps. It was the final Pocono race before the debut of NASCAR's Car of Tomorrow. In this race it is remembered for the fact that Robby Gordon was disqualified by NASCAR for his actions the previous day at the NBS race at Montreal. Robby Gordon Motorsports' backup driver, P. J. Jones took his place in the No. 7 chevy.
- 2009: Denny Hamlin won the 2009 running after rain postponed the race from Sunday to Monday. Pocono had debuted NASCAR's double-file restart rule in June; in August it helped Hamlin gain positions with the leaders sometimes racing four abreast.
- 2010: Greg Biffle took two tires on the race's final pit stop to grab the lead; his victory snapped a 64-race winless streak. It also came in the first Cup race following a plane crash that left team owner Jack Roush hospitalized. Elliott Sadler, a day removed from winning the Camping World Trucks Series debut at Pocono, was involved in a violent melee also involving Kurt Busch; Sadler was spun out and punched the inside guardrail so savagely it ripped the engine out of his car and threw it several hundred feet (the crash was only caught on camera partially as ESPN cameras were trained on Busch). Minutes after the accident it was declared NASCAR's hardest wreck in history. The race itself began with a 100-lap period under green during which Jimmie Johnson put half the field a lap down, but a caution at Lap 124 set up a wild second half with several bouts of four-abreast racing up front. It marked the first Cup win of 2010 for Ford, and the first since Jamie McMurray won at Talladega for Roush on November 1, 2009, in the 26 car.
- 2011: Brad Keselowski, after being in a horrible testing crash at Road Atlanta earlier in the week, breaking his left foot and hurting his right foot and back as a result, held off Kyle Busch over the final 19 laps to win his second race of 2011. The race was almost called after 124 laps due to rain but was restarted. On the final lap Jimmie Johnson and Kurt Busch made contact on the backstretch when Johnson drove into him. The two exchanged heat in an argument on pit road after the race. The race would wind up being the last 500-mile-long NASCAR race at the track, as announced a few days after that in 2012 both races at the track would be changed from 500 to 400-mile events.
- 2012: Tragedy marred the first 400-mile (640 km) August Pocono race, shortened by rain; a heavy thunderstorm ended the race well short of the distance and lightning struck the northern parking lot; one spectator was killed and nearly a dozen others injured. Rain had delayed the start some two hours, and Denny Hamlin fought with pole-sitter Juan Pablo Montoya for the lead. Jimmie Johnson would lead the most laps but would wreck with Matt Kenseth on Lap 91, giving Jeff Gordon the victory, as well as his sixth victory at Pocono, the most at the track.
- 2013: The new Generation 6 car saw a very competitive race with 27 lead changes among 14 drivers. Jimmie Johnson won the pole, and dominated the first quarter of the race, but he ended up slipping to the back of the pack and a 13th-place finish after cutting a right front tire and hitting the outside wall on lap 78. Johnson was not alone, as David Stremme and David Gilliland also had right front tire troubles. Kasey Kahne dominated the second half of the race, leading 66 laps, and had built up a 7.5 second lead on teammate Jeff Gordon when a debris caution came out on lap 149, erasing Kahne's lead. Gordon managed to take the lead from Kahne on the next restart and led until Matt Kenseth spun to bring out another caution. On the resulting restart, Kahne retook the lead from Gordon and held off Gordon for the last two laps to win his second race of the season.
- 2014: A 13 car wreck broke out on lap 117 when Denny Hamlin spun in the entrance to the Long Pond Straightaway and cars behind him tried to check up. June race winner Dale Earnhardt Jr. took the lead with 14 laps to go and managed to build a 3.5 second lead over Kevin Harvick before a caution came out after Kurt Busch cut a tire. Despite the caution, he narrowly held off Harvick over a four-lap shootout to complete the first Pocono sweep since Hamlin's 2006 sweep. It was Earnhardt Jr.'s first sweep of a track in Cup competition since sweeping both Talladega races in 2002.
- 2015: A red flag happened early in the race when Kasey Kahne slammed the inside wall lining pit road on lap 6. After a caution-riddled first half, the last 68 laps were run caution-free, leading drivers to play the fuel mileage game. With three laps to go, race leader Joey Logano ran out of gas while trying to stretch his tank, giving the lead to Kyle Busch, who himself ran out of fuel just after taking the white flag. Matt Kenseth, running 15 seconds behind Busch at the white flag, sped past the limping Busch to score his first Pocono win and second win of the season, thwarting Busch's attempts at being the first driver since Jimmie Johnson in 2007 to win four straight Cup races.
- 2016: The 2016 running was postponed to Monday after rain soaked the track, Chris Buescher grabbed his first win after the race was called due to fog in the area, A red flag happened late in the race with 22 laps to go. The race saw a spirited duel for the lead between Kyle Larson and Austin Dillon where Dillon led Lap 78 by a wheel; Larson got back around him in One, then on Lap 80 Dillon stormed underneath Larson in the short stretch; in Turn Three the two collided and Joey Logano shot three abreast in to the lead. Logano was later involved in a crash when Denny Hamlin passed him and Chase Elliott got underneath him in the Tunnel Turn and both crashed.
- 2018: Bubba Wallace's brakes failed, causing him to slide through the turn 1 grass, impacting the wall at a high speed. On the restart, Erik Jones tried making it 3 abreast, only for Kyle Busch to swing round the outside. He would go on to win the race.
- 2019: Denny Hamlin tied Bill Elliott for second on the wins list among drivers at Pocono, winning for the fifth time. Jeff Gordon is the all-time winner at Pocono with six wins. However, two of Gordon's wins and one of Elliott's wins were truncated due to either darkness or rain. That means Gordon and Elliott both won four times at Pocono in which the race went the distance. Hamlin became the all-time winner in Pocono Raceway history when it comes to winning races that have gone the distance, with all five of his wins in events that went the distance or into overtime.
- 2020: Denny Hamlin and Kevin Harvick swapped their finishing orders from the first Cup race in the doubleheader. After two red flags due to weather, several cautions for crashes, and impending darkness (Pocono doesn't have lights), Denny Hamlin tied Jeff Gordon for most all-time wins at Pocono with his sixth triumph. Pocono Raceway refers the race as the first "nighttime finish in the track's history." Race finished five minutes past sunset at 8:43 PM EST, with the sunset at 8:38 PM EST. This also marked the latest time of day a Cup race concluded in the track's history. Despite the delays and darkness, all 140 laps/350 miles were completed.
- 2021: In an unpredictable race that had been led up to by Saturday's Cup race, Kyle Busch prevailed to become the winningest active driver with his 59th-career win. In the early part of the race, Busch's transmission kept slipping out of gear, and after a pit stop after Stage 2 he would have to ride the rest of the race in fourth gear. Coming down to fuel mileage, Keselowski led until he came down with 8 laps to go. William Byron inherited the lead thinking they had enough, but he didn't save enough and ran out coming to two laps to go. Denny Hamlin looked like he was going to get his seventh triumph at Pocono until he ran out coming to the white, giving Busch the lead. Busch, who pitted one lap later than the rest, was able to make it on gas with only fourth gear, and a burnt clutch for his fourth win at Pocono a comfortable seven seconds over Kyle Larson.
- 2022: For the first time since 1981, this would be the only Cup race at Pocono in a season. They lost their June race (first race) to Gateway. Kurt Busch suffered what turned out to be a career-ending concussion following a crash in qualifying and was replaced by Ty Gibbs in his first Cup Series start. After the conclusion of the race, race winner Denny Hamlin and 2nd-place finisher Kyle Busch were disqualified following a failed post-race inspection. This resulted in 3rd place driver Chase Elliott being declared the winner despite not leading a single lap during the event. It marked the first time since the DQ rule that was instituted in 2019 was used to determine a Cup Series winner. Xfinity and Truck events had ended like this numerous times. It was the first time since 1960 that the winner of a Cup race was disqualified, and the highest finishing car that passed was declared the winner.

=== Past winners ===
| Year | Date | No. | Driver | Team | Manufacturer | Race distance | | Race time | Average speed (mph) | Report | Ref |
| Year | Date | No. | Driver | Team | Manufacturer | Laps | Miles (km) | Race time | Average speed (mph) | Report | Ref |
NASCAR/USAC (points race for United States Auto Club stock car class)
| 1971 | Sep 19 | 75 | Butch Hartman | Hartman's White & Autocar | Dodge | 200 | 500 (804.672) | 4:28:02 | 116.76 | Report | |
| 1972 | July 30 | 3 | Roger McCluskey | Norm Nelson | Plymouth | 200 | 500 (804.672) | 3:56:15 | 127.035 | Report | |
| 1973 | July 29 | 43 | Richard Petty | Petty Enterprises | Dodge | 200 | 500 (804.672) | 3:45:56 | 132.781 | Report | |
| 1974 | April 27 | 19 | Ron Keselowski | Robert Keselowski | Dodge | 200 | 500 (804.672) | 3:49:44 | 130.596 | Report | |
NASCAR
| 1974 | August 4 | 43 | Richard Petty | Petty Enterprises | Dodge | 192* | 480 (772.485) | 4:09:09 | 115.593 | Report | |
| 1975 | August 3 | 21 | David Pearson | Wood Brothers Racing | Mercury | 200 | 500 (804.672) | 4:29:50 | 111.179 | Report | |
| 1976 | August 1 | 43 | Richard Petty | Petty Enterprises | Dodge | 200 | 500 (804.672) | 4:18:54 | 115.875 | Report | |
| 1977 | July 31 | 72 | Benny Parsons | L.G. DeWitt | Chevrolet | 200 | 500 (804.672) | 3:53:41 | 128.379 | Report | |
| 1978 | July 30 | 88 | Darrell Waltrip | DiGard Motorsports | Chevrolet | 200 | 500 (804.672) | 3:30:28 | 142.54 | Report | |
| 1979 | July 30* | 11 | Cale Yarborough | Junior Johnson & Associates | Chevrolet | 200 | 500 (804.672) | 4:20:24 | 115.207 | Report | |
| 1980 | July 27 | 21 | Neil Bonnett | Wood Brothers Racing | Mercury | 200 | 500 (804.672) | 4:01:10 | 124.395 | Report | |
| 1981 | July 26 | 11 | Darrell Waltrip | Junior Johnson & Associates | Buick | 200 | 500 (804.672) | 4:11:52 | 119.111 | Report | |
| 1982 | July 25 | 88 | Bobby Allison | DiGard Motorsports | Buick | 200 | 500 (804.672) | 4:19:45 | 115.496 | Report | |
| 1983 | July 24 | 27 | Tim Richmond | Blue Max Racing | Pontiac | 200 | 500 (804.672) | 4:21:17 | 114.818 | Report | |
| 1984 | July 22 | 33 | Harry Gant | Hal Needham | Chevrolet | 200 | 500 (804.672) | 4:07:21 | 121.351 | Report | |
| 1985 | July 21 | 9 | Bill Elliott | Melling Racing | Ford | 200 | 500 (804.672) | 3:43:52 | 134.008 | Report | |
| 1986 | July 20 | 25 | Tim Richmond | Hendrick Motorsports | Chevrolet | 150* | 375 (603.504) | 3:01:08 | 124.218 | Report | |
| 1987 | July 19 | 3 | Dale Earnhardt | Richard Childress Racing | Chevrolet | 200 | 500 (804.672) | 4:06:25 | 121.745 | Report | |
| 1988 | July 24 | 9 | Bill Elliott | Melling Racing | Ford | 200 | 500 (804.672) | 4:04:10 | 122.866 | Report | |
| 1989 | July 23 | 9 | Bill Elliott | Melling Racing | Ford | 200 | 500 (804.672) | 4:14:34 | 117.847 | Report | |
| 1990 | July 22 | 11 | Geoff Bodine | Junior Johnson & Associates | Ford | 200 | 500 (804.672) | 4:01:48 | 124.07 | Report | |
| 1991 | July 21 | 2 | Rusty Wallace | Penske Racing | Pontiac | 179* | 447.5 (720.181) | 3:52:33 | 115.459 | Report | |
| 1992 | July 19 | 17 | Darrell Waltrip | DarWal, Inc. | Chevrolet | 200 | 500 (804.672) | 3:43:47 | 134.058 | Report | |
| 1993 | July 18 | 3 | Dale Earnhardt | Richard Childress Racing | Chevrolet | 200 | 500 (804.672) | 3:44:59 | 133.343 | Report | |
| 1994 | July 17 | 7 | Geoff Bodine | Geoff Bodine Racing | Ford | 200 | 500 (804.672) | 3:40:28 | 136.075 | Report | |
| 1995 | July 16 | 28 | Dale Jarrett | Robert Yates Racing | Ford | 200 | 500 (804.672) | 3:43:49 | 134.038 | Report | |
| 1996 | July 21 | 2 | Rusty Wallace | Penske Racing | Ford | 200 | 500 (804.672) | 3:27:03 | 144.892 | Report | |
| 1997 | July 20 | 88 | Dale Jarrett | Robert Yates Racing | Ford | 200 | 500 (804.672) | 3:31:10 | 142.068 | Report | |
| 1998 | July 26 | 24 | Jeff Gordon | Hendrick Motorsports | Chevrolet | 200 | 500 (804.672) | 3:42:47 | 134.66 | Report | |
| 1999 | July 25 | 18 | Bobby Labonte | Joe Gibbs Racing | Pontiac | 200 | 500 (804.672) | 4:16:27 | 116.982 | Report | |
| 2000 | July 23 | 2 | Rusty Wallace | Penske Racing | Ford | 200 | 500 (804.672) | 3:49:36 | 130.662 | Report | |
| 2001 | July 29 | 18 | Bobby Labonte | Joe Gibbs Racing | Pontiac | 200 | 500 (804.672) | 3:42:54 | 134.59 | Report | |
| 2002 | July 28 | 9 | Bill Elliott | Evernham Motorsports | Dodge | 175* | 437.5 (704.088) | 3:28:39 | 125.809 | Report | |
| 2003 | July 27 | 12 | Ryan Newman | Penske Racing | Dodge | 200 | 500 (804.672) | 3:54:55 | 127.705 | Report | |
| 2004 | August 1 | 48 | Jimmie Johnson | Hendrick Motorsports | Chevrolet | 200 | 500 (804.672) | 3:57:35 | 126.271 | Report | |
| 2005 | July 24 | 97 | Kurt Busch | Roush Racing | Ford | 203* | 507.5 (816.742) | 4:03:03 | 125.283 | Report | |
| 2006 | July 23 | 11 | Denny Hamlin | Joe Gibbs Racing | Chevrolet | 200 | 500 (804.672) | 3:46:12 | 132.626 | Report | |
| 2007 | August 5 | 2 | Kurt Busch | Penske Racing | Dodge | 200 | 500 (804.672) | 3:47:55 | 131.627 | Report | |
| 2008 | August 3 | 99 | Carl Edwards | Roush Fenway Racing | Ford | 200 | 500 (804.672) | 3:49:46 | 130.567 | Report | |
| 2009 | August 3* | 11 | Denny Hamlin | Joe Gibbs Racing | Toyota | 200 | 500 (804.672) | 3:57:21 | 126.396 | Report | |
| 2010 | August 1 | 16 | Greg Biffle | Roush Fenway Racing | Ford | 200 | 500 (804.672) | 3:46:51 | 132.246 | Report | |
| 2011 | August 7 | 2 | Brad Keselowski | Penske Racing | Dodge | 200 | 500 (804.672) | 3:37:35 | 137.878 | Report | |
| 2012* | August 5 | 24 | Jeff Gordon | Hendrick Motorsports | Chevrolet | 98* | 245 (394.289) | 1:45:34 | 139.249 | Report | |
| 2013 | August 4 | 5 | Kasey Kahne | Hendrick Motorsports | Chevrolet | 160 | 400 miles (640 km) | 3:06:02 | 129.009 | Report | |
| 2014 | August 3 | 88 | Dale Earnhardt Jr. | Hendrick Motorsports | Chevrolet | 160 | 400 (643.737) | 3:08:22 | 127.411 | Report | |
| 2015 | August 2 | 20 | Matt Kenseth | Joe Gibbs Racing | Toyota | 160 | 400 (643.737) | 3:01:36 | 132.159 | Report | |
| 2016 | August 1* | 34 | Chris Buescher | Front Row Motorsports | Ford | 138* | 345 (555.224) | 2:42:15 | 127.581 | Report | |
| 2017 | July 30 | 18 | Kyle Busch | Joe Gibbs Racing | Toyota* | 160 | 400 (643.737) | 2:50:07 | 141.08 | Report | |
| 2018 | July 29 | 18 | Kyle Busch | Joe Gibbs Racing | Toyota | 164* | 410 (659.83) | 3:05:43 | 132.46 | Report | |
| 2019 | July 28 | 11 | Denny Hamlin | Joe Gibbs Racing | Toyota | 163* | 407.5 (655.807) | 2:59:22 | 133.804 | Report | |
| 2020 | June 28 | 11 | Denny Hamlin | Joe Gibbs Racing | Toyota | 140 | 350 (563.270) | 2:50:54 | 122.879 | Report | |
| 2021 | June 27 | 18 | Kyle Busch | Joe Gibbs Racing | Toyota | 140 | 350 (563.270) | 2:26:49 | 143.036 | Report | |
| 2022 | July 24 | 9 | Chase Elliott* | Hendrick Motorsports | Chevrolet | 160 | 400 (643.737) | 3:15:59 | 122.459 | Report | |
| 2023 | July 23 | 11 | Denny Hamlin | Joe Gibbs Racing | Toyota | 160 | 400 (643.737) | 3:21:04 | 119.363 | Report | |
| 2024 | July 14 | 12 | Ryan Blaney | Team Penske | Ford | 160 | 400 (643.737) | 3:13:59 | 123.722 | Report | |
| 2025 | June 22 | 19 | Chase Briscoe | Joe Gibbs Racing | Toyota | 160 | 400 (643.737) | 3:04:20 | 130.199 | Report | |
| 2026 | June 14 | 11 | Denny Hamlin | Joe Gibbs Racing | Toyota | 160 | 400 (643.737) | 2:56:36 | 135.9 | Report | |
| 2027 | June 13 | | | | | | | | | Report | |

==== Notes ====
- 1974, 1986, 1991, 2012, and 2016: Race shortened due to rain/fog.
- 1979, 2009, and 2016: Race postponed from Sunday to Monday due to rain.
- 2002: Race suspended twice (once due to track repair and once due to rain) and shortened due to darkness and incoming rain.
- 2005, 2018, and 2019: Race extended due to NASCAR Overtime.
- 2022: Chase Elliott declared winner after 1st and 2nd place finishers Denny Hamlin and Kyle Busch were disqualified for illegal modifications to the front fascia.

==== Multiple winners (drivers) ====
| # Wins | Driver | Years won |
|---|---|---|
| 6 | Denny Hamlin | 2006, 2009, 2019, 2020, 2023, 2026 |
| 4 | Bill Elliott | 1985, 1988, 1989, 2002 |
| 3 | Richard Petty | 1973, 1974, 1976 |
| 3 | Darrell Waltrip | 1978, 1981, 1992 |
| 3 | Rusty Wallace | 1991, 1996, 2000 |
| 3 | Kyle Busch | 2017, 2018, 2021 |
| 2 | Tim Richmond | 1983, 1986 |
| 2 | Dale Earnhardt | 1987, 1993 |
| 2 | Geoff Bodine | 1990, 1994 |
| 2 | Dale Jarrett | 1995, 1997 |
| 2 | Bobby Labonte | 1999, 2001 |
| 2 | Kurt Busch | 2005, 2007 |
| 2 | Jeff Gordon | 1998, 2012 |

==== Multiple winners (teams) ====
| # Wins | Team | Years won |
|---|---|---|
| 13 | Joe Gibbs Racing | 1999, 2001, 2006, 2009, 2015, 2017-2021, 2023, 2025, 2026 |
| 7 | Hendrick Motorsports | 1986, 1998, 2004, 2012-2014, 2022 |
| 7 | Team Penske | 1991, 1996, 2000, 2003, 2007, 2011, 2024 |
| 3 | Petty Enterprises | 1973, 1974, 1976 |
| 3 | Junior Johnson & Associates | 1979, 1981, 1990 |
| 3 | Melling Racing | 1985, 1988, 1989 |
| 3 | RFK Racing | 2005, 2008, 2010 |
| 2 | Wood Brothers Racing | 1975, 1980 |
| 2 | DiGard Motorsports | 1978, 1982 |
| 2 | Richard Childress Racing | 1987, 1993 |
| 2 | Robert Yates Racing | 1995, 1997 |

==== Manufacturer wins ====
| # Wins | Manufacturer | Years won |
|---|---|---|
| 15 | Chevrolet | 1977-1979, 1984, 1986, 1987, 1992, 1993, 1998, 2004, 2006, 2012-2014, 2022 |
| 14 | Ford | 1985, 1988-1990, 1994-1997, 2000, 2005, 2008, 2010, 2016, 2024 |
| 10 | Toyota | 2009, 2015, 2017-2021, 2023, 2025, 2026 |
| 9 | Dodge | 1971, 1973, 1974, 1974, 1976, 2002, 2003, 2007, 2011 |
| 4 | Pontiac | 1983, 1991, 1999, 2001 |
| 2 | Mercury | 1975, 1980 |
| 2 | Buick | 1981, 1982 |
| 1 | Plymouth | 1972 |

== Former second race ==
Pocono Organics CBD 325
NASCAR Cup Series
- Venue: Pocono Raceway
- Location: Long Pond, Pennsylvania, United States
- First race: 1982
- Last race: 2021
- Distance: 325 miles (523.037 km)
- Laps: 130; Stage 1: 25; Stage 2: 52; Final stage: 53
- Previous names: Van Scoy Diamond Mine 500 (1982–1985); Miller High Life 500 (1986–1989); Miller Genuine Draft 500 (1990); Champion Spark Plug 500 (1991–1993); UAW-GM Teamwork 500 (1994–1996); Pocono 500 (1997–2009); Gillette Fusion ProGlide 500 (2010); 5-hour Energy 500 (2011); Pocono 400 Presented by #NASCAR (2012); Party in the Poconos 400 Presented by Walmart (2013); Pocono 400 (2014, 2018–2019); Axalta "We Paint Winners" 400 (2015–2016); Axalta presents the Pocono 400 (2017); Pocono Organics 325 (2020); Pocono Organics CBD 325 (2021)
- Most wins (driver): Jeff Gordon (4)
- Most wins (team): Hendrick Motorsports (12)
- Most wins (manufacturer): Chevrolet (19)

Circuit information
- Surface: Asphalt
- Length: 2.5 mi (4.0 km)
- Turns: 3

The Pocono Organics CBD 325 was a NASCAR Cup Series stock car race held annually at Pocono Raceway in Long Pond, Pennsylvania.

The race was moved to Gateway Motorsports Park to accommodate a race on 2022.

Alex Bowman was the final winner of the event.

=== Notable moments ===
- 1982: Dale Earnhardt flipped over Tim Richmond going into turn one and suffered a neck injury that he hid until the end of the season. Because of a 1984 Busch Clash crash involving Ricky Rudd where he hid his injuries, NASCAR changed the rules later that season mandating medical clearance from NASCAR officials before racing.
- 1987: Tim Richmond, making his return to racing after missing almost half the season due to what was initially reported as "double pneumonia" (later revealed to be AIDS; which ultimately claimed Richmond's life in 1989), finished the race with his penultimate career victory, despite suffering a broken gearbox that left him with only fourth gear.
- 1988: Bobby Allison reported a flat tire before the race, tried to complete a lap, but he did not. Driving into the tunnel turn, Allison blew the tire and slammed the outside wall. Then, Jocko Maggiacomo T-boned Allison in the driver's side door and Allison suffered career-ending injuries.
- 1998: Jeremy Mayfield finally won his first Cup race in an event that was interrupted by rain, but managed to go the distance. Mayfield's idol Darrell Waltrip was leading with less than 20 laps left driving for the injured Steve Park in his car owned by Dale Earnhardt. Jeremy wound up passing his idol for the race win a few laps later.
- 2000: Mayfield drew cheers and some boos as he booted Dale Earnhardt out of the way in the final corner in a resurgence year for the Intimidator.
- 2009: Tony Stewart became the first owner-driver to win since Ricky Rudd at Martinsville in 1998. It was also the first race in NASCAR history to introduce double-file restarts.
- 2010: On the Long Pond straightaway, Kasey Kahne spun across the track on the last lap and went airborne, collecting Greg Biffle, Mark Martin, Martin Truex Jr., Ryan Newman and others. Denny Hamlin won the race, which had been delayed for several hours due to rain.
- 2012: Twenty-two-year-old Joey Logano muscled his way past his mentor, 53-year-old Mark Martin, to score his second win (first in a race that was not truncated), on a newly repaved Pocono Raceway, snapping a 104-race winless streak. Logano started on the pole with a new track record, led 49 of the 160 laps, and won by about a second.
- 2014: Brad Keselowski dominated the race, leading 95 of 160 laps, but Earnhardt Jr. passed him with four laps to go to take the victory when Keselowski tried to use the lapped car of Danica Patrick to clean trash from his grille.
- 2015: Martin Truex Jr. dominated the race, leading 97 of 160 laps en route to his victory. The race was aired on Fox Sports Television for the first time on FS1 after eight years on TNT.
- 2017: Ryan Blaney won his first Monster Energy NASCAR Cup Series race after passing Kyle Busch with 10 laps to go and holding off Kevin Harvick for the final nine laps of the race.
- 2019: Kyle Busch ties Rusty Wallace for 7th on the all-time wins list with his 55th-career win.
- 2020: After four runner-up finishes in his career at Pocono, Kevin Harvick finally won for the first time after holding off Denny Hamlin in the first Cup race of the doubleheader.
- 2021: Kyle Larson battled his teammate Alex Bowman in the closing laps, finally getting around him with four to go. Larson was on his way to his 4th win in a row (a feat that had not been accomplished since 2007), until cutting a left-front tire in Turn 3 and hitting the wall on the final lap. Bowman scooted past to steal the win over Kyle Busch. Larson was able to limp the car back to a ninth-place finish, and Bowman extended Hendrick Motorsports' streak of consecutive wins to six, in what turned out to be the last race for the second Pocono date. On September 15, 2021 NASCAR released their 2022 Cup schedule, which saw Pocono lose its second date to Gateway.

=== Past winners ===
| Year | Date | No. | Driver | Team | Manufacturer | Race distance | | Race time | Average speed (mph) | Report | Ref |
| Year | Date | No. | Driver | Team | Manufacturer | Laps | Miles (km) | Race time | Average speed (mph) | Report | Ref |
|---|---|---|---|---|---|---|---|---|---|---|---|
| 1982 | June 6 | 88 | Bobby Allison | DiGard Motorsports | Buick | 200 | 500 (804.672) | 4:24:08 | 113.579 | Report | |
| 1983 | June 12 | 22 | Bobby Allison | DiGard Motorsports | Buick | 200 | 500 (804.672) | 3:53:13 | 128.636 | Report | |
| 1984 | June 10 | 28 | Cale Yarborough | Ranier-Lundy | Chevrolet | 200 | 500 (804.672) | 3:37:08 | 138.164 | Report | |
| 1985 | June 9 | 9 | Bill Elliott | Melling Racing | Ford | 200 | 500 (804.672) | 3:35:48 | 138.974 | Report | |
| 1986 | June 8 | 25 | Tim Richmond | Hendrick Motorsports | Chevrolet | 200 | 500 (804.672) | 4:24:50 | 113.279 | Report | |
| 1987 | June 14 | 25 | Tim Richmond | Hendrick Motorsports | Chevrolet | 200 | 500 (804.672) | 4:05:57 | 122.166 | Report | |
| 1988 | June 19 | 5 | Geoff Bodine | Hendrick Motorsports | Chevrolet | 200 | 500 (804.672) | 3:58:21 | 126.147 | Report | |
| 1989 | June 18 | 11 | Terry Labonte | Junior Johnson & Associates | Ford | 200 | 500 (804.672) | 3:48:27 | 131.32 | Report | |
| 1990 | June 17 | 33 | Harry Gant | Leo Jackson Racing | Oldsmobile | 200 | 500 (804.672) | 4:08:25 | 120.6 | Report | |
| 1991 | June 16 | 17 | Darrell Waltrip | DarWal, Inc. | Chevrolet | 200 | 500 (804.672) | 4:04:34 | 122.666 | Report | |
| 1992 | June 14 | 7 | Alan Kulwicki | AK Racing | Ford | 200 | 500 (804.672) | 3:28:18 | 144.023 | Report | |
| 1993 | June 13 | 42 | Kyle Petty | SABCO Racing | Pontiac | 200 | 500 (804.672) | 3:37:23 | 138.005 | Report | |
| 1994 | June 12 | 2 | Rusty Wallace | Penske Racing | Ford | 200 | 500 (804.672) | 3:52:55 | 128.801 | Report | |
| 1995 | June 11 | 5 | Terry Labonte | Hendrick Motorsports | Chevrolet | 200 | 500 (804.672) | 3:37:50 | 137.72 | Report | |
| 1996 | June 16 | 24 | Jeff Gordon | Hendrick Motorsports | Chevrolet | 200 | 500 (804.672) | 3:35:40 | 139.104 | Report | |
| 1997 | June 8 | 24 | Jeff Gordon | Hendrick Motorsports | Chevrolet | 200 | 500 (804.672) | 3:34:33 | 139.828 | Report | |
| 1998 | June 21 | 12 | Jeremy Mayfield | Penske Racing | Ford | 200 | 500 (804.672) | 4:14:39 | 117.809 | Report | |
| 1999 | June 20 | 18 | Bobby Labonte | Joe Gibbs Racing | Pontiac | 200 | 500 (804.672) | 4:12:19 | 118.898 | Report | |
| 2000 | June 19* | 12 | Jeremy Mayfield | Penske Racing | Ford | 200 | 500 (804.672) | 3:34:41 | 139.741 | Report | |
| 2001 | June 17 | 28 | Ricky Rudd | Robert Yates Racing | Ford | 200 | 500 (804.672) | 3:43:14 | 134.389 | Report | |
| 2002 | June 9 | 88 | Dale Jarrett | Robert Yates Racing | Ford | 200 | 500 (804.672) | 3:29:10 | 143.426 | Report | |
| 2003 | June 8 | 20 | Tony Stewart | Joe Gibbs Racing | Chevrolet | 200 | 500 (804.672) | 3:42:24 | 134.892 | Report | |
| 2004 | June 13 | 48 | Jimmie Johnson | Hendrick Motorsports | Chevrolet | 200 | 500 (804.672) | 4:27:33 | 112.129 | Report | |
| 2005 | June 12 | 99 | Carl Edwards | Roush Racing | Ford | 201* | 502.5 (808.695) | 3:53:24 | 129.177 | Report | |
| 2006 | June 11 | 11 | Denny Hamlin | Joe Gibbs Racing | Chevrolet | 200 | 500 (804.672) | 3:47:52 | 131.656 | Report | |
| 2007 | June 10 | 24 | Jeff Gordon | Hendrick Motorsports | Chevrolet | 106* | 265 (426.476) | 1:57:15 | 135.608 | Report | |
| 2008 | June 8 | 9 | Kasey Kahne | Gillett Evernham Motorsports | Dodge | 200 | 500 (804.672) | 3:59:36 | 125.209 | Report | |
| 2009 | June 7 | 14 | Tony Stewart | Stewart–Haas Racing | Chevrolet | 200 | 500 (804.672) | 3:36:35 | 138.515 | Report | |
| 2010 | June 6 | 11 | Denny Hamlin | Joe Gibbs Racing | Toyota | 204* | 510 (820.765) | 3:44:30 | 136.303 | Report | |
| 2011 | June 12 | 24 | Jeff Gordon | Hendrick Motorsports | Chevrolet | 200 | 500 (804.672) | 3:26:21 | 145.384 | Report | |
| 2012* | June 10 | 20 | Joey Logano | Joe Gibbs Racing | Toyota | 160 | 400 (643.737) | 3:03:12 | 131.004 | Report | |
| 2013 | June 9 | 48 | Jimmie Johnson | Hendrick Motorsports | Chevrolet | 160 | 400 (643.737) | 2:46:26 | 144.202 | Report | |
| 2014 | June 8 | 88 | Dale Earnhardt Jr. | Hendrick Motorsports | Chevrolet | 160 | 400 (643.737) | 2:52:07 | 139.44 | Report | |
| 2015 | June 7 | 78 | Martin Truex Jr. | Furniture Row Racing | Chevrolet | 160 | 400 (643.737) | 2:58:45 | 134.266 | Report | |
| 2016 | June 6* | 41 | Kurt Busch | Stewart–Haas Racing | Chevrolet | 160 | 400 (643.737) | 3:11:15 | 125.49 | Report | |
| 2017 | June 11 | 21 | Ryan Blaney | Wood Brothers Racing | Ford | 160 | 400 (643.747) | 2:48:40 | 142.292 | Report | |
| 2018 | June 3 | 78 | Martin Truex Jr. | Furniture Row Racing | Toyota | 160 | 400 (643.747) | 2:52:00 | 139.535 | Report | |
| 2019 | June 2 | 18 | Kyle Busch | Joe Gibbs Racing | Toyota | 160 | 400 (643.747) | 2:58:09 | 134.718 | Report | |
| 2020 | June 27 | 4 | Kevin Harvick | Stewart–Haas Racing | Ford | 130 | 325 (523.037) | 2:25:01 | 134.467 | Report | |
| 2021 | June 26 | 48 | Alex Bowman | Hendrick Motorsports | Chevrolet | 130 | 325 (523.037) | 2:30:38 | 129.453 | Report | |

==== Notes ====
- 2000 and 2016: Race postponed from Sunday to Monday due to rain
- 2005 and 2010: Race was extended due to a NASCAR overtime finish
- 2007: Race was shortened due to rain and darkness
- 2012: Race distance was reduced from 500 miles (800 km) to 400 miles (640 km).
- 2020: Race distance was reduced from 400 miles (640 km) to 325 miles (523 km).

==== Multiple winners (drivers) ====
| No. of wins | Driver | Years won |
|---|---|---|
| 4 | Jeff Gordon | 1996, 1997, 2007, 2011 |
| 2 | Bobby Allison | 1982, 1983 |
| 2 | Tim Richmond | 1986, 1987 |
| 2 | Terry Labonte | 1989, 1995 |
| 2 | Jeremy Mayfield | 1998, 2000 |
| 2 | Tony Stewart | 2003, 2009 |
| 2 | Jimmie Johnson | 2004, 2013 |
| 2 | Denny Hamlin | 2006, 2010 |
| 2 | Martin Truex Jr. | 2015, 2018 |

==== Multiple winners (teams) ====
| No. of wins | Team | Years won |
|---|---|---|
| 12 | Hendrick Motorsports | 1986-1988, 1995-1997, 2004, 2007, 2011, 2013, 2014, 2021 |
| 6 | Joe Gibbs Racing | 1999, 2003, 2006, 2010, 2012, 2019 |
| 3 | Penske Racing | 1994, 1998, 2000 |
| 3 | Stewart–Haas Racing | 2009, 2016, 2020 |
| 2 | DiGard Motorsports | 1982, 1983 |
| 2 | Robert Yates Racing | 2001, 2002 |
| 2 | Furniture Row Racing | 2015, 2018 |

==== Manufacturer wins ====
| No. of wins | Manufacturer | Years won |
|---|---|---|
| 19 | Chevrolet | 1984, 1986-1988, 1991, 1995-1997, 2003, 2004, 2006, 2007, 2009, 2011, 2013-2016, 2021 |
| 11 | Ford | 1985, 1989, 1992, 1994, 1998, 2000-2002, 2005, 2017, 2020 |
| 4 | Toyota | 2010, 2012, 2018, 2019 |
| 2 | Buick | 1982, 1983 |
| 2 | Pontiac | 1993, 1999 |
| 1 | Oldsmobile | 1990 |
| 1 | Dodge | 2008 |

| Previous race: Cracker Barrel 400 | NASCAR Cup Series; The Great American Getaway 400 | Next race: FireKeepers Casino 400 |
