= 1989 Miller High Life 400 (Michigan) =

14th race of the 1989 NASCAR Winston Cup Series

Race details
- Race 14 of 29 in the 1989 NASCAR Winston Cup Series
- The 1989 Miller High Life 400 program cover, featuring Bobby Hillin Jr. Artwork by NASCAR artist Sam Bass.
- Date: June 25, 1989
- Official name: 21st Annual Miller High Life 400
- Location: Brooklyn, Michigan, Michigan International Speedway
- Course: Permanent racing facility
- Course length: 2 miles (3.2 km)
- Distance: 200 laps, 400 mi (643.737 km)
- Scheduled distance: 200 laps, 400 mi (643.737 km)
- Average speed: 139.023 miles per hour (223.736 km/h)
- Attendance: 85,000

Pole position
Driver	Ken Schrader	Hendrick Motorsports
- Time: 41.207

Most laps led
Driver	Rusty Wallace	Blue Max Racing
- Laps: 131

Winner
No. 9	Bill Elliott	Melling Racing

Television in the United States
- Network: CBS
- Announcers: Ken Squier, Ned Jarrett, Chris Economaki

Radio in the United States
- Radio: Motor Racing Network

The 1989 Miller High Life 400 was the 14th stock car race of the 1989 NASCAR Winston Cup Series season and the 21st iteration of the event. The race was held on Sunday, June 25, 1989, before an audience of 85,000 in Brooklyn, Michigan, at Michigan International Speedway, a two-mile (3.2 km) moderate-banked D-shaped speedway. The race took the scheduled 200 laps to complete. On the final restart with 11 laps left in the race, Melling Racing driver Bill Elliott would manage to fend off the field and secure his 30th career NASCAR Winston Cup Series victory and his first victory of the season. To fill out the top three, Blue Max Racing driver Rusty Wallace and Hendrick Motorsports driver Darrell Waltrip would finish second and third, respectively.

== Background ==
The layout of Michigan International Speedway, the venue where the race was held.

The race was held at Michigan International Speedway, a two-mile (3.2 km) moderate-banked D-shaped speedway located in Brooklyn, Michigan. The track is used primarily for NASCAR events. It is known as a "sister track" to Texas World Speedway as MIS's oval design was a direct basis of TWS, with moderate modifications to the banking in the corners, and was used as the basis of Auto Club Speedway. The track is owned by International Speedway Corporation. Michigan International Speedway is recognized as one of motorsports' premier facilities because of its wide racing surface and high banking (by open-wheel standards; the 18-degree banking is modest by stock car standards).

=== Entry list ===
- (R) denotes rookie driver.

#	Driver	Team	Make	Sponsor
1	Lee Raymond (Note: Lee Raymond was originally entered for the No. 69 LC Racing entry. However, the team decided to change their driver before the race to Ronnie Thomas, with Raymond instead being entered in an entry owned by Jim Coble.)	Coyle Racing	Ford	Coyle Racing
2	Ernie Irvan	U.S. Racing	Pontiac	Kroger
3	Dale Earnhardt	Richard Childress Racing	Chevrolet	GM Goodwrench Service Plus
4	Rick Wilson	Morgan–McClure Motorsports	Oldsmobile	Kodak
5	Geoff Bodine	Hendrick Motorsports	Chevrolet	Levi Garrett
6	Mark Martin	Roush Racing	Ford	Stroh's Light
7	Alan Kulwicki	AK Racing	Ford	Zerex
8	Bobby Hillin Jr.	Stavola Brothers Racing	Buick	Miller High Life
9	Bill Elliott	Melling Racing	Ford	Coors Light
10	Derrike Cope	Whitcomb Racing	Pontiac	Purolator Filters
11	Terry Labonte	Junior Johnson & Associates	Ford	Budweiser
15	Brett Bodine	Bud Moore Engineering	Ford	Motorcraft
16	Larry Pearson (R)	Pearson Racing	Buick	Chattanooga Chew
17	Darrell Waltrip	Hendrick Motorsports	Chevrolet	Tide
21	Neil Bonnett	Wood Brothers Racing	Ford	Citgo
23	Eddie Bierschwale	B&B Racing	Oldsmobile	Melling Oil Pumps
25	Ken Schrader	Hendrick Motorsports	Chevrolet	Folgers
26	Ricky Rudd	King Racing	Buick	Quaker State
27	Rusty Wallace	Blue Max Racing	Pontiac	Kodiak
28	Davey Allison	Robert Yates Racing	Ford	Texaco, Havoline
29	Dale Jarrett	Cale Yarborough Motorsports	Pontiac	Hardee's
30	Michael Waltrip	Bahari Racing	Pontiac	Country Time
33	Harry Gant	Jackson Bros. Motorsports	Oldsmobile	Skoal Bandit
35	Bill Venturini	Venturini Motorsports	Chevrolet	Rain-X
36	H. B. Bailey	Bailey Racing	Pontiac	Almeda Auto Parts
42	Kyle Petty	SABCO Racing	Pontiac	Peak Antifreeze
43	Richard Petty	Petty Enterprises	Pontiac	STP
48	Greg Sacks	Winkle Motorsports	Pontiac	Dinner Bell Foods
51	Butch Miller (R)	Miller Racing	Chevrolet	Fruit of the Loom
52	Jimmy Means	Jimmy Means Racing	Pontiac	Alka-Seltzer
55	Phil Parsons	Jackson Bros. Motorsports	Oldsmobile	Skoal, Crown Central Petroleum
57	Hut Stricklin (R)	Osterlund Racing	Pontiac	Heinz
60	Mike Miller	Bilby Racing	Chevrolet	Bilby Racing
69	Ronnie Thomas (Note: Listed as J. T. Hayes per NASCAR)	LC Racing	Ford	War Eagle Construction
71	Dave Marcis	Marcis Auto Racing	Chevrolet	Lifebuoy
75	Morgan Shepherd	RahMoc Enterprises	Pontiac	Valvoline
83	Lake Speed	Speed Racing	Oldsmobile	Bull's-Eye Barbecue Sauce
84	Dick Trickle (R)	Stavola Brothers Racing	Buick	Miller High Life
88	Jimmy Spencer (R)	Baker–Schiff Racing	Oldsmobile	Crisco
89	Rodney Combs	Mueller Brothers Racing	Pontiac	Evinrude Outboard Motors
94	Sterling Marlin	Hagan Racing	Oldsmobile	Sunoco

== Qualifying ==
Qualifying was split into two rounds. The first round was held on Saturday, June 23, at 11:30 AM EST. Each driver would have one lap to set a time. During the first round, the top 20 drivers in the round would be guaranteed a starting spot in the race. If a driver was not able to guarantee a spot in the first round, they had the option to scrub their time from the first round and try and run a faster lap time in a second round qualifying run, held on Saturday, June 23, at 2:00 PM EST. As with the first round, each driver would have one lap to set a time. For this specific race, positions 21-40 would be decided on time, and depending on who needed it, a select amount of positions were given to cars who had not otherwise qualified but were high enough in owner's points; up to two were given.

Ken Schrader, driving for Hendrick Motorsports, would win the pole, setting a time of 41.207 and an average speed of 174.728 miles per hour (281.197 km/h) in the first round.

Lee Raymond was the only driver that failed to qualify.

=== Full qualifying results ===
Pos.	#	Driver	Team	Make	Time	Speed
1	25	Ken Schrader	Hendrick Motorsports	Chevrolet	41.207	174.728
2	9	Bill Elliott	Melling Racing	Ford	41.257	174.516
3	7	Alan Kulwicki	AK Racing	Ford	41.262	174.495
4	6	Mark Martin	Roush Racing	Ford	41.404	173.896
5	5	Geoff Bodine	Hendrick Motorsports	Chevrolet	41.495	173.515
6	3	Dale Earnhardt	Richard Childress Racing	Chevrolet	41.501	173.490
7	33	Harry Gant	Jackson Bros. Motorsports	Oldsmobile	41.543	173.314
8	94	Sterling Marlin	Hagan Racing	Oldsmobile	41.552	173.277
9	27	Rusty Wallace	Blue Max Racing	Pontiac	41.569	173.206
10	28	Davey Allison	Robert Yates Racing	Ford	41.626	172.969
11	11	Terry Labonte	Junior Johnson & Associates	Ford	41.686	172.720
12	4	Rick Wilson	Morgan–McClure Motorsports	Oldsmobile	41.713	172.608
13	15	Brett Bodine	Bud Moore Engineering	Ford	41.724	172.563
14	17	Darrell Waltrip	Hendrick Motorsports	Chevrolet	41.731	172.534
15	83	Lake Speed	Speed Racing	Oldsmobile	41.791	172.286
16	10	Derrike Cope	Whitcomb Racing	Pontiac	41.797	172.253
17	21	Neil Bonnett	Wood Brothers Racing	Ford	41.841	172.080
18	29	Dale Jarrett	Cale Yarborough Motorsports	Pontiac	41.850	172.043
19	57	Hut Stricklin (R)	Osterlund Racing	Pontiac	41.897	171.850
20	88	Jimmy Spencer (R)	Baker–Schiff Racing	Pontiac	41.945	171.653
Failed to lock in Round 1
21	48	Greg Sacks	Winkle Motorsports	Pontiac	41.947	171.645
22	42	Kyle Petty	SABCO Racing	Pontiac	41.978	171.518
23	75	Morgan Shepherd	RahMoc Enterprises	Pontiac	42.029	171.310
24	69	Ronnie Thomas	LC Racing	Ford	42.067	171.156
25	84	Dick Trickle (R)	Stavola Brothers Racing	Buick	42.080	171.103
26	16	Larry Pearson (R)	Pearson Racing	Buick	42.089	171.066
27	8	Bobby Hillin Jr.	Stavola Brothers Racing	Buick	42.126	170.916
28	30	Michael Waltrip	Bahari Racing	Pontiac	42.221	170.531
29	23	Eddie Bierschwale	B&B Racing	Oldsmobile	42.308	170.181
30	2	Ernie Irvan	U.S. Racing	Pontiac	42.353	170.000
31	43	Richard Petty	Petty Enterprises	Pontiac	42.363	169.960
32	55	Phil Parsons	Jackson Bros. Motorsports	Oldsmobile	42.441	169.647
33	26	Ricky Rudd	King Racing	Buick	42.561	169.169
34	71	Dave Marcis	Marcis Auto Racing	Chevrolet	42.580	169.093
35	89	Rodney Combs	Mueller Brothers Racing	Pontiac	42.593	169.042
36	51	Butch Miller (R)	Miller Racing	Chevrolet	42.682	168.689
37	60	Mike Miller	Bilby Racing	Chevrolet	42.722	168.531
38	35	Bill Venturini	Venturini Motorsports	Chevrolet	42.815	168.165
39	52	Jimmy Means	Jimmy Means Racing	Pontiac	42.993	167.469
40	36	H. B. Bailey	Bailey Racing	Pontiac	43.105	167.034
Failed to qualify
41	1	Lee Raymond	Coyle Racing	Ford	43.458	165.677
Official starting lineup

== Race results ==
Fin	St	#	Driver	Team	Make	Laps	Led	Status	Pts	Winnings
1	2	9	Bill Elliott	Melling Racing	Ford	200	44	running	180	$71,450
2	9	27	Rusty Wallace	Blue Max Racing	Pontiac	200	131	running	180	$53,025
3	14	17	Darrell Waltrip	Hendrick Motorsports	Chevrolet	200	7	running	170	$31,800
4	33	26	Ricky Rudd	King Racing	Buick	200	0	running	160	$24,575
5	13	15	Brett Bodine	Bud Moore Engineering	Ford	200	0	running	155	$22,025
6	12	4	Rick Wilson	Morgan–McClure Motorsports	Oldsmobile	200	0	running	150	$15,475
7	15	83	Lake Speed	Speed Racing	Oldsmobile	200	2	running	151	$13,900
8	8	94	Sterling Marlin	Hagan Racing	Oldsmobile	200	0	running	142	$12,900
9	16	10	Derrike Cope	Whitcomb Racing	Pontiac	200	0	running	138	$10,075
10	22	42	Kyle Petty	SABCO Racing	Pontiac	199	0	running	134	$9,900
11	1	25	Ken Schrader	Hendrick Motorsports	Chevrolet	199	15	running	135	$16,900
12	4	6	Mark Martin	Roush Racing	Ford	199	0	running	127	$10,775
13	20	88	Jimmy Spencer (R)	Baker–Schiff Racing	Pontiac	199	0	running	124	$10,725
14	11	11	Terry Labonte	Junior Johnson & Associates	Ford	199	0	running	121	$12,825
15	32	55	Phil Parsons	Jackson Bros. Motorsports	Oldsmobile	199	0	running	118	$9,675
16	28	30	Michael Waltrip	Bahari Racing	Pontiac	199	0	running	115	$7,500
17	6	3	Dale Earnhardt	Richard Childress Racing	Chevrolet	198	0	running	112	$13,775
18	30	2	Ernie Irvan	U.S. Racing	Pontiac	198	0	running	109	$6,350
19	26	16	Larry Pearson (R)	Pearson Racing	Buick	198	0	running	106	$5,785
20	27	8	Bobby Hillin Jr.	Stavola Brothers Racing	Buick	198	0	running	103	$8,195
21	34	71	Dave Marcis	Marcis Auto Racing	Chevrolet	197	0	running	100	$7,000
22	18	29	Dale Jarrett	Cale Yarborough Motorsports	Pontiac	197	0	running	97	$6,785
23	24	69	Ronnie Thomas	LC Racing	Ford	196	0	running	94	$3,925
24	17	21	Neil Bonnett	Wood Brothers Racing	Ford	194	0	running	91	$6,515
25	25	84	Dick Trickle (R)	Stavola Brothers Racing	Buick	194	0	running	88	$6,605
26	40	36	H. B. Bailey	Bailey Racing	Pontiac	192	0	running	85	$3,595
27	5	5	Geoff Bodine	Hendrick Motorsports	Chevrolet	188	0	running	82	$10,535
28	39	52	Jimmy Means	Jimmy Means Racing	Pontiac	179	0	crash	79	$3,475
29	29	23	Eddie Bierschwale	B&B Racing	Oldsmobile	175	0	running	76	$3,365
30	31	43	Richard Petty	Petty Enterprises	Pontiac	170	0	engine	73	$4,755
31	10	28	Davey Allison	Robert Yates Racing	Ford	145	0	engine	70	$11,650
32	7	33	Harry Gant	Jackson Bros. Motorsports	Oldsmobile	141	1	engine	72	$10,200
33	19	57	Hut Stricklin (R)	Osterlund Racing	Pontiac	141	0	clutch	64	$3,775
34	37	60	Mike Miller	Bilby Racing	Chevrolet	137	0	fatigue	61	$3,075
35	23	75	Morgan Shepherd	RahMoc Enterprises	Pontiac	132	0	engine	58	$11,040
36	3	7	Alan Kulwicki	AK Racing	Ford	119	0	engine	55	$6,110
37	38	35	Bill Venturini	Venturini Motorsports	Chevrolet	80	0	crash	52	$2,975
38	36	51	Butch Miller (R)	Miller Racing	Chevrolet	74	0	rear end	49	$2,960
39	21	48	Greg Sacks	Winkle Motorsports	Pontiac	34	0	oil pump	46	$2,945
40	35	89	Rodney Combs	Mueller Brothers Racing	Pontiac	2	0	engine	43	$2,925
Failed to qualify
41		1	Lee Raymond	Coyle Racing	Ford					
Official race results

== Standings after the race ==
Drivers' Championship standings

	Pos	Driver	Points
	1	Dale Earnhardt	2,057
	2	Rusty Wallace	1,935 (-122)
	3	Darrell Waltrip	1,908 (-149)
	4	Mark Martin	1,858 (–199)
3	5	Bill Elliott	1,803 (–254)
	6	Sterling Marlin	1,794 (–263)
2	7	Geoff Bodine	1,777 (–280)
1	8	Ken Schrader	1,760 (–297)
1	9	Ricky Rudd	1,749 (–308)
	10	Terry Labonte	1,700 (–357)
Official driver's standings

- Note: Only the first 10 positions are included for the driver standings.

== Notes ==
Previous race: 1989 Miller High Life 500	NASCAR Winston Cup Series; 1989 season	Next race: 1989 Pepsi 400
