= ARCA Menards Series =

American stock car racing series

- Category: Stock cars
- Country: United States
- Inaugural season: 1953
- Manufacturers: Chevrolet · Ford · Toyota
- Engine suppliers: Ilmor (ARCA Ilmor 396); Roush-Yates (RYR Spec); Chevrolet (350 small block, SB2); Dodge (R5P6); Ford (351 Windsor)
- Tire suppliers: Continental AG
- Drivers' champion: Thomas Annunziata
- Makes' champion: Toyota
- Teams' champion: Nitro Motorsports
- Official website: ARCA Racing

The ARCA Menards Series is an American stock car series, the premier division of the Automobile Racing Club of America (ARCA). It is considered a minor, semi-professional league of stock car racing, used as a feeder series into the three national touring series of NASCAR, and hosts events at a variety of track types including superspeedways, road courses, and dirt tracks.

It also provides hobby drivers a chance to experience racing at large tracks used in the three national touring series in NASCAR. The series has had a longstanding relationship with NASCAR, including using former NASCAR Cup Series cars, hosting events in the same race weekend such as Daytona Speedweek, and naming an award after NASCAR founder Bill France Sr. However, the series was not officially affiliated with NASCAR until its buyout on April 27, 2018. 2020 was the first season that the series was sanctioned by NASCAR.

The series was known as the ARCA Permatex SuperCar Series from 1986 until 1991, the ARCA Hooters SuperCar Series from 1993 until 1995, and the ARCA Bondo/Mar-Hyde Series from 1996 to 2000. The series was sponsored by real estate company RE/MAX as the ARCA RE/MAX Series from 2001 until 2009. Midwest-based home improvement company Menards began sponsoring the series in 2010 jointly with RE/MAX, and became the lone presenting sponsor in 2011, and from then until February 2019 the series was known as the ARCA Racing Series presented by Menards.

== History ==
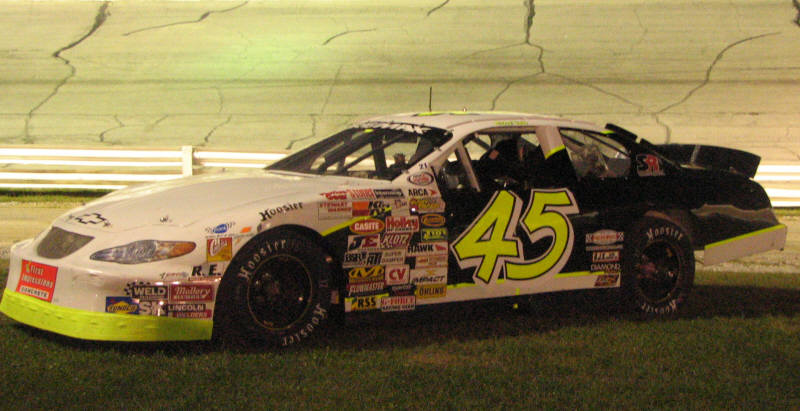
Michael Simko's ARCA Chevrolet Monte Carlo at Salem Speedway, Indiana in 2006

The series was founded in Toledo, Ohio in 1953 as the Midwest Association for Race Cars (MARC), a local touring group in the Midwestern United States. The series was founded by John Marcum, a friend and former competitor of Bill France Sr. and former NASCAR employee, who created MARC as a northern counterpart to the southern-based NASCAR. Early drivers included Iggy Katona and Nelson Stacy.

The series became a part of Daytona Speedweeks in 1964 at the request of France, allowing the series to open its season alongside the Daytona 500. That same year, the series name was changed from MARC (Midwest Association for Race Cars) to the current ARCA (Automobile Racing Club of America) as a suggestion from France to give the series more national exposure.

The series races on a variety of tracks from small ovals to superspeedways such as Daytona International Speedway. In 2008 the series returned to racing on a road course. The series is currently headed by Marcum's grandson, Ron Drager.

Due to the similarity between the cars and racetracks of the two series, the ARCA Racing Series is frequently used to develop young drivers looking to break into the top three series of NASCAR. The series has spawned such drivers as Benny Parsons, Ken Schrader, and Kyle Petty, and helped more recent NASCAR Cup Series drivers Kyle Busch, Justin Allgaier, Casey Mears, and Sam Hornish Jr. get acclimated to stock cars. Young drivers will often race in the series opener at Daytona to gain NASCAR approval to run at superspeedways in the Truck or O'Reilly Auto Parts Series. Other drivers, such as 10-time champion Frank Kimmel and 9-time race winner Bobby Gerhart remain in the series as opposed to pursuing a full-time career in NASCAR. NASCAR regulars, notably Ken Schrader, are known to frequent the series as well. Other notable drivers, such as Benny Chastain and Andy Jankowiak, race in the series as a hobby.

Drivers as young as 17 may be approved to drive on speedway tracks, and drivers as young as 15 years can be permitted to drive at ovals less than two kilometers in length and road courses. This is one year younger than the minimum age of 16 in the NASCAR FDXF Truck Series and two years younger than 17 in the NASCAR O'Reilly Auto Parts Series, again only for road courses and ovals two kilometers and under. Drivers must be 18 to race in either of the two superspeedway events the series hosts at Daytona and Talladega. Drivers 16 and 17 may participate in selected portions of the January Daytona test but may not participate in the race weekend.

An Indiana-based indie game developer created ARCA Sim Racing '08 to simulate the RE/MAX championship.

From 1995 until 2016, the Hoosier Racing Tire company was the series tire supplier, with the tires being branded in 2016 by their business partner Continental AG's General Tire. Following the death of Bob Newton, Continental AG acquired Hoosier in October 2016, and has continually become the series' sponsor. For the 2027 season, Continental will rebrand tires from the General to Continental brand.

On April 27, 2018, it was announced that the National Association of Stock Car Auto Racing (NASCAR) had bought out the Automobile Racing Club of America (ARCA), though 2018 and 2019 seasons continued as planned. The ARCA Menards Series retained its name for the 2020 season, while the NASCAR K&N Pro Series East and West rebranded as the ARCA Menards Series East and West respectively. On October 2, 2019, NASCAR and ARCA announced the creation of a ten-race short track and road course slate called the ARCA Racing Series Showdown, with drivers from all three series eligible to compete.

== Tracks ==
ARCA Menards Series tracks in 2026
Points paying races

== Television broadcasting ==
In January 2019, ARCA announced that every race for the 2019 season would be broadcast live on television. Eight races were broadcast between FS1 and FS2, while the remaining 12 races ran on MAVTV. This was the first time in series history that every race in a season was broadcast live. Starting in 2023, all races will be broadcast on FS1 or FS2 and in 2024, ARCA signed a multi year contract with FS1 and FS2 under ARCA's new TV deal that will take place until 2028. Since 2025, the Daytona round is broadcast on the Fox broadcast network. In 2026, the Salem, IN round was broadcast live on Fox as a live Saturday night event.

== ARCA Menards Series cars ==
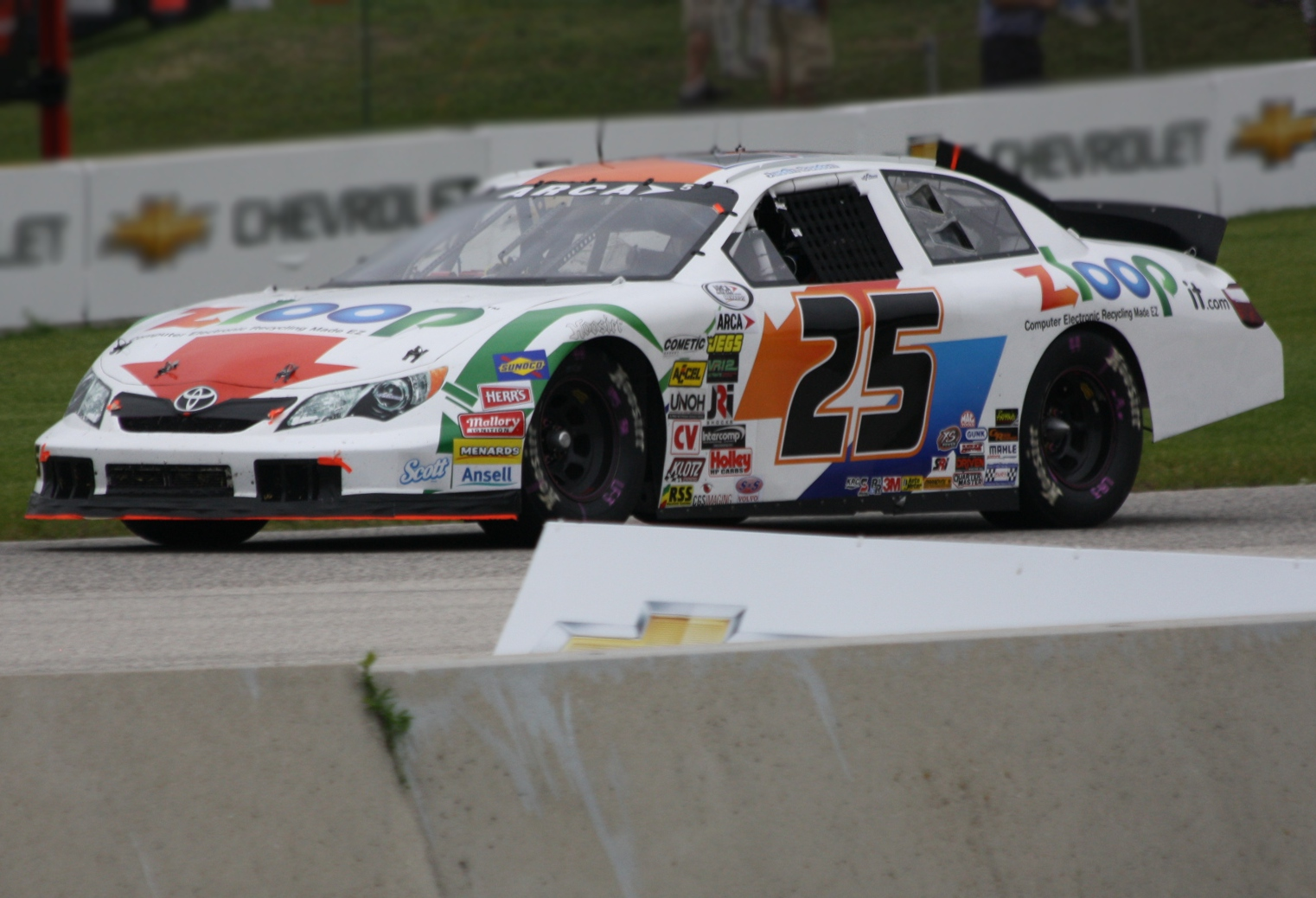
2013 Rookie of the Year Justin Boston

The series was known for using veteran steel-bodied Generation 4 cars from the NASCAR Cup Series, running cars until they are several years old and even after a model's discontinuation in the Cup Series. For example, Bobby Gerhart's winning Daytona car in 1999 used a chassis built by Hendrick Motorsports in 1989 and said car would be used until 2004 at Talladega by Boston Reid. Following the transition of the Cup and Xfinity Series to the Car of Tomorrow in 2007 and 2010 respectively, the ARCA Series continued to use the 2007-style models of the Chevrolet Monte Carlo SS (re-branded as the Impala), Ford Fusion, Toyota Camry, and Dodge Charger. The carbureted V8 engines used by the series are also built under similar specifications to their NASCAR counterparts, and occasionally purchased from NASCAR teams. In spite of the similarities, ARCA racing is much more affordable than its more popular counterpart, with car owner Larry Clement estimating the required budget to run an ARCA car as "10 percent of what a NASCAR Cup Series budget is."

=== ARCA Ilmor 396 engine ===
On August 1, 2014, ARCA president Ron Drager announced a new engine package option for the 2015 season, in addition to the current open motor rules package. The package is called the ARCA Ilmor 396 engine, alternately known as the ARCA Control Engine (ACE). Developed by Ilmor, which has also developed engines for the IndyCar Series, the engine is a "purpose-built powerplant" using Holley electronic fuel injection and based on the Chevrolet LS engine family that is able to deliver 700 horsepower and 530 ft-lb of torque. The engine costs $35,000 to build and $15,000 to be re-built, and allows teams to use the same engine at all track types for up to 1,500 miles (2,400 km) between re-builds.

The Ilmor engine debuted during testing at Daytona International Speedway in December 2014, with Sean Corr's Ilmor-powered #48 Ford topping the speed charts at an average of 188.478 miles per hour (303.326 km/h) in a time of 47.743 seconds. The new engine has generated controversy, with some teams that use the former engine package believing that their motors will become obsolete and converting to the new package will be too costly. Teams and outside engine builders also cannot perform maintenance on the engines, and minimal tuning is allowed (including a specification lubricant, currently supplied by Valvoline). The spec engine also reduces manufacturer identity for teams, with construction based on the Chevrolet engine package and branded as an Ilmor. Non-Ilmor engines, meanwhile, are subject to intake and RPM restrictions to maintain performance limits relative to the new package.

=== Composite car bodies ===
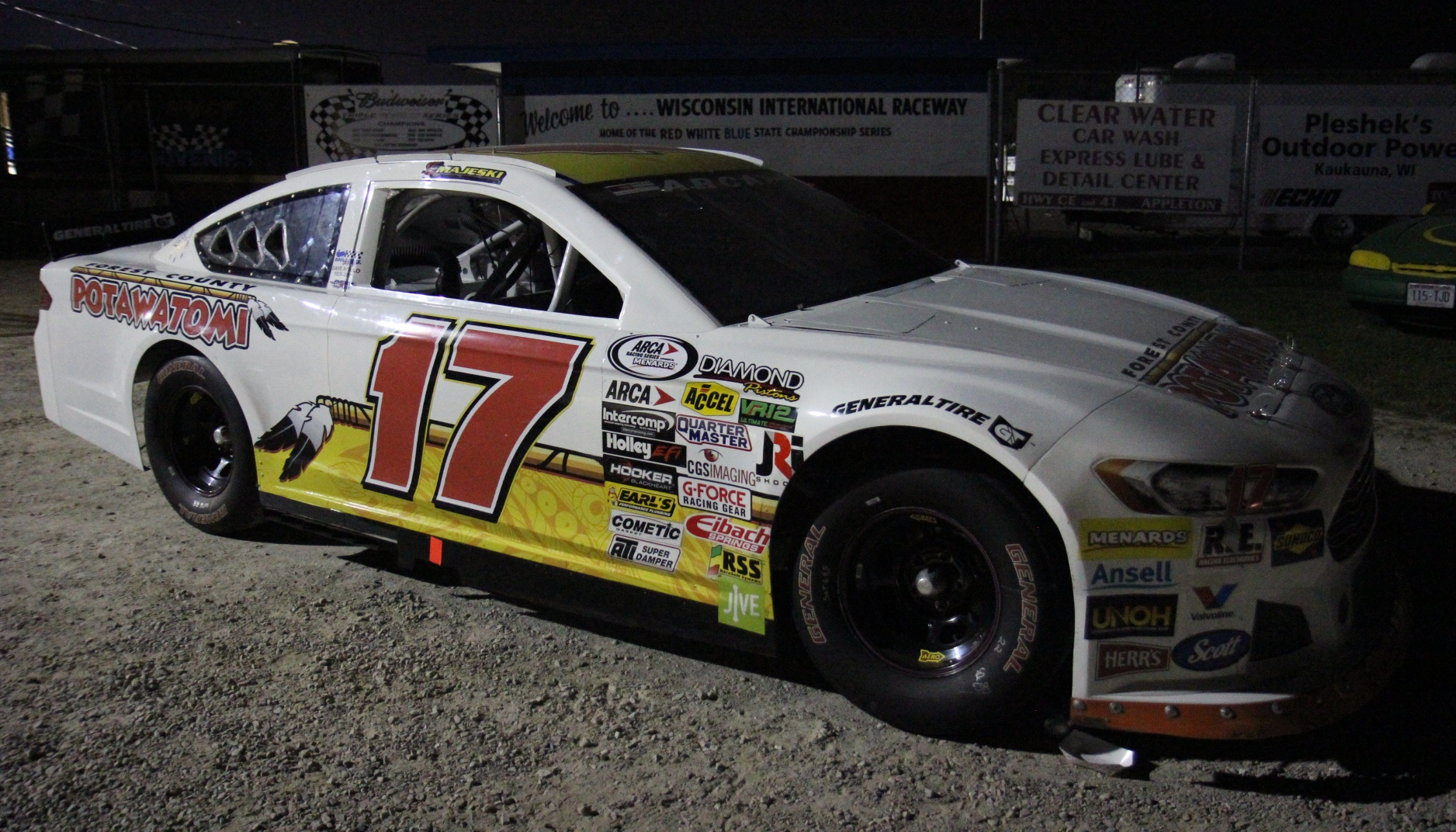
A composite-body Ford Fusion driven by Ty Majeski in 2016.

On November 4, 2014, at the SEMA Show in Las Vegas, NASCAR president Mike Helton unveiled a new body style for the K&N Pro Series East and West that would also be eligible for use in ARCA competition, based on the Sprint Cup Series Gen 6 models of the Holden VF Commodore, Ford Fusion, and Toyota Camry (no Dodge option was offered due to a lack of factory support). The new body, developed with Five Star Race Car Bodies, is constructed of a composite laminate blend and designed with easily replaceable body panels, to reduce the costs of fabrication, and to eliminate on-track debris after accidents. The composite body is also significantly lighter than traditional steel bodies. The composite body debuted at preseason testing at Daytona, with the intent of approving it for tracks over a mile in length.

The body style was made eligible in the 2015 ARCA season only on tracks one mile or shorter in length, with the traditional steel bodies running alongside. The composite bodies made their superspeedway debut at Pocono Raceway on June 3, 2016. In 2018, ARCA began to phase out the Steel bodies, mandating all composite bodies at Daytona and Talladega. They were then mandated for all tracks over 3/4 mile (1.2 km) in 2019, and all tracks in 2020. The Gen-4 style bodies were allowed to compete in one final race at the 2020 General Tire 100 at the Daytona Road Course. In 2022, the Ford Fusion was replaced by the Ford Mustang, but was not widely adopted by Ford teams until 2023. The Ford Fusion body is still legal under ARCA rules as of 2024, however only smaller teams compete with them.

=== Specifications ===
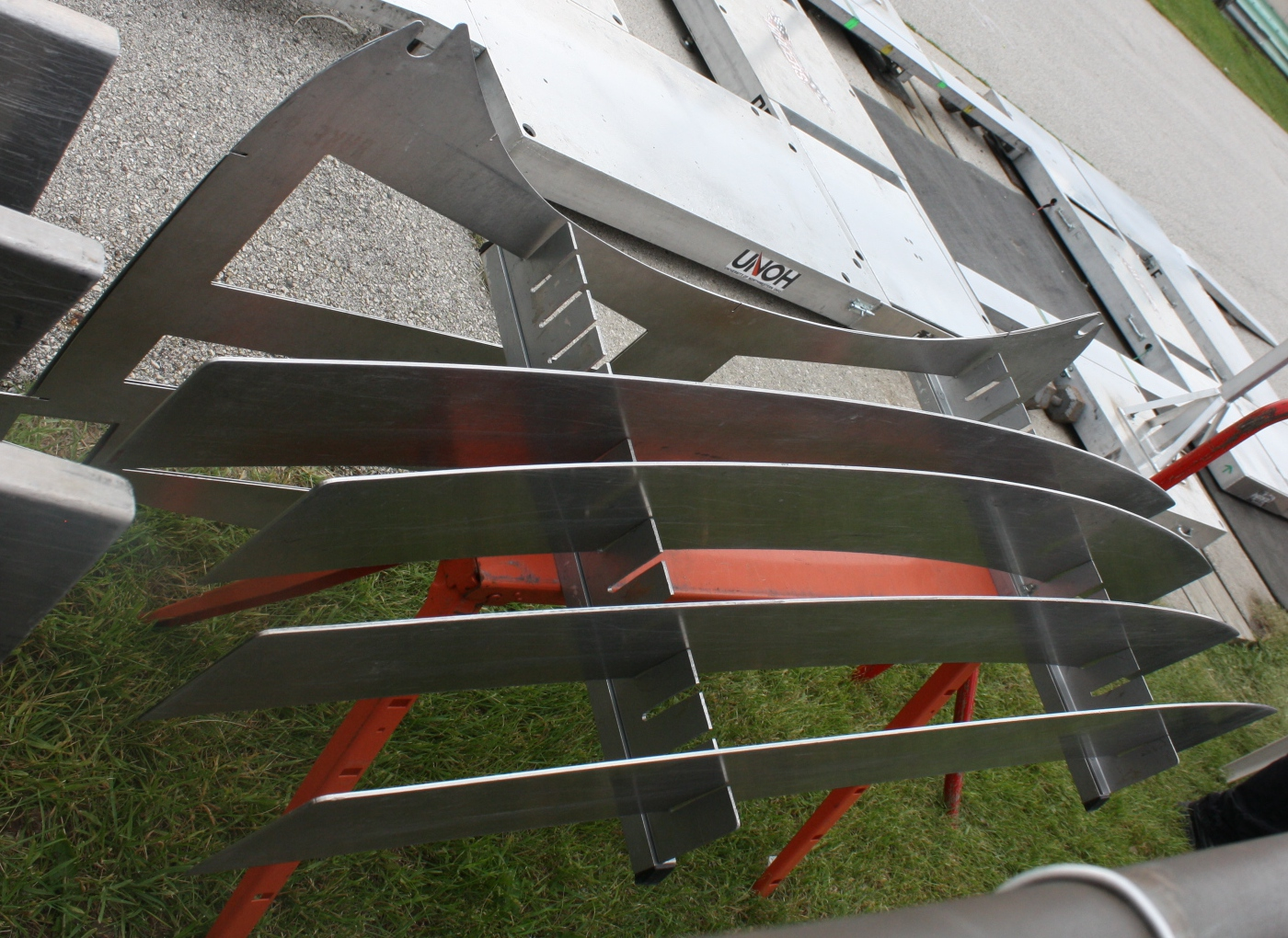
The templates for Gen-4 ARCA cars at Road America in 2013.

- Engine displacement: 350–360–396 cubic inches (5,740–5,900–6,490 cc) Overhead valve V8
- Transmission: 4-speed manual
- Weight: 3,400 lb (1,500 kg) minimum (steel); 3,300 lb (1,500 kg) (composite); without driver
- Power output: ~700 brake horsepower (520 kW) unrestricted
- Fuel: Sunoco unleaded gasoline
- Fuel capacity: 18 US gallons (68 L; 15 imp gal) or 22 US gallons (83 L; 18 imp gal)
- Fuel delivery:
  - Fuel injection – Ilmor only
  - Carburetion – All other engines
- Compression ratio: 12:1
- Aspiration: Naturally aspirated
- Wheelbase:
  - 105 inches (2,700 mm) – except restrictor plate tracks
  - 110 inches (2,800 mm) – all tracks
- Car body:
  - Steel (Gen 4) – Fit to templates (no longer eligible as of 2020)
  - Composite (Gen 6) – Unmodified (2014 Holden Commodore, 2014 Ford Fusion, 2014 Toyota Camry, 2022 Ford Mustang)
- Rear spoiler: Minimum angle 65 degrees (steel); 70 degrees (composite)
- Steering: Power, recirculating ball

== Seasons ==
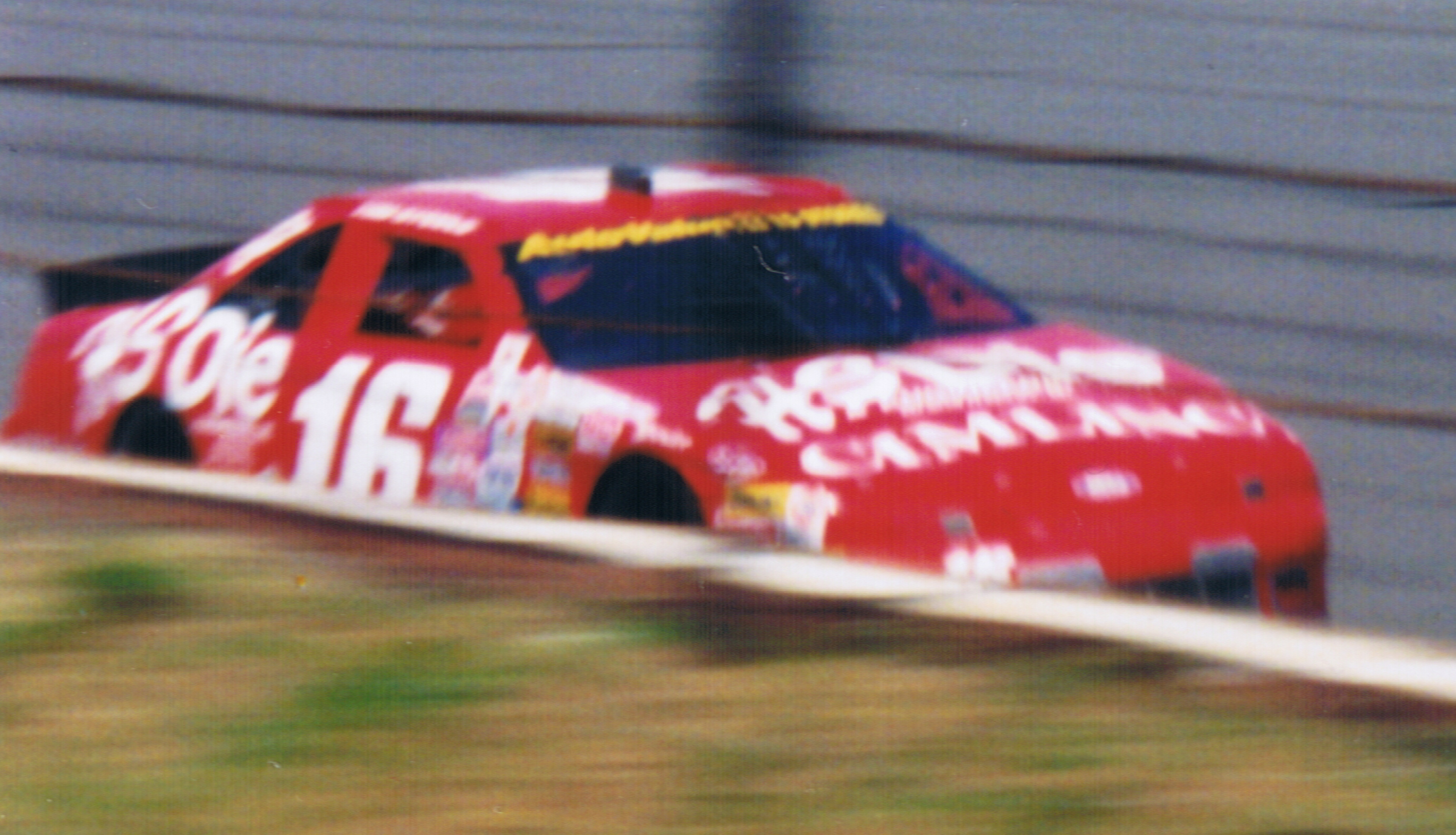
Tim Steele during the Pocono ARCA race June 1996. Steele would win the championship that year.

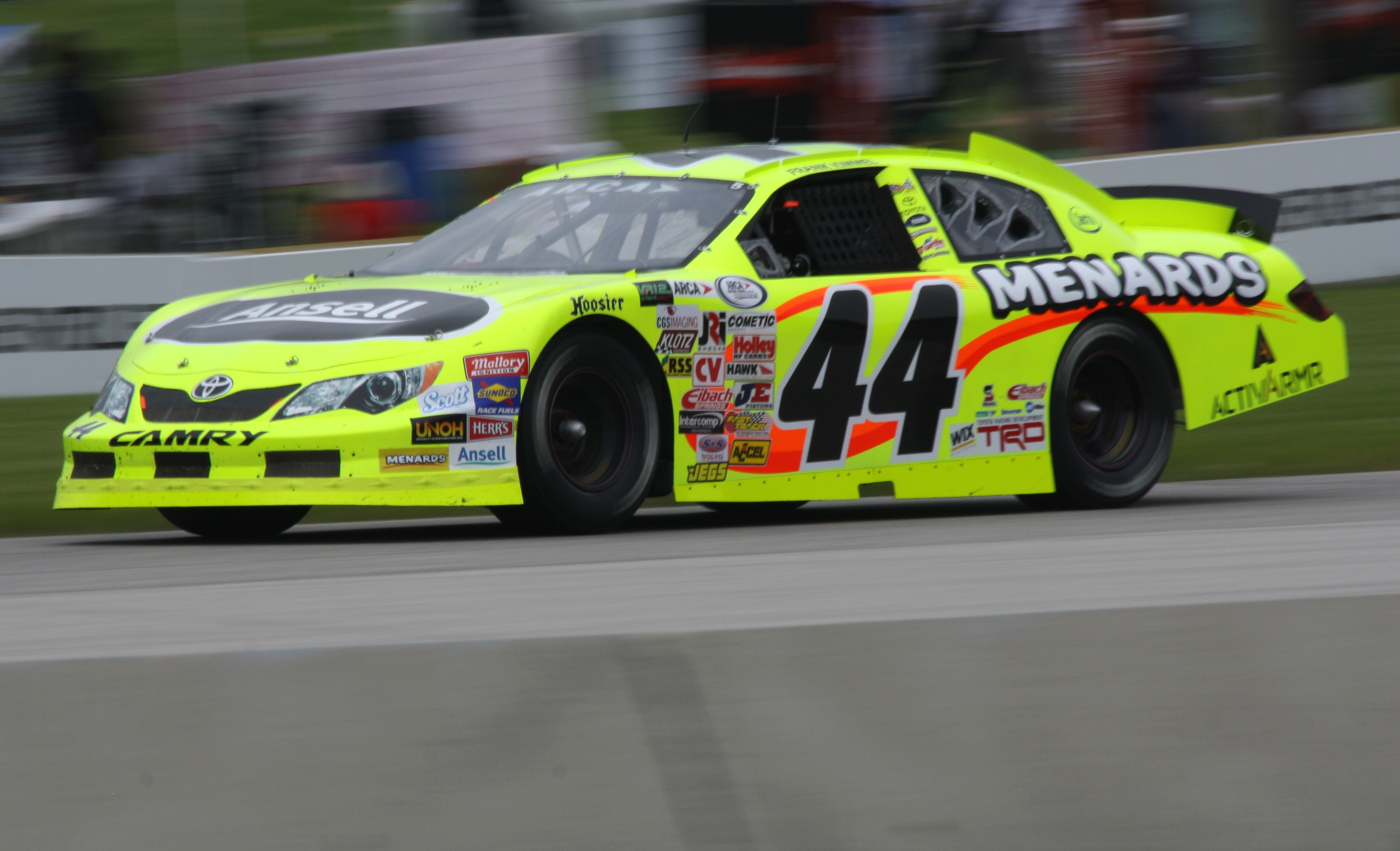
10-time champion Frank Kimmel in his Menards/Ansell Toyota Camry in 2013.

Below is the list of all-time ARCA Racing Series champions, along with the Rookie of the Year and Bill France Four Crown award winners.

The Rookie of the Year award – currently sponsored by Scott Paper Company – is given to the rookie that scores the most points at the end of the season. Winners have included future NASCAR drivers Benny Parsons, Davey Allison, Jeremy Mayfield, Michael McDowell, and Parker Kligerman.

The Bill France Four Crown award, inaugurated in 1984, is a prize given to the driver with the most points at four specific events, combining dirt ovals, short ovals, superspeedways and road courses. The award was known as the Bill France Triple Crown prior to 2009, when the road course component was added to the competition. Future Winston Cup Series star Davey Allison won the first Four Crown. Frank Kimmel is the top Bill France Four Crown winner with seven titles.

Other awards include the Superspeedway Challenge (Owners only), the Short Track Challenge (Drivers only), the Pole Award (most poles), the Marcum Award, the ARCA Motorsports Media Award, the Bob Loga Memorial Scholarship, the Spirit Award, Most Popular Driver Award, Most Improved Driver, and Engine Mechanic of the Year.

Year	Drivers Champion	Rookie of the Year	Bill France Four Crown
2026	Thomas Annunziata	Jake Bollman	Ryan Vargas
2025	Brenden Queen	Brenden Queen	Brenden Queen
2024	Andrés Pérez de Lara	Lavar Scott	Andrés Pérez de Lara
2023	Jesse Love	Jesse Love	Andrés Pérez de Lara
2022	Nick Sanchez	Daniel Dye	Daniel Dye
2021	Ty Gibbs	Nick Sanchez	Ty Gibbs
2020	Bret Holmes	Hailie Deegan	Bret Holmes
2019	Christian Eckes	Tommy Vigh Jr.	Bret Holmes
2018	Sheldon Creed	Zane Smith	Zane Smith
2017	Austin Theriault	Riley Herbst	Austin Theriault
2016	Chase Briscoe	Dalton Sargeant	Chase Briscoe
2015	Grant Enfinger	Kyle Weatherman	Kyle Weatherman
2014	Mason Mitchell	Austin Wayne Self	Grant Enfinger
2013	Frank Kimmel	Justin Boston	Frank Kimmel
2012	Chris Buescher	Alex Bowman	Chris Buescher
2011	Ty Dillon	Chris Buescher	Chad McCumbee
2010	Patrick Sheltra	Dakoda Armstrong	Joey Coulter
2009	Justin Lofton	Parker Kligerman	Parker Kligerman
2008	Justin Allgaier	Matt Carter	Frank Kimmel
2007	Frank Kimmel	Michael McDowell	Frank Kimmel
2006	Frank Kimmel	Blake Bjorklund	Blake Bjorklund
2005	Frank Kimmel	Joey Miller	Frank Kimmel
2004	Frank Kimmel	T. J. Bell	Brent Sherman
2003	Frank Kimmel	Bill Eversole	Jason Jarrett
2002	Frank Kimmel	Chad Blount	Frank Kimmel
2001	Frank Kimmel	Jason Jarrett	Frank Kimmel
2000	Frank Kimmel	Brian Ross	Tim Steele
1999	Bill Baird	Ron Cox	Bill Baird
1998	Frank Kimmel	Bill Baird	Frank Kimmel
1997	Tim Steele	Josh Baltes	Tim Steele
1996	Tim Steele	Blaise Alexander	Tim Steele
1995	Andy Hillenburg	Dill Whittymore; Harris DeVane	Harris DeVane
1994	Bobby Bowsher	Gary Bradberry	Bob Hill
1993	Tim Steele	Jeremy Mayfield	Bob Keselowski
1992	Bobby Bowsher	Frank Kimmel	Bobby Bowsher
1991	Bill Venturini	Roy Payne	Bobby Bowsher; Bill Venturini
1990	Bob Brevak	Glenn Brewer	Bob Keselowski
1989	Bob Keselowski	Graham Taylor	Tracy Leslie
1988	Tracy Leslie	Bobby Gerhart	Grant Adcox
1987	Bill Venturini	Dave Weltmeyer	Grant Adcox
1986	Lee Raymond	Mark Gibson	Lee Raymond
1985	Lee Raymond	David Simko	Lee Raymond
1984	Bob Dotter	Davey Allison	Davey Allison
1983	Bob Dotter	Bill Venturini	
1982	Scott Stovall	Lee Raymond	
1981	Larry Moyer	Gordon Blankenship	
1980	Bob Dotter	Scott Stovall	
1979	Marvin Smith	Steve Ellis	
1978	Marvin Smith	Bob Slawinski	
1977	Conan Myers	Bill Green	
1976	Dave Dayton	Tom Meinberg	
1975	Dave Dayton	Charlie Paxton	
1974	Ron Hutcherson; Dave Dayton	Jerry Hufflin	
1973	Ron Hutcherson	Bruce Gould	
1972	Ron Hutcherson	Delmar Clark	
1971	Ramo Stott	A. Arnold	
1970	Ramo Stott	Tom Bowsher	
1969	Benny Parsons	Larry Ashley	
1968	Benny Parsons	Cliff Hamm	
1967	Iggy Katona	Norm Meyers	
1966	Iggy Katona	Dave Dayton	
1965	Jack Bowsher	Benny Parsons	
1964	Jack Bowsher	Charlie Glotzbach	
1963	Jack Bowsher	—N/a	
1962	Iggy Katona	Curly Mills	
1961	Harold Smith	Virgil Oakes	
1960	Nelson Stacy	—N/a	
1959	Nelson Stacy	Bob Bower	
1958	Nelson Stacy	Paul Wensink	
1957	Iggy Katona	Bill Granger	
1956	Iggy Katona		
1955	Iggy Katona		
1954	Bucky Sager		
1953	Jim Romine		

- Bold driver indicates he/she has won at least 1 NASCAR Cup Series championship.
- Italicized driver indicates he/she has won at least 1 NASCAR O'Reilly Auto Parts Series championship.

== All-time win table ==
All figures correct as of the Menards 150 at Kansas Speedway (September 25, 2026).

Key
*	ARCA Menards Series champion
#	Driver is competing full-time in the 2026 season
°	Driver is competing part-time in the 2026 season
^	Driver has been inducted into the Motorsports Hall of Fame of America, or a Hall of Fame representing NASCAR or the Indianapolis Motor Speedway).

Rank	Driver	Wins
1	Frank Kimmel*	80
2	Iggy Katona*	79
3	Jack Bowsher*	53
4	Nelson Stacy*	43
5	Tim Steele*	41
6	Les Snow	35
7	Ramo Stott*	27
8	Bob Keselowski*	24
9	Harold Smith*	23
10	Jack Farris	21
10	Marvin Smith*	21
12	Bobby Watson	20
12	Andy Hampton	20
14	Bob Schacht	19
15	Ken Schrader	18
15	Ty Gibbs*	18
17	Bob James	17
17	Bruce Gould	17
17	Bobby Bowsher*	17
20	Jim Romine*	16
20	Benny Parsons*	16
20	Bob Strait	16
20	Grant Enfinger*	16
24	Dave Weltmeyer	13
24	William Sawalich	13
26	Dick Freeman	12
26	Ron Hutcherson*	12
26	Bill Venturini*	12
26	Jesse Love*	12
30	Jack Harrison	11
30	Ernie Derr	11
30	Fred Lorenzen	11
30	Don White	11
34	Russ Hepler	10
34	Moose Myers*	10
34	Dean Roper	10
34	Parker Kligerman	10
34	Chris Buescher*	10
34	Chandler Smith	10
40	Darel Dieringer	9
40	Tom Bowsher	9
40	Grant Adcox	9
40	Tracy Leslie*	9
40	Bobby Gerhart	9
40	Ty Dillon*	9
40	Michael Self	9
40	Corey Heim	9
48	Jack Shanklin	8
48	Charlie Glotzbach	8
48	Dave Dayton*	8
48	Davey Allison	8
48	Jimmy Horton	8
48	Jeff Purvis	8
48	Chad Blount	8
48	Justin Allgaier*	8
48	Austin Theriault*	8
48	Brandon Jones	8
48	Brenden Queen*	8
59	Jim Cushman	7
59	Lee Raymond*	7
59	Justin Lofton*	7
59	Christian Eckes*	7
59	Max Reaves	7
63	Elmer Musgrave	6
63	Paul Parks	6
63	Earl Balmer	6
63	Ralph Latham	6
63	Bob Dotter*	6
63	Ed Hage	6
63	Mike Wallace	6
63	Bill Baird*	6
63	Ryan Hemphill	6
63	Tom Hessert	6
63	Brennan Poole	6
63	Alex Bowman	6
63	Chase Briscoe*	6
63	Sammy Smith	6
63	Brent Crews	6
79	Hershel White	5
79	A. Arnold	5
79	Woody Fisher	5
79	Bob Brevak*	5
79	Billy Thomas	5
79	Joey Miller	5
79	Sam Mayer	5
79	Connor Zilisch	5
87	Curtis Turner	4
87	Jesse Baird	4
87	LaMarr Marshall	4
87	Bill Green	4
87	Bobby Jacks	4
87	Ben Hess	4
87	Bob Hill	4
87	Mark Gibson	4
87	Kerry Earnhardt	4
87	Ryan Newman	4
87	Steve Wallace	4
87	Michael McDowell	4
87	Scott Speed	4
87	Andrew Ranger	4
87	Dalton Sargeant	4
87	Zane Smith	4
87	Sheldon Creed*	4
87	Nick Sanchez*	4
87	Gio Ruggiero	4
87	Tristan McKee	4
87	Carson Brown	4
107	Bucky Sager*	3
107	Troy Ruttman	3
107	Kenny Reeder	3
107	Roy Walthen	3
107	Ken Reiter	3
107	Red Farmer	3
107	Tiny Lund	3
107	Bill Kimmel Sr.	3
107	Joe Ruttman	3
107	Mickey Gibbs	3
107	Gary Bradberry	3
107	Andy Hillenburg*	3
107	Kirk Shelmerdine	3
107	Mario Gosselin	3
107	David Keith	3
107	Blaise Alexander	3
107	Kyle Busch	3
107	Shelby Howard	3
107	Casey Mears	3
107	Brian Keselowski	3
107	James Buescher	3
107	Chad McCumbee	3
107	Patrick Sheltra*	3
107	Steve Arpin	3
107	Dakota Armstrong	3
107	Corey LaJoie	3
107	Kyle Benjamin	3
107	Mason Mitchell*	3
107	Christopher Bell	3
107	Gus Dean	3
107	Justin Haley	3
107	Harrison Burton	3
107	Ty Majeski	3
107	Taylor Gray	3
107	Connor Mosack	3
142	J. H. Petty	2
142	Bob Flock	2
142	Bill Rexford	2
142	Dick Linder	2
142	Bill Lutz	2
142	Mike Klapak	2
142	Pat Kirkwood	2
142	Paul Wensink	2
142	Roz Howard	2
142	Carl O'Harold	2
142	Tom Pistone	2
142	Tony Bettenhausen	2
142	Johnny Roberts	2
142	Keith Ploughe	2
142	Jack Purcell	2
142	Butch Hartman	2
142	Bill Clemons	2
142	John Somerville	2
142	Jim Vandiver	2
142	Joy Fair	2
142	Tom Colella	2
142	Brad Malcuit	2
142	Billie Harvey	2
142	Scott Stovall*	2
142	Glenn Sears	2
142	Darrell Waltrip	2
142	Harold Fair	2
142	Eric Smith	2
142	Mark Thompson	2
142	Jason Jarrett	2
142	Damon Lusk	2
142	Blake Feese	2
142	Cale Gale	2
142	Scott Lagasse Jr.	2
142	Erik Darnell	2
142	Michael Annett	2
142	Joey Logano	2
142	Ricky Stenhouse Jr.	2
142	Kevin Swindell	2
142	John Wes Townley	2
142	Justin Boston	2
142	Todd Gilliland	2
142	Ryan Reed	2
142	Josh Williams	2
142	Riley Herbst	2
142	Ryan Unzicker	2
142	Tanner Gray	2
142	Thomas Annunziata*	2
142	Kaden Honeycutt	2
191	Leo Caldwell	1
191	Fonty Flock	1
191	Lloyd Moore	1
191	Bob Welborn	1
191	Bob Pronger	1
191	Don Olenberg	1
191	Dutch Munsinger	1
191	Joe Sykes	1
191	Carl Kiser	1
191	Kenny Wheeler	1
191	Gober Sosebee	1
191	Don O'Dell	1
191	Bill Granger	1
191	Bob Hunter	1
191	Jerry Unser	1
191	Jimmy Bryan	1
191	Johnnie Parsons	1
191	Roy Gemberling	1
191	Red Duvall	1
191	Charlie Mincey	1
191	George Henderson	1
191	Frankie Schnieder	1
191	Bill Forney	1
191	Rodger Ward	1
191	Johny Allen	1
191	Norm Nelson	1
191	Bill Cheesebourg	1
191	Harlan Richardson	1
191	Homer Newland	1
191	Dick Hutcherson	1
191	Bob Reynolds	1
191	Buddy Ward	1
191	Wimpy May	1
191	Tom Dill	1
191	Jack Lawernce	1
191	Neil Castles	1
191	Elmer Davis	1
191	Herb Shannon	1
191	Wayne Fisher	1
191	Jay Wyatt	1
191	Jim Robinson	1
191	Ross Smith	1
191	Leonard Blanchard	1
191	Ed Mitchell	1
191	Charlie Blanton	1
191	Bob Senneker	1
191	Jeff Faber	1
191	Wayne Watercutter	1
191	Dave Sorg	1
191	Bobby Allison	1
191	Lennie Pond	1
191	Johnny Halford	1
191	Coo Coo Marlin	1
191	Larry LaMay	1
191	Jim Sauter	1
191	Bruce Hill	1
191	Kyle Petty	1
191	Joe Raymond	1
191	Sandy Satullo	1
191	John Rezek	1
191	Phil Parsons	1
191	Tim Richmond	1
191	Larry Moyer*	1
191	Mark Martin	1
191	Jim Vaughan	1
191	Rick Rowland	1
191	Farrel Harris	1
191	Mike Porter	1
191	Rick Wilson	1
191	Bosco Lowe	1
191	Terry Stineman	1
191	David Goldsberry	1
191	Howard Rose	1
191	Kirk Bryant	1
191	Terry Parsons	1
191	Ralph Jones	1
191	Michael Waltrip	1
191	Larry Moore	1
191	Ernie Irvan	1
191	Jerry Churchill	1
191	Greg Trammell	1
191	Dave Mader III	1
191	Stanley Smith	1
191	Dick Trickle	1
191	Roy Payne	1
191	Eddie Bierschwale	1
191	David Green	1
191	Loy Allen Jr.	1
191	Jeremy Mayfield	1
191	Scott Lagasse Sr.	1
191	Randy Churchill	1
191	Scott Neal	1
191	Ed Dixon	1
191	Tobey Butler	1
191	Ron Barfield	1
191	Joe Bessey	1
191	Gary Laton	1
191	Harris DeVane	1
191	Kenny Irwin	1
191	Adam Petty	1
191	Mike Swaim Jr.	1
191	Robbie Pyle	1
191	Jeff Finley	1
191	Ron Hornaday	1
191	Lyndon Amick	1
191	Billy Bigley Jr.	1
191	John Finger	1
191	Ed Berrier	1
191	Jeff Fultz	1
191	Fred Campbell	1
191	Casey Atwood	1
191	Keith Segars	1
191	Chase Montgomery	1
191	Tony Stewart	1
191	Paul Menard	1
191	Scott Riggs	1
191	Reed Sorenson	1
191	Kyle Krisiloff	1
191	David Ragan	1
191	Travis Kvapil	1
191	Dawayne Bryan	1
191	Kraig Kinser	1
191	Stephen Leicht	1
191	Billy Venturini	1
191	Chase Miller	1
191	David Stremme	1
191	Brad Coleman	1
191	Brent Sherman	1
191	Phil Bozell	1
191	Chuck Barnes Jr.	1
191	Blake Bjorklund	1
191	Billy Leslie	1
191	Ken Butler III	1
191	Jeremy Clements	1
191	Bryan Clauson	1
191	Matt Hawkins	1
191	Matt Carter	1
191	Sean Caisse	1
191	Patrick Long	1
191	Justin Marks	1
191	Craig Goess	1
191	Mikey Kile	1
191	Max Gresham	1
191	Robb Brent	1
191	Joey Coulter	1
191	Casey Roderick	1
191	Tim George Jr.	1
191	Matt Merrell	1
191	Brandon McReynolds	1
191	Chad Hackenbracht	1
191	Chase Elliott	1
191	Erik Jones	1
191	Kyle Larson	1
191	Justin Allison	1
191	Spencer Gallagher	1
191	Blake Jones	1
191	Kyle Weatherman	1
191	Trevor Bayne	1
191	Ross Kenseth	1
191	Austin Wayne Self	1
191	Travis Braden	1
191	Cole Custer	1
191	A. J. Fike	1
191	Myatt Snider	1
191	Austin Cindric	1
191	Chad Finley	1
191	Joe Graf Jr.	1
191	Logan Seavey	1
191	Drew Dollar	1
191	Bret Holmes*	1
191	Daniel Dye	1
191	Landen Lewis	1
191	Greg Van Alst	1
191	Tyler Reif	1
191	Tyler Ankrum	1
191	Luke Fenhaus	1
191	Jake Finch	1
191	Lawless Alan	1
191	Austin Green	1
191	Treyten Lapcevich	1
191	Andy Jankowiak	1

== See also ==
- List of ARCA drivers
- ARCA Menards Series East
- ARCA Menards Series West
- List of NASCAR series
- List of auto racing tracks in the United States
