= 1990 Champion Spark Plug 400 =

19th race of the 1990 NASCAR Winston Cup Series

Race details
- Race 19 of 29 in the 1990 NASCAR Winston Cup Series
- The 1990 Champion Spark Plug 400 program cover, featuring Michael Waltrip, Geoff Bodine, and Mark Martin. Artwork by NASCAR artist Sam Bass.
- Date: August 19, 1990
- Official name: 21st Annual Champion Spark Plug 400
- Location: Brooklyn, Michigan, Michigan International Speedway
- Course: Permanent racing facility
- Course length: 2 miles (3.2 km)
- Distance: 200 laps, 400 mi (643.737 km)
- Scheduled distance: 200 laps, 400 mi (643.737 km)
- Average speed: 138.822 miles per hour (223.412 km/h)
- Attendance: 60,000

Pole position
Driver	Alan Kulwicki	AK Racing
- Time: 41.147

Most laps led
Driver	Mark Martin	Roush Racing
- Laps: 72

Winner
No. 6	Mark Martin	Roush Racing

Television in the United States
- Network: ESPN
- Announcers: Bob Jenkins, Ned Jarrett, Benny Parsons

Radio in the United States
- Radio: Motor Racing Network

The 1990 Champion Spark Plug 400 was the 19th stock car race of the 1990 NASCAR Winston Cup Series season and the 21st iteration of the event. The race was held on Sunday, August 19, 1990, before an audience of 60,000 in Brooklyn, Michigan, at Michigan International Speedway, a two-mile (3.2 km) moderate-banked D-shaped speedway. The race took the scheduled 200 laps to complete. At race's end, Roush Racing driver Mark Martin would manage to dominate the late stages of the race to take his third career NASCAR Winston Cup Series victory and his second victory of the season. To fill out the top three, Hendrick Motorsports driver Greg Sacks and Blue Max Racing driver Rusty Wallace would finish second and third, respectively.

== Background ==
The layout of Michigan International Speedway, the venue where the race was held.

The race was held at Michigan International Speedway, a two-mile (3.2 km) moderate-banked D-shaped speedway located in Brooklyn, Michigan. The track is used primarily for NASCAR events. It is known as a "sister track" to Texas World Speedway as MIS's oval design was a direct basis of TWS, with moderate modifications to the banking in the corners, and was used as the basis of Auto Club Speedway. The track is owned by International Speedway Corporation. Michigan International Speedway is recognized as one of motorsports' premier facilities because of its wide racing surface and high banking (by open-wheel standards; the 18-degree banking is modest by stock car standards).

=== Entry list ===
- (R) denotes rookie driver.

#	Driver	Team	Make
1	Terry Labonte	Precision Products Racing	Oldsmobile
3	Dale Earnhardt	Richard Childress Racing	Chevrolet
4	Ernie Irvan	Morgan–McClure Motorsports	Oldsmobile
5	Ricky Rudd	Hendrick Motorsports	Chevrolet
6	Mark Martin	Roush Racing	Ford
7	Alan Kulwicki	AK Racing	Ford
8	Bobby Hillin Jr.	Stavola Brothers Racing	Buick
9	Bill Elliott	Melling Racing	Ford
10	Derrike Cope	Whitcomb Racing	Chevrolet
11	Geoff Bodine	Junior Johnson & Associates	Ford
12	Hut Stricklin	Bobby Allison Motorsports	Buick
15	Morgan Shepherd	Bud Moore Engineering	Ford
17	Greg Sacks	Hendrick Motorsports	Chevrolet
19	Chad Little	Little Racing	Ford
20	Rob Moroso (R)	Moroso Racing	Oldsmobile
21	Dale Jarrett	Wood Brothers Racing	Ford
22	Rick Mast	U.S. Racing	Pontiac
25	Ken Schrader	Hendrick Motorsports	Chevrolet
26	Brett Bodine	King Racing	Buick
27	Rusty Wallace	Blue Max Racing	Pontiac
28	Davey Allison	Robert Yates Racing	Ford
30	Michael Waltrip	Bahari Racing	Pontiac
33	Harry Gant	Leo Jackson Motorsports	Oldsmobile
34	Charlie Glotzbach	AAG Racing	Pontiac
35	Bill Venturini	Venturini Motorsports	Chevrolet
42	Kyle Petty	SABCO Racing	Pontiac
43	Richard Petty	Petty Enterprises	Pontiac
47	Jack Pennington (R)	Close Racing	Oldsmobile
48	Ben Hess	Winkle Motorsports	Pontiac
50	Ted Musgrave	RaDiUs Motorsports	Chevrolet
52	Jimmy Means	Jimmy Means Racing	Pontiac
57	Jimmy Spencer	Osterlund Racing	Pontiac
66	Dick Trickle	Cale Yarborough Motorsports	Pontiac
68	Mike Chase	TriStar Motorsports	Pontiac
71	Dave Marcis	Marcis Auto Racing	Chevrolet
72	Tracy Leslie	Parker Racing	Oldsmobile
75	Rick Wilson	RahMoc Enterprises	Pontiac
77	Ken Ragan	Ragan Racing	Ford
89	Rodney Combs	Mueller Brothers Racing	Pontiac
90	Buddy Baker	Donlavey Racing	Ford
91	Ed Cooper	Ed Cooper Racing	Oldsmobile
94	Sterling Marlin	Hagan Racing	Oldsmobile
98	Butch Miller	Travis Carter Enterprises	Chevrolet

== Qualifying ==
Qualifying was split into two rounds. The first round was held on Saturday, August 18, at 11:00 AM EST. Each driver would have one lap to set a time. During the first round, the top 20 drivers in the round would be guaranteed a starting spot in the race. If a driver was not able to guarantee a spot in the first round, they had the option to scrub their time from the first round and try and run a faster lap time in a second round qualifying run, held on Saturday, August 18, at 1:30 PM EST. As with the first round, each driver would have one lap to set a time. For this specific race, positions 21-40 would be decided on time, and depending on who needed it, a select amount of positions were given to cars who had not otherwise qualified but were high enough in owner's points; up to two were given.

Alan Kulwicki, driving for his own AK Racing team, would win the pole, setting a time of 41.147 and an average speed of 174.982 miles per hour (281.606 km/h) in the first round.

Two drivers would fail to qualify.

=== Full qualifying results ===
Pos.	#	Driver	Team	Make	Time	Speed
1	7	Alan Kulwicki	AK Racing	Ford	41.147	174.982
2	9	Bill Elliott	Melling Racing	Ford	41.265	174.482
3	4	Ernie Irvan	Morgan–McClure Motorsports	Chevrolet	41.304	174.317
4	94	Sterling Marlin	Hagan Racing	Oldsmobile	41.402	173.905
5	6	Mark Martin	Roush Racing	Ford	41.484	173.561
6	27	Rusty Wallace	Blue Max Racing	Pontiac	41.503	173.481
7	3	Dale Earnhardt	Richard Childress Racing	Chevrolet	41.515	173.431
8	17	Greg Sacks	Hendrick Motorsports	Chevrolet	41.539	173.331
9	11	Geoff Bodine	Junior Johnson & Associates	Ford	41.556	173.260
10	28	Davey Allison	Robert Yates Racing	Ford	41.572	173.193
11	33	Harry Gant	Leo Jackson Motorsports	Oldsmobile	41.573	173.189
12	26	Brett Bodine	King Racing	Buick	41.649	172.873
13	10	Derrike Cope	Whitcomb Racing	Chevrolet	41.674	172.770
14	19	Chad Little	Little Racing	Ford	41.732	172.529
15	66	Dick Trickle	Cale Yarborough Motorsports	Pontiac	41.740	172.496
16	21	Dale Jarrett	Wood Brothers Racing	Ford	41.814	172.191
17	8	Bobby Hillin Jr.	Stavola Brothers Racing	Buick	41.821	172.162
18	42	Kyle Petty	SABCO Racing	Pontiac	41.838	172.092
19	75	Rick Wilson	RahMoc Enterprises	Oldsmobile	41.839	172.088
20	12	Hut Stricklin	Bobby Allison Motorsports	Buick	41.856	172.018
Failed to lock in Round 1
21	15	Morgan Shepherd	Bud Moore Engineering	Ford	41.887	171.891
22	43	Richard Petty	Petty Enterprises	Pontiac	41.888	171.887
23	89	Rodney Combs	Mueller Brothers Racing	Pontiac	41.892	171.871
24	50	Ted Musgrave	RaDiUs Motorsports	Chevrolet	41.892	171.871
25	52	Jimmy Means	Jimmy Means Racing	Pontiac	41.909	171.801
26	20	Rob Moroso (R)	Moroso Racing	Oldsmobile	41.921	171.752
27	68	Mike Chase	TriStar Motorsports	Pontiac	41.940	171.674
28	48	Ben Hess	Winkle Motorsports	Pontiac	41.943	171.662
29	47	Jack Pennington (R)	Close Racing	Oldsmobile	41.958	171.600
30	90	Buddy Baker	Donlavey Racing	Ford	41.984	171.494
31	35	Bill Venturini	Venturini Motorsports	Chevrolet	42.014	171.371
32	22	Rick Mast	U.S. Racing	Pontiac	42.045	171.245
33	77	Ken Ragan	Ragan Racing	Ford	42.069	171.147
34	30	Michael Waltrip	Bahari Racing	Pontiac	42.074	171.127
35	25	Ken Schrader	Hendrick Motorsports	Chevrolet	42.122	170.932
36	1	Terry Labonte	Precision Products Racing	Oldsmobile	42.182	170.689
37	91	Ed Cooper	Ed Cooper Racing	Oldsmobile	42.190	170.657
38	98	Butch Miller	Travis Carter Enterprises	Chevrolet	42.247	170.426
39	5	Ricky Rudd	Hendrick Motorsports	Chevrolet	42.284	170.277
40	57	Jimmy Spencer	Osterlund Racing	Pontiac	42.378	169.899
Provisional
41	71	Dave Marcis	Marcis Auto Racing	Chevrolet	42.629	168.899
Failed to qualify
42	72	Tracy Leslie	Parker Racing	Oldsmobile	42.472	169.523
43	34	Charlie Glotzbach	AAG Racing	Pontiac	43.675	164.854
Official starting lineup

== Race results ==
Fin	St	#	Driver	Team	Make	Laps	Led	Status	Pts	Winnings
1	5	6	Mark Martin	Roush Racing	Ford	200	72	running	185	$71,200
2	8	17	Greg Sacks	Hendrick Motorsports	Chevrolet	200	4	running	175	$41,600
3	6	27	Rusty Wallace	Blue Max Racing	Pontiac	200	32	running	170	$33,900
4	2	9	Bill Elliott	Melling Racing	Ford	200	22	running	165	$27,000
5	39	5	Ricky Rudd	Hendrick Motorsports	Chevrolet	200	0	running	155	$20,607
6	10	28	Davey Allison	Robert Yates Racing	Ford	200	0	running	150	$19,325
7	9	11	Geoff Bodine	Junior Johnson & Associates	Ford	200	3	running	151	$18,750
8	7	3	Dale Earnhardt	Richard Childress Racing	Chevrolet	200	50	running	147	$19,400
9	21	15	Morgan Shepherd	Bud Moore Engineering	Ford	200	1	running	143	$13,550
10	16	21	Dale Jarrett	Wood Brothers Racing	Ford	200	0	running	134	$14,825
11	1	7	Alan Kulwicki	AK Racing	Ford	200	0	running	130	$13,000
12	38	98	Butch Miller	Travis Carter Enterprises	Chevrolet	200	0	running	127	$9,600
13	11	33	Harry Gant	Leo Jackson Motorsports	Oldsmobile	200	0	running	124	$14,300
14	36	1	Terry Labonte	Precision Products Racing	Oldsmobile	200	0	running	121	$10,900
15	20	12	Hut Stricklin	Bobby Allison Motorsports	Buick	200	0	running	118	$9,075
16	18	42	Kyle Petty	SABCO Racing	Pontiac	200	1	running	120	$13,250
17	12	26	Brett Bodine	King Racing	Buick	200	9	running	117	$11,900
18	41	71	Dave Marcis	Marcis Auto Racing	Chevrolet	199	1	running	114	$9,150
19	13	10	Derrike Cope	Whitcomb Racing	Chevrolet	199	0	running	106	$10,650
20	4	94	Sterling Marlin	Hagan Racing	Oldsmobile	199	0	running	103	$9,450
21	17	8	Bobby Hillin Jr.	Stavola Brothers Racing	Buick	198	0	running	100	$8,225
22	14	19	Chad Little	Little Racing	Ford	198	0	running	97	$5,125
23	30	90	Buddy Baker	Donlavey Racing	Ford	198	0	running	94	$5,025
24	27	68	Mike Chase	TriStar Motorsports	Pontiac	198	0	running	91	$4,925
25	40	57	Jimmy Spencer	Osterlund Racing	Pontiac	197	0	running	88	$7,875
26	26	20	Rob Moroso (R)	Moroso Racing	Oldsmobile	197	0	running	85	$5,425
27	25	52	Jimmy Means	Jimmy Means Racing	Pontiac	195	0	running	82	$5,475
28	31	35	Bill Venturini	Venturini Motorsports	Chevrolet	192	0	running	79	$4,575
29	19	75	Rick Wilson	RahMoc Enterprises	Oldsmobile	186	0	steering	76	$7,225
30	34	30	Michael Waltrip	Bahari Racing	Pontiac	181	0	engine	73	$7,125
31	28	48	Ben Hess	Winkle Motorsports	Pontiac	169	0	accident	70	$4,275
32	15	66	Dick Trickle	Cale Yarborough Motorsports	Pontiac	162	0	accident	67	$7,900
33	22	43	Richard Petty	Petty Enterprises	Pontiac	128	5	engine	69	$4,725
34	23	89	Rodney Combs	Mueller Brothers Racing	Pontiac	127	0	oil line	61	$4,025
35	3	4	Ernie Irvan	Morgan–McClure Motorsports	Chevrolet	113	0	engine	58	$6,775
36	32	22	Rick Mast	U.S. Racing	Pontiac	103	0	engine	55	$3,950
37	33	77	Ken Ragan	Ragan Racing	Ford	102	0	accident	52	$3,925
38	29	47	Jack Pennington (R)	Close Racing	Oldsmobile	73	0	oil pan	49	$4,150
39	24	50	Ted Musgrave	RaDiUs Motorsports	Chevrolet	65	0	valve	46	$3,890
40	35	25	Ken Schrader	Hendrick Motorsports	Chevrolet	19	0	engine	43	$10,875
41	37	91	Ed Cooper	Ed Cooper Racing	Oldsmobile	17	0	rocker arm	40	$3,875
Official race results

== Standings after the race ==
Drivers' Championship standings

	Pos	Driver	Points
	1	Mark Martin	2,854
	2	Dale Earnhardt	2,806 (-48)
	3	Geoff Bodine	2,700 (-154)
	4	Rusty Wallace	2,579 (–275)
1	5	Morgan Shepherd	2,491 (–363)
1	6	Bill Elliott	2,472 (–382)
2	7	Kyle Petty	2,451 (–403)
1	8	Ricky Rudd	2,410 (–444)
1	9	Ken Schrader	2,361 (–493)
3	10	Davey Allison	2,243 (–611)
Official driver's standings

- Note: Only the first 10 positions are included for the driver standings.

Previous race: 1990 Budweiser at The Glen	NASCAR Winston Cup Series; 1990 season	Next race: 1990 Busch 500
