= Lee Raymond (racing driver) =

American stock car racing driver (1954–2013)

- Born: October 2, 1954; Dayton, Ohio, U.S.
- Died: December 12, 2013 (aged 59); Dayton, Ohio, U.S.
- Cause of death: Lung cancer
- Achievements: 1985, 1986 ARCA SuperCar Series Champion
- Awards: 1982 ARCA SuperCar Series Rookie of the Year

NASCAR Cup Series career
- 1 race run over 1 year
- Best finish: 82nd (1989)
- First race: 1989 Daytona 500 (Daytona)
Wins	Top tens	Poles
0	0	0

NASCAR O'Reilly Auto Parts Series career
- 1 race run over 1 year
- Best finish: 106th (1985)
- First race: 1985 Kroger 200 (IRP)
Wins	Top tens	Poles
0	0	0

Lee Raymond

ARCA Hooters Cup Super Car Series
- Years active: 1979–1993
- Starts: 136
- Wins: 7
- Poles: 9
- Best finish: 1st in 1985, 1986

Championship titles
- 1985 1986: ARCA Talladega SuperCar Series; ARCA Permatex SuperCar Series

Lee Raymond (October 2, 1954 – December 12, 2013) was an American stock car racing driver. A two-time champion of the ARCA SuperCar Series, he also competed in NASCAR racing in the 1989 Daytona 500.

== Racing career ==
A resident of Dayton, Ohio, Raymond made his debut in ARCA Racing Series competition in 1979. His career in the series ran through 1993; over the course of his career he won seven races and nine poles in the series, he won the series' Rookie of the Year award in 1982, and won back to back championships in the series in 1985 and 1986.

Raymond also competed in two NASCAR-sanctioned events over the course of his career; in 1985 in a Busch Series event at Indianapolis Raceway Park, where he finished 28th, and in the Winston Cup Series in the 1989 Daytona 500, finishing 26th.

== Post-racing career ==
After his retirement from competition, Raymond was appointed director of competition at Kil-Kare Speedway. He had been inducted into the Kil-Kare Speedway and Dayton Speedway Halls of Fame. He died of lung cancer on December 12, 2013, after a brief battle illness.

== Motorsports career results ==
=== NASCAR ===
(key) (Bold - Pole position awarded by qualifying time. Italics - Pole position earned by points standings or practice time. * – Most laps led.)

==== Winston Cup Series ====
NASCAR Winston Cup Series results
Year	Team	No.	Make	1	2	3	4	5	6	7	8	9	10	11	12	13	14	15	16	17	18	19	20	21	22	23	24	25	26	27	28	29	NWCC	Pts	Ref
1989	LC Racing	69	Ford	DAY; 26	CAR	ATL; DNQ	RCH	DAR	BRI	NWS	MAR	TAL	CLT	DOV	SON	POC	MCH; DNQ	DAY	POC	TAL	GLN	MCH	BRI	DAR	RCH	DOV	MAR	CLT	NWS	CAR	PHO	ATL	82nd	85	

==== Busch Series ====
NASCAR Busch Series results
Year	Team	No.	Make	1	2	3	4	5	6	7	8	9	10	11	12	13	14	15	16	17	18	19	20	21	22	23	24	25	26	27	NBSC	Pts	Ref
1985	Coyle Racing	7	Chevy	DAY	CAR	HCY	BRI	MAR	DAR	SBO	LGY	DOV	CLT	SBO	HCY	ROU	IRP; 28	SBO	LGY	HCY	MLW	BRI	DAR	RCH	NWS	ROU	CLT	HCY	CAR	MAR	106th	0	

Sporting positions
Preceded by Bob Dotter	ARCA SuperCar Series champion 1984, 1985	Succeeded by Bill Venturini
