= List of ARCA drivers =

The following is a list of drivers who are currently competing in a series sanctioned by the Automobile Racing Club of America (ARCA).

== ARCA Menards Series drivers ==
All statistics used in these tables are as of the end of the 2026 Lime Rock Park ARCA 100. (Race 12/20)

Key
Symbol	Meaning
*	Driver is currently in the Top-10 in championship standings
+	Driver is currently racing full-time in a NASCAR national series

=== Full-time drivers ===
Driver		No.	Debut	Starts	Wins	Top 5s	Top 10s	Poles	Best Points Finish
Thomas Annunziata*	(United States)	70	2024	18	2	9	15	3	31st (2024)
Jake Bollman*	(United States)	20	2024	11	0	8	11	1	111th (2024)
Alex Clubb*	(United States)	03	2015	98	0	0	6	0	6th (2025)
Bobby Dale Earnhardt*	(United States)	89	2017	17	0	0	1	0	49th (2017)
Jason Kitzmiller*	(United States)	97	2020	59	0	3	29	0	3rd (2025)
Takuma Koga*	(Japan)	12	2020	25	0	0	1	0	26th (2025)
Michael Maples*	(United States)	99	2024	52	0	0	1	0	7th (2025)
Isabella Robusto*	(United States)	55	2024	36	0	12	23	1	4th (2025)
Brad Smith*	(United States)	48	1988	474	0	0	3	0	5th (2021)

=== Part-time drivers ===
Driver		No.	Debut	Starts	Wins	Top 5s	Top 10s	Poles	Best Points Finish
Corey Aiken	(United States)	19	2025	6	0	0	0	0	51st (2025)
Jeff Anton	(United States)	44	2025	3	0	0	2	0	96th (2025)
Bryce Applegate	(United States)	34	2026	1	0	0	0	0	N/A
Jade Avedisian	(United States)	15/90	2025	5	0	0	3	0	117th (2025)
Morgen Baird	(United States)	19/91	2016	16	0	0	3	0	35th (2019)
Brian Barbarow	(United States)	34	2026	1	0	0	0	0	N/A
Gavan Boschele	(United States)	25	2024	6	0	4	5	0	82nd (2024)
Carson Brown	(United States)	28	2026	5	1	5	5	2	N/A
Landon Brown	(United States)	69	2026	1	0	0	0	0	N/A
Lanie Buice	(United States)	77	2025	8	0	4	6	1	33rd (2025)
Chase Buscaglia	(United States)	11	2026	1	0	0	0	0	N/A
Kevin Campbell	(United States)	81	2015	8	0	0	0	0	60th (2015)
Eric Caudell	(United States)	7	2015	71	0	0	3	0	10th (2017)
Andrew Chapman	(United States)	56	2026	1	0	0	0	0	N/A
John Clagett	(United States)	10	2006	3	0	0	0	0	166th (2006)
Sean Corr	(United States)	8	2024	75	0	8	18	1	9th (2011)
Sam Corry	(United States)	15	2025	4	0	1	2	0	46th (2025)
Tony Cosentino	(United States)	1	2021	35	0	0	7	0	10th (2025)
Caleb Costner	(United States)	93	2023	14	0	0	1	0	33rd (2023)
Trent Curtis	(United States)	11	2025	2	0	0	0	0	110th (2025)
Julian DaCosta	(United States)	25	2025	3	0	0	0	0	61st (2025)
Bryan Dauzat	(United States)	75	2014	30	0	0	0	0	30th (2018)
Quinn Davis	(United States)	85	2025	5	0	0	0	0	36th (2025)
Gus Dean	(United States)	25	2016	72	3	23	42	3	4th (2017)
Hailie Deegan	(United States)	16	2019	27	0	5	21	0	3rd (2020)
Cody Dennison	(United States)	01/72	2024	24	0	0	2	0	7th (2024)
Cole Denton	(United States)	41	2026	1	0	0	0	0	N/A
Hunter Deshautelle	(United States)	57	2023	8	0	0	0	0	57th (2024)
Daniel Dye	(United States)	24	2021	32	1	19	26	2	2nd (2022)
Jake Finch	(United States)	15	2022	22	1	5	14	1	18th (2024)
Ty Fredrickson	(United States)	25/91	2025	3	0	2	2	0	92nd (2025)
Stewart Friesen+	(Canada)	17	2026	1	0	0	0	0	N/A
Ryan Gemmell	(United States)	29	2024	5	0	1	5	0	58th (2025)
Rita Goulet	(United States)	13	2022	16	0	0	0	0	32nd (2023)
Bryce Haugeberg	(United States)	11	2021	27	0	0	4	0	17th (2022)
Dustin Hillenburg	(United States)	10/11	2025	5	0	0	0	0	114th (2025)
Bobby Hillis Jr.	(United States)	06	2020	4	0	0	0	0	111th (2023)
Kaden Honeycutt+	(United States)	17	2018	7	1	1	3	0	29th (2019)
Trevor Huddleston	(United States)	50	2021	5	0	1	3	0	82nd (2023)
Ryan Huff	(United States)	36	2020	22	0	1	6	0	14th (2020)
Landon S. Huffman	(United States)	9/28	2026	2	0	1	1	0	N/A
Graham Jacobson	(United States)	01	2026	1	0	0	0	0	N/A
Andy Jankowiak	(United States)	73	2023	53	1	6	27	0	12th (2025)
Eric Johnson Jr.	(United States)	5	2024	3	0	0	0	0	101st (2024, 2025)
Matt Kemp	(United States)	11/19	2023	24	0	0	2	0	16th (2025)
Robbie Kennealy	(United States)	11/41	2024	6	0	0	2	0	99th (2025)
Tyler Kicera	(United States)	91	2026	1	0	0	0	0	N/A
Will Kimmel	(United States)	69	2008	143	0	22	49	2	8th (2013)
Isaac Kitzmiller	(United States)	79	2025	9	0	1	6	0	27th (2025)
Caden Kvapil	(United States)	24	2026	1	0	1	1	0	N/A
Brayton Laster	(United States)	06	2022	39	0	0	5	0	8th (2025)
Steve Lewis Jr.	(United States)	62/79	2023	5	0	0	0	0	64th (2023)
Kenna Long	(United States)	1	2026	1	0	0	0	0	N/A
Mia Lovell	(United States)	15	2026	1	0	0	0	0	N/A
Tyler Lupton	(United States)	28	2026	1	0	0	1	0	N/A
Jeff Maconi	(United States)	86	2025	16	0	0	0	0	37th (2025)
Jeffery MacZink	(United States)	65	2009	14	0	0	1	0	60th (2022)
Robert Martin	(United States)	52	N/A	0	0	0	0	0	N/A
Mason Massey	(United States)	81	2026	1	0	1	1	0	N/A
Taylor Mayhew	(United States)	17	2026	1	0	0	1	0	N/A
Tristan McKee	(United States)	77	2025	8	2	5	6	0	25th (2025)
Jackson McLerran	(United States)	95	2026	5	0	0	0	0	65th (2025)
Garrett Mitchell	(United States)	30	2025	8	0	1	3	1	40th (2025)
Logan Misuraca	(United States)	34/86	2023	6	0	0	0	0	61st (2023)
Nate Moeller	(United States)	06/9/83	2022	31	0	0	0	0	19th (2024)
Tim Monroe	(United States)	11	2020	42	0	0	7	0	10th (2023)
Connor Mosack	(United States)	28	2026	25	3	14	18	2	16th (2022)
A. J. Moyer	(United States)	88	2021	28	0	0	2	0	7th (2024)
Willie Mullins	(United States)	3	2008	37	0	0	12	0	28th (2025)
Con Nicolopoulos	(United States)	06	2011	98	0	0	1	0	30th (2025)
Alli Owens	(United States)	68/93	2008	34	0	0	3	0	20th (2009)
Andrew Patterson	(United States)	1	2024	12	0	1	4	0	18th (2025)
Craig Pellegrini Jr.	(United States)	01/10	2026	3	0	0	1	0	N/A
Brad Perez	(United States)	10	2021	5	0	0	1	0	75th (2024)
Ed Pompa	(United States)	10	2006	98	0	0	3	0	14th (2016)
Peter Portante	(United States)	25	2026	1	0	0	0	0	N/A
Alex Quarterley	(United States)	3	2024	2	0	0	0	0	95th (2024)
Andrew Ranger	(Canada)	53	2011	9	4	8	9	3	33rd (2011)
Gavin Ray	(United States)	7	2026	1	0	0	0	0	N/A
Kole Raz	(United States)	76	2025	6	0	1	3	0	29th (2025)
Max Reaves	(United States)	18	2025	13	5	7	11	4	15th (2025)
Glen Reen	(United States)	07	2025	3	0	2	2	0	70th (2025)
Taylor Reimer	(United States)	77	2024	11	0	4	9	0	38th (2025)
Jaiden Reyna	(United States)	42	2026	1	0	0	0	0	N/A
Tim Richmond	(United States)	27	2019	63	0	1	2	0	8th (2019)
Will Robinson	(United States)	15/25	2026	2	0	0	1	0	N/A
Andrew Rocque	(United States)	1	2026	1	0	0	0	0	N/A
Gio Ruggiero+	(United States)	18	2026	18	4	15	18	2	13th (2024)
William Sawalich+	(United States)	18	2026	32	13	27	29	16	8th (2023)
Dale Shearer	(United States)	98	2008	52	0	0	0	0	32nd (2024)
George Siciliano	(United States)	0	2026	3	0	0	1	0	N/A
Wesley Slimp	(United States)	15/25/90	2026	3	0	0	2	0	N/A
David Smith	(Canada)	05	2023	4	0	0	0	0	100th (2023)
Presley Sorah	(United States)	9	2024	7	0	0	0	0	61st (2024)
Dystany Spurlock	(United States)	66	2026	4	0	0	1	0	N/A
Patrick Staropoli+	(United States)	51	2015	8	0	0	3	0	116th (2024)
Kyle Steckly	(Canada)	2	2025	4	0	0	1	0	138th (2025)
Dawson Sutton+	(United States)	42	2026	2	0	0	1	0	116th (2024)
Zachary Tinkle	(United States)	53	2021	46	0	0	5	0	8th (2022)
Monty Tipton	(United States)	17	2026	3	0	0	1	0	N/A
Tyler Tomassi	(United States)	51	2024	3	0	0	0	0	64th (2024)
Mini Tyrrell+	(United States)	17	2026	1	0	0	0	0	N/A
Greg Van Alst	(United States)	19	2002	53	1	5	26	0	5th (2022)
Ron Vandermeir Jr.	(United States)	26	2021	11	0	0	3	0	21st (2022)
Ryan Vargas	(United States)	91	2025	12	0	0	6	0	42nd (2025)
Austin Vaughn	(United States)	19/91	2024	10	0	0	1	0	30th (2025)
Christopher Werth	(United States)	72	2021	5	0	0	0	0	99th (2024)
Charles Weslowski Jr.	(United States)	32	2026	2	0	0	0	0	N/A
Derek White	(Canada)	66	2025	3	0	0	0	0	116th (2025)
Nick White	(United States)	22	2026	2	0	0	0	0	N/A
D. L. Wilson	(United States)	01	2018	39	0	0	1	0	6th (2021)
Nolan Wilson	(United States)	69	2025	2	0	0	0	0	84th (2024)
Jack Wood	(United States)	28	2021	21	0	3	13	0	99th (2025)

== ARCA Midwest Tour drivers ==
All statistics used in these tables are as of the end of the 2016 Oktoberfest 200. (Race 10/10)

=== Full-time drivers ===
Driver		No.	Debut	Starts	Wins	Top 5s	Top 10s	Poles	Best Points Finish
Ricky Baker	(United States)	52	2015	22	1	4	11	0	7th (2016)
Natalie Decker	(United States)	04	2013	13	0	1	6	0	3rd (2013)
Jonathan Eilen	(United States)	77	2007	92	5	25	46	1	1st (2012)
Casey Johnson	(United States)	47	N/A	13	0	3	7	0	3rd (2016)
Matt Kocourek	(United States)	43	N/A	44	0	1	7	0	12th (2016)
Derek Kraus	(United States)	9	2016	11	1	3	4	1	4th (2016)
Ty Majeski	(United States)	91	2013	38	13	22	24	15	1st (2014-2016)
Andrew Morrissey	(United States)	39	N/A	90	2	22	43	3	1st (2011)
Austin Nason	(United States)	14	2015	20	0	2	7	0	8th (2016)
Paul Schafer Jr.	(United States)	7	2016	17	0	5	9	0	2nd (2016)
Chris Weinkauf	(United States)	75	N/A	61	1	17	30	6	3rd (2015)
Jason Weinkauf	(United States)	76	N/A	51	1	3	12	0	10th (2016)

=== Part-time drivers ===
Driver	No.	Debut	Starts	Wins	Top 5s	Top 10s	Poles	Best Points Finish

== ARCA/CRA Super Series drivers ==
All statistics used in these tables are as of the end of the 2016 Winchester 400. (Race 13/13)

=== Full-time drivers ===
Driver	No.	Debut	Starts	Wins	Top 5s	Top 10s	Poles	Best Points Finish

=== Part-time drivers ===
Driver	No.	Debut	Starts	Wins	Top 5s	Top 10s	Poles	Best Points Finish
