= Bob Dotter =

American racing driver (1938–2003)

- Born: October 28, 1938; South Carolina, U.S.
- Died: September 1, 2003 (aged 64)
- Achievements: 1980, 1983, 1984 ARCA Racing Series Champion

NASCAR O'Reilly Auto Parts Series career
- 3 races run over 3 years
- Best finish: 97th (1985)
- First race: 1982 Kroger 200 (IRP)
- Last race: 1993 Havoline 250 (Milwaukee)
Wins	Top tens	Poles
0	0	0
- Statistics up to date as of December 8, 2012.

Bob Dotter (October 28, 1938 – September 1, 2003) was an American three-time Automobile Racing Club of America Super Car Champion driver. Winning the title in 1980, 1983 and 1984. He was born in South Carolina but moved to Chicago, Illinois when he was young. He lost his left arm in an industrial accident in the early 60s. He drove and built his own race cars despite his loss. Bob is the father of NASCAR driver-turned-SS-Green Light Racing team owner Bobby Dotter and competed in three Busch Series events in his own right, finishing a career-best seventeenth at O'Reilly Raceway Park in 1983.

Dotter died in 2003 from lung cancer.

== Motorsports career results ==
=== NASCAR ===
(key) (Bold – Pole position awarded by qualifying time. Italics – Pole position earned by points standings or practice time. * – Most laps led.)

==== Busch Series ====
NASCAR Busch Series results
Year	Team	No.	Make	1	2	3	4	5	6	7	8	9	10	11	12	13	14	15	16	17	18	19	20	21	22	23	24	25	26	27	28	29	NBSC	Pts	Ref
1982	Hahnlein Racing	76	Olds	DAY	RCH	BRI	MAR	DAR	HCY	SBO	CRW	RCH	LGY	DOV	HCY	CLT	ASH	HCY	SBO	CAR	CRW	SBO	HCY	LGY	IRP; 23	BRI	HCY	RCH	MAR	CLT	HCY	MAR	150th	94	
1985	Goudie Racing	83	Pontiac	DAY	CAR	HCY	BRI	MAR	DAR	SBO	LGY	DOV	CLT	SBO	HCY	ROU	IRP; 17	SBO	LGY	HCY	MLW	BRI	DAR	RCH	NWS	ROU	CLT	HCY	CAR	MAR			97th	0	
1993	Team R Racing	64	Olds	DAY	CAR	RCH	DAR	BRI	HCY	ROU	MAR	NZH	CLT	DOV	MYB	GLN	MLW; 35	TAL	IRP	MCH	NHA	BRI	DAR	RCH	DOV	ROU	CLT	MAR	CAR	HCY	ATL		107th	58	

=== ARCA Bondo/Mar-Hyde Series ===
(key) (Bold – Pole position awarded by qualifying time. Italics – Pole position earned by points standings or practice time. * – Most laps led.)

ARCA Bondo/Mar-Hyde Series results
Year	Team	No.	Make	1	2	3	4	5	6	7	8	9	10	11	12	13	14	15	16	17	18	19	20	21	22	23	24	25	ABSC	Pts	Ref
1979	Hahnlein Racing	76	Chevy	AVS	DAY; 19																								NA	0	
1979	Hahnlein Racing	76	Buick			NSV; 2	FRS; 3	SLM; 15	DSP	IMS; 2	TAL	FRS; 2																	NA	0	
1980	Hahnlein Racing	76	Buick	DAY; 4	NWS; 3	FRS; 2	FRS; 2	MCH; 14	TAL; 4	IMS; 5	FRS; 2	MCH; 17																	1st	1015	
1981	Hahnlein Racing	76	Olds	DAY; 35																									3rd	895	
1981	Hahnlein Racing	76	Buick		DSP; 7	FRS; 1	**FRS**; 2*	**BFS**; 2*	TAL; 13	**FRS**; 19	COR; 7																		3rd	895	
1982	Hahnlein Racing	76	Buick	NSV; 9			FRS; 2	CMS; 3	WIN; 21	NSV; 2*	TAT	TAL																	5th	945	
1982	Hahnlein Racing	76	Olds		DAY; 32	TAL																							5th	945	
1982	Fortier Racing	40	Buick										FRS; 8	BFS; 17	MIL; 13	SND; 2													5th	945	
1983	Fortier Racing	40	Olds	DAY; 10		TAL; 6										POC; 15	TAL; 10												1st	3090	
1983	Fortier Racing	40	Pontiac		NSV; 14															MIL; 3									1st	3090	
1983	Fortier Racing	40	Buick				LPR; 1	LPR; 2	ISF; 7	**IRP**; 3	SSP; 1*	FRS; 2	BFS; 2	WIN; 6	LPR; 1			MCS; 5	FRS; 3		DSF; 6	ZAN; 4	SND; 2						1st	3090	
1984	Goudie Racing	83	Pontiac	DAY; 9	ATL; 5	TAL; 10	**CSP**; 2*	SMS; 8	FRS; 10	**MCS**; 1	LCS; 15	IRP; 7	TAL; 4	**FRS**; 2	ISF; 20	DSF; 16	TOL; 8	MGR; 9*											1st	2450	
1985	Goudie Racing	83	Pontiac	ATL; 28	DAY; 28	ATL; 27	TAL; 8	ATL; 16		IRP; 17	CSP; 6	FRS; 3	IRP; 20	OEF; 18	ISF; 33	DSF; 25	TOL; 2												10th	1790	
1985	Goudie Racing	83	Buick						SSP; 9																				10th	1790	
1986	Goudie Racing	83	Pontiac	ATL; 9	DAY; 25	ATL; 9	TAL; 7	SIR; 16	SSP; 23	FRS; 3	KIL; 12	CSP; 10	TAL; 20	BLN; 23	ISF; 8	DSF; 5	TOL; 4	MCS; 4	ATL; 8										2nd	2420	
1987	Goudie Racing	83	Chevy	DAY; 14	ATL; 23	TAL; 12	DEL; 12	ACS; 14		ROC; 6		FRS; 8	KIL; 19	TAL; 15		ISF; 6	INF; 22	DSF; 14	SLM; 7										5th	2870	
1987	Goudie Racing	83	Olds						TOL; 22																				5th	2870	
1987	Goudie Racing	83	Pontiac								POC; 5																		5th	2870	
1987	Goudie Racing	8	Chevy												FRS; 9					ATL; 30									5th	2870	
1988	D&D Racing	8	Chevy	DAY; 34	ATL; 26	TAL; 22	FRS; 3	PCS; 8	**ROC**; 9	POC; 10	WIN; 22	KIL; 7	ACS; 10	SLM; 6	POC; 13	TAL; 10	DEL; 3	FRS; 17	ISF; 10	DSF; 9	SLM; 24	ATL; 14							7th	3325	
1989	D&D Racing	8	Chevy	DAY; 31	ATL	KIL; 10	TAL	FRS; 4	POC; 11	KIL; 7	HAG; 2	POC; 23	TAL; 33	DEL; 5	FRS; 8	ISF; 9	TOL; 14	DSF; 4	SLM; 21	ATL; 14									8th	2680	
1990	D&D Racing	8	Chevy	DAY; 16	ATL; 25	KIL; 9	TAL; 25	FRS; 5	POC; 26	KIL; 13	TOL; 4	HAG; 5	POC; 14	TAL; 11	MCH; 32	ISF; 15	TOL; 6	DSF; 6	WIN; 12	DEL; 8	ATL; 22								5th	4055	
1991	D&D Racing	8	Chevy	DAY; 11	ATL; 13	KIL; 7	TAL; 13	TOL; 12	FRS; 23	POC; 12	MCH; 7	KIL; 3	FRS; 2	DEL; 11	POC; 8	TAL; 8	HPT; 12	MCH; 13	ISF; 15	TOL; 6	DSF; 8	TWS; 19	ATL; 5						4th	4695	
1992	D&D Racing	8	Chevy	DAY; 17	FIF; 19	TWS; 17	TAL; 28	TOL; 22	KIL; 9	POC; 24	MCH; 17	FRS; 17	KIL; 17	NSH; 24	DEL; 16	POC; 25	HPT; 11	FRS; 8	ISF; 9	TOL; 10	DSF; 8	TWS; 11	SLM; 20	ATL; 21					8th	4505	
1993	D&D Racing	8	Chevy	DAY; 24	FIF; 7	TWS; 41	TAL; 28	KIL; 25	CMS; 13	FRS	TOL; 13	POC; 36	MCH; 40	FRS; 15	POC	KIL; 15	ISF; 12	DSF; 13	TOL; 8	SLM; 13	WIN; 11	ATL; 36							11th	3365	
1994	D&D Racing	8	Chevy	DAY; 26	TAL	FIF	LVL	KIL	TOL	FRS	MCH	DMS	POC	POC	KIL	FRS	INF	I70	ISF	DSF		SLM; 19							NA	0	
1994	D&D Racing	7	Chevy																		TOL; 10								NA	0	
1994	Roulo Brothers Racing	39	Chevy																				WIN; 6	ATL					NA	0	
1996	Kim Kreider	1	Chevy	DAY	ATL	SLM	TAL	FIF	LVL	CLT	CLT	KIL	FRS	POC; 26	MCH; 23	FRS	TOL	POC	MCH; 24	INF	SBS	ISF	DSF	KIL	SLM	WIN	CLT	ATL	NA	0	

Sporting positions
Preceded by Marvin Smith	ARCA Series Champion; 1980	Succeeded by Larry Moyer
Preceded by Scott Stovall	ARCA Series Champion; 1983–1984	Succeeded by Lee Raymond
