= Ron Hornaday =

Ron Hornaday may refer to:

- Ron Hornaday Sr. (1931–2008), American racing driver and NASCAR Pacific Coast Series Champion
- Ron Hornaday Jr. (born 1958), American racing driver and NASCAR Truck Series Champion
- Ronnie Hornaday (born 1979), American racing driver
