= Bill Venturini =

American racing driver and team owner (born 1953)

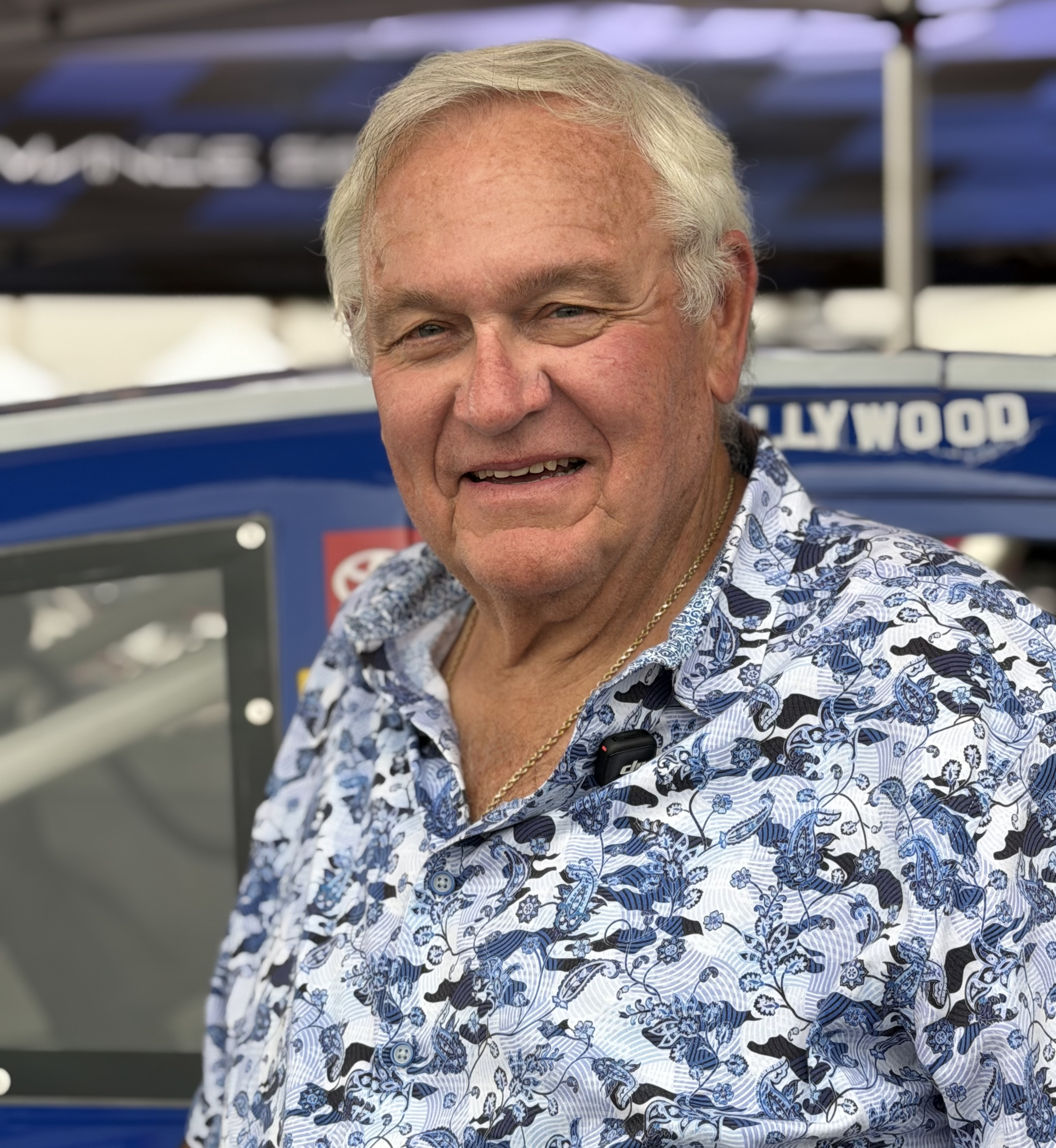
- Venturini in 2025
- Born: William Venturini; February 14, 1953 (age 73) Chicago, Illinois, U.S.
- Relatives: Tony Venturini (father); Billy Venturini (son); Wendy Venturini (daughter)

ARCA Bondo/Mar-Hyde Series career
- Debut season: 1982
- Starts: 188
- Wins: 12
- Poles: 12
- Best finish: 1st in 1987, 1991

Championship titles
- 1987, 1991: ARCA Bondo/Mar-Hyde Series

NASCAR Cup Series career
- 7 races run over 3 years
- Best finish: 45th (1990)
- First race: 1989 Miller High Life 400 (Michigan)
- Last race: 1991 Miller Genuine Draft 500 (Pocono)
Wins	Top tens	Poles
0	0	0

NASCAR O'Reilly Auto Parts Series career
- 4 races run over 4 years
- Best finish: 103rd (1985)
- First race: 1982 Goody's 300 (Daytona)
- Last race: 1985 Kroger 200 (IRP)
Wins	Top tens	Poles
0	0	0

NASCAR FedEx Freight Truck Series career
- 2 races run over 2 years
- Best finish: 78th (1995)
- First race: 1995 GM Goodwrench / Delco Battery 200 (Phoenix)
- Last race: 1996 Sears Auto Center 200 (Milwaukee)
Wins	Top tens	Poles
0	0	0
- Statistics up to date as of April 14, 2020.

William Venturini Sr (born February 14, 1953), nicknamed "Big Bill", is an American former professional stock car racing driver. He is the founder and co-owner of Venturini Motorsports, a team that competed in the ARCA Menards Series until 2025. As a driver, he primarily competed in the same series from 1982 through 1996. Venturini has won two ARCA championships, which came in 1987 and 1991.

== Career ==
=== Driving career ===
As a driver, "Big Bill" Venturini made his ARCA Series debut in 1982. In 1983, Venturini won his first ARCA race at Flat Rock Speedway and at the end of the season he became rookie of the year and finished runner-up to Bob Dotter. Venturini backed up this performance by finishing runner-up in 1984 and 1985. After finishing third in 1986 Venturini won his first ARCA championship in 1987. After finishing fourth in the 1988 season, Venturini scaled down and only ran a part-time schedule in 1989 and 1990. Venturini won his second ARCA championship in 1991 after a consistent season. He finished third in 1992 and sixth in his last full-time season in 1994. Venturini made his last ARCA Racing Series start at the season finale at Atlanta in 1996. During his ARCA Racing Series career Venturini set the all-time qualifying records at Daytona International Speedway and Talladega Superspeedway. Additionally, Venturini was the 1982 season champion of the International Racing Association.

Venturini competed in the first NASCAR race held outside North America, the 1988 Goodyear NASCAR 500 at the Calder Park Thunderdome in Australia, finishing 26th due to an accident 69 laps into the event. He made thirteen NASCAR starts across all three national series. Ventuni made his Winston Cup Series debut at Michigan International Speedway in 1989. In his seven Cup Series starts, his best finish was eighteenth at the 1990 Winston 500 at Talladega Superspeedway. Venturini attempted to qualify for the Daytona 500 in 1990 and 1991 but failed to qualify on both occasions.

=== Team owner career ===
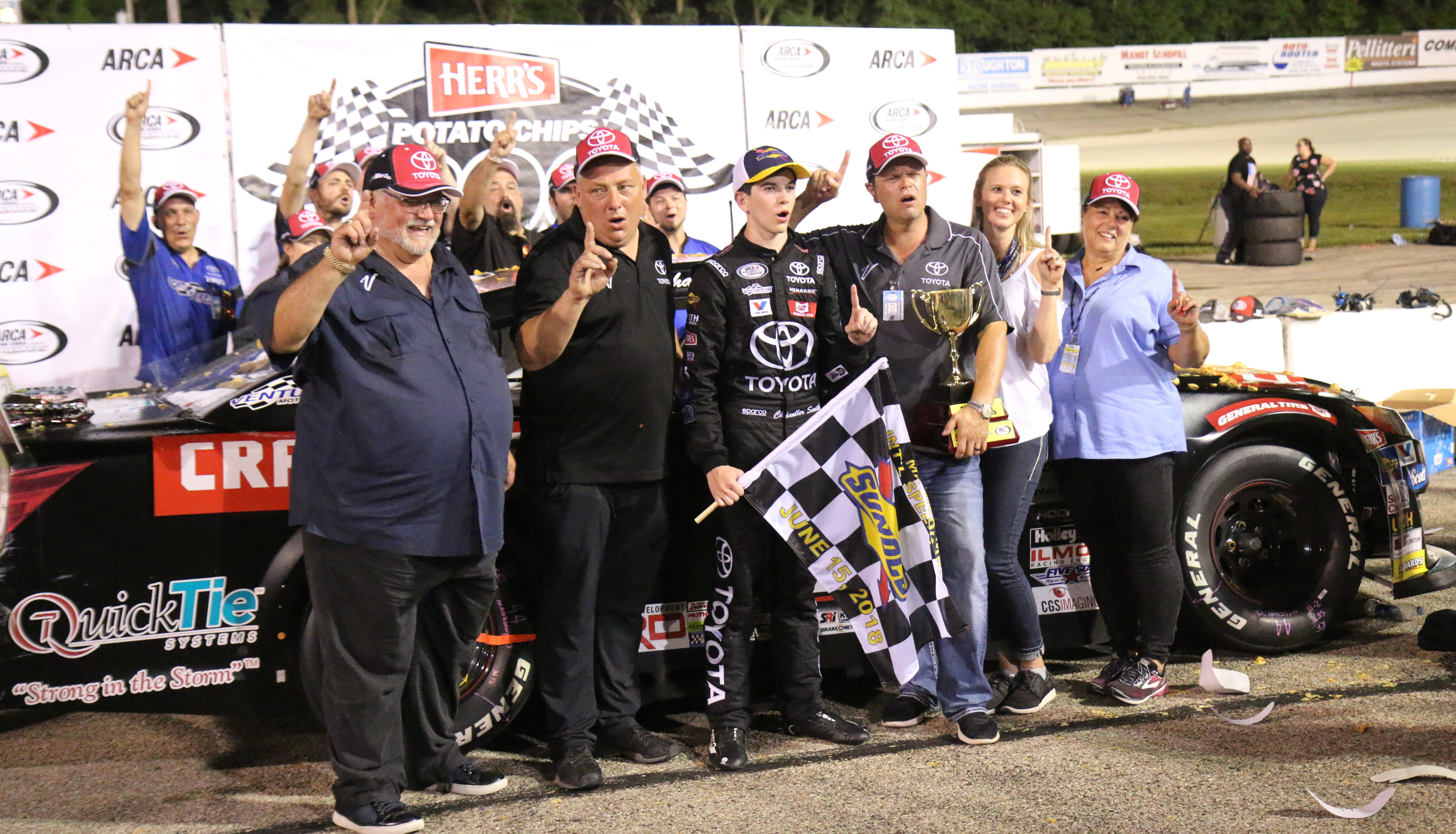
Venturini (on left in front of the car) celebrating a win by his driver Chandler Smith in 2018

Bill, his wife Cathy, and his son Billy, also a retired driver, are the co-owners of Venturini Motorsports, a team which competes full-time with three cars in the ARCA Menards Series (Nos. 15, 20, 25) as well as one part-time car (the No. 55). They have competed in that series for decades to much success. In 2020, they began fielding teams in the ARCA Menards Series East (the No. 20 part-time and the No. 25 full-time) and West (one car part-time).

It has been a tradition since 2006 for "Big Bill" to kiss one of his drivers in victory lane if they win a race. The first time he did it was when Billy was still competing in ARCA as a driver and won an ARCA race at Salem that year, and they continued it in 2007 when the Venturini's turned their team into a driver development team.

== Personal life ==
Venturini was born in Chicago, Illinois, as the son of Tony Venturini, an amateur racing driver who began his stock car racing career at the historic Soldier Field, also in Chicago. His father competed against NASCAR drivers such as Tom Pistone and Fred Lorenzen. Venturini's wife Cathy was part of his pit crew during his championship winning season in 1987. His son Billy also became a racing driver and competed in the ARCA Racing Series from 1994 through 2007. His daughter Wendy currently works in NASCAR as a radio reporter for the Performance Racing Network and formerly on TV for Speed and Fox as well.

== Motorsports career results ==
=== NASCAR ===
(key) (Bold – Pole position awarded by qualifying time. Italics – Pole position earned by points standings or practice time. * – Most laps led.)

==== Winston Cup Series ====
NASCAR Winston Cup Series results
Year	Team	No.	Make	1	2	3	4	5	6	7	8	9	10	11	12	13	14	15	16	17	18	19	20	21	22	23	24	25	26	27	28	29	30	31	NWCC	Pts	Ref
1989	Venturini Motorsports	35	Chevy	DAY	CAR	ATL	RCH	DAR	BRI	NWS	MAR	TAL	CLT	DOV	SON	POC	MCH; 37	DAY	POC	TAL	GLN	MCH	BRI	DAR	RCH	DOV	MAR	CLT	NWS	CAR	PHO	ATL			100th	52	
1990	Venturini Motorsports	35	Chevy	DAY; DNQ	RCH	CAR	ATL	DAR	BRI	NWS	MAR	TAL; 18	CLT; DNQ	DOV	SON	POC	MCH; 30	DAY	POC	TAL; 25	GLN	MCH; 28	BRI	DAR	RCH	DOV	MAR	NWS	CLT; DNQ	CAR	PHO	ATL			45th	349	
1991	Venturini Motorsports	35	Chevy	DAY; DNQ	RCH	CAR	ATL	DAR	BRI	NWS	MAR	TAL	CLT	DOV	SON	POC	MCH; 40	DAY	POC; 39	TAL	GLN	MCH	BRI	DAR	RCH	DOV	MAR	NWS	CLT	CAR	PHO	ATL; DNQ			74th	89	
1992	Venturini Motorsports	35	Chevy	DAY	CAR	RCH	ATL	DAR	BRI	NWS	MAR	TAL	CLT	DOV	SON	POC	MCH; DNQ	DAY	POC	TAL	GLN	MCH; DNQ	BRI	DAR	RCH	DOV	MAR	NWS	CLT	CAR	PHO	ATL			NA	-	
1993	Venturini Motorsports	35	Chevy	DAY	CAR	RCH	ATL	DAR	BRI	NWS	MAR	TAL	SON	CLT	DOV	POC	MCH	DAY; DNQ	NHA	POC	TAL	GLN	MCH	BRI	DAR	RCH	DOV	MAR	NWS	CLT; DNQ	CAR	PHO	ATL		NA	-	
1994	Venturini Motorsports	35	Chevy	DAY	CAR	RCH	ATL	DAR	BRI	NWS	MAR	TAL	SON	CLT	DOV	POC	MCH	DAY	NHA	POC	TAL	IND	GLN	MCH	BRI	DAR	RCH	DOV	MAR	NWS	CLT	CAR	PHO	ATL; DNQ	NA	-	

===== Daytona 500 =====
Year	Team	Manufacturer	Start	Finish
1990	Venturini Motorsports	Chevrolet	DNQ	
1991	Venturini Motorsports	Chevrolet	DNQ	

==== Busch Series ====
NASCAR Busch Series results
Year	Team	No.	Make	1	2	3	4	5	6	7	8	9	10	11	12	13	14	15	16	17	18	19	20	21	22	23	24	25	26	27	28	29	30	31	32	33	34	35	NBSC	Pts	Ref
1982	Venturini Motorsports	35	Buick	DAY; 13	RCH	BRI	MAR	DAR	HCY	SBO	CRW	RCH	LGY	DOV	HCY	CLT	ASH	HCY	SBO	CAR	CRW	SBO	HCY	LGY	IRP	BRI	HCY	RCH	MAR	CLT	HCY	MAR							126th	124	
1983	Venturini Motorsports	65	Pontiac	DAY; 24	RCH	CAR	HCY	MAR	NWS	SBO	GPS	LGY	DOV	BRI	CLT	SBO	HCY	ROU	SBO	ROU	CRW	ROU	SBO	HCY	LGY	IRP	GPS	BRI	HCY	DAR	RCH	NWS	SBO	MAR	ROU	CLT	HCY	MAR	130th	91	
1984	Venturini Motorsports	35	Pontiac	DAY	RCH	CAR	HCY	MAR	DAR	ROU	NSV	LGY	MLW; 11	DOV	CLT	SBO	HCY	ROU	SBO	ROU	HCY	IRP	LGY	SBO	BRI	DAR	RCH	NWS	CLT	HCY	CAR	MAR							113th	-	
1985	Venturini Motorsports	35	Pontiac	DAY	CAR	HCY	BRI	MAR	DAR	SBO	LGY	DOV	CLT	SBO	HCY	ROU	IRP; 21	SBO	LGY	HCY	MLW	BRI	DAR	RCH	NWS	ROU	CLT	HCY	CAR	MAR									103rd	-	
1995	Colburn Racing	36	Ford	DAY	CAR	RCH	ATL	NSV	DAR	BRI	HCY; DNQ	NHA; DNQ	NZH	CLT; DNQ	DOV	MYB	GLN	MLW	TAL	SBO	IRP	MCH	BRI	DAR	RCH	DOV	CLT	CAR	HOM										NA	-	

==== Craftsman Truck Series ====
NASCAR Craftsman Truck Series results
Year	Team	No.	Make	1	2	3	4	5	6	7	8	9	10	11	12	13	14	15	16	17	18	19	20	21	22	23	24	NCTC	Pts	Ref
1995	Venturini Motorsports	35	Chevy	PHO	TUS	SGS	MMR	POR	EVG	I70	LVL	BRI	MLW	CNS	HPT	IRP	FLM	RCH	MAR	NWS; DNQ	SON	MMR	PHO; 34					78th	116	
1996	Venturini Motorsports	35	Chevy	HOM	PHO	POR	EVG	TUS	CNS	HPT	BRI	NZH	MLW; 31	LVL	I70	IRP	FLM	GLN	NSV	RCH	NHA	MAR	NWS	SON	MMR	PHO	LVS	119th	70	

=== ARCA Bondo/Mar-Hyde Series ===
(key) (Bold – Pole position awarded by qualifying time. Italics – Pole position earned by points standings or practice time. * – Most laps led.)

ARCA Bondo/Mar-Hyde Series results
Year	Team	No.	Make	1	2	3	4	5	6	7	8	9	10	11	12	13	14	15	16	17	18	19	20	21	22	23	24	25	ABSC	Pts	Ref
1982		35	Buick	NSV	DAY; 22	TAL	FRS	CMS	WIN	NSV	TAT	TAL	FRS	BFS															NA	0	
1982	Venturini Motorsports	25	Buick												MIL; 3	SND													NA	0	
1983	Venturini Motorsports	35	Pontiac	DAY; 7	NSV; 2	TAL; 8	LPR; 3*	LPR; 6	ISF; 13	IRP; 5	SSP; 2	FRS; 1*	BFS; 6	WIN; 13	LPR; 4	**POC**; 14	TAL; 9	MCS; 1	FRS; 2	MIL; 2	DSF; 8	ZAN; 6	SND; 3						2nd	3075	
1984	Venturini Motorsports	35	Pontiac	DAY; 20	ATL; 6	TAL; 4							TAL; 27																2nd	2425	
1984	Venturini Motorsports	35	Chevy				CSP; 17	SMS; 4	**FRS**; 1*	MCS; 11	LCS; 3	IRP; 20		FRS; 1*	ISF; 6	DSF; 14	**TOL**; 3	MGR; 2											2nd	2425	
1985	Venturini Motorsports	35	Chevy	ATL; 10	DAY; 38	ATL; 6	**TAL**; 4	ATL; 25	SSP; 1*		CSP; 5	FRS; 4	IRP; 6	**OEF**; 4	ISF; 4	DSF; 7	TOL; 12												2nd	2585	
1985	Venturini Motorsports	35	Pontiac							IRP; 21																			2nd	2585	
1986	Venturini Motorsports	25	Chevy	ATL; 15	DAY; 19	ATL; 1	TAL; 9	SIR; 18	SSP; 20	FRS; 12	KIL; 4	CSP; 4	TAL; 4*	BLN; 2	ISF; 22	DSF; 18	TOL; 19	MCS; 10	**ATL**; 2										3rd	2385	
1987	Venturini Motorsports	25	Chevy	**DAY**; 2	**ATL**; 5	**TAL**; 33	DEL; 1*	ACS; 22	TOL; 1	**ROC**; 1	POC; 6	FRS; 14	KIL; 7*	TAL; 3	FRS; 3	ISF; 14	INF; 5	DSF; 10	SLM; 2	ATL; 1									1st	4245	
1988	Venturini Motorsports	25	Chevy	DAY; 5	ATL; 3	TAL; 39	FRS; 8	PCS; 10	ROC; 5	POC; 3	WIN; 12	KIL; 6	ACS; 14	SLM; 7	POC; 5	TAL; 2	DEL; 6	FRS; 3	ISF; 30	DSF; 37	SLM; 17	ATL; 23							4th	3740	
1989	Venturini Motorsports	25	Chevy	DAY; 39	ATL; 19	KIL	TAL; 4	FRS; 25	POC	KIL	HAG	POC	TAL	DEL	FRS	ISF	TOL	DSF	SLM	ATL									NA	0	
1990	Venturini Motorsports	25	Chevy	DAY	ATL	KIL; 2	TAL	FRS; 17	POC	KIL; 8	TOL; 18	HAG	POC	TAL			TOL; 4	DSF	WIN	DEL; 4									16th	1605	
1990	Venturini Motorsports	35	Chevy												MCH; 5	ISF					ATL; 3								16th	1605	
1991	Venturini Motorsports	35	Chevy	DAY; 16																									1st	5085	
1991	Venturini Motorsports	25	Chevy		ATL; 29	KIL; 19	**TAL**; 2	TOL; 6	FRS; 12	POC; 7	MCH; 12	KIL; 7	FRS; 7	**DEL**; 3	POC; 5	TAL; 3	HPT; 16	MCH; 6	ISF; 9	TOL; 11	DSF; 4	TWS; 1	ATL; 3						1st	5085	
1992	Venturini Motorsports	25	Chevy	DAY; 3	FIF; 6	TWS; 28	TAL; 4	TOL; 15	KIL; 1	POC; 6	MCH; 5	FRS; 8	KIL; 6	NSH; 25	DEL; 5	POC; 6	HPT; 20	FRS; 3	ISF; 22	TOL; 6	DSF; 15	TWS; 29	SLM; 18	ATL; 18					3rd	5265	
1993	Venturini Motorsports	25	Chevy	DAY; 30	FIF	TWS; 30	TAL; 12	KIL	CMS	FRS	TOL	POC; 14	MCH; 4	FRS	POC; 5	KIL	ISF	DSF	TOL	SLM	WIN								NA	0	
1993	Bill Egbert	25	Chevy																			ATL; 35							NA	0	
1994	Bill Egbert	25	Chevy	DAY; 20	TAL; 5	FIF; 8	LVL; 10	KIL; 7	TOL; 20	FRS; 14	MCH; 26	DMS; 35	POC; 6	POC; 29	KIL; 15	FRS; 5	INF; 27	I70; 21	ISF; 9	DSF; 16	TOL; 13	SLM; 12	WIN; 11	ATL; 26					6th	4515	
1995	Venturini Motorsports	25	Chevy	DAY; 41	ATL	TAL	FIF	KIL	FRS	MCH; 15	I80	MCS	FRS	POC	POC; 28	KIL	FRS	SBS	LVL	ISF	DSF	SLM	WIN	ATL					NA	0	
1996	Venturini Motorsports	25	Chevy	DAY	ATL	SLM	TAL	FIF	LVL	CLT	CLT	KIL	FRS	POC	MCH	FRS	TOL	POC	MCH	INF	SBS	ISF	DSF	KIL	SLM	WIN	CLT	ATL; 17	NA	0	
