= Dawson Sutton =

American racing driver (born 2006)

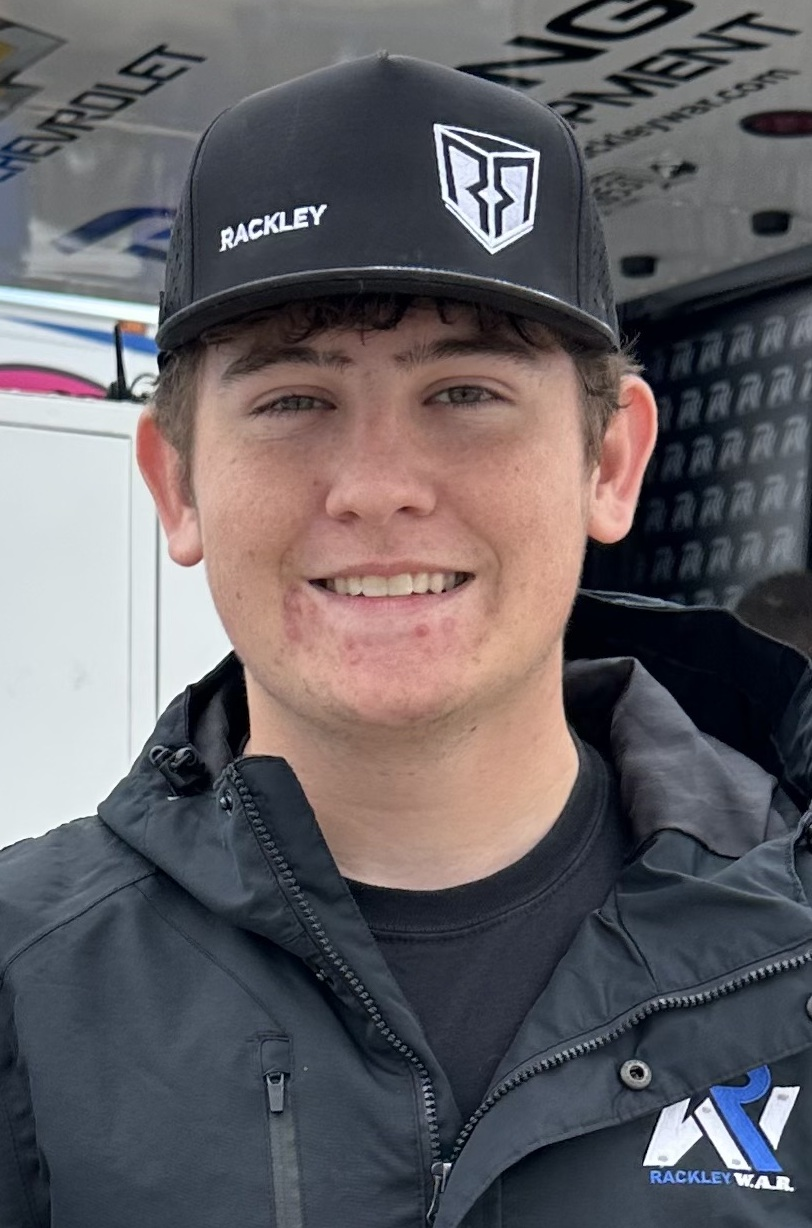
- Sutton at Las Vegas Motor Speedway in 2024
- Born: January 28, 2006 (age 20); Lebanon, Tennessee, U.S.
- Achievements: 2025 All American 400 Winner; 2025 Glass City 200 Winner

NASCAR FedEx Freight Truck Series career
- 54 races run over 3 years
- Truck no., team: No. 5 (Tricon Garage)
- 2026 position: 20th
- Best finish: 18th (2025)
- First race: 2024 Wright Brand 250 (North Wilkesboro)
- Last race: 2026 Love's RV Stop 225 (Talladega)
Wins	Top tens	Poles
0	4	0

ARCA Menards Series career
- 2 races run over 2 years
- Best finish: 89th (2026)
- First race: 2024 Bush's Beans 200 (Bristol)
- Last race: 2026 Lime Rock Park ARCA 100 (Lime Rock)
Wins	Top tens	Poles
0	1	0

ARCA Menards Series East career
- 1 race run over 1 year
- Best finish: 61st (2024)
- First race: 2024 Bush's Beans 200 (Bristol)
Wins	Top tens	Poles
0	0	0
- Statistics up to date as of November 6, 2026.

Dawson Sutton (born January 28, 2006) is an American professional stock car racing driver. He competes full-time in the NASCAR Truck Series, driving the No. 5 Toyota Tundra TRD Pro for Tricon Garage.

== Racing career ==
Sutton first began his racing career in 2022, where he competed in the Southeast Legends Tour, the INEX Nashville Spring Series, the Thursday Thunder Legends Racing Series and Atlanta Motor Speedway, and the INEX Summer Shootout Series at Charlotte Motor Speedway. He then ran his first full-time season in late models in 2023, where he competed in over thirty events at Nashville Fairgrounds Speedway, achieving four poles, two wins, and sixteen top-five finishes, and finished seventh in the World Series of Asphalt Stock Car Racing standings.

On January 21, 2024, Sutton announced that he would run the full schedule in the ASA STARS Super Late Model Series.

=== NASCAR Craftsman Truck Series ===
In 2024, it was announced that he would make his debut in the NASCAR Craftsman Truck Series at North Wilkesboro Speedway, driving the No. 26 Chevrolet for Rackley W.A.R. After starting 36th and last due to qualifying being rained out, Sutton finished two laps down in 28th place. On September 23, 2024, it was announced that Sutton would compete at the remaining five races of season, driving the No. 25 Silverado for Rackley W.A.R.

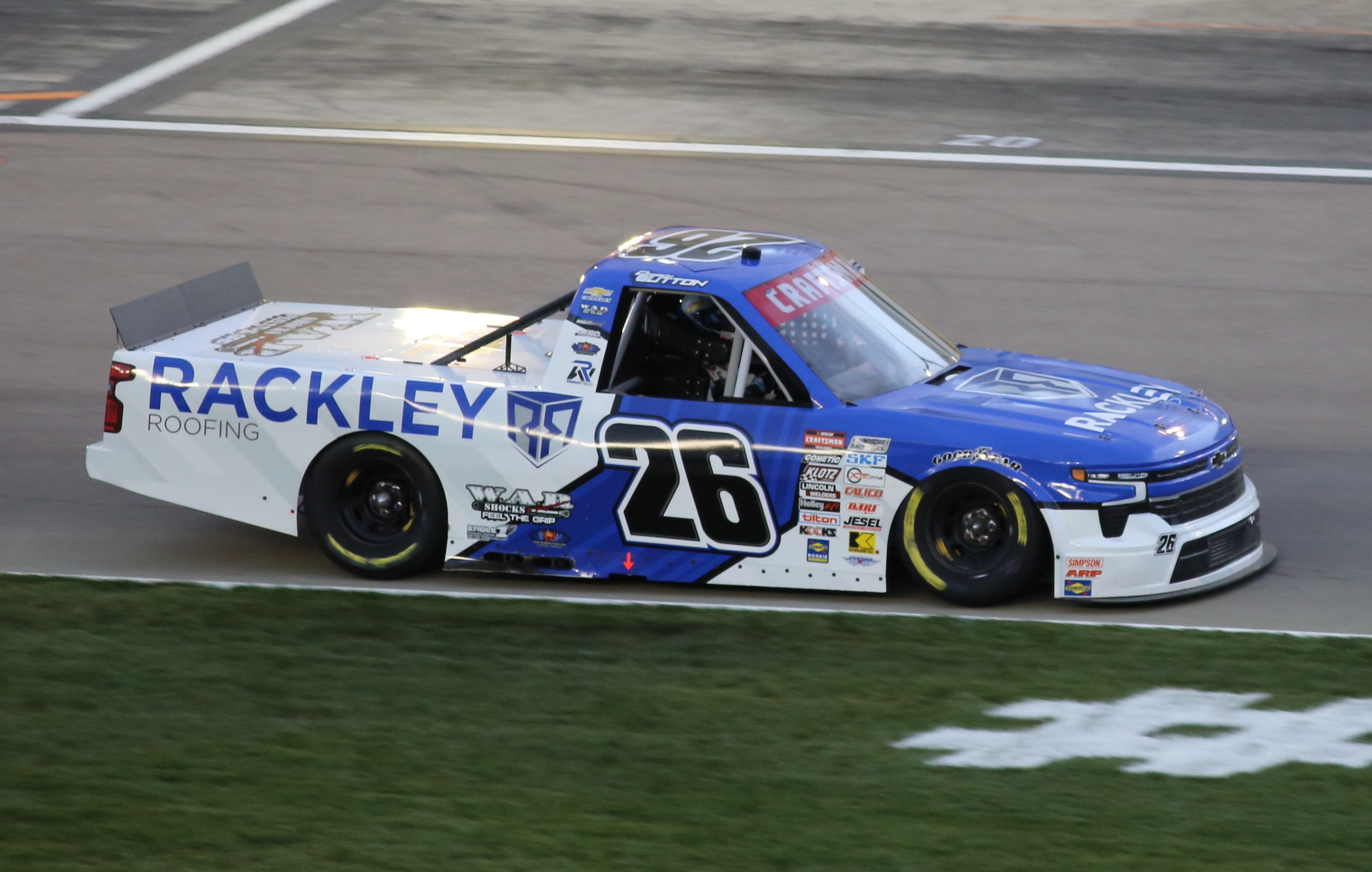
Sutton's No. 26 truck at Las Vegas Motor Speedway in 2025

On October 17, 2024, it was announced that Sutton would run full-time in the Truck Series in 2025 season, driving the No. 26 Chevrolet for Rackley W.A.R.. Sutton started the 2025 season with an 25th-finish at Daytona. He had two top-ten finishes with a best result of fourth at Talladega, and finished 18th in the final points standings.

In October 2025, it was revealed that Sutton would remain full-time in the Truck Series with Rackley W.A.R. for the 2026 season. He started the 2026 season with a 27th-place finish at Daytona. For New Hampshire, Sutton attempted to qualify in Rackley's No. 27, allowing Toni Breidinger to make the race in his No. 26. Sutton failed to qualify but Breidinger withdrew, allowing Sutton to drive the No. 26 for the race. On September 21, it was announced that Sutton would miss the race at Kansas to race a Super Late Model in Pensacola in preparation for the Snowball Derby. Breidinger would drive the No. 26. He would miss the final two races of the season following the closing Rackley W.A.R.'s Truck Series program after Talladega.

On October 23, 2026, it was announced that Sutton will move to Tricon Garage, driving the No, 5 Toyota full-time for the 2027 season.

== Personal life ==
Sutton is the son of Curtis Sutton, who is the co-owner of Rackley W.A.R.

== Motorsports career results ==
=== Racing career summary ===
Season	Series	Team	Races	Wins	Top 5	Top 10	Points	Position
2023	CARS Pro Late Model Tour	Rackley W.A.R.	7	0	2	5	154	14th
2024	ASA STARS National Tour	Rackley W.A.R.	10	1	4	4	551	4th
2024	ARCA Menards Series East	Hettinger Racing	1	0	0	0	11	61st
2024	ARCA Menards Series	Hettinger Racing	1	0	0	0	11	116th
2024	NASCAR Craftsman Truck Series	Rackley W.A.R.	7	0	1	1	130	33rd
2025	ASA STARS National Tour	Rackley W.A.R.	12	2	7	8	767	**3rd**
2025	CARS Pro Late Model Tour	Rackley W.A.R.	2	0	1	2	74	26th
2025	NASCAR Craftsman Truck Series	Rackley W.A.R.	25	0	1	2	447	18th
2026	ASA STARS National Tour	Rackley W.A.R.	3	0	1	2	207*	16th*
2026	CARS Pro Late Model Tour	Rackley W.A.R.	1	1	1	1	47	34th
2026	ARCA Menards Series	Cook Racing Technologies	1	0	0	1	35	89th
2026	NASCAR Craftsman Truck Series	Rackley W.A.R.	22	0	0	1	366	20th

=== NASCAR ===
(key) (Bold – Pole position awarded by qualifying time. Italics – Pole position earned by points standings or practice time. * – Most laps led.)

=== Truck Series ===
NASCAR Truck Series results
Year	Team	No.	Make	1	2	3	4	5	6	7	8	9	10	11	12	13	14	15	16	17	18	19	20	21	22	23	24	25	NTSC	Pts	Ref
2024	Rackley W.A.R.	26	Chevy	DAY	ATL	LVS	BRI	COA	MAR	TEX	KAN	DAR	NWS; 28	CLT	GTW	NSH; 18	POC	IRP	RCH	MLW	BRI								33rd	130	
2024	Rackley W.A.R.	25	Chevy																			KAN; 5	TAL; 24	HOM; 19	MAR; 15	PHO; 20			33rd	130	
2025	Rackley W.A.R.	26	Chevy	DAY; 25	ATL; 17	LVS; 19	HOM; 23	MAR; 16	BRI; 17	CAR; 19	TEX; 9	KAN; 15	NWS; 26	CLT; 31	NSH; 11	MCH; 13	POC; 29	LRP; 30	IRP; 19	GLN; 14	RCH; 31	DAR; 19	BRI; 17	NHA; 14	ROV; 13	TAL; 4	MAR; 19	PHO; 34	18th	447	
2026	Rackley W.A.R.	26	Chevy	DAY; 27	ATL; 32	STP; 33	DAR; 19	CAR; 15	BRI; 7	TEX; 16	GLN; 19	DOV; 23	CLT; 21	NSH; 17	MCH; 36	COR; 26	LRP; 15	NWS; 16	IRP; 17	RCH; 26	NHA; 25	BRI; 15	KAN	CLT; 14	PHO; 22	TAL; 19	MAR	HOM	20th	366	
2026	Rackley W.A.R.	27	Chevy																		NHA; DNQ								20th	366	
2027	Tricon Garage	5	Toyota	DAY	ATL	STP	DAR	BRI	TEX	KAN	NWS	CLT	NSH	POC	MCH	LRP	ATL	IRP	BRI	BGS	MSP	NHA	KAN	CLT	PHO	TAL	MAR	HOM			

^{*} Season still in progress
^{1} Ineligible for series points

=== ARCA Menards Series ===
(key) (Bold – Pole position awarded by qualifying time. Italics – Pole position earned by points standings or practice time. * – Most laps led.)

ARCA Menards Series results
Year	Team	No.	Make	1	2	3	4	5	6	7	8	9	10	11	12	13	14	15	16	17	18	19	20	AMSC	Pts	Ref
2024	Hettinger Racing	71	Chevy	DAY	PHO	TAL	DOV	KAN	CLT	IOW	MOH	BLN	IRP	SLM	ELK	MCH	ISF	MLW	DSF	GLN	BRI; 33	KAN	TOL	116th	11	
2026	Cook Racing Technologies	42	Chevy	DAY	PHO	KAN	TAL	GLN	TOL	MCH	POC	BER	ELK	CHI	LRP; 9	IRP	IOW	ISF	MAD	DSF	SLM	BRI	KAN	89th	35	

==== ARCA Menards Series East ====
ARCA Menards Series East results
Year	Team	No.	Make	1	2	3	4	5	6	7	8	AMSEC	Pts	Ref
2024	Hettinger Racing	71	Chevy	FIF	DOV	NSV	FRS	IOW	IRP	MLW	BRI; 33	61st	11	

=== CARS Pro Late Model Tour ===
(key)

CARS Pro Late Model Tour results
Year	Team	No.	Make	1	2	3	4	5	6	7	8	9	10	11	12	13	CPLMTC	Pts	Ref
2023	Rackley W.A.R.	26	Chevy	SNM	HCY; 5	ACE; 8	NWS; 39	TCM; 8	DIL	CRW; 7	WKS	HCY	TCM; 2	SBO	TCM; 16	CRW	14th	154	
2025	Rackley W.A.R.	26	Chevy	AAS	CDL	OCS	ACE	NWS; 2	CRW	HCY							26th	74	
2025	Rackley W.A.R.	17	Chevy								HCY; 9	AND	FLC	SBO	TCM	NWS	26th	74	
2026	Rackley W.A.R.	62	Chevy	SNM	NSV; 1*	CRW	ACE	NWS	HCY	AND	FLC	TCM	NPS	SBO			35th	47	

=== ASA STARS National Tour ===
(key) (Bold – Pole position awarded by qualifying time. Italics – Pole position earned by points standings or practice time. * – Most laps led. ** – All laps led.)

ASA STARS National Tour results
Year	Team	No.	Make	1	2	3	4	5	6	7	8	9	10	11	12	ASNTC	Pts	Ref
2024	Rackley W.A.R.	26S	Chevy	NSM; 24	FIF; 23	HCY; 3	MAD; 13		AND; 16				NSV; 3*			4th	551	
2024	Rackley W.A.R.	26	Chevy					MLW; 1		OWO; 4	TOL; 18	WIN; 17				4th	551	
2025	Rackley W.A.R.	26S	Chevy	NSM; 22	FIF; 11	DOM; 5	HCY; 9	NPS; 3	MAD; 14	SLG; 7	AND; 13	OWO; 2	**TOL**; 1*			3rd	767	
2025	Rackley W.A.R.	26	Chevy											WIN; 2	**NSV**; 1*	3rd	767	
2026	Rackley W.A.R.	26	Chevy	NSM; 2	FIF	HCY	SLG	MAD	NPS	OWO	TRI	**WIN**; 15	**NSV**; 10	NSM		-*	-*	
