= List of NASCAR tracks =

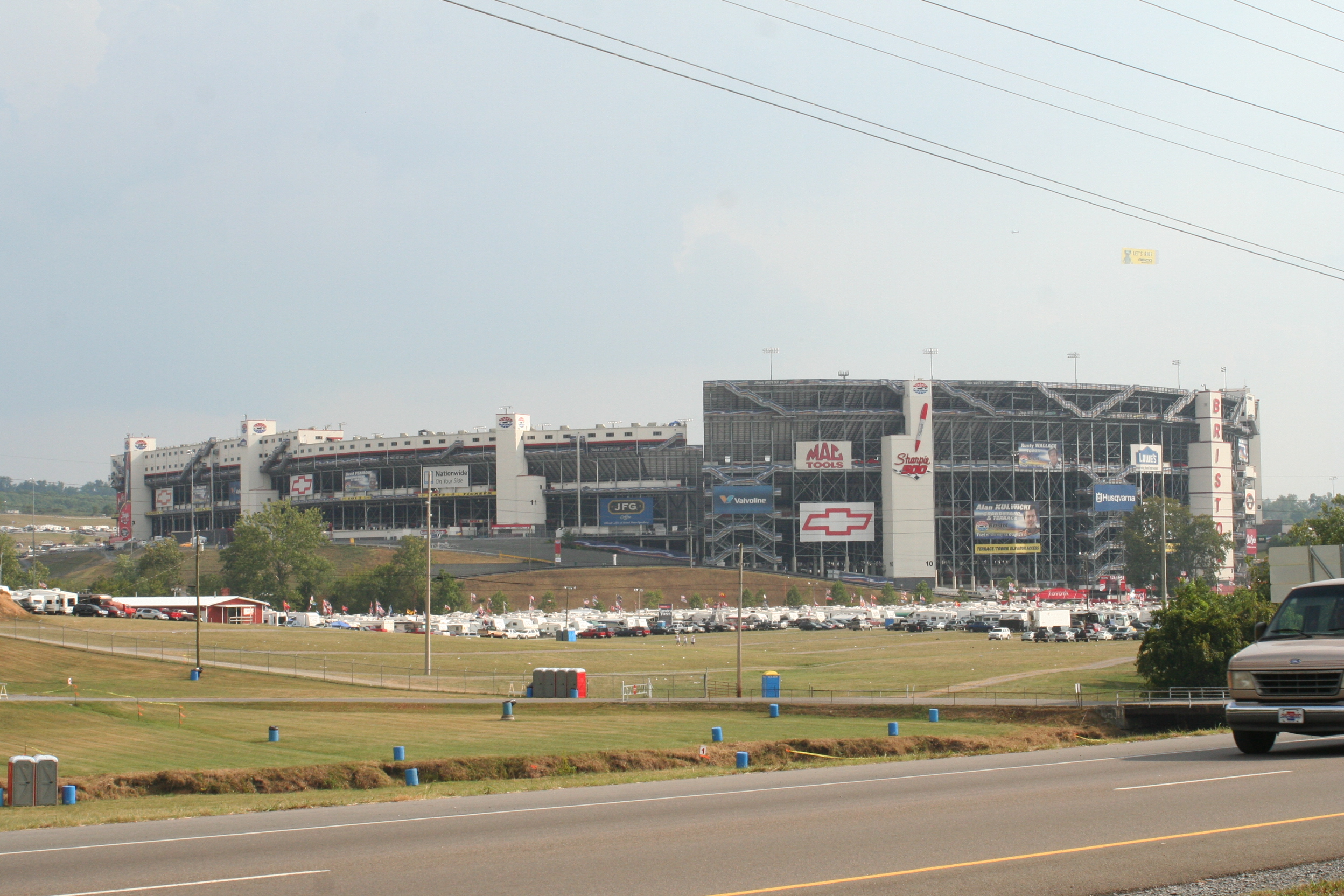
Bristol Motor Speedway

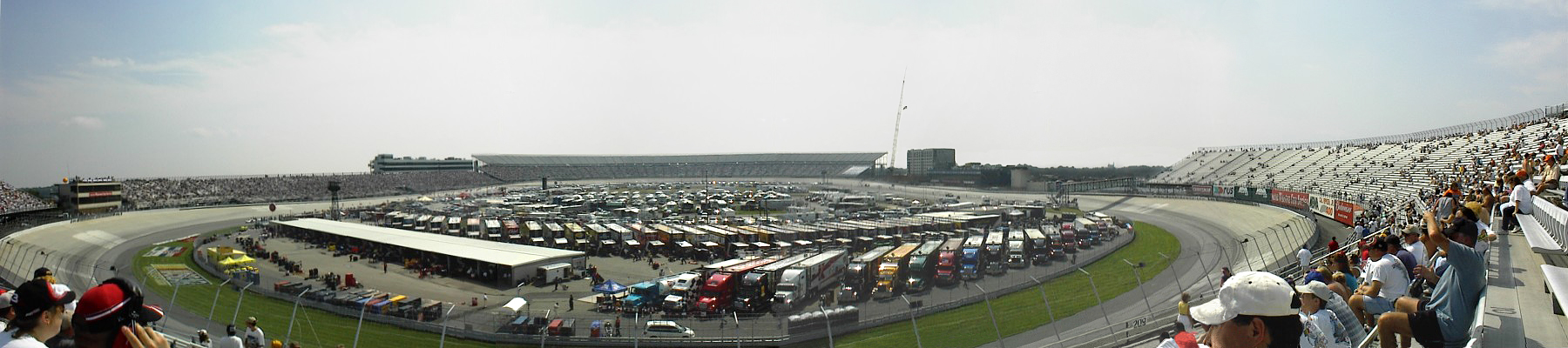
Dover Motor Speedway

This is a list of tracks which have hosted a NASCAR race from 1948 to present. Various forms of race track have been used throughout the history of NASCAR, including purpose-built race tracks such as Daytona International Speedway and temporary tracks such as the Los Angeles Memorial Coliseum.

== NASCAR national series race tracks ==
The following is a list of race tracks currently used by NASCAR as part of its NASCAR Cup Series, NASCAR O'Reilly Auto Parts Series, or NASCAR Truck Series for the 2027 racing season or after.

- **Bold** – Indicates crown jewel race.
- Italic – Indicates exhibition race.

=== Track table ===
Track	Type and Length	Banking (oval) Direction (non-oval)	Location	Map	Owner	Seating	Cup Races	O'Reilly Races	Truck Races
Bowman Gray Stadium	0.250-mile (0.402 km) paved oval	No banking	Winston-Salem, North Carolina	Track map of Bowman Gray Stadium.	City of Winston-Salem	17,000	None	None	TBA
Bristol Motor Speedway	0.533-mile (0.858 km) concrete oval	Turns: 26°–30° Straights: 6°–10°	Bristol, Tennessee	Track map of Bristol Motor Speedway.	Speedway Motorsports	146,000	Food City 500; Bass Pro Shops Night Race	Suburban Propane 300; Food City 300	Tennessee Army National Guard 250; UNOH 250
Canadian Tire Motorsport Park	2.459-mile (3.957 km) paved road course	Clockwise	Bowmanville, Ontario		Peter Thomson	Standing room around track	None	None	TBA
Charlotte Motor Speedway	1.500-mile (2.414 km) paved quad-oval	Turns: 24° Straights: 5°	Concord, North Carolina	Track map of Charlotte Motor Speedway.	Speedway Motorsports	95,000	**Coca-Cola 600**; Bank of America 400	Charbroil 300; Blue Cross NC 250	North Carolina Education Lottery 200; Ecosave 200
Chicagoland Speedway	1.500-mile (2.414 km) paved tri-oval	Turns: 18° Frontstretch: 11° Backstretch: 5°	Joliet, Illinois	Chicagoland Speedway oval	NASCAR	47,000	eero 400	Cuervo 300	None
Circuit of the Americas	2.326-mile (3.743 km) paved road course	Counter-clockwise	Austin, Texas	Track map of Circuit of the Americas	Circuit of the Americas, LLC	56,000 (seating capacity, overall capacity over 120,000)	DuraMAX Texas Grand Prix	Focused Health 250	None
Coronado Street Course	3.40-mile (5.47 km) paved airfield circuit	Clockwise	San Diego, California	Track map of Coronado Street Course	City of San Diego	Temporary grandstands around track	Anduril 250	United Rentals Driven to Serve 250	None
Darlington Raceway	1.366-mile (2.198 km) paved egg-shaped oval	Turns 1/2: 25° Turns 3/4: 23° Frontstretch: 3° Backstretch: 2°	Darlington, South Carolina	Track map of Darlington Raceway.	NASCAR	47,000	Goodyear 400; **Cook Out Southern 500**	Sport Clips Haircuts VFW 200; TBA	Buckle Up South Carolina 200
Daytona International Speedway	2.500-mile (4.023 km) paved tri-oval	Turns: 31° Tri-Oval: 18° Backstretch: 2°	Daytona Beach, Florida	Track map of Daytona International Speedway.	NASCAR	101,500 (expandable to 123,500)	Wheatley Vodka Clash; The Duel at Daytona; **Daytona 500**; Coke Zero Sugar 400	United Rentals 300; Winn-Dixie 250	Fresh From Florida 250
Dover Motor Speedway	1.000-mile (1.609 km) concrete oval	Turns: 24° Straights: 9°	Dover, Delaware	Track map of Dover Motor Speedway.	Speedway Motorsports	54,000	Ecosave 400	BetRivers 200	None
EchoPark Speedway	1.540-mile (2.478 km) paved quad-oval	Turns: 28° Straights: 5°	Hampton, Georgia	Track map of Atlanta Motor Speedway.	Speedway Motorsports	71,000	Autotrader 400; Quaker State 400	Bennett Transportation & Logistics 250	Fr8 208; TBA
Homestead–Miami Speedway	1.500-mile (2.414 km) paved oval	Turns: 18°–20° (Progressive); Straights: 3°	Homestead, Florida	Track map of Homestead-Miami Speedway.	NASCAR	43,000	Season Finale 400	O'Reilly Auto Parts 300	Craftsman 200
Indianapolis Motor Speedway	2.500-mile (4.023 km) paved rectangular oval	Turns: 9° Straights: 0°	Speedway, Indiana	Track map of Indianapolis Motor Speedway.	Penske Entertainment Corp.	257,327 (permanent seats)	**Brickyard 400**	Pennzoil 250	None
Iowa Speedway	0.875-mile (1.408 km) paved D-shaped oval	Turns: 12–14° (Progressive); Frontstretch: 10° Backstretch:4°	Newton, Iowa	Track map of Iowa Speedway.	NASCAR	30,000	Iowa Corn 350	Hy-Vee PERKS 250	None
Kansas Speedway	1.500-mile (2.414 km) paved tri-oval	Turns: 17°–20° (Progressive); Tri-Oval: 9°–11° (progressive); Backstretch: 5°	Kansas City, Kansas	Track map of Kansas Speedway.	NASCAR	48,000	AdventHealth 400; Hollywood Casino 400	Kansas Lottery 300	RaceToStopSuicide.com 200; TBA
Las Vegas Motor Speedway	1.500-mile (2.414 km) paved tri-oval	Turns: 20° Tri-Oval: 12° Backstretch: 9°	Las Vegas, Nevada	Track map of Las Vegas Motor Speedway.	Speedway Motorsports	80,000	Pennzoil 400; South Point 400	The LiUNA! Focused Health 302	None
Lime Rock Park	1.530-mile (2.462 km) paved road course	Clockwise	Lakeville, Connecticut	Track map of Lime Rock Park racing circuit	Lime Rock Group, LLC	N/A	None	None	LiUNA! 150
Lucas Oil Indianapolis Raceway Park	0.686-mile (1.104 km) paved oval	Turns: 12° Straights: 0°	Brownsburg, Indiana	Track map of Indianapolis Raceway Park	NHRA	30,000	None	None	TSport 200
Martinsville Speedway	0.526-mile (0.847 km) paved/concrete paperclip-shaped oval	Turns: 12° Straights: 0°	Ridgeway, Virginia	Track map of Martinsville Speedway.	NASCAR	44,000 (less than, estimate)	Cook Out 400; Xfinity 500	NFPA 250; National Debt Relief 250	Black's Tire 200
Michigan International Speedway	2.000-mile (3.219 km) paved D-shaped oval	Turns: 18° Frontstretch: 12° Backstretch: 5°	Brooklyn, Michigan	Track map of Michigan International Speedway.	NASCAR	56,000	FireKeepers Casino 400	None	DQS Solutions & Staffing 200
Nashville Superspeedway	1.333-mile (2.145 km) concrete tri-oval	Turns: 14° Tri-Oval: 8° Straights: 5°	Lebanon, Tennessee	Track map of Nashville Superspeedway.	Speedway Motorsports	25,000	Cracker Barrel 400	Sports Illustrated Resorts 250	Allegiance 200
New Hampshire Motor Speedway	1.058-mile (1.703 km) paved paperclip-shaped oval	Turns: 2°–7° Straights: 1°	Loudon, New Hampshire	Track map of New Hampshire Motor Speedway.	Speedway Motorsports	44,000	Dollar Tree 301	None	Team EJP 175
North Wilkesboro Speedway	0.625-mile (1.006 km) paved oval	Turns: 14° Straights: 3°	North Wilkesboro, North Carolina	Track map of North Wilkesboro Speedway.	Speedway Motorsports	19,800	NASCAR All-Star Race	TBA	FaithFest 250
Phoenix Raceway	1.000-mile (1.609 km) paved dogleg oval	Turns 1/2: 8° Backstretch: 3° Turns 3/4: 10°-11° Dogleg: 10°–11° Side Straight: 10° Frontstretch: 3°	Avondale, Arizona	Track map of Phoenix Raceway.	NASCAR	42,000	Straight Talk Wireless 500; Freeway Insurance 500	GOVX 200; Timberland PRO 200	Zero Carbon Bioethanol 150
Pocono Raceway	2.500-mile (4.023 km) paved triangular oval	Turn 1: 14° Turn 2: 8° Turn 3: 6° Straights: 0°	Long Pond, Pennsylvania	Track map of Pocono Raceway.	Mattco Inc.	76,812	The Great American Getaway 400	MillerTech Battery 250	TBA
Richmond Raceway	0.750-mile (1.207 km) paved D-shaped oval	Turns: 14° Frontstretch: 8° Backstretch: 2°	Richmond, Virginia	Track map of Richmond Raceway.	NASCAR	51,000	Cook Out 400	TBA	None
Sonoma Raceway	1.990-mile (3.203 km) paved road course	Clockwise	Sonoma, California	Track map of the Sonoma Raceway NASCAR Circuit.	Speedway Motorsports	47,000	Toyota/Save Mart 350	Pit Boss/FoodMaxx 250	None
St. Petersburg street circuit	1.800-mile (2.897 km) paved street/airfield circuit	Clockwise	St. Petersburg, Florida	Track map of the St. Petersburg street circuit.	Green Savoree St. Petersburg, LLC	N/A	None	None	OnlyBulls Green Flag 150
Talladega Superspeedway	2.660-mile (4.281 km) paved tri-oval	Turns: 33° Tri-Oval: 17° Backstretch: 3°	Lincoln, Alabama	Track map of Talladega Superspeedway.	NASCAR	80,000	Jack Link's 500; YellaWood 500	Ag-Pro 300; TPG 250	Love's RV Stop 225
Texas Motor Speedway	1.500-mile (2.414 km) paved quad-oval	Turns 1 and 2: 20° Turns 3 and 4: 24° Straights: 5°	Fort Worth, Texas	Track map of Texas Motor Speedway.	Speedway Motorsports	75,000	Würth 400	Andy's Frozen Custard 300	SpeedyCash.com 250
Watkins Glen International	2.450-mile (3.943 km) paved road course	Clockwise	Watkins Glen, New York	Track map of the Watkins Glen International NASCAR Circuit.	NASCAR	38,900	Go Bowling at The Glen	Mission 200 at The Glen	None
World Wide Technology Raceway	1.250-mile (2.012 km) paved egg-shaped oval	Turns 1 and 2: 11° Turns 3 and 4: 9° Straights: 3°	Madison, Illinois	Track map of World Wide Technology Raceway.	Curtis Francois	57,000	Enjoy Illinois 300	Nu Way 225	None

== Defunct or inactive regular NASCAR tracks ==
The following tables list all of the tracks previously used by NASCAR at least two times. Most of these racetracks are now closed or demolished.

=== Key to tables ===
- Track: Name of the track. Either the current name of the track (as it exists today) or the last known name of the track is shown.
- Type and layout: Approximate course length (in miles), shape, and surface type. For course length, the last known measurement provided by NASCAR is shown. Note that this figure may differ in various sources depending on the method that NASCAR or other sanctioning bodies have used to measure the track.
- Location: The state (or province, for Canadian tracks) and city (or nearest city) where each track is located.
- Named race(s): For many years, specific names have been given to races during a given season as a way of marketing the event. Where these names are known, they are noted next to the seasons in which that name was used.
- Season(s): NASCAR seasons in which the track hosted an event. Note that only points-paying races are counted as part of a given series' season; tracks where additional exhibition or special races have been held are included in a separate table.
- Notes: Any additional information or clarification that may be useful. This includes details on the track's current status, or whether the track saw further use in other NASCAR series.
- Permanently closed or demolished tracks are marked with grey background.

=== Road and street courses ===
Track	Type and layout	Direction	Location	Map	Named race(s)	Season(s)	Notes
Autódromo Hermanos Rodríguez	2.518-mile (4.052 km) paved road course	Clockwise	Mexico City, Mexico	Track map of Autódromo Hermanos Rodríguez.	Viva México 250 (Cup); The Chilango 150 (Xfinity)	2005–2008, 2025 (Xfinity); 2025 (Cup)	Track still active, hosts Mexico City Grand Prix for Formula One
Bridgehampton Race Circuit	2.850-mile (4.587 km) paved road course	Counter-clockwise	Bridgehampton, New York	Bridgehampton Road Course		1958; 1963–1964; 1966	Track closed for good in 1998. Site demolished for housing and golf course.
Circuit Gilles Villeneuve	2.710-mile (4.361 km) paved road course	Clockwise	Montréal, Québec, Canada	Circuit Gilles Villeneuve	NAPA Auto Presented By Dodge	2007–2012 (Xfinity)	Track still active, currently hosts Formula 1.
Charlotte Motor Speedway	2.280-mile (3.669 km) paved road course	Counter-clockwise	Concord, North Carolina	Track map of the Charlotte Motor Speedway "Roval".	Bank of America Roval 400; Blue Cross NC 250; Ecosave 250	2018–2025	Oval still active, road course disbanded by NASCAR in 2025.
Chicago Street Course	2.140-mile (3.444 km) street course	Clockwise	Chicago, Illinois	Track map of Chicago street circuit	Grant Park 165(Cup); The Loop 110 (Xfinity)	2023–2025	Streets still active.
Daytona Beach and Road Course	4.170-mile (6.711 km) mixed road course	Counter-clockwise	Daytona Beach, Florida	Daytona_Beach_and_Road_Course		1949–1958	Half the course was beach sand, other half was State Road A1A. Closed after Daytona was built. Last race was a Motorcycle race in 1960. Beach and highway still publicly accessible.
Daytona Road Course	3.570-mile (5.745 km) road course	Counter-clockwise	Daytona Beach, Florida	Daytona Intl. Speedway Infield Road Course	The Clash, O'Reilly Auto Parts 253, Super Start Batteries 188, BrakeBest Select 159	2020–2021	Road course used as a substitute during the COVID-19 pandemic. Taken off schedule for 2022 season. Still used such as in the Rolex 24
Heartland Motorsports Park	1.800-mile (2.897 km) paved road course	Counter-clockwise	Topeka, Kansas	Heartland Park Topeka Road Course	Heartland Tailgate 175 (1995), Lund Look 225 (1996), Lund Look 275K (1997–1998), O'Reilly Auto Parts 275 (1999)	1995–1999 (Truck)	Track complex was primarily used by NHRA. Closed in 2023.
Indianapolis Motor Speedway (Road Course)	2.439-mile (3.925 km)	Clockwise	Speedway, Indiana	Indianapolis Motor Speedway Infield Road Course	Verizon 200 at the Brickyard; Pennzoil 150	2021–2023 (Cup); 2020–2023 (Xfinity)	Track still active, NASCAR returned to the oval layout in 2024. Road Course is still used for Sonsio Grand Prix in IndyCar.
Mid-Ohio Sports Car Course	2.400-mile (3.862 km) paved road course	Clockwise	Lexington, Ohio	Mid-Ohio Sports Car Course	B&L Transport 170; O'Reilly Auto Parts 150	2013–2021 (Xfinity); 2022–2023 (Truck)	Track still active, currently hosts IndyCar Series.
Portland International Raceway	1.967-mile (3.166 km) paved road course	Clockwise	Portland, Oregon	Track map of Portland International Raceway	Pacific Office Automation 147	2022–2025 (Xfinity)	Track still active, currently hosts IndyCar Series.
Road America	4.048-mile (6.515 km) paved road course	Clockwise	Elkhart Lake, Wisconsin	Road America	Kwik Trip 250; Henry 180	1956, 2021–2022 (Cup); 2010–2023 (Xfinity)	Track still active, currently hosts IndyCar Series and ARCA Menards Series West.
Road Atlanta	2.520-mile (4.056 km) paved road course	Clockwise	Braselton, Georgia	Road Atlanta	Food Giant 300 (1986); Amoco 300 (1987)	1986–1987 (Xfinity)	Track still active, currently hosts IMSA WeatherTech SportsCar Championship.
Riverside International Raceway	2.631-mile (4.234 km) paved road course	Clockwise	Riverside, California	Riverside Intl. Raceway	Crown America 500 (1958); Riverside 500 (1963); Golden State 400 (1963); Motor Trend 500 (1964–1971); Falstaff 400 (1970); Golden State 400 (1971–1972); Winston Western 500 (1972–1987); Tuborg 400 (1973–1975); Riverside 400 (1976); NAPA 400 (1977–1979); Warner W. Hodgdon 400 (1980–1981); Budweiser 400 (1982–1988)	1958; 1961; 1963–1988	Demolished. Now site of a shopping mall and houses.
Willow Springs International Motorsports Park	2.500-mile (4.023 km) road course	Clockwise	Rosamond, California	Willow Springs Road Course		1956–1957	During NASCAR years, track used an oiled-dirt surface; now paved; remains active. Has raced some NASCAR West Series competition.

=== Superspeedways ===
Track	Type and layout	Banking	Location	Map	Named race(s)	Season(s)	Notes
California Speedway (formerly Auto Club Speedway)	2.000-mile (3.219 km) paved D-shaped oval		Fontana, California	California Speedway oval	Pala Casino 400; Production Alliance Group 300; San Bernardino County 200	1997–2023 (Cup); 1997–2023 (Xfinity); 1997–2009 (Truck)	Closed after the 2023 event. Large parts of the superspeedway have already been removed. The construction of the new short track has not yet started.
Ontario Motor Speedway	2.500-mile (4.023 km) paved rectangular oval		Ontario, California	Ontario Motor Speedway oval	Miller High Life 500 (1971–1972); Los Angeles Times 500 (1974–1980)	1971–1972 (Cup); 1974–1980 (Cup)	Closed in 1980; demolished in 1981; now the site of Toyota Arena.
Texas World Speedway	2.000-mile (3.219 km) paved D-shaped oval		College Station, Texas	Texas World Speedway oval	Texas 500 (1969); Texas 500 (1971–1972); Lone Star 500 (1972); Alamo 500 (1973); Texas 400 (1979); NASCAR 400 (1980–1981)	1969 (Cup); 1971–1973 (Cup); 1979–1981 (Cup)	Closed in 1989; reopened in 1993, closed again in 2015. Now the site of a housing development.

=== Paved intermediate tracks ===
Track	Type and layout	Banking	Location	Map	Named race(s)	Season(s)	Notes
Chicago Motor Speedway	1.029-mile (1.656 km) paved paperclip-shaped oval		Cicero, Illinois	Chicago Motor Speedway oval	Sears Craftsman 175	2000–2001 (Truck)	Track demolished in 2009, now the site of a Walmart.
Kentucky Speedway	1.500-mile (2.414 km) paved tri-oval		Sparta, Kentucky	Kentucky Speedway oval	Quaker State 400; Alsco 300; Buckle Up in Your Truck 225	2001–2020 (Xfinity, Truck); 2011–2020 (Cup)	Track still active. Not used for racing since 2021.
Marchbanks Speedway	1.400-mile (2.253 km) paved triangular oval		Hanford, California	Marchbanks Speedway (Hanford Motor Speedway)	California 250 (1960)	1960–1961 (Cup)	The length of the oval is disputed in various sources; sometimes 1.4 miles and sometimes 1.375 miles are used. Intermediate track built in 1960; complex demolished in 1984.
Milwaukee Mile	1.015-mile (1.633 km) paved oval		West Allis, Wisconsin	Track map of The Milwaukee Mile	LiUNA! 175	1984–1985; 1993–2009 (Xfinity); 1995–2009; 2023–2024 (Truck)	Track still active. Used for IndyCar racing since 2024.
Nazareth Speedway	1.000-mile (1.609 km) paved dogleg oval		Nazareth, Pennsylvania	Nazareth Speedway oval	Goulds Pumps/ITT Industries 200; Chevy Silverado 200	1988–2004 (Xfinity); 1996–2001 (Truck)	Closed in 2004 and grandstands were moved to Watkins Glen in 2005, still not demolished but left to decay. Ground is up for sale for non-racing purposes.
Pikes Peak International Raceway	1.000-mile (1.609 km) paved D-shaped oval		Fountain, Colorado	Pikes Peak Intl. Speedway oval	Lycos.com 250 (1998); NAPA Autocare 250 (1999–2001); NetZero 250 (2002); Trim Spa Dream Body 250 (2003); ITT Industries & Goulds Pumps Salute to the Troops 250 (2004–2005)	1998–2005 (Xfinity)	Track closed in 2005 and reopened with new owners. Sales contract prohibits the holding of national or international races with more than 5000 spectators. Therefore, only used for local racing series or as a test track. The racetrack is scheduled to be permanently closed and dismantled in 2026.
Raleigh Speedway	1.000-mile (1.609 km) paved oval		Raleigh, North Carolina		Raleigh 300 (1953); Raleigh 250 (1954; 1956–1958)	1953–1958 (Cup)	Closed in 1958. Track demolished in 1967. Now the site of an industrial park.
Rockingham Speedway	1.017-mile (1.637 km); 0.940-mile (1.513 km) paved D-shaped oval	Turns: 22° and 25° Straights: 8°	Rockingham, North Carolina	Track map of Rockingham Speedway (North Carolina Speedway)	Subway 400; Pop Secret Microwave Popcorn 400 (Cup); North Carolina Education Lottery 250; Target House 200 (O'Reilly); Black's Tire 200 (Trucks)	1965-2004 (Cup); 1982-2026 (O'Reilly); 2011-2026 (Trucks)	Track removed in 2026 due to ownership issues.
Trenton Speedway	1.500-mile (2.414 km) paved kidney bean shaped oval		Trenton, New Jersey	Trenton Speedway oval	Northern 300 (1967–1969); Schaefer 300 (1970); Northern 300 (1971–1972)	1958–1959 (Cup); 1967–1972 (Cup)	During NASCAR years, began as 1.000-mile oval; reworked to 1.500-mile "peanut" oval in 1969; closed in 1980. Now the site of a sculpture garden and a housing development.
Walt Disney World Speedway	1.000-mile (1.609 km) paved triangular oval		Bay Lake, Florida	Walt Disney World Speedway oval	Chevy Trucks Challenge	1997–1998 (Truck)	Track razed in 2015 to make room for parking lot.

=== Dirt intermediate tracks ===
Track	Type and layout	Banking	Location	Map	Named race(s)	Season(s)	Notes
Arizona State Fairgrounds	1.000-mile dirt oval		Phoenix, Arizona		Copper Cup Championship (1960)	1951; 1955–1956; 1960	Closed in 1963; reopened in 1985 as 0.125-mile dirt oval; remains active.
Bay Meadows Racetrack	1.000-mile dirt oval		San Mateo, California			1954–1956	Conducted final horse race in August 2008; subsequently razed. Now a housing development.
California State Fairgrounds	1.000-mile dirt oval		Sacramento, California			1956–1961	Closed in 1970 when fairgrounds moved to new location; site now University of California, Davis School of Medicine. The new location also includes a one-mile dirt oval and has hosted both USAC Silver Crown and AMA Grand National Championship motorcycle racing.
Lakewood Speedway	1.000-mile dirt oval		Atlanta, Georgia			1951–1954; 1956; 1958–1959	Closed after 1960; selected events held until 1979; now the site of Lakewood Park in Atlanta.
Langhorne Speedway	1.000-mile dirt oval		Langhorne, Pennsylvania			1949–1957	Paved in 1965; closed after 1971; now the site of a shopping center.
Memphis-Arkansas Speedway	1.500-mile dirt oval		LeHi, Arkansas		Mid-South 250 (1954–1955)	1954–1957	Closed due to owner's inability to afford the $100,000 cost to pave the speedway, as the dirt had become unmanagable and dangerous; layout remains intact.
Michigan State Fairgrounds Speedway	1.000-mile dirt oval		Detroit, Michigan		Motor City 250 (1951–1952)	1951–1952	Now the site of an Amazon warehouse.
Syracuse Mile	1.000-mile dirt oval		Syracuse, New York			1955–1957	Track remained active until 2015. Was razed in 2016 as a part of a redevelopment project of the NYSF

=== Paved short tracks ===
Track	Type and layout	Banking	Location	Map	Named race(s)	Season(s)	Notes
Asheville–Weaverville Speedway	0.540-mile paved oval		Weaverville, North Carolina	Asheville-Weaverville – USGS – B650110209713	Western North Carolina 500 (1958–1969)	1957–1969	Held races from 1951 to 1957 as a dirt oval. Now the site of North Buncombe High School.
Augusta International Raceway	0.500-mile paved oval		Augusta, Georgia		Georgia Cracker 300 (1966); Augusta 300 (1967); Dixie 250 (1968); Augusta 200 (1968); Cracker 200 (1969)	1964–1969 (oval)	Complex closed in 1970; Now the site of Diamond Lakes Regional Park.
Beltsville Speedway	0.500-mile paved oval		Laurel, Maryland	Beltsville	Beltsville 200 (1966–1967); Maryland 200 (1966); Beltsville 300 (1968–1970); Maryland 300 (1967–1969)	1965–1970	Closed after 1978; now the site of Capitol College.
Boyd's Speedway	0.333-mile paved oval		Ringgold, Georgia		Confederate 200 (1962); Confederate 200 (1964)	1962; 1964	Active until April 2023, recently sold and season has been postponed until further notice.
Caffeine and Octane's Lanier Raceway	0.375-mile paved oval		Gainesville, Georgia			1988–1992 (Xfinity)	Track has been closed except for special events; none scheduled.
Caraway Speedway	0.455-mile paved oval		Asheboro, North Carolina			1982–1983 (Xfinity)	Still active in NASCAR feeder series.
Champion Speedway	0.333-mile paved oval		Fayetteville, North Carolina			1958–1959	Closed in 1959; land is now an industrial site.
Colorado National Speedway	0.375-mile paved oval		Erie, Colorado		Total Petroleum 200 (1995); Colorado 200 (1996–1997)	1995–1997 (Truck)	Remains active, current hosts ARCA West.
Columbia Speedway	0.500-mile paved oval		Columbia, South Carolina		Sandlapper 200 (1971); Columbia 200 (1971)	1971	Paved in 1970, Closed in 1977. Track restoration in progress for historical car shows.
Dayton Speedway	0.500-mile paved oval		Dayton, Ohio			1950–1952	Closed in 1982; now the site of a landfill.
Dog Track Speedway	0.333-mile paved oval		Moyock, North Carolina		Moyock 300 (1964–1965); Tidewater 300 (1965)	1964–1966	Closed c. 1974. Now the site of a housing development.
Dominion Raceway	0.333-mile paved oval		Manassas, Virginia		Old Dominion 400 (1964)	1958; 1963–1966	Closed in 2013; track razed for housing development in 2015.
Evergreen Speedway	0.646-mile paved oval		Monroe, Washington	Evergreen	Mark Galloway 150 Shootout; NASCAR Summer Showdown 200; NAPA Auto Parts 150 / Toyota 100	1995–2000 (Truck)	Track still active. Hosts NASCAR Local Racing Series.
Flemington Speedway	0.625-mile paved oval		New Jersey (Flemington)	Flemington		1995–1998 (Truck)	Track closed in 2002, demolished in 2005. Now the site of a Lowe's.
Greenville-Pickens Speedway	0.500-mile paved oval		Greenville, South Carolina		Greenville 200 (1971); Pickens 200 (1971)	1971 (Cup); 1983 (Xfinity)	Dormant since 2023, not used for racing.
Gresham Motorsports Park	0.500-mile paved oval		Jefferson, Georgia		Peach State 200 (1968); Jeffco 200 (1969)	1968–1969 (Cup); 1986–1987 (Xfinity)	Now Gresham Motorsports Park, track reconfigured in 2009. Racing ceased in 2012 due to low car counts.
Harris Speedway	0.333-mile paved oval		Harris, North Carolina			1964–1965	Remains active.
Hickory Motor Speedway	0.362-mile paved oval		Hickory, North Carolina		Buddy Shuman Memorial (1969–1971); Hickory 250 (1962–1967); Hickory 250 (1969); Hickory 276 (1970–1971)	1969–1971 (Cup); 1982–1998 (Xfinity)	Remains active, currently hosts ARCA East.
I-70 Motorsports Park	0.543-mile paved oval		Odessa, Missouri	I70	O'Reilly Auto Parts 200	1995–1999 (Truck)	Closed in 2008. Reopened as a 3/8 mile dirt track and drag strip in 2021.
Islip Speedway	0.200-mile paved oval		Islip, New York		Islip 300 (1967–1968); Islip 250 (1971)	1964–1968; 1971	Closed after 1984; now the site of a factory.
Kingsport Speedway	0.337-mile paved oval		Kingsport, Tennessee		Kingsport 250 (1969); Kingsport 100 (1970); Kingsport 300 (1971)	1969–1971	Reopened in 2010 after 8 years of inactivity.
Langley Speedway	0.395-mile paved oval		Hampton, Virginia		Crabber 250 (1968); Tidewater 375 (1969); Tidewater 300 (1970)	1968–1970 (Cup); 1982–1988 (Xfinity)	Remains active as a host to several NASCAR feeder series and weekly events.
Louisville Motor Speedway	0.438-mile paved oval		Louisville, Kentucky			1988–1989 (Xfinity)	Also hosted Truck Series racing from 1996 to 1999 in a 0.375-mile configuration. Closed in 2000 after Kentucky Speedway opened; track was demolished and is now the site of an industrial park.
Mansfield Motor Speedway	0.440-mile paved oval		Mansfield, Ohio	Mansfield	UAW / GM Ohio 250 (2004–2005); City of Mansfield 250 (2006); Ohio 250 (2007–2008)	2004–2008 (Truck)	Closed in 2010; reopened in 2015. Was converted back to a dirt track for the 2016 season. Track closed permanently in 2019.
Memphis International Raceway	0.750-mile paved oval		Millington, Tennessee	Memphis	Sam's Town 250 (1999–2001;2005–2007); Sam's Town 250 Benefiting St. Jude (2002–2004); Kroger On Track For The Cure 250 (2008–2009); Memphis 200 (1998–1999, 2001); Quaker State 200 by AutoZone (2000); O'Reilly Auto Parts 200 (2002); O'Reilly 200 (2003–2004, 2006–2008); O'Reilly 200 Presented by Valvoline (2005); MemphisTravel.com 200 Pres. by O'Reilly Auto Parts (2009)	1999–2009 (Xfinity); 1998–2009 (Truck)	Closed in 2009 and was reopened in 2011 for some ARCA events. In 2022 the track was sold and demolition is planned to make room for a warehouse.
Mesa Marin Raceway	0.500-mile paved oval		Bakersfield, California	Mesa Marin		1995–2001; 2003 (Truck)	Track closed and demolished in 2005 due to nearby housing development. Replaced by Kern County Raceway Park.
Middle Georgia Raceway	0.548-mile paved oval		Byron, Georgia		Speedy Morelock 200 (1966); Macon 300 (1967–1969); Middle Georgia 500 (1968); Georgia 500 (1969–1971)	1966–1971	Closed after 1971; reopened 1988, closed for good in 2005 due to new noise ordinances being imposed on the track. Track has sat abandoned since.
Montgomery Motor Speedway	0.500-mile paved oval		Montgomery, Alabama		Alabama 200 (1969)	1956; 1967–1969	Remains intact; racing returned in 2009 under new ownership.
Motor Mile Speedway	0.416-mile paved oval		Dublin, Virginia			1988–1992 (Xfinity)	Track still active; closed briefly in 2018 but reopened in 2019. Some National Series teams still use for testing, host to several NASCAR feeder series and weekly events, formerly known as New River Valley Speedway.
Myrtle Beach Speedway	0.538-mile paved oval		Myrtle Beach, South Carolina	Myrtle Beach	Myrtle Beach 250 (NNS, 1988–2000)	1988–2000 (Xfinity)	Closed in 2020, demolished in 2021.
Nashville Fairgrounds Speedway	0.596-mile paved oval		Nashville, Tennessee	Nashville	Nashville 500 (1961–1962); Nashville 400 (1963); Nashville 400 (1965); Nashville 400 (1967–1969); Nashville 420 (1970–1983); Music City USA 420 (1973–1980); Melling Tool 420 (1981); Cracker Barrel 420 (1982); Marty Robbins 420 (1983); Coors 420 (1984); Pepsi 420 (1984)	1958–1984 (Cup); 1995–2000 (Xfinity)	Remains active, Currently plays host to the Music City 150 ARCA East race, and is the home of the All American 400 (Which returned to its 400 lap format in 2016)
New Asheville Speedway	0.333-mile paved oval		Asheville, North Carolina		Asheville 300 (1967–1971)	1962–1971 (Cup); 1982 (Xfinity)	Shawna Robinson became the first woman to win a NASCAR Touring Series race when she won a Dash race in 1988; Pavement still used as Asheville Velodrome.
Old Bridge Stadium	0.500-mile paved oval		Old Bridge, New Jersey		Fireball Roberts 200 (1964); Old Bridge 200 (1965)	1956–1958; 1963–1965	Closed in 1968. Now the site of an apartment complex.
Ona Speedway	0.438-mile paved oval		Ona, West Virginia		Mountaineer 300 (1963); Mountaineer 500 (1964); West Virginia 300 (1970); West Virginia 500 (1971)	1963–1964; 1970–1971 (Cup)	Closed in 1972; reopened in 1995 as Ona Speedway.
Orange County Speedway	0.375-mile paved oval		Rougemont, North Carolina	Orange County		1983–1994 (Xfinity)	Track still active. Closed in 2003, reopened in 2006 with ASA Member Track sanctioning.
Oxford Plains Speedway	0.333-mile paved oval		Oxford, Maine		Maine 300 (1967–1968)	1966–1968 (Cup); 1986–1991 (Xfinity)	Remains active.
Palm Beach Speedway	0.500-mile paved oval		Palm Beach, Florida			1956	Demolished in 1984. Now the site of the South Florida Fairgrounds.
Portland Speedway	0.500-mile paved oval		Portland, Oregon			1956–1957 (Cup); 1995–1998 (Truck)	Closed in 2002, demolished to build warehouses.
Saugus Speedway	0.333-mile paved oval		Santa Clarita, California			1995 (Truck)	Closed midway through 1995 season. Track site still used as a swap meet.
Savannah Speedway	0.500-mile paved oval		Savannah, Georgia		Savannah 200 (1970)	1969–1970	Closed in 1981; apparently reopened but closed again by 2004; track site is currently under water.
Smoky Mountain Raceway	0.520-mile paved oval		Maryville, Tennessee		Smoky 200 (1968–1969); Maryville 300 (1969); Maryville 200 (1970–1971); East Tennessee 200 (1970)	1968–1971	Paved in 1968; remains active; has been reverted in 1972 to its original dirt surface.
South Boston Speedway	0.375-mile paved oval (1962–1971); 0.400-mile paved oval (1982–2000)		South Boston, Virginia	South Boston	South Boston 400 (1963); South Boston 100 (1969); Halifax County 100 (1970–1971)	1961–1964; 1968–1971 (Cup); 1982–2000 (Xfinity)	Remains active as a host to several NASCAR feeder series and weekly events.
Southside Speedway	0.333-mile paved oval		Richmond, Virginia			1961–1963	Closed briefly for the 2011 season due to the health of one of the owners; had a shortened season then a full season in 2012. Closed permanently in 2021.
Starkey Speedway	0.250-mile paved oval		Roanoke, Virginia			1958; 1961–1962; 1964	Closed in 1966. A park was built on the site.
Thompson Speedway Motorsports Park	0.625-mile paved oval		Thompson, Connecticut	Thompson	Thompson Speedway 200 (1969–1970)	1951; 1969–1970	Remains active as home to several NASCAR feeder series.
Tucson Speedway	0.375-mile paved oval		Tucson, Arizona			1995–1997 (Truck)	Track still active. Was closed briefly.
Volusia Speedway Park	0.500-mile paved oval		Barberville, Florida			1989–1992 (Xfinity)	Originally a dirt track, the track was paved in 1988. Has reverted to a dirt track and is owned by World Racing Group (World of Outlaws).

=== Dirt short tracks ===
Track	Type and layout	Banking	Location	Map	Named race(s)	Season(s)	Notes
Albany-Saratoga Speedway	0.400-mile dirt oval.		Malta, New York		Albany-Saratoga 250 (1970–1971)	1970–1971	Track was dirt after 1978; converted back to asphalt in 2009; returned to dirt in 2012.
Altamont–Schenectady Fairgrounds	0.500-mile dirt oval		Altamont, New York			1951; 1955	Auto racing discontinued after 1955. Footprint of track, repurposed, still exists.
Ascot Park	0.400-mile dirt oval		Los Angeles, California			1957; 1959; 1961	Race held in 1957 under the track name Los Angeles Speedway; race in 1959 under the name New Ascot Stadium. Closed in 1990. Now the site of a car auction lot.
Asheville–Weaverville Speedway	0.540-mile dirt oval		Weaverville, North Carolina	Asheville	Western North Carolina 500 (1958–1969); Fireball 300 (1966–1969)	1951–1957	Held races from 1957 to 1969 as a paved oval. Now the site of North Buncombe High School.
Augusta International Raceway	0.500-mile dirt oval		Augusta, Georgia			1962–1963	Oval was originally dirt and paved in 1964; complex closed in 1970; Now the site of Diamond Lakes Regional Park.
Birmingham International Raceway	0.500-mile dirt oval		Birmingham, Alabama		Birmingham 200 (1965)	1958; 1961; 1963–1965; 1967–1968	Track demolished in 2009 by city.
Bristol Motor Speedway (Dirt)	0.533-mile dirt oval		Bristol, Tennessee		Food City Dirt Race (Cup); WeatherGuard Truck Race on Dirt (Trucks)	2021–2023	Temporary dirt track, track still active. NASCAR will be on the concrete instead of dirt starting in 2024.
Canfield Speedway/Canfield Fairgrounds	0.500-mile dirt oval		Canfield, Ohio		Poor Man's 500 (1950–1952)	1950–1952	ARCA & USAC ran on an inner mixed .250 mi oval until it closed to auto racing in 1973. It is still used for horse racing.
Carrell Speedway	0.500-mile dirt oval		Gardena, California			1951; 1954	Closed in late 1954 to make way for the Artesia Freeway.
Central City Speedway	0.500-mile dirt oval		Macon, Georgia			1951–1954	Closed during 1956.
Charlotte Speedway	0.750-mile dirt oval		Charlotte, North Carolina	Charlotte Speedway		1949–1956	Closed in 1956. What's left of the track is now a part of I-85.
Cleveland County Fairgrounds	0.500-mile dirt oval		Shelby, North Carolina			1956–1957; 1965	Half-mile track closed at some point. A 1/4-mile dirt track was built at the same spot to hold local races.
Coastal Speedway	0.500-mile dirt oval		Myrtle Beach, South Carolina			1956–1957	Replaced by Myrtle Beach Speedway. Now a commercial district.
Columbia Speedway	0.500-mile dirt oval		Columbia, South Carolina		Arclite 200 (1962); Sandlapper 200 (1951, 1955–1970); Columbia 200 (1964–1970)	1951–1970	Paved in 1970/71
Concord Speedway	0.500-mile dirt oval		Concord, North Carolina		Lee Kirby Memorial (1959); Textile 250 (1964)	1956–1959 (Concord I); 1962 (II); 1964 (II)	There have been three tracks with the name; Concord Speedway I closed in the early 1960s; Concord Speedway II closed in 1978 and development took over; a replacement, the third track to carry the name, opened in 1979, was paved in 1987, and remained active for special event races. Closed in 2019.
Dog Track Speedway	0.250-mile dirt oval		Moyock, North Carolina			1962–1963	Paved and lengthened in 1964, closed c. 1974.
Eldora Speedway	0.500-mile (0.805 km) dirt oval		New Weston, Ohio	Map Overview	Eldora Dirt Derby	2013–2019 (Trucks)	Track still active, no race in 2020 because of the COVID-19 pandemic. Did not return to racing in 2021, but continues to host numerous racing events, including the Eldora Million, World 100, and Kings Royal.
Fonda Speedway	0.500-mile dirt oval		Fonda, New York		Fonda 200 (1968)	1955; 1966–1968	Remains active.
Winston-Salem Fairgrounds	0.500-mile dirt oval		Winston-Salem, North Carolina			1955	Auto racing discontinued after 1963.
Ft. Miami Speedway	0.500-mile dirt oval		Toledo, Ohio			1951–1952	Shortened to 0.375-mile length in 1957; closed after 1958.
Grand Rapids Speedrome	0.500-mile dirt oval		Grand Rapids, Michigan			1951; 1954	Closed in 1966 to make way for U.S. Route 131.
Greensboro Agricultural Fairgrounds	0.333-mile dirt oval		Greensboro, North Carolina			1957–1958	Now site of Greensboro Coliseum Complex.
Greenville-Pickens Speedway	0.500-mile dirt oval		Greenville, South Carolina		Greenville 200 (1969–1970)	1955–1956; 1958–1970	Paved in 1971
Hamburg Speedway	0.500-mile dirt oval		Hamburg, New York			1949–1950	Remains active for harness racing.
Heidelberg Raceway	0.250-mile dirt oval		Pittsburgh, Pennsylvania			1949; 1951; 1959–1960	Closed after 1973. Now the site of a shopping center.
Hickory Motor Speedway	0.500-mile dirt oval (1953–1954); 0.400-mile dirt oval (1955–1968)		Hickory, North Carolina		Buddy Shuman Memorial (1956); Buddy Shuman Memorial (1960–1968)	1953–1968	Paved in 1969
Jacksonville Speedway	0.500-mile dirt oval		Jacksonville, North Carolina		Jacksonville 100 (1957 & 1964)	1957; 1964	Closed after 1964; site of Richard Petty's first championship.
Speedway Park (1945–1964); Jacksonville Speedway (1964–1969)	0.500-mile dirt oval		Jacksonville, Florida		Jacksonville 200 (1964)	1951–1952; 1954–1955; 1961; 1964	Closed in August 1969. Site of Wendell Scott's historic win. Now the site of an apartment complex.
Knoxville Raceway	0.500-mile (0.805 km) dirt oval		Knoxville, Iowa		Clean Harbors 150	2021–2022 (Trucks)	
Lakeview Speedway	0.750-mile dirt oval		Mobile, Alabama			1951	Closed in 1972.
Langley Speedway	0.400-mile dirt oval		Hampton, Virginia		Tidewater 250 (1964–1967)	1964–1967	Paved in 1968
Lancaster Speedway	0.500-mile dirt oval		Lancaster, South Carolina			1957	Remains active.
Lincoln Speedway	0.500-mile dirt oval		Hanover, Pennsylvania		Pennsylvania 200 Classic (1964–1965)	1955–1958; 1964–1965	Remains active.
Marchbanks Speedway	0.500-mile dirt oval		Hanford, California	Marchbanks		1951	Originally a 0.500-mile dirt oval
Martinsville Speedway	0.500-mile dirt oval		Ridgeway, Virginia			1949–1955	Paved in 1956
Monroe County Fairgrounds	0.500-mile dirt oval		Rochester, New York			1950–1956; 1958	Track closed c. 1962; briefly reopened during 1981. Now the site of a daycare.
Montgomery Motor Speedway	0.500-mile dirt oval		Montgomery, Alabama)			1955	Paved in 1956
Morristown Speedway	0.500-mile dirt oval		Morristown, New Jersey)			1951–1955	Closed in 1955.
Myrtle Beach Speedway	0.500-mile dirt oval		South Carolina (Myrtle Beach)	Myrtle Beach	Carolina Pride 250 (NNS, 1988–2000)	1958–1965 (Cup)	Paved in 1987. Closed in 2020.
Norfolk Speedway	0.400-mile dirt oval		Norfolk, Virginia			1956–1957	Closed sometime after 1959.
State Fairgrounds Speedway	0.500-mile dirt oval		Raleigh, North Carolina		North State 200 (1969); Home State 200 (1970)	1955; 1969–1970	Track closed after 1970.
Oglethorpe Speedway Park	0.500-mile dirt oval		Pooler, Georgia			1954–1955	Track closed after 2021.
Oakland Speedway	0.625-mile mixed oval		San Leandro, California			1951; 1954	Straights were paved, turns were dirt; closed after 1955; now the site of Bayfair Center.
Occoneechee Speedway	0.930-mile dirt oval		Hillsborough, North Carolina		Joe Weatherly Memorial 150 (1964); Joe Weatherly Memorial 150 (1966); Hillsborough 150 (1967–1968)	1949–1968	Closed in 1968. Restoration to the track is currently underway.
Palm Beach Speedway	0.500-mile dirt oval		Palm Beach, Florida			1952–1955	Paved in 1956; demolished in 1984.
Piedmont Interstate Fairgrounds	0.500-mile dirt oval		Spartanburg, South Carolina			1953–1966	Closed c. 1986. Often used for vintage car events.
Redwood Acres Raceway	0.625-mile dirt oval		Eureka, California			1956–1957	Remains active; now a .375-mile paved oval.
Reading Fairgrounds Speedway	0.500-mile dirt oval		Reading, Pennsylvania			1958–1959	Closed after 1979. Was formerly the site of the Fairgrounds Square Mall, which has now also been torn down.
Savannah Speedway	0.500-mile dirt oval		Savannah, Georgia		St. Patrick's Day 200 (1962); Sunshine 200 (1964); Savannah 200 (1964)	1962–1964; 1967	Paved in 1969; closed in 1981; apparently reopened but closed again by 2004; Site of track is currently under water.
Smoky Mountain Raceway	0.500-mile dirt oval		Maryville, Tennessee		East Tennessee 200 (1966–1967); Smoky 200 (1966–1967)	1965–1967	Paved in 1968; remains active; has since been reverted to its original dirt surface.
South Boston Speedway	0.250-mile dirt oval		South Boston, Virginia			1960	Paved in 1961
Southern States Fairgrounds	0.500-mile dirt oval		Charlotte, North Carolina			1954–1961	Closed after 1960.
Tar Heel Speedway	0.250-mile dirt oval		Randleman, North Carolina		Turkey Day 200 (1963)	1963	Closed after 1967; possibly hosted one racing event in 1975.
Tennessee-Carolina Speedway	0.500-mile dirt oval		Newport, Tennessee			1956–1957	Closed in 1967, some traces of the track still viewable in Cocke County Fairgrounds. New track open north of town in 1969, closed for facility renovations and upgrades in 2015.
Tri-City Speedway	0.500-mile dirt oval		High Point, North Carolina			1953; 1955	Closed by the 1960s.
Valdosta 75 Speedway	0.500-mile dirt oval		Valdosta, Georgia			1962; 1964–1965	Closed in 1966.
Virginia State Fairgrounds	0.500-mile dirt oval		Richmond, Virginia			1953–1968	Paved in 1968
Wilson Speedway	0.500-mile dirt oval		Wilson, North Carolina			1951–1954; 1956–1960	Closed in 1989.

== Tracks used one time for NASCAR championship event ==
The following table shows all tracks that had only one single points paying event in NASCAR (Cup, Xfinity, Trucks) and were not visited again. Some racetracks are temporary and were built on airfields or fairgrounds or in stadiums.

Track	Type and layout	Banking	Location	Map	Named race	Season	Notes
Air Base Speedway	0.500-mile dirt oval 0.250-mile dirt oval		South Carolina (Greenville)	Air Base Speedway		1951	One Grand National race held on August 25, 1951. (Previously often misreported as held at the Greenville–Pickens Speedway.)
Airborne Speedway	0.500-mile dirt oval		New York (Plattsburgh)			1955	Paved in 1961; Converted back to dirt in 2017; remains active currently running the NASCAR Whelen All-American Series.
Augusta International Raceway	3.000-mile (4.828 km) mixed road course		Georgia (Augusta)	1964SCCAFlyer-705x585	Augusta 510	1964	Road course abandoned after 1964; complex closed in 1970; Now the site of Diamond Lakes Regional Park.
Bainbridge Fairgrounds	1.000-mile dirt oval		Ohio (Bainbridge)			1951	Operated from 1946 to 1969. Now the site of a shopping mall.
Bloomsburg Fairgrounds	0.500-mile dirt oval		Pennsylvania (Bloomsburg)			1953	Auto racing discontinued after 1985.
Bremerton Raceway / Kitsap County Airport	0.900-mile (1.448 km) road course		Washington (Bremerton)			1957	Temporary airport course. Used for racing until 1958.
Buffalo Civic Stadium	0.250-mile cinder oval		New York (Buffalo)			1958	In later years, home to the Buffalo Bills in both the AFL (1960–69) and NFL (1970–72); demolished in 1988. Now the site of a park.
Canadian National Exhibition Stadium	0.333-mile paved oval		Ontario (Toronto)		Jim Mideon 500 (1958)	1958	Stadium oval track closed in 1966; reopened in 1990 and 1997; stadium demolished in 1999; now the site of BMO Field. Parking lot and surrounding roads form active street circuit used since 1986 for CART, Champ Car, and now IndyCar races. Hosted Série NASCAR Pinty's Series events in 2010 and 2011, and returned in 2016.
Chisholm Speedway	0.500-mile dirt oval		Alabama (Montgomery)			1956	Closed during 1978. Now the site of the Montgomery Zoo.
Columbus Speedway	0.500-mile dirt oval		Georgia (Columbus)			1951	Closed during the 1950s.
Corbin Speedway	0.500-mile dirt oval		Kentucky (Corbin)			1954	Closed during the 1960s; reopened at some point and is currently active. Track was paved at some point and shortened to 0.25-mile.
Davenport Speedway	0.500-mile dirt oval		Iowa (Davenport)			1953	Remains active.
Dixie Speedway	0.250-mile paved oval		Alabama (Birmingham)			1960	Closed after 1983, reopened as Sayre Speedway in 1988.
Five Flags Speedway	0.500-mile paved oval		Florida (Pensacola)			1953	Only Grand National race run two weeks after opening. Remains active, with signature Snowball Derby event in December.
Gamecock Speedway	0.250-mile dirt oval		South Carolina (Sumter)			1960	Remains active as Sumter Speedway.
Gastonia Fairgrounds	0.333-mile dirt oval		North Carolina (Gastonia)			1958	Closed during the 1980s. Now Gaston Christian School.
Golden Gate Speedway	0.333-mile paved oval		Florida (Tampa)			1963	Closed in 1978; reopened in 1981; closed again in 1984.
Harnett Speedway	0.500-mile dirt oval		North Carolina (Spring Lake)			1953	Closed c. 1970.
Hartsville Speedway	0.333-mile dirt oval		South Carolina (Hartsville)			1961	Closed c. 1962.
Hayloft Speedway	0.500-mile dirt oval		Georgia (Augusta)			1952	Closed in 1955, Gordon Park Speedway built on site in the 1980s, which has also since closed.
Huntsville Speedway	0.250-mile paved oval		Alabama (Huntsville)			1962	Remains active.
Las Vegas Park Speedway	1.000-mile dirt oval		Nevada (Las Vegas)			1955	Demolished; now the site of the Las Vegas Country Club.
Lincoln City Fairgrounds	0.500-mile dirt oval		Nebraska (North Platte)			1953	Remains active.
Linden Airport	2.000-mile (3.219 km) paved road course		New Jersey (Linden)			1954	Temporary airport course.
Louisiana Fairgrounds	0.500-mile dirt oval		Louisiana (Shreveport)			1953	Facility remains active; track closed in 1980.
McCormick Field	0.250-mile paved oval		North Carolina (Asheville)			1958	Remains active as home to the Asheville Tourists baseball team; auto racing discontinued in 1959.
Merced Fairgrounds Speedway	0.500-mile dirt oval		California (Merced)			1956	Located within Merced County Fairgrounds; rebuilt to 0.375-mile length in 1991; remains active.
Meyer Speedway	0.500-mile paved oval		Texas (Houston)		Space City 300 (1971)	1971	Closed in 1979 and demolished in the early 1980s. A school was built on the northern half of the site in 2020, but the southern half remains undeveloped, with the imprint of the track and some roads inside the oval just barely visible.
Monroe Speedway	0.500-mile dirt oval		Michigan (Monroe)			1952	Closed c. 1954.
Montgomery Air Base	2.000-mile (3.219 km) paved road course		New York (Montgomery)		Empire State 200 (1960)	1960	Temporary airport course.
New Bradford Speedway	0.333-mile dirt oval		Pennsylvania (Bradford)			1958	Remains active.
Newberry Speedway	0.500-mile dirt oval		South Carolina (Newberry)			1957	Closed c. 1979.
Norwood Arena	0.250-mile paved oval		Massachusetts (Norwood)		Yankee 500 (1961)	1961	Closed in 1972; now an industrial park.
Oklahoma State Fairgrounds	0.500-mile dirt oval		Oklahoma (Oklahoma City)			1956	Not active since 2009; track was demolished in early August 2010.
Pine Grove Speedway	0.500-mile dirt oval		Pennsylvania (Shippenville)			1951	Closed during the 1960s.
Playland Park Speedway	0.500-mile dirt oval		Indiana (South Bend)			1952	Was located within Playland Park; reportedly closed c. 1956.
Powell Motor Speedway	0.500-mile dirt oval		Ohio (Columbus)			1953	Closed in 1959; smaller tracks used same site until 1965. Track was sold to developers in 2001 and torn down to make room for a housing development.
Princess Anne Speedway	0.500-mile dirt oval		Virginia (Norfolk)			1953	Closed in 1954.
Rapid Valley Speedway	0.500-mile dirt oval		South Dakota (Rapid City)			1953	Remains active.
Salisbury Superspeedway	0.625-mile dirt oval		North Carolina (Salisbury)			1958	Closed in 1961.
Santa Clara County Fairgrounds	0.500-mile dirt oval		California (San Jose)			1957	Rebuilt in 1990 to a 0.333-mile dirt oval in 1991; facility remains active but track is gone.
Santa Fe Speedway	0.500-mile dirt oval		Illinois (Willow Springs)			1954	Closed in 1995; demolished to make way for subdivision. Only remains truly left are a sign on an old barn roof on I–55.
Sharon Speedway	0.500-mile dirt oval		Ohio (Hartford)			1954	Remains active while track shortened; now owned by Dave Blaney.
Soldier Field	0.500-mile paved oval		Illinois (Chicago)			1956	Several races, sanctioned by NASCAR were held on this race track between 1956 and 1959. However, only one race (held on July 21, 1956) counted towards the championship. Stadium remains active as home to the NFL's Chicago Bears; track was removed in 1970.
Stamford Park	0.500-mile dirt oval		Ontario (Niagara Falls)			1952	Closed during 1953.
Starlite Speedway	0.500-mile dirt oval		North Carolina (Monroe)		Independent 250	1966	Closed after 1973.
Stateline Speedway	0.333-mile dirt oval		New York (Busti)			1958	Remains active.
Shangri-La Speedway (Tioga Speedway)	0.500-mile dirt oval		New York (Owego)			1952	Closed in 2005; track is now the site of a rock quarry. Replaced by Shangri-La II Speedway on former site of Skyline Park.
Titusville-Cocoa Airport	1.600-mile (2.575 km) street course		Florida (Titusville)			1957	Temporary airport course
Tucson Rodeo Grounds	0.500-mile dirt oval		Arizona (Tucson)			1955	Stopped hosting auto races during 1955; facility remains active.
Vernon Fairgrounds	0.500-mile dirt oval		New York (Vernon)			1950	Closed c. 1951; semi-active as a horse track.
Wall Stadium	0.333-mile paved oval		New Jersey (Belmar)			1958	Remains active.
West Capital Raceway	0.500-mile dirt oval		California (Sacramento)			1957	Closed in 1980; former site now marked by a monument.
Williams Grove Speedway	0.500-mile dirt oval		Pennsylvania (Mechanicsburg)			1954	Remains active.
Winchester Speedway	0.500-mile oiled oval		Indiana (Winchester)			1950	Paved in 1951; remains active.

== Other tracks used by NASCAR ==
This table includes tracks used by NASCAR solely for exhibition races, non-points races or other special events that were not part of any regular NASCAR season.

Track	Type and layout	Banking (oval) Direction (non-oval)	Location	Map	Named race(s)	Season(s)	Notes
Calder Park Thunderdome	1.119-mile (1.801 km) paved oval		Calder Park, Victoria, Australia	Calder	Goodyear NASCAR 500 – exhibition	1988	Inactive. Hosted the Australian NASCAR Championship until 2001. Hosted the Australian variant AUSCAR until the series' demise in 1999.
Los Angeles Memorial Coliseum	0.25-mile (0.40 km) paved oval		Los Angeles, California		The Clash – exhibition	2022–2024	Stadium still active; Home of USC Trojans Football.
Pompano Beach Speedway	1.125-mile (1.811 km) dirt oval		Pompano Beach, Florida			1948	Closed c. 2000, was most likely a horse track after racing.
Suzuka International Racing Course (East Circuit)	1.400-mile (2.253 km) road course	Clockwise	Suzuka, Mie, Japan	Suzuka	exhibition	1996–1997	Remains active, hosted Formula One race from 1987 – 2006; returned to Formula One in 2009.
Twin Ring Motegi	1.549-mile (2.493 km) paved oval		Motegi, Tochigi, Japan	Motegi	Coca-Cola 500 – exhibition	1998	Oval closed in 2011, hosted Indy Japan 300 for IndyCar Series from 1998 to 2011. Road Course still open and is used by MotoGP and the Super Formula series.

== See also ==
- Short track motor racing
- List of motor racing venues by capacity
- Tourist attractions in the United States
- Lists of sports venues
- Lists of stadiums
