= 2027 NASCAR Truck Series =

American motorsports season

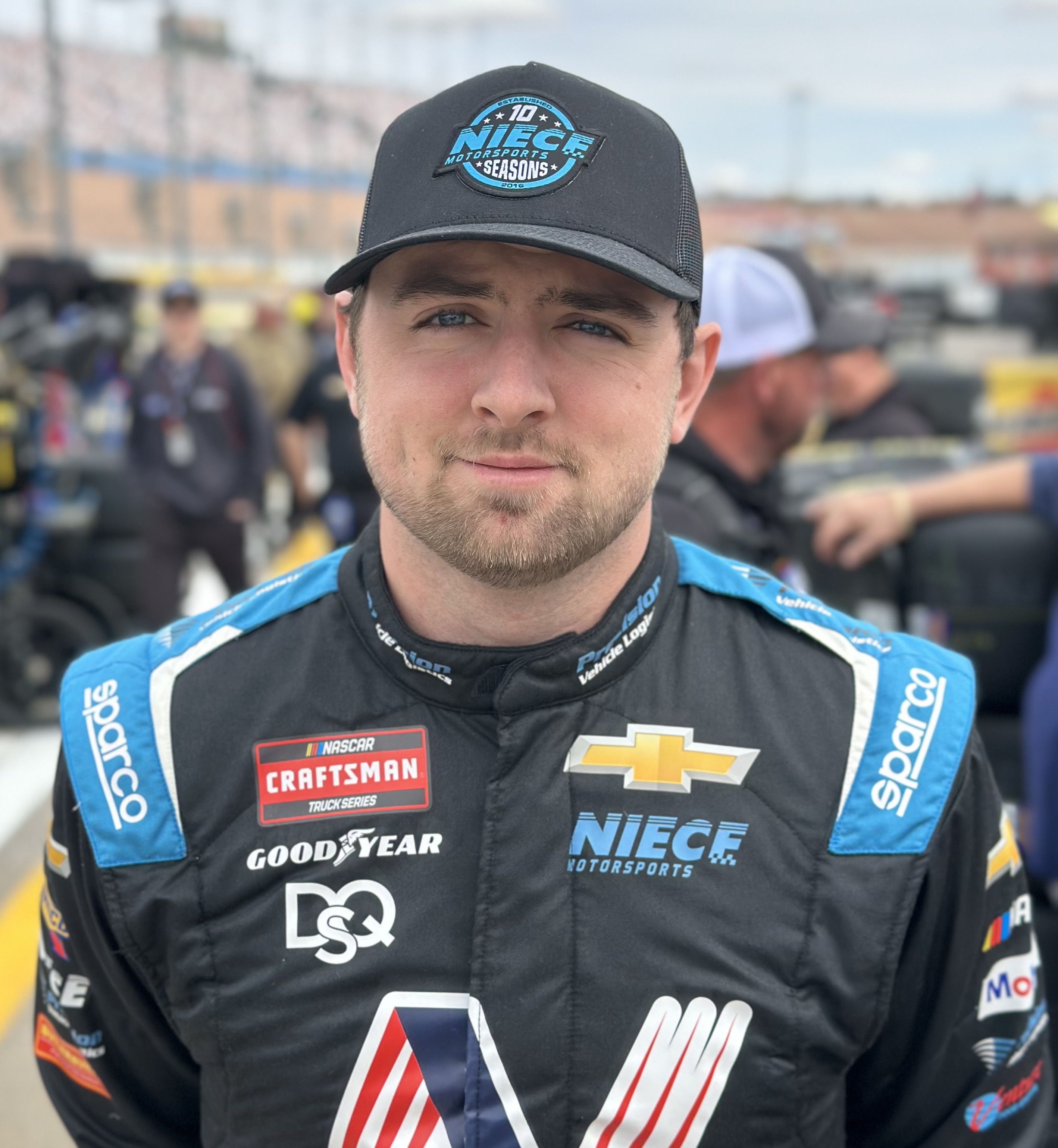
Kaden Honeycutt enters the season as the defending Truck Series champion.

The 2027 NASCAR Truck Series, known as the 2027 NASCAR FedEx Freight Truck Series for sponsorship reasons, will be the 33rd season of the NASCAR Truck Series, a pickup truck racing series sanctioned by NASCAR in the United States. The season will start on February 19 with the Fresh From Florida 250 at Daytona International Speedway, and will end at Homestead–Miami Speedway on November 12.

This will be the first year of FedEx Freight's title sponsorship of the Truck Series. They replaced Craftsman (under parent company Stanley Black & Decker). After the deal for the new title sponsorship was initially reported by Jordan Bianchi from The Athletic in late August 2026, it was officially announced on September 17, 2026.

== Teams and drivers ==
=== Full-time teams ===
Manufacturer	Team	No.	Driver	Crew chief	Notes
Chevrolet	CR7 Motorsports	9	Grant Enfinger	TBA	Enfinger will return to CR7 in 2027.
Chevrolet	McAnally–Hilgemann Racing	18	Nick Sanchez	Dewey Townsend IV	Tyler Ankrum will not return to MHR in 2027. Sanchez, who drove for the now-defunct AM Racing in the NASCAR O'Reilly Auto Parts Series in 2026, will replace Ankrum.
Chevrolet	McAnally–Hilgemann Racing	19	Daniel Hemric	Darren Fraley	Hemric will return to MHR in 2027.
Chevrolet	McAnally–Hilgemann Racing	81	TBA	TBA	Kris Wright will not return to MHR in 2027.
Chevrolet	McAnally–Hilgemann Racing	91	Christian Eckes	Matt Barndt	Eckes will return to MHR in 2027.
Chevrolet	Spire Motorsports	77	Kasey Kahne	TBA	Kahne will drive full-time with Spire.
Ford	Front Row Motorsports	34	Layne Riggs	TBA	Riggs will return to FRM in 2027.
Ford	Front Row Motorsports	38	Jake Garcia	TBA	Chandler Smith will not return to FRM in 2027. He will drive for Richard Childress Racing full-time in the O'Reilly Auto Parts Series. Jake Garcia will move from ThorSport Racing to FRM.
Ford	Team Reaume	2	Timmy Hill	TBA	Hill will move from Hill Motorsports to Team Reaume in 2027.
Ram	Kaulig Racing	14	TBA	TBA	Mini Tyrrell will not return to Kaulig in 2027.
Ram	Kaulig Racing	16	Justin Haley	TBA	Haley is expected to return to Kaulig in 2027.
Toyota	Halmar Friesen Racing	52	Stewart Friesen	Phil Gould	Friesen will return to his own team in 2027.
Toyota	Tricon Garage	5	Dawson Sutton	Seth Smith	Sutton will move from Rackley W.A.R. to Tricon in 2027.
Toyota	Tricon Garage	11	Kaden Honeycutt	Scott Zipadelli	Honeycutt will return to Tricon in 2027.
Toyota	Tricon Garage	15	Sammy Smith	Chad Walter	Smith will join Tricon in 2027. Walter moves from the Spire No. 77 truck to be the crew chief.
Toyota	Tricon Garage	17	Gio Ruggiero	Jeff Stankiewicz	Ruggiero will return to Tricon in 2027.

=== Part-time teams ===
Manufacturer	Team	No.	Driver	Crew chief	Races	Notes
Chevrolet	GK Racing	95	Clay Greenfield	TBA	TBA	Greenfield is expected to return to his own team in 2027.
Chevrolet	McAnally-Hilgemann Racing	TBA	Hailie Deegan	TBA	TBA	Deegan will run select Truck Series races for MHR in 2027.
Chevrolet	Norm Benning Racing	6	Norm Benning	TBA	TBA	Benning is expected to return to his own team in 2027.
Chevrolet	Spire Motorsports	7	Tristan McKee	TBA	TBA	McKee will return to Spire in an expanded Truck Series schedule in 2027.
Ford	City Garage Motorsports	TBA	TBA	TBA	1	Costner Motorsports was taken over by City Garage Motorsports, as Caleb Costner moved to CGM.
Toyota	Greg Van Alst Motorsports	35	Greg Van Alst	TBA	TBA	Van Alst is expected to return to his own team for 2027.
Toyota	TC Motorsports	90	Justin Carroll	TBA	TBA	Carroll is expected to return to his own team for 2027.
Toyota	Tricon Garage	1	TBA	Jerame Donley	TBA	Tricon will field the No. 1 truck again in 2027 with a rotation of drivers, but the team has not stated if the truck will be a full-time or part-time entry.

=== Changes ===
==== Drivers ====
Tyler Ankrum will not return to the McAnally–Hilgemann Racing No. 18 truck. He drove that truck full-time for three years.

Tanner Gray will not return to the Tricon Garage No. 15 truck. He drove that truck full-time for seven years, counting the teams previous iterations of DGR-Crosley and David Gilliland Racing.

==== Teams ====
Rackley W.A.R. closed their Truck Series operations after six years in the series following the 2026 Love's RV Stop 225 at Talladega.

Hill Motorsports closed down following the 2026 Black's Tire 200 at Martinsville.

== Rule changes ==
=== Policy changes ===
==== Superspeedway qualifying ====
Qualifying for superspeedway races at Daytona International Speedway, Atlanta Motor Speedway (EchoPark), and Talladega Superspeedway will feature one round of qualifying rather than two in previous years.

==== Inclement weather policy ====
Should a qualifying session get canceled due to inclement weather, owner's points will be used for deciding the starting lineup. The old "NASCAR Performance Metric" relied heavily on the previous race finish and will not be used for the season opening race.

==== New penalty level ====
The L3 penalty that was in the Cup Series was added both the O'Reilly and Truck Series.

== Schedule ==
The 2027 schedule was fully unveiled on August 26, 2026 and consists of 23 oval races, 2 road course races, and 1 street race.

Notes:

- Race names and title sponsors are subject to change. Not all title sponsors/names of races have been announced for 2027. For the races where a 2027 name and title sponsor has yet to be announced, the title sponsors/names of those races in 2026 are listed.

O Oval track
R Road course
S Street course

No	Race title	Track	Location	Date	TV
1	Fresh From Florida 250	O Daytona International Speedway	Daytona Beach, Florida	February 19	Fox Sports
2	Fr8 208	O EchoPark Speedway	Hampton, Georgia	February 27	Fox Sports
3	OnlyBulls Green Flag 150	S St. Petersburg Street Circuit	St. Petersburg, Florida	March 6	Fox Sports
4	Buckle Up South Carolina 200	O Darlington Raceway	Darlington, South Carolina	April 2	Fox Sports
5	Tennessee Army National Guard 250	O Bristol Motor Speedway	Bristol, Tennessee	April 9	Fox Sports
6	SpeedyCash.com 250	O Texas Motor Speedway	Fort Worth, Texas	April 30	Fox Sports
7	TBA	O Kansas Speedway	Kansas City, Kansas	May 8	Fox Sports
8	FaithFest 250	O North Wilkesboro Speedway	North Wilkesboro, North Carolina	May 21	Fox Sports
9	North Carolina Education Lottery 200	O Charlotte Motor Speedway	Concord, North Carolina	May 28	Fox Sports
10	Allegiance 200	O Nashville Superspeedway	Lebanon, Tennessee	June 4	Fox Sports
11	TBA	O Pocono Raceway	Long Pond, Pennsylvania	June 11	Fox Sports
12	DQS Solutions & Staffing 250	O Michigan International Speedway	Brooklyn, Michigan	June 19	Fox Sports
13	LiUNA! 150	R Lime Rock Park	Lakeville, Connecticut	July 10	Fox Sports
14	TBA	O EchoPark Speedway	Hampton, Georgia	July 17	Fox Sports
15	TSport 200	O Lucas Oil Indianapolis Raceway Park	Brownsburg, Indiana	July 23	Fox Sports
16	UNOH 250	O Bristol Motor Speedway	Bristol, Tennessee	August 12	Fox Sports
17	TBA	O Bowman Gray Stadium	Winston-Salem, North Carolina	August 20	Fox Sports
18	TBA	R Canadian Tire Motorsport Park	Bowmanville, Ontario	September 5	Fox Sports
The Chase
19	Team EJP 175	O New Hampshire Motor Speedway	Loudon, New Hampshire	September 25	Fox Sports
20	RaceToStopSuicide.com 200	O Kansas Speedway	Kansas City, Kansas	October 1	Fox Sports
21	Ecosave 200	O Charlotte Motor Speedway	Concord, North Carolina	October 15	Fox Sports
22	Zero Carbon Bioethanol 150	O Phoenix Raceway	Avondale, Arizona	October 22	Fox Sports
23	Love's RV Stops 225	O Talladega Superspeedway	Lincoln, Alabama	October 29	Fox Sports
24	Black's Tire 200	O Martinsville Speedway	Ridgeway, Virginia	November 5	Fox Sports
25	Craftsman 200	O Homestead–Miami Speedway	Homestead, Florida	November 12	Fox Sports

=== Schedule changes ===
The summer race at EchoPark Speedway was added for the first time since 2008, replacing the NASCAR O'Reilly Auto Parts Series' Focused Health 250. The series will return to Canadian Tire Motorsport Park and Pocono Raceway for the first time since 2019 and 2025, respectively. The series will not return to Richmond Raceway, Rockingham Speedway, Naval Base Coronado, and Watkins Glen International for the first time since 2019, 2024, and 2025, respectively. The second race at Kansas Speedway will return to the schedule for the first time since 2024. The series will race at Bowman Gray Stadium for the first time.

== See also ==
- 2027 NASCAR Cup Series
- 2027 NASCAR O'Reilly Auto Parts Series
- 2027 ARCA Menards Series
- 2027 ARCA Menards Series East
- 2027 ARCA Menards Series West
- 2027 NASCAR Whelen Modified Tour
