= Chevrolet Silverado 250 =

The Chevrolet Silverado 250 may refer to:

- NASCAR Truck Series at Canadian Tire Motorsport Park, from 2013 to 2019
- NASCAR Craftsman Truck Series at Talladega Superspeedway, in 2021
