= Scott Zipadelli =

American NASCAR crew chief (born 1969)

Personal information
- Born: Scott Zipadelli; October 29, 1969 (age 57) Newington, Connecticut, U.S.

Sport
- Country: United States
- Sport: NASCAR Truck Series
- Team: 11. Tricon Garage

Scott Zipadelli (born October 29, 1969) is an American NASCAR crew chief who works for Tricon Garage as the crew chief of their No. 11 Toyota Tundra TRD Pro in the NASCAR O'Reilly Auto Parts Series driven by Kaden Honeycutt. He has won 41 Truck Series races and 3 championships as a crew chief.

Zipadelli started his crew chiefing career in 2000 in the O'Reilly Auto Parts Series when it was known as the NASCAR Busch Series for Ward Burton at Innovative Motorsports. In 2010, he earned his first win as a crew chief for Boris Said in the Busch Series. In 2015, he shifted over to the Truck Series beginning with Red Horse Racing. He worked as a crew chief in that series for Hattori Racing Enterprises from 2017–2022, including winning a championship with Brett Moffitt in 2018. In 2023, he moved to Tricon Garage, winning back to back championships with Corey Heim and Kaden Honeycutt respectively.

== Racing career ==
Zipadelli got his start as a Cup level crew chief in 2000 as he was hired by George Debidart for his team Innovative Motorsports. He got his first start as a crew chief that year as he worked in the Busch Series with Ward Burton; where he finished fifth. Then he was paired up with Mike McLaughlin for 13 events. They managed one top-five finish.

Zipadelli would not perform as a NASCAR crew chief again until 2007. He was hired by Tad Geschicter who split a ride between Jon Wood and Kelly Bires. Wood would have a best finish of tenth while Bires would post a seventh and ninth place result. 2008 saw Bires race full-time, and the pair would finish a season best fifth place finish, with six top-tens.

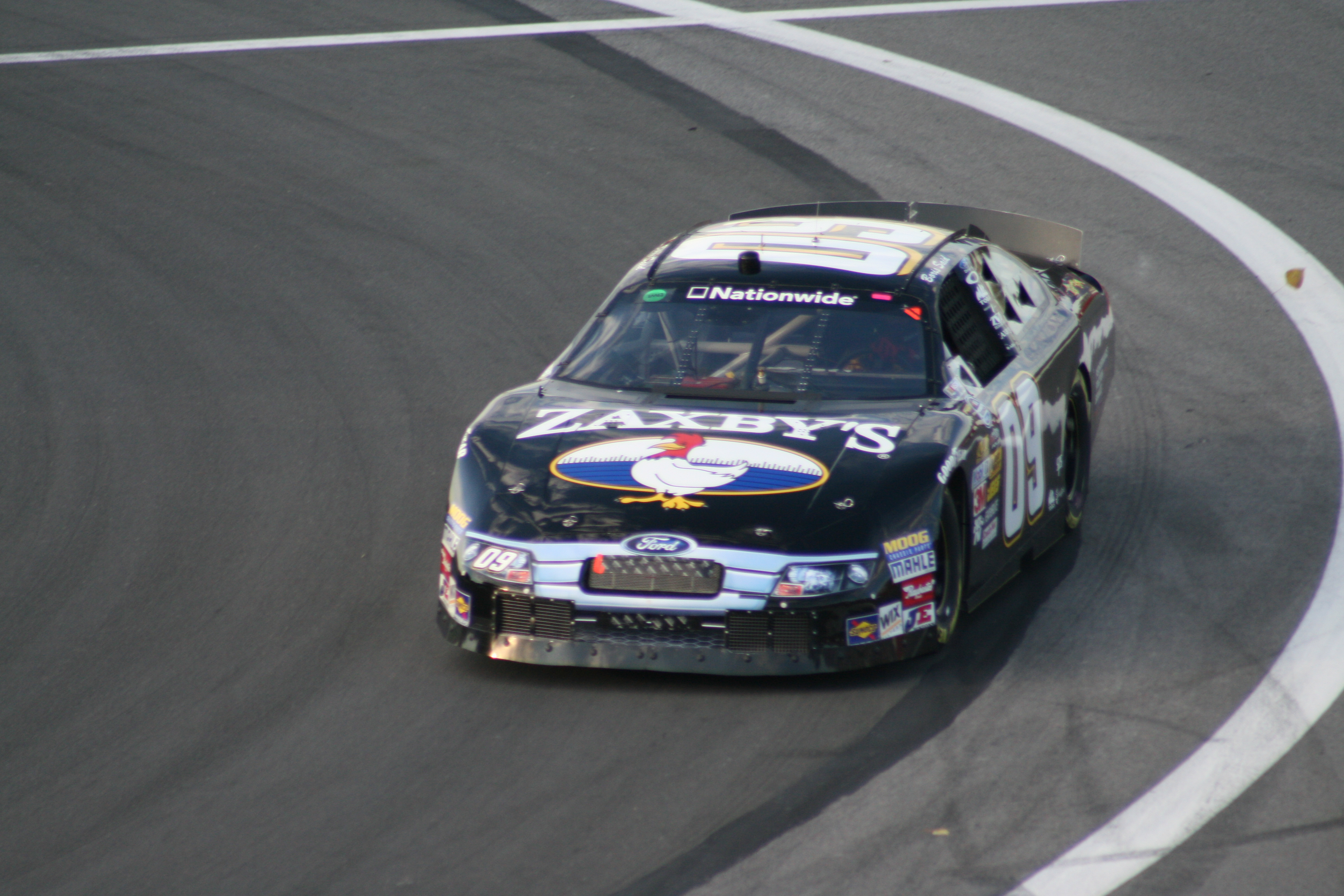
Said's car in which he won at Montreal in 2010.

Zipadelli was hired by Todd Braun to be the head wrench for Jason Leffler. They would have eight top-five finishes; two of them being second place finishes, ending up fourth in the points. In 2010, he split time between drivers Leffler, Boris Said and Brian Scott. Said would claim a win at Montreal. The following season Zipadelli went to work for Robby Benton and his driver Kenny Wallace. Benton split driving duties among eight drivers that season with Zipadelli being the crew chief.

In 2013, Zipadelli was hired to work for Steve Turner and driver Justin Allgaier. Although they did not win any races; they did have six top-five finishes and finish fifth in the points. The following season Turner hired Kyle Larson to drive the car, with Zipadelli remaining as the crew chief. Larson won twice in 28 starts, including his first at Auto Club Speedway. In 2015, team owner Tom Deloach of Red Horse Racing hired Zipadelli to team up with driver Ben Kennedy. As Deloache's funds dwindled; he split the driving duties of one of his race teams among five different drivers, one being Brett Moffitt, who won at Michigan in one of his six starts.

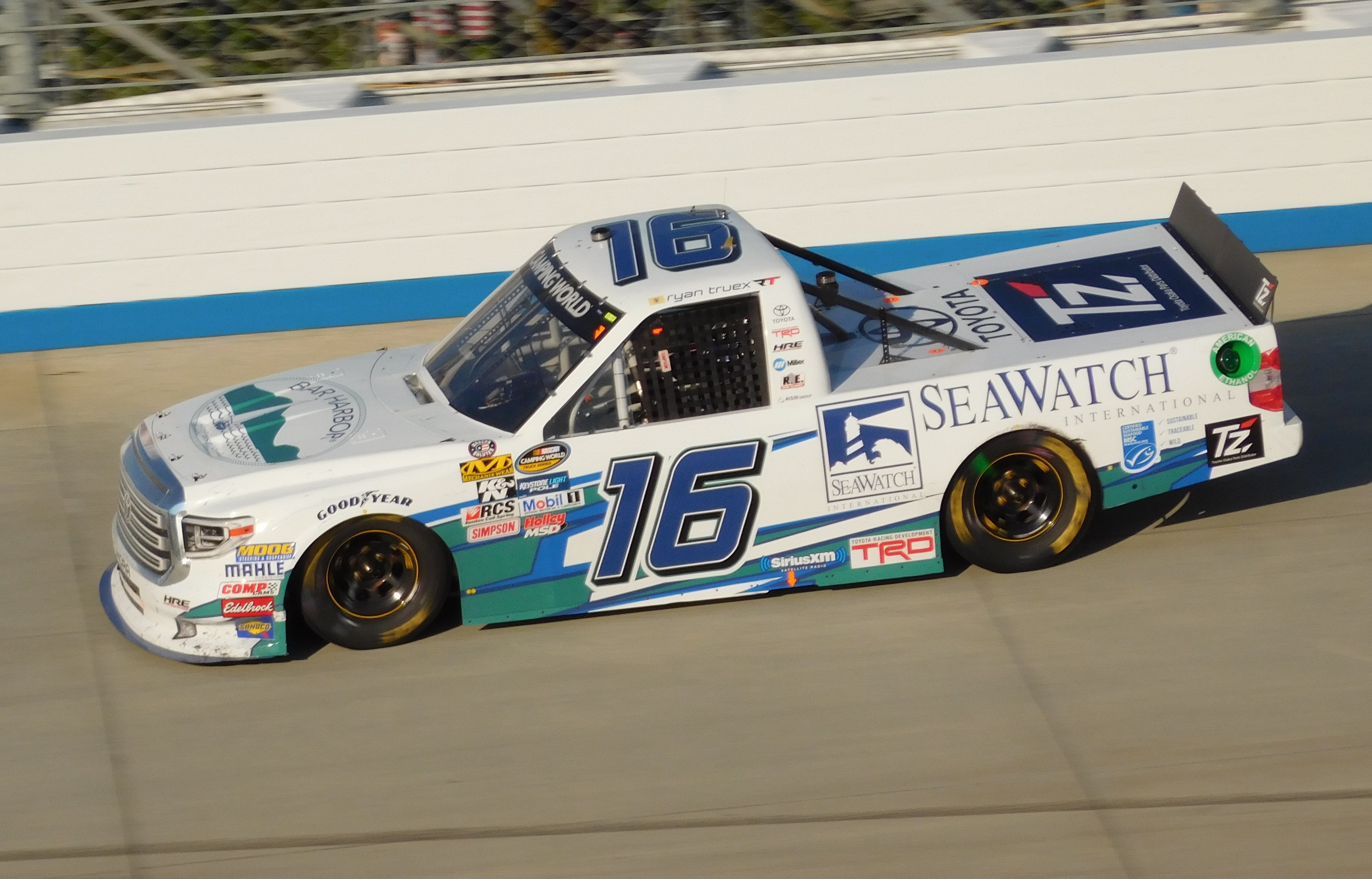
Truex's 2017 truck at Dover

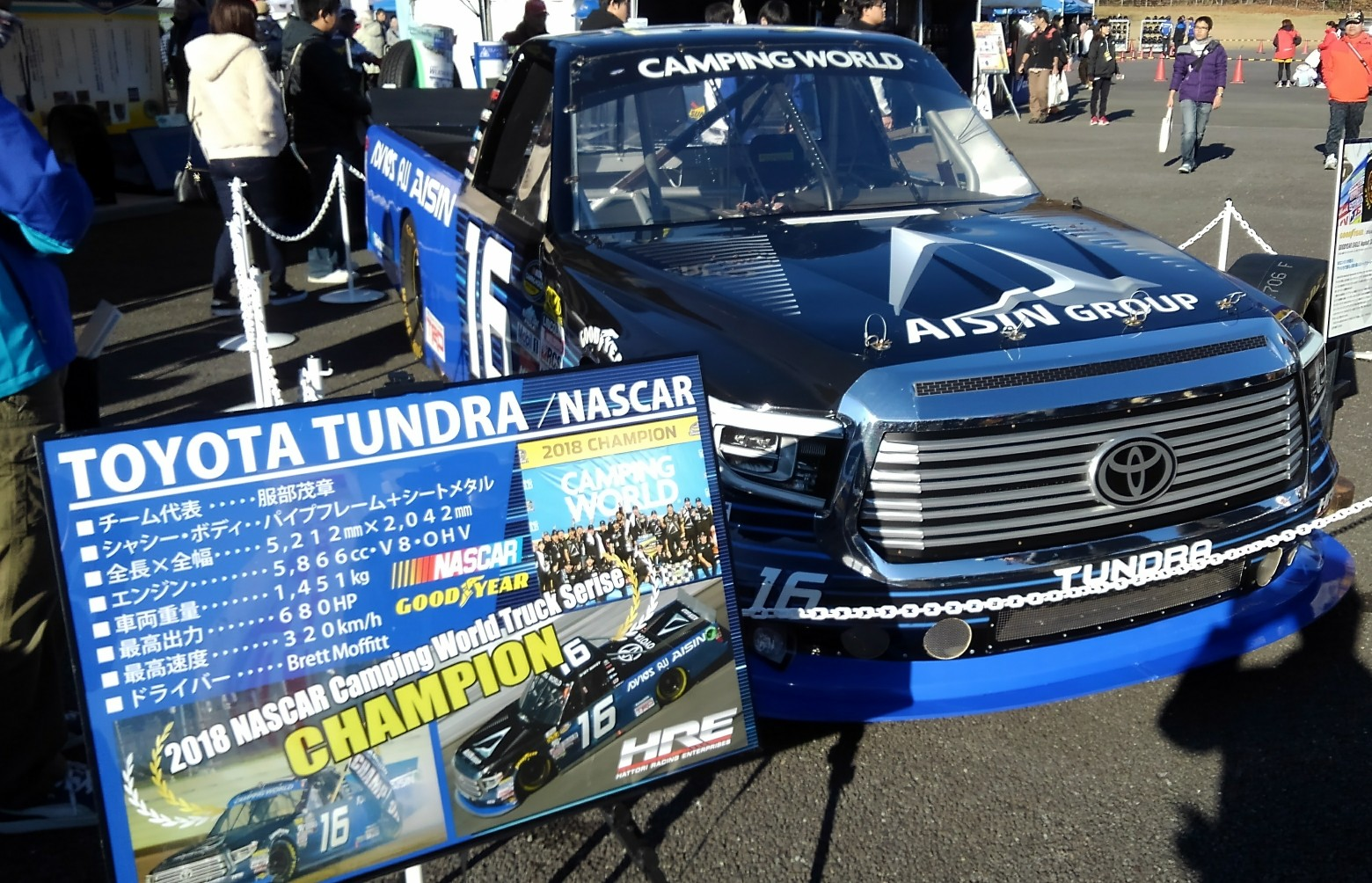
Brett Moffitt's championship-winning truck on display in 2018

Due to Deloache's lack of funding, he scaled back the size of his race team; and Zipadelli went to work for Hattori Racing Enterprises and driver Ryan Truex beginning in 2016. They posted eight top-five and 13 top-ten finishes, ninth in points. The duo paired again in 2017, where they finished ninth in points. For 2018, Moffitt was hired by Hattori to drive his truck full-time. Moffitt won the second race of the year at Atlanta. He had three more wins before the season was halfway over; and kept up that pace scoring three more before the seasons end. Moffitt made it through every round of the playoffs and was in contention to win the championship. Moffitt led the final 29 laps to win the championship, the first championship for Zipadelli and Hattori.

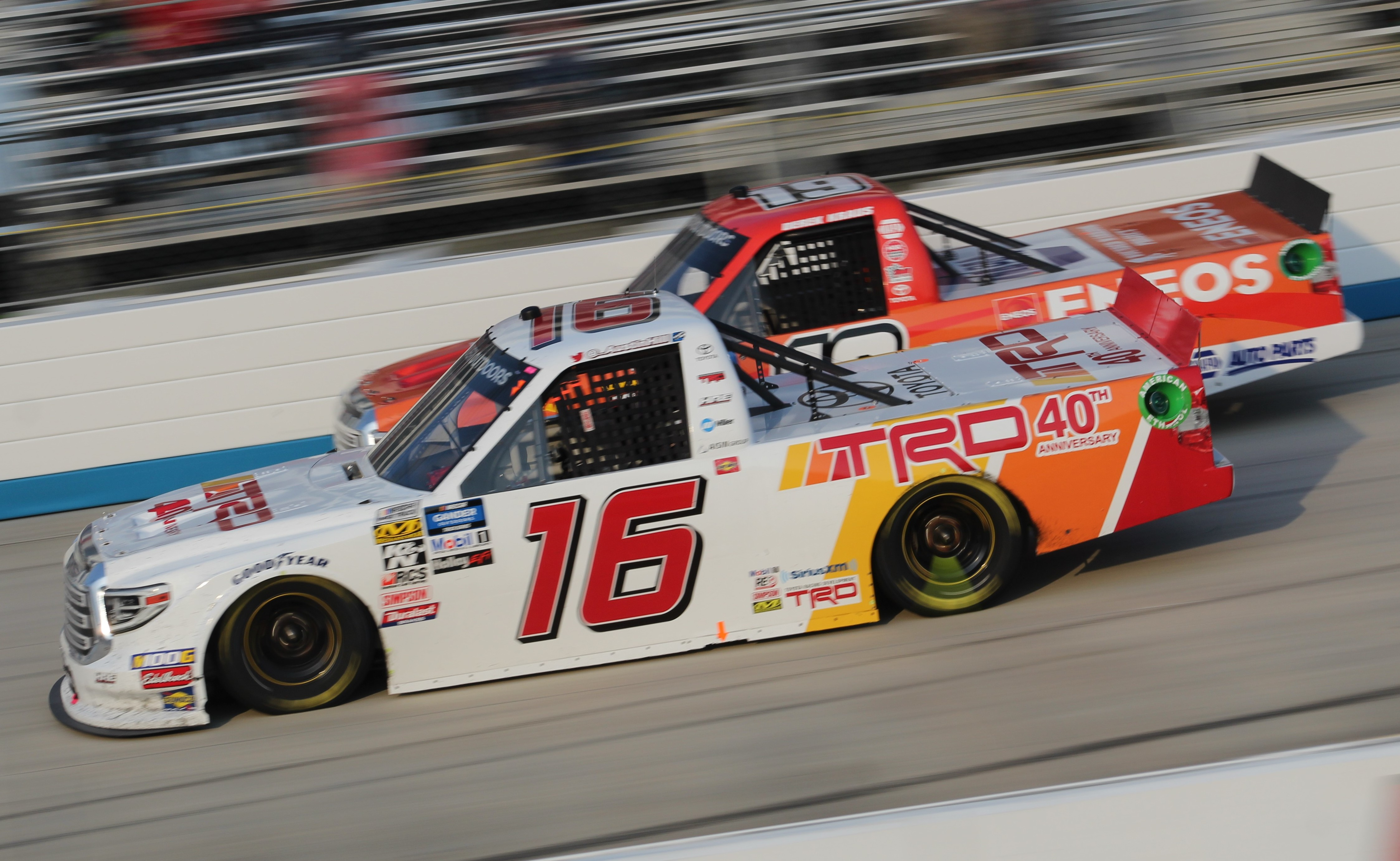
Hill racing Derek Kraus in the 2019 JEGS 200

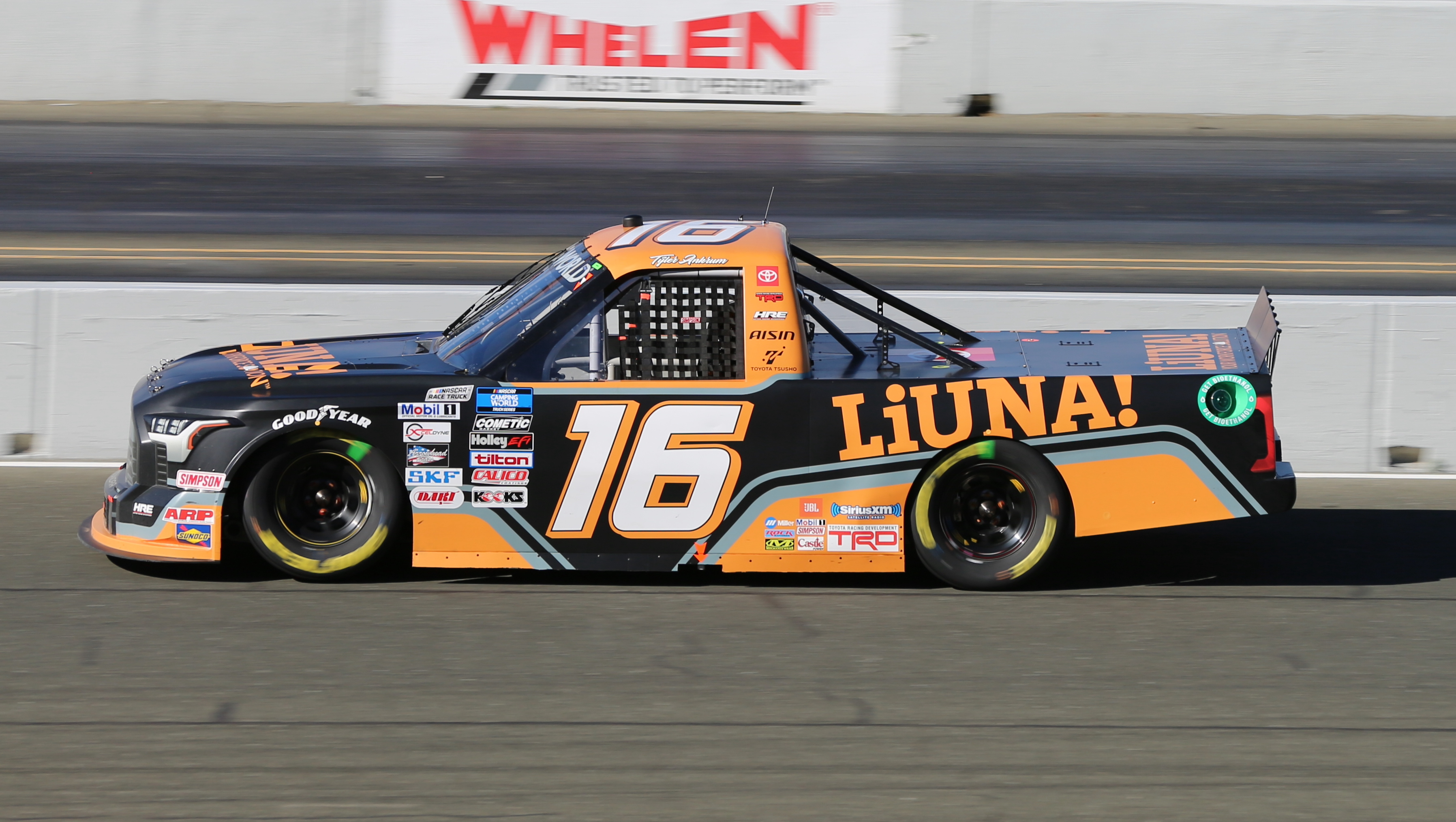
Ankrum's No. 16 truck at Sonoma Raceway in 2022

In 2019, Austin Hill was hired to drive for Hattori and was paired with Zipadelli. The pair kicked off the season with a win at Daytona. They would win again at Michigan and Las Vegas. He ran well in the playoffs but in the final race of the Round of 8, Hill crashed and would be eliminated from playoff contention. Hill won the final race at Homestead and finished fifth in the points. Zipadelli and Hill returned for 2020. Hill got two wins in that year for the playoffs and added two more in 2021. Both seasons Hill had a good shot to win the championship, but problems in the playoffs kept him from advancing to the final race. For 2022, Tyler Ankrum took over Hill's ride with Zipadelli remaining as crew chief. Overheating sidelined them at Texas. They would finish 12th in season points.

In 2023, Zipadelli was paired with Corey Heim, racing for Tricon Garage. Heim scored his first win of the season at Martinsville. He was forced to miss Gateway due to an illness; Jesse Love substituted for him and finished ninth in the race. Despite missing one race, Heim maintained the points lead and scored his second win at Mid-Ohio. At the conclusion of the Richmond race, Heim claimed the regular season championship. During the playoffs, Heim won at Bristol. Heim finished third at Homestead to make the Championship 4.

Zipadelli was paired with Heim again for the 2024 season. Throughout the regular season, he scored wins at COTA, Kansas, North Wilkesboro, Gateway, and Pocono. During the playoffs, Heim won at Kansas. He finished second in the final points standings.

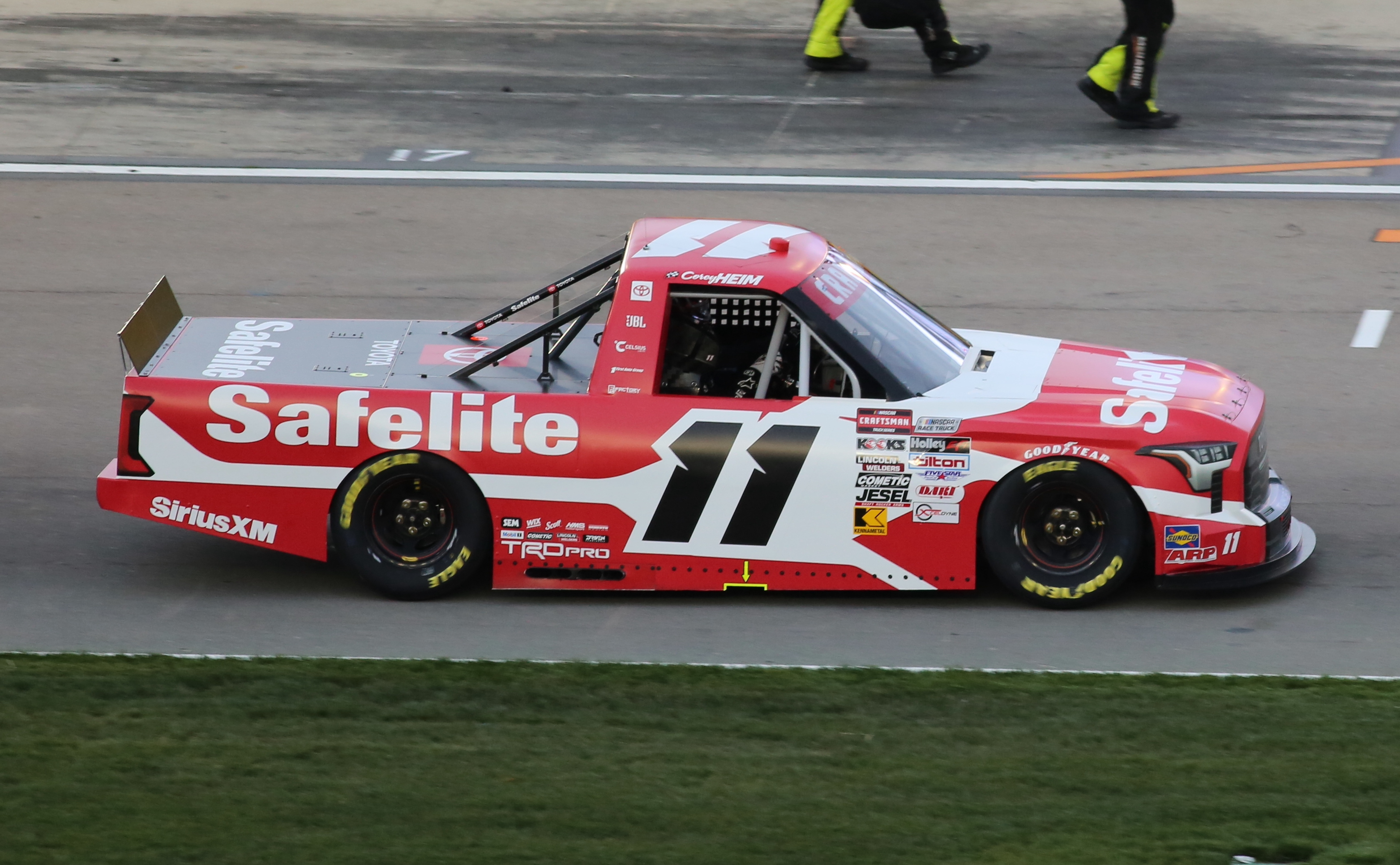
Heim's No. 11 truck at Las Vegas Motor Speedway in 2025

Heim started the 2025 season with another second-place finish at Daytona; however, the initial race winner, Parker Kligerman, failed post-race inspection after it was found that his truck was too low. Kligerman was disqualified, and Heim would be awarded the win. In the regular-season, he also scored wins at Las Vegas, Texas, Charlotte, Lime Rock, Watkins Glen, and Richmond. During the playoffs, he won at Darlington, New Hampshire, and the Charlotte Roval; the latter earning him a record ten wins in a season, beating Greg Biffle's previous record of nine wins in 1999. He scored his eleventh win of the season at Martinsville to make the Championship 4. Heim and Zipadelli concluded the season with a win at Phoenix to claim the Truck Series championship.

On December 5, 2025, it was announced that Kaden Honeycutt and Zipadelli would be paired up in the No. 11 truck in 2026 season. Zipadelli would be side-lined the first three events due to injury. With Zipadelli back on the box, Honeycutt scored his first career Truck Series victories at Watkins Glen and Richmond. In "The Chase", Honeycutt won at Kansas and Phoenix. He then won the season ending race at Homestead to win his first Truck Series championship and Zipadelli's second-straight.

== Personal life ==
Zipadelli's brother Greg was a crew chief, who helped Tony Stewart win two NASCAR Cup Series championships.
