= NASCAR Truck Series at Bowman Gray Stadium =

NASCAR Truck Series race from 2027

TBA

NASCAR Truck Series
- Venue: Bowman Gray Stadium
- Location: Winston-Salem, North Carolina
- First race: 2027

Circuit information
- Surface: Asphalt
- Length: 0.25 mi (0.40 km)
- Turns: 4

Pickup truck races in the NASCAR Truck Series will be held at Bowman Gray Stadium in North Carolina from 2027.

== History ==
On August 22, 2026, the Winston-Salem Journal and The Athletic reported that a race would be held at Bowman Gray Stadium in 2027. The race was confirmed that same day.

== Past winners ==
Year	Date	No.	Driver	Team	Manufacturer	Race distance		Race time	Average speed (mph)	Report	Ref
Year	Date	No.	Driver	Team	Manufacturer	Laps	Miles (km)	Race time	Average speed (mph)	Report	Ref
2027	August 20									Report	

Previous race: UNOH 250	NASCAR Truck Series; TBA	Next race: TBA
