= NASCAR Truck Series at Pocono Raceway =

NASCAR Truck Series race at Pocono Raceway

TBA

NASCAR Truck Series
- Venue: Pocono Raceway
- Location: Long Pond, Pennsylvania, United States
- First race: 2010
- Previous names: Pocono Mountains 125 (2010, 2012–2013); Good Sam RV Emergency Road Service 125 (2011); Pocono Mountains 150 (2014–2016); Overton's 150 (2017); Gander Outdoors 150 (2018); Gander RV 150 (2019); Pocono Organics 150 (2020); CRC Brakleen 150 (2021–2023); CRC Brakleen 175 (2024); MillerTech Battery 200 (2025)
- Most wins (driver): Kyle Busch (3)
- Most wins (team): Kyle Busch Motorsports (8)
- Most wins (manufacturer): Toyota (8)

Circuit information
- Surface: Asphalt
- Length: 2.5 mi (4.0 km)
- Turns: 3

The NASCAR Truck Series at Pocono Raceway is a 200-mile-long (321.869 km) annual race on the NASCAR Truck Series schedule at the Pocono Raceway.

Layne Riggs is the defending race winner.

== History ==
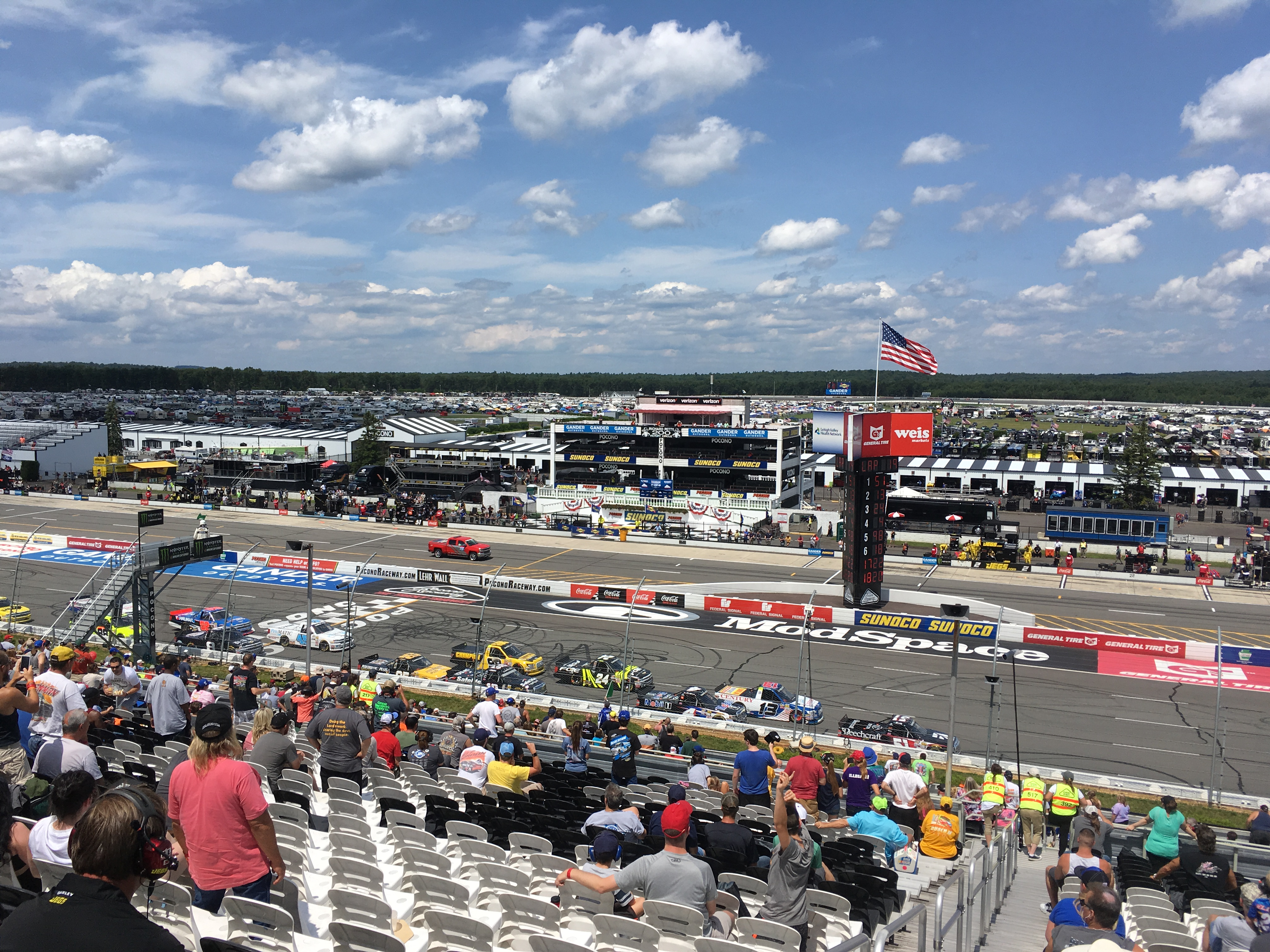
The 2018 race

The inaugural race was run on July 31, 2010. The race was most notable for its qualifying procedure, with more than two cars running at the same time on the track. The inaugural winner was Elliott Sadler who became the 21st NASCAR driver to win in all three series.

The race was 125 miles (201.168 km) in length from 2010 to 2013; in 2014 it was extended to 150 miles (241.402 km). The event marked the first time that the Truck Series raced in the state of Pennsylvania since 2001 at the now defunct Nazareth Speedway, and the first time that two of the three major NASCAR divisions now raced at Pocono since from 1974 to 2009 it was only the Cup Series that raced there.

In early 2019, NASCAR announced significant changes to the 2020 schedules for all three divisions at Pocono, with the NASCAR Cup Series running a doubleheader on Saturday and Sunday. The Truck race, which remained at 150 miles in length, was run on Saturday. However, due to rain, the event was postponed to Sunday morning.

On March 8, 2024, it was announced that the race would be lengthened from 150 to 175 miles starting in 2024. In December 2024, Pocono Raceway's website announced that the race would be extended further to 200 miles. MillerTech Battery was named the entitlement sponsor on May 1, 2025. In 2026, the race was removed from the schedule in favor of the ARCA Menards Series event. On August 18, 2026, it was announced that the race would return on the 2027 schedule with the ARCA Menards Series race not returning.

== Past winners ==
Year	Date	No.	Driver	Team	Manufacturer	Race Distance		Race Time	Average Speed (mph)	Report	Ref
Year	Date	No.	Driver	Team	Manufacturer	Laps	Miles (km)	Race Time	Average Speed (mph)	Report	Ref
2010	July 31	2	Elliott Sadler	Kevin Harvick Inc.	Chevrolet	55*	137.5 (221.284)	1:13:41	111.966	Report	
2011	August 6/7*	2	Kevin Harvick	Kevin Harvick Inc.	Chevrolet	53*	132.5 (213.238)	1:19:50	99.582	Report	
2012	August 4	22	Joey Coulter	Richard Childress Racing	Chevrolet	50	125 (201.168)	1:01:43	121.523	Report	
2013	August 3	29	Ryan Blaney	Brad Keselowski Racing	Ford	54*	135 (217.261)	1:03:08	128.3	Report	
2014	August 2	3	Austin Dillon	Richard Childress Racing	Chevrolet	64*	160 (257.495)	1:19:06	121.365	Report	
2015	August 1	51	Kyle Busch	Kyle Busch Motorsports	Toyota	69*	172.5 (277.611)	1:26:32	119.607	Report	
2016	July 30	9	William Byron	Kyle Busch Motorsports	Toyota	60	150 (241.402)	1:30:45	99.174	Report	
2017	July 29	4	Christopher Bell	Kyle Busch Motorsports	Toyota	60	150 (241.402)	1:14:01	121.594	Report	
2018	July 28	51	Kyle Busch	Kyle Busch Motorsports	Toyota	60	150 (241.402)	1:05:47	136.813	Report	
2019	July 27	45	Ross Chastain	Niece Motorsports	Chevrolet	60	150 (241.402)	1:12:27	124.224	Report	
2020	June 28*	51	Brandon Jones	Kyle Busch Motorsports	Toyota	60	150 (241.402)	1:35:40	94.077	Report	
2021	June 26	4	John Hunter Nemechek	Kyle Busch Motorsports	Toyota	60	150 (241.402)	1:13:35	122.31	Report	
2022	July 23	18	Chandler Smith	Kyle Busch Motorsports	Toyota	60	150 (241.402)	1:20:39	111.593	Report	
2023	July 22	51	Kyle Busch	Kyle Busch Motorsports	Chevrolet	60	150 (241.402)	1:23:00	108.434	Report	
2024	July 12	11	Corey Heim	Tricon Garage	Toyota	70	175 (281.635)	1:32:42	113.269	Report	
2025	June 20	34	Layne Riggs	Front Row Motorsports	Ford	80	200 (321.869)	1:43:18	116.167	Report	
2026	Not held										
2027	June 11									Report	

=== Notes ===
- 2010–11 and 2013–15: The race was extended due to a NASCAR Overtime finish. 2010 and 2013 took 2 attempts at overtime.
- 2011: Race stopped after 17 laps on August 6 due to rain, race completed on August 7.
- 2020: Race postponed from June 27 to June 28 due to rain.

=== Multiple winners (drivers) ===
# Wins	Driver	Years won
3	Kyle Busch	2015, 2018, 2023

=== Multiple winners (teams) ===
# Wins	Team	Years won
8	Kyle Busch Motorsports	2015–2018, 2020–2023
2	Kevin Harvick Inc.	2010, 2011
2	Richard Childress Racing	2012, 2014

=== Manufacturer wins ===
# Wins	Make	Years won
8	(Japan) Toyota	2015–2018, 2020–2022, 2024
6	(United States) Chevrolet	2010–2012, 2014, 2019, 2023
2	(United States) Ford	2013, 2025

Previous race: Allegiance 200	NASCAR Truck Series; TBA	Next race: DQS Solutions & Staffing 250
