= NASCAR Truck Series at Canadian Tire Motorsport Park =

NASCAR Truck Series at MoSport

TBA

NASCAR Truck Series
- Venue: Canadian Tire Motorsport Park
- Location: Bowmanville, Ontario, Canada
- First race: 2013
- Distance: 152.458 miles (245.357 km)
- Laps: 62; Stage 1/2: 20; Final stage: 24
- Previous names: Chevrolet Silverado 250 (2013–2019)
- Most wins (team): Brad Keselowski Racing; GMS Racing (2)
- Most wins (manufacturer): Chevrolet (4)

Circuit information
- Surface: Asphalt
- Length: 2.459 mi (3.957 km)
- Turns: 10

The NASCAR Truck Series at Canadian Tire Motorsport Park is a NASCAR Truck Series race held at Canadian Tire Motorsport Park, in Bowmanville, Ontario. It was first held in 2013, and served as the second round of the Truck Series playoffs from their introduction in 2016.

== History ==
The first race held on a road course by the Camping World Truck Series in 13 years, it was announced that the race would be held starting in 2013, on Labor Day weekend, in November 2012, replacing the previous NASCAR Nationwide Series race at Circuit Gilles Villeneuve as NASCAR's annual event held in Canada. In April 2013, it was announced that the race would be sponsored by General Motors Canada, becoming the Chevrolet Silverado 250.

The inaugural event, run September 1, 2013, saw James Buescher win the pole at a speed of 109.189 miles per hour (175.723 km/h); Ty Dillon led the most laps in the race before contact between him and Chase Elliott at White's Corner coming to the checkered flag sent Dillon into a tire barrier. Dillon promised that "next week he won't finish the race" but he didn't pursue any payback eventually. In 2014, Ryan Blaney battled Germán Quiroga and won in a photo finish. In 2016, John Hunter Nemechek and Cole Custer were battling for the lead when Nemechek bumped Custer before running both Custer and himself off-road, pinning Custer to the wall. Before the winner was declared, Nemechek was tackled by Custer; Nemechek would be named the winner.

Starting in 2018, the race became a playoff race and was held as the opener of the playoffs, and the event had yet another last-lap showdown as Noah Gragson and teammate Todd Gilliland wrecked in White's Corner, which let Justin Haley past to take the win. In 2019, it became the second race of the first round of the playoffs.

The 2020 and 2021 races were canceled due to the COVID-19 pandemic and replaced by dates at Darlington Raceway.

On August 19, 2026, it was announced that the series would return to Mosport in 2027 for the first time since 2019.

== Past winners ==
Year	Date	No.	Driver	Team	Manufacturer	Race Distance		Race Time	Average Speed (mph)	Report	Ref
Year	Date	No.	Driver	Team	Manufacturer	Laps	Miles (km)	Race Time	Average Speed (mph)	Report	Ref
2013	September 1	94	Chase Elliott	Hendrick Motorsports	Chevrolet	64	157.376 (253.272)	1:48:49	86.775	Report	
2014	August 31	29	Ryan Blaney	Brad Keselowski Racing	Ford	64	157.376 (253.272)	1:42:04	92.514	Report	
2015	August 30	4	Erik Jones	Kyle Busch Motorsports	Toyota	64	157.376 (253.272)	1:53:07	83.476	Report	
2016	September 4	8	John Hunter Nemechek	NEMCO Motorsports	Chevrolet	66*	162.294 (261.186)	2:06:01	77.273	Report	
2017	September 3	19	Austin Cindric	Brad Keselowski Racing	Ford	64	157.376 (253.272)	1:54:53	82.193	Report	
2018	August 26	24	Justin Haley	GMS Racing	Chevrolet	65*	162.5 (261.518)	2:05:24	76.476	Report	
2019	August 25	24	Brett Moffitt	GMS Racing	Chevrolet	64	157.376 (253.272)	1:46:12	88.913	Report	
2020*	August 8	Races canceled due to COVID-19 restrictions in Canada.									
2021*	September 5	Races canceled due to COVID-19 restrictions in Canada.									
2022 – 2026	Not held										
2027	September 5									Report	

- 2016 & 2018: Race extended due to a NASCAR overtime Finish
- 2020 & 2021: Races canceled and moved to Darlington due to the COVID-19 pandemic.

=== Multiple winners (teams) ===
# Wins	Team	Years won
2	Brad Keselowski Racing	2014, 2017
2	GMS Racing	2018, 2019

=== Manufacturer wins ===
# Wins	Make	Years won
4	(United States) Chevrolet	2013, 2016, 2018, 2019
2	(United States) Ford	2014, 2017
1	(Japan) Toyota	2015

Previous race: TBA	NASCAR FedEx Freight Truck Series; TBA	Next race: Team EJP 175
