= NASCAR Truck Series at Bristol Motor Speedway =

NASCAR Craftsman Truck Series races held at Bristol

NASCAR FedEx Freight Truck Series at Bristol Motor Speedway

NASCAR Truck Series
- Venue: Bristol Motor Speedway
- Location: Bristol, Tennessee, United States

Circuit information
- Surface: Concrete
- Length: 0.533 mi (0.858 km)
- Turns: 4

Pickup Truck Racing events in the NASCAR Truck Series have been held at Bristol Motor Speedway, in Bristol, Tennessee during numerous seasons and times of year since 1995.

== Spring race ==
Tennessee Army National Guard 250
- Corporate sponsor: Tennessee Army National Guard
- First race: 2021
- Distance: 133.25 miles (214.45 km)
- Laps: 250; Stage 1: 65; Stage 2: 65; Final stage: 120
- Previous names: Pinty's Truck Race on Dirt (2021–2022); Weather Guard Truck Race on Dirt (2023); Weather Guard Truck Race (2024–2025)
- Most wins (team): ThorSport Racing (2022 & 2023)
- Most wins (manufacturer): Toyota (3)

The Tennessee Army National Guard 250 is a NASCAR Truck Series race at Bristol Motor Speedway. The race is held on the same weekend as the NASCAR Cup Series' Food City 500.

=== History ===
In 2013, the Truck Series raced at Eldora Speedway in NASCAR's first dirt track race since 1970. Known as the Eldora Dirt Derby, the event ran from 2013 to 2019; it was canceled in 2020 due to the COVID-19 pandemic and was then removed from the 2021 schedule.

Bristol Motor Speedway, a half-mile concrete short track, had its surface covered by clay when it hosted the World of Outlaws dirt late model and sprint car tours in 2000 and 2001. Although successful with over 85,000 in average attendance, the race was canceled after its second year due to logistical difficulties: 14,000 truckloads of materials were needed to convert the track to dirt regulations, which resulted in damage to the streets outside, with 8,000 cubic feet of red clay being hauled in from a nearby farm for the surface. The track also had to be widened from 12 to 14 feet and the banking was reduced from 36 to 23 degrees.

On September 30, 2020, NASCAR officially revealed the 2021 Cup Series schedule, which featured a spring dirt race at Bristol that replaced the existing event on Bristol's normal concrete surface. The Truck Series followed suit in its schedule release on November 19, with the Pinty's Dirt Truck Race being one of two dirt events on the series calendar alongside a July round at Knoxville Raceway in Iowa. The event would run alongside the Cup Series dirt race; World of Outlaws events would also take place on the temporary dirt surface, which began to be laid down in early January 2021.

The 2021 race was originally scheduled for Saturday, March 27 with four heat races to determine the starting grid, but rain forced it to be pushed to Sunday. Rain had been in the forecast entering the weekend, prompting NASCAR to delay the heats on Saturday to deploy "packers"—vehicles like Ford Crown Victorias to pack the dirt together—and late models to test the surface's viability before starting the first heat; it only completed one lap before being halted due to mud accumulating on the trucks' windshields and grilles. Further rain and flash flooding on Sunday resulted in a second postponement to Monday.

On February 13, 2023, it was announced that Weather Guard would become the title sponsor of the Truck Series Bristol dirt race in 2023, replacing Pinty's. Weather Guard would continue to sponsor the race when it returned to the concrete in 2024. The name of the race stayed the same with the "on Dirt" piece being dropped.

On December 2, 2025, it was announced that the Tennessee Army National Guard would be the new title sponsor of the race starting in 2026.

=== Past winners ===
Year	Date	No.	Driver	Team	Manufacturer	Race Distance		Race Time	Average Speed (mph)	Report	Ref
Year	Date	No.	Driver	Team	Manufacturer	Laps	Miles (km)	Race Time	Average Speed (mph)	Report	Ref
Dirt Surface
2021	March 29*	51	Martin Truex Jr.	Kyle Busch Motorsports	Toyota	150	79.95 (128.67)	1:49:30	41.096	Report	
2022	April 16	99	Ben Rhodes	ThorSport Racing	Toyota	150	79.95 (128.67)	1:37:55	45.957	Report	
2023	April 8	66	Joey Logano	ThorSport Racing	Ford	150	79.95 (128.67)	1:54:30	39.301	Report	
Concrete Surface
2024	March 16	19	Christian Eckes	McAnally–Hilgemann Racing	Chevrolet	250	133.25 (214.45)	1:39:55	80.017	Report	
2025	April 11	38	Chandler Smith	Front Row Motorsports	Ford	250	133.25 (214.45)	1:50:33	72.32	Report	
2026	April 10	62	Christopher Bell	Halmar Friesen Racing	Toyota	250	133.25 (214.45)	1:59:58	66.644	Report	
2027	April 9									Report	

- 2021: Race postponed from Saturday to Monday due to rain.

==== Multiple winners (teams) ====
# Wins	Team	Years won
2	ThorSport Racing	2022, 2023

==== Manufacturer wins ====
# Wins	Make	Years won
3	(Japan) Toyota	2021, 2022, 2026
2	(United States) Ford	2023, 2025
1	(United States) Chevrolet	2024

== Summer race ==
UNOH 250
- Corporate sponsor: University of Northwestern Ohio
- First race: 1995
- Distance: 133.25 miles (214.445 km)
- Laps: 250; Stages 1/2: 65 each Final stage: 120
- Previous names: Pizza Plus 150 (1995); Coca-Cola 200 (1996); Loadhandler 200 (1997–1998); Coca-Cola Family 200 (1999); O'Reilly 200 presented by Valvoline Maxlife (2003–2005); O'Reilly Auto Parts 200 (2006); O'Reilly 200 (2007–2008); O'Reilly 200 presented by Valvoline (2009–2011); UNOH 200 (2012–2024)
- Most wins (driver): Kyle Busch (5)
- Most wins (team): GMS Racing; Kyle Busch Motorsports (4)
- Most wins (manufacturer): Toyota (11)

The UNOH 250 is a NASCAR Truck Series race that takes place in the summer at Bristol Motor Speedway in Bristol, Tennessee.

=== History ===
The race was usually held on the Wednesday night prior to the Bass Pro Shops Night Race; though in 2018, the race took place on Thursday night and was broadcast in primetime on Fox. First held in 1995, the race was 150 laps. It was increased to 200 laps the following year, and has remained at that distance since until 2025, when it was increased to 250 laps. There were no Truck races held at BMS between 2000 and 2002. Starting in 2020, it became the first race of the playoffs.

=== Past winners ===
Year	Date	No.	Driver	Team	Manufacturer	Race Distance		Race Time	Average Speed (mph)	Report	Ref
Year	Date	No.	Driver	Team	Manufacturer	Laps	Miles (km)	Race Time	Average Speed (mph)	Report	Ref
1995	June 23	84	Joe Ruttman	Irvan-Simo Racing	Ford	150	79.95 (128.667)	1:06:15	72.408	Report	
1996	June 22	6	Rick Carelli	Chesrown Racing	Chevrolet	200	106.6 (171.556)	1:16:09	83.992	Report	
1997	June 21	16	Ron Hornaday Jr.	Dale Earnhardt, Inc.	Chevrolet	200	106.6 (171.556)	1:30:37	70.583	Report	
1998	June 20	16	Ron Hornaday Jr.	Dale Earnhardt, Inc.	Chevrolet	206*	109.798 (176.702)	1:21:45	80.883	Report	
1999	June 5	24	Jack Sprague	Hendrick Motorsports	Chevrolet	200	106.6 (171.556)	1:24:51	75.38	Report	
2000 – 2002	Not held										
2003	August 20	16	Travis Kvapil	Xpress Motorsports	Chevrolet	200	106.6 (171.556)	1:12:01	88.813	Report	
2004	August 25	99	Carl Edwards	Roush Racing	Ford	206*	109.798 (176.702)	1:28:26	74.495	Report	
2005	August 24	5	Mike Skinner	Bill Davis Racing	Toyota	200	106.6 (171.556)	1:16:42	83.39	Report	
2006	August 23	6	Mark Martin	Roush Racing	Ford	200	106.6 (171.556)	1:28:44	72.081	Report	
2007	August 22	23	Johnny Benson Jr.	Bill Davis Racing	Toyota	200	106.6 (171.556)	1:29:40	71.331	Report	
2008	August 20	51	Kyle Busch	Billy Ballew Motorsports	Toyota	203*	108.199 (174.129)	1:39:17	65.388	Report	
2009	August 19	51	Kyle Busch	Billy Ballew Motorsports	Toyota	200	106.6 (171.556)	1:14:24	85.968	Report	
2010	August 18	18	Kyle Busch	Kyle Busch Motorsports	Toyota	206*	109.798 (176.702)	1:39:54	65.945	Report	
2011	August 24	2	Kevin Harvick	Kevin Harvick Incorporated	Chevrolet	200	106.6 (171.556)	1:31:26	69.953	Report	
2012	August 22	17	Timothy Peters	Red Horse Racing	Toyota	204*	108.732 (174.987)	1:21:52	79.69	Report	
2013	August 21	51	Kyle Busch	Kyle Busch Motorsports	Toyota	200	106.6 (171.556)	1:14:54	85.394	Report	
2014	August 21*	19	Brad Keselowski	Brad Keselowski Racing	Ford	200	106.6 (171.556)	1:09:35	91.919	Report	
2015	August 19	29	Ryan Blaney	Brad Keselowski Racing	Ford	202*	107.666 (173.271)	1:20:16	80.481	Report	
2016	August 17	33	Ben Kennedy	GMS Racing	Chevrolet	200	106.6 (171.556)	1:25:59	74.387	Report	
2017	August 16	46	Kyle Busch	Kyle Busch Motorsports	Toyota	203*	108.199 (174.129)	1:13:05	88.829	Report	
2018	August 16	21	Johnny Sauter	GMS Racing	Chevrolet	200	106.6 (171.556)	1:16:57	83.119	Report	
2019	August 15	24	Brett Moffitt	GMS Racing	Chevrolet	200	106.6 (171.556)	1:36:56	65.983	Report	
2020	September 17	24	Sam Mayer	GMS Racing	Chevrolet	200	106.6 (171.556)	1:17:57	82.503	Report	
2021	September 16	18	Chandler Smith	Kyle Busch Motorsports	Toyota	200	106.6 (171.556)	1:47:32	59.479	Report	
2022	September 15	66	Ty Majeski	ThorSport Racing	Toyota	200	106.6 (171.556)	1:24:37	74.705	Report	
2023	September 14	11	Corey Heim	Tricon Garage	Toyota	200	106.6 (171.556)	1:16:06	84.047	Report	
2024	September 19	38	Layne Riggs	Front Row Motorsports	Ford	200	106.6 (171.556)	1:20:24	79.552	Report	
2025	September 11	34	Layne Riggs	Front Row Motorsports	Ford	250	133.25 (214.043)	1:27:42	91.163	Report	
2026	September 17	98	Jake Garcia	ThorSport Racing	Ford	250	133.25 (214.043)	1:33:44	85.295	Report	
2027	August 12									Report	

- 1998, 2004, 2008, 2010, 2012, 2015, & 2017: These races were extended due to a NASCAR Overtime finish.
- 2014: Race postponed to Thursday morning due to rain.

==== Multiple winners (drivers) ====
# Wins	Driver	Years won
5	Kyle Busch	2008-2010, 2013, 2017
2	Ron Hornaday Jr.	1997, 1998
2	Layne Riggs	2024, 2025

==== Multiple winners (teams) ====
# Wins	Team	Years won
4	GMS Racing	2016, 2018-2020
4	Kyle Busch Motorsports	2010, 2013, 2017, 2021
2	Dale Earnhardt, Inc.	1997, 1998
2	Roush Racing	2004, 2006
2	Bill Davis Racing	2005, 2007
2	Billy Ballew Motorsports	2008, 2009
2	Brad Keselowski Racing	2014, 2015
2	Front Row Motorsports	2024, 2025
2	ThorSport Racing	2022, 2026

==== Manufacturer wins ====
# Wins	Make	Years won
11	(Japan) Toyota	2005, 2007-2010, 2012, 2013, 2017, 2021, 2022, 2023
10	(United States) Chevrolet	1996-1999, 2003, 2011, 2016, 2018-2020
8	(United States) Ford	1995, 2004, 2006, 2014, 2015, 2024-2026

Previous race: Buckle Up South Carolina 200	NASCAR Truck Series; Tennessee Army National Guard 250	Next race: SpeedyCash.com 250

Previous race: TSport 200	NASCAR Truck Series; UNOH 250	Next race: TBA
