= 1996 Tyson Holly Farms 400 =

Race details
- Race 27 of 31 in the 1996 NASCAR Winston Cup Series
- 1996 Tyson Holly Farms 400 program cover
- Date: September 29, 1996
- Location: North Wilkesboro Speedway, North Wilkesboro, North Carolina
- Course: Permanent racing facility
- Course length: 0.625 miles (1.006 km)
- Distance: 400 laps, 250 mi (402.336 km)
- Weather: Temperatures up to 66 °F (19 °C); wind speeds up to 6.9 miles per hour (11.1 km/h)
- Average speed: 96.837 mph (155.844 km/h)

Pole position
Driver	Ted Musgrave	Roush Racing
- Time: 19.059

Most laps led
Driver	Jeff Gordon	Hendrick Motorsports
- Laps: 207

Winner
No. 24	Jeff Gordon	Hendrick Motorsports

Television in the United States
- Network: ESPN
- Announcers: Bob Jenkins, Benny Parsons, Ned Jarrett

Radio in the United States
- Radio: MRN
- Booth announcers: Allen Bestwick and Barney Hall
- Turn announcers: Joe Moore (Backstretch)

The 1996 Tyson Holly Farms 400 was the twenty-seventh stock car race of the 1996 NASCAR Winston Cup Series. It was held on September 29, 1996, at North Wilkesboro Speedway in Wilkes County, North Carolina. The 400-lap race was won by Jeff Gordon of the Hendrick Motorsports team after he started from second position. Dale Earnhardt finished second and Dale Jarrett came in third.

== Entry list ==
No.	Driver	Make	Team
1	Rick Mast	Pontiac	Richard Jackson
2	Rusty Wallace	Ford	Roger Penske
3	Dale Earnhardt	Chevrolet	Richard Childress
4	Sterling Marlin	Chevrolet	Larry McClure
5	Terry Labonte	Chevrolet	Rick Hendrick
6	Mark Martin	Ford	Jack Roush
7	Geoff Bodine	Ford	Geoff Bodine
8	Hut Stricklin	Ford	Stavola Brothers
9	Lake Speed	Ford	Harry Melling
10	Ricky Rudd	Ford	Ricky Rudd
11	Brett Bodine	Ford	Brett Bodine
12	Derrike Cope	Ford	Bobby Allison
15	Wally Dallenbach Jr.	Ford	Bud Moore
16	Ted Musgrave	Ford	Jack Roush
17	Darrell Waltrip	Chevrolet	Darrell Waltrip
18	Bobby Labonte	Chevrolet	Joe Gibbs
21	Michael Waltrip	Ford	Wood Brothers
23	Jimmy Spencer	Ford	Travis Carter
24	Jeff Gordon	Chevrolet	Rick Hendrick
25	Ken Schrader	Chevrolet	Rick Hendrick
28	Ernie Irvan	Ford	Yates Racing
29	Jeff Green	Chevrolet	Gary Bechtel
30	Johnny Benson Jr.	Pontiac	Chuck Rider
33	Robert Pressley	Chevrolet	Leo Jackson
37	Jeremy Mayfield	Ford	Michael Kranefuss
41	Ricky Craven	Chevrolet	Larry Hedrick
42	Kyle Petty	Pontiac	Felix Sabates
43	Bobby Hamilton	Pontiac	Petty Enterprises
71	Dave Marcis	Chevrolet	Dave Marcis
75	Morgan Shepherd	Ford	Butch Mock
77	Bobby Hillin Jr.	Ford	Doug Bawel
81	Kenny Wallace	Ford	Fil Martocci
87	Joe Nemechek	Chevrolet	Joe Nemechek
88	Dale Jarrett	Ford	Yates Racing
94	Bill Elliott	Ford	Bill Elliott
98	John Andretti	Ford	Cale Yarborough
99	Jeff Burton	Ford	Jack Roush

== Report ==
=== Background ===
Before the race Jeff Gordon led the Drivers' Championship with 3,903 points, eighty-one ahead of Hendrick Motorsports teammate Terry Labonte in second, with Dale Jarrett a further eighty-one points adrift in third. Dale Earnhardt was fourth on 3,562, and Mark Martin was a further seventy-nine behind in fifth place. Martin was the race's defending champion.

It was announced shortly beforehand that the Tyson Holly Farms 400 would be the last NASCAR race held at North Wilkesboro Speedway after the track was sold to promoters Bruton Smith and Bob Bahre following the death of its previous owner Enoch Staley in 1995. North Wilkesboro's two races would be taken over by Smith's Texas Motor Speedway in the spring and Bahre's New Hampshire Motor Speedway in the fall starting from 1997 as part of a schedule realignment.

=== First round qualifying ===
First-round qualifying started at 3 p.m. on Friday. Bobby Hamilton, driving the popular #43 Petty Enterprises Pontiac, had the fastest run before rain interrupted qualifying with 13 of the 40 drivers still waiting to make their run. After a 2 1/2-hour delay qualifying resumed with Jeff Gordon, the defending series champion, being the first driver to make a qualifying lap. Gordon put his #24 Chevrolet on top of the charts with a lap of 117.937 mph. Gordon's run held until Ted Musgrave, driving for Jack Roush in the #16 Family Channel/Primestar Ford Thunderbird, won the pole with a lap of 118.054 mph. It was Musgrave's first pole of the season and the fifth and final pole of his career. Hamilton ended up 3rd, with defending race winner Mark Martin and Ernie Irvan filling out the top five starting spots.

=== Second round qualifying ===
With only the top 25 locked in times from the first round qualifying the previous day, Second-round qualifying allowed drivers to stand on their first-round times or make a second attempt. Only 6 drivers made a second-round attempt on Saturday. Hut Stricklin was the fastest in second-round qualifying, and Dale Jarrett also improved on his first day's effort. Race provisionals went to Geoff Bodine, Lake Speed, Robert Pressley, and Jeff Green. Darrell Waltrip got the past champion's provisional. Three drivers, Ward Burton, Dick Trickle and Gary Bradberry, failed to qualify.

=== Final Practice ===
Rain cut final practice short for Cup teams. Jeff Gordon completed just 15 laps when his car developed engine problems, later found to be debris in the carburetor.

== Race ==
The race started at 1 P.M. on Sunday. From the 2nd starting spot, Jeff Gordon jumped out past pole sitter Ted Musgrave to lead the first few laps of the race. On lap 22 the first caution came out for debris on the track. Gordon had a dominant car throughout the race. An accident on the front-stretch between Ernie Irvan, Kyle Petty and Bobby Hamilton brought out the 2nd caution on lap 72. At halfway, Gordon lead and collected the $10,000 halfway leader bonus. Another caution came out on lap 261 for oil on the track. Robert Pressley's accident in turn 3 brought out the final caution on lap 315. With 79 laps to go, Gordon moved past Dale Earnhardt on a restart and took the lead for the final time. Gordon would win the race by 1.73 seconds over Earnhardt. Dale Jarrett, Jeff Burton and Terry Labonte rounded out the top five. It was Gordon's 10th win of the season and third win in a row after victories at Dover and Martinsville. The highest-finishing rookie, Johnny Benson, finishing 17th. Pole sitter Ted Musgrave failed to lead a lap and ended up finished 19th in the 37-car field. The race featured 18 Lead changes between 8 different drivers throughout the day with Gordon leading a race-high 207 laps. Every car that started the race was running at the finish.

== Race results ==
Pos	Grid	No.	Driver	Team	Manufacturer	Laps	Status	Laps Led	Points
1	2	24	Jeff Gordon	Hendrick Motorsports	Chevrolet	400	running	207	185
2	11	3	Dale Earnhardt	Richard Childress Racing	Chevrolet	400	running	35	175
3	30	88	Dale Jarrett	Robert Yates Racing	Ford	400	running	0	165
4	14	99	Jeff Burton	Roush Racing	Ford	400	running	2	165
5	16	5	Terry Labonte	Hendrick Motorsports	Chevrolet	400	running	0	155
6	28	1	Rick Mast	Precision Products Racing	Pontiac	400	running	0	150
7	21	10	Ricky Rudd	Rudd Performance Motorsports	Ford	400	running	17	151
8	3	43	Bobby Hamilton	Petty Enterprises	Pontiac	400	running	48	147
9	4	6	Mark Martin	Roush Racing	Ford	400	running	29	143
10	9	2	Rusty Wallace	Penske Racing South	Ford	400	running	43	139
11	13	4	Sterling Marlin	Morgan-McClure Motorsports	Chevrolet	400	running	0	130
12	10	21	Michael Waltrip	Wood Brothers Racing	Ford	399	running	0	127
13	18	18	Bobby Labonte	Joe Gibbs Racing	Chevrolet	399	running	0	124
14	19	75	Morgan Shepherd	Butch Mock Motorsports	Ford	399	running	0	121
15	27	81	Kenny Wallace	FILMAR Racing	Ford	399	running	0	118
16	26	8	Hut Stricklin	Stavola Brothers Racing	Ford	399	running	0	115
17	6	30	Johnny Benson Jr.	Bahari Racing	Pontiac	398	running	0	112
18	24	25	Ken Schrader	Hendrick Motorsports	Chevrolet	398	running	0	109
19	1	16	Ted Musgrave	Roush Racing	Ford	398	running	0	106
20	32	23	Jimmy Spencer	Travis Carter Enterprises	Ford	398	running	0	103
21	12	94	Bill Elliott	Bill Elliott Racing	Ford	398	running	0	100
22	20	41	Ricky Craven	Larry Hedrick Motorsports	Chevrolet	397	running	0	97
23	31	11	Brett Bodine	Brett Bodine Racing	Ford	397	running	0	94
24	23	98	John Andretti	Cale Yarborough Motorsports	Ford	397	running	0	91
25	34	9	Lake Speed	Melling Racing	Ford	397	running	0	88
26	29	87	Joe Nemechek	NEMCO Motorsports	Chevrolet	396	running	0	85
27	37	17	Darrell Waltrip	Darrell Waltrip Motorsports	Chevrolet	396	running	0	82
28	15	37	Jeremy Mayfield	Kranefuss-Haas Racing	Ford	395	running	0	79
29	22	71	Dave Marcis	Marcis Auto Racing	Chevrolet	395	running	0	76
30	33	7	Geoff Bodine	Geoff Bodine Racing	Ford	394	running	0	73
31	25	42	Kyle Petty	Team SABCO	Pontiac	394	running	0	70
32	36	29	Jeff Green	Diamond Ridge Motorsports	Chevrolet	394	running	0	67
33	35	33	Robert Pressley	Leo Jackson Motorsports	Chevrolet	392	running	0	64
34	17	15	Wally Dallenbach Jr.	Bud Moore Engineering	Ford	391	running	0	61
35	8	77	Bobby Hillin Jr.	Jasper Motorsports	Ford	389	running	0	58
36	5	28	Ernie Irvan	Robert Yates Racing	Ford	388	running	19	60
37	7	12	Derrike Cope	Bobby Allison Motorsports	Ford	369	running	0	52

=== Race statistics ===
- Time of race: 2:34:54
- Average Speed: 96.837 mph
- Pole Speed: 118.054 mph
- Cautions: 4 Cautions for 29 laps
- Margin of Victory: 1.73 seconds
- Lead changes: 18 between 8 drivers
- Percent of race run under caution: 7.25%
- Average green flag run: 74.2 Laps

=== Post-race ===
The results meant Gordon extended his lead in the Drivers' Championship, ahead of Labonte and Jarrett. Earnhardt and Martin rounded out the top five positions. The race took two hours. thirty-four minutes and fifty-four seconds to complete, and the margin of victory was 1.73 seconds.

Previous race: 1996 Hanes 500	Winston Cup Series; 1996 season	Next race: 1996 UAW-GM Quality 500
