= NASCAR Truck Series at New Hampshire Motor Speedway =

NASCAR Truck Series race

Team EJP 175

NASCAR Truck Series
- Venue: New Hampshire Motor Speedway
- Location: Loudon, New Hampshire, United States
- Corporate sponsor: Everett J. Prescott Inc.
- First race: 1996
- Distance: 185.15 miles (297.97 km)
- Laps: 175; Stages 1/2: 55; Stage 3: 65
- Previous names: Pennzoil / VIP Tripleheader (1996); Pennzoil Discount Center 200 (1997); Pennzoil / VIP Auto Discount Tripleheader (1998); Pennzoil / VIP Auto Discount 200 (1999) thatlook.com 200 (2000); New England 200 (2001–2002); Sylvania 200 Presented by Lowe's (2004–2005); New Hampshire 200 (2003, 2006–2007); Camping World RV Rental 200 Driven by Winnebago Industries (2008); Heluva Good! 200 (2009); TheRaceDayRaffleSeries.com 175 (2010); F.W. Webb 175 (2011); UNOH 175 (2014–2017)
- Most wins (driver): Kyle Busch; Ron Hornaday Jr. (3)
- Most wins (team): Kyle Busch Motorsports (4)
- Most wins (manufacturer): Chevrolet; Toyota (8)

Circuit information
- Surface: Asphalt
- Length: 1.058 mi (1.703 km)
- Turns: 4

Pickup truck racing events in the NASCAR Truck Series have been held at New Hampshire Motor Speedway in Loudon, New Hampshire from 1996 to 2017 (except in 2012 and 2013), and again in 2025. The race is held as a 175 lap race under the name Team EJP 175 for sponsorship reasons.

Layne Riggs is the defending race winner.

== History ==
The race was 200 laps in length from 1996 until 2010, when the distance was shortened to 175 laps. Between 2014 and 2017, and again in 2025–, it was held the day before the Cup Series' fall race at the track.

After a two-year absence from the 2012 and 2013 Truck Series schedules, it returned to the series schedule in 2014.

On March 8, 2017, it was announced that Las Vegas Motor Speedway would get a second Cup date, second Xfinity date, and second Truck date. The Cup and Truck races that will be given to Vegas will come from New Hampshire, making the 2017 running the last race.

The race returned on the schedule in 2025 after the Xfinity race was dropped. On June 27, 2025, Everett J. Prescott Inc. was named title sponsor.

== Past winners ==
Year	Date	No.	Driver	Team	Manufacturer	Race Distance		Race Time	Average Speed (mph)	Report	Ref
Year	Date	No.	Driver	Team	Manufacturer	Laps	Miles (km)	Race Time	Average Speed (mph)	Report	Ref
1996	September 8	16	Ron Hornaday Jr.	Dale Earnhardt, Inc.	Chevrolet	206*	217.948 (350.753)	2:14:38	97.129	Report	
1997	May 31	3	Jay Sauter	Richard Childress Racing	Chevrolet	200	211.6 (340.537)	2:10:42	97.138	Report	
1998	August 2	60	Andy Houston	Addington Racing	Chevrolet	200	211.6 (340.537)	2:01:49	104.222	Report	
1999	August 1	1	Dennis Setzer	K Automotive Racing	Dodge	202*	213.716 (343.942)	2:05:57	101.81	Report	
2000	July 8	99	Kurt Busch	Roush Racing	Ford	204*	215.832 (347.347)	2:11:29	98.491	Report	
2001	July 21	24	Jack Sprague	Hendrick Motorsports	Chevrolet	200	211.6 (340.537)	1:56:13	109.244	Report	
2002	July 20	29	Terry Cook	K Automotive Racing	Ford	207*	219.006 (352.455)	2:06:54	103.549	Report	
2003	September 13	2	Jimmy Spencer	Ultra Motorsports	Dodge	200	211.6 (340.537)	2:02:14	103.867	Report	
2004*	September 18	24	Travis Kvapil	Bang Racing	Toyota	200	211.6 (340.537)	2:21:53	89.482	Report	
2005	September 17	14	Rick Crawford	Circle Bar Racing	Ford	200	211.6 (340.537)	2:05:24	101.244	Report	
2006	September 16	23	Johnny Benson Jr.	Bill Davis Racing	Toyota	200	211.6 (340.537)	2:17:31	92.323	Report	
2007	September 15	33	Ron Hornaday Jr.	Kevin Harvick Inc.	Chevrolet	200	211.6 (340.537)	1:55:39	109.78	Report	
2008	September 13	33	Ron Hornaday Jr.	Kevin Harvick Inc.	Chevrolet	200	211.6 (340.537)	2:09:11	98.279	Report	
2009	September 19	51	Kyle Busch	Billy Ballew Motorsports	Toyota	200	211.6 (340.537)	1:53:15	112.106	Report	
2010	September 18	18	Kyle Busch	Kyle Busch Motorsports	Toyota	175	185.15 (297.97)	1:50:27	100.579	Report	
2011	September 24	18	Kyle Busch	Kyle Busch Motorsports	Toyota	175	185.15 (297.97)	1:33:35	118.707	Report	
2012 – 2013	Not held										
2014	September 20	00	Cole Custer*	Haas Racing Development	Chevrolet	175	185.15 (297.97)	1:43:40	107.161	Report	
2015	September 26	33	Austin Dillon	GMS Racing	Chevrolet	175	185.15 (297.97)	1:56:50	95.084	Report	
2016	September 24	9	William Byron	Kyle Busch Motorsports	Toyota	175	185.15 (297.97)	1:56:31	95.343	Report	
2017	September 23	4	Christopher Bell	Kyle Busch Motorsports	Toyota	175	185.15 (297.97)	1:46:05	104.72	Report	
2018 – 2024	Not held										
2025	September 20	11	Corey Heim	Tricon Garage	Toyota	175	185.15 (297.97)	2:06:12	88.027	Report	
2026	August 22	34	Layne Riggs	Front Row Motorsports	Ford	189*	199.96 (321.808)	2:18:59	86.325	Report	
2027	September 26									Report	

- 1996, 1999, 2000, 2002 & 2026: This race was extended due to a NASCAR Overtime finish.
- 2004: Race delayed 5 hours due to rain from Hurricane Ivan but eventually got underway. After a caution came out with two laps to go in the scheduled distance, an overtime finish was planned, but darkness had rolled in due to the late start. Instead of having an overtime finish, officials decided to end the race under caution at the end of the scheduled distance.
- 2014: This was Cole Custer's first truck win, making him the youngest winner in NASCAR national touring series history at 16 years, 7 months and 28 days.

=== Multiple winners (drivers) ===
# Wins	Driver	Years won
3	Ron Hornaday Jr.	1996, 2007, 2008
3	Kyle Busch	2009, 2010, 2011

=== Multiple winners (teams) ===
# Wins	Team	Years won
4	Kyle Busch Motorsports	2010, 2011, 2016, 2017
2	K Automotive Racing	1999, 2002
2	Kevin Harvick Inc.	2007, 2008

=== Manufacturer wins ===
# Wins	Make	Years won
8	(United States) Chevrolet	1996, 1997, 1998, 2001, 2007, 2008, 2014, 2015
8	(Japan) Toyota	2004, 2006, 2009, 2010, 2011, 2016, 2017, 2025
4	(United States) Ford	2000, 2002, 2005, 2026
2	(United States) Dodge	1999, 2003

Previous race: TBA	NASCAR Truck Series; Team EJP 175	Next race: RaceToStopSuicide.com 200
