= NASCAR Truck Series at North Wilkesboro Speedway =

NASCAR Truck Series race

FaithFest 250

NASCAR FedEx Freight Truck Series
- Venue: North Wilkesboro Speedway
- Location: North Wilkesboro, North Carolina
- Corporate sponsor: FaithFest
- First race: 1995
- Distance: 156.25 miles (251.46 kilometers)
- Laps: 250; Stages 1 & 2: 70 laps Stage 3: 110 laps
- Previous names: Lowe's 150 (1995); Lowe's 250 (1996); Tyson 250 (2023); Wright Brand 250 (2024); Window World 250 (2025)
- Most wins (driver): Chandler Smith (2)
- Most wins (team): Front Row Motorsports (2)
- Most wins (manufacturer): Ford (4)

Circuit information
- Surface: Asphalt
- Length: 0.625 mi (1.006 km)
- Turns: 4

Pickup truck races in the NASCAR FedEx Freight Truck Series have been held at North Wilkesboro Speedway in North Carolina in 1995 and 1996, and since 2023 as a support race for the NASCAR Cup Series race weekend. The race is currently known as FaithFest 250 for sponsorship reasons.

== History ==
In 1995, the race was the Lowe's 150 and the race in 1996 was the Lowe's 250.

The first Truck Series race at North Wilkesboro in 1995 featured the return of Cup Series driver Ernie Irvan, who was not able to race for over a year after suffering an injury in the 1994 Cup Series race at Michigan in August. He entered the race to get re-acclimated to racing so he would be better prepared for the Cup Series race on the same weekend. Mike Bliss would win that race. It was his first Truck Series win.

The 1996 race was lengthened from 150 laps to 250 laps. Full-time Cup Series driver Mark Martin would win the race. It was his first Truck Series win. After this race, he would not enter another Truck Series race until the 2005 season-finale at Homestead-Miami Speedway.

The race returned to the schedule in 2023. On February 17, 2023, Tyson Foods was announced as the title sponsor for the 2023 race called the Tyson 250. The company was previously the title sponsor of the fall Cup Series race at North Wilkesboro from 1990 to 1996. After the track closed and became abandoned, their logo remained on the track's scoring pylon.

Since then, the race has had numerous sponsors including Wright Brand Foods, which is owned by Tyson Foods, in 2024, in 2025, North Wilkesboro-based business, Window World, would be the title sponsor of the race, and in 2026, FaithFest, a Christian music festival in the North Wilkesboro area, would assume naming rights for the race.

== Past winners ==
Year	Date	No.	Driver	Team	Manufacturer	Race distance		Race time	Average speed (mph)	Race report	Ref
Year	Date	No.	Driver	Team	Manufacturer	Laps	Miles (km)	Race time	Average speed (mph)	Race report	Ref
1995	September 30	2	Mike Bliss	Ultra Motorsports	Ford	150	93.75 (150.876)	0:58:31	96.126	Report	
1996	September 28	99	Mark Martin	Roush Racing	Ford	250	156.25 (251.46)	1:50:02	85.201	Report	
1997 – 2022	Not held										
2023	May 20	7	Kyle Larson	Spire Motorsports	Chevrolet	252*	157.5 (253.471)	2:17:25	68.769	Report	
2024	May 18–19	11	Corey Heim	Tricon Garage	Toyota	250	156.25 (251.46)	1:53:02	82.94	Report	
2025	May 17	38	Chandler Smith	Front Row Motorsports	Ford	255*	159.375 (256.489)	1:45:33	90.597	Report	
2026	July 18	38	Chandler Smith	Front Row Motorsports	Ford	250	156.25 (251.46)	1:42:19	91.627	Report	
2027	May 21									Report	

- 2023 and 2025: Races extended due to NASCAR Overtime.
- 2024: Race was started on 18th but after the first stage it was postponed to the 19th due to the Track flooding.

=== Multiple winners (drivers) ===
# Wins	Driver	Years won
2	Chandler Smith	2025, 2026

=== Multiple winners (teams) ===
# Wins	Team	Years won
2	Front Row Motorsports	2025, 2026

=== Manufacturer wins ===
# Wins	Make	Years won
4	(United States) Ford	1995, 1996, 2025, 2026
1	(United States) Chevrolet	2023
1	(Japan) Toyota	2024

Previous race: TBA	NASCAR Craftsman Truck Series; FaithFest 250	Next race: North Carolina Education Lottery 200
