= NASCAR Truck Series at Kansas Speedway =

NASCAR Truck Series race at Kansas Speedway

NASCAR Truck Series
- Venue: Kansas Speedway
- Location: Kansas City, Kansas, United States

Circuit information
- Surface: Asphalt
- Length: 1.5 mi (2.4 km)
- Turns: 4

Stock car racing events in the NASCAR Truck Series have been held at Kansas Speedway, in Kansas City, Kansas during numerous seasons and times of year since 2001. Both races are 134 laps and 201 miles (323 km) each.

In 2020, the track had three Truck Series races, starting with a doubleheader in July due to the schedule changes caused by the COVID-19 pandemic. Also beginning in 2020, the track began hosting an annual fall race as a replacement for the race at Eldora Speedway due to COVID-19, from 2020–2024, and returning in 2026. A third race was added after an event was moved from Chicagoland Speedway due to the COVID-19 pandemic.

== Spring race ==
TBA
- First race: 2001
- Distance: 201 miles (323 km)
- Laps: 134; Stages 1/2: 30 each Final stage: 74
- Previous names: O'Reilly Auto Parts 250 (2001–2011); SFP 250 (2012–2014); Toyota Tundra 250 (2015–2017); 37 Kind Days 250 (2018); Digital Ally 250 (2019); Blue-Emu Maximum Pain Relief 200 (2020, 1st) e.p.t. 200 (2020, 2nd); WISE Power 200 (2021); Heart of America 200 (2022-2024); Heart of Health Care 200 (2025)
- Most wins (driver): Matt Crafton; Kyle Busch (3)
- Most wins (team): Kyle Busch Motorsports (5)
- Most wins (manufacturer): Toyota (12)

The Truck Series spring race at Kansas is a NASCAR Truck Series race at Kansas Speedway in Kansas City, Kansas that has been held since 2001. The race is held on the weekend of the NASCAR Cup Series' AdventHealth 400. Kaden Honeycutt is the defending race winner.

=== History ===
The inaugural race was run on July 7, 2001, and was won by Ricky Hendrick.

The race has had multiple sponsors including: O'Reilly Auto Parts, SFP, Toyota Tundra, 37 Kind Days, Ally, and WillCo Intelligent Stored Energy (WISE) Power.

In 2022, AdventHealth became the new title sponsor of the Cup and Truck Series spring races at Kansas. The name of the Truck Series race was decided by a contest for AdventHealth employees. The winning name was "Heart of America". In 2025, to promote National Nurses Week, the race was renamed as the Heart of Health Care 200.

In 2026, the race was moved to the fall, joining the Hollywood Casino 400, after the Kansas Lottery 300 was moved to the spring.

=== Past winners ===
Year	Date	No.	Driver	Team	Manufacturer	Race Distance		Race Time	Average Speed (mph)	Report	Ref
Year	Date	No.	Driver	Team	Manufacturer	Laps	Miles (km)	Race Time	Average Speed (mph)	Report	Ref
2001	July 7	17	Ricky Hendrick	Hendrick Motorsports	Chevrolet	167	250.5 (403.14)	2:00:09	125.094	Report	
2002	July 6	16	Mike Bliss	Xpress Motorsports	Chevrolet	167	250.5 (403.14)	2:03:43	121.487	Report	
2003	July 5	50	Jon Wood	Roush Racing	Ford	167	250.5 (403.14)	2:11:33	114.253	Report	
2004	July 3	99	Carl Edwards	Roush Racing	Ford	167	250.5 (403.14)	2:21:48	105.994	Report	
2005	July 2	30	Todd Bodine	Germain Racing	Toyota	170*	255 (410.382)	2:10:23	117.346	Report	
2006	July 1	10	Terry Cook	ppc Racing	Ford	167	250.5 (403.14)	2:14:42	111.581	Report	
2007	April 28	99	Erik Darnell	Roush Fenway Racing	Ford	167	250.5 (403.14)	2:00:49	124.405	Report	
2008	April 26	33	Ron Hornaday Jr.	Kevin Harvick Inc.	Chevrolet	167	250.5 (403.14)	2:22:02	105.82	Report	
2009	April 25/27*	5	Mike Skinner	Randy Moss Motorsports	Toyota	132*	198 (318.65)	2:08:11	92.68	Report	
2010	May 2	13	Johnny Sauter	ThorSport Racing	Chevrolet	167	250.5 (403.14)	2:15:29	110.936	Report	
2011	June 4	2	Clint Bowyer	Kevin Harvick Inc.	Chevrolet	167	250.5 (403.14)	2:04:32	120.691	Report	
2012	April 21	31	James Buescher	Turner Motorsports	Chevrolet	167	250.5 (403.14)	2:04:06	121.112	Report	
2013	April 20	88	Matt Crafton	ThorSport Racing	Toyota	167	250.5 (403.14)	2:25:53	103.028	Report	
2014	May 9	51	Kyle Busch	Kyle Busch Motorsports	Toyota	167	250.5 (403.14)	2:20:25	107.039	Report	
2015	May 8	88	Matt Crafton	ThorSport Racing	Toyota	167	250.5 (403.14)	1:47:31	139.875	Report	
2016	May 6	9	William Byron	Kyle Busch Motorsports	Toyota	170*	255 (410.382)	2:21:00	108.511	Report	
2017	May 12	51	Kyle Busch	Kyle Busch Motorsports	Toyota	167	250.5 (403.14)	2:18:34	108.468	Report	
2018	May 11	18	Noah Gragson	Kyle Busch Motorsports	Toyota	167	250.5 (403.14)	1:52:03	134.137	Report	
2019	May 10	45	Ross Chastain	Niece Motorsports	Chevrolet	167	250.5 (403.14)	2:01:41	123.517	Report	
2020*	July 24	16	Austin Hill	Hattori Racing Enterprises	Toyota	134	201 (323.477)	1:35:27	126.349	Report	
2020*	July 25*	88	Matt Crafton	ThorSport Racing	Ford	134	201 (323.477)	1:58:13	102.016	Report	
2021	May 1	51	Kyle Busch	Kyle Busch Motorsports	Toyota	140*	210 (337.961)	1:45:22	119.582	Report	
2022	May 14	38	Zane Smith	Front Row Motorsports	Ford	134	201 (323.477)	1:34:26	127.709	Report	
2023	May 6	23	Grant Enfinger	GMS Racing	Chevrolet	134	201 (323.477)	1:59:24	101.005	Report	
2024	May 4	11	Corey Heim	Tricon Garage	Toyota	134	201 (323.477)	1:30:52	132.722	Report	
2025	May 10	7	Carson Hocevar	Spire Motorsports	Chevrolet	134	201 (323.477)	1:48:49	110.829	Report	
2026	Not Held										
2027	May 8									Report	

- 2005, 2016 and 2021: Race extended due to a NASCAR Overtime finish.
- 2009: Race suspended on Saturday, finished on Monday and shortened due to rain.
- 2020 I: Race postponed from May 30 to July 24 due to the COVID-19 pandemic. The race distance was shortened from 250 to 200 miles due to the series having a second race at the track the next day.
- 2020 II: Race moved from Chicagoland Speedway due to the COVID-19 pandemic.

==== Multiple winners (drivers) ====
# Wins	Team	Years won
3	Matt Crafton	2013, 2015, 2020 (Race 2 of 2)
3	Kyle Busch	2014, 2017, 2021

==== Multiple winners (teams) ====
# Wins	Team	Years won
5	Kyle Busch Motorsports	2014, 2016-2018, 2021
4	ThorSport Racing	2010, 2013, 2015, 2020 (Race 2 of 2)
3	Roush Fenway Racing	2003, 2004, 2007
2	Kevin Harvick Inc.	2008, 2011
2	Tricon Garage	2024

==== Manufacturer wins ====
# Wins	Make	Years won
12	(Japan) Toyota	2005, 2009, 2013-2018, 2020 (Race 1 of 2), 2021, 2024
9	(United States) Chevrolet	2001, 2002, 2008, 2010-2012, 2019, 2023, 2025
6	(United States) Ford	2003, 2004, 2006, 2007, 2020 (Race 2 of 2), 2022

== Fall race ==
RaceToStopSuicide.com 200
- First race: 2020
- Distance: 201 miles (323 km)
- Laps: 134; Stages 1/2: 30 each Final stage: 74
- Previous names: Clean Harbors 200 (2020); Kansas Lottery 200 (2022–2023); Kubota Tractor 200 (2024)
- Most wins (manufacturer): Chevrolet; Toyota (2)

The RaceToStopSuicide.com 200 is an annual fall race held at Kansas Speedway in Kansas City, Kansas since 2020. The race is held on the weekend of the NASCAR Cup Series' Hollywood Casino 400. Kaden Honeycutt is the defending race winner.

=== History ===
The race was initially added to the series' schedule in 2020 after the COVID-19 pandemic resulted in the cancellation of the series' race at Eldora Speedway in Ohio.

The fall race did not return for 2021. The race returned in 2022, now replacing the fall race at Las Vegas Motor Speedway as an annual event.

It was removed from the schedule following the 2024 season, however, on August 20, 2025, the lone race at Kansas was moved to the fall, as the Kansas Lottery 300 was moved to spring. The race was called the RaceToStopSuicide.com 200.

=== Past winners ===
Year	Date	No.	Driver	Team	Manufacturer	Race Distance		Race Time	Average Speed (mph)	Report	Ref
Year	Date	No.	Driver	Team	Manufacturer	Laps	Miles (km)	Race Time	Average Speed (mph)	Report	Ref
2020*	October 17	23	Brett Moffitt	GMS Racing	Chevrolet	139*	208.5 (335.547)	1:44:18	119.942	Report	
2021	Not held										
2022	September 9	4	John Hunter Nemechek	Kyle Busch Motorsports	Toyota	134	200 (321.867)	1:42:11	118.023	Report	
2023	September 8	19	Christian Eckes	McAnally–Hilgemann Racing	Chevrolet	134	200 (321.867)	1:47:43	111.96	Report	
2024	September 27	11	Corey Heim	Tricon Garage	Toyota	134	200 (321.867)	1:35:50	125.843	Report	
2025	Not Held										
2026	September 26	11	Kaden Honeycutt	Tricon Garage	Toyota	134	201 (323.477)	2:09:41	92.996	Report	
2027	October 1									Report	

- 2020: Race extended due to a NASCAR Overtime finish.

==== Multiple winners (Teams) ====
# Wins	Make	Years won
2	Tricon Garage	2024, 2026

==== Manufacturer wins ====
# Wins	Make	Years won
2	(United States) Chevrolet	2020, 2023
2	(Japan) Toyota	2022, 2024, 2026

Previous race: SpeedyCash.com 250	NASCAR Truck Series; TBA	Next race: FaithFest 250

Previous race: Team EJP 175	NASCAR Truck Series; RaceToStopSuicide.com 200	Next race: Ecosave 200
