= 1996 UAW-GM Quality 500 =

28th race of the 1996 NASCAR Winston Cup Series

Race details
- Race 28 of 31 in the 1996 NASCAR Winston Cup Series
- The 1996 UAW-GM Quality 500 program cover, with artwork by NASCAR artist Sam Bass.
- Date: October 6, 1996
- Official name: 37th Annual UAW-GM Quality 500
- Location: Concord, North Carolina, Charlotte Motor Speedway
- Course: Permanent racing facility
- Course length: 1.5 miles (2.41 km)
- Distance: 334 laps, 501 mi (806.281 km)
- Average speed: 143.143 miles per hour (230.366 km/h)

Pole position
Driver	Bobby Labonte	Joe Gibbs Racing
- Time: 29.337

Most laps led
Driver	Terry Labonte	Hendrick Motorsports
- Laps: 129

Winner
No. 5	Terry Labonte	Hendrick Motorsports

Television in the United States
- Network: TBS
- Announcers: Ken Squier, Buddy Baker, Dick Berggren

Radio in the United States
- Radio: Performance Racing Network

The 1996 UAW-GM Quality 500 was the 28th stock car race of the 1996 NASCAR Winston Cup Series and the 37th iteration of the event. The race was held on Sunday, October 6, 1996, in Concord, North Carolina, at Charlotte Motor Speedway, a 1.5 miles (2.4 km) permanent quad-oval. The race took the scheduled 334 laps to complete. In the late stages of the race, Hendrick Motorsports driver Terry Labonte would manage to make a late-race charge to the front, managing to close and come within one point of teammate Jeff Gordon in the point standings after a late season slump by Gordon. The win was Labonte's 18th career NASCAR Winston Cup Series victory and his second and final victory of the season. To fill out the top three, Roush Racing driver Mark Martin and Robert Yates Racing driver Dale Jarrett would finish second and third, respectively.

== Background ==
The layout of Charlotte Motor Speedway, the venue where the race was held.

Charlotte Motor Speedway is a motorsports complex located in Concord, North Carolina, United States 13 miles from Charlotte, North Carolina. The complex features a 1.5 miles (2.4 km) quad oval track that hosts NASCAR racing including the prestigious Coca-Cola 600 on Memorial Day weekend and the NASCAR All-Star Race, as well as the UAW-GM Quality 500. The speedway was built in 1959 by Bruton Smith and is considered the home track for NASCAR with many race teams located in the Charlotte area. The track is owned and operated by Speedway Motorsports Inc. (SMI) with Marcus Smith as track president.

=== Entry list ===
- (R) denotes rookie driver.

#	Driver	Team	Make
0	Delma Cowart	H. L. Waters Racing	Ford
1	Rick Mast	Precision Products Racing	Pontiac
2	Rusty Wallace	Penske Racing South	Ford
02	Robbie Faggart	Miles Motorsports	Chevrolet
3	Dale Earnhardt	Richard Childress Racing	Chevrolet
4	Sterling Marlin	Morgan–McClure Motorsports	Chevrolet
5	Terry Labonte	Hendrick Motorsports	Chevrolet
6	Mark Martin	Roush Racing	Ford
7	Geoff Bodine	Geoff Bodine Racing	Ford
8	Hut Stricklin	Stavola Brothers Racing	Ford
9	Lake Speed	Melling Racing	Ford
10	Ricky Rudd	Rudd Performance Motorsports	Ford
11	Brett Bodine	Brett Bodine Racing	Ford
12	Derrike Cope	Bobby Allison Motorsports	Ford
14	Robby Gordon	Dale Earnhardt, Inc.	Chevrolet
15	Wally Dallenbach Jr.	Bud Moore Engineering	Ford
16	Ted Musgrave	Roush Racing	Ford
17	Darrell Waltrip	Darrell Waltrip Motorsports	Chevrolet
18	Bobby Labonte	Joe Gibbs Racing	Chevrolet
19	Loy Allen Jr.	TriStar Motorsports	Ford
21	Michael Waltrip	Wood Brothers Racing	Ford
22	Ward Burton	Bill Davis Racing	Pontiac
23	Jimmy Spencer	Haas-Carter Motorsports	Ford
24	Jeff Gordon	Hendrick Motorsports	Chevrolet
25	Ken Schrader	Hendrick Motorsports	Chevrolet
27	Todd Bodine	David Blair Motorsports	Ford
28	Ernie Irvan	Robert Yates Racing	Ford
29	Chad Little	Diamond Ridge Motorsports	Chevrolet
30	Johnny Benson Jr. (R)	Bahari Racing	Pontiac
33	Robert Pressley	Leo Jackson Motorsports	Chevrolet
37	Jeremy Mayfield	Kranefuss-Haas Racing	Ford
40	Greg Sacks	Team SABCO	Chevrolet
41	Ricky Craven	Larry Hedrick Motorsports	Chevrolet
42	Kyle Petty	Team SABCO	Pontiac
43	Bobby Hamilton	Petty Enterprises	Pontiac
71	Dave Marcis	Marcis Auto Racing	Chevrolet
75	Morgan Shepherd	Butch Mock Motorsports	Ford
77	Bobby Hillin Jr.	Jasper Motorsports	Ford
78	Billy Standridge	Triad Motorsports	Ford
81	Kenny Wallace	FILMAR Racing	Ford
87	Joe Nemechek	NEMCO Motorsports	Chevrolet
88	Dale Jarrett	Robert Yates Racing	Ford
90	Dick Trickle	Donlavey Racing	Ford
94	Bill Elliott	Bill Elliott Racing	Ford
95	Gary Bradberry	Sadler Brothers Racing	Ford
97	Chad Little	Mark Rypien Motorsports	Pontiac
98	Jeremy Mayfield	Cale Yarborough Motorsports	Ford
99	Jeff Burton	Roush Racing	Ford

== Qualifying ==
Qualifying was split into two rounds. The first round was held on Wednesday, October 2, at 3:00 PM EST. Each driver would have one lap to set a time. During the first round, the top 25 drivers in the round would be guaranteed a starting spot in the race. If a driver was not able to guarantee a spot in the first round, they had the option to scrub their time from the first round and try and run a faster lap time in a second round qualifying run, held on Thursday, October 3, at 1:30 PM EST. As with the first round, each driver would have one lap to set a time. For this specific race, positions 26-38 would be decided on time, and depending on who needed it, a select amount of positions were given to cars who had not otherwise qualified but were high enough in owner's points.

Bobby Labonte, driving for Joe Gibbs Racing, would win the pole, setting a time of 29.337 and an average speed of 184.068 miles per hour (296.229 km/h).

Five drivers would fail to qualify: Joe Nemechek, Gary Bradberry, Dave Marcis, Robbie Faggart, and Delma Cowart.

=== Full qualifying results ===
Pos.	#	Driver	Team	Make	Time	Speed
1	18	Bobby Labonte	Joe Gibbs Racing	Chevrolet	29.337	184.068
2	24	Jeff Gordon	Hendrick Motorsports	Chevrolet	29.577	182.574
3	37	Jeremy Mayfield	Kranefuss-Haas Racing	Ford	29.597	182.451
4	43	Bobby Hamilton	Petty Enterprises	Pontiac	29.626	182.272
5	27	Todd Bodine	David Blair Motorsports	Ford	29.626	182.272
6	29	Jeff Green	Diamond Ridge Motorsports	Chevrolet	29.628	182.260
7	99	Jeff Burton	Roush Racing	Ford	29.635	182.217
8	41	Ricky Craven	Larry Hedrick Motorsports	Chevrolet	29.679	181.947
9	28	Ernie Irvan	Robert Yates Racing	Ford	29.695	181.849
10	88	Dale Jarrett	Robert Yates Racing	Ford	29.716	181.720
11	21	Michael Waltrip	Wood Brothers Racing	Ford	29.718	181.708
12	6	Mark Martin	Roush Racing	Ford	29.730	181.635
13	14	Robby Gordon	Dale Earnhardt, Inc.	Chevrolet	29.731	181.629
14	22	Ward Burton	Bill Davis Racing	Pontiac	29.736	181.598
15	75	Morgan Shepherd	Butch Mock Motorsports	Ford	29.819	181.093
16	5	Terry Labonte	Hendrick Motorsports	Chevrolet	29.820	181.087
17	30	Johnny Benson Jr. (R)	Bahari Racing	Pontiac	29.868	180.796
18	1	Rick Mast	Precision Products Racing	Pontiac	29.885	180.693
19	16	Ted Musgrave	Roush Racing	Ford	29.886	180.687
20	9	Lake Speed	Melling Racing	Ford	29.892	180.650
21	94	Bill Elliott	Bill Elliott Racing	Ford	29.895	180.632
22	11	Brett Bodine	Brett Bodine Racing	Ford	29.900	180.602
23	2	Rusty Wallace	Penske Racing South	Ford	29.941	180.355
24	8	Hut Stricklin	Stavola Brothers Racing	Ford	29.961	180.234
25	77	Bobby Hillin Jr.	Jasper Motorsports	Ford	29.985	180.090
26	7	Geoff Bodine	Geoff Bodine Racing	Ford	29.987	180.078
27	25	Ken Schrader	Hendrick Motorsports	Chevrolet	30.000	180.000
28	23	Jimmy Spencer	Travis Carter Enterprises	Ford	30.005	179.970
29	90	Dick Trickle	Donlavey Racing	Ford	30.026	179.844
30	97	Chad Little	Mark Rypien Motorsports	Pontiac	30.028	179.832
31	98	John Andretti	Cale Yarborough Motorsports	Ford	30.034	179.796
32	78	Billy Standridge	Triad Motorsports	Ford	30.041	179.754
33	4	Sterling Marlin	Morgan–McClure Motorsports	Chevrolet	30.049	179.706
34	3	Dale Earnhardt	Richard Childress Racing	Chevrolet	30.060	179.641
35	40	Greg Sacks	Team SABCO	Chevrolet	30.065	179.611
36	12	Derrike Cope	Bobby Allison Motorsports	Ford	30.076	179.545
37	15	Wally Dallenbach Jr.	Bud Moore Engineering	Ford	30.125	179.253
38	19	Loy Allen Jr.	TriStar Motorsports	Ford	30.147	179.122
Provisionals
39	10	Ricky Rudd	Rudd Performance Motorsports	Ford	-*	-*
40	42	Kyle Petty	Team SABCO	Pontiac	-*	-*
41	81	Kenny Wallace	FILMAR Racing	Ford	-*	-*
42	33	Robert Pressley	Leo Jackson Motorsports	Chevrolet	-*	-*
Champion's Provisional
43	17	Darrell Waltrip	Darrell Waltrip Motorsports	Chevrolet	-*	-*
Failed to qualify
44	87	Joe Nemechek	NEMCO Motorsports	Chevrolet	-*	-*
45	95	Gary Bradberry	Sadler Brothers Racing	Ford	-*	-*
46	71	Dave Marcis	Marcis Auto Racing	Chevrolet	-*	-*
47	02	Robbie Faggart	Miles Motorsports	Chevrolet	-*	-*
48	0	Delma Cowart	H. L. Waters Racing	Ford	-*	-*
Official first round qualifying results
Official starting lineup

== Race results ==
Fin	St	#	Driver	Team	Make	Laps	Led	Status	Pts	Winnings
1	16	5	Terry Labonte	Hendrick Motorsports	Chevrolet	334	129	running	185	$133,950
2	12	6	Mark Martin	Roush Racing	Ford	334	56	running	175	$85,100
3	10	88	Dale Jarrett	Robert Yates Racing	Ford	334	0	running	165	$58,300
4	33	4	Sterling Marlin	Morgan–McClure Motorsports	Chevrolet	334	0	running	160	$60,100
5	8	41	Ricky Craven	Larry Hedrick Motorsports	Chevrolet	334	86	running	160	$63,400
6	34	3	Dale Earnhardt	Richard Childress Racing	Chevrolet	334	15	running	155	$44,700
7	14	22	Ward Burton	Bill Davis Racing	Pontiac	334	0	running	146	$37,500
8	23	2	Rusty Wallace	Penske Racing South	Ford	334	0	running	142	$35,000
9	11	21	Michael Waltrip	Wood Brothers Racing	Ford	334	0	running	138	$31,000
10	21	94	Bill Elliott	Bill Elliott Racing	Ford	334	0	running	134	$31,100
11	7	99	Jeff Burton	Roush Racing	Ford	334	11	running	135	$26,900
12	20	9	Lake Speed	Melling Racing	Ford	334	0	running	127	$24,300
13	39	10	Ricky Rudd	Rudd Performance Motorsports	Ford	333	0	running	124	$26,250
14	17	30	Johnny Benson Jr. (R)	Bahari Racing	Pontiac	333	0	running	121	$22,450
15	18	1	Rick Mast	Precision Products Racing	Pontiac	333	0	running	118	$21,450
16	28	23	Jimmy Spencer	Travis Carter Enterprises	Ford	333	1	running	120	$19,450
17	19	16	Ted Musgrave	Roush Racing	Ford	332	0	running	112	$18,450
18	36	12	Derrike Cope	Bobby Allison Motorsports	Ford	332	0	running	109	$17,950
19	4	43	Bobby Hamilton	Petty Enterprises	Pontiac	332	0	running	106	$20,050
20	26	7	Geoff Bodine	Geoff Bodine Racing	Ford	332	0	running	103	$23,450
21	5	27	Todd Bodine	David Blair Motorsports	Ford	332	0	running	100	$7,900
22	30	97	Chad Little	Mark Rypien Motorsports	Pontiac	331	0	running	97	$6,195
23	15	75	Morgan Shepherd	Butch Mock Motorsports	Ford	330	0	running	94	$9,515
24	35	40	Greg Sacks	Team SABCO	Chevrolet	330	0	running	91	$5,875
25	24	8	Hut Stricklin	Stavola Brothers Racing	Ford	330	0	running	88	$9,340
26	6	29	Jeff Green	Diamond Ridge Motorsports	Chevrolet	328	0	running	85	$16,615
27	32	78	Billy Standridge	Triad Motorsports	Ford	328	0	running	82	$5,500
28	22	11	Brett Bodine	Brett Bodine Racing	Ford	327	0	running	79	$15,580
29	27	25	Ken Schrader	Hendrick Motorsports	Chevrolet	325	0	running	76	$15,370
30	41	81	Kenny Wallace	FILMAR Racing	Ford	325	1	running	78	$8,365
31	2	24	Jeff Gordon	Hendrick Motorsports	Chevrolet	319	14	running	75	$35,070
32	42	33	Robert Pressley	Leo Jackson Motorsports	Chevrolet	314	0	running	67	$14,995
33	37	15	Wally Dallenbach Jr.	Bud Moore Engineering	Ford	311	0	axle	64	$14,415
34	38	19	Loy Allen Jr.	TriStar Motorsports	Ford	286	0	handling	61	$4,890
35	29	90	Dick Trickle	Donlavey Racing	Ford	230	0	crash	58	$4,865
36	25	77	Bobby Hillin Jr.	Jasper Motorsports	Ford	228	0	crash	55	$4,840
37	9	28	Ernie Irvan	Robert Yates Racing	Ford	208	0	crash	52	$20,220
38	13	14	Robby Gordon	Dale Earnhardt, Inc.	Chevrolet	206	0	crash	49	$4,800
39	31	98	John Andretti	Cale Yarborough Motorsports	Ford	206	0	crash	46	$5,300
40	1	18	Bobby Labonte	Joe Gibbs Racing	Chevrolet	179	21	engine	48	$48,900
41	40	42	Kyle Petty	Team SABCO	Pontiac	114	0	engine	40	$11,800
42	43	17	Darrell Waltrip	Darrell Waltrip Motorsports	Chevrolet	88	0	clutch	37	$11,800
43	3	37	Jeremy Mayfield	Kranefuss-Haas Racing	Ford	17	0	crash	34	$15,300
Official race results

Previous race: 1996 Tyson Holly Farms 400	NASCAR Winston Cup Series; 1996 season	Next race: 1996 AC Delco 400
