= North Wilkesboro Speedway =

Motorsport track in the United States

- Oval (1947–present)
- Location: 381 Speedway Lane; North Wilkesboro, North Carolina, United States; 28659
- Coordinates: 36°8′32″N 81°4′21″W
- Capacity: 19,800
- Owner: Speedway Motorsports (2007–present); Bruton Smith and Bob Bahre (1995–2007); Staley and Combs families (1953–1995); Enoch Staley and the Mastin brothers (1947–1953)
- Opened: Initial: May 18, 1947; 79 years ago Second: September 5, 2010; 16 years ago Third: August 2, 2022; 4 years ago
- Closed: First: January 1, 1997; 29 years ago Second: May 10, 2011; 15 years ago
- Construction cost: US$3,000
- Major events: Current: NASCAR Cup Series; Window World 450 (1951–1996, 2026); NASCAR All-Star Race (2023–2025, 2027); Tyson Holly Farms 400 (1949–1955, 1957–1996); NASCAR Truck Series; FaithFest 250 (1995–1996, 2023–present); CARS Tour (2010, 2022–present); SMART Modified Tour (1989–1992, 1996, 2024–2026); Future: NASCAR O'Reilly Auto Parts Series; NASCAR O'Reilly Auto Parts Series at North Wilkesboro Speedway (1983–1985, 2027); Former: NASCAR Whelen Modified Tour (2023–2025)
- Website: northwilkesborospeedway.com

Oval (1947–present)
- Surface: Asphalt
- Length: 0.625 mi (1.006 km)
- Turns: 4
- Banking: Turns: 14° Straights: 3°
- Race lap record: 0:18.362 ( (United States) Kyle Larson, Chevrolet Camaro ZL1, 2024, NASCAR Cup)

North Wilkesboro Speedway is a 0.625 mi (1.006 km) paved oval short track in North Wilkesboro, North Carolina, United States. The track has hosted a variety of racing events since its inaugural season of racing in 1947; primarily races sanctioned by NASCAR. The facility has a capacity of 19,800 as of 2023. North Wilkesboro Speedway is currently owned by Speedway Motorsports, LLC (SMI) and led by track executive director Graig Hoffman.

In the mid-1940s, local Carolinian Enoch Staley built a track near the Brushy Mountains with help from Lawson Curry, John Mastin, and the Combs family. NWS was propped up with NASCAR Cup Series races soon after with help from NASCAR founder Bill France Sr. Until the 1990s, the track was owned by the Staley and Combs families with each controlling half-interest, in the process becoming ubiquitous for its connection to NASCAR's roots relating to moonshine runners. After Enoch died in 1995, and with popularity for NASCAR exploding in the 1990s, Speedway Motorsports (SMI) owner Bruton Smith and businessman Bob Bahre each bought out half interest from the families. Due to a strained relationship between the two along with the facility's reputation of lacking amenities, NWS was left desolated by 1997 to extreme local opposition. SMI later bought full control of the track in 2007. After two decades of failed attempts to revive the track by various groups, Bruton's successor, Marcus Smith, led a successful campaign to resume major racing at the facility after increasing pressure from drivers and North Wilkesboro locals in the early 2020s.

== Description ==
=== Configuration ===
The speedway in its current form is measured at 0.625 mi (1.006 km), with 13 degrees of banking in the turns and 3 degrees of banking on the track's straightaways. The frontstretch is graded at a downhill slope and the backstretch is graded uphill, which is attributed to founder Enoch Staley running out of funds when constructing the facility. NWS is asymmetrical. Before 1957, North Wilkesboro Speedway utilized a dirt surface. In late August of that year, developers opted to pave the track; it was completed by mid-September.

=== Amenities ===
North Wilkesboro Speedway is right next to U.S. Route 421. As of 2023, the track has a reported capacity of 25,000 according to The Sporting News. At its peak, NWS had a capacity of 55,000 according to a 1996 report from The Herald-Sun.

As of 2024, a currently ongoing effort by track developers to both modernize the facility and retain the vintage aesthetic of NWS is being made. As a result of it, most of the original structures built before 1996, including suites and a tower featuring a Winston Cigarettes-sponsored mural have been preserved. Modern amenities, such as new SAFER barriers, lighting systems, and sewer systems have or are planned to be added to modernize the facility as part of renovations.

== Track history ==
=== Beginnings, first years ===
In 1945, Enoch Staley, who at the time was working numerous jobs at a variety of industries, went to watch a stock car race in Spartanburg, South Carolina, with his friend, John Mastin. According to Staley in an interview with the Winston-Salem Journal, after watching the race, "I fell in love with racing... I was hooked." Soon after World War II, Staley was offered to purchase a plot of land from Lawson Curry, which Staley accepted. Staley later partnered with Curry, Mastin, Jack Combs, Charlie Combs, and Bill France Sr. to build the facility, with Enoch and France Sr. investing $1,500 (adjusted for inflation, $26,825) each. Funding quickly ran out due to the cost of grading, causing the track to be shorter in distance than planned and uneven in elevation. Originally, North Wilkesboro Speedway utilized a dirt surface, with developers adding a 14 ton mixture of calcium chloride and salt into the track to prevent dust. In interviews given by Staley, he did not expect the facility to last more than a year, stating, "back then, promoters built tracks like they might not run but one race. We were like the rest of them... We didn't know where we were going, and we didn't have any long-range plans." Initially, Enoch, John Mastin, and John's brother Oscar each owned some interest the facility.

According to NASCAR personality Junior Johnson, unofficial races organized by local moonshiners christened the facility. Official races promoted by Bill France Sr. were later scheduled to run soon after on May 18, 1947, with officials expecting the largest crowd at a sporting event within Wilkes County, North Carolina, at the time. In its first official race, a crowd of approximately than 10,000 saw Fonty Flock win a modified feature race. Two years later, the France Sr.-founded NASCAR Strictly Stock Series (now known as the NASCAR Cup Series) ran their first races at the facility. In 1953, both Mastin brothers sold their interest of NWS to Jack Combs.

=== Moonshine runner connections, slow timeline of renovations ===
Throughout the track's history, it became renowned for its connection to moonshine runners; a common activity within the Wilkes County area that has its roots in the American Prohibition era. The town of North Wilkesboro, considered to be the "Moonshine Capital of the World" by the 1950s, was a moonshine runner haven, with moonshine contributing a sizable part of the North Wilkesboro economy. Many within the Carolinas who participated in moonshine running were also directly involved in the formation of stock car racing, which subsequently created NASCAR. In 1965, the track, along with North Wilkesboro native and former moonshine runner Junior Johnson, were featured in an Esquire article written by journalist Tom Wolfe. The article itself is considered to be a key point in expanding the knowledge of NASCAR outside of its core Southeastern United States market.

"Maybe [North Wilkesboro] already seemed like an oddity [early] because NASCAR had already started its push toward bigger, faster and longer. In the 1960s, superspeedways broke ground in Atlanta, Pocono and Talladega. By 1975, the Daytona 500 was offering a purse of more than a quarter-million dollars. North Wilkesboro (and other short tracks like Bristol, Richmond and Nashville) couldn’t even put up $50,000. Flush with cash from ticket sales, bigger tracks could offer more and build more. A sellout a Daytona meant 110,000 fans then. North Wilkesboro? Fifteen thousand."

— Jeremy Markovich in a 2015 SB Nation article, which in part addressed the lack of capacity and purse money for North Wilkesboro Speedway compared to larger tracks

NWS was slow in improving the amenities through most of its lifespan prior to the 1980s, making gradual improvements every few years. In 1955, construction started on a new concrete grandstand to replace the original wooden grandstands, with the new grandstand seating around 5,200. It was completed by April 1956. Enoch announced the track's paving in June 1957; it was completed by September of that year. Four years later, renovations to the infield and the addition of 3,500 seats were made. By 1963, the facility was recorded to have 8,500 permanent seats, with a total capacity of 15,000 according to the Winston-Salem Journal. A year after, NWS went through its first repave. In 1976, a 3,500-seat grandstand named in honor of Junior Johnson was constructed along with a 1/4 mile (0.40 km) concrete retaining wall that replaced a guardrail.

Throughout most of the 1980s and 1990s, efforts were made to add additional amenities and capacity to modernize NWS. At the end of the 1970s, the track surface was repaved. However, by September 1980, the track surface drew complaints from drivers for its quick deterioration. At the end of the 1980 Holly Farms 400, winner Bobby Allison stated that it was a "disgrace to have to run on a track [surface] like this". As a result, it was repaved by December of that year. Eight years later, a new infield, roofed garage and a multi-purpose building were constructed in the track's infield; before, crews had to stop working when rain pelted the track due to a lack of cover. In 1990, along with the addition of 3,100 seats, an electronic scoring pylon was added, replacing the last manual scoreboard on the Winston Cup Series schedule. The original West Grandstands were also expanded and renovated in 1992, with chairs replacing barren concrete tiers. Additional suites were added three years later.

=== Conflict between NASCAR's roots and 1990s popularity explosion ===
In the mid-1990s, stock car racing oversaw a major rise in popularity. Despite NASCAR vice president of competition Mike Helton declaring that "the Cup schedule can't grow much more" in January 1995, a boom period of developers announcing plans to build modern, high-capacity tracks in new markets such as Las Vegas, the Dallas–Fort Worth metroplex, and St. Louis was kickstarted. Due to this, NASCAR beat reporters began predicting that NASCAR would have to abandon longtime staples, such as NWS, in the search of newer, broader markets.

By the start of the 1990s, NWS was known as a vintage, dilapidated facility that lacked both basic amenities and capacity given by more modern tracks. Monte Dutton, writer for The Gaston Gazette, wrote about the lack of modern telephones for members of the press in the 1990s, stating that only four phones were available; three being rotary dials. Although eventual buyer Bob Bahre later conceded that the track was profitable, he maintained that the track could not keep up with the growing minimum purse amounts needed. The track was also lacking in capacity; although peak capacity was reported at 60,000 in 1996, according to Bahre, grandstand seats totaled to a lackluster 34,000, with Bahre stating in The News & Observer, "The Lord fed a whole city with a loaf of bread, but I don't think for one damn minute you can get 60,000 people in 34,000 seats." Despite efforts to modernize NWS, drivers also began making calls for NASCAR to move into modern facilities; longtime driver Rusty Wallace declared in 1996, "we need to be at the tracks that are best for teams and sponsors... from better pit road facilities to bigger purses". In addition, the track was also near the facilities of Bristol Motor Speedway and Martinsville Speedway, which had expanded in the 1990s.

==== Bruton Smith and Bob Bahre purchase, subsequent Bruton–Bahre feud ====
Enoch Staley died on May 20, 1995. In an interview with SB Nation's Jeremy Markovich, Enoch's son, Mike, stated that after Enoch's death is when "all the buzzards came in". According to Markovich, soon after Enoch's death, motorsports businessman Bruton Smith, founder of Speedway Motorsports, Inc, (SMI), drove over to the Combs family to negotiate the sale of the Combs' half interest of the track. Having started on building the Texas Motor Speedway that year, he proposed to the family to move one of North Wilkesboro's race weekends to Texas and move the remaining race weekend to a Wednesday primetime slot. On June 20, The Charlotte Observer reported that they accepted the offer at an undisclosed price; it was later revealed to be sold for $6.05 million according to the News & Record. Mike stated in interviews at the time that while he was surprised at the news, he was "fine" at the purchase. He later admitted, however, that "I couldn’t be partners with Bruton". Mary Staley, widow of Enoch, also refused to sell their family's interest of the track to Bruton. After Bruton's purchase, owner of the New Hampshire International Raceway, Bob Bahre, negotiated with the Staley family to purchase the remaining half-interest. Bahre was only interested in taking its remaining Winston Cup Series weekend, wanting to give the track back to the Staley family to run NASCAR Busch Series and NASCAR Truck Series races. Although the Staley family expressed "pure agony" at the offer, they relented after realizing their financial situation. On January 2, 1996, Bahre's purchase was officially announced, which was later revealed to be at a price of $8 million.

At the time, the purchase led to thoughts of NWS's Winston Cup Series dates being in jeopardy. Two days after Bahre's purchase, Bruton and Bahre announced that while the 1996 First Union 400 would take place, the future afterward would be unknown; though, other NASCAR series races were expected to be run in the future. Although Bahre stated a public desire to move the fall Winston Cup Series date to New Hampshire, he stated that both Bruton and NASCAR CEO Bill France Jr. would have to approve of it. Bruton then claimed that he had no plans to move a NWS date to Texas and stated concern for the state of Wilkes County, stating, "We need to think about the community." Due to Bruton's claims, predictions were made that the September race, the 1996 Tyson Holly Farms 400, would still run, with Texas gaining a race weekend later that year in November. Bahre later claimed that although he had scheduled meetings with Bruton over the approval, Bruton had not contacted him back by January 6; he also stated that he did not know Bruton's plans of leaving the track's September date. In February, Bruton reaffirmed his attentions to keep the September date by proposing the idea of a single-day race weekend; however, he still had not met with Bahre. By mid-April, Charlotte Observer writer Tom Higgins reported that the September race was most likely going to be run.

"Bruton says he’s made me an offer and the ball’s in my court. Well, the ball’s not in my court because I won’t accept any offer he gives me anyway. He did make an offer, but we told him no, or rather we told his attorney. He’s not going to buy my half because I didn’t buy it to sell. I won’t sell it if he gave me $50 million. I didn’t buy it to sell. I bought it to move a date up here to New Hampshire."

— Bob Bahre's comments on his resistance to sell his interest to Bruton Smith, April 11, 1996

Bahre stated on April 11 a reluctance to sell his interest to Bruton, saying, "Bruton is pretty bitter about [my purchase]"... I won't accept any offer he gives me." At the 1996 First Union 400, the duo met for the first time in more than two months; although they stated intents on running the Holly Farms 400, they did not clarify NWS or Texas' future in remaining on the Winston Cup Series schedule. The Holly Farms 400 was later confirmed to run on April 24, with France Jr. vetoing Bahre's offer to move the race to New Hampshire within the 1996 season due to time restraints within the month. In May, although Bahre had engaged in multiple previous meetings with Bruton's close associate, Humpy Wheeler, no agreement between him and Bruton was made. Bahre accused Bruton of holding up the agreement because Bruton did not want a balanced deal, instead wanting to own full interest of the track to obtain full control of NWS' two Winston Cup Series dates. However, in late-June, the two finally came to an agreement, with the duo stating hopes to jointly announce their intentions in the coming weeks. Before the official announcement, predictions arose that North Wilkesboro would lose both of its dates, with its spring date moving to Texas and its fall date moving to New Hampshire pending approval from France Jr.

On July 9, The Charlotte Observer reported that an unnamed source related to NASCAR confirmed NASCAR's decision to move the spring NWS date to Texas. Bahre reported a day later that after negotiations with France Jr. that "things are going to work out". The next day, both Bruton and Bahre, in separate press conferences, confirmed NASCAR's decision to move the NWS Winston Cup Series races to their respective facilities, ending Cup series racing at the facility. NASCAR did state plans to run other NASCAR series races at NWS to keep the facility open. At the time, many within the industry met the decision with a reluctant acceptance for the move, finding it necessary to continue NASCAR's "progress" of expansion. Immediately after the purchase, however, the future of any NASCAR racing at NWS was met with doubt due to Bahre and Bruton's relationship, entering a bitter dispute because both wanted full control of the facility for themselves. Bruton then threatened to shut down the track if he didn't obtain full control; he later backtracked on his comment, stating that he was willing to "preserve some things at North Wilkesboro". However, by September, NASCAR spokesman Kevin Triplett stated that the organization had no plans to schedule NASCAR Busch Series or Truck Series races at the facility because both owners did not ask for them. A group led by Junior Johnson was formed that month in a last-ditch effort to purchase the facility, but Bahre refused to accept the offer. Bahre stated hopes of selling his share of the facility back to the Staley family, but he was only willing to do so on the condition that Bruton did the same.

==== Era of abandon ====
NWS' final points-paying Winston Cup Series race, the 1996 Tyson Holly Farms 400, ran on September 29, 1996. Two months later, NASCAR released their 1997 season schedules for the Busch and Craftsman Truck Series; NWS was left off both of them. Though the track was essentially considered defunct, Bahre still stated hopes of hosting some type of local racing at the facility, with Bahre accusing Bruton of an attempt to "throw the Staleys under the bus". After a failed stockholders' meeting on December 19, on January 3, 1997, the Winston-Salem Journal reported that the facility was officially closed with all employees being laid off; the only exception was longtime employee Paul Call, who was designated as a caretaker after he begged Bruton and Bahre for a deal to live on the property. In February, Bahre relaxed his position on selling his interest, stating that he "probably" would if the Staley family gave him approval. The next month, parts of the facility were damaged in a windstorm, kickstarting the facility's deterioration. Three months later, SMI leadership stated hopes of holding a charity Busch Series race at NWS; the proposal, however, was considered dead by July according to Bahre. The owners later sold off the track's equipment the following year.

Updates on the facility remained at a slow pace afterward, with the track continuing to deteriorate. In 1999, both owners petitioned the North Carolina Property Tax Commission to reduce the track's tax value because it was "outdated". That same year, Bruton stated to The Charlotte Observer stated that as long as he did not have full control over the speedway, he would not do anything to revive it, stating, "[SMI] only own[s] 50 percent and we’re not going to use our wonderful assets — our people — for something that we only own 50 percent of." By August 1999, according to Bahre, he and Bruton had not talked to each other in a year and a half. Two years later, hopes of reviving the track under joint ownership were reported to be essentially dead; Bahre stated in an interview that although he saw the possibility of the track's revival, it was "probably going to be after Bruton and I are in heaven or hell". In early 2003, Johnson stated renewed interest of purchasing the track to run lower-series racing or to redesignate it as a testing facility; however, the possibility of a sale was shot down by Bruton, who thought that the amount of money required to revive it was too much, stating that it was "fast returning to the earth". Later that year, a petition organized by real-estate agent Robert Glen that proposed to condemn the track so the Wilkes County government could sell it to an investor through eminent domain got 3,312 signatures; it was rejected.

"There are some tracks that need to be scrapped. And maybe the sport would be better off if those events were held somewhere else. North Wilkesboro Speedway was old, old, old. Decrepit. Had no sewer system. The track was worn out. And NASCAR was very appreciative of closing it. They wanted it closed. Maybe there are another one or two tracks that need to be closed, too."

— Bruton Smith's comments upon purchasing full interest of North Wilkesboro Speedway, November 3, 2007

In October 2004, the track hosted a private test session for NASCAR team Roush Racing; the first activities for the facility in over eight years. In May 2005, two North Wilkesboro city commissioners proposed a long-shot proposal to place the newly-announced NASCAR Hall of Fame at NWS despite the city of North Wilkesboro not being on the shortlist of finalists for a location. A month later, another petition, this time organized by Robert Marsden under the name Save the Speedway (STS), drew around 2,000 online signatures. Bruton later proposed an offer to the Wilkes County government for $12 million for full interest pending Bahre's approval, which Bahre stated that he would most likely agree to. STS stated hopes that the county would later lease the track to them after they purchased. STS later announced in 2006 that an unnamed investor committed $1 million to the proposal; however, the investor parted ways the next month, sending them "back to square one". Another offer made in the year, by a group led by Worth Mitchell, was also proposed. However, by November, Bruton, albeit reluctantly, bought out Bahre's control of the track as part of a package deal in purchasing the New Hampshire International Raceway when Bahre retired from the motorsports business. Bruton later stated plans that hinted at the track's demolition. Two years after Bruton's purchase, he approved a short-term lease to Georgian racing promoter Charles Collins, who aimed to produce a reality television show and start a women-only racing series at the facility. However, in July 2009, Collins was arrested and jailed by Wilkes County police, with Collins being charged on five felonies.

=== Short-lived revival, Paul Call efforts to preserve track ===
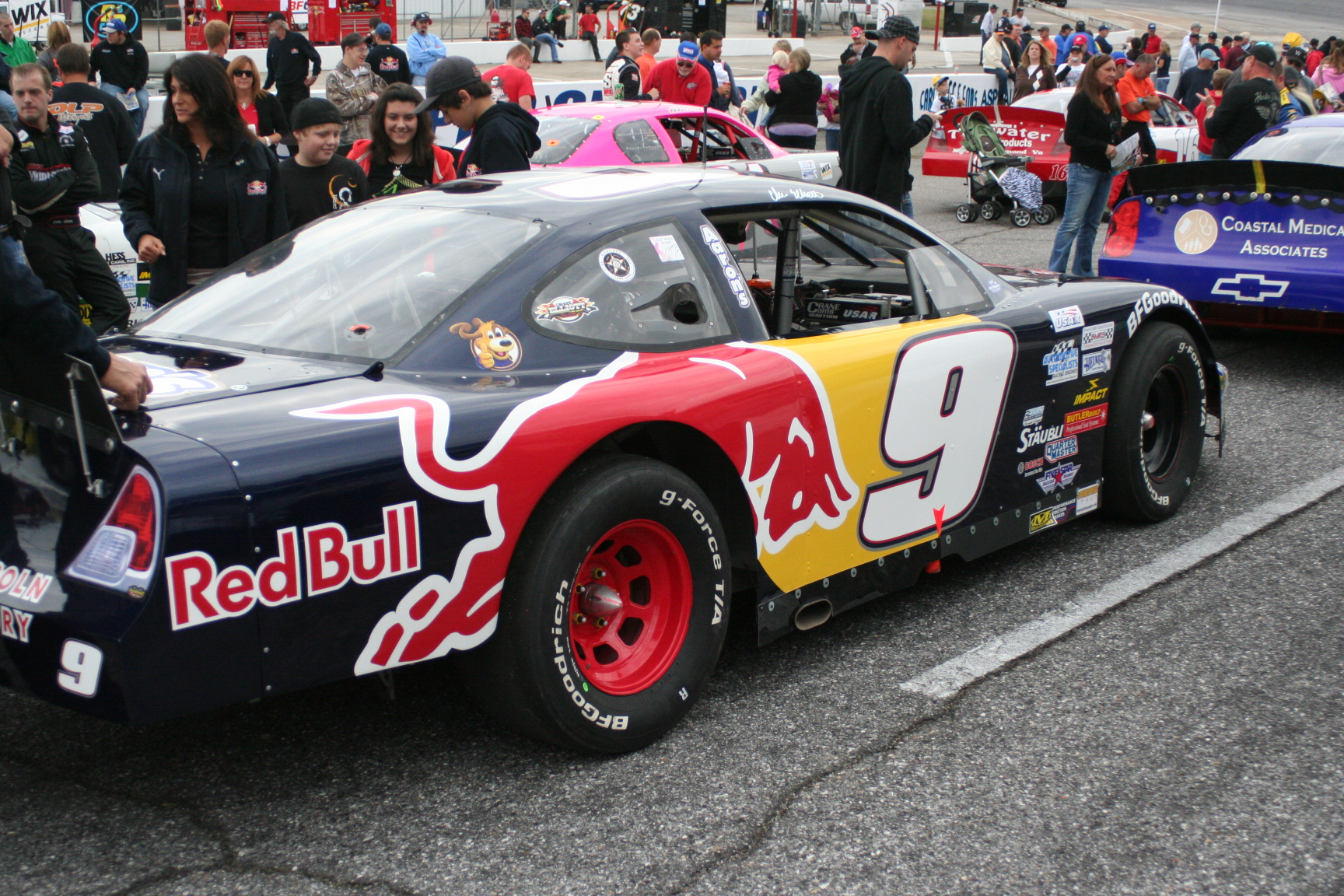
Chase Elliott's Pro All Star Series car at North Wilkesboro Speedway in 2010. Elliott won the first race under the short-lived Alton McBride Jr.-led lease.

In early November 2009, an ownership group led by Alton McBride Jr. operating under the name Speedway Associates announced their intents to host USARacing Pro Cup Series races at NWS in October 2010. The group obtained a three-year lease from Bruton, and was viewed initially as a positive, legitimate offer by the Wilkes Economic Development Corporation. By November 10, events sanctioned by the American Speed Association (ASA) and Pro All Stars Series (PASS) were also added. However, in January 2010, Don Alexander, the director of Wilkes Economic Development, found out that McBride Jr. was involved in several bouts of legal issues, including bankruptcy and marriage issues. Despite this, Alexander pledged his support to McBride Jr. The track held its first activities in May of that year, hosting a movie premiere and amateur racing. Four months later, NWS held its first official races in over 14 years, with Chase Elliott winning a PASS event. After holding a one-off PASS race in April 2011, on May 10, McBride announced the second closure of the facility due to a lack of funding. STS, who had worked with McBride Jr. until April, stated that McBride Jr. had "alienated volunteers and the local power structure". Years after the closure, McBride Jr. blamed the local government for the closure, claiming that the city council refused to give him an annual investment that he claims they promised. He stated in Autoweek, "[North Wilkesboro] Mayor [Robert] Johnson was the only guy to have my back when the council started pelting us with their shit. He fought them off just so I could get to work on the track. I can’t say anything bad about the man. It’s just politics. It ruins everything and ruined what we had at North Wilkesboro."

NWS fell into continued disrepair for the rest of the 2010s. An aging Paul Call, the only person who worked at the track, was limited to mowing the grass at the track's property in his efforts to preserve the facility. Call occasionally also let tourists into the facility and acted as a tour guide and storyteller if he was asked while mowing or at his motorhome. However, Call's preservation efforts were insurmountable to the deterioration of NWS; by 2015, buildings on the site had completely caved in, the Junior Johnson grandstands collapsed, and several suites were damaged. In 2017, the track, which was viewed as abandoned and desolate, was paid homage to in the movie Cars 3 when NWS served as the inspirational basis for the fictional Thomasville Speedway. The next year, STS spokesman Steven Wilson stated renewed interest at restoring the facility; chances of it ever happening, however, were viewed as non-likely.

=== Marcus Smith-led revival attempt ===
In September 2019, NASCAR driver Dale Earnhardt Jr. talked to Bruton's successor, Marcus Smith, about the possibility of digitally preserving the facility. A physical renovation, however, was seen as an extreme long-shot due to the track's condition, which had deteriorated so much that writer Jordan Bianchi wrote that "the facility is closer to being condemned than anything else. It would require an investment of hundreds of millions of dollars to bring North Wilkesboro up to par, and that is simply not realistic." Three months later, Earnhardt organized a track cleanup to remove weeds as part of an effort for racing simulator iRacing and its developers to scan the track. The scan was eventually completed and added to the simulator by May 2020. In March 2021, Barry Braun, owner of a racing streaming service, met Marcus and proposed the idea to run dirt races at the facility. Within the month, Marcus stated on a podcast episode of The Dale Jr. Download that he was considering ways to revitalize the facility and that "we haven't given up on it", although "no promises" were made. Two months later, the Wilkes Chamber of Commerce began handing out flyers in support of the track's return to the NASCAR calendar. That same month, Truck Series title sponsor Camping World CEO Marcus Lemonis also pledged a $1 million investment for the track's revival.

That same month, Roy Cooper, the Governor of North Carolina, began considering a COVID-19 relief economic package that would give $10 million to the government of Wilkes County to repair the facility. By August, the amount increased to $20 million. A renewed sense of hope rang through Wilkes County Board of Commissioners, with commissioner Eddie Settle giving an "optimistic" prediction that racing would resume at the facility by July 2022; a major boost to the financially riddled Wilkes County, which had seen most of its economic bloodlines abandon the county in the years following Bruton's purchase of the track. The funding was finalized to be voted on by the North Carolina General Assembly in November, with the final amount totaling to $18 million; the budget proposal passed within the month. Soon after, SMI began construction and the demolition of dilapidated buildings within the facility. Smith unveiled revitalization plans and conceptual drawings in January 2022, stating that there was a "real possibility" of the facility being awarded a NASCAR Camping World Truck Series race weekend.

==== Resumption of major racing ====
On April 16, 2022, Smith announced the resumption of racing at the facility, scheduling two multi-class grassroots events throughout the months of August and October of that year, with the latter event being run on dirt. Within the month, developers added electrical and internet systems, along with demolishing old suites and other general repairs. Racing resumed as scheduled, albeit with limited amenities and infrastructure, on August 2, with an estimated 9,000 people attending the first event. Later events saw increased attendance; however, the dirt October races were cancelled. On September 7, The Athletic reported that NASCAR would move the NASCAR All-Star Race, a NASCAR Cup Series exhibition event, to NWS from Texas Motor Speedway; the track to which Bruton moved one of North Wilkesboro's races. The report was confirmed the next day. More renovation announcements soon followed, including the paving of infield garage, the addition of SAFER barriers and storm drain pipes, and other repairs to amenities were reported. Developers also stated a desire to maintain an old-school aesthetic for the facility. By February 2023, SMI leadership announced that renovations were ahead of schedule.

The track in 2025 after revival.

Tire tests on the reopened facility were run in late March. By May of that year, Ronald Queen was named director of operations. Within the month, the NASCAR Cup Series made its return, running races in late May; the races were the first in 27 years. Six months later, SMI announced the track's first repave since 1981. The repave was completed by March 2024, with tire tests being run in the same month. In 2024, a sinkhole was found beneath a grandstand. It was later alleged as a possible moonshine cave that would have been used in the 1940s; this has been disputed due to NWS' reputation with poor drainage issues before SMI's purchase of the track.

== Events ==
NWS hosts a non-points exhibition event for the NASCAR Cup Series known as the NASCAR All-Star Race. The track also hosts points-paying races for the NASCAR O'Reilly Auto Parts Series known as Coca-Cola 300 and a NASCAR Truck Series race known as the FaithFest 250. NWS formerly hosted two Cup Series points-paying races known as the Window World 450 and Tyson Holly Farms 400.

== Lap records ==
As of May 2024, the fastest official race lap records at North Wilkesboro Speedway are listed as:

| Category | Time | Driver | Vehicle | Event |
Oval (1947–present): 0.625 mi (1.006 km)
| NASCAR Cup | 0:18.362 | Kyle Larson | Chevrolet Camaro ZL1 | 2024 NASCAR All-Star Race |
| NASCAR Truck | 0:18.431 | Corey Heim | Toyota Tundra NASCAR | 2024 Wright Brand 250 |
