= NASCAR Truck Series at Charlotte Motor Speedway =

NASCAR Truck Series races at Charlotte Motor Speedway

NASCAR Truck Series
- Venue: Charlotte Motor Speedway
- Location: Concord, North Carolina, U.S.
- Distance: Length; Oval: 1.5 miles (2.4 km); Road Course: 2.32 miles (3.73 km); Turns; Oval: 4 Road Course: 17

Circuit information
- Surface: Asphalt

Pickup truck racing events in the NASCAR Truck Series have been held annually at Charlotte Motor Speedway in Concord, North Carolina since 2003. Both races are 134 laps and 201 miles (323 km) each.

In 2025, a race was held in the fall on the tracks' modified road course, known as the "Roval". In 2026, the fall race was moved to the oval with the Cup Series and the O'Reilly Auto Parts Series.

== Spring race ==
North Carolina Education Lottery 200
- Corporate sponsor: North Carolina Education Lottery
- First race: 2003
- Distance: 201 miles (323.478 km)
- Laps: 134; Stages 1/2: 30 each Final stage: 74
- Previous names: Hardee's 200 (2003); Infineon 200 (2004); Quaker State & Lube 200 Presented by Click It or Ticket (2005); Quaker State & Lube 200 (2006); Quaker State & Lube 200 Presented by Circle K (2007)
- Most wins (driver): Kyle Busch (8)
- Most wins (team): Kyle Busch Motorsports (7)
- Most wins (manufacturer): Chevrolet (12)

The North Carolina Education Lottery 200 is a NASCAR Truck Series race held in mid-May at Charlotte Motor Speedway in Concord, North Carolina.

Layne Riggs is the defending race winner, having won the event in 2026.

=== History ===
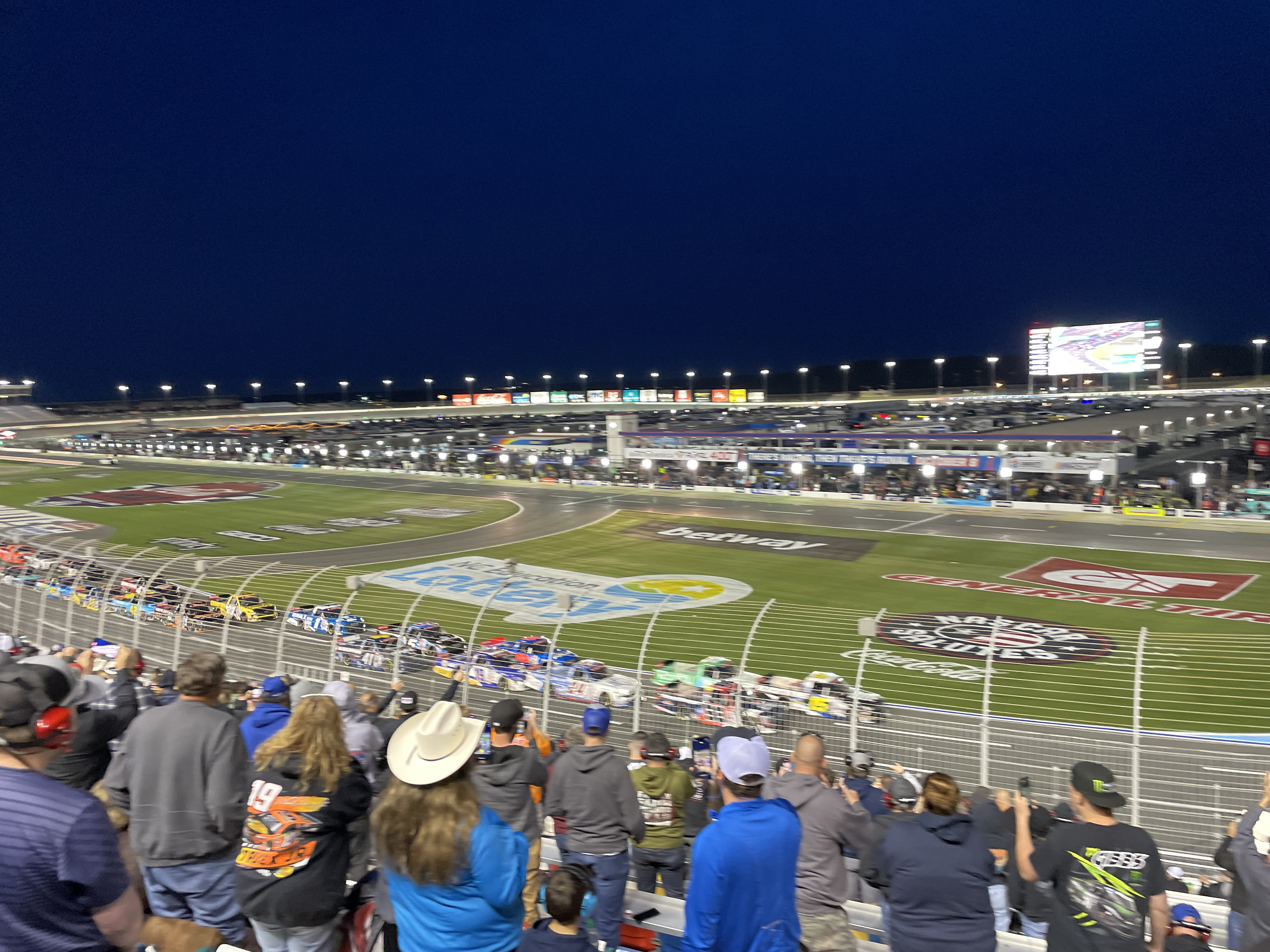
The 2023 North Carolina Education Lottery 200

From the inaugural running in 2003 to 2019, the race was a companion event to the NASCAR All-Star Race in mid-May. Since 2020, it has been the companion event to the Coca-Cola 600.

=== Past winners ===
Year	Date	No.	Driver	Team	Manufacturer	Race Distance		Race Time	Average Speed (mph)	Report	Ref
Year	Date	No.	Driver	Team	Manufacturer	Laps	Miles (km)	Race Time	Average Speed (mph)	Report	Ref
2003	May 16	1	Ted Musgrave	Ultra Motorsports	Dodge	136*	204 (328.306)	1:46:39	114.768	Report	
2004	May 21	46	Dennis Setzer	Morgan-Dollar Motorsports	Chevrolet	134	201 (323.478)	1:52:03	107.631	Report	
2005	May 20	15	Kyle Busch	Billy Ballew Motorsports	Chevrolet	136*	204 (328.306)	1:57:03	104.571	Report	
2006	May 19	51	Kyle Busch	Billy Ballew Motorsports	Chevrolet	134	201 (323.478)	1:36:36	124.845	Report	
2007	May 18	33	Ron Hornaday Jr.	Kevin Harvick Inc.	Chevrolet	136*	204 (328.306)	1:39:40	122.809	Report	
2008	May 16	88	Matt Crafton	ThorSport Racing	Chevrolet	138*	207 (333.134)	1:51:24	111.49	Report	
2009	May 15	33	Ron Hornaday Jr.	Kevin Harvick Inc.	Chevrolet	134	201 (323.478)	1:39:34	121.125	Report	
2010	May 21	18	Kyle Busch	Kyle Busch Motorsports	Toyota	134	201 (323.478)	1:49:59	109.653	Report	
2011	May 20	18	Kyle Busch	Kyle Busch Motorsports	Toyota	134	201 (323.478)	1:58:41	101.615	Report	
2012	May 18	6	Justin Lofton	Eddie Sharp Racing	Chevrolet	134	201 (323.478)	1:49:51	109.786	Report	
2013	May 17	51	Kyle Busch	Kyle Busch Motorsports	Toyota	134	201 (323.478)	1:53:54	105.882	Report	
2014	May 16	51	Kyle Busch	Kyle Busch Motorsports	Toyota	134	201 (323.478)	1:59:54	100.584	Report	
2015	May 15	00	Kasey Kahne	JR Motorsports	Chevrolet	139*	208.5 (335.548)	1:37:01	128.947	Report	
2016	May 21*	88	Matt Crafton	ThorSport Racing	Toyota	134	201 (323.478)	1:25:01	141.855	Report	
2017	May 19	51	Kyle Busch	Kyle Busch Motorsports	Toyota	134	201 (323.478)	1:49:32	110.103	Report	
2018	May 18	21	Johnny Sauter	GMS Racing	Chevrolet	134	201 (323.478)	1:47:02	112.675	Report	
2019	May 17	51	Kyle Busch	Kyle Busch Motorsports	Toyota	134	201 (323.478)	1:44:53	114.985	Report	
2020	May 26*	24	Chase Elliott	GMS Racing	Chevrolet	134	201 (323.478)	1:47:42	111.978	Report	
2021	May 28	4	John Hunter Nemechek	Kyle Busch Motorsports	Toyota	134	201 (323.478)	1:45:29	114.331	Report	
2022	May 27	41	Ross Chastain	Niece Motorsports	Chevrolet	143*	214.5 (345.204)	1:42:17	125.827	Report	
2023	May 26	99	Ben Rhodes	ThorSport Racing	Ford	134	201 (323.478)	1:43:10	116.898	Report	
2024	May 24	2	Nick Sanchez	Rev Racing	Chevrolet	134	201 (323.478)	1:45:40	114.132	Report	
2025	May 23	11	Corey Heim	Tricon Garage	Toyota	134	201 (323.478)	1:33:38	128.8	Report	
2026	May 24* (Note: The race was originally scheduled on Friday, May 22, before being postponed to Saturday, May 23, before ultimately being contested on May 24, the day of the Coca-Cola 600.)	34	Layne Riggs	Front Row Motorsports	Ford	110*	165 (265.542)	1:57:52	83.993	Report	
2027	May 28									Report	

Race Notes

- 2003, 2005, 2007–08, 2015 and 2022: Race extended due to a NASCAR overtime Finish.
- 2016: Race postponed from May 20 to May 21 because of inclement weather.
- 2020: Race postponed from May 15 to May 26 due to the COVID-19 pandemic.
- 2026: Race postponed from May 22 to May 24 because of inclement weather.
- 2026: Race shortened due to adverse conditions rule.

==== Multiple winners (drivers) ====
# Wins	Driver	Years won
8	Kyle Busch	2005–2006, 2010–2011, 2013–2014, 2017, 2019
2	Ron Hornaday Jr.	2007, 2009
2	Matt Crafton	2008, 2016

==== Multiple winners (teams) ====
# Wins	Team	Years won
7	Kyle Busch Motorsports	2010–2011, 2013–2014, 2017, 2019, 2021
3	ThorSport Racing	2008, 2016, 2023
2	Billy Ballew Motorsports	2005–2006
2	Kevin Harvick Inc.	2007, 2009
2	GMS Racing	2018, 2020

==== Manufacturer wins ====
# Wins	Make	Years won
12	(United States) Chevrolet	2004–2009, 2012, 2015, 2018, 2020, 2022, 2024
9	(Japan) Toyota	2010–2011, 2013–2014, 2016–2017, 2019, 2021, 2025
2	(United States) Ford	2023, 2026
1	(United States) Dodge	2003

== Fall race (oval) ==
Ecosave 200
- Corporate sponsor: Ecosave
- First race: 2026
- Distance: 201 miles (323.478 km)
- Laps: 134; Stage 1/2: 30 each Stage 3: 74
- Most wins (driver): Layne Riggs (1)
- Most wins (team): Front Row Motorsports (1)
- Most wins (manufacturer): Ford (1)

The Ecosave 200 is a NASCAR Truck Series race held in early-October at Charlotte Motor Speedway in Concord, North Carolina.

Layne Riggs is the defending race winner, having won the event in 2026.

=== History ===
On February 3, 2026, it was announced that the fall Charlotte races would be moved to the oval from the road course. Ecosave was announced as the entitlement sponsor, also revealing the distance for the race, being the same as the spring race.

=== Past winners ===
Year	Date	No.	Driver	Team	Manufacturer	Race Distance		Race Time	Average Speed (mph)	Report	Ref
Year	Date	No.	Driver	Team	Manufacturer	Laps	Miles (km)	Race Time	Average Speed (mph)	Report	Ref
2026	October 9	34	Layne Riggs	Front Row Motorsports	Ford	134	201 (323.478)	1:43:15	116.804	Report	
2027	October 15									Report	

== Former Fall race (ROVAL) ==
Ecosave 250
- Corporate sponsor: Ecosave
- First race: 2025
- Last race: 2025
- Distance: 152.76 miles (245.84 km)
- Laps: 67; Stages 1/2: 20 each Final stage: 27
- Most wins (driver): Corey Heim (1)
- Most wins (team): Tricon Garage (1)
- Most wins (manufacturer): Toyota (1)

The Ecosave 250 was a NASCAR Truck Series race held in mid-October at the Charlotte Motor Speedway Road Course configuration in Concord, North Carolina.

Corey Heim is the final race winner, having won the event in 2025.

=== History ===
On August 29, 2024, the 2025 schedule released announcing a race at the Charlotte Motor Speedway road course.

On October 1, 2025, Ecosave was announced as the entitlement sponsor, also revealing the distance for the race, being the same as the Xfinity Series race the following day.

=== Past winners ===
Year	Date	No.	Driver	Team	Manufacturer	Race Distance		Race Time	Average Speed (mph)	Report	Ref
Year	Date	No.	Driver	Team	Manufacturer	Laps	Miles (km)	Race Time	Average Speed (mph)	Report	Ref
2025	October 3	11	Corey Heim	Tricon Garage	Toyota	70*	159.6 (256.847)	2:07:16	75.244	Report	

- 2025: Race extended due to NASCAR overtime.

Previous race: FaithFest 250	NASCAR Craftsman Truck Series; North Carolina Education Lottery 200	Next race: Allegience 200

Previous race: RaceToStopSuicide.com 200	NASCAR Craftsman Truck Series; Ecosave 200	Next race: Zero Carbon Bioethanol 150
