= 1996 AC Delco 400 =

29th race of the 1996 NASCAR Winston Cup Series

Race details
- Race 29 of 31 in the 1996 NASCAR Winston Cup Series
- The 1996 AC Delco 400 program cover.
- Date: October 20, 1996
- Official name: 32nd Annual AC Delco 400
- Location: Rockingham, North Carolina, Rockingham Speedway
- Course: Permanent racing facility
- Course length: 1.017 miles (1.636 km)
- Distance: 393 laps, 399.681 mi (643.224 km)
- Average speed: 121.73 miles per hour (195.91 km/h)

Pole position
Driver	Dale Jarrett	Robert Yates Racing
- Time: 23.291

Most laps led
Driver	Dale Jarrett	Robert Yates Racing
- Laps: 207

Winner
No. 10	Ricky Rudd	Rudd Performance Motorsports

Television in the United States
- Network: TNN
- Announcers: Eli Gold, Buddy Baker, Dick Berggren

Radio in the United States
- Radio: Motor Racing Network

The 1996 AC Delco 400 was the 29th stock car race of the 1996 NASCAR Winston Cup Series and the 32nd iteration of the event. The race was held on Sunday, October 20, 1996, in Rockingham, North Carolina, at Rockingham Speedway, a 1.017 miles (1.637 km) permanent high-banked racetrack. The race took the scheduled 393 laps to complete. At race's end, Ricky Rudd, driving for his own Rudd Performance Motorsports team, would manage to dominate the late stages of the race to take his 17th career NASCAR Winston Cup Series victory and his only victory of the season. Meanwhile, third-place finisher, Hendrick Motorsports driver Terry Labonte, would manage to overtake the points lead from teammate Jeff Gordon, leading Gordon by 32 points. To fill out the top three, Robert Yates Racing driver Dale Jarrett would finish second.

== Background ==
The layout of Rockingham Speedway, the venue where the race was held.

Rockingham Speedway was opened as a flat, one-mile oval on October 31, 1965. In 1969, the track was extensively reconfigured to a high-banked, D-shaped oval just over one mile in length. In 1997, North Carolina Motor Speedway merged with Penske Motorsports, and was renamed North Carolina Speedway. Shortly thereafter, the infield was reconfigured, and competition on the infield road course, mostly by the SCCA, was discontinued. Currently, the track is home to the Fast Track High Performance Driving School.

=== Entry list ===
- (R) denotes rookie driver.

#	Driver	Team	Make
1	Rick Mast	Precision Products Racing	Pontiac
2	Rusty Wallace	Penske Racing South	Ford
3	Dale Earnhardt	Richard Childress Racing	Chevrolet
4	Sterling Marlin	Morgan–McClure Motorsports	Chevrolet
5	Terry Labonte	Hendrick Motorsports	Chevrolet
6	Mark Martin	Roush Racing	Ford
7	Geoff Bodine	Geoff Bodine Racing	Ford
8	Hut Stricklin	Stavola Brothers Racing	Ford
9	Lake Speed	Melling Racing	Ford
10	Ricky Rudd	Rudd Performance Motorsports	Ford
11	Brett Bodine	Brett Bodine Racing	Ford
12	Derrike Cope	Bobby Allison Motorsports	Ford
15	Wally Dallenbach Jr.	Bud Moore Engineering	Ford
16	Ted Musgrave	Roush Racing	Ford
17	Darrell Waltrip	Darrell Waltrip Motorsports	Chevrolet
18	Bobby Labonte	Joe Gibbs Racing	Chevrolet
21	Michael Waltrip	Wood Brothers Racing	Ford
22	Ward Burton	Bill Davis Racing	Pontiac
23	Jimmy Spencer	Haas-Carter Motorsports	Ford
24	Jeff Gordon	Hendrick Motorsports	Chevrolet
25	Ken Schrader	Hendrick Motorsports	Chevrolet
28	Ernie Irvan	Robert Yates Racing	Ford
29	Robert Pressley	Diamond Ridge Motorsports	Chevrolet
30	Johnny Benson Jr. (R)	Bahari Racing	Pontiac
33	Todd Bodine	Andy Petree Racing	Chevrolet
37	Jeremy Mayfield	Kranefuss-Haas Racing	Ford
40	Robby Gordon	Team SABCO	Chevrolet
41	Ricky Craven	Larry Hedrick Motorsports	Chevrolet
42	Kyle Petty	Team SABCO	Pontiac
43	Bobby Hamilton	Petty Enterprises	Pontiac
60	Ed Berrier	Berrier Racing	Ford
71	Dave Marcis	Marcis Auto Racing	Chevrolet
75	Morgan Shepherd	Butch Mock Motorsports	Ford
77	Bobby Hillin Jr.	Jasper Motorsports	Ford
78	Billy Standridge	Triad Motorsports	Ford
79	Norm Benning	T.R.I.X. Racing	Pontiac
81	Kenny Wallace	FILMAR Racing	Ford
82	Terry Byers	Byers Racing	Chevrolet
87	Joe Nemechek	NEMCO Motorsports	Chevrolet
88	Dale Jarrett	Robert Yates Racing	Ford
90	Dick Trickle	Donlavey Racing	Ford
94	Bill Elliott	Bill Elliott Racing	Ford
95	Gary Bradberry	Sadler Brothers Racing	Ford
98	Jeremy Mayfield	Cale Yarborough Motorsports	Ford
99	Jeff Burton	Roush Racing	Ford

== Qualifying ==
Qualifying was split into two rounds. The first round was held on Friday, October 18, at 2:00 PM EST. Each driver would have one lap to set a time. During the first round, the top 25 drivers in the round would be guaranteed a starting spot in the race. If a driver was not able to guarantee a spot in the first round, they had the option to scrub their time from the first round and try and run a faster lap time in a second round qualifying run, held on Saturday, October 19, at 9:30 AM EST. As with the first round, each driver would have one lap to set a time. For this specific race, positions 26-32 would be decided on time, and depending on who needed it, a select amount of positions were given to cars who had not otherwise qualified but were high enough in owner's points.

Dale Jarrett, driving for Robert Yates Racing, would win the pole, setting a time of 23.291 and an average speed of 157.194 miles per hour (252.979 km/h).

Three drivers would fail to qualify: Ed Berrier, Norm Benning, and Terry Byers.

=== Full qualifying results ===
Pos.	#	Driver	Team	Make	Time	Speed
1	88	Dale Jarrett	Robert Yates Racing	Ford	23.291	157.194
2	10	Ricky Rudd	Rudd Performance Motorsports	Ford	23.367	156.683
3	24	Jeff Gordon	Hendrick Motorsports	Chevrolet	23.399	156.468
4	6	Mark Martin	Roush Racing	Ford	23.411	156.388
5	18	Bobby Labonte	Joe Gibbs Racing	Chevrolet	23.472	155.982
6	98	John Andretti	Cale Yarborough Motorsports	Ford	23.480	155.928
7	40	Robby Gordon	Team SABCO	Chevrolet	23.492	155.849
8	81	Kenny Wallace	FILMAR Racing	Ford	23.536	155.557
9	16	Ted Musgrave	Roush Racing	Ford	23.538	155.544
10	33	Todd Bodine	Andy Petree Racing	Chevrolet	23.551	155.458
11	42	Kyle Petty	Team SABCO	Pontiac	23.560	155.399
12	8	Hut Stricklin	Stavola Brothers Racing	Ford	23.584	155.241
13	7	Geoff Bodine	Geoff Bodine Racing	Ford	23.592	155.188
14	23	Jimmy Spencer	Travis Carter Enterprises	Ford	23.601	155.129
15	3	Dale Earnhardt	Richard Childress Racing	Chevrolet	23.602	155.122
16	94	Bill Elliott	Bill Elliott Racing	Ford	23.602	155.122
17	11	Brett Bodine	Brett Bodine Racing	Ford	23.604	155.109
18	1	Rick Mast	Precision Products Racing	Pontiac	23.614	155.044
19	5	Terry Labonte	Hendrick Motorsports	Chevrolet	23.633	154.919
20	28	Ernie Irvan	Robert Yates Racing	Ford	23.640	154.873
21	90	Dick Trickle	Donlavey Racing	Ford	23.651	154.801
22	99	Jeff Burton	Roush Racing	Ford	23.652	154.795
23	9	Lake Speed	Melling Racing	Ford	23.659	154.749
24	17	Darrell Waltrip	Darrell Waltrip Motorsports	Chevrolet	23.691	154.540
25	2	Rusty Wallace	Penske Racing South	Ford	23.693	154.527
Failed to lock in Round 1
26	43	Bobby Hamilton	Petty Enterprises	Pontiac	23.601	155.129
27	12	Derrike Cope	Bobby Allison Motorsports	Ford	23.637	154.893
28	4	Sterling Marlin	Morgan–McClure Motorsports	Chevrolet	23.677	154.631
29	41	Ricky Craven	Larry Hedrick Motorsports	Chevrolet	23.693	154.527
30	29	Robert Pressley	Diamond Ridge Motorsports	Chevrolet	23.731	154.279
31	25	Ken Schrader	Hendrick Motorsports	Chevrolet	23.735	154.253
32	95	Gary Bradberry	Sadler Brothers Racing	Ford	23.766	154.052
33	37	Jeremy Mayfield	Kranefuss-Haas Racing	Ford	23.771	154.020
34	21	Michael Waltrip	Wood Brothers Racing	Ford	23.772	154.013
35	78	Billy Standridge	Triad Motorsports	Ford	23.830	153.638
36	15	Wally Dallenbach Jr.	Bud Moore Engineering	Ford	23.836	153.600
37	71	Dave Marcis	Marcis Auto Racing	Chevrolet	23.869	153.387
38	30	Johnny Benson Jr. (R)	Bahari Racing	Pontiac	23.887	153.272
Provisionals
39	75	Morgan Shepherd	Butch Mock Motorsports	Ford	-*	-*
40	87	Joe Nemechek	NEMCO Motorsports	Chevrolet	-*	-*
41	22	Ward Burton	Bill Davis Racing	Pontiac	-*	-*
42	77	Bobby Hillin Jr.	Jasper Motorsports	Ford	-*	-*
Failed to qualify
43	60	Ed Berrier	Berrier Racing	Ford	-*	-*
44	79	Norm Benning	T.R.I.X. Racing	Pontiac	-*	-*
45	82	Terry Byers	Byers Racing	Chevrolet	-*	-*
Official first round qualifying results
Official starting lineup

== Race results ==
Fin	St	#	Driver	Team	Make	Laps	Led	Status	Pts	Winnings
1	2	10	Ricky Rudd	Rudd Performance Motorsports	Ford	393	81	running	180	$90,025
2	1	88	Dale Jarrett	Robert Yates Racing	Ford	393	207	running	180	$62,125
3	19	5	Terry Labonte	Hendrick Motorsports	Chevrolet	393	0	running	165	$46,725
4	20	28	Ernie Irvan	Robert Yates Racing	Ford	393	47	running	165	$35,950
5	22	99	Jeff Burton	Roush Racing	Ford	393	14	running	160	$25,675
6	5	18	Bobby Labonte	Joe Gibbs Racing	Chevrolet	393	1	running	155	$33,300
7	4	6	Mark Martin	Roush Racing	Ford	393	0	running	146	$31,100
8	25	2	Rusty Wallace	Penske Racing South	Ford	393	0	running	142	$28,900
9	15	3	Dale Earnhardt	Richard Childress Racing	Chevrolet	393	37	running	143	$30,700
10	14	23	Jimmy Spencer	Travis Carter Enterprises	Ford	393	0	running	134	$28,100
11	12	8	Hut Stricklin	Stavola Brothers Racing	Ford	393	0	running	130	$17,400
12	3	24	Jeff Gordon	Hendrick Motorsports	Chevrolet	392	1	running	132	$35,000
13	28	4	Sterling Marlin	Morgan–McClure Motorsports	Chevrolet	392	0	running	124	$29,150
14	34	21	Michael Waltrip	Wood Brothers Racing	Ford	392	1	running	126	$23,700
15	13	7	Geoff Bodine	Geoff Bodine Racing	Ford	392	0	running	118	$28,200
16	17	11	Brett Bodine	Brett Bodine Racing	Ford	392	0	running	115	$23,200
17	41	22	Ward Burton	Bill Davis Racing	Pontiac	391	0	running	112	$29,200
18	9	16	Ted Musgrave	Roush Racing	Ford	391	0	running	109	$22,700
19	8	81	Kenny Wallace	FILMAR Racing	Ford	391	0	running	106	$15,400
20	10	33	Todd Bodine	Andy Petree Racing	Chevrolet	390	0	running	103	$25,850
21	24	17	Darrell Waltrip	Darrell Waltrip Motorsports	Chevrolet	390	0	running	100	$21,525
22	29	41	Ricky Craven	Larry Hedrick Motorsports	Chevrolet	390	0	running	97	$21,325
23	31	25	Ken Schrader	Hendrick Motorsports	Chevrolet	390	0	running	94	$21,125
24	40	87	Joe Nemechek	NEMCO Motorsports	Chevrolet	389	0	running	91	$20,925
25	11	42	Kyle Petty	Team SABCO	Pontiac	389	0	running	88	$20,925
26	6	98	John Andretti	Cale Yarborough Motorsports	Ford	387	1	running	90	$13,525
27	32	95	Gary Bradberry	Sadler Brothers Racing	Ford	387	0	running	82	$10,125
28	26	43	Bobby Hamilton	Petty Enterprises	Pontiac	386	0	running	79	$20,225
29	39	75	Morgan Shepherd	Butch Mock Motorsports	Ford	385	0	running	76	$13,025
30	37	71	Dave Marcis	Marcis Auto Racing	Chevrolet	377	0	running	73	$12,825
31	21	90	Dick Trickle	Donlavey Racing	Ford	353	0	running	70	$12,600
32	16	94	Bill Elliott	Bill Elliott Racing	Ford	326	0	handling	67	$19,000
33	42	77	Bobby Hillin Jr.	Jasper Motorsports	Ford	311	0	water pump	64	$9,400
34	33	37	Jeremy Mayfield	Kranefuss-Haas Racing	Ford	311	0	crash	61	$16,300
35	23	9	Lake Speed	Melling Racing	Ford	305	0	crash	58	$16,200
36	36	15	Wally Dallenbach Jr.	Bud Moore Engineering	Ford	303	0	crash	55	$16,175
37	30	29	Robert Pressley	Diamond Ridge Motorsports	Chevrolet	294	0	engine	52	$16,175
38	18	1	Rick Mast	Precision Products Racing	Pontiac	281	0	crash	49	$16,100
39	27	12	Derrike Cope	Bobby Allison Motorsports	Ford	267	3	crash	51	$17,675
40	38	30	Johnny Benson Jr. (R)	Bahari Racing	Pontiac	225	0	crash	43	$17,100
41	35	78	Billy Standridge	Triad Motorsports	Ford	140	0	handling	40	$9,100
42	7	40	Robby Gordon	Team SABCO	Chevrolet	4	0	crash	37	$9,100
Official race results

Previous race: 1996 UAW-GM Quality 500	NASCAR Winston Cup Series; 1996 season	Next race: 1996 Dura Lube 500
