= New Hampshire Motor Speedway =

Motorsport track in the United States

The Magic Mile

- Oval (1990–present)
- Location: 1122 North New Hampshire Route 106; Loudon, New Hampshire, United States; 03307
- Coordinates: 43°21′44.14″N 71°27′40.5″W
- Capacity: 44,000
- Owner: Speedway Motorsports (November 2007–present)
- Broke ground: August 13, 1989; 37 years ago (as New Hampshire Motor Speedway)
- Opened: June 17, 1965; 61 years ago (as Bryar Motorsports Park); June 15, 1990; 36 years ago (as New Hampshire Motor Speedway)
- Former names: New Hampshire International Speedway (1989–2007); Bryar Motorsports Park (1965–1989); 106 Midway Raceway (1961–1964)
- Major events: Current: NASCAR Cup Series; Dollar Tree 301 (1993–present); ISM Connect 300 (1997–2017); NASCAR Truck Series; Team EJP 175 (1996–2011, 2014–2017, 2025–present); NASCAR Whelen Modified Tour; Mohegan Sun 100 (1990–present); Loudon Classic (1965–present); Former: NASCAR Xfinity Series; SciAps 200 (1990–2019, 2021–2024); IndyCar Series; New Hampshire Indy 225 (1992–1998, 2011); NASCAR K&N Pro Series East; Apple Barrel 125 (1990–2019); NASCAR Canada Series (2018–2019); AMA Superbike Championship (1976–2001); Trans-Am (1966–1972); IMSA GT (1972)
- Website: nhms.com

Oval (1990–present)
- Surface: Asphalt
- Length: 1.058 mi (1.703 km)
- Turns: 4
- Banking: Turns: 2–7° Straights: 1°
- Race lap record: 0:22.3481 ( (New Zealand) Scott Dixon, Dallara IR-05, 2011, IndyCar)

New Hampshire Road Course (1990–present)
- Length: 1.600 mi (2.575 km)
- Turns: 16

Bryar Motorsports Park Road Course (1965–1989)
- Length: 1.600 mi (2.575 km)
- Turns: 9
- Race lap record: 1:12.100 ( (United States) George Follmer, Ford Mustang Boss 302, 1971, Trans-Am (TO))

New Hampshire Motor Speedway (formerly known as New Hampshire International Speedway from 1989 to 2007, Bryar Motorsports Park from 1965 to 1989, and as 106 Midway Raceway from 1961 to 1964) is a 1.058 mi (1.703 km) oval track in Loudon, New Hampshire, United States. It has hosted various major races throughout its existence, including NASCAR, IndyCar, modified races, and the Loudon Classic. The venue has a capacity of 44,000 as of 2024. New Hampshire Motor Speedway is currently owned by Speedway Motorsports, LLC (SMI) and is led by track general manager David McGrath.

Initially opening as a 0.250 mi (0.402 km) dirt oval in 1961 under the control of Keith Bryar, the motorsports complex was formed four years later after Bryar built a road course to host major motorcycle races. In 1989, Maine businessman Bob Bahre bought out the facility from Bryar, completely reconfigurating the complex in efforts to host major series. Within the first years of Bahre's ownership, major racing series, including the NASCAR and Championship Auto Racing Teams (CART) came to the facility. The venue underwent significant expansion under Bahre's ownership, with numerous seating additions being added in the 1990s. After a turbulent early 2000s that saw the highly publicized deaths of two NASCAR drivers that raised concerns over the track's safety, numerous safety additions and modifications were made to the track. In 2007, the facility was bought out by SMI. In recent years, the venue has overseen major downsizing in capacity, shrinking to less than half of its peak.

== Description ==
=== Configuration ===
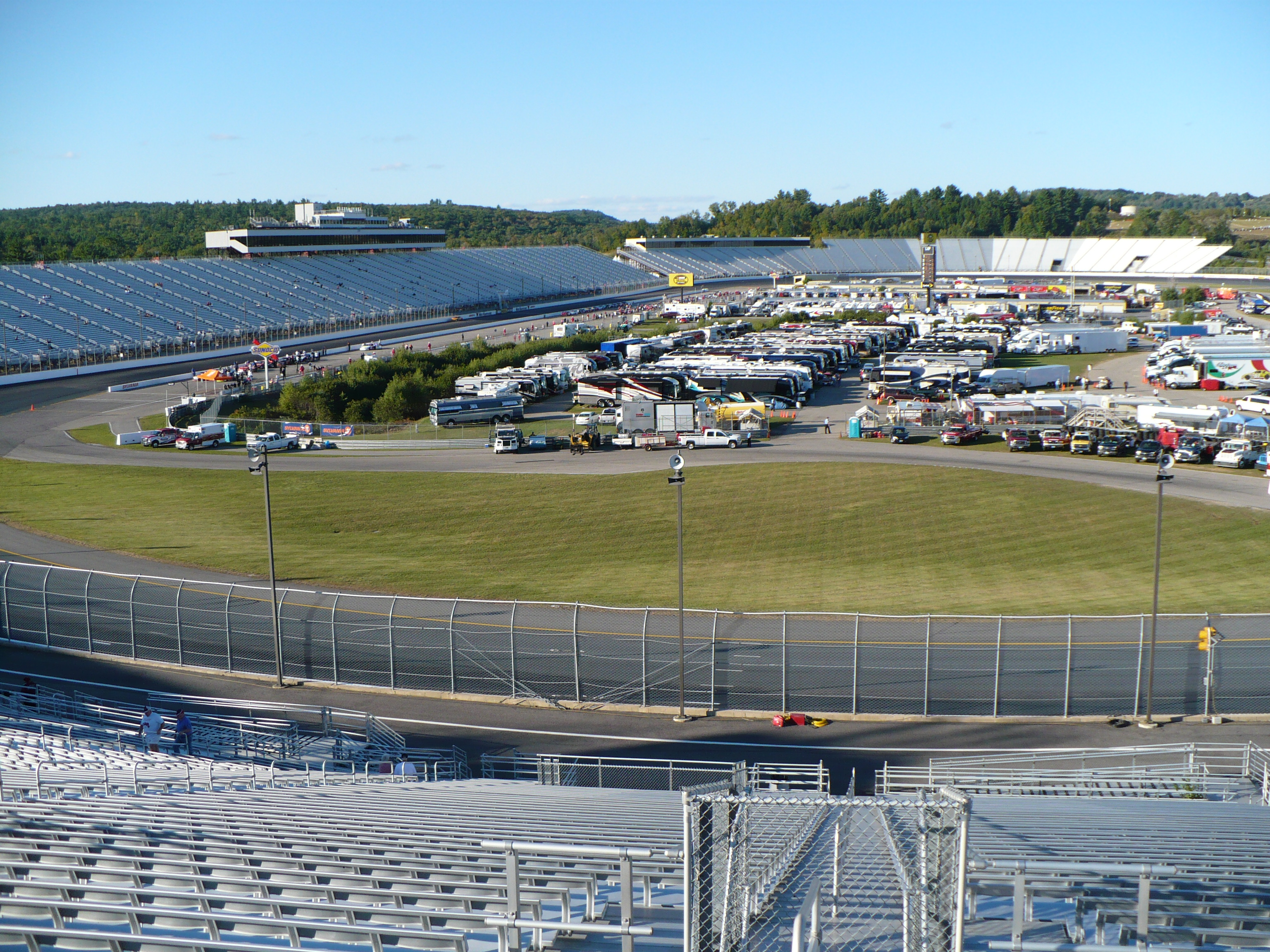
The New Hampshire Motor Speedway pictured in 2007.

New Hampshire Motor Speedway (NHMS) in its current form is measured at 1.058 miles (1.703 km), with a progressive banking system of 2–7° in the turns and 1° of banking in the straights. Disputes over the track's length exist from varying sanctioning bodies; NASCAR uses a distance of 1.058 miles (1.703 km) while the IndyCar Series used a distance of 1.025 miles (1.650 km). Alongside the main oval, the venue also features a 1.600 mi (2.575 km), 12-turn road course layout used primarily for motorcycle racing that combines parts of the oval track with specialized road course portions.

=== Amenities ===
New Hampshire Motor Speedway is located in Loudon, New Hampshire, and is served by New Hampshire Route 106. As of 2024, the track has a capacity of 44,000 according to NASCAR.

== Track history ==
=== 106 Midway Raceway and Bryar Motorsports Park years ===
In 1961, the Keith Bryar-owned 106 Midway Raceway (the name originating from its location adjacent to NH 106) opened to the public, hosting various types of races, including go-karts, midgets, and stock cars on a 0.250 mi (0.402 km) dirt oval. The track was described by the Concord Monitor's Jim Nebsett as "dirt track capped with layers of cement-hard clay... and is macadam. When the track is wet the clay is slick and acts like tires much like driving on ice." In June 1964, the Monitor reported that Bryar was in negotiations to build a $300,000 (adjusted for inflation, $3,114,270) road course to host motorcycle races as part of an auto racing complex with the present 106 Midway Raceway. A contract for the facility to host the Laconia Classic (now called the Loudon Classic), a motorcycle competition, was signed in September of that year. The 5,000-seat, 10-turn, 1.600 mi (2.575 km) track named Bryar Motorsports Park was completed by June 1965, with Bryar stating hopes for expanding the complex to include a 1.000 mi (1.609 km) oval and a 1.000 mi (1.609 km) dragstrip. The venue held its first race on June 17, with Herb Kresge winning the first major event at the venue. The first Loudon Classic held at the complex was held four days later, with Ralph White winning the event.

By July 1966, a 0.125 mi (0.201 km) drag strip and a motorcycle oval were constructed at the facility according to The Portsmouth Herald. In 1971, the venue underwent a series of renovations, including the doubling of its seating capacity to include 9,000 grandstand seats. The facility fell into financial troubles starting in the early 1970s; in 1972, with the Trans-Am Series leaving the venue off for its following season, Bryar admitted to the Monitor that the races run at the facility made "just barely enough to cover expenses". In addition, the Laconia Classic gained a notorious reputation for frequent violence caused by the event's campers, including shootings and stabbings. In 1974, with the Laconia Classic planned to be cancelled for the following year, Bryar stated to the Monitor that he did not make needed improvements to the facility due to financial troubles and increasing debts, leading to considerations of shutting down the complex. The decision to cancel the 1975 Laconia Classic was later reversed to help maintain financial payments. After banning roadside camping, the following year's Laconia Classic was the complex's "most successful and most profitable event" in the history of the complex at that point, helping reverse its financial woes. In the following years, numerous racing-related fatalities occurred at the complex: Charles Coy in 1979, Linda King in 1980, and John Dranginis in 1983 were all killed in accidents at the facility.

=== Bob Bahre era ===
==== Purchase, complete reconfiguration of complex ====
On December 15, 1988, the Loudon Planning Board unanimously approved a renovation project to lengthen the inner oval track to 1.000 mi (1.609 km) and expand seating capacity to 55,000, with Bryar reportedly collaborating with former Oxford Plains Speedway owner Bob Bahre in order to fund the project according to the Monitor. Bahre's involvement was confirmed five days later, with him buying out the venue from Bryar for $950,000 (adjusted for inflation, $2,586,171). With his purchase, Bahre stated hopes of hosting future national series events, including NASCAR Cup Series and Championship Auto Racing Teams (CART) events. The project quickly faced opposition from local environmental groups, and after a January 13 inspection conducted by the New Hampshire Department of Environmental Services found numerous environmental violations, a lawsuit was filed by Concerned Racetrack Neighbors in response to the project's fast-paced approval from the planning board, halting all construction. A settlement was eventually agreed to in May for the now-named New Hampshire International Speedway (NHIS) after Bahre personally met several members of the group at a local New Hampshire restaurant to negotiate a deal in the month prior.

A groundbreaking ceremony occurred on August 13, 1989, according to The Boston Globe. Although an initial opening date was set in October 1989, numerous factors, including the slow construction of grandstands and the discovery of a 12 ft (3.7 m) shale, delayed its opening by months. By December, plans for NHIS had expanded to include 59,000 seats. That same month, NASCAR agreed to host Busch Series (now named the O'Reilly Auto Parts Series) races at the venue for its 1990 season. The first tire tests for NHIS were conducted on June 5, 1990, with Busch Series driver Tommy Houston and New Hampshire Governor Judd Gregg participating in the session. By the end of its construction, the venue had a construction cost of $25 million according to The Globe. However, according to Bahre, he himself did not know the true cost of the venue, stating in the Winston-Salem Journal, "I don't know what the hell it costs. I was in Maine most of the time they were building it, and all I know is [my son] Gary would call me and say 'Dad, we need another million.' I never counted 'em."

==== NHIS years ====
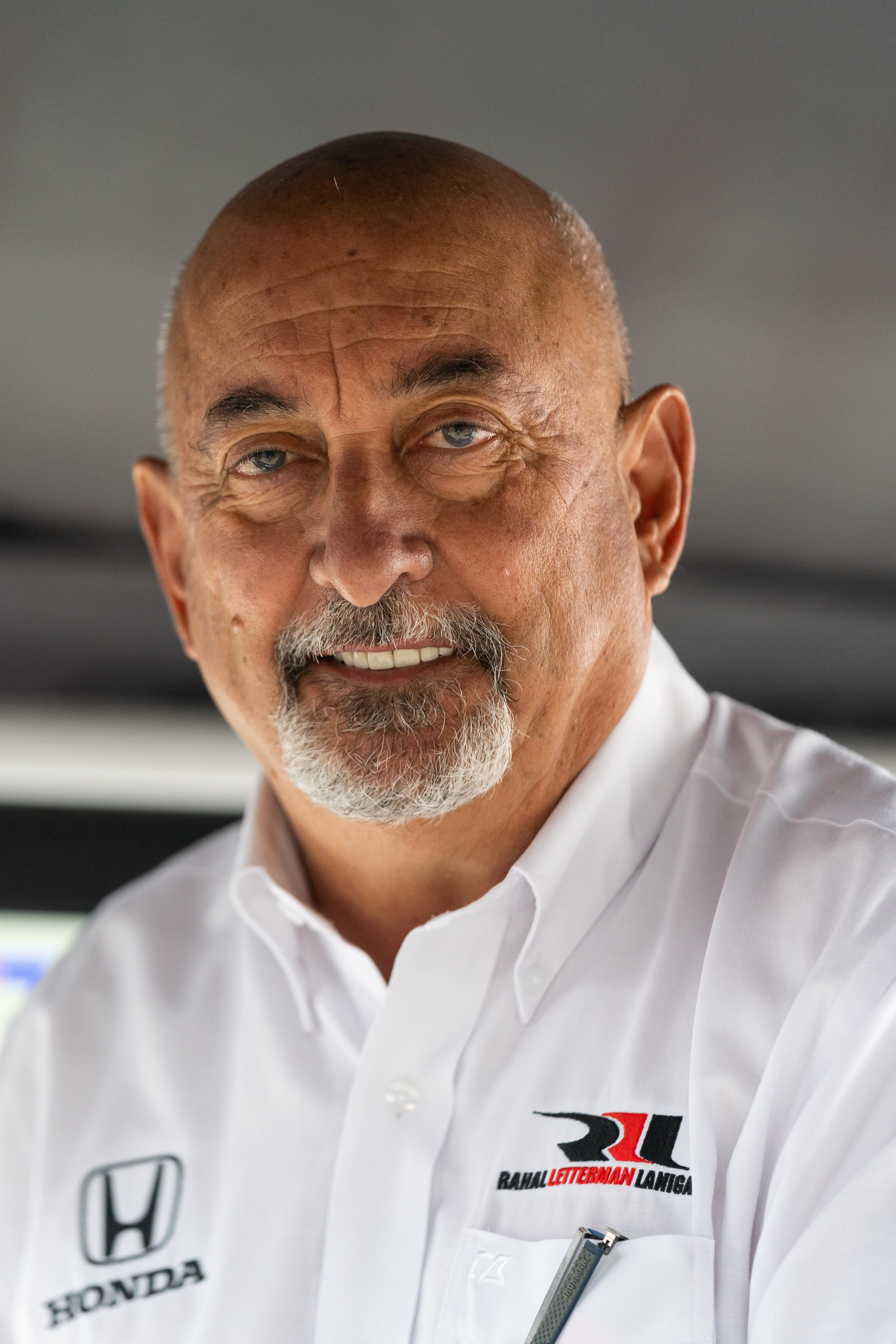
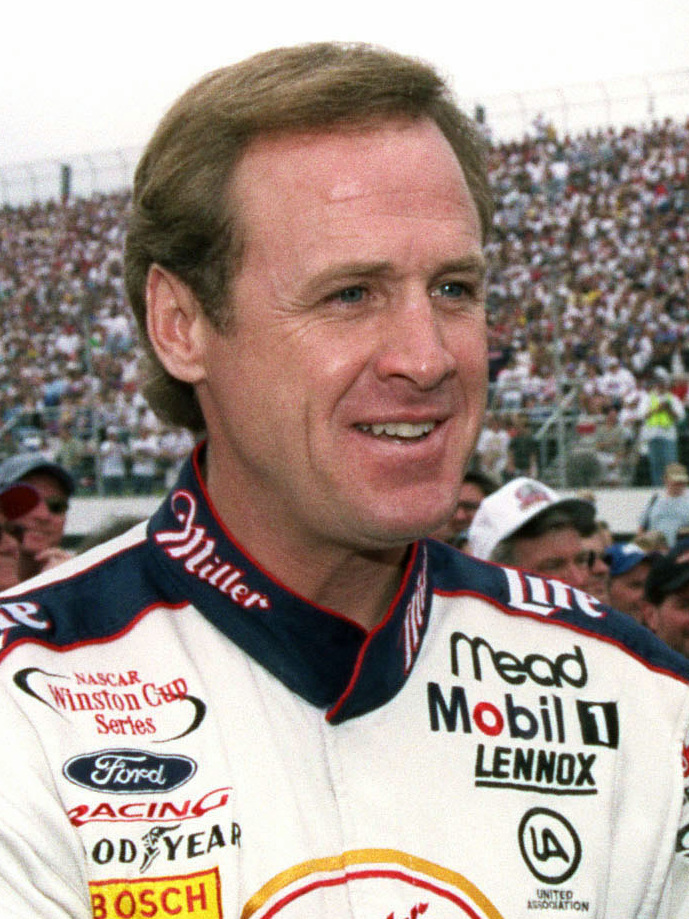
Drivers Bobby Rahal (left) and Rusty Wallace won the first CART and NASCAR Cup Series events at the facility in 1992 and 1993, respectively.

NHIS' road course officially opened on June 15, 1990, for the start of that year's Loudon Classic weekend. The road course received consistent negative reception from motorcycle racers, who found the track to be too dangerous due to a lack of run-off areas. The oval track's first race took place a month later, with Tommy Ellis winning a Busch Series race. A year later, the facility was able to obtain its first major race, with CART scheduling a race for its 1992 season; it took place on July 5, with Bobby Rahal winning the event. In October of that year, NHIS' first fatality occurred during a go-kart race when Fred Clarke spun after spinning "violently" at "nearly 80 mph". Later that same month, track officials announced the scheduling of a Cup Series race for its 1993 season, completing Bahre's goal of obtaining both Cup Series and CART races within the span of less than four years. In preparation for the Cup Series race, numerous additions were made to the facility, including 4,000 seats, 20 VIP box suites, and increased parking and concessions. The venue's first Cup Series race was held on July 11, with Rusty Wallace winning the event.

In 1994, numerous renovations were made to the facility after track officials successfully lobbied for the removal of 8 acres (3.2 ha) of wetlands within the oval track's infield, including the construction of two 52-car garages, a modernized media center, and a daycare center alongside the addition of 6,000 seats to the venue's grandstands. After numerous complaints of a deteriorating track surface in the 1994 Slick 50 300, the track was repaved during the winter of 1994 and completed in time for next year's Slick 50 300. Along with the repave, 4,000 more seats were added. In 1996, after Bahre purchased half interest in the North Wilkesboro Speedway, NHIS was able to receive one of North Wilkesboro's two dates for the Cup Series starting in 1997. In response, Bahre planned a 4,000-seat grandstand to expand capacity to 76,000; by the time it was completed in July 1997, capacity was at 80,000 according to The Globe. Another 13,000-seat expansion was planned for the 1998 season and was approved by the Loudon Planning Board; however, after 4,000 seats were added, the expansion was temporarily stopped after residents from Canterbury appealed the decision in February 1998, claiming that the board failed to realize whether or not the expansion would have "regional impact" towards nearby towns. The following year, construction was fully approved after a study conducted by Acentech found that the expansion would not increase noise in surrounding towns. The expansion was completed by 2001 after a lawsuit temporarily delayed it further, increasing capacity to 91,000.

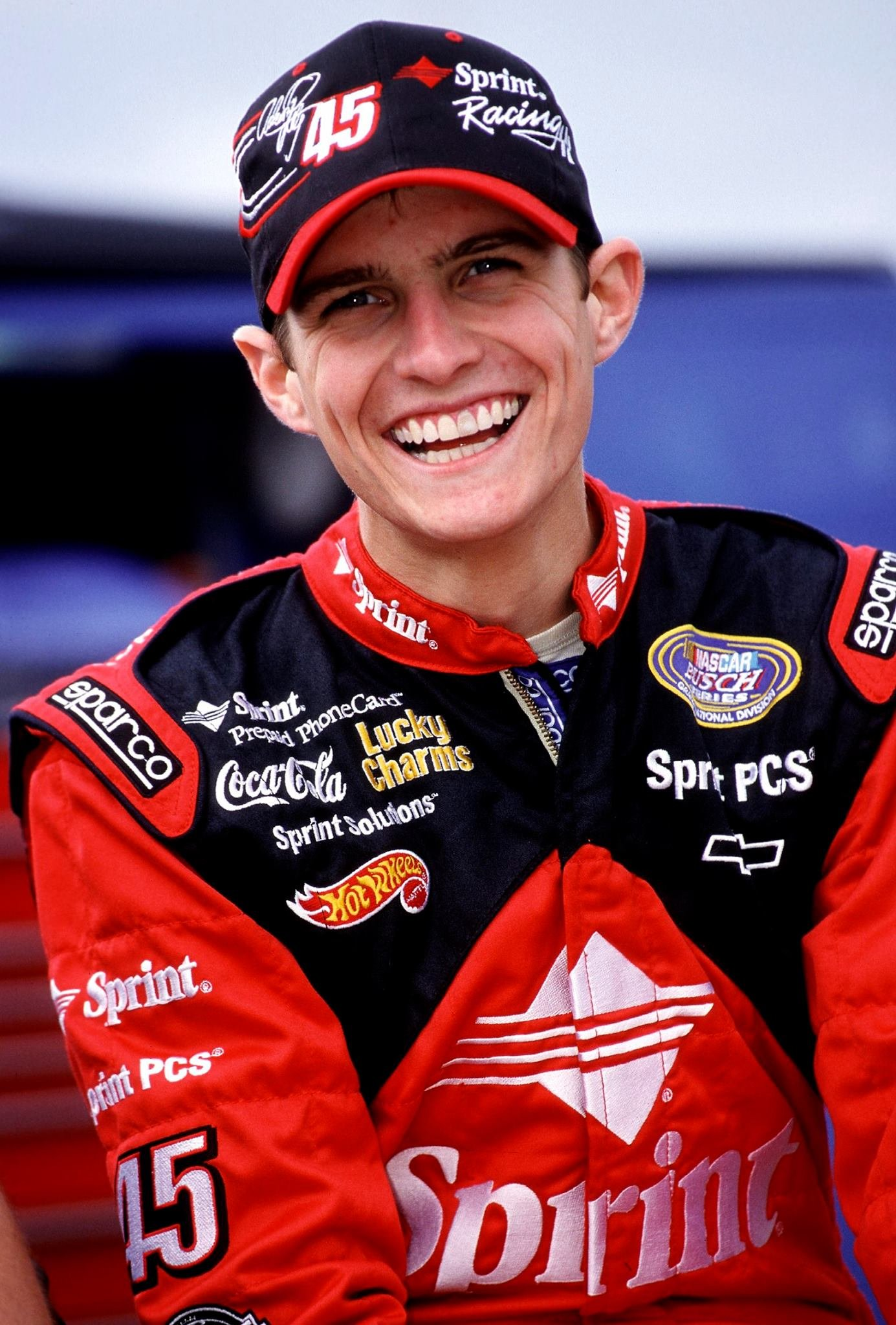
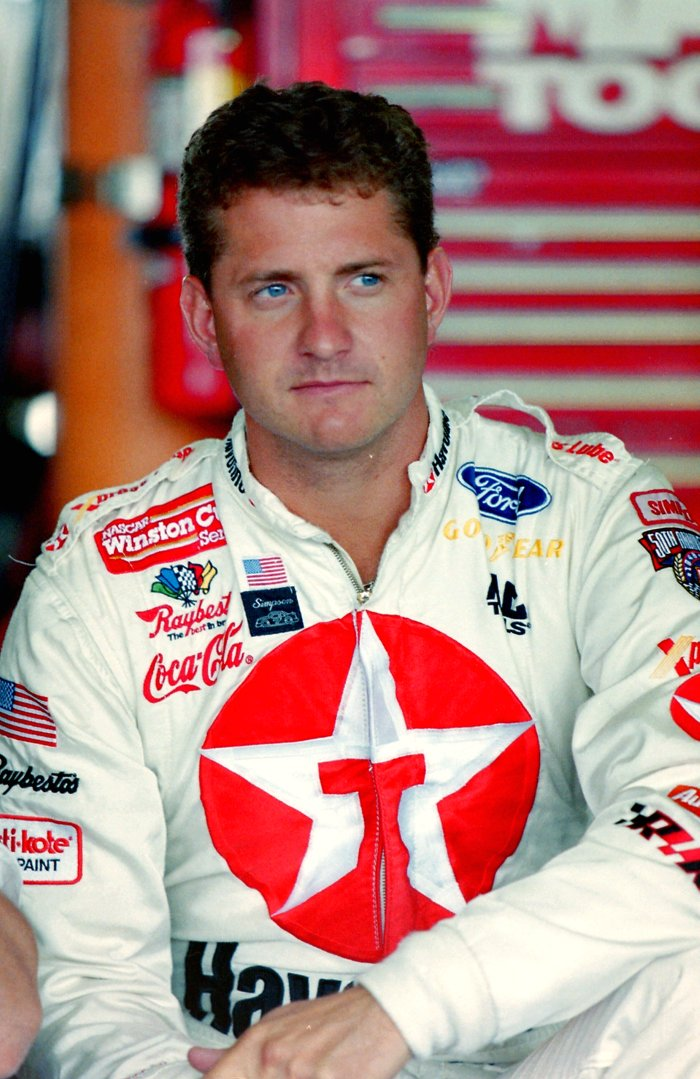
In 2000, drivers Adam Petty (left) and Kenny Irwin Jr. (right) died in separate crashes at the venue, drawing concerns over the track's safety.

In May 2000, NHIS' second fatality occurred when Busch Series driver Adam Petty crashed into the third turn wall after his car suffered a stuck throttle during a practice session. Two months later, Cup Series driver Kenny Irwin Jr. died crashing in almost the same manner as Petty. In the aftermath of both deaths, concerns over the track's safety, particularly over the turn's sharp radius and flat banking, was raised. In response, the track was smoothed out and sealed the following year. In 2002, the track was repaved, with the turns being made 12 feet (3.7 m) wider and the banking decreased from 12° to 6–7°, in the process creating another racing groove. The repave received heavy backlash from drivers for a deteriorating surface on the track's turns, causing track officials to repave the turns in time for the 2003 New England 300; the repave was met with consistent positive reception from drivers and media members. Also in 2003, the track installed SAFER barriers to prevent a death similar to Petty or Irwin's.

=== SMI's purchase ===
In July 2006, Bahre stated to the News & Record that while he was not currently seeking to sell NHIS, he admitted that "it might [happen] someday". By September 2007, Bahre stated that he had been in negotiations with "eight different groups of people" over a potential sale, including Boston Red Sox owner John W. Henry. On November 1, the Globe reported that the venue was bought out by racetrack conglomerate Speedway Motorsports, Inc. (SMI) and its owner, Bruton Smith; the report was confirmed in a press conference held by Smith a day later, with the company paying $340 million to own the facility. The sale was finalized on January 11, 2008; with the purchase, the facility was renamed to New Hampshire Motor Speedway (NHMS), with Jerry Gappens being appointed as the track's general manager. In 2009, a $4 million project aimed at renovating the track's infield was completed, which removed wetlands and trees to create more space. The following year, the venue's fourth fatality occurred when motorcycle racer Morgan Rose crashed on the road course's 11th turn during a race. In 2012, building off of original plans from two years earlier, track officials lobbied to build a casino in the New Hampshire General Court; however, a bill to double the amount of casinos within the state was killed in the New Hampshire House of Representatives in March. In October 2015, after Gappens pleaded guilty to a January charge for "lewdness" in public with a 19-year-old woman in a car six months earlier, he resigned as president of NHMS, with vice president of corporate sales David McGrath replacing Gappens. In 2018, capacity was decreased to 74,000 in response to decreasing attendance. Three years later, after further attendance declines, seating capacity was decreased further to 44,000.

== Events ==
=== Racing events ===
==== NASCAR ====
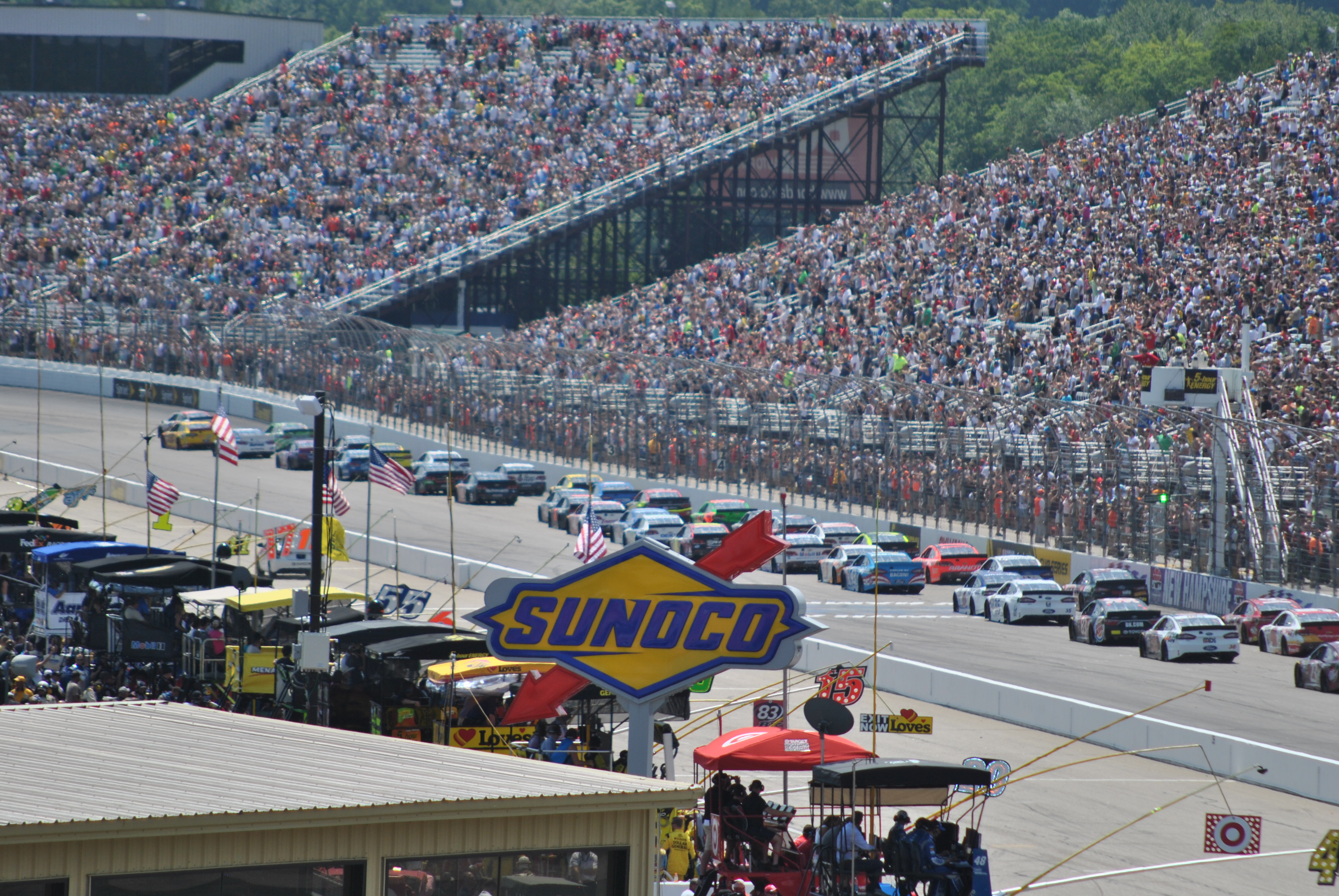
A NASCAR Cup Series race at NHMS in 2015. Since 1993, the venue has held at least one Cup Series race annually.

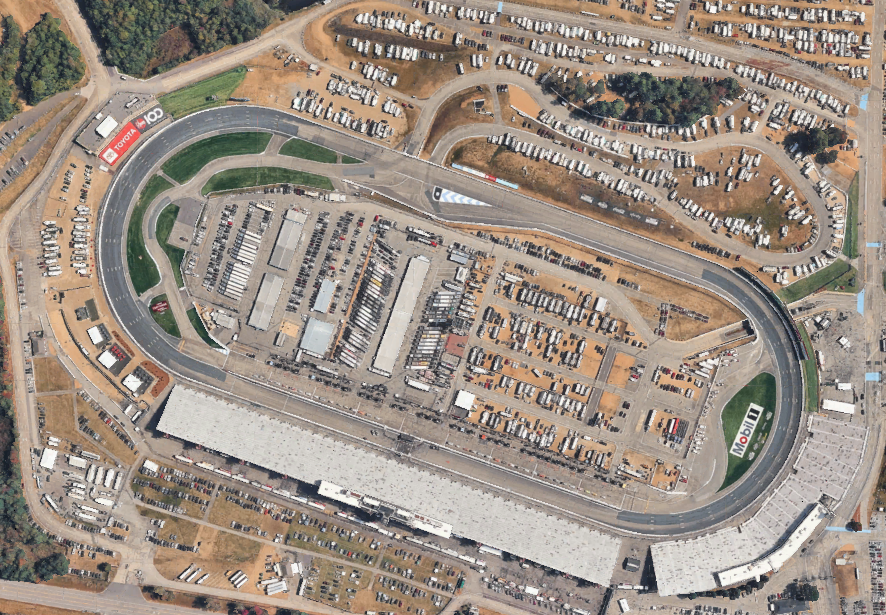
Satellite photo of NHMS taken the same day as the 2025 Mobil 1 301

NHMS hosts one NASCAR weekend annually, highlighted by a NASCAR Cup Series race currently referred as the Dollar Tree 301. The venue also hosts a NASCAR Truck Series race referred as the Team EJP 175 as a support event. The track also formerly hosted a Xfinity Series support race last known as the SciAps 200.

==== Open-wheel racing ====
Starting in 1992, NHMS held an annual Indy car race initially sanctioned by Championship Auto Racing Teams (CART). In 1996, the sanctioning body of the event was switched to the Indy Racing League (IRL) in the wake of the CART–IRL split. Following the 1998 IRL season, the race was taken off the IRL schedule due to poor attendance. In 2011, the now unified IndyCar Series made a one-off return to the venue; the series did not renew the following year due to low attendance.

==== Other racing events ====
- Since 1965, NHMS has hosted the Loudon Classic, a motorcycle competition. Until 2001, the event ran AMA Superbike Championship races.
- From 1966 to 1972, the then-named Bryar Motorsports Park ran Trans-Am Series races.
- In 1972, Bryar Motorsports Park ran a one-off IMSA GT Championship race.

=== Non-racing events ===
Since 2011, the venue has held a drive-thru Christmas lights show featuring "more than 3.5 million LED lights" according to WMUR's Ross Ketschke.

==== Unrealized events ====
In 2017, NHMS officials began submitting to the Canterbury Planning Board for approval to host a three-day country music festival, hoping to reverse a 1989 decision that banned the venue from hosting standalone concerts. After a decision was delayed for months, the festival was approved by Loudon's zoning committee when they allowed the speedway to host camping for the festival. However, shortly after the festival was approved by Loudon's planning board, the speedway was sued by three Merrimack County residents, arguing that the 1989 law still applied. After the Merrimack County Superior Court ruled in favor of the speedway, the residents appealed to the New Hampshire Supreme Court, who also ruled in favor of NHMS in February 2019. However, despite the festival's approval, it was delayed a year to 2020 due to contract signing wait times. In 2020, the festival was delayed further due to the COVID-19 pandemic.

== Lap records ==
The all-time outright track record is 0:21.466 seconds, set by Andre Ribeiro in a Reynard 95I, during qualifying for the 1995 New England 200. As of August 2026, the fastest official lap records at New Hampshire Motor Speedway are listed as:

Category	Time	Driver	Vehicle	Event
Oval (1990–present): 1.058 mi (1.703 km)
IndyCar	0:22.3481	Scott Dixon	Dallara IR-05	2011 MoveThatBlock.com Indy 225
CART	0:22.968	Teo Fabi	Reynard 95I	1995 New England 200
Indy Lights	0:25.038	Claude Bourbonnais	Lola T93/20	1995 Loudon Indy Lights round
Formula Atlantic	0:26.037	Jacques Villeneuve	Ralt RT40	1993 Loudon Formula Atlantic round
NASCAR Cup	0:29.812	Carson Hocevar	Chevrolet Camaro ZL1	2026 Dollar Tree 301
NASCAR Trucks	0:29.886	Corey Heim	Toyota Tundra TRD Pro	2025 Team EJP 175
NASCAR Xfinity	0:30.663	Cole Custer	Ford Mustang GT	2024 SciAps 200
Bryar Motorsports Park Road Course (1965–1989): 1.600 mi (2.575 km)
Trans-Am (TO)	1:12.100	George Follmer	Ford Mustang Boss 302	1971 Bryar Trans-Am round
IMSA GTU	1:14.312	John Buffum	Ford Escort	1972 Bryar 3 Hour
Sports car	1:16.200	Lewis Kerr	Brabham BT8	1965 S.C.C.A. National Bryar
Trans-Am (TU)	1:17.500	John Morton	Datsun 510	1972 Bryar Trans-Am round
