= Tim Sauter =

American stock car racing driver

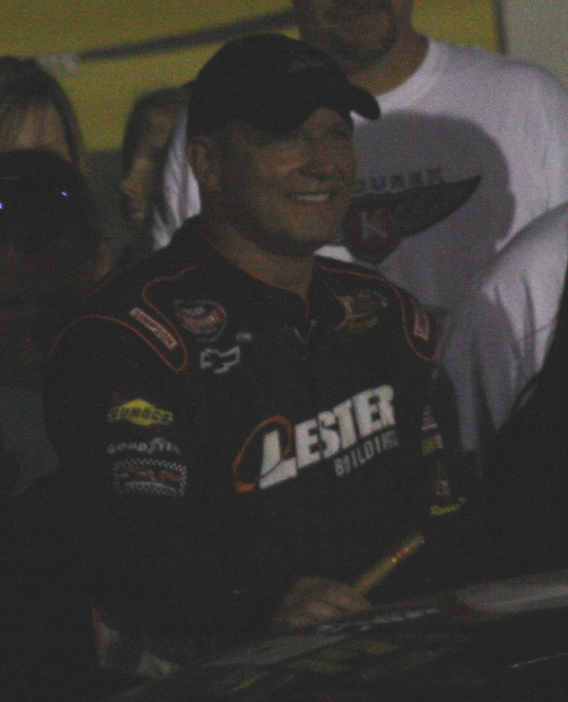
- Sauter in 2011 (wearing his 2007 Truck Series firesuit)
- Born: October 13, 1964 (age 62); Necedah, Wisconsin, U.S.
- Achievements: 1999 ASA National Tour Champion

NASCAR Cup Series career
- 2 races run over 1 year
- Best finish: 65th (2002)
- First race: 2002 Chevrolet Monte Carlo 400 (Richmond)
- Last race: 2002 MBNA All-American Heroes 400 (Dover)
Wins	Top tens	Poles
0	0	0

NASCAR O'Reilly Auto Parts Series career
- 111 races run over 7 years
- Best finish: 13th (2002)
- First race: 2000 Sam's Town 250 (Memphis)
- Last race: 2006 Sam's Town 250 (Memphis)
Wins	Top tens	Poles
0	9	0

NASCAR FedEx Freight Truck Series career
- 28 races run over 2 years
- Best finish: 16th (2007)
- First race: 2003 Power Stroke Diesel 200 (IRP)
- Last race: 2007 Ford 200 (Homestead)
Wins	Top tens	Poles
0	1	0
- Statistics up to date as of July 6, 2012.

Timothy Saibot Sauter (born October 13, 1964) is an American race car driver. He has competed in the American Speed Association, the NASCAR Craftsman Truck Series, the Busch Series, and the Winston Cup Series. He is the son of Jim Sauter, and the brother of NASCAR drivers Jay and Johnny Sauter.

== Racing career ==
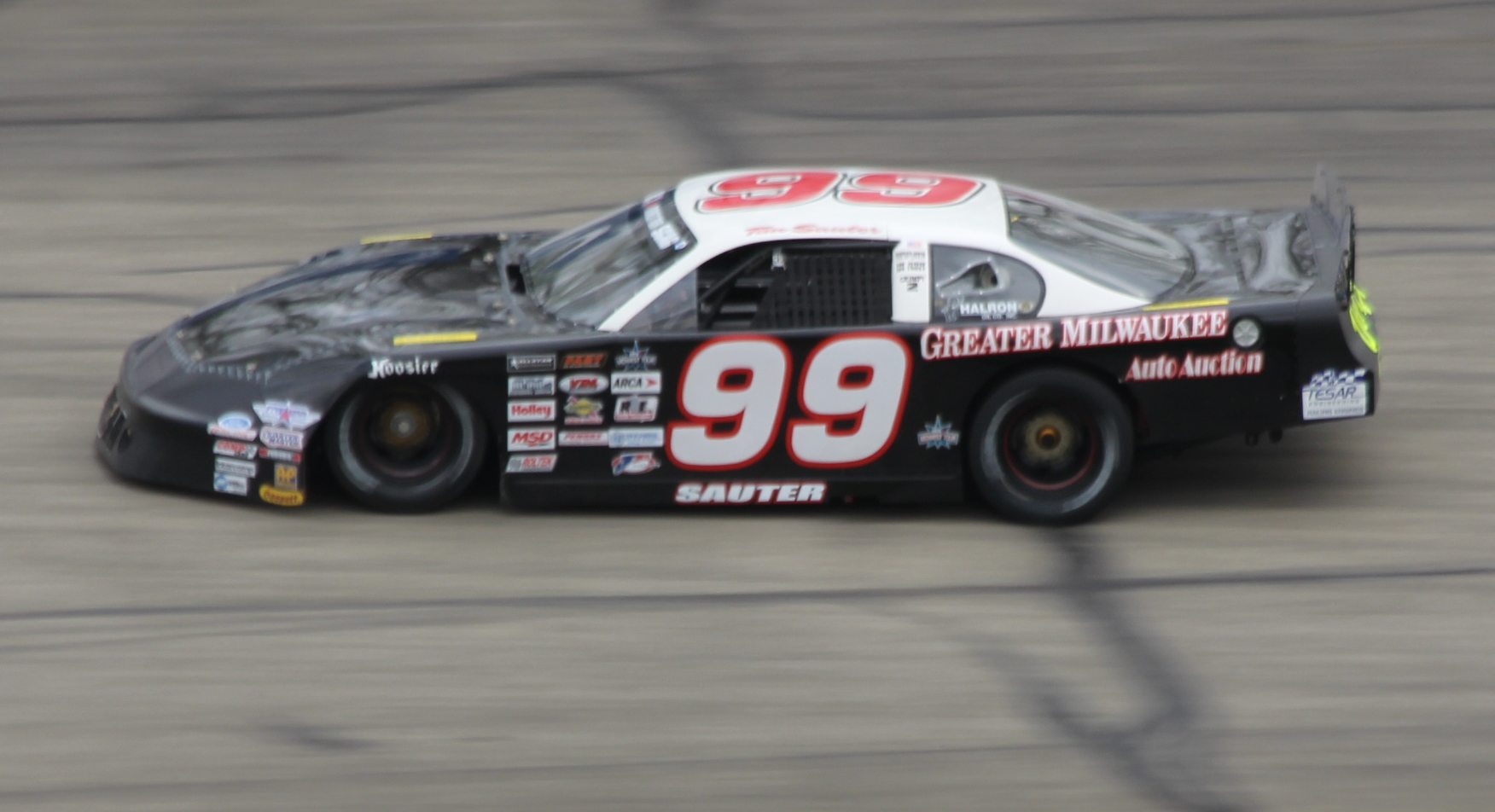
2016 ARCA Midwest Tour car

Sauter made his NASCAR debut in 2000, at Memphis. Driving the No. 61 Stoops Freightliner car for Xpress Motorsports, he finished 29th. He ran an additional two races that season with a best finish of fifteenth at Homestead-Miami Speedway. He joined the team for a full-time run in 2001, and posted two top-ten finishes before the team suddenly closed up due to a lack of funding. He ended the season driving for the No. 19 AP Performance Racing team. He returned to the No. 19 team full-time in 2002 and posted seven top-ten finishes. He also ran a pair of Cup races for Dave Marcis, his best finish 34th at Dover International Speedway. A lack of sponsorship forced AP to close its doors at the end of season.

In 2003, Sauter joined Mac Hill Motorsports for a part-time schedule of twelve races. His best finish came at New Hampshire International Speedway, where he finished seventeenth. He also drove in the Truck Series for three races, finishing fourteenth at Bristol Motor Speedway. He continued to drive part-time in 2004, driving the No. 56 Mac Hill car in four races. On August 4, 2005, the Gary SouthShore RailCats of the Northern League signed Sauter to a one-day contract. Though he struck out, he completed his baseball debut beating the Kansas City T-Bones.

In 2005, Lester Buildings became Sauter's sponsor and allowed him to run the No. 56 in twelve races. He was offered a full-time ride with McGill Motorsports in 2006, but he did not finish in the top-ten and mutually parted ways late in the season.

In 2007, Sauter drove the No. 07 Green Light Racing truck full-time as a teammate to Chad McCumbee with Lester Buildings sponsoring. Sauter was also involved in a scary crash at Martinsville when his truck was hit several times after getting loose off turn 4. He was uninjured.

Sautner has not raced professionally since 2007.

== Motorsports career results ==
=== NASCAR ===
(key) (Bold – Pole position awarded by qualifying time. Italics – Pole position earned by points standings or practice time. * – Most laps led.)

==== Winston Cup Series ====
NASCAR Winston Cup Series results
Year	Team	No.	Make	1	2	3	4	5	6	7	8	9	10	11	12	13	14	15	16	17	18	19	20	21	22	23	24	25	26	27	28	29	30	31	32	33	34	35	36	NWCC	Pts	Ref
2000	Xpress Motorsports	61	Chevy	DAY	CAR	LVS	ATL	DAR	BRI	TEX	MAR	TAL	CAL	RCH	CLT	DOV	MCH	POC	SON	DAY	NHA	POC	IND	GLN	MCH	BRI	DAR	RCH	NHA	DOV	MAR	CLT	TAL	CAR	PHO	HOM	ATL; DNQ			NA	-	
2002	Marcis Auto Racing	71	Chevy	DAY	CAR	LVS	ATL	DAR	BRI	TEX	MAR	TAL	CAL	RCH	CLT	DOV	POC	MCH	SON	DAY	CHI	NHA	POC	IND	GLN	MCH	BRI; DNQ	DAR	RCH; 37	NHA	DOV; 34	KAN	TAL	CLT	MAR	ATL	CAR; DNQ	PHO	HOM	65th	113	
2003	Marcis Auto Racing	71	Chevy	DAY	CAR	LVS	ATL	DAR	BRI	TEX	TAL	MAR	CAL	RCH	CLT	DOV	POC	MCH	SON	DAY	CHI	NHA; DNQ	POC	IND	GLN	MCH	BRI	DAR	RCH	NHA	DOV; DNQ	TAL	KAN	CLT	MAR	ATL	PHO	CAR; DNQ	HOM	NA	-	

==== Busch Series ====
NASCAR Busch Series results
Year	Team	No.	Make	1	2	3	4	5	6	7	8	9	10	11	12	13	14	15	16	17	18	19	20	21	22	23	24	25	26	27	28	29	30	31	32	33	34	35	NBSC	Pts	Ref
2000	Xpress Motorsports	61	Chevy	DAY	CAR	LVS	ATL	DAR	BRI	TEX	NSV	TAL	CAL	RCH	NHA	CLT	DOV	SBO	MYB	GLN	MLW	NZH	PPR	GTY	IRP	MCH	BRI	DAR	RCH; DNQ	DOV	CLT	CAR; DNQ		PHO; 21	HOM; 15				73rd	294	
2000	Xpress Motorsports	61	Pontiac																														MEM; 29						73rd	294	
2001	Xpress Motorsports	61	Pontiac	DAY; 10								TAL; 15																											32nd	1611	
2001	Xpress Motorsports	61	Chevy		CAR; 21	LVS; 13	ATL; 34	DAR; 29	BRI; 9	TEX; 34	NSH; 17		CAL; 25	RCH; 23	NHA; 16	NZH; 22	CLT; 23	DOV; 22	KEN; 43	MLW	GLN	CHI	GTY	PPR	IRP	MCH	BRI	DAR	RCH	DOV	KAN	CLT	MEM	PHO					32nd	1611	
2001	AP Performance Racing	19	Chevy																																CAR; 26	HOM; 40			32nd	1611	
2002	AP Performance Racing	19	Chevy	DAY; 26	CAR; 29	LVS; 17	DAR; 22	BRI; 16	TEX; 22	NSH; 10	TAL; 32	CAL; 7	RCH; 10	NHA; 12	NZH; 14	CLT; 19	DOV; 22	NSH; 32	KEN; 15	MLW; 9	DAY; 12	CHI; 34	GTY; 10	PPR; 23	IRP; 33	MCH; 20	BRI; 17	DAR; 19	RCH; 25	DOV; 8	KAN; 11	CLT; 13	MEM; 6	ATL; 32	CAR; 14	PHO; 26	HOM; 18		13th	3644	
2003	Mac Hill Motorsports	56	Chevy	DAY	CAR; 27	LVS	DAR; 30	BRI	TEX	TAL	NSH	CAL	RCH; 20	GTY	NZH	CLT; 27	DOV	NSH	KEN; 39	MLW; 23	DAY	CHI	NHA; 17	PPR	IRP	MCH	BRI; 21	DAR	RCH; 33	DOV	KAN	CLT	MEM; 18	ATL; 26	PHO	CAR; 30	HOM		46th	1028	
2004	Mac Hill Motorsports	56	Chevy	DAY	CAR	LVS	DAR	BRI	TEX	NSH	TAL	CAL	GTY	RCH	NZH	CLT	DOV	NSH	KEN	MLW; 19	DAY	CHI	NHA	PPR	IRP; 25	MCH	BRI	CAL	RCH; DNQ	DOV	KAN	CLT	MEM; 39	ATL	PHO	DAR; 40	HOM		79th	283	
2005	Mac Hill Motorsports	56	Chevy	DAY; DNQ	CAL	MXC	LVS	ATL	NSH; 34	BRI; DNQ	TEX	PHO	TAL; 12	DAR	RCH; 18	CLT	DOV	NSH; 27	KEN; 20	MLW; 37	DAY	CHI; DNQ	NHA	PPR; 25	GTY; 27	IRP; 40	GLN	MCH; DNQ	BRI; DNQ	CAL	RCH; DNQ	DOV; 30	KAN; DNQ	CLT	MEM; 38	TEX	PHO		49th	942	
2005	DCT Motorsports	36	Chevy																																			HOM; 30	49th	942	
2006	DCT Motorsports	36	Chevy	DAY; 19	CAL; 25	MXC; 30	LVS; 41	ATL; 31	BRI; 21	TEX; 37	NSH; 36	PHO; 24	TAL; 21	RCH; 39	DAR; 37	CLT; 27	DOV; 28	NSH; 24	KEN; 28	MLW; 27	DAY; 24	CHI; 33	NHA; 26	MAR; 19	GTY; 22	IRP; 33	GLN	MCH	BRI; 34	CAL	RCH; 35	DOV; 28	KAN; 25	CLT; DNQ	MEM; 31	TEX	PHO	HOM	21st	2879	

==== Craftsman Truck Series ====
NASCAR Craftsman Truck Series results
Year	Team	No.	Make	1	2	3	4	5	6	7	8	9	10	11	12	13	14	15	16	17	18	19	20	21	22	23	24	25	NCTC	Pts	Ref
2003	Keller Motorsports	35	Ford	DAY	DAR	MMR	MAR	CLT	DOV	TEX	MEM	MLW	KAN	KEN	GTW	MCH	IRP; 23	NSH	BRI; 14										77th	221	
2003	Keller Motorsports	53	Ford																	RCH; 21	NHA	CAL	LVS	SBO	TEX	MAR	PHO	HOM	77th	221	
2007	Green Light Racing	07	Chevy	DAY; 28	CAL; 26	ATL; 21	MAR; 29	KAN; 30	CLT; 17	MFD; 14	DOV; 23	TEX; 16	MCH; 11	MLW; 26	MEM; 18	KEN; 21	IRP; 28	NSH; 31	BRI; 28	GTW; 31	NHA; 23	LVS; 20	TAL; 21	MAR; 27	ATL; 21	TEX; 10	PHO; 24	HOM; 11	16th	2497	

=== ARCA Bondo/Mar-Hyde Series ===
(key) (Bold – Pole position awarded by qualifying time. Italics – Pole position earned by points standings or practice time. * – Most laps led.)

ARCA Bondo/Mar-Hyde Series results
Year	Team	No.	Make	1	2	3	4	5	6	7	8	9	10	11	12	13	14	15	16	17	18	19	20	ABMHC	Pts	Ref
2000	Xpress Motorsports	61	Chevy	DAY	SLM	AND	CLT	KIL	FRS	MCH	POC	TOL	KEN	BLN	POC	WIN	ISF	KEN	DSF	SLM	CLT	TAL	ATL; DNQ	NA	-	

Sporting positions
Preceded by Gary St. Amant	ASA National Tour Champion; 1999	Succeeded by Gary St. Amant
