= Travis Kvapil =

American racing driver (born 1976)

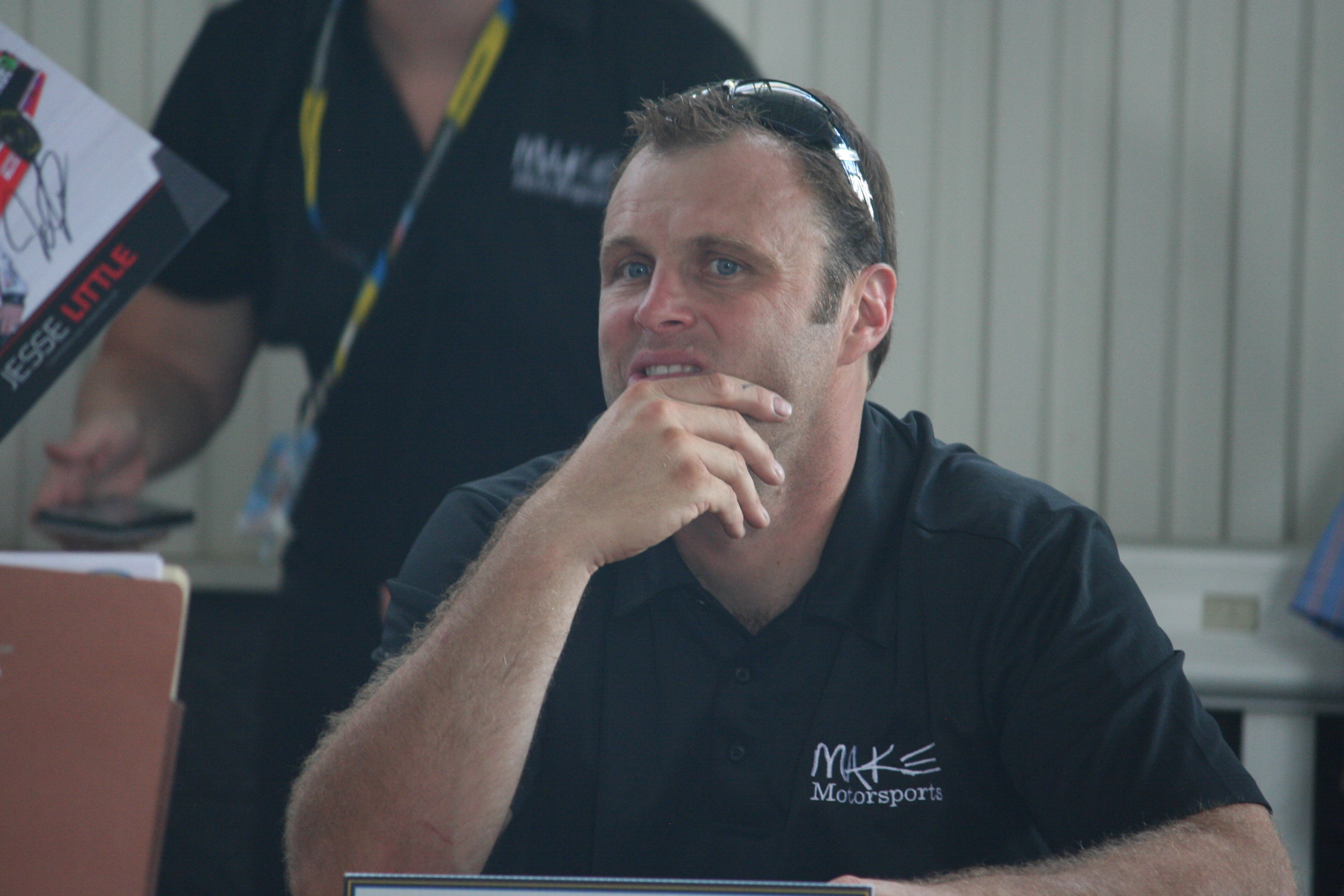
- Kvapil at Bristol Motor Speedway in 2016
- Born: Travis Wade Kvapil; March 1, 1976 (age 50); Janesville, Wisconsin, U.S.
- Achievements: 2003 NASCAR Craftsman Truck Series Champion
- Awards: 2001 Craftsman Truck Series Rookie of the Year

NASCAR Cup Series career
- 271 races run over 11 years
- 2015 position: 67th
- Best finish: 23rd (2008)
- First race: 2004 Subway 500 (Martinsville)
- Last race: 2015 CampingWorld.com 500 (Talladega)
| Wins | Top tens | Poles |
|---|---|---|
| 0 | 8 | 1 |

NASCAR O'Reilly Auto Parts Series career
- 13 races run over 5 years
- 2016 position: 113th
- Best finish: 111th (2007)
- First race: 2001 Outback Steakhouse 300 (Kentucky)
- Last race: 2016 Ford EcoBoost 300 (Homestead)
| Wins | Top tens | Poles |
|---|---|---|
| 0 | 0 | 0 |

NASCAR FedEx Freight Truck Series career
- 197 races run over 17 years
- 2019 position: 89th
- Best finish: 1st (2003)
- First race: 2001 Florida Dodge Dealers 250 (Daytona)
- Last race: 2019 TruNorth Global 250 (Martinsville)
- First win: 2001 Silverado 350K (Texas)
- Last win: 2007 Smith's Las Vegas 350 (Las Vegas)
| Wins | Top tens | Poles |
|---|---|---|
| 9 | 86 | 4 |
- Statistics up to date as of November 18, 2019.

Travis Wade Kvapil (/ˈkwɔːpəl/ KWAW-pəl; born March 1, 1976) is an American former professional stock car driver. He last competed part-time in the NASCAR Gander Outdoors Truck Series, driving the No. 1 Chevrolet Silverado for Beaver Motorsports.

He was the 2003 NASCAR Craftsman Truck Series champion.

== Early career ==
Kvapil grew up working on cars in his father's garage, and racing was a natural progression for the Wisconsin native. Kvapil began racing in 1992 at the age of sixteen at Rockford Speedway, competing in the NASCAR Weekly Racing Series. He went on to win the American Short Tracker division track championship in 1994 at Rockford. In 1995, he moved up to super late models at Madison International Speedway, "Wisconsin's Fastest Half-Mile", and was named the track Rookie of the Year. He also became the track's Late Model Champion a year later in 1996. This honor made Kvapil the youngest to ever capture the title at the track at the age of 20.

Kvapil moved to the ARTGO Series, a Midwest asphalt short-track motor-racing touring series. He finished in the top-ten in points from 1998–2000.

== NASCAR career ==
=== 2001–2004 ===
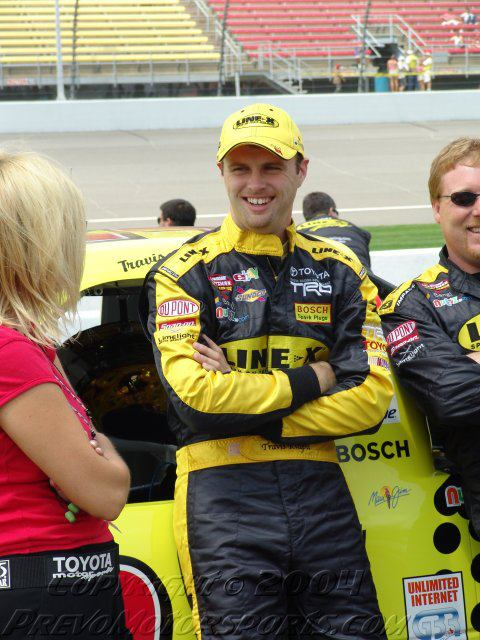
Travis standing in front of his 2004 Craftsman Truck @ Michigan International Speedway for the Line-X 200. Travis would go on to win this race giving Toyota is first win in a Nascar National Series

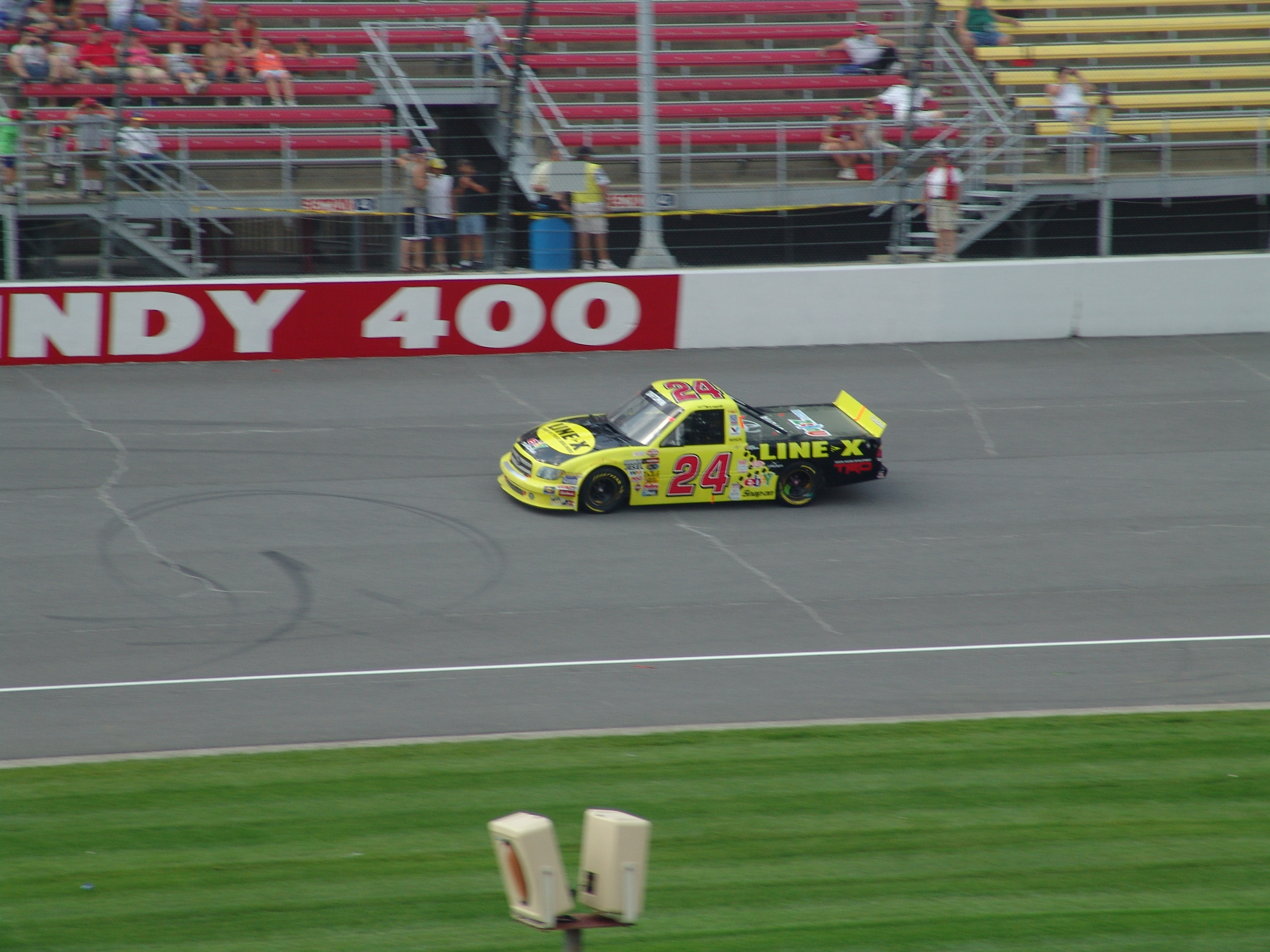
#24 Craftsman Truck Driven by Travis in 2004 @ Michigan International Speedway

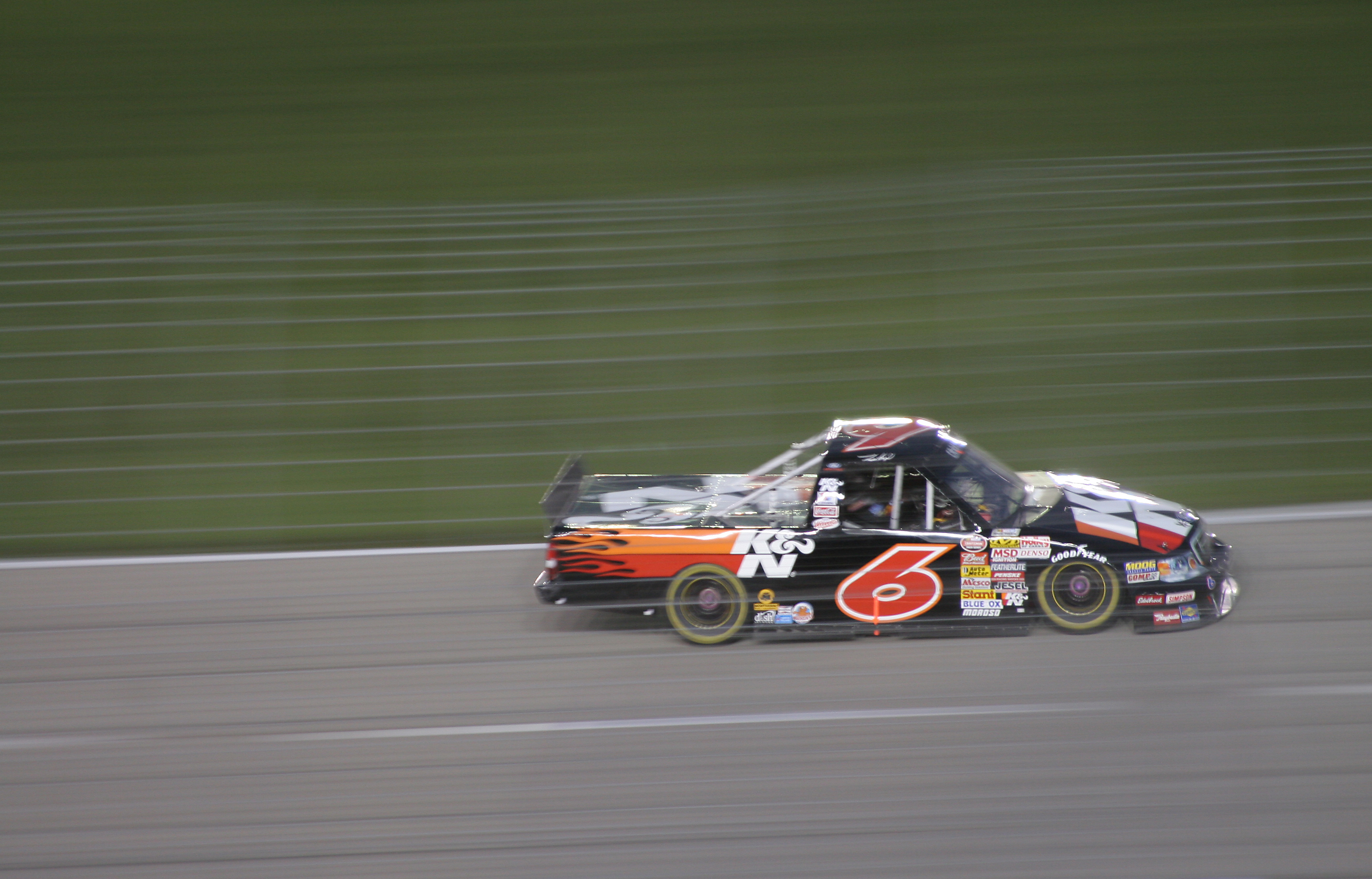
Kvapil raced for Roush Fenway Racing in their No. 6 Ford truck during the 2007 Craftsman Truck Series season. The sponsorship came from K&N Filters.

In 2001, Kvapil made his debut in the Craftsman Truck Series driving for Addington Racing in the No. 60 CAT Rental Stores Chevrolet. In his 21st start, Kvapil won his first Truck Series race in the Silverado 350 at Texas Motor Speedway. Kvapil's eighteen top-tens led him to finish fourth in the driver standings and win the Craftsman Truck Series Rookie of the Year. Kvapil also got to drive a race with powerhouse Richard Childress Racing at Kentucky in the Busch Series, but he ran poorly before flipping his car in a late crash.

In 2002, Kvapil managed to match his win total by winning the O'Reilly Auto Parts 200 at Memphis Motorsports Park. He finished the season with fourteen top-tens and finished ninth in the final driver points standings.

Funding issues at Addington caused Kvapil to switch to the No. 16 IWX MotorFreight Chevrolet for Steve Coulter's Xpress Motorsports team in 2003. He won one race during the season at Bristol Motor Speedway in the O'Reilly 200 presented by Valvoline Maxlife. Kvapil finished the season with 22 top-tens in 25 races (88 percent). Kvapil passed Brendan Gaughan and Ted Musgrave in points at the season finale at Homestead-Miami Speedway. Gaughan wrecked and Musgrave was black flagged during the race, giving the green flag to Kvapil as he was crowned the 2003 Craftsman Truck Series champion. He was recorded at 99.9 percent lap completion rate, only missing one lap throughout the 2003 season.

Prior to the start of the 2004 season, Kvapil began a partnership with Alexander Meshkin to drive the No. 24 Line-X Spray-on Bedliners / eBay Bang! Racing Toyota. Kvapil came away with his first win of the season during the Line-X Spray-on Truck Bedliners 200 at Michigan International Speedway. The win gave Toyota their first win in the top-tiers of NASCAR. Two months later, Kvapil won at New Hampshire International Speedway. The same season, Kvapil won his first Bud Pole Award in the Craftsman Truck Series at the American Racing Wheels 200 at California Speedway. He finished eight in the final driver standings of the season.

=== 2005–present ===
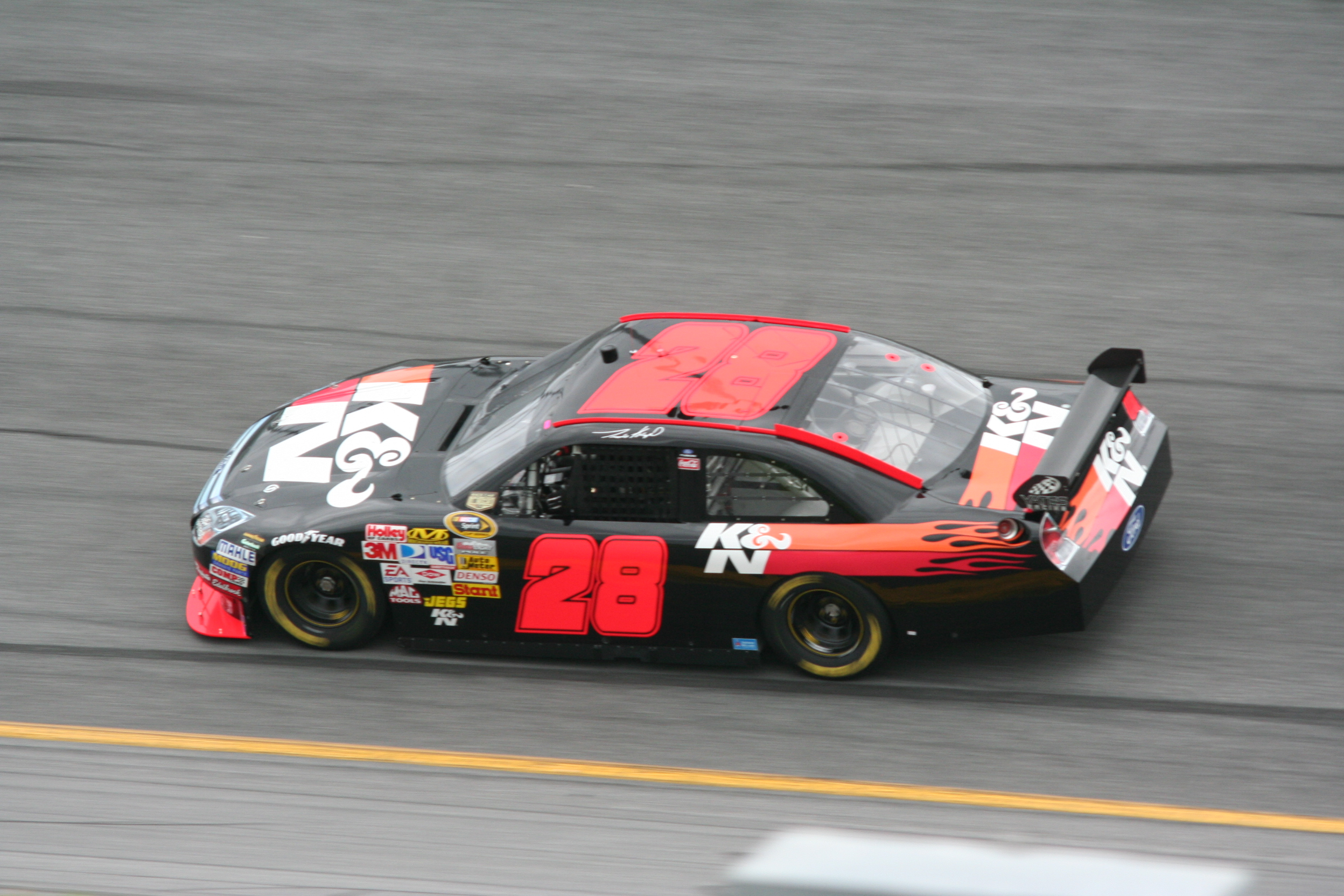
Kvapil drove for Yates Racing in their No. 28 Ford for the 2008 NASCAR Sprint Cup Series season. K&N Filters sponsored the team during the Daytona 500.

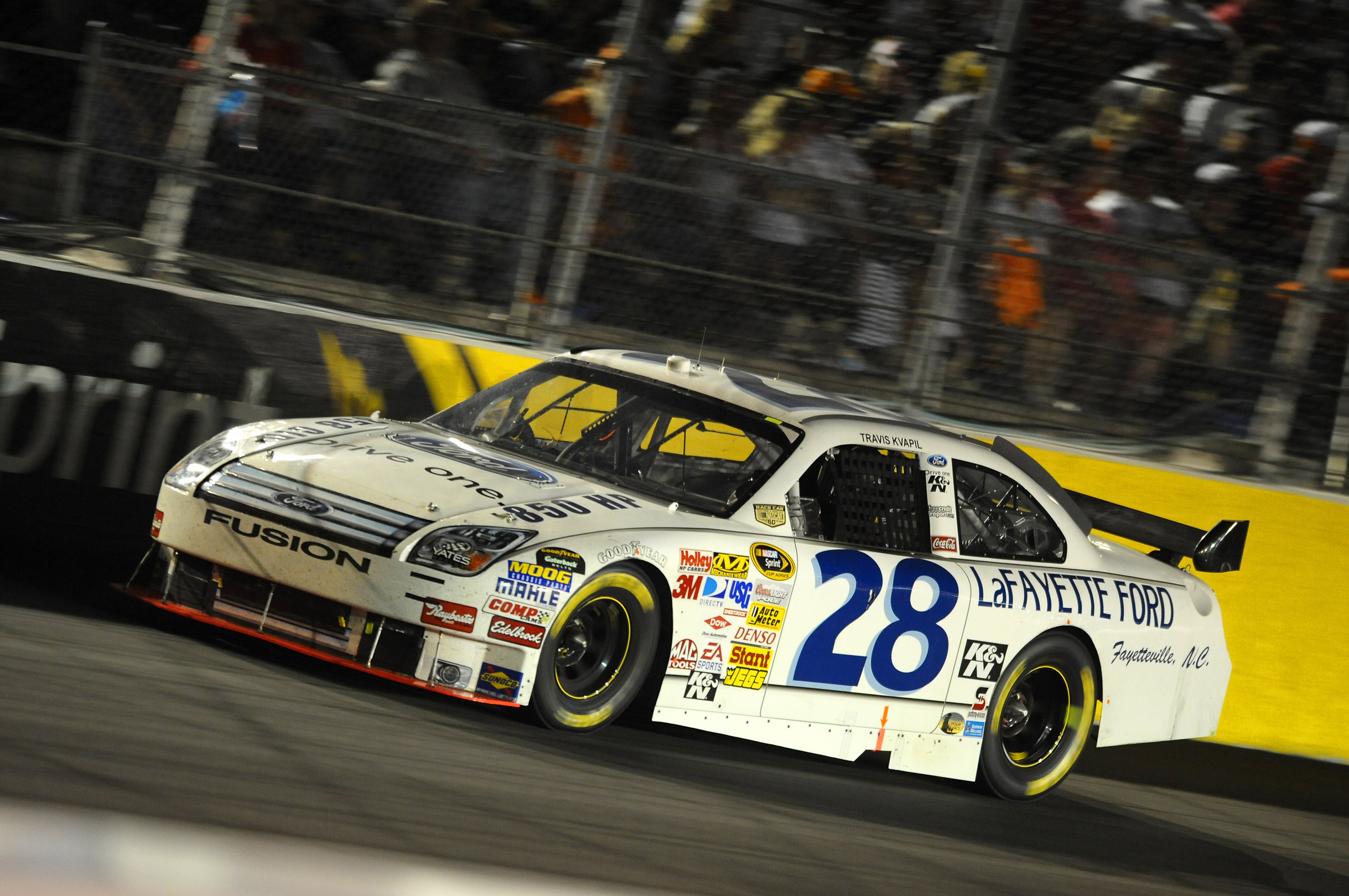
Kvapil in the No. 28 at Darlington in 2008

During the 2004 NASCAR seasons, Kvapil signed for a driver development program with Roger Penske, in hopes of moving up to the Cup Series while bypassing the Busch Series. It was believed by many that Penske was planning to bring Kvapil to the Cup Series for 2005 while he had minimal Busch Series experience; Penske and Kvapil did not comment the truth or falseness of the rumors. However, at the end of the 2004 season, Kvapil made his first NEXTEL Cup Series start at Martinsville Speedway. Kvapil drove the No. 06 Mobil 1 Dodge, the fourth car on the track from Penske Racing. He made three additional starts in the No. 06 in preparation for driving Penske Racing's No. 77 in 2005. In 2005, Kvapil took over the Penske's No. 77 Kodak-sponsored Dodge full-time, replacing Brendan Gaughan. Kvapil scored his first ever Nextel Cup Series top-ten at Bristol Motor Speedway when he finished seventh in the Food City 500. He picked up another top-ten at Phoenix International Raceway during the Checker Auto Parts 500. These two top-ten finishes pushed Kvapil to finish 33rd in the point standings during his first season in the series. When the season ended, the Penske Racing No. 77 team temporarily disbanded when Kodak pulled out of the sponsorship deal.

After his departure from Penske, Kvapil signed with PPI Motorsports for the 2006 NASCAR Sprint Cup season. He drove the No. 32 Tide Chevrolet for the 2006 season. He had his best finishes of the season at Kansas Speedway, Pocono Raceway, and Talladega Superspeedway, where he finished 19th in all three of those events. Kvapil finished the season 36th in points, and was forced to find a new ride for the next season as his PPI contract only lasted one year. PPI eventually shut down after the 2006 due to the inability to find a sponsor to replace Tide. The team also did not have a manufacturer commitment for the 2007 NASCAR Sprint Cup season.

In 2007, Jack Roush, owner of Roush Racing, offered Kvapil a seat in the No. 6 Ford F-150 in the NASCAR Camping World Truck Series. Kvapil replaced Mark Martin in the truck, who moved to Ginn Racing, and David Ragan, who was promoted to replace Martin in the No. 6 Ford in the NASCAR Sprint Cup Series. Jack Roush, excited about signing with Kvapil, said, “We are pleased beyond measure that we were able to get a driver the caliber of Travis Kvapil. At only 30 years old with a Truck championship and two years of Sprint Cup experience under his belt, Travis brings great long and short term potential to and for Roush Racing.” He finished the season with four wins, three poles, eight top-fives and twelve top-tens. He finished the season sixth in the driver point standings. He returned to Roush Fenway Racing as a part-time driver in 2008 when Joey Clanton was released from the No. 09 Ford.

Roush recognized Kvapil's talents, and helped return to Cup with Yates Racing in 2008. Kvapil drove the famous No. 28 Yates Ford Fusion. Prior to the start of the season, Kvapil and teammate David Gilliland did not have a full-time sponsorship on their Yates Racing Fords. While Gilliland's team found full-time sponsorship, Kvapil's team had to piece together sponsorship throughout the season. K&N Filters-sponsored Kvapil's team for the Daytona 500. Two weeks later, Kvapil scored an eighth place finish at Las Vegas Motor Speedway during the UAW-Dodge 400. The finish at LVMS, which was in an unsponsored car, gave Kvapil his third top-ten of his career. After the race, it was announced that Zaxby's would serve as a sponsorship for the No. 28 team in the Kobalt Tools 500 at Atlanta Motor Speedway, a race in which he finished 29th. With a one-race sponsorship deal with Northern Tool and Equipment, Kvapil finished sixth in the Aaron's 499 at Talladega. This gave him his career-best finish in the Sprint Cup Series. Kvapil picked up another top-ten finish in the Dodge Challenger 500 at Darlington. Despite the lack of sponsorship for the year, Kvapil collected another four top-ten finishes, finishing 23rd in the points standings. He also won the pole at the fall Talladega race, which turned out to be the last pole award for Yates Racing.

In 2009, Kvapil returned to the No. 28, but the team was forced to close after six races due to lack of funding. Yates Racing ended up shutting down after the season. Kvapil qualified for several drivers through the rest of the year, but did not have a full-time ride.

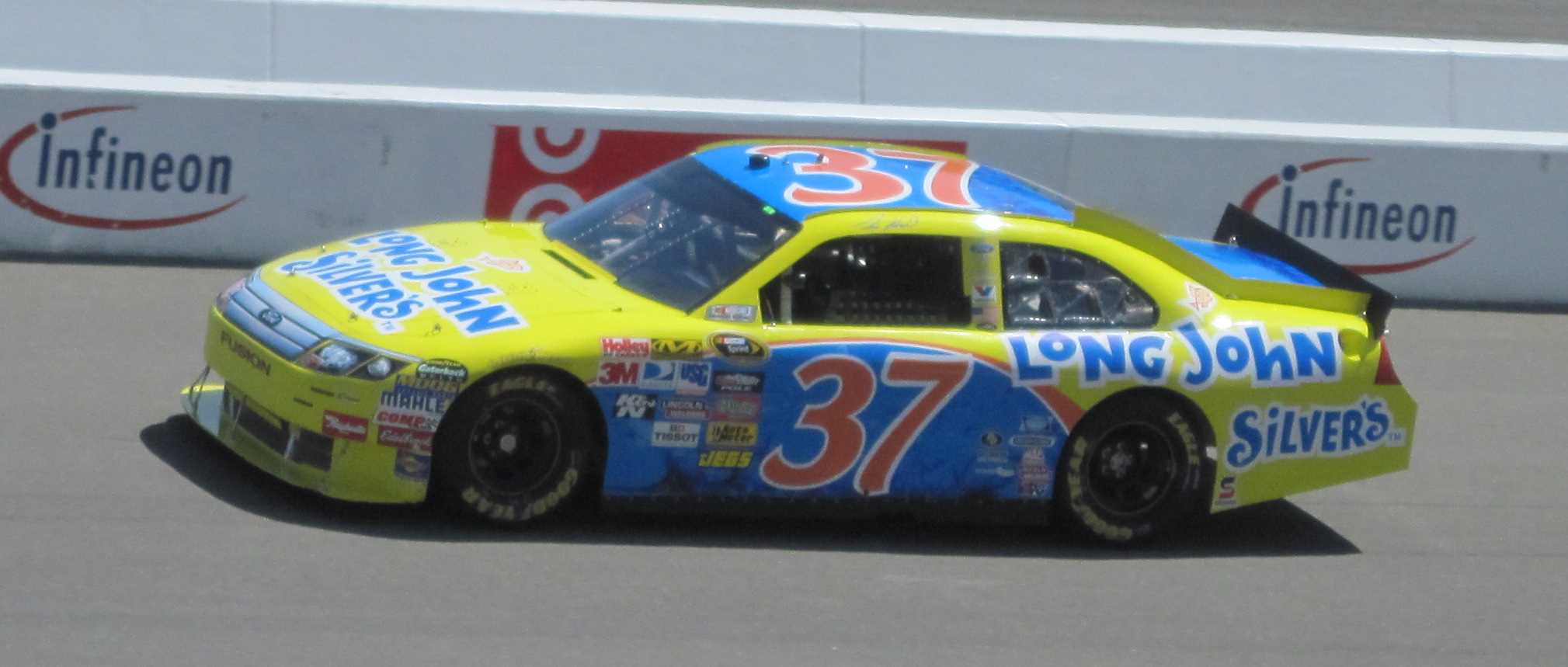
Kvapil in the No. 37 for Front Row Motorsports at Infineon Raceway in 2010

In 2010, Kvapil returned to a full-time ride in the Long John Silver's Ford for Front Row Motorsports. This car changed numbers throughout the year, using either No. 34, No. 37, or No. 38, depending on each number's position in points (with the goal being to get all three cars in the Top 35 for 2011). In 2011, Kvapil returned to FRM full-time in the No. 38 car, but signed up to compete for the Camping World Truck Series championship with Randy Moss Motorsports in their No. 5 Toyota. After 10 races, however, Kvapil was released in favor of defending Truck champion Todd Bodine, whose Germain Racing team partnered with RMM to continue running that driver for 2011. Kvapil stuck with FRM in the Cup Series, driving their No. 38 for most races, except in several late-season races, J. J. Yeley swapped rides with Kvapil several times, with the latter driving FRM's start and park No. 55.

Leaving FRM after the end of the 2011 season, Kvapil was signed by BK Racing to compete in the Sprint Cup Series for 2012. He drove the No. 93 Toyota starting with the second race of the year at Phoenix with Todd Anderson serving as crew chief; At Darlington, where David Reutimann drove the No. 93, Kvapil drove the No. 73 for BK Racing, though he drove the No. 93 for the remainder of the season. He also drove for RAB Racing in the season-opening Camping World Truck Series event, replacing a suspended John Wes Townley. Kvapil ended the 2012 Cup season 27th in points, his second best finish in the points since his debut.

However, in 2013, both Kvapil and BK Racing struggled. Kvapil dropped to 31st in points, recording five top-twenty finishes but nine DNFs (including five blown engines). The team released Kvapil shortly before the start of the 2014 season.

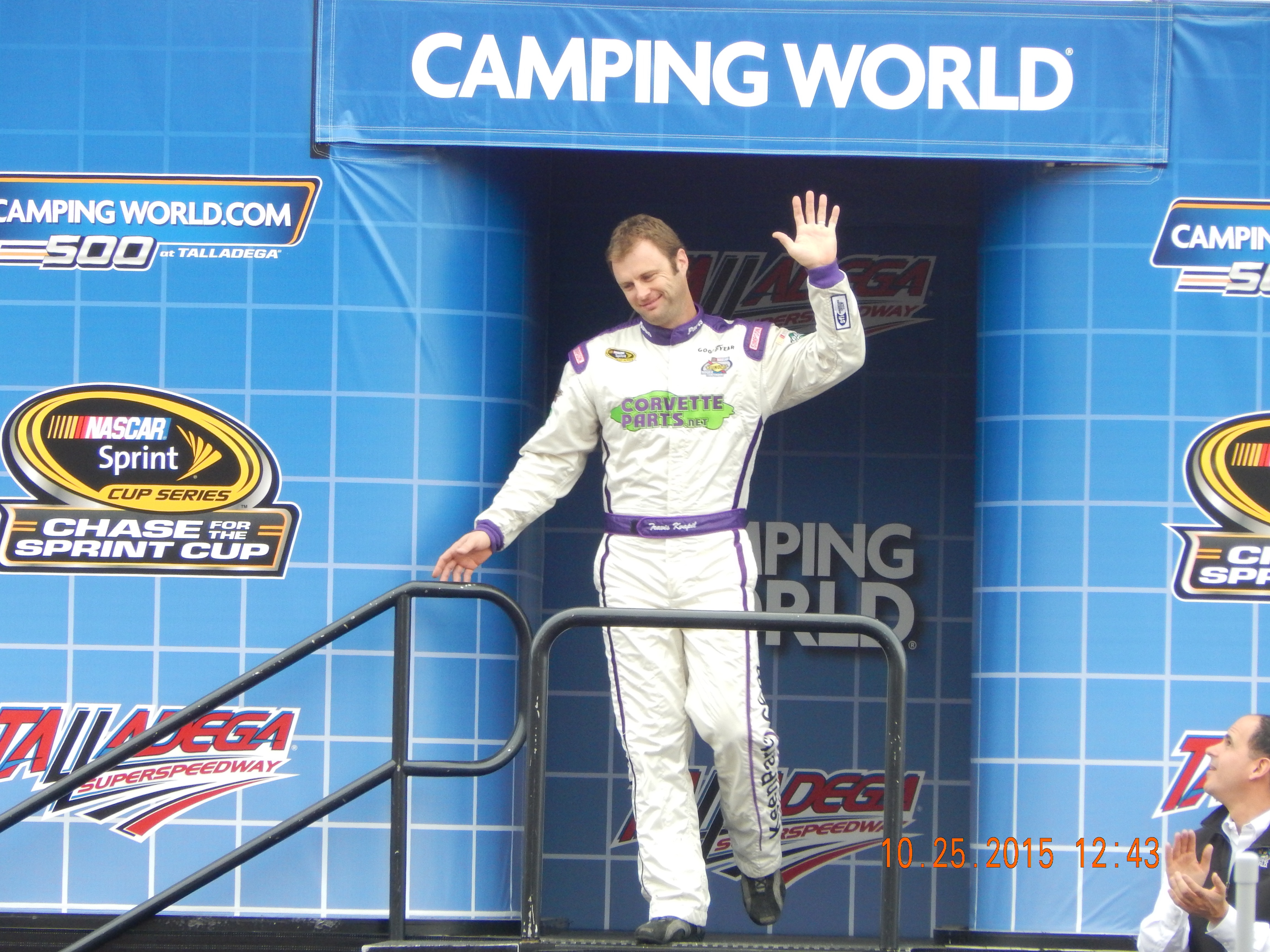
Kvapil at the 2015 CampingWorld.com 500 at Talladega

During Speedweeks 2014, Kvapil announced that he had signed to drive in the Sprint Cup Series for Go FAS Racing on a limited basis, as well as for MAKE Motorsports in the Camping World Truck Series. On August 12, it was announced that Kvapil would replace Townley in the No. 05 Athenian Motorsports Toyota for the Truck race at Michigan. Kvapil also ran several late-season races for Circle Sport, tying his best career finish of sixth at Talladega. Also in the fall, he returned to BK Racing to run the No. 83 Toyota in several races after the team released rookie Ryan Truex. Kvapil was scheduled to make a qualifying attempt for the 2015 Cup season at Atlanta, driving the No. 44 Chevrolet for Team Xtreme, but was forced to withdraw when his car, hauler and truck were stolen from a hotel parking lot. For 2015, Kvapil mostly raced in the truck series driving the No. 1 Chevrolet for MAKE Motorsports. Later that season, Kvapil attempted some races for Curtis Key's team, but the team was struggling to qualify, and Kvapil DNQed in all of his attempts.

In 2016, Kvapil announced that he would run the full Camping World Truck Series season with MAKE Motorsports once again. In the season opener at Daytona, Kvapil scored a fifth-place finish. He also made his return to the Xfinity Series, driving the No. 15 Ford for B. J. McLeod Motorsports at Richmond and Talladega.

Kvapil continued to drive the No. 50 truck for MAKE, now known as Beaver Motorsports, in 2017. He also drove for MB Motorsports and Bolen Motorsports. Kvapil only attempted the first two races in 2018, making Daytona, where he finished last. He made just one start in 2019, which was at Martinsville. Kvapil has not raced in NASCAR since 2019.

== Personal life ==
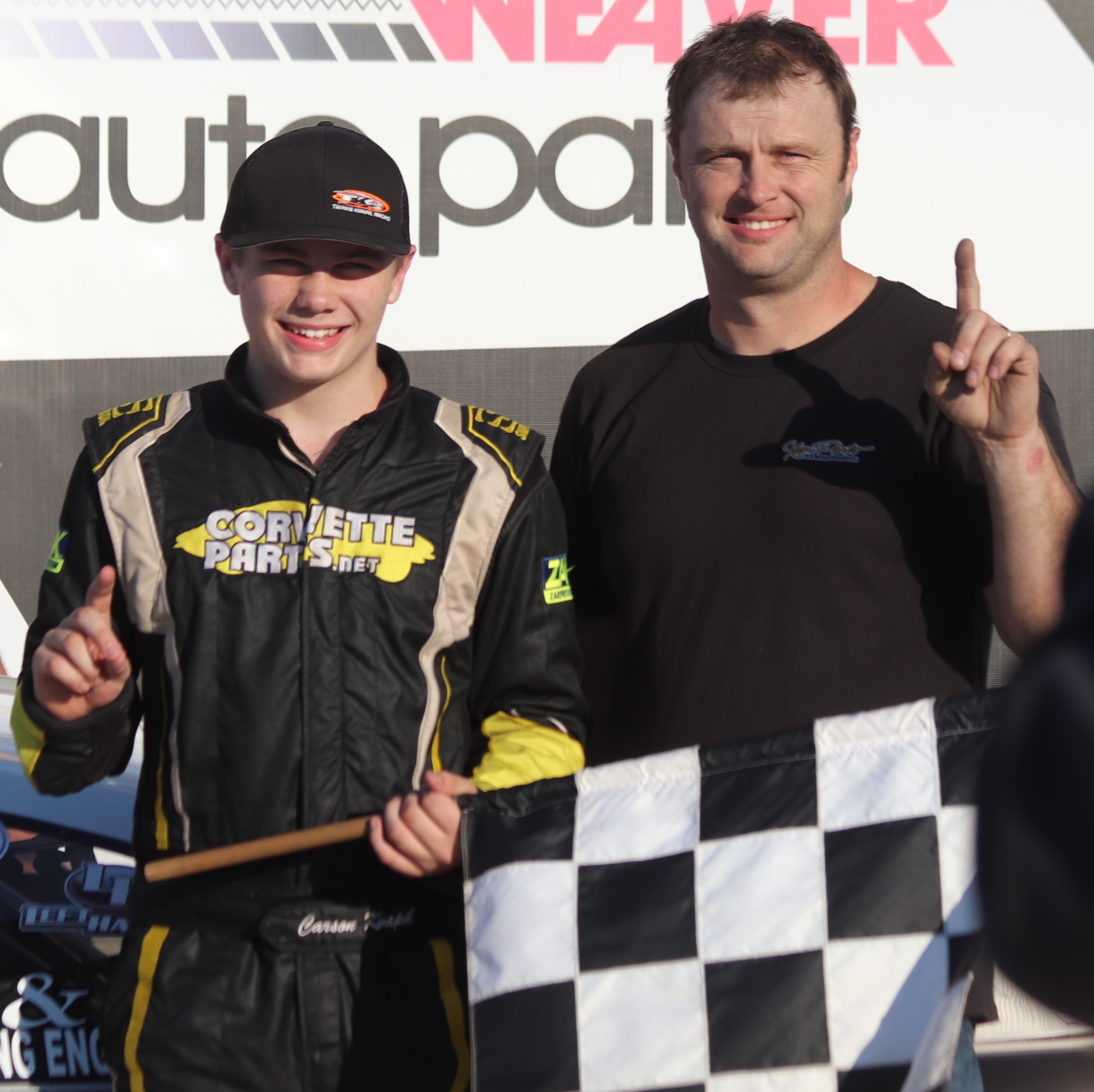
Kvapil (right) posing in 2018 with his son Carson after the younger Kvapil won his second Super Late Model race

Kvapil is married to his wife Jennifer, and has three children: Kelsey, Carson and Caden. Carson drives for JR Motorsports and DGM Racing in the NASCAR O'Reilly Auto Parts Series as of 2026. The Kvapils reside in Mooresville, North Carolina.

Kvapil competed against fellow Wisconsin native Matt Kenseth at Madison International Speedway. Kvapil, like Kenseth, is an avid Green Bay Packers fan. During the 2006 NASCAR Nextel Cup season, Kvapil and his No. 32 Tide from PPI Motorsports appeared on an episode of Guiding Light.

=== Legal issues ===
On October 8, 2013, Kvapil was arrested by the Mooresville police department following a domestic dispute. Kvapil was charged with assault on a female and false imprisonment, and was released on $1,000 bail. Kvapil was allowed to race in that weekend's Bank of America 500 at Charlotte Motor Speedway. On January 30, 2014, it was announced that Kvapil had accepted a plea deal in the case, pleading guilty in exchange for having the case dismissed following two years' probation, community service, and attending an anger management class.

== Motorsports career results ==
=== NASCAR ===
(key) (Bold – Pole position awarded by qualifying time. Italics – Pole position earned by points standings or practice time. * – Most laps led.)

==== Cup Series ====
NASCAR Cup Series results
| Year | Team | No. | Make | 1 | 2 | 3 | 4 | 5 | 6 | 7 | 8 | 9 | 10 | 11 | 12 | 13 | 14 | 15 | 16 | 17 | 18 | 19 | 20 | 21 | 22 | 23 | 24 | 25 | 26 | 27 | 28 | 29 | 30 | 31 | 32 | 33 | 34 | 35 | 36 | NCC | Pts | Ref |
|---|---|---|---|---|---|---|---|---|---|---|---|---|---|---|---|---|---|---|---|---|---|---|---|---|---|---|---|---|---|---|---|---|---|---|---|---|---|---|---|---|---|---|
| 2004 | Penske-Jasper Racing | 06 | Dodge | DAY | CAR | LVS | ATL | DAR | BRI | TEX | MAR | TAL | CAL | RCH | CLT | DOV | POC | MCH | SON | DAY | CHI | NHA | POC | IND | GLN | MCH | BRI | CAL | RCH | NHA | DOV | TAL | KAN | CLT | MAR; 21 | ATL; 32 | PHO | DAR; DNQ | HOM; 39 | 63rd | 213 | |
| 2005 | Penske-Jasper Racing | 77 | Dodge | DAY; 19 | CAL; 24 | LVS; 26 | ATL; 42 | BRI; 7 | MAR; 27 | TEX; 30 | PHO; 40 | TAL; 18 | DAR; 35 | RCH; 22 | CLT; 32 | DOV; 17 | POC; 17 | MCH; 26 | SON; 21 | DAY; 23 | CHI; 43 | NHA; 27 | POC; 38 | IND; 37 | GLN; 40 | MCH; 38 | BRI; 19 | CAL; 33 | RCH; 11 | NHA; 41 | DOV; 21 | TAL; 16 | KAN; 22 | CLT; 17 | MAR; 21 | ATL; 26 | TEX; 24 | PHO; 10 | HOM; 32 | 33rd | 3077 | |
| 2006 | PPI Motorsports | 32 | Chevy | DAY; 27 | CAL; DNQ | LVS; 39 | ATL; DNQ | BRI; 40 | MAR; 34 | TEX; 27 | PHO; 21 | TAL; 19 | RCH; 27 | DAR; 30 | CLT; 22 | DOV; 29 | POC; 19 | MCH; 21 | | DAY; 30 | CHI; 37 | NHA; 35 | POC; 27 | IND; 25 | GLN | MCH; 21 | BRI; 20 | CAL; 34 | RCH; 28 | NHA; 27 | DOV; 39 | KAN; 19 | TAL; DNQ | CLT; 20 | MAR; 40 | ATL; 32 | TEX; 28 | PHO; 30 | HOM; 27 | 36th | 2451 | |
| 2006 | Furniture Row Racing | 78 | Chevy | | | | | | | | | | | | | | | | SON; DNQ | | | | | | | | | | | | | | | | | | | | | 36th | 2451 | |
| 2008 | Yates Racing | 28 | Ford | DAY; 30 | CAL; 36 | LVS; 8 | ATL; 29 | BRI; 27 | MAR; 18 | TEX; 18 | PHO; 22 | TAL; 6 | RCH; 16 | DAR; 8 | CLT; 26 | DOV; 11 | POC; 23 | MCH; 16 | SON; 22 | NHA; 36 | DAY; 31 | CHI; 41 | IND; 36 | POC; 16 | GLN; 36 | MCH; 13 | BRI; 24 | CAL; 28 | RCH; 17 | NHA; 26 | DOV; 23 | KAN; 34 | **TAL**; 27 | CLT; 42 | MAR; 19 | ATL; 23 | TEX; 32 | PHO; 21 | HOM; 7 | 23rd | 3384 | |
| 2009 | Yates Racing | 28 | Ford | DAY; 42 | CAL; 18 | LVS; DNQ | ATL; 42 | BRI; 18 | MAR | TEX | PHO | TAL | RCH | DAR | CLT | DOV | POC | MCH | SON | NHA | DAY | CHI | IND | POC | GLN | MCH | BRI | ATL | RCH | NHA | DOV | KAN | CAL | | | | | | | 49th | 378 | |
| 2009 | Front Row Motorsports | 37 | Dodge | | | | | | | | | | | | | | | | | | | | | | | | | | | | | | | CLT; DNQ | MAR; 43 | TAL | TEX | PHO | | 49th | 378 | |
| 2009 | Front Row Motorsports | 37 | Chevy | | | | | | | | | | | | | | | | | | | | | | | | | | | | | | | | | | | | HOM; 37 | 49th | 378 | |
| 2010 | Front Row Motorsports | 37 | Ford | DAY; 29 | | | | | | | | | | | | | | | SON; 24 | NHA; DNQ | | | IND; 24 | | GLN; 30 | | | | | | | | | | | | | | | 33rd | 2426 | |
| 2010 | Front Row Motorsports | 34 | Ford | | CAL; 30 | LVS; 24 | ATL; 30 | BRI; 25 | MAR; 27 | PHO; 36 | TEX; 24 | TAL; 18 | RCH; 34 | DAR; 26 | DOV; 29 | | | | | | | | | | | | BRI; 22 | ATL; 29 | | | DOV; 33 | KAN; 33 | CAL; 28 | CLT; 31 | | | TEX; 41 | | HOM; 34 | 33rd | 2426 | |
| 2010 | Front Row Motorsports | 38 | Ford | | | | | | | | | | | | | CLT; 28 | POC; 22 | MCH; 31 | | | DAY; 34 | CHI; 31 | | POC; 29 | | MCH; 30 | | | RCH; 35 | NHA; 32 | | | | | MAR; 35 | TAL; DNQ | | PHO; 34 | | 33rd | 2426 | |
| 2011 | Front Row Motorsports | 38 | Ford | DAY; 32 | PHO; 39 | LVS; 33 | BRI; 26 | CAL; 35 | MAR; 37 | TEX; DNQ | TAL; 29 | RCH; 30 | DAR; 26 | DOV; 31 | CLT; 25 | KAN; 34 | POC | MCH; 31 | SON | DAY; 29 | KEN; 29 | NHA | IND; DNQ | POC; 31 | GLN | MCH; 28 | BRI; 37 | | RCH; 28 | | | | KAN; 27 | | TAL; 21 | MAR; 16 | TEX; 31 | | HOM; 22 | 56th | 0^{1} | |
| 2011 | Front Row Motorsports | 55 | Ford | | | | | | | | | | | | | | | | | | | | | | | | | ATL; 42 | | CHI; DNQ | NHA; 43 | DOV; 43 | | CLT; 40 | | | | PHO; 43 | | 56th | 0^{1} | |
| 2012 | BK Racing | 93 | Toyota | DAY | PHO; 19 | LVS; 39 | BRI; 27 | CAL; 29 | MAR; 27 | TEX; 38 | KAN; 25 | RCH; 30 | TAL; 16 | | CLT; 29 | DOV; 23 | POC; 26 | MCH; 26 | SON; 36 | KEN; 17 | DAY; 16 | NHA; 30 | IND; 37 | POC; 25 | GLN; 24 | MCH; 15 | BRI; 18 | ATL; 26 | RCH; 27 | CHI; 31 | NHA; 31 | DOV; 29 | TAL; 8 | CLT; 25 | KAN; 17 | MAR; 31 | TEX; 23 | PHO; 20 | HOM; 26 | 27th | 638 | |
| 2012 | BK Racing | 73 | Toyota | | | | | | | | | | | DAR; 32 | | | | | | | | | | | | | | | | | | | | | | | | | | 27th | 638 | |
| 2013 | BK Racing | 93 | Toyota | DAY; 25 | PHO; 29 | LVS; 39 | BRI; 38 | CAL; 34 | MAR; 39 | TEX; 22 | KAN; 36 | RCH; 37 | TAL; 38 | DAR; 23 | CLT; 40 | DOV; 39 | POC; 20 | MCH; 27 | SON; 17 | KEN; 42 | DAY; 18 | NHA; 38 | IND; 31 | POC; 26 | GLN; 40 | MCH; 28 | BRI; 16 | ATL; 27 | RCH; 28 | CHI; 24 | NHA; 28 | DOV; 31 | KAN; 26 | CLT; 35 | TAL; 19 | MAR; 24 | TEX; 32 | PHO; 41 | HOM; 37 | 31st | 496 | |
| 2014 | Go FAS Racing | 32 | Ford | DAY | PHO; 38 | LVS; 39 | BRI; 33 | CAL; 33 | MAR; 33 | TEX; 37 | DAR; 33 | RCH; 36 | TAL | KAN; 34 | CLT | DOV | POC; 29 | MCH; 43 | SON | KEN; 34 | DAY | NHA | IND; 39 | POC; 25 | GLN | MCH; 32 | BRI | ATL | RCH; 39 | | | | | | | | | | | 38th | 214 | |
| 2014 | Circle Sport | 33 | Chevy | | | | | | | | | | | | | | | | | | | | | | | | | | | CHI; 38 | | | | | TAL; 6 | MAR; 41 | TEX | PHO | HOM | 38th | 214 | |
| 2014 | BK Racing | 83 | Toyota | | | | | | | | | | | | | | | | | | | | | | | | | | | | NHA; 32 | DOV; 38 | KAN | CLT | | | | | | 38th | 214 | |
| 2015 | Team Xtreme Racing | 44 | Chevy | DAY | ATL; Wth | LVS; DNQ | PHO; DNQ | CAL; DNQ | MAR; Wth | | | | | | | | | | | | | | | | | | | | | | | | | | | | | | | 67th | 0^{1} | |
| 2015 | Hillman Smith Motorsports | 39 | Chevy | | | | | | | TEX; Wth | BRI | RCH | TAL | KAN | CLT; DNQ | DOV; DNQ | | | | | | | | | | | | | | | | | | | | | | | | 67th | 0^{1} | |
| 2015 | Go FAS Racing | 32 | Ford | | | | | | | | | | | | | | POC; 35 | MCH | SON | DAY | | | | POC; 32 | GLN | | | | | | | | | | | | | | | 67th | 0^{1} | |
| 2015 | The Motorsports Group | 30 | Chevy | | | | | | | | | | | | | | | | | | KEN; DNQ | NHA | IND | | | | BRI; DNQ | DAR; DNQ | RCH | CHI; DNQ | NHA; DNQ | DOV; Wth | CLT | KAN | | | | | | 67th | 0^{1} | |
| 2015 | Circle Sport | 33 | Chevy | | | | | | | | | | | | | | | | | | | | | | | MCH; 40 | | | | | | | | | TAL; 35 | MAR | TEX | PHO | HOM | 67th | 0^{1} | |

===== Daytona 500 =====
| Year | Team | Manufacturer | Start | Finish |
|---|---|---|---|---|
| 2005 | Penske-Jasper Racing | Dodge | 25 | 19 |
| 2006 | PPI Motorsports | Chevrolet | 40 | 27 |
| 2008 | Yates Racing | Ford | 30 | 30 |
| 2009 | Yates Racing | Ford | 41 | 42 |
| 2010 | Front Row Motorsports | Ford | 35 | 29 |
| 2011 | Front Row Motorsports | Ford | 40 | 32 |
| 2013 | BK Racing | Toyota | 43 | 25 |

==== Xfinity Series ====
NASCAR Xfinity Series results
| Year | Team | No. | Make | 1 | 2 | 3 | 4 | 5 | 6 | 7 | 8 | 9 | 10 | 11 | 12 | 13 | 14 | 15 | 16 | 17 | 18 | 19 | 20 | 21 | 22 | 23 | 24 | 25 | 26 | 27 | 28 | 29 | 30 | 31 | 32 | 33 | 34 | 35 | NXSC | Pts | Ref |
|---|---|---|---|---|---|---|---|---|---|---|---|---|---|---|---|---|---|---|---|---|---|---|---|---|---|---|---|---|---|---|---|---|---|---|---|---|---|---|---|---|---|
| 2001 | Richard Childress Racing | 21 | Chevy | DAY | CAR | LVS | ATL | DAR | BRI | TEX | NSH | TAL | CAL | RCH | NHA | NZH | CLT | DOV | KEN; 28 | MLW | GLN | CHI | GTY | PPR | IRP | MCH | BRI | DAR | RCH | DOV | KAN | CLT | MEM | PHO | CAR | HOM | | | 115th | 79 | |
| 2005 | NDS Motorsports | 77 | Dodge | DAY | CAL | MXC | LVS | ATL | NSH | BRI | TEX | PHO | TAL | DAR | RCH | CLT | DOV | NSH | KEN | MLW | DAY | CHI | NHA | PPR | GTY | IRP | GLN; 25 | MCH | BRI | CAL | RCH | DOV | KAN | CLT | MEM | TEX | PHO | HOM | 115th | 88 | |
| 2007 | JTG Racing | 47 | Ford | DAY | CAL | MXC | LVS | ATL | BRI | NSH | TEX | PHO | TAL | RCH | DAR | CLT | DOV; 31 | NSH | KEN | MLW | NHA | DAY | CHI | GTY | | | | | | | | | | | | | | | 111th | 170 | |
| 2007 | Roush Fenway Racing | 60 | Ford | | | | | | | | | | | | | | | | | | | | | | IRP; QL^{†} | CGV | GLN | MCH | | | | | | | | | | | 111th | 170 | |
| 2007 | Roush Fenway Racing | 16 | Ford | | | | | | | | | | | | | | | | | | | | | | | | | | BRI; 21 | CAL | RCH | DOV | KAN | CLT | MEM | TEX | PHO | HOM | 111th | 170 | |
| 2009 | RAB Racing | 09 | Ford | DAY | CAL | LVS | BRI | TEX | NSH | PHO | TAL | RCH | DAR | CLT | DOV | NSH | KEN | MLW | NHA | DAY | CHI | GTY | IRP | IOW | GLN | MCH | BRI | CGV | ATL | RCH; 20 | DOV | KAN | CAL | CLT | MEM | TEX | PHO | HOM | 128th | 103 | |
| 2016 | B. J. McLeod Motorsports | 15 | Ford | DAY | ATL | LVS | PHO | CAL | TEX | BRI | RCH; 25 | TAL; 25 | DOV; 30 | CLT | POC | MCH | | | KEN; 25 | NHA | IND | IOW | GLN | MOH | BRI; 20 | ROA | DAR | RCH | CHI; 33 | KEN | DOV | CLT | KAN | TEX | PHO | HOM; 26 | | | 113th | 0^{1} | |
| 2016 | Rick Ware Racing | 25 | Ford | | | | | | | | | | | | | | IOW; 23 | DAY | | | | | | | | | | | | | | | | | | | | | 113th | 0^{1} | |
^{†} - Qualified for Carl Edwards

==== Craftsman Truck Series ====
NASCAR Craftsman Truck Series results
| Year | Team | No. | Make | 1 | 2 | 3 | 4 | 5 | 6 | 7 | 8 | 9 | 10 | 11 | 12 | 13 | 14 | 15 | 16 | 17 | 18 | 19 | 20 | 21 | 22 | 23 | 24 | 25 | NGOTC | Pts | Ref |
|---|---|---|---|---|---|---|---|---|---|---|---|---|---|---|---|---|---|---|---|---|---|---|---|---|---|---|---|---|---|---|---|
| 2001 | Addington Racing | 60 | Chevy | DAY; 25 | HOM; 2 | MMR; 11 | MAR; 2 | GTY; 5 | DAR; 6 | PPR; 7 | DOV; 10 | TEX; 11 | MEM; 12 | MLW; 3 | KAN; 6 | KEN; 4 | NHA; 2 | IRP; 5 | NSH; 5 | CIC; 4 | NZH; 24 | RCH; 11 | SBO; 8 | TEX; 1 | LVS; 3 | PHO; 9 | CAL; 7 | | 4th | 3547 | |
| 2002 | Addington Racing | 60 | Chevy | DAY; 20 | DAR; 7 | MAR; 7 | GTY; 33 | PPR; 3 | DOV; 19 | TEX; 2 | MEM; 1^{*} | MLW; 10 | KAN; 25 | KEN; 16 | NHA; 7 | MCH; 3 | IRP; 3 | NSH; 30 | RCH; 11 | TEX; 5 | SBO; 5 | LVS; 4 | CAL; 4 | PHO; 4 | HOM; 15 | | | | 9th | 3039 | |
| 2003 | Xpress Motorsports | 16 | Chevy | DAY; 2 | DAR; 4 | MMR; 16 | MAR; 18 | CLT; 4 | DOV; 5 | TEX; 4 | MEM; 2 | MLW; 6 | KAN; 4 | KEN; 6 | GTW; 3 | MCH; 7 | IRP; 2 | NSH; 9 | BRI; 1 | RCH; 9 | NHA; 7 | CAL; 8 | LVS; 4 | SBO; 2 | TEX; 2 | MAR; 16 | PHO; 9 | HOM; 6 | 1st | 3837 | |
| 2004 | Bang! Racing | 24 | Toyota | DAY; 2 | ATL; 4 | MAR; 13 | MFD; 32 | CLT; 8 | DOV; 16 | TEX; 27 | MEM; 13 | MLW; 5 | KAN; 7 | KEN; 15 | GTW; 7 | MCH; 1 | IRP; 4 | NSH; 13 | BRI; 8 | RCH; 31 | NHA; 1 | LVS; 28 | **CAL**; 18 | TEX; 23 | MAR; 21 | PHO; 15 | DAR; 19 | HOM; 19 | 8th | 3152 | |
| 2007 | Roush Fenway Racing | 6 | Ford | DAY; 3 | CAL; 16 | ATL; 15 | MAR; 14 | KAN; 13 | CLT; 13 | MFD; 7 | DOV; 3 | TEX; 6 | **MCH**; 1 | MLW; 8 | MEM; 1^{*} | KEN; 2 | IRP; 3 | NSH; 1 | **BRI**; 11^{*} | GTW; 6 | NHA; 15 | **LVS**; 1 | TAL; 26 | MAR; 13 | ATL; 11 | TEX; 26 | PHO; 23 | HOM; 21 | 6th | 3511 | |
| 2008 | Roush Fenway Racing | 09 | Ford | DAY | CAL; 7 | ATL; 18 | MAR; 7 | KAN | CLT; 18 | MFD | DOV; 4 | TEX | MCH | MLW | MEM | KEN | IRP | NSH | BRI | GTW | NHA; 3 | LVS | TAL | MAR | ATL; 11 | TEX; 7 | PHO | HOM; 6 | 28th | 1276 | |
| 2009 | Billy Ballew Motorsports | 51 | Toyota | DAY | CAL | ATL | MAR | KAN | CLT | DOV | TEX | MCH | MLW | MEM | KEN | IRP | NSH; 11 | BRI | CHI | IOW | GTW | NHA | LVS | MAR | TAL | TEX | PHO | HOM | 77th | 130 | |
| 2010 | Rick Ware Racing | 16 | Chevy | DAY | ATL | MAR | NSH | KAN | DOV | CLT | TEX | MCH | IOW | GTY | IRP | POC | NSH | DAR | BRI | CHI | KEN | NHA | LVS | MAR | TAL | TEX | PHO | HOM; 15 | 92nd | 123 | |
| 2011 | Randy Moss Motorsports | 5 | Toyota | DAY; 29 | PHO; 36 | DAR; 17 | MAR; 20 | NSH; 20 | DOV; 23 | CLT; 11 | KAN; 10 | TEX; 12 | KEN; 10 | IOW | NSH | IRP | POC | MCH | BRI | ATL | CHI | NHA | KEN | LVS | TAL | MAR | TEX | HOM | 25th | 252 | |
| 2012 | RAB Racing | 09 | Toyota | DAY; 4 | MAR | CAR | KAN | CLT | DOV | TEX | KEN | IOW | CHI | POC | MCH | BRI | ATL | IOW | KEN | LVS | TAL | MAR | TEX | PHO | HOM | | | | 84th | 0^{1} | |
| 2013 | RSS Racing | 93 | Chevy | DAY | MAR | CAR | KAN | CLT | DOV | TEX | KEN | IOW | ELD | POC | MCH | BRI | MSP | IOW | CHI | LVS | TAL | MAR | TEX | PHO | HOM; 34 | | | | 115th | 0^{1} | |
| 2014 | MAKE Motorsports | 50 | Chevy | DAY; 22 | MAR; 23 | KAN | CLT | DOV | TEX | GTW | KEN | IOW | ELD | POC | | | | | | | | | | | | | | | 101st | 0^{1} | |
| 2014 | Athenian Motorsports | 05 | Toyota | | | | | | | | | | | | MCH; 26 | BRI | MSP | CHI | NHA | LVS | TAL | MAR | TEX | PHO | HOM | | | | 101st | 0^{1} | |
| 2015 | Premium Motorsports | 94 | Chevy | DAY; 15 | ATL | | | | | | | | | | | | | | | | | | | | | | | | 16th | 477 | |
| 2015 | MAKE Motorsports | 1 | Chevy | | | MAR; 32 | | | | | | | KEN; 14 | ELD; 30 | POC; 23 | MCH; 18 | | MSP; 24 | CHI; 24 | NHA; 17 | LVS; 18 | TAL; 27 | | TEX; 26 | | | | | 16th | 477 | |
| 2015 | MAKE Motorsports | 50 | Chevy | | | | KAN; 25 | CLT; 28 | DOV; 19 | TEX | GTW; 14 | IOW; 24 | | | | | BRI; 19 | | | | | | MAR; 15 | | PHO; 15 | HOM; 22 | | | 16th | 477 | |
| 2016 | MAKE Motorsports | 50 | Chevy | DAY; 5 | | MAR; DNQ | KAN; 20 | DOV; 23 | CLT; 30 | TEX; 24 | IOW; 27 | GTW; 12 | KEN; 25 | ELD; 17 | POC; 16 | BRI; 25 | MCH; 18 | MSP; 25 | CHI; 21 | NHA; 18 | LVS; 24 | TAL; 13 | MAR; 27 | TEX; 27 | PHO; 23 | | | | 16th | 257 | |
| 2016 | MAKE Motorsports | 1 | Chevy | | ATL; 23 | | | | | | | | | | | | | | | | | | | | | HOM; 27 | | | 16th | 257 | |
| 2017 | Beaver Motorsports | 50 | Chevy | DAY; 24 | ATL | MAR; 29 | KAN | CLT | DOV | | | | | | | | | | | | | | | | | | | | 36th | 68 | |
| 2017 | Bolen Motorsports | 66 | Chevy | | | | | | | TEX; 11 | GTW; 27 | IOW | KEN | ELD | | | | | | | | | | | | | | | 36th | 68 | |
| 2017 | MB Motorsports | 63 | Chevy | | | | | | | | | | | | POC; 26 | MCH | BRI | MSP | CHI | NHA | LVS | TAL | MAR | TEX | PHO | HOM | | | 36th | 68 | |
| 2018 | Beaver Motorsports | 50 | Chevy | DAY; 32 | ATL; DNQ | LVS | | | | | | | | | | | | | | | LVS; Wth | TAL | MAR | TEX | PHO | HOM | | | 88th | 5 | |
| 2018 | NextGen Motorsports | 35 | Chevy | | | | MAR; Wth | DOV | KAN | CLT | TEX | IOW | GTW | CHI | KEN | ELD | POC | MCH | BRI | MSP | | | | | | | | | 88th | 5 | |
| 2019 | Beaver Motorsports | 1 | Chevy | DAY; Wth | ATL; Wth | LVS | MAR; 28 | TEX | DOV; Wth | KAN | CLT | TEX | IOW | GTW | CHI | KEN | POC | ELD | MCH | BRI | MSP | LVS | TAL | MAR | PHO | HOM | | | 89th | 9 | |

=== ARCA Re/Max Series ===
(key) (Bold – Pole position awarded by qualifying time. Italics – Pole position earned by points standings or practice time. * – Most laps led.)

ARCA Re/Max Series results
| Year | Team | No. | Make | 1 | 2 | 3 | 4 | 5 | 6 | 7 | 8 | 9 | 10 | 11 | 12 | 13 | 14 | 15 | 16 | 17 | 18 | 19 | 20 | 21 | 22 | 23 | ARSC | Pts | Ref |
|---|---|---|---|---|---|---|---|---|---|---|---|---|---|---|---|---|---|---|---|---|---|---|---|---|---|---|---|---|---|
| 2005 | Penske Racing | 27 | Dodge | DAY | NSH | SLM | KEN | TOL | LAN | MIL | **POC**; 1* | MCH | KAN | KEN | BLN | POC | GTW | LER | NSH | MCH | ISF | TOL | DSF | CHI | SLM | TAL | 99th | 250 | |
| 2007 | Roush Fenway Racing | 99 | Ford | DAY | USA | NSH | SLM | KAN | WIN | KEN | TOL | IOW | POC; 33 | MCH | BLN | KEN | POC | NSH | ISF | MIL | GTW | DSF | CHI | SLM | TAL | TOL | 166th | 65 | |

^{*} Season still in progress
^{1} Ineligible for series points

Sporting positions
| Preceded by Mike Bliss | NASCAR Craftsman Truck Series Champion; 2003 | Succeeded by Bobby Hamilton |
Achievements
| Preceded by Kurt Busch | NASCAR Craftsman Truck Series Rookie of the Year; 2001 | Succeeded by Brendan Gaughan |
