= Steve Coulter =

Team owner in the NASCAR Craftsman Truck Series

- Born: May 21, 1947 (age 77)
- Occupation: NASCAR Craftsman Truck Series team owner
- Years active: 1996–2003

Steve Coulter is a former team owner in the NASCAR Craftsman Truck Series. His team, Xpress Motorsports, won the Truck Series championship in 2002 and 2003, with Mike Bliss and Travis Kvapil, respectively. He has also fielded cars in the Busch Series and part-time in the Winston Cup Series. He sold Xpress Motorsports to Dave Fuge in 2005.
