= Darrell Lanigan =

American racing driver

- Born: June 3, 1970 (age 56); Union, Kentucky, U.S.

NASCAR O'Reilly Auto Parts Series career
- 4 races run over 2 years
- Best finish: 68th (1996)
- First race: 1996 Dura Lube 200 (Darlington)
- Last race: 2000 Carquest Auto Parts 300 (Charlotte)
Wins	Top tens	Poles
0	0	0

ARCA Menards Series career
- 17 races run over 5 years
- Best finish: 34th (1999)
- First race: 1996 Daytona ARCA 200 (Daytona)
- Last race: 2001 EasyCare Vehicle Services Contracts 100 (Charlotte)
Wins	Top tens	Poles
0	9	1
- Statistics up to date as of December 17, 2024.

Darrell Lanigan (born June 3, 1970) is an American professional stock car racing driver who has competed in the NASCAR Busch Series and the ARCA Re/Max Series.

Lanigan has also previously competed in series such as the World of Outlaws, the Lucas Oil Late Model Dirt Series, the Stacker 2 Xtreme DirtCar Series, the Northern Xtreme DirtCar Series, and the DIRTcar Nationals.

== Motorsports results ==
=== NASCAR ===
(key) (Bold - Pole position awarded by qualifying time. Italics - Pole position earned by points standings or practice time. * – Most laps led.)

==== Busch Series ====
NASCAR Busch Series results
Year	Team	No.	Make	1	2	3	4	5	6	7	8	9	10	11	12	13	14	15	16	17	18	19	20	21	22	23	24	25	26	27	28	29	30	31	32	NBSC	Pts	Ref
1996	Triangle Racing	19	Ford	DAY	CAR	RCH	ATL	NSV	DAR	BRI	HCY	NZH	CLT	DOV	SBO	MYB	GLN	MLW	NHA	TAL	IRP	MCH	BRI	DAR; 26	RCH	DOV	CLT; 38	CAR; 31	HOM; DNQ							68th	204	
2000	Xpress Motorsports	61	Chevy	DAY	CAR	LVS	ATL	DAR	BRI	TEX	NSV	TAL	CAL	RCH	NHA	CLT; 38	DOV	SBO	MYB	GLN	MLW	NZH	PPR	GTY	IRP	MCH	BRI	DAR	RCH	DOV	CLT	CAR	MEM	PHO	HOM	110th	49	

=== ARCA Re/Max Series ===
(key) (Bold – Pole position awarded by qualifying time. Italics – Pole position earned by points standings or practice time. * – Most laps led. ** – All laps led.)

ARCA Re/Max Series results
Year	Team	No.	Make	1	2	3	4	5	6	7	8	9	10	11	12	13	14	15	16	17	18	19	20	21	22	23	24	25	ARMSC	Pts	Ref
1996	Lanigan Racing	29	Ford	DAY; 38	ATL; 29	SLM	TAL	FIF	LVL	CLT; 27	CLT; DNQ	KIL	FRS	POC	MCH	FRS	TOL	POC	MCH	INF	SBS	ISF	DSF	KIL	SLM	WIN	CLT	ATL	N/A	0	
1998	Lanigan Racing	29	Ford	DAY	ATL; 4	SLM	CLT; 7	MEM	MCH; 12	POC	SBS	TOL	PPR	POC	KIL	FRS	ISF	ATL	DSF	SLM	TEX	WIN	**CLT**; 30*	TAL	ATL; 4				N/A	0	
1999	Lanigan Racing	29	Ford	DAY	ATL; 2	SLM	AND	CLT; 2	MCH; 9	POC	TOL	SBS	BLN	POC; 10	KIL	FRS	FLM	ISF	WIN	DSF	SLM	CLT; 34	TAL	ATL; 29					34th	965	
2000	Lanigan Racing	29	Ford	DAY	SLM	AND	CLT; 32*	KIL	FRS	MCH	POC	TOL	KEN	BLN	POC	WIN	ISF	KEN	DSF	SLM	CLT	TAL	ATL; DNQ						115th	125	
2001	Lanigan Racing	29	Ford	DAY	NSH	WIN	SLM	GTY	KEN; 6	CLT; 6	KAN	MCH	POC	MEM	GLN	KEN	MCH	POC	NSH	ISF	CHI	DSF	SLM	TOL	BLN	CLT	TAL	ATL	81st	400	
