= Tony Roper (racing driver) =

American stock car racing driver (1964–2000)

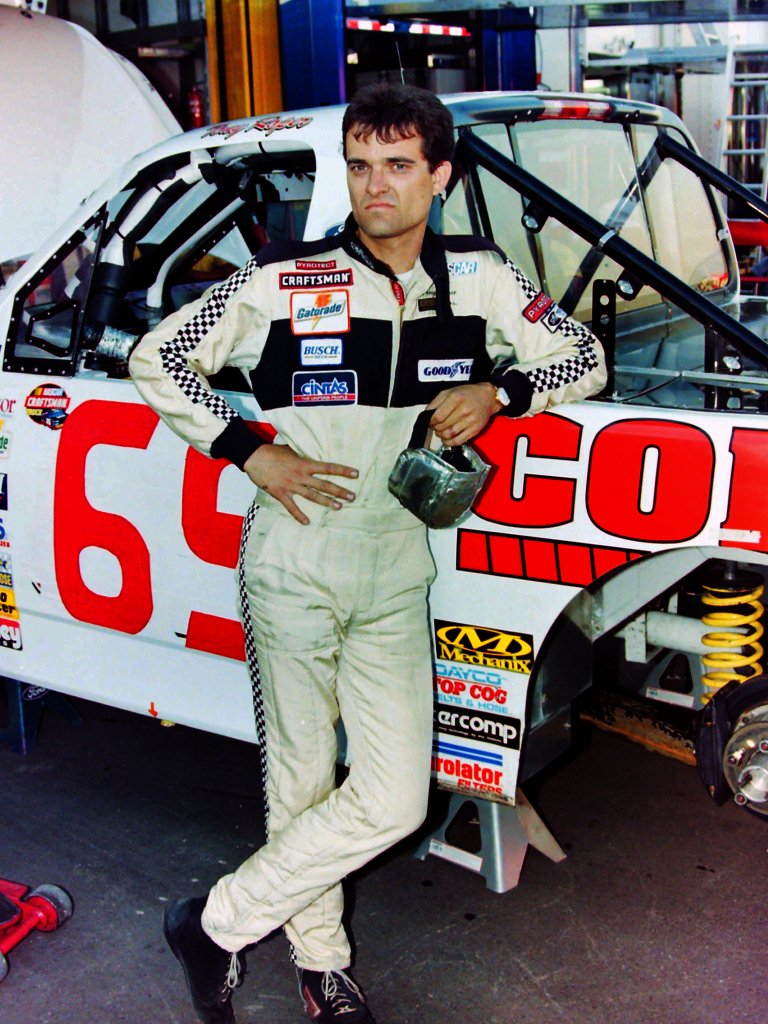
- Roper in 1997
- Born: Anthony Dean Roper; December 13, 1964; Springfield, Missouri, U.S.
- Died: October 14, 2000 (aged 35); Fort Worth, Texas, U.S.
- Cause of death: Neck injury from racing accident in the O'Reilly 400 at Texas Motor Speedway

NASCAR O'Reilly Auto Parts Series career
- 19 races run over 2 years
- Best finish: 41st (1999)
- First race: 1999 Diamond Hill Plywood 200 (Darlington)
- Last race: 2000 Touchstone Energy 300 (Talladega)
Wins	Top tens	Poles
0	3	0

NASCAR FedEx Freight Truck Series career
- 60 races run over 5 years
- Best finish: 16th (1998)
- First race: 1995 Sears Auto Center 125 (Milwaukee)
- Last race: 2000 O'Reilly 400 (Texas)
Wins	Top tens	Poles
0	8	0

Anthony Dean Roper (December 13, 1964 – October 14, 2000) was an American professional stock car racing driver. A competitor in the NASCAR Craftsman Truck Series, he died after suffering injuries in a racing accident at Texas Motor Speedway.

== Early career ==
Roper was born in Springfield, Missouri, to Dean Roper and Shirley Medley. Growing up, his family was heavily involved in auto racing, as his father was a noted competitor in ARCA and other stock car racing series. Roper started racing in 1986. For the next six years, he raced in IMCA Modifieds and late models on Midwest dirt and asphalt tracks. In 1992, he finished in second place for the American Speed Association Rookie of the Year Award. He started racing in the NASCAR Craftsman Truck Series in 1995, and the Busch Series in 1999.

== Death ==
At the Craftsman Truck Series O'Reilly 400 at Texas Motor Speedway on October 13, 2000, Roper was involved in an accident when he attempted to pass Steve Grissom and Rick Ware. Roper's Ford made contact with Grissom's front bumper causing it to take a sudden hard-right turn, which then caused the truck to impact the concrete wall of the tri-oval. An unconscious, unresponsive Roper was extricated from his truck, taken to the infield care center at TMS, and subsequently airlifted to Dallas's Parkland Memorial Hospital. Roper was determined to have a severe neck injury which prevented the flow of blood to his brain. He was put on a ventilator, and succumbed to the injury the day after the race, aged 35.

Roper was the third NASCAR driver to perish from racing related injuries in 2000, the first two being Adam Petty and Kenny Irwin Jr., respectively. It was the second fatality in the Craftsman Truck Series, the first being that of John Nemechek in 1997. Roper's was the first racing fatality recorded at Texas Motor Speedway.

A funeral service for Roper was held at the Fair Grove High School gymnasium, where he graduated from. More than 600 people attended.

Tony's father, Dean Roper, died in a crash just a year later (his death was caused by a heart attack, not the crash itself), on August 19, 2001. Both Tony and his father Dean died in racing accidents within ten months of each other.

== Aftermath ==
Roper was one of three drivers to be killed in the 2000 NASCAR season alone, after Busch Series driver Adam Petty and Winston Cup Series driver Kenny Irwin, Jr. lost their lives at New Hampshire due to basilar skull fractures. Despite these incidents, NASCAR did not immediately mandate a head restraint like the HANS device to protect drivers; after Dale Earnhardt was killed at Daytona and a later crash in an ARCA race at Charlotte took the life of Blaise Alexander, drivers were required to wear a restraint to protect themselves.

== Legacy ==
The Tony Roper Scholarship Fund was founded after Roper's death. As of now, it is still running to this day.

== Motorsports career results ==
=== NASCAR ===
(key) (Bold – Pole position awarded by qualifying time. Italics – Pole position earned by points standings or practice time. * – Most laps led.)

==== Busch Series ====
NASCAR Busch Series results
Year	Team	No.	Make	1	2	3	4	5	6	7	8	9	10	11	12	13	14	15	16	17	18	19	20	21	22	23	24	25	26	27	28	29	30	31	32	NBGNC	Pts	Ref
1999	Xpress Motorsports	61	Chevy	DAY	CAR	LVS	ATL	DAR; 40																												41st	1284	
1999	Xpress Motorsports	61	Pontiac						TEX; 16	NSV; 35	BRI; 10	TAL; 18	CAL; 30	NHA; 43	RCH; 18	NZH; 43	CLT; DNQ	DOV; 42	SBO; 8	GLN; 42	MLW; 10	MYB; 18	PPR; 40	GTY; 30	IRP; DNQ	MCH; DNQ	BRI; DNQ	DAR	RCH	DOV	CLT	CAR	MEM	PHO	HOM	41st	1284	
2000	Washington-Erving Motorsports	50	Chevy	DAY; DNQ	CAR; 37	LVS; DNQ	ATL; DNQ	DAR; DNQ	BRI; DNQ	TEX; DNQ	NSV; 31	TAL; 24	CAL; DNQ	RCH; DNQ	NHA; DNQ	CLT	DOV	SBO	MYB	GLN	MLW	NZH	PPR	GTY	IRP	MCH	BRI	DAR	RCH	DOV	CLT	CAR	MEM	PHO	HOM	82nd	213	

==== Craftsman Truck Series ====
NASCAR Craftsman Truck Series results
Year	Team	No.	Make	1	2	3	4	5	6	7	8	9	10	11	12	13	14	15	16	17	18	19	20	21	22	23	24	25	26	27	NCTC	Pts	Ref
1995	MB Motorsports	26	Ford	PHO	TUS	SGS	MMR	POR	EVG	I70	LVL	BRI	MLW; 22	CNS	HPT	IRP	FLM	RCH; DNQ	MAR; 27	NWS	SON	MMR	PHO								60th	219	
1997	Brevak Racing	31	Ford	WDW; 32	TUS; DNQ	HOM; 12	PHO; 36	POR; 23	EVG; 15	I70; 9	NHA; 19	TEX; 20	BRI; 17	NZH; 33	MLW; 17	LVL; 20	CNS; 13	HPT; 25	IRP; 33	FLM; 9	NSV; 17	GLN; 24	RCH; 27	MAR; 21	SON; 17	MMR; 13	CAL; 14	PHO; 24	LVS; 27		18th	2604	
1997	Brevak Racing	34	Ford		TUS; 29																										18th	2604	
1998	Brevak Racing	31	Ford	WDW; 28	HOM; 36	PHO; 12	POR; 10	EVG; 6	I70; 8	GLN; 30	TEX; 11																				16th	3016	
1998	Gloy-Rahal Racing	55	Ford									BRI; 15	MLW; 18	NZH; 12	CAL; 18	PPR; 10	IRP; 2	NHA; 36	FLM; 14	NSV; 21	HPT; 24	LVL; 6	RCH; 13	MEM; 17	GTY; 15	MAR; 18	SON; 12	MMR; 16	PHO; 25	LVS; 38	16th	3016	
1999	Gloy-Rahal Racing	55	Ford	HOM	PHO	EVG	MMR	MAR	MEM	PPR	I70	BRI	TEX	PIR	GLN	MLW	NSV	NZH	MCH	NHA	IRP	GTY	HPT	RCH	LVS	LVL; 18	TEX	CAL			89th	109	
2000	MB Motorsports	26	Ford	DAY	HOM	PHO	MMR	MAR	PIR	GTY	MEM	PPR	EVG	TEX	KEN	GLN	MLW	NHA	NZH	MCH	IRP; 30	NSV; 34	CIC	RCH; 21	DOV; DNQ	TEX; 29	CAL				54th	356	
