= NASCAR Truck Series at Texas Motor Speedway =

NASCAR Truck Series races at Texas Motor Speedway

NASCAR Truck Series
- Venue: Texas Motor Speedway
- Location: Fort Worth, Texas, United States

Circuit information
- Surface: Asphalt
- Length: 1.5 mi (2.4 km)
- Turns: 4

Stock car racing events in the NASCAR Truck Series have been held at Texas Motor Speedway, in Fort Worth, Texas during numerous seasons and times of year since 1997.

== Current race ==
SpeedyCash.com 250

NASCAR Truck Series
- Corporate sponsor: Speedy Cash
- First race: 1997
- Distance: 250.5 miles (403.1 km)
- Laps: 167; Stages 1/2: 40 each Final stage: 87
- Previous names: Pronto Auto Parts 400K (1997–2000); O'Reilly 400K (2001–2004); Chex 400K (2005); Sam's Town 400 (2006–2008); Winstar World Casino 400 (2009); Winstar World Casino 400K (2010–2013); WinStar World Casino & Resort 400 (2014–2015); Rattlesnake 400 (2016) winstaronlinegaming.com 400 (2017); PPG 400 (2018); SpeedyCash.com 400 (2019–2020); SpeedyCash.com 220 (2021–2022)
- Most wins (driver): Todd Bodine (4)
- Most wins (team): Germain Racing; Kyle Busch Motorsports (4)
- Most wins (manufacturer): Toyota (13)

Circuit information
- Surface: Asphalt
- Length: 1.5 mi (2.4 km)
- Turns: 4

The SpeedyCash.com 250 is an annual NASCAR Truck Series race held at the Texas Motor Speedway near Fort Worth, Texas. Carson Hocevar is the defending race winner.

=== History ===
The race was originally a standalone race for NASCAR in the month of June that shared a weekend with the track's IndyCar Series race, the PPG 375. In 2021, the NASCAR Cup and Xfinity Series' spring race weekend at Texas, usually in late March or early-to-mid-April, was removed from the schedule and both series joined the Truck Series on the June weekend. The Cup Series race would now be their All-Star Race, which was previously held at Charlotte Motor Speedway. The distance was also shortened from 250.5 miles (403.14 km) to 220.5 miles in 2021, and the race name was changed to reflect the miles (which is the case for most NASCAR races) instead of the kilometers. The race was now 147 laps in length (with the first 2 stages being 35 laps each and the final stage being 77 laps) with the shortened distance.

In 2023, NASCAR moved the Cup Series All-Star Race from Texas to the reopened North Wilkesboro Speedway and the Truck Series race at Texas became a standalone race as it was from 2019 on back. As was also the case for the previous Truck Series standalone races at Texas, the race was held on the same weekend as the track's IndyCar race. Unlike the previous Truck Series/IndyCar race weekends which were in June, their 2023 race weekend was in April. Additionally, the race length of the Truck Series race was increased from 220 miles to 250 miles that year (its former distance from 2020 on back).

=== Past winners ===
Year	Date	No.	Driver	Team	Manufacturer	Race Distance		Race Time	Average Speed (mph)	Report	Ref
Year	Date	No.	Driver	Team	Manufacturer	Laps	Miles (km)	Race Time	Average Speed (mph)	Report	Ref
1997	June 6	98	Kenny Irwin Jr.	Liberty Racing	Ford	167	250.5 (403.14)	1:54:01	131.823	Report	
1998	June 5	19	Tony Raines	Roehrig Motorsports	Ford	167	250.5 (403.14)	2:15:23	111.018	Report	
1999	June 11	1	Dennis Setzer	K Automotive Racing	Dodge	167	250.5 (403.14)	2:21:11	122.805	Report	
2000	June 9	50	Greg Biffle	Roush Racing	Ford	167	250.5 (403.14)	1:58:24	126.932	Report	
2001	June 8	24	Jack Sprague	Hendrick Motorsports	Chevrolet	167	250.5 (403.14)	1:52:29	133.62	Report	
2002	June 7	62	Brendan Gaughan	Orleans Racing	Dodge	167	250.5 (403.14)	1:56:00	129.569	Report	
2003	June 7	62	Brendan Gaughan	Orleans Racing	Dodge	167	250.5 (403.14)	1:46:53	140.621	Report	
2004	June 11	46	Dennis Setzer	Morgan-Dollar Motorsports	Chevrolet	167	250.5 (403.14)	1:40:54	148.959	Report	
2005	June 10	16	Jack Sprague	Xpress Motorsports	Chevrolet	167	250.5 (403.14)	1:43:46	144.844	Report	
2006	June 9	30	Todd Bodine	Germain Racing	Toyota	168*	252 (405.554)	1:54:26	132.129	Report	
2007	June 8	30	Todd Bodine	Germain Racing	Toyota	169*	253.5 (407.968)	2:08:50	118.057	Report	
2008	June 6	33	Ron Hornaday Jr.	Kevin Harvick Inc.	Chevrolet	172*	258 (415.21)	2:20:44	109.988	Report	
2009	June 5	30	Todd Bodine	Germain Racing	Toyota	167	250.5 (403.14)	1:38:09	153.133	Report	
2010	June 4	30	Todd Bodine	Germain Racing	Toyota	169*	253.5 (407.968)	1:59:33	125.739	Report	
2011	June 10	33	Ron Hornaday Jr.	Kevin Harvick Inc.	Chevrolet	168*	252 (405.554)	2:15:18	111.752	Report	
2012	June 8	13	Johnny Sauter	ThorSport Racing	Toyota	167	250.5 (403.14)	2:01:17	123.925	Report	
2013	June 7	4	Jeb Burton	Turner Scott Motorsports	Chevrolet	167	250.5 (403.14)	1:45:07	142.984	Report	
2014	June 6	88	Matt Crafton	ThorSport Racing	Toyota	167	250.5 (403.14)	1:53:02	132.97	Report	
2015	June 5	88	Matt Crafton	ThorSport Racing	Toyota	167	250.5 (403.14)	1:51:50	134.396	Report	
2016	June 10	9	William Byron	Kyle Busch Motorsports	Toyota	167	250.5 (403.14)	1:51:24	134.919	Report	
2017	June 9	4	Christopher Bell	Kyle Busch Motorsports	Toyota	167	250.5 (403.14)	2:05:52	119.412	Report	
2018	June 8	21	Johnny Sauter	GMS Racing	Chevrolet	167	250.5 (403.14)	2:09:57	115.66	Report	
2019	June 7	51	Greg Biffle	Kyle Busch Motorsports	Toyota	167	250.5 (403.14)	2:29:39	100.434	Report	
2020	October 25*	2	Sheldon Creed	GMS Racing	Chevrolet	152*	228 (366.929)	2:08:00	106.875	Report	
2021	June 12	4	John Hunter Nemechek	Kyle Busch Motorsports	Toyota	147	220.5 (354.9)	1:55:17	114.761	Report	
2022	May 20	52	Stewart Friesen	Halmar Friesen Racing	Toyota	149*	223.5 (359.728)	1:55:02	116.575	Report	
2023	April 1	42	Carson Hocevar	Niece Motorsports	Chevrolet	172*	258 (415.21)	2:34:45	99.39	Report	
2024	April 12	7	Kyle Busch	Spire Motorsports	Chevrolet	167	250.5 (403.14)	2:06:52	118.471	Report	
2025	May 2	11	Corey Heim	Tricon Garage	Toyota	174*	261 (420.039)	2:33:31	102.008	Report	
2026	May 1	77	Carson Hocevar	Spire Motorsports	Chevrolet	172*	258 (415.21)	2:17:05	112.924	Report	
2027	April 30									Report	

- 2006–2008, 2010–2011, 2020, 2022–2023, 2025 & 2026: The race was extended due to a NASCAR Overtime finish.
- 2020: Race postponed from June 5 to October 25 due to the COVID-19 pandemic.

==== Multiple winners (drivers) ====
# Wins	Driver	Years won
4	Todd Bodine	2006, 2007, 2009, 2010
2	Dennis Setzer	1999, 2004
2	Jack Sprague	2001, 2005
2	Brendan Gaughan	2002, 2003
2	Ron Hornaday Jr.	2008, 2011
2	Matt Crafton	2014, 2015
2	Johnny Sauter	2012, 2018
2	Greg Biffle	2000, 2019
2	Carson Hocevar	2023, 2026

==== Multiple winners (teams) ====
# Wins	Team	Years won
4	Germain Racing	2006, 2007, 2009, 2010
4	Kyle Busch Motorsports	2016, 2017, 2019, 2021
3	ThorSport Racing	2012, 2014, 2015
2	Orleans Racing	2002, 2003
2	Kevin Harvick Inc.	2008, 2011
2	GMS Racing	2018, 2020
2	Spire Motorsports	2024, 2026

==== Manufacturer wins ====
# Wins	Make	Years won
13	(Japan) Toyota	2006, 2007, 2009, 2010, 2012, 2014-2017, 2019, 2021, 2022, 2025
11	(United States) Chevrolet	2001, 2004, 2005, 2008, 2011, 2013, 2018, 2020, 2023, 2024, 2026
3	(United States) Ford	1997, 1998, 2000
3	(United States) Dodge	1999, 2002, 2003

== Former race ==
Vankor 350
- Corporate sponsor: Vankor
- First race: 1999
- Last race: 2020
- Distance: 220.5 miles (354.9 km)
- Laps: 147 (Stage 1: 35 Stage 2: 35 Stage 3: 77)
- Previous names: O'Reilly 300 (1999); O'Reilly 400 (2000); Silverado 350 (2001–2003); Silverado 350K (2004–2008); WinStar World Casino 350 (2009, 2012–2013); WinStar World Casino 350K (2010–2011); WinStar World Casino & Resort 350 (2014–2015); Striping Technology 350 (2016); JAG Metals 350 (2017–2018)
- Most wins (driver): Kyle Busch (5)
- Most wins (team): Kyle Busch Motorsports (5)
- Most wins (manufacturer): Chevrolet; Toyota (10)

The Vankor 350 was a NASCAR Gander RV & Outdoors Truck Series race at Texas Motor Speedway. The 1999 race was 300 kilometers and the 2000 race was 400 kilometers, and became 350 kilometers in 2001. The race moved to the spring for the 2019 season.

=== Past winners ===
Year	Date	No.	Driver	Team	Manufacturer	Race Distance		Race Time	Average Speed (mph)	Report	Ref
Year	Date	No.	Driver	Team	Manufacturer	Laps	Miles (km)	Race Time	Average Speed (mph)	Report	Ref
1999	October 15	3	Jay Sauter	Richard Childress Racing	Chevrolet	125	187.5 (301.752)	1:24:57	132.43	Report	
2000*	October 13	3	Bryan Reffner	Team Menard	Chevrolet	167	250.5 (403.14)	2:13:01	112.933	Report	
2001	October 5*	60	Travis Kvapil	Addington Racing	Chevrolet	146	219 (352.446)	1:57:18	112.02	Report	
2002	September 13	62	Brendan Gaughan	Orleans Racing	Dodge	146	219 (352.446)	1:35:24	137.736	Report	
2003	October 11	62	Brendan Gaughan	Orleans Racing	Dodge	146	219 (352.446)	1:47:04	122.727	Report	
2004	October 16	30	Todd Bodine	Germain Racing	Toyota	146	219 (352.446)	1:54:06	115.169	Report	
2005	November 4	30	Todd Bodine	Germain Racing	Toyota	147	220.5 (354.86)	1:43:10	128.259	Report	
2006	November 3	46	Clint Bowyer	Morgan-Dollar Motorsports	Chevrolet	148*	222 (357.274)	1:46:39	124.895	Report	
2007	November 2	9	Ted Musgrave	Germain Racing	Toyota	149*	223.5 (359.688)	1:42:05	131.363	Report	
2008	October 31	33	Ron Hornaday Jr.	Kevin Harvick Inc.	Chevrolet	147	220.5 (354.86)	1:44:49	126.22	Report	
2009	November 6	51	Kyle Busch	Billy Ballew Motorsports	Toyota	147	220.5 (354.86)	1:30:26	146.296	Report	
2010	November 5	18	Kyle Busch	Kyle Busch Motorsports	Toyota	147	220.5 (354.86)	1:39:57	132.366	Report	
2011	November 4	2	Kevin Harvick	Kevin Harvick Inc.	Chevrolet	148*	222 (357.274)	1:49:50	121.275	Report	
2012	November 2	13	Johnny Sauter	ThorSport Racing	Toyota	147	220.5 (354.86)	1:25:30	154.737	Report	
2013	November 1	3	Ty Dillon	Richard Childress Racing	Chevrolet	147	220.5 (354.86)	1:30:53	145.571	Report	
2014	October 31	51	Kyle Busch	Kyle Busch Motorsports	Toyota	152*	228 (366.93)	1:55:05	118.87	Report	
2015	November 6	4	Erik Jones	Kyle Busch Motorsports	Toyota	147	220.5 (354.86)	1:23:44	158.002	Report	
2016	November 4	21	Johnny Sauter	GMS Racing	Chevrolet	147	220.5 (354.86)	1:29:13	148.291	Report	
2017	November 3	21	Johnny Sauter	GMS Racing	Chevrolet	147	220.5 (354.86)	1:40:42	131.38	Report	
2018	November 2	24	Justin Haley	GMS Racing	Chevrolet	147	220.5 (354.86)	1:51:07	119.064	Report	
2019	March 29	51	Kyle Busch	Kyle Busch Motorsports	Toyota	147	220.5 (354.86)	2:03:44	106.923	Report	
2020	July 18*	51	Kyle Busch	Kyle Busch Motorsports	Toyota	167	250.5 (403.14)	1:53:41	132.209	Report	

- 2000: Greg Biffle clinched the 2000 series title in this race; additionally, driver Tony Roper was severely injured in a crash on lap 33, and died the following day, becoming the third NASCAR fatality that year.
- 2001: Race postponed from September 15 because of the September 11 attacks.
- 2006, 2007, 2011 & 2014: Race extended because of a green–white–checker finish.
- 2020: Race postponed from March 27 to July 18 due to the COVID-19 pandemic. Even though the race kept its name, the distance was that of the race run in June, which is 400 kilometers/167 laps.

==== Multiple winners (drivers) ====
# Wins	Driver	Years won
5	Kyle Busch	2009, 2010, 2014, 2019, 2020
3	Johnny Sauter	2012, 2016, 2017
2	Brendan Gaughan	2002, 2003
2	Todd Bodine	2004, 2005

==== Multiple winners (teams) ====
# Wins	Team	Years won
5	Kyle Busch Motorsports	2010, 2014, 2015, 2019, 2020
3	Germain Racing	2004, 2005, 2007
3	GMS Racing	2016, 2017, 2018
2	Orleans Racing	2002, 2003
2	Kevin Harvick Inc.	2008, 2012
2	Richard Childress Racing	1999, 2013

==== Manufacturer wins ====
# Wins	Make	Years won
10	(United States) Chevrolet	1999, 2000, 2001, 2006, 2008, 2011, 2013, 2016, 2017, 2018
10	(Japan) Toyota	2004, 2005, 2007, 2009, 2010, 2012, 2014, 2015, 2019, 2020
2	(United States) Dodge	2002, 2003

Previous race: Tennessee Army National Guard 250	NASCAR Craftsman Truck Series; SpeedyCash.com 250	Next race: TBA
