= Xpress Motorsports =

Former NASCAR team

- Owner(s): Steve Coulter (1996–2003); Dave Fuge Sr (2004–2006); Joe Scott (2007–2009)
- Base: Charlotte, North Carolina
- Series: Winston Cup, Busch Series, Craftsman Truck Series
- Race drivers: Mike Bliss, Randy Tolsma, Jack Sprague, Travis Kvapil, Brian Scott
- Manufacturer: Chevrolet; Ford; Toyota
- Opened: 1996
- Closed: 2009

Career
- Drivers' Championships: 2 – Craftsman Truck Series (2002, 2003)
- Race victories: 12

Xpress Motorsports was a NASCAR Craftsman Truck Series team. The team won the Truck Series championship in 2002 and 2003 with Mike Bliss and Travis Kvapil, respectively. The team was owned by Steve Coulter until 2004, when he sold the team to its then manager Dave Fuge Sr. Fuge Sr owned the team until 2007 when he sold it to Joe Scott. In late 2009 the team was again sold to Sprint Cup Series driver Kyle Busch.

== Beginnings ==
Xpress was formed in 1996, when Coulter founded the team to promote his company, IWX Motor Freight. Randy Tolsma was hired to drive the No. 61 Chevrolet Silverado at Phoenix, and finished 29th after an early crash. Tolsma was named the team's full-time driver in 1997, but only qualified for one-third of the first nine races of the season. Dave Fuge was hired as Crew Chief to rebuild the team and they rebounded to capture his first career win at Mesa Marin Raceway. The team continued to run in 1998 with Tolsma driving and had ten top-tens and one pole position when they announced they were closing down their truck team at the end of the season to run the Busch Series. Tolsma left after 22 races, and they switched to the No. 61, fielding entries for Rick McCray, Stan Boyd, Blake Bainbridge.

They began running the Busch Series with the No. 61 Pontiac Grand Prix in 1998, fielding one race for Derrike Cope. Cope qualified for three out of four races and had a best finish of fifteenth in 1999 before he was replaced by rookie driver Tony Roper. Roper posted three top-tens in sixteen starts but departed the team near the end of the season. Robert Pressley, Morgan Shepherd, and Stanton Barrett drove the car for the rest of the season, with Shepherd posting a tenth-place finish at North Carolina Motor Speedway. Hut Stricklin was hired as the team's driver for the 2000 season and opened the year with a pole at the NAPA Auto Parts 300 but was released ten races into the season. After Darrell Lanigan ran a one-race deal at Lowe's Motor Speedway, they did not run until the Brickyard 400 Winston Cup race, when they failed to qualify with Rich Bickle driving. They returned to Busch at the end of the season, when Tim Sauter joined them with sponsorship from Stoops Freightliner. His best finish was fifteenth at Homestead-Miami Speedway.

== Rebirth ==
Sauter was named the team's permanent driver in 2001 and competed for NASCAR Rookie of the Year honors with Xpress, which was running Pontiacs and Chevrolets. After crew chief Dave Fuge Sr was fined for a rules violation following the Outback Steakhouse 300 at Kentucky, the team closed its doors immediately and stopped running. Later in the season, Fuge Sr decided to revive the team, and ran a one-race deal with Mike Bliss at South Boston Speedway, where he finished ninth.

Without the guarantee of funding from Coulter, Xpress decided to make a full-time run with Mike Bliss in 2002. They won five races and the Truck Series championship. In addition, they fielded a second entry for the first time in team history at the Ford 200, with Ron Hornaday Jr. winning in the team's No. 11 entry. Bliss moved to the Busch Series for 2003 and Travis Kvapil joined Xpress from Addington Racing. Kvapil won just one race that season and had already announced he was departing the team for Bang! Racing in 2004 when he won the championship at the season-finale at Homestead, giving Xpress its second consecutive title.

Three-time champion Jack Sprague, who had driven the No. 11 in two races in 2003, joined the team full-time in 2004 with Chevy Trucks coming on as a full-time backer. Sprague won the inaugural UAW/GM Ohio 250 and finished seventh in points. In 2005, Coulter sold the team to Fuge, and Xpress attempted to field the No. 19 truck in addition to the No. 16 with rookie Regan Smith driving, but the team dissolved after three races. Sprague won at Texas Motor Speedway, but left the team near the end of the season, and Bliss finished the rest of the year for the team, finishing fourth at Homestead. He ran with Xpress full-time with decreased support from Chevy, picking up a win at Atlanta Motor Speedway.

Xpress switched to the Ford F-150 and began a variety of drivers racing in the 2007 season. Stacy Compton, Kelly Bires, Kenny Hendrick, Scott Lagasse Jr., Chris Fontaine, Mike Bliss, and Derrike Cope all raced 16, with Hendrick making the most starts. Travis Kittleson drove the second No. 19 truck at O'Reilly Raceway Park, but finished last. In September 2007, J. B. and Brian Scott bought a majority interest of the team, with Brian Scott driving the remaining races except for Talladega, as Scott had not been approved by NASCAR to run superspeedways. Cope ran in his place. Scott was to run for Rookie of the Year in the Trucks in 2008 with sponsorship from Shark Energy Drink and Albertson's. However, Shark Energy ended its program with Xpress and Fitz Motorsports in March 2008. On September 2, it was announced that Xpress would enter a technological allegiance with Bill Davis Racing and switching manufacturers to Toyota starting at the Qwik Liner Las Vegas 350. Scott scored five top tens in the final seven races of that year and won his first race at Dover in 2009. In 2009 the team was sold again to become Kyle Busch Motorsports.

== Motorsports results ==
=== Winston Cup Series ===
==== Car No. 61 results ====
Year	Driver	No.	Make	1	2	3	4	5	6	7	8	9	10	11	12	13	14	15	16	17	18	19	20	21	22	23	24	25	26	27	28	29	30	31	32	33	34	Owners	Pts
2000	Rich Bickle	61	Chevy	DAY	CAR	LVS	ATL	DAR	BRI	TEX	MAR	TAL	CAL	RCH	CLT	DOV	MCH	POC	SON	DAY	NHA	POC	IND; DNQ	GLN	MCH	BRI	DAR	RCH	NHA	DOV	MAR	CLT	TAL	CAR	PHO	HOM		66th	18
2000	Tim Sauter	61	Chevy																																		ATL; DNQ	66th	18

=== Busch Series ===
==== Car No. 61 results ====
Year	Driver	No.	Make	1	2	3	4	5	6	7	8	9	10	11	12	13	14	15	16	17	18	19	20	21	22	23	24	25	26	27	28	29	30	31	32	33	Owners	Pts
1998	Derrike Cope	61	Pontiac	DAY	CAR	LVS	NSV	DAR	BRI	TEX	HCY	TAL	NHA	NZH	CLT	DOV	RCH	PPR	GLN	MLW	MYB	CAL	SBO	IRP	MCH	BRI	DAR	RCH	DOV	CLT	GTY	CAR	ATL; 36	HOM			90th	55
1999	Derrike Cope	61	Pontiac	DAY; DNQ	CAR; 15	LVS; 23	ATL; 35																														27th	2324
1999	Tony Roper	61	Chevy					DAR; 40																													27th	2324
1999	Tony Roper	61	Pontiac						TEX; 16	NSV; 35	BRI; 10	TAL; 18	CAL; 30	NHA; 43	RCH; 18	NZH; 43	CLT; DNQ	DOV; 42	SBO; 8	GLN; 42	MLW; 10	MYB; 18	PPR; 40	GTY; 30	IRP; DNQ	MCH; DNQ	BRI; DNQ										27th	2324
1999	Robert Pressley	61	Pontiac																									DAR; 18	RCH; 28	DOV; 17	CLT; DNQ						27th	2324
1999	Morgan Shepherd	61	Pontiac																													CAR; 10					27th	2324
1999	Stanton Barrett	61	Pontiac																														MEM; 24	PHO; 23	HOM; 43		27th	2324
2000	Hut Stricklin	61	Pontiac	DAY; 36	CAR; DNQ	LVS; 10	ATL; 11	DAR; 26	BRI; 38	TEX; 37	NSV; 17	TAL; 6	CAL; 36	RCH	NHA																						47th	1228
2000	Darrell Lanigan	61	Chevy													CLT; 38	DOV	SBO	MYB	GLN	MLW	NZH	PPR	GTY	IRP	MCH	BRI	DAR									47th	1228
2000	Tim Sauter	61	Chevy																										RCH; DNQ	DOV	CLT	CAR; DNQ		PHO; 21	HOM; 15		47th	1228
2000	Tim Sauter	61	Pontiac																														MEM; 29				47th	1228
2001	Tim Sauter	61	Pontiac	DAY; 10								TAL; 15																									38th	1483
2001	Tim Sauter	61	Chevy		CAR; 21	LVS; 13	ATL; 34	DAR; 29	BRI; 9	TEX; 34	NSH; 17		CAL; 25	RCH; 23	NHA; 16	NZH; 22	CLT; 23	DOV; 22	KEN; 43	MLW	GLN	CHI	GTY	PPR	IRP	MCH	BRI	DAR	RCH	DOV	KAN	CLT	MEM	PHO	CAR	HOM	38th	1483

=== Camping World Truck Series ===
==== Primary Truck results ====
Year	Driver	No.	Make	1	2	3	4	5	6	7	8	9	10	11	12	13	14	15	16	17	18	19	20	21	22	23	24	25	26	27	Owners	Pts
1996	Randy Tolsma	61	Chevy	HOM	PHO	POR	EVG	TUS	CNS	HPT	BRI	NZH	MLW	LVL	I70	IRP	FLM	GLN	NSV	RCH	NHA	MAR	NWS	SON	MMR	PHO; 29	LVS; DNQ					
1997	Randy Tolsma	61	Chevy	WDW; DNQ	TUS; 19	HOM; DNQ	PHO; DNQ	POR	EVG; 26	I70; DNQ	NHA	TEX; 8	BRI	NZH	MLW; 31	LVL	CNS	HPT; 15	IRP; 6	FLM	NSV; 32	GLN; 32	RCH; 9	MAR; 14	SON; 18	MMR; 1	CAL; 5	PHO; 33	LVS; 30		25th	1802
1998	Randy Tolsma	61	Chevy	WDW; 20	HOM; 37	PHO; 10	POR; 2	EVG; 3	I70; 17	GLN; 9	TEX; 25	BRI; 5	MLW; 12	NZH; 18	CAL; 6	PPR; 9	IRP; 6	NHA; 25	FLM; 26	NSV; 6	HPT; 25	LVL; 22	RCH; 7	MEM; 13	GTY; 16						17th	3029
1998	Randy Renfrow	61	Chevy																							MAR; 9	SON				17th	3029
1998	Stan Boyd	61	Ford																									MMR; 33			17th	3029
1998	Rick McCray	61	Chevy																										PHO; 28		17th	3029
1998	Blake Bainbridge	61	Chevy																											LVS; 33	17th	3029
2001	Mike Bliss	16	Chevy	DAY	HOM	MMR	MAR	GTY	DAR	PPR	DOV	TEX	MEM	MLW	KAN	KEN	NHA	IRP	NSH	CIC	NZH	RCH	SBO; 9	TEX	LVS	PHO	CAL				53rd	375
2002	Mike Bliss	16	Chevy	DAY; 33	DAR; 3	MAR; 2	GTY; 3	PPR; 1	DOV; 5	TEX; 12	MEM; 18	MLW; 8	KAN; 1	KEN; 1*	NHA; 10	MCH; 4	IRP; 15	NSH; 1	RCH; 3	TEX; 9	SBO; 1	LVS; 2*	CAL; 9	PHO; 10	HOM; 5						1st	3359
2003	Travis Kvapil	16	Chevy	DAY; 2	DAR; 4	MMR; 16	MAR; 18	CLT; 4	DOV; 5	TEX; 4	MEM; 2	MLW; 6	KAN; 4	KEN; 6	GTW; 3	MCH; 7	IRP; 2	NSH; 9	BRI; 1	RCH; 9	NHA; 7	CAL; 8	LVS; 4	SBO; 2	TEX; 2	MAR; 16	PHO; 9	HOM; 6			1st	3837
2004	Jack Sprague	16	Chevy	DAY; 25	ATL; 24	MAR; 3	MFD; 1	CLT; 26	DOV; 9	TEX; 4	MEM; 7	MLW; 35	KAN; 8	KEN; 2	GTW; 29	MCH; 27	IRP; 18	NSH; 14	BRI; 28	RCH; 8	NHA; 2	LVS; 36	CAL; 3	TEX; 5	MAR; 28	PHO; 2	DAR; 11	HOM; 7			7th	3167
2005	Jack Sprague	16	Chevy	DAY; 13	CAL; 22	ATL; 8	MAR; 11	GTY; 20	MFD; 2	CLT; 27	DOV; 29	TEX; 1	MCH; 10	MLW; 2	KAN; 30	KEN; 36	MEM; 13	IRP; 9	NSH; 21	BRI; 3	RCH; 26	NHA; 15	LVS; 4								13th	2999
2005	Bobby Labonte	16	Chevy																					MAR; 22							13th	2999
2005	Mike Bliss	16	Chevy																						ATL; 36	TEX; 22	PHO; 10	HOM; 4			13th	2999
2006	Mike Bliss	16	Chevy	DAY; 22	CAL; 7	ATL; 7	MAR; 5	GTY; 9	CLT; 33	MFD; 8	DOV; 4	TEX; 10	MCH; 14	MLW; 2	KAN; 31	KEN; 15	MEM; 5	IRP; 5	NSH; 30	BRI; 8	NHA; 16	LVS; 3	TAL; 25	MAR; 22	ATL; 1*	TEX; 27	PHO; 11	HOM; 30			12th	3151
2007	Stacy Compton	16	Ford	DAY; 17		ATL; 16	MAR; 21																								27th	2406
2007	Kelly Bires	16	Ford		CAL; 29																										27th	2406
2007	Kenny Hendrick	16	Chevy					KAN; 35																							27th	2406
2007	Kenny Hendrick	16	Ford													KEN; 34	IRP; 19	NSH; 34													27th	2406
2007	Mike Bliss	16	Ford						CLT; 6																						27th	2406
2007	Chris Fontaine	16	Ford							MFD; 17																					27th	2406
2007	Chris Fontaine	16	Chevy												MEM; 20																27th	2406
2007	Scott Lagasse Jr.	16	Ford								DOV; 21																				27th	2406
2007	Derrike Cope	16	Ford									TEX; 31							BRI; 29	GTY; 29			TAL; 12								27th	2406
2007	Boston Reid	16	Ford										MCH; 35																		27th	2406
2007	Benny Gordon	16	Ford											MLW; 15																	27th	2406
2007	Brian Scott	16	Ford																		NHA; 21	LVS; 29		MAR; 15	ATL; 19	TEX; 21	PHO; 18	HOM; 15			27th	2406
2008	Brian Scott	16	Chevy	DAY; 9	CAL; 23	ATL; 17	MAR; 30	KAN; 14	CLT; 35	MFD; 25	DOV; 32	TEX; 13	MCH; 25	MLW; 32	MEM; 13	KEN; 32	IRP; 29	NSH; 14	BRI; 19	GTW; 14	NHA; 8										19th	2787
2008	Brian Scott	16	Toyota																			LVS; 14	TAL; 7	MAR; 14	ATL; 10	TEX; 9	PHO; 4	HOM; 2			19th	2787
2009	Brian Scott	16	Toyota	DAY; 12	CAL; 29	ATL; 10	MAR; 8	KAN; 3	CLT; 21	DOV; 1	TEX; 15	MCH; 34	MLW; 3	MEM; 2	KEN; 6	IRP; 12	NSH; 2	BRI; 5	CHI; 28	IOW; 9	GTW; 3	NHA; 7	LVS; 19	MAR; 24	TAL; 23	TEX; 7	PHO; 11	HOM; 12			9th	3307

==== Secondary Truck results ====
Year	Driver	No.	Make	1	2	3	4	5	6	7	8	9	10	11	12	13	14	15	16	17	18	19	20	21	22	23	24	25	Owners	Pts
2002	Ron Hornaday Jr.	11	Chevy	DAY	DAR	MAR	GTY	PPR	DOV	TEX	MEM	MLW	KAN	KEN	NHA	MCH	IRP	NSH	RCH	TEX	SBO	LVS	CAL	PHO	HOM; 1				59th	180
2003	Jack Sprague	11	Chevy	DAY	DAR	MMR	MAR	CLT	DOV	TEX	MEM	MLW	KAN	KEN	GTW	MCH	IRP	NSH	BRI	RCH	NHA	CAL	LVS; 5					HOM; 5	49th	422
2003	Clay Brown	11	Chevy																					SBO; 17	TEX	MAR	PHO		49th	422
2005	Regan Smith	19	Chevy	DAY; 33	CAL; 32	ATL; DNQ	MAR	GTY	MFD	CLT	DOV	TEX	MCH	MLW	KAN	KEN	MEM	IRP	NSH	BRI	RCH	NHA	LVS	MAR	ATL	TEX	PHO	HOM	49th	188
2007	Travis Kittleson	19	Ford	DAY	CAL	ATL	MAR	KAN	CLT	MFD	DOV	TEX	MCH	MLW	MEM	KEN	IRP	NSH; 36	BRI	GTW	NHA	LVS	TAL	MAR	ATL	TEX	PHO	HOM	64th	0
