= 2000 O'Reilly 400 =

2000 O’Reilly 400
Race details
- NASCAR Craftsman Truck Series
- Date: October 13, 2000
- Location: Fort Worth, Texas
- Course: Texas Motor Speedway
- Course length: 1.5 miles (2.4 km)
- Distance: 167 laps, 250.5 mi (400 km)
- Average speed: 112.933 mph

Pole position
Driver	Bryan Reffner	Team Menard

Most laps led
Driver	Jack Sprague	Hendrick Motorsports
- Laps: 55

Winner
No. 3	Bryan Reffner	Team Menard

Television in the United States
- Network: ESPN
- Announcers: Marty Reid (lead broadcaster); Amy East, Dave Burns (pit reporters)

The 2000 O'Reilly 400 was a NASCAR Craftsman Truck Series event held at the Texas Motor Speedway in Fort Worth, Texas, USA, as part or the 2000 season. It was the penultimate race of the season.

The race was won by Bryan Reffner in the #3 Johns Manville/Menards Chevrolet Silverado for Team Menard. Greg Biffle, driving the #50 Grainger Ford F-150 for Roush Racing, secured the series championship with a 25th-place finish.

The event was marred, however, by an accident on Lap 33 that led to the death of driver Tony Roper.

== Background ==
The race was run on October 13, 2000, at a distance of 400 kilometers (250.5 miles) over 167 laps.

Reffner qualified his truck on pole, joined on the front row by David Starr in the #41 Case Construction Equipment Dodge Ram for TKO Motorsports. Biffle qualified the #50 in third, while Roper qualified the #26 Mittler Brothers Engine and Tool Ford for MB Motorsports in fifteenth.

Forty-five trucks attempted to qualify. Bobby Hillis Jr., qualified for the event but later withdrew.

== Accident ==
On Lap 32, Steve Grissom in the #43 Dodge Motorsports truck for Petty Enterprises was battling for position with Rick Ware in his own #51 Line-X Chevrolet and Derrike Cope in the #86 RC Dodge for Impact Motorsports. Cope made contact with Grissom's truck, which caused him to slow down. As this was happening, Roper in the #26 was approaching at full race speed and tried to pass through a gap between Ware and Grissom. Grissom made contact with Roper, sending the #26 around. Roper made hard contact with the turn four wall head on, then was hit by Grissom on the driver's side of the #26 as Grissom's teammate, Mark Petty, was nearly collected in the wreck.

Roper's truck came to a rest in the front stretch grass, and the track safety crew had to extricate him from the vehicle. He was airlifted to Parkland Memorial Hospital in Dallas, where he died of a neck injury that stopped the blood flow to his brain.
