= K&N Engineering =

American automotive parts company

K&N Engineering, Inc.
- Type: Private
- Industry: Manufacturing
- Founded: 1969
- Founders: Ken Johnson; Norm McDonald
- Headquarters: Riverside, California
- Area served: Worldwide
- Products: Air filters; Cold air intake systems; Oil filters; Performance parts
- Website: www.knfilters.com

K&N Engineering, Inc. (also known simply as K&N) is a manufacturer of air filters, cold air intake systems, oil filters, performance parts, and other related products. K&N manufactures over 12,000 parts for various makes and models of cars, trucks, SUVs, motorcycles, ATVs, industrial applications and more. Founded in the United States in 1969, K&N is headquartered in Riverside, California, in a complex of 10 buildings comprising nearly 400,000 square feet. K&N also operates facilities in England, The Netherlands, and China.

== History ==
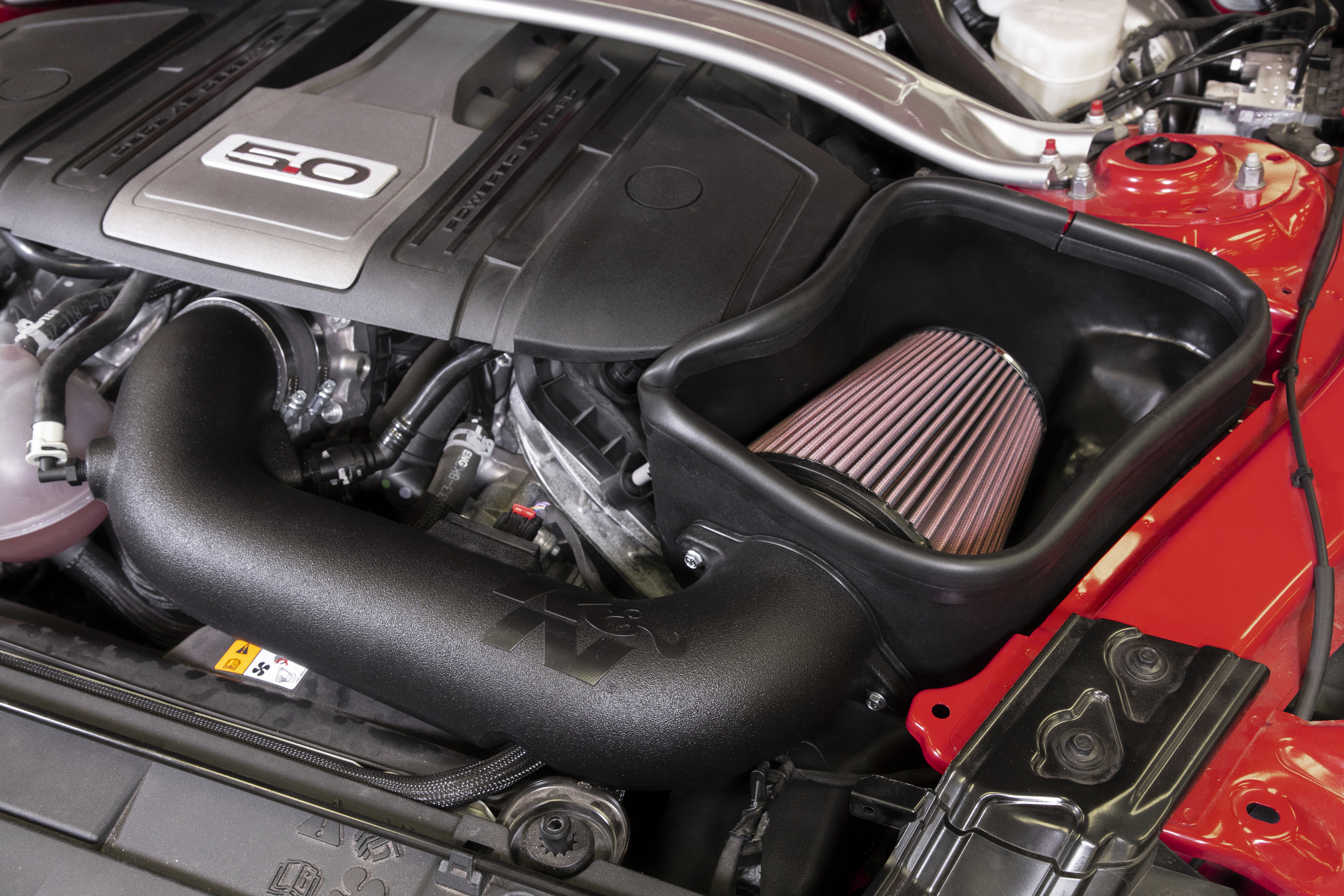
K&N cold air intake kit

K&N was founded by Ken Johnson and Norm McDonald in 1969. The name came from the first letters in the founders' first names. The company orignally sold motorcycles and motorcycle parts, and supported a K&N factory race team. Air filters soon became the primary focus of the company. In 1992, K&N introduced bolt-on cold air intake kits. K&N also released a line of oil filters with a stamped hex on the dome to accept a standard wrench for removal. In 2019, K&N released a line of washable home A/C filters, and began offering motor oil and wiper blades in 2021.

== Racing ==
K&N has maintained active involvement in racing and motorsports throughout its history, including the NASCAR Pro Series East and West, the King of the West 410 Sprint Car Series, the NHRA, and Formula Drift.

== Technology ==
K&N's claims for their air filters have been the subject of some controversy, with some third-party tests finding that K&N's oiled cotton gauze filters are less efficient and let more dirt into the engine than original-equipment paper filters, and that they become increasingly restrictive as they are coated with particulates. However, air filters in general become more airflow-restrictive as they collect contaminants, but efficiency typically increases for the majority of a filter’s service life. Other 3rd-party testing noted that a K&N oiled filter increased horsepower over its OEM counterpart.

Potential issues have been reported with oiled air filters on modern engines that use MAF sensors, which may stop working correctly when fouled by oil from an oiled-gauze air filter. However, there are several other common causes of damaged MAF sensors, including brake cleaner contamination, extremely dirty/contaminated filters, and loose battery terminals resulting in voltage spikes. K&N has published test results asserting that its oiled filters do not cause MAF sensor failures.
