= Justin Johnson (racing driver, born 1985) =

American racing driver (born 1985)

- Born: Justin A. Johnson; August 9, 1985 (age 41); Las Vegas, Nevada, U.S.
- Achievements: 2010 Irwindale Pepsi One Super Late Model champion

NASCAR FedEx Freight Truck Series career
- 5 races run over 2 years
- 2019 position: 80th
- Best finish: 42nd (2011)
- First race: 2011 Lucas Oil 150 (Phoenix)
- Last race: 2019 World of Westgate 200 (Las Vegas)
Wins	Top tens	Poles
0	1	0
- Statistics up to date as of November 25, 2019.

Justin A. Johnson (born August 9, 1985) is an American professional stock car racing driver. He has raced in the NASCAR Gander Outdoors Truck Series and NASCAR K&N Pro Series West.

== Racing career ==
A Las Vegas native, Johnson grew up competing at the Las Vegas Motor Speedway's Bullring. By 2019, he held over fifty race victories that placed him in the top five all-time among Bullring race winners; he also won championships in the Thunder Cars and USLCI Bandolero Outlaws classes.

In 2010, he won the Pepsi One Super Late Model championship at Irwindale Event Center. During the season, he made his NASCAR K&N Pro Series West debut at the track with Vision Aviation Racing, finishing 24th after being collected in a crash with Brandon Davis on lap 119. The following year, he joined VAR's NASCAR Camping World Truck Series program, which had recently merged with Billy Ballew Motorsports, racing alongside Dusty Davis. Johnson ran four races in 2011 for VAR, recording a top-ten finish at Phoenix International Raceway.

Eight years after his last start in the series, Johnson returned to the Truck Series in 2019 for the World of Westgate 200 at Las Vegas. He failed to qualify in the No. 08 for Kart Idaho Racing, but was able to participate in the race after Reaume Brothers Racing's Jesse Iwuji crashed in qualifying; although Iwuji's No. 34 team was guaranteed a spot in the race on owners' points, RBR did not have a backup truck available. Johnson provided his No. 08 truck, which was renumbered to No. 34 for the race. After starting last, he finished 23rd.

== Personal life ==
In addition to racing competitively, Johnson works for the Ron Fellows Performance Driving School in Pahrump, Nevada.

== Motorsports career results ==
=== NASCAR ===
(key) (Bold – Pole position awarded by qualifying time. Italics – Pole position earned by points standings or practice time. * – Most laps led.)

==== Gander Outdoors Truck Series ====
NASCAR Gander Outdoors Truck Series results
Year	Team	No.	Make	1	2	3	4	5	6	7	8	9	10	11	12	13	14	15	16	17	18	19	20	21	22	23	24	25	NGOTC	Pts	Ref
2011	Vision Aviation Racing	51	Toyota	DAY	PHO; 8	DAR; 35	MAR; 31	NSH; 15	DOV	CLT	KAN	TEX	KEN	IOW	NSH	IRP	POC	MCH	BRI	ATL	CHI	NHA	KEN	LVS	TAL	MAR	TEX	HOM	42nd	88	
2019	Kart Idaho Racing	08	Toyota	DAY	ATL	LVS	MAR	TEX	DOV	KAN	CLT	TEX	IOW	GTW	CHI	KEN	POC	ELD	MCH	BRI	MSP	LVS; DNQ	TAL	MAR	PHO	HOM			80th	14	
2019	Reaume Brothers Racing	34	Toyota																			LVS; 23							80th	14	

=== ARCA Menards Series West ===
(key) (Bold – Pole position awarded by qualifying time. Italics – Pole position earned by points standings or practice time. * – Most laps led. ** – All laps led.)

ARCA Menards Series West results
Year	Team	No.	Make	1	2	3	4	5	6	7	8	9	10	11	12	AMSWC	Pts	Ref
2010	Vision Aviation Racing	97	Chevy	AAS	PHO	IOW	DCS	SON	IRW; 24	PIR	MRP	CNS	MMP	AAS	PHO; 22	51st	188	
2023	Lowden Jackson Motorsports	46	Ford	PHO	IRW	KCR	PIR	SON	IRW	SHA	EVG	AAS	LVS	MAD	PHO; 12	50th	32	

^{*} Season still in progress
^{1} Ineligible for series points
