= Blake Feese =

American racing driver (born 1982)

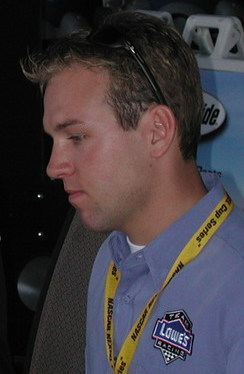
- Feese in 2005
- Born: February 8, 1982 (age 44) Saybrook, Illinois, U.S.

ARCA Re/Max Series career
- Debut season: 2003
- Former teams: FitzBradshaw Racing, Hendrick Motorsports, Sadler Brothers Racing, Baker Curb Racing
- Starts: 10
- Wins: 2
- Poles: 0
- Best finish: 30th in 2004
- Finished last season: 163rd (2008)

Previous series
- 2003: X-1R Pro Cup Series

NASCAR O'Reilly Auto Parts Series career
- 13 races run over 3 years
- Best finish: 62nd (2004)
- First race: 2004 Meijer 300 Presented by Oreo (Kentucky)
- Last race: 2005 Kroger 200 (IRP)
Wins	Top tens	Poles
0	0	0

NASCAR FedEx Freight Truck Series career
- 12 races run over 3 years
- Best finish: 74th (2005)
- First race: 2005 Built Ford Tough 225 Presented by Greater Cincinnati Ford Dealers (Kentucky)
- Last race: 2011 Ford 200 (Homestead)
Wins	Top tens	Poles
0	1	0
- Statistics up to date as of April 30, 2026.
- Statistics up to date as of June 13, 2020.

Blake Feese (born February 8, 1982) is an American second-generation auto racing driver. He competed in USAC before joining Hendrick Motorsports in 2004 and 2005 as a development driver, racing in ARCA and the NASCAR Busch Series for the team. After being released from that deal, he drove in those two series as well as the NASCAR Truck Series part-time with a number of other teams through 2011.

== Racing career ==
=== Early career ===
Feese began racing at the age of ten in quarter midgets, where he won his first two starts, moving up to Mini-sprints two years later. He won the 600cc track championship at Jacksonville Raceway in the mini-sprint division in 1998, before moving up to main Sprint Cars, where he won once, and was named Rookie of the Year.

In 2000, Feese drove in the International Racing Association, winning three races. In 2001, he competed in his first World of Outlaws race at Bristol Motor Speedway, finishing ninth. Later, he won a WoO sanctioned event at Knoxville Raceway, then won again at the All-Star sprint at Eldora Speedway the following season.

=== NASCAR ===
Late in the season, Feese met NASCAR winner Jimmy Spencer, who would help Feese get a NASCAR driving contract.

After going through 2003 without a major ride, Feese met Rick Hendrick and signed to drive two races for him that season in the ARCA series. In his second start at Nashville Superspeedway, Feese qualified 3rd and won the race. After posting two more top-tens that season, he won his second career ARCA race at Talladega Superspeedway. He made his Busch Series debut at Kentucky Speedway in the No. 87 ditech Chevrolet Monte Carlo for NEMCO Motorsports, starting sixteenth but finishing 41st after an early crash. After running two more races for NEMCO, he finished the year running the No. 00 Chevy for Haas CNC Racing, posting his best finish of the year, a 25th at the Aaron's 312.

In 2005 during the first ARCA Series race of the season at Daytona, Feese was involved in a scary accident on pit road where came into his pit stall too fast and overshot his pit stall and went through the hole in the pit wall hitting four photographers before coming to a stop. Fortunately, no one was seriously hurt but Feese had to retire with radiator damage. Feese moved up to the Busch Series that same season to share the No. 5 Lowe's Chevy with fellow Hendrick development drivers Boston Reid and Kyle Krisiloff. Feese struggled during the season however, his best finish being a 23rd at Atlanta out of six starts. He also made his Craftsman Truck Series debut at Kentucky for Billy Ballew Motorsports, starting 30th and finishing 15th.

At the end of 2005, Feese was released from his contract at Hendrick, and went back to racing sprint cars in Indiana during his time without a ride, of which he would not find one until 2007, where he ran a limited ARCA and Busch Series schedule with Sadler Brothers Racing. He also attempted to qualify for the ARCA season-opener at Daytona for Baker Curb Racing using Norm Benning Racing's owner points, but failed to qualify. Feese did not run any NASCAR or ARCA races until August 2009, where he competed in the Truck Series race at Nashville in the No. 15 Toyota Tundra for Billy Ballew Motorsports, starting 18th and finishing 12th.

In 2011, Feese would join Turner Motorsports, competing in most of the second half of the Truck Series season in their No. 32 truck, replacing Brad Sweet, who only ran the first eight races of the season in the truck.

Feese was replaced by Miguel Paludo, who moved over from the No. 7 Red Horse Racing truck, in the Turner No. 32 for 2012, which left him without a ride. He ended up not finding a ride for that year or any year after that.

== Motorsports career results ==
=== NASCAR ===
(key) (Bold – Pole position awarded by qualifying time. Italics – Pole position earned by points standings or practice time. * – Most laps led.)

==== Busch Series ====
NASCAR Busch Series results
Year	Team	No.	Make	1	2	3	4	5	6	7	8	9	10	11	12	13	14	15	16	17	18	19	20	21	22	23	24	25	26	27	28	29	30	31	32	33	34	35	NBSC	Pts	Ref
2004	NEMCO Motorsports	87	Chevy	DAY	CAR	LVS	DAR	BRI	TEX	NSH	TAL	CAL	GTY	RCH	NZH	CLT	DOV	NSH	KEN; 41	MLW	DAY	CHI	NHA	PPR	IRP; 33	MCH	BRI	CAL	RCH	DOV; 34									62nd	469	
2004	Haas CNC Racing	00	Chevy																												KAN; 24	CLT; 27	MEM; 40	ATL; 25	PHO	DAR	HOM		62nd	469	
2005	Hendrick Motorsports	5	Chevy	DAY	CAL	MXC	LVS	ATL; 23	NSH	BRI; 28	TEX; 37	PHO	TAL	DAR	RCH	CLT	DOV	NSH	KEN; 34	MLW	DAY	CHI	NHA	PPR; 37	GTY	IRP; 29	GLN	MCH	BRI	CAL	RCH	DOV	KAN	CLT	MEM	TEX	PHO	HOM	73rd	414	
2007	Sadler Brothers Racing	95	Dodge	DAY	CAL	MXC	LVS	ATL	BRI	NSH	TEX	PHO	TAL	RCH	DAR	CLT; DNQ	DOV	NSH	KEN	MLW	NHA	DAY	CHI	GTY	IRP	CGV	GLN	MCH	BRI	CAL	RCH	DOV	KAN	CLT	MEM	TEX	PHO	HOM	N/A	0	

==== Camping World Truck Series ====
NASCAR Camping World Truck Series results
Year	Team	No.	Make	1	2	3	4	5	6	7	8	9	10	11	12	13	14	15	16	17	18	19	20	21	22	23	24	25	NCWTC	Pts	Ref
2005	Billy Ballew Motorsports	15	Chevy	DAY	CAL	ATL	MAR	GTY	MFD	CLT	DOV	TEX	MCH	MLW	KAN; 15	KEN	MEM	IRP	NSH	BRI	RCH	NHA	LVS	MAR	ATL	TEX	PHO	HOM	74th	118	
2009	Billy Ballew Motorsports	15	Toyota	DAY	CAL	ATL	MAR	KAN	CLT	DOV	TEX	MCH	MLW	MEM	KEN	IRP	NSH; 12	BRI	CHI	IOW	GTW	NHA	LVS	MAR	TAL	TEX	PHO	HOM	79th	127	
2011	Turner Motorsports	32	Chevy	DAY	PHO	DAR	MAR	NSH	DOV	CLT	KAN	TEX	KEN	IOW	NSH; 18	IRP	POC	MCH	BRI; 18	ATL; 4	CHI	NHA; 21	KEN; 12	LVS; 13	TAL; 19	MAR; 32	TEX; 27	HOM; 23	24th	253	

=== ARCA Re/Max Series ===
(key) (Bold – Pole position awarded by qualifying time. Italics – Pole position earned by points standings or practice time. * – Most laps led.)

ARCA Re/Max Series results
Year	Team	No.	Make	1	2	3	4	5	6	7	8	9	10	11	12	13	14	15	16	17	18	19	20	21	22	23	ARMC	Pts	Ref
2003	FitzBradshaw Racing	14	Dodge	DAY	ATL	NSH	SLM	TOL	KEN	CLT	BLN	KAN	MCH	LER	POC	POC	NSH	ISF	WIN	DSF	CHI	SLM	TAL	CLT	SBO; 11		126th	175	
2004	Hendrick Motorsports	5	Chevy	DAY	NSH; 1	SLM	KEN; 8	TOL	CLT; 7	KAN	POC	MCH	SBO	BLN	KEN	GTW	POC	LER	NSH	ISF	TOL	DSF	CHI	SLM			30th	885	
2004	Hendrick Motorsports	94	Chevy																						TAL; 1*		30th	885	
2005	Hendrick Motorsports	94	Chevy	DAY; 36	NSH	SLM	KEN	TOL	LAN	MIL	POC	MCH	KAN	KEN	BLN	POC	GTW	LER	NSH	MCH	ISF	TOL	DSF	CHI	SLM	TAL	163rd	60	
2007	Sadler Brothers Racing	95	Dodge	DAY	USA	NSH; DNQ	SLM	KAN; 3	WIN	KEN	TOL	IOW	POC	MCH	BLN	KEN; 6	POC	NSH; 9	ISF	MIL	GTW	DSF					41st	815	
2007	Sadler Brothers Racing	8	Dodge																				CHI; 9	SLM	TAL	TOL	41st	815	
2008	Baker Curb Racing	8	Ford	DAY; DNQ	SLM	IOW	KAN	CAR	KEN	TOL	POC	MCH	CAY	KEN	BLN	POC	NSH	ISF	DSF	CHI	SLM	NJE	TAL	TOL			N/A	0	
