= Dusty Davis =

American racing driver (born 1992)

- Born: June 27, 1992 (age 34); Las Vegas, Nevada, U.S.

NASCAR O'Reilly Auto Parts Series career
- 1 race run over 1 year
- 2012 position: N/A
- First race: 2012 U.S. Cellular 250 (Iowa)
Wins	Top tens	Poles
0	0	0

NASCAR FedEx Freight Truck Series career
- 8 races run over 3 years
- 2013 position: 63rd
- Best finish: 41st (2011)
- First race: 2011 Lucas Oil 150 (Phoenix)
- Last race: 2013 NextEra Energy Resources 250 (Daytona)
Wins	Top tens	Poles
0	0	0

Dustin Davis (born June 27, 1992) is an American professional stock car racing driver. He last competed part-time in the NASCAR Camping World Truck Series, driving the No. 1 for Rick Ware Racing.

== Motorsports career results ==
=== NASCAR ===
(key) (Bold – Pole position awarded by qualifying time. Italics – Pole position earned by points standings or practice time. * – Most laps led.)

==== Nationwide Series ====
NASCAR Nationwide Series results
Year	Team	No.	Make	1	2	3	4	5	6	7	8	9	10	11	12	13	14	15	16	17	18	19	20	21	22	23	24	25	26	27	28	29	30	31	32	33	NNSC	Pts	Ref
2012	Rick Ware Racing	15	Chevy	DAY	PHO	LVS	BRI	CAL	TEX	RCH	TAL	DAR	IOW	CLT	DOV	MCH	ROA	KEN	DAY	NHA	CHI	IND	IOW; 40	GLN	CGV	BRI	ATL	RCH	CHI	KEN	DOV	CLT	KAN	TEX	PHO	HOM	N/A	0^{1}	

^{*} Season still in progress
^{1} Ineligible for series points

==== Camping World Truck Series ====
NASCAR Camping World Truck Series results
Year	Team	No.	Make	1	2	3	4	5	6	7	8	9	10	11	12	13	14	15	16	17	18	19	20	21	22	23	24	25	NCWTC	Pts	Ref
2011	Vision Aviation Racing	15	Toyota	DAY	PHO; 26	DAR; 21	MAR; 25	NSH	DOV	CLT	KAN	TEX	KEN	IOW	NSH	IRP	POC	MCH	BRI	ATL	CHI	NHA	KEN	LVS	TAL	MAR	TEX		41st	89	
2011	Billy Ballew Motorsports	15	Toyota																									HOM; 15	41st	89	
2012	Arrington Racing	15	Ram	DAY; 13																									48th	52	
2012	Arrington Racing	15	Toyota		MAR; 33	CAR	KAN	CLT	DOV	TEX	KEN	IOW	CHI	POC	MCH	BRI	ATL	IOW	KEN	LVS	TAL	MAR	TEX	PHO					48th	52	
2012	BRG Motorsports	20	Toyota																						HOM; 34				48th	52	
2013	Rick Ware Racing	1	Chevy	DAY; 20	MAR	CAR	KAN	CLT	DOV	TEX	KEN	IOW	ELD	POC	MCH	BRI	MSP	IOW	CHI	LVS	TAL	MAR	TEX	PHO	HOM				63rd	24	

==== K&N Pro Series West ====
NASCAR K&N Pro Series West results
Year	Team	No.	Make	1	2	3	4	5	6	7	8	9	10	11	12	NKNPSWC	Pts	Ref
2010	Vision Aviation Racing	94	Chevy	AAS	PHO	IOW	DCS	SON	IRW; 8	PIR	MRP	CNS	MMP	AAS	PHO; 5	35th	297	
