= NASCAR Truck Series at Daytona International Speedway =

NASCAR Craftsman Truck Series races at Daytona

NASCAR Truck Series
- Venue: Daytona International Speedway
- Location: Daytona Beach, Florida, United States

Circuit information
- Surface: Asphalt
- Length: 2.5 mi (4.0 km)
- Turns: 4

Pickup truck racing events in the NASCAR Truck Series have been held at Daytona International Speedway, in Daytona Beach, Florida during numerous seasons and times of year since 2000.

== Current race ==
Fresh From Florida 250
- Corporate sponsor: Florida Department of Agriculture and Consumer Services
- First race: 2000
- Distance: 250 miles (400 km)
- Laps: 100; Stages 1/2: 20 each Final stage: 60
- Previous names: Daytona 250 (2000); Florida Dodge Dealers 250 (2001–2005); GM Flex Fuel 250 (2006); Chevy Silverado HD 250 (2007–2008); NextEra Energy Resources 250 (2009–2018); NextEra Energy 250 (2019–2023)
- Most wins (driver): Johnny Sauter (3)
- Most wins (team): GMS Racing, Bobby Hamilton Racing, ThorSport Racing & Front Row Motorsports (3)
- Most wins (manufacturer): Toyota (11)

The Fresh From Florida 250 is the first race of the NASCAR Truck Series held annually at Daytona International Speedway. It is the Truck Series event of Speedweek – the series of races leading up to the Daytona 500.

Chandler Smith is the defending winner of the event, having won it in 2026.

=== History ===
The inaugural running of the race in 2000 featured one of the most horrific wrecks in NASCAR history. Just past the halfway point of the race, Kurt Busch's truck made contact with that of Rob Morgan, turning him into Geoff Bodine's truck, sending Bodine careening airborne into the wall and catch fence just past the start-finish line. Bodine's truck burst into flames and flipped at least 10 times before coming to a stop toward Turn 1, causing a major wreck involving 13 trucks. Despite having serious injuries, Bodine survived and raced again later that year in May at Richmond. Although this race was largely overshadowed by this wreck, it was truly exciting as Mike Wallace made the last-lap pass on Andy Houston for the inaugural victory.

The 2003 race featured a three-wide finish on the final lap between Rick Crawford, defending Daytona winner Robert Pressley, and that year's eventual champion Travis Kvapil, where the margin of victory was 0.027 seconds.

In early 2004, it was announced that the race would move from Friday afternoon to Friday night and be run under the lights. Carl Edwards would go on to win the race, and Travis Kvapil finished second. The race was Toyota's first truck race.

Kerry Earnhardt started from the pole in the 2005 race, but finished 35th due to an accident. Bobby Hamilton won from the 36th starting position, the farthest starting position for a driver to win. The race was marred by a late caution resulting in confusion: Jimmy Spencer had held off Hamilton on the final lap before a caution was called just before both reached the finish line. Spencer, thinking he was the winner, celebrated in Victory Lane before NASCAR officials reviewed the finish and determined Hamilton was the leader at the time the caution was called and, thus, the winner.

In 2007, another three-wide finish between Travis Kvapil, Johnny Benson Jr., and Jack Sprague, who won the race; the margin of victory was 0.031 seconds (second-closest finish). Sprague was the third driver to win from the pole.

The 2009 race was the first under the new series title sponsorship of Camping World and for race title sponsor NextEra Energy Resources. Todd Bodine won, becoming the first driver to win back-to-back season-opening truck races at the Daytona International Speedway; Kyle Busch finished second in both races. Also, Todd Bodine won the 2009 race without a sponsor. Six days after the race, fifth-place finisher Ron Hornaday Jr. was docked 25 points, and owner DeLana Harvick was docked 25 owner points as a penalty for illegal shocks used in the race. Crew chief Rick Ren was placed on probation and fined $5,000 because of the violations.

In the 2011 race, Michael Waltrip pulled off a slingshot last-lap pass on Elliott Sadler to win his first career Truck race in a No. 15 truck. The victory made Waltrip the 22nd driver to win in all of NASCAR's top three divisions. Although his truck failed post-race inspection because the right side of the spoiler had snapped, resulting in a penalty for his team, he kept the win as he was not running for Truck points.

In 2017, 18-year-old Kaz Grala scored his maiden Truck Series victory, becoming the youngest race winner in Daytona history. Matt Crafton had been leading the race on the final lap before he was turned by a spinning Ben Rhodes and sent into a flip.

In 2019, only nine drivers finished the race, with many being involved in wrecks. Austin Hill survived the carnage to win his first career Truck race.

In 2020, Grant Enfinger won for the first time since Las Vegas in September 2018. Enfinger won in a three-wide photo finish in which he beat Jordan Anderson by 0.010 of a second with Codie Rohrbaugh in tow; the margin of victory made it the closest finish in the event's history. Natalie Decker broke Jennifer Jo Cobb's record as the highest finishing woman in a Truck Series event by finishing fifth; Cobb's best finish was sixth in the 2011 event. On lap 16, rookie Ty Majeski flipped onto his roof, sliding on it for several hundred feet on the banking before landing on the apron.

The 2023 event marked the first time that the event failed to reach the 250-mile/100-lap distance. On-and-off showers plagued the event on five different occasions with three red flags. After an hour-long rain delay with 74 laps completed, drivers got back to their trucks only for it to start raining again, causing them to return to pit road. With 79 laps completed, NASCAR called the race over, with Zane Smith becoming just the second driver to win the event back-to-back (Todd Bodine was the first in 2008-2009). Of the 79 laps, only 38 were under green.

In 2024, Fresh From Florida (an initiative/campaign of the Florida Department of Agriculture and Consumer Services) became the title sponsor of the race, replacing NextEra Energy Resources, which had been the title sponsor of the race since 2009. This ended NextEra's long 15 year run as the title sponsor of the race.

=== Past winners ===
Year	Date	No.	Driver	Team	Manufacturer	Race distance		Race time	Average speed (mph)	Report	Ref
Year	Date	No.	Driver	Team	Manufacturer	Laps	Miles (km)	Race time	Average speed (mph)	Report	Ref
2000	February 18	2	Mike Wallace	Ultra Motorsports	Ford	100	250 (402.336)	1:55:00	130.152	Report	
2001	February 16	18	Joe Ruttman	Bobby Hamilton Racing	Dodge	104*	260 (418.429)	2:00:33	129.407	Report	
2002	February 15	18	Robert Pressley	Bobby Hamilton Racing	Dodge	100	250 (402.336)	1:47:03	140.121	Report	
2003	February 14	14	Rick Crawford	Circle Bar Racing	Ford	106*	265 (426.476)	2:04:34	127.642	Report	
2004	February 13	99	Carl Edwards	Roush Racing	Ford	100	250 (402.336)	2:13:15	112.57	Report	
2005	February 18	04	Bobby Hamilton	Bobby Hamilton Racing	Dodge	100	250 (402.336)	2:00:04	124.931	Report	
2006	February 17	6	Mark Martin	Roush Racing	Ford	102*	255 (410.382)	1:44:21*	146.622*	Report	
2007	February 16	60	Jack Sprague	Wyler Racing	Toyota	100	250 (402.336)	2:07:24	117.739	Report	
2008	February 15	30	Todd Bodine	Germain Racing	Toyota	100	250 (402.336)	1:57:36	127.551	Report	
2009	February 13	30	Todd Bodine	Germain Racing	Toyota	100	250 (402.336)	2:02:11	122.766	Report	
2010	February 13*	17	Timothy Peters	Red Horse Racing	Toyota	100	250 (402.336)	2:10:06	115.295	Report	
2011	February 18	15	Michael Waltrip	Billy Ballew Motorsports	Toyota	103*	257.5 (414.406)	1:58:33	130.025	Report	
2012	February 24	7	John King	Red Horse Racing	Toyota	109*	272.5 (438.546)	2:17:13	119.169	Report	
2013	February 22	98	Johnny Sauter	ThorSport Racing	Toyota	100	250 (402.336)	1:45:56	141.598	Report	
2014	February 21	51	Kyle Busch	Kyle Busch Motorsports	Toyota	100	250 (402.336)	1:45:10	142.631	Report	
2015	February 20	19	Tyler Reddick	Brad Keselowski Racing	Ford	100	250 (402.336)	1:56:45	128.48	Report	
2016	February 19	21	Johnny Sauter	GMS Racing	Chevrolet	100	250 (402.336)	1:56:15	129.032	Report	
2017	February 24	33	Kaz Grala	GMS Racing	Chevrolet	100	250 (402.336)	1:55:38	129.72	Report	
2018	February 16	21	Johnny Sauter	GMS Racing	Chevrolet	100	250 (402.336)	2:04:36	120.385	Report	
2019	February 15	16	Austin Hill	Hattori Racing Enterprises	Toyota	111*	277.5 (446.593)	2:39:20	104.498	Report	
2020	February 14	98	Grant Enfinger	ThorSport Racing	Ford	106*	265 (426.476)	2:04:53	127.319	Report	
2021	February 12	99	Ben Rhodes	ThorSport Racing	Toyota	101*	252.5 (406.359)	2:20:33	107.791	Report	
2022	February 18	38	Zane Smith	Front Row Motorsports	Ford	106*	265 (426.476)	2:03:07	129.146	Report	
2023	February 17	38	Zane Smith	Front Row Motorsports	Ford	79*	197.5 (317.845)	2:09:23	115.935	Report	
2024	February 16	2	Nick Sanchez	Rev Racing	Chevrolet	101*	252.5 (406.359)	2:33:08	98.933	Report	
2025	February 14	11	Corey Heim	Tricon Garage	Toyota	100	250 (402.336)	2:09:07	116.174	Report	
2026	February 13	38	Chandler Smith	Front Row Motorsports	Ford	102*	255 (410.382)	2:06:00	121.429	Report	
2027	February 19									Report	

- 2001, 2003, 2006, 2011–12, 2019–22, 2024, 2026: The race was extended due to a NASCAR Overtime finish.
- 2010: Race postponed from Friday to Saturday due to rain.
- 2023: Race shortened due to rain.
- 2025: Corey Heim scored as winner after Parker Kligerman was disqualified in post-race inspection.

==== Multiple winners (drivers) ====
# of wins	Driver	Years won
3	Johnny Sauter	2013, 2016, 2018
2	Todd Bodine	2008-2009
2	Zane Smith	2022-2023

==== Multiple winners (teams) ====
# of wins	Team	Years won
3	GMS Racing	2016-2018
3	Bobby Hamilton Racing	2001, 2002, 2005
3	ThorSport Racing	2013, 2020-2021
3	Front Row Motorsports	2022-2023, 2026
2	Roush Racing	2004, 2006
2	Germain Racing	2008-2009
2	Red Horse Racing	2010, 2012

==== Manufacturer wins ====
# of wins	Make	Years won
11	(Japan) Toyota	2007-2014, 2019, 2021, 2025
9	(United States) Ford	2000, 2003-2004, 2006, 2015, 2020, 2022-2023, 2026
4	(United States) Chevrolet	2016-2018, 2024
3	(United States) Dodge	2001-2002, 2005

== Former road course race ==
BrakeBest Select 159
- Corporate sponsor: O'Reilly Auto Parts
- First race: 2020
- Last race: 2021
- Distance: 166.06 miles (267.25 km)
- Laps: 44; Stage 1: 12; Stage 2: 13; Final stage: 19
- Previous names: Sunoco 159 (2020)
- Most wins (driver): Sheldon Creed; Ben Rhodes (1)
- Most wins (team): GMS Racing; ThorSport Racing (1)
- Most wins (manufacturer): Chevrolet; Toyota (1)

The BrakeBest Select 159 presented by O'Reilly was a NASCAR Camping World Truck Series race held at the Daytona International Speedway infield road course in Daytona Beach, Florida. Originally created in 2020 as a temporary event in response to races canceled by the COVID-19 pandemic, the race returned in 2021 for the same reason. The race didn’t return to the schedule in 2022.

Ben Rhodes was the final race winner of the race, having won it in 2021.

=== History ===
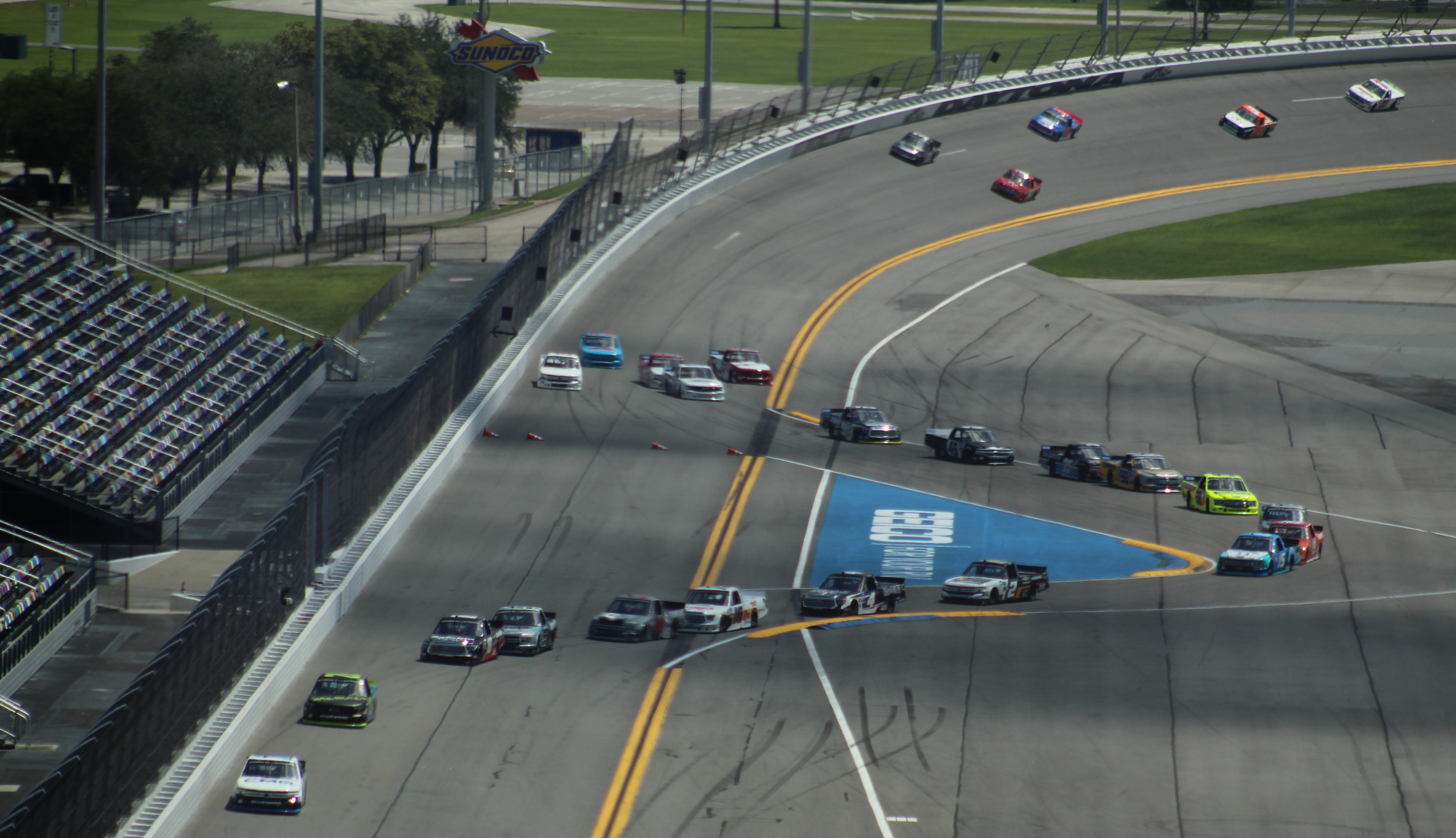
Trucks going through the frontstretch chicane in the 2020 race

The Daytona infield road course, which includes parts of the 2.5 mi (4.0 km) speedway oval, is most notably used for the 24 Hours of Daytona sports car race and Daytona 200 motorcycle race. In March 2020, NASCAR announced the NASCAR Cup Series' Busch Clash exhibition race would use the road course rather than the oval starting in 2021.

Prior to schedule changes in response to the COVID-19 pandemic, the Chevrolet Silverado 250 at Canadian Tire Motorsport Park served as the Truck Series' lone road course race; due to the pandemic, it was canceled in July. A new race on the Daytona road course was organized, which officially replaced the also-canceled event at Iowa Speedway. Known as the Sunoco 159, it was the first leg of the Triple Truck Challenge that provided monetary rewards for the winner. Although much of the road course layout remained the same as the sports car configuration, NASCAR added a frontstretch chicane exiting the oval's turn four to allow trucks to slow down entering the braking-heavy turn one. Sheldon Creed, driving a Chevrolet, won the inaugural event in 2020, his second victory of the season to that point.

While the event was intended to be just a temporary race for 2020, it returned in 2021 after the Cup and Xfinity Series races at Auto Club Speedway were canceled due to concerns related to COVID-19. Although the Trucks did not have an Auto Club race, their round at Homestead–Miami Speedway was replaced for logistics reasons as the Homestead weekend was moved back one week in order to keep the teams in Daytona a second consecutive week. The race became one of four Truck road course events, the most in series history. O'Reilly Auto Parts became the title sponsor for the weekend's races, which renamed the Truck event to the BrakeBest Select 159. Ben Rhodes won after holding off Creed on three overtime starts; the race began under "wet" conditions due to rain before the start, which allowed teams to strategize when to switch from rain tires to dry-weather racing slicks.

The race was not renewed for 2022.

=== Past winners ===
Year	Date	No.	Driver	Team	Manufacturer	Race Distance		Race Time	Average Speed (mph)	Report	Ref
Year	Date	No.	Driver	Team	Manufacturer	Laps	Miles (km)	Race Time	Average Speed (mph)	Report	Ref
2020	August 16	2	Sheldon Creed	GMS Racing	Chevrolet	46*	166.06 (267.47)	2:02:21	81.435	Report	
2021	February 19	99	Ben Rhodes	ThorSport Racing	Toyota	51*	184.11 (296.542)	2:44:46	67.044	Report	

- 2020 & 2021: Race extended due to NASCAR overtime.

Previous race: Craftsman 200 (the previous season)	NASCAR Craftsman Truck Series; Fresh From Florida 250	Next race: Fr8 208
