= 2019 World of Westgate 200 =

Race details
- Race 19 of 23 in the 2019 NASCAR Gander Outdoors Truck Series season
- Date: September 13, 2019
- Location: Las Vegas Motor Speedway in Las Vegas
- Course: Permanent racing facility
- Course length: 1.5 miles (2.4 km)
- Distance: 134 laps, 201 mi (323 km)

Pole position
Driver	Christian Eckes	Kyle Busch Motorsports
- Time: 30.324

Most laps led
Driver	Ross Chastain	Niece Motorsports
- Laps: 88

Winner
No. 16	Austin Hill	Hattori Racing Enterprises

Television in the United States
- Network: FS1

Radio in the United States
- Radio: MRN

The 2019 World of Westgate 200 is a NASCAR Gander Outdoors Truck Series race held on September 13, 2019, at Las Vegas Motor Speedway in Las Vegas, Nevada. Contested over 134 laps on the 1.5 mi (2.4 km) asphalt intermediate speedway, it was the 19th race of the 2019 NASCAR Gander Outdoors Truck Series season, third race of the Playoffs, and final race of the Round of 8.

== Background ==
=== Track ===
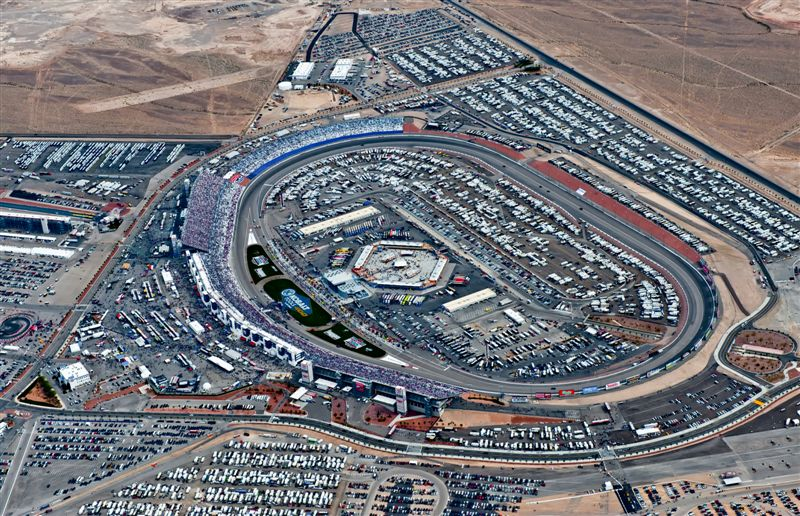
Las Vegas Motor Speedway, the track where the race is held.

Las Vegas Motor Speedway, located in Clark County, Nevada outside the Las Vegas city limits and about 15 miles northeast of the Las Vegas Strip, is a 1,200-acre (490 ha) complex of multiple tracks for motorsports racing. The complex is owned by Speedway Motorsports, Inc., which is headquartered in Charlotte, North Carolina.

== Entry list ==
No.	Driver	Team	Manufacturer
02	Tyler Dippel (R)	Young's Motorsports	Chevrolet
2	Sheldon Creed (R)	GMS Racing	Chevrolet
3	Jordan Anderson	Jordan Anderson Racing	Chevrolet
04	Cory Roper	Roper Racing	Ford
4	Todd Gilliland	Kyle Busch Motorsports	Toyota
5	Dylan Lupton	DGR-Crosley	Toyota
08	Justin Johnson	Kart Idaho Racing	Toyota
8	John Hunter Nemechek (i)	NEMCO Motorsports	Chevrolet
9	Codie Rohrbaugh	CR7 Motorsports	Chevrolet
10	Jennifer Jo Cobb	Jennifer Jo Cobb Racing	Chevrolet
11	Spencer Davis	Rette Jones Racing	Toyota
12	Gus Dean (R)	Young's Motorsports	Chevrolet
13	Johnny Sauter	ThorSport Racing	Ford
15	Anthony Alfredo (R)	DGR-Crosley	Toyota
16	Austin Hill	Hattori Racing Enterprises	Toyota
17	Tyler Ankrum (R)	DGR-Crosley	Toyota
18	Harrison Burton (R)	Kyle Busch Motorsports	Toyota
19	Derek Kraus	Bill McAnally Racing	Toyota
20	Spencer Boyd	Young's Motorsports	Chevrolet
22	Austin Wayne Self	AM Racing	Chevrolet
24	Brett Moffitt	GMS Racing	Chevrolet
30	Brennan Poole (R)	On Point Motorsports	Toyota
33	Mason Massey	Reaume Brothers Racing	Chevrolet
34	Jesse Iwuji	Reaume Brothers Racing	Chevrolet
38	Colin Garrett (i)	Niece Motorsports	Chevrolet
44	Angela Ruch	Niece Motorsports	Chevrolet
45	Ross Chastain	Niece Motorsports	Chevrolet
51	Christian Eckes	Kyle Busch Motorsports	Toyota
52	Stewart Friesen	Halmar Friesen Racing	Chevrolet
54	Natalie Decker (R)	DGR-Crosley	Toyota
56	Tyler Hill	Hill Motorsports	Chevrolet
87	Tony Mrakovich	NEMCO Motorsports	Chevrolet
88	Matt Crafton	ThorSport Racing	Ford
98	Grant Enfinger	ThorSport Racing	Ford
99	Ben Rhodes	ThorSport Racing	Ford

== Practice ==
Stewart Friesen was the fastest in the practice session with a time of 30.061 seconds and a speed of 179.635 mph (289.095 km/h).

Pos	No.	Driver	Team	Manufacturer	Time	Speed
1	52	Stewart Friesen	Halmar Friesen Racing	Chevrolet	30.061	179.635
2	24	Brett Moffitt	GMS Racing	Chevrolet	30.072	179.569
3	98	Grant Enfinger	ThorSport Racing	Ford	30.153	179.087

== Qualifying ==
Christian Eckes scored the pole for the race with a time of 30.324 seconds and a speed of 178.077 mph (286.587 km/h).

=== Qualifying results ===
Pos	No	Driver	Team	Manufacturer	Time
1	51	Christian Eckes	Kyle Busch Motorsports	Toyota	30.324
2	45	Ross Chastain	Niece Motorsports	Chevrolet	30.335
3	4	Todd Gilliland	Kyle Busch Motorsports	Toyota	30.353
4	24	Brett Moffitt	GMS Racing	Chevrolet	30.408
5	88	Matt Crafton	ThorSport Racing	Ford	30.444
6	2	Sheldon Creed (R)	GMS Racing	Chevrolet	30.456
7	16	Austin Hill	Hattori Racing Enterprises	Toyota	30.480
8	98	Grant Enfinger	ThorSport Racing	Ford	30.487
9	18	Harrison Burton (R)	Kyle Busch Motorsports	Toyota	30.519
10	13	Johnny Sauter	ThorSport Racing	Ford	30.523
11	8	John Hunter Nemechek (i)	NEMCO Motorsports	Chevrolet	30.534
12	87	Tony Mrakovich	NEMCO Motorsports	Chevrolet	30.572
13	99	Ben Rhodes	ThorSport Racing	Ford	30.598
14	3	Jordan Anderson	Jordan Anderson Racing	Chevrolet	30.653
15	15	Anthony Alfredo (R)	DGR-Crosley	Toyota	30.681
16	17	Tyler Ankrum (R)	DGR-Crosley	Toyota	30.687
17	5	Dylan Lupton	DGR-Crosley	Toyota	30.774
18	30	Brennan Poole (R)	On Point Motorsports	Toyota	30.795
19	52	Stewart Friesen	Halmar Friesen Racing	Chevrolet	30.814
20	11	Spencer Davis	Rette Jones Racing	Toyota	30.849
21	54	Natalie Decker (R)	DGR-Crosley	Toyota	30.888
22	02	Tyler Dippel (R)	Young's Motorsports	Chevrolet	30.896
23	12	Gus Dean (R)	Young's Motorsports	Chevrolet	30.917
24	19	Derek Kraus	Bill McAnally Racing	Toyota	30.993
25	38	Colin Garrett (i)	Niece Motorsports	Chevrolet	31.019
26	22	Austin Wayne Self	AM Racing	Chevrolet	31.050
27	9	Codie Rohrbaugh	CR7 Motorsports	Chevrolet	31.091
28	33	Mason Massey	Reaume Brothers Racing	Chevrolet	31.306
29	20	Spencer Boyd	Young's Motorsports	Chevrolet	31.800
30	44	Angela Ruch	Niece Motorsports	Chevrolet	31.995
31	10	Jennifer Jo Cobb	Jennifer Jo Cobb Racing	Chevrolet	32.516
32	34	Jesse Iwuji	Reaume Brothers Racing	Chevrolet	0.000
Did not qualify
33	04	Cory Roper	Roper Racing	Ford	31.112
34	08	Justin Johnson	Kart Idaho Racing	Toyota	32.066
35	56	Tyler Hill	Hill Motorsports	Chevrolet	0.000

- Justin Johnson failed to qualify his No. 08 Kart Idaho Racing Toyota but still drove his truck renumbered with the No. 34 in the race since Jesse Iwuji crashed his No. 34 Chevrolet truck of Reaume Brothers Racing during qualifying but still made the race by Owners' points. Since Reaume Brothers Racing didn't have a backup truck, Iwuji withdrew from the race and let Johnson drive his (previously No. 08) truck in the race.

. – Playoffs driver

== Race ==
=== Summary ===
Christian Eckes started on pole. Grant Enfinger's truck began smoking due to an oil leak near the beginning of the race, ultimately ending his race and championship hopes. Stewart Friesen also had a problem as it appeared he lost a cylinder during Stage 1. Repairs to the truck put him two laps down. Ross Chastain took the lead from Eckes early on and won Stage 1.

In Stage 2, a bizarre occurrence saw Johnny Sauter and Matt Crafton's trucks begin emitting fire simultaneously while they were on the same straightaway, sending them both to the garage. Crafton retired from the race, but Sauter later returned to the track. His truck started smoking shortly afterwards, ending his day for good. Afterwards, Ben Rhodes was the only ThorSport Racing driver whose truck's engine hadn't failed. Chastain continued his lead and won Stage 2.

In the closing laps, Austin Hill stayed out while rest of the field pitted, but he pitted during the final caution for tires. Hill made up lost track position, hunting down Chastain and taking the lead with 12 laps remaining. He remained ahead of Chastain and won the race. With Enfinger's playoff hopes already gone, Tyler Ankrum (who entered the race below the cutoff line) barely topped Sauter for the sixth and final spot due to his 11th-place finish, eliminating Sauter from the playoffs.

=== Stage Results ===
Stage One Laps: 30

Pos	No	Driver	Team	Manufacturer	Points
1	45	Ross Chastain	Niece Motorsports	Chevrolet	10
2	88	Matt Crafton	ThorSport Racing	Ford	9
3	16	Austin Hill	Hattori Racing Enterprises	Toyota	8
4	13	Johnny Sauter	ThorSport Racing	Ford	7
5	4	Todd Gilliland	Kyle Busch Motorsports	Toyota	6
6	2	Sheldon Creed (R)	GMS Racing	Chevrolet	5
7	30	Brennan Poole (R)	On Point Motorsports	Toyota	4
8	18	Harrison Burton (R)	Kyle Busch Motorsports	Toyota	3
9	24	Brett Moffitt	GMS Racing	Chevrolet	2
10	17	Tyler Ankrum (R)	DGR-Crosley	Toyota	1

Stage Two Laps: 30

Pos	No	Driver	Team	Manufacturer	Points
1	45	Ross Chastain	Niece Motorsports	Chevrolet	10
2	16	Austin Hill	Hattori Racing Enterprises	Toyota	9
3	24	Brett Moffitt	GMS Racing	Chevrolet	8
4	99	Ben Rhodes	ThorSport Racing	Ford	7
5	30	Brennan Poole (R)	On Point Motorsports	Toyota	6
6	51	Christian Eckes	Kyle Busch Motorsports	Toyota	5
7	2	Sheldon Creed (R)	GMS Racing	Chevrolet	4
8	4	Todd Gilliland	Kyle Busch Motorsports	Toyota	3
9	17	Tyler Ankrum (R)	DGR-Crosley	Toyota	2
10	12	Gus Dean (R)	Young's Motorsports	Chevrolet	1

=== Final Stage Results ===
Stage Three Laps: 74

Pos	Grid	No	Driver	Team	Manufacturer	Laps	Points
1	7	16	Austin Hill	Hattori Racing Enterprises	Toyota	134	57
2	2	45	Ross Chastain	Niece Motorsports	Chevrolet	134	55
3	1	51	Christian Eckes	Kyle Busch Motorsports	Toyota	134	39
4	6	2	Sheldon Creed (R)	GMS Racing	Chevrolet	134	42
5	3	4	Todd Gilliland	Kyle Busch Motorsports	Toyota	134	41
6	18	30	Brennan Poole (R)	On Point Motorsports	Toyota	134	41
7	4	24	Brett Moffitt	GMS Racing	Chevrolet	134	40
8	13	99	Ben Rhodes	ThorSport Racing	Ford	134	36
9	9	18	Harrison Burton (R)	Kyle Busch Motorsports	Toyota	134	31
10	17	5	Dylan Lupton	DGR-Crosley	Toyota	134	27
11	16	17	Tyler Ankrum (R)	DGR-Crosley	Toyota	134	29
12	15	15	Anthony Alfredo (R)	DGR-Crosley	Toyota	134	25
13	12	87	Tony Mrakovich	NEMCO Motorsports	Chevrolet	134	24
14	14	3	Jordan Anderson	Jordan Anderson Racing	Chevrolet	134	23
15	23	12	Gus Dean (R)	Young's Motorsports	Chevrolet	133	23
16	27	9	Codie Rohrbaugh	CR7 Motorsports	Chevrolet	133	21
17	26	22	Austin Wayne Self	AM Racing	Chevrolet	133	20
18	20	11	Spencer Davis	Rette Jones Racing	Toyota	133	19
19	19	52	Stewart Friesen	Halmar Friesen Racing	Chevrolet	132	18
20	29	20	Spencer Boyd (R)	Young's Motorsports	Chevrolet	132	17
21	25	38	Colin Garrett (i)	Niece Motorsports	Chevrolet	131	0
22	30	44	Angela Ruch	Niece Motorsports	Chevrolet	131	15
23	32	34	Justin Johnson	Reaume Brothers Racing	Toyota	127	14
24	31	10	Jennifer Jo Cobb	Jennifer Jo Cobb Racing	Chevrolet	90	13
25	21	54	Natalie Decker (R)	DGR-Crosley	Toyota	87	12
26	22	02	Tyler Dippel (R)	Young's Motorsports	Chevrolet	80	11
27	24	19	Derek Kraus	Bill McAnally Racing	Toyota	77	10
28	28	33	Mason Massey	Reaume Brothers Racing	Chevrolet	63	9
29	10	13	Johnny Sauter	ThorSport Racing	Ford	45	15
30	5	88	Matt Crafton	ThorSport Racing	Ford	39	16
31	8	98	Grant Enfinger	ThorSport Racing	Ford	6	6
32	11	8	John Hunter Nemechek (i)	NEMCO Motorsports	Chevrolet	0	0

. – Driver advanced to the next round of the playoffs.

. – Driver was eliminated from the playoffs.

Previous race: 2019 Chevrolet Silverado 250	NASCAR Gander Outdoors Truck Series; 2019 season	Next race: 2019 Sugarlands Shine 250
