= NASCAR Truck Series at Homestead–Miami Speedway =

NASCAR Truck Series races at Homestead–Miami Speedway

Craftsman 200

NASCAR Truck Series
- Venue: Homestead–Miami Speedway
- Location: Homestead, Florida, United States
- Corporate sponsor: Craftsman
- First race: 1996
- Distance: 201 miles (323 km)
- Laps: 134; Stages 1/2: 30; Final stage: 74
- Previous names: Florida Dodge Dealers 400 (1996–2001); Ford 200 (2002–2011); Ford EcoBoost 200 (2012–2019); Baptist Health 200 (2020, 2022, 2024–2025); Baptist Health Cancer Care 200 (2023)
- Most wins (driver): Kyle Busch (3)
- Most wins (team): Kyle Busch Motorsports (5)
- Most wins (manufacturer): Toyota (13)

Circuit information
- Surface: Asphalt
- Length: 1.5 mi (2.4 km)
- Turns: 4

The Craftsman 200 is a NASCAR Truck Series race held at the Homestead–Miami Speedway in Homestead, Florida, since 1996.

Kaden Honeycutt is the race's defending winner.

== History ==
Beginning as a 250-mile race, the inaugural race in 1996 was won by Ford racing driver Dave Rezendes after starting the race tenth on the grid. The following year, John Nemechek was seriously injured in a crash during the race and died several days later, becoming the first of two drivers (the other being Tony Roper in 2000) to die from injuries sustained in a crash in the Truck Series.

Kenny Irwin Jr. and Rick Crawford won the second and third running of the race, while Mike Wallace won the event in 1999 after going an extra seven miles. In 2000, Chevrolet racing driver, Andy Houston won the event after qualifying third on the grid; the highest starting position for any of the winners at the time. Ted Musgrave won the final 250-mile race ahead of Travis Kvapil in 2001.

For the 2002 running of the race, the race's distance was shortened by 50 miles and was moved to November, becoming the last race in the championship season. Ron Hornaday Jr. recorded the win ahead of the defending winner Musgrave. The next five runnings of the race were won by Bobby Hamilton, Kasey Kahne, Todd Bodine, Mark Martin and Johnny Benson Jr. In 2008, Bodine became the first driver to win the event more than once. Kevin Harvick, Kyle Busch and Johnny Sauter won the next three editions of the event in 2009, 2010 and 2011.

In 2020, the race was moved from the season finale to the third round of the schedule. Although initially scheduled for Friday, March 20, the race was postponed to Saturday, June 13 due to the COVID-19 pandemic. Baptist Health assumed naming rights for the event.

The 2021 race was replaced by the BrakeBest Brake Pads 159 at the Daytona International Speedway road course, a move that followed the Cup and Xfinity Series changing from Auto Club Speedway to Daytona because of COVID-19. However, the two higher series retained their Homestead races for the 2021 season.

From 2022 to 2024, the race was held on the same day as the O'Reilly Auto Parts 300. In 2025, the race was moved to Friday night.

On May 5, 2025, it was announced that Homestead would become the championship race in 2026, replacing Phoenix. Since Craftsman owns the naming rights for the series, the race was dubbed as the Craftsman 200.

== Past winners ==
Year	Date	No.	Driver	Team	Manufacturer	Race distance		Race time	Average speed (mph)	Report	Ref
Year	Date	No.	Driver	Team	Manufacturer	Laps	Miles (km)	Race time	Average speed (mph)	Report	Ref
1996	March 17	7	Dave Rezendes	Geoff Bodine Racing	Ford	167	250.5 (403.14)	2:30:12	102	Report	
1997	March 16	98	Kenny Irwin Jr.	Liberty Racing	Ford	167	250.5 (403.14)	2:34:13	98.565	Report	
1998	April 4	14	Rick Crawford	Circle Bar Racing	Ford	167	250.5 (403.14)	2:11:17	114.475	Report	
1999	March 20	2	Mike Wallace	Ultra Motorsports	Ford	172*	258 (415.21)	2:20:58	109.813	Report	
2000	February 26	60	Andy Houston	Addington Racing	Chevrolet	167	250.5 (403.14)	1:55:50	129.755	Report	
2001	March 4	1	Ted Musgrave	Ultra Motorsports	Dodge	167	250.5 (403.14)	2:07:11	118.176	Report	
2002	November 15	11	Ron Hornaday Jr.	Xpress Motorsports	Chevrolet	134	201 (323.478)	1:30:30	133.26	Report	
2003	November 14	4	Bobby Hamilton	Bobby Hamilton Racing	Dodge	134	201 (323.478)	1:40:08	120.439	Report	
2004	November 19	2	Kasey Kahne	Ultra Motorsports	Dodge	134	201 (323.478)	1:44:56	114.93	Report	
2005	November 19*	30	Todd Bodine	Germain Racing	Toyota	134	201 (323.478)	1:40:34	119.92	Report	
2006*	November 17	6	Mark Martin	Roush Racing	Ford	134	201 (323.478)	1:35:42	126.019	Report	
2007	November 16	23	Johnny Benson Jr.	Bill Davis Racing	Toyota	138*	207 (333.134)	1:32:20	134.513	Report	
2008	November 14	30	Todd Bodine	Germain Racing	Toyota	137*	205.5 (330.72)	1:36:57	127.179	Report	
2009	November 20	4	Kevin Harvick	Kevin Harvick Inc.	Chevrolet	136*	204 (328.306)	1:32:43	132.015	Report	
2010	November 19	18	Kyle Busch	Kyle Busch Motorsports	Toyota	134	201 (323.478)	1:41:43	118.55	Report	
2011	November 18	13	Johnny Sauter	ThorSport Racing	Chevrolet	119*	178.5 (287.267)	1:25:25	125.385	Report	
2012	November 16	33	Cale Gale	Eddie Sharp Racing	Chevrolet	140*	210 (337.962)	1:43:47	121.407	Report	
2013	November 15	51	Kyle Busch	Kyle Busch Motorsports	Toyota	148*	222 (357.274)	2:01:57	109.225	Report	
2014	November 14	54	Bubba Wallace	Kyle Busch Motorsports	Toyota	134	201 (323.478)	1:45:59	113.791	Report	
2015	November 20	88	Matt Crafton	ThorSport Racing	Toyota	134	201 (323.478)	1:35:10	126.725	Report	
2016	November 18	9	William Byron	Kyle Busch Motorsports	Toyota	134	201 (323.478)	1:32:57	129.747	Report	
2017	November 17	29	Chase Briscoe	Brad Keselowski Racing	Ford	134	201 (323.478)	1:28:58	135.556	Report	
2018	November 16	16	Brett Moffitt	Hattori Racing Enterprises	Toyota	134	201 (323.478)	1:30:13	133.684	Report	
2019	November 15	16	Austin Hill	Hattori Racing Enterprises	Toyota	134	201 (323.478)	1:31:43	131.492	Report	
2020	June 13*	51	Kyle Busch	Kyle Busch Motorsports	Toyota	134	201 (323.478)	1:54:23	105.435	Report	
2021*	Not held										
2022	October 22	66	Ty Majeski	ThorSport Racing	Toyota	134	201 (323.478)	1:30:35	133.137	Report	
2023	October 21	42	Carson Hocevar	Niece Motorsports	Chevrolet	134	201 (323.478)	1:48:41	110.965	Report	
2024	October 26	9	Grant Enfinger	CR7 Motorsports	Chevrolet	134	201 (323.478)	1:41:13	119.15	Report	
2025	March 21	07	Kyle Larson	Spire Motorsports	Chevrolet	134	201 (323.478)	1:43:01	117.068	Report	
2026	November 6	11	Kaden Honeycutt	Tricon Garage	Toyota	134	201 (323.478)	1:45:07	114.73	Report	
2027	November 12									Report	

Notes

- 2016–2019, 2026: Races were held as the NASCAR Craftsman Truck Series Championship Race.
- 1999, 2007–2009, and 2012–2013: Race was extended due to a NASCAR overtime finish.
- 2011: Race shortened due to rain.
- 2020: Race postponed from March 20 to June 13 due to the COVID-19 pandemic.
- 2021: Race canceled and moved to the Daytona road course due to the COVID-19 pandemic.

=== Multiple winners (drivers) ===
# of wins	Driver	Years won
3	Kyle Busch	2010, 2013, 2020
2	Todd Bodine	2005, 2008

=== Multiple winners (teams) ===
# of wins	Team	Years won
5	Kyle Busch Motorsports	2010, 2013, 2014, 2016, 2020
3	Ultra Motorsports	1999, 2001, 2004
3	ThorSport Racing	2011, 2015, 2022
2	Germain Racing	2005, 2008
2	Hattori Racing Enterprises	2018, 2019

=== Manufacturer wins ===
# of wins	Make	Years won
13	(Japan) Toyota	2005, 2007, 2008, 2010, 2013–2016, 2018–2020, 2022, 2026
8	(United States) Chevrolet	2000, 2002, 2009, 2011, 2012, 2023–2025
6	(United States) Ford	1996–1999, 2006, 2017
3	(United States) Dodge	2001, 2003, 2004

Previous race: Black's Tire 200	NASCAR Truck Series; Craftsman 200	Next race: Fresh From Florida 250
