= Billy Ballew Motorsports =

Former NASCAR team

- Owner: Billy Ballew
- Base: Mooresville, North Carolina
- Series: Camping World Truck Series
- Race drivers: Kurt Busch
- Manufacturer: Chevrolet

Career
- Debut: 1996
- Latest race: 2012
- Drivers' Championships: 0
- Race victories: 19

Billy Ballew Motorsports was a team that competed in the NASCAR Camping World Truck Series. They were formed in 1996 by Georgia businessman Billy Ballew. The team's car numbers are 09, 15, and 51.

== Fasscore Motorsports ==
In 2003, Ballew began running a second truck under the name Fasscore Motorsports with Christopher Beckington as the owner. Rich Bickle finished eighth in its first race, followed by Andy Houston in the next race. After Lance Hooper started their next event, Kenny Hendrick drove for the rest of the season, providing a best finish of 31st. The team disbanded at the end of the season.

== Truck No. 15 history ==
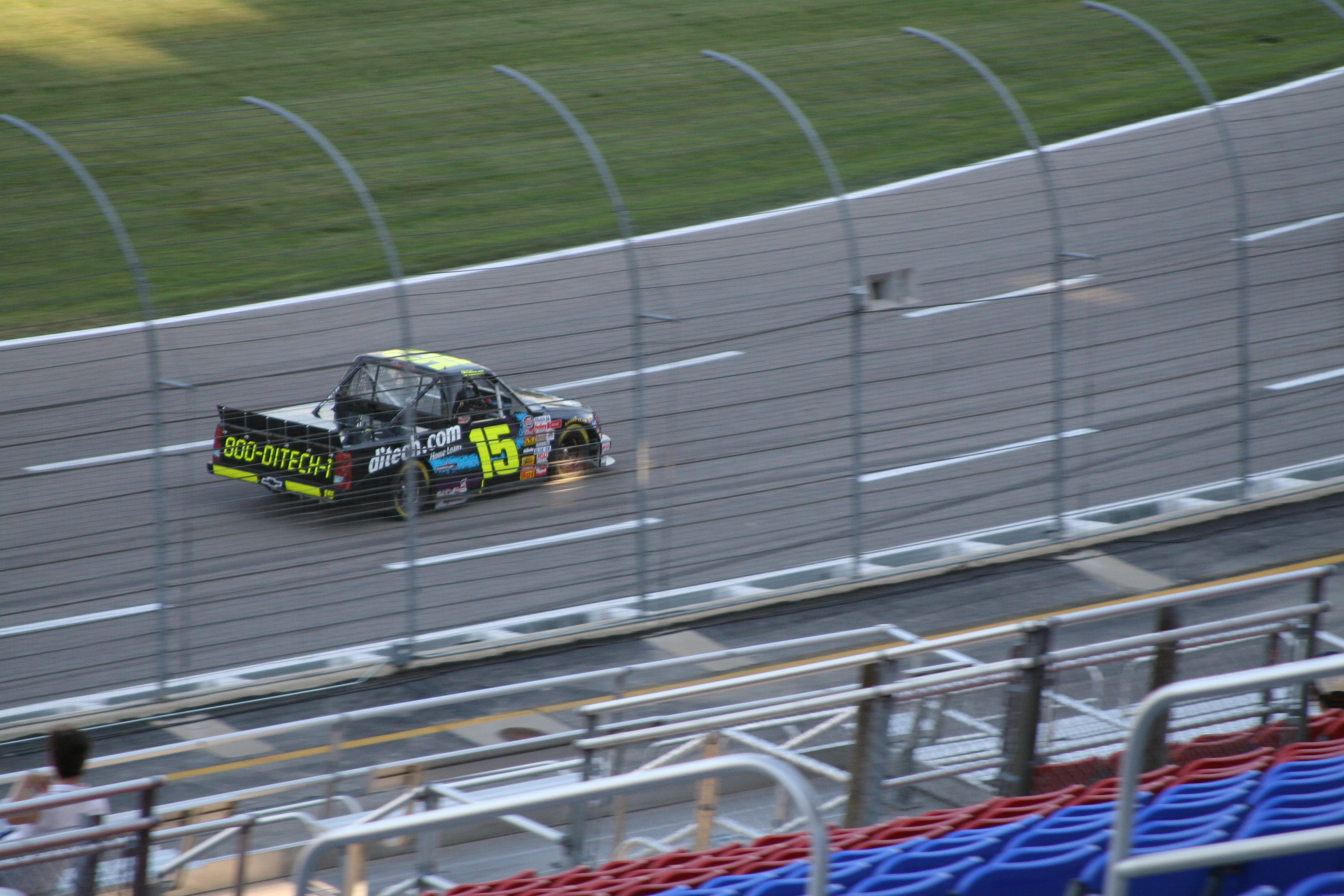
Krisiloff's 2006 truck qualifying at Texas

The 15 truck of Billy Ballew Motorsports has been its original truck since the 1996 season. Originally based in Georgia, the team debuted at Bristol with Mark Gibson driving the Ford F-150 with sponsorship from Isaac Leasco. In their first race, Ballew Motorsports finished 12th and followed it up with a ninth-place run at their next race at The Milwaukee Mile. After running the next five races with L.C. Smith Sales sponsorship, Gibson stepped out of the ride and was replaced by Bobby Gill. Gill brought Nashville Auto Auction sponsorship and had two eleventh-place runs before Rick Johnson finished out the season. His best finish was fifteenth at Phoenix. In 1997, Mike Cope was hired to run a limited schedule with Penrose Meat Snacks sponsorship. They ran six races that year, with the best finish of 12th coming at Louisville.

After nearly a year off, the team returned to Milwaukee in 1998. Scott Hansen qualified the Oshkosh Trucks/Neihus entry eighth but finished twenty-fourth. Bickle would then drive in two races later that season with Turbine Solutions sponsorship, finishing in the top five in both races. The team's first start in 1999 came at Martinsville, where Joe Ruttman finished thirteenth in the Ortho truck. Their next start came late in the season at Las Vegas when Cope returned and finished thirtieth with sponsorship from Manheim Auctions.

The team gained notoriety in 2000 when their truck, sponsored by Line-X and driven by former Daytona 500 winner Geoff Bodine, was involved in a fiery crash in the tri-oval at Daytona. Bodine survived, and for the next three weeks, his son Barry drove the truck and had two top-twenty finishes. Bobby Gill then returned for two races, but he did not finish higher than 32nd. At Chicago Motor Speedway, they briefly switched to the No. 32 to accommodate Anthony Lazzaro, who finished 22nd in the race. For 2001 NASCAR Craftsman Truck Series, the team had originally planned to work with African-American driver Preston Tutt, but the deal fell through. Their first race of the year came at Martinsville, where Jon Wood made his first start in the Mark Warner-sponsored truck and finished 31st. Derek Gilcrist then drove at Darlington and finished seventeenth, followed later by Rick Beebe finishing 30th at Kansas in the Trailside RV entry.

Ballew's No. 15 underwent a name change to Countryman-Ballew Motorsports. The team notably improved its standings from 23rd to 14th and committed to running full-time in 2002. Driver Trent Owens, alongside jeans manufacturer Dickies, secured sponsorship for the truck. However, after Owens attempted seven races, he was replaced by Rich Bickle, who had a promising sixth-place finish in his debut race. Just before the Power Stroke Diesel 200, Dickies signed a sponsorship deal with Bobby Hamilton Racing's No. 18 truck, piloted by driver Robert Pressley, for the remainder of 2002 and all of 2003. This left the team without significant sponsorship. Mark Gibson returned for two races, followed by Brian Rose, before Andy Houston concluded the year.

Houston was signed in 2003 with Vokal Clothing as the sponsor. He achieved a top-five finish at Daytona but was released after five races. Bickle returned, securing a top-ten finish. Mike Skinner then drove for four races as the team transitioned to Dodge for certain events. After separate three-race stints by Ryan Hemphill and Robby Benton, Bickle returned to drive Fords, resulting in two twelfth-place finishes. In 2004, Ballew switched to Chevrolet and hired Shane Hmiel for full-time driving duties, with sponsorship from Small's Harley-Davidson, Whittaker Farms, and later Trim Spa. Hmiel secured Ballew's first Truck Series win at the Las Vegas 350, overtaking Todd Bodine late in the race. Hmiel moved to the Busch Series in 2005, initially replaced by Kerry Earnhardt, who won the pole for the season-opening race in the Kraft Foods truck but was substituted after two races for Hmiel. Kyle Busch then took over the truck with sponsorship from ditech, winning his first two races in the ride. Blake Feese, Martin Truex Jr., Kenny Wallace, Johnny Sauter, and David Gilliland each ran one-race deals for the team, while John Andretti secured two top-tens in four races. Busch concluded the season, adding another win at Atlanta.

In 2006, Ballew signed ARCA RE/MAX Series driver Kyle Krisiloff with sponsorship from ditech. However, conflicts with Kyle's father Steve, a famous USAC driver, led Ballew to release Krisiloff, returning to fielding multiple drivers. The rotation included recently reinstated driver Kevin Grubb, Andretti, Mike Wallace, and Busch. The best finish came for Busch, who finished second at Texas. In 2007, African-American driver Bill Lester was tapped to drive the No. 15 truck. However, ongoing sponsorship difficulties midway through the season led Lester to step out of the truck, handing it over to drivers Denny Hamlin, Andrew Myers, J. R. Norris, and Shane Sieg. Rookie Marc Mitchell was signed to compete for Rookie of the Year in the 15, sponsored by Hyprene Ergon for 21 races in 2008. He drove thirteen before being replaced by a variety of drivers, including Hamlin, David Stremme, Ryan Lawler, Kenny Wallace, John Andretti, James Buescher, and Jason White. In 2009, Sieg, Ickler, Aric Almirola, and Blake Feese shared the No. 15. Ted Musgrave, Steve Wallace, Johnny Benson Jr., Nelson Piquet Jr., and Johanna Long shared the 15 in 2010.

=== Vision Aviation Racing ===
Vision Aviation Racing team logo

In 2011, Ballew merged his organization with the K&N West Series team, Vision Aviation Racing. Their drivers, Dusty Davis and Justin Johnson, competed for Rookie of the Year. However, since neither driver was approved to race at Daytona, two-time Daytona 500 winner Michael Waltrip drove the No. 15 truck at Daytona in the 2011 NextEra Energy Resources 250, sponsored by the Wounded Warrior Project and NASCAR.com RaceView. Waltrip later won the race, marking the 10th anniversary of his first Cup Series win and the 10th anniversary of Dale Earnhardt's death in the 2001 Daytona 500. Shortly after his victory, a broken rear spoiler was discovered on his truck. Despite the infraction, Waltrip retained the emotional victory, while his truck builder was fined $15,000 and placed on probation for the broken piece. The team fielded West Series driver Dusty Davis for only three races before temporarily shutting down. VAR enlisted 2007 Formula One World Champion Kimi Räikkönen for his NASCAR debut at Charlotte before ultimately ceasing operations and laying off many of its employees. The No. 15 was later used by Kyle Busch Motorsports as a secondary entry for other drivers. Engine builder Joey Arrington purchased VAR's remaining equipment and fielded trucks for David Starr and Dusty Davis.

== Truck No. 51 history ==
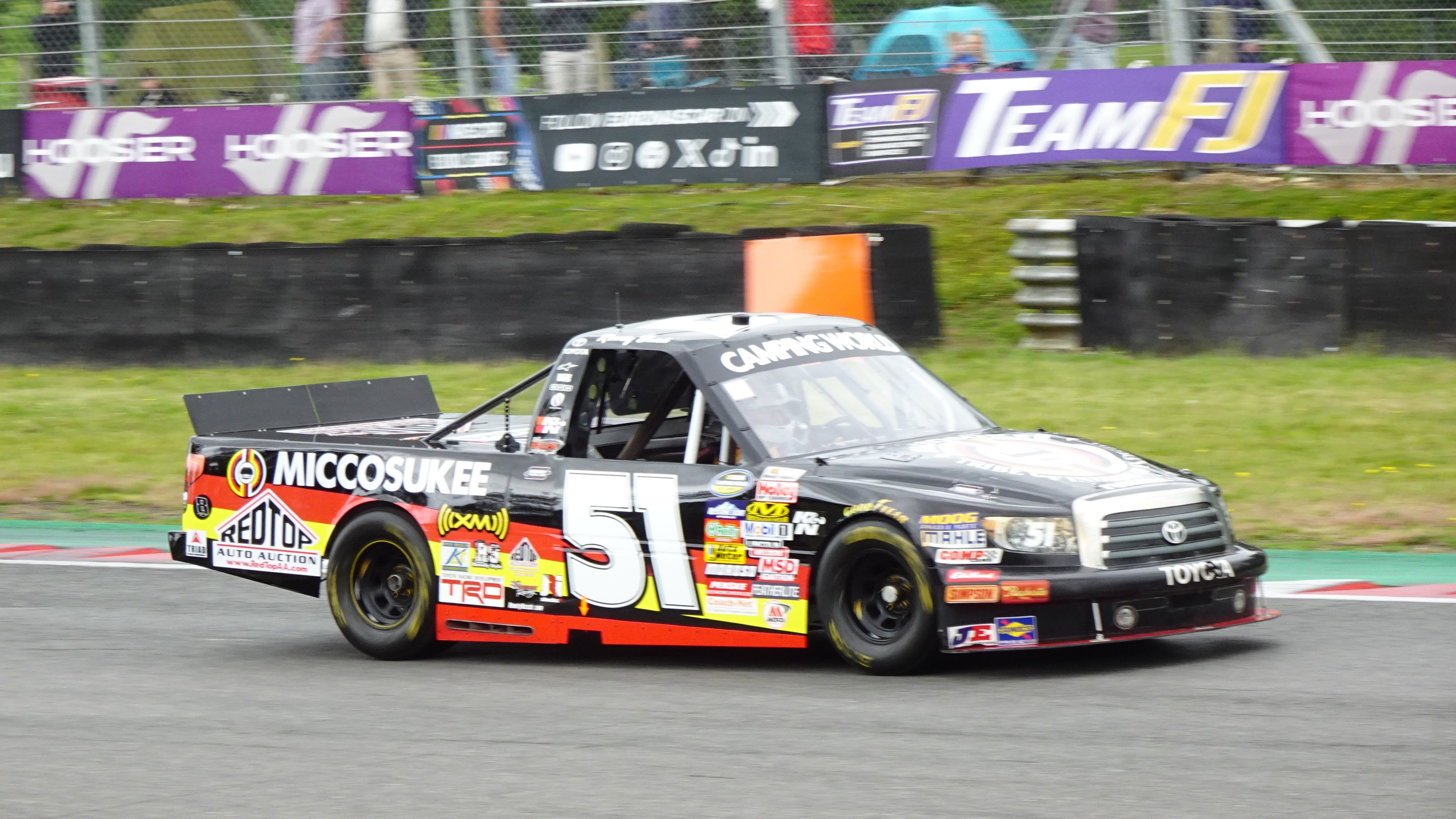
Kyle's Toyota Truck at Brands Hatch in 2026

The No. 51 truck debuted at Lowe's Motor Speedway in 2006 with Kyle Busch behind the wheel. The use of the number and the moniker "Rowdy Busch" above the door paid homage to Rowdy Burns from the film "Days of Thunder." With sponsorship from National Land Liquidations, Busch secured his first win in the truck and finished eighth in the subsequent race at Dover. Johnny Sauter and Martin Truex Jr. each participated in one race in the No. 51 truck. In 2007, Busch competed in the majority of races with the Flanders Beef Patties truck, winning twice. Kenny Wallace, Aric Almirola, and Paul Menard each had one race in the truck, while Kelly Sutton drove in four races with Copaxone sponsorship.

In 2008, Busch and Shane Sieg shared driving duties in the No. 51, racing Toyota Tundras sponsored by NOS Energy Drink, Miccosukee Indian Resort & Gaming, and San Bernardino County. Busch drove the No. 51 part-time in 2009 with NOS Energy Drink and Miccosukee returning as sponsors, while Brian Ickler filled in for races when Busch was unavailable. Following 2009, Busch established his own team, Kyle Busch Motorsports, and enlisted Ickler as a driver. Aric Almirola competed in the full 2010 season with sponsorship from Graceway Pharmaceuticals. Almirola secured two wins and achieved 21 top-tens, finishing 2nd in points behind Todd Bodine. Subsequently, Almirola departed the team to drive JR Motorsports' No. 88 Chevrolet. At Daytona, Almirola raced for VAR, although the No. 51 was initially planned for VAR development driver Justin Johnson. Financial difficulties led Vision Aviation owners to close down the Truck team. Chris Fontaine drove the truck at Dover. The team was later acquired by Ballew once again and fielded a Ford for Colin Braun in two races. In 2011, Kyle Busch Motorsports operated the No. 51 for various drivers, including Josh Richards and German Quiroga for several races.

On August 31, 2012, Billy Ballew Motorsports returned to truck competition by entering the No. 51 Chevy for Sprint Cup Series driver Kurt Busch in the Jeff Foxworthy's Grit Chips 200 at Atlanta. This marked the team's first race of 2012 after closing its doors at the end of the 2011 season. Busch qualified the truck in 19th out of 36 positions and finished 10th. The truck used for this race was chassis number 11, which had a significant history of wins for the team (12 in total). It was fielded with support from Phoenix Racing.
