= NASCAR Craftsman Truck Series at Dover Motor Speedway =

NASCAR Craftsman Truck Series race at Dover Motor Speedway

Ecosave 200

NASCAR Craftsman Truck Series
- Venue: Dover Motor Speedway
- Location: Dover, Delaware, United States
- Corporate sponsor: Ecosave
- First race: 2000
- Last race: 2026
- Distance: 200 miles (320 km)
- Laps: 200 (Stage 1: 45 Stage 2: 45 Stage 3: 110)
- Previous names: MBNA e-commerce.com 200 (2000–2001); MBNA America 200 (2002, 2004); MBNA Armed Forces Family 200 (2003); MBNA RacePoints 200 (2005); AAA Insurance 200 (2006–2009); Dover 200 (2010); Lucas Oil 200 (2011–2015); Jacob Companies 200 (2016); Bar Harbor 200 (2017); JEGS 200 (2018–2019); KDI Office Technology 200(2020)
- Most wins (driver): Kyle Busch (5)
- Most wins (team): Kyle Busch Motorsports; Ultra Motorsports; GMS Racing (3)
- Most wins (manufacturer): Toyota (7)

Circuit information
- Surface: Concrete
- Length: 1 mi (1.6 km)
- Turns: 4

The Ecosave 200 was an annual 200-mile (321.869 km) NASCAR Craftsman Truck Series race held at the Dover Motor Speedway in Dover, Delaware. Kyle Busch was the defending winner of the event, having won it in 2026 only six days before his death.

== History ==
The race was the only race to be shown on tape delay during the past several seasons, but was televised live from 2012 to 2020. The race was a part of the Triple Truck Challenge in 2020. The race was taken of the schedule in 2021. The race made its return in 2026. On August 12, 2026, Dover announced the return of its points race, without a Craftsman Truck Series race.

== Past winners ==
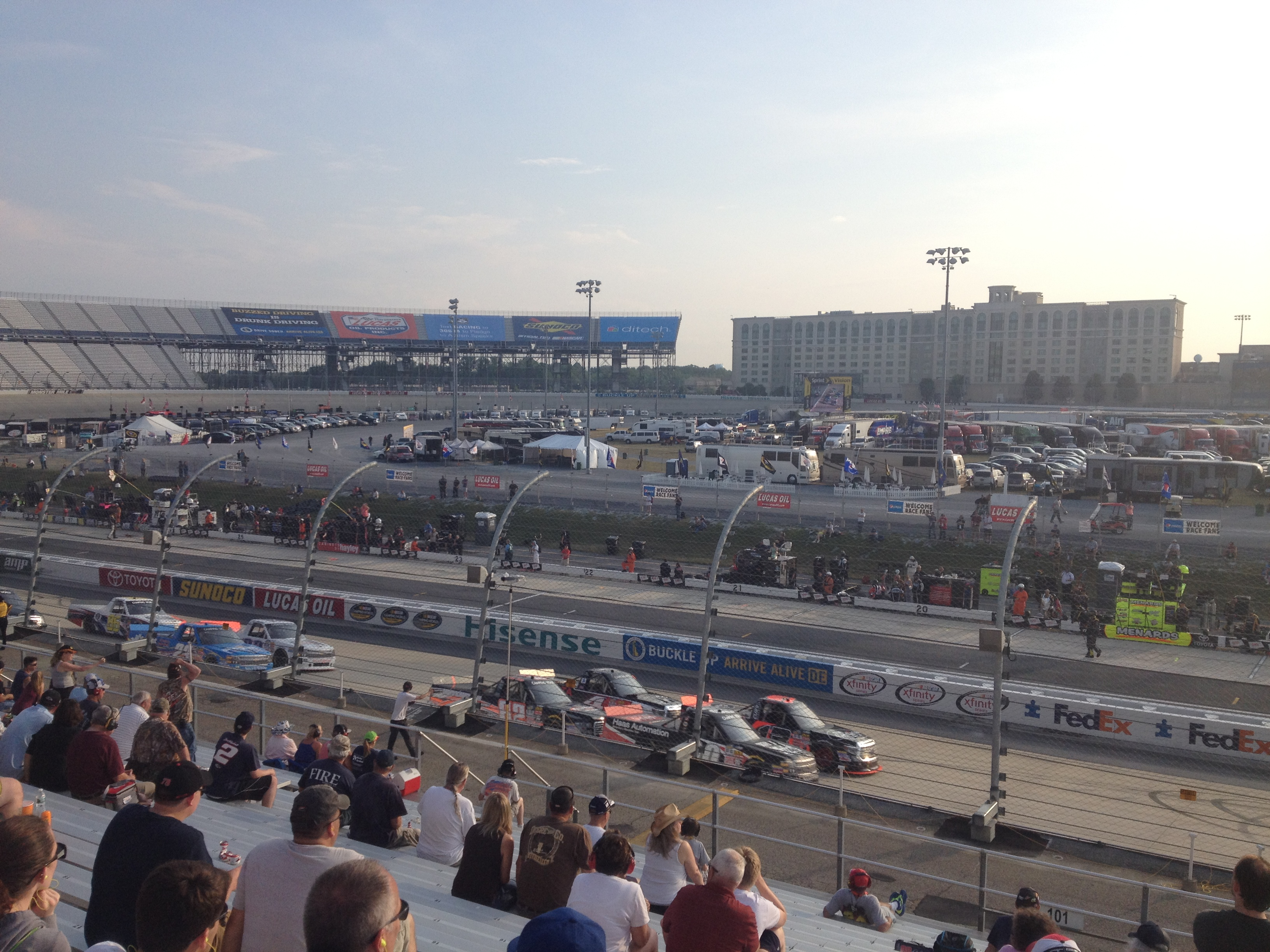
Trucks race on the front stretch during the 2015 race

Year	Date	No.	Driver	Team	Manufacturer	Race Distance		Race Time	Average Speed (mph)	Report	Ref
Year	Date	No.	Driver	Team	Manufacturer	Laps	Miles (km)	Race Time	Average Speed (mph)	Report	Ref
2000	Sept 22	99	Kurt Busch	Roush Racing	Ford	203*	203 (326.696)	2:05:21	97.168	Report	
2001	June 2	2	Scott Riggs	Ultra Motorsports	Dodge	200	200 (321.868)	2:00:54	99.256	Report	
2002	May 31	1	Ted Musgrave	Ultra Motorsports	Dodge	200	200 (321.868)	1:54:47	104.545	Report	
2003	May 30	2	Jason Leffler	Ultra Motorsports	Dodge	200	200 (321.868)	2:03:25	97.232	Report	
2004	June 4	18	Chad Chaffin	Bobby Hamilton Racing	Dodge	200	200 (321.868)	2:01:13	98.996	Report	
2005	June 4	15	Kyle Busch	Billy Ballew Motorsports	Chevrolet	200	200 (321.868)	2:04:03	96.735	Report	
2006	June 2	6	Mark Martin	Roush Racing	Ford	200	200 (321.868)	1:39:50	120.2	Report	
2007	June 1	33	Ron Hornaday Jr.	Kevin Harvick Inc.	Chevrolet	200	200 (321.868)	1:51:40	107.463	Report	
2008	May 30	22	Scott Speed	Bill Davis Racing	Toyota	200	200 (321.868)	1:59:40	100.279	Report	
2009	May 30*	16	Brian Scott	Xpress Motorsports	Toyota	200	200 (321.868)	2:09:17	92.819	Report	
2010	May 14	51	Aric Almirola	Billy Ballew Motorsports	Toyota	204*	204 (328.306)	2:05:03	97.881	Report	
2011	May 13	18	Kyle Busch	Kyle Busch Motorsports	Toyota	200	200 (321.868)	2:00:22	99.695	Report	
2012	June 1	11	Todd Bodine	Red Horse Racing	Toyota	147*	147 (236.573)	1:48:00	81.667	Report	
2013	May 31	51	Kyle Busch	Kyle Busch Motorsports	Toyota	200	200 (321.868)	1:50:05	109.008	Report	
2014	May 30	51	Kyle Busch	Kyle Busch Motorsports	Toyota	200	200 (321.868)	1:57:12	102.389	Report	
2015	May 29	19	Tyler Reddick	Brad Keselowski Racing	Ford	200	200 (321.868)	1:56:31	102.99	Report	
2016	May 13	88	Matt Crafton	ThorSport Racing	Toyota	200	200 (321.868)	1:47:45	111.369	Report	
2017	June 2	21	Johnny Sauter	GMS Racing	Chevrolet	200	200 (321.868)	2:01:03	99.133	Report	
2018	May 4	21	Johnny Sauter	GMS Racing	Chevrolet	210*	210 (337.961)	2:08:04	98.386	Report	
2019	May 3	13	Johnny Sauter	ThorSport Racing	Ford	200	200 (321.868)	1:51:42	107.431	Report	
2020	August 21*	21	Zane Smith	GMS Racing	Chevrolet	200	200 (321.868)	1:48:21	110.752	Report	
2021 – 2025	Not held										
2026	May 15	7	Kyle Busch	Spire Motorsports	Chevrolet	200	200 (321.868)	1:50:59	108.124	Report	

- 2000, 2010 and 2018: The Race was extended due to a NASCAR Overtime finish.
- 2009: Race postponed from Friday to Saturday because of rain showers.
- 2012: Race shortened because of rain showers and darkness.
- 2020: Race postponed from May 1 to August 21 due to the COVID-19 pandemic.

=== Multiple winners (drivers) ===
# Wins	Driver	Years won
5	Kyle Busch	2005, 2011, 2013, 2014, 2026
3	Johnny Sauter	2017, 2018, 2019

=== Multiple winners (teams) ===
# Wins	Team	Years won
3	Ultra Motorsports	2001, 2002, 2003
3	Kyle Busch Motorsports	2011, 2013, 2014
3	GMS Racing	2017, 2018, 2020
2	Roush Racing	2000, 2006
2	Billy Ballew Motorsports	2005, 2010
2	ThorSport Racing	2016, 2019

=== Manufacturer wins ===
# Wins	Make	Years won
7	(Japan) Toyota	2008, 2009, 2010, 2011, 2012, 2013, 2014, 2016
6	(United States) Chevrolet	2005, 2007, 2017, 2018, 2020, 2026
4	(United States) Dodge	2001, 2002, 2003, 2004
4	(United States) Ford	2000, 2006, 2015, 2019

Previous race: Bully Hill Vineyards 176 at The Glen	NASCAR Craftsman Truck Series; Ecosave 200	Next race: North Carolina Education Lottery 200
