= NASCAR Truck Series at Martinsville Speedway =

NASCAR Truck Series races at Martinsville Speedway

NASCAR Truck Series
- Venue: Martinsville Speedway
- Location: Ridgeway, Virginia, United States

Circuit information
- Surface: Asphalt; Concrete (turns)
- Length: 0.526 mi (0.847 km)
- Turns: 4

Stock car racing events in the NASCAR Truck Series have been held at Martinsville Speedway, in Ridgeway, Virginia during numerous seasons and times of year since the series' inception in 1995. The current race is 200 laps and 105.2 miles (169.303 km).

First held in 1995, a race event in the spring and/or fall has been held at the track every year. As part of the 2020 schedule realignment, the fall race became the only Truck Series race at the track as NASCAR decided to give the track one Xfinity Series race instead. In 2022, the fall race was moved to the spring and there was no fall race at the track for the first time since 2002. In 2024, the fall race returned. In 2026, the spring race was removed in favor of the fall event.

== Current race ==
Black's Tire 200
- Corporate sponsor: Title Sponsor: Black's Tire; Presenting Sponsor: Down East Heating & Air Conditioning
- First race: 2003
- Distance: 105.2 miles (169.3 km)
- Laps: 200; Stages 1/2: 50 each Final stage: 100
- Previous names: Advance Auto Parts 200 (2003); Kroger 200 (2004–2015); Texas Roadhouse 200 presented by Alpha Energy Solutions (2016–2018); NASCAR Hall of Fame 200 (2019–2020); United Rentals 200 (2021); Zip Buy Now, Pay Later 200 (2024); Slim Jim 200 (2025)
- Most wins (driver): Denny Hamlin; Bubba Wallace; Johnny Sauter (2)
- Most wins (team): Kyle Busch Motorsports (6)
- Most wins (manufacturer): Toyota (12)

The Black's Tire 200 presented by Down East Heating & Air Conditioning is a NASCAR Truck Series race at Martinsville Speedway in Ridgeway, Virginia. The race is held on the weekend of the NASCAR Cup Series' Xfinity 500.

Chandler Smith is the defending race winner.

=== History ===
The race was added to the NASCAR Truck Series schedule in 2003 and was won by Jon Wood. The race has been held since in most years then. The 2020 race was held at night and became the Truck Series' only annual visit to Martinsville. That year and in 2019, the NASCAR Hall of Fame was the title sponsor. United Rentals became the title sponsor of the fall Truck Series race at Martinsville in 2021, which was the last year the Truck Series held a race in the fall at the track.

The race returned in 2024. Since then, the race has had various title sponsors, such as Zip Buy Now, Pay Later, Slim Jim, and Black's Tire.

==== Records made ====
In the 2013 race, Bubba Wallace became the first African American to win in a Truck Series race in series history and the first African American driver since 1963 to win a race in any of NASCAR's three national series. He won back-to-back races at Martinsville when he drove his Kyle Busch Motorsports truck to the win in the 2014 fall Martinsville race. That year, his truck number was changed from No. 54 to No. 34 for this one race as a tribute to fellow African American driver Wendell Scott being inducted into the NASCAR Hall of Fame a few months later.

=== Past winners ===
Year	Date	No.	Driver	Team	Manufacturer	Race Distance		Race Time	Average Speed (mph)	Report	Ref
Year	Date	No.	Driver	Team	Manufacturer	Laps	Miles (km)	Race Time	Average Speed (mph)	Report	Ref
2003	October 18	50	Jon Wood	Roush Racing	Ford	200	105.2 (169.302)	1:27:35	72.069	Report	
2004	October 23	2	Jamie McMurray	Ultra Motorsports	Dodge	200	105.2 (169.302)	1:43:47	60.819	Report	
2005	October 22	99	Ricky Craven	Roush Racing	Ford	200	105.2 (169.302)	1:38:07	64.332	Report	
2006	October 21	60	Jack Sprague	Wyler Racing	Toyota	200	105.2 (169.302)	1:44:54	60.172	Report	
2007	October 20	5	Mike Skinner	Bill Davis Racing	Toyota	200	105.2 (169.302)	1:45:58	59.566	Report	
2008	October 18	23	Johnny Benson Jr.	Bill Davis Racing	Toyota	200	105.2 (169.302)	1:32:32	68.213	Report	
2009	October 24	1	Timothy Peters	Red Horse Racing	Toyota	200	105.2 (169.302)	1:31:04	69.312	Report	
2010	October 23	33	Ron Hornaday Jr.	Kevin Harvick Inc.	Chevrolet	206*	108.356 (174.382)	1:42:37	63.356	Report	
2011	October 29	18	Denny Hamlin	Kyle Busch Motorsports	Toyota	200	105.2 (169.302)	1:35:49	65.876	Report	
2012	October 27	51	Denny Hamlin	Kyle Busch Motorsports	Toyota	200	105.2 (169.302)	1:30:42	69.579	Report	
2013	October 26	54	Bubba Wallace	Kyle Busch Motorsports	Toyota	200	105.2 (169.302)	1:34:47	66.594	Report	
2014	October 25	34	Bubba Wallace	Kyle Busch Motorsports	Toyota	200	105.2 (169.302)	1:44:20	60.498	Report	
2015	October 31	88	Matt Crafton	ThorSport Racing	Toyota	200	105.2 (169.302)	1:44:08	60.615	Report	
2016	October 29	21	Johnny Sauter	GMS Racing	Chevrolet	200	105.2 (169.302)	1:25:29	73.839	Report	
2017	October 28	18	Noah Gragson	Kyle Busch Motorsports	Toyota	200	105.2 (169.302)	1:32:55	67.932	Report	
2018	October 27	21	Johnny Sauter	GMS Racing	Chevrolet	200	105.2 (169.302)	1:31:05	69.299	Report	
2019	October 26	4	Todd Gilliland	Kyle Busch Motorsports	Toyota	201*	105.726 (170.148)	1:50:02	57.651	Report	
2020	October 30	98	Grant Enfinger	ThorSport Racing	Ford	200	105.2 (169.302)	2:00:27	52.403	Report	
2021	October 29	21	Zane Smith	GMS Racing	Chevrolet	204*	107.304 (172.788)	1:54:09	56.402	Report	
2022 – 2023	Not held										
2024	November 1	19	Christian Eckes	McAnally–Hilgemann Racing	Chevrolet	200	105.2 (169.302)	1:36:12	65.613	Report	
2025	October 24	11	Corey Heim	Tricon Garage	Toyota	203*	106.778 (171.841)	1:49:49	58.340	Report	
2026	October 30	38	Chandler Smith	Front Row Motorsports	Ford	200	105.2 (169.302)	1:48:59	57.901	Report	
2027	November 5									Report	

- 2010, 2019, 2021 and 2025: The race was extended due to a NASCAR overtime finish.

==== Multiple winners (drivers) ====
# Wins	Driver	Years won
2	Denny Hamlin	2011-2012
2	Bubba Wallace	2013-2014
2	Johnny Sauter	2016, 2018

==== Multiple winners (teams) ====
# Wins	Team	Years won
6	Kyle Busch Motorsports	2011-2014, 2017, 2019
3	GMS Racing	2016, 2018, 2021
2	Roush Racing	2003, 2005
2	Bill Davis Racing	2007-2008
2	ThorSport Racing	2015, 2020

==== Manufacturer wins ====
# Wins	Make	Years won
12	(Japan) Toyota	2006-2009, 2011-2015, 2017, 2019, 2025
5	(United States) Chevrolet	2010, 2016, 2018, 2021, 2024
4	(United States) Ford	2003, 2005, 2020, 2026
1	(United States) Dodge	2004

== Former race ==
Boys & Girls Club of the Blue Ridge 200
- Corporate sponsor: Boys & Girls Club of the Blue Ridge
- First race: 1995
- Last race: 2025
- Distance: 105.2 miles (169.3 km)
- Laps: 200; Stages 1/2: 50 each Final stage: 100
- Previous names: Goody's 150 (1995); Hanes 250 (1996–1997); NAPA 250 (1998–2000); Advance Auto Parts 250 (2001–2003); Kroger 250 (2004–2015); Alpha Energy Solutions 250 (2016–2018); TrüNorth Global 250 (2019); Blue-Emu Maximum Pain Relief 200 (2022); Long John Silver's 200 (2023-2024)
- Most wins (driver): Kevin Harvick; Dennis Setzer (3)
- Most wins (team): Morgan-Dollar Motorsports; Richard Childress Racing; ThorSport Racing (3)
- Most wins (manufacturer): Chevrolet (15)

The Boys & Girls Club of the Blue Ridge 200 was a NASCAR Truck Series race at Martinsville Speedway in Ridgeway, Virginia. The race was held on the weekend of the NASCAR Cup Series' Cook Out 400.

Daniel Hemric was the final race winner.

=== History ===
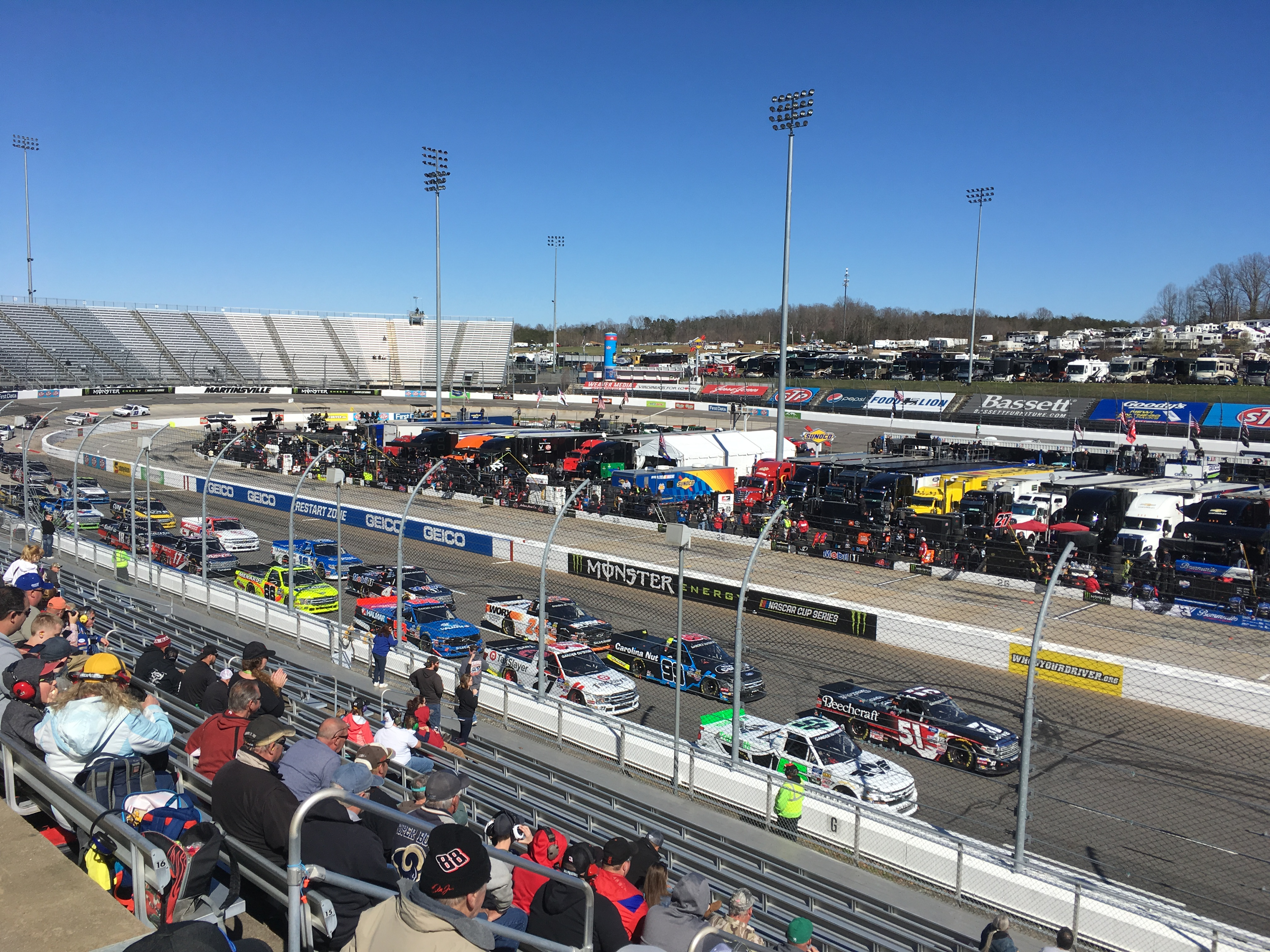
The 2019 Truck Series spring race at Martinsville

In 1995, Joe Ruttman won the inaugural Truck Series race at Martinsville. The race was held every year until 2020, as part of schedule realignment. The fall race became the only Truck Series race at the track as NASCAR decided to give the track one Xfinity Series race instead. This schedule change was done in a swap with Richmond Raceway, which previously had two Xfinity Series races and zero Truck Series races and would now have one Xfinity Series race and one Truck Series race (which replaced the spring race at Martinsville).

The race was sponsored by Alpha Energy Solutions, TrüNorth Global, Blue-Emu Maximum Pain Relief, Long John Silver's, and the Boys & Girls Club of the Blue Ridge. The spring race was dropped in 2026.

=== Past winners ===
Year	Date	No.	Driver	Team	Manufacturer	Race distance		Race time	Average speed (mph)	Report	Ref
Year	Date	No.	Driver	Team	Manufacturer	Laps	Miles (km)	Race time	Average speed (mph)	Report	Ref
1995	September 25	84	Joe Ruttman	Irvan-Simo Racing	Ford	150	78.9 (126.977)	1:12:18	65.072	Report	
1996	September 21	3	Mike Skinner	Richard Childress Racing	Chevrolet	255*	134.13 (215.861)	2:04:55	64.434	Report	
1997	September 27	17	Rich Bickle	Darrell Waltrip Motorsports	Chevrolet	256*	134.656 (216.707)	1:47:18	75.296	Report	
1998	September 26	3	Jay Sauter	Richard Childress Racing	Chevrolet	250	131.5 (211.628)	1:49:21	72.154	Report	
1999	April 17	43	Jimmy Hensley	Petty Enterprises	Dodge	250	131.5 (211.628)	1:46:13	74.282	Report	
2000	April 10	4	Bobby Hamilton	Bobby Hamilton Racing	Dodge	250	131.5 (211.628)	1:49:50	71.836	Report	
2001	April 7	2	Scott Riggs	Ultra Motorsports	Dodge	250	131.5 (211.628)	1:51:23	70.836	Report	
2002	April 13	46	Dennis Setzer	Morgan-Dollar Motorsports	Chevrolet	250	131.5 (211.628)	2:02:05	64.628	Report	
2003	April 12	46	Dennis Setzer	Morgan-Dollar Motorsports	Chevrolet	250	131.5 (211.628)	1:57:54	66.921	Report	
2004	April 17	14	Rick Crawford	Circle Bar Racing	Ford	254*	133.604 (215.014)	2:10:22	61.49	Report	
2005	April 9	47	Bobby Labonte	Morgan-Dollar Motorsports	Chevrolet	250	131.5 (211.628)	1:58:24	66.639	Report	
2006	April 1	11	David Starr	Red Horse Racing	Toyota	250	131.5 (211.628)	2:13:14	59.219	Report	
2007	March 31	5	Mike Skinner	Bill Davis Racing	Toyota	253*	133.078 (214.168)	2:09:18	61.753	Report	
2008	March 29	18	Dennis Setzer	Bobby Hamilton Racing	Dodge	253*	133.078 (214.168)	2:10:14	61.311	Report	
2009	March 30*	2	Kevin Harvick	Kevin Harvick Inc.	Chevrolet	251*	132.026 (212.475)	2:10:09	60.865	Report	
2010	March 27	2	Kevin Harvick	Kevin Harvick Inc.	Chevrolet	250	131.5 (211.628)	2:05:39	62.793	Report	
2011	April 2	13	Johnny Sauter	ThorSport Racing	Chevrolet	250	131.5 (211.628)	2:01:50	64.761	Report	
2012	March 31	2	Kevin Harvick	Richard Childress Racing	Chevrolet	250	131.5 (211.628)	1:51:31	70.752	Report	
2013	April 6	98	Johnny Sauter	ThorSport Racing	Toyota	250	131.5 (211.628)	2:06:03	62.595	Report	
2014	March 30*	88	Matt Crafton	ThorSport Racing	Toyota	256*	134.656 (216.707)	1:57:32	68.741	Report	
2015	March 28	29	Joey Logano	Brad Keselowski Racing	Ford	258*	135.708 (218.4)	1:59:22	68.214	Report	
2016	April 2	18	Kyle Busch	Kyle Busch Motorsports	Toyota	255*	134.13 (215.861)	2:10:12	61.811	Report	
2017	April 1	23	Chase Elliott	GMS Racing	Chevrolet	250	131.5 (211.628)	2:01:38	64.867	Report	
2018	March 24/26*	8	John Hunter Nemechek	NEMCO Motorsports	Chevrolet	250	131.5 (211.628)	2:02:05	64.628	Report	
2019	March 23	51	Kyle Busch	Kyle Busch Motorsports	Toyota	250	131.5 (211.628)	1:52:26	70.175	Report	
2020 – 2021	Not held										
2022	April 7	7	William Byron	Spire Motorsports	Chevrolet	200	105.2 (169.303)	1:47:36	58.662	Report	
2023	April 14	11	Corey Heim	Tricon Garage	Toyota	124*	65.224 (104.967)	1:23:32	46.849	Report	
2024	April 5	19	Christian Eckes	McAnally–Hilgemann Racing	Chevrolet	200	105.2 (169.303)	1:52:54	55.908	Report	
2025	March 28	19	Daniel Hemric	McAnally–Hilgemann Racing	Chevrolet	200	105.2 (169.303)	1:50:02	57.364	Report	

- 1996, 1997, 2004, 2007–2009 and 2014–2016: Race extended due to a NASCAR Overtime finish.
- 2009: Race postponed from Saturday to Monday due to rain.
- 2014: Race postponed from Saturday to Sunday due to rain.
- 2018: Race red-flagged after 23 laps due to snow and rain, forcing the remainder to be postponed from Saturday to Monday.
- 2023: Race shortened due to rain.

==== Multiple winners (drivers) ====
# Wins	Driver	Years won
3	Dennis Setzer	2002, 2003, 2008
3	Kevin Harvick	2009, 2010, 2012
2	Mike Skinner	1996, 2007
2	Johnny Sauter	2011, 2013
2	Kyle Busch	2016, 2019

==== Multiple winners (teams) ====
# Wins	Team	Years won
3	Richard Childress Racing	1996, 1998, 2012
3	Morgan-Dollar Motorsports	2002, 2003, 2005
3	ThorSport Racing	2011, 2013, 2014
2	Bobby Hamilton Racing	2000, 2008
2	Kevin Harvick Inc.	2009, 2010
2	Kyle Busch Motorsports	2016, 2019
2	McAnally–Hilgemann Racing	2024, 2025

==== Manufacturer wins ====
# Wins	Make	Years won
15	(United States) Chevrolet	1996-1998, 2002-2003, 2005, 2009-2012, 2017-2018, 2022, 2024-2025
7	(Japan) Toyota	2006-2007, 2013-2014, 2016, 2019, 2023
4	(United States) Dodge	1999-2001, 2008
3	(United States) Ford	1995, 2004, 2015

Previous race: Love's RV Stop 225	NASCAR Truck Series; Black's Tire 200	Next race: Craftsman 200
