= NASCAR Truck Series at Atlanta Motor Speedway =

NASCAR Craftsman Truck Series race at Atlanta Motor Speedway

NASCAR Truck Series
- Venue: Atlanta Motor Speedway
- Location: Hampton, Georgia, United States

Circuit information
- Surface: Asphalt
- Length: 1.54 mi (2.48 km)
- Turns: 4

Stock car racing events in the NASCAR Truck Series have been held at Atlanta Motor Speedway in Hampton, Georgia, during numerous seasons and times of year since 2004.

== Spring race ==
Fr8 208
- Corporate sponsor: Fr8Auctions
- First race: 2004
- Distance: 207.9 miles (334.6 km)
- Laps: 135 (Stage 1–2 30: laps; Stage 3: 75 laps)
- Previous names: Easy Care Vehicle Service Contracts 200 (2004); World Financial Group 200 (2005); John Deere 200 (2006); American Commercial Lines 200 (2007–2009); E-Z-GO 200 (2010); Good Sam Club 200 (2011); Jeff Foxworthy's Grit Chips 200 (2012); Hyundai Construction Equipment 200 (2015); Great Clips 200 (2016); Active Pest Control 200 (2017–2018); Ultimate Tailgating 200 (2019); Vet Tix/Camping World 200 (2020); Fr8Auctions 200 (2021)
- Most wins (driver): Kyle Busch (7)
- Most wins (team): Kyle Busch Motorsports (4)
- Most wins (manufacturer): Toyota (10)

The Fr8 208 is a NASCAR Truck Series race held at Atlanta Motor Speedway. It was initially held from 2004 until 2012 and taken off the schedule in 2013. The race returned to the schedule in 2015 and since then has been held on the Saturday of the race weekend as a doubleheader with the track's NASCAR O'Reilly Auto Parts Series race, the Bennett Transportation & Logistics 250, prior to the NASCAR Cup Series' Autotrader 400 race at the track on Sunday.

=== History ===
In 2016, Great Clips became the title sponsor of the race. In 2020, series title sponsor Camping World sponsored the race along with the Veteran Tickets Foundation (Vet Tix), which is an organization that gives out tickets to sporting events to members of the U.S. Armed Forces. Fr8 (pronounced "freight") Auctions became the title sponsor of the race in 2021. Stages 1 and 2 were both 30 laps long and the final stage was 70 laps long. They returned as the title sponsor in 2022 when the race was lengthened by 8 miles. Therefore, the name of the race became the Fr8 Auctions 208.

=== Past winners ===
Year	Date	No.	Driver	Team	Manufacturer	Race Distance		Race Time	Average Speed (mph)	Report	Ref
Year	Date	No.	Driver	Team	Manufacturer	Laps	Miles (km)	Race Time	Average Speed (mph)	Report	Ref
2004	March 13	4	Bobby Hamilton	Bobby Hamilton Racing	Dodge	133*	204.82 (329.625)	1:39:22	123.675	Report	
2005	March 18	6	Ron Hornaday Jr.	Kevin Harvick Inc.	Chevrolet	135*	207.9 (334.582)	1:27:35	142.424	Report	
2006	March 17	30	Todd Bodine	Germain Racing	Toyota	135*	207.9 (334.582)	1:33:31	133.388	Report	
2007	March 16	5	Mike Skinner	Bill Davis Racing	Toyota	130	200.2 (322.19)	1:53:36	105.739	Report	
2008	March 7	51	Kyle Busch	Billy Ballew Motorsports	Toyota	130	200.2 (322.19)	1:34:10	127.561	Report	
2009	March 7	51	Kyle Busch	Billy Ballew Motorsports	Toyota	130	200.2 (322.19)	1:32:16	130.188	Report	
2010	March 6	2	Kevin Harvick	Kevin Harvick Inc.	Chevrolet	130	200.2 (322.19)	1:39:20	120.926	Report	
2011	September 2	33	Ron Hornaday Jr.	Kevin Harvick Inc.	Chevrolet	130	200.2 (322.19)	1:38:05	122.467	Report	
2012	August 31	3	Ty Dillon	Richard Childress Racing	Chevrolet	130	200.2 (322.19)	1:27:51	136.733	Report	
2013 – 2014	Not held										
2015	February 28	88	Matt Crafton	ThorSport Racing	Toyota	130	200.2 (322.19)	1:25:22	140.711	Report	
2016	February 27	8	John Hunter Nemechek	NEMCO Motorsports	Chevrolet	130	200.2 (322.19)	1:39:09	121.15	Report	
2017	March 4	4	Christopher Bell	Kyle Busch Motorsports	Toyota	130	200.2 (322.19)	1:50:44	108.477	Report	
2018	February 24	16	Brett Moffitt	Hattori Racing Enterprises	Toyota	134*	206.36 (332.104)	1:40:00	123.816	Report	
2019	February 23	51	Kyle Busch	Kyle Busch Motorsports	Toyota	130	200.2 (322.19)	1:46:38	112.648	Report	
2020	June 6*	98	Grant Enfinger	ThorSport Racing	Ford	136*	209.44 (337.06)	1:47:05	117.352	Report	
2021	March 20	51	Kyle Busch	Kyle Busch Motorsports	Toyota	130	200.2 (322.19)	1:29:43	133.888	Report	
2022	March 19	51	Corey Heim	Kyle Busch Motorsports	Toyota	135	207.9 (334.582)	1:54:15	109.182	Report	
2023	March 18	19	Christian Eckes	McAnally–Hilgemann Racing	Chevrolet	137*	210.98 (220.479)	2:17:05	92.344	Report	
2024	February 24	7	Kyle Busch	Spire Motorsports	Chevrolet	135	207.9 (334.582)	1:51:57	111.425	Report	
2025	February 22	7	Kyle Busch	Spire Motorsports	Chevrolet	135	207.9 (334.582)	1:46:52	116.725	Report	
2026	February 21	7	Kyle Busch	Spire Motorsports	Chevrolet	125*	192.5 (309.799)	1:28:09	131.027	Report	
2027	February 27									Report	

Notes

- 2004–2006, 2018, 2020 and 2023: Race extended due to NASCAR overtime.
- 2020: Race postponed from March 14 to June 6 due to the COVID-19 pandemic.
- 2026: Race shortened due to adverse conditions rule.

==== Multiple winners (drivers) ====
# Wins	Driver	Years won
7	Kyle Busch	2008, 2009, 2019, 2021, 2024–2026
2	Ron Hornaday Jr.	2005, 2011

==== Multiple winners (teams) ====
# Wins	Team	Years won
4	Kyle Busch Motorsports	2017, 2019, 2021, 2022
3	Kevin Harvick Inc.	2005, 2010, 2011
3	Spire Motorsports	2024–2026
2	Billy Ballew Motorsports	2008, 2009
2	ThorSport Racing	2015, 2020

==== Manufacturer wins ====
# Wins	Make	Years won
10	(Japan) Toyota	2006-2009, 2015, 2017-2019, 2021, 2022
9	(United States) Chevrolet	2005, 2010-2012, 2016, 2023-2026
1	(United States) Dodge	2004
1	(United States) Ford	2020

== Summer race ==
TBA
- First race: 2005
- Distance: 249.48 miles (401.50 km)
- Laps: 162; Stage 1/2: 45 each Final stage: 73
- Previous names: EasyCare Vehicle Service Contracts 200 (2005–2007); E-Z-Go 200 (2008)
- Most wins (driver): Kyle Busch (2)
- Most wins (team): Billy Ballew Motorsports (2)
- Most wins (manufacturer): Chevrolet (4)

The Truck Series summer race at Atlanta Motor Speedway is a NASCAR Truck Series race held at Atlanta Motor Speedway. It was initially held from 2005 due to the Ferko lawsuit until 2008 and taken off the schedule in 2009 for a truck race at Chicagoland. The race will return to the schedule in 2027 replacing the NASCAR O'Reilly Auto Parts Series second date at AMS.

=== Past winners ===
Year	Date	No.	Driver	Team	Manufacturer	Race Distance		Race Time	Average Speed (mph)	Report	Ref
Year	Date	No.	Driver	Team	Manufacturer	Laps	Miles (km)	Race Time	Average Speed (mph)	Report	Ref
2005	October 29	15	Kyle Busch	Billy Ballew Motorsports	Chevrolet	130	200.2 (322.19)	1:30:19	132.999	Report	
2006	October 28	16	Mike Bliss	Xpress Motorsports	Chevrolet	130	200.2 (322.19)	1:37:30	123.2	Report	
2007	October 27	51	Kyle Busch	Billy Ballew Motorsports	Chevrolet	130	200.2 (322.19)	1:34:18	127.381	Report	
2008	October 25	2	Ryan Newman	Kevin Harvick Inc.	Chevrolet	130	200.2 (322.19)	1:27:24	137.437	Report	
2009 – 2026	Not held										
2027	July 17									Report	

==== Multiple winners (drivers) ====
# Wins	Driver	Years won
2	Kyle Busch	2005, 2007

==== Multiple winners (teams) ====
# Wins	Team	Years won
2	Billy Ballew Motorsports	2005, 2007

==== Manufacturer wins ====
# Wins	Make	Years won
4	(United States) Chevrolet	2005–2008

Previous race: Fresh From Florida 250	NASCAR Truck Series; Fr8 208	Next race: OnlyBulls Green Flag 150

Previous race: LiUNA! 150	NASCAR Truck Series; TBA	Next race: TSport 200
